= 2025 Liberal Democratic Party presidential election =

Political leadership election in Japan

- 4 October 2025
- Registered: 916,400 (▼13.21%)
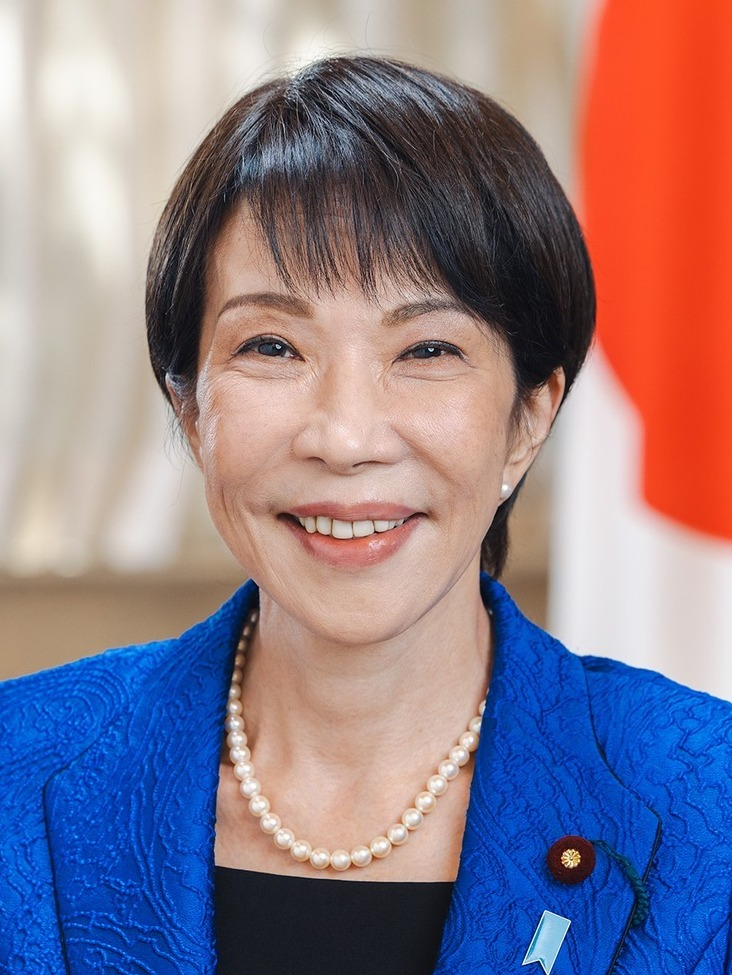

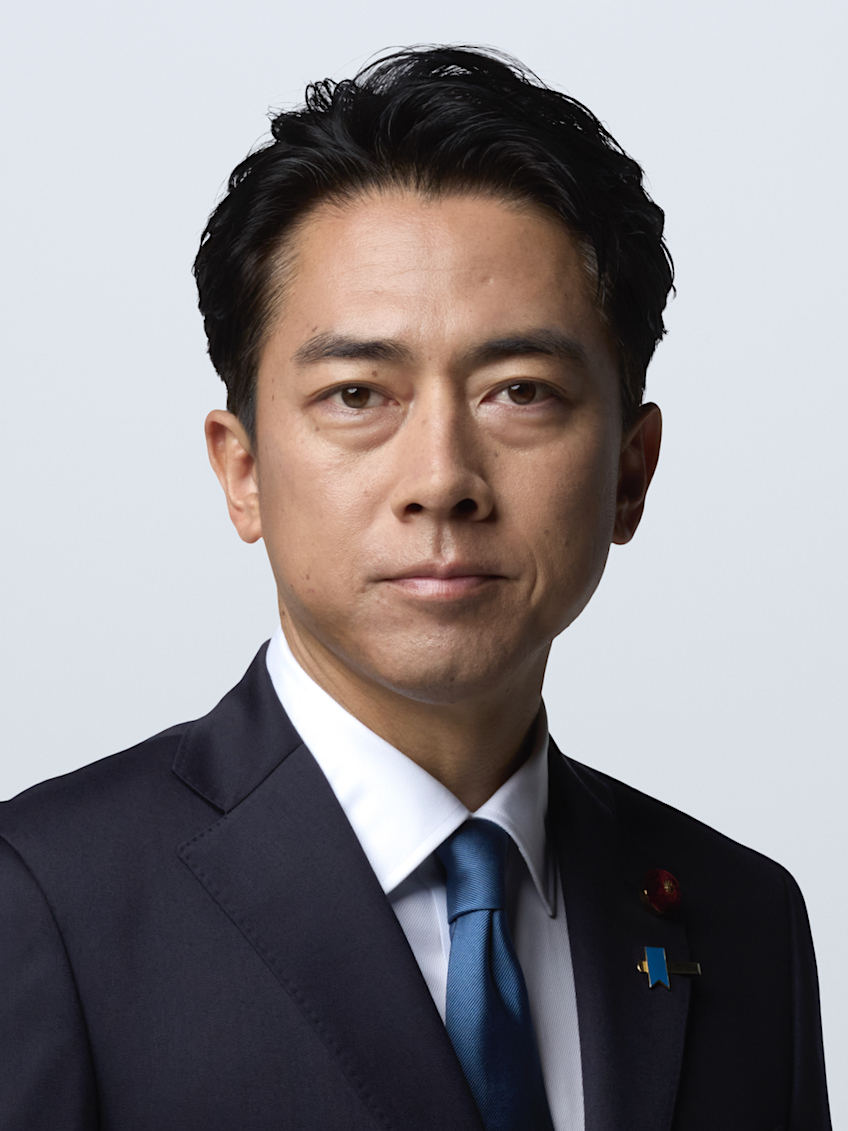

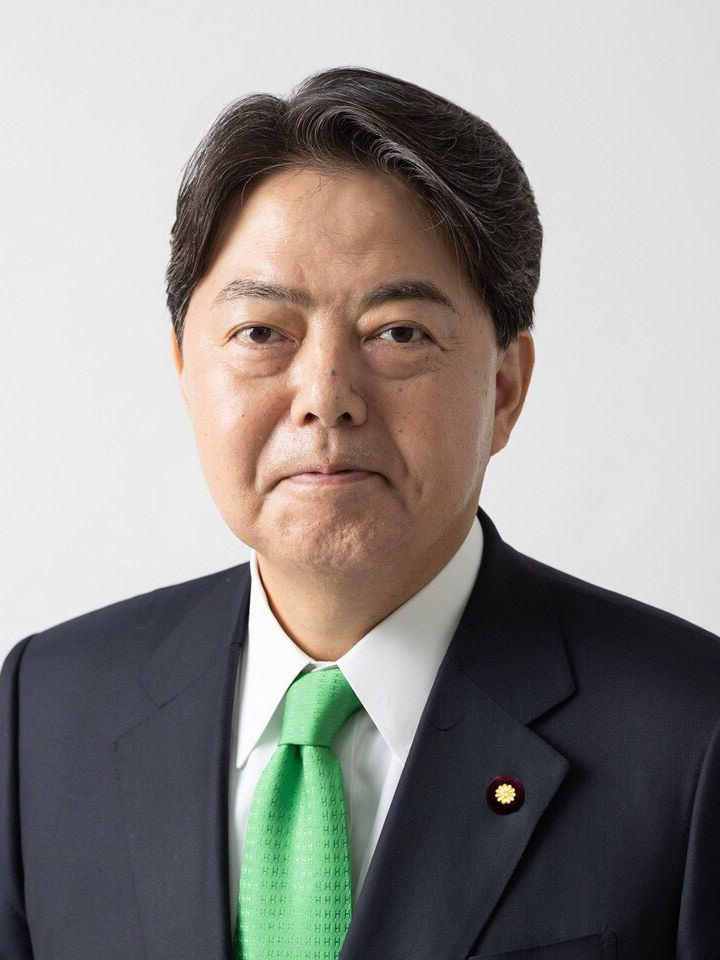
Candidate	Sanae Takaichi	Shinjirō Koizumi	Yoshimasa Hayashi
Leader's seat	Nara 2nd	Kanagawa 11th	Yamaguchi 3rd
First round	183 (31.07%)	164 (27.84%)	134 (22.75%)
Runoff vote	185 (54.25%)	156 (45.75%)	Eliminated
President before election
Shigeru Ishiba
Elected President
Sanae Takaichi

The 2025 Liberal Democratic Party presidential election was held on 4 October 2025 to elect the next president of the Liberal Democratic Party of Japan (LDP). The election was triggered by the resignation of Prime Minister of Japan and LDP president Shigeru Ishiba, which was announced on 7 September 2025, amid infighting within the LDP and pressure for a snap election. Ishiba's resignation also came amid the LDP's poor performance in the 2024 Japanese general election and the 2025 Japanese House of Councillors election, which resulted in the party losing its majority in both chambers.

In this election, all five candidates that ran for the LDP leadership previously ran unsuccessful campaigns in the past. Running in the election were: former Minister of State for Economic Security Sanae Takaichi, Agricultural Minister Shinjirō Koizumi, Chief Cabinet Secretary Yoshimasa Hayashi, former Economic Minister Takayuki Kobayashi and former foreign minister Toshimitsu Motegi. In the first round of voting, Takaichi came in first place during the first round of voting with 31.07% of the vote. Koizumi came in second with 27.84% of the vote, meaning that both Koizumi and Takaichi advanced to the runoff. In the runoff, Takaichi garnered 54.25% of the vote against Koizumi, resulting in the election of the LDP's first woman president.

Takaichi would become the first woman to serve as prime minister during the National Diet's extraordinary session. On 10 October, five days before the prime minister confirmation vote, Komeito withdrew its participation from the LDP-led coalition and vowed to vote against Takaichi as prime minister. Following this, the vote to confirm Takaichi was delayed until 20 October, and was afterwards again delayed to 21 October. It also resulted in the LDP's national ruling coalition collapsing and the creation of a new political crisis. On 19 October, after negotiations led by Takaichi, the Japan Innovation Party agreed to form a coalition with the LDP. A coalition partnership agreement was signed on 20 October and she became the country's first female prime minister on 21 October. Takaichi subsequently appointed all of her former rivals to her cabinet or to senior positions within the party.

== Election procedure ==
The election process for the president of the LDP is established in the "Rules for the Election of President of the Party". In order to officially qualify as a candidate in the election, a candidate must be an LDP member of the National Diet and must receive a nomination from at least 20 fellow LDP Diet members. The LDP selects its leader via a two-round election involving both LDP members of the Diet and dues-paying party members from across Japan. In the first round, all 295 LDP members of the Diet will cast one vote while party member votes (915,574) are translated proportionally into votes equaling the other half of the total ballots (also 295) to equal 590 total first round votes. If any candidate wins a majority (over 50%, ~296 votes) of votes in the first round, that candidate is elected president. If no candidate reaches that threshold, then an instant runoff is triggered; in this second round, the two candidates who receives the highest vote share advance, and the winner is decided by the 295 Diet members, and the party's 47 prefectural chapters, with each chapter being allotted one vote each, equally a total 342. The winner of the second round becomes the next party president.

915,574 citizens are eligible to vote, with their votes proportionally weighted. According to NHK News, there are two ways to conduct a presidential election, depending on whether or not it includes a party member vote. Party rules stipulate that the election will be contested through a combination of votes from Diet members and "party member votes" from party members across Japan; this was how the 2024 Liberal Democratic Party presidential election was conducted, with over 1.05 million party members voting nationwide. During "particularly urgent cases", such as the president's resignation during his term, Diet members and 3 representatives from each of the 47 prefectural party chapters will vote at a general meeting of both houses of parliament, which replaces the party convention; the last time this occurred was in the 2020 Liberal Democratic Party presidential election, when Yoshihide Suga replaced Shinzo Abe as party president. TBS News reported on 8 September that the presidential election would likely be conducted in the former format, allowing local party members to vote. This was confirmed the following day.

=== Organization ===
As with the last leadership election, the LDP Presidential Election Commission was chaired by Ichiro Aisawa. The party's public relations headquarters published the official slogan of the election on 19 September: "#ChangeTheLDP".

LDP Presidential Election Management Committee
Position	Portrait	Member of the Diet
Chairman		Ichiro Aisawa
Deputy Chair		Ichiro Miyashita
Members		Hideki Niwa
Members		Makoto Oniki
Members		Ayuko Kato
Members		Hiroo Kodera
Members		Ayano Kunimitsu
Members		Junji Hasegawa
Members		Yuhei Yamashita
Members		Takashi Koyari
Members		Genchi Furusho

== Background ==
=== Premiership of Shigeru Ishiba and impact of election losses ===
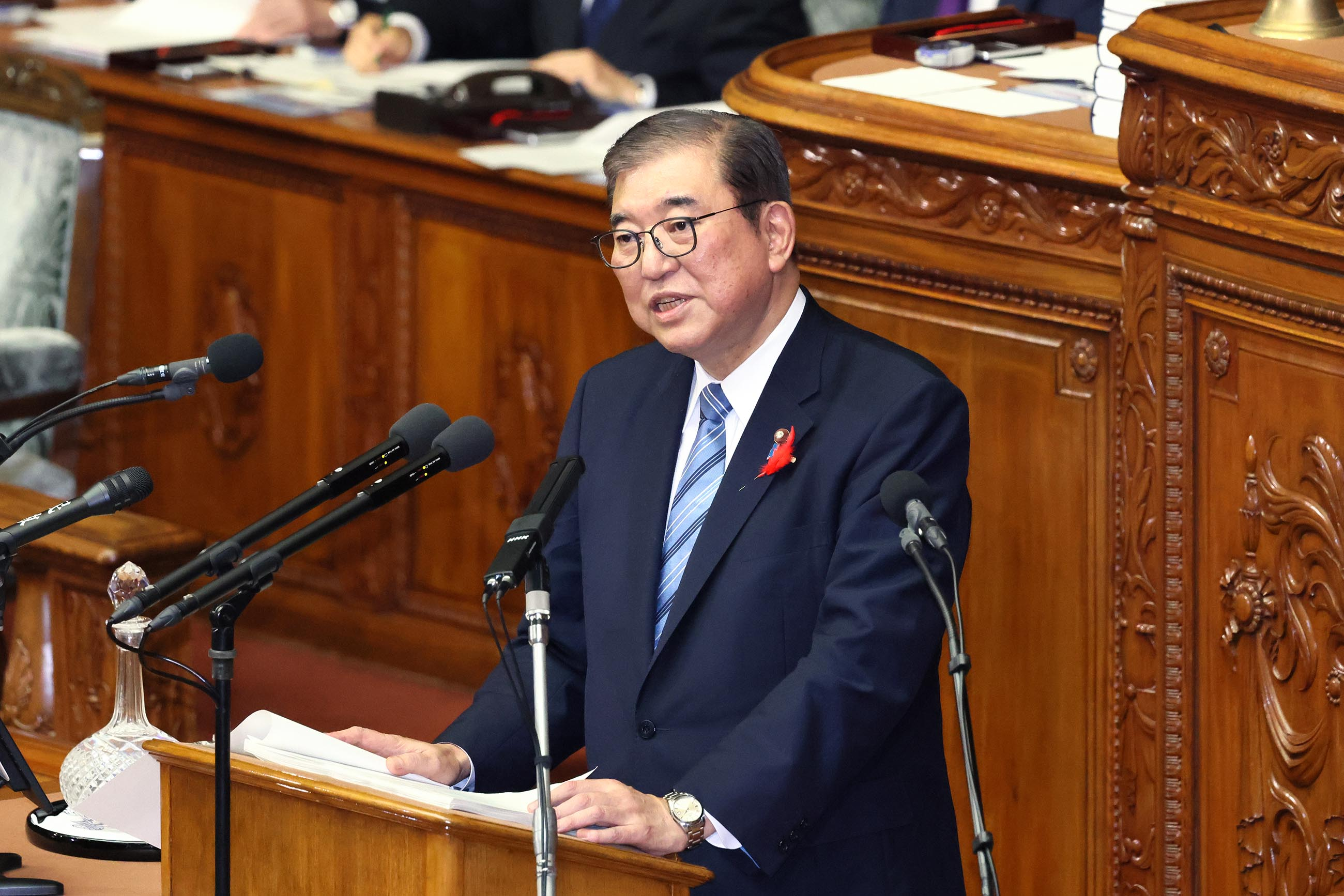
Shigeru Ishiba was elected party president and prime minister in 2024; he led the party through two subsequent elections, in which the LDP lost its majority in both the House of Representatives and House of Councilors, respectively.

Shigeru Ishiba won the 2024 LDP leadership election in September 2024, defeating Sanae Takaichi. The win was considered an upset, as Ishiba, generally considered a centrist, defeated Takaichi, a conservative nationalist, in a second round runoff. Ishiba became Prime Minister in October, and immediately called a general election. In the snap election, the LDP, and its coalition partner the Komeito, lost its majority for the first time since 2009, while opposition parties such as the Constitutional Democratic Party (CDP) and Democratic Party for the People (DPFP) made gains. Two members of Ishiba's cabinet lost their seats, as the government was reduced to a minority status. As no party controlled the House of Representatives, Ishiba was reelected prime minister in the Diet in a runoff vote, after opposition parties failed to coalesce around a single candidate. Ishiba reshuffled his cabinet.

Elections for Japan's Upper House, the House of Councilors, were due in July 2025. Once again, the LDP–Komeito coalition lost its majority, as parties like the CDP and DPFP, as well as the far-right nationalist Sanseitō party, made gains. After both elections, Ishiba invoked a parliamentary plurality in both houses, and believed the LDP had a responsibility to lead the government, as it would in most other parliamentary democracies. Pressure continued to mount on Ishiba to resign as LDP president, but he refused and said he planned to continue serving as prime minister. It was falsely reported on 23 July 2025 that Ishiba would resign in late August, before Ishiba himself debunked the rumors at LDP headquarters that same day. Mid-career and junior members of the LDP, primarily members and former members of the Motegi faction, began collecting signatures to call for the early convening of a joint meeting of the party representing both houses of parliament.

The consecutive election losses impacted the composition of party factions, most of which had officially disbanded after 2024, but still played a crucial role in the LDP's internal politics. 'The Nikkei reported shortly after the Upper House elections that the strength of the Abe faction (a more conservative party faction once led by the late former prime minister Shinzo Abe) has been reduced by almost 40% since October 2024.

=== Potential candidates emerge ===
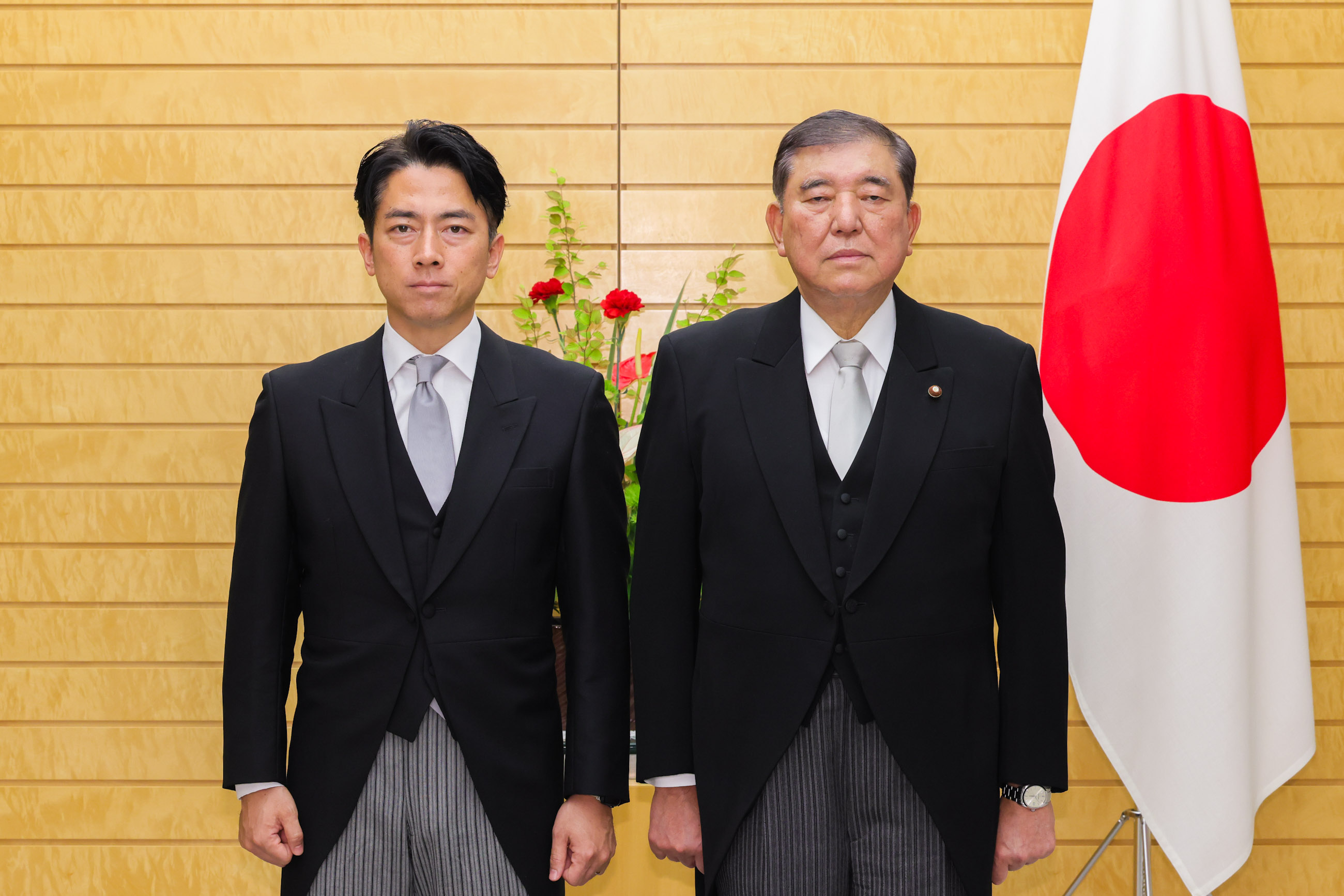
Shinjiro Koizumi was appointed to the cabinet by Shigeru Ishiba in May 2025.

Even before Ishiba announced his resignation, several senior LDP members were floated by the media as possible successors to him as party president, with some members even hinting at the possibility of running. On 18 July 2025, before the Upper House election was even held, Sanae Takaichi said she had “already made up her mind” about running and expressed desire to become LDP president. The day after the election, she met with some of her supporters, as well as former prime minister and party elder Tarō Asō. Takayuki Kobayashi, a fellow staunch conservative and candidate in the previous leadership election, also met with supporters. Kobayashi met with them again in August.

Shinjiro Koizumi, a son of former prime minister Junichiro Koizumi and former cabinet minister under Shinzo Abe, was appointed as Agriculture Minister by Ishiba in May 2025. Later in August, after the Upper House elections, he met with former prime minister Fumio Kishida; Koizumi came in third place in the previous presidential race with support from some of Kishida's faction members. Koizumi later met with Tarō Aso that same month. When he was asked if he was considering running earlier in July, Koizumi avoided the question, instead claiming he would primarily focus on rice policy.

Chief Cabinet Secretary Yoshimasa Hayashi, a veteran conservative who had served under numerous prime ministers, stated his intention to continue supporting Ishiba on 22 July, the day of the Upper House election. Due to the government's minority status, Nikkei Asia reported that the next party leader would have to have good connections with the opposition. Sankei Shimbun reported that the expectation was that the next leadership election would be between Koizumi and Takaichi.

=== Pressure builds and emergency election considered ===
On 6 August, Ishiba ordered an investigation into political party branches over corporate donations, which prompted criticism from within the party. During a joint plenary session on 8 August, the LDP decided that it would determine whether or not to move forward with an "emergency presidential election” based on opinions by lawmakers and prefectural branch chiefs. During the meeting, Ishiba repeated his intention to stay in office. A majority of lawmakers and prefectural branch chiefs (172 at the time) was required to demand a presidential election. A joint meeting of both houses of parliament was held on 8 August, with 253 members in attendance and 35 speaking. At the meeting, it was decided that the LDP Presidential Election Management Committee would consider whether to hold an early presidential election in accordance with Article 6, Paragraph 4 of the LDP rules.

Later on 13 August, Ishiba repeated his intention to continue in office as the LDP began to consider holding an emergency presidential election to force Ishiba to face the party in another leadership vote. The LDP's presidential election management committee began to discuss on the procedures for deciding whether or not to hold a special presidential election on 19 August. The committee announced the following day that they would begin the process once the party's internal review of the Upper House election was completed. Kyodo News reported that the committee would explore the idea of disclosing the names of lawmakers who sign a paper demanding that a special election take place. This was confirmed on 27 August with the deadline to confirm lawmakers intentions being announced as 8 September. NHK reported on 28 August that the party would solidify its decision in September. Deliberations continued within the party as the LDP's General Review Committee compiled its review of the election results.

The LDP Presidential Election Management Committee met on 19 August, and it was decided to proceed with consideration of the method of confirmation, which would involve having Diet members who wish to hold an early presidential election submit their request in writing. Regarding the advancement of the presidential election, while there are forces defending Ishiba, there is also a growing opinion that Ishiba should be held accountable and that an emergency presidential election should be held instead, coming from non-mainstream factions such as the former Abe, Motegi, and Nikai factions, as well as young and mid-career Diet members and some prefectural federations. Even among the three political officials (Vice Ministers and Parliamentary Vice-Ministers) in the Ishiba Cabinet, Kobayashi Fumiaki, Saito Hiroaki, and Kanda Junichi, there are calls for an emergency presidential election, and some have even expressed a willingness to resign from their positions if necessary.

On 31 August, the protests calling for the resignation of the Ishiba administration was held in front of the Prime Minister's Office, with 4,000 people (according to the organizers) attending. However, compared to the "Ishiba Resign Demonstration" held on the 25th of the previous month, which was attended by 1,200 people (according to the organizers) in support of the continued existence of the Ishiba administration, it received almost no coverage, and Senator Masashi Nishida questioned the media's reporting stance.

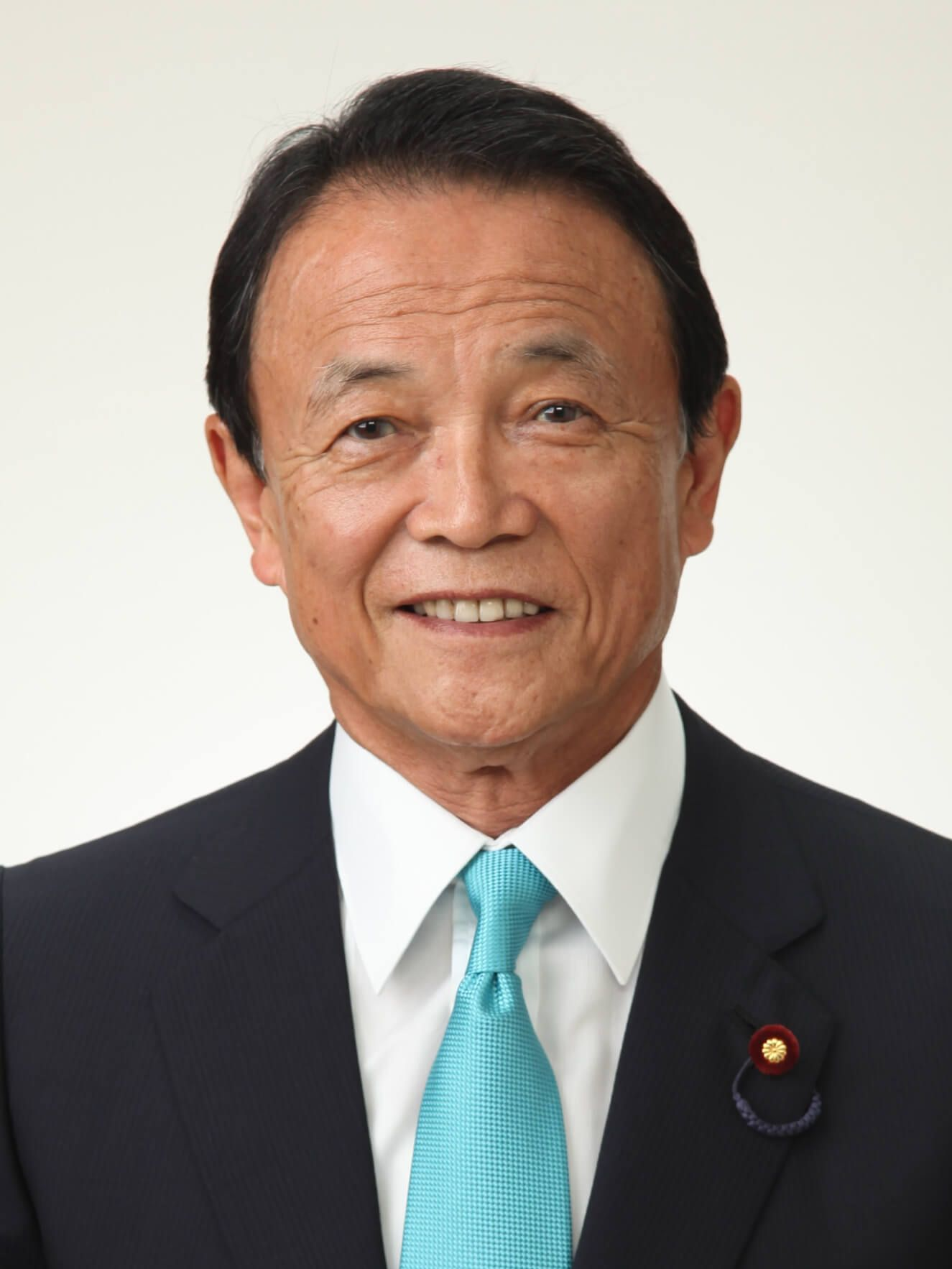
LDP Special Advisor Taro Aso announced his support for an emergency presidential election on 3 September 2025. Animosity had developed between Ishiba and Aso since Aso was prime minister between 2008 and 2009.

Support for Ishiba within his cabinet was mixed. Digital Minister Masaaki Taira stated he would "naturally support" Ishiba if he were to stand for re-election in a hypothetical emergency election. Economic Revitalization Minister Ryosei Akazawa, who had spearheaded negotiations regarding tariffs with the Trump Administration in the United States, said he would also support Ishiba. Akazawa, also hailing from Ishiba's own Tottori Prefecture, said he took immense pride in his role as Ishiba's aide. Ishiba's defense minister, Gen Nakatani stated bluntly that "The LDP should not hold a special presidential election" on 26 August. Foreign Minister Takeshi Iwaya stated that an emergency election would have a “negative impact” on Japanese foreign policy, as it would disrupt continuity. Cracks started to form in late August, as junior cabinet ministers began to speak out in favor of an emergency election. Parliamentary Vice Minister of Justice Junichi Kanda said on 27 August that he was considering resigning from the Cabinet to advocate for a special election.

In a statement on Twitter the following day, State Minister (Deputy Minister) of the Environment Fumiaki Kobayashi said that a special presidential election should be held as soon as possible, claiming he would resign as a vice minister if necessary. The day afterwards, several members of the Mortegi faction, including Deputy Minister of Agriculture, Forestry and Fisheries Hiroyoshi Sasagawa, agreed to support an early leadership election. That same day, former Economic Minister Takayuki Kobayashi, himself a candidate in the previous leadership candidate, said he would sign documentation requesting an emergency election. On 31 August, Deputy Finance Minister Hiroaki Saito announced his support for a special election. This was followed almost immediately by similar calls from Parliamentary Vice Minister of Land, Infrastructure, Transport and Tourism Yasuhiro Takami, former Education Minister Masahiko Shibayama, and House of Councilors Member Hiroshi Yamada.

As more party lawmakers began to speak out, focus began to shift towards prefectural party chapters; some MPs said they would make a decision based on the wishes of their local community. By 4 September, the party chapters in the prefectures of Hokkaido, Hyogo, Kagawa, Ehime, and Miyazaki all called for a special election. Fukushima, Okayama, and Oita prefectures, opted not to call for an election. Party chapters in Ibaraki, Yamagata, Ibaraki, Saitama, Niigata, Yamanashi, and Nagano prefectures "consolidated opinions” in favor of an election, while 33 prefectural federations continued to debate their own respective responses. The previous day, LDP Special Advisor, former prime minister, and power-broker Taro Aso, declared his support for an early leadership election. Aso had been calling for Ishiba to step down since the Upper House election in July, and had feelings of animosity towards Ishiba ever since the days when Aso was party president between 2008 and 2009 when Ishiba called on Aso to resign. Agriculture Minister Shinjirō Koizumi meanwhile defended junior ministers calling for a special election, saying, "It would be strange for them not to feel a sense of crisis after losing [a majority in] both the House of Representatives and House of Councillors..." He continued to call for party unity, and said he would make up his mind after the review of the results was completed. In late August, former defense minister Tomomi Inada stated she understood public opinion questioning why lawmakers implicated in the slush fund scandal "who have not taken responsibility themselves" were pressuring Ishiba to step down. As August came to close, it was becoming clear that while the LDP's party approval had fallen, Ishiba Cabinet approval had increased.

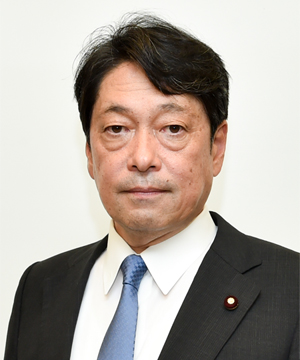
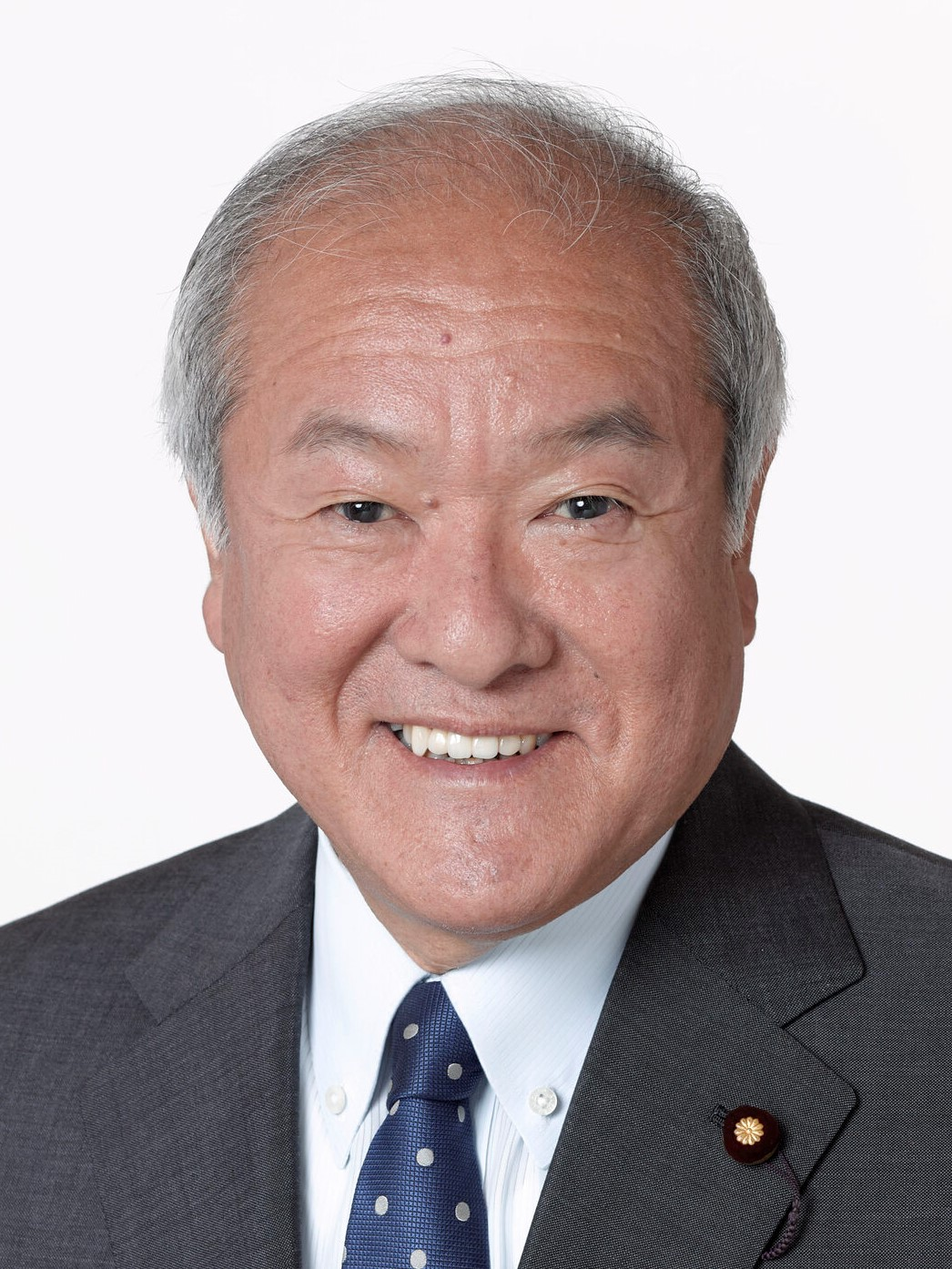
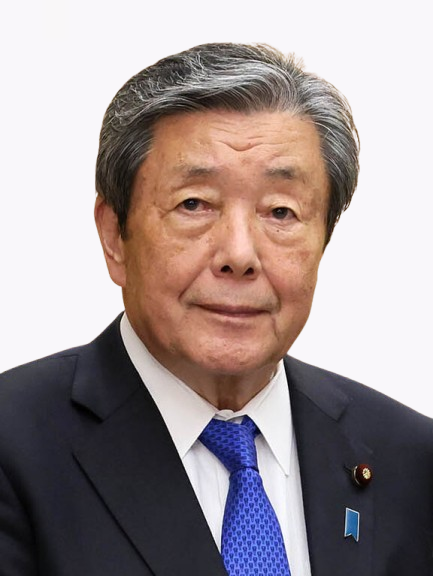
Three senior party executives, Policy Research Council Chairman Itsunori Onodera, LDP General Affairs Chairman Shun'ichi Suzuki, and Secretary-General Hiroshi Moriyama, all announced their resignations on 2 September 2025.

At a "Joint Party Meeting of Members of both Houses of Parliament" held on 2 September, the LDP published its summary of Upper House election results, stating that its measures to combat rising prices did not resonate with the public and that it lost trust due to issues related to politics and money. Ishiba once again apologized for the loss of a majority, and clarified "I am not at all clinging to my position, but rather it is my responsibility to make proper decisions at the appropriate time." He subsequently told reporters that he intended to stay in office. That same day, three senior party executives resigned their positions seemingly simultaneously. LDP Policy Research Council Chairman Itsunori Onodera, LDP General Affairs Chairman Shun'ichi Suzuki, and LDP secretary-general Hiroshi Moriyama all conveyed their intentions to resign to Ishiba.

After this, Ishiba reiterated once again that he intended to remain as prime minister. As this was happening, some members of Ishiba's cabinet continued to reiterate their support. Foreign Minister Takeshi Iwaya said that there was “no need” and “no time” for an emergency leadership election, and that "There is no one better suited to the job than Prime Minister Ishiba." Discontent continued to brew however, former Economic Minister and previous leadership candidate Sanae Takaichi called for a special election. Koizumi continued to give unclear answers, simply stating that "it is not good at all for the public to continue to see the image of a party in a state of disarray.” and that he would “face this issue head on."

In a survey, NHK reported that ~100 lawmakers supported an election, 50 oppose, ~100 were undecided, around 30 refused to comment, and ~10 were unreachable. Pressure only continued to mount as Deputy Minister of Justice Masahiro Kōmura announced on Facebook on 3 September that he would support an early presidential election, followed by Deputy Minister of Education Arata Takebe and Deputy Minister of Digital Affairs Yasushi Hosaka. On 4 September, Koizumi stressed that “we don't have time to waste on political battles” and once said he felt a sense of crisis. That same day, party chapters from Oita and Okayama decided not to call for an early election. Ishiba continued to repeat that he planned to remain prime minister. In early September, Chief Cabinet Secretary Yoshimasa Hayashi met with about 10 LDP lawmakers close to him. LDP Chief Advisor Aso and former secretary-general Toshimitsu Motegi met the same month.

On the evening of 5 September, Ishiba met with close allies within his cabinet, including Foreign Minister Iwatake and Minister of Internal Affairs and Communications Seiichiro Murakami, at a hotel in Tokyo. Earlier that day, Minister of Justice Keisuke Suzuki became the first cabinet minister to support an early presidential election, writing that "to restore trust in the party, it is necessary for the party to unite and start anew from scratch." That same day, a Kyodo survey of the LDP's 295 lawmakers found that over 120 lawmakers supported an emergency presidential election, while just under 50 opposed it. By this point, Ishiba had reportedly threatened to ask the Emperor to dissolve the House of Representatives and call a general election, which would require invoking Article 7 of the Constitution. On the following night, on 6 September, both Koizumi and former prime minister Yoshihide Suga (who had served as Vice President of the Liberal Democratic Party under Ishiba) reportedly urged Ishiba to resign at the Prime Minister's Official Residence in Tokyo.

=== Ishiba resigns ===
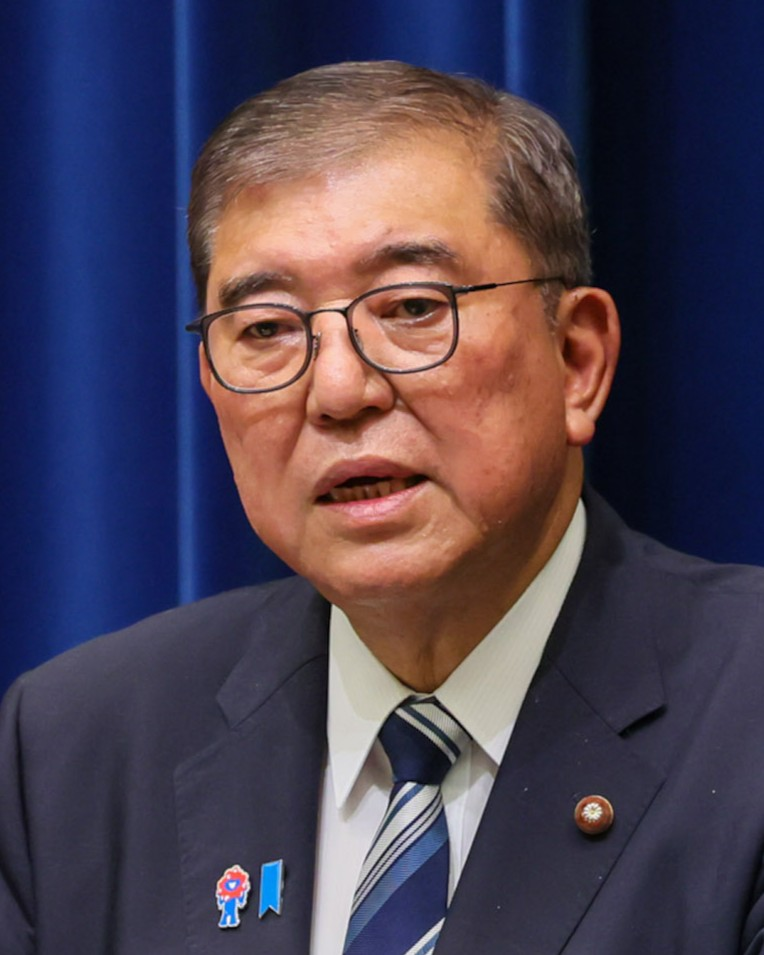

"Now that negotiations on U.S. tariff measures have reached a conclusion, I believe this is the appropriate time to step aside and make way for the next generation."

— Shigeru Ishiba, 7 September 2025

The Press Conference in which Ishiba resigned as PM

On 7 September, Shigeru Ishiba announced that he would resign as President of the Liberal Democratic Party of Japan. The Japan Times reported that pressure from Suga, and Koizumi in particular, was key in Ishiba's decision, as the latter "urged" him to quit after staying at the official residence for about 2 hours (Suga had only stayed for 30 minutes).

At a press conference at the Prime Minister's Office, Ishiba stated he sought to claim "responsibility" as party leader for losses in recent elections, and to avoid dividing the party. Ishiba's announcement effectively cancelled the emergency election process entirely. He instead instructed Moriyama, whose resignation had not been accepted by Ishiba, to begin the process to hold an extraordinary presidential election. Ishiba said he determined now was the "appropriate time" to step aside, after a written version of the Japan–U.S. tariff agreement had been finalized.

In his exit speech, Ishiba touted various accomplishments; 67 out of 68 bills submitted by the government had been passed by the Diet (in part thanks to opposition parties). Ishiba said strides were made in improving the work conditions of JSDF personnel. He also said he felt confident in his foreign policy, citing successful meetings with US president Donald Trump, South Korean president Lee Jae Myung, and Indian prime minister Narendra Modi. Ishiba said he was "filled with deep regret" that he was unable to meet the expectations of the Japanese people. Ishiba stated he felt his biggest regret in particular was failing to address public distrust in politics, citing the continuing impact of the slush funds scandal. Ishiba said he was concerned that the LDP was losing the public's trust, which could lead to Japan falling into populism. He urged the party to "restart from scratch" in order to change the public perception that the party had not changed at all. Ishiba promised to continue serving as prime minister until a new leader was elected, and did not endorse a candidate in the subsequent election. His tenure lasted about one year.

== Campaign ==
=== Race begins to take shape ===
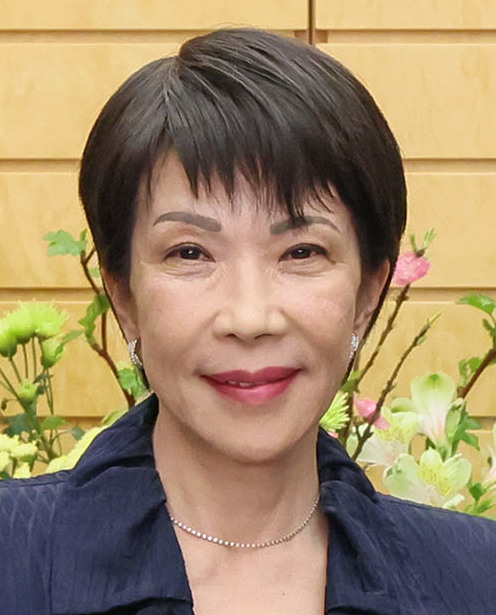
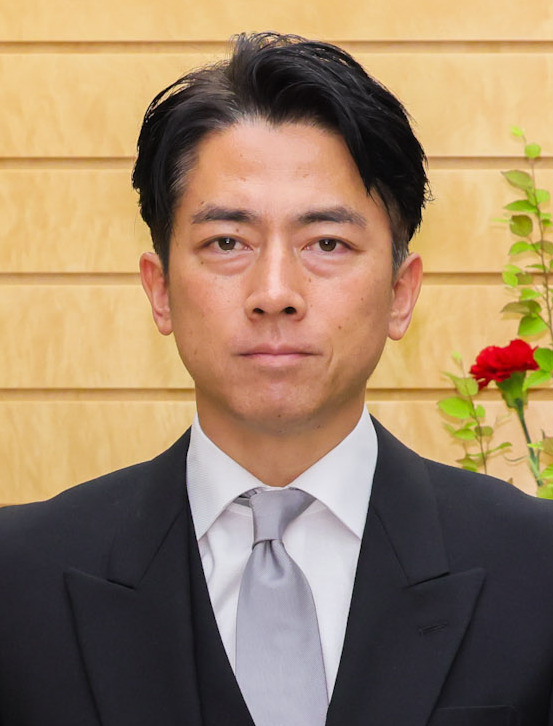
Shortly after the resignation announcement of Shigeru Ishiba, polling and media reports found former presidential candidates Sanae Takaichi and Shinjiro Koizumi as the frontrunners of the election

Sanae Takaichi, Shinjiro Koizumi, and Yoshimasa Hayashi were seen as potential candidates by Nikkei Asia upon Ishiba's resignation, with Takaichi and Koizumi being called early frontrunners. All three had run in the previous presidential election, and while Takaichi had served as Economic Security Minister under Fumio Kishida, Koizumi and Hayashi were serving members of the cabinet, as Agriculture Minister and Chief Cabinet Secretary, respectively. Among the general public, opinion polls showed Koizumi and Takaichi were deadlocked at 19.3% each. President magazine predicted that a dark-horse candidate, beyond Koizumi and Takaichi, could emerge in the race to rebuild the party from scratch.

On 8 September, the race began to take shape. Ishiba clarified that he had “no problems” with cabinet ministers seeking the presidency, and would not attempt to block anyone from doing so. Ishiba later implied he thought Koizumi, with whom he held similar policy beliefs, was a suitable successor. The day following the resignation announcement, Takayuki Kobayashi told reporters he would discuss possibly running in the election with colleagues, before making a decision, but hinted at party unity being a theme of his potential campaign. The same day, Toshimitsu Motegi announced to reporters that he would be running in the leadership election. The former party Secretary-General became the first to throw his hat in the ring. He said he was “convinced” he would be able to gather the 20 signatures necessary to officially run. Later that morning, it was reported that Hayashi planned to announce his campaign. He said he wanted to consult with some of his colleagues before making the decision. The party's Yamaguchi Prefecture branch reportedly urged Hayashi to run. After conveying his intention to former prime minister Fumio Kishida, who supported Hayashi in his last leadership bid, Hayashi solidified his intentions to run. The Sankei Shimbun reported the same day that Takaichi was preparing a campaign of her own, and was beginning to gather endorsements from party members.

=== First campaign announcements ===
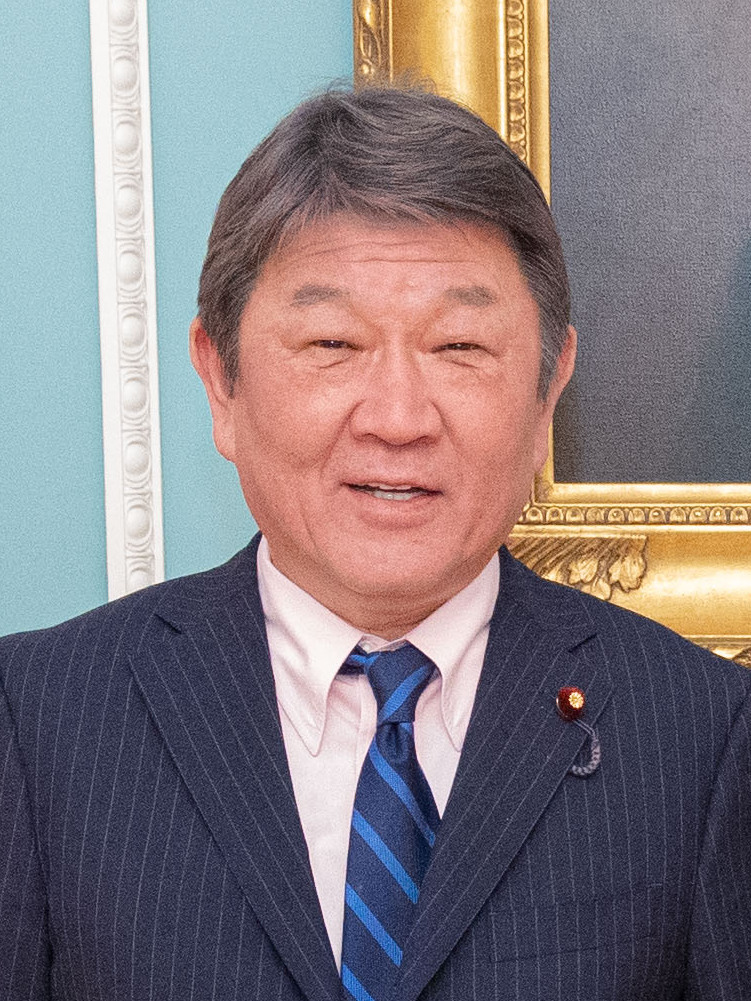
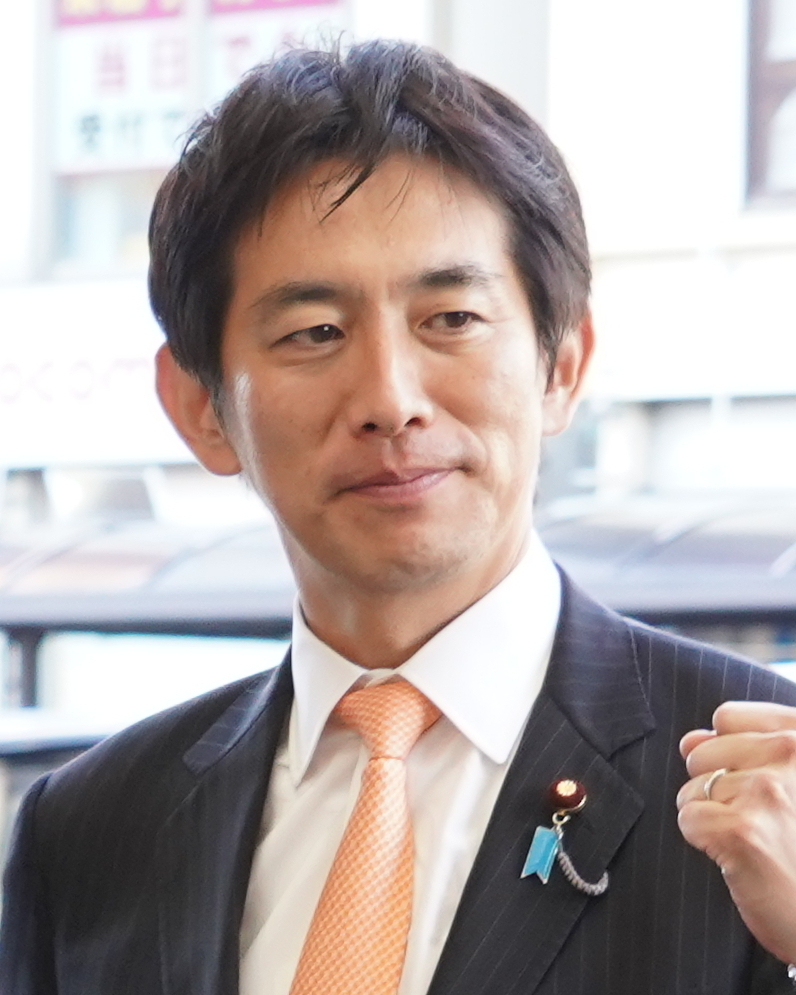
Toshimitsu Motegi and Takayuki Kobayashi were among the first to declare their candidacies

As the LDP was leading a minority government in the lower house, the party president's relationship with opposition parties, including potential coalition partners, was a factor in the election. The Komeito, a coalition partner of the LDP since Shinzo Abe began his second premiership in 2012, warned the LDP against deviating from "conservative centrism”. According to the Yomiuri Shimbun, Hayashi and Koizumi had maintained good relations with Ishin no Kai, which had been flirting with the idea a coalition with the LDP since the Upper House elections. Koizumi met with Ishin leader Hirofumi Yoshimura in August while Hayashi met with former Ishin leader Nobuyuki Baba on 8 September. Motegi was said to have good relations with the Democratic Party For the People (DPFP), while Takaichi had ideological similarities with Sanseitō. Sankei claimed that senior members of Komeito's leadership threatened to leave the coalition with the LDP if Takaichi succeeded Ishiba. As with the past election, party bosses influenced the election. In early September, former prime minister Fumio Kishida, urged the party to use the leadership selection as an opportunity to position it a moderate center-right conservative party. Later that month, it was reported that former prime minister Tarō Asō was considering Koizumi as his top choice.

On 10 September, Motegi held a press conference, during which he said he would seek to expand the current government coalition in order to achieve government stability. Not unlike Koizumi, Motegi stated his opposition to banning corporations from making donations, and also said he would try to reduce the number of foreign workers in Japan over time. That same day, it was reported Kobayashi had finalized his plans to run. Kobayashi held a press conference the next day announcing that he would run for the party presidency in his second leadership bid. After a meeting with the DPFP's Kazuya Shimba, Koizumi reportedly laughed when he was asked by the former if he would run. The following day, Representative Hitoshi Kikawada told NHK that Takaichi would run. Motegi's campaign meanwhile announced support for tax cuts to stimulate economic growth. As momentum from his home Kanagawa Prefecture grew for Koizumi to run, he said he would make a final decision after meeting with local supporters. By 12 September, Hayashi's poll numbers had begun to rise as Takaichi and Koizumi continued to compete for first place among said polls. The next day, Koizumi met with supporters, informing them he would stand in the election.

=== The Big Three: Hayashi, Takaichi, Koizumi ===
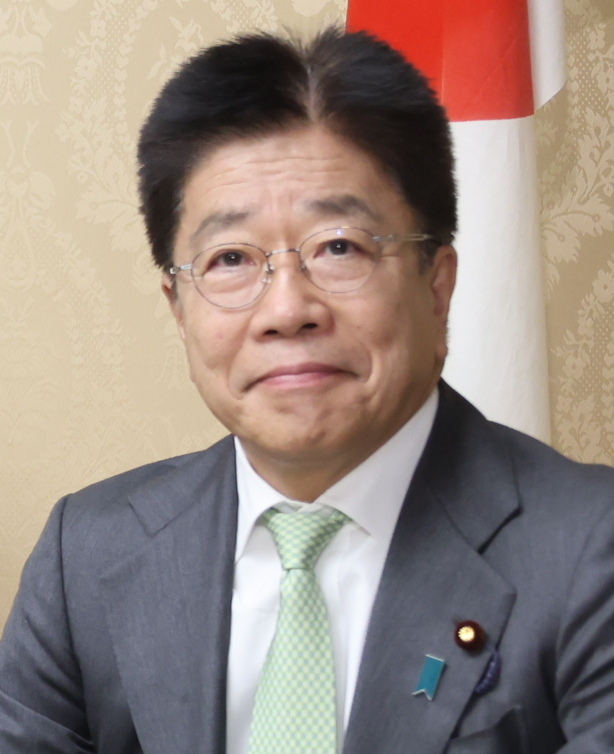
Finance Minister Katsunobu Katō, a staunch conservative who ran in the previous election, was announced as Koizumi's campaign manager.

On 16 September, Hayashi held a press conference affirming his intent to run in the presidential election, planning to release a full manifesto at the campaign launch held a few days later. Hayashi pledged to continue the work started by the Kishida and Ishiba administrations, running as a continuity of candidate while embracing some policies of his own. Some of his initial policies included amending the Constitution and increasing wages to counter the effects of inflation. Hayashi, who had 30 years of experience when he entered the race, expressed regret over Ishiba's resignation, but said he was open to expanding the government coalition to include more parties. Hayashi was endorsed by Defense Minister Gen Nakatani not long after the press conference ended. Shortly after Hayashi's brief press conference, Kobayashi held one of his own, which served as his official campaign announcement. Kobayashi had reportedly been urged by Kōichi Hagiuda, an ally of the late Shinzo Abe, to support Takaichi instead of running his own campaign. Running on the image of "generational change" Kobayashi said he "felt a strong sense of crisis" and would seek to rebuild the party after the successive election losses, and would focus on working with opposition parties; Motegi meanwhile had continued to advocate for expanding the coalition.

Promising to return Japan to its status as "technological superpower”, Kobayashi said he would introduce tax cuts and raise defense spending beyond 2% of GDP. He also expressed concern about misinformation spreading on social media, and said he would work to stop foreign powers such as China from interfering in Japanese society and democracy. Presenting himself as a bridge between conservative policies and the younger generations, Kobayashi announced Yasukazu Hamada, a former defense minister, as his campaign manager. Later that same day, Shinjiro Koizumi confirmed, during a press conference in his capacity as Agriculture Minister, that he also intended to run in the election. Before official campaigning began, Koizumi attempted to moderate his reformist image by appealing to conservatives within the party. On 15 September, Finance Minister and staunch conservative Katsunobu Katō opted against running in the election and endorsed Koizumi. Katō, who had run in the previous presidential election, was announced as Koizumi's campaign manager; Kato had reportedly been approached by Takaichi's campaign but ultimately declined to endorse her. Koizumi stressed the importance of party unity, and said he would shelf several policies he had previously advocated, such as legislation for selective surnames for married couples. Nikkei reported this was becoming a common theme in the election, with most candidates avoiding major policy proposals that could further divide the party.

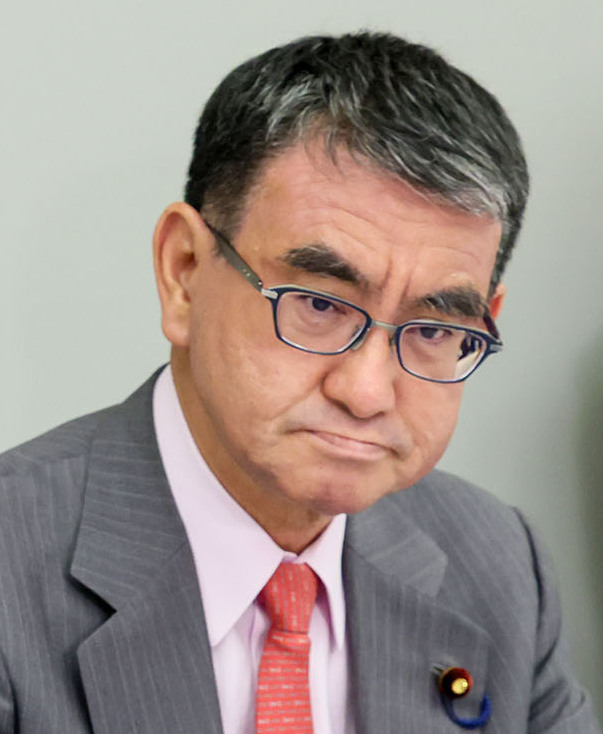
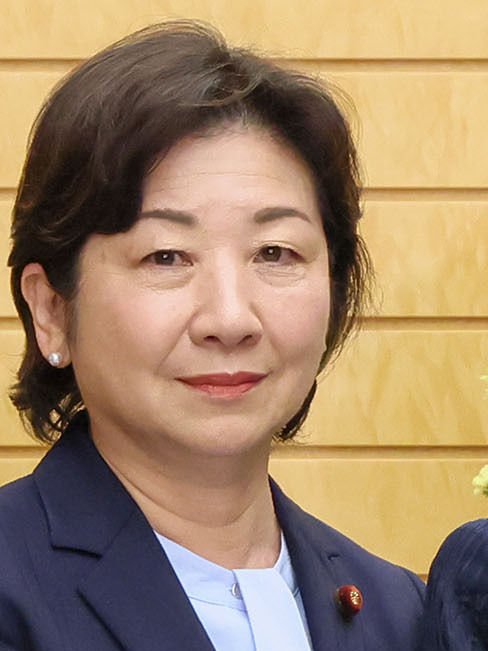
Both Taro Kono and Seiko Noda declined to run again for the LDP leadership and instead endorsed Shinjirō Koizumi's candidacy.

On 18 September, Hayashi held his campaign announcement press conference, during which he revealed the policies of his “Hayashi Plan”, which would aim to "create a future for Japan in which everyone can have dreams, hopes, and pride." Vowing to make full use of is experience, Hayashi said he would pursue internal reforms to rebuild the image of the LDP, as well as realize 1% wage increases and legislation to ensure social security would be sustainable by the 2040s, which would he said would help create a more resilient economy. While generally socially moderate on social issues, the Hayashi Plan included proposals to reintroduce the system of multiple-seat constituencies, as a way to potentially address competition in single-member districts, which had been in use since the 1996 general election. Hayashi said the party should unite under a “conservative” platform, in what The Japan Times said was an appeal to party members who preferred a moderate conservative vision as opposed to a more right-leaning one. Hayashi became the third candidate to officially enter the race, after Motegi and Kobayashi.

The same day as Hayashi's announcement, Sanae Takaichi confirmed her own campaign. While not elaborating on policies, Takaichi was believed to be a proponent of government stimulus, having been described as a “fiscal dove”. Meanwhile, it was reported that Koizumi had sought advise from former prime minister Fumio Kishida; Seiji Kihara, another conservative, joined his campaign. By then, Koizumi was leading most opinion polls, followed by Takaichi, as Hayashi and Motegi were mostly tied for third place. Earlier that day, Hayashi met with the DPFP's Kazuya Shimba, as Koizumi met with LDP party elder Tarō Asō. Hours later, former Digital Minister Taro Kono and former Birthrate Minister Seiko Noda, both candidates in previous presidential elections, announced their intentions not to run, with both endorsing Koizumi for president.

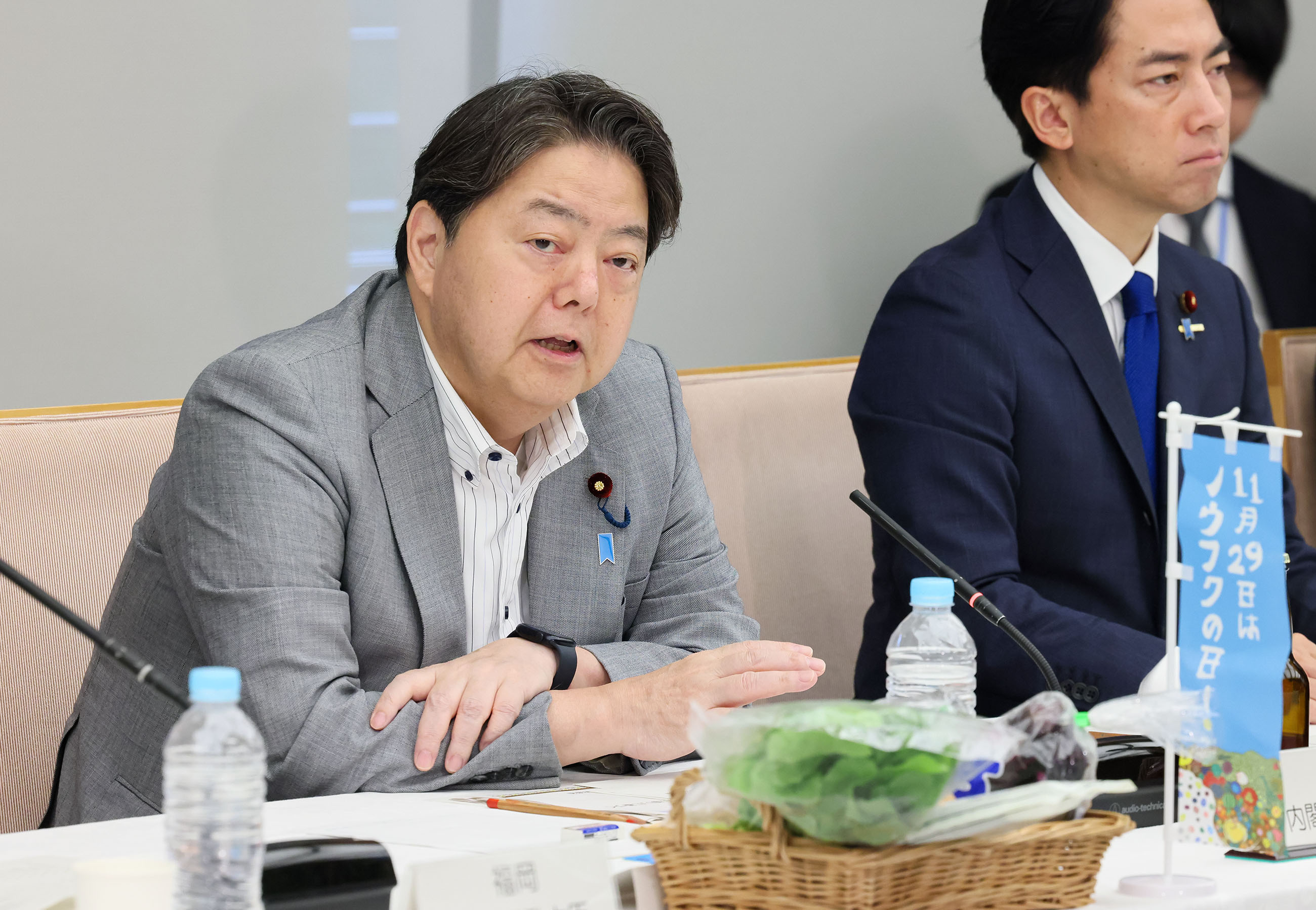
Cabinet ministers Yoshimasa Hayashi (left) and Shinjirō Koizumi (right) both announced their campaigns the week of 15 September. While Hayashi campaigned as a continuity candidate, Koizumi softened his reformist image to broaden his appeal.

With the influence of the far-right diminished after the party's election losses, Takaichi attempted to moderate her image to appeal to a broader voter base; when she was asked about setting a clear defense spending target or visiting the controversial Yasukuni Shrine, Takaichi avoided giving a clear answer, and also expressed willingness to work with opposition parties. To help increase take-home pay, Takaichi said she would pursue a policy of "cash handouts + tax deductions" while also declaring her support for raising the income tax threshold and removing taxes on gasoline, policies supported by several opposition parties. At her press conference held on 19 September, Takaichi stated "We must once again proclaim, 'Japan is back.' I stand here with a lofty ambition and a burning desire to 'take Japan to the top of the world once again.' We must strengthen Japan's national strength." Takaichi had to apologize twice after the host of her campaign launch, LDP MP Hitoshi Kikawada, singled out reporters by skin color. Kikawada, who served as the moderator for the press conference, called on reporters using the phrases, "someone with darker skin" and "someone with lighter skin." The fourth candidate to enter the race, this was Takaichi's third leadership election.

On 20 September, Koizumi officially announced his campaign. In his press conference, Koizumi stated, "I am determined to take the lead in rebuilding the LDP into a party that realizes the peace of mind and safety desired by the people." Promising to abolish the gasoline tax and have a budget ready by the fall. Like other candidates, Koizumi said he was open to expanding the coalition government. Koizumi said he would “rebuild” the LDP after ‘failing to address the public's concerns and lacked the imagination to support those suffering from rising prices.’ Koizumi's policy platform included increasing foreign investment, increasing wages by ¥1 million over five years, income tax reform, improvement of working conditions, ensuring the 2% of GDP on defense goal will be met, regional revitalization, and internal party reform. On the issue of selective surnames, Koizumi calcified that while his personal opinion remained unchanged, he believed party unity took precedent. Sankei reported that shelving these and other policies had the potential to hurt Koizumi's reformist image. On the same day, former foreign minister Yōko Kamikawa, a candidate in the previous election, announced that she would not run. With Koizumi's entry into the race, he was the fifth and final candidate, setting the stage for a 12-day official campaign period beginning on 22 September.

=== Official campaigning begins ===
At Koizumi's campaign launch, 92 Diet members attended, a major surge from the previous year. Many MPs remained undecided, however. Koizumi said he would see party revival. Former Minister of Health, Labour and Welfare Norihisa Tamura served as Hayashi's campaign manager for the second consecutive year. At the start of the campaign, only Koizumi praised Ishiba, while Hayashi said he would seek continuity between Ishiba and his own administration. The Japan Times wrote that the campaign reflected a “mix of youth and experience”.

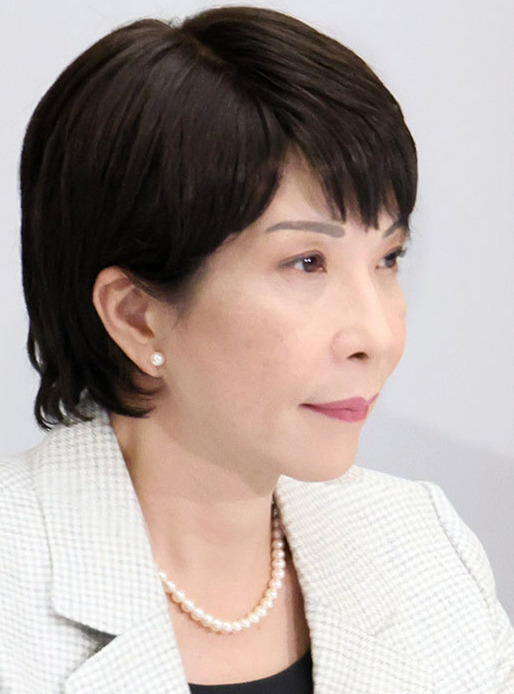
Takaichi's polling numbers briefly benefited following the first two debates.

As the official campaign period began, Koizumi and Takaichi were among the frontrunners based on opinion polling. Shortly before the campaign period began, Takaichi led in polls amongst party members while Koizumi led polls among party supporters. Takaichi benefited from a great number of supporters among the Seiwa Seisaku Kenkyūkai, Shikōkai and Shisuikai factions. Koizumi benefited most from the Heisei Kenkyūkai faction and those who did not identify with a faction. Hayashi received the most support from the Kōchikai faction and those who did not identify with a faction. Kobayashi received the most support from factionless LDP members while Motegi was overwhelmingly supported by the Heisei Kenkyūkai faction. At the opening joint press conference that was held on 22 September at party headquarters to officially kick off the campaign, Kobayashi came out for support of nuclear energy. He also supported income tax cuts. Most other candidates expressed negative views towards tax cuts however. Hayashi meanwhile supported broad deregulation.

On 23 September, after policy speeches from each candidate, a debate was held at party headquarters, hosted by the LDP Youth Bureau and Women's Bureau. Cost of living, tax reform, and childcare, headlined as major issues. Efforts to restore trust in the party and immigration were also discussed. While all candidates varied somewhat in their views on immigration, all candidates supported general restrictions to some degree, with the primary concern being misuse of welfare, impact of foreign workers, and avoiding mass migration seen in Europe. Debate on social issues, such as serprate surnames for married couples or same-sex marriage, was largely stalled however, as no candidate took a clear stance. Koizumi continued to emphasize party unity.

Ultimately, no one mentioned a specific opposition party they would work with in general or to expand the coalition. Motegi, Koizumi, and Takaichi seemed eager to expand the coalition, while Hayashi and Kobayashi seemed hesitant. Takaichi continued to express more conservative views, while Koizumi sought to find common ground. All candidates supported strengthening the U.S.-Japan alliance. During a debate on TBS taking place on 23 September, Takaichi and Kobayashi both said they believed the slush fund scandal was “over” and that the party should just move on and not pursue further investigations into implicated Diet members.

=== Koizumi and Takaichi battle for first place ===
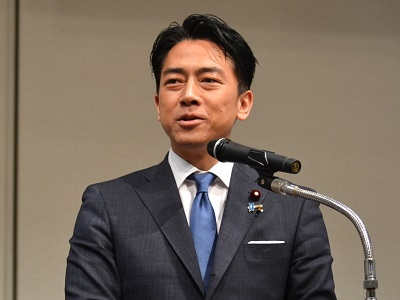
Shinjiro Koizumi maintained frontrunner status throughout the campaign. While he performed well with Diet members, he failed to capture enough votes from local party supporters.

On 24 September, a debate was held at the National Press Club in Tokyo. Economic policy was the main topic of discussion. The Japan Times wrote that the candidates failed to stand out on policy. Nevertheless, divisions on immigration were exposed in the debate, with Hayashi saying some moderate gradual immigration would be necessary to offset the economic impact of a declining birthrate, while Motegi and Kobayashi opposed immigration outright, and said they would seek to limit foreign workers. Kobayashi also tried to differentiate himself from Koizumi, arguing he was more conservative. Takaichi sought economic growth by utilizing technologies while Koizumi emphasized inflation relief and wage increases. There was also disagreement on defense spending and cash handouts. Palestinian statehood was also brought up; Hayashi was the only candidate to describe it as a matter of ‘when not if’ when asked about it. That same day, the candidates appeared for a joint rally in front of Akihabara Station in Tokyo. Meanwhile, Ishiba stated he hoped his successor would be someone who served in his administration and would continue his policies. Takaichi and Koizumi continued to battle for first place in the polls.

After both debates, Takaichi took the lead amongst party supporters with Koizumi's support dropping. That same poll showed Yoshimasa Hayashi gaining traction, increasing his support in third place. In a 24 September interview, Hayashi announced his support for Ishin no Kai’s “second capital” initiative, which would see a secondary capital being established in Osaka Prefecture; this signaled a desire to work with Ishin, according to Jiji Press. The Asahi Shimbun noted the most candidates were “playing it safe” as they refused to make firm policy commitments. The Guardian described the election as “Koizumi's race to loose” and said elevating Koizumi would be a “gamble” to save the party from faltering approval and poor election performance.

=== Controversy and misinformation ===
==== “Foreigners assaulting deer in Nara” ====
During her opening campaign speech, Takaichi claimed that she was appalled by videos that showed “foreigners kicking deer” in her home prefecture of Nara. When asked how she confirmed that information was true, she claimed she self-verified it herself, but declined to provide any evidence. An official from Nara Prefecture said they were unable to verify whether or not the people Takaichi referenced were actually foreigners or not. There was in fact a video circulating that showed an individual in Nara kicking a deer, but their nationality was unknown.

==== Stealth campaigning ====
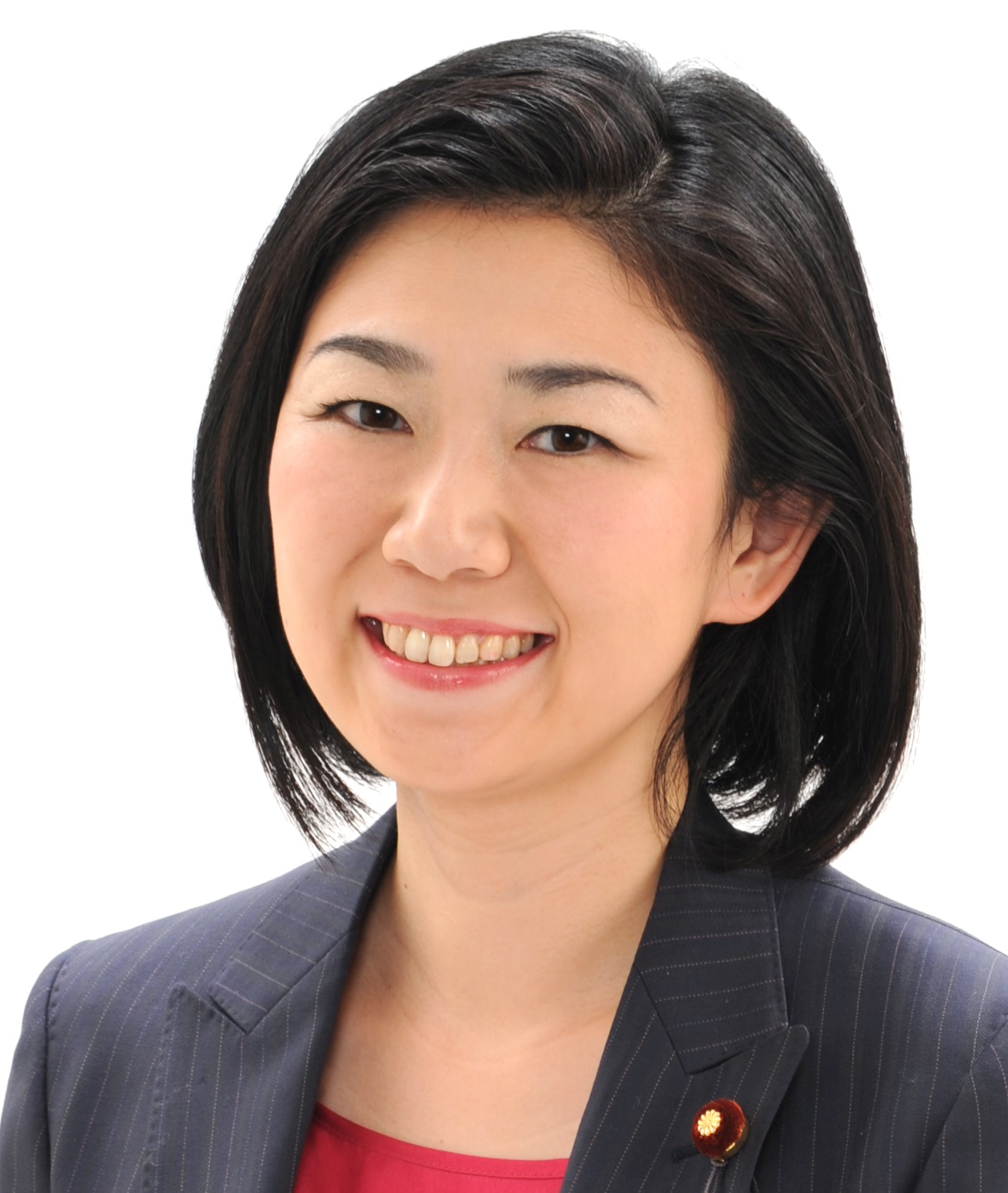
Representative Karen Makishima of Kanagawa resigned from the Koizumi campaign after allegations of stealth campaigning surfaced.

On 25 September, the weekly Shūkan Bunshun reported that Koizumi's campaign team asked supporters to write fake comments under live video feeds, supposedly to make it look as if the positive comments were organic. The tactic, described as “stealth marketing” or in this case, “stealth campaigning” was widely criticized. The following day, the Koizumi campaign's public relations manager, House of Representatives member and former Digital Affairs Minister Karen Makishima of Kanagawa Prefecture, claimed responsibility for the incident and resigned from the campaign. That same day, Koizumi issued an apology after admitting that a member of his election campaign team had asked supporters to post favorable comments about him, and comments attacking other candidates online. He also apologized for the agricultural ministry's handling of a licensing deal for a "prized grape variety" that sparked an official protest from producers. Although Koizumi claimed he was not personally aware of the fake comments scheme until the news was broken, and stated that Makishima acted on her own initiative, he admitted responsibility ultimately lay with him.

Reportedly, a single account online posted positive comments about Koizumi over 500 times under video livestreams. Makishima's office reportedly suggested 24 recommended comments for supporters to post. They included statements such as: “No doubt he'll be president”, “It's amazing he managed to persuade Mr. Ishiba”, “He just seems like a genuinely nice guy, you know?”, and “I prefer people who work diligently and honestly, without trying to be overly clever.” The LDP Presidential Election Management Committee warned several campaigns on 29 September over "incidents inciting emotional conflict between candidates" and "violation of election rules."

=== Hayashi surges, late endorsements, and talk of coalition expansion ===
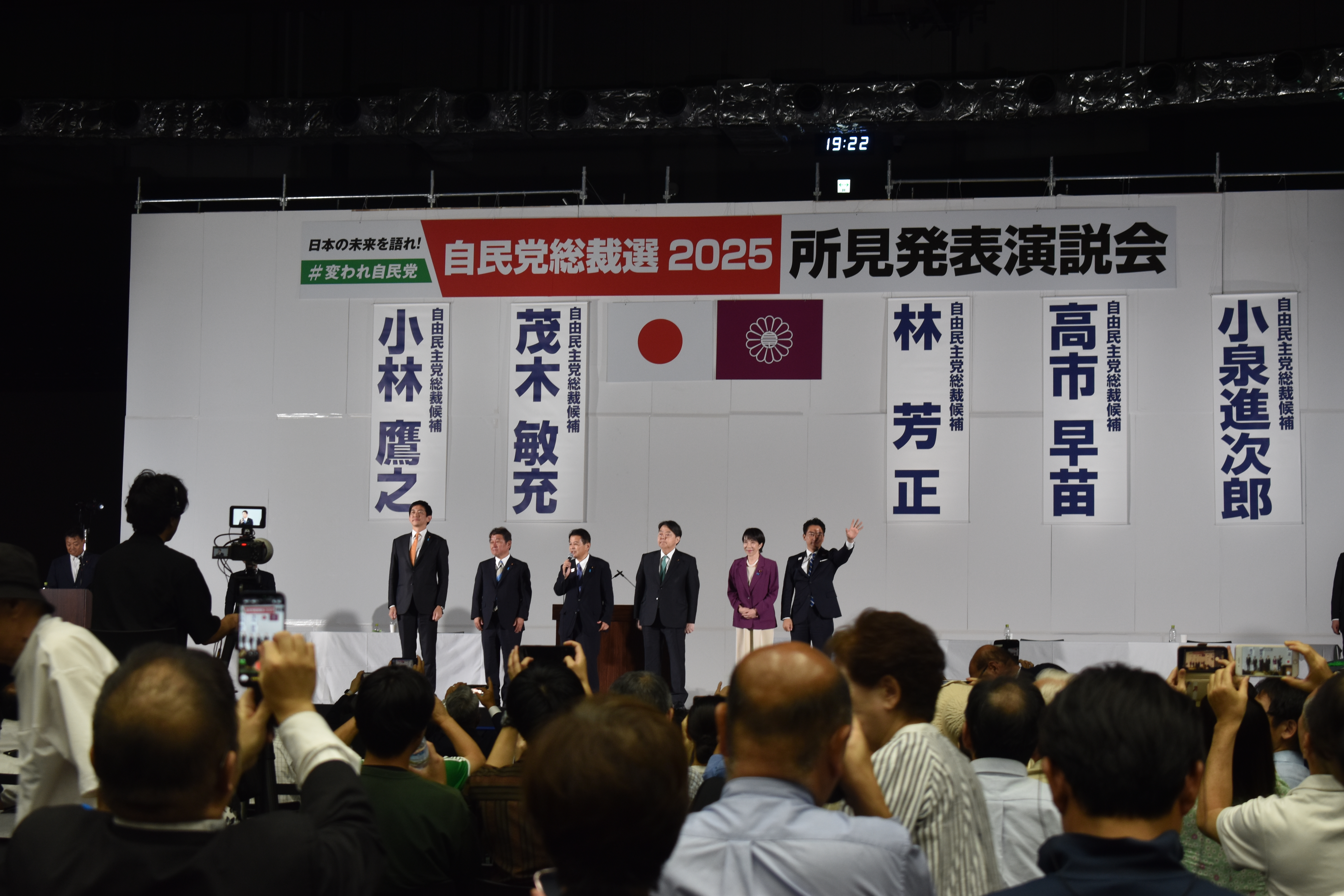
Speech event organized in Nagoya, Aichi Prefecture, 26 September 2025

Reuters reported that Hayashi was gradually becoming seen as an alternative third choice to Takaichi and Koizumi, considering his wealth of experience his technocratic style of politics. Central members of the former Kōchikai faction led by Fumio Kishida began to quietly rally behind Hayashi, as former party Secretary-General Makoto Koga, one of Hayashi's mentors, worked behind the scenes for Hayashi's campaign, even allegedly advising Koizumi not to run through Yoshihide Suga. Hayashi pledged to establish a “Content Agency” to help boost Japan's soft power, mainly through music and anime. On controversial issues like the Yasukuni Shrine, Hayashi proposed separating Class-A war criminals from others, which would allow the Emperor and the Imperial Family to pray there. A survey from the Yomiuri Shimbun showed Hayashi continued to trail Koizumi and Takaichi, with the latter being the most likely to advance to the runoff.

On 26 September, the candidates highlighted their respective strengths in speeches delivered in Nagoya of Aichi Prefecture. The following day, the candidates answered questions during an online internet program hosted by Hiroyuki Nishimura, the founder of 4chan. The topic was what the candidates would do during their first 100 Days in office; Kobayashi and Takaichi both said they would focus on the economy, Motegi said he would prioritize the US-Japan alliance, Koizumi stated he would form a budget, while Hayashi emphasized multi-party cooperation. At one point during the debate, the candidates were asked to close their eyes and point to another candidate they considered to be a suitable to serve as prime minister; only Hayashi participated, and pointed to Motegi. Hayashi was also the only candidate to praise the others in his closing remarks, and the only candidate to speak English when the candidates were asked a question in English; Koizumi, Kobayashi, and Motegi can also speak English. Koizumi continued to lead among Diet members while Takacihi performed better with local party members in the polls.

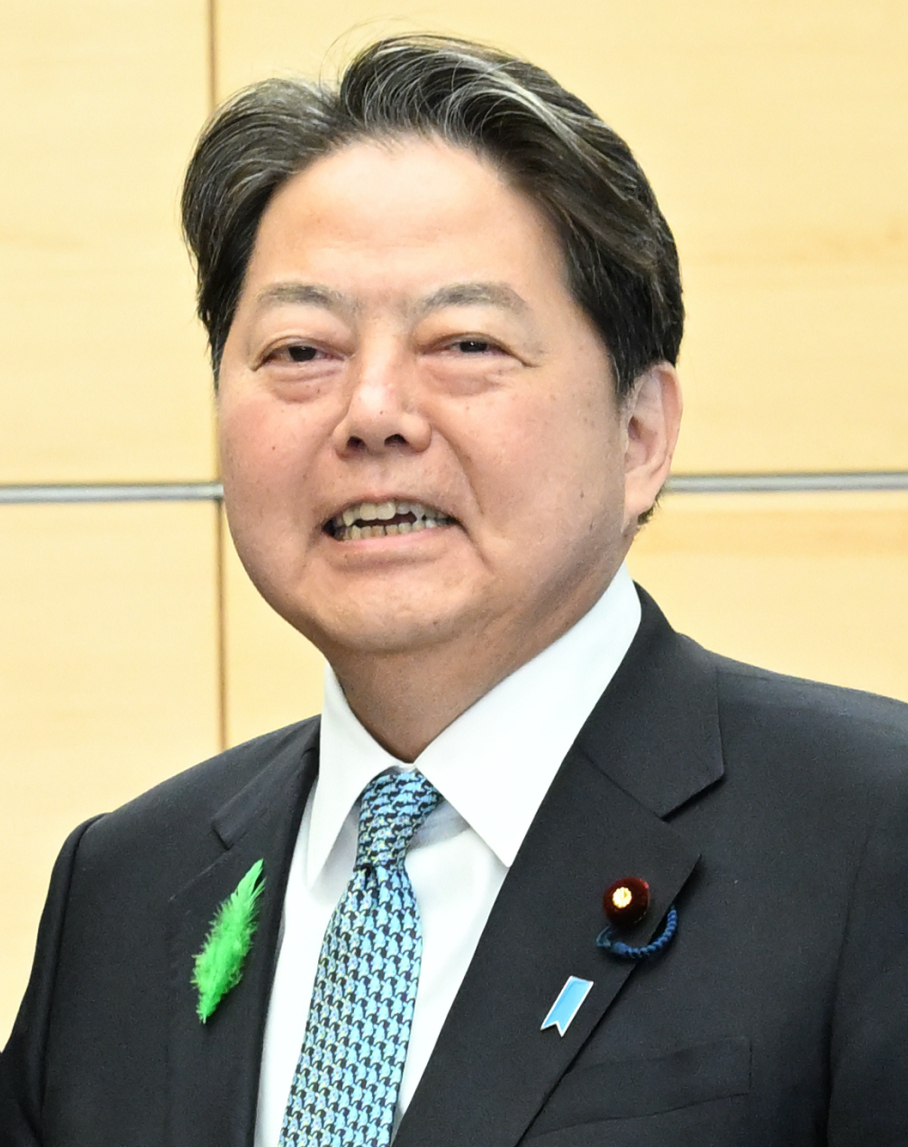
Yoshimasa Hayashi received a surge of support within the first week of the campaign.

On 28 September, the five candidates debated security policy on NHK. The same day, a poll showed Koizumi with a narrow lead over Takaichi among LDP members while also holding a substantial lead over her among LDP supporters. Bloomberg News noted that the LDP was split between Koizumi and Takaichi as to who was better to lead the party. That same evening, the candidates participated in another debate hosted by the live streaming video-sharing company Niconico. Once again, candidates were asked a question in English, about why they each wanted to become prime minister. This time, Takaichi, Motegi and Hayashi responded in English. When a question concerning same-sex marriage was asked, Takaichi stated her opposition to its legalization.

Hayashi continued to cultivate strong support in his home prefecture of Yamaguchi, also the home of the late former prime minister Shinzo Abe; the LDP Yamaguchi Prefectural Association held a rally for Hayashi in Yamaguchi City, where about 800 people showed up. On 29 September, Koizumi came out in favor of expanding the coalition in order to achieve more political stability, but cautioned that there must be a sense of trust between parties. That same day, FNN reported that Hayashi could be considered a frontrunner, as Koizumi suffered in popularity after the stealth campaign scandal broke; Hayashi's supporters attributed this surge to a “sense of stability” that Hayashi carried with him.

Koichi Hagiuda, a prominent member of the former Abe faction, announced his endorsement of Takachi on 26 September. Two days later, Foreign Minister Takeshi Iwaya, who led Shigeru Ishiba's campaign the previous year, said he would vote for Hayashi. Meanwhile, Tokyo Governor Yuriko Koike praised Koizumi, seen by the Sankei Shimbun as an effective endorsement of Koizumi's campaign. On 30 September, former foreign minister Yuko Kamikawa declared her support for Koizumi. Meanwhile, Takaichi continued to top polls of registered LDP members.

=== Leadup to election day ===
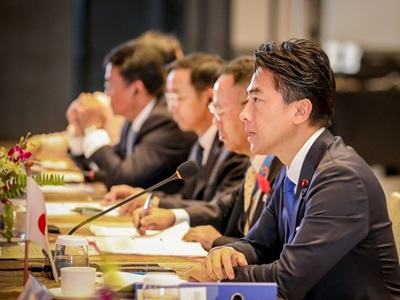
Koizumi speaking at the ASEAN+3 Agriculture and Forestry Ministers' Meeting in the Philippines on 2 October 2025. The Koizumi campaign was subject to allegations of improper conduct.

As September came to a close, Koizumi and Hayashi continued to attract the most support from lawmakers, leaving Takaichi in a distant third. A policy debate hosted by the LDP was held between all five candidates on 30 September. Hayashi said he would focus on reforming the Japanese bureaucracy, and possibly introducing a universal credit scheme. Kobayashi meanwhile highlighted security issues and concerns about spying by other nations. That same day, Takaichi expressed her openness for policy talks amongst the country's right-wing parties such as with the Conservative Party and Sanseitō. The Japan Times noted after the LDP debate that Koizumi was "toning down" his reformist agenda having previously campaigned as a reformist candidate within the LDP.

Also on 30 September, another scandal hit the Koizumi campaign, again being broken by the Shūkan Bunshun. The tabloid alleged 826 registered party members from his home prefecture of Kanagawa were unfairly expelled from the party in June. All the lawmakers were invited to a party held by former lower house member Norihiro Nakayama; Nakayama supported Takaichi in her presidential campaigns and claimed most of the 826 invitees did too. Koizumi denied any involvement, and argued it would not make sense for him to start preparing for the presidential election before the party's 2025 Upper House election defeat in July, which ultimately triggered Ishiba's resignation. From 1 October to 2 October, Koizumi traveled to the Philippines in his capacity as Agriculture Minister to attend a ASEAN+3 agricultural ministerial summit. Before leaving, he told the Sankei Shimbun that he would likely support the maintenance of the male-line of succession for the Emperor and Imperial Family, indicating further moderation on social issues.

On 2 October, street speeches were organized in Osaka. By then, it was becoming clear that no candidate would reach a majority in the first round of voting; Hayashi, Koizumi, and Takaichi continued to lead in various polls. Over 60 Diet members had yet to publicly declare their support to a candidate. The day before, Hayashi and Takaichi were interviewed by the Hudson Institute, and were asked about foreign policy matters; both said they would seek peace in the Taiwan Strait and a bolstering of the US-Japan alliance. As election day approached, it was becoming increasingly likely the runoff would be between Koizumi and Takaichi.

=== Results announced and runoff triggered: Takaichi becomes President ===
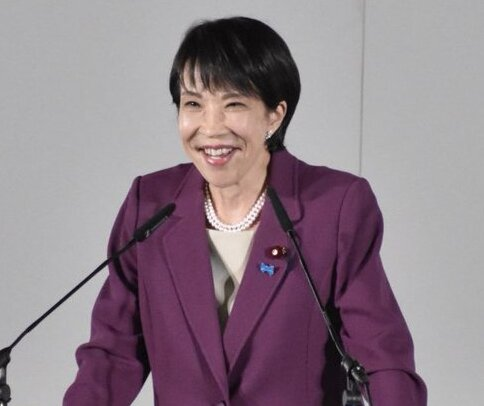
On 4 October, Sanae Takaichi was elected as the party's first female president, defeating Shinjirō Koizumi in a run-off vote.

On 3 October, the day of the deadline for LDP members to vote arrived. The following day, the counting of votes for members of parliament and party members at party headquarters began. The results were announced in the afternoon.

Sanae Takaichi came in first place during the first round of voting with 183 (31.07%) of the vote. Shinjirō Koizumi came in second with 164 (27.84%) of the vote, meaning that both Koizumi and Takaichi advanced to the run-off to elect the party leader. This meant that Japan was poised to either elected the country's first female prime minister in Takaichi or the country's youngest prime minister in modern Japan history in Koizumi. Yoshimasa Hayashi came in third place with 134 (22.75%) of the vote, nearly becoming competitive for second place alongside Koizumi, but was ultimately eliminated from the election. Takayuki Kobayashi and Toshimitsu Motegi came in fourth and fifth place respectively garnering 59 (10.02%) and 49 (8.32%) of the vote.

In the runoff, Takaichi garnered 185 votes (54.25%) of the vote against Koizumi's 156 votes (45.75%), resulting in the election of the LDP's first woman president and most likely Japan's first woman prime minister. Mainichi wrote that faction boss Taro Aso played an outsized role in Takaichi's victory. Aso reportedly had “history” with Makoto Koga, Hayashi's mentor and a key coordinator for his campaign.

== Schedule ==
On 4 September 2025, it was reported that 4 October could be a possible date for a presidential election. TBS News speculated that campaigning would begin on 22 September. Both dates were formally confirmed by the LDP General Council on 9 September. In the same announcement, party members were asked to vote by 3 October, with results being finalized on 4 October. On 17 September, the official election schedule was published by the LDP.

=== Timetable ===
Date	Event
7 September	Incumbent LDP president Shigeru Ishiba announces he will resign as party leader, seeking to take responsibility for the LDP losing its majority in the lower house elections held the previous year, and upper house elections held earlier that July.
8 September	Former LDP secretary-general Toshimitsu Motegi tells reporters he will run for party president, making him the first candidate to declare; he finished sixth in the previous race. It is reported that Yoshimasa Hayashi, the Chief Cabinet Secretary, plans to run as well, after he had consulted with colleagues earlier that morning. Later that day, it was reported former Economic Security Minister Sanae Takaichi would seek the presidency.
9 September	The LDP General Council confirms that official campaigning will begin on 22 September, with the election date being set for 4 October.
11 September	Representative Takayuki Kobayashi announces his intention to run for party president in his second leadership bid, having previously finished in fifth place in 2024.
13 September	Agriculture Minister Shinjiro Koizumi, who came in third place in the previous leadership election, tells supporters he plans to run in the election.
15 September	Finance Minister Katsunobu Katō announces he will not run in the election and endorses Koizumi for president, becoming his campaign manager.
16 September	Chief Cabinet Secretary Yoshimasa Hayashi announces his intention to run for party president in his second leadership bid, having previously finished in fourth place in 2024. Kobayashi holds a press conferences officially declaring his candidacy. Koizumi confirms his plans to run.
17 September	The official election schedule is published by the LDP.
18 September	Yoshimasa Hayashi officially announces his campaign at a press conference. Takaichi confirms she will run. Former Digital Minister Taro Kono also announces that he will not run in the election and endorsed Koizumi's candidacy. Former Internal Affairs and Communications Minister Seiko Noda declines to run in the election and endorsed Koizumi's candidacy.
19 September	Former Economic Securities Minister Sanae Takaichi officially announces her candidacy for LDP president. It is her third leadership election, having finished in second place last time.
20 September	Agriculture Minister Shinjirō Koizumi announces his intention to run for party president in his third leadership bid, having previously finished in third place in 2024. Former foreign minister Yōko Kamikawa declines to run in the election, formally finalizing the election as a five-candidate race.
22 September	Opening speeches by all five candidates as official campaign period begins at party headquarters.
23 September	A joint press conference and debate was held between all five candidates at party headquarters.
24 September	A debate was held between all five candidates, hosted by the Japan National Press Club at the Japan Press Center in Tokyo. Street speeches were organized in Tokyo.
26 September	Street speeches were organized in Aichi.
30 September	A policy debate was held between all five candidates, hosted by the LDP.
2 October	Street speeches were organized in Osaka.
3 October	Party member voting deadline.
4 October	Counting of votes for members of parliament and party members at party headquarters. In a run-off vote, Takaichi is elected the party's first female president, defeating Koizumi.
10 October	Komeito splits from the LDP-led coalition after disagreements with Takaichi's policies and the party's response to the slush fund scandal.
15 October	As negotiations between parties for the confirmation vote of the next prime minister continue, the original date for the Diet's reconvening is postponed to 20 October, than again to 21 October. That same day, Sanae Takaichi met with Leader of Nippon Ishin no Kai, Osaka Governor Hirofumi Yoshimura, to discuss a possible coalition with the LDP.
17 October	The Diet officially voted to set 21 October as the session confirmation date.
19 October	The LDP and the Japan Innovation Party agree to form a coalition, two days before the Diet session to confirm a new prime minister.
21 October	Extraordinary session of the National Diet was convened, Takaichi was confirmed as the prime minister-designate after gaining 237 votes, majority in the lower house and she became the country's first female prime minister following the appointment by Emperor Naruhito at the Tokyo Imperial Palace. Originally, the session was scheduled for 15 October, but was postponed to 21 October.

== Candidates ==
=== Declared ===
Candidate(s)	Date of birth	Current position	Party faction	Electoral district	Reference(s)
Yoshimasa Hayashi	19 January 1961 (age 64)	Chief Cabinet Secretary (since 2023); Member of the House of Representatives (since 2021) Previous offices held: Minister for Foreign Affairs (2021–2023); Minister of Education, Culture, Sports, Science and Technology (2017–2018); Minister of Agriculture, Forestry and Fisheries (2012–2014; 2015); Minister of State for Economic and Fiscal Policy (2009); Minister of Defense (2008); Member of the House of Councillors (1995–2021)	None (former Kōchikai)	Yamaguchi 3rd	
Takayuki Kobayashi	29 November 1974 (age 50)	Member of the House of Representatives (since 2012) Previous offices held: Minister of State for Economic Security (2021–2022)	None (former Shisuikai)	Chiba 2nd	
Shinjirō Koizumi	14 April 1981 (age 44)	Minister of Agriculture, Forestry and Fisheries (since 2025); Member of the House of Representatives (since 2009) Previous offices held: Minister of the Environment (2019–2021)	None	Kanagawa 11th district	
Sanae Takaichi	7 March 1961 (age 64)	Member of the House of Representatives (1993–2003; since 2005) Previous offices held: Minister of State for Economic Security (2022–2024); Minister for Internal Affairs and Communications (2014–2017; 2019–2020)	None (former Seiwa Seisaku Kenkyūkai)	Nara 2nd district	
Toshimitsu Motegi	7 October 1955 (age 69)	Member of the House of Representatives (since 1993) Previous offices held: Minister of Economy, Trade and Industry (2012–2014); Minister of State for Economic and Fiscal Policy (2017–2019); Minister for Foreign Affairs (2019-2021); Secretary-General of the Liberal Democratic Party (2021–2024)	None (former Heisei Kenkyūkai)	Tochigi 5th district	

=== Declined ===
- Shigeru Ishiba, incumbent prime minister (2024–present); member of the House of Representatives (1986–present)
- Yōko Kamikawa, minister for foreign affairs (2023–2024); minister of justice (2020–2021, 2017–2018, 2014–2015); member of the House of Representatives (2000–2009, 2012–present)
- Katsunobu Katō, minister of finance (2024–present); chief cabinet secretary (2020–2021); member of the House of Representatives (2003–present) (endorsed Koizumi)
- Fumio Kishida, Prime Minister (2021–2024); member of the House of Representatives (1993–present)
- Taro Kono, minister for digital transformation (2022–2024); minister for foreign affairs (2017–2019); member of the House of Representatives (1996–present) (endorsed Koizumi)
- Seiko Noda, minister-in-charge of measures against declining birthrate (2021–2022); minister for internal affairs and communications (2017–2018); minister of posts and telecommunications (1998–1999); Member of the House of Representatives (1993–present) (endorsed Koizumi)

== Supporters ==
=== Recommenders ===
Party regulations require candidates to have the written support at least 20 Diet members, known as recommenders, to run. The following names were made public by the LDP's Presidential Election Committee on 22 September, the day campaigning officially began.

Yoshimasa Hayashi

Leader of recommenders

- Norihisa Tamura, Minister of Health, Labour and Welfare (2012–2014, 2020–2021); Member of the House of Representatives for Mie 1st (1996–present) (former Kōchikai)

Campaign Manager

- Yoshihiko Isozaki, Deputy Chief Cabinet Secretary (2021–2023); Member of the House of Councillors from Kagawa (2010–present) (former Kōchikai)

Recommenders

- Kiyoshi Ejima, Mayor of Shimonoseki (1995–2009); Parliamentary Vice-Minister for Land, Infrastructure, Transport and Tourism (2015–2016); State Minister of Economy, Trade and Industry (2020–2021); Member of the House of Councillors from Yamaguchi (2013–present) (former Seiwakai)
- Taku Etō, Minister of Agriculture, Forestry and Fisheries (2019–2020, 2024–2025); Member of the House of Representatives for Miyazaki 2nd (2003–present) (no faction)
- Shigeyuki Goto, Minister of Health, Labour and Welfare (2021–2022); Minister of State for Economic Planning and Fiscal Policy (2022–2023); Member of the House of Representatives for Nagano 4th district (2000–2009, 2012–present) (no faction)
- Shinya Fujiki, Member of the House of Councillors from National PR block (2016–present) (former Kōchikai)
- Toshiharu Furukawa, Chairperson of the LDP Policy Board in the House of Councillors (2024–present), Member of the House of Councillors from Saitama (2007–present) (former Seiwakai)
- Ken Hirose, Member of the House of Representatives for Ōita 2nd district (2024–present) (no faction)
- Noriko Horiuchi, Minister for the Tokyo Olympic and Paralympic Games (2021–2022); Member of the House of Representatives for Yamanashi 2nd (2012–present) (former Kōchikai)
- Rintaro Ishibashi, Member of the Hiroshima Prefectural Assembly (2015–2021); Parliamentary Vice-Minister for Land, Infrastructure, Transport and Tourism (2023–2024); Member of the House of Representatives for Chugoku PR block (2021–present) (former Kōchikai)
- Tadahiko Ito, Member of the Aichi Prefectural Assembly (1999–2005); Minister for Reconstruction (2024–present); Member of the House of Representatives for Tōkai PR block (2005–2009, 2012–present) (former Shisuikai)
- Yozo Kaneko, Parliamentary Secretary for Defense (2024-present); Member of the House of Representatives for Nagasaki 3rd (2023–present) (former Kōchikai)
- Kazuhiro Kobayashi, Member of the Niigata Prefectural Assembly (2007–2022); Parliamentary Secretary for Defense (2024-present); Member of the House of Councillors from Niigata (2022–present) (former Kōchikai)
- Wataru Kurihara, Member of the House of Representatives for Fukuoka 5th (2024–present) (no faction)
- Gen Nakatani, Minister of Defense (2014–2016, 2024–present); Member of the House of Representatives for Kōchi 1st (1990–present) (no faction)
- Shoji Nishida, Member of the Ishikawa Prefectural Assembly (2007–2017); Parliamentary Vice-Minister for Land, Infrastructure, Transport and Tourism (2022–2023); Member of the House of Representatives for Hokuriku-Shin'etsu PR block (2017–present) (former Kōchikai)
- Hidenori Nishida, Member of the House of Councillors from Hiroshima (2025–present) (no faction)
- Mitsuru Sakurai, State Minister of Finance (2010–2011); State Minister of Health, Labour and Welfare (2012); Member of the House of Councillors from Miyagi (1998–present) (no faction)
- Tomoaki Shimada, Mayor of Kawachinagano (2016–2024); Member of the House of Representatives for Kinki PR block (2024–present) (no faction)
- Shōji Maitachi, Parliamentary Secretary for Agriculture, Forestry and Fisheries (2023–2024); Member of the House of Councillors from National PR block (2013–present) (no faction)
- Akira Yoshii, Member of the Kyoto Prefectural Assembly (2007–2022); Member of the House of Councillors from Kyoto (2022–present) (former Kōchikai)
Takayuki Kobayashi

Leader of recommenders

- Yasukazu Hamada, Chairperson of the LDP Diet Affairs Committee (2012, 2023–2024); Minister of Defense (2008–2009, 2022–2023); Member of the House of Representatives for Chiba 12th (1993–present) (no faction)

Campaign Manager

- Yukinori Nemoto, Parliamentary Vice-Minister for Land, Infrastructure, Transport and Tourism (2016–2017); Member of the House of Representatives for Aichi 15th (2012–present) (former Seiwakai)

Recommenders

- Taro Honda, Parliamentary Vice-Minister for Foreign Affairs (2021–2022); State Minister of Defense (2024–present); Member of the House of Representatives for Kyoto 5th (2017–present) (no faction)
- Kuniko Inoguchi, Minister of State for Policies Related to Children, Measures for Declining Birthrate, Youth Empowerment, and Gender Equality (2005-2006); Member of the House of Representatives for Tokyo PR block (2005-2009); Member of the House of Councillors from Chiba (2010–present) (Shikōkai)
- Takaaki Katsumata, Parliamentary Vice-Minister for the Environment (2018–2019); State Minister of Agriculture, Forestry and Fisheries (2022-2023); Member of the House of Representatives for Tōkai PR block (2012–present) (former Shisuikai)
- Yasushi Katsume, Parliamentary Vice-Minister for the Environment (2024–present); Member of the House of Representatives for Kyoto 1st (2021–present) (no faction)
- Masaaki Koike, Member of the Chiba Prefectural Assembly (2011–2024); Member of the House of Representatives for Chiba 10th (2024–present) (no faction)
- Yohei Matsumoto, Parliamentary Vice-Minister of Cabinet Office (2014–2015); State Minister of Cabinet Office (2016-2017); State Minister of Economy, Trade and Industry (2019-2020); Member of the House of Representatives for Tokyo PR block (2005-2009, 2012–present) (former Shisuikai)
- Jun Mukōyama, Member of the House of Representatives for Hokkaido PR block (2024–present) (Shikōkai)
- Keitaro Ohno, Parliamentary Secretary for Defense (2017–2018); State Minister of Cabinet Office (2021-2022); Member of the House of Representatives for Kagawa 3rd (2012–present) (no faction)
- Hiroaki Saito, Parliamentary Vice-Minister for Internal Affairs and Communications (2019–2020); State Minister of Finance (2024–present); Member of the House of Representatives for Hokuriku-Shin'etsu PR block (2012–present) (Shikōkai)
- Masato Shimizu, Member of the Gunma Prefectural Assembly (2011–2019); Member of the House of Councillors from Gunma (2019–present) (former Shisuikai)
- Akihisa Shiozaki, Parliamentary Secretary for Health, Labour and Welfare (2023-2024); Member of the House of Representatives for Ehime 1st (2021–present) (former Seiwakai)
- Hiroaki Tabata, Member of the Toyama City Council (2003–2011); Member of the Toyama Prefectural Assembly (2011–2012); Parliamentary Secretary for Health, Labour and Welfare (2017-2018); State Minister for Internal Affairs and Communications (2021-2022); Member of the House of Representatives for Toyama 1st (2012–present) (former Seiwakai)
- Arata Takebe, Parliamentary Vice-Minister for the Environment (2017-2018); State Minister of Agriculture, Forestry and Fisheries (2021-2022); Member of the House of Representatives for Hokkaido 12th (2012–present) (former Shisuikai)
- Jun Tsushima, Parliamentary Vice-Minister for Land, Infrastructure, Transport and Tourism (2015-2016); State Minister of Justice (2021-2022); Member of the House of Representatives for Aomori 1st (2012–present) (former Heiseiken)
- Shoichi Usui, Member of the Chiba Prefectural Assembly (2003–2009, 2011-2022); Member of the House of Councillors from Chiba (2022–present) (former Heiseiken)
- Shinji Wakayama, Member of the House of Representatives for Tōkai PR block (2024–present) (no faction)
- Takeyuki Watanabe, Member of the Gifu Prefectural Assembly (1995–1998, 1999-2010); State Minister of Land, Infrastructure, Transport and Tourism (2021-2022); Member of the House of Councillors from Gifu (2010–present) (former Heiseiken)
- Kenji Yamada, Parliamentary Vice-Minister for Foreign Affairs (2018-2019); State Minister for Foreign Affairs (2022-2023); Member of the House of Representatives for Hyogo 7th (2012–present) (Shikōkai)
- Daichi Yamamoto, Member of the Wakayama City Council (2022-2024); Member of the House of Representatives for Wakayama 1st (2024–present) (no faction)
Shinjiro Koizumi

Leader of recommenders

- Katsunobu Katō, Chief Cabinet Secretary (2020-2021); Minister of Health, Labour and Welfare (2017-2018, 2019-2020, 2022-2023); Minister of Finance (2024–present); Member of the House of Representatives for Okayama 5th (2003–present) (former Heiseiken)

Campaign Manager

- Ryosei Tanaka, Parliamentary Vice-Minister for Economy, Trade and Industry (2013-2014); State Minister of Land, Infrastructure, Transport and Tourism (2016-2017); State Minister of Cabinet Office (2018-2019); Member of the House of Representatives for Saitama 15th (2005-2009, 2012-present) (Ganesha no Kai)

Recommenders

- Masashi Adachi, Parliamentary Vice-Minister for Land, Infrastructure, Transport and Tourism (2018–2019); Special Advisor to the Prime Minister of Japan (2020-2021); State Minister for Internal Affairs and Communications (2024-present); Member of the House of Councilors from National PR block (2014-present) (no faction)
- Toshiaki Endo, Member of the Yamagata Prefectural Assembly (1983-1990); Minister for the Tokyo Olympic and Paralympic Games (2015-2016); Head of the LDP Election Strategy Headquarters (2021-2022); Chairperson of the LDP General Council (2022-2023); Member of the House of Representatives for Yamagata 1st (1993-2000, 2003–present) (no faction)
- Mamoru Fukuyama, Member of the Tokushima Prefectural Assembly (1991-2012); Member of the House of Representatives (2012-2021); Parliamentary Vice-Minister for the Environment (2014-2015); Member of the House of Councilors from National PR block (2025-present) (no faction)
- Yoshitaka Itō, Member of the Hokkaido Legislative Assembly (1995–2002); Mayor of Kushiro (2002-2009); Parliamentary Secretary for Finance (2012-2013); State Minister of Agriculture, Forestry and Fisheries (2015-2016); Minister in charge of International Exposition (2024-present); Member of the House of Representatives for Hokkaido PR block (2009-present) (former Shisuikai)
- Daisuke Kajihara, Member of the Kōchi Prefectural Assembly (2007-2022); Member of the House of Councillors from National PR block (2022–present) (former Shisuikai)
- Junichi Kanda, Parliamentary Secretary for Justice (2024-present); Member of the House of Representatives for Aomori 2nd (2021-present) (former Kōchikai)
- Ryōsuke Kōzuki, Parliamentary Secretary for Agriculture, Forestry and Fisheries (2017-2018); State Minister of Economy, Trade and Industry (2023-2024); Member of the House of Councillors from Ibaraki (2013-present) (former Heiseiken)
- Karen Makishima, Parliamentary Vice-Minister of Cabinet Office (2015-2016); Minister for Digital Transformation (2021-2022); Member of the House of Representatives for Kanagawa 17th (2012-present) (Shikōkai)
- Junko Mihara, Minister of State for Special Missions (2024-present); Member of the House of Councillors from Kanagawa (2010–present) (no faction)
- Takuma Miyaji, Parliamentary Vice-Minister for Internal Affairs and Communications (2020-2021); Parliamentary Vice-Minister of Cabinet Office (2021-2022); Member of the House of Representatives for Kyushu PR block (2014–present) (former Kinmirai Seiji Kenkyūkai)
- Kenji Nakanishi, State Minister of Finance (2020-2021); Member of the House of Councillors from Kanagawa (2010-2021); Member of the House of Representatives for Kanagawa 3rd (2021-present) (Shikōkai)
- Taku Nemoto, Member of the House of Representatives for Tohoku PR block (2024–present) (no faction)
- Kosaburo Nishime, Member of the Okinawa Prefectural Assembly (1988–2003); Parliamentary Vice-Minister for Land, Infrastructure, Transport and Tourism (2008-2009); State Minister of Economy, Trade and Industry (2017-2018); Minister for Reconstruction (2021–2022); Member of the House of Representatives for Okinawa 4th (2003-2009, 2012–present) (former Heiseiken)
- Seiko Noda, Member of the Gifu Prefectural Assembly (1987–1990); Minister of Posts and Telecommunications (1998-1999); Minister of State for Special Missions (2008-2009); Minister for Internal Affairs and Communications (2017–2018); Member of the House of Representatives for Gifu 1st (1993–present) (no faction)
- Masaki Ogushi, Parliamentary Vice-Minister for Economy, Trade and Industry (2017-2018); State Minister for Digital Transformation (2022-2023); Member of the House of Representatives for Kinki PR block (2012–present) (no faction)
- Aiko Shimajiri, Member of the Naha City Council (2004–2007); Parliamentary Vice-Minister for Reconstruction(2012-2013); State Minister of Economy, Trade and Industry (2017-2018); Minister of State for Special Missions (2015–2016); Member of the House of Councillors from Okinawa (2007-2016); Member of the House of Representatives for Okinawa 3rd (2021–present) (former Heiseiken)
- Yoshinori Tadokoro, Member of the Ibaraki Prefectural Assembly (1998–2012); Parliamentary Secretary for Justice (2015-2016); State Minister of Justice (2020-2021); Member of the House of Representatives for Northern Kanto PR block (2012–present) (no faction)
- Kazunori Tanaka, Member of the Kanagawa Prefectural Assembly (1991–1995); Parliamentary Vice-Minister for Land, Infrastructure, Transport and Tourism (2001-2002); Parliamentary Secretary for Finance (2002-2003); Parliamentary Vice-Minister for Foreign Affairs (2003-2004); State Minister of Finance (2006-2007); State Minister of Environment (2012-2013); Minister for Reconstruction (2019–2020); Member of the House of Representatives for Kanagawa 10th (1996–present) (Shikōkai)
- Kiyoto Tsuji, Parliamentary Vice-Minister for Foreign Affairs (2018-2019); State Minister for Foreign Affairs (2023–2024); Member of the House of Representatives for Tokyo 2nd (2012–present) (former Kōchikai)
Toshimitsu Motegi

Leader of recommenders

- Yoshitaka Shindō, Member of the Kawaguchi City Council (1991-1996); Parliamentary Vice-Minister for Internal Affairs and Communications (2001-2002); Parliamentary Vice-Minister for Foreign Affairs (2002–2003); State Minister of Economy, Trade and Industry (2007-2008); Minister for Internal Affairs and Communications (2012-2014); Minister of State for Special Missions (2023-2024); Member of the House of Representatives for Saitama 2nd (1996-2003, 2005–present) (former Heiseiken)

Campaign Manager

- Hiroshi Kajiyama, Parliamentary Vice-Minister for Land, Infrastructure, Transport and Tourism (2006-2007); State Minister of Land, Infrastructure, Transport and Tourism (2012–2013); Minister for Administrative Reform (2017-2018); Minister of Economy, Trade and Industry (2019-2021); Member of the House of Representatives for Ibaraki 4th (2000–present) (no faction)

Recommenders

- Kuniyoshi Azuma, Member of the Asahikawa City Council (1995-1999); Member of the Hokkaido Legislative Assembly (1999–2002, 2007-2014, 2015-2021); Parliamentary Secretary for Finance (2024-present); Member of the House of Representatives for Hokkaido 6th (2021-present) (former Heiseiken)
- Akinori Eto, Parliamentary Vice-Minister of Cabinet Office (2004-2005); State Minister of Defense (2007-2008); Minister of Defense (2014); Member of the House of Representatives for Tohoku PR block (1996-2000, 2003-present) (Shikōkai)
- Hajime Funada, Director-General of the Economic Planning Agency (1992-1993); Member of the House of Representatives for Tochigi 1st (1979-2000, 2003-2009, 2012–present) (former Heiseiken)
- Yasushi Furukawa, Governor of Saga Prefecture (2003-2014); Parliamentary Vice-Minister for Internal Affairs and Communications (2020-2021); Parliamentary Vice-Minister for Land, Infrastructure, Transport and Tourism (2022-2023); Member of the House of Representatives for Kyushu PR block (2014–present) (former Heiseiken)
- Hiroshi Hiraguchi, Parliamentary Secretary for Justice (2013-2014); State Minister of Environment (2015-2016); State Minister of Justice (2018-2019); Member of the House of Representatives for Hiroshima 2nd (2005-2009, 2012-present) (former Heiseiken)
- Akiyoshi Kato, Member of the Ibaraki Prefectural Assembly (2010-2022); Parliamentary Vice-Minister for Economy, Trade and Industry (2024-present); Member of the House of Councillors from Ibaraki (2022–present) (former Heiseiken)
- Minoru Kihara, Parliamentary Secretary for Defense (2013-2014); State Minister of Finance (2016-2018); Special Advisor to the Prime Minister of Japan (2019-2021); Minister of Defense (2023-2024); Member of the House of Representatives for Kumamoto 1st (2005-2009, 2012-present) (former Heiseiken)
- Masahisa Miyazaki, Parliamentary Secretary for Justice (2019-2020); State Minister of Health, Labour and Welfare (2023-2024); Member of the House of Representatives for Kyushu PR block (2012-2017, 2018-present) (former Heiseiken)
- Chisato Morishita, Member of the House of Representatives for Tohoku PR block (2024-present) (no faction)
- Keiko Nagaoka, Parliamentary Secretary for Agriculture, Forestry and Fisheries (2006–2007); State Minister of Health, Labour and Welfare (2014-2015); State Minister of Education, Culture, Sports, Science and Technology (2018-2019); Minister of Education, Culture, Sports, Science and Technology (2022-2023); Member of the House of Representatives for Northern Kanto PR block (2005-present) (Shikōkai)
- Shinichi Nakatani, Parliamentary Vice-Minister for Foreign Affairs (2019–2020); State Minister of Economy, Trade and Industry (2022-2023); Member of the House of Representatives for Southern Kanto PR block (2012-present) (former Heiseiken)
- Yohei Onishi, Member of the House of Representatives for Tokyo 16th (2024-present) (no faction)
- Hayato Suzuki, Parliamentary Vice-Minister for Foreign Affairs (2020-2021); Member of the House of Representatives for Tokyo 10th (2014-present) (former Heiseiken)
- Takako Suzuki, Parliamentary Secretary for Defense (2018-2019); State Minister for Foreign Affairs (2021-2022); Member of the House of Representatives for Hokkaido 7th (2013-present) (former Heiseiken)
- Katsunori Takahashi, Member of the Tochigi Prefectural Assembly (1996-1998); Mayor of Takanezawa (1998-2013); Parliamentary Vice-Minister for Land, Infrastructure, Transport and Tourism (2017-2018); State Minister of Land, Infrastructure, Transport and Tourism (2024-present); Member of the House of Councillors from Tochigi (2013–present) (Shikōkai)
- Yasuhiro Takami, Member of the Shimane Prefectural Assembly (2015-2021); Parliamentary Secretary for Justice (2022-2023); Senior Adviser to the Minister of Defense (2024); Parliamentary Vice-Minister for Land, Infrastructure, Transport and Tourism (2024-present); Member of the House of Representatives for Shimane 2nd (2021-present) (former Heiseiken)
- Eishun Ueda, Member of the Toyama Prefectural Assembly (1999-2021); Member of the House of Representatives for Toyama 2nd (2021-present) (former Heiseiken)
- Michiko Ueno, Member of the Tochigi Prefectural Assembly (2003-2010); Parliamentary Vice-Minister for Education, Culture, Sports, Science and Technology (2013-2014); State Minister of Education, Culture, Sports, Science and Technology (2019-2020); Special Advisor to the Prime Minister of Japan (2023); Member of the House of Councillors from Tochigi (2010–present) (former Seiwakai)
Sanae Takaichi

Leader of recommenders

- Keiji Furuya, Chairperson of the LDP Public Relations Headquarters (2008-2009); Chairperson of the National Public Safety Commission (2012-2014); Head of the LDP Election Strategy Headquarters (2016-2017); Member of the House of Representatives for Gifu 5th (1990-present) (no faction)

Campaign Manager

- Hitoshi Kikawada, Parliamentary Vice-Minister for Foreign Affairs (2015-2016); State Minister of Cabinet Office (2021-2022); Member of the House of Representatives for Saitama 3rd (2012-present) (no faction)

Recommenders

- Takao Ando, Parliamentary Secretary for Health, Labour and Welfare (2024-present); Member of the House of Representatives for Tokyo PR block (2017-2021, 2024-present) (former Seiwakai)
- Haruko Arimura, Parliamentary Vice-Minister for Education, Culture, Sports, Science and Technology (2005-2006); Minister of State for Special Missions (2014-2015); Chairperson of the LDP Policy Board in the House of Councillors (2019); Chairperson of the LDP Public Relations Headquarters (2021); Member of the House of Councilors from National PR block (2001-present) (Shikōkai)
- Shojiro Hiranuma, Parliamentary Vice-Minister for Reconstruction (2023-2024); Member of the House of Representatives for Chugoku PR block (2021-present) (former Shisuikai)
- Akiko Ikuina, Parliamentary Vice-Minister for Foreign Affairs (2024-present); Member of the House of Councillors from Tokyo (2022–present) (former Seiwakai)
- Soichiro Imaeda, Parliamentary Secretary for Finance (2017-2018); State Minister of Education, Culture, Sports, Science and Technology (2023-2024); Member of the House of Representatives for Aichi 14th (2012-present) (Shikōkai)
- Satsuki Katayama, Parliamentary Vice-Minister for Economy, Trade and Industry (2005-2006); Member of the House of Representatives for Shizuoka 7th (2005-2009); Parliamentary Vice-Minister for Internal Affairs and Communications (2012-2013); Minister of State for Special Missions (2018-2019); Member of the House of Councilors from National PR block (2010-present) (former Seiwakai)
- Shigeki Kobayashi, Member of the Nara Prefectural Assembly (2007-2012); Parliamentary Vice-Minister for Land, Infrastructure, Transport and Tourism (2020-2021); State Minister of Environment (2022-2023); Member of the House of Representatives for Kinki PR block (2012-2014, 2017-present) (former Shisuikai)
- Shōzō Kudō, Member of the Nagoya City Council (2003-2011); Parliamentary Vice-Minister for Land, Infrastructure, Transport and Tourism (2018-2019); State Minister of Cabinet Office (2023-2024); Member of the House of Representatives for Tōkai PR block (2012-present) (Shikōkai)
- Hisashi Matsumoto, Parliamentary Secretary for Defense (2023-2024); Parliamentary Vice-Minister for Foreign Affairs (2024-present); Member of the House of Representatives for Chiba 13th (2021-present) (former Seiwakai)
- Midori Matsushima, Parliamentary Vice-Minister for Foreign Affairs (2006-2007); State Minister of Land, Infrastructure, Transport and Tourism (2007-2008); State Minister of Economy, Trade and Industry (2013-2014); Minister of Justice (2014); Member of the House of Representatives for Tokyo 14th (2000-2009, 2012-present) (former Seiwakai)
- Hiroyuki Nakamura, Member of the Hokkaido Legislative Assembly (2003-2012); Parliamentary Vice-Minister for Education, Culture, Sports, Science and Technology (2018-2019); State Minister of Agriculture, Forestry and Fisheries (2021-2022); Member of the House of Representatives for Hokkaido PR block (2012-present) (Shikōkai)
- Hirofumi Nakasone, Minister of Education, Science, Sports and Culture (1999-2000); Special Advisor to the Prime Minister of Japan (2000-2001); Minister for Foreign Affairs (2008-2009); Member of the House of Councilors from Gunma (1986-present) (former Shisuikai)
- Hirobumi Niki, State Minister of Health, Labour and Welfare (2024-present); Member of the House of Representatives for Tokushima 1st (2009-2012, 2021-present) (Shikōkai)
- Kimi Onoda, Member of the Kita City Council (2011-2015); Parliamentary Secretary for Justice (2020-2021); Parliamentary Secretary for Defense (2022-2023); Member of the House of Councilors from Okayama (2016-present) (former Heiseiken)
- Masanao Ozaki, Governor of Kōchi Prefecture (2007-2019); Parliamentary Vice-Minister of Digital Agency (2022-2023); Parliamentary Vice-Minister for Reconstruction (2024); Parliamentary Vice-Minister for Land, Infrastructure, Transport and Tourism (2024); Member of the House of Representatives for Kōchi 2nd (2021-present) (former Shisuikai)
- Kei Takagi, Member of the Kita City Council (1991-2001); Member of the Tokyo Metropolitan Assembly (2005-2017); Parliamentary Vice-Minister for Foreign Affairs (2022-2023); Member of the House of Representatives for Tokyo 12th (2017-present) (former Seiwakai)
- Yohei Wakabayashi, Mayor of Gotemba (2009-2021); Member of the House of Councilors from Shizuoka (2022-present) (former Shisuikai)
- Tsuyoshi Yamaguchi, State Minister of Cabinet Office (2011); State Minister for Foreign Affairs (2011-2012); Minister of the Environment (2021-2022); Member of the House of Representatives for Hyogo 12th (2000-2003, 2005-present) (Shikōkai)

Number of supporters by former factions

Candidates	Sanae Takaichi	Shinjiro Koizumi	Yoshimasa Hayashi	Takayuki Kobayashi	Toshimitsu Motegi
Heisei Kenkyūkai	1	4	0	3	13
Kinmirai Seiji Kenkyūkai	0	1	0	0	0
Kōchikai	0	2	8	0	0
Seiwa Seisaku Kenkyūkai	6	0	2	2	1
Shikōkai	6	3	0	4	3
Shisuikai	5	2	1	4	0
No faction	2	8	9	7	3

=== Endorsements ===
The following individuals publicly endorsed candidates before the official election period began on 22 September.

Endorsements of Yoshimasa Hayashi

Cabinet-level officials

- Gen Nakatani (Minister of Defense, 2024–present; Member of the House of Representatives, 1990–present)
- Tadahiko Ito, Minister of Reconstruction, 2024–present; Member of the House of Representatives (2012–present)

Members of the National Diet

- Masaji Matsuyama (Member of the House of Councillors, 2001–present)
Endorsements of Shinjiro Koizumi

Cabinet-level officials

- Katsunobu Katō (Minister of Finance, 2024–present); Chief Cabinet Secretary, 2020–2021; Member of the House of Representatives, 2003–present)
- Taro Kono, Minister for Digital Transformation (2022–2024); Minister for Foreign Affairs (2017–2019); Member of the House of Representatives (1996–present)
- Seiko Noda, Minister-in-charge of Measures against Declining Birthrate (2021–2022); Minister for Internal Affairs and Communications (2017–2018); Minister of Posts and Telecommunications (1998–1999); Member of the House of Representatives (1993–present)
- Keisuke Suzuki, Minister of Justice (2024–present); Member of the House of Representatives (2012–present)

Members of the National Diet

- Toshiaki Endo (Member of the House of Councillors, 2003–present)

Prefectural governors

- Ichita Yamamoto (Governor of Gunma Prefecture, 2019–present; Member of the House of Councillors, 1995–2019)
Endorsements of Sanae Takaichi

Cabinet-level officials

- Hirofumi Nakasone (Minister of Foreign Affairs, 2008–2009; Minister of Education and Director of the Science and Technology Agency, 1999–2000; Member of the House of Councillors, 1986–present)
- Midori Matsushima (Minister of Justice, 2014; Member of the House of Representatives, 2012–present)
- Haruko Arimura (Minister of State for Government Revitalization, 2014–2015; Minister of State for Consumer Affairs and Food Safety, 2014; Member of the House of Councillors, 2011–present)

Members of the National Diet

- Kimi Onoda (Member of the House of Councillors, 2022–present)
- Akiko Ikuina (Member of the House of Councillors, 2016–present)
- Satsuki Katayama (Member of the House of Councillors, 2010–present; Member of the House of Representatives, 2005–2009)
- Shoji Nishida (Member of the House of Councillors, 2007–present)
- Kei Satō (Member of the House of Councillors, 2016–present)
- Hitoshi Kikawada (Member of the House of Representatives, 2012–present)
Endorsements of Toshimitsu Motegi

Prefectural governors

- Tomikazu Fukuda (Governor of Tochigi Prefecture, 2004–present)

== Debates ==
=== Official ===
Date	P Participant I Invited N Not invited A Absent E Eliminated					Host	Location	Link	Source
Date	Takaichi	Koizumi	Hayashi	Kobayashi	Motegi	Host	Location	Link	Source
23 September	P	P	P	P	P	Liberal Democratic Party	LDP Headquarters		
24 September	P	P	P	P	P	Japan National Press Club	Japan Press Center		
30 September	P	P	P	P	P	Liberal Democratic Party	LDP Headquarters		

=== Informal ===
Date	P Participant I Invited N Not invited A Absent E Eliminated					Host	Link	Source
Date	Takaichi	Koizumi	Hayashi	Kobayashi	Motegi	Host	Link	Source
22 September	P	P	P	P	P	Nippon Television		
22 September	P	P	P	P	P	TV Tokyo		
23 September	P	P	P	P	P	TBS News		
23 September	P	P	P	P	P	ANN News		
28 September	P	P	P	P	P	NHK News	-	
28 September	P	P	P	P	P	Niconico News		
2 October	P	P	P	P	P	AbemaTV		

== Opinion polls ==
=== Polling ===

(Figures in parentheses are approval ratings of Liberal Democratic Party supporters)

Fieldwork date	Polling firm	Sample size	Sanae Takaichi	Shinjirō Koizumi	Yoshimasa Hayashi	Takayuki Kobayashi	Toshimitsu Motegi	Others	NOT/ UD/NA
4 Oct	Election results	(626,555)	(40.05)	(28.59)	(20.89)	(5.15)	(5.32)	–	–
29–30 Sep	NTV/JX	(1,210)	(35)	(28)	(23)	(5)	(4)	–	(5)
27–28 Sep	ANN	1,025 (340)	31 (24)	33 (41)	14 (16)	3 (3)	5 (4)	–	14 (12)
27–28 Sep	Yomiuri	3,143 (Note: LDP supporters) (519) (Note: LDP members)	25 (28)	40 (41)	16 (13)	5 (8)	4 (4)	–	10 (6)
27–28 Sep	Kyodo News	(1,044)	(34.4)	(29.3)	(19.5)	(3.8)	(5.2)	–	(7.8)
26–28 Sep	Nikkei/TV Tokyo	915 (284)	34 (28)	25 (33)	14 (20)	4 (3)	5 (6)	–	18 (9)
23–24 Sep	NTV/JX	(1,108)	(34)	(28)	(17)	(5)	(4)	–	(12)
20–21 Sep	Sankei/FNN	1,018 (284)	28.3 (22.5)	25.7 (35.2)	11.1 (18.6)	4 (4)	3.8 (5.3)	–	27 (14.4)
20–21 Sep	Asahi	1,176 (306)	28 (24)	24 (41)	9 (10)	5 (3)	4 (8)	–	30 (Note: None of these: 25%; Don't know: 5%) (14) (Note: None of these: 11%; Don't know: 3%)
20–21 Sep	Mainichi/SSRC	1,972 (375)	25 (22)	21 (40)	10 (11)	2 (5)	3 (5)	4	34 (17)
19–20 Sep	NTV/JX	(1,010)	(28)	(32)	(15)	(7)	(5)	–	(14)
13–14 Sep	Senkyo.com/JX	995	23.4	26.7	14.1	3.8	6.5	–	25.4

=== Hypothetical polling ===
The following polls feature Shigeru Ishiba, Katsunobu Katō, Taro Kono and Yōko Kamikawa in a hypothetical snap Liberal Democratic Party presidential election, before their decisions not to run in the election.

Hypothetical polling with Shigeru Ishiba, Katsunobu Katō, Taro Kono and Yōko Kamikawa as candidates

LOESS curve of the polling for the 2024 LDP leadership election with a 7-day average.

Fieldwork date	Polling firm	Sample size	Shigeru Ishiba	Sanae Takaichi	Shinjirō Koizumi	Yoshimasa Hayashi	Takayuki Kobayashi	Toshimitsu Motegi	Yōko Kamikawa	Taro Kono	Katsunobu Katō	Others	NOT/ UD/NA
20 Sep	Former foreign minister Yōko Kamikawa declines to run in the election.												
18 Sep	Former Minister for Digital Transformation Taro Kono and former Internal Affairs and Communications Seiko Noda both decline to run in the election and endorse Koizumi's candidacy.												
15 Sep	Finance Minister Katsunobu Katō declines to run in the election and endorses Koizumi's candidacy.												
12–15 Sep	Jiji Press	1,162 (199)	–	21 (19.7)	23.8 (31.8)	5.9 (7.6)	3.1 (3.5)	5.9 (11.1)	1.4	2.8	0.9	–	35.2 (26.3)
13–14 Sep	Yomiuri/NNN	1,043 (282)	–	29 (28)	25 (33)	6 (8)	3 (5)	7 (6)	2	7 (9)	1	0	22 (Note: None of these: 14%; Don't know: 8%) (11)
11–12 Sep	Kyodo News	1,040 (245)	–	28 (15.7)	22.5 (36)	11.4 (14.9)	3.6 (2.8)	6.1 (8.6)	3.8 (2.7)	6.1 (7.3)	0.4 (0.7)	0.3	17.8 (11.3)
7 Sep	Shigeru Ishiba announces he will resign as President of the LDP.												
6–7 Sep	Kyodo News	1,045	9.9	26.7	19.4	4	3.4	4.3	4.4	8.3	1.3	0.2	18.1
6–7 Sep	JNN	1,030	8.6	19.3	19.3	2.2	0.9	0.9	1.8	4.9	0.6	29.4 (Note: Yoshihiko Noda (CDP): 3.2%; Fumitake Fujita (Ishin): 0.1%; Yuichiro Tamaki (DPFP): 5.8%; Others: 20.3%)	12.1
29–31 Aug	Nikkei/TV Tokyo	955	8	23	22	4	3	1	–	4	–	15 (Note: Fumio Kishida (LDP): 2%; Yoshihiko Noda (CDP): 4%; Yuichiro Tamaki (DPFP): 7%; Others: 2%)	20
23–24 Aug	Sankei/FNN	1,022 (227)	14.4 (29)	23 (17)	20.9 (24.9)	2.7	1.8	1.2	1.6	5.1	0.3	2.3 (Note: Fumio Kishida (LDP): 2.3%)	26.7 (29.1)
23–24 Aug	ANN	1,012	5	22	27	5	2	1	2	6	1	16	13
23–24 Aug	Mainichi/SSRC	2,046	21	14	9	2	2	–	–	–	–	12 (Note: Fumio Kishida (LDP): 2%; Yoshihiko Noda (CDP): 4%; Yuichiro Tamaki (DPFP): 6%)	40
23–24 Aug	Kyodo News	1,056	13.1	24.5	20.1	4.9	4.2	3.3	2.8	9.4	1.4	0.2	16.1
22–24 Aug	Yomiuri/NNN	991	14	24	21	2	4	1	1	6	1	1 (Note: Fumio Kishida (LDP): 1%)	23 (Note: None of these: 14%; Don't know: 9%)
16–17 Aug	Senkyo.com/JX	1,000	28.9	17.3	15.9	5.9	2.5	0.7	–	2.3	0.1	7.1	19.3
8–11 Aug	Jiji Press	1,138 (179)	11.3 (24.6)	15.9 (19.6)	14.6 (21.2)	2.1	–	–	–	3.3	–	8.5 (Note: Yoshihiko Noda (CDP): 2.8%; Yuichiro Tamaki (DPFP): 5.7%)	44.3 (34.6)
2–3 Aug	JNN	1,003	11.1	16.7	20.4	3.4	1.7	1.1	2.3	5.2	0.8	26.8 (Note: Yoshihiko Noda (CDP): 3.8%; Seiji Maehara (Ishin): 0.5%; Yuichiro Tamaki (DPFP): 4.4%; Others: 18.1%)	10.5
26–27 Jul	Sankei/FNN	1,030	9.4	22.4	16	4.1	1.5	1	1.8	4.1	0.6	12.2 (Note: Yoshihiko Noda (CDP): 4.2%; Seiji Maehara (Ishin): 1.2%; Yuichiro Tamaki (DPFP): 6.8%)	26.9 (Note: None of these: 21.2%; Don't know: 5.7%)
26–27 Jul	ANN	1,020	13	20	23	5	4	2	1	6	0	10	16
26–27 Jul	Mainichi/SSRC	2,045	20	15	8	2	2	–	–	–	–	16 (Note: Fumio Kishida (LDP): 3%; Yoshihiko Noda (CDP): 5%; Yuichiro Tamaki (DPFP): 8%)	37 (Note: Don't know: 31%; No answer: 6%)
25–27 Jul	Nikkei/TV Tokyo	937	6	20	20	5	2	2	–	4	–	20 (Note: Fumio Kishida (LDP): 3%; Shun'ichi Suzuki (LDP): 1%; Ken Saitō (LDP): 1%; Yoshihiko Noda (CDP): 5%; Seiji Maehara (Ishin): 1%; Yuichiro Tamaki (DPFP): 9%)	21
21–22 Jul	Yomiuri/NNN	1,043	8	26	22	2	3	2	2	7	1	2 (Note: Fumio Kishida (LDP): 2%)	25 (Note: None of these: 14%; Don't know: 11%)
14–15 Jun	Sankei/FNN	1,027	7.9	16.4	20.7	2.4	1.3	1.2	1	4.2	0.4	11.1 (Note: Yoshihiko Noda (CDP): 6.8%; Seiji Maehara (Ishin): 0.2%; Yuichiro Tamaki (DPFP): 4.1%)	33.4 (Note: None of these: 25%; Don't know: 8.4%)
14–15 Jun	Senkyo.com/JX	990	15.4	15.6	19.9	6	–	–	–	2.5	–	23.1 (Note: Yoshihiko Noda (CDP): 6.5%; Seiji Maehara (Ishin): 1%; Yuichiro Tamaki (DPFP): 2.5%; Others: 13.1%)	17.6
24–25 May	Kyodo News	1,064	7.3	21.5	15.9	2.6	3	1.1	4.6	5.1	1.4	15.8 (Note: Yoshihiko Noda (CDP): 5.4%; Seiji Maehara (Ishin): 0.5%; Yuichiro Tamaki (DPFP): 9.3%; Others: 0.6%)	21.7
17–18 May	Sankei/FNN	1,025	7.7	18.9	15.2	1.5	1.9	1.9	2	4.6	0.4	12 (Note: Yoshihiko Noda (CDP): 5.5%; Seiji Maehara (Ishin): 0.6%; Yuichiro Tamaki (DPFP): 5.9%)	33.8 (Note: None of these: 27.6%; Don't know: 6.2%)

== Results ==
Full results by round
Candidate	First Round								Runoff					
Candidate	Diet members		Party members				Total points		Diet members		Prefectural chapters		Total points	
Candidate	Votes	%	Popular votes	%	Allocated votes	%	Total votes	%	Votes	%	Votes	%	Total votes	%
Sanae Takaichi 当	64	21.77%	250,931	40.05%	119	40.34%	183	31.07%	149	50.68%	36	76.60%	185	54.25%
Shinjirō Koizumi	80	27.21%	179,130	28.59%	84	28.48%	164	27.84%	145	49.32%	11	23.40%	156	45.75%
Yoshimasa Hayashi	72	24.49%	130,888	20.89%	62	21.02%	134	22.75%	Eliminated					
Takayuki Kobayashi	44	14.97%	32,263	5.15%	15	5.08%	59	10.02%	Eliminated					
Toshimitsu Motegi	34	11.56%	33,343	5.32%	15	5.08%	49	8.32%	Eliminated					
Total	294	100.00%	626,555	100.00%	295	100.00%	589	100.00%	294	100.00%	47	100.00%	341	100.00%
Valid votes	294	99.66%	626,555	99,54%	295	100.00%	589	100.00%	294	99.66%	47	100.00%	341	99.71%
Invalid and blank votes	1	0.34%	2,901	0,46%	0	0.00%	0	0.00%	1	0.34%	0	0.00%	1	0.29%
Turnout	295	100.00%	629,456	68.69%	295	100.00%	589	99.86%	295	100.00%	47	100.00%	342	100.00%
Registered voters	295	100.00%	916,400	100.00%	295	100.00%	590	100.00%	295	100.00%	47	100.00%	342	100.00%

=== Results of Party Members' Votes by Prefectures (First Round) ===
Results of Party Members' Votes by Prefectures
Prefectures	Sanae Takaichi		Shinjirō Koizumi		Yoshimasa Hayashi		Takayuki Kobayashi		Toshimitsu Motegi	
Prefectures	Votes	%	Votes	%	Votes	%	Votes	%	Votes	%
Aichi	15,794	49.0%	8,327	25.8%	5,226	16.2%	2,176	6.7%	725	2.2%
Akita	2,230	33.6%	3,047	45.9%	1,070	16.1%	196	3.0%	99	1.5%
Aomori	2,369	32.8%	2,685	37.2%	1,009	14.0%	567	7.9%	588	8.1%
Chiba	6,438	36.7%	4,061	23.1%	2,109	12.0%	4,585	26.1%	351	2.0%
Ehime	4,731	41.8%	3,299	29.1%	1,969	17.4%	1,027	9.1%	294	2.6%
Fukui	3,257	48.7%	1,610	24.1%	1,340	20.1%	247	3.7%	228	3.4%
Fukuoka	7,805	43.4%	3,922	21.8%	5,276	29.3%	692	3.8%	301	1.7%
Fukushima	2,481	30.7%	3,403	42.1%	1,674	20.7%	264	3.3%	253	3.1%
Gifu	8,002	38.8%	7,085	34.4%	3,854	18.7%	1,111	5.4%	550	2.7%
Gunma	5,304	34.9%	4,533	29.8%	2,344	15.4%	1,276	8.4%	1,735	11.4%
Hiroshima	5,485	35.0%	3,076	19.6%	6,118	39.0%	462	2.9%	539	3.4%
Hokkaido	9,437	40.8%	6,830	29.5%	3,763	16.3%	1,563	6.8%	1,526	6.6%
Hyōgo	9,477	55.0%	3,493	20.3%	3,407	19.8%	565	3.3%	287	1.7%
Ibaraki	7,600	30.4%	8,345	33.4%	3,992	16.0%	800	3.2%	4,227	16.9%
Ishikawa	6,022	44.9%	3,580	26.7%	2,942	21.9%	614	4.6%	263	2.0%
Iwate	1,586	33.2%	1,634	34.2%	1,223	25.6%	223	4.7%	117	2.4%
Kagawa	3,572	35.6%	2,880	28.7%	2,332	23.2%	1,021	10.2%	237	2.4%
Kagoshima	3,676	33.8%	4,726	43.5%	1,964	18.1%	299	2.8%	201	1.8%
Kanagawa	13,782	35.4%	18,650	47.9%	4,180	10.7%	1,633	4.2%	692	1.8%
Kōchi	2,210	47.3%	1,078	23.0%	1,220	26.1%	103	2.2%	66	1.4%
Kumamoto	3,789	32.9%	2,730	23.7%	4,307	37.4%	251	2.2%	442	3.8%
Kyoto	4,153	49.8%	1,760	21.1%	1,693	20.3%	572	6.9%	160	1.9%
Mie	2,920	38.0%	1,644	21.4%	2,139	27.8%	888	11.5%	98	1.3%
Miyagi	2,602	34.3%	1,928	25.4%	2,405	31.7%	345	4.6%	301	4.0%
Miyazaki	2,643	34.9%	2,375	31.4%	2,239	29.6%	167	2.2%	150	2.0%
Nagano	3,877	40.8%	2,354	24.8%	2,706	28.5%	365	3.8%	198	2.1%
Nagasaki	4,389	40.6%	2,576	23.8%	3,430	31.7%	244	2.3%	184	1.7%
Nara	5,876	86.9%	442	6.5%	331	4.9%	69	1.0%	44	0.7%
Niigata	6,017	40.5%	4,286	28.9%	2,986	20.1%	1,235	8.3%	323	2.2%
Ōita	3,901	42.3%	2,507	27.2%	2,313	25.1%	295	3.2%	211	2.3%
Okayama	5,304	41.4%	4,770	37.2%	2,164	16.9%	355	2.8%	226	1.8%
Okinawa	1,343	30.8%	2,447	56.5%	249	5.7%	69	1.6%	250	5.7%
Osaka	11,896	59.3%	3,809	19.0%	3,042	15.2%	795	4.0%	527	2.6%
Saga	2,270	37.1%	1,691	27.6%	1,466	23.9%	253	4.1%	445	7.3%
Saitama	9,784	41.2%	7,353	31.0%	4,048	17.1%	805	3.4%	1,729	7.3%
Shiga	2,815	42.6%	2,080	31.5%	1,382	20.9%	200	3.0%	136	2.1%
Shimane	2,018	26.7%	2,184	28.9%	2,557	33.9%	185	2.5%	601	8.0%
Shizuoka	8,650	43.4%	6,162	30.9%	3,755	18.8%	927	4.6%	445	2.2%
Tochigi	2,448	19.9%	1,506	12.2%	573	4.6%	138	1.1%	7,660	62.2%
Tokushima	1,849	41.9%	1,307	29.6%	1,012	22.9%	153	3.5%	90	0.2%
Tokyo	24,174	46.8%	13,075	25.3%	9,848	19.1%	2,547	4.9%	1,988	3.9%
Tottori	1,254	19.1%	2,120	32.4%	3,019	46.1%	90	1.4%	66	1.0%
Toyama	6,100	37.9%	5,013	31.1%	3,046	18.9%	654	4.1%	1,303	8.1%
Wakayama	2,284	41.0%	1,218	21.9%	1,355	24.3%	643	11.5%	70	1.3%
Yamagata	1,639	23.8%	2,438	35.5%	1,261	18.3%	134	1.9%	1,401	20.4%
Yamaguchi	2,993	26.7%	745	6.6%	7,235	64.5%	186	1.7%	56	0.5%
Yamanashi	2,685	28.0%	2,346	24.5%	3,315	34.6%	274	2.9%	960	10.0%
Total	250,931	40.0%	179,130	28.6%	130,888	20.9%	32,263	5.1%	33,343	5.3%

== Aftermath ==
=== Reactions ===
==== Domestic ====
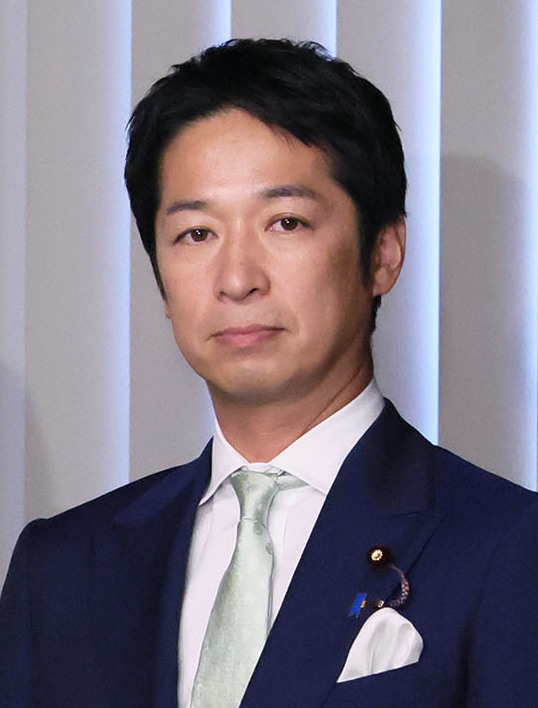
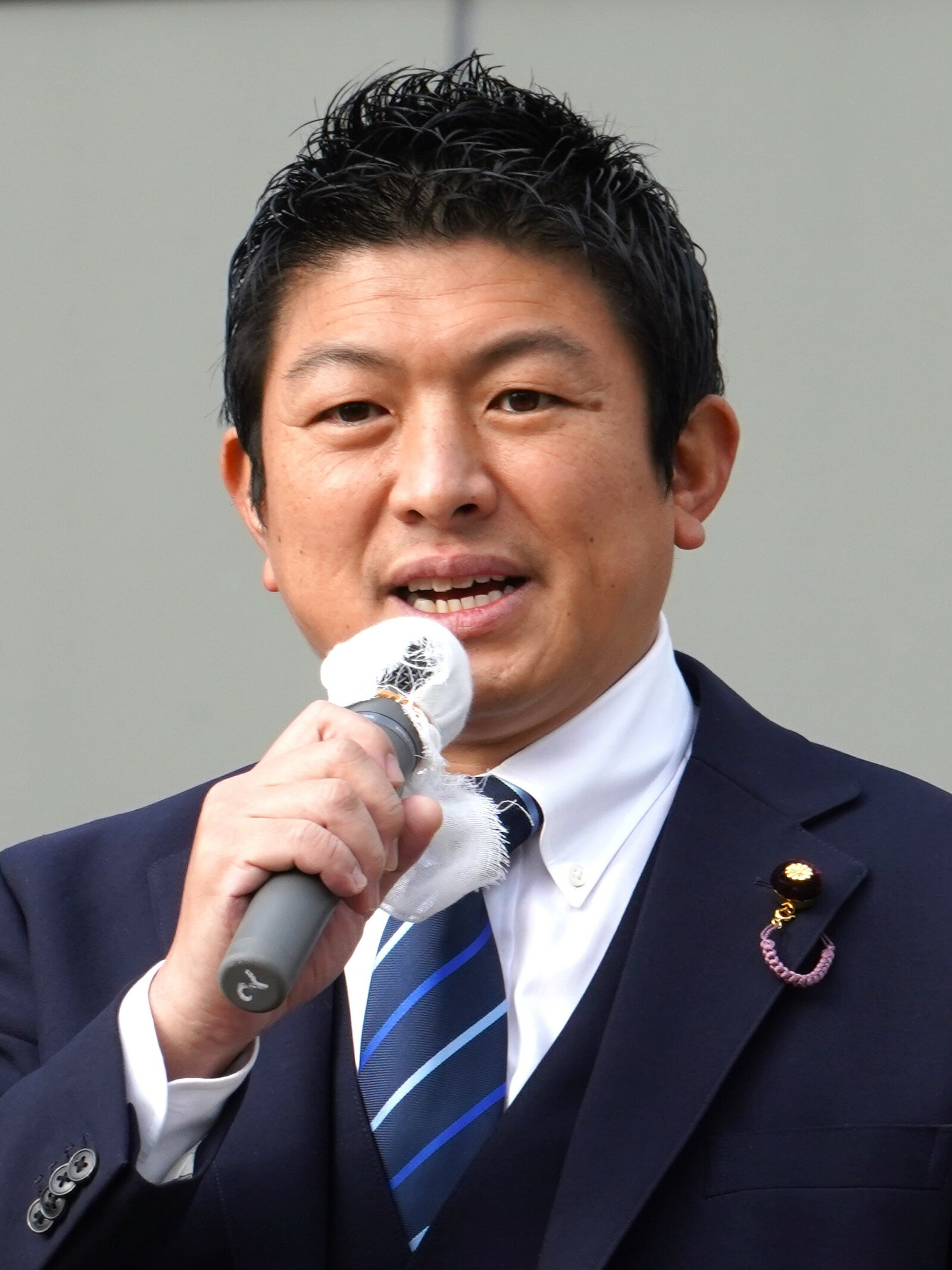
Ishin no Kai co-leader Fumitake Fujita and Sanseito leader Sohei Kamiya welcomed Takaichi's election as LDP president due to her conservative views

Takayuki Kobayashi, who finished in fourth place during the first round of voting, said he voted for Takaichi in the runoff. Koizumi hinted that he would lobby to have some of his own supporters to "play an active role" in the party and potentially the next government. Koizumi later stated on 10 October that he has not been offered a major role in Takaichi's Cabinet; Takaichi has said she planned to appoint Koizumi and Hayashi to key positions. Later the Yomiuri Shimbun reported that Takaichi was considering making Koizumi her defense minister and Hayashi the Minister for Internal Affairs and Communications in her cabinet.

Ishin no Kai co-leader Fumitake Fujita said he had close policy views with Takaichi on issues including Constitutional revision and the Imperial Family succession debate. Former Ishin co-leader Seiji Maehara criticized his party "leaning into" a potential coalition with a Koizumi-led government during the election. Sanseito leader Sohei Kamiya stated that his party welcomed Takaichi's victory, considering similarity in ideological and policy views; he said his party would “not hesitate to cooperate on policies that align with national interests.” During the election, Takaichi said she would be willing to work with Sanseito and the far-right Conservative Party.

The main opposition Constitutional Democratic Party (CDP) was much more critical of Takaichi. Party leader and former prime minister Yoshikiko Noda described Takaichi's appointment of Aso faction members to her leadership team as "classic LDP," and criticized the dominance of factions within the LDP. CDP policy chief Satoshi Honjo claimed that Takaichi would be a 'puppet' of Taro Aso and his faction.

==== International ====
After Takaichi's election as party president, several world leaders praised Takaichi and congratulated her. U.S. president Donald Trump praised Takaichi's "wisdom and strength" and congratulated Takaichi and the people of Japan. President of Taiwan Lai Ching-te congratulated Takaichi, calling her a "steadfast friend of Taiwan". Meanwhile, China's Ministry of Foreign Affairs issued a statement stating their hope that Japan would "adhere to the principles and consensus of the four China-Japan political documents" and "pursue a positive and rational policy toward China".

=== Analysis ===
The Gender Inequality Index for 2019, featured Japan on the far right in a dark green. The GII has ranked Japan at 19th out of 188 countries in 2019, with a main critique being lack of female politicians in parliament.

Takaichi became the first woman president of the LDP. Many saw Takaichi likely becoming the country's first female prime minister as a "conundrum" for gender equality given Japan's high gender inequality and Takaichi's own policies. The Associated Press wrote that Takaichi "is an ultra-conservative star of a male-dominated party that critics call an obstacle to women's advancement" in a "country that ranks poorly internationally for gender equality". Takaichi's political rise in the LDP was called a "paradox" while some believed that her becoming prime minister would not have an impact on gender inequality given her conservative views. The BBC anticipated the winner of the election would face the "daunting task" of balancing relations with the United States while tackling inflation and managing rising costs of living, were they to be elected prime minister. They described Takaichi as a "hardline conservative" whose views on women were "in line with the LDP's policy of having women serve in traditional roles."

The Guardian described Takaichi's election as a "gender breakthrough" but warned it "could bring more uncertainty, particularly on the international stage" due to Takaichi's statements regarding Korean comfort women and Imperial Japan's conduct during World War II. The Asahi Shimbun anticipated Takaichi may tone down her views regarding the controversial Yasukuni Shrine, but also expressed concern at her ability to deal with U.S. president Donald Trump. Nikkei Asia said the election exposed an "identity crisis" within the party, while the Financial Times criticized the candidates for not advocating for bolder ideas and "big-picture visions", as opposed to Koizumi's father Junichiro Koizumi, and Shinzo Abe, widely regarded as Takaichi's mentor.

The election was considered something of an upset, as Koizumi was largely anticipated to prevail in the event of a runoff against Takaichi. Mainichi noted that Koizumi's support base was more "reluctant" as opposed to Takaichi's "fervent" ideological supporters; the paper alleged many of Koizumi's supporters were backing him simply in hopes of winning the next general election. Asahi reported Koizumi's campaign had been prematurely celebrating a presumed victory in the election the night before results were announced, while Takaichi and her team were busy calling lawmakers and local party chapters for their support; the paper claimed that an "unexpectedly strong" turnout of local conservatism ultimately turned the tide in favor of Takaichi. Koizumi's own father, Junichiro, reportedly told Ishiba at a dinner following the election that his son did not consult with him on running for party leader, and admitted he still believed Shinjiro was too young to become prime minister.

=== Impact ===
==== Economic ====
Upon her election as party president, one of the early issues that Takaichi will have to face as prime minister is rising inflation and defending her support of Abenomics. It was already speculated that a Takaichi government would look into a rate hike of the Bank of Japan early into her possible tenure as prime minister. Takaichi's close economic advisor Takuji Aida said "Takaichi will tolerate another 25-basis-point rate hike by January next year on condition the BOJ keeps monetary policy loose, and solid economic health and sufficient wage growth can be foreseen". After Takaichi's election, the Nikkei 225 share gauge surged past the 47,000 level for the first time and the yen slid in terms of its value. The Nikkei jumped over 4% to hit a record high and the index closed 4.75% higher to end the trading day at 47,944.76 two days after Takaichi's election; however, the value of the yen lost 1.8% against the dollar to past 150 and fell to an all-time low against the euro.

==== Party structure ====
Asahi reported that Takaichi would appoint Shun'ichi Suzuki as Secretary-General and would return Taro Aso as party vice president, cementing the Aso faction as the dominant force behind Takaichi. Despite his ministerial experience, Suzuki lacked relationships with opposition parties. Takaichi officially unveiled the party's new executive committee on 7 October, which also included former Women's Empowerment Minister Haruko Arimura as General Affairs Chairman, former Economic Security Security Minister and presidential rival Takayuki Kobayashi as Policy Research Council Chairman, and former National Public Safety Commission Chairman Keiji Furuya as Election Strategy Committee chairman. Mainichi reported that Takaichi's campaign team had been negotiating with the teams of Kobayashi and Motegi, as well as the Aso faction, as early as September 30, in order to secure their Diet member votes. The Saneki Shimbun described Takaichi's picks as a “second Aso administration” in reference to Taro Aso's tenure as prime minister in 2009.

==== Collapse of the LDP–Komeito coalition ====
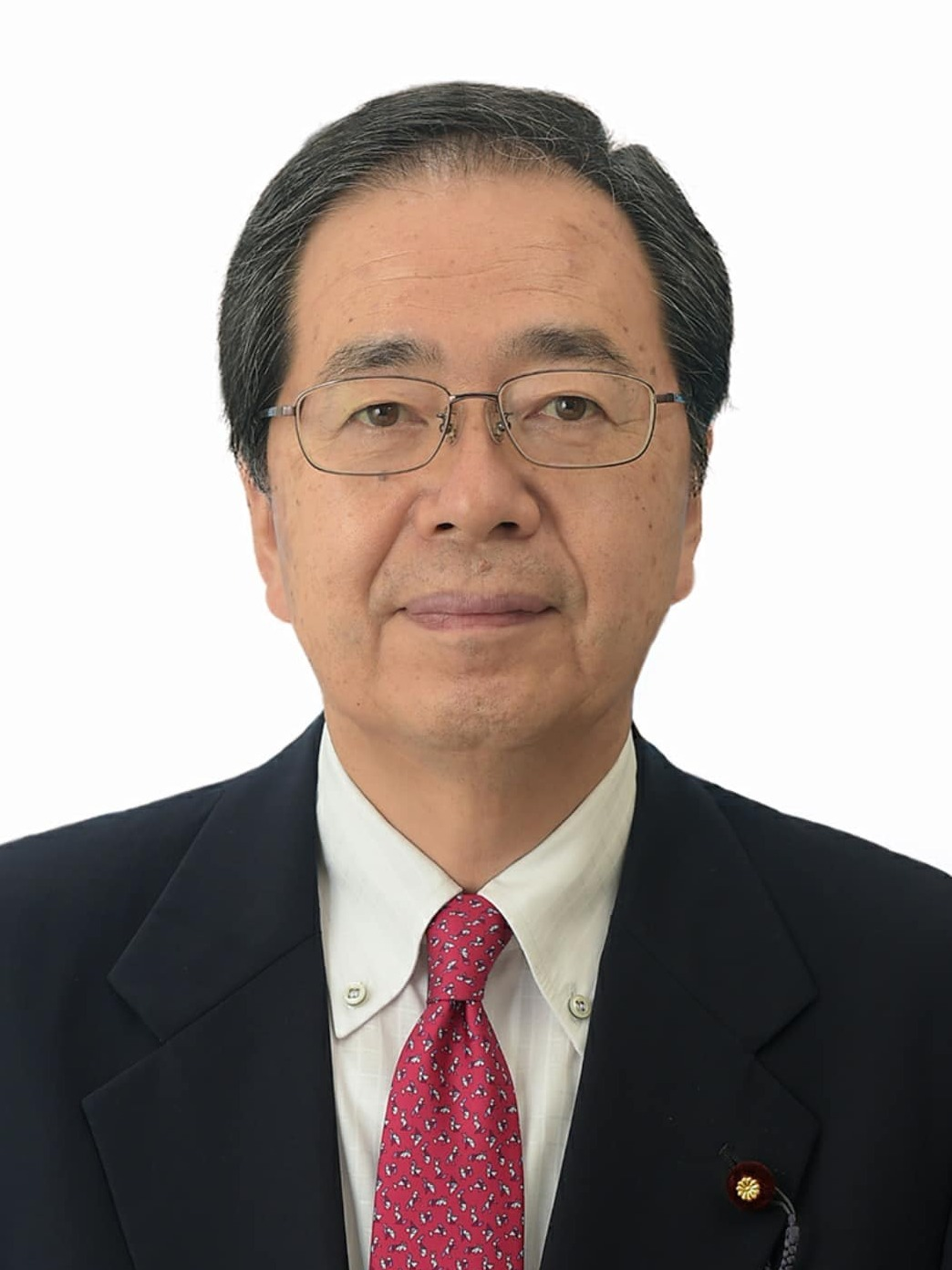
Komeito Chief Representative Tetsuo Saito announced his party would leave the coalition with the LDP on 10 October.

The Japan Times predicted that the election could be a “turning point” for the Komeito. Throughout the election, various leaks to the press supposedly originating from the LDP's coalition partner, the Komeito, indicated their dislike for Takaichi. Reportedly, the party leadership preferred Koizumi or Hayashi. As early as 7 September, Komeito's Chief Representative, Tetsuo Saito stated his party would not form a coalition government with a LDP president that does not align with the principles of ‘conservative centrism’. On 7 October, the Komeito held an emergency executive meeting to discuss the future of the coalition with the LDP; reportedly, concerns within Soka Gakkai, the new religious movement behind the party, expressed concern over Takaichi's leadership. That same day, Saito and Takaichi met, but were unable to reach a coalition agreement to form a new government, the first time since Shinzo Abe returned to power in 2012. The issue of restricting corporate donations to political campaigns dominated much of the disagreement between Takaichi and Saito. The Komeito held another emergency meeting on 9 October, where executives and representatives of prefectural party chapters reportedly urged the party to abandon the coalition.

"We have entered an entirely new political landscape. The existing political system is no longer capable of responding to the people's aspirations or the current reality."

- Yuichiro Tamaki, leader of the DPFP, commenting on the collapse of the coalition.

On 10 October, Komeito announced they would split off from the LDP's coalition and stated their members would not vote to confirm Takaichi as prime minister. Saito said the party decided to leave the coalition due to Takaichi's unwillingness to fully address the LDP's handling of the slush fund scandal. Takaichi had already appointed several members implicated in the scandal to senior positions within the party. Asahi wrote Takaichi's appointments were "heavily skewed to her rightist views" and did not reflect party unity or moderation.

A poll from Kyodo News found that 77.5% of respondents believed slush fund implicated lawmakers should not be in positions of power, including in the Cabinet or party leadership. Saito explicitly mentioned Koichi Hagiuda, whom Takaichi had appointed to a senior position with the party, as a major concern for the Komeito. Asahi also observed that Komeito's leadership was upset with Takaichi's reported “secret meeting” with Yuichiro Tamaki, the leader of the DPFP, before meeting with the leaders of Komeito. Saito said that his party rejoining the coalition was not off the table, but it would be predicated on the LDP accepting Komeito's demands regarding political donations and resolving the slush fund scandal. By 12 October, Komeito had already been in talks with opposition parties in the Diet, beginning a shift into the opposition. The coalition lasted over 26 years and had carried through 17 separate LDP-led cabinets.

=== Election of new Prime Minister ===
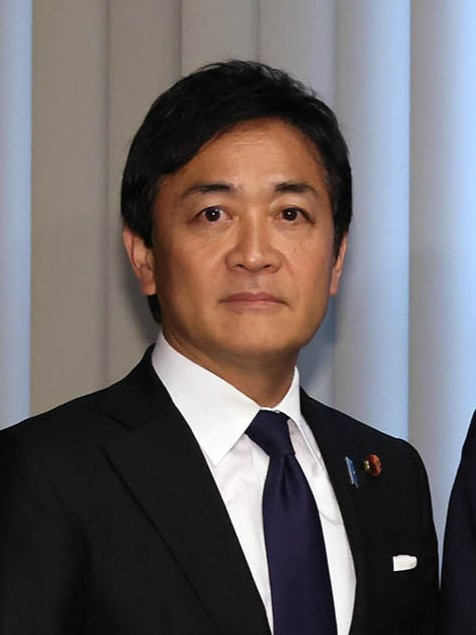
Following the Komeito's withdrawal from the LDP-led coalition, DPFP Leader Yuichiro Tamaki was seen as the leading opposition candidate for prime minister. He cited security policy as a main condition of joining a new opposition-led coalition, leading to disagreement with the CDP.

An extraordinary session of the Diet is scheduled to be convened to designate a new prime minister in mid-October. Following Komeito splitting from the LDP, the vote to confirm a new prime minister was postponed from its original 15 October date to five days later on 20 October. The Diet's reconvening was then moved to 21 October. As the date of the vote kept getting pushed back, Ishiba's tenure as prime minister was extended. At first Takaichi was considered likely to be confirmed as the country's first female prime minister. However, following Komeito's withdrawal from the LDP coalition, Takaichi's bid to become prime minister was becoming increasingly difficult. The LDP's minority government status was further weakened, prompting the possibility of opposition cooperation to elect a non-LDP prime minister and inaugurate a new government. The Asahi Shimbun reported on 5 October that Takaichi's ideal coalition partner was the Democratic Party For the People (DPFP).

Five days later on 10 October, while Takaichi said she would attempt to regain the LDP's coalition with Komeito, it appeared necessary for Takaichi to reach out to centre-right parties such as Ishin no Kai (the Japan Innovation Party) to get her confirmed as prime minister. That same day, the center-left Constitutional Democratic Party (CDP) announced they would be willing to coalesce around DPFP Leader Yuichiro Tamaki to be the opposition's main candidate against Takaichi for prime minister. The CDP also signaled a desire to work with the Komeito. The Komeito seemed open to voting for an opposition candidate in the runoff vote, but also considered directing its members to either abstain or write the name of its leader, Tetsuo Saito. On 13 October, the CDP said it would seek collaborative meetings with Ishin and the DPFP, seeking alignment on policy ahead of the premiership vote.

On 14 October, it was reported by Reuters that Takaichi would meet with the country's three main opposition parties the next day. That same day, The Japan Times listed several scenarios that may occur during the Diet confirmation vote if Takaichi is not confirmed as prime minister. The scenarios listed stated that outgoing prime minister Shigeru Ishiba could remain in office for a longer period of time to allow Takaichi or the LDP to rebuild a coalition, Takaichi resigning as LDP president and triggering a new presidential election or Tamaki being elected prime minister should the Komeito also coalesce around him. Tamaki stated that alignment on basic policy, including security issues and energy policy, would be a required to form a government with other parties, and asked the CDP to adjust its security policy. In response, the CDP urged the DPFP to compromise, and expressed frustration with Tamaki. Ishin leader Hirofumi Yoshimura, the governor of Osaka, also said cooperation on security policy would be a condition for uniting in the vote for prime minister. Ishin co-leader Fujita Fumitake further stated agreement on energy policy and revising the Constitution would be required to form a coalition. Lower House LDP member Hajime Funada called on Takaichi to resign and called for a new party presidential election to elect a leader who can "rebuild a coalition framework".

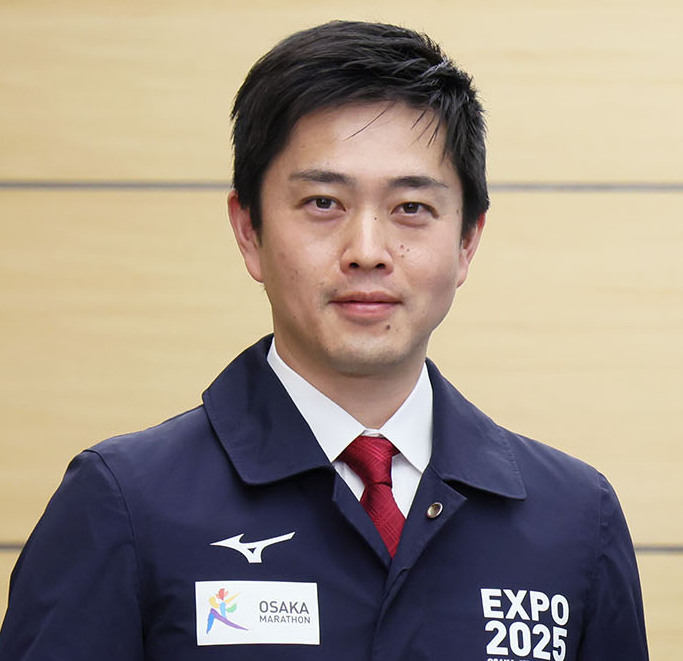
After Takaichi met with Ishin leader Hirofumi Yoshimura (Governor of Osaka Prefecture) on 15 October, a LDP-Ishin coalition was announced on 19 October.

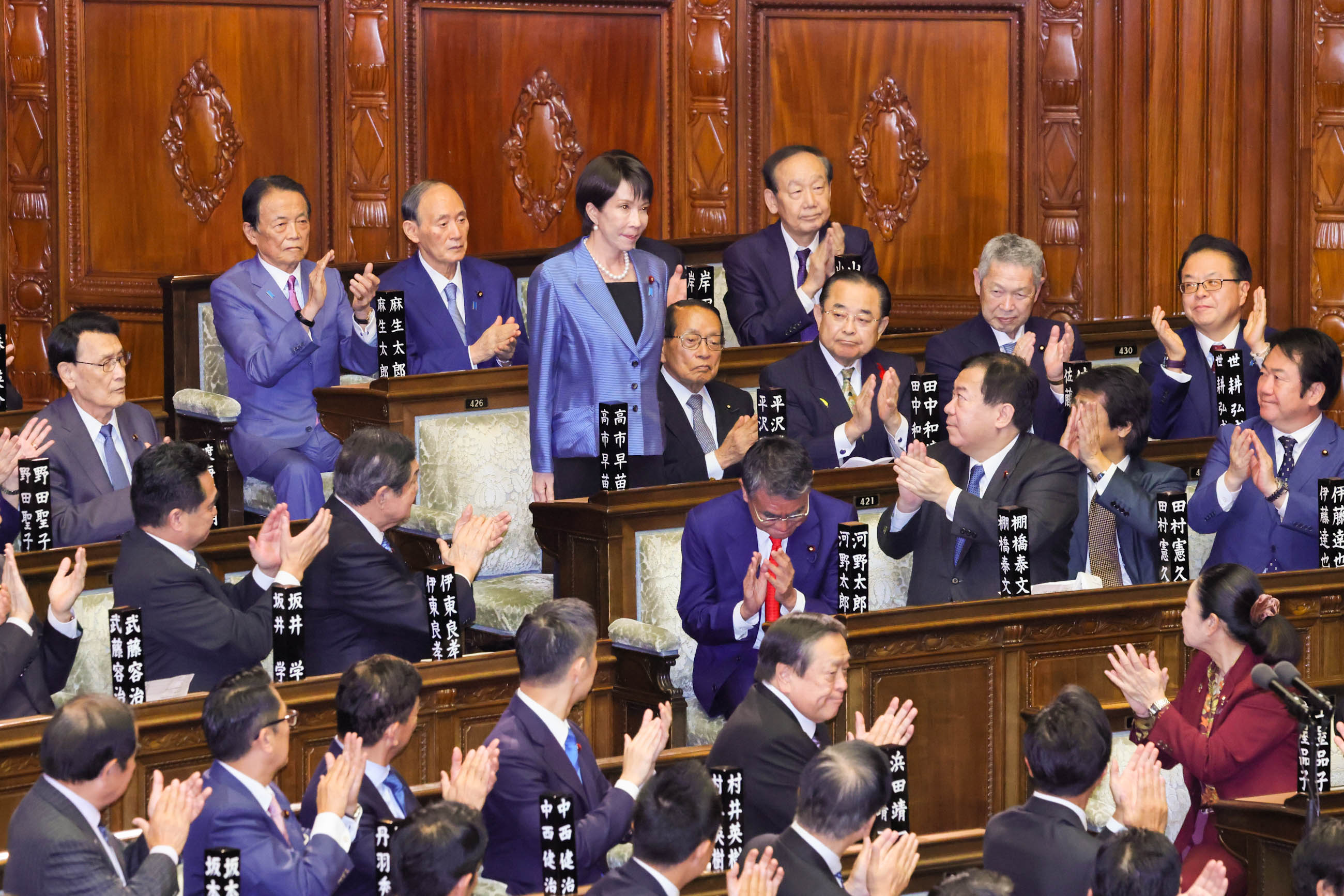
Takaichi was elected and confirmed by the National Diet on 21 October 2025. She became the country's first female prime minister after the appointment by Emperor Naruhito at the Tokyo Imperial Palace.

On 15 October, during a special session of the National Diet, lawmakers were unable to vote on an official date for the confirmation vote, allowing Takaichi more time to build a coalition. That same day, Takaichi met with Yoshimura to discuss a possible coalition between Ishin and the LDP, and an alliance to confirm Takaichi as prime minister. Ishin-co leader Fumitake also met with Tamaki and CDP Leader Yoshihiko Noda. Tamaki also met with Takaichi, who asked for cooperation with the vote in the Diet. CDP secretary general Jun Azumi insisted the DPFP had two options: supplement the LDP or join forces with the CDP and other parties to end the LDP's domination in the Diet. Earlier that day, it was announced the sole lawmaker of the Anti-NHK Party, Upper House member Kenichiro Saito, would caucus with the LDP.

The situation in the Diet was becoming increasingly chaotic and unpredictable; as an LDP-Ishin coalition seemed more likely, the opposition, particularly the CDP and DPFP, floundered on cooperation regarding defense policy, as Tamaki himself continued to be evasive about joining a new coalition. The following day, it was reported that the Ishin no Kai were more likely to coalesce around Takaichi and any possible three-way coalition talks with Tamaki seemed to dwindle, increasing Takaichi's odds to be confirmed as prime minister. On 17 October, the Diet officially voted to set 21 October as the session confirmation date. On 19 October, it was announced that the LDP and the Japan Innovation Party agreed to form a coalition. The following day, the Associated Press reported that Takaichi was on track to be confirmed as the country's first female prime minister. On 21 October, Takaichi was confirmed to be the prime minister-designate after garnering 237 votes, majority in the lower house and she became the country's first female prime minister following the appointment by Emperor Naruhito at the Tokyo Imperial Palace.
