= Aichi 10th district =

Legislative district of Japan

- Parliamentary constituency for the Japanese House of Representatives
- Numbered map of Aichi Prefecture single-member districts
- Prefecture: Aichi
- Proportional District: Tokai
- Electorate: 352,851

Current constituency
- Created: 1994
- Seats: One
- Party: LDP
- Representative: Shinji Wakayama
- Municipalities: Ichinomiya and Iwakura.

Aichi 10th district (愛知県第10区, Aichi-ken dai-juku or simply 愛知10区, Aichi-ken juku) is a single-member constituency of the House of Representatives in the national Diet of Japan located in Aichi Prefecture.

== Areas covered ==
=== since 2022 ===
- Ichinomiya
- Iwakura

=== 2013 - 2022 ===
- Part of Ichinomiya
- Iwakura
- Kōnan
- Niwa District

=== 2002 - 2013 ===
- Ichinomiya
- Iwakura
- Kōnan
- Niwa District
- Haguri District

=== 1994 - 2002 ===
- Ichinomiya
- Iwakura
- Kōnan
- Inuyama
- Niwa District
- Haguri District

== List of representatives ==
Election	Representative	Party	Notes
1996	Tetsuma Esaki	New Frontier	
1996	Tetsuma Esaki	Liberal	
1996	Tetsuma Esaki	New Conservative	
2000	Kanju Satō	Democratic	
2003	Tetsuma Esaki	New Conservative	
2005	Tetsuma Esaki	LDP	
2009	Kazumi Sugimoto	Democratic	
2009	Kazumi Sugimoto	Your	
2012	Tetsuma Esaki	LDP	
2014	Tetsuma Esaki	LDP	
2017	Tetsuma Esaki	LDP	
2021	Tetsuma Esaki	LDP	
2024	Norimasa Fujiwara	CDP	
2026	Shinji Wakayama	LDP	

== Election results ==
=== 2026 ===
2026
Party	Candidate	Votes	%	±%
LDP	Shinji Wakayama	80,646	42.1	▲6.5
Centrist Reform	Norimasa Fujiwara	43,496	22.7	▼12.0
Ishin	Kazumi Sugimoto	28,434	14.8	▼15.9
DPP	Ryōhei Mishima	21,072	11.0	
Sanseitō	Ryōhei Yamauchi	17,891	9.3	
Registered electors		348,845		
Turnout			55.77	▲4.98
LDP gain from Centrist Reform				

=== 2024 ===
2024
Party	Candidate	Votes	%	±%
CDP	Norimasa Fujiwara	59,691	34.67	▲11.63
LDP	Shinji Wakayama (elected in Tōkai PR block)	59,529	34.57	▼0.44
Ishin	Kazumi Sugimoto (PR seat incumbent) (elected in Tōkai PR block)	52,957	30.76	▲3.74
Majority		162	0.10	
Registered electors		350,570		
Turnout			50.79	▼3.70
CDP gain from LDP				

=== 2021 ===
2021
Party	Candidate	Votes	%	±%
LDP	Tetsuma Esaki (incumbent)	81,107	35.01	
Ishin	Kazumi Sugimoto (PR seat incumbent) (elected in Tōkai PR block)	62,601	27.02	
CDP	Norimasa Fujiwara	53,375	23.04	New
Reiwa	Misako Yasui	20,989	9.06	New
JCP	Masafumi Itakura	13,605	5.87	
Majority		18,506	7.99	
Registered electors		436,560		
Turnout			54.49	▲1.12
LDP hold				

=== 2017 ===
2017
Party	Candidate	Votes	%	±%
LDP	Tetsuma Esaki (incumbent)	88,171	39.01	
Kibō no Tō	Misako Yasui	66,560	29.45	New
Ishin	Kazumi Sugimoto (won PR seat)	44,258	19.58	New
JCP	Masafumi Itakura	27,044	11.96	
Majority		21,611	9.56	
Registered electors		436,482		
Turnout			53.37	▲2.68
LDP hold				

=== 2014 ===
2014
Party	Candidate	Votes	%	±%
Liberal Democratic (endorsed by Komeito)	Tetsuma Esaki (incumbent)	91,978	44.49	
Independent	Kazumi Sugimoto (PR seat incumbent)	45,702	22.11	New
Democratic	Hiroko Kobayashi	43,672	21.13	
Communist	Masafumi Itakura	25,376	12.28	
Majority		46,276	22.38	
Registered electors		422,754		
Turnout			50.69	▼6.51
LDP hold				

=== 2012 ===
2012
Party	Candidate	Votes	%	±%
Liberal Democratic (endorsed by Komeito)	Tetsuma Esaki	96,548	41.44	
Your (endorsed by JRP, NRP)	Kazumi Sugimoto (incumbent) (won PR seat)	60,563	25.99	New
Democratic (endorsed by PNP)	Kazuya Matsuo	33,459	14.36	
Tomorrow (endorsed by Daichi)	Hajime Takahashi	25,671	11.02	New
Communist	Masafumi Itakura	16,751	7.19	N/A
Majority		35,985	15.45	
Registered electors		420,971		
Turnout			57.20	▼12.40
LDP gain from Your				

=== 2009 ===
2009
Party	Candidate	Votes	%	±%
Democratic	Kazumi Sugimoto	172,401	60.71	
Liberal Democratic	Tetsuma Esaki (incumbent)	103,704	36.52	
Happiness Realization	Akinori Nakamura	7,861	2.77	New
Majority		68,697	24.19	
Registered electors		417,772		
Turnout			69.60	▲2.92
Democratic gain from LDP				

=== 2005 ===
2005
Party	Candidate	Votes	%	±%
Liberal Democratic	Tetsuma Esaki (incumbent)	140,622	52.71	N/A
Democratic	Kazumi Sugimoto	104,827	39.29	
Communist	Tamotsu Ishida	21,350	8.00	
Majority		35,795	13.42	
Registered electors		408,424		
Turnout			66.68	▲7.12
LDP hold				

=== 2003 ===
2003
Party	Candidate	Votes	%	±%
New Conservative	Tetsuma Esaki	107,369	45.63	
Democratic	Kanju Sato (incumbent) (won PR seat)	106,599	45.30	
Communist	Tomoko Kishino	21,350	9.07	
Majority		770	0.33	
Registered electors		404,493		
Turnout			59.56	
New Conservative gain from Democratic				

=== 2000 ===
2000
Party	Candidate	Votes	%	±%
Democratic	Kanju Sato	99,970	36.53	New
New Conservative	Tetsuma Esaki (incumbent)	86,416	31.58	New
Liberal Democratic	Masahiro Suzuki	57,047	20.85	New
Communist	Tamotsu Ishida	27,324	9.99	
Liberal League	Hachiro Ishikawa	2,881	1.05	New
Majority		13,554	4.95	
Turnout				
Democratic gain from New Conservative				

=== 1996 ===
1996
Party	Candidate	Votes	%	±%
New Frontier	Tetsuma Esaki	110,820	46.44	New
Liberal Democratic	Haruo Mori	72,178	30.24	New
Communist	Tomoko Kishino	29,003	12.15	New
Democratic	Sachiko Naganawa	20,575	8.62	New
Independent	Senya Shimizu	5,103	2.14	New
People's Party	Shinsuke Takahashi	683	0.29	New
Independent	Toyoji Atsuji	284	0.12	New
Majority		38,642	16.20	
Turnout				
New Frontier win (new seat)				
