= Aichi 9th district =

Legislative district of Japan

- Parliamentary constituency for the Japanese House of Representatives
- Numbered map of Aichi Prefecture single-member districts
- Prefecture: Aichi
- Proportional District: Tokai
- Electorate: 381,372

Current constituency
- Created: 1994
- Seats: One
- Party: LDP
- Representative: Yasumasa Nagasaka
- Municipalities: Ama, Aisai, Inazawa, Tsushima, Yatomi, and Ama District.

Aichi 9th district (愛知県第9区, Aichi-ken dai-kyuku or simply 愛知9区, Aichi-ken kyuku) is a single-member constituency of the House of Representatives in the national Diet of Japan located in Aichi Prefecture.

== Areas covered ==
=== since 2022 ===
- Ama
- Aisai
- Inazawa
- Tsushima
- Yatomi
- Ama District

=== 2013 - 2022 ===
- Part of Ichinomiya
  - Former Bisai area
- Ama
- Aisai
- Inazawa
- Tsushima
- Yatomi
- Ama District

=== 1994 - 2013 ===
- Bisai
- Inazawa
- Tsushima
- Ama District
- Nakashima District

== List of representatives ==
Election	Representative	Party	Notes
1996	Toshiki Kaifu	New Frontier	
1996	Toshiki Kaifu	Liberal	
2000	Toshiki Kaifu	New Conservative	
2003	Toshiki Kaifu	New Conservative	
2005	Toshiki Kaifu	LDP	
2009	Mitsunori Okamoto	Democratic	
2012	Yasumasa Nagasaka	LDP	
2014	Yasumasa Nagasaka	LDP	
2017	Yasumasa Nagasaka	LDP	
2021	Yasumasa Nagasaka	LDP	
2024	Mitsunori Okamoto	CDP	
2026	Yasumasa Nagasaka	LDP	

== Election results ==
=== 2026 ===
2026
Party	Candidate	Votes	%	±%
LDP	Yasumasa Nagasaka	93,351	45.1	▲3.6
Centrist Reform	Mitsunori Okamoto	58.084	28.1	▼19.8
Ishin	Nana Uragami	24,489	11.8	
Sanseitō	Taichi Katō	22,098	10.7	
JCP	Keiko Itō	8,930	4.3	▼6.2
Registered electors		374,810		
Turnout			56.11	▲4.10
LDP gain from Centrist Reform				

=== 2024 ===
2024
Party	Candidate	Votes	%	±%
CDP	Mitsunori Okamoto	91,152	48.03	
LDP	Yasumasa Nagasaka (incumbent) (won PR seat)	78,726	41.48	
JCP	Keiko Ito	19,899	10.49	N/A
Majority		12,426	6.55	
Registered electors		377,902		
Turnout			52.01	▼1.97
CDP gain from LDP				

=== 2021 ===
2021
Party	Candidate	Votes	%	±%
Liberal Democratic (endorsed by Komeito)	Yasumasa Nagasaka (incumbent)	120,213	52.74	
CDP	Mitsunori Okamoto (PR seat incumbent)	107,722	47.26	New
Majority		12,491	5.48	
Registered electors		432,760		
Turnout			53.98	▲2.03
LDP hold				

=== 2017 ===
2017
Party	Candidate	Votes	%	±%
Liberal Democratic (endorsed by Komeito)	Yasumasa Nagasaka (incumbent)	104,419	47.50	
Kibō no Tō	Mitsunori Okamoto (PR seat incumbent) (won PR seat)	89,908	40.90	New
Communist	Hiroshi Watanabe	25,489	11.60	
Majority		14,511	6.60	
Registered electors		435,193		
Turnout			51.95	▲1.15
LDP hold				

=== 2014 ===
2014
Party	Candidate	Votes	%	±%
Liberal Democratic (endorsed by Komeito)	Yasumasa Nagasaka (incumbent)	98,594	47.27	
Democratic	Mitsunori Okamoto (won PR seat)	85,967	41.22	
Communist	Hiroshi Watanabe	24,003	11.51	
Majority		12,627	6.05	
Registered electors		424,434		
Turnout			50.80	▼7.20
LDP hold				

=== 2012 ===
2012
Party	Candidate	Votes	%	±%
Liberal Democratic (endorsed by Komeito)	Yasumasa Nagasaka	93,757	39.40	
Democratic (endorsed by PNP)	Mitsunori Okamoto (incumbent)	62,033	26.07	
Restoration (endorsed by Your)	Masayasu Nakano	46,739	19.64	New
Tomorrow (endorsed by Daichi)	Makoto Igeta	20,244	8.51	New
Communist	Shozo Matsuzaki	15,186	6.38	N/A
Majority		31,724	13.33	
Registered electors		423,038		
Turnout			58.00	▼12.30
LDP gain from Democratic				

=== 2009 ===
2009
Party	Candidate	Votes	%	±%
Democratic	Mitsunori Okamoto (PR seat incumbent)	180,609	62.42	
Liberal Democratic	Toshiki Kaifu (incumbent)	100,549	34.75	
Happiness Realization	Kimiko Itaya	8,200	2.83	New
Majority		80,060	27.67	
Registered electors		421,977		
Turnout			70.30	▲3.15
Democratic gain from LDP				

=== 2005 ===
2005
Party	Candidate	Votes	%	±%
Liberal Democratic	Toshiki Kaifu (incumbent)	130,771	47.66	N/A
Democratic	Mitsunori Okamoto (PR seat incumbent) (won PR seat)	110,809	40.38	
Communist	Shozo Matsuzaki	17,489	6.37	
People's New	Makoto Igeta	15,314	5.58	New
Majority		19,962	7.28	
Registered electors		417,340		
Turnout			67.15	▲9.26
LDP hold				

=== 2003 ===
2003
Party	Candidate	Votes	%	±%
New Conservative	Toshiki Kaifu (incumbent)	104,075	44.59	
Democratic	Mitsunori Okamoto (won PR seat)	92,554	39.65	
Independent	Makoto Igeta	20,565	8.81	New
Communist	Shozo Matsuzaki	16,213	6.95	
Majority		11,521	4.94	
Registered electors		414,797		
Turnout			57.89	
New Conservative hold				

=== 2000 ===
2000
Party	Candidate	Votes	%	±%
New Conservative	Toshiki Kaifu (incumbent)	122,175	53.16	New
Democratic	Yoshie Meguro	73,321	31.90	New
Communist	Shozo Matsuzaki	24,266	10.56	
Independent	Katsuyuki Ōmiya	6,117	2.66	New
Liberal League	Yoshiaki Yamazaki	3,936	1.71	New
Majority		48,854	21.26	
Turnout				
New Conservative hold				

=== 1996 ===
1996
Party	Candidate	Votes	%	±%
New Frontier	Toshiki Kaifu	111,578	47.68	New
Liberal Democratic	Hiroshi Yoshikawa	58,059	24.81	New
Democratic	Kanju Sato	42,393	18.12	New
Communist	Shizuo Hibi	20,290	8.67	New
Culture Forum	Reiko Yasuda	921	0.39	New
Independent	Tadanori Ōi	422	0.18	New
People's Party	Sakae Shirai	338	0.14	New
Majority		53,519	22.87	
Turnout				
New Frontier win (new seat)				
