= Aichi 2nd district =

Legislative district of Japan

- Parliamentary constituency for the Japanese House of Representatives

- Numbered map of Aichi Prefecture single-member districts
- Prefecture: Aichi
- Proportional District: Tokai
- Electorate: 404,762

Current constituency
- Created: 1994
- Seats: One
- Party: DPP
- Representative: Motohisa Furukawa
- Municipalities: Chikusa-ku, Moriyama-ku and Meitō-ku of Nagoya City.

Aichi 2nd district (愛知県第2区, Aichi-ken dai-niku or simply 愛知2区, Aichi niku) is a single-member constituency of the House of Representatives in the national Diet of Japan located in Aichi Prefecture.

== Areas covered ==
=== since 1994 ===
- Nagoya City
  - Chikusa-ku
  - Moriyama-ku
  - Meitō-ku

== List of representatives ==
Election	Representative	Party	Notes
1996	Hiroyuki Aoki	New Frontier	
1996	Hiroyuki Aoki	Liberal	
1996	Hiroyuki Aoki	New Conservative	
2000	Motohisa Furukawa	Democratic	
2003	Motohisa Furukawa	Democratic	
2005	Motohisa Furukawa	Democratic	
2009	Motohisa Furukawa	Democratic	
2012	Motohisa Furukawa	Democratic	
2014	Motohisa Furukawa	Democratic	
2014	Motohisa Furukawa	Democratic	
2017	Motohisa Furukawa	Kibō no Tō	
2021	Motohisa Furukawa	DPP	
2024	Motohisa Furukawa	DPP	
2026	Motohisa Furukawa	DPP	

== Election results ==
=== 2026 ===
2026
Party	Candidate	Votes	%	±%
DPP	Motohisa Furukawa	110,540	49.1	▼9.5
LDP	Hideki Tsuji (elected in Tōkai PR block)	74,845	33.3	▲9.1
Genzei–Yukoku	Tadashi Umemura	24,158	10.7	
JCP	Kentarō Sakai	15,550	6.9	▼1.5
Registered electors		404,338		
Turnout			57.21	▲4.47
DPP hold				

=== 2024 ===
2024
Party	Candidate	Votes	%	±%
DPP	Motohisa Furukawa (incumbent)	121,739	58.50	▼3.83
Liberal Democratic (endorsed by Komeito)	Takamoto Nakagawa	50,195	24.10	▼13.57
Innovation	Koji Murozono	18,864	9.10	New
Communist	Kentaro Sakai	17,422	8.40	New
Majority		71,544	34.40	
Registered electors		403,794		
Turnout			52.74	▼0.70
DPP hold				

=== 2021 ===
2021
Party	Candidate	Votes	%	±%
DPP	Motohisa Furukawa (incumbent)	131,397	62.33	New
Liberal Democratic (endorsed by Komeito)	Takamoto Nakagawa (won PR seat)	79,418	37.67	
Majority		51,979	24.66	
Registered electors		404,436		
Turnout			53.44	▲2.78
DPP hold				

=== 2017 ===
2017
Party	Candidate	Votes	%	±%
Kibō no Tō	Motohisa Furukawa (incumbent)	99,520	50.13	New
Liberal Democratic (endorsed by Komeito)	Tsuyoshi Tabata (PR seat incumbent) (won PR seat)	71,600	36.06	
Communist	Kentaro Sakai	27,423	13.81	
Majority		27,920	14.07	
Registered electors		401,957		
Turnout			50.66	▼0.49
Kibō no Tō hold				

=== 2014 ===
2014
Party	Candidate	Votes	%	±%
Democratic	Motohisa Furukawa (incumbent)	102,058	52.92	
Liberal Democratic (endorsed by Komeito)	Tetsuya Tōgō (PR seat incumbent)	67,681	35.09	
Communist	Jiro Kuroda	23,128	11.99	
Majority		34,377	17.83	
Registered electors		387,954		
Turnout			51.15	▼5.65
Democratic hold				

=== 2012 ===
2012
Party	Candidate	Votes	%	±%
Democratic (endorsed by PNP)	Motohisa Furukawa (incumbent)	94,058	44.77	
Liberal Democratic (endorsed by Komeito)	Tetsuya Tōgō (won PR seat)	67,086	31.93	
Tomorrow (endorsed by Daichi)	Satoshi Mano	31,974	15.22	New
Communist	Jiro Kuroda	16,991	8.09	
Majority		26,972	12.84	
Registered electors		383,295		
Turnout			56.80	▼8.80
Democratic hold				

=== 2009 ===
2009
Party	Candidate	Votes	%	±%
Democratic	Motohisa Furukawa (incumbent)	162,237	66.61	
Liberal Democratic	Misako Miyahara	58,225	23.91	
Communist	Aiko Saito	18,908	7.76	
Happiness Realization	Akira Ishida	4,187	1.72	New
Majority		104,012	42.70	
Registered electors		378,272		
Turnout			65.60	▲3.02
Democratic hold				

=== 2005 ===
2005
Party	Candidate	Votes	%	±%
Democratic	Motohisa Furukawa (incumbent)	116,884	52.00	
Liberal Democratic	Yuji Okada	87,804	39.06	
Communist	Aiko Saito	20,077	8.93	
Majority		29,080	12.94	
Registered electors		366,121		
Turnout			62.58	▲8.61
Democratic hold				

=== 2003 ===
2003
Party	Candidate	Votes	%	±%
Democratic	Motohisa Furukawa (incumbent)	115,674	61.01	
Liberal Democratic	Yukio Saito	56,472	29.79	
Communist	Soramitsu Ohno	17,437	9.20	
Majority		59,202	31.22	
Registered electors		361,222		
Turnout			53.97	
Democratic hold				

=== 2000 ===
2000
Party	Candidate	Votes	%	±%
Democratic	Motohisa Furukawa (PR seat incumbent)	91,888	47.61	New
Liberal Democratic	Moriyuki Taniguchi	47,269	24.49	
New Conservative	Hiroyuki Aoki (incumbent)	25,576	13.25	New
Communist	Soramitsu Ohno	24,847	12.87	
Liberal League	Zenko Ono	1,832	0.95	
Independent	Kimio Ōe	1,579	0.82	New
Majority		44,619	23.12	
Turnout				
Democratic gain from New Conservative				

=== 1996 ===
1996
Party	Candidate	Votes	%	±%
New Frontier	Hiroyuki Aoki	56,101	32.94	New
Liberal Democratic	Hiroo Tanabe	44,938	26.38	New
Democratic	Motohisa Furukawa (won PR seat)	43,804	25.72	New
Communist	Junichi Ishiyama	21,337	12.53	New
Liberal League	Michiko Fujiwara	2,670	1.57	New
Culture Forum	Kazuki Ishikawa	701	0.41	New
Independent	Yoichi Matsumura	418	0.25	New
People's Party	Yoshiaki Yamazaki	348	0.20	New
Majority		11,163	6.56	
Turnout				
New Frontier win (new seat)				
