= Kumamoto 2nd district =

Legislative district of Japan

Kumamoto 2nd District
- 熊本県第2区
- Parliamentary constituency for the Japanese House of Representatives
- Proportional District: Kyushu
- Electorate: 313,172 (as of September 2022)

Current constituency
- Created: 1994
- Seats: One
- Party: LDP

Kumamoto 2nd District (熊本県第2区, Kumamoto-ken dai-ni-ku; or 熊本2区 Kumamoto ni-ku) is a current single-member electoral district for the House of Representatives, the lower house of the National Diet of Japan. It is located in Kumamoto and covers South Ward (Minami-ku) and West Ward (Nishi-ku) of the prefectural capital Kumamoto City, the cities of Arao and Tamana and the Tamana District (the towns of Nagasu, Nankan, Nagomi and Gyokutō). As of September 2022, 313,172 eligible voters were resident in the district.

Before 1996, the area had been part of the five-member Kumamoto 1st district. Liberal Democrat Takeshi Noda, had represented the pre-reform 1st district since 1972 when he succeeded his deceased father-in-law Takeo Noda.

== List of representatives ==
Representative	Party	Dates	Notes
Takeshi Noda	NFP	1996 – 2000	Joined LP in the NFP dissolution, CP in the LP split
Takeshi Noda	NCP	2000 – 2003	Did not join the NCP, but returned directly to the LDP; alternating LDP candidacy (Costa Rica method) in the district with Hayashida, re-elected by PR (Kyūshū) in 2003
Takeshi Hayashida	LDP	2003 – 2005	Moved to Kyūshū PR (Costa Rica method) in 2005 and re-elected
Takeshi Noda	LDP	2005 – 2009	Moved to Kyūshū PR (Costa Rica method) in 2009 and re-elected
Ken'ichirō Fukushima	DPJ	2009 – 2012	Joined LF, then TPJ in 2012, failed re-election by PR
Takeshi Noda	LDP	2012– 2021	Defeated in the 2021 general election
Daisuke Nishino	Indep.	2021	Joined the LDP in 2021
Daisuke Nishino	LDP	2021 –	Joined the LDP in 2021

== Election results ==
2026
Party	Candidate	Votes	%	±%
LDP	Daisuke Nishino	115,583	71.5	▲2.2
Sanseitō	Tomonori Maeda	31,019	19.2	▲1.7
JCP	Makiko Masuda	15,165	9.4	▼3.8
Turnout			54.90	▲4.80
LDP hold				

2024
Party	Candidate	Votes	%	±%
LDP	Daisuke Nishino	102,624	69.3	▲8.7
Sanseitō	Akane Konda	25,944	17.5	New
JCP	Konomi Okuda	19,469	13.2	▲6.9
Turnout			50.10	▼8.57
LDP hold				

2021
Party	Candidate	Votes	%	±%
Independent	Daisuke Nishino	110,310	60.6	▲26.1
LDP	Takeshi Noda	60,091	33.0	▼14.5
JCP	Yoshiaki Hashida	11,521	6.3	
Turnout			58.67	▲0.14
Independent gain from LDP				

2017
Party	Candidate	Votes	%	±%
LDP	Takeshi Noda	86,027	47.5	▼23.9
Independent	Daisuke Nishino	62,575	34.5	
Social Democratic	Kaname Wada	26,074	14.4	
Happiness Realization	Junko Kinoshita	6,495	3.6	
Turnout			58.53	▲12.51
LDP hold				

2014
Party	Candidate	Votes	%	±%
LDP	Takeshi Noda	92,873	71.6	▲18.1
JCP	Yumi Hirose	36,769	28.4	▲24.6
Turnout		303,272	46.02	▼10.44
LDP hold				

2012
Party	Candidate	Votes	%	±%
LDP	Takeshi Noda	88,744	53.5	former
Your	Akiko Honda	33,283	20.1	new
Democratic	Daizō Hamada	25,891	15.6	new
Tomorrow	Ken'ichirō Fukushima	11,520	6.9	−43.5
JCP	Kunio Matsuyama	6,358	3.8	new
Turnout			56.46	
LDP gain from Democratic				

2009
Party	Candidate	Votes	%	±%
Democratic	Ken'ichirō Fukushima	104,876	50.4	new
LDP	Takeshi Hayashida	99,933	48.0	former
Happiness Realization	Ken'ichi Magōri	3,354	1.6	new
Turnout				
Democratic gain from LDP				

2005
Party	Candidate	Votes	%	±%
LDP	Takeshi Noda	112,549	55.8	former
Democratic	Nobuo Matsuno	79,793	39.6	−2.2
JCP	Tetsuo Ueno	9,432	4.7	new
Turnout				
LDP hold				

2003
Party	Candidate	Votes	%	±%
LDP	Takeshi Hayashida	95,233	52.7	former
Democratic	Nobuo Matsuno (won PR seat)	75,517	41.8	+13.0
JCP	Masaharu Maeda	9,829	5.4	new
Turnout				
LDP gain from New Conservative				

2000
Party	Candidate	Votes	%	±%
New Conservative	Takeshi Noda	106,129	60.4	+10.2
Democratic	Nobuo Matsuno	50,604	28.8	new
JCP	Nobuhiro Yamamoto	11,644	6.6	new
Liberal League	Kayoko Takano	7,375	4.2	new
Turnout				
New Conservative gain from New Frontier				

1996
Party	Candidate	Votes	%	±%
New Frontier	Takeshi Noda	97,242.993	50.2	N/A
LDP	Takeshi Hayashida	79,249.997	40.9	N/A
JCP	Takehiro Tateishi	8,983	4.6	N/A
New Socialist	Takashi Kurihara	8,393	4.3	N/A
Turnout				
New Frontier win (new seat)				

Note: The decimals stem from anbunhyō ("proportional fractional votes"), see Elections in Japan#Ballots, voting machines and early voting. As Takeshi (彪) Hayashida and Takeshi (毅) Noda have different Kanji for their given names, some voters must have voted for just "Takeshi" in Kana for the votes to be ambiguous.
