= Aichi 4th district =

Legislative district of Japan

- Parliamentary constituency for the Japanese House of Representatives

- Numbered map of Aichi Prefecture single-member districts
- Prefecture: Aichi
- Proportional District: Tokai
- Electorate: 369,899

Current constituency
- Created: 1994
- Seats: One
- Party: LDP
- Representative: Shōzō Kudō
- Municipalities: Mizuho-ku, Atsuta-ku, Minato-ku and Minami-ku of Nagoya City

Aichi 4th district (愛知県第4区, Aichi-ken dai-yonku or simply 愛知4区, Aichi-ken yonku) is a single-member constituency of the House of Representatives in the national Diet of Japan located in Aichi Prefecture.

== Areas covered ==
=== since 2002 ===
- Nagoya City
  - Mizuho-ku
  - Atsuta-ku
  - Minato-ku
  - Minami-ku

=== 1994-2002 ===
- Nagoya City
  - Mizuho-ku
  - Minato-ku
  - Minami-ku

== List of representatives ==
Election	Representative	Party	Notes
1996	Jun Misawa	New Frontier	
1996	Jun Misawa	Liberal	
1996	Jun Misawa	New Conservative	
2000	Yoshio Maki	Democratic	
2003	Yoshio Maki	Democratic	
2005	Yoshio Maki	Democratic	
2009	Yoshio Maki	Democratic	
2009	Yoshio Maki	People's Life First	
2009	Yoshio Maki	Tomorrow	
2012	Shōzō Kudō	LDP	
2014	Shōzō Kudō	LDP	
2017	Shōzō Kudō	LDP	
2021	Shōzō Kudō	LDP	
2024	Yoshio Maki	CDP	
2026	Shōzō Kudō	LDP	

== Election results ==
=== 2026 ===
2026
Party	Candidate	Votes	%	±%
LDP	Shōzō Kudō	79,204	41.7	▲10.6
Centrist Reform	Yoshio Maki	50,572	26.6	▼9.8
Sanseitō	Kana Uozumi	17,699	9.3	
Genzei–Yukoku	Yasuhiro Shimura	17.400	9.2	
Ishin	Chiyo Nakata	14,831	7.8	▼5.1
JCP	Yūsuke Takahashi	10,286	5.4	▼2.9
Registered electors		365,094		
Turnout			52.81	▲4.03
LDP gain from Centrist Reform				

=== 2024 ===
2024
Party	Candidate	Votes	%	±%
CDP	Yoshio Maki	63,668	36.4	▼4.4
LDP	Shōzō Kudō (elected in Tōkai PR)	54,385	31.1	▼12.6
Ishin	Chiyo Nakata	22,661	13.0	▼2.6
CPJ	Chisa Azō	19,805	11.3	
JCP	Yūsuke Takahashi	14,453	8.3	
Registered electors		367,462		
Turnout			48.78	▼0.17
CDP gain from LDP				

=== 2021 ===
2021
Party	Candidate	Votes	%	±%
Liberal Democratic (endorsed by Komeito)	Shozo Kudo (incumbent)	78,004	43.72	
CDP	Yoshio Maki (PR seat incumbent) (won PR seat)	72,786	40.79	New
Innovation	Chiyo Nakata	27,640	15.49	New
Majority		5,218	2.93	
Registered electors		372,310		
Turnout			48.95	▲2.41
LDP hold				

=== 2017 ===
2017
Party	Candidate	Votes	%	±%
Liberal Democratic (endorsed by Komeito)	Shozo Kudo (incumbent)	76,446	45.09	
Kibō no Tō	Yoshio Maki (PR seat incumbent) (won PR seat)	63,207	37.28	New
Communist	Toshiko Nishida	29,885	17.63	
Majority		13,239	7.81	
Registered electors		376,367		
Turnout			46.54	▼1.24
LDP hold				

=== 2014 ===
2014
Party	Candidate	Votes	%	±%
Liberal Democratic (endorsed by Komeito)	Shozo Kudo (incumbent)	66,213	38.58	
Innovation	Yoshio Maki (won PR seat)	47,291	27.56	New
Democratic	Katsuyuki Tone	36,285	21.14	
Communist	Yusuke Takahashi	21,828	12.72	
Majority		18,922	11.02	
Registered electors		369,566		
Turnout			47.78	▼4.49
LDP hold				

=== 2012 ===
2012
Party	Candidate	Votes	%	±%
Liberal Democratic (endorsed by Komeito)	Shozo Kudo	63,932	34.03	
Tomorrow (endorsed by Daichi)	Yoshio Maki (incumbent)	41,730	22.21	New
Restoration (endorsed by Your)	Yoichi Yamamoto	33,144	17.64	New
Democratic	Katsuyuki Tone	30,731	16.36	
Communist	Toshiko Nishida	18,351	9.77	
Majority		22,202	11.82	
Registered electors		371,031		
Turnout			52.27	▼9.43
LDP gain from Tomorrow				

=== 2009 ===
2009
Party	Candidate	Votes	%	±%
Democratic	Yoshio Maki (incumbent)	129,382	57.33	
Liberal Democratic	Makiko Fujino (PR seat incumbent)	64,367	28.52	
Communist	Yukiko Seko	28,826	12.77	
Happiness Realization	Toshikazu Imaida	3,086	1.37	New
Majority		65,015	28.81	
Registered electors		373,755		
Turnout			61.70	▲1.57
Democratic hold				

=== 2005 ===
2005
Party	Candidate	Votes	%	±%
Democratic	Yoshio Maki (incumbent)	95,844	43.85	
Liberal Democratic	Makiko Fujino (won PR seat)	87,324	39.95	
Communist	Yukiko Seko	30,622	14.01	
Independent	Kenji Sasaki	4,791	2.19	New
Majority		8,520	3.90	
Registered electors		372,236		
Turnout			60.13	▲6.58
Democratic hold				

=== 2003 ===
2003
Party	Candidate	Votes	%	±%
Democratic	Yoshio Maki (incumbent)	84,919	44.03	
Liberal Democratic	Hiroshi Kondō (won PR seat)	79,749	41.35	N/A
Communist	Yukiko Seko (PR seat incumbent)	28,193	14.62	
Majority		5,170	2.68	
Registered electors		369,895		
Turnout			53.55	
Democratic hold				

=== 2000 ===
2000
Party	Candidate	Votes	%	±%
Democratic	Yoshio Maki	57,760	35.10	New
New Conservative	Jun Misawa (incumbent)	54,071	32.86	New
Communist	Yukiko Seko (PR seat incumbent) (won PR seat)	37,645	22.88	
Social Democratic	Masakazu Kobayashi	10,167	6.18	New
Liberal League	Minoru Kawashima	4,919	2.99	New
Majority		3,689	2.24	
Turnout				
Democratic gain from New Conservative				

=== 1996 ===
1996
Party	Candidate	Votes	%	±%
New Frontier	Jun Misawa	57,361	35.73	New
Liberal Democratic	Saburo Tsukamoto	48,209	30.03	New
Communist	Yukiko Seko (won PR seat)	30,976	19.29	New
Democratic	Koji Takagi	23,411	14.58	New
People's Party	Takayoshi Ito	348	0.22	New
Culture Forum	Toshinao Shiokawa	243	0.15	New
Majority		9,152	5.70	
Turnout				
New Frontier win (new seat)				
