= Yasumasa Nagasaka =

Japanese politician

- 長坂 康正
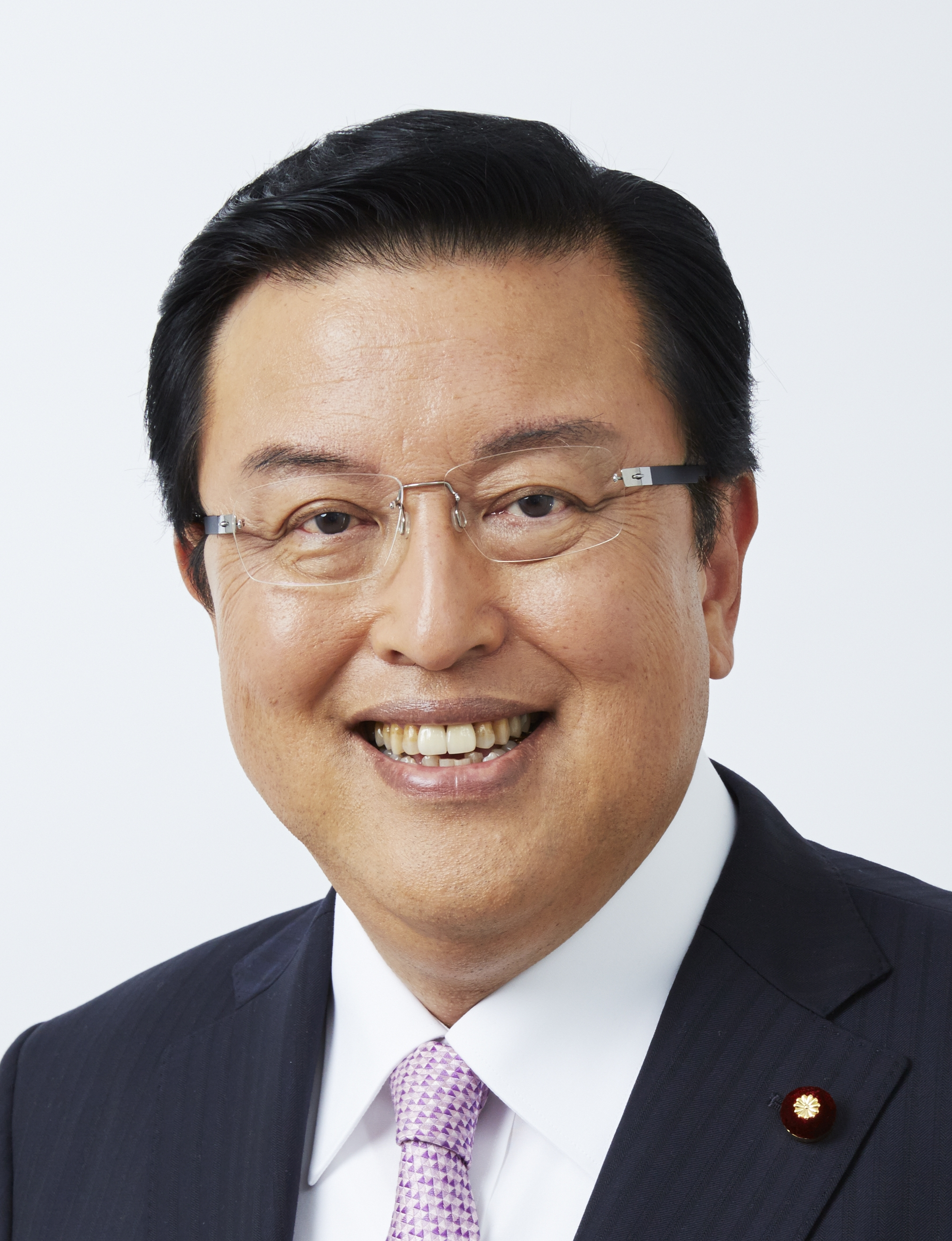
- Official portrait, 2015

Member of the House of Representatives
- Incumbent
- Assumed office 17 December 2012
- Preceded by: Mitsunori Okamoto
- Constituency: Aichi 9th (2012–2024); Tōkai PR (2024–2026); Aichi 9th (2026–present)

Member of the Aichi Prefectural Assembly
- In office 22 May 1994 – 30 November 2012
- Constituency: Ichinomiya

Personal details
- Born: 10 April 1957 (age 69) Bisai, Aichi, Japan
- Party: Liberal Democratic (Shikōkai)
- Education: Aoyama Gakuin University
- Website: Yasumasa Nagasaka website

Yasumasa Nagasaka (長坂 康正, Nagasaka Yasumasa; born 10 April 1957) is a Japanese politician of the Liberal Democratic Party, who serves as a member of the House of Representatives.

== Early years ==
In 1957, Nagasaka was born in Bisai, Aichi Prefecture.

In March 1980, he graduated from Aoyama Gakuin University's Faculty of Economics and in April became a secretary to House of Representatives member Toshiki Kaifu.

In 1989, Kaifu, who Nagasaka served as a secretary, was elected Prime Minister, and he became PM's Secretary at the PM's Office.

== Political career ==
In 1991, Nagasaka ran for the Aichi Prefectural Assembly as an independent and lost to LDP Incumbent.

In 1992, Nagasaka ran as an independent in Aichi Prefecture Assembly by-election but lost.

In 1994, Nagasaka ran as a LDP candidate in Aichi Prefecture Assembly by-election and won.

Nagasaka resigned as a member of the Aichi Prefectural Assembly and ran for Aichi 9th district as Kaifu's successor in the 2012 general election. As a result, he defeated DPJ Incumbent Mitsunori Okamoto and gain Aichi 9th's seat.

In the 2014 general election, Nagasaka defeated Okamoto (DPJ) after a close race and hold the seat.

On 9 March 2017, Nagasaka was appointed to Parliamentary Vice-Minister of Cabinet Office and Parliamentary Vice-Minister for Reconstruction because of the resignation of Shunsuke Mutai. He was re-appointed in the Third Abe Third reshuffled cabinet.

In the 2017 general election, Nagasaka defeated Kibō’s Okamoto after a close race and hold the seat. After the election, he was re-appointed to Parliamentary Vice-Minister of Cabinet Office and Parliamentary Vice-Minister for Reconstruction in the Fourth Abe cabinet.

In 2020, Nagasaka was appointed to State Minister of Economy, Trade and Industry and State Minister of Cabinet Office in the Suga cabinet.

In the 2021 general election, Nagasaka defeated CDP’s Okamoto after a close race and hold the seat.

In the 2024 LDP presidential election, Nagasaka endorsed Taro Kono as a recommender.

In the 2024 general election, Nagasaka lost to CDP's Okamoto and won a seat in Tōkai PR.

In 2025, Nagasaka was appointed to State Minister of Health, Labour and Welfare in the First Takaichi cabinet.

In the 2026 general election, Nagasaka defeated CRA's Okamoto and regain Aichi 9th's seat. After the election, he was re-appointed to State Minister of Health, Labour and Welfare in the Second Takaichi cabinet.
