= Jun Misawa =

Japanese baseball player and politician (1952–2022)

- 三沢 淳

Member of the House of Representatives
- In office 21 October 1996 – 2 June 2000
- Preceded by: Constituency established
- Succeeded by: Yoshio Maki
- Constituency: Aichi 4th

Personal details
- Born: 1 October 1952 Hamada, Shimane, Japan
- Died: 3 March 2022 (aged 69) Nagoya, Aichi, Japan
- Party: New Conservative (2000–2003)
- Other political affiliations: New Frontier (1996–1998); Liberal (1998–2000)
- Education: Gōtsu Technical High School
- Occupation: Baseball player

Jun Misawa (Japanese: 三沢 淳 Misawa Jun; 1 October 1952 – 3 March 2022) was a Japanese baseball player and politician.

A member of the New Frontier Party, the Liberal Party, and the New Conservative Party, he served in the House of Representatives from 1996 to 2000.

Misawa died in Nagoya on 3 March 2022, at the age of 69.
