= Takeshi Hayashida =

Japanese politician

- 林田 彪
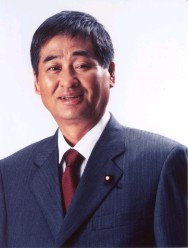
- Official portrait, 2004

Member of the House of Representatives
- In office 16 December 2012 – 21 November 2014
- Constituency: Kyushu PR
- In office 6 July 1999 – 21 July 2009
- Preceded by: Yoshiyuki Tōya
- Succeeded by: Takeshi Noda
- Constituency: Kyushu PR (1999–2003); Kumamoto 2nd (2003–2005); Kyushu PR (2005–2009)

Personal details
- Born: 4 April 1944 (age 82) Nagasu, Kumamoto, Japan
- Party: Liberal Democratic
- Education: Tokyo University of Agriculture and Technology

Takeshi Hayashida (林田 彪, Hayashida Takeshi; born 1944) is a former Japanese politician of the Liberal Democratic Party (LDP), who served as a member of the House of Representatives in the Diet (national legislature). A native of Nagasu, Kumamoto and graduate of Tokyo University of Agriculture and Technology he joined the Ministry of Construction in 1967. Leaving the ministry, he was elected to the House of Representatives for the first time in 1996. He represented the 2nd District of Kumamoto Prefecture.
