= Nagasu =

Nagasu (Japanese: 長洲) may refer to:

- Nagasu, Kumamoto
- Mirai Nagasu, American figure skater
