= Toshiki Kaifu =

Prime Minister of Japan from 1989 to 1991

- 海部 俊樹
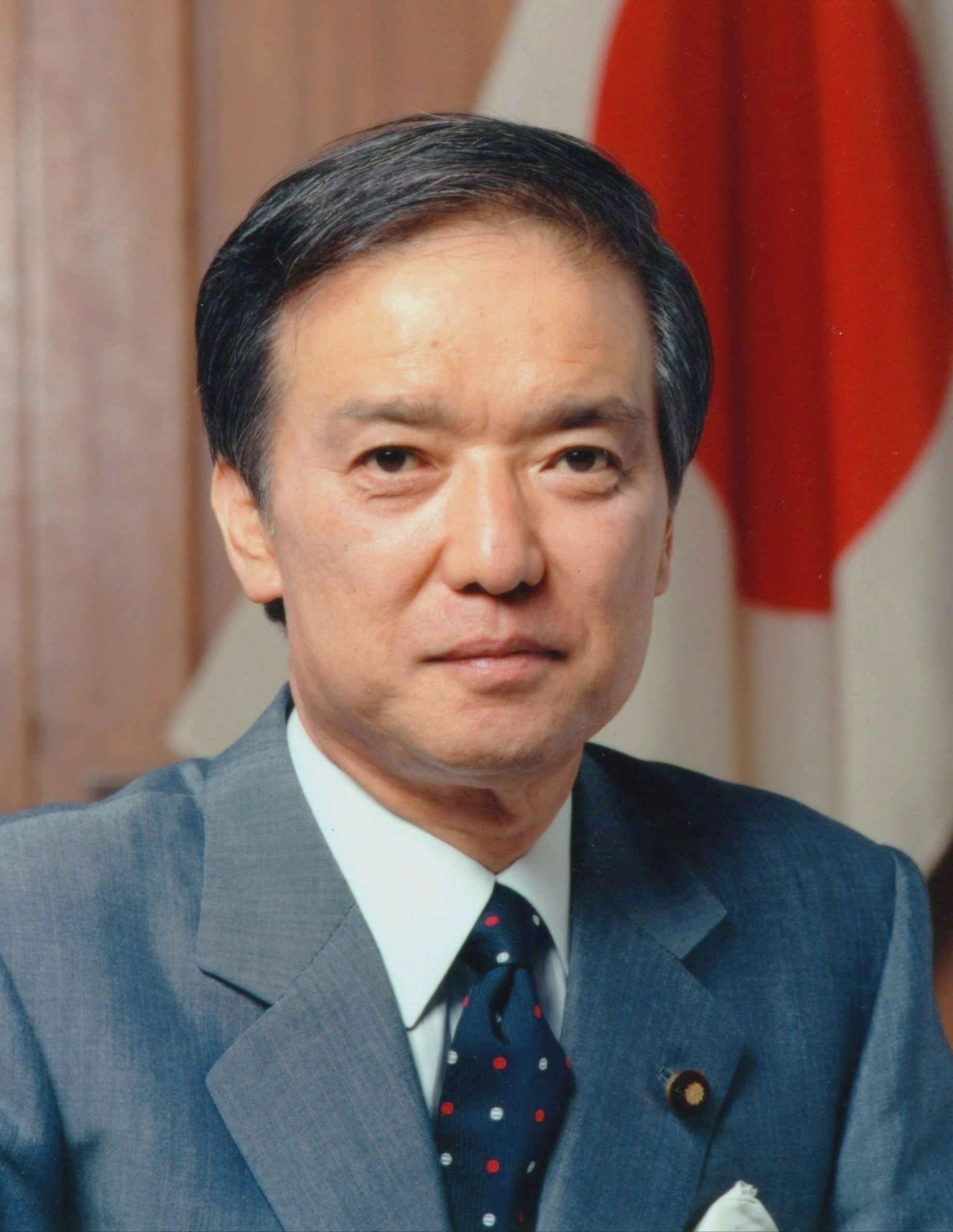
- Official portrait, 1989

Prime Minister of Japan
- In office 10 August 1989 – 5 November 1991
- Monarch: Akihito
- Preceded by: Sōsuke Uno
- Succeeded by: Kiichi Miyazawa

President of the Liberal Democratic Party
- In office 8 August 1989 – 30 October 1991
- Secretary-General: Ichirō Ozawa; Keizō Obuchi
- Preceded by: Sōsuke Uno
- Succeeded by: Kiichi Miyazawa

President of the New Frontier Party
- In office 8 December 1994 – 28 December 1995
- Preceded by: Position established
- Succeeded by: Ichirō Ozawa

Minister of Education
- In office 28 December 1985 – 22 July 1986
- Prime Minister: Yasuhiro Nakasone
- Preceded by: Hikaru Matsunaga
- Succeeded by: Masayuki Fujio
- In office 24 December 1976 – 28 November 1977
- Prime Minister: Takeo Fukuda
- Preceded by: Michio Nagai
- Succeeded by: Shigetami Sunada

Deputy Chief Cabinet Secretary (Political affairs)
- In office 9 December 1974 – 15 September 1976
- Prime Minister: Takeo Miki
- Preceded by: Seiroku Kajiyama
- Succeeded by: Hyōsuke Kujiraoka

Member of the House of Representatives
- In office 20 November 1960 – 21 July 2009
- Preceded by: Takako Kōno
- Succeeded by: Mitsunori Okamoto
- Constituency: Aichi 3rd (1960–1996); Aichi 9th (1996–2009)

Personal details
- Born: 2 January 1931 Nagoya, Japan
- Died: 9 January 2022 (aged 91) Tokyo, Japan
- Party: Liberal Democratic (1960–1994; 2003–2022)
- Other political affiliations: New Frontier (1994–1997); Independent (1997–1998); Liberal (1998–2000); New Conservative (2000–2003)
- Spouse: Sachiyo Yanagihara (m. 1955)
- Children: 2
- Education: Chuo University; Waseda University
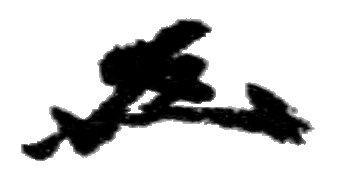
- Signature

Toshiki Kaifu (海部 俊樹, Kaifu Toshiki; 2 January 1931 – 9 January 2022) was a Japanese politician who served as prime minister of Japan from 1989 to 1991.

Born in Nagoya, Kaifu graduated from Waseda University and was first elected to the Diet in 1960 as a member of the Liberal Democratic Party. He served as education minister from 1976 to 1977 under Takeo Fukuda, and from 1985 to 1986 under Yasuhiro Nakasone. In 1989, Kaifu became prime minister after the resignations of the last two premiers, Noboru Takeshita and Sosuke Uno, amid various scandals; he was chosen in part because of his clean image. During his tenure, Kaifu worked to improve relations with China and made large financial contributions to the coalition in the Persian Gulf War. After his attempts at political reform were unsuccessful, Kaifu resigned as prime minister in 1991 and was replaced by Kiichi Miyazawa.

== Early life and education ==
Kaifu was born on 2 January 1931, in Nagoya City, the eldest of six brothers. His family's business Nakamura Photo Studio was established by his grandfather in the Meiji era, and was situated next to the Matsuzakaya flagship department store.

Kaifu took the exam to the Aichi Prefectural Asahigaoka Senior High School, and while of the eleven students who took the test from the same school, nine were accepted and two, including Kaifu, were not. As part of the student labor mobilization during the war, he was placed in a Mitsui Heavy Industry factory where he assembled airplane engine parts day and night. In 1945, he was accepted in the Youth Airman Academy of the Imperial Japanese Army, but the war ended before his planned enrollment in October. He was then educated at Chuo University and Waseda University.

== Political career ==
A member of the Liberal Democratic Party (LDP), Kaifu ran successfully for the 1960 Japanese general election and took office as the youngest member of the National Diet. He served for sixteen terms, totaling 48 years.

Kaifu served as education minister before rising to lead the party after the resignations of Noboru Takeshita and Sōsuke Uno. Facing Yoshiro Hayashi and Shintaro Ishihara, Kaifu was elected on the platform of clean leadership. He became the 76th Prime Minister of Japan in August 1989.

== Premiership (1989–1991) ==
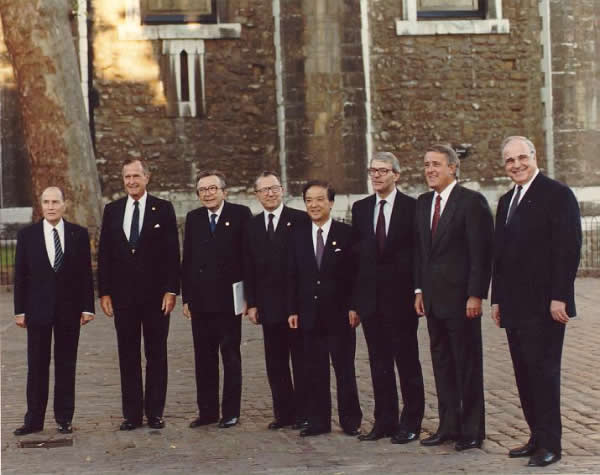
Kaifu (5th from left) with leaders of the G7 at the 17th G7 summit in London, 15 July 1991

On 10 August 1991, Kaifu became the first leader of a major country to make an official visit to China and break China's diplomatic isolation after the 1989 Tiananmen Square protests and massacre. Kaifu ended Japan's participation in economic sanctions against China and offered $949.9 million in loans and an additional $1.5 million in emergency aid following flood damage in southern China in June and July. In 1991 he sent the Maritime Self-Defense Force to the Persian Gulf in the wake of the Gulf War.

Throughout his two Cabinets, Kaifu's faction was too small to push through the reforms he sought, and the continuing repercussions of the Sagawa Express scandal caused problems. He resigned in November 1991 and was replaced by Kiichi Miyazawa.

In 1994, he left the LDP to become head of the newly-founded New Frontier Party. He was then nominated by Ichirō Ozawa and Tsutomu Hata as prime minister in June 1994 against the LDP-Socialist coalition candidate Tomiichi Murayama but lost in the Diet vote. He supported Ozawa's party until he returned to LDP in 2003. He was defeated in the election of 2009 by DPJ candidate Mitsunori Okamoto, which witnessed the end of almost uninterrupted LDP dominance since 1955. At the time of his defeat, he was the longest-serving member of the lower house of the Diet, and he was also the first former prime minister to be defeated at a re-election since 1963.

=== Economics ===
The economic policies of him and his predecessor are seen as part of the neoliberal cycle by Post keynesians.

== Later life ==
In June 1994, when the Liberal Democratic Party supported Socialist Party Chairman Tomiichi Murayama for Prime Minister to realise a coalition, Kaifu defected and became the joint candidate for the coalition who had supported the Hata Cabinet. He lost to Murayama in the nomination for prime minister. In December, the parties that had supported him merged into the New Frontier Party with Kaifu as president. He held the position for one year.

Kaifu died of pneumonia at a Tokyo hospital on 9 January 2022, at the age of 91. The announcement of his death to the media was delayed until 14 January.

== Personal life ==
On 17 November 1957, Kaifu married Sachiyo Yanagihara (born 30 April 1933), a female assistant to a Member of the House of Representatives. The couple had a son, Masaki, and a daughter, Mutsumi.

== Honours ==
- Grand Cross of the Order of the Sun of Peru (1989)

== Election history ==
Election	Age	District	Political party	Number of votes	election results
1960 Japanese general election	29	Aichi 3rd district	LDP	49,767	winning
1963 Japanese general election	32	Aichi 3rd district	LDP	57,586	winning
1967 Japanese general election	36	Aichi 3rd district	LDP	80,874	winning
1969 Japanese general election	38	Aichi 3rd district	LDP	82,695	winning
1972 Japanese general election	41	Aichi 3rd district	LDP	87,733	winning
1976 Japanese general election	45	Aichi 3rd district	LDP	151,151	winning
1979 Japanese general election	48	Aichi 3rd district	LDP	119,049	winning
1980 Japanese general election	49	Aichi 3rd district	LDP	145,322	winning
1983 Japanese general election	52	Aichi 3rd district	LDP	123,415	winning
1986 Japanese general election	55	Aichi 3rd district	LDP	133,829	winning
1990 Japanese general election	59	Aichi 3rd district	LDP	195,713	winning
1993 Japanese general election	62	Aichi 3rd district	LDP	194,863	winning
1996 Japanese general election	65	Aichi 9th district	NFP	111,578	winning
2000 Japanese general election	69	Aichi 9th district	NCP	122,175	winning
2003 Japanese general election	72	Aichi 9th district	NCP	104,075	winning
2005 Japanese general election	74	Aichi 9th district	LDP	130,771	winning
2009 Japanese general election	78	Aichi 9th district	LDP	100,549	lost

Party political offices
Preceded by Sosuke Uno	Director of Youth Division, Liberal Democratic Party; 1966	Succeeded by Takasaburo Naito
Preceded by Takasaburo Naito	Director of Youth Division, Liberal Democratic Party; 1968–1972	Succeeded by Takeo Nishioka
Preceded by Sosuke Uno	Chair of Diet Affairs Committee, Liberal Democratic Party; 1976	Succeeded by Shintaro Abe
Preceded by Sosuke Uno	President of the Liberal Democratic Party; 1989–1991	Succeeded by Kiichi Miyazawa
New title	Leader of the New Frontier Party; 1994–1995	Succeeded by Ichiro Ozawa
Political offices
Preceded by Seiroku Kajiyama	Deputy Chief Cabinet Secretary; 1974–1976	Succeeded by Hyosuke Kujiraoka
Preceded by Michio Nagai	Minister of Education; 1976–1977	Succeeded by Shigetami Sunada
Preceded by Hikaru Matsunaga	Minister of Education; 1985–1986	Succeeded by Masayuki Fujio
Preceded by Sōsuke Uno	Prime Minister of Japan; 1989–1991	Succeeded by Kiichi Miyazawa
Preceded by Ryutaro Hashimoto	Minister of Finance; 1991	Succeeded by Tsutomu Hata
Honorary titles
Preceded by Kazuo Tanikawa	Youngest member of the House of Representatives; 1960–1963	Succeeded by Ryutaro Hashimoto
