= Tetsuma Esaki =

Japanese politician

- 江﨑 鐵磨
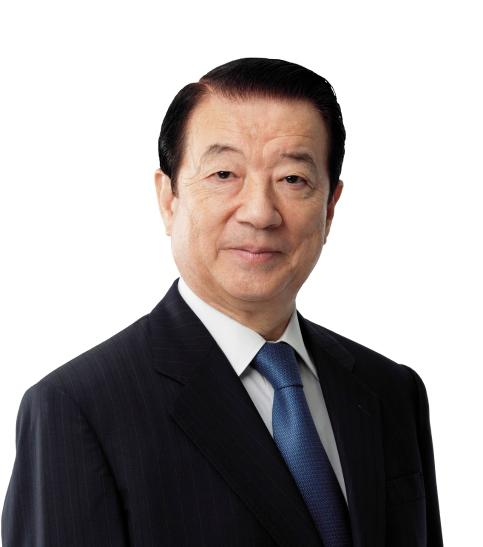
- Official portrait, 2017

Minister of State for Okinawa and Northern Territories Affairs Minister of State for Consumer Affairs and Food Safety
- In office 3 August 2017 – 27 February 2018
- Prime Minister: Shinzo Abe
- Preceded by: Yosuke Tsuruho
- Succeeded by: Teru Fukui

Member of the House of Representatives
- In office 18 December 2012 – 9 October 2024
- Preceded by: Kazumi Sugimoto
- Succeeded by: Norimasa Fujiwara
- Constituency: Aichi 10th
- In office 9 November 2003 – 21 July 2009
- Preceded by: Kanju Satō
- Succeeded by: Kazumi Sugimoto
- Constituency: Aichi 10th
- In office 19 July 1993 – 2 June 2000
- Preceded by: Masumi Esaki
- Succeeded by: Kanju Satō
- Constituency: Aichi 3rd (1993–1996); Aichi 10th (1996–2000)

Personal details
- Born: 17 September 1943 (age 83) Ichinomiya, Aichi, Japan
- Party: LDP (since 2003)
- Other political affiliations: JRP (1993–1994); NFP (1994–1997); LP (1998–2000); NCP (2000–2003)
- Parent: Masumi Esaki (father)
- Relatives: Yoichiro Esaki (brother)
- Education: Rikkyo University

Tetsuma Esaki (born 17 September 1943) is a former Japanese politician of the Liberal Democratic Party (LDP), who served as a member of the House of Representatives in the Diet (national legislature).

== Early life ==
Esaki is a native of Ichinomiya, Aichi and graduate of Rikkyo University.

== Political career ==
Esaki was elected for the first time in 1993 as a member of the now-defunct Japan Renewal Party. He later joined the LDP. He was defeated in the 2009 by DPJ candidate Kazumi Sugimoto.

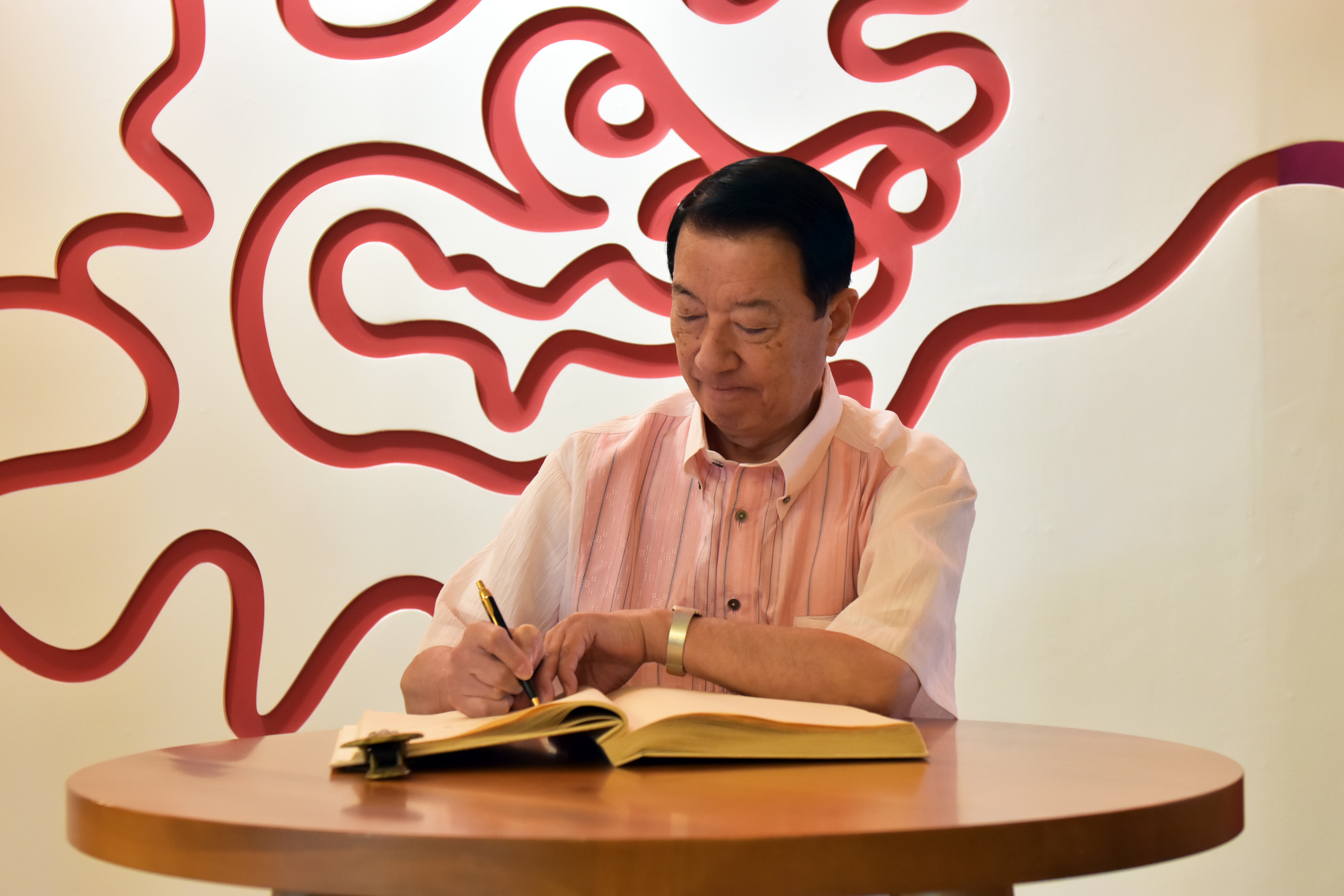
Esaki at Onna, Okinawa, 2017

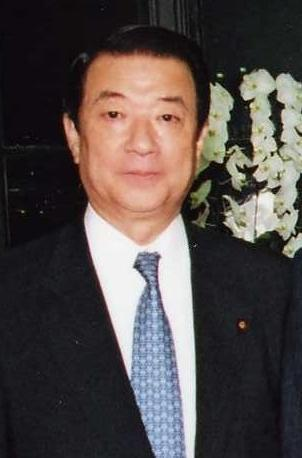
Tetsuma Esaki (2006).

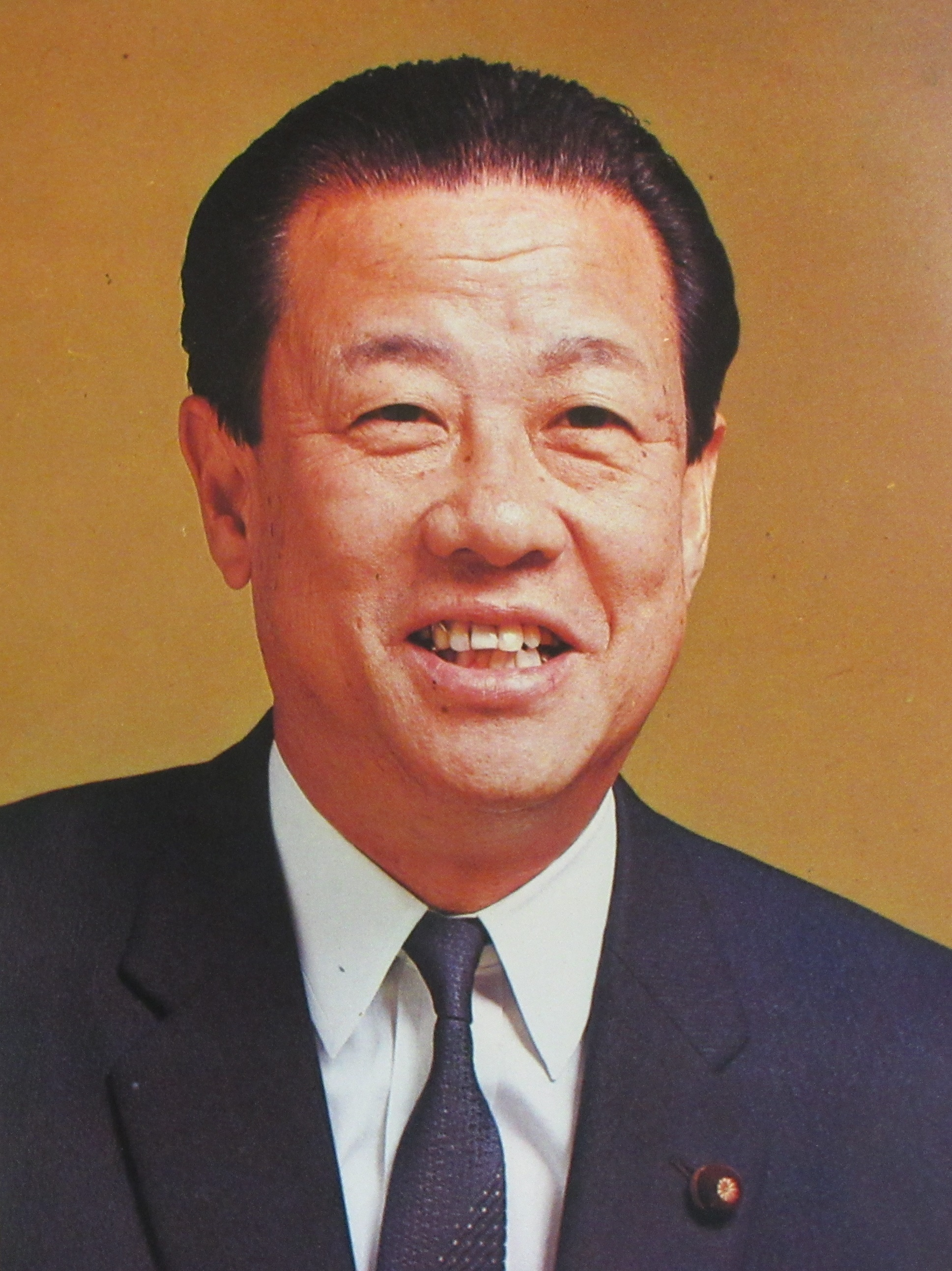
Masumi Esaki, Tetsuma's father

He was appointed to be the Minister of State for Okinawa and Northern Territories Affairs by Shinzō Abe August 3, 2017.

He also served as Minister for Consumer Affairs and Food Safety.

However, on February 27, 2018, He resigned from the minister due to a mild cerebral infarction. The next day, Teru Fukui, former vice Minister of Education, Culture, Sports, Science and Technology assumed office as a successor.

== Remarks ==
- On August 8, 2018, Esaki said that "the Japan-U.S. Status of Forces Agreement (SOFA) should be “re-examined” in light of the fatal crash off Australia of an Okinawa-based U.S. Marine Corps Osprey aircraft, likely overstepping Tokyo's official line on the politically sensitive pact."
- Masumi Esaki, Tetsuma's father, was a great politician. Masumi has served as Minister of Defense, Minister of Economy, Trade, and Industry, and Chairperson of the National Public Safety Commission.
