= Shinji Wakayama =

Japanese politician

- 若山 慎司
- Official portrait, 2025

Member of the House of Representatives
- Incumbent
- Assumed office 28 October 2024
- Preceded by: Multi-member district
- Constituency: Tokai PR (2024–2026); Aichi 10th (2026–present)

Personal details
- Born: 15 July 1973 (age 53) Gōdo, Gifu, Japan
- Party: Liberal Democratic
- Education: Ibaraki University
- Website: Shinji Wakayama website

Shinji Wakayama (若山 慎司, Wakayama Shinji; born 15 July 1973) is a Japanese politician of the Liberal Democratic Party, who serves as a member of the House of Representatives.

== Early years ==
On 15 July 1973, Wakayama was born in Gōdo, Anpachi District, Gifu. In 1997, while studying at Ibaraki University, he joined the office of Tetsuma Esaki. Upon graduating from the university in March of the same year, he became Esaki's secretary.

== Political career ==
On 5 October 2024, Esaki announced his retirement from politics. On 6 October, The LDP Aichi Prefectural Federation nominated Wakayama as Esaki's successor.

In the 2024 general election, Wakayama lost to CDP's Norimasa Fujiwara only by 162 votes but won a seat on the PR.

In the 2025 LDP presidential election, he endorsed Takayuki Kobayashi as a recommender.

In October 2025, he was appointed as Parliamentary Vice-Minister of Cabinet Office in the First Takaichi cabinet.

In the 2026 general election, he defeated CRA incumbent Fujiwara. After the election, he was reappointed as Parliamentary Vice-Minister of Cabinet Office in the Second Takaichi cabinet.
