= Chikage Oogi =

Japanese actress and politician (1933–2023)

- 扇 千景
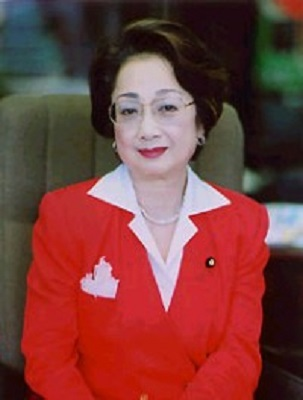
- Official portrait, 2001

President of the House of Councillors
- In office 30 July 2004 – 28 July 2007
- Monarch: Akihito
- Deputy: Giichi Tsunoda; Akira Imaizumi
- Preceded by: Hiroyuki Kurata
- Succeeded by: Satsuki Eda
Ministerial offices
Minister of Land, Infrastructure, Transport and Tourism
In office 6 January 2001 – 22 September 2003
Prime Minister	Yoshirō Mori; Junichirō Koizumi
Preceded by	Office established
Succeeded by	Nobuteru Ishihara
Minister of Transport
In office 5 December 2000 – 6 January 2001
Prime Minister	Yoshirō Mori
Preceded by	Hajime Morita
Succeeded by	Office abolished
Director-General of the Hokkaido Development Agency
In office 5 December 2000 – 6 January 2001
Prime Minister	Yoshirō Mori
Preceded by	Hajime Morita
Succeeded by	Office abolished
Minister of Construction
In office 4 July 2000 – 6 January 2001
Prime Minister	Yoshirō Mori
Preceded by	Masaaki Nakayama
Succeeded by	Office abolished
Director-General of the National Land Agency
In office 4 July 2000 – 6 January 2001
Prime Minister	Yoshirō Mori
Preceded by	Masaaki Nakayama
Succeeded by	Office abolished
Party political offices
Leader of the New Conservative Party
In office 3 April 2000 – September 2001
Preceded by	Position established
Succeeded by	Takeshi Noda

Member of the House of Councillors
- In office September 1993 – 28 July 2007
- Preceded by: Kenji Yamaoka
- Succeeded by: Multi-member district
- Constituency: National PR
- In office 11 July 1977 – 23 July 1989
- Constituency: National district (1977–1983); National PR (1983–1989)

Personal details
- Born: 10 May 1933 Suma, Kobe, Japan
- Died: 9 March 2023 (aged 89) Tokyo, Japan
- Party: Liberal Democratic (1977–1993; 2003–2023)
- Other political affiliations: JRP (1993–1994); NFP (1994–1997); LP (1998–2000); NCP (2000–2003)
- Spouse: Sakata Tōjūrō IV (m. 1958; died 2020)
- Children: Nakamura Ganjirō IV (eldest son); Nakamura Senjaku III (youngest son)
- Relatives: Nakamura Ganjirō II (father-in-law); Tamao Nakamura (sister-in-law); Shintaro Katsu (brother-in-law); Azuma Tokuho II (daughter-in-law); Nakamura Kazutarō (grandson); Nakamura Toranosuke (grandson)
- Education: Takarazuka Music School
- Occupation: Actress and politician

Chikage Oogi (扇 千景, Ōgi Chikage), real name Hiroko Hayashi (林 寛子, Hayashi Hiroko) (born Hiroko Kimura (木村 寛子, Kimura Hiroko); 10 May 1933 – 9 March 2023), was a Japanese actress and politician. During her 30-year-long political career, she served in various important governmental posts, and became the first female President of the House of Councillors, a role she held from 2004 to 2007.

Her pseudonymous surname is also spelled Ogi, Ōgi and Ohgi for a variety of Hepburn romanization systems. She herself used Oogi.

== Early life ==
Oogi was born and brought up in Kobe, Hyogo. She survived the Kobe Air Raid at age 11. She wrote later that her experience of the air raid had convinced her to make efforts to attain peace and national defense.

== Stage career ==
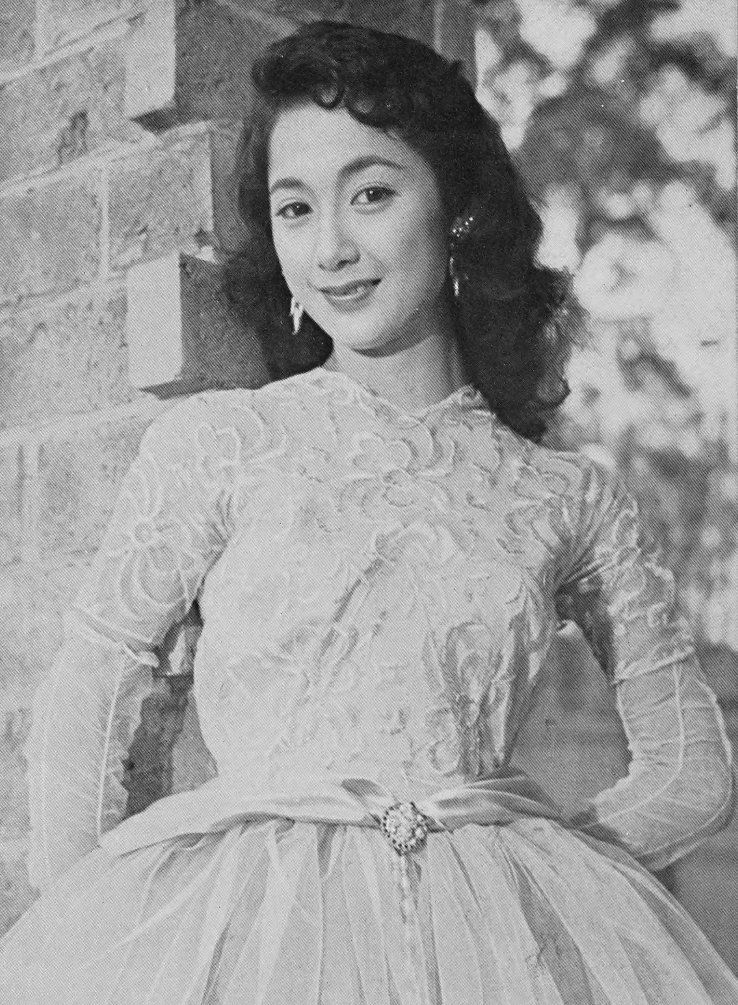
Oogi appeared in Kokusai Johosha 1957

Oogi graduated from Takarazuka Music School and joined the Takarazuka Revue in April 1954. Her first movie appearance was in October of that year. She retired from the revue in 1958.

Oogi had been a full-time homemaker for a year until she returned to work in a television drama on 29 October 1959, and later appeared on many television dramas and variety shows. She also hosted a popular tabloid show Sanji no Anata from 1971 to 1977. One of her co-hosts was Yoshiko Ōtaka, who was elected to the House of Councillors in 1974.

== Political career ==
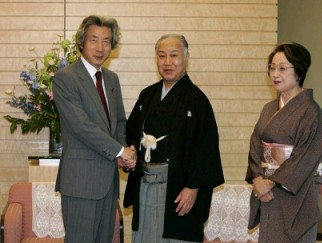
Then-Japanese Prime Minister Junichiro Koizumi (left), kabuki actor Sakata Tōjūrō IV (center), and actress and politician Chikage Oogi (right) during their meeting at the Kantei in Tokyo (27 October 2005)

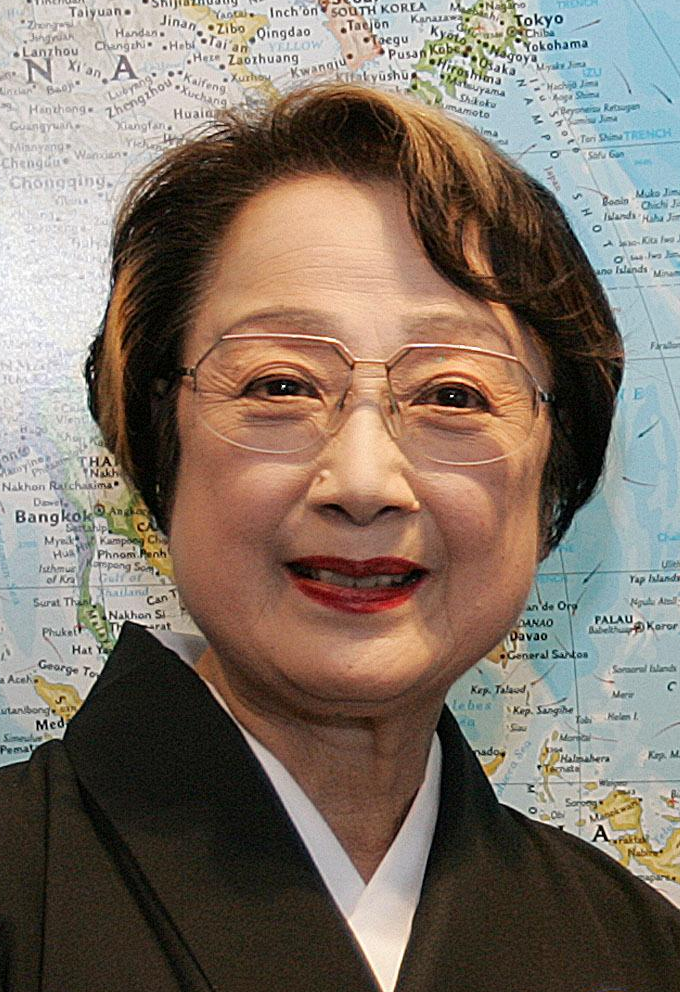
Oogi in Brazil in August 2006

Strenuously lobbied to run by Takeo Fukuda, Oogi first elected to the House of Councillors as a member of the Liberal Democratic Party in 1977. She was voted out in 1989, but elected again in 1993. The following year she left the LDP and joined the Japan Renewal Party, which merged into the New Frontier Party on 10 December 1994. The NFP torn up on 31 December 1997, Oogi became a member of the Liberal Party, stringing along with Ichirō Ozawa.

It was in 2000 that Oogi came to the forefront. She founded the Conservative Party, renamed the New Conservative Party soon, and became its first leader in April. Prime Minister of Japan Yoshiro Mori appointed Oogi as Minister of Construction and Director General of the National Land Agency in July, and also as Minister of Transportation and Director General of Hokkaido Development Agency in December. When these ministries and agencies merged into the Ministry of Land, Infrastructure and Transport as a result of the administrative reform of 2001, Oogi was installed as its first minister. She drew the nameboard displayed at the entrance of the building of the ministry with black ink and a brush.

The New Conservative Party's debacle at the House of Councillors election in July 2001 heightened calls among party members for a change in leadership. Oogi resigned as party leader and was succeeded by Takeshi Noda on 17 September 2001.

Oogi joined the Liberal Democratic Party in 2003 again for the first time since 1977. She was installed as the 26th President of the House of Councillors on 30 July 2004. She attended at the World Conference of Speakers of Parliaments held by the Inter-Parliamentary Union in September 2005. In October 2006 she made an official visit to China.

In May 2007, Oogi announced her retirement from politics in July so that she could lead an ordinary life with her family. Her term of office expired on 28 July 2007.

== Political views ==
=== Constitution ===
Oogi has critical views against the Constitution of Japan of 1947. She has said that the constitution has many problems such as ignoring environmental rights, obfuscating the Japanese Self-Defense Forces and its international contribution to keep peace, and excessively protecting criminals while making light of crime victims' human rights. She also made a controversial remark: "The Constitution of Japan deprived Japanese women of their graces of character."

=== Transfer of capital functions ===
A suggestion to transfer some capital functions out of Tokyo came under review in 1990s to solve the problem posed by the overconcentration of people in Tokyo. Oogi, who was the Minister of Construction in charge of this issue, expressed opposition to the transfer in September 2000. Her opposition created conflicts with Prime Minister Mori and with the mayors of the candidate cities.

=== Imperial succession ===
Upon Prince Hisahito's birth in September 2006, Oogi suggested that the lawmakers take a cautious attitude toward the Government's move to allow female and matrilineal succession of the Imperial Throne. She appreciated Princess Akishino for her third deliverance in this day of declining birthrate and said "We women would like to look to her as a model."

=== Tokyo International Airport ===
In 2000, Oogi proposed that Tokyo International Airport expand the international air service. Narita Airport, second busiest airport in Tokyo metropolitan area, which almost monopolized international flight service to Tokyo, is so distant from central Tokyo that there has long been a strong call among Japanese people for international air service of Tokyo Airport. Oogi's proposal was welcomed by then-Tokyo Governor Shintaro Ishihara.

== Personal life and death ==
In October 1958, Oogi married to Sakata Tōjūrō IV, a kabuki actor. They had two sons, Tomotaro (b. 6 February 1959) and Hirotaro (b. 19 December 1960), who are also both kabuki actors, following in their father's path. She had long hoped to have daughters or granddaughters possibly to be a Takarazuka actress.

Oogi's husband was notorious as a womanizer, as he admitted. Interviewed about his love affair with a maiko, which was exposed in a tabloid magazine in 2002, Oogi answered "I know that girl. She is intelligent and I favor her too," adding "A husband not attractive to women would be boring."

Her husband, Sakata Tōjūrō IV died of natural causes at the hospital in Tokyo on 12 November 2020, at the age of 88. About three years later, Oogi died of esophageal cancer at the hospital in Tokyo on 9 March 2023, at the age of 89. Old couple's death were both unrelated to triple Fukushima disaster and COVID-19 and Omicron infections. The announcement of her death to the media was delayed until 13 March 2023.

== Honours ==
- Grand Cordon of the Order of the Rising Sun, 2003. Japan
- Order of Brilliant Star with Special Grand Cordon, 2008. Republic of China
- Grand Cordon of the Order of the Paulownia Flowers, 2010. Japan

== Filmography ==
- Kaiketsutaka Series, 1954
- Onna no Gakkō, 1955
- Hatsukoi Waltz, 1955
- Shirai Gonpachi, 1956
- Shippū! Kurama Tengu, 1956
- Hakoiri Musume to Bantō, 1956
- Koi sugata kitsune goten (恋すがた狐御殿) (1956)
- Otoko no Hanamichi, 1956
- Ujō, 1957
- Bibō no Miyako, 1957
- A Teapicker's Song of Goodbye, 1957
- A Farewell to the Woman Called My Sister, 1957
- Hanayome wa Matteiru, 1957
- Seishun Kōro, 1957
- A Holiday in Tokyo, 1958
- Salaryman Shusse Taikōki, 1958
- Mikkokusha wa Dare ka, 1958
- Sanroku, 1962
- Mujō Hijō, 1968
- Profound Desires of the Gods, 1968

== See also ==
- Takako Doi – The first female Speaker of the House of Representatives (1993–1996)
- Hisayasu Nagata
- Junichiro Koizumi
- List of members of the Diet of Japan
- List of the first female holders of political offices

Political offices
Preceded by Hiroyuki Kurata	President of the House of Councillors; 30 July 2004 – 28 July 2007	Succeeded by Satsuki Eda
New title established	Minister of Land, Infrastructure and Transport; 6 January 2001 – 22 September 2003	Succeeded by Nobuteru Ishihara
New title established	Leader of New Conservative Party; 1 April 2000 – 17 September 2001	Succeeded by Takeshi Noda
Preceded by Masaaki Nakayama	Minister of Construction; 4 July 2000 – 6 January 2001	extinct
Preceded by Masaaki Nakayama	Director General of the National Land Agency; 4 July 2000 – 6 January 2001	extinct
Preceded by Hajime Morita	Minister of Transportation; 5 December 2000 – 6 January 2001	extinct
Preceded by Hajime Morita	Director General of Hokkaido Development Agency; 5 December 2000 – 6 January 2001	extinct
