= Motohisa Furukawa =

Japanese politician

- 古川 元久
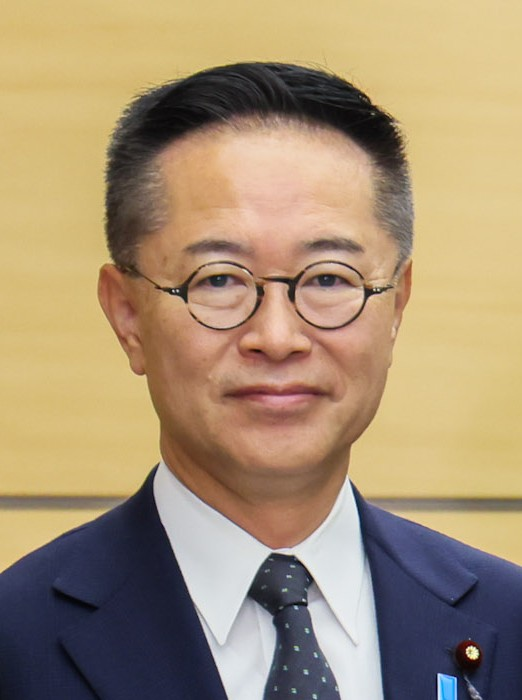
- Furukawa in 2025

Acting Leader of the Democratic Party For the People
- In office 4 December 2024 – 3 March 2025
- Leader: Yuichiro Tamaki

Minister of State for Special Missions
- In office 2 September 2011 – 1 October 2012
- Prime Minister: Yoshihiko Noda
- Succeeded by: Seiji Maehara

Deputy Chief Cabinet Secretary (Political affairs, House of Representatives)
- In office 8 June 2010 – 14 January 2011
- Prime Minister: Naoto Kan
- Preceded by: Yorihisa Matsuno
- Succeeded by: Hirohisa Fujii

Member of the House of Representatives
- Incumbent
- Assumed office 21 October 1996
- Preceded by: Constituency established
- Constituency: Tōkai PR (1996–2000); Aichi 2nd (2000–present)

Personal details
- Born: 6 December 1965 (age 60) Nagoya, Aichi, Japan
- Party: DPP (since 2018)
- Other political affiliations: DP 1996 (1996–1998); DPJ (1998–2016); DP 2016 (2016–2017); KnT (2017–2018)
- Education: University of Tokyo; Columbia University

Motohisa Furukawa (古川 元久, Furukawa Motohisa; born 6 December 1965) is a Japanese politician of the Democratic Party for the People and a member of the House of Representatives in the Diet (national legislature). A native of Nagoya, Aichi and graduate of the University of Tokyo, he joined the Ministry of Finance in 1988, attending Columbia University in the United States as a ministry official. Leaving the ministry in 1994, he took part in the formation of the Democratic Party of Japan in 1996 and was elected to the House of Representatives for the first time in the same year; he is currently serving his fourth term in this House. In September 2011 he was appointed as State Minister of National Strategy, Economic and Fiscal Policy in the cabinet of newly appointed prime minister Yoshihiko Noda.

Furukawa is a member of the World Economic Forum's Young Global Leaders and is founder of its Table For Two initiative.

On December 4, 2024, Furukawa became acting leader of the Democratic Party for the People following the suspension of Yuichiro Tamaki until March 3, 2025 amid controversy over the latter's extramarital affair.
