= Shōzō Kudō =

Japanese politician

- 工藤 彰三
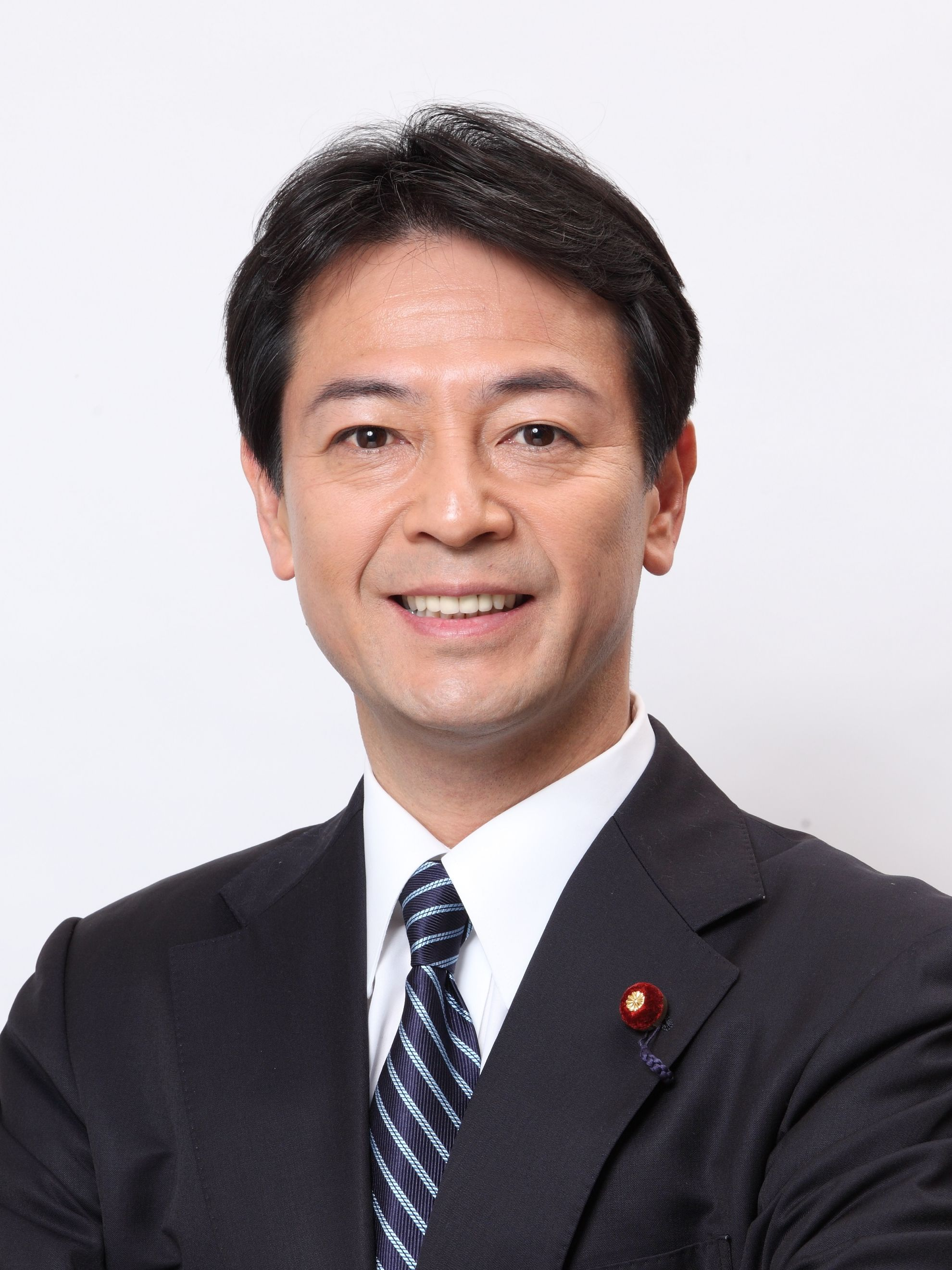
- Official portrait, 2013

Member of the House of Representatives
- Incumbent
- Assumed office 17 December 2012
- Preceded by: Yoshio Maki
- Constituency: Aichi 4th (2012–2024); Tōkai PR (2024–2026); Aichi 4th (2026–present)

Member of the Nagoya City Council
- In office April 2003 – 6 February 2011
- Constituency: Atsuta Ward

Personal details
- Born: 8 December 1964 (age 61) Atsuta-ku, Nagoya, Aichi, Japan
- Party: Liberal Democratic
- Education: Chuo University
- Website: Shōzō Kudō website

Shōzō Kudō (工藤 彰三, Kudō Shōzō; born 8 December 1964) is a Japanese politician of the Liberal Democratic Party, who serves as a member of the House of Representatives.

== Early years ==
Kudō was born in Atsuta-ku, Nagoya, Aichi Prefecture.

After graduating from the Faculty of Commerce at Chuo University, Kudō served as a secretary to Takeshi Kataoka, then a Member of the House of Representatives, from December 1992 to July 1993.

Subsequently, from November 1996 to March 2003, he served as a secretary to a member of the Nagoya City Council.

== Political career ==
In April 2003, Kudō ran in the Nagoya City Council election and won his first seat.

In the 2012 general election, Kudō defeated DPJ Incumbent Yoshio Maki and gain Aichi 4th's seat.

In the 2014 general election, Kudō defeated Maki (DPJ) and held the seat.

In the 2017 general election, Kudō defeated Kibō’s Maki after a close race and held the seat.

In 2018, Kudō was appointed to Parliamentary Vice-Minister for Land, Infrastructure, Transport and Tourism in Fourth Abe first reshuffled cabinet.

In the 2021 general election, Kudō defeated CDP’s Maki after a close race and held the seat.

In 2023, Kudō was appointed to State Minister of Cabinet Office in Second Kishida second reshuffled cabinet.

In the 2024 general election, Kudō lost to CDP's Maki and won a seat in Tōkai PR.

In the 2025 LDP presidential election, Kudō endorsed Sanae Takaichi as a recommender.

In the 2026 general election, Kudō defeated CRA's Maki and regain Aichi 4th’s seat.
