= Yoshio Maki =

Japanese politician

- 牧 義夫
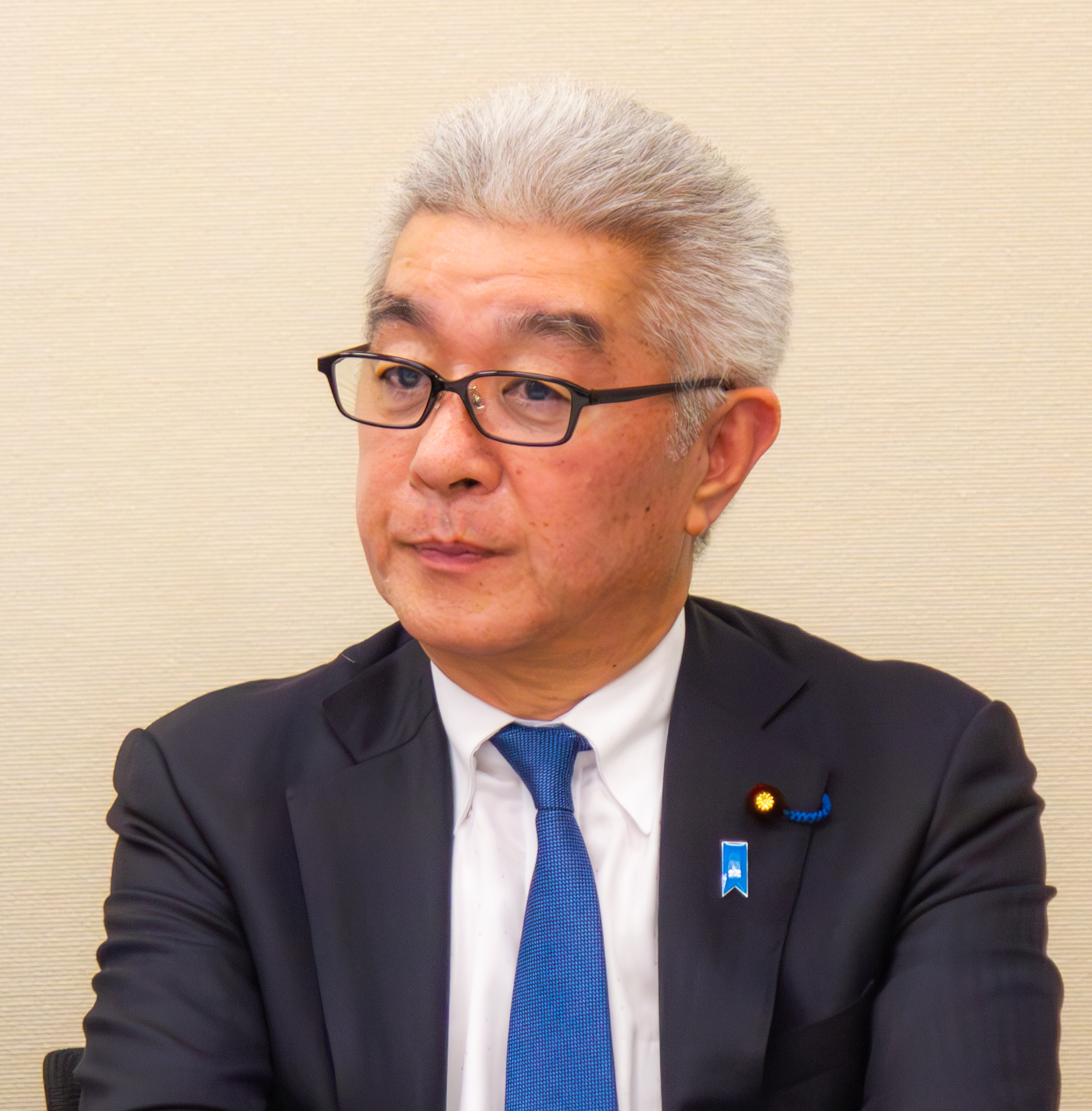
- Maki in 2025

Member of House of Representatives
- In office 14 December 2014 – 23 January 2026
- Preceded by: Multi-member district
- Succeeded by: Shōzō Kudō
- Constituency: Tōkai PR (2014–2024); Aichi 4th (2024–2026)
- In office 25 June 2000 – 16 December 2012
- Preceded by: Jun Misawa
- Succeeded by: Shōzō Kudō
- Constituency: Aichi 4th

Personal details
- Born: 14 January 1958 (age 68) Nagoya, Aichi, Japan
- Party: CRA (since 2026)
- Other political affiliations: DPJ (1998–2012); TPJ (2012–2014); JIP (2014–2016); DP (2016–2018); DPP (2018–2020); CDP (2020–2026)
- Education: Sophia University
- Website: Official website

Yoshio Maki (牧 義夫, Maki Yoshio; born 14 January 1958) is a Japanese politician of the Constitutional Democratic Party of Japan (CDPJ).

He is a member of the House of Representatives in the Diet (national legislature). A native of Nagoya, Aichi and drop-out of Sophia University, he was elected to the House of Representatives for the first time in 2000. He was defeated in 2012 by Shōzō Kudō, but regained a proportional representation seat in 2014.

He has held several positions on House of Representatives committees throughout his time in office, and served as Vice Minister of Health, Labour and Welfare from 2011 to 2012.
