= Mitsunori Okamoto =

Japanese politician

- 岡本 充功
- Official portrait, 2011

Member of the House of Representatives
- In office 29 October 2024 – 23 January 2026
- Preceded by: Yasumasa Nagasaka
- Succeeded by: Yasumasa Nagasaka
- Constituency: Aichi 9th
- In office 19 December 2014 – 14 October 2021
- Constituency: Tōkai PR
- In office 9 November 2003 – 16 November 2012
- Preceded by: Multi-member district
- Succeeded by: Yasumasa Nagasaka
- Constituency: Tōkai PR (2003–2009); Aichi 9th (2009–2012)

Personal details
- Born: 18 June 1971 (age 55) Yōkaichi, Shiga, Japan
- Party: CRA (since 2026)
- Other political affiliations: DPJ (2003–2016); DP (2016–2017); KnT (2017–2018); DPP (2018–2020); CDP (2020–2026)
- Education: Nagoya University

Mitsunori Okamoto (岡本 充功, Okamoto Mitsunori; born 18 June 1971) is a Japanese politician of the Constitutional Democratic Party, who served as a member of the House of Representatives in the Diet (national legislature). A native of Yōkaichi, Shiga and graduate of Nagoya University, he obtained his medical license in 1996 and received his Ph.D. in medicine from Nagoya University. He was elected to the House of Representatives for the first time in 2003. He was defeated in the 2005 election. He ran again to the House of Representatives in 2009 in the 9th district of Aichi defeating Prime Minister from 1989 to 1991, Toshiki Kaifu in a stunning upset.

After losing his seat and being in 6th of 5 elected candidates for the CDP in the Tōkai proportional representation block during the 2021 election, he won a constituency in 2024, defeating Yasumasa Nagasaka in Aichi 9th district.
