= Daisuke Nishino =

Japanese politician (born 1978)

- 西野 太亮
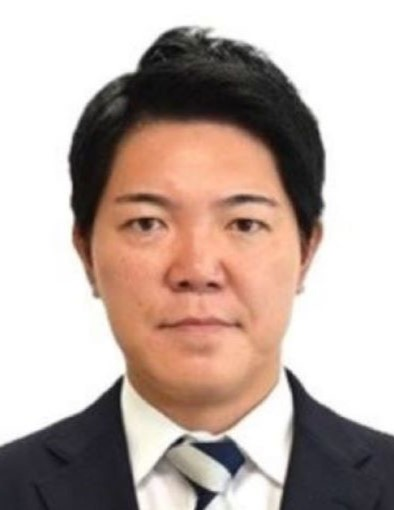
- Official portrait, 2021

Member of the House of Representatives
- Incumbent
- Assumed office 3 November 2021
- Preceded by: Takeshi Noda
- Constituency: Kumamoto 2nd

Personal details
- Born: 22 September 1978 (age 48) Akita, Kumamoto, Japan
- Party: Liberal Democratic
- Education: University of Tokyo

Daisuke Nishino (西野太亮, Nishino Daisuke; born 22 September 1978) is a Japanese politician serving as a member of the House of Representatives since 2021. He has served as parliamentary vice-minister of the Cabinet Office since 2024.
