= Kisogawa, Aichi =

Dissolved municipality in Aichi prefecture, Japan

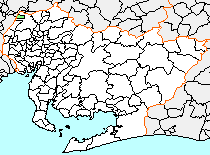
Location of Kisogawa in Aichi Prefecture

Kisogawa (木曽川町, Kisogawa-chō) was a town located in Haguri District, Aichi Prefecture, Japan.

On April 1, 2005, Kisogawa, along with the city of Bisai, was merged into the expanded city of Ichinomiya.

As of 2003, the town had an estimated population of 31,684 and a density of 3,331.65 persons per km^{2}. The total area was 9.51 km^{2}.
