= Kazumi Sugimoto =

Japanese politician

- 杉本 和巳
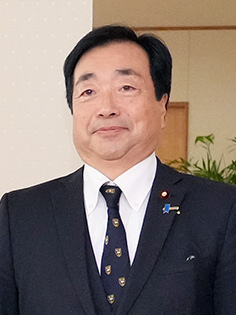
- Sugimoto in 2025

Member of the House of Representatives
- In office 22 October 2017 – 23 January 2026
- Preceded by: Multi-member district
- Succeeded by: Kenichirō Seki
- Constituency: Tōkai PR
- In office 30 August 2009 – 21 November 2014
- Preceded by: Tetsuma Esaki
- Succeeded by: Multi-member district
- Constituency: Aichi 10th (2009–2012); Tōkai PR (2012–2014)

Personal details
- Born: 17 September 1960 (age 66) Bunkyo, Tokyo, Japan
- Party: Innovation (since 2015)
- Other political affiliations: DPJ (2004–2012); Your Party (2012–2014); Independent (2014–2015)
- Education: Waseda University; University of Oxford; Harvard Kennedy School
- Website: 衆議院議員 杉本和巳 オフィシャルサイト

Kazumi Sugimoto is a Japanese politician who served as a member of the House of Representatives of Japan.

== Biography ==
He was attended School of Political Science and Economics, Waseda University, Special Diploma in Social Sciences, Graduate School, University of Oxford, and Master's degree, John F. Kennedy School of Government, Harvard University.

He was first elected in 2012, reelected in 2014, 2017, and 2021 as part of proportional representation.
