= Haguri District =

Former district in Aichi prefecture, Japan

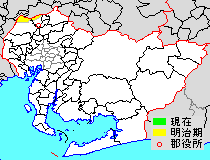
Location of former Haguri-gun, Aichi Prefecture, highlighted in yellow.

Colored areas are in this district.

Haguri District (葉栗郡, Haguri-gun) was a district located in Aichi Prefecture, Japan.

As of 2003, the district had an estimated population of 31,684 and a density of 3,331.65 persons per km^{2}. The total area was 9.51 km^{2}.

== Municipalities ==
Prior to its dissolution, the district consisted of only one town:

- Kisogawa (Note: Classified as a town.)

== History ==
=== Recent mergers ===
- On April 1, 2005 - The town of Kisogawa, along with the city of Bisai, was merged into the expanded city of Ichinomiya. Therefore, Haguri District was dissolved, as a result of this merger.

== See also ==
- List of dissolved districts of Japan
