= Nagasu, Kumamoto =

Nagasu 長洲町
- Town
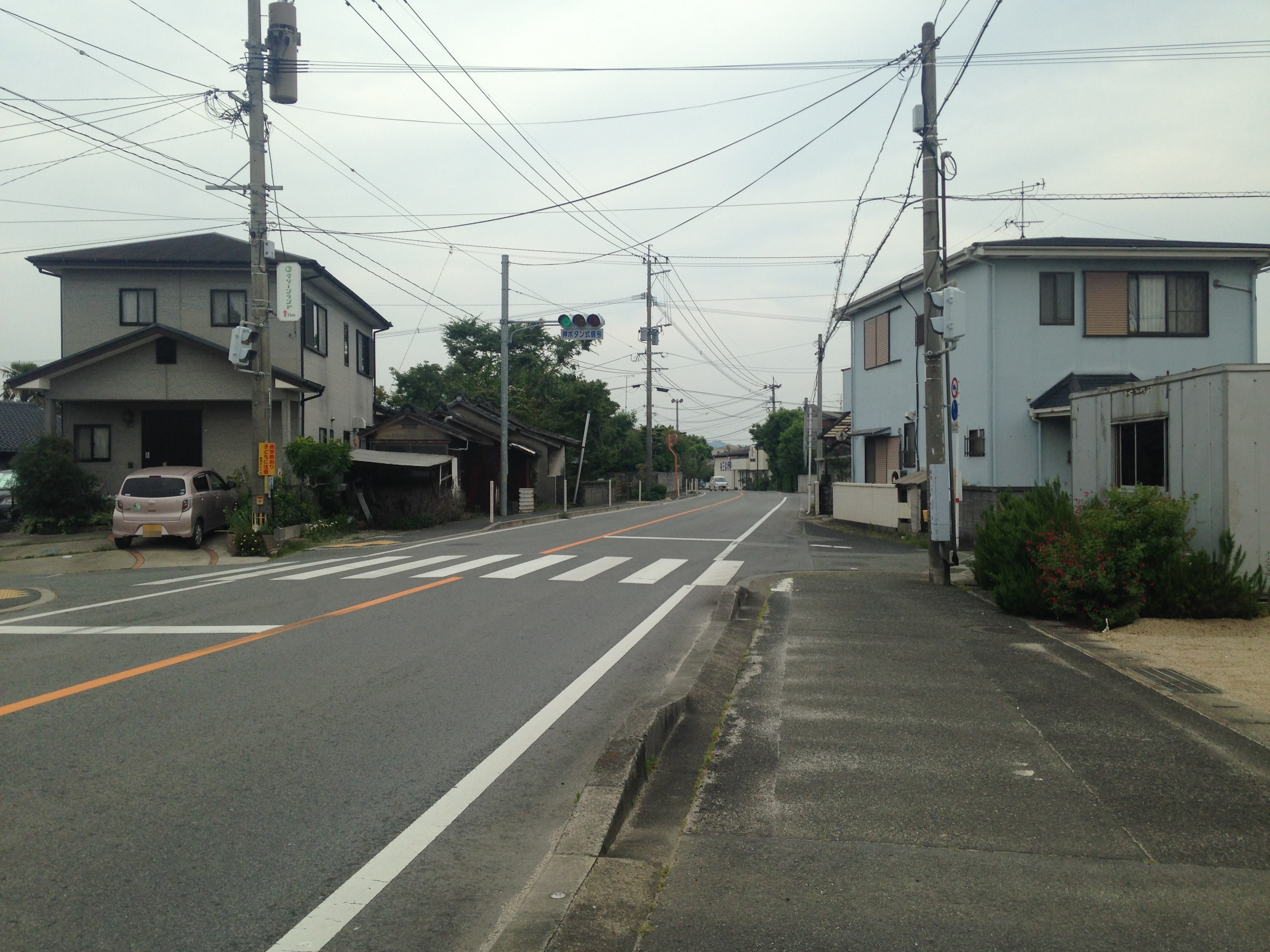
- Nagasu Town

- Flag Seal
- Location of Nagasu in Kumamoto Prefecture

- Location in Japan
- Coordinates: 32°55′47″N 130°27′10″E
- Country: Japan
- Region: Kyushu
- Prefecture: Kumamoto
- District: Tamana

Area
  - Total: 19.44 km^{2} (7.51 sq mi)

Population (July 31, 2024)
  - Total: 15,307
  - Density: 787.4/km^{2} (2,039/sq mi)
- Time zone: UTC+09:00 (JST)
- City hall address: 2766 Nagasu, Nagasu-machi, Tamana-gun, Kumamoto-ken 869-0198
- Website: Official website
- Symbols
- Flower: Antirrhinum majus
- Tree: Ilex rotunda

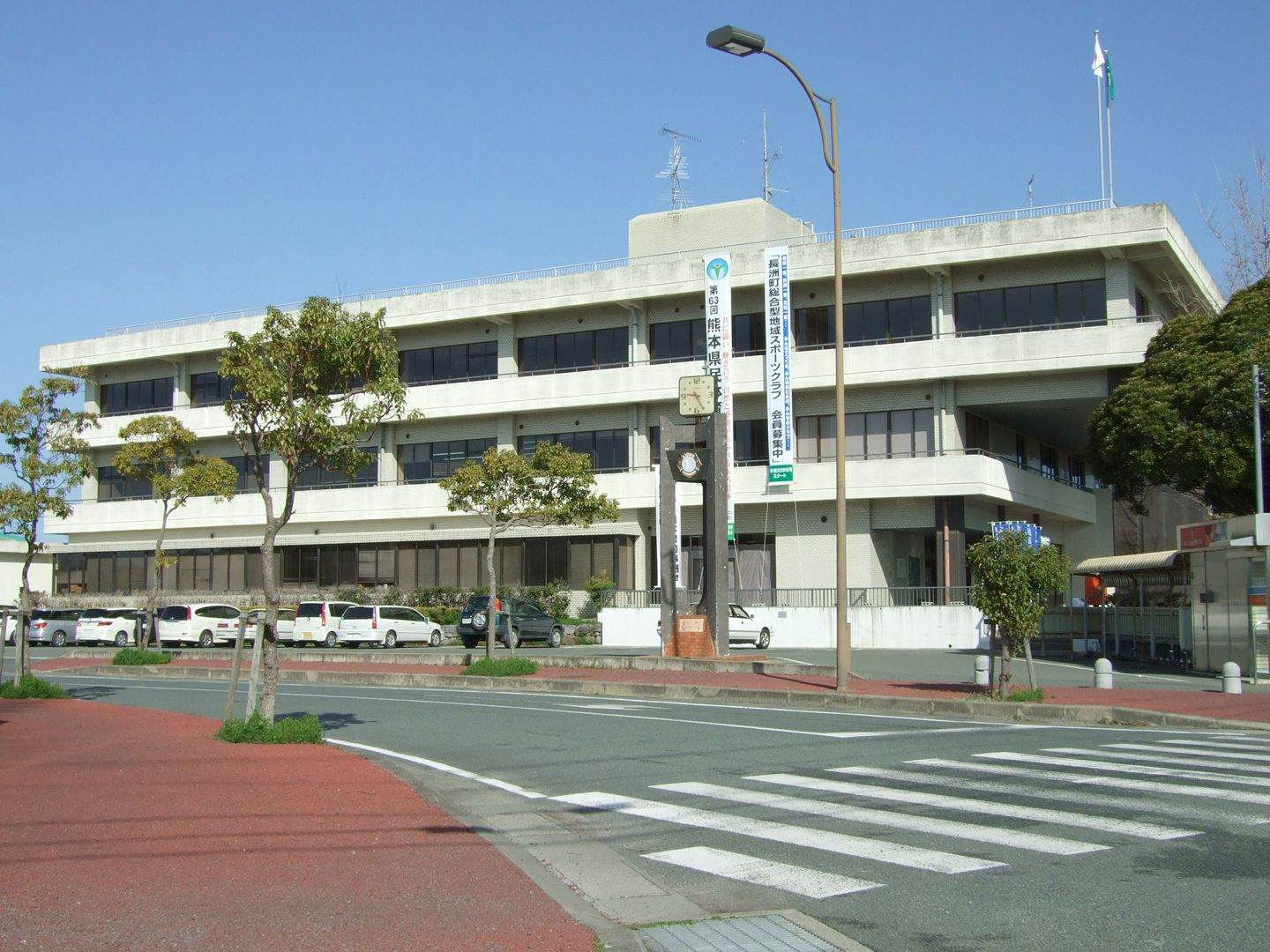
Nagasu Town Hall

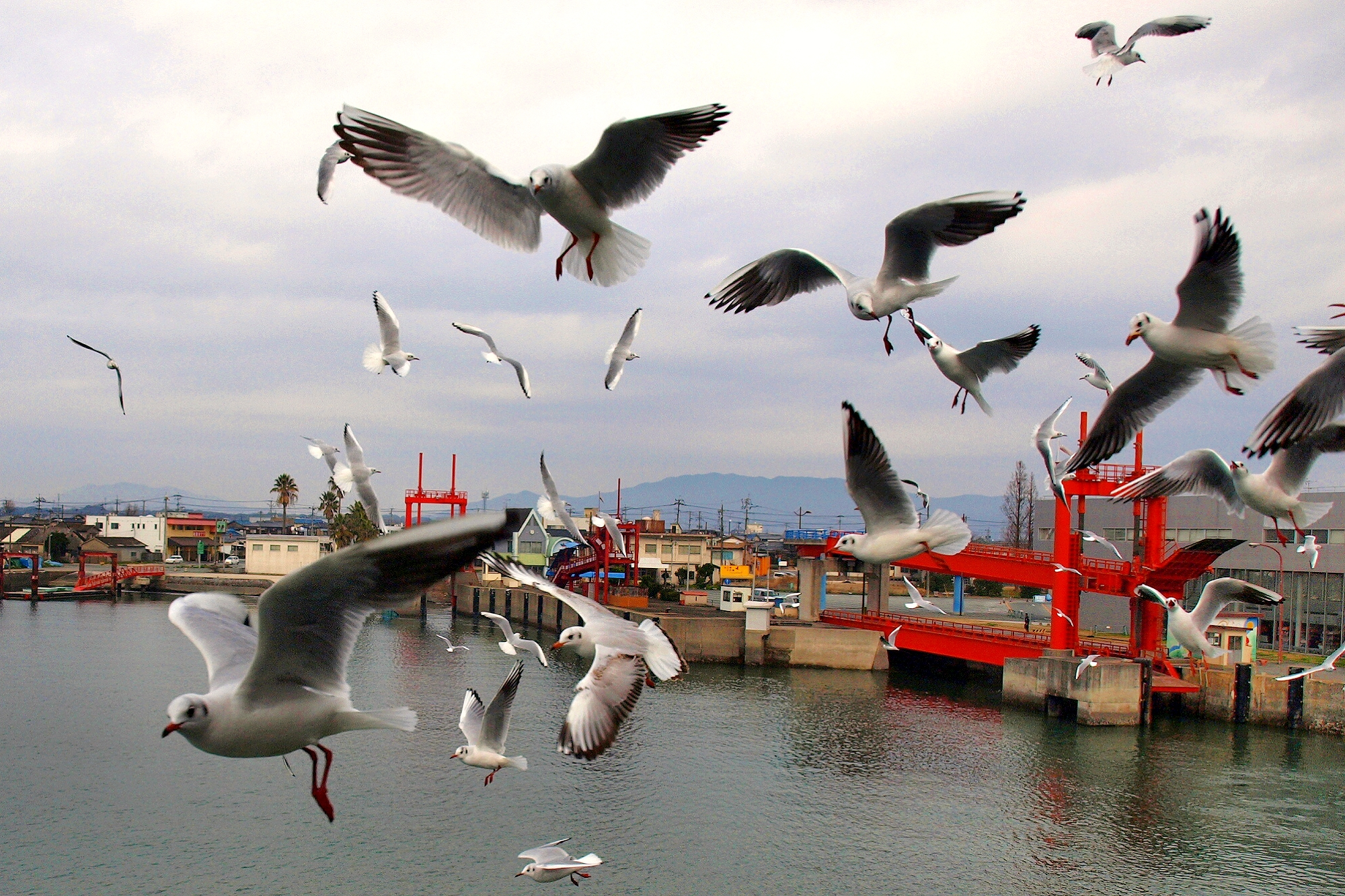
Nagasu port

Nagasu (長洲町, Nagasu-machi) is a town located in Tamana District, Kumamoto Prefecture, Japan.As of 31 July 2024, the town had an estimated population of 15,307 in 7437 households, and a population density of 790 persons per km^{2}. The total area of the town is 19.44 km^{2} (7.51 sq mi).

== Geography ==
Nagasu is located about 40 kilometers northwest of Kumamoto City in northwestern Kumamoto Prefecture. The southwestern part of the town faces the Ariake Sea. Part of the area along the Ariake Sea is land that was reclaimed during the Edo period. The area is generally low-lying, but the inland area in the eastern part of the town is slightly hilly. The Ariake Ferry operates from Nagasu Port in the town to the Shimabara Peninsula.

=== Neighboring municipalities ===
Kumamoto Prefecture

- Arao
- Tamana

=== Climate ===
Nagasu has a humid subtropical climate (Köppen Cfa) characterized by warm summers and cool winters with light to no snowfall. The average annual temperature in Nagasu is 16.6 °C. The average annual rainfall is 1932 mm with September as the wettest month. The temperatures are highest on average in August, at around 27.1 °C, and lowest in January, at around 6.40 °C.

=== Demographics ===
Per Japanese census data, the population of Nagasu is as shown below

Historical population
Year	Pop.	±%
1970	14,084	—
1980	16,715	+18.7%
1990	17,605	+5.3%
2000	17,956	+2.0%
2010	16,594	−7.6%
2020	15,372	−7.4%

== History ==
The area of Nagasu was part of ancient Higo Province. During the Edo Period it was part of the holdings of Kumamoto Domain. After the Meiji restoration, the town of Nagasu was established with the creation of the modern municipalities system on April 1, 1889.

== Government ==
Nagasu has a mayor-council form of government with a directly elected mayor and a unicameral town council of 14 members. Nagasu, collectively with the other municipalities of Tamana District, contributes one member to the Kumamoto Prefectural Assembly. In terms of national politics, the town is part of the Kumamoto 2nd district of the lower house of the Diet of Japan.

== Economy ==
The local economy is based on commercial fishing, aquaculture of edible seaweed and goldfish, and food processing. Local industries are mostly related to shipbuilding and ship repair.

== Education ==
Nagasu has four public elementary schools and one public junior high school operated by the town government. The town does not have a high school.

== Transportation ==
=== Railways ===
JR Kyushu - Kagoshima Main Line

JA Nagasu

=== Highways ===
- National Route 389
- National Route 501

== Local attractions ==
- Tachibana Ginchiyo grave

== Notable people from Nagasu ==
- Takeshi Hayashida, politician
