= Takeshi Noda =

Japanese politician

- 野田 毅
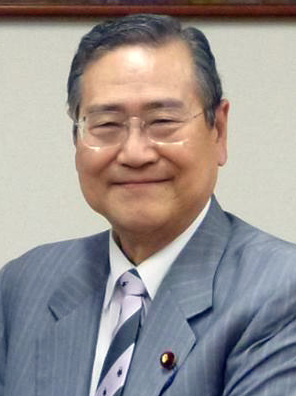
- Noda in 2014

Leader of the New Conservative Party
- In office September 2001 – December 2002
- Preceded by: Chikage Oogi
- Succeeded by: Hiroshi Kumagai

Minister of Home Affairs
- In office 14 January 1999 – 5 October 1999
- Prime Minister: Keizō Obuchi
- Preceded by: Mamoru Nishida
- Succeeded by: Kosuke Hori

Chairman of the National Public Safety Commission
- In office 14 January 1999 – 5 October 1999
- Prime Minister: Keizō Obuchi
- Preceded by: Mamoru Nishida
- Succeeded by: Kosuke Hori

Director-General of the Economic Planning Agency
- In office 5 November 1991 – 12 December 1992
- Prime Minister: Kiichi Miyazawa
- Preceded by: Michio Ochi
- Succeeded by: Hajime Funada

Minister of Construction
- In office 3 June 1989 – 10 August 1989
- Prime Minister: Sōsuke Uno
- Preceded by: Hikosaburo Okonogi
- Succeeded by: Shōzō Harada

Member of the House of Representatives; from Kyushu
- In office 10 December 1972 – 14 October 2021
- Preceded by: Takeo Noda
- Succeeded by: Daisuke Nishino
- Constituency: See list: Kumamoto 1st (1972–1996); Kumamoto 2nd (1996–2003) PR block (2003–2005); Kumamoto 2nd (2005–2009); PR block (2009–2012); Kumamoto 2nd (2012–2021)

Personal details
- Born: 3 October 1941 (age 85) Suginami, Tokyo, Japan
- Party: Liberal Democratic
- Other political affiliations: NFP (1994–1998); LP (1998–2000); NCP (2000–2003)
- Relatives: Takeo Noda (father-in-law)
- Education: University of Tokyo

Takeshi Noda (野田 毅, Noda Takeshi; born 3 October 1941) is a former Japanese politician of the Liberal Democratic Party (LDP), who served as a member of the House of Representatives in the Diet (national legislature).

== Background and career ==
A native of Tokyo and graduate of the University of Tokyo he joined the Ministry of Finance in 1964. In 1972 when his father-in-law Takeo Noda died, he left the ministry to run for Takeo Noda's seat and was elected for the first time. Later, he served as the Minister of Construction in 1989 (Uno Cabinet), Minister of State for Economic and Fiscal Policy (Miyazawa Cabinet), Minister of Home Affairs (Obuchi Cabinet), Chairman, General Assembly of Party Members of the House of Representatives of LDP. Noda served in the House of Representatives for 16 terms, until he lost reelection in the Kumamoto 2nd district in 2021.

== Positions regarding key issues ==
Noda gave the following answers to the questionnaire submitted to lawmakers by Mainichi in 2012:

- in favor of the revision of the constitution
- in favor of collective-self-defense (which implies a revision of the Article 9)
- in favor of the reform to a unicameral legislative system
- in favor of a strong stance versus China
- the possibility of a nuclear-armed Japan should be considered in the future
- in favor of the reactivation of nuclear plants, against the goal of zero-nuclear energy by 2030
- against the reform of the Imperial Household that would allow women to retain their Imperial status even after marriage
- in favor of relocating the US Marine Corps Air Station Futenma in Okinawa
- against the Trans-Pacific Partnership

Noda was also the chairman of the pro-tobacco lobby in the Japanese Diet.
