= Bisai, Aichi =

Bisai 尾西市
- City
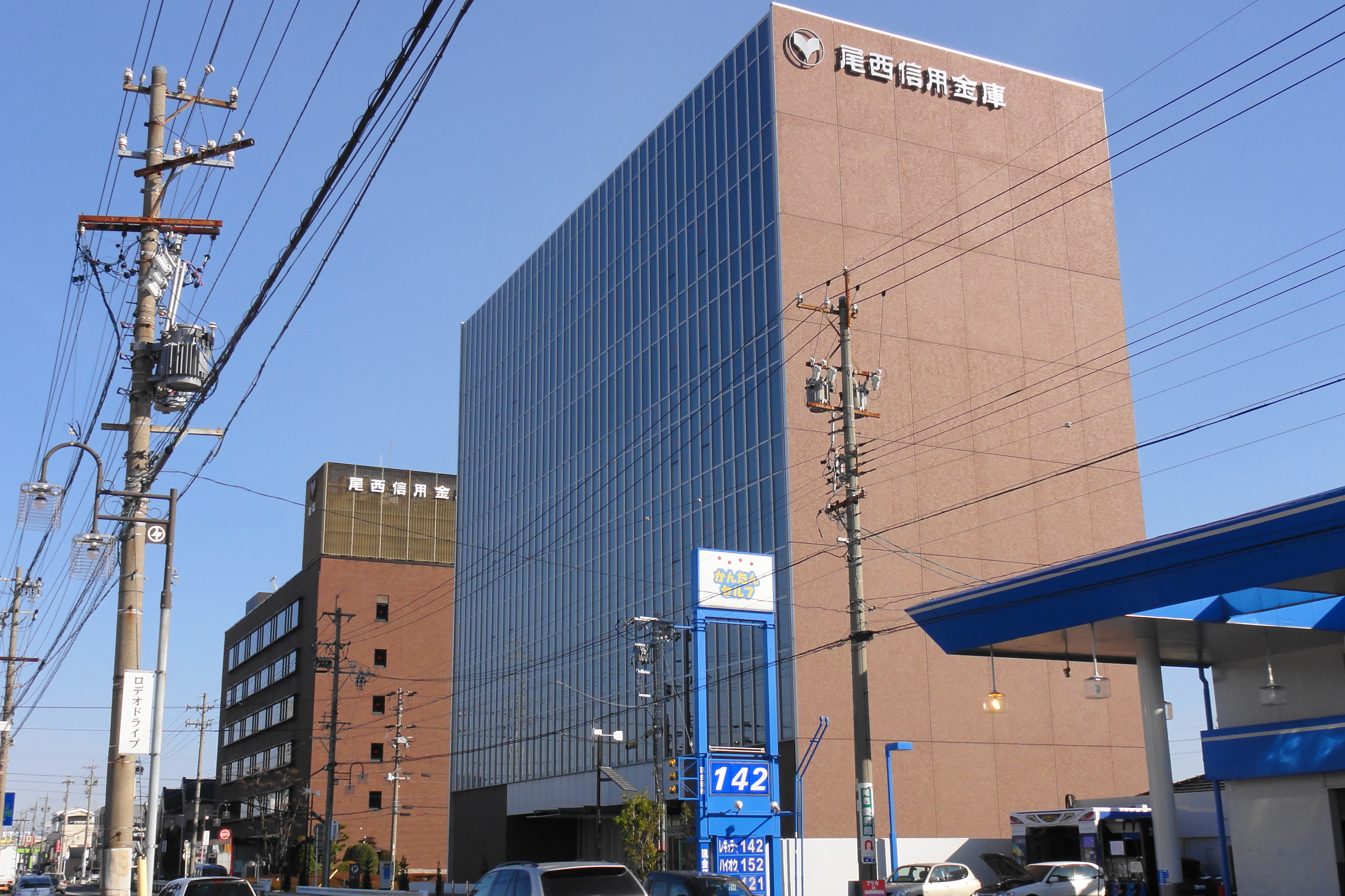
- Office buildings in Bisai

- Flag Emblem

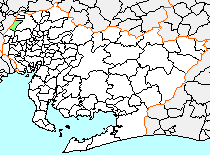
- Location of Bisai in Aichi Prefecture

- Location within Japan
- Country: Japan
- Region: Chūbu
- Prefecture: Aichi Prefecture

Area
  - Total: 22.01 km^{2} (8.50 sq mi)

Population (2003)
  - Total: 58,037
  - Density: 2,636.85/km^{2} (6,829.4/sq mi)
- Time zone: UTC+9 (Japan Standard Time)
- Merged into: Ichinomiya

Bisai (尾西市, Bisai-shi) was a city located in Aichi Prefecture, Japan. The city was founded on January 1, 1955.

On April 1, 2005, Bisai, along with the town of Kisogawa (from Haguri District), was merged into the expanded city of Ichinomiya.
