= 2000 Japanese general election =

- 25 June 2000

All 480 seats in the House of Representatives 241 seats needed for a majority
- Turnout: 62.49% (▲2.84pp; Const. votes); 62.45% (▲2.82pp; PR votes)
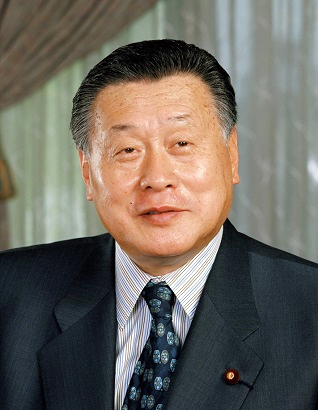

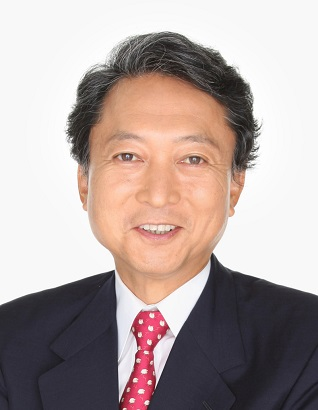

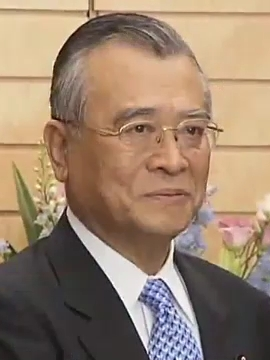

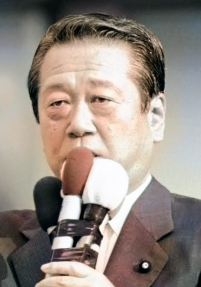

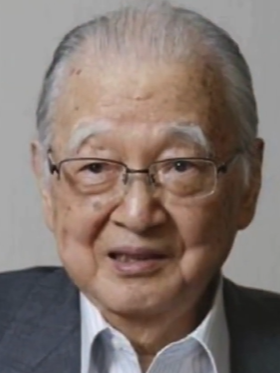

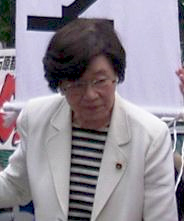
	First party	Second party	Third party
Leader	Yoshirō Mori	Yukio Hatoyama	Takenori Kanzaki
Party	LDP	Democratic	New Kōmeitō
Last election	239 seats	52 seats (Note: as DP (1996))	Did not exist
Seats before	271	95	42
Seats won	233	127	31
Seat change	▼6	▲75	New
Constituency vote	24,945,807	16,811,732	1,231,753
% and swing	40.97% (▲2.34pp)	27.61% (▲16.99pp)	2.02% (New)
Regional vote	16,943,425	15,067,990	7,762,032
% and swing	28.31% (▼4.45pp)	25.18% (▲9.08pp)	12.97% (New)
	Fourth party	Fifth party	Sixth party
Leader	Ichirō Ozawa	Tetsuzo Fuwa	Takako Doi
Party	Liberal	JCP	Social Democratic
Last election	Did not exist	26 seats	15 seats
Seats before	18	26	14
Seats won	22	20	19
Seat change	New	▼6	▲4
Constituency vote	2,053,736	7,352,844	2,315,235
% and swing	3.37% (New)	12.08% (▼0.47pp)	3.80% (▲1.61pp)
Regional vote	6,589,490	6,719,016	5,603,680
% and swing	11.01% (New)	11.23% (▼1.85pp)	9.36% (▲2.98pp)
- Districts and PR districts, shaded according to winners' vote strength
Prime Minister before election
Yoshirō Mori
LDP
Elected Prime Minister
Yoshirō Mori
LDP

General elections were held in Japan on 25 June 2000 to elect the 480 members of the House of Representatives.

The ruling Liberal Democratic Party (LDP) remained the largest party in the House of Representatives but lost seats, along with its two coalition partners. Two cabinet members, Takashi Fukaya and Tokuichiro Tamazawa, lost their seats. The Democratic Party made major gains under the leadership of Yukio Hatoyama.

== Background ==
Prime Minister Keizo Obuchi suffered a stroke in April 2000 and was replaced by Yoshiro Mori. Although the term limit for the House of Representatives would have been reached in October 2000, Mori dissolved the House on June 2 in what became popularly known as the Divine Nation Dissolution (神の国解散) due to a controversial statement by Mori prior to the election, which preceded a slump in government approval ratings from 40% to 20%. The LDP government advocated continued public works spending while the opposition advocated less spending and more governmental reforms.

The Social Democratic Party left the coalition in 1998 and re-join the opposition after years of coalition with the ideologically contrasting LDP.

Meanwhile, the New Komeito Party, a centrist party with roots from the Soka Gakkai based on the Nichiren Buddhist movement and despite almost decades of opposition against the LDP, shifted from centre towards conservatism. An electoral alliance between the once rivals of the New Komeito and the LDP has been in effect since the Japanese General election in 2000. For the LDP, despite not being able to win an absolute majority of votes by itself in further elections (especially for the House of Councillors which the LDP lost majority since 1989), the New Komeito party has been counted on since then to ensure a stable governing majority rule.

== Political parties ==
Parties	Leader	Ideology	Seats		Status
Parties	Leader	Ideology	1996 election	At dissolution	Status
Liberal Democratic Party	Yoshirō Mori	Conservatism (Japanese); Japanese nationalism Conservative liberalism Japanese neoconservatism Liberal conservatism Social conservatism Collective capitalism Economic liberalism Ultranationalism Militarism	239 / 500	271 / 500	Government
Democratic Party of Japan	Yukio Hatoyama	Liberalism	52 / 500 (Note: Democratic Party of Japan)	95 / 500	Opposition
Democratic Party of Japan	Yukio Hatoyama	Liberalism	2 / 500	95 / 500	Opposition
New Komeito Party	Takenori Kanzaki	Buddhist democracy	Did not exist	42 / 500	Government
Japanese Communist Party	Tetsuzo Fuwa	Communism	26 / 500	26 / 500	Opposition
Liberal Party	Ichirō Ozawa	Liberalism; Neoliberalism	Did not exist	18 / 500	Opposition
Conservative Party	Chikage Oogi	Conservatism	Did not exist	18 / 500	Government
Social Democratic Party	Takako Doi	Social democracy	15 / 500	14 / 511	Opposition
Independent Association	Shiina Motō	—	Did not exist	4 / 500	Opposition
New Party Sakigake	Masayoshi Takemura	Liberalism; Reformism	2 / 500	1 / 500	Opposition
Liberal League	Torao Tokuda	Classical liberalism	0 / 500	1 / 500	Opposition
New Frontier Party	Ichirō Ozawa	Neoconservatism (Japanese); Neoliberalism	156 / 500	Split	—N/a

== Results ==
Constituency cartogram

The House of Representatives consisted of 480 members, 300 elected from single-member constituencies and 180 elected on a proportional basis from eleven multi-member constituencies known as Block constituencies.

Party	Proportional			Constituency			Total seats	+/–
Party	Votes	%	Seats	Votes	%	Seats	Total seats	+/–
Liberal Democratic Party	16,943,425	28.31	56	24,945,807	40.97	177	233	−6
Democratic Party of Japan	15,067,990	25.18	47	16,811,732	27.61	80	127	New
New Komeito Party	7,762,032	12.97	24	1,231,753	2.02	7	31	New
Japanese Communist Party	6,719,016	11.23	20	7,352,844	12.08	0	20	−6
Liberal Party	6,589,490	11.01	18	2,053,736	3.37	4	22	New
Social Democratic Party	5,603,680	9.36	15	2,315,235	3.80	4	19	+4
Liberal League	660,724	1.10	0	1,071,012	1.76	1	1	New
New Conservative Party	247,334	0.41	0	1,230,464	2.02	7	7	New
Independent Association	151,345	0.25	0	652,138	1.07	5	5	New
Socialist Party	99,565	0.17	0				0	New
Reform Club				203,736	0.33	0	0	New
New Socialist Party				34,809	0.06	0	0	New
Urban New Party				7,830	0.01	0	0	New
Liberal Party				3,235	0.01	0	0	New
Seiyu Koshikai				1,071	0.00	0	0	New
Independents				2,967,069	4.87	15	15	+6
Total	59,844,601	100.00	180	60,882,471	100.00	300	480	−20
Valid votes	59,844,601	95.37		60,882,471	97.01			
Invalid/blank votes	2,904,983	4.63		1,877,318	2.99			
Total votes	62,749,584	100.00		62,759,789	100.00			
Registered voters/turnout	100,492,328	62.44		100,433,798	62.49			
Source: Election Resources, IPU

=== By prefecture ===
Prefecture	Total seats	Seats won								
Prefecture	Total seats	LDP	DPJ	NKP	NCP	AI	SDP	LP	LL	Ind.
Aichi	15	5	9		1					
Akita	3	3								
Aomori	4	3				1				
Chiba	12	7	5							
Ehime	4	4								
Fukui	3	3								
Fukuoka	11	8	2							1
Fukushima	5	3	1			1				
Gifu	5	5								
Gunma	5	5								
Hiroshima	7	5				1				1
Hokkaido	13	7	6							
Hyōgo	12	3	3	2	2		1			1
Ibaraki	7	5	1							1
Ishikawa	3	3								
Iwate	4	1						3		
Kagawa	3	2								1
Kagoshima	5	4							1	
Kanagawa	17	9	6			1		1		
Kōchi	3	3								
Kumamoto	5	2	1		1					1
Kyoto	6	5	1							
Mie	5	2	2							1
Miyagi	6	2	4							
Miyazaki	3	3								
Nagano	5	3	2							
Nagasaki	4	2	1							1
Nara	4	4								
Niigata	6	4	1							1
Ōita	4	2	1				1			
Okayama	5	5								
Okinawa	3	1		1			1			
Osaka	19	8	5	4	1		1			
Saga	3	3								
Saitama	14	6	6			1				1
Shiga	3	2	1							
Shimane	3	3								
Shizuoka	9	4	4							1
Tochigi	5	4	1							
Tokushima	3	2	1							
Tokyo	25	8	13		1					3
Tottori	2	2								
Toyama	3	3								
Wakayama	3	1			1					1
Yamagata	4	3	1							
Yamaguchi	4	3	1							
Yamanashi	3	2	1							
Total	300	177	80	7	7	5	4	4	1	15

=== By PR block ===
PR block	Total seats	Seats won					
PR block	Total seats	LDP	DPJ	NKP	JCP	LP	SDP
Chūgoku	11	4	2	2	1	1	1
Hokkaido	8	2	3	1	1		1
Hokuriku–Shinetsu	11	4	3	1	1	1	1
Kinki (Kansai)	30	7	7	5	5	3	3
Kyushu	21	7	4	3	2	2	3
Northern Kanto	20	7	5	3	2	2	1
Shikoku	6	3	1	1	1		
Southern Kanto	21	6	6	3	2	2	2
Tohoku	14	5	3	1	1	3	1
Tōkai	21	7	7	2	2	2	1
Tokyo	17	4	6	2	2	2	1
Total	180	56	47	24	20	18	15

== Analysis ==
The further entrenchment of the 1955 System continued, with the Democratic Party of Japan replacing the New Frontier Party as the primary opposition to the LDP. The Social Democratic Party saw a brief resurgence following its near destruction in 1996, but the decline of the party would continue in the following election. The election set the groundwork for the system of politics that would lay how Japanese elections work until the collapse of the Democratic Party of Japan in the mid-2010s.
