= New Conservative Party (Japan) =

The New Conservative Party (NCP) was the name of two now-defunct political parties in Japan with a common lineage.

The first incarnation of the party (保守党, Hoshutō, lit. 'Conservative Party') was founded on April 3, 2000 by 20 lower house and 6 upper house defectors from the Liberal Party. This party was dissolved briefly and then re-established (as 保守新党, Hoshu Shintō, lit. 'New Conservative Party') on December 25, 2002 in order to accommodate defectors from the Democratic Party of Japan.

The party eventually merged with the Liberal Democratic Party after the 2003 election.

== First New Conservative Party ==
New Conservative Party
- Leader: Takeshi Noda
- Founder: Chikage Oogi
- Founded: April 3, 2000
- Dissolved: December 23, 2002
- Split from: Liberal Party
- Succeeded by: New Conservative Party (2002)
- Ideology: Conservatism

Website
- http://www.hoshutoh.com/

In 2000, Liberal Party leader Ichiro Ozawa decided to take his party out of its coalition with the ruling conservative Liberal Democratic Party (LDP) and go into opposition. However, some of his party members wanted to remain in the government, and thus defected to form the New Conservative Party.

Takeshi Noda had been favored to be founding president, but he opted to become the secretary-general. Toshiki Kaifu also declined the position, so Chikage Oogi, a former Takarazuka actress, was selected as party president.

The New Conservative Party became part of a three-party ruling coalition with the LDP and New Komeito. This incarnation of the party was dissolved on December 23, 2002.

=== Leaders ===
No.	Name	Image	Term of office	
No.	Name	Image	Took office	Left office
Preceding party: Liberal Party
1	Chikage Oogi		April 3 2000	September 2001
2	Takeshi Noda		September 2001	December 2002
Successor party: New Conservative Party (2002)

== Second New Conservative Party ==
New Conservative Party
- Leader: Hiroshi Kumagai
- Founded: December 25, 2002
- Dissolved: November 10, 2003
- Merger of: New Conservative Party (2000); Democratic Party of Japan (defectors)
- Merged into: Liberal Democratic Party
- Ideology: Conservatism; Reformism
- Political position: Right-wing

Website
- http://www.hoshushintoh.com/

Japan's Public Offices Election Law prohibits lawmakers that were elected to proportional representation seats from switching to a party that they had competed against in the last election without first resigning their seat, so the original incarnation of the New Conservative Party was unable to accept defectors from the Democratic Party of Japan (DPJ) into its ranks.

The dissolution and re-establishment of the party on December 25, 2002 created a new legal entity, unconstrained by this rule. This allowed Hiroshi Kumagai and four other disgruntled DPJ members (Takao Satō, Yoichiro Esaki, Zenjiro Kaneko and Eriko Yamatani) to form the new party together with nine members from its previous incarnation, with Kumagai becoming the party leader. The new party took over the role of its predecessor in the LDP-led ruling coalition.

The party was a conservative reformist party and was very right-wing. After the November 2003 general election, the New Conservative Party was left with only four members in the House of Representatives, down from nine prior to the election. Among the losers in the election was the party president, Hiroshi Kumagai.

On November 10, 2003, then-Prime Minister Koizumi proposed that the NCP merge with the LDP. The secretary-general of the NCP, Toshihiro Nikai, confirmed the merger, stating "We humbly received the proposal and, after discussion within the party, we agreed to accept the proposal to deliver the policies we promised to voters."

=== Leaders ===
No.	Name	Image	Term of office	
No.	Name	Image	Took office	Left office
Preceding party: New Conservative Party (2000)
1	Hiroshi Kumagai		December 25 2002	November 10 2003
Successor party: Liberal Democratic Party

== Electoral results ==
=== House of Representatives ===
House of Representatives
Election	Leader	# of seats won	# of Constituency votes	% of Constituency vote	# of PR Block votes	% of PR Block vote
2000	Chikage Oogi	7 / 480	1,230,464	2.02%	247,334	0.41%
2003	Hiroshi Kumagai	4 / 480	791,588	1.33	-	-

=== House of Councillors ===
House of Councillors
Election	Leader	No. of seats total	No. of seats won	No. of National votes	% of National vote	Majority/minority
2001	Chikage Oogi	4 / 247	1 / 121	1,275,002	2.33	Minority

== See also ==
- Politics of Japan
- Liberal Democratic Party (Japan)
- 2003 Japan general election
