= Liberal Party (Japan, 1998) =

Former political party in Japan

Liberal Party 自由党 Jiyūtō
- Leader: Ichirō Ozawa
- Founders: Ichirō Ozawa; Hirohisa Fujii
- Founded: 1 January 1998
- Dissolved: 26 September 2003
- Split from: New Frontier Party
- Merged into: Democratic Party of Japan
- Ideology: Liberalism (Japanese); Neoliberalism; Libertarianism
- Political position: Centre-right
- International affiliation: Liberal International (observer)
- Colors: Blue

The Liberal Party (自由党, Jiyū-tō) was a political party in Japan formed in 1998 by Ichirō Ozawa and Hirohisa Fujii. It is now defunct, having joined the Democratic Party of Japan in 2003.

The party has been described as centre-right neoliberal, liberal, and classical libertarian.

== History ==
The Liberal Party was formed from remnants of the New Frontier Party after it dissolved in 1998. The party did do quite well for a new party, joining the opposition led by the Democratic Party of Japan (DPJ) and also including the New Kōmeitō, the Social Democratic Party and Japanese Communist Party, and thus helped contest elections against the ruling conservative Liberal Democratic Party (LDP).

In January 1999, it formed a coalition with the ruling LDP under Keizō Obuchi. Takeshi Noda as Minister for Home Affairs became its only member in the realigned Obuchi cabinet, later replaced by Toshihiro Nikai as Minister of Transportation. Later that year, the New Kōmeitō joined the coalition as well, and party president Ichirō Ozawa decided to lead the Liberal Party back into the opposition as he saw his party's position endangered. However, some members of the coalition wanted to stay in the government and eventually formed the breakaway New Conservative Party.

In October 2003, because of the upcoming election, the Liberal Party finally merged with the DPJ and all its members joined the new party, making an influential grouping within the party. The DPJ did tremendously well, and Hirohisa Fujii became the Secretary General of the Democratic Party of Japan, while Ichiro Ozawa led the Liberal Party faction within the DPJ. In 2016, the name was revived by Ozawa, on his renaming of the People's Life Party to the Liberal Party.

== Presidents of LP ==
No.	Name	Image	Term of office	
No.	Name	Image	Took office	Left office
Preceding party: New Frontier Party
1	Ichirō Ozawa		1 January 1998	26 September 2003
Successor party: Democratic Party (1998)

== Election results ==
=== General election results ===
Election	Leader	Constituency			Party list			Total	Position	Status
Election	Leader	Votes	%	Seats	Votes	%	Seats	Total	Position	Status
2000	Ichirō Ozawa	2,053,736	3.37	4 / 300	6,589,490	11.01	18 / 180	22 / 480	5th	Opposition

=== Councillors election results ===
Election	Leader	Constituency				Party list				Seats				Position	Status
Election	Leader	Votes	%	Seats	+/-	Votes	%	Seats	+/-	Election	+/-	Total	+/-	Position	Status
1998	Ichirō Ozawa	980,249	1.75	1 / 76	new	5,207,813	9.28	5 / 50	new	6 / 126	new	12 / 252	▲6	5th	Opposition
2001	Ichirō Ozawa	3,011,787	5.54	2 / 73	▲1	4,227,148	7.72	4 / 48	▼1	6 / 121	Steady	8 / 247	▼4	5th	Opposition
