= Obuchinomics =

Economic policies under the governments of Keizō Obuchi and Yoshirō Mori

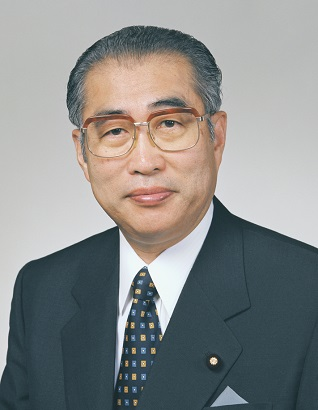
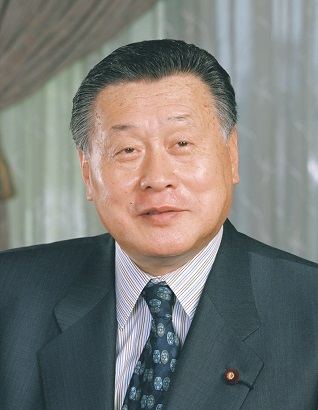
Keizō Obuchi and Yoshirō Mori, two proponents of Obuchinomics

Obuchinomics (Japanese: オブチノミクス) refers to the economic policies under the governments of Keizō Obuchi and Yoshirō Mori. Named after Obuchi, Obuchinomics is classical Keynesian to post-Keynesian and includes a centering on demand-side economics and the support of a market economy as well as the opening of markets to foreign competition, public spending and the support of stimulus policies and tax cuts. Obuchinomics under Obuchi also included fiscal populism and the concept of human security in the framework of economic development, supply-side economics, deregulation and privatization were also embraced in 1999. While it is seen as the opposite of Reaganomics it's supported government deficits like Reaganomics. Obuchinomics was regarded by Obuchi himself as a Japanese third way.

== Background ==
When Keizō Obuchi was still foreign minister, he was a supporter of the Vietnamese economic reforms named Đổi Mới. The predecessor of Obuchi, Ryutaro Hashimoto, was ideologically a neoliberal and anti-keynesian. Hashimoto advocated for neoliberal economic policies, but he also began to advocate in practice for classical keynesian economic policies like public spending after he was forced to do so. This said, he still opposed fiscal populism. Hashimoto resigned to take responsibility for the failure to the restore the LDP majority in the Upper House election in 1998. He was succeeded as LDP President and Prime Minister by Foreign Minister Keizō Obuchi.

== In practice (1998–2001) ==
=== Keizō Obuchi ===
In the beginning Keizō Obuchi and his government, still advocated for the neoliberal economic policies of the predecessor government, however the government moved away from them and began to advocate for keynesian economics. Obuchi was focused on reviving the Japanese economy of the Lost Decade. His solution to the latter was to increase public spending and lowering income taxes, which briefly slowed the recession but ultimately did very little to turn it around. One of his government actions was to give shopping coupons to 35 million citizens in the hope it would spark a consumer boom. Obuchi's fiscal policy focused on strengthening the core capital requirements for financial institutions while issuing more Japanese government bonds to finance public infrastructure, which boosted the rising Japanese public debt. The Obuchi administration embraced the nationalisation of failed banks. The results of Obuchinomics to revive the economy under him was mixed, while being seen as more positive than negative.

During Obuchi's term, Reuters reported that many Japanese citizens didn't understand the term.

=== Yoshirō Mori ===
After Obuchi fell in coma, Mikio Aoki became acting Prime Minister for three day's after this short acting period, Yoshirō Mori was appointed as Prime Minister. Mori said himself that he will continue the economic policies of Obuchi. Mori continued the keynesian economics of his predecessor. Mori proclaimed that he and his government will advocate for regulation reforms and improvement of social welfare, already Obuchi supported social welfare. During his campaign for the 2000 Japanese general election, Mori told that he supports public spending but also wants some deregulation like Obuchi.

== Aftermath ==
After Junichiro Koizumi was appointed as Prime Minister, he abandoned Obuchinomics and began to advocate for neoliberal economic policies, like the former prime ministers Yasuhiro Nakasone, Morihiro Hosokawa, Tsutomu Hata and Ryutaro Hashimoto.

== See also ==
- Abenomics
- Honebuto no hōshin
- Reaganomics
