= Yasushi Kaneko =

Japanese politician

Kaneko Yasushi
- 金子 恭之
- Official portrait, 2025

Minister of Land, Infrastructure, Transport and Tourism
- In office 21 October 2025 – 17 September 2026
- Prime Minister: Sanae Takaichi
- Preceded by: Hiromasa Nakano
- Succeeded by: Tatsunori Ibayashi

Minister for Internal Affairs and Communications
- In office 4 October 2021 – 10 August 2022
- Prime Minister: Fumio Kishida
- Preceded by: Ryota Takeda
- Succeeded by: Minoru Terada

Member of the House of Representatives
- Incumbent
- Assumed office 25 June 2000
- Preceded by: Masayoshi Yagami
- Constituency: Kumamoto 5th (2000–2017); Kumamoto 4th (2017–present)

Personal details
- Born: 27 February 1961 (age 65) Kuma, Kumamoto, Japan
- Party: Liberal Democratic
- Education: Waseda University

Yasushi Kaneko (金子 恭之, Kaneko Yasushi; born 27 February 1961) is a Japanese politician who served as Minister for Internal Affairs and Communications from October 2021 to August 2022. He is serving in the House of Representatives as a member of the Liberal Democratic Party.

== Career ==
A native of Kuma District, Kumamoto and graduate of Waseda University, Kaneko was elected for the first time in 2000 as an independent. He later joined the LDP.

His profile on the LDP website:

- Secretary to a Diet Member
- Parliamentary Secretary for Agriculture, Forestry and Fisheries (Koizumi Cabinet)
- Senior Vice-Minister of Land, Infrastructure and Transport (Fukuda and Aso Cabinet)
- Deputy Chairman, Policy Research Council of LDP
- Director, Youth Division of LDP
- Chairman, Committee on Land, Infrastructure, Transport and Tourism

== Positions ==
Kaneko is affiliated to the openly revisionist lobby Nippon Kaigi, and a member of the following right-wing groups at the Diet:

- Nippon Kaigi Diet discussion group (日本会議国会議員懇談会 - Nippon kaigi kokkai giin kondankai)
- Conference of parliamentarians on the Shinto Association of Spiritual Leadership (神道政治連盟国会議員懇談会) - NB: SAS a.k.a. Sinseiren, Shinto Political League, Shinto Seiji Renmei Kokkai Giin Kondankai
- Conference to consider the true human rights (真の人権擁護を考える懇談会)
- Conference of young parliamentarians supporting the idea that the Yasukuni Shrine is a true national interest and desire for peace (平和を願い真の国益を考え靖国神社参拝を支持する若手国会議員の会)

Kaneko gave the following answers to the questionnaire submitted by Mainichi to parliamentarians in 2012:

- in favor of the revision of the Constitution
- in favor of right of collective self-defense (revision of Article 9)
- in favor of reform of the National assembly (unicameral instead of bicameral)
- in favor of reactivating nuclear power plants
- against the goal of zero nuclear power by 2030s
- in favor of the relocation of Marine Corps Air Station Futenma (Okinawa)
- no answer regarding the evaluation of the purchase of Senkaku Islands by the Government
- in favor of an effort to avoid conflict with China
- against the participation of Japan to the Trans-Pacific Partnership
- against a nuclear-armed Japan
- against the reform of the Imperial Household that would allow women to retain their Imperial status even after marriage

== Scandals ==
=== Donation Transfer Scandal ===
In September 2002, it was reported that Kaneko had received a total of 10.4 million yen through a series of three transfers from the office of at the time LDP Secretary General Taku Yamasaki between October and December 2000. At that time, Kaneko was still an independent lawmaker, barred from receiving corporate donations. This money was donated by 36 builders near the planned Kawabe Dam project in the Kumamoto Prefecture, and transferred to Kaneko, who supported the project.

Political offices
Preceded by Ryota Takeda	Minister for Internal Affairs and Communications; 2021–2022	Succeeded by Minoru Terada
Preceded by Hiromasa Nakano	Minister of Land, Infrastructure, Transport and Tourism; 2025–present	Incumbent
Party political offices
Preceded by Yūko Obuchi	Chief of the Organisation and Movement Headquarters, Liberal Democratic Party; 2023–2024	Succeeded by Yūko Obuchi
House of Representatives (Japan)
Preceded by Shigeyuki Goto	Chairman of the Special Committee on Disaster Management and Reconstruction; 2024–2025	Succeeded by Ichiro Miyashita (Disaster)
Preceded by Shigeyuki Goto	Chairman of the Special Committee on Disaster Management and Reconstruction; 2024–2025	Succeeded by Kosaburo Nishime (Reconstruction)
