= Abenomics =

Japanese economic policy under Shinzo Abe

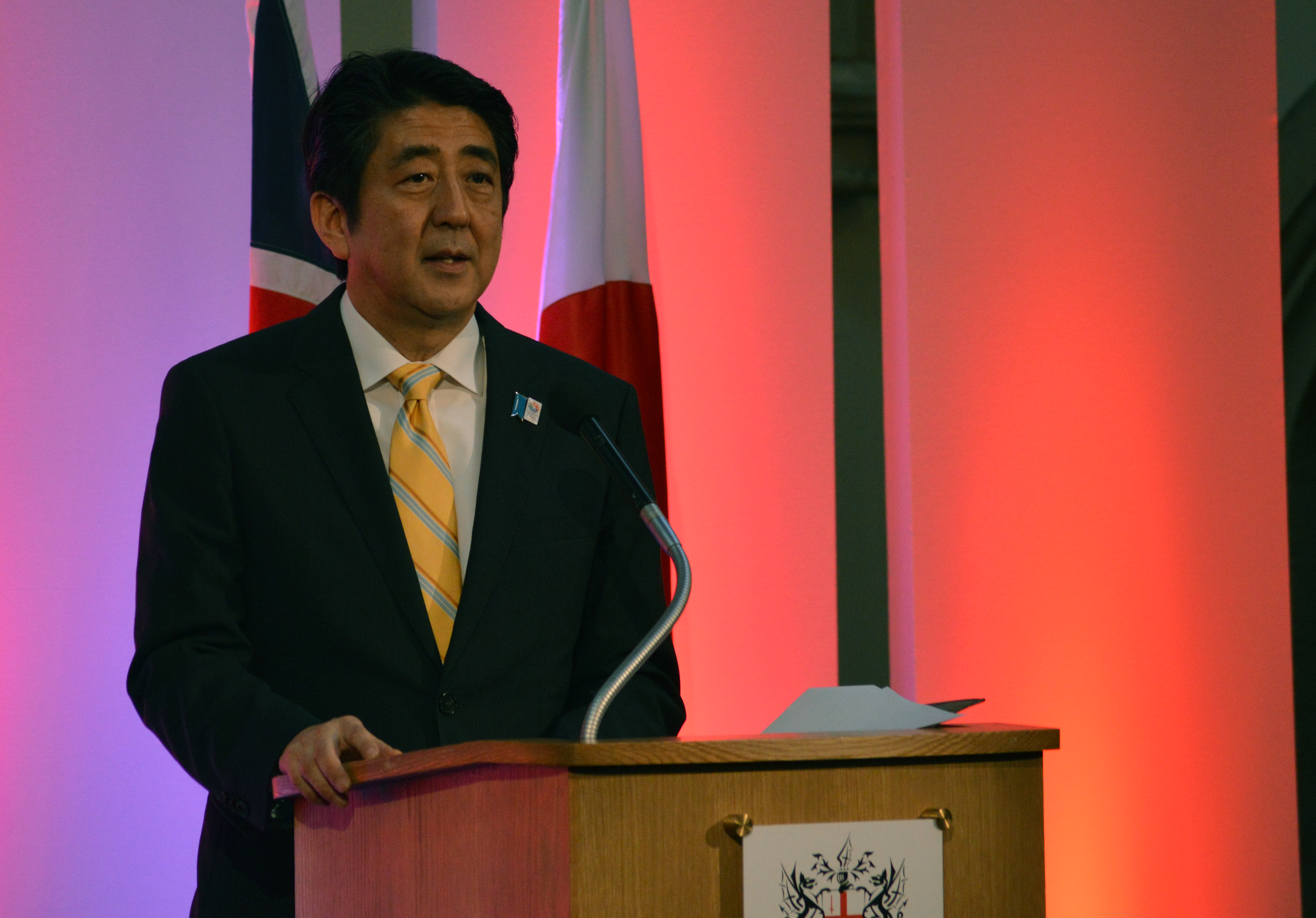
Prime Minister Abe discussing his economic policies in a speech in London, June 2013

Abenomics (アベノミクス, 安倍ノミクス, Abenomikusu) refers to the economic policies implemented by the Government of Japan led by the Liberal Democratic Party (LDP) since the 2012 general election. They are named after Shinzo Abe (1954–2022), the longest serving Prime Minister of Japan, governing from 2012 to 2020. After Abe resigned in September 2020, his successor, Yoshihide Suga, stated that his premiership would continue the policies and goals of the Abe administration, including the Abenomics suite of economic policies. Abenomics combines neoliberal elements and keynesian elements.

Abenomics is based upon "three arrows": monetary easing from the Bank of Japan, fiscal stimulus through government spending, and structural reforms. The Economist characterized the program as a "mix of reflation, government spending, and a growth strategy designed to jolt the economy out of suspended animation that has gripped it for more than two decades".

During Abe's tenure, the rate of Japan's nominal GDP growth was higher, and the ratio of government debt relative to national income stabilized for the first time in decades. However, the "third arrow" of structural reforms was not as effective as observers had hoped.

== Background ==
=== Japanese economic conditions prior to Abenomics ===
In 1996, GDP increased by 3%, recovering from a major asset-price bubble burst in the early 1990s. The Japanese government raised the consumption tax from 3% to 5% in April 1997, pledging further increases in 1998.

A financial crisis in East and South East Asia followed the collapse of the Thai Baht peg on July 2, 1997, with widespread consequences in the region. Government revenues decreased by 4.5 trillion yen as consumption faltered. Nominal GDP contracted for most of the five years following the tax hike. Japan's average annual wages grew between 1992 and 1997 but declined after the 1997 tax hike. Since 1997, wages have decreased faster than nominal GDP.

In 2012, the Diet of Japan under previous Prime Minister Yoshihiko Noda increased the consumption tax to 8% in 2014 and 10% in 2015 to balance the national budget; this tax hike was expected to further discourage consumption.

Raw data
Japanese nominal GDP and wages from 1992 to 2012 as a percentage of their values in 1997

=== World economic conditions prior to Abenomics ===
During the Great Recession, Japan suffered a 0.7% decline in real GDP in 2008, and a severe 5.2% decline in 2009. In contrast, world real GDP growth was 3.1% in 2008, with a 0.7% decline in 2009. Exports from Japan shrank from 746.5 billion in USD to 545.3 billion from 2008 to 2009, a 27% reduction. By 2013, nominal GDP in Japan was at the same level as 1991, while the Nikkei 225 stock market index was at a third of its peak.

=== Ideological basis of Abenomics ===
Abe's economic policy is also related to the rise of China as an economic and political power. Abe's supporters drew explicit parallels between Abenomics and the Meiji era program of fukoku kyōhei (enrich the country, strengthen the military). Strengthening the Japanese economy intended to counterweight to China in the Asia-Pacific region, and reduce Japan's reliance on the United States for defense.

Economic Outlook in Japan 1994–1999
Year	Nominal GDP (billions of yen)	NGDP Growth (%)	Unemployed persons (thousands)	Economically active population (thousands)	Unemployment (%)
1994	486526.3	1.19	1920	66450	2.88
1995	493271.7	1.38	2100	66660	3.15
1996	502608.9	1.89	2250	67110	3.35
1997	512248.9	1.91	2300	67870	3.38
1998	502972.8	-1.81	2790	67930	4.10
1999	495226.9	-1.54	3170	67790	4.67

Note: NGDP is valued at 2006 market prices

== Implementation ==
Abenomics consists of monetary policy, fiscal policy, and economic growth strategies to encourage private investment. Specific policies include inflation targeting at a 2% annual rate, correction of excessive yen appreciation, setting negative interest rates, radical quantitative easing, expansion of public investment, buying operations of construction bonds by the Bank of Japan (BOJ), and revision of the Bank of Japan Act. Fiscal spending increased by 2% of GDP, likely raising the deficit to 11.5% of GDP for 2013.

Two of the "three arrows" were implemented in the first weeks of Abe's government. Abe quickly announced a ¥10.3 trillion stimulus bill and appointed Haruhiko Kuroda to head the Bank of Japan with a mandate to generate a 2% target inflation rate through quantitative easing. But Kikuo Iwata, the deputy governor of the Bank of Japan, suggested that the BoJ does not strictly aim for the 2% price target in two years. Iwata implied that the BoJ would not loosen its monetary policy so soon after the increase in the sales tax in April 2014. Abe also pushed for Japanese participation in the Trans-Pacific Partnership.

The 2013 House of Councillors election gave Abe complete control over the Diet, but the government showed internal division over specific structural reforms. Certain cabinet members favored lower corporate taxes, while others feared political backlash for cutting taxes on large firms while raising taxes on consumers. Labor laws and rice production controls also became contentious issues within Abe's government.

=== Quantitative easing ===
On 4 April 2013, the BoJ announced its quantitative easing program, planning to purchase ¥60 to ¥70 trillion of bonds per year. This was raised to ¥80 trillion the following year.

== Effects ==
Abenomics immediately affected financial markets in Japan. By February 2013, the Japanese yen had dramatically weakened and the TOPIX stock market index had risen 22%. The unemployment rate in Japan continued falling from 4.0% in the final quarter of 2012 to 3.7% in the first quarter of 2013.

The yen became about 25% lower against the U.S. dollar in the second quarter of 2013 compared to the same period in 2012, with a highly loose monetary policy being followed. By May 2013, the stock market had risen by 55%, consumer spending had pushed first-quarter economic growth up 3.5% annually, and Shinzo Abe's approval rating ticked up to 70%. A Nihon Keizai Shimbun survey found that 74% of the respondents praised the policy for alleviating the prolonged recession.

Changes to wages and consumer sentiment were more muted. A Kyodo News poll in January 2014 found that 73% of Japanese respondents had not personally noticed the effects of Abenomics, only 28% expected to see a pay raise, and nearly 70% were considering cutting back spending following the increase in the consumption tax.

Under a weaker yen, Abenomics increased the cost of essential imports, including food, oil, and other natural resources. The Abe government viewed this as a temporary setback, believing the weaker yen would eventually increase export volumes. Japan also managed to maintain an overall current account surplus, bolstered by foreign investment income. However, the Japanese economy started contracting in the third quarter of 2018, the largest contraction in four years.

== Analysis ==
=== Austerity policies ===
BMI Research predicted the Japanese economy would fall into fiscal crisis before 2020 due to basic structural issues, including high government debt, worsening demographics, and loss of competitiveness in key industries. Anatole Kaletsky was an early supporter of Abenomics, but since the Japanese government raised the consumption tax rate to 10%, he expressed concerns that the tax hike could deal larger blow to the Japanese economy than expected. In 1997, the Japanese government raised the rate from 3% to 5% to tackle its debt (50% of GDP at the time), promising that the tax hike would be offset by income-tax reforms. However, the tax hike inhibited domestic consumption, pushing the economy into a deflationary trap and a recession. Due to the country's long-running malaise, gross public debt reached 200% of GDP, despite the sales tax increase. The International Monetary Fund (IMF) forecast that the tax hike would cut Japan's economic growth from 2.5% in 2013 to 1.4% in 2014, but Kaletsky argues that this economic downturn is underestimated.

In March 2014, at a conference in Abu Dhabi, Lawrence Summers expressed concern that the tax hike could damage the Japanese economy more seriously than early estimates. Although the Japanese government expected their economy to recover after a short recession, Summers suggested the rebound was overestimated.

Koichi Hamada, a monetary adviser for Shinzo Abe, warned that the planned value-added tax hike could hurt Japan's economy, which had started to recover from a long recession and deflation. He suggested the tax hike should be deferred to avoid discouraging consumption, adding that economists such as Jeffrey Frankel suggested a gradual one percent per-annum tax rate increase. Although Hamada was concerned about the effects of the tax hike, he expected monetary easing by the BoJ to offset its negative effects, applying the Mundell–Fleming model to Japan.

Depreciating a domestic currency can boost its exports if the Marshall–Lerner condition is met. If it is not, the trade balance initially becomes worse. All of Japan's nuclear power plants were shut down following the Fukushima nuclear accident in 2011, and Japan imported extra fossil fuels to make up for the lost power generation, worsening the country's trade deficit. Restarting the reactors was controversial; a nationwide poll showed that 76 percent either opposed nuclear power or wanted Japan to reduce its reliance on nuclear energy, while in some regions, such as communities close to Sendai, where nuclear power plants create jobs and relating subsidies are granted, restarting the reactors was widely supported. Without nuclear power, the Marshall–Lerner condition would not be met, due to a heavier dependence on fossil fuels and an increased reliance on imports.

=== Deflation ===
Martin Feldstein argued that consumption would be damaged by monetary ease policy by national bank, when the rise in prices is higher than the rise in wage.

Deflation causes consumers to expect goods and services to be cheaper in the future, discouraging present spending. In turn, this causes the economy to shrink, as consumer spending is vital. Richard Koo explained this phenomenon as the fallacy of composition, a situation, "in which behavior that is correct for individuals or companies has undesirable consequences when everyone engages in it."

Koo opposed the idea that Japan's aging population and decreasing labour force caused the country to suffer from chronic deflation. Population aging leads to a situation where the number of people (including retired people) who spend money becomes larger than that of people who work. He argued that demand should tend to exceed supply, and therefore population aging should be inflationary. Koo stated that the true driver of deflation was that Japanese companies were unwilling to borrow money and pay interest that the elderly obtain, which may discourage the elderly to spend.

Japan's nominal output decreased by more than $1 trillion, due to falling land prices and equity since 1990. Koo claimed that in human history, Japan was the only country suffering such a loss during peacetime. In a 2003 speech in Tokyo, Ben Bernanke suggested that the Bank of Japan should implement quantitative easing in order to put an end to the deflation spiral. 5 years after his speech, Bernanke started quantitative easing as chair of the US Federal Reserve, to fend off a Japanese-like lost decade due to a bubble in housing prices. The US central bank has since then bought financial assets like bank debt, mortgage backed securities, and US government bonds. This amounted to nearly US$4.5 trillion by 2015.

Japanese wages began to decrease from 1997 to 1998, and Hiroshi Yoshikawa, a professor at the University of Tokyo, said that Japan's tenacious deflation was caused by this decline. He argued that the monetary easing by the BoJ becomes powerless because the interest rate was already close to zero. Yoshikawa argued that the solution to beating the deflation is to push companies to pay their workers more. Kikuo Iwata, Etsuro Honda, and Koichi Hamada disagreed with Yoshikawa. Hamada said if the wages just increased, companies would become incapable of maintaining their current level of employment.

== Debate ==
=== Consumption tax increase ===
==== Support ====
LDP Secretary General Sadakazu Tanigaki held that it was difficult to cope with risks stemming from sidestepping the planned consumption tax hike to 10 percent, suggesting that the Japanese government should increase the tax rate as scheduled.

Haruhiko Kuroda, the governor of Bank of Japan, said that raising Japan's consumption tax is a confidence-building measure, and that the measure could stabilize the social security, which would strengthen Japan's economic growth. He stated that stagnation due to the tax hike would be temporary, while he mentioned the possible scenario in which the BoJ would additionally conduct quantitative easing. He warned that the cut of its corporation tax could worsen its fiscal position.

BoJ governor Kuroda argued that if the second hike was delayed, the markets would perceive that Japan is unlikely to tackle its government debt, and then the yields of the government bonds would soar. BoJ's former deputy governor, Kazumasa Iwata, said that if the second hike was put off, it could be permanently postponed, and it would become difficult to reach a new agreement on the schedule of the hike. He said that implementing stimulative measures was the only way to alleviate the tax hike's negative impact.

Hiroshi Yoshikawa was one of the strong supporters of the consumption tax hike to 10%; he maintained in late 2014 that there was no alternative.

==== Criticism ====
One BoJ board member expressed concern over the planned tax hike set to take effect in 2014 and 2015.

Economist Paul Krugman said that the consumption tax hike from 5% to 8% raised serious doubt about Japan's economic recovery, and that in order to lift the economy, the government should decrease the VAT to 5% and work to build up inflation expectations.

Lawrence Summers supported the view that the Japanese government should postpone the planned tax hike, suggesting that steady economic growth should be more important for the country than fiscal discipline. He said that if its economic growth accelerates, the world's third-largest economy can tame its government debt. He argued that fiscal policy is much more effective than monetary policy, because the former can inject income directly into the spending stream. When Summers was the US Deputy Secretary of the Treasury, he had argued that the Japanese government should not to raise the consumption tax rate from 3% to 5%. But the government raised the tax in 1997 for the purpose of balancing its budget. Although the country recorded a GDP growth rate of 3% in 1996, the economy sank into recession in 1998. On top of that, the revenue of the government decreased by 4.5 trillion yen in 1998, mainly because Japan's domestic consumption stumbled. Japan's tax revenue reached a peak of 53 trillion yen in FY 1997 and declined in subsequent years, being 42 trillion yen (US$537 billion) in 2012. Joseph Stiglitz similarly said that Japan's economy was still fragile, and the planned consumption tax hike from 5% to 8% would plunge it into recession.

The revenue of the Japanese government (trillion JPY)

=== Demand management ===
==== Support ====
The International Monetary Fund (IMF) characterized the program as "a unique opportunity to end decades-long deflation and sluggish growth and reverse the rise of public debt", but argued that "all three arrows need to be launched for the policies to succeed. Uncertainty about the ambition of fiscal and structural reforms is adding to underlying risks."

Economist Joseph Stiglitz explained how Shinzo Abe's programme for Japan's economic recovery has led to a surge in domestic confidence, and questioned how far Abe's "Abenomics" could claim credit. He referenced Momcilo Stanic, saying there is every reason to believe that Japan's strategy to revive and boost its economy will be a success.

The Washington Post journalist Neil Irwin cited successful expansion by Toyota, with operating profit rising 88% in the second quarter of 2013, as evidence that the economic program of Japan was working. He stated that "the fact that one of Japan's biggest and most important companies is again finding ways to make money on the homefront is a good sign that the nation's economic torpor may not last too much longer." He also argued that Abenomics could "change the economic psychology of Japan domestically" by providing export hikes through currency devaluation.

==== Criticism ====
King del Rosario argued that the policy is too focused on demand rather than supply, such as the case of the Japanese government's push for generic medicines within its universal healthcare system without actually addressing the root causes. Other critics argued that Japan's aging population would shrink the labor pool from year to year, which would not be addressed by Abenomics' proposals.

Goldman Sachs chief economist Naohiko Baba criticized the infrastructure spending component of Abenomics, arguing that the Japanese construction industry is inefficient and short of workers.

In January 2013, German Chancellor Angela Merkel said that the German people believed that central banks should not make up for bad political decisions, and she criticised Japan and the US for their expansionary monetary policies to enhance their competitiveness. Bundesbank chief Jens Weidmann accused the Japanese government of politicising exchange rates and threatening the independence of the central bank. The European Central Bank launched quantitative easing programmes of its own two years later.

=== Corporate tax cuts ===
==== Support ====
Koichi Hamada argued that Abenomics had a trickle-down effect on rest of the economy, responding to criticism that only big firms and the rich benefitted from it. He said that Japan needed to lower corporate taxes from about 35% (current level) to 24% to attract investment.

==== Criticism ====
Thomas Piketty said that Japan needed to change the structure of its taxation in order to help the Japanese young generation, suggesting it should increase taxes on the wealthy and big firms from 10% to 20%. He took the view that redistribution of wealth could be the fourth arrow of Abenomics and that raising the VAT was a bad way to reduce inequality in the country.

Joseph Stiglitz suggested that, even if tax cuts for the rich are done in US or UK, big firms just try to use them for their personal gains, not for raising wages of their employees.

== Results ==
There is no formal estimate of the results of Abenomics by the Japanese government.

=== GDP ===
The IMF affirmed that Japan's nominal GDP contracted by $1.8 trillion during 2012–2015, while real GDP contracted at an annual rate of 6.8 percent in the second quarter of 2014, after the consumption tax hike came into effect in April. It was the worst decline in GDP since the 2011 Tōhoku earthquake and tsunami, when the GDP shrank by an annualised 6.9%. This was later revised further to an annualised decline of 7.1%. In the third quarter of 2014, Japan's GDP shrank by an additional 1.6%, attributed to the consumption tax hike.

Household spending fell 5.9% in July 2014 from the same month a year earlier, more than the median forecast of economists polled by Reuters of a 3% drop, which analysts attributed to the higher consumption tax.

Economics minister Akira Amari said that the Japanese government would take necessary measures depending on its economic condition, although at that moment, he did not feel that those measures needed to be taken. Amari expressed confidence that the effect of the consumption tax hike began to wear off and that the economy would recover later in 2014.

Kyohei Morita and Yuichiro Nagai said they believed that Japan's real GDP would return to growth exceeding potential, mentioning economic indicators such as public works and housing construction orders.

While economists had predicted that the Japanese economy would grow by an annualised 2% in the third quarter of 2014, the country's GDP contracted at an annual rate of 1.6% in the quarter, putting the country's economy into a recession. Revised figures later that year said that Japan's GDP shrank at an annual rate of 1.9% in the third quarter of 2014. Business spending decreased by 0.4% from the previous quarter. Abe determined to call for a snap election to win a mandate to delay the second tax hike, which was scheduled to be done in 2015. Amari, however, said that there was a positive ongoing cycle in the economy and they could not sum it all up with the word recession, conceding that the consumption tax hike in April 2014 dented consumer spending.

The following figure compares the 1996-1999 period with the 2013-2015 period, in terms of Japan's real GDP. During the 1996-1999 period, the consumption tax was raised from 3 to 5%, and during the 2013-2015 period, the same tax was raised from 5% to 8%. For the 1996-1999 period, the GDP of the first quarter of 1996 is set to 100. For the 2013-2015 period, that of Q1 of 2013 is 100. The interval of the horizontal axis is one quarter, and the quarters when the consumption tax were raised are set to zero. Therefore, the GDPs of Q1 1996 and of Q1 2013 correspond to values evaluated at quarter -5.

Real GDP during 1996Q1-1999Q3 (index YR1996Q1 is 100)
Real GDP during 2013Q1-2015Q2 (index YR2013Q1 is 100)

In the first quarter of 2015, Japan's economy grew by 0.6% on a quarterly basis. Increases in inventories helped the economy to expand, but the momentum was lost in the second quarter.

The OECD reported in 2015 that Japan's real GDP is expected to expand by 0.7% that year. This growth rate was lower than US's 2.0 and UK's 2.4.

In the third quarter of 2015, the Japanese economy contracted 0.8% in annual terms and went into a technical recession as the real GDP shrank for two quarters consecutively. The GDP figure was worse than economists' forecast, which only estimated around 0.2% in the third quarter. This recession was its fifth recession since the Lehman shock occurred in 2008. But Amari seemed to be optimistic about the future of Abenomics, indicating that this technical recession would be temporary and that the economy was showing signs of continuous and gentle recovery.

==== Doubts cast regarding the accuracy of data ====
In 2021, the authenticity of Japan's GDP as a result of Abenomics was questioned, after it was revealed that the Japanese government overstated construction order data for years under the Abe government, a move that would effectively have inflated the Japanese GDP. There was evidence of double counting in the construction data.

=== Trade balance ===
As external demand on Japan's goods declined, Japan's exports fell 2.7% in May 2014 from the previous year. But its imports fell by 3.6% from a year before as well, which narrowed Japan's trade deficit by 8.3%. Japan's trade deficit with other countries was over 1 trillion yen in April 2014, and it went down to 909bn yen ($8.9bn, £5.2bn) in May 2014. The country ran a trade deficit for the 23rd straight month the next June.

=== Inflation targeting ===
In late January 2015, BoJ governor Haruhiko Kuroda admitted that the central bank would not achieve the 2% inflation target by April 2015, adding that he expected the price level to reach the target level in another 12 months. In February 2015, he said that the 'escape velocity' to lift the economy out of deflation needed to be "tremendous". Although he pledged to meet the target in 2013, the actual core CPI was 0.7% in January 2015. Oil prices were about US$100 in April 2014, and then they decreased about 50 percent by the end of 2014. Kuroda maintained that the decline in oil prices made it difficult for the BoJ to meet the target.

=== GDP deflation ===
Abenomics aimed at ending the deflation which had continued for more than 15 years, focusing on massive monetary stimulus to build up self-sustaining expectations of moderate inflation. But the expectations were dulled by the consumption tax hike, and the country eventually fell back into deflation. The growth rate of GDP deflator was minus 0.3% in the third quarter of 2014.

=== Labour market ===
As of 2019, Japan's unemployment rate was the lowest in the G7. Its employment rate for the working-age population (15–64) was the highest in the G7.

Labour force participation rate (15-64 age) in Japan, by sex

Unemployment rate of Japan

=== Impacts on the world economy ===
In early October 2014, the IMF revised its 2014 global growth forecast downwards, from 3.4% to 3.3%, although many central banks continued to provide liquidity to the world financial market. Weaker expansions in Japan, Latin America, and Europe worsened the outlook for the world economy.

In October 2014, the World Bank's chief economist Kaushik Basu said that the world economy was taking the risk of stagnation, adding that the Eurozone and Japan were the main slowdown areas.

The Eurozone has been brought to the verge of recession. Italy has suffered from recession for a long time, and France is forced to balance its budget by Germany despite the fact that its economy is depressed.

Japan, the world's third-largest economy, can likely to sink into recession due to the consumption tax hike. Although the IMF's previous forecast assumed that Japan would grow 1.6% in 2014, the forecast was revised downwards to 0.9%.

Regarding the impact upon the US economy, officials of the Federal Reserve Bank, including its second-in-command, said that global stagnation could cause the Federal Reserve Bank to be forced to postpone the planned interest rate hike. US Treasury Secretary Jacob Lew rejected the idea that the US alone could boost the world economy.

== Issues ==
While the Abe administration intended to increase government expenditure, the Ministry of Finance ordered Abe to use fiscal austerity measures.

The consumption tax hike from 5 to 8% brought about the self-induced recession in 2014, which discouraged Japanese consumers from spending and gave them a signal of further austerity. The tax hike seemed to start permanently damaging the Japanese economy. Japan's GDP contracted by 0.8% in annual terms in the third quarter of 2015, which made Japan go into a technical recession. Kozo Yamamoto, one of the creators of Abenomics, said that he was shocked by this contraction, and that the Japanese government should transfer money to those who do not benefit from Abenomics. He argued that it was necessary for the government to adopt an expansionary fiscal policy to lift the economy.

Japan's real GDP shrank at an annualised rate of 1.4% in the last quarter of 2015. Consumption, housing investment, and exports decreased in the final quarter, stoking fears of a second recession in 2016.

== See also ==
- Economy of Japan
- Economic history of Japan
- Obuchinomics
- Honebuto no hōshin
- Laffer curve
