= Sohei Miyashita =

Japanese politician (1927–2013)

- 宮下 創平
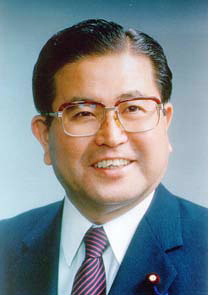
- Official portrait, 1998

Minister of Health and Welfare
- In office 30 July 1998 – 14 January 1999
- Prime Minister: Keizō Obuchi
- Preceded by: Junichirō Koizumi
- Succeeded by: Yuya Niwa

Director-General of the Environmental Agency
- In office 14 August 1994 – 8 August 1995
- Prime Minister: Tomiichi Murayama
- Preceded by: Shin Sakurai
- Succeeded by: Tadamori Oshima

Director-General of the Japan Defense Agency
- In office 5 November 1991 – 12 December 1992
- Prime Minister: Kiichi Miyazawa
- Preceded by: Yukihiko Ikeda
- Succeeded by: Toshio Nakayama

Member of the House of Representatives
- In office 7 October 1979 – 10 October 2003
- Preceded by: Kazuto Mukaiyama
- Succeeded by: Ichiro Miyashita
- Constituency: Nagano 3rd (1979–1996); Nagano 5th (1996–2003)

Personal details
- Born: 10 November 1927 Ina, Nagano, Japan
- Died: 7 October 2013 (aged 85) Tokyo, Japan
- Party: Liberal Democratic
- Children: Ichiro Miyashita
- Education: University of Tokyo

Sohei Miyashita (宮下 創平, Miyashita Sohei; 10 November 1927 – 7 October 2013) was a Japanese politician who served as Minister of Health and Welfare from 1998 to 1999, Director-General of the Environmental Agency from 1994 to 1995 and Director-General of the Defense Agency from 1991 to 1992.

A member of the Liberal Democratic Party, Miyashita served in the House of Representatives from 1979 to 2003.

== Biography ==
Miyashita was born in Nagano Prefecture on 10 November 1927 to a family of farmers. He attended the Imperial Japanese Army Academy, but after the academy was abolished under the American occupation he enrolled in the University of Tokyo. He joined the Ministry of Finance after graduating in 1951.

Miyashita had a long career in the Ministry. He was seconded as a secretary to the Chief Cabinet Secretary Shigeru Hori in 1968. He also worked as a budget examiner. He resigned from the Ministry to run in the 1979 House of Representatives election. He elected for the first time and would serve for seven terms.

Miyashita was a member of the Seiwakai within the Liberal Democratic Party. In December 1990 he became director of the LDP General Affairs Bureau, which handled election measures. Miyashita was appointed director general of the Japan Defense Agency in the cabinet of Prime Minister Kiichi Miyazawa on 5 November 1991, and served in the post until 12 December 1992.

Miyashita served as appointed director general of the Environmental Agency to the cabinet led by Prime Minister Tomiichi Murayama from August 1994 to August 1995. Miyashita succeeded Shin Sakurai in the post when the latter resigned from office due to his statements about the role of Japan in World War II.

Miyashita was made subcommitee chairman of the LDP Tax Commission in November 1996 and remained until he was appointed minister of health and welfare in the cabinet of Prime Minister Keizō Obuchi. He left in January 1999 and was again made subcommitee chairman of the LDP Tax Commission in July 2000. He continued in that role until his retired from politics by not running in the 2003 election. His son Ichiro Miyashita was elected in his stead.

Miyashita died of pneumonia in Tokyo on 7 October 2013.

House of Representatives (Japan)
Preceded by Eiji Nonaka	Chair, House of Representatives Audit Committee; 1988–1989	Succeeded by Yasushi Nakamura
Political offices
Preceded by Yukihiko Ikeda	Head of the Japan Defense Agency; 1991–1992	Succeeded by Toshio Nakayama
Preceded by Shin Sakurai	Head of the Environmental Agency; 1994–1995	Succeeded by Tadamori Oshima
Preceded by Junichiro Koizumi	Minister of Health and Welfare; 1998–1999	Succeeded by Yuya Niwa
Party political offices
Preceded by Sadatoshi Ozato	Director of the General Affairs Bureau, Liberal Democratic Party; 1990–1991	Succeeded by Hiromu Nonaka
Preceded by Yoshiro Hayashi	Subcommittee Chairman of the Tax Research Commission, Liberal Democratic Party; 1996–1998	Succeeded by Yuji Tsushima
Preceded by Yuji Tsushima	Subcommittee Chairman of the Tax Research Commission, Liberal Democratic Party; 2000–2003	Succeeded by Nobutaka Machimura
Non-profit organization positions
Preceded by Ryuzo Sejima	Chairman of the Chidorigafuchi National Cemetery Memorial Foundation; 2007–2013	Succeeded by Mitsuo Horiuchi
