= Mie 5th district =

Japanese legislature constituency

- Former Parliamentary constituency for the Japanese House of Representatives
- Prefecture: Mie
- Proportional District: Tōkai

Former constituency
- Created: 1994
- Abolished: 2017
- Seats: One
- Party: ー
- Representative: ー

Mie 5th district (三重県第5区, Mie-ken dai-goku or simply 三重5区, Mie-goku ) was a single-member constituency of the House of Representatives in the national Diet of Japan located in Mie Prefecture.

== Areas covered ==
=== 2013–2017 ===
- Ise
- Kumano
- Owase
- Toba
- Shima
- Kitamuro District
- Minamimuro District
- Watarai District

=== 1994–2013 ===
- Ise
- Kumano
- Owase
- Toba
- Kitamuro District
- Minamimuro District
- Watarai District
- Shima District

== List of representatives ==
Election	Representative	Party	Notes
1996	Takao Fujinami	Liberal Democratic	
2000	Takao Fujinami	Independent	
2003	Norio Mitsuya	Liberal Democratic	
2005	Norio Mitsuya	Liberal Democratic	
2009	Norio Mitsuya	Liberal Democratic	
2012	Norio Mitsuya	Liberal Democratic	
2014	Norio Mitsuya	Liberal Democratic	

== Election results ==
2014
Party	Candidate	Votes	%	±%
Liberal Democratic (endorsed by Komeito)	Norio Mitsuya (incumbent)	86,104	54.44	
Democratic	Daisuke Fujita	58,884	37.23	
Communist	Koichi Naitō	13,170	8.33	
Majority		27,220	17.21	
Registered electors		276,155		
Turnout			58.62	▼4.65
LDP hold				

2012
Party	Candidate	Votes	%	±%
Liberal Democratic (endorsed by Komeito)	Norio Mitsuya (incumbent)	101,327	58.87	
Democratic	Daisuke Fujita (PR seat incumbent)	56,489	32.82	
Communist	Koichi Naitō	14,293	8.30	N/A
Majority		44,838	26.05	
Registered electors		281,210		
Turnout			63.27	▼10.82
LDP hold				

2009
Party	Candidate	Votes	%	±%
Liberal Democratic	Norio Mitsuya (incumbent)	105,188	49.90	
Democratic (endorsed by PNP)	Daisuke Fujita (won PR seat)	102,377	48.57	
Happiness Realization	Shinobu Ōhara	3,228	1.53	New
Majority		2,811	0.33	
Registered electors		289,477		
Turnout			74.09	▲2.14
LDP hold				

2005
Party	Candidate	Votes	%	±%
Liberal Democratic	Norio Mitsuya (incumbent)	117,768	55.94	
Democratic	Yoichi Kaneko	83,737	39.78	
Communist	Miyoshi Taninaka	9,003	4.28	
Majority		34,031	16.16	
Registered electors		297,377		
Turnout			71.95	▲5.56
LDP hold				

2003
Party	Candidate	Votes	%	±%
Liberal Democratic	Norio Mitsuya	111,840	57.66	N/A
Democratic	Yoichi Kaneko	71,937	37.09	
Communist	Masaharu Nagasaka	8,251	4.25	
Independent	Seiichi Yamanaka	1,928	0.99	New
Majority		39,903	20.57	
Registered electors		299,411		
Turnout			66.39	▲1.92
LDP hold				

2000
Party	Candidate	Votes	%	±%
Independent	Takao Fujinami (incumbent)	85,254	46.17	New
Democratic	Takeshi Yamamura (won PR seat)	82,222	44.53	New
Communist	Kiyoharu Kuroki	17,168	9.30	
Majority		3,032	1.64	
Registered electors		301,489		
Turnout			64.47	▲6.01
LDP hold				

1996
Party	Candidate	Votes	%	±%
Liberal Democratic	Takao Fujinami	115,959	72.79	New
Communist	Kiyoharu Kuroki	43,344	27.21	New
Majority		72,615	45.58	
Registered electors		301,765		
Turnout			58.46	
LDP win (new seat)				
