= Koji Sato (politician) =

Japanese politician (born 1959)

- 佐藤 公治
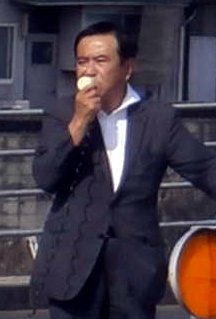
- Sato in 2013

Member of the House of Representatives
- In office 22 October 2017 – 23 January 2026
- Preceded by: Shizuka Kamei
- Succeeded by: Shin Yamamoto
- Constituency: Hiroshima 6th (2017–2024); Hiroshima 5th (2024–2026)
- In office 25 June 2000 – 8 August 2005
- Preceded by: Mutsuki Kato
- Succeeded by: Mitsuo Mitani
- Constituency: Chūgoku PR

Member of the House of Councillors
- In office 29 July 2007 – 28 July 2013
- Preceded by: Takeaki Kashimura
- Succeeded by: Shinji Morimoto
- Constituency: Hiroshima at-large

Personal details
- Born: 28 July 1959 (age 67) Mukaishima, Hiroshima, Japan
- Party: CRA (since 2026)
- Other political affiliations: NFP (1994–1998); LP (1998–2003); DPJ (2003–2012); TPJ (2012); PLF (2012–2017); KnT (2017–2018); Independent (2018–2020); CDP (2020–2026)
- Education: Keio University

Koji Sato (佐藤 公治, Satō Kōji; born 28 July 1959) is a Japanese politician.

== Overview ==
He is a politician of the Democratic Party of Japan (DPJ), a member of the House of Councillors in the Diet (national legislature). A native of Mitsugi District, Hiroshima and graduate of Keio University, he was elected to the House of Representatives for the first time in 2000 as a member of Ichirō Ozawa's Liberal Party after running unsuccessfully in 1996 as a member of the New Frontier Party. After the Liberal Party merged with the DPJ, he won the 2003 re-election but lost the 2005 re-election. In 2007, he was elected to the House of Councillors for the first time.
