= Norio Mitsuya =

Japanese politician

- 三ッ矢 憲生
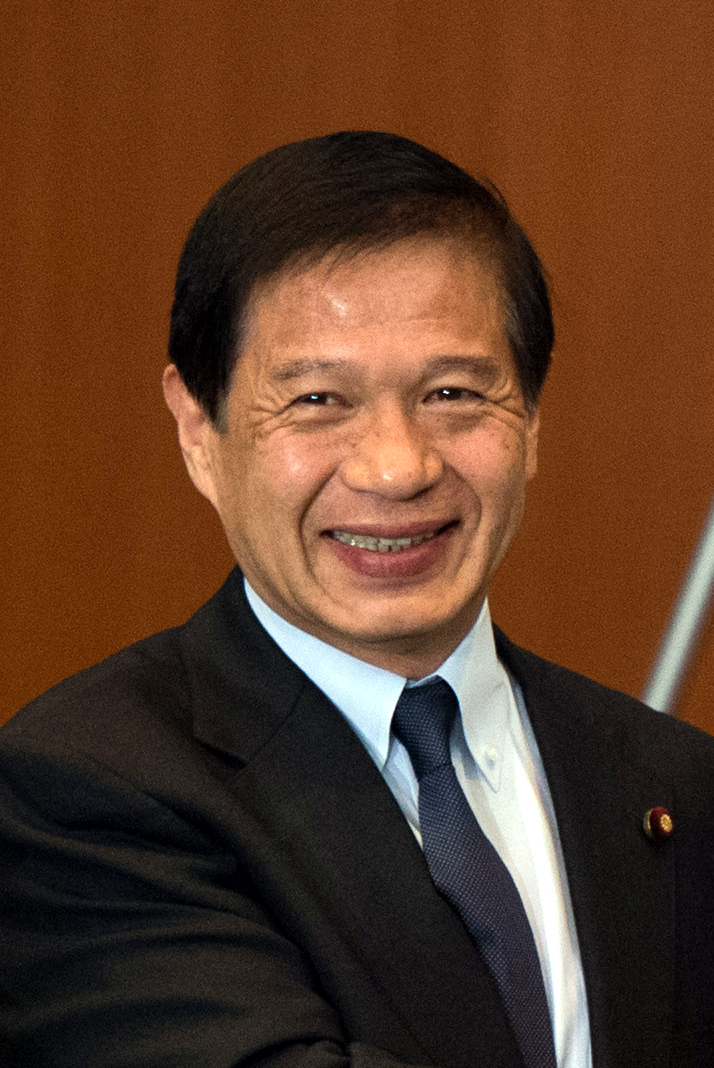
- Mitsuya in 2014

Member of the House of Representatives
- In office 10 November 2003 – 14 October 2021
- Preceded by: Takao Fujinami
- Succeeded by: Eikei Suzuki
- Constituency: Mie 5th (2003–2017); Mie 4th (2017–2021)

Personal details
- Born: 13 December 1950 (age 75) Ise, Mie, Japan
- Party: Liberal Democratic
- Education: Tokyo University; Columbia University

Norio Mitsuya (三ッ矢 憲生, Mitsuya Norio; born 13 December 1950) is a Japanese former politician, belonging to the Liberal Democratic Party. He is a former member of the House of Representatives in the Diet (national legislature).

== Early life ==
Mitsuya is a native of Ise, Mie. He graduated from the University of Tokyo. After university, he joined the Ministry of Transport, attending Columbia University in the United States while in the ministry.

== Political career ==
Mitsuya was elected to the House of Representatives for the first time in 2003, serving six terms until 2021.
