= Yukihiko Ikeda =

Japanese politician (1937–2004)

- 池田 行彦
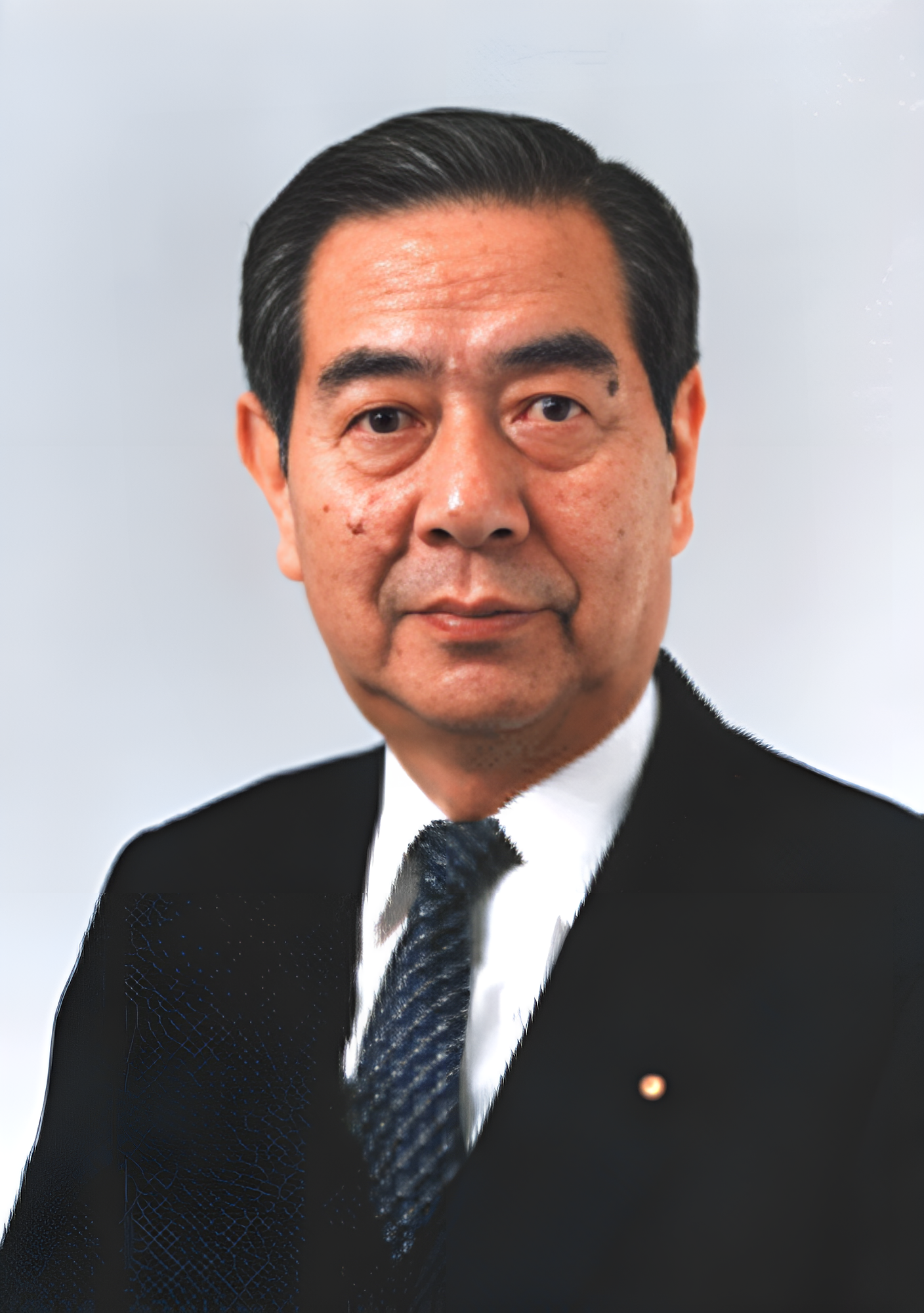
- Official portrait, 1996

Minister for Foreign Affairs
- In office 11 January 1996 – 11 September 1997
- Prime Minister: Ryutaro Hashimoto
- Preceded by: Yōhei Kōno
- Succeeded by: Keizō Obuchi

Director-General of the Japan Defense Agency
- In office 29 December 1990 – 5 November 1991
- Prime Minister: Toshiki Kaifu
- Preceded by: Yozo Ishikawa
- Succeeded by: Sohei Miyashita

Director-General of the Management and Coordination Agency
- In office 3 June 1989 – 10 August 1989
- Prime Minister: Sōsuke Uno
- Preceded by: Saburō Kanemaru
- Succeeded by: Kiyoshi Mizuno

Deputy Chief Cabinet Secretary (Political affairs)
- In office 30 November 1981 – 27 November 1982
- Prime Minister: Zenkō Suzuki
- Preceded by: Riki Kawara
- Succeeded by: Takao Fujinami

Member of the House of Representatives
- In office 10 December 1976 – 28 January 2004
- Preceded by: Yōzō Katō
- Succeeded by: Minoru Terada
- Constituency: Hiroshima 2nd (1976–1996); Hiroshima 5th (1996–2004)

Personal details
- Born: 13 May 1937 Kobe, Hyōgo, Japan
- Died: 28 January 2004 (aged 66) Chiyoda, Tokyo, Japan
- Party: Liberal Democratic
- Spouse: Noriko Ikeda
- Children: 3
- Relatives: Hayato Ikeda (father-in-law)
- Education: University of Tokyo

Yukihiko Ikeda (池田 行彦, Ikeda Yukihiko; 13 May 1937 – 28 January 2004) was a Japanese bureaucrat and the Liberal Democratic Party (LDP) politician who served as the Minister for Foreign Affairs from 1996 to 1997. Ikeda was known to be "Mr. No" in the political life.

== Early life and education ==
Ikeda was born in Kobe, Hyōgo Prefecture, on 13 May 1937. Following the death of his father in 1944, he moved to Nakajima Honmachi, Hiroshima where his father's family lived. Ikeda studied law at the University of Tokyo and graduated in March 1961.

== Career ==
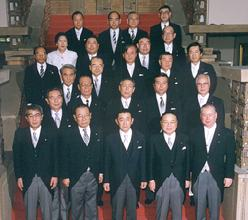
Ikeda with members of First Hashimoto Cabinet (at the Prime Minister's Official Residence on 11 January 1996)

Ikeda joined the Ministry of Finance in 1961 and worked as bureaucrat there. Then he became a member of the House of Representatives in 1976 following his membership to the LDP. He won the largest number of votes (55,027) in Hiroshima Prefecture's 2nd electoral district in the 1976 general election. He served as a lawmaker ten times until his retirement. He held key positions in the LDP and was the director general of the Defense Agency. His other posts included chairman of the LDP's decision-making general council and head of the policy research council. He was appointed defense minister on 29 December 1990, replacing Yozo Ishikawa in the post. He served in the post until 5 November 1991 and was succeeded by Sohei Miyashita.

Ikeda's second tenure as foreign minister was from 11 January 1996 to 11 September 1997 in the coalition government headed by Ryutaro Hashimoto. Ikeda replaced Yōhei Kōno as foreign minister. Upon the construction of a wharf facility in Takeshima/Dokdo by the South Korean government at the beginning of 1996, Ikeda protested over the construction and demanded that the South Korean government should stop it. His remarks led to angry public demonstrations in Seoul. He led Japan's attempts to solve the hostage crisis in Peru in the 1990s. Ikeda was replaced by Keizō Obuchi as foreign minister on 11 September 1997.

Later Ikeda became the policy chief or top policy planner of the LDP in 1998. He was part of Koichi Kato's faction in the LDP.

== Personal life and death ==
Ikeda was son-in-law of former Japanese prime minister Hayato Ikeda. He married Noriko Ikeda in May 1969, and took his wife's family name.

Ikeda died of rectum cancer in Tokyo on 28 January 2004 at age 66.

== Honours ==
From the corresponding article in the Japanese Wikipedia

- Senior Third Rank
- Grand Cordon of the Order of the Rising Sun

House of Representatives (Japan)
Preceded by Junichiro Koizumi	Chair, House of Representatives Committee on Financial Affairs; 1986–1987	Succeeded by Michio Ochi
Preceded by Hisao Horinouchi	Chair, House of Representatives Committee on Fundamental National Policies; 2002	Succeeded by Tsutomu Kawara
Political offices
Preceded by Tsutomu Kawara	Deputy Chief Cabinet Secretary; 1981–1982	Succeeded by Takao Fujinami
Preceded by Saburō Kanemaru	Head of the Management and Coordination Agency; 1989	Succeeded by Kiyoshi Mizuno
Preceded by Yozo Ishikawa	Head of the Japan Defense Agency; 1990–1991	Succeeded by Sohei Miyashita
Preceded by Yōhei Kōno	Minister for Foreign Affairs; 1996–1997	Succeeded by Keizō Obuchi
Party political offices
Preceded by Taku Yamasaki	Chair, Liberal Democratic Party Policy Research Council; 1998–1999	Succeeded by Shizuka Kamei
Preceded by Takashi Fukaya	Chair, Liberal Democratic Party General Council; 1999–2000	Succeeded by Sadatoshi Ozato
