= Takao Fujinami =

Japanese politician (1932–2007)

- 藤波 孝生

Chief Cabinet Secretary
- In office 27 December 1983 – 28 December 1985
- Prime Minister: Yasuhiro Nakasone
- Preceded by: Masaharu Gotōda
- Succeeded by: Masaharu Gotōda

Deputy Chief Cabinet Secretary (Political affairs)
- In office 27 November 1982 – 27 December 1983
- Prime Minister: Yasuhiro Nakasone
- Preceded by: Yukihiko Ikeda
- Succeeded by: Toyohiko Mizuhira

Minister of Labour
- In office 9 November 1979 – 17 July 1980
- Prime Minister: Masayoshi Ōhira
- Preceded by: Yūkō Kurihara
- Succeeded by: Masayuki Fujio

Member of the House of Representatives
- In office 21 October 1996 – 10 October 2003
- Preceded by: Constituency established
- Succeeded by: Norio Mitsuya
- Constituency: Mie 5th
- In office 30 January 1967 – 18 June 1993
- Preceded by: Bunpei Hamachi
- Succeeded by: Seat abolished
- Constituency: Mie 2nd

Personal details
- Born: 3 December 1932 Watarai, Mie, Japan
- Died: 28 October 2007 (aged 74) Mie Prefecture, Japan
- Party: Liberal Democratic
- Education: Waseda University

Takao Fujinami (藤波 孝生, Fujinami Takao) (December 3, 1932 – October 28, 2007) was a Japanese politician who served as the Chief Cabinet Secretary from 1983 to 1985. He also served as a member of the House of Representatives from 1967 to 1993, and again from 1996 to 2003.

Born in Ise, Mie Prefecture, Fujinami was first elected to the House of Representatives in 1967 as a Liberal Democratic Party member, and was elected to the House of Representatives eleven times.

Fujinami first obtained a Cabinet post in 1979 as Labor Minister under Prime Minister Masayoshi Ohira when he was serving his fifth term as a House of Representatives member.

When the Nakasone government began in 1982, Fujinami was given the post of deputy chief Cabinet secretary before becoming chief Cabinet secretary in 1983. Fujinami was seen as a prospective prime minister while serving in the post of chief Cabinet secretary from 1983 to 1985, under Prime Minister Nakasone. During his two years as chief Cabinet secretary, he helped promote Nakasone's policies, including his official visit to Yasukuni Shrine and the cancellation of the cap on Japan's defense budget of one percent of the gross national product. He also helped with Nakasone's administrative reforms, including the privatization of telephone operation and tobacco businesses.

Fujinami resigned due to his involvement in the Recruit Company shares-for-favor scandal in the late 1980s. After Nakasone left the post of prime minister in 1987 and returned to the head of an LDP faction, Fujinami supported him as secretary general of the faction.

In 1989, Fujinami was indicted on charges of accepting more than 40 million yen in money and unlisted shares as bribes from Recruit, a Tokyo-based job information conglomerate. The Tokyo District Court acquitted Fujinami in 1994, but the Tokyo High Court reversed the decision in 1997, sentencing him to three years in prison, suspended for four years. The decision was finalized by the Supreme Court in 1999.

Fujinami retired from politics in 2003 citing health reasons. He died at a hospital in Mie Prefecture, according to the LDP.

Political offices
Preceded by Yūkō Kurihara	Minister of Labour; 1979–1980	Succeeded by Masayuki Fujio
Preceded by Yukihiko Ikeda	Deputy Chief Cabinet Secretary; 1982–1983	Succeeded by Toyohiko Mizuhira
Preceded by Masaharu Gotōda	Chief Cabinet Secretary; 1983–1985	Succeeded by Masaharu Gotōda
Party political offices
Preceded by Takami Eto	Chairman of the Diet Affairs Committee, Liberal Democratic Party; 1985–1987	Succeeded by Kozo Watanabe
