= Yozo Ishikawa =

Japanese politician (1925–2014)

- 石川 要三
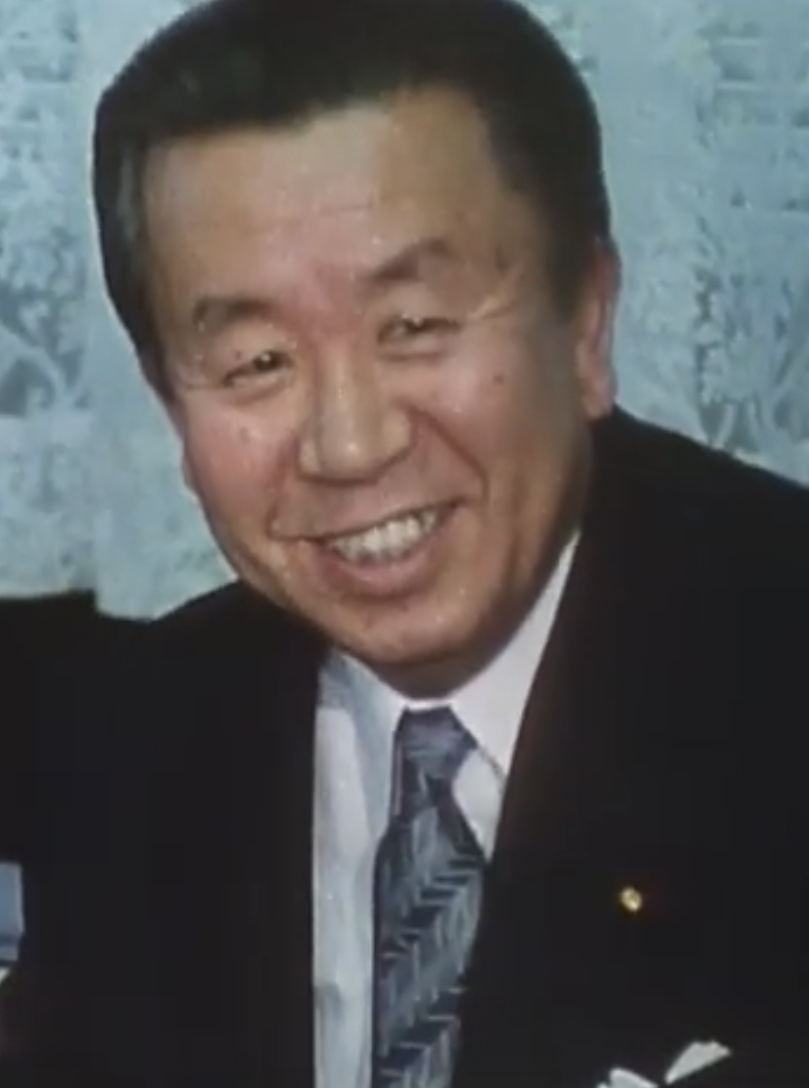
- Ishikawa in 1990

Director-General of the Japan Defense Agency
- In office 28 February 1990 – 29 December 1990
- Prime Minister: Toshiki Kaifu
- Preceded by: Juro Matsumoto
- Succeeded by: Yukihiko Ikeda

Member of the House of Representatives
- In office 21 October 1996 – 10 October 2003
- Preceded by: Constituency established
- Succeeded by: Shinji Inoue
- Constituency: Tokyo 25th
- In office 10 December 1976 – 18 June 1993
- Preceded by: Constituency established
- Succeeded by: Tatsuya Ito
- Constituency: Tokyo 11th

Mayor of Ōme
- In office 1967–1975
- Preceded by: Eizō Enomoto
- Succeeded by: Masao Yamazaki

Personal details
- Born: 6 July 1925 Nishitama, Tokyo, Japan
- Died: 21 June 2014 (aged 88) Ōme, Tokyo, Japan
- Party: Liberal Democratic
- Education: Waseda University

Yozo Ishikawa (石川 要三, Ishikawa Yōzō; 6 July 1925 – 21 June 2014) was a Japanese lawmaker and a member of the Liberal Democratic Party (LDP). He served as director general of the now-defunct defense agency of Japan in 1990.

== Career ==
Ishikawa was a member of the LDP and was part of a group headed by Yōhei Kōno in the party. He served in the House of Representatives from 1976 to 1993, and again from 1996 to 2003.

In 1983, Ishikawa was parliamentary vice minister for foreign affairs. In 1984, he served as the chairman of LDP's diplomacy committee. On 28 February 1990 he was appointed defense minister in the cabinet led by Prime Minister Toshiki Kaifu, replacing Juro Matsumoto in the post. Ishikawa's tenure was very brief and on 29 December of the same year he was replaced by Yukihiko Ikeda in the post. After that, Ishikawa led the LDP's Tokyo chapter.

Ishikawa died on 21 June 2014 from acute respiratory failure after being hospitalized with pneumonia.

== Honours ==
- Thailand :
  - Knight Grand Cross of the Order of the White Elephant (1990)
