= Masayuki Fujio =

Japanese politician

- 藤尾 正行
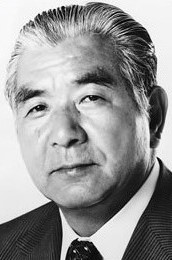

Minister of Education
- In office 22 July 1986 – 9 September 1986
- Prime Minister: Yasuhiro Nakasone
- Preceded by: Toshiki Kaifu
- Succeeded by: Masajuro Shiokawa

Minister of Labour
- In office 17 July 1980 – 30 November 1981
- Prime Minister: Zenkō Suzuki
- Preceded by: Takao Fujinami
- Succeeded by: Takiichiro Hatsumura

Member of the House of Representatives
- In office 22 November 1963 – 27 September 1996
- Preceded by: Kōichi Yamaguchi
- Succeeded by: Constituency abolished
- Constituency: Tochigi 2nd

Personal details
- Born: 1 January 1917 Tokyo, Japan
- Died: 22 October 2006 (aged 89) Tokyo, Japan
- Party: Liberal Democratic
- Education: Meiji University

Masayuki Fujio (藤尾 正行 Fujio Masayuki, January 1, 1917 – October 22, 2006) was the Japanese Minister of Education, under the government of Yasuhiro Nakasone until 1986. He was a member of the right-wing Seiwa Seisaku Kenkyūkai faction of the Liberal Democratic Party, where he was described as being a "loyal vassal" to Takeo Fukuda, the founder of the faction.

In 1986, Fujio was made Minister of Education by Prime Minister Nakasone, but he was soon fired by Nakasone after an interview with Bungei Shunju in which he made several controversial remarks about Japan's role in the Second Sino-Japanese War and World War II. In the interview, Fujio questioned the criminality of the Nanjing Massacre, claiming "It is not murder under international law to kill in war". Further, he compared the Nanjing Massacre with the atomic bombings of Hiroshima and Nagasaki and implied that if Japan's war time actions were wrong then so were America's.

Fujio died of pneumonia on October 22, 2006 at the age of 89.

Political offices
Preceded by Takao Fujinami	Minister of Labour; 1980–1981	Succeeded by Takiichiro Hatsumura
Preceded by Toshiki Kaifu	Minister of Education; 1986	Succeeded by Masajuro Shiokawa
Assembly seats
Preceded by Jitsuzo Tokuyasu	Chair, Cabinet Affairs Committee of the House of Representatives of Japan; 1975–1976	Succeeded by Yoshimasa Sakamura
Preceded by Jujiro Tosaka	Chair, Education Committee of the House of Representatives of Japan; 1976–1978	Succeeded by Shigeru Suganami
Party political offices
Preceded by Rokusuke Tanaka	Chairman of the Policy Research Council, Liberal Democratic Party; 1983–1986	Succeeded by Masayoshi Ito
