= Shinji Inoue =

Japanese politician

- 井上 信治
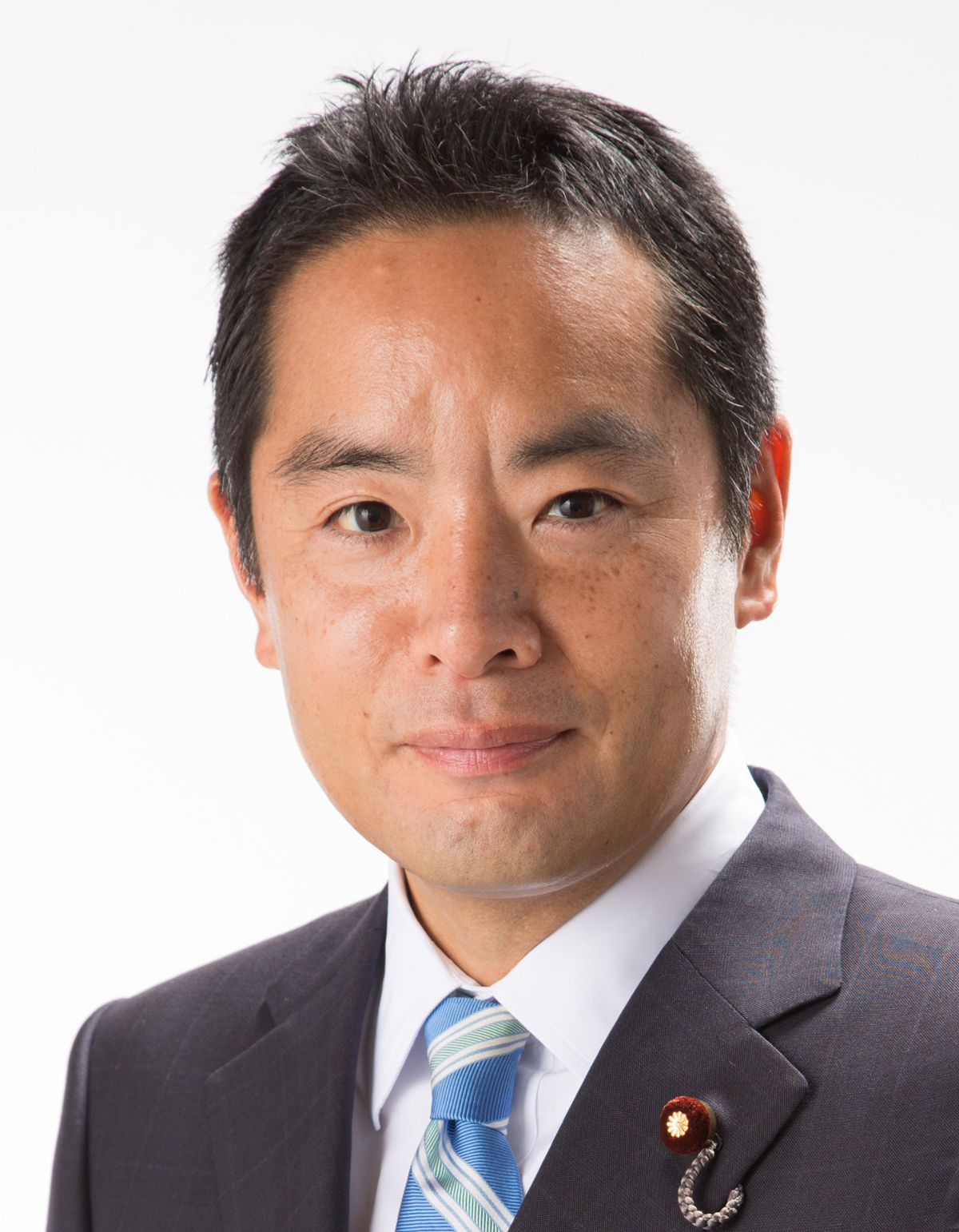
- Official portrait, 2020

Minister of State (Consumer Affairs and Food Safety, Science and Technology Policy) Minister in charge of International Exposition
- In office 16 September 2020 – 4 October 2021
- Prime Minister: Yoshihide Suga
- Preceded by: Seiichi Eto
- Succeeded by: Kenji Wakamiya

Member of the House of Representatives
- Incumbent
- Assumed office 10 November 2003
- Preceded by: Yozo Ishikawa
- Constituency: Tokyo 25th

Personal details
- Born: 7 October 1969 (age 56) Chiyoda, Tokyo, Japan
- Party: Liberal Democratic (Shikōkai)
- Education: Tokyo University; University of Cambridge

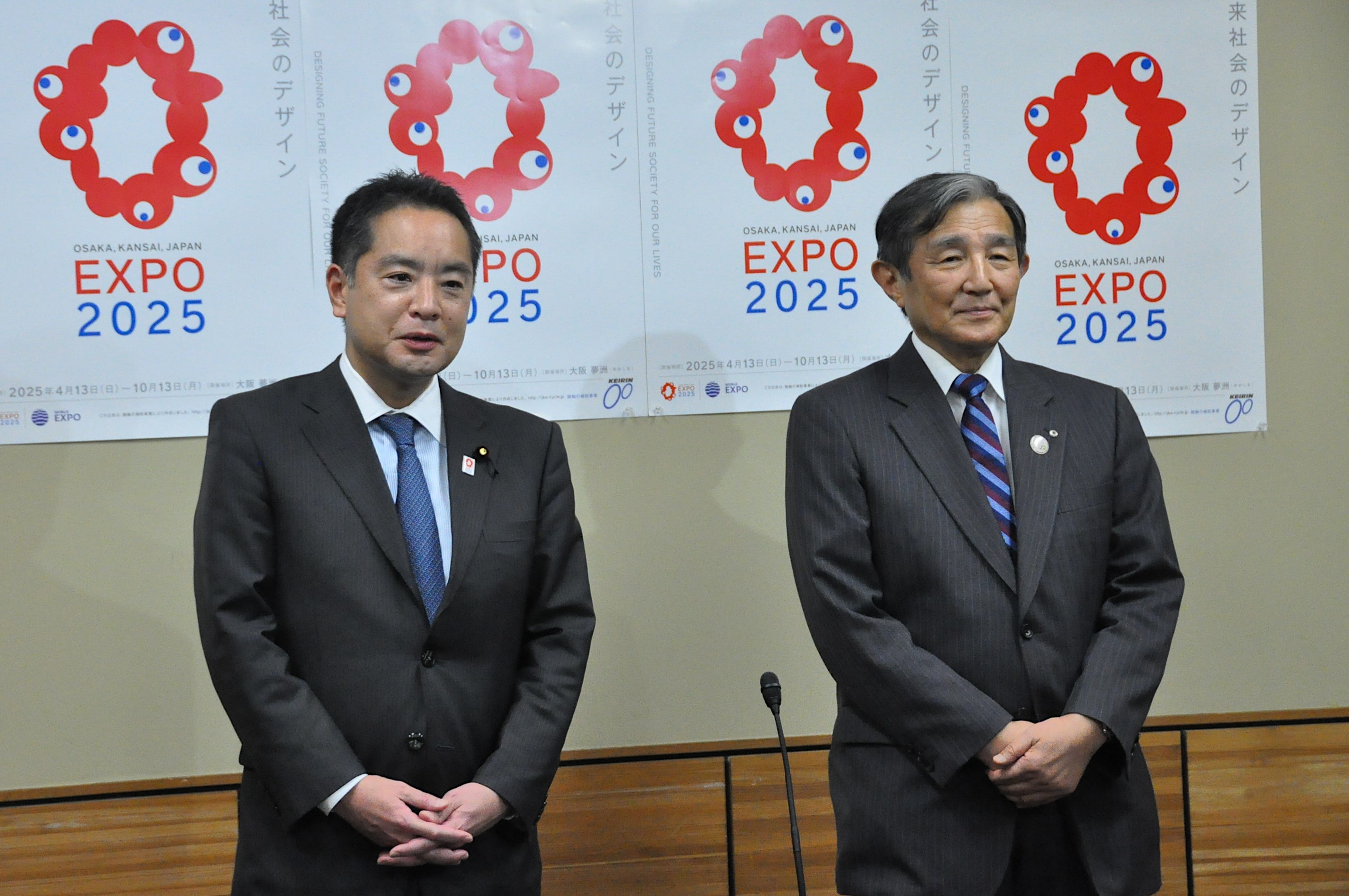
Shinji Inoue, Minister of State for "Cool Japan" Strategy, met Yoshinobu Nisaka, Governor of Wakayama Prefecture, at Wakayama Prefectural Government Building in Wakayama City, Wakayama Prefecture on October 20, 2020.

Shinji Inoue (井上 信治, Inoue Shinji; born 7 October 1969) is a Japanese politician of the Liberal Democratic Party and a member of the House of Representatives in the Diet (national legislature).

== Early life ==
Inoue is a native of Chiyoda, Tokyo and a graduate of the University of Tokyo. He joined the Ministry of Construction in 1994, which later became part of the Ministry of Land, Infrastructure and Transport. While in the ministry, he received a master's degree from the University of Cambridge in England.

== Political career ==
Inoue left the ministry in 2003, and was first elected to the House of Representatives in the same year. He is still a member of that body as of January 2025.

From September 2020 to October 2021, Inoue served as Minister of State in the Suga Cabinet led by Yoshihide Suga.

From August 2022 to November 2024, he was Acting Secretary-General of the Liberal Democratic Party.

Inoue is affiliated to the openly revisionist lobby Nippon Kaigi.

== Election history ==
Election	Age	District	Political party	Number of votes	election results
2003 Japanese general election	34	Tokyo 25th district	LDP	80,443	winning
2005 Japanese general election	35	Tokyo 25th district	LDP	113,800	winning
2009 Japanese general election	39	Tokyo 25th district	LDP	106,201	winning
2012 Japanese general election	43	Tokyo 25th district	LDP	100,523	winning
2014 Japanese general election	45	Tokyo 25th district	LDP	100,081	winning
2017 Japanese general election	48	Tokyo 25th district	LDP	112,014	winning
2021 Japanese general election	52	Tokyo 25th district	LDP	131,430	winning
2024 Japanese general election	55	Tokyo 25th district	LDP	110,488	winning

House of Representatives (Japan)
Preceded by Yōzō Ishikawa	Member of the House of Representatives from Tokyo 25th district (single-member); 2003–	Incumbent
Political offices
Preceded by Yukio Ubukata; Yasuhiro Sonoda	Senior Vice Minister of the Environment; 2012– Served alongside: Kazunori Tanaka	Incumbent
