= Tokyo 25th district =

Japan House of Representatives constituency

Tokyo 25th District
- Parliamentary constituency for the Japanese House of Representatives
- Numbered map of Tokyo single-member districts
- Prefecture: Tokyo
- Proportional District: Tokyo
- Electorate: 413,266 (2021)

Current constituency
- Created: 1994
- Seats: One
- Party: LDP
- Representative: Shinji Inoue
- Created from: Tokyo 11th district

Tōkyō 25th district is a constituency of the House of Representatives in the Diet of Japan. It is located in the westernmost part of Tokyo prefecture. As of 2012, 321,319 eligible voters were registered in the district giving it the highest vote weight in Tokyo – several districts in former Tokyo city in Eastern Tokyo have more than 450,000 voters – but still more than 1.5 times as many voters as the least populated electoral districts in Japan.

The district covers the mostly rural Nishitama District as well as the cities of Ōme, Fussa, Akiruno and Hamura. After redistricting in 2017 the city of Akishima was transferred to the 25th district from the Tokyo 21st district.

Before the electoral reform of 1994, the area had been part of Tokyo 11th district that elected five Representatives by single non-transferable vote.

Since its creation, Tokyo 25th district has been a relatively safe seat for the Liberal Democratic Party and withstood the landslide Democratic victory in the 2009 general election. Its first representative, former defence minister Yōzō Ishikawa (Miyazawa→Kōno faction (present-day Asō faction)) who had represented the pre-reform 11th district since 1976, was succeeded by Shinji Inoue (Asō faction), a former MLIT bureaucrat.

== List of representatives ==
Representative	Party	Dates	Notes
Yozo Ishikawa	LDP	1996–2003	Retired from politics in 2003
Shinji Inoue	LDP	2003–	Incumbent

== Election results ==
2026
Party	Candidate	Votes	%	±%
LDP	Shinji Inoue (incumbent)	109,606	50.5	▼2.6
Centrist Reform	Karen Yoda	50,219	23.1	
DPP	Hisataka Munakata	21,515	9.9	
Sanseitō	Nami Kimura	20,603	9.5	
Ishin	Tarō Miyazaki	15,185	7.0	▼12.8
Registered electors		408,868		
Turnout			54.51	▲1.65
LDP hold				

2024
Party	Candidate	Votes	%	±%
Liberal Democratic (endorsed by Komeito)	Shinji Inoue (incumbent)	110,488	53.10	▼6.26
Innovation	Tarō Miyazaki	41,080	19.74	
Reiwa	Karen Yoda	29,179	14.02	
Communist	Kōzō Ikeda	27,323	13.13	
Majority		69,408	33.36	▲14.64
Registered electors		410,366		
Turnout		208,070	52.86	▼2.04
LDP hold				

2021
Party	Candidate	Votes	%	±%
LDP	Shinji Inoue	131,430	59.4	▲7.6
CDP	Yukinari Shimada	89,991	40.6	▲19.8
Margin of victory			18.8	▼22.2
Turnout			54.90	▲2.17
LDP hold		Swing	▼6.6	

2017
Party	Candidate	Votes	%	±%
LDP	Shinji Inoue	112,014	51.8	▼9.8
CDP	Yoko Yamashita	44,884	20.8	▲0.7
Hope	Sakihito Ozawa	38,286	17.7	New
JCP	Takashi Inoue	21,031	9.7	▼8.6
Margin of victory		67,130	31	
Turnout		216,215	52.73	▲0.18
LDP hold		Swing	▼9.8	

2014
Party	Candidate	Votes	%	±%
LDP	Shinji Inoue	100,081	61.6	▲7.2
DPJ	Yoko Yamashita	32,687	20.1	New
JCP	Takashi Inoue	29,650	18.3	▲8.7
Margin of victory		67,394	41.49	
Turnout		162,418	52.55	▼7.38
LDP hold		Swing	▲7.2	

2012
Party	Candidate	Votes	%	±%
LDP (Kōmeitō, NRP)	Shinji Inoue	100,523	54.4	
DP (PNP)	Mitsuaki Takeda	28,751	15.5	
JRP	Teppei Matsumoto	27,258	14.7	
JCP	Takashi Inoue	17,720	9.6	
TPJ (NPD)	Tarō Masago	10,689	5.8	

2009
Party	Candidate	Votes	%	±%
LDP (Kōmeitō support)	Shinji Inoue	106,201	52.5	
PNP (DPJ, SDP support)	Tarō Masago	48,373	23.9	
JCP	Osamu Suzuki	21,044.259	10.4	
Independent	Yasushi Suzuki	19,874.733	9.8	
HRP	Masato Kobuna	6,673	3.3	
Turnout		208,168	65.24	

2005
Party	Candidate	Votes	%	±%
LDP	Shinji Inoue	113,800	57.0	
DPJ	Hisashi Shimada	66,008	33.0	
JCP	Takuya Suzuki	19,954	10.0	
Turnout		204,240	64.43	

2003
Party	Candidate	Votes	%	±%
LDP	Shinji Inoue	80,443	46.3	
DPJ	Hisashi Shimada (elected by PR)	71,151	40.9	
JCP	Takuya Suzuki	15,381	8.8	
Independent	Shōji Ikeda	6,858	3.9	
Turnout		180,601	57.25	

2000
Party	Candidate	Votes	%	±%
LDP	Yōzō Ishikawa	88,007	48.9	
DPJ	Hisashi Shimada	62,352	34.6	
JCP	Takuya Suzuki	25,325	14.1	
LL	Mitsuyoshi Okamura	4,299	2.4	

1996
Party	Candidate	Votes	%	±%
LDP	Yōzō Ishikawa	72,180	41.0	
NFP	Takashi Usui	62,028	35.2	
JCP	Yōji Yoshinaga	22,312	12.7	
DPJ	Yasushi Suzuki	19,611	11.1	
Turnout		180,674	60.2	
