= Mitsuo Mitani =

Japanese politician

- 三谷 光男
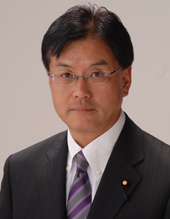
- Official portrait, 2007

Member of the House of Representatives
- In office 11 September 2005 – 16 November 2012
- Preceded by: Koji Sato
- Succeeded by: Minoru Terada
- Constituency: Chūgoku PR (2005–2009); Hiroshima 5th (2009–2012)

Personal details
- Born: 16 June 1959 (age 67) Kure, Hiroshima, Japan
- Party: Independent
- Other political affiliations: Democratic (2003–2014)
- Education: Osaka University

Mitsuo Mitani (三谷 光男, Mitani Mitsuo; born 16 June 1959) is a former Japanese politician of the Democratic Party of Japan, who served as a member of the House of Representatives in the Diet (national legislature). A native of Kure, Hiroshima and graduate of Osaka University, he was elected to the House of Representatives for the first time in September 2005 after unsuccessful runs in 2003 and April 2005.
