= Nagano 5th district =

Legislative district of Japan

Nagano 5th District
- Parliamentary constituency for the Japanese House of Representatives
- Numbered map of Nagano Prefecture single-member districts
- Prefecture: Nagano
- Proportional District: Hokurikushin'etsu
- Electorate: 278,839

Current constituency
- Created: 1994
- Seats: One
- Party: Liberal Democratic
- Representative: Ichiro Miyashita
- Municipalities: Iida, Ina, Komagane, Kamiina District and Shimoina District

Nagano 5th district (長野県第5区, Nagano-ken dai-goku or simply 長野5区, Nagano-goku) is a single-member constituency of the House of Representatives in the national Diet of Japan located in Nagano Prefecture.

== List of representatives ==
| Election | Representative | Party | Notes |
|---|---|---|---|
| 1996 | Sohei Miyashita | Liberal Democratic | |
| 2000 | Sohei Miyashita | Liberal Democratic | |
| 2003 | Ichiro Miyashita | Liberal Democratic | |
| 2005 | Ichiro Miyashita | Liberal Democratic | |
| 2009 | Gaku Kato | Democratic | |
| 2012 | Ichiro Miyashita | Liberal Democratic | |
| 2014 | Ichiro Miyashita | Liberal Democratic | |
| 2017 | Ichiro Miyashita | Liberal Democratic | |
| 2021 | Ichiro Miyashita | Liberal Democratic | |
| 2024 | Ichiro Miyashita | Liberal Democratic | |
| 2026 | Ichiro Miyashita | Liberal Democratic | |

== Election results ==
2026
| Party | Candidate | Votes | % | ±% |
|---|---|---|---|---|
| LDP | Ichiro Miyashita (Incumbent) (endorsed by Ishin) | 98,866 | 59.75 | ▲11.36 |
| Centrist Reform | Junta Fukuda | 66,593 | 40.25 | ▼2.27 |
| Registered electors | | 269,491 | | |
| Turnout | | 165,459 | 63.34 | ▲2.75 |
| LDP hold | | | | |

2024
| Party | Candidate | Votes | % | ±% |
|---|---|---|---|---|
| LDP | Ichiro Miyashita (Incumbent) {endorsed by Komeito | 78,139 | 48.39 | ▼6.47 |
| CDP | Junta Fukuda {elected via PR) | 68,650 | 42.52 | ▼2.62 |
| JCP | Sōichi Gotō | 14,681 | 9.09 | |
| Registered electors | | 272,652 | | |
| Turnout | | 161,470 | 60.59 | ▼3.96 |
| LDP hold | | | | |

2021
| Party | Candidate | Votes | % | ±% |
|---|---|---|---|---|
| Liberal Democratic | Ichiro Miyashita (Incumbent) | 97,730 | 54.86 | ▲4.99 |
| CDP | Itsuro Soga | 80,408 | 45.14 | New |
| Registered electors | | 280,074 | | |
| Turnout | | | 64.55 | ▼0.56 |
| LDP hold | | | | |

2017
| Party | Candidate | Votes | % | ±% |
|---|---|---|---|---|
| Liberal Democratic | Ichiro Miyashita (Incumbent) | 91,542 | 49.87 | ▼4.80 |
| Independent | Itsuro Soga | 48,588 | 26.47 | New |
| Kibō no Tō | Kōsuke Nakajima | 43,425 | 23.66 | New |
| Registered electors | | 287,463 | | |
| Turnout | | | 65.11 | ▲5.25 |
| LDP hold | | | | |

2014
| Party | Candidate | Votes | % | ±% |
|---|---|---|---|---|
| Liberal Democratic | Ichiro Miyashita (Incumbent) | 91,089 | 54.67 | ▲2.42 |
| Democratic | Kōsuke Nakajima | 46,595 | 27.96 | ▲14.23 |
| Communist | Chikaaki Mizuno | 28,947 | 17.37 | ▲7.51 |
| Registered electors | | 285,418 | | |
| Turnout | | | 59.86 | ▼8.16 |
| LDP hold | | | | |

2012
| Party | Candidate | Votes | % | ±% |
|---|---|---|---|---|
| Liberal Democratic | Ichiro Miyashita | 99,225 | 52.25 | ▲12.10 |
| Tomorrow | Gaku Kato (Incumbent) | 30,737 | 16.19 | New |
| Democratic | Akihisa Hanaoka | 26,079 | 13.73 | ▼33.18 |
| Communist | Yoshio Misawa | 18,723 | 9.86 | ▲3.37 |
| Social Democratic | Sachiyo Ikeda | 15,135 | 7.97 | ▲2.03 |
| Registered electors | | 288,040 | | |
| Turnout | | | 68.02 | ▼11.38 |
| LDP gain from Tomorrow | | | | |

2009
| Party | Candidate | Votes | % | ±% |
|---|---|---|---|---|
| Democratic | Gaku Kato | 107,300 | 46.91 | ▲13.79 |
| Liberal Democratic | Ichiro Miyashita (Incumbent) | 91,836 | 40.15 | ▼14.68 |
| Communist | Yoshio Misawa | 14,841 | 6.49 | ▼5.55 |
| Social Democratic | Sachiyo Ikeda | 13,576 | 5.94 | New |
| Happiness Realization | Kozo Harayama | 1,176 | 0.51 | New |
| Registered electors | | 291,541 | | |
| Turnout | | | 79.40 | ▲3.54 |
| Democratic gain from LDP | | | | |

2005
| Party | Candidate | Votes | % | ±% |
|---|---|---|---|---|
| Liberal Democratic | Ichiro Miyashita (Incumbent) | 120,025 | 54.83 | ▲2.17 |
| Democratic | Gaku Kato | 72,505 | 33.12 | ▼1.08 |
| Communist | Yoshio Misawa | 26,363 | 12.04 | ▲2.01 |
| Registered electors | | 294,037 | | |
| Turnout | | | 75.86 | ▲4.31 |
| LDP hold | | | | |

2003
| Party | Candidate | Votes | % | ±% |
|---|---|---|---|---|
| Liberal Democratic | Ichiro Miyashita | 108,567 | 52.66 | ▼4.31 |
| Democratic | Takashi Kato | 70,507 | 34.20 | ▲7.81 |
| Communist | Yoshio Misawa | 20,679 | 10.03 | ▼6.61 |
| Independent | Hiroyuki Seki | 6,408 | 3.11 | New |
| Registered electors | | 294,005 | | |
| Turnout | | | 71.55 | ▼2.43 |
| LDP hold | | | | |

2000
| Party | Candidate | Votes | % | ±% |
|---|---|---|---|---|
| Liberal Democratic | Sohei Miyashita (Incumbent) | 120,337 | 56.97 | ▲9.12 |
| Democratic | Takashi Kato | 55,736 | 26.39 | New |
| Communist | Isamu Ōtsubo | 35,141 | 16.64 | ▲6.97 |
| Turnout | | | 73.98 | |
| LDP hold | | | | |

1996
| Party | Candidate | Votes | % | ±% |
|---|---|---|---|---|
| Liberal Democratic | Sohei Miyashita | 106,449 | 47.85 | New |
| New Frontier | Mamoru Nakajima | 94,496 | 42.48 | New |
| Communist | Norihisa Yamaguchi | 21,502 | 9.67 | New |
| Turnout | | | | |
