= Minoru Terada =

Japanese politician (born 1958)

- 寺田 稔
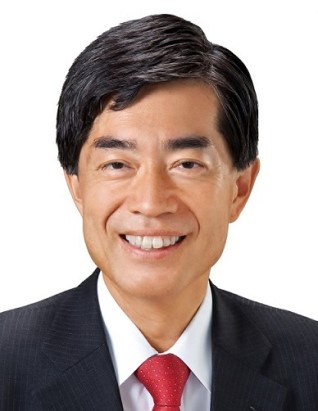
- Official portrait, 2021

Minister for Internal Affairs and Communications
- In office 10 August 2022 – 20 November 2022
- Prime Minister: Fumio Kishida
- Preceded by: Yasushi Kaneko
- Succeeded by: Takeaki Matsumoto

Member of the House of Representatives
- Incumbent
- Assumed office 16 December 2012
- Preceded by: Mitsuo Mitani
- Constituency: Hiroshima 5th (2012–2024); Chūgoku PR (2024–present)
- In office 27 April 2004 – 21 July 2009
- Preceded by: Yukihiko Ikeda
- Succeeded by: Mitsuo Mitani
- Constituency: Hiroshima 5th

Personal details
- Born: 24 January 1958 (age 68) Hiroshima, Japan
- Party: Liberal Democratic
- Education: University of Tokyo; Harvard University

Minoru Terada (寺田 稔, Terada Minoru; born 24 January 1958) is a Japanese politician who served as the Minister for Internal Affairs and Communications from August until November 2022. A member of the Liberal Democratic Party, he also serves in the House of Representatives and was Special Advisor to Prime Minister Fumio Kishida from December 2021 to August 2022.

== Early life ==
Terada is a native of Hiroshima, Hiroshima and graduated from the University of Tokyo (Alma mater, Faculty of Law). He joined the Ministry of Finance in 1980, attending Harvard University in United States in 1982, while in the ministry.

== Political career ==
Terada was elected to the House of Representatives for the first time in 2004, having left the ministry after the death of his uncle and former Foreign Minister Yukihiko Ikeda.

Terada also served as Secretary at the Embassy of Japan in Washington, D.C., Senior Vice Minister of Cabinet Office, and Senior Vice Minister for Reconstruction

On November 20, 2022, Terada was sacked from his position as the Minister for Internal Affairs and Communications after a magazine alleging him of misusing political funds, prompting calls for his resignation from opposition parties who saw him as unfit to supervise election-related laws.

== Policies ==
Affiliated to the openly revisionist lobby Nippon Kaigi, which advocates a return to militarism in Japan, Terada is in favor of allowing collective self-defense.

== Family ==
Terada's wife Keiko is a granddaughter of Hayato Ikeda, former Prime Minister of Japan.

Political offices
Preceded by Yasushi Kaneko	Minister for Internal Affairs and Communications; 2022	Succeeded by Takeaki Matsumoto
