= Yūko Obuchi =

Japanese politician (born 1973)

- 小渕 優子
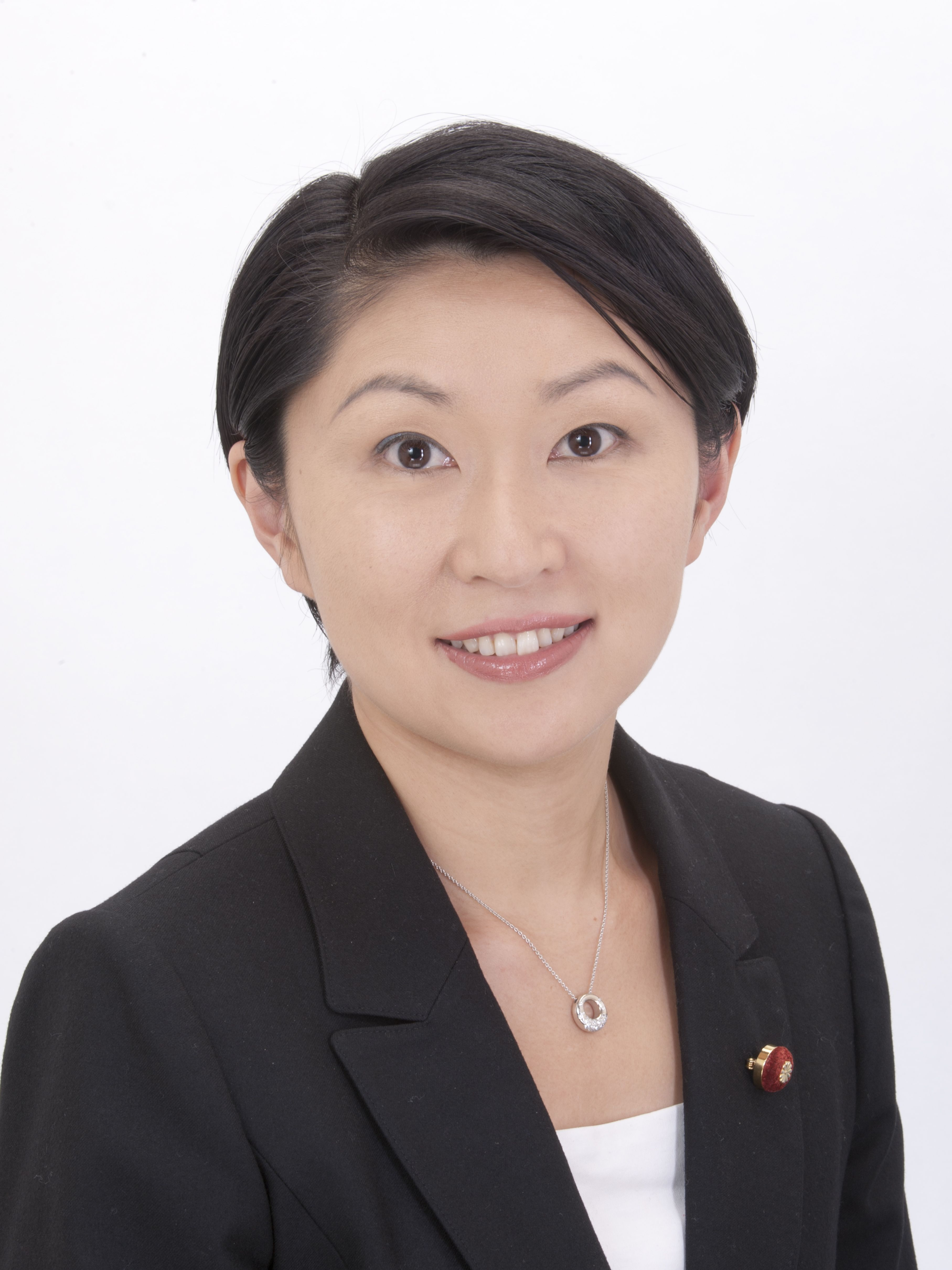
- Official portrait, 2012

Minister of Economy, Trade and Industry
- In office 3 September 2014 – 21 October 2014
- Prime Minister: Shinzo Abe
- Preceded by: Toshimitsu Motegi
- Succeeded by: Yoichi Miyazawa

Member of the House of Representatives
- Incumbent
- Assumed office 26 June 2000
- Preceded by: Keizō Obuchi
- Constituency: Gunma 5th

Personal details
- Born: 11 December 1973 (age 52) Bunkyō, Tokyo, Japan
- Party: Liberal Democratic
- Spouse: Kazuaki Setoguchi (m. 2004)
- Children: 2
- Parent(s): Keizō Obuchi (father); Chizuko Ono (mother)
- Education: Seijo University

Yuko Obuchi (小渕 優子, Obuchi Yūko; born 11 December 1973) is a Japanese politician. She is a member of the House of Representatives for the Liberal Democratic Party. She briefly served as Minister of Economy, Trade and Industry during the Abe government, but was forced to resign. She is the second daughter of Keizo Obuchi, who served as Prime Minister of Japan from 1998 to 2000.

== Early life ==
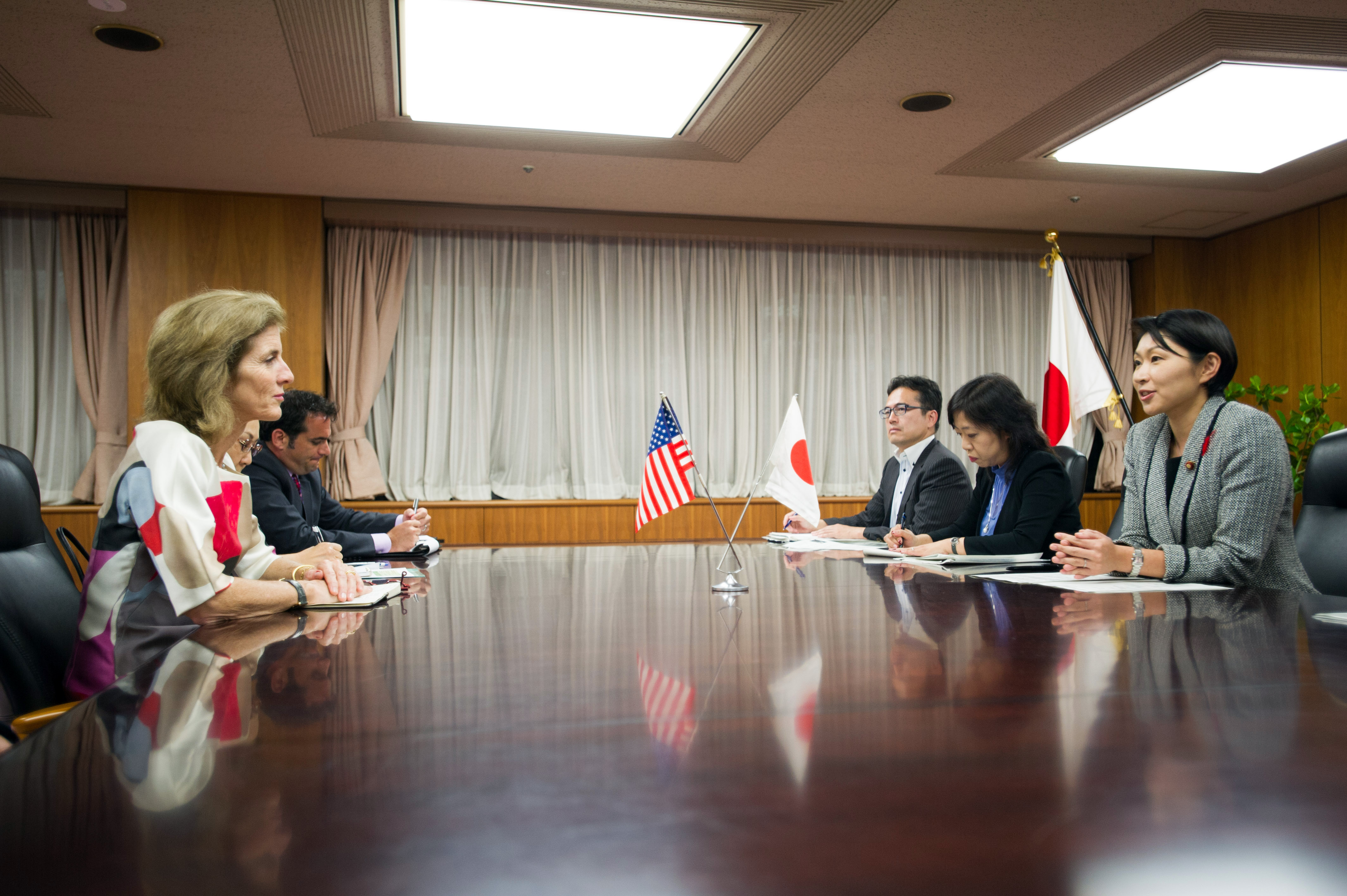
Obuchi (far right) meeting with United States Ambassador to Japan Caroline Kennedy (far left) in 2014.

Obuchi was born in Tokyo in 1973. She graduated from Seijo University and joined the broadcaster TBS in 1996.

== Political career ==
Obuchi began working as an aide to her father in 1999. She was elected to the House of Representatives for the first time in the 2000 general election, winning her late father's Diet seat after his death in office.

=== Aso government ===
On September 24, 2008, Obuchi was appointed Minister of State for Social Affairs and Gender Equality in the cabinet of Prime Minister Tarō Asō. This made her Japan's youngest cabinet member in the post-war era.

=== Abe government ===
In December 2012, she was appointed Vice Minister of Finance by the new Prime Minister Shinzō Abe, and on 3 September 2014, she was made Minister of Economy, Trade and Industry in Abe's cabinet. As such, she became the minister responsible for the nuclear industry in Japan, with partial responsibility for the Fukushima Daiichi nuclear disaster clean-up. She was viewed at the time as a potential candidate for prime minister.

Obuchi resigned from her position as the Minister of Economy, Trade and Industry on October 19, 2014, amid allegations of misuse of political contributions. Her departure was seen as a blow to the Abe government. An investigation committee found in October 2015 that Obuchi had no legal responsibility for the scandal, as the false entries had been made by two of her aides without her knowledge.

== Personal life ==
Obuchi is married and has two sons. Her husband, Kazuaki Setoguchi, joined TBS at the same time as Obuchi in 1996. They married in December 2004 after dating for several years.

House of Representatives (Japan)
Preceded by Keizō Obuchi	Representative for Gunma's 5th district 2000 –	Incumbent
Political offices
Preceded by Toshimitsu Motegi	Minister of Economy, Trade and Industry; 2014	Succeeded by Yoichi Miyazawa
Party political offices
Liberal Democratic Party
Preceded by Itsunori Onodera	Chief of the Organisation and Movement Headquarters; 2021–2023	Succeeded by Yasushi Kaneko
Preceded by Hiroshi Moriyama	Chairman of the Election Strategy Committee; 2023–2024	Succeeded by Shinjirō Koizumi
Preceded by Yasushi Kaneko	Chief of the Organisation and Movement Headquarters; 2024–2025	Succeeded by Yoshitaka Shindo
