= Gunma 5th district =

Legislative district of Japan

Parliamentary constituencies in Gunma prefecture

Gunma 5th district is a constituency of the House of Representatives in the Diet of Japan (national legislature). It is located in Gunma Prefecture and consists of the cities of Tomioka, Annaka, parts of Takasaki and Shibukawa as well as the Kitagunma, Kanra and Agatsuma districts. As of 2012, 315,747 eligible voters were registered in the district.

Gunma, home to the families of former prime ministers Takeo Fukuda (and his son Yasuo Fukuda), Nakasone and Obuchi, is considered a "conservative kingdom" (hoshu-ōkoku), a stronghold of the Liberal Democratic Party (LDP). The 5th district has been represented by Keizō Obuchi and his daughter Yūko Obuchi since its creation in 1996. Previously Keizō Obuchi and his father Mitsuhei (first elected in 1949) had represented the four-member 3rd district of Gunma.

== List of representatives ==
Representative	Party	Dates	Notes
Keizō Obuchi	LDP	1996 – 2000	
Yūko Obuchi	LDP	2000 –	Incumbent

== Election results ==
2026
Party	Candidate	Votes	%	±%
LDP (Ishin)	Yūko Obuchi	107,356	68.6	▲6.73
Sanseitō	Tomoki Kogure	49,187	31.4	New
Registered electors		305,988		
Turnout			55.41	▲2.59
LDP hold				

2024
Party	Candidate	Votes	%	±%
LDP (Komeito)	Yūko Obuchi	96,580	61.85	▼14.74
Ishin	Yumiko Nakajima	36,928	23.65	
JCP	Tatsuya Ito	22,655	14.51	▼8.9
Registered electors		310,143		
Turnout			52.82	▼3.60
LDP hold				

2021
Party	Candidate	Votes	%	±%
LDP (Komeito)	Yūko Obuchi	125,702	76.59	▲11.64
JCP	Tatsuya Ito	38,428	23.41	▲14.55
Registered electors		303,298		
Turnout			56.42	▲0.65
LDP hold				

2017
Party	Candidate	Votes	%	±%
LDP (Komeito)	Yūko Obuchi	109,453	64.95	▼6.07
Kibō no Tō	Sachiko Inoguchi	30,127	17.88	
JCP	Tatsuya Ito	14,935	8.86	▼5.49
Social Democratic	Nobuyuki Takahashi	14,008	8.31	▼6.33

2014
Party	Candidate	Votes	%	±%
LDP (Komeito)	Yūko Obuchi	114,458	71.02	▼6.28
Social Democratic	Xiaolin Renzhi	23,590	14.64	▲1.64
JCP	Hiroshi Itoi	23,121	14.35	▲4.55

2012
Party	Candidate	Votes	%	±%
LDP (Komeito)	Yūko Obuchi	134,685	77.3	
Social Democratic	Hitoshi Kobayashi	22,603	13.0	
JCP	Hiroshi Itoi	17,036	9.8	

2009
Party	Candidate	Votes	%	±%
LDP	Yūko Obuchi	152,708		
Social Democratic	Tomihisa Tsuchiya	53,048		
Happiness Realization	Hideyuki Ubukata	9,406		

2005
Party	Candidate	Votes	%	±%
LDP	Yūko Obuchi	144,782		
Democratic	Kunihiko Tajima	52,394		
JCP	Aiko Fukuda	16,234		
Turnout		219,918	68.94	

2003
Party	Candidate	Votes	%	±%
LDP	Yūko Obuchi	144,848		
Social Democratic	Masao Asagai	27,693		
JCP	Kimiko Yanagita	15,674		

2000
Party	Candidate	Votes	%	±%
LDP	Yūko Obuchi	163,991		
Social Democratic	Tsuruo Yamaguchi	35,769		
JCP	Tadashi Handa	11,674		
Liberal League	Hiroyuki Andō	3,259		

1996
Party	Candidate	Votes	%	±%
LDP	Keizō Obuchi	127,052		
Democratic	Miyuki Shibayama	33,218		
JCP	Teruhiko Sumitani	19,438		
