= Hiroshima 5th district =

Japan House of Representatives constituency

- Parliamentary constituency for the Japanese House of Representatives
- Numbered map of the Hiroshima Prefecture single seats
- Prefecture: Hiroshima
- Proportional District: Chūgoku
- Electorate: 299,056

Current constituency
- Created: 1994
- Seats: One
- Party: LDP
- Representative: Shin Yamamoto
- Municipalities: Fuchū, Mihara, Miyoshi, Onomichi, Shōbara, Jinseki District and Sera District.

Hiroshima 5th district (広島県第5区, Hiroshima-ken dai-goku or simply 広島5区, Hiroshima-goku) is a single-member constituency of the House of Representatives in the national Diet of Japan located in Hiroshima Prefecture.

== Areas covered ==
=== Since 2022 ===
- Fuchū
- Mihara
- Miyoshi
- Onomichi
- Shōbara
- Jinseki District
- Sera District

=== 2013 - 2022 ===
- Part of Etajima
- Part of Higashihiroshima
- Kure
- Part of Mihara
- Part of Onomichi
- Takehara
- Toyota District

=== 1994 - 2013 ===
- Kure
- Takehara
- Part of Aki District
- Toyota District

== List of representatives ==
Election	Representative	Party	Notes
1996	Yukihiko Ikeda	LDP	
2000	Yukihiko Ikeda	LDP	
2003	Yukihiko Ikeda	LDP	
2004 by-el	Minoru Terada	LDP	
2005	Minoru Terada	LDP	
2009	Mitsuo Mitani	Democratic	
2012	Minoru Terada	LDP	
2014	Minoru Terada	LDP	
2017	Minoru Terada	LDP	
2021	Minoru Terada	LDP	
2024	Koji Sato	CDP	
2024	Koji Sato	CRA	
2026	Shin Yamamoto	LDP	

== Election results ==
=== 2026 ===
2026
Party	Candidate	Votes	%	±%
LDP	Shin Yamamoto	78,649	50.71	
Centrist Reform	Koji Sato	67,715	43.66	
JCP	Mayumi Inohara	8,726	5.63	
Majority		10,934	7.05	
Registered electors		291,694		
Turnout			54.36	▲1.29
LDP gain from Centrist Reform				

=== 2024 ===
2024
Party	Candidate	Votes	%	±%
CDP	Koji Sato	82,297	53.37	
LDP	Toshifumi Kojima	60,796	39.43	
JCP	Mayumi Inohara	11,106	7.20	N/A
Majority		21,501	13.94	
Registered electors		298,078		
Turnout			53.07	▼1.45
CDP gain from LDP				

=== 2021 ===
2021
Party	Candidate	Votes	%	±%
LDP	Minoru Terada	87,434	67.66	
CDP	Kojiro Nomura	41,788	32.34	New
Majority		45,646	35.32	
Registered electors		242,034		
Turnout			54.52	▲2.88
LDP hold				

=== 2017 ===
2017
Party	Candidate	Votes	%	±%
LDP	Minoru Terada	86,193	67.10	
Kibō no Tō	Kotoe Hashimoto	27,912	21.73	New
JCP	Hikaru Ozaki	14,356	11.18	
Majority		58,281	45.37	
Registered electors		256,815		
Turnout			51.64	▲1.12
LDP hold				

=== 2014 ===
2014
Party	Candidate	Votes	%	±%
LDP	Minoru Terada	95,526	77.71	
JCP	Hikaru Ozaki	27,406	22.29	
Majority		68,120	55.42	
Registered electors		259,578		
Turnout			50.52	▼11.18
LDP hold				

=== 2012 ===
2012
Party	Candidate	Votes	%	±%
LDP	Minoru Terada	99,842	63.06	
Democratic	Mitsuo Mitani	49,356	31.17	
JCP	Hikaru Ozaki	9,126	5.76	N/A
Majority		50,486	31.89	
Registered electors		265,314		
Turnout			61.70	▼11.40
LDP gain from Democratic				

=== 2009 ===
2009
Party	Candidate	Votes	%	±%
Democratic	Mitsuo Mitani	99,770	50.88	
LDP	Minoru Terada	93,594	47.73	
Happiness Realization	Yoshiteru Tsukamoto	2,738	1.40	New
Majority		6,176	3.15	
Registered electors		273,182		
Turnout			73.10	
Democratic gain from LDP				

=== 2005 ===
2005
Party	Candidate	Votes	%	±%
LDP	Minoru Terada	97,383	49.62	
Democratic	Mitsuo Mitani (Won PR seat)	91,121	46.43	
JCP	Susumu Kakutani	7,765	3.96	
Majority		6,262	3.19	
Registered electors				
Turnout				
LDP hold				

=== 2004 by-election ===
2004 Hiroshima 5th district by-election
Party	Candidate	Votes	%	±%
LDP	Minoru Terada	78,769	50.51	
Democratic	Mitsuo Mitani	71,287	45.71	
JCP	Susumu Matsumoto	5,888	3.78	
Majority		7,482	4.80	
Registered electors				
Turnout				
LDP hold				

=== 2003 ===
2003
Party	Candidate	Votes	%	±%
LDP	Yukihiko Ikeda	76,264	42.10	
Democratic	Shuichi Sasaki	48,300	26.66	
Independent	Mitsuo Mitani	36,170	19.97	New
Independent	Toshiaki Yamamoto	13,531	7.47	New
JCP	Susumu Matsumoto	6,896	3.81	
Majority		27,964	15.44	
Registered electors				
Turnout				
LDP hold				

=== 2000 ===
2000
Party	Candidate	Votes	%	±%
LDP	Yukihiko Ikeda	107,954	58.72	
Democratic	Shuichi Sasaki	59,332	32.27	New
JCP	Susumu Kakutani	12,806	6.97	
Independent	Satoru Mori	3,769	2.05	New
Majority		48,622	26.45	
Registered electors				
Turnout				
LDP hold				

=== 1996 ===
1996
Party	Candidate	Votes	%	±%
LDP	Yukihiko Ikeda	105,602	59.74	New
Democratic	Churyo Morii	45,849	25.94	New
New Socialist	Yukimitsu Hachiyama	14,851	8.40	New
JCP	Kazuyuki Horikoshi	10,468	5.92	New
Majority		59,753	33.80	
Registered electors				
Turnout				
LDP win (new seat)				
