= Ichiro Miyashita =

Japanese politician

- 宮下 一郎
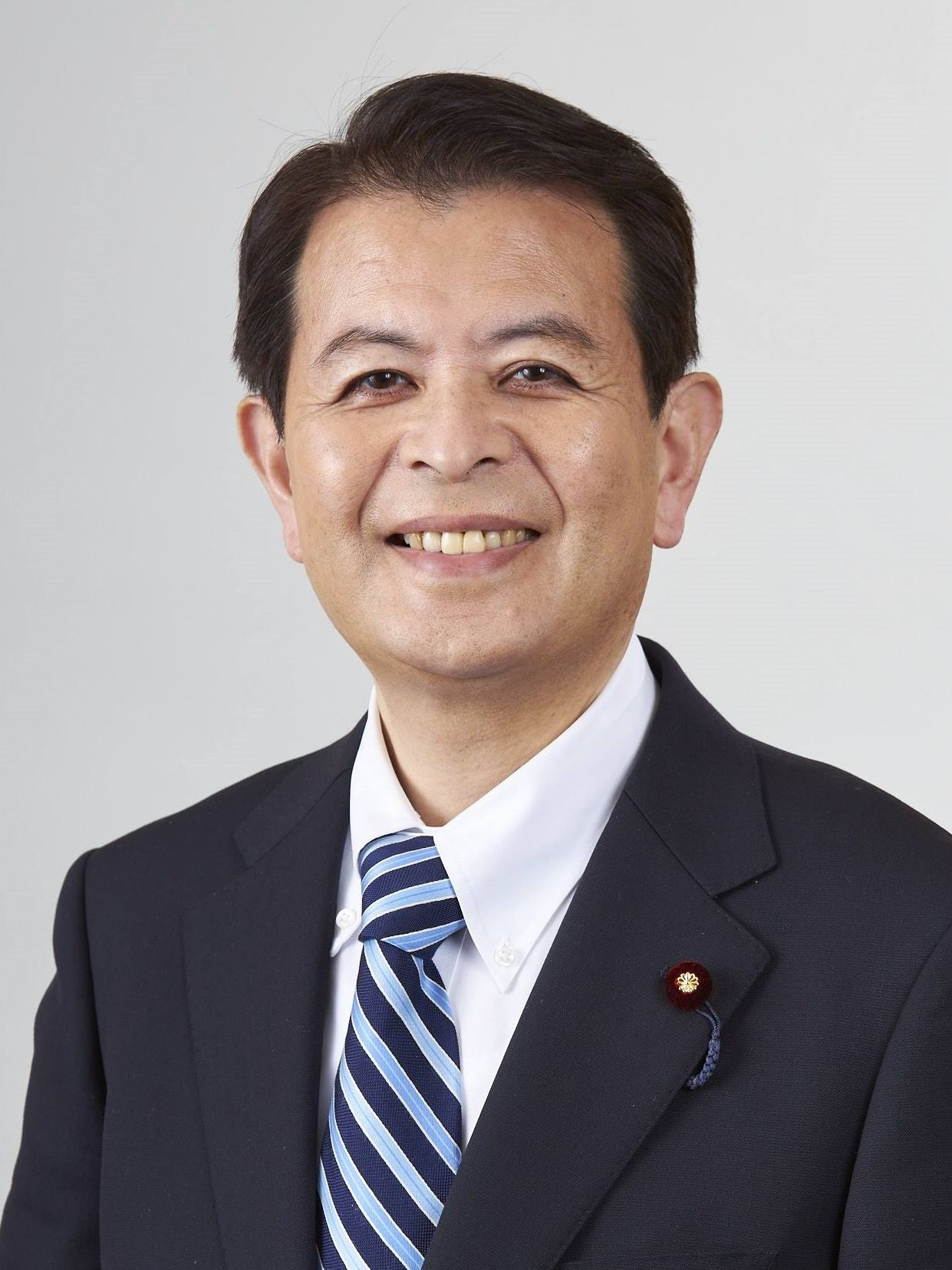
- Official portrait, 2020

Minister of Agriculture, Forestry and Fisheries
- In office 13 September 2023 – 14 December 2023
- Prime Minister: Fumio Kishida
- Preceded by: Tetsuro Nomura
- Succeeded by: Tetsushi Sakamoto

Member of the House of Representatives
- Incumbent
- Assumed office 18 December 2012
- Preceded by: Gaku Kato
- Constituency: Nagano 5th
- In office 9 November 2003 – 21 July 2009
- Preceded by: Sohei Miyashita
- Succeeded by: Gaku Kato
- Constituency: Nagano 5th

Personal details
- Born: 1 August 1958 (age 68) Nagoya, Japan
- Party: Liberal Democratic
- Parent: Sohei Miyashita (father)
- Education: University of Tokyo

Ichiro Miyashita (宮下 一郎, Miyashita Ichirō; born 1 August 1958) is a Japanese politician of the Liberal Democratic Party (LDP), a member of the House of Representatives in the Diet (national legislature). A native of Nagoya, Aichi and graduate of the University of Tokyo, he worked at The Sumitomo Bank from 1983 to 1991. He was elected to the House of Representatives for the first time in 2003. His father is former Health minister Sohei Miyashita.

Miyashita was appointed minister of agriculture in the Kishida cabinet in September 2023, but resigned in December due to his faction's involvement in a slush fund scandal.

In November 2024, he was appointed chairman of the LDP agriculture and forestry policy research council (総合農林政策調査会). In April 2026, he also became executive vice chairman of the Election Strategy Committee under Yasutoshi Nishimura.
