= Fiscal populism =

Political ideology

Fiscal populism is a political ideology that promotes increased government spending and tax cuts while downplaying fiscal conservatism, long-term budgetary sustainability, or austerity-oriented fiscal consolidation strategies.

This approach is often employed to achieve short-term political objectives such as gaining electoral support or maintaining political power. Policies driven by fiscal populism tend to prioritize short-term economic growth and the provision of voter-friendly benefits, which can result in growing fiscal deficits, rising public debt, and structural fiscal imbalances. In contrast, austerity seeks to restore fiscal soundness through spending cuts and tax increases, whereas fiscal populism, by prioritizing popularity, carries the risk of undermining long-term fiscal stability.

== Fiscal populism by country ==
=== Spain ===
In Spain, Isabel Díaz Ayuso, the President of the Community of Madrid and a rising figure in the conservative People’s Party (PP), has strongly criticized the governing Spanish Socialist Workers' Party (PSOE) under Prime Minister Pedro Sánchez, accusing it of following a populist fiscal model similar to Peronism in Argentina. The controversy arose in the Madrid regional parliament during debates over the Sánchez administration’s proposal to introduce a new wealth tax aimed at funding subsidies for energy costs and housing, with the goal of fiscal redistribution. Ayuso labeled the proposed tax as an instance of fiscal populism, asserting that it represents a shift towards a "Peronist-style government" in Spain. She argued that the government’s approach involves "extracting money from citizens and redistributing it through direct grants, subsidies, and aid programs," and warned against the establishment of what she called "decadent economic policies" that have led to economic instability in various countries. According to Ayuso, these measures risk undermining the financial sustainability of Spain's small and medium-sized enterprises (SMEs), whose profit margins are already squeezed by rising costs. Emphasizing a contrast between populist redistribution and economic freedom, she stated that "the people of Spain want the freedom to pursue their own goals, make decisions with their own savings, and build their future without state overreach." Ayuso warned that fiscal populism, as seen in other nations, could lead to increased bankruptcies and threaten employment stability in Spain.

=== Japan ===
The Democratic Party of Japan, which came to power in 2009, won power by writing a manifesto that included many policies aimed at the people, but failed to realize these policies because it could not support its finances.

At the 2024 Japanese general election, two fiscal populist parties made strides: Democratic Party For the People, which insists on cutting consumption taxes to 5% without providing financial resources, and Reiwa Shinsengumi, which advocates abolishing consumption taxes.

As of the 2020s, many politicians from the establishment Liberal Democratic Party and Constitutional Democratic Party of Japan are critical of fiscal populism. In 2025, former CDPJ leader Yukio Edano expressed opposition to fiscal populism, saying a consumption tax cut would be a "fiscal puncture".

== See also ==
- Anti-austerity movement
