= Honebuto no hōshin =

Japanese economic policy guidelines

Basic Policies for Economic and Fiscal Management and Reform (経済財政運営と構造改革に関する基本方針, keizai zaisei un'ei to kōzō kaikaku ni kansuru kihon hōshin), commonly referred to by a term which literally translates to "Big-Boned Policy" (骨太の方針, honebuto no hōshin), is a set of policy guidelines used by the Japanese government to draft policy on economic and fiscal management. First proposed by the Liberal Democratic Party in 2001, it is formulated annually by the Council on Economic and Fiscal Policy. The initiative was abandoned by the Democratic Party of Japan in 2010, but revived in 2013 under the Shinzō Abe's administration.

== Background ==
Before 2001, the Ministry of Finance exercised a strong influence over the compilation of the budget. The 86th Japanese Prime Minister, Yoshirō Mori, established the Council on Economic and Fiscal Policy (CEFP), modelled on the American Council of Economic Advisers, in January 2001 to strengthen the prime minister’s power over economic and fiscal policy. The council has up to 11 members, including the Minister of State for Economic and Fiscal Policy and the Governor of the Bank of Japan. It is chaired by the Prime Minister, with four or more independent financial experts. Outside experts are expected to give the council opinions that are not affiliated with the government. It also gives ministers and specialists an opportunity to be more influential in shaping economic policy.

== History ==
At the end of February 2001, the CEFP proposed the creation of a budget outline (予算大綱, yosan taikō) as a step towards reforming the budget. This garnered opposition from the Ministry of Finance, concerned that the plan would be too detailed and ineffective. After Mori's resignation, his successor Junichiro Koizumi adopted the outline and proposed the first Honebuto-no hōshin (literally "big-boned policy") statement in June 2001.

The Honebuto-no hōshin was designed to change the basic structure of politics, expressly in relation to the budget. Koizumi aimed at giving credibility to the contents of the budget. In Japan, the Ministry of Finance decides on a budget bill, traditionally reflecting the stance of the party in government. Koizumi considered this method inadequate to combat Japan's chronic deflation and wanted accountability to rest not primarily with government officials but rather with the members of the National Diet, the representatives of the Japanese people. Therefore, this policy agenda was put forward in 2001 by the Koizumi government.

Honebuto-no hōshin is a policy term used by the Liberal Democratic Party, and was not used to describe the policies of the Democratic Party of Japan, which was in power from 2010 to 2012. It has been amended since then and, after a brief hiatus, Shinzō Abe's government announced a new ‘Honebuto-no hōshin’ in 2013. Major laws proposed by the Liberal Democratic Party have been discussed as part of the policy, for example, postal service privatization in 2001 and the trinity reform in 2003. The policy has had a strong influence on Abenomics.
