= Keizō Obuchi =

Prime Minister of Japan from 1998 to 2000

- 小渕 恵三
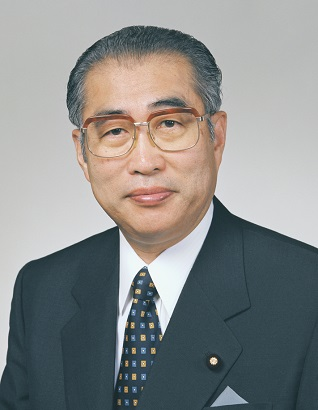
- Official portrait, 1998

Prime Minister of Japan
- In office 30 July 1998 – 3 April 2000
- Monarch: Akihito
- Preceded by: Ryutaro Hashimoto
- Succeeded by: Mikio Aoki (acting); Yoshirō Mori

President of the Liberal Democratic Party
- In office 24 July 1998 – 5 April 2000
- Secretary-General: Yoshirō Mori
- Preceded by: Ryutaro Hashimoto
- Succeeded by: Yoshirō Mori
Ministerial offices
Minister for Foreign Affairs
In office 11 September 1997 – 30 July 1998
Prime Minister	Ryutaro Hashimoto
Preceded by	Yukihiko Ikeda
Succeeded by	Masahiko Kōmura
Chief Cabinet Secretary
In office 6 November 1987 – 3 June 1989
Prime Minister	Noboru Takeshita
Preceded by	Masaharu Gotoda
Succeeded by	Masajuro Shiokawa
Director-General of the Prime Minister's Office
In office 9 November 1979 – 17 July 1980
Prime Minister	Masayoshi Ōhira
Preceded by	Asao Mihara
Succeeded by	Taro Nakayama
Director-General of the Okinawa Development Agency
In office 9 November 1979 – 17 July 1980
Prime Minister	Masayoshi Ōhira
Preceded by	Asao Mihara
Succeeded by	Taro Nakayama
Party political offices
Vice President of the Liberal Democratic Party
In office July 1994 – October 1995
President	Yōhei Kōno
Secretary-General	Yoshirō Mori; Hiroshi Mitsuzuka
Preceded by	Shin Kanemaru (1992)
Succeeded by	Taku Yamasaki (2003)
Secretary-General of the Liberal Democratic Party
In office April 1991 – October 1991
President	Toshiki Kaifu
Preceded by	Ichirō Ozawa
Succeeded by	Tamisuke Watanuki

Member of the House of Representatives
- In office 21 November 1963 – 14 May 2000
- Preceded by: Tsuruo Yamaguchi
- Succeeded by: Yūko Obuchi
- Constituency: Gunma 3rd (1963–1996); Gunma 5th (1996–2000)

Personal details
- Born: 25 June 1937 Nakanojō, Gunma, Japan
- Died: 14 May 2000 (aged 62) Bunkyō, Tokyo, Japan
- Party: Liberal Democratic (Heisei Kenkyūkai)
- Spouse: Chizuko Ono (m. 1967)
- Children: 3, including Yūko
- Education: Waseda University (BA)

Keizō Obuchi (Japanese: 小渕 恵三, Hepburn: Obuchi Keizō; 25 June 1937 – 14 May 2000) was a Japanese politician who served as Prime Minister of Japan and President of the Liberal Democratic Party (LDP) from 1998 to 2000.

Born in Gunma Prefecture, Obuchi graduated from Waseda University and was first elected to the National Diet in 1963, becoming one of the youngest legislators in Japanese history. He rose through the ranks of the LDP, serving as director of the Okinawa Development Agency from 1979 to 1980, chief cabinet secretary under Noboru Takeshita from 1987 to 1989, and foreign minister under Ryutaro Hashimoto from 1997 to 1998, where he distinguished himself during talks with Russia on the Kuril Islands dispute.

Obuchi became prime minister in 1998, and during his tenure attempted to conclude a peace treaty with Russia to formally end World War II and to revive Japan's stagnant economy by raising public spending and lowering income taxes. In 2000, Obuchi suddenly fell into a coma and died six weeks later.

== Early life ==
Obuchi was born on 25 June 1937 in Nakanojō, Gunma Prefecture, the son of Mitsuhei Obuchi, one of four representatives in the National Diet for a district in Gunma. At the age of 13, Obuchi transferred to a private middle school in Tokyo and lived in the city for the rest of his life. In 1958, Obuchi enrolled at Waseda University as an English literature major, in hopes of becoming a writer. When his father died that same year, Obuchi decided to follow in his footsteps as a politician, and continued as a graduate student in political science after graduating with his Bachelor of Arts degree in English in 1962.

Between January and September 1963, Obuchi travelled to thirty-eight countries, completely circumnavigating the globe and taking odd jobs as he went, as he was short on money. These included being a dishwasher, an assistant aikido instructor and a TV camera crew assistant in Berlin which was the most physically demanding. While in the United States, Obuchi met Attorney-General Robert F. Kennedy, who had given a speech the previous year at Waseda University where Obuchi was a student. 36 years later, while on a trip to visit President Bill Clinton as the Prime Minister of Japan, he would again meet Kennedy's secretary who had helped to arrange the earlier visit.

== Political career ==
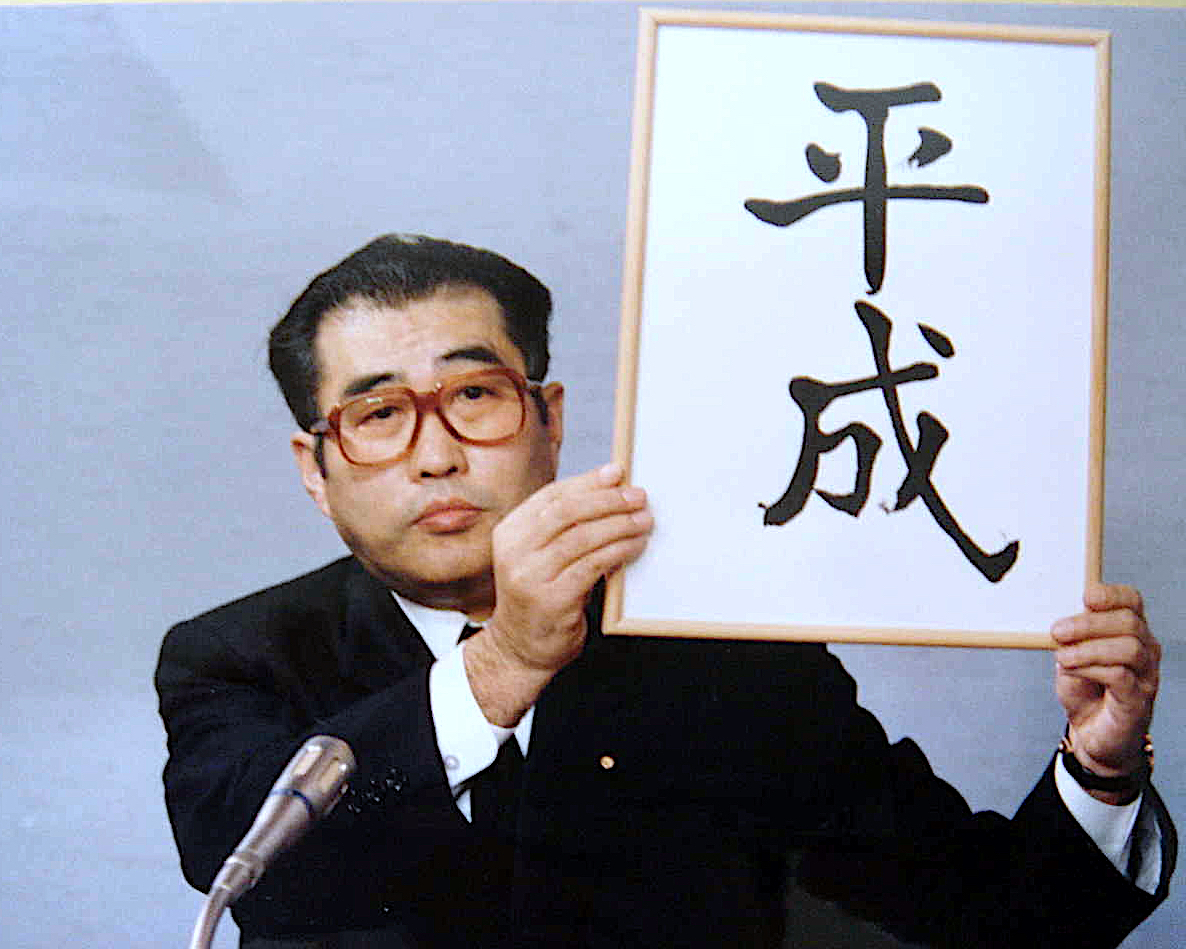
Obuchi announcing the new Heisei era, 7 January 1989

That November, after being inspired by his meeting with Kennedy, Obuchi ran for the House of Representatives and was elected to a seat representing Gunma's 3rd district, making him the youngest legislator in Japanese history at 26 years of age. He served his first term in the Diet while pursuing graduate studies at Waseda University.

In 1979, Obuchi became the director of the Prime Minister's office and director of the Okinawa Development Agency, his first cabinet post. He served there for eight years before becoming Chief Cabinet Secretary in 1987. As Chief Cabinet Secretary, he announced the new era name "Heisei" on the day Emperor Akihito ascended the throne in 1989.

In 1991, Obuchi became secretary general of the Liberal Democratic Party (LDP), and in 1994 became its vice president. In 1997, Ryutaro Hashimoto appointed Obuchi as Minister of Foreign Affairs, where he distinguished himself in negotiations with Russia over Japanese claims in the Kuril Islands, as well as negotiations over the unification of Korea.

== Premiership (1998–2000) ==
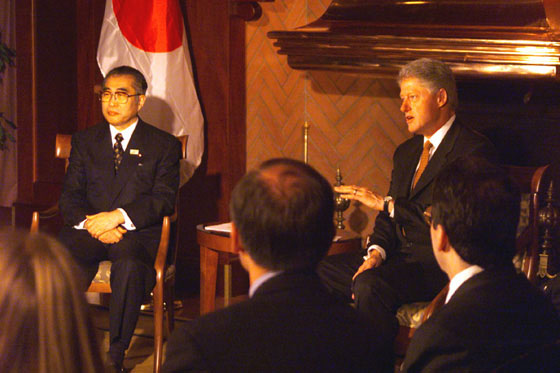
Obuchi with U.S. President Bill Clinton in Cologne in 1999

In 1998, Hashimoto resigned as LDP president when the party lost its majority in the House of Councillors, the upper house of the Diet, and Obuchi was named his successor. When the Diet designated a new prime minister, Obuchi became only the second LDP candidate not to win the support of the House of Councillors. However, the Constitution of Japan stipulates that if the two chambers cannot agree on a choice for prime minister, the choice of the House of Representatives is deemed to be that of the Diet. With the LDP's large majority in the lower house, Obuchi was formally appointed Prime Minister on 30 July.

During his term as prime minister, Obuchi was focused on two major issues: signing a peace treaty with Russia and reviving the Japanese economy of the Lost Decade. His solution to the latter was to increase public spending and lowering income taxes, which briefly slowed the recession but ultimately did very little to turn it around. One of his government actions was to give shopping coupons to 35 million citizens in the hope it would spark a consumer boom. Obuchi's Russia policy also eluded implementation before his death. Obuchi's fiscal policy focused on strengthening the core capital requirements for financial institutions while issuing more Japanese government bonds to finance public infrastructure, which boosted the rising Japanese public debt. His economic policies became known as "Obuchinomics".

Obuchi was known to have regularly enjoyed playing squash at the courts in the Canadian Embassy in Tokyo's Azabu. Squash players tend to be very fit as it is excellent cardiovascular exercise, which was at odds with his depiction in Japanese media as gakeppuchi Obuchi (崖っぷち小渕, "Obuchi on the brink") which construed his poor physical health mirrored the precarious state of Japan's economy.

== Death ==
On 1 April 2000, Obuchi suffered a massive stroke and slipped into a coma at Tokyo's Juntendo University Hospital while still in office. When it became apparent that he was unable to recover, he was replaced by Yoshirō Mori on 5 April. Obuchi died on 14 May at the age of 62; a state funeral was held in his honour at the Nippon Budokan on 8 June and was attended by foreign dignitaries from 156 countries and 22 organizations, including about 25 heads of state. Attendees at the funeral included UN Secretary General Kofi Annan, U.S. president Bill Clinton, and South Korean president Kim Dae-jung.

== Personal life ==
Obuchi married environmental essayist Chizuko Ono in 1967. They were introduced by Tomisaburo Hashimoto, a Diet member and relative of Prime Minister Ryutaro Hashimoto. They had one son and two daughters. Their younger daughter, Yūko Obuchi, ran for and was elected to the former prime minister's Diet seat in the 2000 election. Obuchi was a great fan of the works of the late historical novelist Ryōtarō Shiba, and a particular admirer of Sakamoto Ryōma, a key figure in the events leading to the Meiji Restoration.

Obuchi also had the unusual hobby of collecting figures of oxen. It relates to the fact that he was born in the Year of the Ox, the second year of the Chinese zodiac. He started collecting the figures following his initial election to the Diet in 1963, and after three and a half decades, the collection numbered in the thousands. He was also devoted to aikido and enjoyed golf as well.

== Honours ==
- Medal of Honour with Yellow Ribbon for Best Father (1999)
- Grand Cordon of the Order of the Chrysanthemum (14 May 2000; posthumous)
- Senior Second Rank (14 May 2000; posthumous)
- Golden Pheasant Award of the Scout Association of Japan (1998)
- Grand Cross of the Order of the Sun of Peru (1999)

== Election history ==
Election	Age	District	Political party	Number of votes	election results
1963 Japanese general election	26	Gunma 3rd district	LDP	47,350	winning
1967 Japanese general election	29	Gunma 3rd district	LDP	61,543	winning
1969 Japanese general election	32	Gunma 3rd district	LDP	50,185	winning
1972 Japanese general election	35	Gunma 3rd district	LDP	37,258	winning
1976 Japanese general election	39	Gunma 3rd district	LDP	76,012	winning
1979 Japanese general election	42	Gunma 3rd district	LDP	62,375	winning
1980 Japanese general election	42	Gunma 3rd district	LDP	59,647	winning
1983 Japanese general election	46	Gunma 3rd district	LDP	49,028	winning
1986 Japanese general election	49	Gunma 3rd district	LDP	75,289	winning
1990 Japanese general election	52	Gunma 3rd district	LDP	76,932	winning
1993 Japanese general election	56	Gunma 3rd district	LDP	89,440	winning
1996 Japanese general election	59	Gunma 5th district	LDP	127,052	winning

Party political offices
Preceded by Ichirō Ozawa	Secretary-General of the Liberal Democratic Party; 1991	Succeeded by Tamisuke Watanuki
Preceded by Shin Kanemaru	Head of Heisei Kenkyūkai; 1992–1998	Succeeded by Tamisuke Watanuki
Preceded by Shin Kanemaru	Vice President of the Liberal Democratic Party; 1994–1995	Succeeded by Taku Yamasaki
Preceded by Ryutaro Hashimoto	President of the Liberal Democratic Party; 1998–2000	Succeeded by Yoshirō Mori
Political offices
Preceded by Asao Mihara	Director General of the Prime Minister's Office; 1979–1980	Succeeded by Taro Nakayama
Preceded by Asao Mihara	Director General of the Okinawa Development Agency; 1979–1980	Succeeded by Taro Nakayama
Preceded by Kiichi Miyazawa	Chief Cabinet Secretary; 1987–1989	Succeeded by Masajuro Shiokawa
Preceded by Yukihiko Ikeda	Minister of Foreign Affairs; 1997–1998	Succeeded by Masahiko Kōmura
Preceded by Ryutaro Hashimoto	Prime Minister of Japan; 1998–2000	Succeeded by Mikio Aoki; Acting
