= BMI (company) =

British multinational research firm

BMI, a FitchSolutions Company
- Type: Subsidiary
- Industry: Financial services; Research
- Founded: 1984
- Headquarters: 30 North Colonnade, Canary Wharf, London, England, United Kingdom
- Products: Daily Views, Research and Analysis, Data and Forecasting, Analyst Access
- Number of employees: ~500
- Website: www.fitchsolutions.com/bmi

BMI is a British multinational research firm and subsidiary of Fitch Solutions that provides macroeconomic, industry and financial market analysis, covering 22 industries and 200 global markets. It was founded in 1984 as Business Monitor International and in 2014 was acquired by Fitch Group. On July 30, 2018, BMI Research was integrated into Fitch Solutions as Fitch Solutions Macro Research and since 2023 has traded as BMI Country Risk and Industry Analysis. It has offices in London, Manchester, New York, Pretoria and Singapore.

== History ==
BMI Research was founded in 1984 as Business Monitor International by Richard Londesborough and Jonathan Feroze with an initial focus on Latin America. By 1994 it was producing 10 monitor newsletters and 25 business forecast reports.

In 1997, the company (then known as Business Monitor International) won the Queen's Award for export.

International office expansion began in 2008 with Singapore, followed in 2009 by New York, and in 2010 with Pretoria. In 2012, the company acquired Espicom Business Intelligence, "a UK-based company with a 30-year pedigree providing business intelligence on Medical Devices, Pharmaceuticals & Healthcare and Therapeutics across global markets".

On September 9, 2009, the company "received a substantial, non-controlling equity investment from Spectrum Equity Investors", which the private equity firm held until March 14, 2014, when Fitch Group announced that it had acquired the company (then still called Business Monitor International). In June, 2014, Richard Hall was appointed as CEO, and the firm re-branded as BMI Research in March, 2015. Richard Hall left the company in October 2015.

On July 30, 2018, BMI Research was integrated into Fitch Solutions as Fitch Solutions Macro Research.

Since 2023, the company has traded as BMI Country Risk and Industry Analysis or BMI, a FitchSolutions company.

== Clients ==
BMI's clients included corporations, investment banks, financial institutions, governments and academic institutions; among the academic institutions that subscribed to BMI Research were Cornell University, Nanyang Technological University, National University of Singapore, Northeastern University, San Diego State University, Stanford University, University of Alberta, University of Auckland, University of Melbourne, University of Minnesota, The University of Western Ontario, and others.

== Products ==
BMI offers daily views, research and analysis, data and forecasting, and analyst access across the following areas:

- Country Risk - Europe, Middle East and North Africa, Sub-Saharan Africa, Asia-Pacific, North America, Latin America
- Industry Research - Agribusiness, Automobiles, Banking, Consumer & Retail, Consumer Electronics, Crime, Defence & Security, Education & Labour, Food & Drink, Healthcare, Information Technology, Infrastructure, Insurance, Medical Devices, Metals & Mining, Oil & Gas, Petrochemicals, Pharmaceuticals, Power & Renewables, Real Estate, Telecommunications, Tourism, Trade & Investment Risk
- Commodity Price Forecasting - gold, copper, nickel, aluminium, lead, tin, zinc, iron ore, steel, crude oil, natural gas, thermal coal, coking coal, cocoa, coffee, sugar, milk, wheat, corn, soybean, palm oil, rice, cotton
- Operational Risk
- Advisory
- ESG Country (launched in 2024)
- Politics & GeoQuant (launched in 2024)
- Energy Transition (launched in 2024)

== Influence ==
BMI regularly offers commentary and analysis in the media, and the company's analysts have been quoted in media outlets such as Associated Press, Bloomberg News, CNBC, The Daily Telegraph, The Diplomat, Financial Times, Fortune (magazine), The Globe and Mail, Infrastructure Investor, Institutional Investor (magazine), The Japan Times, Le Monde, Reuters, The Wall Street Journal, and The Washington Post.
