= 2021 Japanese general election in Chugoku =

- October 31, 2021

All 31 seats to the House of Representatives
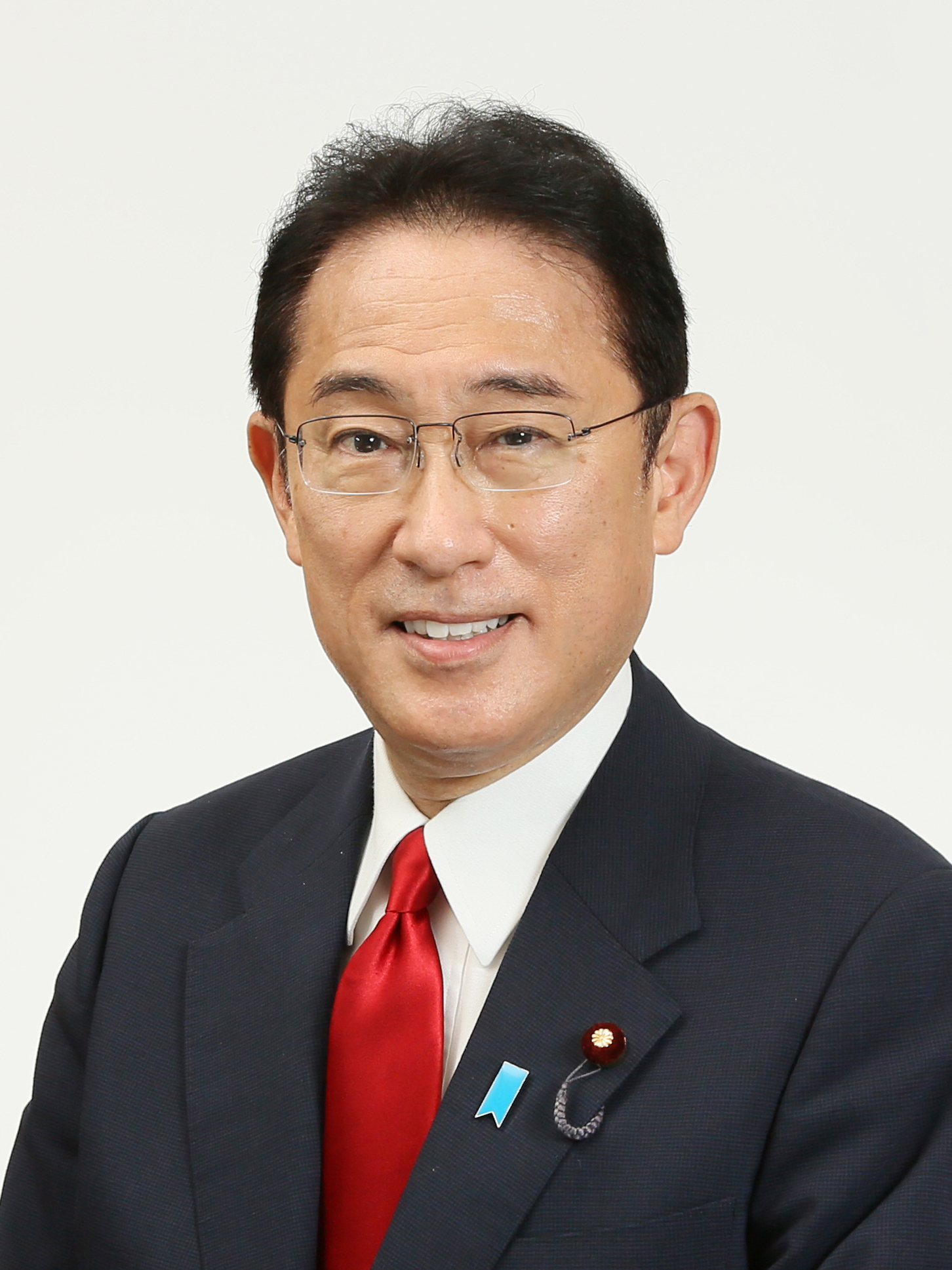

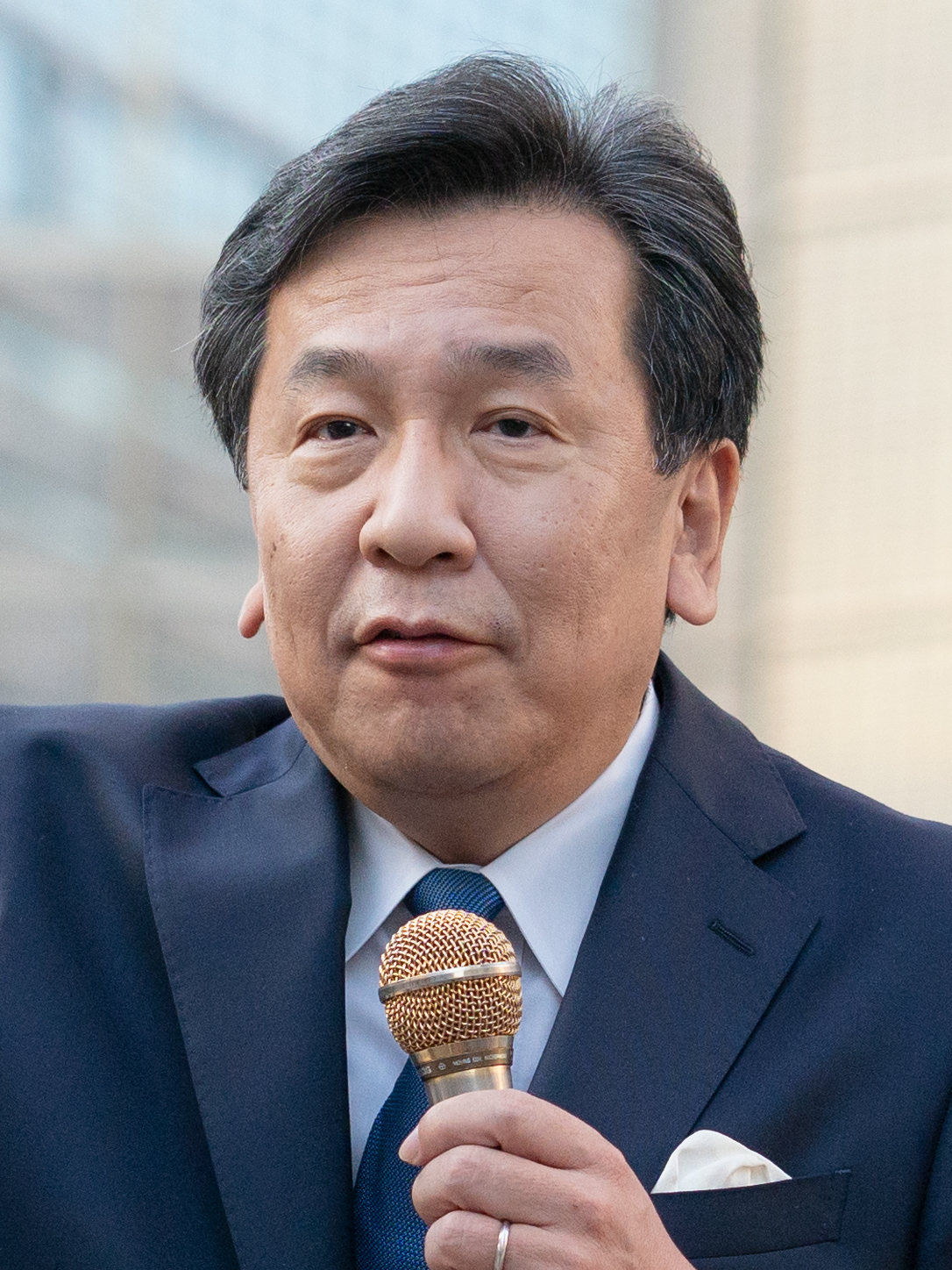

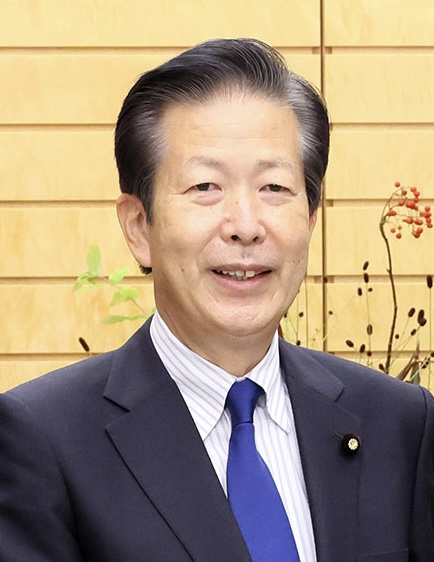

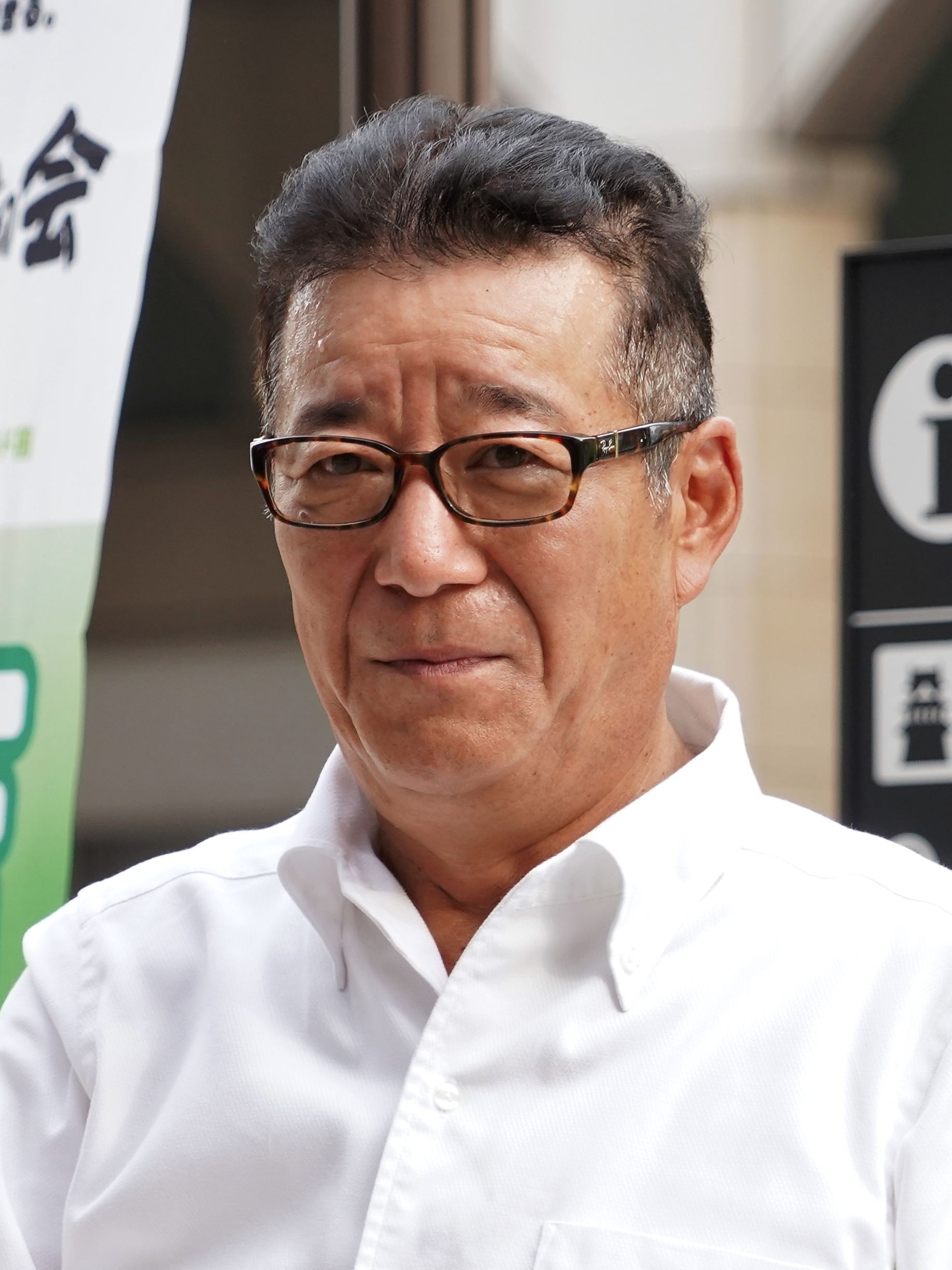
	Majority party	Minority party	Third party
Party	LDP	CDP	Komeito
Last election	23 seats	-	2 seats
Constituency	17	1	1
PR seats	6	2	2
Total	23	3	3
Seat change	Steady	New	▲1
	Fourth party	Fifth party
Party	Ishin	Independent
Last election	0 seats	1 seats
Constituency	0	1
PR seats	1	-
Total	1	1
Seat change	▲1	Steady

The 2021 Japanese general election in Chugoku were held on October 31, 2021, to elect the 31 representatives, one from each of 20 Electoral districts and 11 proportional seats.

== Tottori 1st district ==
2021 Tottori 1st district election
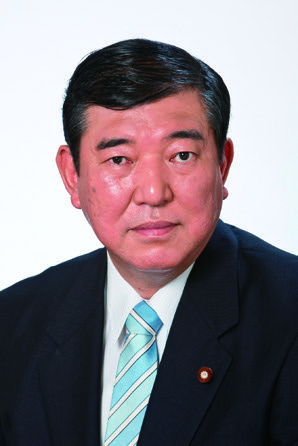
Nominee	Shigeru Ishiba	Masakazu Okada
Party	LDP	JCP
Popular vote	105,441	19,985
Percentage	84.07%	15.93%
Japanese Representative before election
Shigeru Ishiba
LDP
Elected Japanese Representative
Shigeru Ishiba
LDP

Incumbent				Elected Member	
Member	Party	First elected	Status	Member	Party
Shigeru Ishiba	LDP	1986	Incumbent reelected.	Shigeru Ishiba	LDP

== Tottori 2nd district ==
2021 Tottori 2nd district election
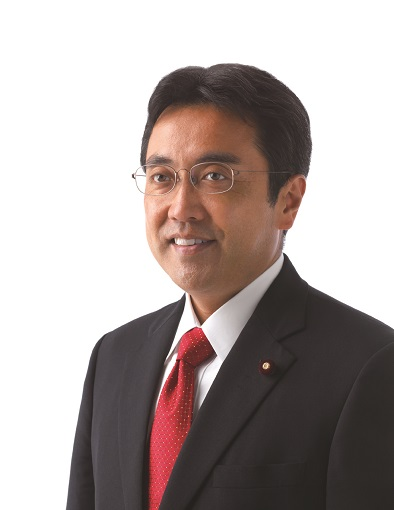
Nominee	Ryosei Akazawa	Shunji Yuhara
Party	LDP	CDP
Popular vote	75,005	63,947
Percentage	53.98%	46.02%
Japanese Representative before election
Ryosei Akazawa
LDP
Elected Japanese Representative
Ryosei Akazawa
LDP

Incumbent				Elected Member	
Member	Party	First elected	Status	Member	Party
Ryosei Akazawa	LDP	2005	Incumbent reelected.	Ryosei Akazawa	LDP

== Shimane 1st district ==
2021 Shimane 1st district election
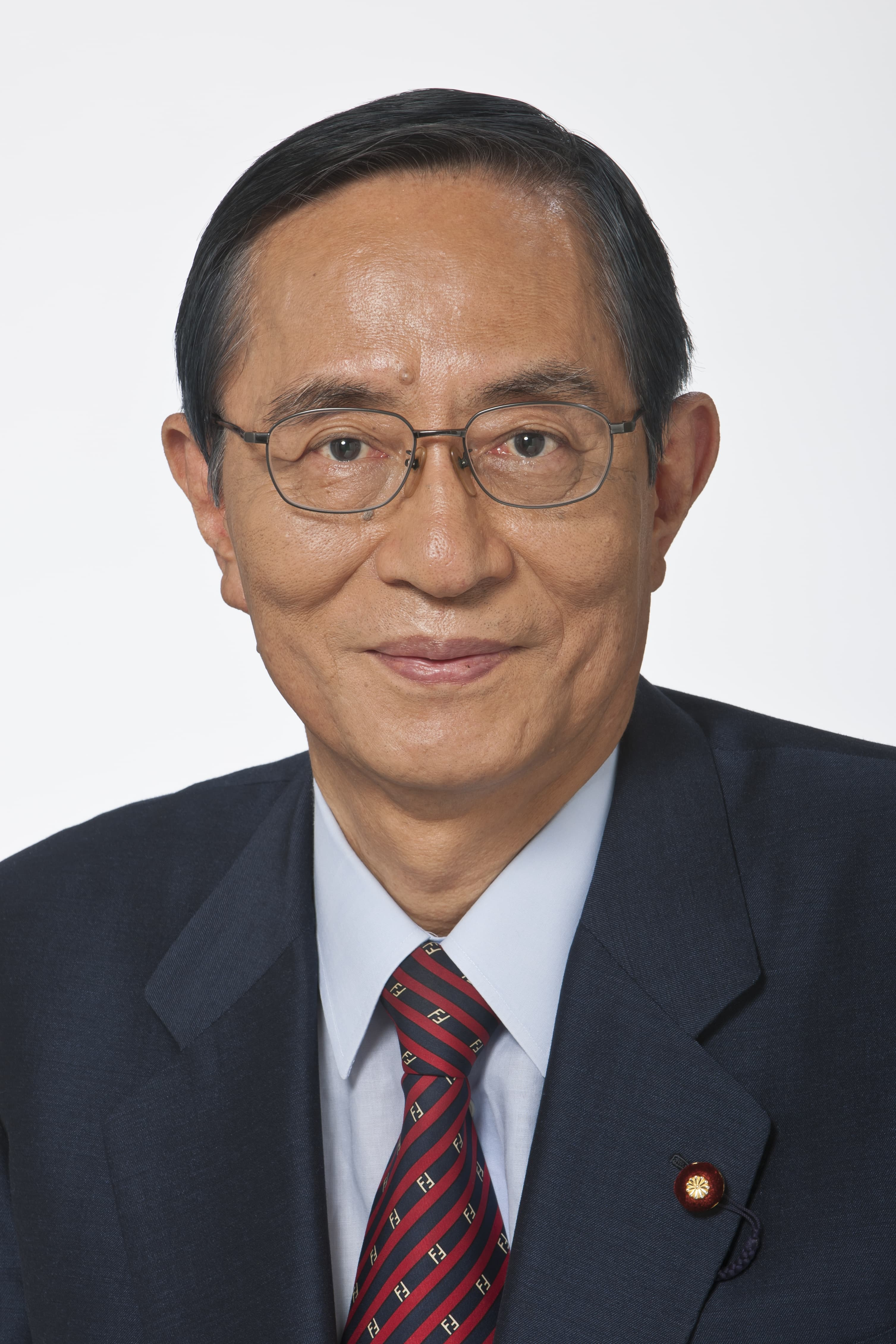

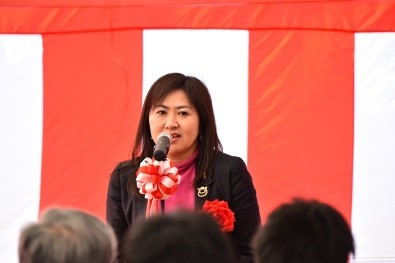
Nominee	Hiroyuki Hosoda	Akiko Kamei
Party	LDP	CDP
Popular vote	90,638	66,847
Percentage	56.02%	41.31%
Japanese Representative before election
Hiroyuki Hosoda
LDP
Elected Japanese Representative
Hiroyuki Hosoda
LDP

Incumbent				Elected Member	
Member	Party	First elected	Status	Member	Party
Hiroyuki Hosoda	LDP	1990	Incumbent reelected.	Hiroyuki Hosoda	LDP

== Shimane 2nd district ==
2021 Shimane 2nd district election
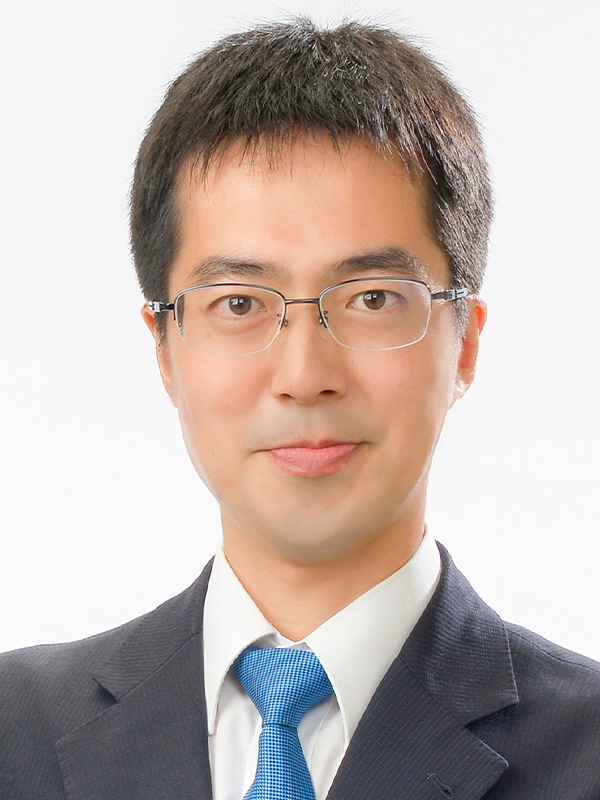
Nominee	Yasuhiro Takami	Homaru Yamamoto	Shinichi Mukose
Party	LDP	CDP	JCP
Popular vote	110,327	52,016	14,361
Percentage	62.44%	29.44%	8.13%
Japanese Representative before election
Vacant
Elected Japanese Representative
Yasuhiro Takami
LDP

Incumbent				Elected Member	
Member	Party	First elected	Status	Member	Party
Vacant (last held by Wataru Takeshita)	– (LDP)	ー	LDP hold.	Yasuhiro Takami	LDP

== Okayama 1st district ==
2021 Okayama 1st district election
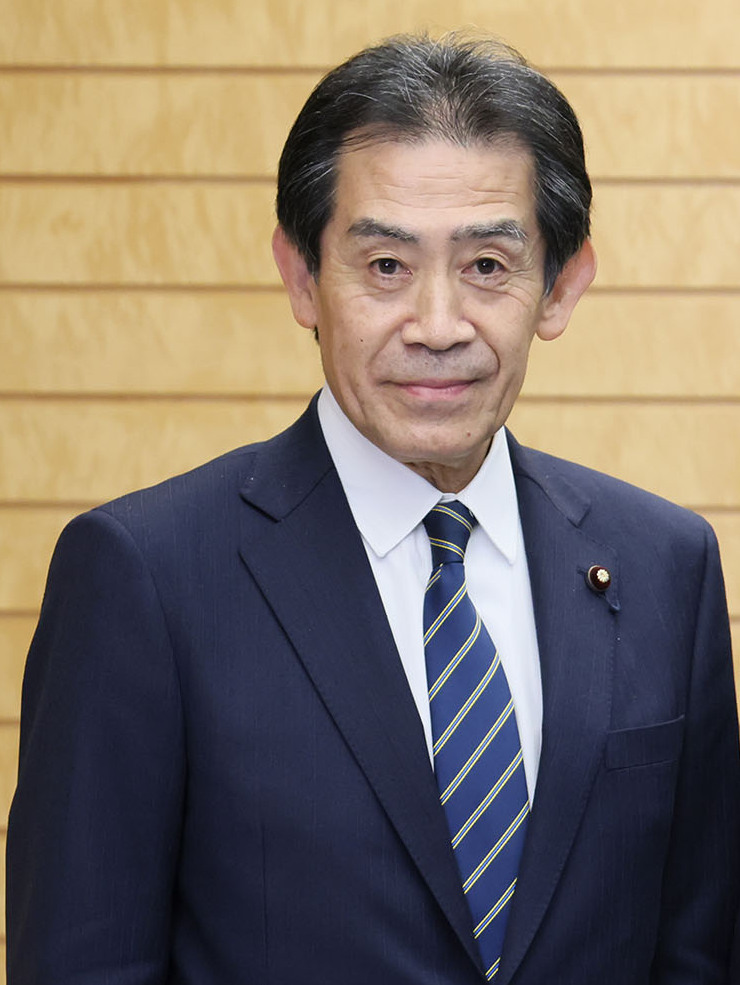
Nominee	Ichiro Aisawa	Kensuke Harada	Yukio Yoe
Party	LDP	CDP	JCP
Popular vote	90,939	65,499	8,990
Percentage	54.97%	39.59%	5.43%
Japanese Representative before election
Ichiro Aisawa
LDP
Elected Japanese Representative
Ichiro Aisawa
LDP

Incumbent				Elected Member	
Member	Party	First elected	Status	Member	Party
Ichiro Aisawa	LDP	1986	Incumbent reelected.	Ichiro Aisawa	LDP

== Okayama 2nd district ==
2021 Okayama 2nd district election
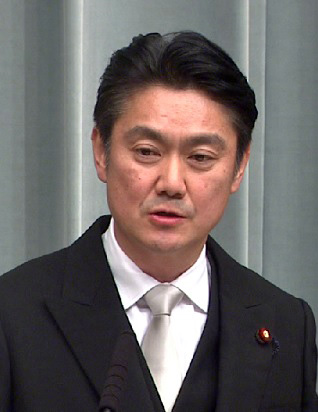

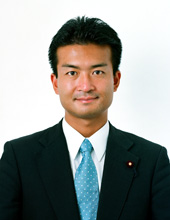
Nominee	Takashi Yamashita	Keisuke Tsumura
Party	LDP	CDP
Popular vote	80,903	62,555
Percentage	56.39%	43.61%
Japanese Representative before election
Takashi Yamashita
LDP
Elected Japanese Representative
Takashi Yamashita
LDP

Incumbent				Elected Member	
Member	Party	First elected	Status	Member	Party
Takashi Yamashita	LDP	2012	Incumbent reelected.	Takashi Yamashita	LDP

== Okayama 3rd district ==
2021 Okayama 3rd district election
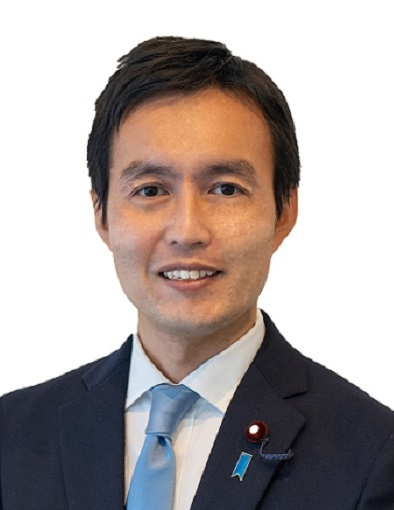

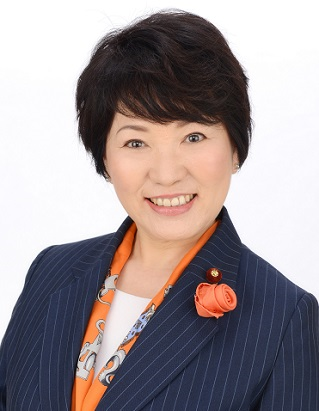
Nominee	Shojiro Hiranuma	Toshiko Abe	Sakae Morimoto
Party	Independent	LDP	CDP
Popular vote	68,631	54,930	23,316
Percentage	44.38%	35.52%	15.08%
Nominee	Hiroko Ozaki
Party	JCP
Popular vote	7,760
Percentage	5.02%
Japanese Representative before election
Toshiko Abe
LDP
Elected Japanese Representative
Shojiro Hiranuma
Independent

Incumbent				Elected Member	
Member	Party	First elected	Status	Member	Party
Toshiko Abe	LDP	2005	Incumbent defeated. (Won PR seat.)	Shojiro Hiranuma	Independent

== Okayama 4th district ==
2021 Okayama 4th district election
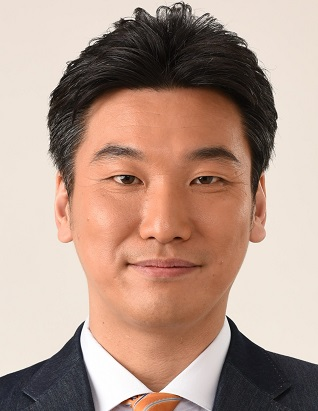

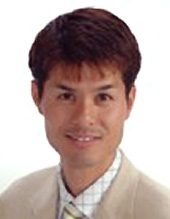
Nominee	Gaku Hashimoto	Michiyoshi Yunoki
Party	LDP	CDP
Popular vote	89,052	83,859
Percentage	49.73%	46.83%
Japanese Representative before election
Gaku Hashimoto
LDP
Elected Japanese Representative
Gaku Hashimoto
LDP

Incumbent				Elected Member	
Member	Party	First elected	Status	Member	Party
Gaku Hashimoto	LDP	2005	Incumbent reelected.	Gaku Hashimoto	LDP

== Okayama 5th district ==
2021 Okayama 5th district election
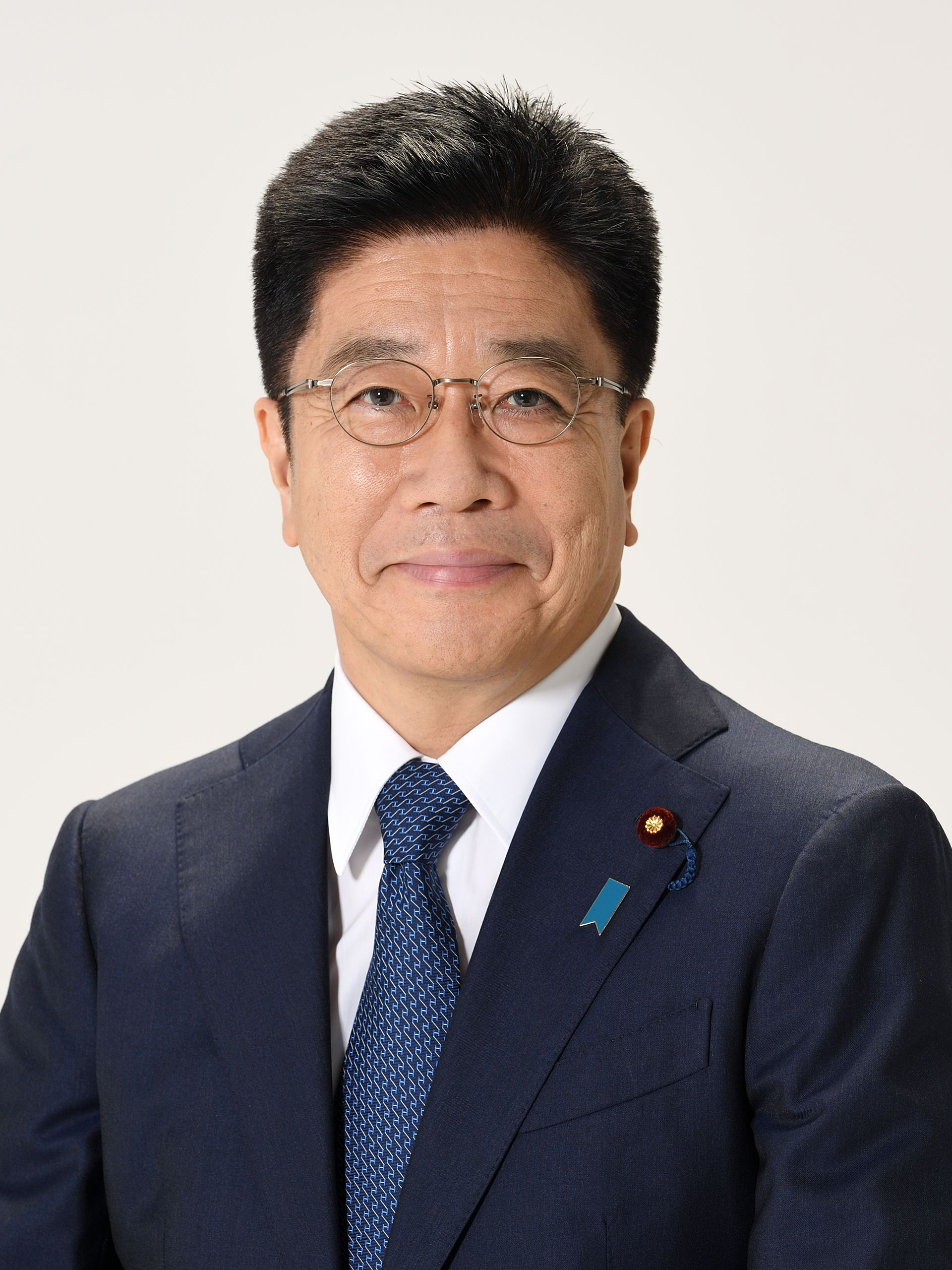
Nominee	Katsunobu Katō	Tomoko Hata	Yoshiaki Miimi
Party	LDP	CDP	JCP
Popular vote	102,139	31,467	7,067
Percentage	72.61%	22.37%	5.02%
Japanese Representative before election
Katsunobu Katō
LDP
Elected Japanese Representative
Katsunobu Katō
LDP

Incumbent				Elected Member	
Member	Party	First elected	Status	Member	Party
Katsunobu Katō	LDP	2003	Incumbent reelected.	Katsunobu Katō	LDP

== Hiroshima 1st district ==
2021 Hiroshima 1st district election
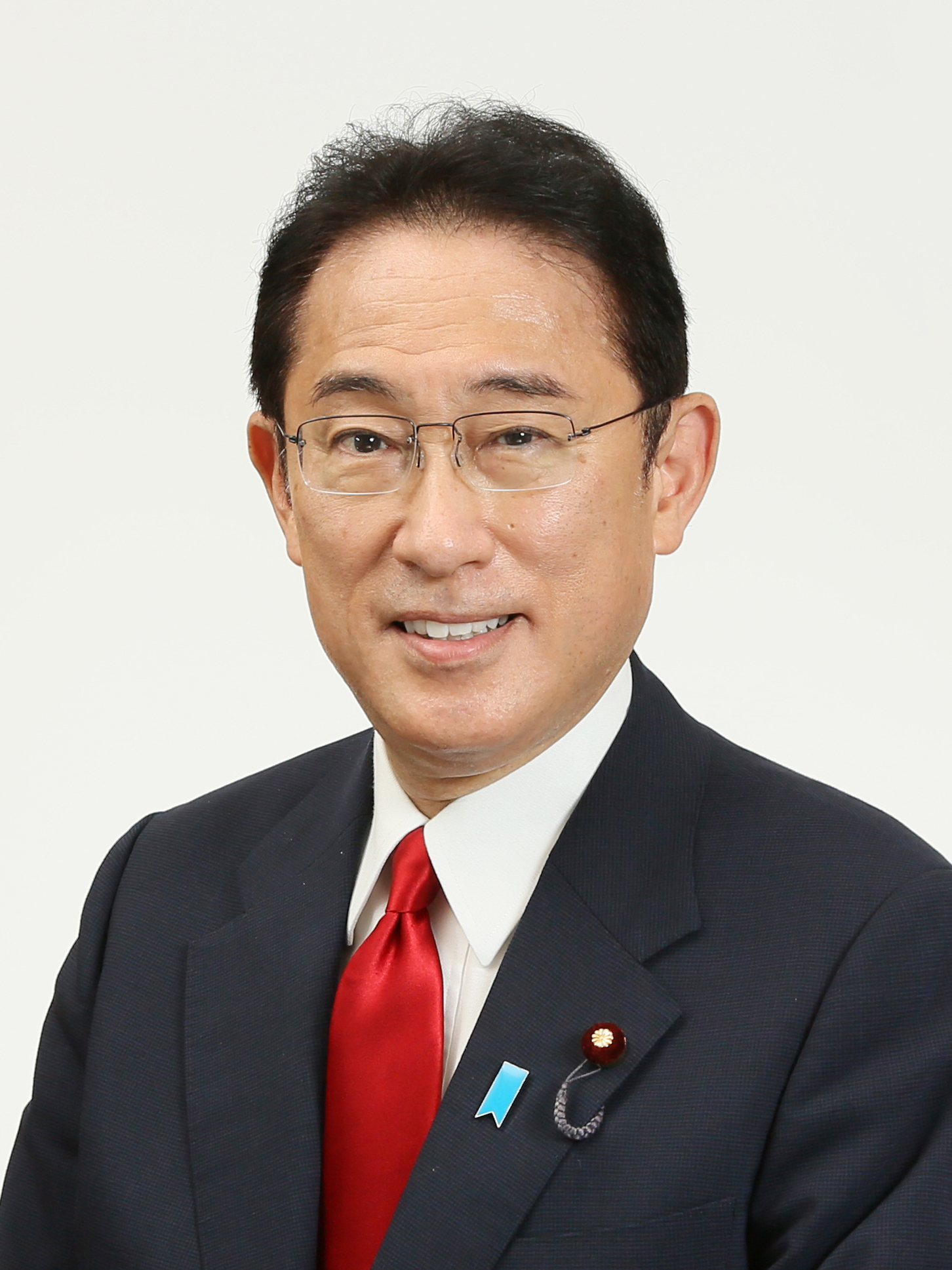
Nominee	Fumio Kishida	Yūko Arita	Osamu Ōnishi
Party	LDP	Social Democratic	JCP
Popular vote	133,704	15,904	14,508
Percentage	80.67%	9.60%	8.75%
Japanese Representative before election
Fumio Kishida
LDP
Elected Japanese Representative
Fumio Kishida
LDP

Incumbent				Elected Member	
Member	Party	First elected	Status	Member	Party
Fumio Kishida	LDP	1993	Incumbent reelected.	Fumio Kishida	LDP

== Hiroshima 2nd district ==
2021 Hiroshima 2nd district election
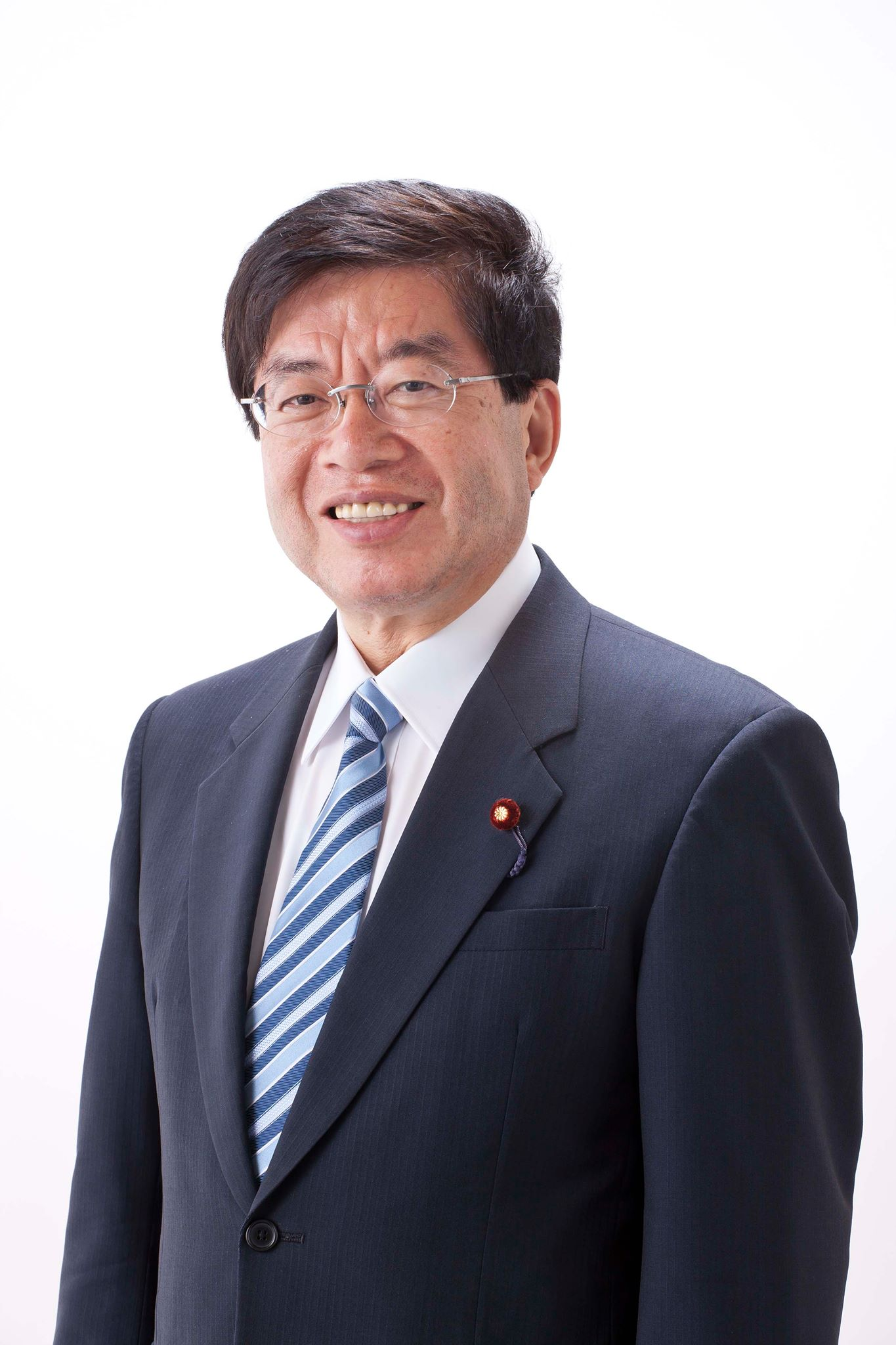
Nominee	Hiroshi Hiraguchi	Akai Ōi
Party	LDP	CDP
Popular vote	133,126	70,939
Percentage	65.24%	34.76%
Japanese Representative before election
Hiroshi Hiraguchi
LDP
Elected Japanese Representative
Hiroshi Hiraguchi
LDP

Incumbent				Elected Member	
Member	Party	First elected	Status	Member	Party
Hiroshi Hiraguchi	LDP	2005	Incumbent reelected.	Hiroshi Hiraguchi	LDP

== Hiroshima 3rd district ==
2021 Hiroshima 3rd district election
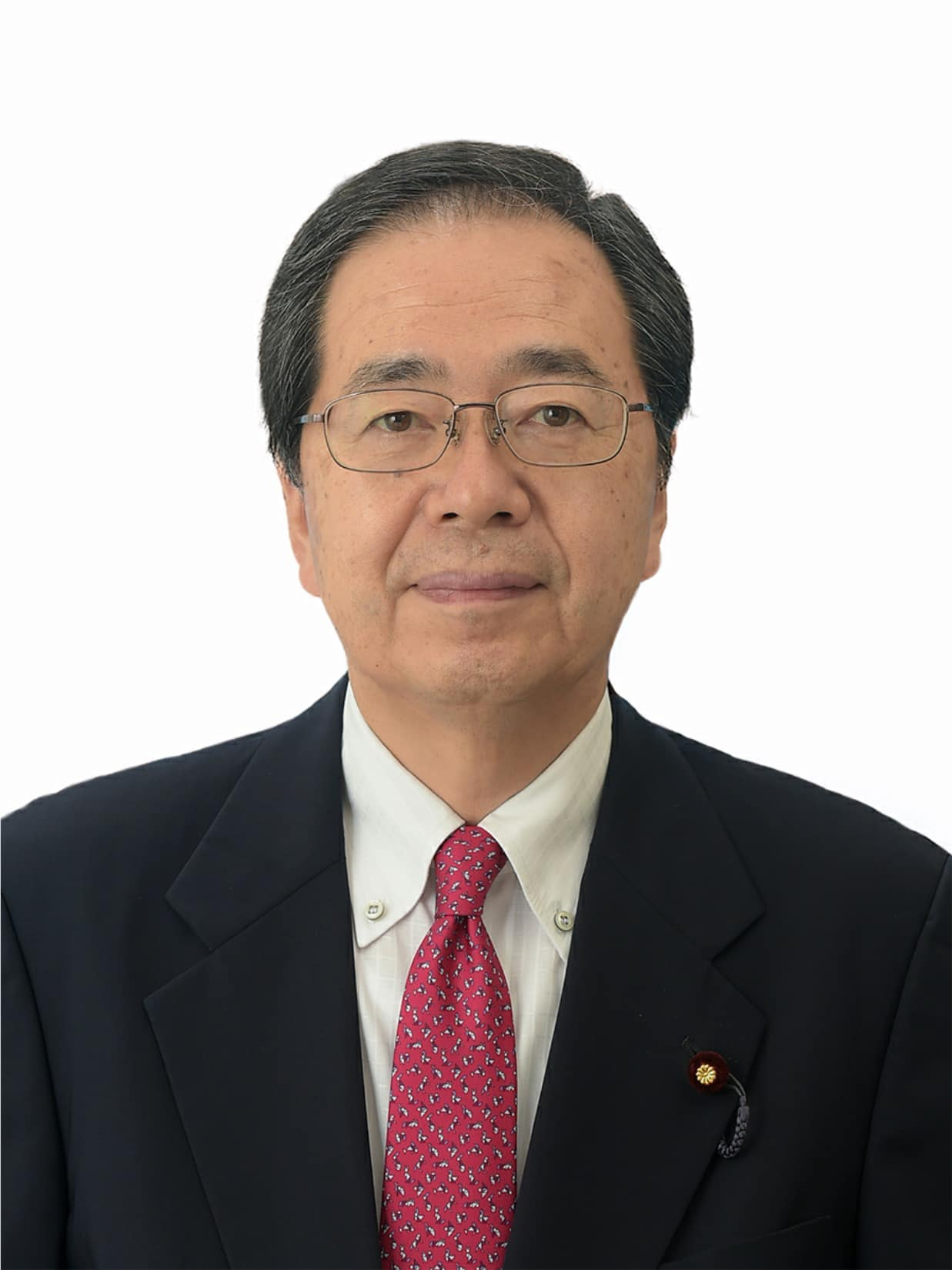
Nominee	Tetsuo Saito	Mayumi Ryan	Hirochika Segi
Party	Komeito	CDP	Ishin
Popular vote	97,844	53,143	18,088
Percentage	55.07%	29.91%	10.18%
Japanese Representative before election
Vacant
Elected Japanese Representative
Tetsuo Saito
Komeito

Incumbent				Elected Member	
Member	Party	First elected	Status	Member	Party
Vacant (last held by Katsuyuki Kawai)	– (Independent)	ー	Komeito pick up.	Tetsuo Saito	Komeito

== Hiroshima 4th district ==
2021 Hiroshima 4th district election
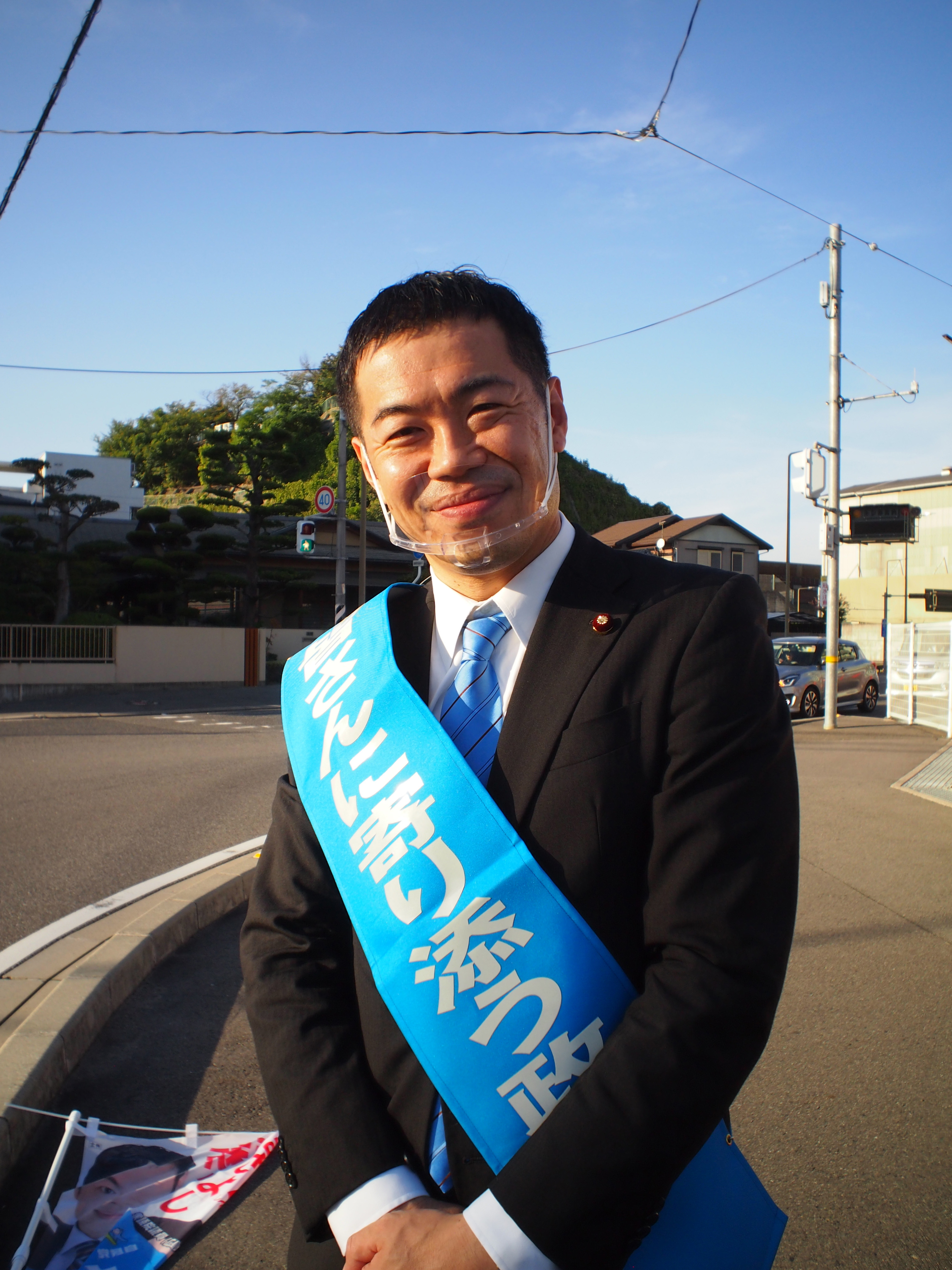

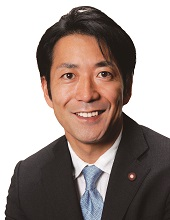
Nominee	Masayoshi Shintani	Kanji Ueno	Seiki Soramoto
Party	LDP	CDP	Ishin
Popular vote	78,253	33,681	28,966
Percentage	48.30%	20.79%	17.88%
Nominee	Toshinao Nakagawa
Party	Independent
Popular vote	21,112
Percentage	13.03%
Japanese Representative before election
Masayoshi Shintani
LDP
Elected Japanese Representative
Masayoshi Shintani
LDP

Incumbent				Elected Member	
Member	Party	First elected	Status	Member	Party
Masayoshi Shintani	LDP	2012	Incumbent reelected.	Masayoshi Shintani	LDP

== Hiroshima 5th district ==
2021 Hiroshima 5th district election
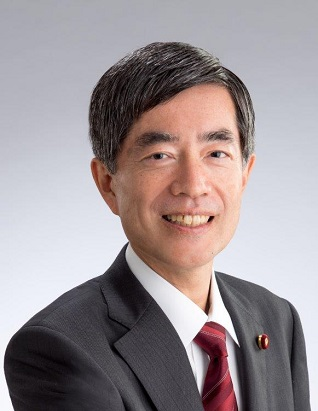
Nominee	Minoru Terada	Kojiro Nomura
Party	LDP	CDP
Popular vote	87,434	41,788
Percentage	67.66%	32.34%
Japanese Representative before election
Minoru Terada
LDP
Elected Japanese Representative
Minoru Terada
LDP

Incumbent				Elected Member	
Member	Party	First elected	Status	Member	Party
Minoru Terada	LDP	2004 (by-el)	Incumbent reelected.	Minoru Terada	LDP

== Hiroshima 6th district ==
2021 Hiroshima 6th district election
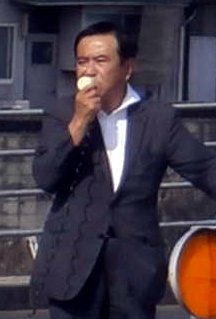

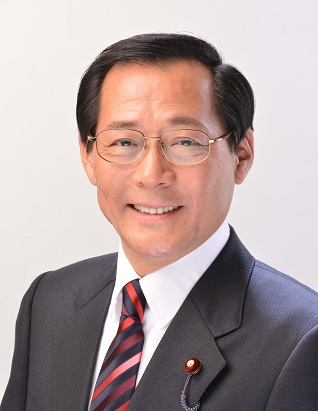
Nominee	Koji Sato	Toshifumi Kojima
Party	CDP	LDP
Popular vote	83,796	79,158
Percentage	51.42%	48.58%
Japanese Representative before election
Koji Sato
CDP
Elected Japanese Representative
Koji Sato
CDP

Incumbent				Elected Member	
Member	Party	First elected	Status	Member	Party
Koji Sato	CDP	2000	Incumbent reelected.	Koji Sato	CDP

== Hiroshima 7th district ==
2021 Hiroshima 7th district election
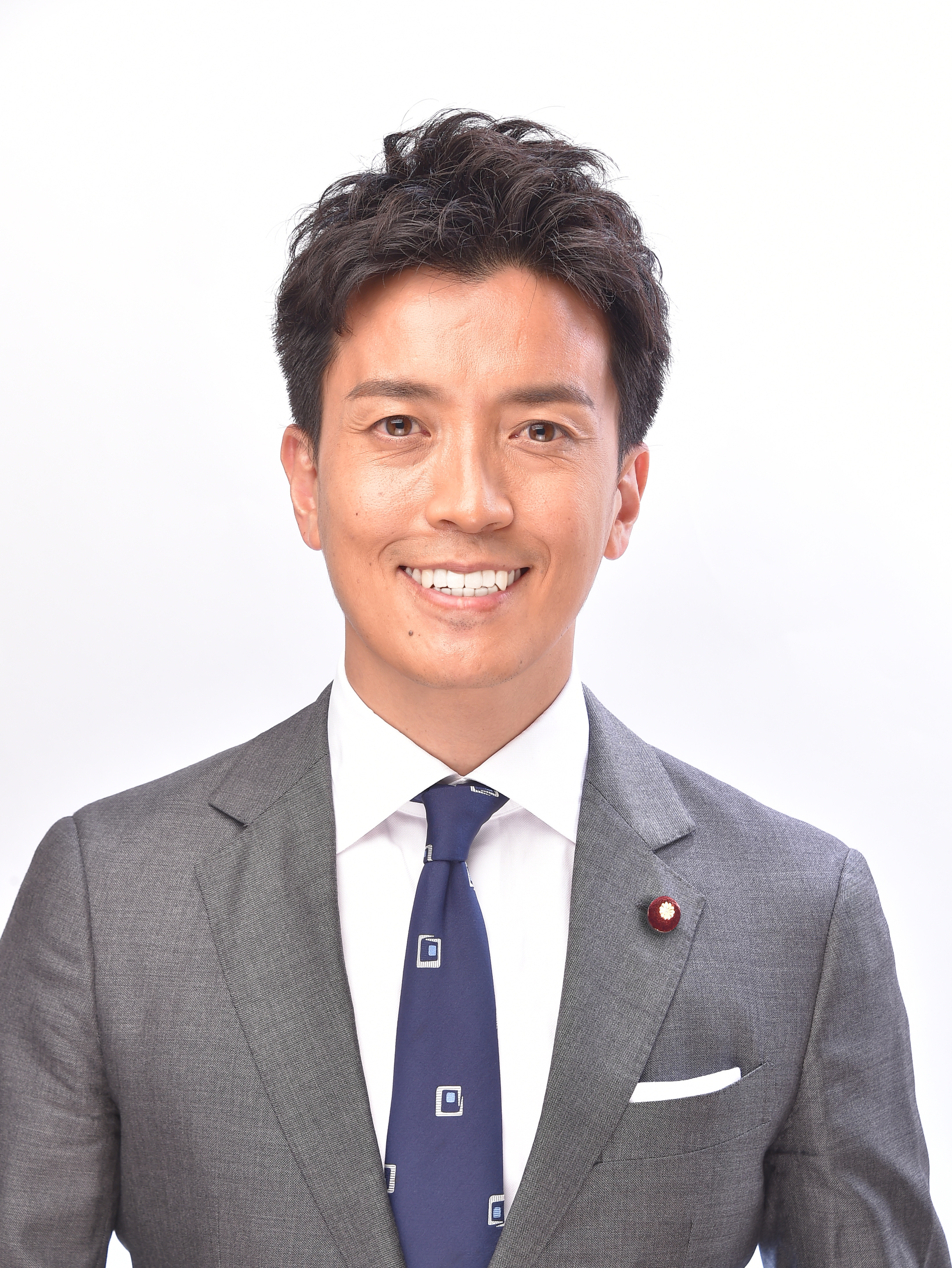
Nominee	Fumiaki Kobayashi	Hironori Sato	Akemi Murai
Party	LDP	CDP	JCP
Popular vote	123,396	45,520	11,580
Percentage	66.45%	24.51%	6.24%
Japanese Representative before election
Fumiaki Kobayashi
LDP
Elected Japanese Representative
Fumiaki Kobayashi
LDP

Incumbent				Elected Member	
Member	Party	First elected	Status	Member	Party
Fumiaki Kobayashi	LDP	2012	Incumbent reelected.	Fumiaki Kobayashi	LDP

== Yamaguchi 1st district ==
2021 Yamaguchi 1st district election
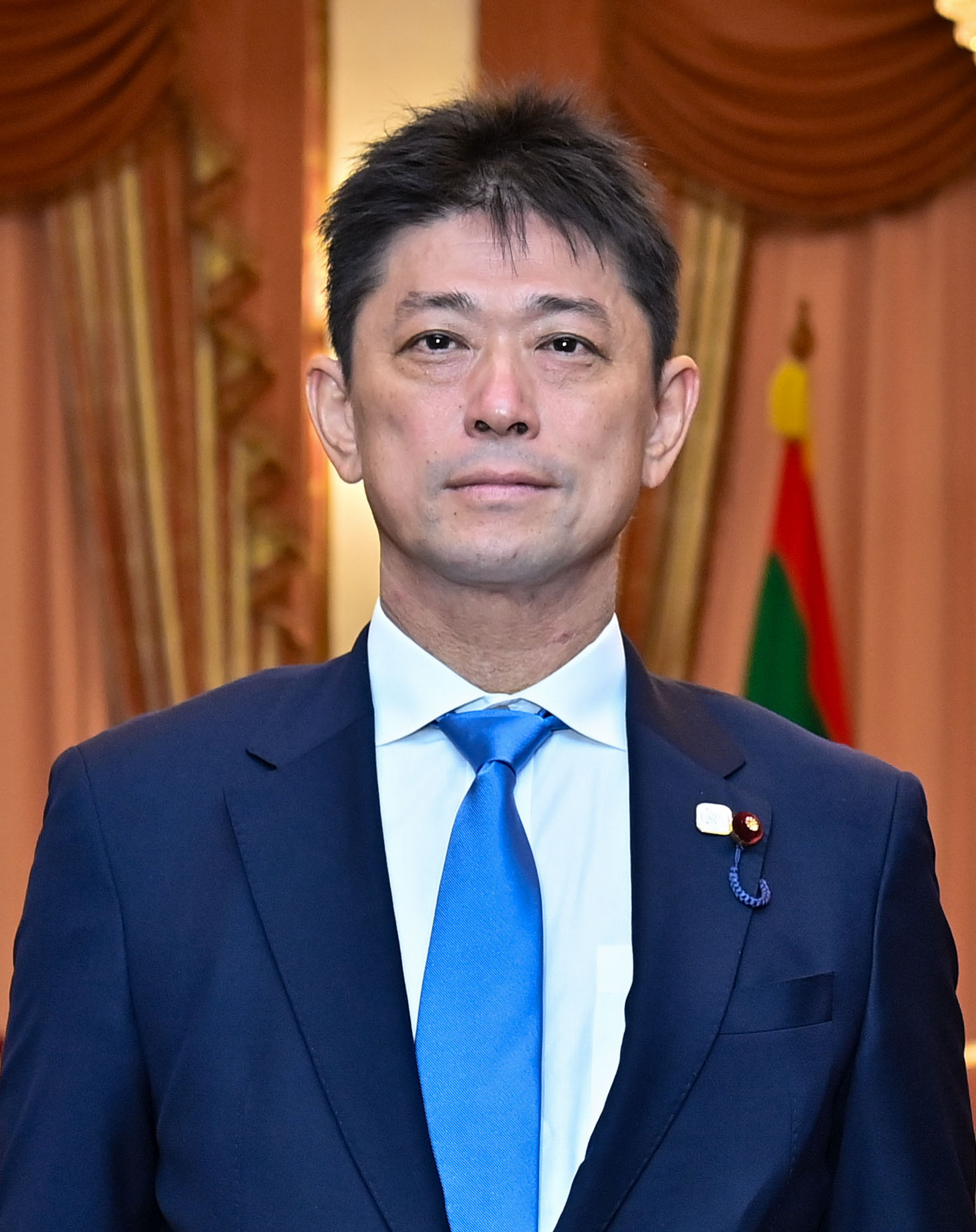
Nominee	Masahiro Kōmura	Kazuya Ōuchi
Party	LDP	CDP
Popular vote	118,882	50,684
Percentage	70.11%	29.89%
Japanese Representative before election
Masahiro Kōmura
LDP
Elected Japanese Representative
Masahiro Kōmura
LDP

Incumbent				Elected Member	
Member	Party	First elected	Status	Member	Party
Masahiro Kōmura	LDP	2012	Incumbent reelected.	Masahiro Kōmura	LDP

== Yamaguchi 2nd district ==
2021 Yamaguchi 2nd district election
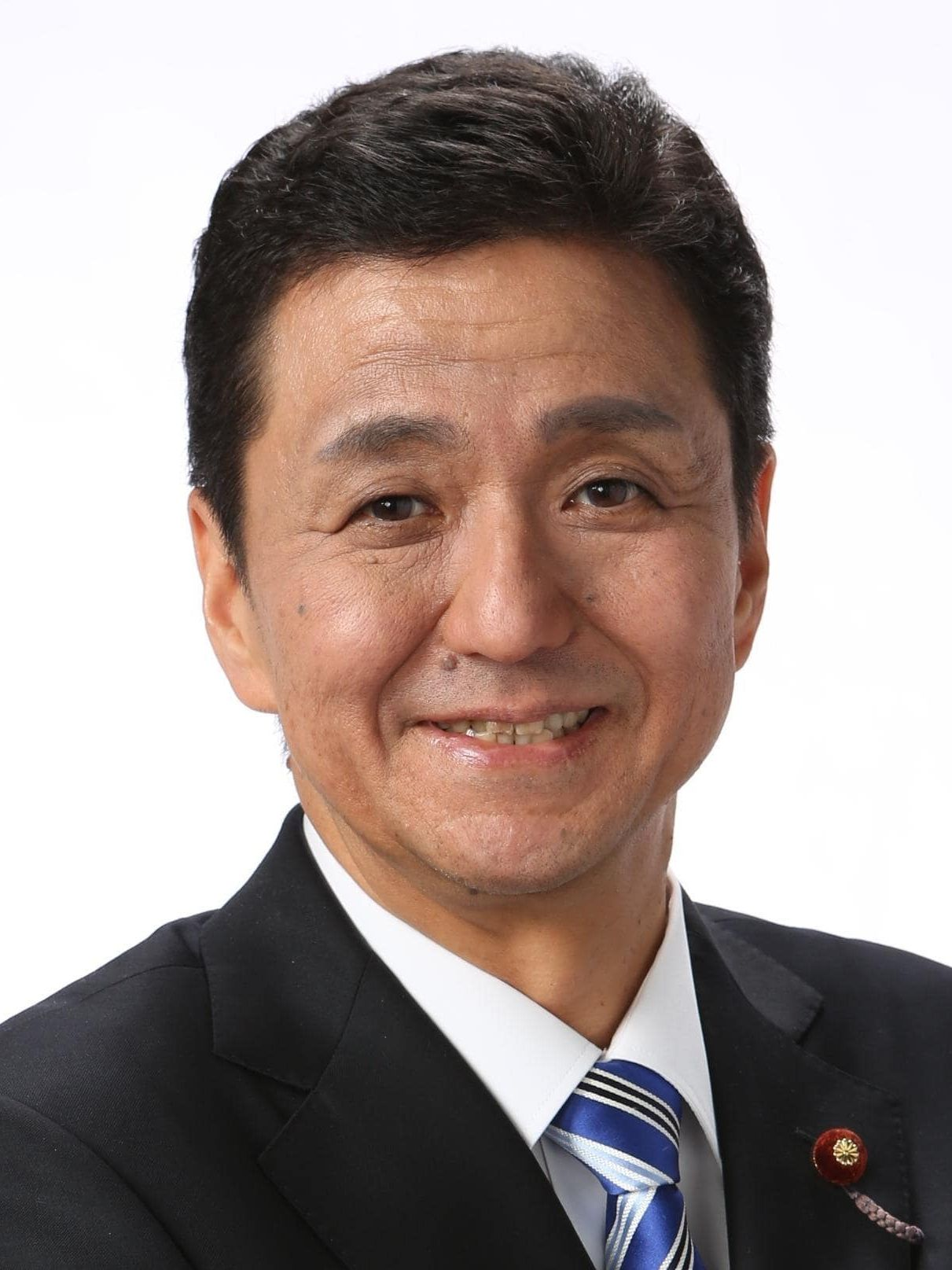
Nominee	Nobuo Kishi	Kazushi Matsuda
Party	LDP	JCP
Popular vote	109,914	32,936
Percentage	76.94%	23.06%
Japanese Representative before election
Nobuo Kishi
LDP
Elected Japanese Representative
Nobuo Kishi
LDP

Incumbent				Elected Member	
Member	Party	First elected	Status	Member	Party
Nobuo Kishi	LDP	2012	Incumbent reelected.	Nobuo Kishi	LDP

== Yamaguchi 3rd district ==
2021 Yamaguchi 3rd district election
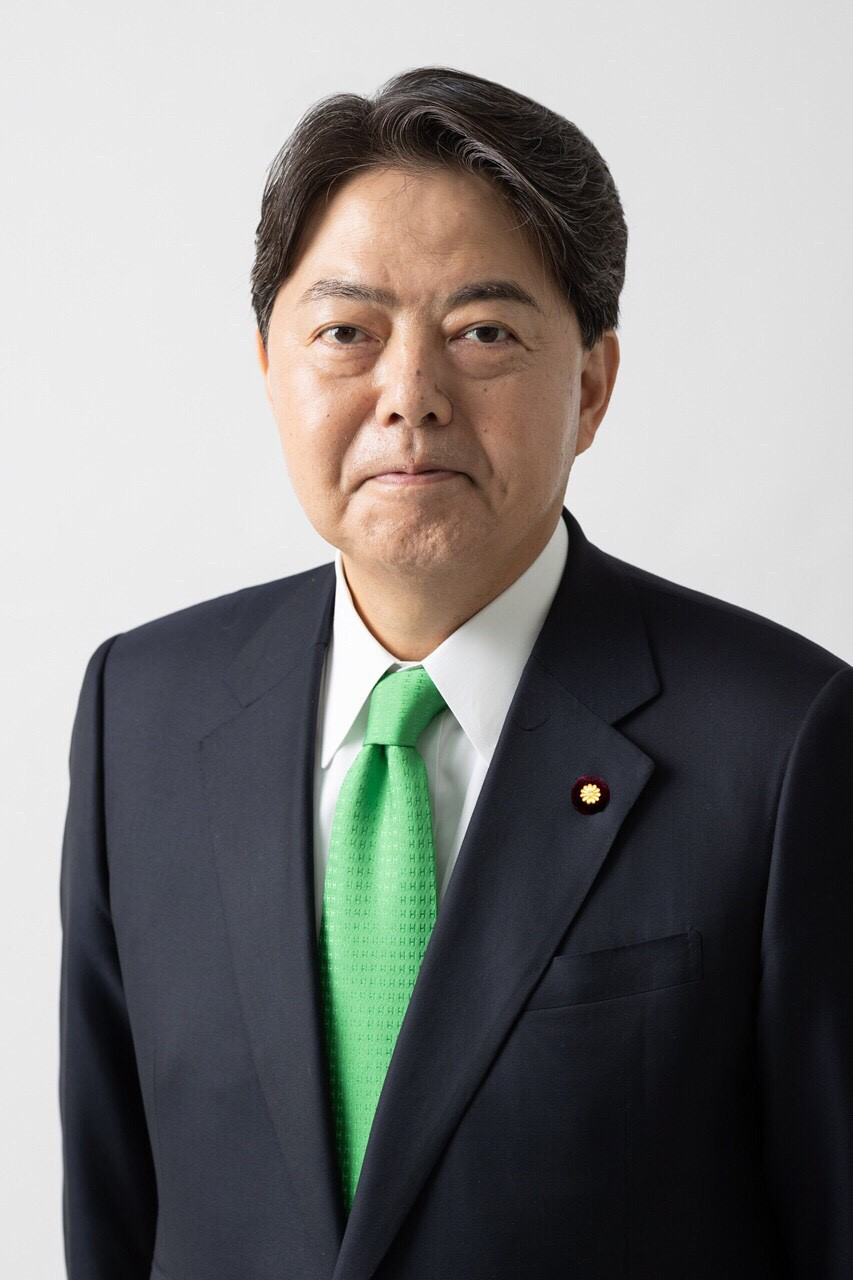
Nominee	Yoshimasa Hayashi	Fumiko Sakamoto
Party	LDP	CDP
Popular vote	96,983	29,073
Percentage	76.94%	23.06%
Japanese Representative before election
Takeo Kawamura
LDP
Elected Japanese Representative
Yoshimasa Hayashi
LDP

Incumbent				Elected Member	
Member	Party	First elected	Status	Member	Party
Takeo Kawamura	LDP	1990	Incumbent retired. LDP hold.	Yoshimasa Hayashi	LDP

== Yamaguchi 4th district ==
2021 Yamaguchi 4th district election
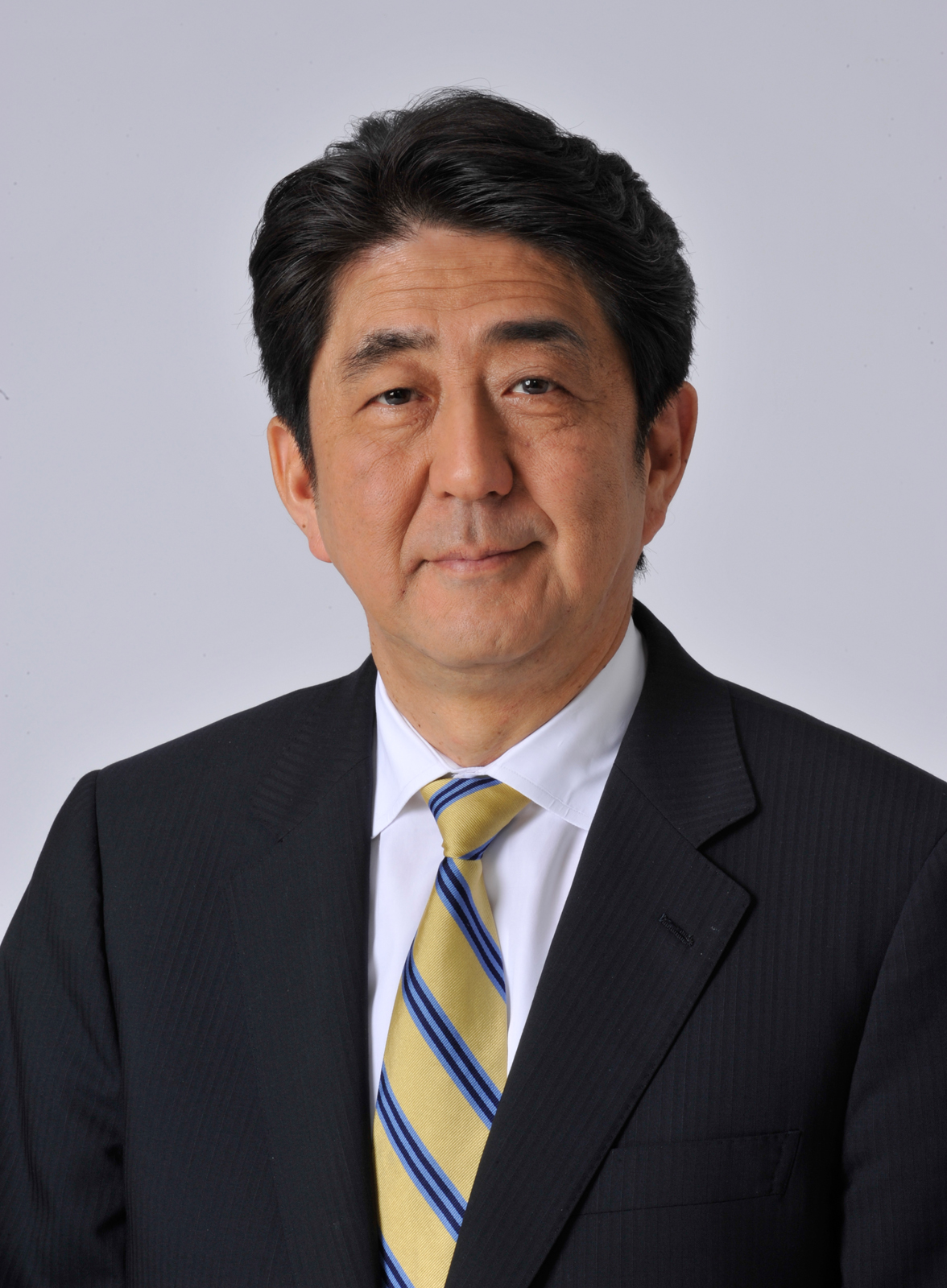

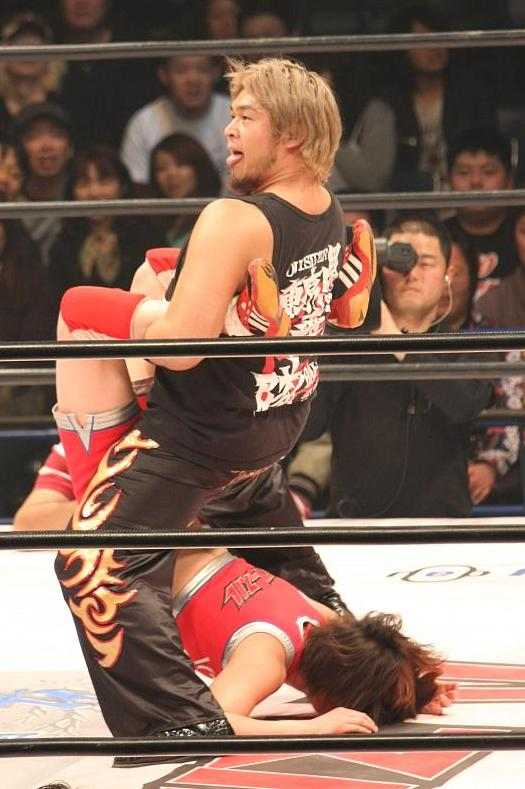
Nominee	Shinzo Abe	Katsushi Takemura	Yoriko Ōno
Party	LDP	Reiwa	Independent
Popular vote	80,448	19,096	15,836
Percentage	69.72%	16.55%	13.73%
Japanese Representative before election
Shinzo Abe
LDP
Elected Japanese Representative
Shinzo Abe
LDP

Incumbent				Elected Member	
Member	Party	First elected	Status	Member	Party
Shinzo Abe	LDP	1993	Incumbent reelected.	Shinzo Abe	LDP

== Proportional representation block ==
Proportional Representation block results
Party	Votes	Percentage	Seats
LDP	1,352,723	43.4%	6
CDP	573,324	18.4%	2
Komeito	436,220	14.0%	2
Ishin	286,302	9.2%	1
Communist	173,117	5.5%	0
DPP	113,898	3.7%	0
Reiwa	94,446	3.0%	0
SDP	52,638	1.7%	0
Anti-NHK	36,758	1.2%	0

Party	Elected Member	District
LDP	Rintaro Ishibashi	ー
LDP	Toshifumi Kojima	Hiroshima 6th
LDP	Toshiko Abe	Okayama 3rd
LDP	Emiko Takagai	ー
LDP	Mio Sugita	ー
LDP	Shōgo Azemoto	ー
CDP	Michiyoshi Yunoki	Okayama 4th
CDP	Shunji Yuhara	Tottori 2nd
Komeito	Akira Hirabayashi	ー
Komeito	Masaki Kusaka	ー
Ishin	Seiki Soramoto	Hiroshima 4th
