= Masuhara =

Masuhara is a surname. Notable people with the surname include:

- Mitsuyuki Masuhara (born 1973), Japanese anime film director
- Miyuu Masuhara (born 2001), Japanese ice hockey goaltender
- Yoshitake Masuhara (born 1945), Japanese politician
