= Katsuyuki Kawai =

Japanese politician

- 河井 克行
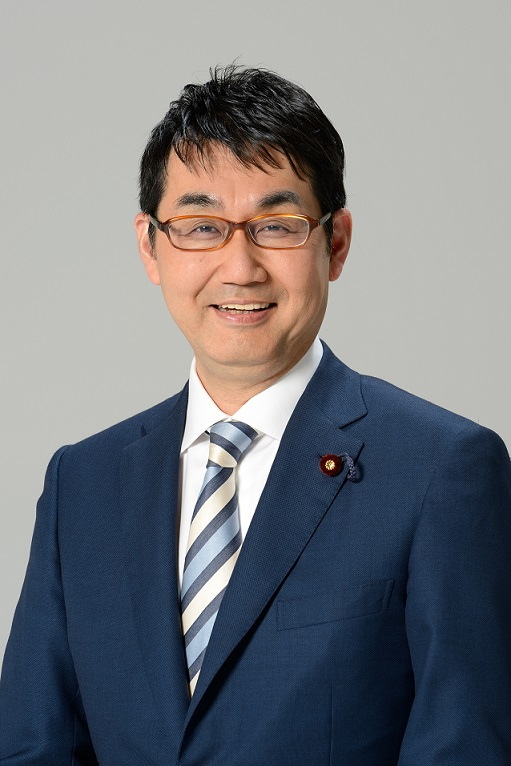
- Official portrait, 2016

Minister of Justice
- In office 11 September 2019 – 31 October 2019
- Prime Minister: Shinzo Abe
- Preceded by: Takashi Yamashita
- Succeeded by: Masako Mori

Member of the House of Representatives
- In office 10 November 2003 – 1 April 2021
- Preceded by: Multi-member district
- Succeeded by: Tetsuo Saito
- Constituency: Chūgoku PR (2003–2005); Hiroshima 3rd (2005–2009); Chūgoku PR (2009–2012); Hiroshima 3rd (2012–2021)
- In office 21 October 1996 – 2 June 2000
- Preceded by: Constituency established
- Succeeded by: Yoshitake Masuhara
- Constituency: Hiroshima 3rd

Member of the Hiroshima Prefectural Assembly
- In office 30 April 1991 – 1993
- Constituency: Hiroshima City, Asaminami Ward

Personal details
- Born: 11 March 1963 (age 63) Hiroshima, Japan
- Party: Independent
- Other political affiliations: Liberal Democratic
- Spouse: Anri Maeda (m. 2001)
- Education: Keio University

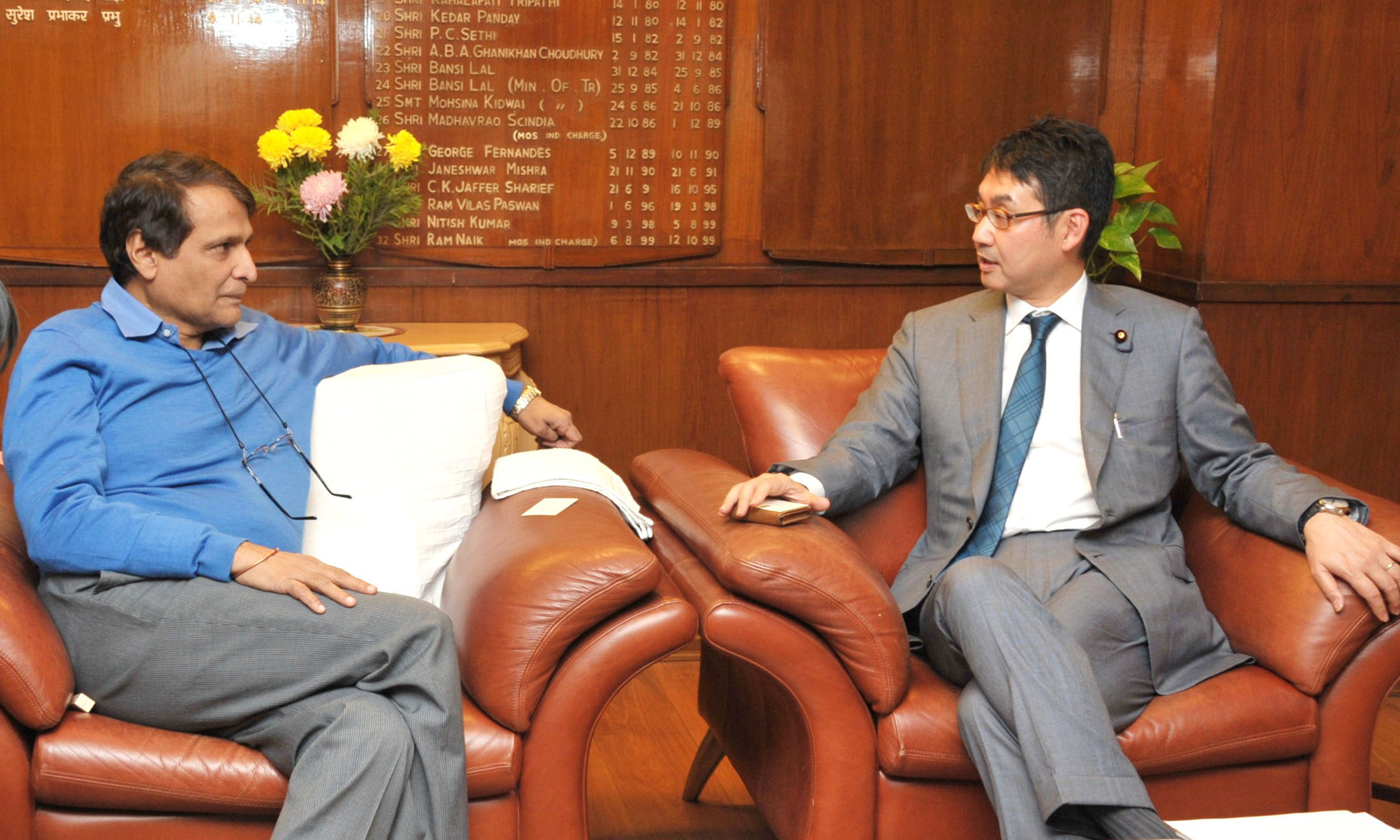
Katsuyuki Kawai meeting the Union Minister for Railways, Shri Suresh Prabhakar Prabhu, in New Delhi on November 18, 2015

Katsuyuki Kawai (河井 克行, Kawai Katsuyuki; born 11 March 1963) is a Japanese former politician of the Liberal Democratic Party (LDP), a member of the House of Representatives in the Diet (national legislature). A native of Hiroshima, Hiroshima and graduate of Keio University, he ran unsuccessfully for the House of Representatives in 1993 after serving in the assembly of Hiroshima Prefecture. After losing his seat in 2000, he was re-elected in 2003 and continued to serve multiple terms. In 2006, he was appointed as Director, National Defence Division of the LDP, and in 2021, he was selected as Chairperson of the House of Representatives Foreign Affairs Committee. In 2015, Kawai was appointed as Special Advisor to the Prime Minister during the Third Abe Cabinet’s first and second reshuffles. He was re-elected to the House of Representatives for a seventh term in 2017 and subsequently appointed as Special Advisor to LDP President Shinzo Abe for Foreign Affairs. In 2019, in the Fourth Abe Cabinet’s second reshuffle. He became Minister of Justice from 11 September 2019 to 31 October 2019. He stepped down as the Minister of Justice after reports of overpaying workers of Anri Kawai's political campaign beyond the legal limit.

On 16 June 2020, he and his wife, Anri Kawai, left the Liberal Democratic Party among allegations of buying votes to aid Anri Kawai's campaign for the House of Councilors. They were later arrested by public prosecutors on 19 June 2020, on charges for vote-buying and distributing around 25 million yen to 100 prefectural and city assembly members in Hiroshima in violation of the Public Office Elections Law.

In April 2021, Kawai resigned his position as Representative. On 18 June 2021, Kawai was sentenced to three years in prison and a fine of 1.3 million yen ($12,000) for vote buying.

In a subsequent development, Japan's Supreme Public Prosecutors Office admitted to conducting improper investigations in the case. According to a report by the Japan Federation of Bar Associations, a Tokyo prosecutor may have suggested to a former Hiroshima city assembly member that they could avoid indictment or receive a lighter penalty, despite not making an explicit promise. Additionally, another prosecutor was suspected of influencing the former assembly member's court testimony to align with the content of interrogation reports.

== Biography ==
=== Early years ===
Kawai was born in Mihara city, Hiroshima Prefecture, where he lived until kindergarten. The family rented two six-and-a-half mat rooms, and used the public bath. His elementary school years were in Asaminami Ward of Hiroshima, attending the Yasu Elementary School and then the Hiroshima Academy Junior and Senior High School.

In 1985 he graduated from the Faculty of Law at Keio University, specializing in political science, and then enrolled in the Matsushita Institute of Government and Management in Chigasaki. Among his classmates at the Institute were Nobuhiro Tanabe and Toshiyuki Nara, the mayor of Echizen. In 1988 he gained experience as an international trainee of local government in Office of Management and Budget of Dayton, Ohio. In 1990 he graduated from the Matsushita Institute and returned to Hiroshima.

=== Early political career and marriage ===
In 1991 Kawai stood for election in Asaminami Ward, and was elected to the Hiroshima Prefectural Assembly.

During the 1993 Japanese general election his bid for the House of Representatives was unsuccessful, coming in sixth out of eight candidates. In the 1996 Japanese general election he succeed in defeating Yoshitake Masuhara of the New Frontier Party, becoming the representative of from Hiroshima District Three. However, he lost this position in the 2000 Japanese general election to his former opponent Yoshitake Masuhara (at that time not affiliated with any political party); his supporters pointed out, "The main reason for your defeat is that you are still single." During the period when he was still bemoaning his election loss, a friend introduced him to Anri Maeda, an employee of the Science and Technology Agency; they had supper together in Tokyo, then went to a karaoke snack bar in Akasaka, where Anri sang Amagi-goe. It was love at first sight, and they decided to start a serious relationship that night. On 20 April 2001, they held their wedding in a Hiroshima hotel.

=== Appointments to high offices ===
Subsequently, Masuhara joined the LDP, and the two rivals agreed to use the so-called "Costa Rica system" under Japan's parallel voting system, in which they alternated running in the single-member tier or the proportional representation (PR) tier. In the 2003 election Kawai ran in the PR block, coming in second and thus returning to the National Diet, where he served as parliamentary secretary for the Ministry of Foreign Affairs under the Second and Third Koizumi Cabinets. In 2007, he became the State Minister of Justice in the First Abe Cabinet (2006–2007) and subsequent Fukuda Cabinet (2007–2008).

In the 2009 election he ran in the PR block, and was again elected. In June 2011 he joined the Kisaragi Kai, a newly formed political association centered on Kunio Hatoyama, who had been the Minister of Justice (2007-2008); Kawai served as chief secretary of the association.

By the mid-2010s, Kawai served as special advisor to Prime Minister Shinzo Abe. In October 2016, Kawai arranged for the attendance of Filipino-Chinese businessman Sammy Uy, a non-government official, in the meeting between Abe and Philippine President Rodrigo Duterte. Prior to the meeting, he made several visits to the Philippines which involved meetings with president Duterte and a visit to a drug rehabilitation center in the city of Taguig.

== Vote buying incident ==
=== Synopsis ===
Kawai Katsuyuki's wife Anri won a seat from the Hiroshima District in the 2019 Japanese House of Councillors election (21 July 2019), her first electoral win, against a background of Kawai's attempts to purchase votes for her between March and August of that year, distributing about 25.7 million yen ($280,000) in cash to about 100 politicians, mayors, and supporters. As a result of the election Kawai became Minister of Justice in the Fourth Realignment of the Second Stint Abe Cabinet, but as suspicions of voter bribery began to surface, he stepped down after six weeks (in office: 2019 September 11 until October 31). After further investigation, the final charges mentioned a total of 29 million yen to 100 officials.

=== Outcome ===
Katsuyuki Kawai In April 2021, Kawai resigned his position as Representative. On 18 June 2021, Kawai was sentenced to three years in prison and a fine of 1.3 million yen ($12,000) for vote buying. He began serving his term in the Tokyo Detention House.

Anri Kawai At the Tokyo District Court, on 20 January 2021, Anri Kawai was sentenced to a year and four months in prison, suspended for five years.

Recipients of bribes As of 6 July 2021, the Tokyo District Public Prosecutors Office is preparing to drop charges against all of the 100 local assembly members and others who allegedly received cash. Typically criminal charges will be brought against offenders who accept bribes of 1 million yen (about $9,024), but in this case arguments are being made that: (1) the bribes were forced on the recipients, and (2) they did not use the funds to buy votes (i.e. did not further distribute the funds through their political connections).

=== Illegal investigation by prosecutors: Some point to "false accusation” ===
In the election violation case involving former Minister of Justice Katsuyuki Kawai, the prosecution pursued charges exclusively against Kawai for vote-buying, despite the legal principle that both the giver and recipient of illicit payments are equally culpable under Japan’s Public Offices Election Act. As a result, approximately 100 local politicians who allegedly received cash were not prosecuted.

Kawai’s defense team criticized this approach as an "abuse of prosecutorial discretion" and a violation of the principle of "equality under the law." While plea bargaining is not legally permitted in election law violations in Japan, investigative reports by Yomiuri Shimbun in 2023 revealed that prosecutors had allegedly suggested to local politicians during interrogations that they would avoid indictment if they testified against Kawai.

In May 2024, a Tokyo District Public Prosecutor’s Office investigator reportedly admitted to guiding testimony in a similar case. The Japan Federation of Bar Associations (JFBA) stated in August 2023 condemning these prosecutorial practices, arguing that they undermine public confidence in the criminal justice system. Additionally, Japan’s judiciary has been noted for its high conviction rate, with the acquittal rate standing at 0.2% in 2023, according to JFBA data.

== Personal life ==
In media reports following a 2016 incident in which Kawai was accused of power harassment of a secretary, an underclassman from his elementary school told the news media that, "Kawai's nickname was 'Suneo' (arrogant rich boy in Doraemon series). He was from a well-to-do family who had a drugstore, and held himself apart from the rest of us. Everybody loathed him."

Kawai attended the Hiroshima Academy Junior and Senior High School, a private Catholic school founded by the Jesuits. During the papacy of Pope Benedict XVI (2005-2013), he visited the Vatican a total of six times, requesting a papal visit to Japan.

When Kawai's mother died in 2005, the funeral and memorial services were held in the Catholic Gion Church in Gion, Asaminami-ku, Hiroshima, with Kawai as the chief mourner.

When first accused of violating the Public Office Election Law, Kawai denied his guilt, but during questioning on March 23, 2021, he admitted the guilt, saying that "I made this decision in consultation with a priest with whom I have been in contact for over 20 years."

Political offices
Preceded by Takashi Yamashita	Minister of Justice; 2019	Succeeded by Masako Mori
