= Hiroshima 4th district =

Japan House of Representatives constituency

- Parliamentary constituency for the Japanese House of Representatives
- Numbered map of the Hiroshima Prefecture single seats
- Prefecture: Hiroshima
- Proportional District: Chūgoku
- Electorate: 389,763

Current constituency
- Created: 1994
- Seats: One
- Party: LDP
- Representative: Masayoshi Shintani
- Municipalities: Etajima, Higashihiroshima, Kure, and Takehara, Toyota District and part of Aki District (Kumano town).

Hiroshima 4th district (広島県第4区, Hiroshima-ken dai-yonku or simply 広島4区, Hiroshima-yonku) is a single-member constituency of the House of Representatives in the national Diet of Japan located in Hiroshima Prefecture.

== Areas covered ==
=== Since 2022 ===
- Etajima
- Higashihiroshima
- Kure
- Takehara
- Toyota District
- Part of Aki District
  - Kumano

=== 2013 - 2022 ===
- Part of Higashihiroshima
- Part of Hiroshima
  - Aki-ku
- Part of Mihara
- Aki District

=== 1994 - 2013 ===
- Higashihiroshima
- Part of Hiroshima
  - Aki-ku
- Part of Aki District
- Kamo District

== List of representatives ==
Election	Representative	Party	Notes
1996	Hidenao Nakagawa	LDP	
2000	Hidenao Nakagawa	LDP	
2003	Hidenao Nakagawa	LDP	
2005	Hidenao Nakagawa	LDP	
2009	Seiki Soramoto	Democratic	
2012	Toshinao Nakagawa	LDP	
2014	Toshinao Nakagawa	LDP	
2014	Toshinao Nakagawa	Independent	
2017	Masayoshi Shintani	LDP	
2021	Masayoshi Shintani	LDP	
2024	Seiki Soramoto	Ishin	
2026	Masayoshi Shintani	LDP	

== Election results ==
=== 2026 ===
2026
Party	Candidate	Votes	%	±%
LDP	Masayoshi Shintani	89,563	47.02	
DPP	Seri Nabeshima (elected in Chūgoku PR block)	61,335	32.20	New
Ishin	Seiki Soramoto	39,599	20.79	
Majority		28,228	14.82	
Registered electors		383,524		
Turnout			51.93	▲1.65
LDP gain from Ishin				

=== 2024 ===
2024
Party	Candidate	Votes	%	±%
Ishin	Seiki Soramoto	93,707	50.55	
LDP	Minoru Terada (Won PR seat)	91,653	49.45	
Majority		2,054	1.10	
Registered electors		388,800		
Turnout			50.28	▼2.90
Ishin gain from LDP				

=== 2021 ===
2021
Party	Candidate	Votes	%	±%
LDP	Masayoshi Shintani	78,253	48.30	
CDP	Kanji Ueno	33,681	20.79	New
Ishin	Seiki Soramoto (Won PR seat)	28,966	17.88	
Independent	Toshinao Nakagawa	21,112	13.03	New
Majority		44,572	27.51	
Registered electors		309,781		
Turnout			53.18	▲3.52
LDP hold				

=== 2017 ===
2017
Party	Candidate	Votes	%	±%
LDP	Masayoshi Shintani	64,911	43.64	
Ishin	Seiki Soramoto	28,562	19.20	New
Independent	Keiji Ebisu	20,366	13.69	New
Kibō no Tō	Kanji Ueno	16,803	11.30	New
JCP	Hitoshi Nakaishi	10,884	7.32	
Independent	Yoji Ochiai	7,210	4.85	New
Majority		36,349	24.44	
Registered electors		307,470		
Turnout			49.66	▲1.20
LDP gain from Independent				

=== 2014 ===
2014
Party	Candidate	Votes	%	±%
LDP	Toshinao Nakagawa	89,748	64.93	
Future Generations	Hiromu Nakamaru	26,977	19.52	New
JCP	Hitoshi Nakaishi	21,500	15.55	
Majority		62,771	45.41	
Registered electors		298,095		
Turnout			48.46	▼7.79
LDP hold				

=== 2012 ===
2012
Party	Candidate	Votes	%	±%
LDP	Toshinao Nakagawa	91,611	57.79	
Democratic	Seiki Soramoto	53,340	33.65	
JCP	Hitoshi Nakaishi	13,576	8.56	N/A
Majority		38,271	24.14	
Registered electors		295,992		
Turnout			56.25	▼14.53
LDP gain from Democratic				

=== 2009 ===
2009
Party	Candidate	Votes	%	±%
Democratic	Seiki Soramoto	102,435	50.28	
LDP	Hidenao Nakagawa (Won PR seat)	97,296	47.76	
Happiness Realization	Yuri Oki	4,003	1.96	New
Majority		5,139	2.52	
Registered electors		293,632		
Turnout			70.78	
Democratic gain from LDP				

=== 2005 ===
2005
Party	Candidate	Votes	%	±%
LDP	Hidenao Nakagawa	110,046	58.46	
Democratic	Seiki Soramoto	67,921	36.08	
JCP	Hitoshi Nakaishi	10,270	5.46	
Majority		42,125	22.38	
Registered electors				
Turnout				
LDP hold				

=== 2003 ===
2003
Party	Candidate	Votes	%	±%
LDP	Hidenao Nakagawa	86,275	54.74	
Democratic	Seiki Soramoto	49,784	31.59	New
Social Democratic	Hideaki Matsui	9,681	6.14	
JCP	Hitoshi Nakaishi	6,636	4.21	
Independent	Teiko Horima	5,225	3.32	New
Majority		36,491	23.15	
Registered electors				
Turnout				
LDP hold				

=== 2000 ===
2000
Party	Candidate	Votes	%	±%
LDP	Hidenao Nakagawa	102,900	63.99	
Social Democratic	Hideaki Matsui	40,526	25.20	New
JCP	Toshihide Kojima	17,390	10.81	
Majority		62,374	38.79	
Registered electors				
Turnout				
LDP hold				

=== 1996 ===
1996
Party	Candidate	Votes	%	±%
LDP	Hidenao Nakagawa	97,056	69.68	New
New Socialist	Tamie Akimitsu	27,875	20.01	New
JCP	Jun Nishioka	14,365	10.31	New
Majority		69,181	49.67	
Registered electors				
Turnout				
LDP win (new seat)				
