= Daisuke Matsumoto (politician) =

Japanese politician

- 松本 大輔
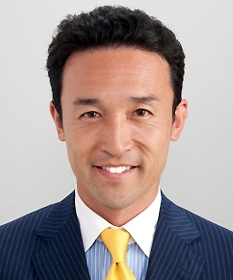

Member of the House of Representatives
- In office 9 November 2003 – 16 November 2012
- Preceded by: Toshinobu Awaya
- Succeeded by: Hiroshi Hiraguchi
- Constituency: Hiroshima 2nd (2003–2005); Chūgoku PR (2005–2009); Hiroshima 2nd (2009–2012)

Personal details
- Born: 5 August 1971 (age 55) Hiroshima, Japan
- Party: Democratic (2003–2016)
- Other political affiliations: DP (2016–2017); KnT (2017)
- Education: University of Tokyo

Daisuke Matsumoto (松本 大輔, Matsumoto Daisuke; born 5 August 1971) is a former Japanese politician of the Democratic Party of Japan, who served as a member of the House of Representatives in the Diet (national legislature).

== Early life ==
Matsumoto is a native of Hiroshima, Hiroshima and graduated from the University of Tokyo. He worked at The Bank of Tokyo (now part of The Bank of Tokyo-Mitsubishi UFJ) from 1995 to 2000.

== Political career ==
He was elected to the House of Representatives for the first time in 2003. He was defeated in the 2005 election. He was reelected in 2009.
