= Hiroshima 2nd district =

Japan House of Representatives constituency

- Parliamentary constituency for the Japanese House of Representatives
- Numbered map of the Hiroshima Prefecture single seats
- Prefecture: Hiroshima
- Proportional District: Chūgoku
- Electorate: 387,419

Current constituency
- Created: 1994
- Seats: One
- Party: LDP
- Representative: Hiroshi Hiraguchi
- Municipalities: Nishi-ku and Saeki-ku of Hiroshima, Hatsukaichi, and Ōtake.

Hiroshima 2nd district (広島県第2区, Hiroshima-ken dai-niku or simply 広島2区, Hiroshima-niku) is a single-member constituency of the House of Representatives in the national Diet of Japan located in Hiroshima Prefecture.

== Areas covered ==
=== Since 2022 ===
- Part of Hiroshima
  - Nishi-ku
  - Saeki-ku
- Hatsukaichi
- Ōtake

== List of representatives ==
Election	Representative	Party	Notes
1996	Toshinobu Awaya	New Frontier	
1996	Toshinobu Awaya	Sun	
1996	Toshinobu Awaya	Good Governance	
2000	Toshinobu Awaya	AoI	
2003	Daisuke Matsumoto	Democratic	
2005	Hiroshi Hiraguchi	LDP	
2009	Daisuke Matsumoto	Democratic	
2012	Hiroshi Hiraguchi	LDP	
2014	Hiroshi Hiraguchi	LDP	
2017	Hiroshi Hiraguchi	LDP	
2021	Hiroshi Hiraguchi	LDP	
2024	Hiroshi Hiraguchi	LDP	
2026	Hiroshi Hiraguchi	LDP	

== Election results ==
=== 2026 ===
2026
Party	Candidate	Votes	%	±%
LDP	Hiroshi Hiraguchi	94,750	51.70	
DPP	Gen Fukuda	53,893	29.41	
Sanseitō	Yukiko Sato	20,123	10.98	New
JCP	Hiromi Okada	14,510	7.92	
Majority		40,857	22.29	
Registered electors		384,853		
Turnout			49.12	▲0.52
LDP hold				

=== 2024 ===
2024
Party	Candidate	Votes	%	±%
LDP	Hiroshi Hiraguchi	82,443	44.97	
DPP	Gen Fukuda (Won PR seat)	61,679	33.65	New
Ishin	Masataka Kaneshiro	21,846	11.92	N/A
JCP	Hiromi Okada	17,354	9.47	N/A
Majority		20,764	11.32	
Registered electors		386,897		
Turnout			48.60	▼2.88
LDP hold				

=== 2021 ===
2021
Party	Candidate	Votes	%	±%
LDP	Hiroshi Hiraguchi	133,126	65.24	
CDP	Akai Ōi	70,939	34.76	New
Majority		62,187	30.48	
Registered electors		404,009		
Turnout			51.48	▲0.70
LDP hold				

=== 2017 ===
2017
Party	Candidate	Votes	%	±%
LDP	Hiroshi Hiraguchi	96,718	47.89	
Kibō no Tō	Daisuke Matsumoto	68,309	33.82	New
Ishin	Kana Haioka	18,128	8.98	New
JCP	Satoshi Fujimoto	16,393	8.12	
Happiness Realization	Yoshihiro Mizuno	2,403	1.19	N/A
Majority		28,409	14.07	
Registered electors		404,633		
Turnout			50.78	▼0.34
LDP hold				

=== 2014 ===
2014
Party	Candidate	Votes	%	±%
LDP	Hiroshi Hiraguchi	102,719	52.21	
Democratic	Daisuke Matsumoto	77,234	39.26	
JCP	Satoshi Fujimoto	16,794	8.54	
Majority		25,485	12.95	
Registered electors		393,696		
Turnout			51.12	▼6.23
LDP hold				

=== 2012 ===
2012
Party	Candidate	Votes	%	±%
LDP	Hiroshi Hiraguchi	109,823	49.74	
Democratic	Daisuke Matsumoto	61,373	27.80	
Restoration	Yasuhiro Tsuji	36,979	16.75	New
JCP	Tatsuichi Nakamori	12,619	5.72	N/A
Majority		48,450	21.94	
Registered electors		392,877		
Turnout			57.35	▼11.54
LDP gain from Democratic				

=== 2009 ===
2009
Party	Candidate	Votes	%	±%
Democratic	Daisuke Matsumoto	149,227	56.33	
LDP	Hiroshi Hiraguchi	110,238	41.61	
Happiness Realization	Kaori Miyauchi	5,458	2.06	New
Majority		38,989	14.72	
Registered electors		390,965		
Turnout			68.89	
Democratic gain from LDP				

=== 2005 ===
2005
Party	Candidate	Votes	%	±%
LDP	Hiroshi Hiraguchi	129,462	50.78	
Democratic	Daisuke Matsumoto (Won PR seat)	112,435	44.10	
JCP	Atsumi Takami	13,047	5.12	
Majority		17,027	6.68	
Registered electors				
Turnout				
LDP gain from Democratic				

=== 2003 ===
2003
Party	Candidate	Votes	%	±%
Democratic	Daisuke Matsumoto	81,382	37.47	New
Assembly of Independents	Hiroshi Hiraguchi	61,472	28.30	
LDP	Hitoshi Hinokida	48,557	22.36	
Independent	Shigeru Oki	16,052	7.39	New
JCP	Kazuo Ōkoshi	9,726	4.48	
Majority		19,910	9.17	
Registered electors				
Turnout				
Democratic gain from Assembly of Independents				

=== 2000 ===
2000
Party	Candidate	Votes	%	±%
Assembly of Independents	Toshinobu Awaya	92,316	43.95	New
LDP	Hitoshi Hinokida	80,198	38.18	
JCP	Satoshi Fujimoto	37,550	17.88	
Majority		12,118	5.77	
Registered electors				
Turnout				
Assembly of Independents hold				

=== 1996 ===
1996
Party	Candidate	Votes	%	±%
New Frontier	Toshinobu Awaya	67,876	34.71	New
LDP	Hitoshi Hinokida (Won PR seat)	60,968	31.18	New
Social Democratic	Tadatoshi Akiba (Won PR seat)	48,142	24.62	New
JCP	Teruko Makino	14,688	7.51	New
New Socialist	Masatoshi Ito	3,862	1.98	New
Majority		6,908	3.53	
Registered electors				
Turnout				
New Frontier win (new seat)				
