= Hiroshima 3rd district =

Japan House of Representatives constituency

- Parliamentary constituency for the Japanese House of Representatives
- Numbered map of the Hiroshima Prefecture single seats
- Prefecture: Hiroshima
- Proportional District: Chūgoku
- Electorate: 417,690

Current constituency
- Created: 1994
- Seats: One
- Party: LDP
- Representative: Rintaro Ishibashi
- Municipalities: Aki-ku, Asakita-ku and Asaminami-ku of Hiroshima, Akitakata, Yamagata District.

Hiroshima 3rd district (広島県第3区, Hiroshima-ken dai-sanku or simply 広島3区, Hiroshima-sanku) is a single-member constituency of the House of Representatives in the national Diet of Japan located in Hiroshima Prefecture.

== Areas covered ==
=== Since 2022 ===
- Part of Hiroshima
  - Aki-ku
  - Asakita-ku
  - Asaminami-ku
- Akitakata
- Yamagata District

=== 2013 - 2022 ===
- Part of Hiroshima
  - Asakita-ku
  - Asaminami-ku
- Akitakata
- Yamagata District

=== 1994 - 2013 ===
- Part of Hiroshima
  - Asakita-ku
  - Asaminami-ku
- Takata District
- Yamagata District

== List of representatives ==
Election	Representative	Party	Notes
1996	Katsuyuki Kawai	LDP	
2000	Yoshitake Masuhara	Independent	
2003	Yoshitake Masuhara	LDP	
2005	Katsuyuki Kawai	LDP	
2009	Hiroaki Hashimoto	Democratic	
2012	Katsuyuki Kawai	LDP	
2014	Katsuyuki Kawai	LDP	
2017	Katsuyuki Kawai	LDP	
2017	Katsuyuki Kawai	Independent	
2021	Tetsuo Saito	Komeito	
2024	Tetsuo Saito	Komeito	
2024	Tetsuo Saito	CRA	
2026	Rintaro Ishibashi	LDP	

== Election results ==
=== 2026 ===
2026
Party	Candidate	Votes	%	±%
LDP	Rintaro Ishibashi	100,352	51.36	N/A
Centrist Reform	Katsuya Azuma	57,975	29.67	
Sanseitō	Junko Tanaka	25,253	12.92	New
JCP	Fumiko Takamatsu	8,147	4.17	
Independent	Noritaka Tamada	3,656	1.87	
Majority		42,377	21.69	
Registered electors		413,881		
Turnout			48.06	▲1.72
LDP gain from Centrist Reform				

=== 2024 ===
2024
Party	Candidate	Votes	%	±%
Komeito	Tetsuo Saito	86,654	47.23	
CDP	Katsuya Azuma (Won PR seat)	71,952	39.21	
JCP	Atsumi Takami	14,128	7.70	N/A
Independent	Noritaka Tamada	10,751	5.86	
Majority		14,702	8.02	
Registered electors		417,051		
Turnout			46.34	▼4.67
Komeito hold				

=== 2021 ===
2021
Party	Candidate	Votes	%	±%
Komeito	Tetsuo Saito	97,844	55.07	New
CDP	Mayumi Ryan	53,143	29.91	New
Ishin	Hirochika Segi	18,088	10.18	
Independent	Hiroshi Ōyama	3,559	2.00	New
Anti-NHK	Shuhei Yajima	2,789	1.57	New
Independent	Noritaka Tamada	2,251	1.27	
Majority		44,701	25.16	
Registered electors		360,198		
Turnout			51.07	▲1.14
Komeito gain from Independent				

=== 2017 ===
2017
Party	Candidate	Votes	%	±%
LDP	Katsuyuki Kawai	82,998	47.37	
Independent	Ayaka Shiomura	61,976	35.37	New
Ishin	Jin Imaeda	23,779	13.57	New
Happiness Realization	Masateru Nomura	2,720	1.55	N/A
Independent	Noritaka Tamada	1,978	1.13	New
Independent	Akihiko Nishimoto	1,753	1.00	New
Majority		21,022	12.00	
Registered electors		362,243		
Turnout			49.93	▲0.48
LDP hold				

=== 2014 ===
2014
Party	Candidate	Votes	%	±%
LDP	Katsuyuki Kawai	85,311	50.67	
Democratic	Hiroaki Hashimoto	66,549	39.52	
JCP	Teiko Shimizu	16,514	9.81	
Majority		18,762	11.15	
Registered electors		353,319		
Turnout			49.45	▼6.29
LDP hold				

=== 2012 ===
2012
Party	Candidate	Votes	%	±%
LDP	Katsuyuki Kawai	87,993	46.18	
Democratic	Hiroaki Hashimoto	51,666	27.12	
Restoration	Hiromu Nakamaru (Won PR seat)	36,993	19.42	New
JCP	Toshiko Fujii	13,875	7.28	
Majority		36,327	19.06	
Registered electors		352,969		
Turnout			55.74	▼12.85
LDP gain from Democratic				

=== 2009 ===
2009
Party	Candidate	Votes	%	±%
Democratic	Hiroaki Hashimoto	133,994	56.81	
LDP	Yoshitake Masuhara	96,065	40.73	
Happiness Realization	Junko Hidaka	5,825	2.47	New
Majority		37,929	16.08	
Registered electors		350,705		
Turnout			68.59	
Democratic gain from LDP				

=== 2005 ===
2005
Party	Candidate	Votes	%	±%
LDP	Katsuyuki Kawai	94,017	42.09	
Democratic	Hiroaki Hashimoto	59,576	26.67	New
Independent	Ryozo Ishibashi	31,792	14.23	New
Social Democratic	Tetsuo Kaneko	26,269	11.76	
JCP	Osamu Onishi	9,892	4.43	
Independent	Junko Futami	1,824	0.82	New
Majority		34,441	15.42	
Registered electors				
Turnout				
LDP hold				

=== 2003 ===
2003
Party	Candidate	Votes	%	±%
LDP	Yoshitake Masuhara	106,972	60.21	
Social Democratic	Tetsuo Kaneko	53,382	30.05	
JCP	Osamu Onishi	17,318	9.75	
Majority		53,590	30.16	
Registered electors				
Turnout				
LDP hold				

=== 2000 ===
2000
Party	Candidate	Votes	%	±%
Independent	Yoshitake Masuhara	82,012	41.17	New
LDP	Katsuyuki Kawai	65,805	33.04	
Social Democratic	Tetsuo Kaneko (Won PR seat)	36,478	18.31	
JCP	Kazuko Ōue	14,896	7.48	
Majority		16,207	8.13	
Registered electors				
Turnout				
Independent gain from LDP				

=== 1996 ===
1996
Party	Candidate	Votes	%	±%
LDP	Katsuyuki Kawai	65,928	38.30	New
New Frontier	Yoshitake Masuhara	57,516	33.41	New
New Socialist	Keiso Tsujikoma	18,714	10.87	New
Social Democratic	Haruko Katayama	16,476	9.57	New
JCP	Tominori Tanaka	13,506	7.85	New
Majority		8,412	4.89	
Registered electors				
Turnout				
LDP win (new seat)				
