= Toshinao Nakagawa =

Japanese politician

- 中川 俊直
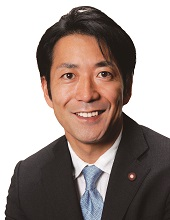
- Official portrait, 2016

Member of the House of Representatives
- In office 16 December 2012 – 28 September 2017
- Preceded by: Seiki Soramoto
- Succeeded by: Masayoshi Shintani
- Constituency: Hiroshima 4th

Personal details
- Born: 25 April 1970 (age 56) Higashihiroshima, Hiroshima, Japan
- Party: Independent
- Other political affiliations: LDP (2012–2017)
- Children: 3
- Parent: Hidenao Nakagawa (father)
- Education: Nihon University; Waseda University

Toshinao Nakagawa (中川 俊直, Nakagawa Toshinao) is a former Japanese politician of the Liberal Democratic Party. The scion of an elite political family, Nakagawa resigned in April 2017 following reports of an extramarital affair.

== Early career ==
Nakagawa had previously worked as a journalist for TV Tokyo and as a secretary for his father, Hidenao Nakagawa.

== Political career ==
Nakagawa represented a constituency in Hiroshima (Hiroshima No. 4). Nakagawa was parliamentary Vice Minister of the Economy, Trade and Industry. He was replaced by Masaki Ogushi following his resignation.

On December 26, 2025, it was reported that Nakagawa agreed to join Sanseito.

=== Affair and resignation ===
Nakagawa resigned following allegations printed in the Shukan Shincho that he had a mistress, who in turn broke up with him when she learned that he was in a relationship with another Liberal Democratic Party lawmaker, Megumi Maekawa. One of his affairs reportedly culminated in a fake wedding ceremony in Hawaii. He submitted a notice of resignation from the LDP on April 21, and apologized for his conduct in a Facebook post.

Around July 13, Nakagawa announced that he was hosting a fundraiser entitled "Toshinao Nakagawa’s Apology and Comeback Event", with the aim of relaunching his political career.
