= Hidenao Nakagawa =

Japanese politician

Hideo Nakagawa
- 中川 秀直
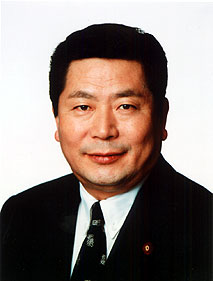
- Official portrait, 2000

Chief Cabinet Secretary Director-General of the Okinawa Development Agency
- In office 4 July 2000 – 27 October 2000
- Prime Minister: Yoshirō Mori
- Preceded by: Mikio Aoki
- Succeeded by: Yasuo Fukuda

Director-General of the Science and Technology Agency Chairman of the Japanese Atomic Energy Commission
- In office 11 January 1996 – 7 November 1996
- Prime Minister: Ryutaro Hashimoto
- Preceded by: Yasuoki Urano
- Succeeded by: Riichiro Chikaoka

Member of the House of Representatives
- In office 19 July 1993 – 16 December 2012
- Preceded by: Hiroyuki Masuoka
- Succeeded by: Multi-member district
- Constituency: Hiroshima 2nd (1993–1996); Hiroshima 4th (1996–2009); Chūgoku PR (2009–2012)
- In office 23 June 1980 – 24 January 1990
- Preceded by: Hiroyuki Masuoka
- Succeeded by: Chūryō Morii
- Constituency: Hiroshima 2nd
- In office 10 December 1976 – 7 September 1979
- Preceded by: Kazuo Tanikawa
- Succeeded by: Kazuo Tanikawa
- Constituency: Hiroshima 2nd

Personal details
- Born: 2 February 1944 (age 82) Tokyo, Japan
- Party: Liberal Democratic
- Other political affiliations: New Liberal Club
- Children: Toshinao Nakagawa
- Relatives: Shunji Nagakawa (father-in-law)
- Education: Keio University

Hidenao Nakagawa (中川 秀直, Nakagawa Hidenao; born 2 February 1944) is a former Japanese politician of the Liberal Democratic Party, who served as a member of the House of Representatives of the Diet (parliament).

== Political career ==
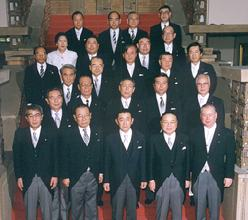
Nakagawa with members of First Hashimoto Cabinet (at the Prime Minister's Official Residence on 11 January 1996)

He served Yoshirō Mori as Chief Cabinet Secretary from July 2000 to October 2000. In 2006 he was appointed secretary-general of the party.

His son, Toshinao Nakagawa, would later serve as a Representative and Vice Minister of the Economy, Trade and Industry.

== Political funding controversies ==
The Japanese Communist Party's newspaper, Akahata, reported that Nakagawa received political donations from the National Political Federation of Moneylenders (Zenseiren), a political organization representing the moneylending industry, including consumer finance companies.

Some media outlets have reported that he received donations from businessman Tadao Mitsui.

== Publications ==
Japan in the Global Age: A Patriotic Theory of Humanity and Nationhood in 2001 (Waseda Shobo, July 21, 1983)

Japan in the New Global Age: 17 Turbulent Months as Vice Minister of International Trade and Industry and Recommendations for Japan in the 21st Century (Future Economy Research Group, December 1, 1987)

== See also ==
- Seiwa Seisaku Kenkyūkai

House of Representatives (Japan)
Preceded by Kenichiro Ohtsubo	Chair, Lower House Committee on Science and Technology; 1988–1989	Succeeded by Hiroshi Kitaguchi
Preceded by Yoshiyuki Kamei	Chair, Lower House Committee on Rules and Administration; 1998–1999	Succeeded by Tadamori Oshima
Political offices
Preceded by Yasuoki Urano	Director of the Science and Technology Agency; 1996	Succeeded by Riichiro Chikaoka
Preceded by Yasuoki Urano	Chair, Atomic Energy Commission; 1996	Succeeded by Riichiro Chikaoka
Preceded by Mikio Aoki	Chief Cabinet Secretary; 2000	Succeeded by Yasuo Fukuda
Preceded by Mikio Aoki	Director of the Okinawa Development Agency; 2000	Succeeded by Yasuo Fukuda
Party political offices
Preceded by Tadamori Oshima	Chair, Diet Affairs Committee of the Liberal Democratic Party; 2002–2005	Succeeded by Hiroyuki Hosoda
Preceded by Kaoru Yosano	Chair, Policy Research Council of the Liberal Democratic Party; 2005–2006	Succeeded by Shōichi Nakagawa
Preceded by Tsutomu Takebe	Secretary-General of the Liberal Democratic Party; 2006–2007	Succeeded by Tarō Asō
