= Hiroshi Hiraguchi =

Japanese politician

- 平口 洋
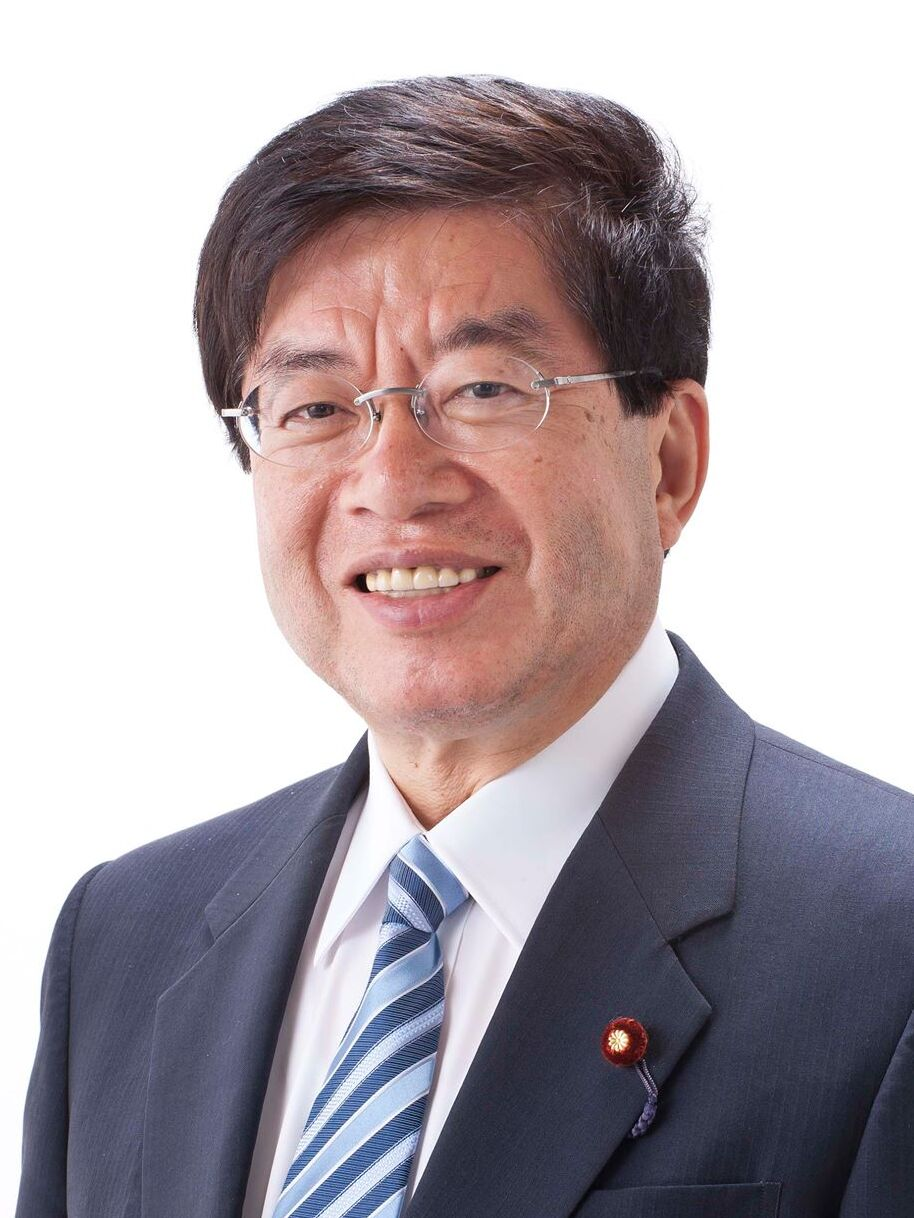
- Official portrait, 2018

Minister of Justice
- In office 21 October 2025 – 17 September 2026
- Prime Minister: Sanae Takaichi
- Preceded by: Keisuke Suzuki
- Succeeded by: Takashi Yamashita

Member of the House of Representatives
- Incumbent
- Assumed office 16 December 2012
- Preceded by: Daisuke Matsumoto
- Constituency: Hiroshima 2nd
- In office 11 September 2005 – 21 July 2009
- Preceded by: Daisuke Matsumoto
- Succeeded by: Daisuke Matsumoto
- Constituency: Hiroshima 2nd

Personal details
- Born: 1 August 1948 (age 78) Etajima, Hiroshima, Japan
- Party: Liberal Democratic
- Education: University of Tokyo

Hiroshi Hiraguchi (平口 洋, Hiraguchi Hiroshi; born 1 August 1948) is a Japanese politician who has served as Minister of Justice since October 2025. A member of the Liberal Democratic Party (LDP), he serves as a member of the House of Representatives from 2005 to 2009 and since 2012.

A native of Hiroshima Prefecture and graduate of the University of Tokyo, he was an official in the Ministry of Construction before becoming a politician.

== Biography ==
Hiraguchi was born in Etajima, Hiroshima on 1 August 1948. He attended Hiroshima Academy Junior and Senior High School, a Jesuit boys' school in Hiroshima City, before going on to study law at the University of Tokyo. He first aspired to become a judge, but after graduation in 1972, he joined the Ministry of Construction. He attended the University of Pennsylvania in the United States as a ministry official.

Leaving the ministry in 2001, he ran unsuccessfully for the House of Representatives as an independent in 2003. He ran again in 2005 as a member of the LDP and was elected for the first time. He has represented the 2nd District of Hiroshima prefecture from 2005 to 2009, and again from 2012 to the present. He has served as parliamentary vice minister of Justice, senior vice minister of the Environment and senior vice minister of Justice.

Hiraguchi was appointed Minister of Justice in the First Takaichi cabinet.
