= Yoshitake Masuhara =

Japanese politician (born 1945)

- 増原 義剛
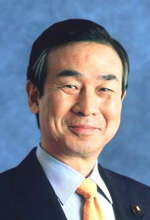
- Official portrait, 2008

Member of the House of Representatives
- In office 25 June 2000 – 21 July 2009
- Preceded by: Katsuyuki Kawai
- Succeeded by: Multi-member district
- Constituency: Hiroshima 3rd (2000–2005); Chūgoku PR (2005–2009)

Personal details
- Born: 1 June 1945 (age 81) Hiroshima, Japan
- Party: Liberal Democratic
- Other political affiliations: NFP (1996–1998); Independent (1998–2003)
- Education: University of Tokyo

Yoshitake Masuhara (増原 義剛, Masuhara Yoshitake; born 1 June 1945) is a retired Japanese politician of the Liberal Democratic Party, who served as a member of the House of Representatives in the Diet (national legislature). A native of Hiroshima, Hiroshima and graduate of the University of Tokyo, he worked at the Ministry of Finance from 1969 to 1995. He was elected to the House of Representatives for the first time in 2000 as an independent. Later, he became an independent and then joined the LDP.
