= Rintaro Ishibashi =

Japanese politician (born 1980)

- 石橋 林太郎
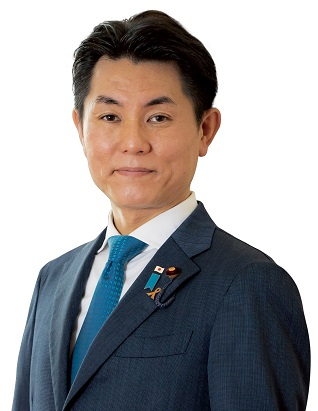
- Official portrait, 2023

Member of the House of Representatives
- Incumbent
- Assumed office 3 November 2021
- Preceded by: Tetsuo Saito
- Constituency: Chūgoku PR (2021–2026); Hiroshima 3rd (2026–present)

Member of the Hiroshima Prefectural Assembly
- In office May 2015 – 6 July 2021
- Constituency: Asaminami Ward, Hiroshima City

Personal details
- Born: 2 May 1978 (age 48) Asaminami, Hiroshima, Japan
- Party: Liberal Democratic
- Education: Osaka University of Foreign Studies

Rintaro Ishibashi (石橋林太郎, Ishibashi Rintaro; born 2 May 1978) is a Japanese politician serving as a member of the House of Representatives since 2021. From 2015 to 2021, he was a member of the Hiroshima Prefectural Assembly.
