= Takashi Yamashita =

Japanese politician

- 山下 貴司
- Official portrait, 2026

Minister of Justice
- Incumbent
- Assumed office 17 September 2026
- Prime Minister: Sanae Takaichi
- Preceded by: Hiroshi Hiraguchi
- In office 2 October 2018 – 11 September 2019
- Prime Minister: Shinzo Abe
- Preceded by: Yōko Kamikawa
- Succeeded by: Katsuyuki Kawai

Member of the House of Representatives
- Incumbent
- Assumed office 16 December 2012
- Preceded by: Keisuke Tsumura
- Constituency: Okayama 2nd

Personal details
- Born: 8 September 1965 (age 61) Okayama, Japan
- Party: Liberal Democratic
- Education: University of Tokyo; Columbia Law School

Takashi Yamashita (山下 貴司, Yamashita Takashi; born 8 September 1965) is a Japanese prosecutor and politician who has served in the House of Representatives since 2012. He was Minister of Justice from 2018 to 2019.

== Early life and prosecutorial career ==
Yamashita was born in Takamatsu and grew up in Okayama. After graduating from the University of Tokyo, he became a prosecutor, and served in several assignments, including as Legal Attaché to the Embassy of Japan in the United States of America. He attended Columbia Law School on a Fulbright scholarship in 1997.

Yamashita left government service in 2010 after serving in an international director role in the Ministry of Justice.

== Political career ==
Yamashita was elected in the 2012 Japanese general election to represent the Okayama 2nd district, defeating DPJ incumbent Keisuke Tsumura. He held his seat against Tsumura in the 2014 election and the 2017 election.

Yamashita served as Parliamentary Vice Minister of Justice before being appointed Minister of Justice on October 2, 2018. Prime Minister Shinzo Abe chose Yamashita as a conciliatory gesture to intra-party rival Shigeru Ishiba, who Yamashita supported.

Opposition parties submitted a no confidence motion against Yamashita in November 2018, alleging that he did not properly explain an immigration bill that would admit more foreign workers to Japan.

Nissan chairman Carlos Ghosn was arrested and jailed during Yamashita's tenure as Justice Minister. During the affair, Yamashita defended the Japanese criminal justice system against international criticism.

After Yamashita stepped down as Minister of Justice in September 2019, he was appointed as chief secretary of the LDP's internal body on revising the constitution, led by Hiroyuki Hosoda.

Political offices
Preceded by Yōko Kamikawa	Minister of Justice; 2018–2019	Succeeded by Katsuyuki Kawai
