= Ichiro Aisawa =

Japanese politician

- 逢沢 一郎
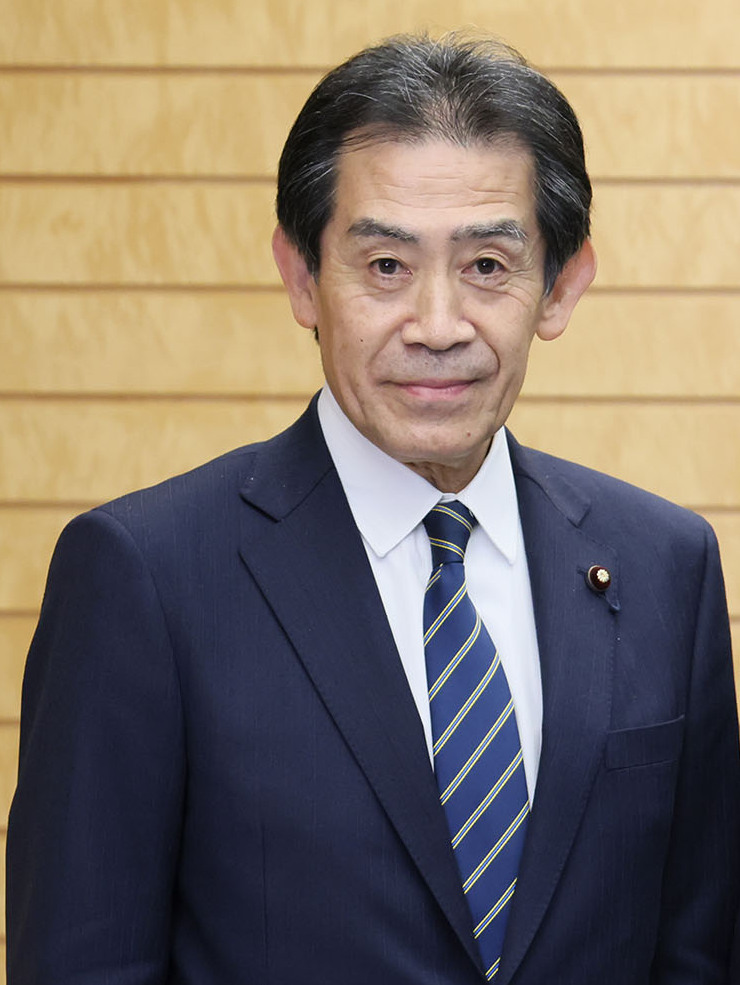
- Aisawa in 2023

Member of the House of Representatives
- Incumbent
- Assumed office 6 July 1986
- Preceded by: Yūsaku Yayama
- Constituency: Former Okayama 1st (1986–1996); Okayama 1st (1996–present)

Personal details
- Born: 10 June 1954 (age 72) Mitsu, Okayama, Japan
- Party: Liberal Democratic
- Education: Keio University

Ichiro Aisawa (逢沢 一郎, Aisawa Ichirō; born 10 June 1954) is a Japanese politician of the Liberal Democratic Party, who serves as a member of the House of Representatives in the Diet (national legislature). A native of Mitsu District, Okayama and graduate of Keio University, he was elected to the House of Representatives for the first time in 1986.

In 2003, he was appointed as Senior Vice-Minister for the Ministry of Foreign Affairs.

He was appointed as Chairmen of several Standing Committees of House of Representatives; Committee on Foreign Affairs in 1997, Committee on Rules and Administration in 2006, Committee on Budget in 2007 and Committee on Fundamental National Policies in 2014.

He serves as Vice-President of the Japan Scout Parliamentary Association.

In 2022, it was revealed that Aisawa had attended events affiliated with the Unification Church and received campaign support from members.

Previously his father Hideo Aisawa (1926–2016) and grandfather Ken Aizawa (1888–1982, first elected in 1942) had also represented Okayama in the Diet.
