= Hiroshima Prefectural Assembly =

Parliament of Hiroshima, Japan

The Hiroshima Prefectural Assembly (広島県議会, Hiroshima-ken Gikai) is the prefectural parliament of Hiroshima Prefecture.

== Members ==
As of 4 October 2019:

Constituency	Members	Party
Hiroshima City, Naka Ward	Daizō Hayashi	LDP
Hiroshima City, Naka Ward	Mika Kusaka	Komeito
Hiroshima City, Naka Ward	Icchoku Satō	Kōshikai
Hiroshima City, Higashi Ward	Kenji Hataishi	LDP
Hiroshima City, Higashi Ward	Tadanori Kakimoto	Minshu Kenseikai
Hiroshima City, Higashi Ward	Naoyuki Ogata	LDP
Hiroshima City, Minami Ward	Yasuhisa Kubota	LDP
Hiroshima City, Minami Ward	Kōji Nakahara	Minshu Kenseikai
Hiroshima City, Minami Ward	Takashi Nakamoto	LDP
Hiroshima City, Nishi Ward	Motohiro Fukuchi	Minshu Kenseikai
Hiroshima City, Nishi Ward	Katsunori Sunahara	Kōshikai
Hiroshima City, Nishi Ward	Juichi Tagawa	Komeito
Hiroshima City, Nishi Ward	Shigeru Yamaki	LDP
Hiroshima City, Asaminami Ward	Rintarō Ishibashi	LDP
Hiroshima City, Asaminami Ward	Shunji Kurihara	Komeito
Hiroshima City, Asaminami Ward	Yasuharu Maeda	Jimingiren
Hiroshima City, Asaminami Ward	Jun Takahiro	Minshu Kenseikai
Hiroshima City, Asaminami Ward	Tetsu Takehara	Jimingiren
Hiroshima City, Asakita Ward	Yasuyuki Higashi	Minshu Kenseikai
Hiroshima City, Asakita Ward	Noriko Watanabe	Kōshikai
Hiroshima City, Asakita Ward	Masahiro Yamasaki	Jimingiren
Hiroshima City, Aki Ward	Toshihiro Hiyama	Jiminkai
Hiroshima City, Aki Ward	Katsunori Nishimura	Minshu Kenseikai
Hiroshima City, Saeki Ward	Yasunori Miyazaki	Jimingiren
Hiroshima City, Saeki Ward	Minoru Takimoto	Minshu Kenseikai
Hiroshima City, Saeki Ward	Kenzō Tominaga	Jimingiren
Kure City	Hidenori Inudō	Minshu Kenseikai
Kure City	Tsunehiro Kido	Kōshikai
Kure City	Nobuya Okuhara	Jimingiren
Kure City	Yukio Shitanishi	Komeito
Kure City	Tatsuhiro Tsubokawa	Jimintaishikai
Takehara City and Toyota District	Ietada Morikawa	Jimingiren
Mihara City and Sera District	Eiji Hiramoto	Jimingiren
Mihara City and Sera District	Eiji Itō	Jimingiren
Mihara City and Sera District	Yoshinori Kuwaki	Minshu Kenseikai
Onomichi City	Iwao Kanakuchi	Minshu Kenseikai
Onomichi City	Hirokuni Takayama	Jimingiren
Onomichi City	Kiyosuke Yoshii	Jimingiren
Fukuyama City	Masanao Idehara	Jimingiren
Fukuyama City	Kiyoshi Inaba	Minshu Kenseikai
Fukuyama City	Masahiro Ishizu	Komeito
Fukuyama City	Yutaka Matoba	Minshu Kenseikai
Fukuyama City	Hiromichi Matsuoka	Jimingiren
Fukuyama City	Ryōji Miyoshi	Jimingiren
Fukuyama City	Eiji Murakami	Hiroshima Reiwa
Fukuyama City	Ryōichi Oguma	Komeito
Fukuyama City	Tsuneo Tsuji	Japanese Communist Party
Fukuyama City	Shin Uda	Jimingiren
Fuchū City and Jinseki District	Tetsuo Okazaki	Jimingiren
Miyoshi City	Hiroaki Shimomori	Jimingiren
Shōbara City	Hidenori Kobayashi	Jimingiren
Ōtake City	Hiroshi Sematō	Jimingiren
Higashihiroshima City	Keiji Ebisu	Jimingiren
Higashihiroshima City	Osamu Ihara	Kōshikai
Higashihiroshima City	Hiroyuki Nishimoto	Minshu Kenseikai
Higashihiroshima City	Yasumitsu Shimohara	LDP
Hatsukaichi City	Satoshi Yamashita	LDP
Hatsukaichi City	Hironori Yasui	LDP
Akitakata City	Hiroshi Kodama	LDP
Etajima City	Jun Okii	LDP
Aki District	Tōru Hiramoto	Kōshikai
Aki District	Mayumi Itō	LDP
Aki District	Minoru Takata	Minshu Kenseikai
Yamagata District	Shinpachi Miyamoto	Kōshikai
