= Yasuhiro Takami =

Japanese politician (born 1980)

- 高見 康裕
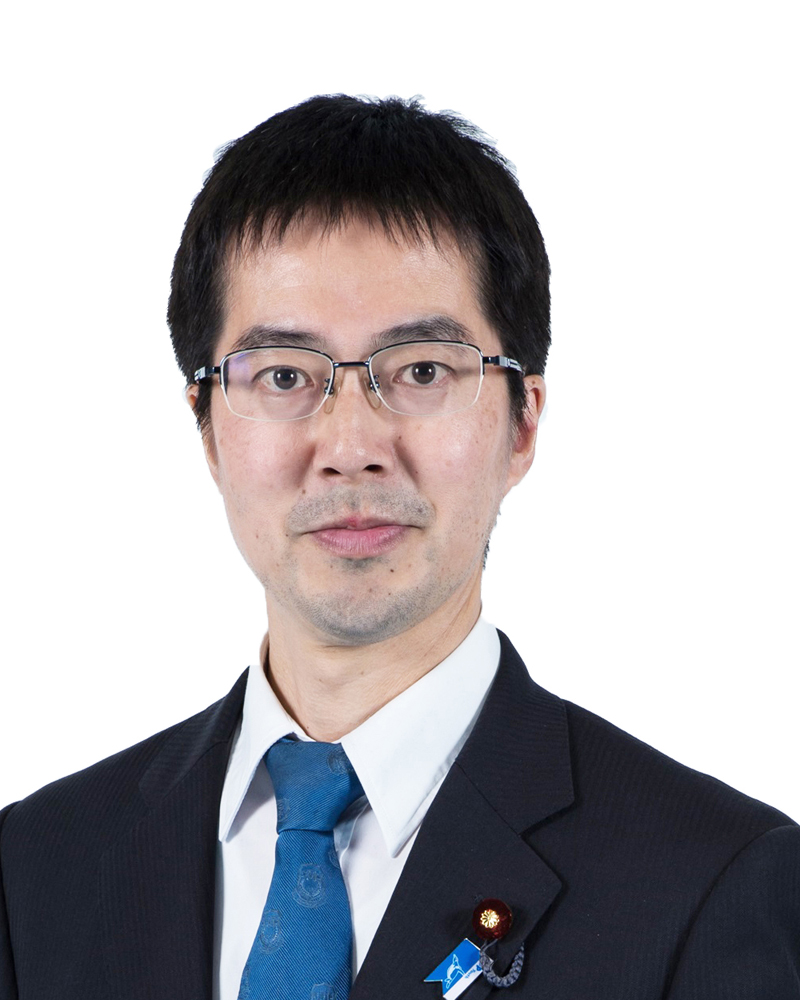
- Official portrait, 2024

Member of the House of Representatives
- Incumbent
- Assumed office 3 November 2021
- Preceded by: Wataru Takeshita
- Constituency: Shimane 2nd

Member of the Shimane Prefectural Assembly
- In office 2015–2021
- Constituency: Izumo City

Personal details
- Born: 16 October 1980 (age 45) Hirata, Shimane, Japan
- Party: Liberal Democratic
- Children: 2
- Education: University of Tokyo

Yasuhiro Takami (高見康裕, Takami Yasuhiro; born 16 October 1980) is a Japanese politician serving as a member of the House of Representatives since 2021. From 2015 to 2021, he was a member of the Shimane Prefectural Assembly.
