= Masayoshi Shintani =

Japanese politician

- 新谷 正義
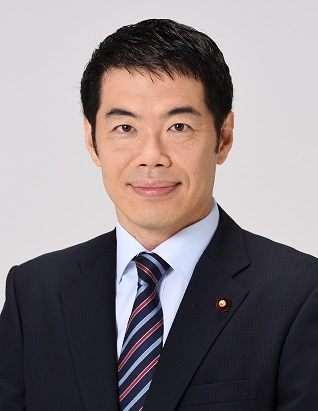
- Official portrait, 2019

Member of the House of Representatives
- Incumbent
- Assumed office 21 December 2012
- Preceded by: Multi-member district
- Constituency: Northern Kanto PR (2012–2014); Chūgoku PR (2014–2017); Hiroshima 4th (2017–2024); Chūgoku PR (2024–2026); Hiroshima 4th (2026–present)

Personal details
- Born: 8 March 1975 (age 51) Higashihiroshima, Hiroshima, Japan
- Party: Liberal Democratic
- Education: School of Medicine, Teikyo University; Faculty of Economics, University of Tokyo
- Occupation: Doctor

Masayoshi Shintani is a Japanese politician who is a member of the House of Representatives of Japan.

He was a medical doctor before he was elected in 2012, 2014, 2017, and 2021.
