= 2025 Miyagi gubernatorial election =

Election for the Governor of Miyagi

- 26 October 2025
- Turnout: 46.50% (▼9.79 pp)
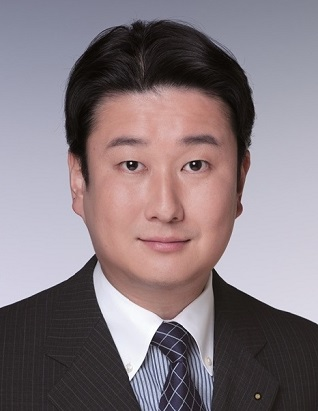
Candidate	Yoshihiro Murai	Masamune Wada	Miyuki Yusa
Party	Independent	Independent	Independent
Popular vote	340,190	324,375	176,287
Percentage	39.3%	37.5%	20.4%
Supported by	LDP, Komeito, Ishin	Sanseito, LDP	CDP, JCP
- Election results by municipalities.
Governor before election
Yoshihiro Murai
Independent
Elected Governor
Yoshihiro Murai
Independent

The 2025 Miyagi gubernatorial election was held on 26 October, 2025, to elect the Governor of Miyagi. Incumbent Yoshihiro Murai was elected to a record sixth term for the Prefecture, albeit by an extremely reduced margin. He defeated Masamune Wada, who was backed by Sanseito and factions of the LDP. Also running was Miyuki Yusa, a former prefectural assembly member backed by local branches of the CDP and the JCP, and two minor candidates, Jun Kanayama and Shuto Ito.

It is considered the first time Sanseito had waded into a local gubernatorial election. The race escalated heavily with Wada's entrance to the field. Main issues included voter fatigue with Murai, Murai's fact checking of fake news on social media, reorganization of local Sendai hospitals, increasing polarization in Japan, and the privatization of Miyagi's waterworks, which led Wada and Sohei Kamiya to describe Murai as a "representative of globalism". Social media disinformation was also rampant, with posts frequently describing that Murai would flood Miyagi with foreigners.

== Background ==
Murai was first elected Governor of Miyagi in 2005, after serving as a prefectural assembly member from 1995. Murai was elected with little opposition for five terms from 2005 to 2025, and rebuilt the prefecture following the 2011 Tōhoku earthquake and tsunami. He also served as President of the National Governor's Association from 2023 to 2025.

Murai began to take heat from conservative circles in 2025, particularly with his defense of multiculturalism, and his want to build an Islamic burial ground in Miyagi. Although the plan was eventually scrapped, the political resistance it faced damaged him heavily. Additionally, the water privatization plan the prefecture had passed faced resistance from far-right groupings, particularly Sanseito, who described the plan as selling out Miyagi to foreigners.

Conservative pressure on Murai eventually led to the entry of former LDP House of Councillors member Masamune Wada, who had just lost re-election. Wada stated he would review the water privatization scheme and focus on supporting childbirths. Eleven days later, Miyuki Yusa, who had left the local CDP to run for the office, entered the race. She cited a focus on economic policy, particularly disputing how Murai would keep livelihood support continuing through inflation.

== Campaign ==
The campaign eventually attracted nationwide focus, particularly after Wada and Sanseito signed a policy agreement. The policy agreement reached focused heavily on restricting multiculturalism, reversing immigration promotion policy, and canceling green and solar energy projects launched in the area.

Sanseito eventually gave what was described as "full support" to Wada, with representatives from the party, particularly leader Sohei Kamiya and deputy leader Rina Yoshikawa frequently giving street speeches focusing on "defeating globalism" and "multiculturalism". The move was described as an attempt by Sanseito to gain control of a local foothold for the party. Akie Abe, the widow of Shinzo Abe, endorsed Wada, as did some notable far-right LDP members such as Mio Sugita.

Wada and Murai were eventually described as being in a "dead heat". Wada attracted high numbers of support from Sansei and conservative LDP members, while Murai held onto a majority of LDP and Komeito voters. Murai also gained endorsements from Sendai mayor Kazuko Kōri and, eventually, Prime Minister Sanae Takaichi, who touted Murai's accomplishments in rebuilding after the 2011 Tohoku earthquake. Yusa, who was noted as trailing, nevertheless secured the support of most of the local CDP and JCP members, and campaigned on improving local healthcare and free school meals.

== Results ==
An NHK exit poll came out as polls closed at 20:00. It showed Wada narrowly in the lead, with Murai closely following, while Yusa was running a distant third. Party breakdowns noted that Murai had secured high numbers of voters from both the LDP and Komeito, while Wada gained massive support from Sanseito - with nearly 90% voting in his favor - along with a majority in DPP members. Yusa won majorities of both CDP and JCP members. The polarization in age also became extremely clear, with Wada winning large margins of voters below forty while Murai dominated older voters.

Despite the exit poll, however, Murai dominated in rural polling stations, which built a lead over Wada that he ultimately failed to overcome despite good results out of Sendai itself. Murai was confirmed as the winner late into the night.

Margins

Miyagi gubernatorial election by ward
Municipalities	Yoshihiro Murai		Masamuse Wada		Miyuki Yusa		Jun Kanayama		Shuto Ito	
Municipalities	Votes	%	Votes	%	Votes	%	Votes	%	Votes	%
Total	340,190	39.33%	324,375	37.50%	176,287	20.38%	20,445	2.36%	3,663	0.42%
Aoba-Sendai	36,195	31.74%	47,386	41.56%	27,635	24.24%	2,413	2.12%	392	0.34%
Miyagino-Sendai	24,116	36.52%	28.071	42.50%	12,113	18.34%	1,432	2.17%	310	0.47%
Wakabayashi-Sendai	16,910	33.54%	22,158	43.95%	9,935	19.71%	1,180	2.34%	232	0.46%
Taihaku-Sendai	26,728	30.82%	37,899	43.70%	19,758	22.78%	1,969	2.27%	376	0.43%
Izumi-Sendai	28,589	35.03%	33,156	40.63%	17,959	22.01%	1,613	1.98%	288	0.35%
Ishinomaki	20,566	43.94%	16,099	34.39%	9,144	19.54%	793	1.69%	206	0.44%
Shiogama	8,019	40.10%	7,166	35.84%	4,314	21.57%	383	1.92%	114	0.57%
Kesennuma	10,756	47.68%	7,317	32.44%	3,872	17.17%	487	2.16%	124	0.55%
Shiroishi	5,986	44.99%	4,383	32.94%	2,421	18.20%	469	3.52%	47	0.35%
Natori	13,010	42.63%	11,417	37.41%	5,200	17.04%	767	2.51%	122	0.40%
Kakuda	4,384	39.58%	3,364	30.37%	1,811	16.35%	1,448	13.07%	70	0.63%
Tagajō	9,804	41.10%	8,887	37.25%	4,436	18.60%	559	2.34%	169	0.71%
Iwanuma	6,635	40.50%	6,193	37.80%	3,029	18.49%	469	2.86%	56	0.34%
Tome	13,420	47.16%	9,058	31.83%	5,354	18.81%	492	1.73%	134	0.47%
Kurihara	13,413	47.88%	7,864	28.07%	6,124	21.86%	516	1.84%	97	0.35%
Higashimatsushima	6,646	46.29%	4,742	33.03%	2,588	18.03%	307	2.14%	73	0.51%
Ōsaki	19,694	41.06%	15,535	32.39%	11,671	24.34%	908	1.89%	151	0.32%
Tomiya	10,957	48.85%	7,799	34.77%	3,197	14.25%	412	1.84%	67	0.30%
Zaō	2,616	52.51%	1,408	28.26%	805	16.16%	132	2.65%	21	0.42%
Shichikashuku	390	58.47%	169	25.34%	87	13.04%	20	3.00%	1	0.15%
Ōgawara	4,096	43.87%	3,101	33.21%	1,806	19.34%	293	3.14%	41	0.44%
Murata	2,127	47.51%	1,346	30.06%	862	19.25%	127	2.84%	15	0.34%
Shibata	5,861	41.97%	4,997	35.78%	2,514	18.00%	532	3.81%	61	0.44%
Kawasaki	1,794	48.37%	1,257	33.89%	593	15.99%	53	1.43%	12	0.32%
Marumori	2,237	42.78%	1,455	27.83%	809	15.47%	710	13.58%	18	0.34%
Watari	5,694	42.81%	4,869	36.60%	2,307	17.34%	369	2.77%	63	0.47%
Yamamoto	2,507	49.63%	1,521	30.11%	852	16.87%	145	2.87%	26	0.51%
Matsushima	2,574	45.42%	1,768	31.20%	1,193	21.05%	110	1.94%	22	0.39%
Shichigahama	3,056	43.80%	2,541	36.42%	1,209	17.33%	128	1.83%	43	0.62%
Rifu	6,025	41.16%	5,453	37.25%	2,819	19.26%	265	1.81%	75	0.51%
Taiwa	4,910	45.49%	3,940	36.51%	1,666	15.44%	219	2.03%	58	0.54%
Ōsato	1,697	53.18%	859	26.92%	577	18.08%	50	1.57%	8	0.25%
Ōhira	1,347	57.42%	626	26.68%	318	13.55%	45	1.92%	10	0.43%
Shikama	1,459	50.38%	789	27.24%	598	20.65%	42	1.45%	8	0.28%
Kami	4,071	44.74%	2,845	31.26%	1,957	21.51%	178	1.96%	49	0.54%
Wakuya	3,014	51.13%	1,646	27.92%	1,103	18.71%	111	1.88%	21	0.36%
Misato	4,180	43.46%	2,960	30.78%	2,286	23.77%	155	1.61%	37	0.38%
Onagawa	1,384	55.60%	615	24.71%	445	17.88%	29	1.17%	16	0.64%
Minamisanriku	3,312	54.36%	1,716	28.16%	920	15.10%	115	1.89%	30	0.49%

== Aftermath ==
Murai celebrated the victory, describing the election as unprecedented for him and called it a referendum on his past work in Miyagi. He stated his thanks to his supporters, and stated he would continue the implementation of his policy.

Wada apologized for being unable to win. Kamiya described the result as a partial victory, describing "Sendai's rejection of neoliberal policies", but stated his unhappiness at not reaching rural audiences, proclaiming the party's strategy will adjust before the next election.

It was eventually confirmed that the Miyagi LDP would consider disciplinary action against Wada for refusing to voluntarily leave the party while running in the election. He formally left the LDP on November 20th.

== See also ==
- 2025 Japanese gubernatorial elections
