= Sen Yamanaka =

Japanese politician

- 山中 泉
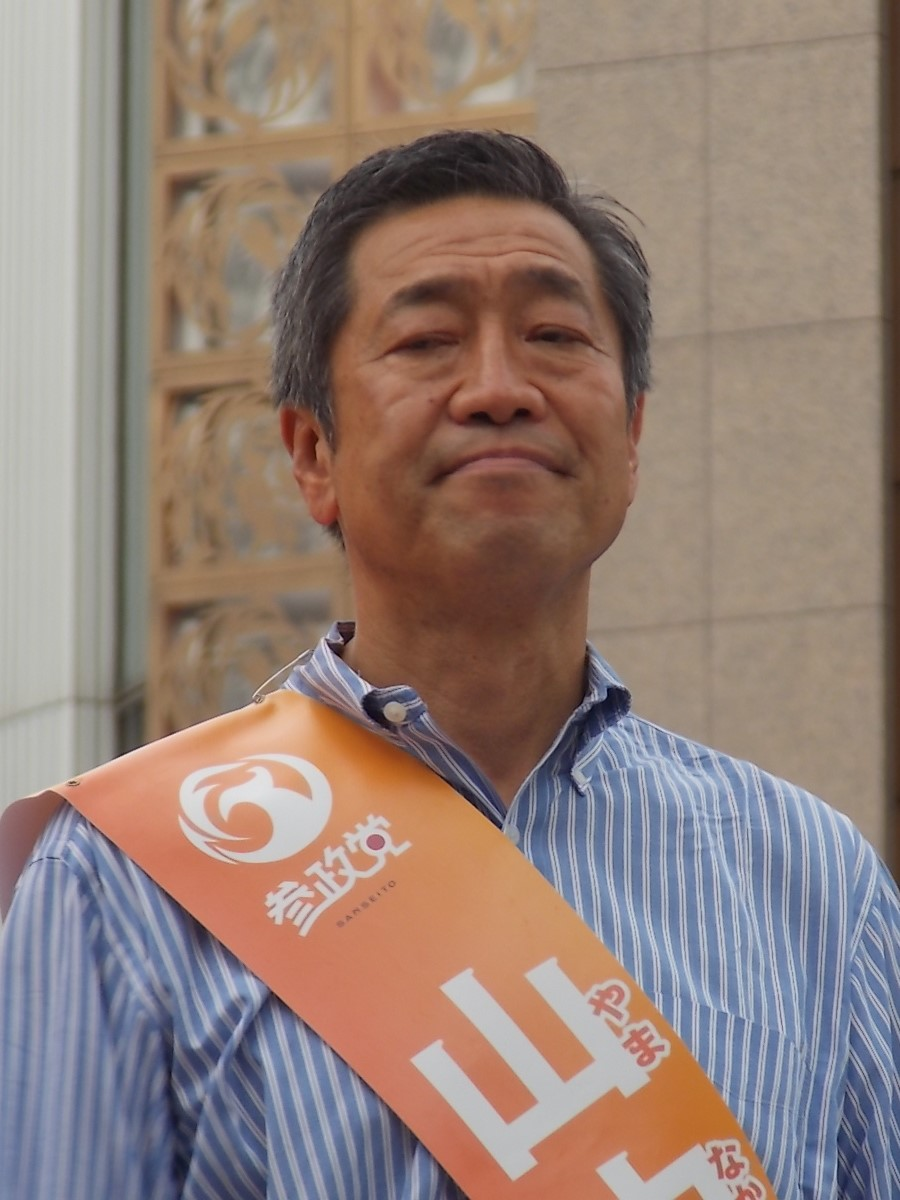

Member of the House of Councillors
- Incumbent
- Assumed office 29 July 2025

Personal details
- Born: 7 August 1958 (age 68) Aomori Prefecture, Japan
- Party: Sanseito
- Occupation: Author businessman politician

Sen Yamanaka (山中泉, Yamanaka Sen; born 7 August 1958) is a Japanese businessman, author, and politician. He is a member of the House of Councillors, elected in 2025 as a candidate of Sanseito, a right-wing party that emerged during the COVID-19 pandemic.

== Early life and education ==
Yamanaka was born on 7 August 1958, in Aomori Prefecture. He graduated from Aomori High School in 1977 and then moved to the United States, where he studied journalism and earned a degree from the University of Illinois.

=== Business career ===
After finishing his studies, Yamanaka worked for Nomura Securities in New York. He later worked as a stock trader in the United States before starting his own consulting business. As of 2022, he was based in Tokyo and ran consulting companies in both Japan and the United States. He also taught karate as an instructor at the International Budo Karate Federation's Miura Dojo.

== Political career ==
Yamanaka ran for the House of Representatives in the 2024 general election as a Sanseito candidate on the party's proportional list for the Tohoku bloc. Sanseito did not win a proportional seat in that bloc, and he was not elected.

He ran again in the July 2025 House of Councillors election, standing on Sanseito's nationwide proportional representation list. He received 28,234 votes, placing sixth among the party's candidates, and was elected as Sanseito won seven proportional seats in that election. He took office as a member of the House of Councillors on 29 July 2025.

As a councillor, Yamanaka has kept memorabilia associated with the U.S. Republican Party and the Make America Great Again movement in his Diet office. He has described Sanseito's "Japanese First" platform as comparable to the America First movement in the United States, saying Japan faces a comparable erosion of its traditions and culture.

Yamanaka’s sat on the committee on foreign affairs and defense, economical audit, and the special committee on political reform.

=== Connection to Charlie Kirk ===
On 7 September 2025, Yamanaka, alongside Sohei Kamiya, aided in being able to bring American political activist Charlie Kirk to Japan. He appeared on stage next to Kirk at a crowded Tokyo conference hall, where Kirk lectured against mass migration and globalism. After Kirk was fatally shot on 10 September, Yamanaka traveled to Arizona to serve as the official representative for Sanseito at his memorial service (21 September).

== Writing and public commentary ==
Yamanaka became known for using social media to describe aspects of American society that he says go unreported in the Japanese press, presenting his views from what he calls a consumer and taxpayer perspective. Drawing on his years living and working in the United States, he became a supporter of Ronald Reagan's brand of conservatism and later aligned himself with the politics associated with Donald Trump.

He wrote three books examining American political and social decline for a Japanese readership: "The End of America," published by Hojosha in 2021; "The Collapse of America," published by Hojosha in 2022; and "Japan Sinking Together with America," published by Business-sha in 2024.

On 14 January 2024, Yamanaka took part in a demonstration in Tokyo against the World Health Organization's proposed pandemic treaty. Speaking at the rally, he argued that the pandemic treaty and Japan's LGBT Understanding Promotion Act were the result of external pressure from the United States.
