= Yuji Adachi (politician) =

Japanese politician (born 1982)

- 安達 悠司

Member of the House of Councillors
- Incumbent
- Assumed office 29 July 2025
- Constituency: National PR

Personal details
- Born: 29 June 1982 (age 44) Fukuoka, Japan
- Party: Sanseitō
- Education: Kyoto University

Yuji Adachi (安達悠司, Adachi Yuji; born 29 June 1982) is a Japanese politician serving as a member of the House of Councillors since 2025. He was previously a candidate for the House of Councillors in the 2022 election, and a candidate for the House of Representatives in the 2024 election.
