= Manabu Matsuda =

Japanese politician

- 松田 学
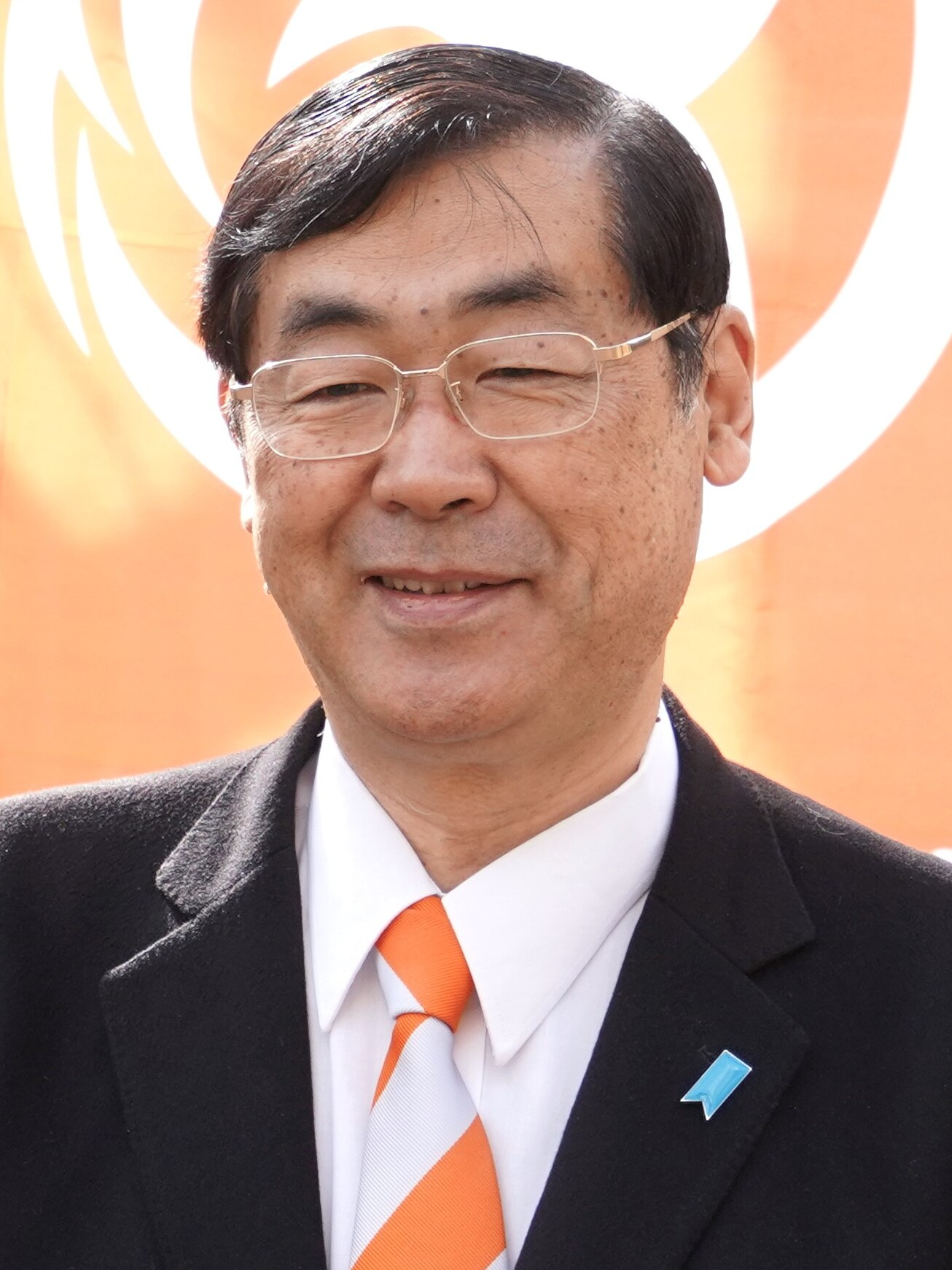
- Matsuda in 2025

Member of the House of Councillors
- Incumbent
- Assumed office 29 July 2025
- Constituency: National PR

Member of the House of Representatives
- In office 21 December 2012 – 21 November 2014
- Constituency: Southern Kanto PR

Personal details
- Born: 11 November 1957 (age 68) Kyoto, Japan
- Party: Sanseitō (since 2020)
- Other political affiliations: SPJ (2010–2012); JRP (2012–2014); PJK (2014–2016); LDP (2016–2020)
- Education: Faculty of Economics, University of Tokyo
- Occupation: Economist • Politician

Manabu Matsuda (born 11 November 1957) is a Japanese politician, finance bureaucrat and university professor. He is a member of the House of Councillors, since 2025, for the Sanseitō party.
