= Sanseitō =

Far-right Japanese political party

Party of Do it Yourself 参政党 Sanseitō
- Abbreviation: DIY
- Leader: Sohei Kamiya
- Deputy Leader: Rina Yoshikawa
- Founded: 17 March 2020; 6 years ago
- Headquarters: Akasaka Makabe Building 5F, 4–3, Akasaka 3-chome, Akasaka, Tokyo 107-0052, Japan
- Newspaper: Sanseitō DIY Times
- Ideology: Japanese nationalism; Ultraconservatism (Japanese); Right-wing populism; Anti-immigration
- Political position: Far-right
- Slogan: 投票したい政党がないから、自分たちでゼロからつくる; Tōhyō shitai seitō ga naikara, jibuntachide zero kara tsukuru ('Since there is no political party to vote for, we will create our own from scratch!')
- Senators: 15 / 248
- Representatives: 15 / 465
- Prefectural assembly members: 5 / 2,614
- Municipal assembly members: 200 / 28,696

Website
- Japanese; www.sanseito.jp; English; www.sanseito.jp/english/

Sanseitō (Japanese: 参政党, lit. 'Political Participation Party'; self-rendered as Party of Do It Yourself in English; DIY) is an ultraconservative, right-wing populist political party in Japan. It is on the far-right of the political spectrum. The party was founded in 2020 by Sohei Kamiya, the current secretary general of the party, and won a seat in the 2022 House of Councillors election, also becoming an official political party by winning more than 2% of the vote in the election. Sanseitō gained international media attention during the 2022 House of Councillors election due to Kamiya's antisemitic rhetoric during public appearances and campaign rallies. In the 2024 general election, the party won 3 seats. In the 2025 House of Councillors election, the party won more than 14 seats and came in third in the national popular vote. According to the party's leader Kamiya, it is the Japanese equivalent of Trumpism in the United States.

The party promotes COVID-19 misinformation. The party's president, Manabu Matsuda, has called COVID-19 vaccines a "murder weapon". The party is against same-sex marriage and LGBT rights. The party strongly opposes immigration, claiming that foreigners bring crime and receive better treatment than native citizens. It proposes the creation of a new constitution to replace the existing one and published a draft that contains minimal human rights protections.

== History ==
Sanseitō originated from a conservative YouTube channel called "Political Party DIY" created by streamer Kazuya Kyoumoto, politician Sohei Kamiya, and political analyst Yūya Watase in April 2019. The YouTube channel's objective is to show how to create a political party from scratch. In April 2020, the three founders of the YouTube channel officially started Sanseitō.

At the end of 2020, Jōichiro Shinohara, a founding member of the party, advocated a conspiracy theory alleging that the 2020 United States presidential election was "rigged", causing infighting among him and two founding members, Kyoumoto and Watase, who were skeptical of the conspiracy theory. This led to three of the founding members leaving the party in 2021, while Kamiya remained as the leader of the party with Manabu Matsuda, another founding member of the five-person party. At this time, Kamiya was thinking about the direction of the party, and decided that he would be able to expand his support base by focusing more on conspiracy theories and network marketing. Since then, a large number of anti-vaccination and organic faith groups who claim that the COVID-19 vaccine is a conspiracy by pharmaceutical companies joined the party, creating a new support base.

The party fielded five candidates for the national proportional representation block and 45 candidates in all constituencies for the 2022 Japanese House of Councillors election. Sohei Kamiya, a Sanseitō candidate in the national proportional representation block, won a seat. The party received more than 2% of the vote in the constituencies and proportional representation block, meeting the legal requirements for it to become a political party.

In the 2025 Japanese House of Councillors election, Sanseitō secured 14 seats based on its "Japanese First" slogan and a policy of tax reduction. It has gained votes from voters who had no previous party affiliation.

== Ideology and policies ==
Sanseitō is known for its ultraconservative ideology. It has also been referred to as extreme, "extremely conservative", and "hardline nationalist".

Sohei Kamiya, founder and secretary general of Sanseitō, said that Sanseitō has a high affinity with the conservative faction of the U.S. Republican Party, the far-right German party Alternative for Germany (AfD), the far-right French party National Rally (RN), and the right-wing populist party Reform UK. Kamiya has said that he learned many of his "emotional button-pushing themes and norm-breaking language" from U.S. president Donald Trump and stated that he was Japan's equivalent of Trump. According to Kamiya, Japan faces threats from shady globalists ("cabal of global elites"), criminal foreigners and a corrupt political establishment that is suffocating young people with taxes. His has proposed a "Japanese First" nationalist agenda. Sanseito has drawn mainly young male voters. Opponents and domestic media reports have accused him of being xenophobic, saying he is directing public anger with high prices and stagnant wages at Japan's foreign residents.

=== Diplomacy and military ===
==== Relationship and view on Russia ====
In July 2025, the party was accused of having ties with Russia after an upper house election candidate named Saya appeared in a Sputnik News interview, and for making payments to an advertising firm Vostok Joint Company. The party's general secretary Kamiya denied affiliations to Russia and claimed that the interview was authorized by a "low ranking staff" and that he was not informed beforehand. Kamiya said he has asked the responsible party staff to resign for authorizing the Sputnik interview. Sanseitō's relation with Russia has been questioned before as Kamiya said "Moscow should not be held entirely responsible for the war in Ukraine."

==== Security and defense ====
The party advocates an increase in the national defense budget of up to 3% of GDP. The party is against the stationing of American troops and American military bases in Japan. The party calls for "constitutional reform and strengthening of the Self-Defence Forces". The party also says that "Sado Island and Tsushima should be made independent and a nuclear-armed nation should be created." Furthermore, Kamiya claimed that NISA could fund the development of a domestic social media platform to strengthen information sovereignty.

=== Constitution ===
The party is in favour of "creating" a new Constitution, instead of reforming the Constitution. The party also criticizes the current Japanese Constitution, saying that it was "established under the supervision of GHQ during the occupation," and advocates "constitutional creation" in which the Japanese people should create a constitution that reflects the values of the Japanese people themselves. In May 2025, the Party announced the "New Constitution of Japan (Conceptual Draft)" on its official website as the result of its "Constitution Creation Project". The draft simplifies the current Constitution's 103 articles to 33 articles.

The main contents of the proposed Constitution by Sanseitō include the lack of any provisions on human rights such as equality of citizens or freedom of religion, and the simplification of provisions on the Diet, Cabinet, and courts. It does not include the words "sovereignty of the people" or "fundamental human rights", and it stipulates that "the nation shall possess sovereignty". It also stipulates that "Japan is a nation in which the Emperor and the people are one, governed by the Emperor", and that the Emperor is the subject of governing power. It states that the "national polity" is a family state in which the people revere the Emperor, and it stipulates that the Emperor decides the era name, Kimigayo is the national anthem, and Hinomaru is the national flag. It does not include any words on pacifism and stipulates the maintenance of a self-defense force. Supreme command of the Self-Defense Forces belongs to the Prime Minister and does not require a Cabinet decision to exercise it. Citizens are obligated to "protect Japan," and education requires the teaching of the Imperial Rescript on Education and Japanese myths. "The family is the foundation of society," marriage is "based on the union of a man and a woman", and husband and wife must have the same surname. The qualifications for citizenship are that "one or both parents must be Japanese," "Japanese must be one's native language," and "they must cherish Japan." Foreigners are not allowed to vote. There is a provision imposing an obligation on the media to report on national policies without bias.

=== Immigration and foreign investment ===
Japan took in 1 million workers over the period from 2022 to 2025 to fill jobs left vacant by the decline in the Japanese working-age population. While foreign nationals make up about 3 percent of Japan's population, Sanseito has won voters with calls to limit immigration.

The party has an anti-foreigner stance, based on claims that foreigners receive better treatment than native citizens and that Japan's culture is changing rapidly as a result of migration. The party calls for restrictions of foreign land ownership and a reduction in the number of foreign workers. In addition, the party is in favour of restricting land sales to any non-Japanese. Party members and supporters have made claims such as "Chinese people are buying up land and water resources on a large scale", as well as hostile remarks against Chinese students.

In his campaign speech leading up to the 2025 House of Councillors election, Kamiya claimed that foreigners are bringing crime to Japan. The party claimed that they would put "Japan First", leading to worries about xenophobia. Political analysts say that despite gaining more attention, Sanseitō is unable to dismiss its connection with conspiracy theories.

=== Economics ===
==== Fiscal policy ====
In terms of economics, in 2022 when Kamiya ran in election for the party, he claimed to support Abenomics but with modification needed. In 2025, he commented on it negatively, criticizing its affinity with "globalism". Kamiya said he would support economic policy of tax reduction and use fiscal policy to support the economy. The fiscal deficit would be supported by issuing more debt and possibly cryptocurrency.

==== Agriculture ====
In 2022, Toshiaki Yoshino, then party co-chair, claimed that wheat "did not exist before the war" and "was brought to Japan by GHQ (General Headquarters of the Supreme Commander for the Allied Powers) after the war to promote bread consumption, and is harmful to Japanese people, which is why there is an increase in cancer cases." Co-chair Kamiya agreed, saying, "Let's stop eating wheat," and "There is no need to protect the food culture created in America." In his edited book, "Sanseito Q&A Book: Basic Edition," Kamiya claimed that wheat was a food harmful to health that was brought to Japan by GHQ after the war and was popularized by "international finance capital", mainly of Jewish origin, to make profits.

==== Energy and environment ====
Sanseitō dismisses the need to cut greenhouse gas emission, claiming that global warming is up to further scientific discussion. The party proposes reducing renewable energy usage and advocate withdrawing from the Paris Agreement.

=== Social policy ===
==== Gender and equality ====
The party is against same-sex marriage, opposed the LGBT Understanding Promotion Act, and has called for the act to be repealed. It opposes LGBT rights. It is also against optional separate surnames for married couples, and the introduction of a quota system that would allocate a certain percentage of candidates and seats to women. The party maintains that imperial succession should be limited to the male line. In 2023, Kamiya proposed the reinstatement of the concubine system to increase the number of heirs to the throne, but this was criticized and the part was later removed from the official video.

==== Education ====
Regarding children's education, the party believes the government should set a priority policy of "educational reform that emphasizes thinking ability over academic ability" and promote "education based on a 'self-respect view of history' that values the country, region, and traditions." Specifically, it believes the government should set a goal of "amending the law to allow local governments to establish inquiry-based free schools".

==== Cultural industry ====
The party supports giving authority to the Agency for Cultural Affairs to restrict the content of manga, anime, and video games, drawing criticism from creators including Hideki Arai, Hiro Arikawa and Hikaru Yuzuki.

==== Health ====
===== Vaccine and mask wearing =====
The party advocated the ability to opt out of both wearing masks and taking vaccines during the COVID-19 pandemic, and has "characterized the pandemic as being staged". The party promotes a range of conspiracy theories regarding vaccines.

In the 2022 Japanese House of Councillors election the party proposed the "liberalisation of mask wearing" as their policy on coronavirus. Analysis found that as of 2022 their voter overlap with young people and child-rearing generation suffering from pandemic fatigue, especially in regions with lower vaccination rate. For these reasons, the party has been criticized and labeled as a far-right political party with adherence to conspiracy theories

==== Perspective of history and education ====
The party calls the Pacific War the "Greater East Asia War" and claims that it was "not a war of aggression". It also claims that its purpose was to liberate Asian countries from the West. Regarding the Battle of Okinawa, it believes that the Japanese military "fought to protect Okinawa". It also denies the existence of comfort women and the Nanjing Massacre. It regards the postwar view of history as a "masochistic view of history" that brainwashed into people by the policies of the Supreme Commander for the Allied Powers. The party advocates the education of a "self-respecting view of history". Representative Kamiya stated in the 2023 Diet session that GHQ implemented the War Guilt Information Program (WGIP), "an information operation to imprint upon the Japanese people the guilt that the Japanese are forever war criminals," and that this imprinted upon the Japanese people the belief that the Japanese military was bad throughout the last war.

===== Okinawa WWII claims =====
In May 2025, Sohei Kamiya, general secretary of Sanseitō, was accused of rewriting history after he claimed that during the Battle of Okinawa, local Okinawans were only killed by US soldiers and not the Imperial Japanese Army. The claim was endorsed by Shouji Nishida, conservative politician from the Liberal Democratic Party.

The claim caused an uproar in Okinawa because many Okinawan civilians were killed by the Japanese military during the Pacific War, as the military had its one-sided idea that any local people, who could be against the military or could be a spy or even could be a disturber, should be killed. Masaie Ishihara from Okinawa International University, who specializes in Okinawa history, issued a rebuttal to Sanseitō's claim, citing historical facts and asked politicians not to distort history. After the incident, the Okinawa Prefectural Assembly held a study group for the councilors in Okinawa, and passed a protest resolution to the remark which twists and denies the real fact of the battle in Okinawa.

== Supporters ==
According to Mina Okamura, a clinical psychologist and business psychology consultant, people who have been indifferent to politics and elections were interested in the keywords "anti-vaccine", "no mask", and "organic". Those policies were easy to catch on to by those who did not study politics. The Sanseitō voters on the whole do not think one's vote can change politics, but encourage political parties, which already exist, to try to do what they think is good. The speech of the party is emotionally rather than logically appealing. Therefore, they appeal to the sensibilities of the politically inexperienced and have increased their support.

According to Japanese political analyst Hiroo Hagino, the party is supported by the younger population, who have become disappointed with politics centred on the elderly. According to a JNN survey, a higher proportion of young people voted for Sanseitō in the last election than other demographics. Some Liberal Democratic Party (LDP) officials expressed worry that they might lose votes because both parties have conservative policies. Most of the Sanseitō voters did not support the Kishida government. The appeal of Sanseitō among young people is partly linked to the social crisis Japan is currently experiencing. Growing inequality due to slowing growth since the 1990s and persistent inflation, which is eroding purchasing power, have dampened the hopes for the future of younger generations, many of whom do not have permanent jobs.

== Election results ==
=== House of Representatives ===
Election	Leader	Constituency				Party list				Total		Position	Status
Election	Leader	Votes	%	Seats	+/-	Votes	%	Seats	+/-	Seats	+/-	Position	Status
2024	Sohei Kamiya	1,357,189	2.50%	0 / 289	New	1,870,347	3.43%	3 / 176	New	3 / 465	New	8th	Opposition
2026	Sohei Kamiya	3,924,223	6.95%	0 / 289	Steady	4,260,620	7.44%	15 / 176	▲12	15 / 465	▲12	5th	Opposition

=== House of Councillors ===
Election	Leader	Constituency			Party list			Seats				Position	Status
Election	Leader	Votes	%	Seats	Votes	%	Seats	Election	+/-	Total	+/-	Position	Status
2022	Manabu Matsuda	2,018,215	3.80	0 / 75	1,768,385	3.33	1 / 50	1 / 125	New	1 / 248	New	8th	Opposition
2025	Sohei Kamiya	9,264,284	15.66	7 / 75	7,425,054	12.55	7 / 50	14 / 125	▲14	15 / 248	▲14	6th	Opposition

=== By-elections ===
Election	Leader	Constituency	Candidate	Votes	%	Position	Status
2024	Sohei Kamiya	Tokyo 15th	Rina Yoshikawa	8,639	5.1	6th	Lost

== Leadership ==
Party leadership as of February 2026:

Position	Name
Leader	Sohei Kamiya
Deputy Leader	Rina Yoshikawa
Board Members	Hiroshi Ando
Board Members	Mayuko Toyota
Board Members	Yoshinori Mogami

=== Diet Members' group ===
Leadership of the Diet members' group as of February 2026:

Position	Name
Leader	Sohei Kamiya
Secretary General	Hiroshi Ando
Chairman of the Policy Research Council	Mayuko Toyota
Chairman in the House of Councillors	Manabu Matsuda
Chairman of the Diet Affairs Committee in the House of Representatives	Masamune Wada
Chairman of the Diet Affairs Committee in the House of Councillors	Hiroshi Ando

== Current Diet members ==
=== House of Representatives ===
Elected in 2026:

- Hitomi Aoki
- Masaru Ishikawa
- Keisuke Ito
- Yuichiro Kawa
- Toshiyuki Kinoshita
- Seiko Kudo
- Shunichi Makino
- Megumi Nakaya
- Kaoru Shimamura
- Mika Suzuki
- Koichiro Tani
- Mayuko Toyota
- Masamune Wada
- Airi Watanabe
- Rina Yoshikawa

=== House of Councillors ===
Elected in 2022:

- Sohei Kamiya

Elected in 2025:

- Yuji Adachi
- Hiroshi Ando
- Shota Goto
- Hiroki Hajikano
- Mana Iwamoto
- Manabu Matsuda
- Chisato Miyade
- Yuko Nakada
- Tsutomu Otsuka
- Shoko Sakurai
- Saya
- Junko Sugimoto
- Mizuho Umemura
- Sen Yamanaka
