= Rina Yoshikawa =

Japanese politician (born 1987)

- 吉川 里奈
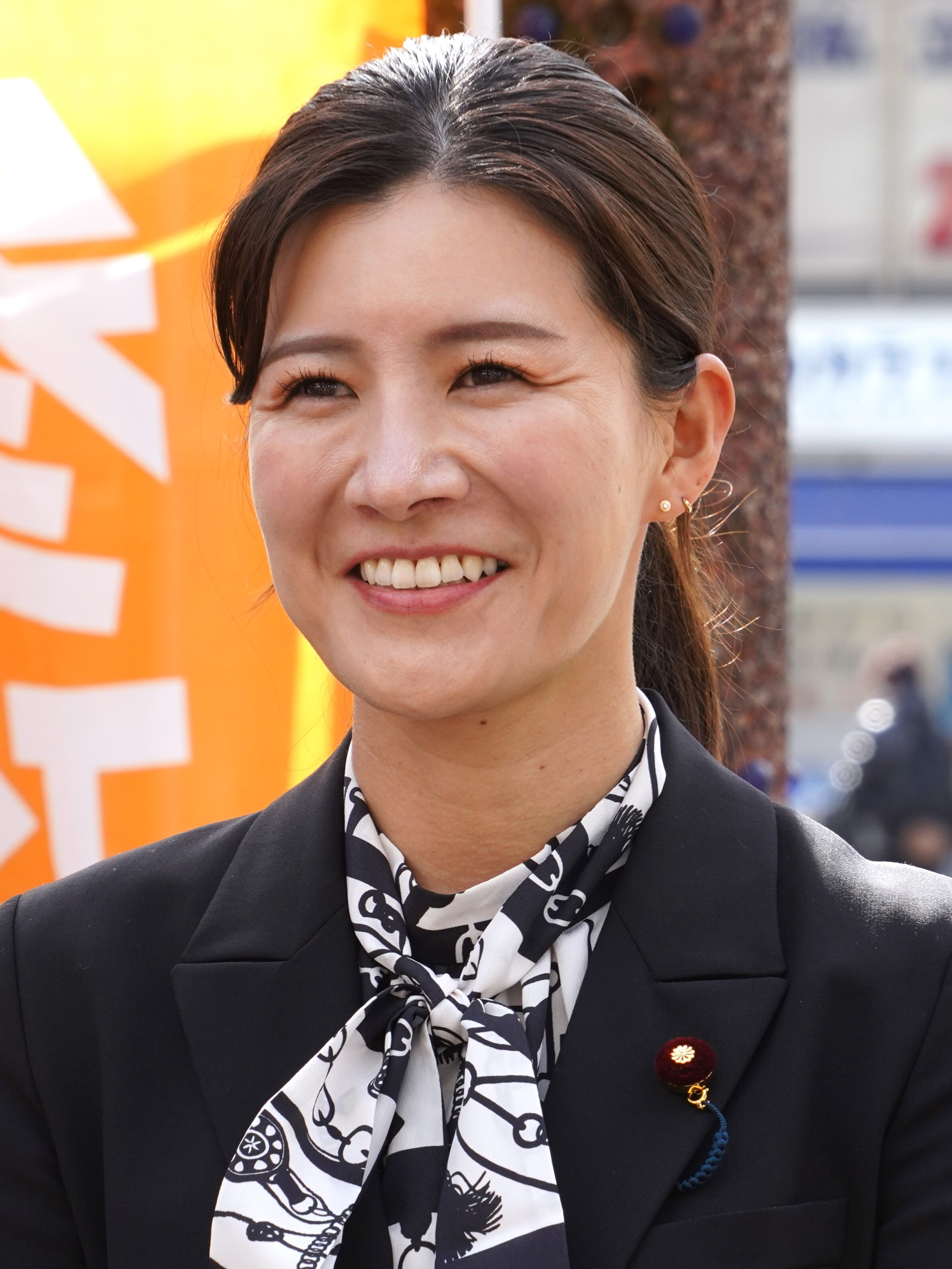
- Yoshikawa in 2025

Member of the House of Representatives
- Incumbent
- Assumed office 1 November 2024
- Constituency: Kyushu PR (2024–2026); Tokyo PR (2026–present)

Personal details
- Born: 25 May 1987 (age 39) Osaka, Japan
- Party: Sanseitō
- Education: Osaka Prefecture University

Rina Yoshikawa (吉川里奈, Yoshikawa Rina; born 25 May 1987) is a Japanese politician serving as a member of the House of Representatives since 2024. She is a registered nurse and public health nurse.
