= Sohei Kamiya =

Japanese politician (born 1977)

- 神谷 宗幣
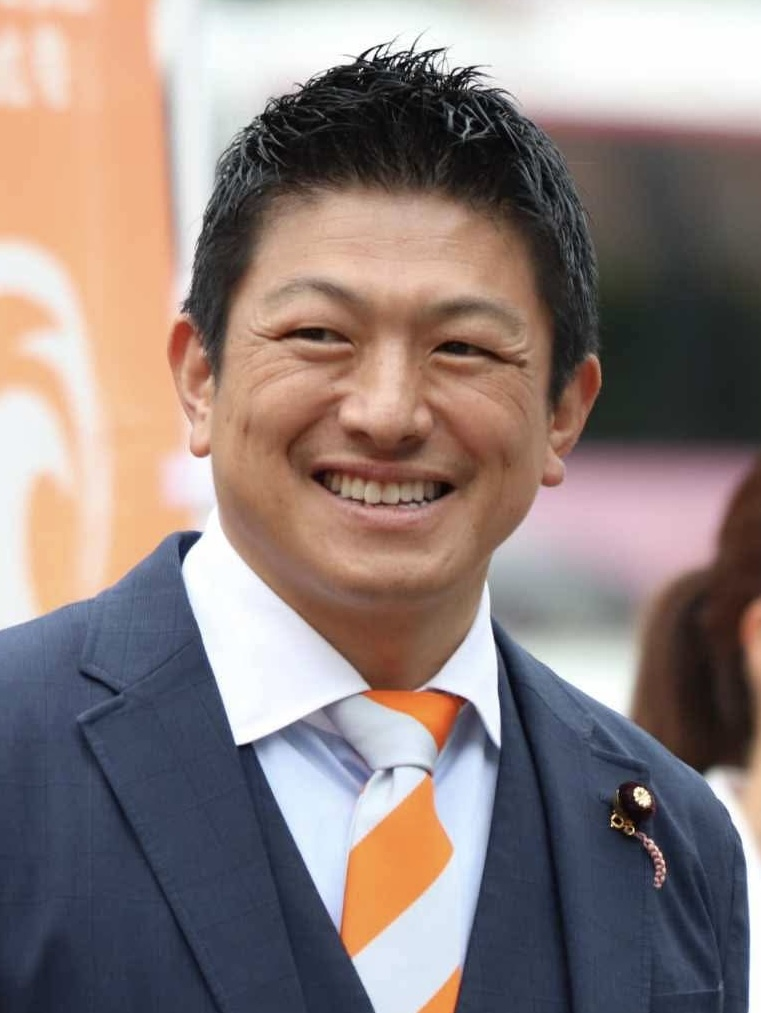
- Kamiya in 2025

Member of the House of Councillors
- Incumbent
- Assumed office 26 July 2022
- Constituency: National PR

Secretary-General of Sanseitō
- Incumbent
- Assumed office 17 March 2020
- Preceded by: Party established

Member of the Suita City Council
- In office 27 May 2007 – 26 December 2012

Personal details
- Born: 12 October 1977 (age 49) Takahama, Fukui, Japan
- Party: Sanseitō (since 2020)
- Other political affiliations: Suita Shinsenkai (2007–2012); LDP (2012–2015); Independent (2015–2020)
- Spouse: Fumi Kamiya (m. 2017)
- Children: 2
- Education: Kansai University (BLitt, JD)
- Occupation: Politician
- Website: www.kamiyasohei.jp

Military service
- Branch/service: Ground Self-Defense Force Reserve
- Years of service: 2012–2022
- Rank: Sergeant (3等陸曹, Santō rikusō)
- Unit: Reserves

Sohei Kamiya (神谷 宗幣, Kamiya Sōhei; born 12 October 1977) is a Japanese politician who is the founder and leader of the right-wing populist political party Sanseitō. Kamiya has been serving as a member of the House of Councillors since 2022 through the Proportional Representation Block. He advocates "Japanese first" and anti-globalism.

A conspiracy theorist who promotes COVID-19 and vaccine misinformation among others, Kamiya gained international media attention while campaigning for the 2022 House of Councillors election due to his antisemitic rhetoric during public appearances and campaign rallies. He has been described as a controversial politician and his party a cult by his political opponents.

== Early life ==
Kamiya was born in Takahama, Fukui on 12 October 1977. He graduated from Fukui Prefectural Wakasa High School, majoring in science and mathematics. He then entered Kansai University's Faculty of Letters, Department of History and Geography (now called the Department of General Humanities). He moved to Suita, Osaka after graduating from the same university in 2001. He became an English and history teacher at Fukui Prefectural Wakasa Higashi High School.

In 2002, he became an employee of Kamiya Store, a company run by his parents, and served as a store manager. In 2003, he made a short return as a teacher at Fukui Prefectural Wakasa Higashi High School. In 2004, he enrolled in Kansai University Law School's Legal Professional Training Course, completing his studies in 2007 and obtaining a Juris Doctor degree.

== Political career ==
=== Early years ===
In the 2007 Japanese local elections, Kamiya ran for the Suita City Council and was elected. He was inaugurated as a councilor on 27 May 2007. Kamiya founded the regional political party Suita Shinsengai in the same year. In 2010, he became a representative of the Kansai State Politicians Federation. In June of the same year, he established the Ryōma Project (jp) National Association and assumed the position of chairman. In 2011, Kamiya was re-elected as a member of the Suita City Council. He was then elected as the Vice Chairman of the City Council.

In November 2012, Kamiya joined the Liberal Democratic Party and became the head of the party's Osaka 13th district (Higashiōsaka) branch, replacing House of Representatives member Akira Nishino. Kamiya then resigned from his seat in the Suita City Council to run for the 2012 Japanese general election, with then-LDP President and former prime minister Shinzo Abe personally campaigning on behalf of Kamiya, but lost to Koichi Nishino from the Japan Restoration Party.

In 2013, Kamiya founded "Grand Strategy Co., Ltd." (later renamed "Ishiki Kaikaku Co., Ltd."), which distributed online video content such as dialogues with conservative commentators and ran personal development seminars. The seminar featured lecturers who advocated conspiracy theories and spirituals. Around this time, he handed out his business cards to persons he became close to that read, "Let's do politics like One Piece."

In the 2015 Japanese local elections, Kamiya ran for the Osaka Prefectural Assembly as an independent candidate for Suita's electoral district, but was defeated, placing 6th out of 6 candidates.

=== Sanseitō era ===
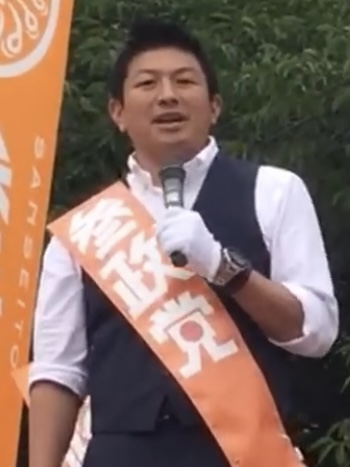
Kamiya in 2022

In 2019, Kamiya launched an online political organization "Political party DIY" (政党DIY (Do It Yourself), Seitō DIY), with a conservative YouTuber KAZUYA and political analyst Yūya Watase. A year later in March 2020, he formed the political party "Sanseitō" alongside Manabu Matsuda, a former finance bureaucrat, Yūya Watase, Kazuya and Jōichiro Shinohara, a former Japanese Communist Party member, and assumed the position of Secretary General. (Note: Later, an internal dispute arose between Shinohara, who continued to claim that the US presidential election in which Donald Trump lost was a "rigged election," and Kazuya and Watase, who were skeptical of the conspiracy theory. Kazuya insisted, "Don't tolerate conspiracy theories, because they will only spread lies," but, resulting in all three of them leaving Sanseitō in 2021. According to Mitsuru Kurayama (jp), a collaborator with ChGrandStrategy, after that, Kamiya said to him that the party would not gain widespread support unless it was more tolerant of conspiracy theories, spiritualism, and network marketing. Kurayama views this Kamiya's decision to go in that direction, as a cause of succeed to building a strong support base.)

On 10 July 2022, Kamiya filed his candidacy for the 2022 House of Councillors election for the Proportional Representation Block and was elected. He was inaugurated on 26 July 2022.

On 30 January 2023, five senior members of Sanseitō, including Kamiya, were sued by the NHK Party on the grounds of fraud. At a speech held in Shimonoseki on 31 January 2023, Kamiya criticized the NHK Party, claiming that "The NHK Party has executives who have ties to radical leftist groups and anti-Japan forces." In response, the NHK Party filed another lawsuit on 2 February 2023, claiming 100 million yen in damages against the Sanseitō and Kamiya.

=== 2025 Japanese House of Councillors election ===
On 30 June 2025, Sanseitō announced that a councillor who formerly belonged to the Japan Innovation Party, a right-wing populist party, had joined Sanseitō. The move means Sanseitō has five parliamentary seats, fulfilling the requirements of the Japan National Press Club to be invited to participate in televised debates.

In a debate held on 13 July, Kamiya put forth "Japanese First" as their primary policy. Kamiya was then criticized by representative from the Social Democratic Party for policies that would "only lead to xenophobia". The party had a breakthrough in the election, winning 14 seats.

On 1 August 2025, after the 27th regular election for the House of Councillors, the Party will create a new executive position for its Diet members, appointing Senator Ando Yutaka as Secretary-General and Chairman of the Policy Research Council. Meanwhile, Kamiya will continue to serve as Secretary-General, responsible for managing the party's overall affairs.

== Controversies ==
=== Antisemitism ===
While campaigning for Sanseitō in the 2022 Japanese House of Councillors election, Kamiya told the crowd that "Sanseitō would not sell out Japan to Jewish capital," a remark that was greeted with applause at the time but later resulted in international media coverage and condemnation.

In one of his own publications, Kamiya stated, "The powerful, who aim to create huge profits by selling vaccines and medicines, are actively calling for the wearing of masks through mass media such as newspapers and television in order to excessively inflame fear of the COVID-19 pandemic." He further explained that "the powerful" refers to international financial capital and multinational corporations. In the same book, Kamiya described these financial capital and multinational global corporations as "Jewish". When Kamiya appeared on a televised interview on 18 August 2022, after being elected to the House of Councillors, he said, "It is true that Jewish capital is involved, but I think it was wrong to write it in such a way that it could be misinterpreted as if it were all done by Jews, so I will have to correct it in the future."

=== Power harassment ===
In 2023, Kamiya was accused of power harassment against his former official secretary who later took her own life in December 2023. This followed complaints by the secretary to Sanseitō members and friends about power harassment by Kamiya.

Sanseitō denied the claim, saying that their own internal investigation did not prove the former secretary's suicide is related to power harassment. However, another staff testified his serious harassment.

In an interview with Asahi, Kamiya responded to claims about power harassment in his party, "That's because my way of speaking is quite blunt. I tend to say things clearly. However, there are various people who do things on their own, and it all ends up reflecting on the party's responsibility. So, we really need to establish strict rules to manage things effectively."

=== Historical revisionism ===
In May 2025, Kamiya was accused of attempting to rewrite history after he falsely claimed that during the Battle of Okinawa, local Okinawans were only killed by U.S. soldiers and not the Imperial Japanese Army.

The claim caused uproar in Okinawa, as many Okinawan civilians were killed by the Japanese military during the Pacific War. The military had a policy that any local people, who seemed suspect or a spy, should be killed. Masaie Ishihara from Okinawa International University, who specializes in Okinawa history, issued a rebuttal to Kamiya's claim, citing historical facts and also asking politicians not to distort history.

After the incident, the Okinawa Prefectural Assembly passed a resolution protesting Kamiya's remark stating that it twisted and denied the real facts of the battle in Okinawa. However, Kamiya remained defiant and said that his claims are "not fundamentally wrong". In a street speech in Okinawa, he said, "The Japanese military came to protect the people of the prefecture," and "We were able to return to the mainland because they damn fought for us." In response, a fact-checking article in the Okinawa Times cited the actual killings of residents and their expulsion from their trenches but did not find any documents to support his statements and deemed them unfounded.

He refers to the Pacific War as the "Greater East Asia War", and takes the position that it was "not a war of aggression." He also denies the existence of comfort women and the Nanjing Massacre. He regards the postwar view of history as a "masochistic views of history" that was brainwashed by the policies of SCAP GHQ.

=== Gender equality and LGBT issues ===
Kamiya has called gender equality policies a mistake, saying that they would support women into work which would mean they would be prevented from having more children.

In his opening remarks at the 2025 House of Councillors announcement ceremony, he made statements in relation to measures to combat the declining birthrate, such as, "We've been making mistakes up until now, with things like gender equality. It's good for women to advance in society, but only young women can have children," "I'm sorry, but older women can't have children," and "Women who give birth and raise children should be given a monthly payment of ¥100,000 per child. This is better than working part-time or in an office."

He is opposed to the LGBT Awareness Promotion Act. In a street speech in 2023, he said, "Diversity, political correctness, and gender equality are communism." and "If we do exactly what the Communist Party says, Japan will be ruined. In July 2023, Sankei Shimbun said, "Before we can show understanding towards LGBT, we need to increase understanding towards giving birth and raising goddamn children." "That's why we all need to say it together. We don't need LGBT, and there's no need to increase understanding."

== Political views ==
=== Foreign policy ===
- Kamiya believes that Japanese sanctions on Russia should be weakened.
- Kamiya believes that the Japanese government should take a "stronger stance" on China, which he sees as a threat to Japan.
- To improve Japan–South Korea relations, Kamiya believes that both sides should take mutual concessions on "conflicting issues". However, Kamiya is strongly opposed to the construction of the proposed Japan–Korea Undersea Tunnel.
- Kamiya states clearly that "Taiwan and Japan are a community of shared destiny."

=== Defense and security policy ===
- Kamiya is in favour of repealing and abolishing Article 9 of the Japanese Constitution for Japan to remilitarize and establish a standing armed forces.
- Kamiya believes that Japan's defense spending should be increased to 2% of the gross domestic product.
- Kamiya is in favor of Japan's Self Defense Forces being permitted to pre-emptively strike enemy forces in an event of "inevitable armed conflict", which is currently prohibited in accordance to the Constitution.
- Kamiya believes that Japan should possess nuclear weapons.
- Kamiya aims to enact antiespionage laws that are in line with international standards.

=== Economic policy ===
- Kamiya is in support of Abenomics but believes that reforms are needed for the economic policy to be a success.
- Kamiya believes that the Bank of Japan should return to tightened monetary policy.
- Kamiya is in support of lowering the consumption tax, and is opposed to progressive tax.
- Kamiya believes that nuclear power is necessary for the time being, but should slowly be phased out.
- Kamiya supports the construction of the Shikoku Shinkansen project.

=== Social policy ===
- Kamiya is opposed to the legalization of same-sex marriage.
- Kamiya is opposed to couples adopting different surnames.
- Kamiya is opposed to having a female heir in the Imperial House of Japan.
- On COVID-19 vaccination in Japan, Kamiya believes that the government has no business interfering with “the lives of individuals," opposing public-funded programs to encourage vaccination.
- During the COVID-19 pandemic, Kamiya asserted, "The people have the right to not wear masks." He further clarified that he adheres to health protocols, stating, "I wear masks on planes."
- Kamiya believes that young women are too focused on their career and this is not good for the Japanese population.
- Kamiya rejects the scientific consensus on climate change.

== Personal life ==
In a public speech, Kamiya said his party is "fine with people having a mistress". (Note: About this, Kamiya responded that he made this speech as an example that even if someone has made mistakes in the past, if they can overcome those mistakes and have the ability to work, they should be given the opportunity to thrive again.)

It was reported that according to Kamiya's old acquaintance, one of Kamiya's favorite books was Mein Kampf by Adolf Hitler. He said that Kamiya recommended this book to him.

In response to the news that Charlie Kirk was assassinated in Utah, three days after he had attended and lectured at a Sanseito event held in Tokyo, Kamiya said he was deeply saddened and shocked. He expressed his condolences, saying, "Charlie left us with a wealth of vital messages. Though his life was taken, no one can take his convictions or silence the message he carried. We will honor him in the only way worthy of his example: by treasuring what we received from him, by telling it faithfully, and by carrying it forward—here in Japan and beyond."

== Publications ==
=== Authored publications ===
- Sohei, Kamiya (2013).Turn on Japan's switch – The future can be changed by our own hands!
- Sohei, Kamiya (2014). Ignite the Yamato Spirit – Switch on Japan 2
- Sohei, Kamiya (2016). Learning from Ryōma Sakamoto "The power to make allies"
- Sohei, Kamiya (2019). The "Real Japan" that I want to tell my children
- Sohei, Kamiya (2020). Japanese Changemakers: 10 Years of the Ryōma Project ISBN 978-4-792-60729-6
- Sohei, Kamiya (2022). Sanseitō Q&A Book Basic Edition ISBN 978-4-792-60720-3

=== Co-authored publications ===
- Satoshi, Fujii (2014). The Philosophy of politics
- Kurayama, Mitsuru (2016). Take your time and learn! Modern Japanese history ISBN 978-4-908-18226-6
- Yoshino, Toshiaki (2022). Sanseitō: The party that awakens the people ISBN 978-4-792-60720-3
