= 2025 Japanese House of Councillors election =

- 20 July 2025

125 of the 248 seats in the House of Councillors 125 seats needed for a majority
- Registered: 103,591,806 (▼0.28%)
- Turnout: 58.51% (▲6.46 pp)
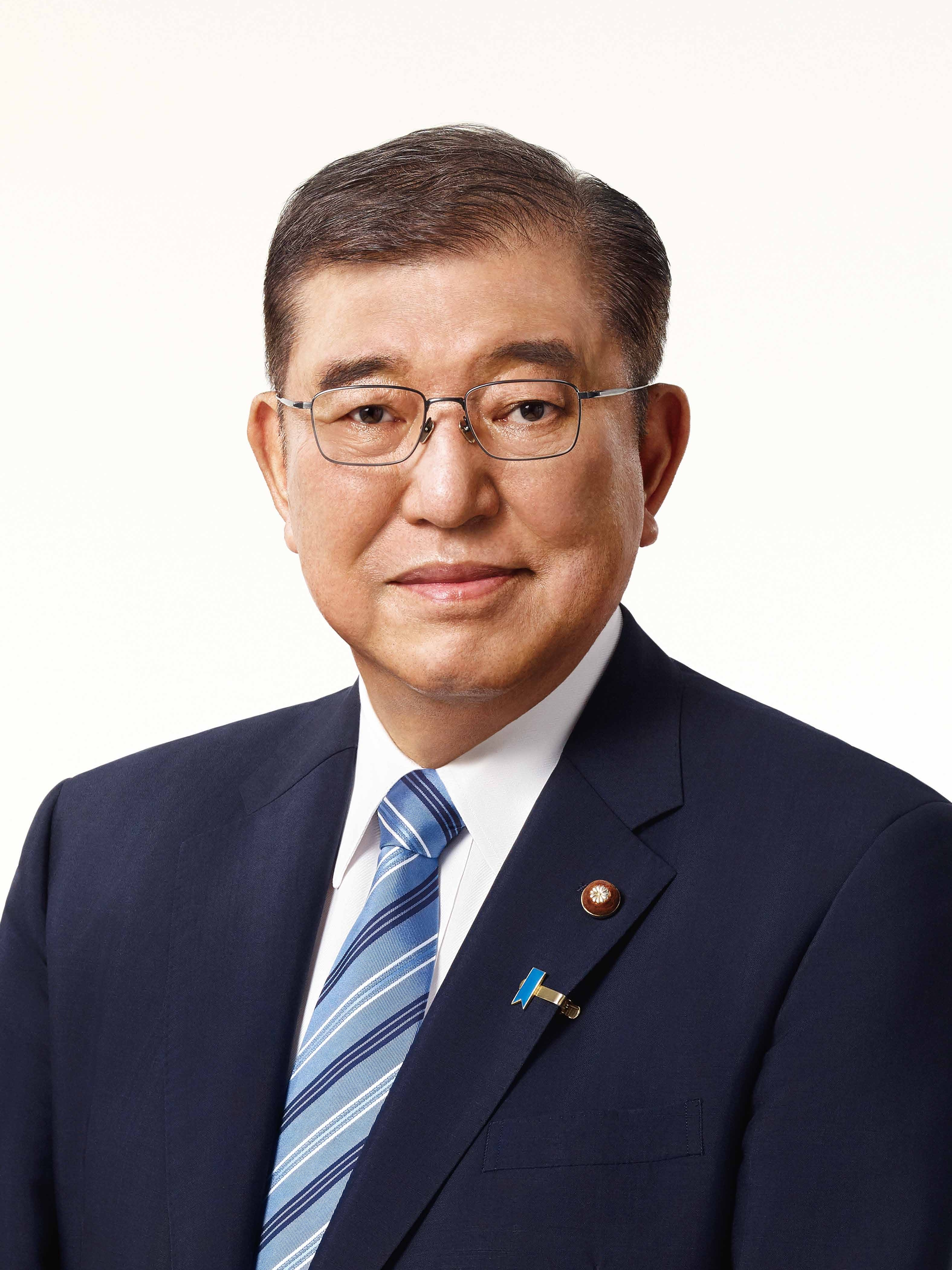

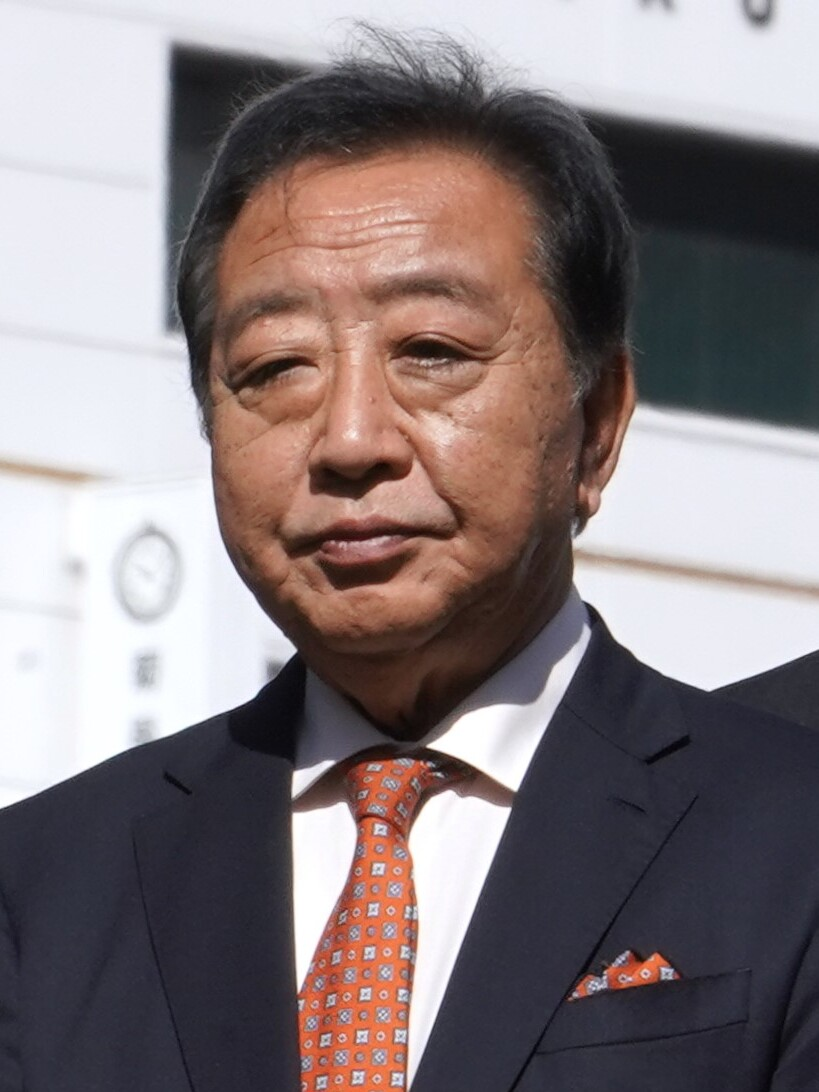

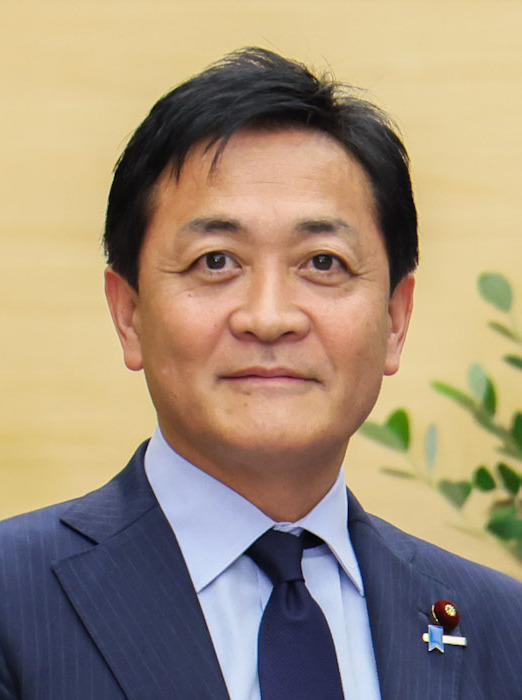

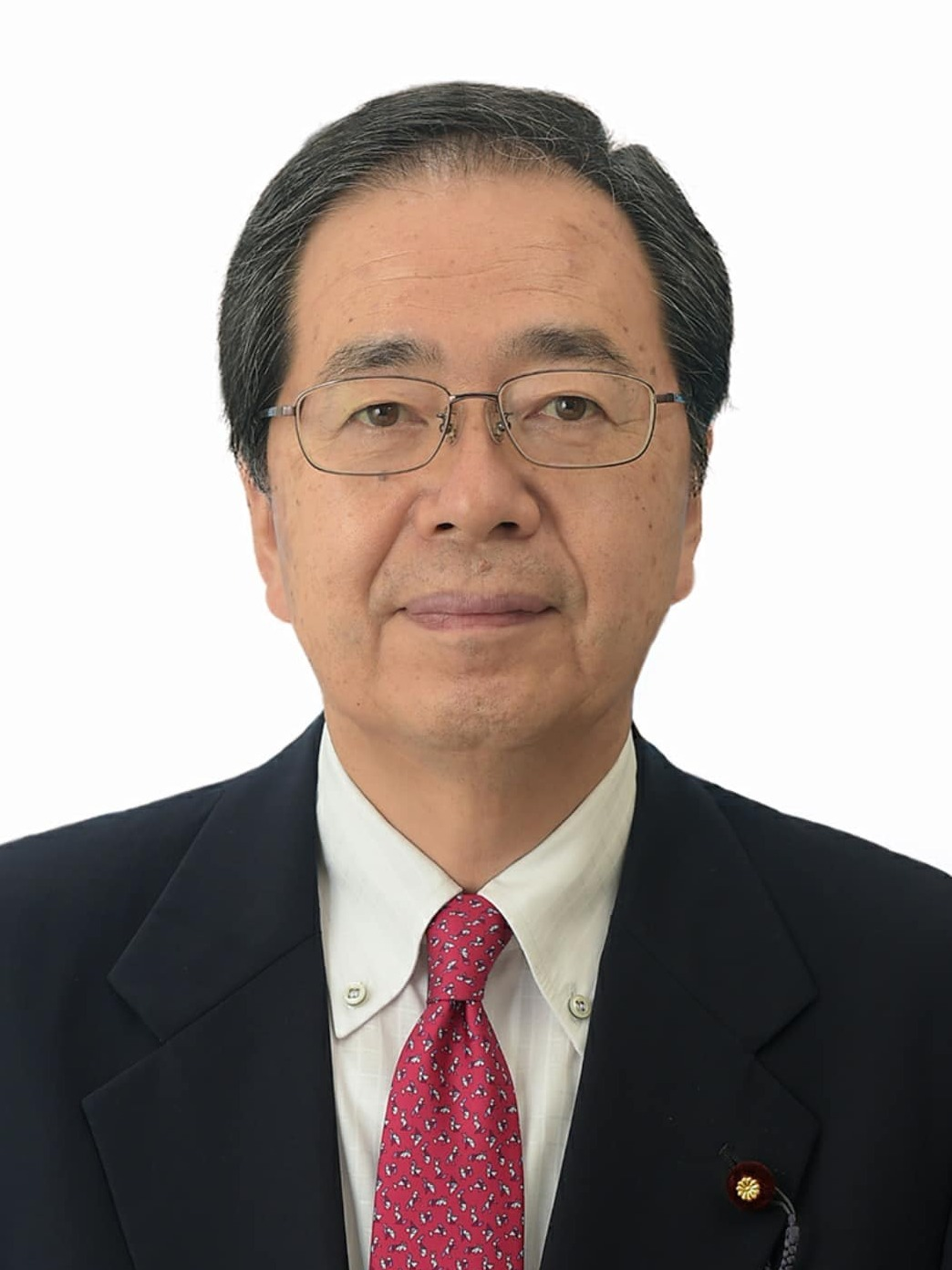

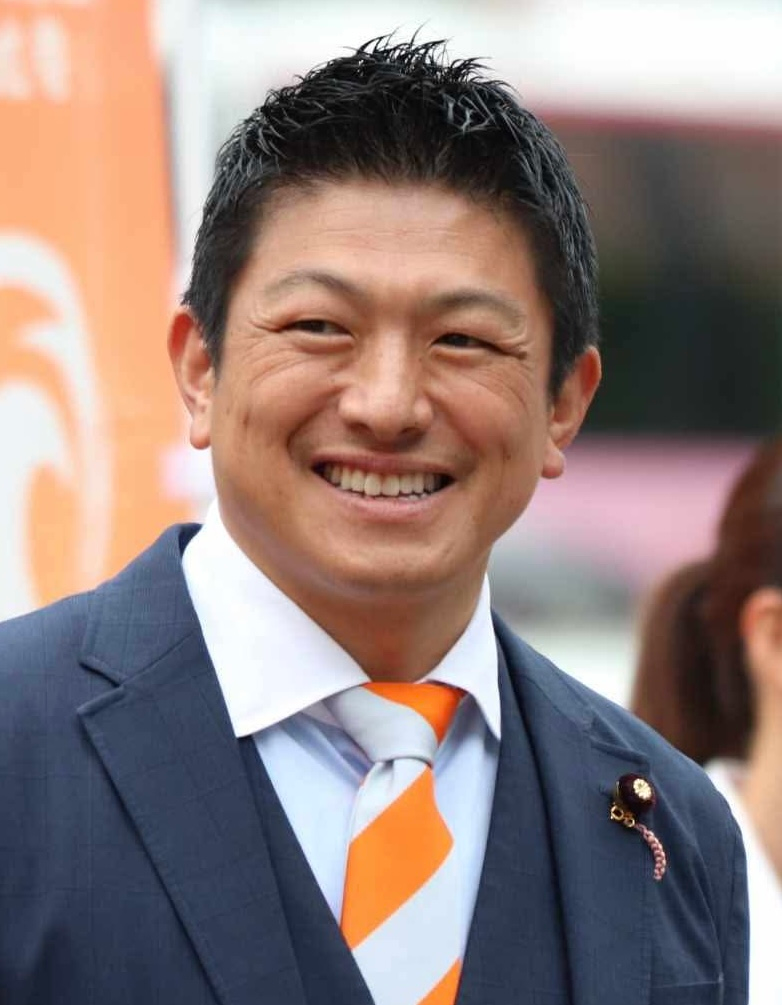

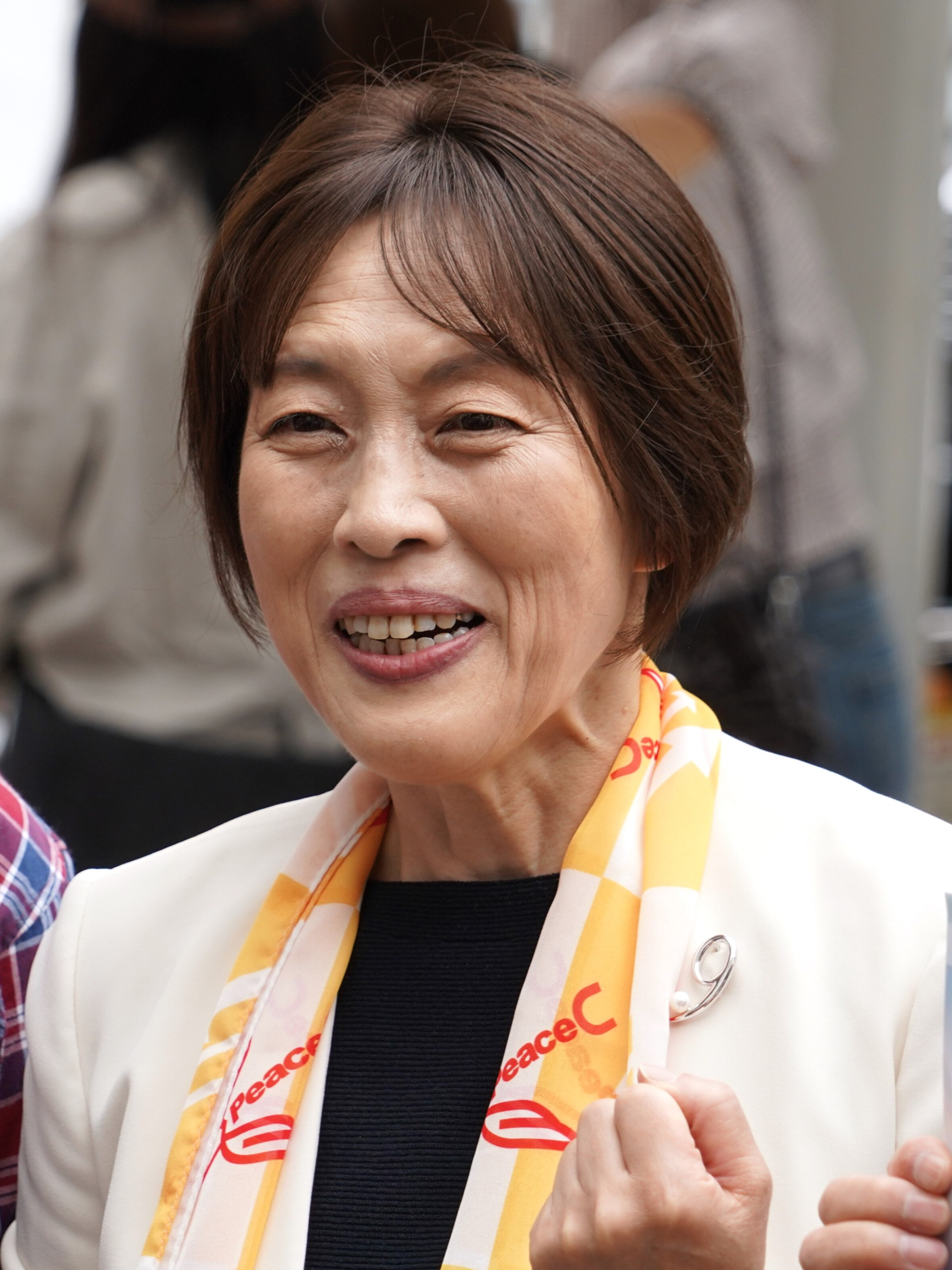

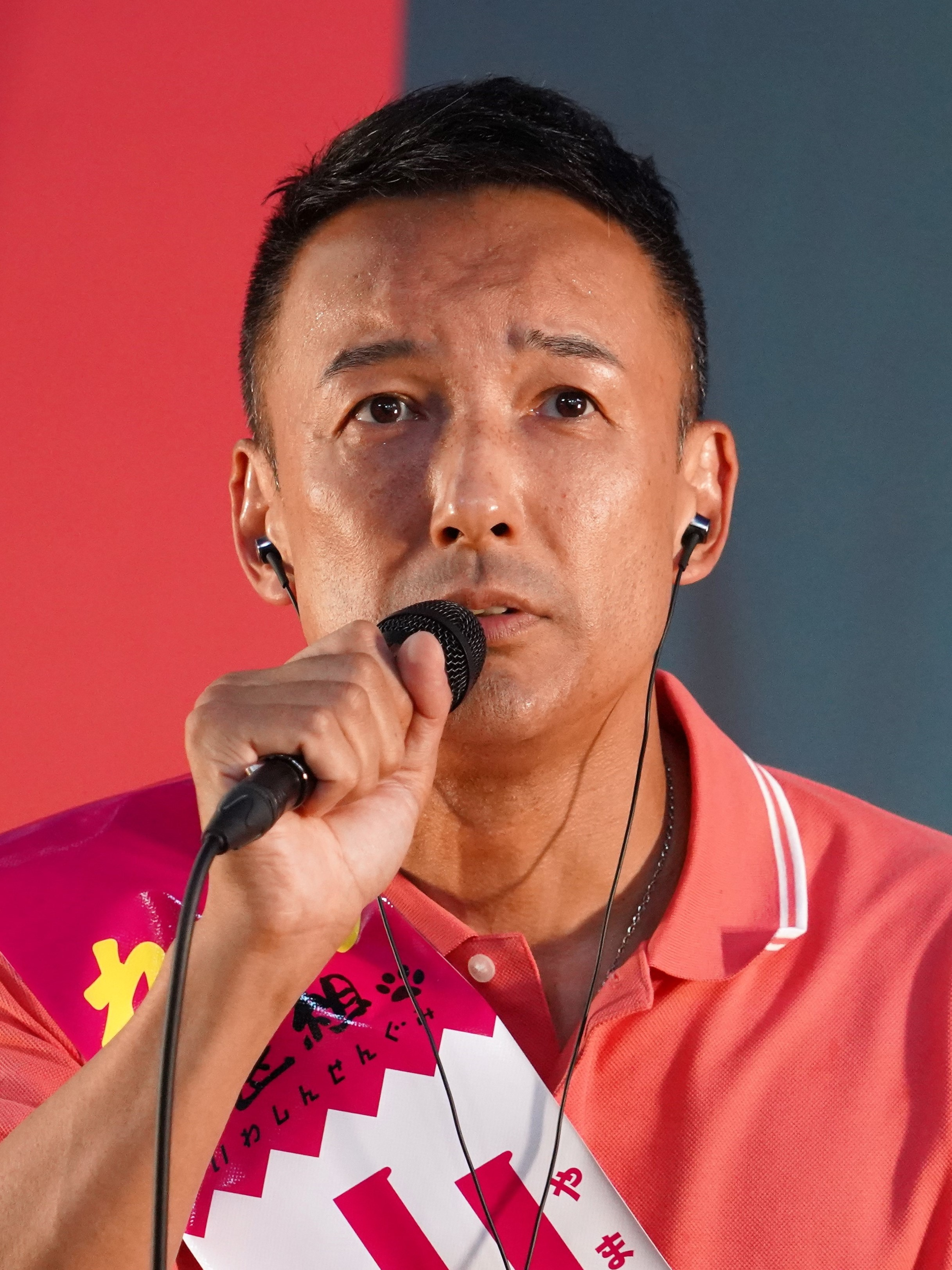

	First party	Second party	Third party
Leader	Shigeru Ishiba	Yoshihiko Noda	Yuichiro Tamaki
Party	LDP	CDP	DPP
Leader since	27 September 2024	23 September 2024	7 May 2018
Last election	119 seats	39 seats	10 seats
Seats won	39	22	17
Seats after	101	38	22
Seat change	▼18	▼1	▲12
Constituency vote	14,470,016	9,119,655	7,180,651
% and swing	24.47% (▼14.27 pp)	15.42% (▲0.09 pp)	12.14% (▲8.31 pp)
National vote	12,808,306	7,397,456	7,620,492
% and swing	21.65% (▼12.78 pp)	12.50% (▼0.27 pp)	12.88% (▲6.92 pp)
	Fourth party	Fifth party	Sixth party
Leader	Tetsuo Saito	Hirofumi Yoshimura; Seiji Maehara	Sohei Kamiya
Party	Komeito	Ishin	Sanseitō
Leader since	9 November 2024	1 December 2024	30 August 2023
Last election	27 seats	21 seats	1 seat
Seats won	8	7	14
Seats after	21	19	15
Seat change	▼6	▼2	▲14
Constituency vote	3,175,790	3,451,834	9,264,284
% and swing	5.37% (▼1.40 pp)	5.84% (▼4.57 pp)	15.67% (▲11.87 pp)
National vote	5,210,569	4,375,926	7,425,053
% and swing	8.81% (▼2.85 pp)	7.39% (▼7.41 pp)	12.55% (▲9.22 pp)
	Seventh party	Eighth party	Ninth party
Leader	Tomoko Tamura	Tarō Yamamoto	Naoki Hyakuta Takashi Kawamura
Party	JCP	Reiwa	CPJ
Leader since	18 January 2024	1 April 2019	1 September 2023
Last election	11 seats	5 seats	Did not exist
Seats won	3	3	2
Seats after	7	6	2
Seat change	▼4	▲1	New
Constituency vote	2,831,672	1,881,606	652,266
% and swing	4.79% (▼2.03 pp)	3.18% (▲1.32 pp)	1.10% (New)
National vote	2,864,738	3,879,914	2,982,093
% and swing	4.84% (▼2.00 pp)	6.56% (▲2.19 pp)	5.00% (New)
President before election
Masakazu Sekiguchi
LDP
Elected President
Masakazu Sekiguchi
LDP

Elections to the House of Councillors of Japan were held on 20 July 2025, with 124 of the 248 members of the upper house of the National Diet to be elected for a term of six years.

The election took place about 10 months into the premiership of Shigeru Ishiba, who governed Japan as Prime Minister after he won the leadership of the ruling Liberal Democratic Party (LDP) in September 2024. Shortly after he became Prime Minister, Ishiba announced snap elections to the House of Representatives for 27 October, which saw the LDP lose its majority for the first time since 2009. Since November 2024, Ishiba governed as the leader of a minority government, struggling to pass legislation and budget agreements without the support of opposition parties. Growing dissatisfaction with the LDP and a scandal involving gift vouchers given to MPs by Ishiba had hurt his approval ratings. Simultaneously, opposition parties had attempted to unite in an effort to deny the LDP a majority in the election; the Constitutional Democratic Party (CDP) and Ishin no Kai Party in particular formulated plans to hold "opposition primaries" in several prefectures. The 17-day campaign began on 3 July, with 518 total candidates running. Measures to combat the rising cost of living and immigration were the key issues of the election.

Similar to the outcome of the 2024 general election, the ruling coalition of the LDP and Komeito lost its majority in the House of Councillors. The LDP’s national vote share fell to 21.6%, the lowest result in the party’s history. The coalition’s decline was driven by growing support for smaller opposition parties. Parties making major gains included the center-right Democratic Party for the People, which displaced Komeito to become the third-largest party in the chamber and fourth-largest in the Diet overall, and the right-wing populist Sanseitō, whose anti-immigrant rhetoric drew significant media attention during the campaign period. In addition, a record number of women won seats in the Diet. Following the election, Ishiba faced calls to resign from some members within his party. He announced his intention to resign as party president in September 2025, triggering a snap leadership election to replace him in October.

These were the last Japanese upper house elections held before the official translation of its name was changed from "House of Councillors" to "Senate"; the Japanese name of the upper house, Sangiin (参議院), was unchanged.

== Electoral system ==
Elections to the House of Councillors are held every three years. Councillors serve six-year terms and half of the house is elected in each election. The councillors up for election in 2025 were last elected in 2019.

Similar to the House of Representatives, elections for the House of Councillors are contested via mixed-member majoritarian representation. In this parallel voting 74 of the 124 councillors up in this election were elected in single-member or multi-member districts corresponding to the prefectures of Japan using first-past-the-post (FPTP) voting in the single-member districts and the single non-transferable vote (SNTV) system in the multi-member prefectural districts. The remaining 50 councillors were elected in a single nationwide district using open-list party proportional representation via the D'Hondt method. Each prefectural district elects at least one councillor each election, meaning each district has at least two councillors in total. The number of councillors allotted to each prefectural district is based on population; for example, Tokyo has a total of twelve councillors, with six being elected each election. It should also be noted that certain prefectures are "combined" into one to correct the disparity in the value of one vote. Since 2016, Tottori and Shimane Prefectures and Tokushima and Kochi Prefectures, respectively, have been combined into single electoral districts. Although voters may cast preference votes for specific candidates in the proportional election, since 2018, parties may prioritize certain candidates to receive allocated seats ahead of their most-voted candidates. There is no electoral threshold that parties must meet to be allocated seats in the proportional component.

== Political parties ==
Parties	Leader	Ideology	Seats		Status
Parties	Leader	Ideology	Last election	Before election	Status
Liberal Democratic Party	Shigeru Ishiba	Conservatism; Japanese nationalism	119 / 248	115 / 248	Governing coalition
Constitutional Democratic Party of Japan	Yoshihiko Noda	Liberalism	39 / 248	38 / 248	Opposition
Komeito	Tetsuo Saito	Buddhist democracy Social conservatism	27 / 248	27 / 248	Governing coalition
Japan Innovation Party	Hirofumi Yoshimura; Seiji Maehara	Right-wing populism Economic liberalism	21 / 248	20 / 248	Opposition
Japanese Communist Party	Tomoko Tamura	Communism; Democratic socialism	11 / 248	11 / 248	Opposition
Democratic Party For the People	Yuichiro Tamaki	Conservatism	10 / 248	9 / 248	Opposition
Reiwa Shinsengumi	Tarō Yamamoto	Progressivism; Left-wing populism	5 / 248	5 / 248	Opposition
Collaborative Party (also known as the NHK Party)	Ayaka Otsu	Right-wing populism	2 / 248	2 / 248	Opposition
Social Democratic Party	Mizuho Fukushima	Social democracy	1 / 248	2 / 248	Opposition
Okinawa Social Mass Party	Tetsumi Takara	Social democracy	2 / 465	2 / 248	Unaffiliated
Sanseitō	Sohei Kamiya	Ultraconservatism; Right-wing populism	1 / 248	2 / 248	Unaffiliated

== Background ==
=== Previous election ===
The October 2024 general election resulted in the loss of majority of the Liberal Democratic Party-Komeito governing coalition in the House of Representatives under Prime Minister Shigeru Ishiba, with the possibility of the ruling coalition suffering another "major defeat" at the House of Councillors election if opposition parties unite their candidates.

=== Multi-party cooperation ===
==== Opposition unification attempts ====
According to Jiji Press, if five opposition parties, including the main opposition Constitutional Democratic Party of Japan (CDP), make deals in the 32 single-seat constituencies, the ruling LDP-Komeito coalition is projected to win 10 seats against the opposition camp's 22, and only three if the Nippon Ishin no Kai, also known as the Japan Innovation Party, joins the opposition alliance.

In January 2025 Ishin introduced a plan to the CDP that would seek to "unify" the opposition in single-member districts against the LDP; their proposal involves the use of online polls and holding primary elections. Reiwa, the Social Democratic Party, and the Democratic Party For the People (DPP) cast doubt on the plan while the Communists declined to participate entirely.

Later in February, Ishin announced that a decision on whether or not to hold opposition primaries would be made within the month; party Secretary General Ryohei Iwatani commented that every party except the Communist Party had been "quite positive" about the plan. He also said the party was open to reforms to their plan by the CDP.

In early March, Ishin co-leader Seiji Maehara proposed running a primary system with the CDP in the prefectures of Shiga, Nara and Wakayama (1 seat each) for election; all of them were in the area of influence of Osaka, Ishin's stronghold.

Speaking on the prospect of uniting the opposition CDP leader Yoshihiko Noda stated "I generally support the plan, but I have told Maehara that we need the participation of all opposition parties, so we should make an appeal for them to participate, and that if the only opposition candidates in a constituency are from the Constitutional Democratic Party and the Japan Innovation Party [Ishin], then we should settle it through a primary election."

On 1 April, Ichirō Ozawa announced an agreement between the CDP and Ishin no Kai to have an unified single candidate in Shiga, Nara and Wakayama Prefectures.

On 6 March, the DPP began working on a policy agreement with the CDP. In March, the Mainichi Shimbun reported that the CDP and DPP were expected to sign a basic policy agreement ahead of the election that would likely cover the Constitution, foreign policy and security, economy, energy, and diversity.

Sankei Shimbun reported in early April that cooperation between the CDP and DPP cooperation was in doubt ahead of the election, with the former viewing the latter as an insincere "cocky upstart," while the DPP viewed CDP members as not garnering support because it "only cares about elections." The two parties continued to struggle with election cooperation.

CDP leader Noda said on 10 May that there is a "great possibility" that a general election could be held either on the same day or around the same time of the upper house election.

==== LDP-Komeito alliance ====
The ruling LDP signed an agreement with the Komeito (their coalition partner since 2012) in February regarding cooperation in the election, which stated that the LDP would support Komeito candidates in five districts and set conditions for Komeito support of those implicated in the slush fund scandal.

At the LDP’s party convention on 9 March, Ishiba said the party should aim to unify and return to its roots of “people-friendly politics.” The day earlier Ishiba stated he wanted to “win at all costs.”

Ishiba’s former leadership rival Takayuki Kobayashi criticized Ishiba’s speech, claiming he did not get a sense of a string message from the Prime Minister; others believed the part’s minority status in the Diet hurt the LDP, and Ishiba's efforts to shape the country’s national agenda. Sanae Takaichi, also a former LDP leadership rival, was critical of Ishiba's speech as well.

Kobayashi would later advise the party to assess Ishiba's presidential election manifesto & the party's previous general election manifesto ahead of the summer upper house election, arguing that the party should check on progress.

On the same day as Ishiba's speech, Mio Sugita was revealed as an endorsed candidate for proportional representation in the election. In 2022 and 2023, Sugita had been found guilty of human rights violations by the Sapporo Legal Affairs Bureau for posting discriminatory statements against ethnic Koreans, LGBT people and others on her blog. Sugita's remarks, for which she apologized, were largely considered to be racist.

The Asahi Shimbun reported that the LDP's decision to endorse the controversial former lawmaker was likely due to requests from the conservative wing of the faction close to the late Prime Minister Shinzo Abe, whom Sugita was said to be close to.

On 11 April 2025, LDP Chief Advisor Tarō Asō described the election situation as an "emergency" for the LDP, and stated that the ruling parties had to maintain their majority in the upper house.

The Komeito published a draft manifesto centered around lowering gas prices and getting rid of provisional gas taxes. Regarding tariffs imposed by the United States, Chief Representative Tetsuo Saito argued that "the most effective [economic response] would be a tax cut," and said that a cash handout should be distributed in the meantime until tax cuts are implemented so as to provide relief to citizens.

Mainichi reported that the coalition could only afford to lose 16 seats to avoid losing their majority in the upper house.

=== Government reactions and low approval ratings ===
Prime Minister Ishiba's cabinet has faced consistently low approval ratings since taking office in October 2024, succeeding former Prime Minister Fumio Kishida who had also suffered from sub-20% approval ratings in July 2025, saw the rise of LDP rebels and Sanseito known as the "Summer of Discontent".

Meanwhile, the low approval ratings and the government's situation in the election put immense pressure on the ruling coalition (LDP and Komeito). Having already lost their majority in the lower house election in October 2024, the July 20 upper house election was a crucial test for Ishiba's leadership. Failing to secure the necessary 50 seats to maintain a majority in the House of Councillors could intensify calls for his resignation.

The party reportedly gained support from those who had supported the LDP during Shinzo Abe's incumbency, but were strongly dissatisfied with the succeeding prime ministers. The sudden growth of the party was dubbed the "Eye of the storm".

==== Other developments ====
The “partial coalition” between the LDP-Komeito coalition and the opposition Ishin party reached an agreement in February that ensued the passage of the fiscal year 2025 budget. The budget included provisions that called free high school education and social insurance premium fee cuts. The budget was finalized in March 2025 after several revisions.

The ruling LDP-Komeito coalition and the opposition DPP later agreed to maintain political donations to party branches under certain conditions and to strengthen information disclosures.

In March, reinstated DPP leader Yuichiro Tamaki stated that the party's goal was to win 21 or more seats in the Upper House. Tamaki later clarified that the party would "field as many candidates as possible..." on 25 March.

That same month, the DPP nominated university professor and conservative commentator Yamada Yoshihiko as a candidate in the proportional representation block.

Yasushi Adachi, a former member of Ishin who left the party in 2024, announced he would run as a candidate of the DPP in Osaka Prefecture, Ishin's regional stronghold. If he wins he might be the first non-Ishin non-government member since 2013.

Sanseito announced they would aim for six seats.

The Social Democratic Party said they would attempt to win more than three seats in the chamber.

=== Ishiba gift certificate scandal ===
On 13 March 2025, The Asahi Shimbun revealed that several LDP members of parliament who were elected for the first time in the 2024 general election received gift certificates from the office of Ishiba in early March. Ishiba’s office later confirmed that he had distributed gift certificates worth approximately ¥100,000 ($676) each to about a dozen lawmakers as "souvenirs” intended to be used to purchase new suits.

Ishiba claimed the certificates were paid from his personal funds and were not intended for political activities but as a supplement for living expenses.

According to the Yomiuri Shimbun, most of the lawmakers decided to return the gift certificates instead of using them. The incident took place while discussions were underway in the Diet on the transparency of political funds, particularly regarding corporate and organizational donations.

Ishiba had met with Komeito Chief Representative Tetsuo Saito the day before, who pledged his party's support for him; earlier in the week upper house LDP lawmaker Shoji Nishida publicly stated that Ishiba should be replaced by a new party President.

Ishiba, who was elected as LDP President on a reformist platform, was widely criticized by opposition lawmakers. CDP leader Yoshihiko Noda promised to pursue inquiries over the incident in the Diet. Osaka Governor and co-leader of the Ishin party Hirofumi Yoshimura criticized Ishiba’s actions.

The Political Funds Control Act prohibits donations of cash or securities to individual politicians; the 100,000 yen in gift certificates in this case could have been considered a 'donation’ in this case.

==== Unrealized motions of no-confidence ====
Leader of the Opposition and CDP leader Yoshihiko Noda stated during a press conference on 21 March that his party would "comprehensively determine" whether to submit a no-confidence motion, suggesting that the scandal alone could not lead to submission. Earlier that month, The Asahi Shimbun reported that the CDP had shifted towards a "wait and see" tactic instead of pressuring Ishiba to step down immediately, likely to avoid a simple change in leaders that could play to the LDP's advantage ahead of the election.

DPP leader Yuichiro Tamaki said on 17 March that his party would "consider a range of options" including a no-confidence motion in dealing with the scandal; he encouraged Ishiba should testify in front of the Ethics Committee.

Ishin's co-leader Seiji Maehara later told the Sankei Shimbun in an exclusive interview that the party could vote in favor of a no-confidence motion, stating that "everything is on the table" despite the party's cooperation with the LDP on the annual budget.

Tamaki later encouraged the CDP to seriously consider proposing a no-confidence motion against the government if its policies did not align with "national interests."

After tariffs were announced by the Trump administration in the United States, the CDP said they would temporarily cease pursuing political scandals during Diet deliberation to instead work with the government on responding to tariffs, with Noda saying he would use the leaders' debate in April for such discussions.

In June, Yukio Edano of the CDP said he was opposed to submitting a no-confidence motion, as there had yet to be discussions on an alternative to the LDP-Komeito government.

=== Election date ===
According to the Public Offices Election Act, the House of Councillors election is to be held within 30 days after the Diet is closed, starting from 24 June. On the same day, the government decided that the election would be held on 20 July, a Sunday. Official campaigning began on 3 July.

== Campaign issues ==
The election centered on pressing economic and social issues amid rising inflation and international trade tensions. The ruling LDP and its coalition partner Komeito emphasized fiscal responsibility, opposing broad consumption tax cuts to preserve funding for social security and welfare, instead promoting targeted cash handouts and wage increases. Opposition parties, including the CDP, DPP, and the JCP, advocated various forms of consumption tax reduction or abolition to ease the financial burden on households.

Trade tensions with the United States escalated following the re-election of Donald Trump, who imposed high tariffs on Japanese imports, including a 24% "reciprocal" tariff on many goods. Prime Minister Shigeru Ishiba faced domestic pressure to negotiate favorable terms while public trust in the US declined, with concerns growing over the potential impact of tariffs on wages and the broader economy.

Social issues also played a significant role in the campaign. The surge in rice prices highlighted food security concerns and prompted calls for increased rice production and government support to stabilize prices. Immigration remained a divisive topic, with debates over balancing stricter controls against addressing Japan's demographic challenges. Other concerns included nuclear energy policy, gender equality, and welfare reforms.

=== Foreign relations and Trump tariffs ===
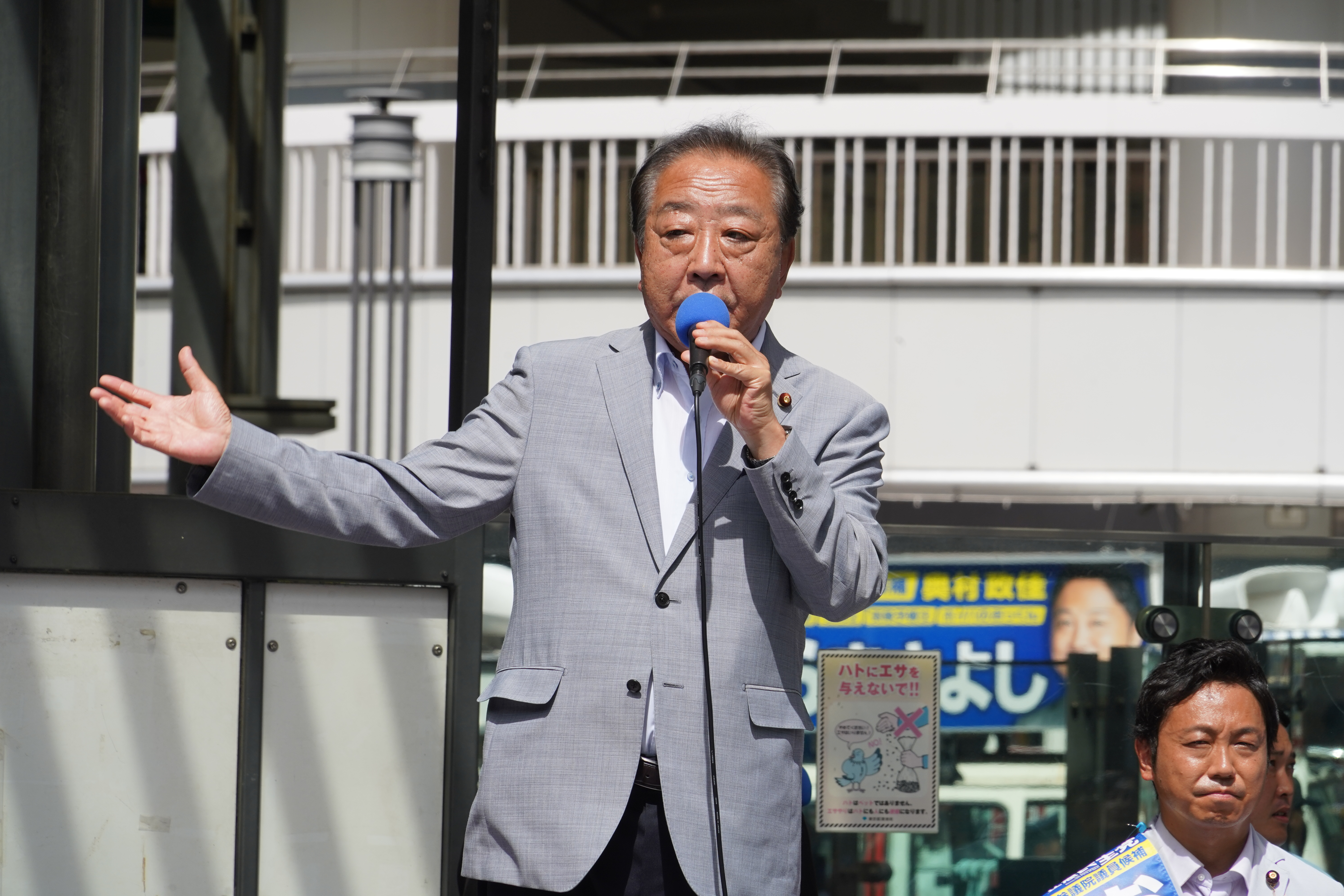
CDP leader Yoshihiko Noda campaigning in Yūrakuchō on 19 July 2025.

The re-election of Donald Trump in the 2024 United States presidential election brought a sharp renewed focus on trade imbalances and the aggressive use of tariffs as a tool of economic policy. The Trump administration implemented a baseline 10% tariff on nearly all imports, alongside a potential 24% "reciprocal" tariff specifically targeting most Japanese goods. This followed existing higher tariffs on key Japanese exports such as vehicles, auto parts, steel, and aluminum.

Shigeru Ishiba's government faced increasing pressure to negotiate a favorable trade deal with the United States amid rising tariff tensions. However, public opinion polls indicated a decline in trust toward the US administration, complicating Japan's diplomatic stance. While politicians attempted to frame tariffs as a critical electoral issue, many Japanese voters remained more concerned with immediate economic difficulties such as inflation and stagnant wages, rather than the abstract impact of trade tariffs. Nonetheless, economists and policymakers warned that worsening tariff conditions could trigger further economic slowdown in Japan, potentially leading to falling wages—a major socioeconomic concern.

As of mid-2025, the ruling LDP-Komeito coalition had not reached a definitive agreement with the Trump administration regarding the tariffs imposed on Japanese imports. The lack of resolution remained a significant point of criticism from opposition parties, who highlighted the limited progress made despite repeated diplomatic visits to Washington by Japan's chief negotiator, Ryosei Akazawa. Prime Minister Ishiba, meanwhile, maintained a public stance of optimism, assuring voters that the trade negotiations would ultimately succeed and produce a fair outcome for Japan.

The renewed tariff tensions and uncertainty over trade relations contributed to increased public discourse around Japan's economic resilience and the future of its export-driven economy. Analysts noted that the ongoing situation underscored the complexities of Japan–US economic ties in the era of shifting geopolitical priorities and rising protectionism.

=== Rice crisis ===
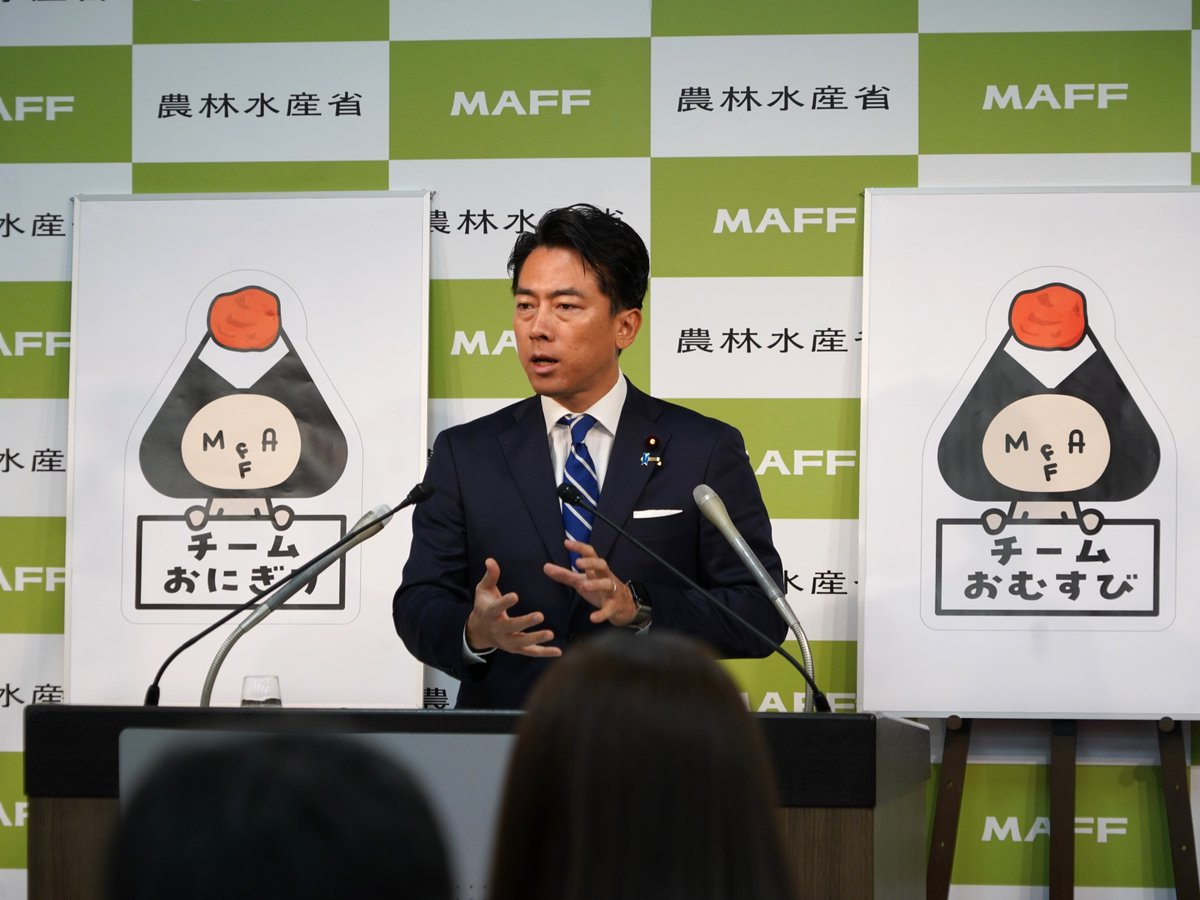
Agriculture Minister Shinjiro Koizumi, appointed in May 2025.

Starting around the summer of 2024, Japan experienced significant spikes in rice prices, an event that has been referred to in the media as "The raging rice riots of Reiwa". (Note: The original text, "令和の米騒動" (Reiwa no komesōdō) literally translates to this if their meaning is directly taken.) This phrase draws a historical parallel to the original "rice riots" (米騒動, komesōdō) that occurred in the Taisho period, emphasizing the widespread social and economic impact of the price surges.

The surge in rice prices sparked political debate and prompted the LDP to advocate for increased rice production as a means to stabilize prices and ensure food security. Agriculture Minister Koizumi emphasized the need for agricultural cooperatives (農協, nōkyō) to take on more risk and expand their rice purchasing efforts, signaling government intent to intervene in the rice market to protect both producers and consumers.

This rice crisis highlighted broader concerns about food security in Japan, particularly as inflation and the cost-of-living crisis disproportionately impacted vulnerable populations, including the elderly and low-income households. Public discourse stressed the need for stronger political leadership and comprehensive policy responses to address the rising costs of basic necessities, with rice—a staple food—becoming a symbol of economic hardship.

Media coverage extensively analyzed the balancing act between sustaining domestic agricultural production and ensuring affordable prices for consumers, with debates on whether direct payments to farmers, price guarantees, or productivity improvements would be most effective. The issue became a significant election topic, influencing party platforms and voter concerns during the 2025 Upper House elections.

=== Taxes ===
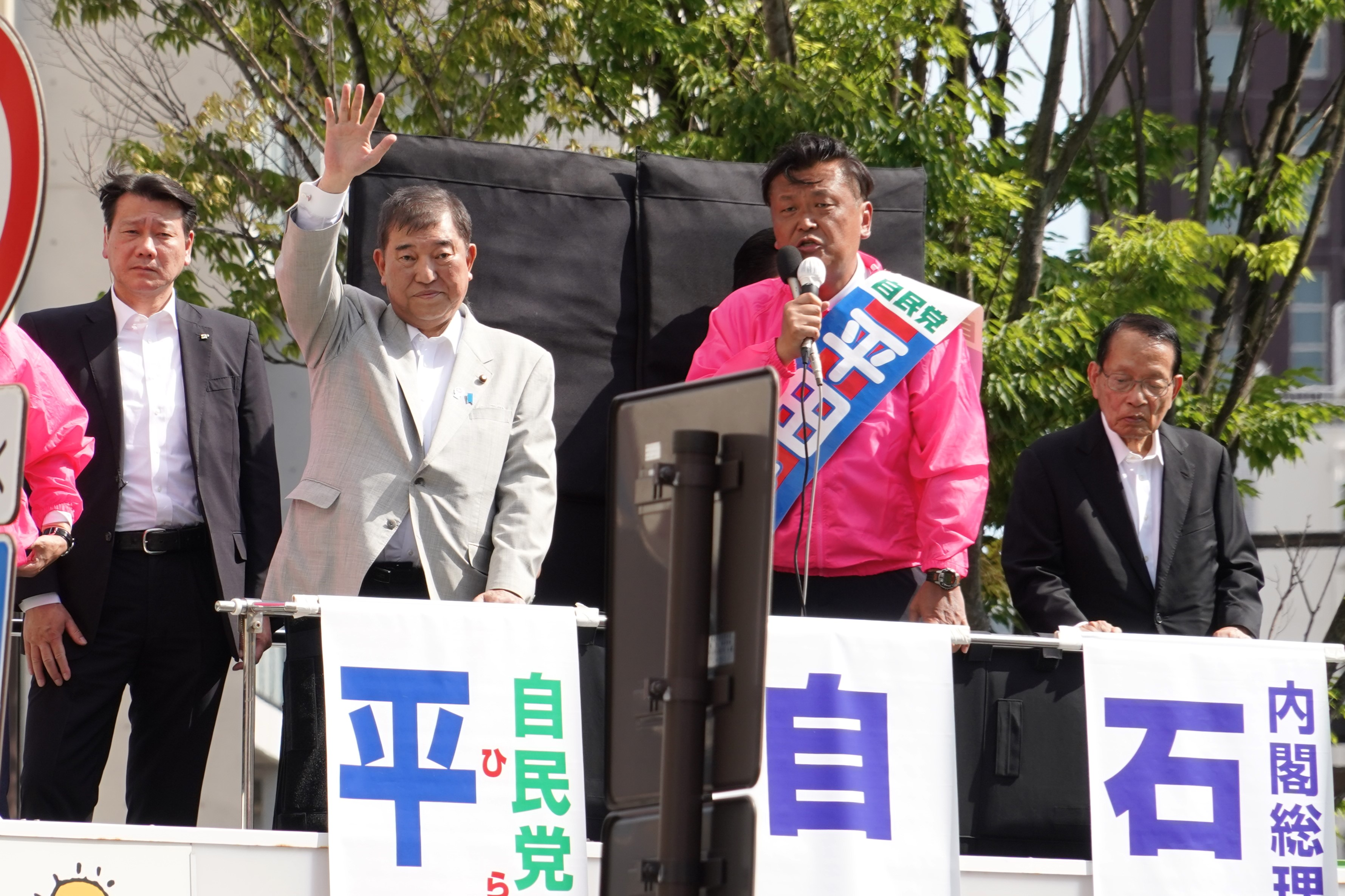
Shigeru Ishiba campaigning with Mitsuyoshi Hirata in June 2025.

The LDP adopted a cautious approach toward tax cuts during the election. The party stressed fiscal responsibility, warning that cutting the consumption tax could jeopardize funding for crucial social security and welfare programs. Instead of reducing the tax rate, the LDP proposed direct cash handouts and wage increases to help households cope with rising living expenses. A survey conducted ahead of the election showed that 26% of LDP candidates supported a consumption tax cut despite the party leadership's official opposition, revealing some internal division on the issue.

The CDP called for a temporary reduction of the consumption tax rate on food and other essentials to 0% for one year, with the option to extend the measure for up to two years. They proposed financing this policy through accumulated fiscal reserves and special tax measures rather than increasing government debt via deficit bonds. Additionally, the CDP pledged to distribute ¥20,000 per person to support livelihoods and sought to protect the agriculture, forestry, and fisheries sectors by maintaining and increasing subsidies.

The DPP pushed for a permanent cut of the consumption tax rate from 10% to 5%. It also sought to raise the minimum taxable income threshold from ¥1.03 million to ¥1.78 million and proposed abolishing the provisional gasoline tax surcharge, measures intended to boost disposable income and ease financial pressures on households.

Ishin proposed eliminating the consumption tax on food items temporarily until March 2027, balancing immediate relief for middle-class households with longer-term fiscal sustainability. The party emphasized the importance of reducing the financial burden on consumers while maintaining a disciplined approach to government spending.

Komeito, the LDP's junior coalition partner, proposed raising the minimum taxable income threshold from ¥1.03 million to ¥1.6 million, aiming to grant tax relief to 99% of taxpayers with cuts ranging from ¥20,000 to ¥40,000. Their platform combined targeted tax cuts with direct cash payments, such as "living support benefits" and "living support tax cuts," to ease the financial pressures on households.

The SDP called for the complete abolition of the consumption tax, particularly on food products. It also promised wage increases for care workers, the suspension of all nuclear power plants, legislation allowing married couples to choose separate surnames, and ratification of the Treaty on the Prohibition of Nuclear Weapons. These proposals aimed to address broader social welfare concerns alongside tax reform.

The JCP also advocated for the abolition of the consumption tax, emphasizing comprehensive tax reforms to redistribute wealth and relieve financial burdens on low-income households.

The NHK Party focused on cutting what it called wasteful government spending, supporting broad tax reductions including a consumption tax cut. It emphasized fiscal conservatism and the need for efficient government expenditure to foster economic stability.

=== Social issues ===
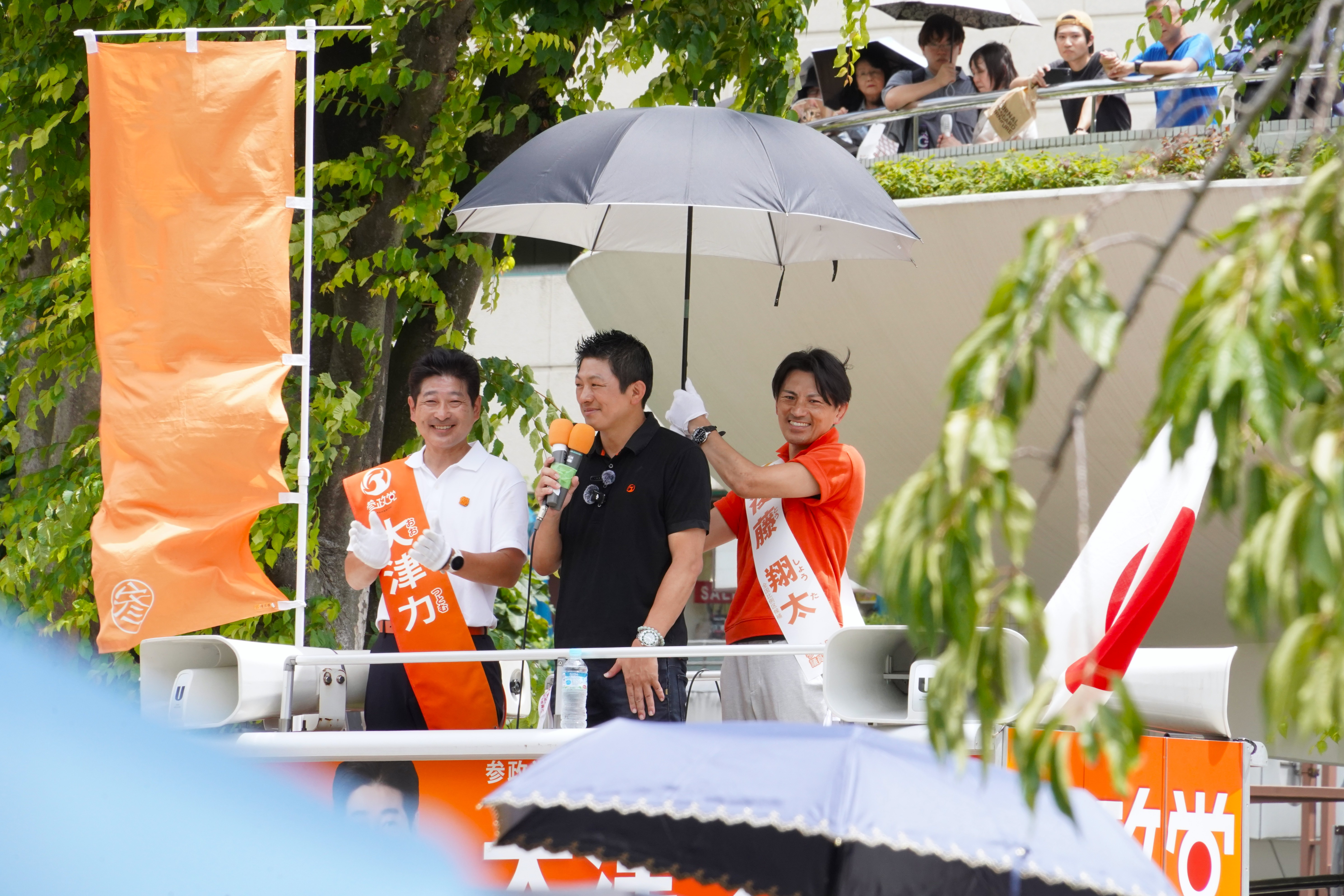
Sanseito leader Sohei Kamiya delivering a speech near Kannonzaki Park.

During the election, several social issues dominated public discourse, reflecting widespread concern over the country's shifting demographics and social fabric. The most urgent among these was the challenge posed by Japan's rapidly aging population and declining birth rate. Voters widely supported calls for expanding social welfare programs, particularly in healthcare and pension systems, to better serve the growing elderly demographic. There was also significant public backing for policies designed to encourage family growth, such as more accessible and affordable child care, extended parental leave, and financial incentives for child-rearing. These measures were seen as critical to counteracting the demographic crisis threatening Japan's economic stability and social services.

In tandem with demographic concerns, gender equality and LGBTQ+ rights gained unprecedented attention during the campaign. There was a growing public demand for comprehensive legislation to address workplace discrimination, close persistent gender pay gaps, and provide legal recognition and protections for LGBTQ+ communities. Activists and younger voters especially pushed for reforms such as anti-harassment laws, diversity training in workplaces, and inclusive education policies. This shift in societal attitudes was viewed by many analysts as part of a broader cultural evolution challenging Japan's traditionally conservative social norms.

Public health policy remained a contentious issue, especially concerning COVID-19 responses. While a segment of the population favored continued government mandates, including vaccination campaigns and mask usage, others voiced strong opposition on the grounds of personal freedom and government overreach. This polarization highlighted deep divisions within Japanese society about the balance between collective health safety and individual liberties. Some candidates tailored their platforms accordingly, appealing either to those prioritizing strict public health measures or to voters skeptical of state intervention.

National security and immigration policies also featured prominently in election debates. The rise of conservative nationalist parties underscored public concerns about maintaining Japan's cultural identity and sovereignty amidst geopolitical tensions in East Asia. These parties advocated for stricter immigration controls and increased defense spending. Conversely, other factions and segments of the electorate supported more open immigration policies, arguing that Japan must embrace multiculturalism to address labor shortages and sustain economic growth. These contrasting views mirrored broader societal tensions between preservation of tradition and adaptation to globalization.

Environmental concerns, while not as dominant as social welfare or security, also attracted voter interest, especially among younger demographics. Climate change policies, renewable energy initiatives, and disaster preparedness were raised as important topics. Public opinion indicated increasing expectations that elected officials prioritize sustainable development alongside economic growth.

The election illuminated a Japan in transition, where voters grappled with balancing long-standing cultural traditions against pressing demographic, social, and global challenges. There was a clear desire for pragmatic, forward-looking policies capable of addressing complex social dynamics, including support for an aging population, social inclusiveness, public health resilience, and national security. The diversity of issues and public opinion underscored the multifaceted nature of Japan's social landscape and the critical role of elected officials in shaping its future.

=== Immigration ===
During the election campaign, several parties presented contrasting visions regarding immigration. Conservative and nationalist parties, such as Ishin and Sanseito, emphasized the importance of protecting Japanese culture and values. They advocated for maintaining tight controls on immigration, expressing concerns over potential social disruption and challenges in assimilation. These parties campaigned on promises to strengthen border security, reduce the number of new foreign workers, and prioritize Japanese citizens in employment and social benefits.

== Seats up for election ==
124 seats were up for their regularly scheduled election. However, in the Tokyo constituency, one non-reelection seat was filled (for a merged election; term of office is three years), bringing the number of seats up for election in Tokyo to seven, and the total number of seats up for election to 125.

- 124+1:
  - House of Councillors electoral districts: 74+1
  - National proportional representation block: 50

Number of seats up for election in each electoral district

== Campaign ==
=== Third anniversary of the assassination of Shinzo Abe ===
On 8 July 2025, the third anniversary of the assassination of Shinzo Abe culminated in anti-government protests and riots, with the suspect to go on trial in October in a case that shed light on ruling lawmakers' links to the controversial Unification Church. The Mainichi Shimbun reported that Prime Minister Ishiba laid bouquets at the memorial, and a floral tribute stand was set up in front of Yamato-Saidaiji Station in Nara, where the incident occurred. Campaigning officially began on 3 July, although a debate hosted by the Japan National Press Club between the party leaders had already been held the day earlier.

The far-right Sanseitō Party had rapidly risen in opinion polls, which was a detriment to the ruling conservative LDP and the more centrist-leaning DPFP. Promises of tax cuts, wage rises, and increased benefits dominated the early stages of the campaign.

== Debate ==
The only debate was hosted by the Japan National Press Club on 2 July. The leaders of the Conservatives and the Social Democrats were not invited.

2024 Japanese general election debates
Date	Host	Format	Venue	P Present; I Invited; S Surrogate; NI Not invited; A Absent; N No debate								
Date	Host	Format	Venue	LDP	CDP	Ishin	Komei	JCP	DPP	Reiwa	SDP	Sansei
2 July	Japan National Press Club	Debate	Japan National Press Club, Tokyo	P Ishiba	P Noda	P Yoshimura	P Saito	P Tamura	P Tamaki	P Yamamoto	NI	P Kamiya

== Opinion polls ==
=== Proportional voting intention ===
Fieldwork date	Polling firm	Sample size	LDP	CDP	Ishin	DPP	Komei	Reiwa	JCP	Sansei	CPJ	SDP	Others	None/Und.	No ans.	Lead
20 Jul 2025	Election results	58.51% (Note: Election turnout.)	21.6	12.5	7.4	12.9	8.8	6.6	4.8	12.5	5	2.1	5.8 (Note: Team Mirai: 2.6%; Others: 3.2%)	–		8.7
12–13 Jul 2025	Senkyo.com/JX	991	28.6	19.5	6.3	5.5	5.8	3.6	5.2	8.4	3.1	2.5	2.5	8.9	–	9.1
5–6 Jul 2025	ANN	1,048	23.6	11	4.2	5.4	5.6	2.4	4.1	6.2	1.4	0.4	1.7 (Note: NHK Party: 0.3%; Others: 1.4%)	19	14.9	4.6
5–6 Jul 2025	Kyodo News (Note: Trend Survey)	1,253	18.2	6.6	3.4	6.8	5	3.7	2.5	8.1	2.5	0.9	0.7	40.8 (Note: Undecided: 37%; None: 3.8%)	0.8	22.6
5–6 Jul 2025	JNN	1,010	25	12	6	8	5	6	3	9	2	1	5	19		6
28–29 Jun 2025	Kyodo News	1,254	17.9	9.8	2.5	6.4	3.6	3.4	2.7	5.8	1.1	0.8	0.6 (Note: The Collaborative Party: 0.1%; Others: 0.5%)	44.4 (Note: Undecided: 40.3%; None: 4.1%)	1	24.5
28–29 Jun 2025	Mainichi/SSRC	2,050	18	11	4	10	3	4	3	7	2	1	1	36	–	18
27–29 Jun 2025	Nikkei/TV Tokyo	775	29	12	6	12	5	5	3	7	2	1	–	12	8	17
27–29 Jun 2025	Yomiuri/NNN	1,061	24	11	5	9	5	4	5	6	1	0	1	23	8	1
26–27 Jun 2025	Agricultural News		35	13.5	1	5.8	1.7	3.3	3.9	1.4	1	1.3	0.7	30.7	0.7	4.3
21–22 Jun 2025	ANN	1,031	22	10.7	3.4	7.5	4.2	5.1	4.2	3.3	0.9	0.6	0.8 (Note: NHK Party: 0.1%; Others: 0.7%)	37.3 (Note: Undecided/no answer: 35.8%; None: 1.5%)		15.3
21–22 Jun 2025	Kyodo News	1,050	26.7	11.1	4.8	10.6	5.1	6.8	3.1	4.3	1.8	1.6	0.4 (Note: The Collaborative Party: 0.2%; Others: 0.2%)	23.7		3
13–16 Jun 2025	Jiji Press	1,162	24.5	8.3	4.4	6	4	3.1	2.2	3.5	0.7	0.5	–	42.8		18.3
14–15 Jun 2025	Sankei/FNN	1,027	24.5	9.6	3.8	8.8	4.1	4.1	3	3.6	1.2	0.2	0.7	36.4 (Note: Undecided/no answer: 31.4%; None: 5%)		11.9
14–15 Jun 2025	Asahi	1,256	26	12	7	10	5	7	4	4	1	1	2	21		5
14–15 Jun 2025	Senkyo.com/JX	990	30.4	18.8	5.6	7.4	4.7	3.8	5.9	3.1	3.2	1.1	1.8 (Note: The Collaborative Party: 0.1%; Others: 1.7%)	14.1	–	11.6
14–15 Jun 2025	Kyodo News	1,049	25.9	9.2	5.1	11.5	3.7	4.3	3.2	4.3	2	1.1	1.3 (Note: The Collaborative Party: 1.1%; Others: 0.2%)	28.4		2.5
7–8 Jun 2025	ANN	1,025	26.2	9.8	4.6	6.9	5.1	2.9	3.4	2.3	0.7	0.5	1	36.4 (Note: Undecided/no answer: 32.1%; None: 4.3%)		10.2
24–25 May 2025	Kyodo News	1,064	28.6	13.6	6.3	14.3	4.4	5.2	2.3	2.6	1.6	1	0.7 (Note: The Collaborative Party: 0.3%; Others: 0.4%)	19.4		9.2
23–25 May 2025	Nikkei/TV Tokyo	892	26	12	7	12	5	7	2	3	2	0	–	14	8	12
16–19 May 2025	Jiji Press	1,176	19.7	9.4	4.1	11.2	4.4	3.7	1.7	2	0.9	0.7	–	42.2		22.5
17–18 May 2025	Sankei/FNN	1,025	23.5	8.3	3.8	11.4	4.4	4.1	3.2	1.7	0.9	0.6	0.7	37.4 (Note: Undecided/no answer: 29.1%; None: 8.3%)		13.9
17–18 May 2025	Asahi	1,209	26	13	6	13	5	7	4	3	2	1	3	17		9
17–18 May 2025	Senkyo.com/JX	986	25.8	19.2	6	10.9	5.5	3	6	2.1	2.6	1.3	2.1 (Note: The Collaborative Party: 0.3%; Others: 1.8%)	15.4	–	6.6
17–18 May 2025	Kyodo News	1,064	20.2	14.2	6	12.4	5.7	5.9	3.8	2.4	1.2	1.3	0.7 (Note: The Collaborative Party: 0.4%; Others: 0.3%)	26.2		6
17–18 May 2025	Mainichi/SSRC	2,045	15	10	4	14	3	5	3	3	2	1	1	41	–	25
16–18 May 2025	Yomiuri/NNN	1,072	26	10	6	14	4	7	2	2	1	1	–	22	5	4
10–11 May 2025	ANN	1,016	25.8	8.9	2.9	10.6	4	3.9	2.7	0.8	1	0.8	1	37.6 (Note: Undecided/no answer: 33.9%; None: 3.7%)		11.8
3–4 May 2025	JNN	1,026	26	11	9	15	6	7	3	2	1	1	4	16		10
19–21 Apr 2025	Nikkei/TV Tokyo	799	29	14	6	15	4	6	3	1	2	1	–	12	7	14
19–20 Apr 2025	Sankei/FNN	1,015	23.7	8.8	3.8	13.3	2.9	2.9	2.8	1.7	1	0.6	0.9	37.8 (Note: Undecided/no answer: 31.6%; None: 6.2%)		14.1
19–20 Apr 2025	Asahi	1,240	23	12	7	17	4	7	5	2	1	1	2	19		4
19–20 Apr 2025	ANN	1,030	27.2	10.6	3.6	11.8	3.5	3	3.4	0.5	0.9	1.6	1.1	32.9 (Note: Undecided/no answer: 29.5%; None: 3.4%)		5.7
11–14 Apr 2025	Jiji Press	1,140	20.6	7.8	4.9	10.6	4.3	5.6	1.8	1.6	0.9	0.6	–	41.3		20.7
12–13 Apr 2025	Senkyo.com/JX	995	25.3	16.6	7.9	11.6	5	4.5	6.6	1.6	1.4	1.1	3.5 (Note: The Collaborative Party: 0.5%; Others: 3%)	14.8	–	8.7
12–13 Apr 2025	Kyodo News	1,051	24.6	12.3	3.9	18.5	3.9	4.1	3.2	1	1.7	0.8	–	26		1.4
12–13 Apr 2025	Mainichi/SSRC	2,040	16	11	4	16	3	5	3	1	1	1	–	38	–	22
11–13 Apr 2025	Yomiuri/NNN	1,026	27	10	5	15	4	6	4	1	2	0	–	19	7	8
22–23 Mar 2025	Sankei/FNN	1,013	19.3	8.5	3.2	12	2.6	5.3	2.6	1	0.9	0.4	–	44.2 (Note: Undecided/no answer: 36.6%; None: 7.6%)		24.9
22–23 Mar 2025	ANN	1,025	24.1	11.1	4.6	11.2	3.2	3.6	3.9	0.5	1.3	0.3	0.5	35.7 (Note: Undecided/no answer: 33.1%; None: 2.6%)		11.6
22–23 Mar 2025	Kyodo News	1,046	24.3	12.5	6.4	13.4	4.1	7.3	3.6	1.2	0.3	1.1	0.4 (Note: The Collaborative Party: 0.1%; Others: 0.3%)	25.4		1.1
21–23 Mar 2025	Nikkei/TV Tokyo	847	29	13	9	14	3	8	3	1	1	0	1	11	8	18
15–16 Mar 2025	Senkyo.com/JX	998	23.7	20.6	6.2	13.9	4.4	3.4	6.8	1.2	1.7	1.3	2.4	14.2	–	3.1
15–16 Mar 2025	Asahi	1,137	24	12	7	17	5	7	3	1	2	1	3	19		5
15–16 Mar 2025	Mainichi/SSRC	2,047	16	13	5	17	2	5	2	1	1	0	1	38	–	21
14–16 Mar 2025	Yomiuri/NNN	1,023	25	11	6	17	4	5	3	1	1	0	0	20	6	5
22–23 Feb 2025	ANN	1,034	23.6	10.7	6.2	9.6	5.2	3.7	3.6	1	0.4	0.8	0.8	34.4 (Note: Undecided/no answer: 31%; None: 3.4%)		10.8
21–23 Feb 2025	Nikkei/TV Tokyo	847	29	13	7	14	4	8	3	1	1	0	1 (Note: The Collaborative Party: 1%)	10	9	15
15–16 Feb 2025	Senkyo.com/JX	1,004	25.7	20.8	8.3	9.8	4.2	4.6	5.6	0.6	2.2	1.5	2.3 (Note: The Collaborative Party: 0.4%; Others: 1.9%)	14.5	–	4.9
15–16 Feb 2025	Asahi	1,111	26	11	5	16	5	9	4	2	2	1	1	18		8
15–16 Feb 2025	Kyodo News	1,063	24.9	11.3	6.8	11.5	3.5	5.9	2.5	1.8	1.9	0.5	0.7 (Note: The Collaborative Party: 0.5%; Others: 0.2%)	28.7		3.8
15–16 Feb 2025	Mainichi/SSRC	2,043	16	11	5	15	3	5	2	0	2	0	–	38	3	22
6–9 Feb 2025	Jiji Press	1,126	22	9.7	3.6	10.2	5.1	3.5	2.5	1.3	0.4	0.4	–	40.2		18.2
25–26 Jan 2025	Kyodo News	1,064	26	12.9	5.8	14.9	3.8	4.4	4.1	1	1.4	0.3	0.4 (Note: The Collaborative Party: 0.1%; Others: 0.3%)	25		1
24–26 Jan 2025	Nikkei/TV Tokyo	946	32	13	8	15	3	5	3	2	2	1	–	11	8	17
18–19 Jan 2025	Asahi	1,103	25	15	8	15	6	6	3	1	1	2	2	16		9
18–19 Jan 2025	Mainichi/SSRC	2,042	17	14	6	16	2	4	2	1	2	0	1	35	–	18
11–12 Jan 2025	Senkyo.com/JX	996	27	21.2	8	8.8	4.5	4.2	7	1.3	2.2	0.8	2 (Note: The Collaborative Party: 0.2%; Others: 1.8%)	12.9	–	5.8
14–15 Dec 2024	Senkyo.com/JX	996	23.8	22.7	9.1	10.3	4.5	2.7	5.3	1.5	2	1.5	1.3 (Note: The Collaborative Party: 0.3%; Others: 1.0%)	15.2	–	1.1
16–17 Nov 2024	Senkyo.com/JX	1,003	26.3	21.0	7.8	10.8	5.3	2.7	6.4	1.9	2.6	0.7	2.1 (Note: The Collaborative Party: 0.7%; Others: 1.4%)	12.5	–	5.3
27 Oct 2024	HoR election	53.84%	26.7	21.2	9.4	11.3	10.9	7	6.2	3.4	2.1	1.7	–	–	–	5.5

=== Voting intention (district vote) ===
Fieldwork date	Polling firm	Sample size	Government	Opposition	Others	None/Und.	No ans.	Lead
5–6 Jul 2025	Kyodo News	1,253	20.5	36.6	–	41.8	1.1	5.2
28–29 Jun 2025	Kyodo News	1,254	19.9	32.6	–	46.3	1.2	13.7

=== Seat projections ===
Color key: Exit poll

Seat projections from analysts (district seats + proportional representation)
Fieldwork date	Publication/ Newspapers	Analysts	LDP	CDP	Ishin	DPP	Komei	Reiwa	JCP	Sansei	CPJ	SDP	Ind./ Oth.	Gov.	Opp.	Gov. Majority
20 Jul 2025	Election results		39 (27+12)	22 (15+7)	7 (3+4)	17 (10+7)	8 (4+4)	3 (0+3)	3 (1+2)	14 (7+7)	2 (0+2)	1 (0+1)	9 (Note: Team Mirai: 1 (0+1) seat; Independents: 8 (8+0) seats) (8+1)	47	78	-31
20 Jul 2025	NHK		27–41	18–30	6–9	14–21	5–12	2–4	3–5	10–22	1–3	0–1	8–11 (Note: NHK Party: 0–1 seat; Team Mirai: 1–2 seats; Independents: 7–8 seats)	32–53	62–106	–
20 Jul 2025	JNN		33	26	7	17	8	3	3	16	2	1	9	41	84	–43
17 Jul 2025	FNN		~30	~30	5–8	>16	<13	3	3-6	~20	1–3	0–1	–	~43	~84	–41
15 Jul 2025	Sankei Shimbun	Takashi Arimoto	33	28	7	14	10	3	5	14	2	1	8	43	82	–39
12–15 Jul 2025	Yomiuri		24–39	24–32	3–9	12–25	7–13	2–5	2–5	5–19	1–5	0–1	8–9	31–52	57-104	–
12–15 Jul 2025	NNN		~35	~30	–	>16	~10	>2	<7	>10	>1	>1	0	~45	67	–
13 Jul 2025	JNN		28–44	24–32	–	11–21	5–11	–	–	8–18	–	–	–	33–55	43–71	–
12–13 Jul 2025	Asahi		34	27	6	17	9	3	4	7	–	1	3	43	68	–25
3–4 Jul 2025	Asahi		32–46	23–33	5–9	9–17	4–10	3–5	3–4	9–17	1–2	0–1	8	36–56	61–96	–
3 Jul 2025	JNN		35–50	20–31	–	9–18	8–13	–	–	7–16	–	–	–	–	–	–
2 Jul 2025	Shūkan Bunshun	Masashi Kubota	35	30	7	19	11	3	5	4	0	0	11	46	79	–33
1 Jul 2025	AERA	Koichi Kakutani	45 (32+13)	24 (16+8)	9 (4+5)	12 (6+6)	13 (6+7)	5 (1+4)	7 (3+4)	2 (0+2)	1 (0+1)	0 (0+0)	7 (7+0)	58	67	–9
1 Jul 2025	AERA	Kazuhiro Aoyama	42 (28+14)	28 (18+10)	7 (4+3)	18 (11+7)	12 (6+6)	3 (0+3)	5 (1+4)	2 (0+2)	1 (0+1)	0 (0+0)	7 (7+0)	54	71	–17
30 Jun 2025	Rakumachi	Kunikazu Suzuki	36–43	25–31	5–8	16–20	10–13	3–4	4–5	3–5	0–1	0–1	6–9	46–56	62–84	–
7 Apr 2025	Weekly Post	Tadaoki Nogami	34 (21+13)	30 (21+9)	9 (5+4)	22 (12+10)	11 (6+5)	5 (1+4)	4 (1+3)	1 (0+1)	1 (0+1)	0 (0+0)	7 (7+0)	45	79	–34
10 Jul 2022	2022 Election		63	17	12	5	13	3	4	1	–	1	6	76	49	27

== Results ==
Party	National			Constituency			Seats			
Party	Votes	%	Seats	Votes	%	Seats	Won	Not up	Total after	+/–
Liberal Democratic Party	12,808,307	21.64	12	14,470,017	24.46	27	39	62	101	–13
Democratic Party For the People	7,620,493	12.88	7	7,180,653	12.14	10	17	5	22	+13
Sanseitō	7,425,054	12.55	7	9,264,284	15.66	7	14	1	15	+14
Constitutional Democratic Party	7,397,456	12.50	7	9,119,656	15.42	15	22	16	38	0
Komeito	5,210,569	8.80	4	3,175,791	5.37	4	8	13	21	–6
Japan Innovation Party	4,375,927	7.39	4	3,451,834	5.84	3	7	12	19	+1
Reiwa Shinsengumi	3,879,914	6.56	3	1,881,606	3.18	0	3	3	6	+1
Conservative Party of Japan	2,982,093	5.04	2	652,266	1.10	0	2	0	2	New
Japanese Communist Party	2,864,738	4.84	2	2,831,672	4.79	1	3	4	7	–4
Team Mirai	1,517,890	2.56	1	956,674	1.62	0	1	0	1	New
Social Democratic Party	1,217,823	2.06	1	302,775	0.51	0	1	1	2	0
NHK Party	682,626	1.15	0	740,740	1.25	0	0	1	1	–1
The Path to Rebirth	524,788	0.89	0	128,746	0.22	0	0	0	0	New
Japan Seishinkai	333,263	0.56	0	223,067	0.38	0	0	0	0	New
Independents Coalition	289,222	0.49	0	341,437	0.58	0	0	0	0	New
Japan Reform Party	55,232	0.09	0	74,274	0.13	0	0	0	0	New
Genzei Nippon				254,938	0.43	0	0	0	0	New
Conservative Party of Nippon				129,130	0.22	0	0	0	0	New
Association for the Protection of Japanese Families				23,686	0.04	0	0	0	0	New
Collaborative Party				6,292	0.01	0	0	0	0	New
Party for Tax Reduction				5,387	0.01	0	0	0	0	New
New Party Kunimori				4,832	0.01	0	0	0	0	New
New Party Yamato				3,885	0.01	0	0	0	0	New
Saigo Party				1,805	0.00	0	0	0	0	New
Nuclear Fusion Party				1,611	0.00	0	0	0	0	0
World Peace Party				1,494	0.00	0	0	0	0	New
Savior-Making Party				1,292	0.00	0	0	0	0	New
Independents				3,923,802	6.63	8	8	5	13	+1
Total	59,185,395	100.00	50	59,153,646	100.00	75	125	123	248	0
Valid votes	59,185,735	97.65		59,153,646	97.59					
Invalid/blank votes	1,422,497	2.35		1,460,129	2.41					
Total votes	60,608,232	100.00		60,613,775	100.00					
Registered voters/turnout	103,591,806	58.51		103,591,806	58.51					
Source: Ministry of Internal Affairs and Communications

=== By constituency ===
Constituency	Total seats	Seats won											
Constituency	Total seats	LDP	CDP	DPP	Sansei	Komei	Ishin	JCP	Reiwa	CPJ	Mirai	SDP	Ind.
Aichi	4	1	1	1	1								
Akita	1												1
Aomori	1		1										
Chiba	3	1	1	1									
Ehime	1												1
Fukui	1	1											
Fukuoka	3	1			1	1							
Fukushima	1	1											
Gifu	1	1											
Gunma	1	1											
Hiroshima	2	1	1										
Hokkaido	3	2	1										
Hyōgo	3	1				1							1
Ibaraki	2	1			1								
Ishikawa	1	1											
Iwate	1		1										
Kagawa	1			1									
Kagoshima	1												1
Kanagawa	4	1	1	1	1								
Kumamoto	1	1											
Kyoto	2	1					1						
Mie	1		1										
Miyagi	1		1										
Miyazaki	1		1										
Nagano	1		1										
Nagasaki	1	1											
Nara	1	1											
Niigata	1		1										
Ōita	1		1										
Okinawa	1												1
Okayama	1	1											
Osaka	4				1	1	2						
Saga	1	1											
Saitama	4	1	1	1	1								
Shiga	1	1											
Shizuoka	2	1		1									
Tochigi	1	1											
Tokushima–Kōchi	1												1
Tokyo	7	1	1	2	1	1		1					
Tottori–Shimane	1	1											
Toyama	1			1									
Wakayama	1												1
Yamagata	1												1
Yamaguchi	1	1											
Yamanashi	1			1									
National	50	12	7	7	7	4	4	2	3	2	1	1	
Total	125	39	22	17	14	8	7	3	3	2	1	1	8

== Aftermath ==
Following the election, the Conservative Party of Japan met both requirements (two seats, more than 5% votes in national elections) to become a party. The DPFP and Sanseito both saw their seats multiply as a result of the election. Ishiba expressed his intention to keep his position and not resign. A record 42 women were also elected to the chamber, which exceeded the 35 elected in 2020. However, their proportion in the chamber, which reached 29.1%, was less than the government's target of 35% for the election.

=== LDP ===
Shortly after the polls closed at 20:00 (JST) on 20 July 2025, members of the ruling LDP discussed whether Ishiba should remain as the head of the party, including former Prime Minister and current LDP lawmaker Tarō Asō, whom proclaimed he "couldn't accept" Ishiba remaining as prime minister.

Ishiba said in a post-election press conference that the LDP "received an extremely harsh judgment from the people", and said the loss could be attributed to "political reform, inflation, [and] foreigner-related issues" and a failure to "present sharp, impactful policies to the voters". Ishiba also said he felt "the grave responsibility for the results of this election", but had no plans to resign, saying he "must continue to fulfill my duties to the nation and its people so as not to bring politics to a standstill".

On 23 July 2025, the Mainichi Shimbun and the Sankei Shimbun reported that Ishiba planned to formally resign as Prime Minister and LDP President in late August, after the 80th Anniversary of the end of World War II. Jiji reported that an unnamed senior LDP leadership member indicated that Ishiba would step down after the party conducted its review of the election results in August. However, Ishiba denied the reports on the same day during a press conference at LDP Headquarters. Ishiba later announced his resignation as LDP President on 7 September 2025, triggering a snap leadership election.

=== CDP ===
At a press conference on July 21, CDP leader Yoshihiko Noda expressed his appreciation to supporters after what he described as "17 days of intense campaigning." He highlighted the 18 victories in single-member districts as a result of effective opposition coordination, and stated that the electorate had clearly voiced its discontent with the ruling party. Moving forward, he pledged to work with other parties to realize concrete policy proposals, including the abolition of the provisional gasoline tax, and said: "Based on the premise that we have actual power as the second largest party in the House of Representatives and the Senate, we will call on other opposition parties to unite".

Regarding rumors that Prime Minister Ishiba may resign, Noda told the media on July 23 that if Ishiba could clearly specify a resignation timeline, "discussions between opposition parties could proceed more swiftly."

On 30 July, after inspecting drought-affected rice paddies in Niigata Prefecture, Noda stated that if there were to be calls for Ishiba’s resignation, "Deputy Minister of Agriculture, Forestry and Fisheries Hiroyoshi Sasagawa should step down first." He criticized the LDP for focusing on internal political struggles while neglecting real issues affecting citizens. Noda stressed that political parties should prioritize disaster response and public livelihood over political infighting at this time.

=== DPP ===
At the vote-counting press conference on the evening of July 21, 2025, DPP leader Yuichiro Tamaki announced that the party had secured 16 seats in the election. Including seats not up for re-election, the party now holds 21 seats—enough to propose budget legislation in the Upper House.

Tamaki noted that voters widely hoped for higher take-home pay. However, policies such as raising income deduction thresholds and abolishing the temporary gasoline tax—previously agreed upon—were never implemented. Instead, the government opted for one-time cash handouts, revealing a policy imbalance.

Tamaki emphasized that the DPP had positioned itself as an alternative to both the LDP and the CDP, appealing particularly to working-age and younger voters by advocating pragmatic centrist reform. He stated, "Regardless of party affiliation, we will work with any group that shares policy goals. What matters is not who we work with, but what we can achieve."

On 22 July, Tamaki announced that the DPP had ultimately secured 17 seats, making it the third-largest party in the Upper House. He pledged to fully implement the party’s campaign pledges and respond to the expectations of the electorate.

Amid growing calls for Prime Minister Ishiba to resign following the election, Tamaki stated in a Diet interview that he could not understand Ishiba’s insistence on staying in office, likening it to a denial of the election outcome. He criticized the administration for failing to honor policy agreements made with the DPP and for decision-making that was overly insular and disconnected from public opinion. Tamaki firmly declared, "We will not cooperate with a government that breaks its promises."

=== Komeito ===
On 21 July, following the close of polling, Komeito leader Saito acknowledged at a press conference at party headquarters that the party had failed to retain its 14 seats as hoped. He expressed a strong sense of responsibility for the results and stated that a comprehensive review of campaign strategies and grassroots mobilization was necessary. He did not indicate whether he intended to remain in his position.

At an internal party meeting on July 24, Saito issued another public apology, admitting responsibility for the loss of capable individuals within the party. He pledged to initiate nationwide consultations and gather wide-ranging input from party members to advance internal reforms and rebuild what he called a “renewed Komeito.”

At a Komeito executive meeting on July 31, Saito announced that a full review of the election outcome would be completed by August, with the party’s revival plan to be presented in September.

After meeting with Prime Minister Ishiba on 21 July, Saito stated that from the perspective of addressing national crises, Komeito hoped to continue its cooperation with the Ishiba administration. He emphasized the importance of working with the Liberal Democratic Party to realize Komeito’s priority policy of scholarship tax relief in the upper house elections. "We hope the LDP will act as a true coalition partner in achieving this," he said, reaffirming Komeito’s intention to remain part of the governing alliance, especially in matters of policy and international negotiations.

Responding to internal LDP speculation about Ishiba’s resignation, Saito stated at a 25 July press conference that the LDP should form a unified structure to support Ishiba and push forward in negotiations with the United States on tariffs. As cross-party talks on U.S.-Japan trade continued, he called for Ishiba to meet directly with President Trump to finalize an agreement.

=== Ishin ===
At a press conference at the Osaka ballot center on 20 July 2025, Ishin leader Hirofumi Yoshimura acknowledged that aside from retaining two seats in Osaka, the party's nationwide performance was “severe,” signaling the need for broad organizational rebuilding. In a media interview the following day, he denied forming any alliance with the Constitutional Democratic Party (CDP) but called for swift cooperation with other opposition forces to advance concrete legislative proposals, such as abolishing the temporary gasoline tax.

On 31 July, during a general meeting of Ishin lawmakers from both houses, co-leader Seiji Maehara announced that he had formally submitted his resignation to fellow co-leader Yoshimura, following the party’s disappointing result of securing only seven seats. He stated that a comprehensive post-election report would be delivered in mid-August. Maehara stressed the importance of strengthening policy coordination among opposition forces and exploring new coalition frameworks, given the loss of majority representation in the Upper House. Taking full responsibility for the party’s poor performance, he pledged to review internal policies and organizational structures to better prepare for future challenges.

Yoshimura responded firmly to questions about party leadership, stating that he had no intention of immediately stepping down. He added that any decision on holding a leadership election would be made through electronic voting.

Responding to speculation about Prime Minister Ishiba’s possible resignation, Yoshimura told the media in Osaka that while the decision ultimately rests with Ishiba himself, “the LDP has failed to secure a majority in both the Lower and Upper Houses, and growing calls within the party for his resignation indicate that this administration has lost its ability to govern effectively.” He added, “A ruling party that has lost policy-driving capacity no longer serves the public interest.” Yoshimura reaffirmed that the Japan Innovation Party would not join a coalition with the Ishiba government and would instead adopt a case-by-case policy stance to ensure the realization of its campaign promises.

Co-leader Maehara, speaking on the BS Japan program Live Report: Inside and Out, stated that Ishiba had suffered consecutive defeats in the Lower House, Tokyo Metropolitan, and Upper House elections. He said Ishiba had acquired a reputation as “unelectable” and lacked cohesion within his party, making it difficult for him to continue in office. Maehara urged him to resign promptly. He also affirmed that he and Yoshimura had agreed not to form any kind of coalition with the Ishiba administration.

=== Sanseitō ===
On the evening of 20 July 2025, following the preliminary election results, Sanseitō leader Sohei Kamiya delivered a street speech in front of Shimbashi Station in Tokyo. He expressed his strong commitment to party expansion, stating that a team would be formed in preparation for a potential "dissolution" election. He emphasized that the next priority would be to strengthen the party’s foundation and support network to sustain further growth.

In a post-election television interview, Kamiya analyzed the reasons behind the party’s success. He attributed the results to the party’s core message of "Japan First," combined with economic policies such as tax reduction and proactive fiscal spending, which resonated strongly with unaffiliated voters—particularly in urban areas. He also stated that he would not rule out potential cooperation with parties like the DPP or Reiwa Shinsengumi on fiscal issues, emphasizing that any discussions would be based on substantive policy alignment.

At a regular press conference held on 22 July, Kamiya expressed his sincere gratitude for the party’s historic growth from one to 14 seats, stating that the result far exceeded internal expectations and reflected the dedication of its supporters. He attributed the electoral success to the public’s strong resonance with the party’s “Japan First” stance and its platform of tax cuts and proactive fiscal policy. Kamiya also announced plans to begin a comprehensive internal review of party policies and organization to ensure the sustained growth of its political influence.

Commenting on the possibility of Ishiba's resignation, Kamiya stated, "I believe resigning is one way of taking responsibility." He acknowledged, however, that differing views within the LDP were to be expected, saying, "I think such internal disagreements are normal." When asked what Ishiba might have lacked, Kamiya responded, "He had a consistent follow-through on his promises," but added, "I don’t really know what has changed between the Kishida administration and the Ishiba administration."
