= 2023 Osaka City Council election =

Results of 2023 election in Osaka, Japan

← 2019	April 9, 2023	2027 →
- All 81 seats in the Osaka City Council; 41 seats needed for a majority
Party	Leader	Vote %	Seats	+/–
One Osaka	Hirofumi Yoshimura		46	+6
Komeito	Shigeki Sato		18	0
LDP	Koichi Munekiyo		11	−3
JCP			2	−2
This lists parties that won seats. See the complete results below.
Mayor of Osaka before	Mayor of Osaka after
Ichirō Matsui; One Osaka	Hideyuki Yokoyama; One Osaka

The 2023 Osaka City Council election was held following the expiration of the council's four-year term on 9 April 2023, marking the first half of the 20th national unified elections. There were 128 candidates running for 81 seats in the city's 24 wards (each Osaka city ward is one electoral district). The political parties contesting the election were: Osaka Ishin, Komeito, Liberal Democratic Party (LDP), Japan Communist Party (JCP), Constitutional Democratic Party (CDP), and the Reiwa Shinsengumi (Reiwa).

== Background ==
On 10 February 2023, an ordinance was passed to reduce the number of seats for Nishinari Ward from four to three, and for Minato Wards from three to two

Including the governor and assembly race for Osaka Prefecture and the Osaka mayoral election on the same day, this was a "quadruple election" for the citizens of Osaka City.

- Election called: 30 March 2023
- Elect date: 9 April 2023
- Number of council seats: 81
- Number of constituencies (wards): 24
- Number of candidates: 125

== Candidates ==
Number of candidates by party affiliation
Party	Total	Current Councillors	Past Councillors	New
Osaka Ishin	50	35	0	15
Komeito	19	16	0	3
LDP	19	10	2	7
JCP	16	3	5	8
CDP	1	0	0	1
Reiwa	2	0	0	2
Ind.	18	4	2	12
Totals	125	68	9	48

== Results ==
=== City Wide Results ===
Party	Total	Re-elected	Past	New	Last Election	+/-
Osaka Ishin	46	34	0	12	40	6 up
Komeito	18	16	0	2	18	0
LDP	11	5	1	5	14	3 up
JCP	2	2	0	0	4	2 down
CDP	0	0	0	0	0	0
Reiwa	0	0	0	0	0	0
Ind.	4	4	0	0	4	0
Totals	81	61	1	19	83	

=== Ward-by Results ===
WARD	Osaka Ishin	Komeito	LDP	JCP	Ind.
Kita Ward	Takayama Mika	Yamamoto Tomoko	Maeda Kazuhiko		
	Kondo Dai				
Fukushima Ward	Hirota Kazumi		Ota Katsuki		
Chuo Ward	Nogami Ran		Suzuki Rie		
	Shionaka Issei				
Minato Ward	Fujita Akira	Nishi Norihito			
Tennoji Ward	Kaneko Emi		Sudo Shota		
Nishi Yodogawa Ward	Yamada Hajime	Sasaki Tetsuo			
	Yamada Kana				
Higashi Yodogawa Ward	Hashimoto Makoto	Mori Keigo	Ishikawa Hironori		
	Masumoto Saori				
	Iwaiki Takayo				
Ikuno Ward	Kinoshita Makoto	Yamada Masakazu			Take Naoki
	Haraguchi Yusuke				
Joto Ward	Baba Noriyuki	Akashi Naoki		Yamanaka Tomoko	
	Honda Rie				
	Washimi Shinichi				
Abeno Ward	Umezono Shu		Kinoshita Yoshinobu		
	Tani Masayoshi				
Sumiyoshi Ward	Ito Ami	Nakata Koichiro		Inoue Hiroshi	
	Kubota Ryo				
	Ueda Tomotaka				
Hirano Ward	Sugimura Kotaro	Nagai Hiroyuki	Tanaka Hiroki		
	Matsuda Masatoshi	Nagata Noriko			
	Yoshimi Misako				
Miyakojima Ward	Okada Takatomo		Araki Hajime		
	Ohnishi Seiichi				
Konohana Ward	Takechi Hiroyuki	Imada Nobuyuki			
Nishi Ward	Nishi Takanobu		Nagai Keisuke		
	Azuma Takayuki				
Taisho Ward	Izumo Teruhide	Koyama Mitsumasa			
Naniwa Ward	Takeshita Ryu				Moriyama Yoshihisa
Yodogawa Ward	Imamura Naoto	Sugita Tadahiro	Nan Takafumi		
	Sataka Riho				
	Sakai Hajime				
Higashinari Ward	Okazaki Futoshi	Tsukasa Takashi			
	Kondo Miwa				
Asahi Ward	Miyawaki Nozomi	Nishizaki Teruaki			Fukuda Takehiro
Tsurumi Ward	Kuroda Mariko	Tsuchioka Yasuo			
	Ohashi Kazutaka				
Suminoe Ward	Sasaki Rie	Kishimoto Sakae			Matsuzaki Kou
	Katayama Ippei				
Higashi Sumiyoshi Ward	Takami Ryo	Tsuji Yoshitaka	Fuchigami Hiromi		
	Tanabe Nobuhiro				
Nishinari Ward	Tsuji Junko		Yamaguchi Satoru		
	Fujio Hirokazu				
