= 2023 Osaka gubernatorial election =

2023 Osaka Prefecture Gubornatorial election candidates

- 9 April 2023

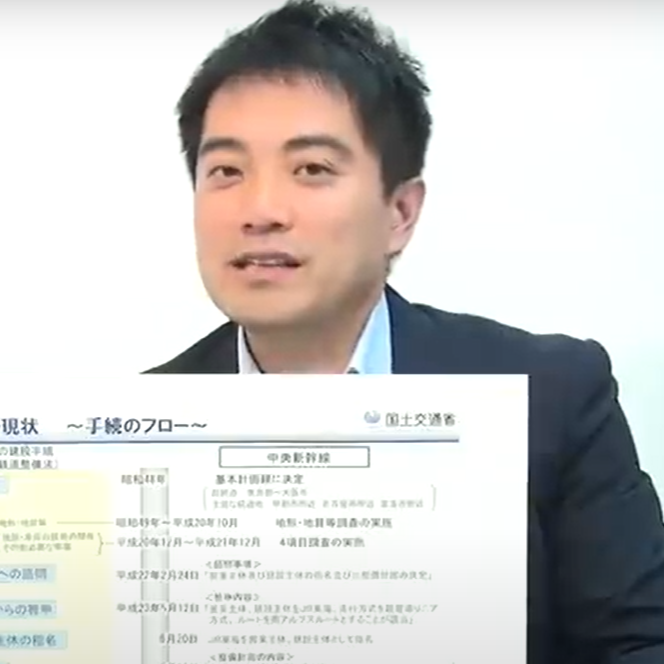
Candidate	Hirofumi Yoshimura	Taniguchi Mayumi	Kotaro Tatsumi
Party	One Osaka	Independent	Independent
Popular vote	2,439,444	437,972	263,355
Percentage	73.7%	13.2%	8%
Supported by	—	LDP, Komeito	JCP
Governor of Osaka Prefecture before election
Hirofumi Yoshimura
One Osaka
Elected Governor of Osaka Prefecture
Hirofumi Yoshimura
One Osaka

The 2023 Osaka Prefecture Gubernatorial election was held on 9 April 2023 as part of the 20th unified local elections. Incumbent Governor Hirofumi Yoshimura won re-election to a second term, defeating Taniguchi Mayumi who was supported by the Liberal Democratic Party, Constitutional Democratic Party and several minor candidates.

== Date of Public Notice / Date of Execution/Other info ==
Date of Official Announcement: 23 March 2023

Election Date: 9 April 2023

To be held in conjunction with elections for the Osaka City Assembly, and the Osaka Prefectural Gubernatorial and Prefectural Assembly.

=== Other Osaka Elections on 9 April ===
Osaka Prefectural Assembly, Osaka City Mayoral, Osaka City Council, Sakai City Council

== Declared Candidates ==
Name	Age	Affiliation	Occupation/Office
Yoshimura Hirofumi (incumbent)	47	Osaka Restoration Association(Ishin no Kai)	Governor of Osaka Prefecture (incumbent) Former Mayor of Osaka City Former member of the House of Representatives Representative of Osaka Restoration Association
Tatsumi Kotaro	46	Independent Supported by Japan Communist Party	Former member of the House of Councillors Central Committee Member of the Japanese Communist Party
Taniguchi Mayumi	47	Independent Supported by "Update Osaka"	Legal Scholar Visiting associate professor, Osaka University of Arts
Yoshino Toshiaki	55	Sanseito (Do-it-Yourself Party)	Dentist Political advisor to Sanseito
Inagaki Hideya	53	Shinto Kunimori (New Party Kunimori)	Writer
Sato Sayaka	34	Seijika Joshi 48 (Political Women 48)	Pharmacist

== Timeline ==
=== 2022. ===
- December 20 - Incumbent Yoshimura announces his candidacy for re-election at a meeting of the Osaka Restoration Association

=== 2023. ===
- January 7 - The "Association for Creating a Bright Democratic Osaka Prefecture", a citizens' group formed by the Japanese Communist Party and labor unions, announces that it will endorse Kotaro Tatsumi, a former member of the House of Councillors from the Japanese Communist Party. It was also announced that the JCP intends to endorse him. On the same day, Tatsumi announced his candidacy at a press conference.
- February 5 - It was reported that the political group "Update Osaka" planned to endorse Mayumi Taniguchi, a law scholar and visiting associate professor at Osaka University of Arts. On February 8, Taniguchi officially announced her candidacy
- February 21 - It was reported that the NHK Party was working on the candidacy of Sayaka Sato, a pharmacist
- February 24 - The Sangen Party announced the candidacy of Toshiaki Yoshino, a dentist
- February 27 - The political group New Party Kumori announced the candidacy of Hideya Inagaki, a writer
- February 27 - The NHK party announced that it would endorse Sato, but rescinded its endorsement of Sato the following day on February 28
- March 7 - Sato officially announced her candidacy at a press conference; on March 9, the Political Women 48 Party (formerly the NHK Party) announced it would endorse Sato
- April 9 - Election Held

== Election results ==
The election was held on 9 April and was won by the incumbent governor, Yoshimura Hirofumi of Osaka Ishin (Restoration) Party. 7,188,665 voters took part in the election (3,411,185 male voters and 3,777,480 female voters). Voter turnout was 46.98% down from 49.49% in the 2019 gubernatorial election.

=== Prefecture Wide Results ===
Candidate	Affiliation	Votes received	Notes
Yoshimura Hirohumi	Osaka Ishin (Restoration) Party	2,439,444	Incumbent and winner
Taniguchi Mayumi	Independent	437,972	Supported by Liberal Democratic Party and Constitutional Democratic Party
Tatsumi Kotaro	Independent	263,355	Supported by Japan Communist Party
Yoshino Toshiaki	Sanseito (Do-it-Yourself Party)	114,764	
Sato Sayaka	Seijika Joshi 48 (Political Women 48)	32,459	Originally established as the Anti-NHK Party until changing its name in March 2023. Has gone by numerous names in its history
Inagaki Hideya	Shinto Kunimori (New Party Kunimori)	22,367	

Election results from 選挙ドットコム

=== District by District Results ===
Name of voting district	Hirofumi Yoshimura		Mayumi Taniguchi		Kotaro Tatsumi		Toshiaki Yoshino		Sayaka Sato		Hideya Inagaki	
	Vote	%	Vote	%	Vote	%	Vote	%	Vote	%	Vote	%
Tsushima Ward, Osaka City	32,198.00	72.2	6,963.00	15.6	2,983.00	6.7	1,626.00	3.6	490	1.1	365	0.8
Fukushima Ward, Osaka City	22,384.00	73.6	4,066.00	13.4	2,251.00	7.4	1,103.00	3.6	361	1.2	247	0.8
Konohana-ku, Osaka City	17,706.00	68.9	2,888.00	11.2	3,941.00	15.3	709	2.8	259	1.0	185	0.7
Nishi Ward, Osaka City	26,250.00	72.9	4,831.00	13.4	2,329.00	6.5	1,800.00	5.0	446	1.2	338	0.9
Minato Ward Osaka City	22,279.00	70.5	4,977.00	15.7	2,537.00	8.0	1,121.00	3.5	439	1.4	258	0.8
Taisho Ward, Osaka City	17,720.00	70.7	3,588.00	14.3	2,435.00	9.7	803	3.2	363	1.4	168	0.7
Tennoji Ward, Osaka City	22,054.00	70.1	5,016.00	15.9	2,358.00	7.5	1,473.00	4.7	257	0.8	322	1.0
Naniwa-ku, Osaka City	12,041.00	68.6	2,843.00	16.2	1,362.00	7.8	811	4.6	286	1.6	210	1.2
Nishiyodogawa Ward, Osaka City	26,155.00	69.4	4,546.00	12.1	5,358.00	14.2	1,065.00	2.8	364	1.0	204	0.5
Higashiyodogawa Ward, Osaka City	45,530.00	72.5	8,853.00	14.1	4,730.00	7.5	2,385.00	3.8	745	1.2	533	0.8
Higashinari-ku, Osaka City	23,532.00	71.4	5,347.00	16.2	2,232.00	6.8	1,245.00	3.8	381	1.2	224	0.7
Ikuno Ward, Osaka City	27,055.00	69.0	7,151.00	18.2	2,937.00	7.5	1,249.00	3.2	507	1.3	296	0.8
Asahi-ku, Osaka	26,807.00	68.7	6,860.00	17.6	3,265.00	8.4	1,367.00	3.5	418	1.1	308	0.8
Joto-ku, Osaka City	51,658.00	71.5	11,427.00	15.8	5,563.00	7.7	2,316.00	3.2	813	1.1	496	0.7
Abeno Ward, Osaka City	32,429.00	67.7	9,054.00	18.9	3,820.00	8.0	1,795.00	3.7	373	0.8	411	0.9
Sumiyoshi Ward, Osaka City	42,616.00	69.4	9,970.00	16.2	5,523.00	9.0	2,108.00	3.4	747	1.2	420	0.7
Higashisumiyoshi Ward, Osaka City	36,858.00	70.8	8,396.00	16.1	3,969.00	7.6	1,777.00	3.4	617	1.2	455	0.9
Nishinari-ku, Osaka City	24,020.00	70.2	5,554.00	16.2	2,493.00	7.3	1,067.00	3.1	791	2.3	298	0.9
Yodogawa Ward, Osaka City	50,275.00	74.4	8,696.00	12.9	5,002.00	7.4	2,299.00	3.4	810	1.2	512	0.8
Tsurumi Ward, Osaka City	33,276.00	74.4	6,311.00	14.1	2,820.00	6.3	1,452.00	3.2	579	1.3	270	0.6
Suminoe-ku, Osaka City	34,930.00	71.4	7,759.00	15.9	3,655.00	7.5	1,549.00	3.2	698	1.4	351	0.7
Hirano Ward, Osaka City	52,590.00	71.6	11,512.00	15.7	5,415.00	7.4	2,381.00	3.2	1,031.00	1.4	526	0.7
Kita-ku, Osaka City	38,562.00	73.4	6,967.00	13.3	3,761.00	7.2	2,245.00	4.3	518	1.0	456	0.9
Chuo-ku, Osaka City	26,410.00	70.7	5,265.00	14.1	3,074.00	8.2	1,837.00	4.9	398	1.1	375	1.0
Osaka City	745,335.00	71.2	158,840.00	15.2	83,813.00	8.0	37,583.00	3.6	12,691.00	1.2	8,228.00	0.8
Sakai City Sakai Ward	39,505.00	71.6	7,920.00	14.4	5,064.00	9.2	1,755.00	3.2	562	1.0	361	0.7
Sakai City, Naka Ward	31,841.00	75.4	5,565.00	13.2	2,678.00	6.3	1,299.00	3.1	560	1.3	282	0.7
Sakai City, Higashi Ward	25,668.00	73.8	4,815.00	13.8	2,593.00	7.5	1,144.00	3.3	326	0.9	220	0.6
Nishi-ku, Sakai City	38,318.00	74.4	6,598.00	12.8	4,120.00	8.0	1,601.00	3.1	570	1.1	295	0.6
Sakai City, Minami Ward	41,306.00	71.4	8,310.00	14.4	5,523.00	9.6	1,806.00	3.1	571	1.0	310	0.5
Sakai City Kita Ward	45,390.00	72.4	8,424.00	13.4	5,489.00	8.8	2,326.00	3.7	630	1.0	450	0.7
Mihara Ward, Sakai City	9,209.00	75.8	1,658.00	13.7	782	6.4	330	2.7	89	0.7	76	0.6
Sakai City	231,237.00	73.1	43,290.00	13.7	26,249.00	8.3	10,261.00	3.2	3,308.00	1.0	1,994.00	0.6
Kishiwada City	47,324.00	74.7	6,952.00	11.0	5,844.00	9.2	2,287.00	3.6	594	0.9	346	0.5
Toyonaka City	115,706.00	74.6	19,462.00	12.5	11,614.00	7.5	5,829.00	3.8	1,418.00	0.9	1,102.00	0.7
Ikeda City	30,317.00	71.4	6,279.00	14.8	3,713.00	8.7	1,541.00	3.6	308	0.7	297	0.7
Suita City	116,569.00	73.7	18,763.00	11.9	14,601.00	9.2	5,892.00	3.7	1,347.00	0.9	1,029.00	0.7
Izumiotsu City	19,443.00	78.1	2,510.00	10.1	1,836.00	7.4	802	3.2	182	0.7	115	0.5
Takatsuki City	110,140.00	74.5	19,308.00	13.1	11,249.00	7.6	4,641.00	3.1	1,399.00	0.9	1,133.00	0.8
Kaizuka City	19,175.00	75.0	3,325.00	13.0	1,582.00	6.2	1,103.00	4.3	225	0.9	143	0.6
Moriguchi City	39,395.00	77.3	5,336.00	10.5	3,759.00	7.4	1,714.00	3.4	373	0.7	374	0.7
Hirakata City	120,564.00	74.9	20,652.00	12.8	12,204.00	7.6	5,265.00	3.3	1,349.00	0.8	1,010.00	0.6
Ibaraki City	81,907.00	75.2	12,913.00	11.8	8,906.00	8.2	3,593.00	3.3	1,008.00	0.9	644	0.6
Yao City	75,448.00	75.7	11,586.00	11.6	7,955.00	8.0	3,321.00	3.3	839	0.8	538	0.5
Izumisano City	23,727.00	79.4	3,090.00	10.3	1,608.00	5.4	1,063.00	3.6	197	0.7	180	0.6
Tondabayashi City	29,093.00	73.6	4,990.00	12.6	3,532.00	8.9	1,398.00	3.5	261	0.7	270	0.7
Neyagawa City	66,817.00	76.1	10,446.00	11.9	6,803.00	7.7	2,622.00	3.0	705	0.8	442	0.5
Kawachinagano City	33,712.00	76.6	4,861.00	11.0	3,696.00	8.4	1,268.00	2.9	234	0.5	222	0.5
Matsubara City	28,011.00	74.9	4,407.00	11.8	3,317.00	8.9	1,168.00	3.1	320	0.9	189	0.5
Daito City	28,616.00	75.5	4,622.00	12.2	2,882.00	7.6	1,259.00	3.3	289	0.8	212	0.6
Izumi City	45,095.00	76.5	7,046.00	12.0	4,026.00	6.8	1,929.00	3.3	483	0.8	353	0.6
Minoh City	40,618.00	74.1	6,805.00	12.4	4,244.00	7.7	2,261.00	4.1	533	1.0	381	0.7
Kashiwabara City	18,277.00	75.3	2,744.00	11.3	2,064.00	8.5	870	3.6	150	0.6	154	0.6
Habikino City	28,553.00	73.4	4,667.00	12.0	3,844.00	9.9	1,279.00	3.3	299	0.8	238	0.6
Kadoma City	28,514.00	78.3	3,588.00	9.9	2,437.00	6.7	1,257.00	3.5	365	1.0	242	0.7
Settsu City	21,515.00	76.1	2,921.00	10.3	2,559.00	9.0	850	3.0	262	0.9	179	0.6
Takaishi City	17,346.00	76.9	2,532.00	11.2	1,491.00	6.6	802	3.6	253	1.1	128	0.6
Fujiidera City	16,846.00	74.8	2,777.00	12.3	1,899.00	8.4	735	3.3	156	0.7	117	0.5
Higashi-Osaka City	124,855.00	75.1	20,955.00	12.6	11,672.00	7.0	6,067.00	3.6	1,638.00	1.0	1,047.00	0.6
Sennan City	13,406.00	76.2	2,124.00	12.1	1,213.00	6.9	636	3.6	111	0.6	103	0.6
Shijonawate City	14,404.00	76.3	2,280.00	12.1	1,282.00	6.8	665	3.5	149	0.8	107	0.6
Katano City	23,952.00	74.4	4,174.00	13.0	2,587.00	8.0	1,067.00	3.3	248	0.8	184	0.6
Osaka Sayama City	16,338.00	75.4	2,544.00	11.7	1,798.00	8.3	719	3.3	132	0.6	148	0.7
Hannan City	13,973.00	76.9	2,233.00	12.3	1,165.00	6.4	552	3.0	123	0.7	125	0.7
Shimamoto Town	10,547.00	71.8	1,948.00	13.3	1,464.00	10.0	533	3.6	112	0.8	93	0.6
Mishima Village	10,547.00	71.8	1,948.00	13.3	1,464.00	10.0	533	3.6	112	0.8	93	0.6
Toyono Town	6,886.00	73.0	1,410.00	14.9	734	7.8	315	3.3	43	0.5	47	0.5
Nose Town	2,946.00	71.6	600	14.6	296	7.2	186	4.5	51	1.2	35	0.9
Toyono Town	9,832.00	72.6	2,010.00	14.8	1,030.00	7.6	501	3.7	94	0.7	82	0.6
Tadaoka Town	4,562.00	77.0	555	9.4	511	8.6	182	3.1	76	1.3	36	0.6
Senboku County	4,562.00	77.0	555	9.4	511	8.6	182	3.1	76	1.3	36	0.6
Kumatori Town	11,397.00	75.7	1,865.00	12.4	1,089.00	7.2	543	3.6	90	0.6	76	0.5
Tajiri Town	2,234.00	75.6	305	10.3	259	8.8	108	3.7	31	1.0	17	0.6
Cape Town	4,979.00	77.4	849	13.2	393	6.1	154	2.4	31	0.5	30	0.5
Sennan County	18,610.00	76.1	3,019.00	12.3	1,741.00	7.1	805	3.3	152	0.6	123	0.5
Taishi Town	3,532.00	75.2	544	11.6	427	9.1	144	3.1	22	0.5	29	0.6
Kawanamachi	4,384.00	76.1	630	10.9	464	8.1	210	3.6	46	0.8	24	0.4
Chihaya Akasaka Village	1,749.00	73.8	244	10.3	274	11.6	90	3.8	8	0.3	6	0.3
Minami-Kawachi District	9,665.00	75.3	1,418.00	11.1	1,165.00	9.1	444	3.5	76	0.6	59	0.5
