= Kotaro Tatsumi =

Japanese politician (born 1976)

- 辰巳 孝太郎
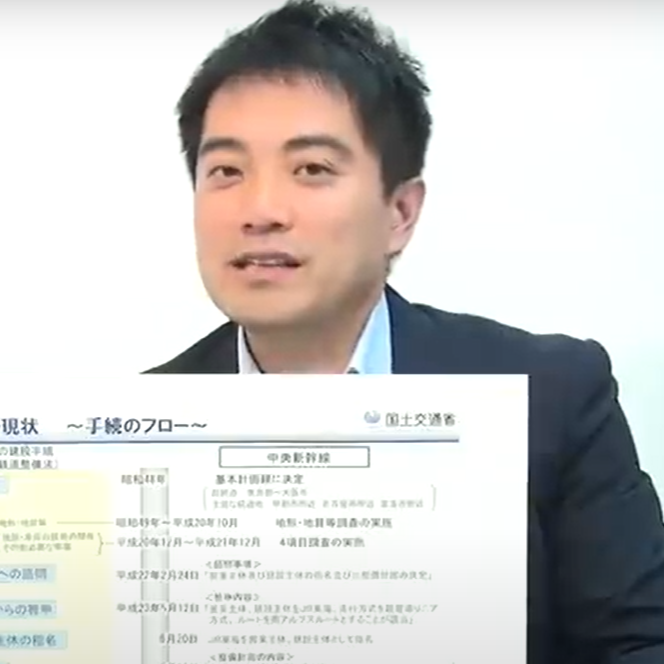
- Tatsumi in 2014

Member of the House of Representatives
- Incumbent
- Assumed office 1 November 2024
- Preceded by: Multi-member district
- Constituency: Kinki PR

Member of the House of Councillors
- In office 29 July 2013 – 28 July 2019
- Preceded by: Seat established
- Succeeded by: Mizuho Umemura
- Constituency: Osaka at-large

Personal details
- Born: 21 August 1976 (age 50) Nishiyodogawa-ku, Osaka, Japan
- Party: JCP (since 2002)
- Education: Emerson College

Kotaro Tatsumi (Japanese: 辰巳 孝太郎, Hepburn: Tatsumi Kōtarō; born 21 August 1976) is a Japanese politician who serves in the House of Representatives for Kinki PR as a member of the Japanese Communist Party. Tatsumi was in the House of Councillors for Osaka from 2013 to 2019. He was a candidate in the 2023 Osaka gubernatorial election.

== Biography ==
Tatsumi was born on 21 August 1976, in Nishiyodogawa-ku, Osaka. He is the youngest of four brothers. He entered the Kitano Prefectural High School, where he was a member of a rugby club and became a student council president. During his tenure as the president, he volunteered to support leprosy patients in Bangladesh. He then travelled to the United States to explore his options before entering and graduating from that country's Emerson College with a degree in Film Studies. After returning to Japan, he joined a video production company. In 2000, he participated in a project aiming to invite high school students who had suffered from the Kosovo War to Japan. Following the September 11 attacks and feeling frustrated with the Japanese government's passive support of the United States war on Iraq and Afghanistan, he joined the Japanese Communist Party (JCP) in 2002 after being drawn to the anti-war slogans of the party.

In 2003, Tatsumi ran for a seat in the Osaka Prefectural Assembly but lost. He also unsuccessfully ran for the same position in the 2007 and 2011 elections. He decided to run for the 2013 Japanese House of Councillors election for Osaka at-large district. He won the election, the first time JCP won a seat in Osaka in 15 years. He run for re-election in 2019 but was defeated by candidates from Ishin no Kai and Liberal Democratic Party (LDP) receiving approximately 380,000 votes. Following an unsuccessful run for the same seat in 2022, he ran for the 2023 Osaka gubernatorial election as an independent. He was endorsed for this by JCP but defeated by incumbent Hirofumi Yoshimura.

Tatsumi was elected as a member of the House of Representatives for Kinki proportional representation block for the JCP in the 2024 Japanese general election. He was again reelected to the same seat in 2026. He is a member of the House of Representatives' Health, Labour and Welfare Committee, Budget Committee, and Special Committee on Reconstruction and Nuclear Power.

== Personal life ==
Tatsumi was married and had one daughter and two sons.

=== Political views ===
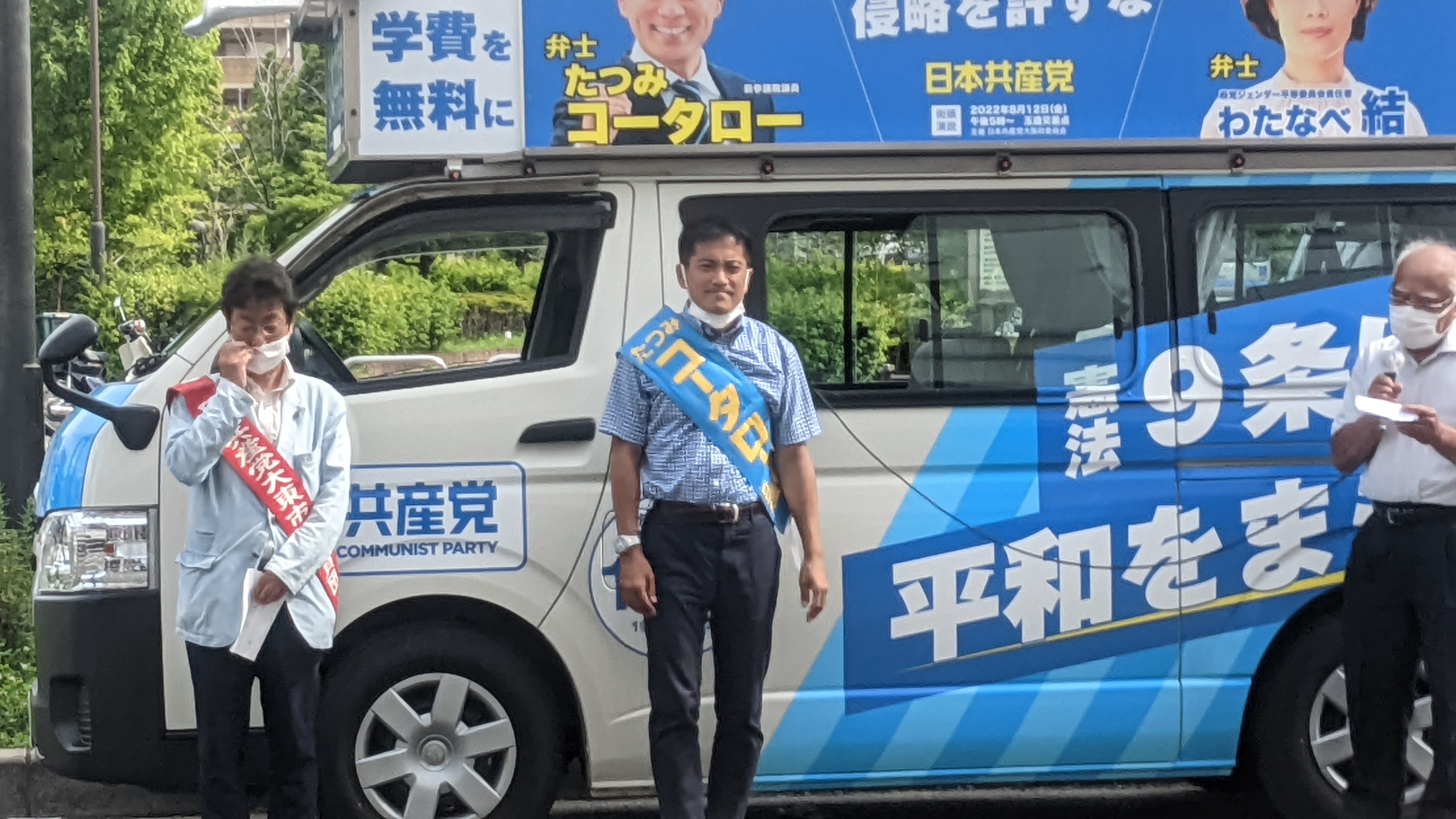
Tatsumi during a campaign in 2022

Tatsumi said in 2019 that he was against the amendment of the Japanese Constitution. He is also against the amendment of the Article 9 of the Japanese Constitution, including the strengthening of the Japan Self-Defense Forces. He is somewhat against the strengthening of United States–Japan relations, supported strengthening of Japan–South Korea relations, but remains neutral on strengthening of China-Japan relations.

Tatsumi is against Fumio Kishida's New Form of Capitalism and supports an increase in taxes on wealthy individuals. He is also against the reduction of pension and medical expense benefits. He stated that the consumption taxes should be permanently reduced or abolished. He was opposed to the MagLev system, saying that it is a waste of resources.

Tatsumi supported the abolition of nuclear power in Japan. He also supported same-sex marriage and allowing female emperors, but is against the return of the former imperial family member who left the imperial family after the war. He agrees on decreasing the acceptance of the number of foreigners residing in Japan.
