= 2019 Osaka mayoral election =

Japanese local election

- April 7, 2019
- Turnout: 52.70%
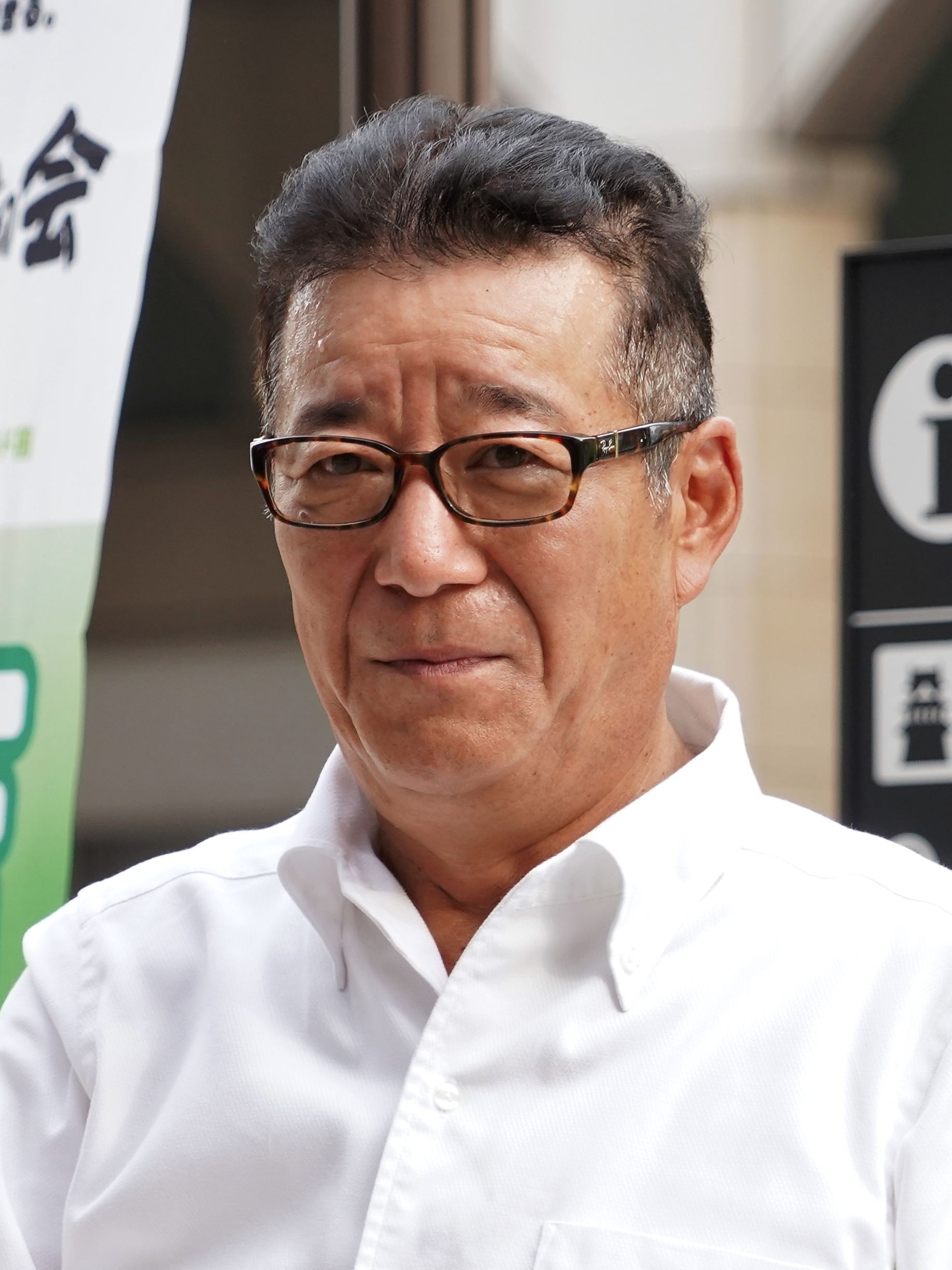

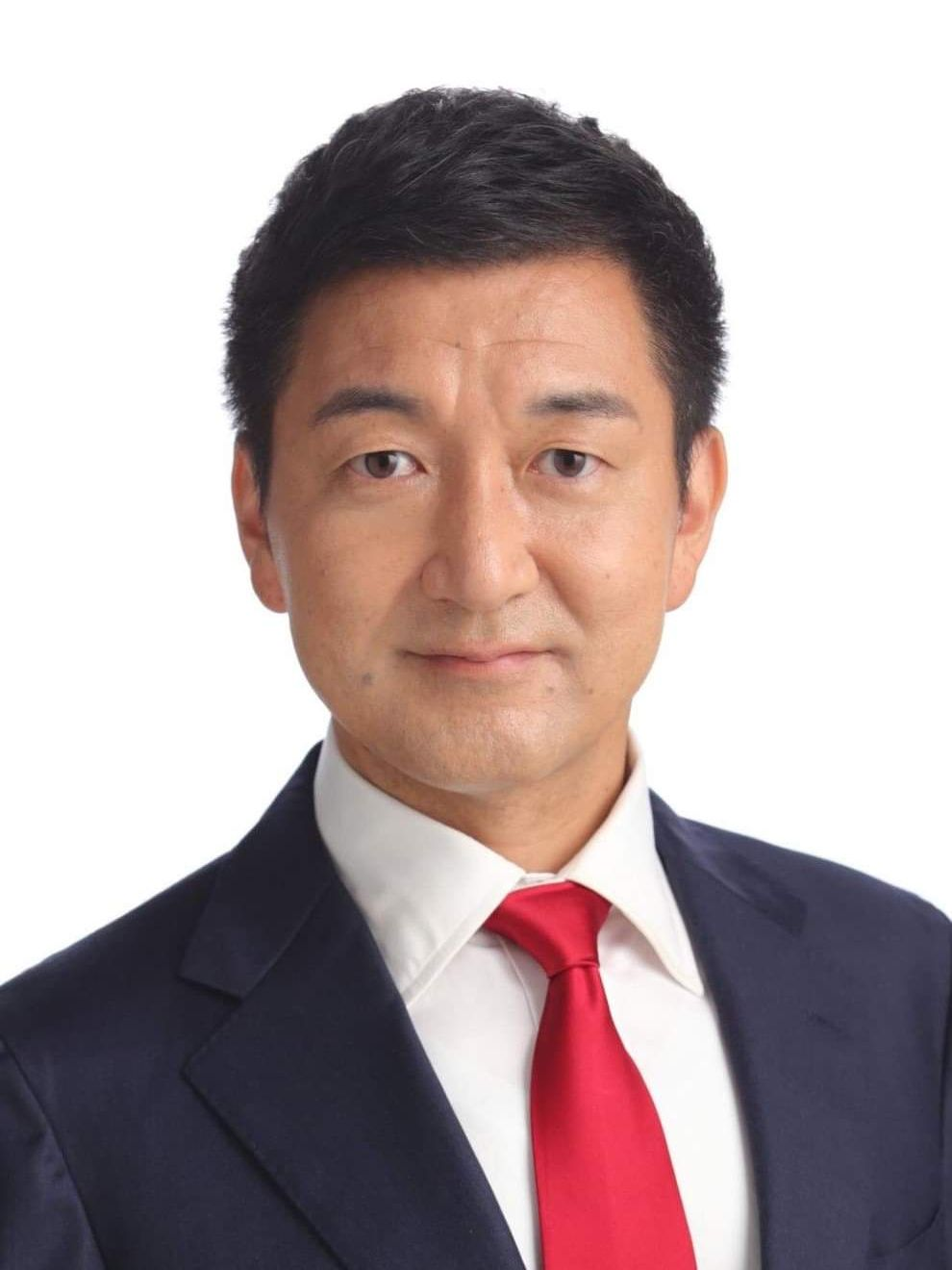
Candidate	Ichiro Matsui	Akira Yanagimoto
Party	One Osaka	Independent
Popular vote	660,819	476,351
Percentage	58.11%	41.89%
Mayor of Osaka before election
Hirofumi Yoshimura
One Osaka
Elected Mayor of Osaka
Ichirō Matsui
One Osaka

The 2019 Osaka mayoral election was held on 7 April 2019 to elect the next mayor of Osaka. Incumbent mayor Hirofumi Yoshimura decided to not seek a second term as mayor of Osaka in order to run as Governor of Osaka. The result of the election was a victory for Governor of Osaka Prefecture Ichiro Matsui. He received 58% of the vote.

== Candidates ==
- Ichiro Matsui, Governor of Osaka Prefecture for Osaka Restoration Association.
- Akira Yanagimoto, City councillor back by LDP, Komeito, DPFP.

== Results ==
Osaka mayoral 2019
Party	Candidate	Votes	%	±%
Osaka Restoration Association	Ichiro Matsui	660,819	58.11	
Independent	Akira Yanagimoto	476,351	41.89	
Turnout		1,154,152	52.70	
Registered electors		2,189,852		
Osaka Restoration Association hold		Swing		
