= 2019 Osaka prefectural election =

Election for prefectural assembly members held in 2019

← 2015	7 April 2019	2023 →

All 88 seats in the Osaka Prefectural Assembly 45 seats needed for a majority
- Turnout: 50.44% (▲5.26%)
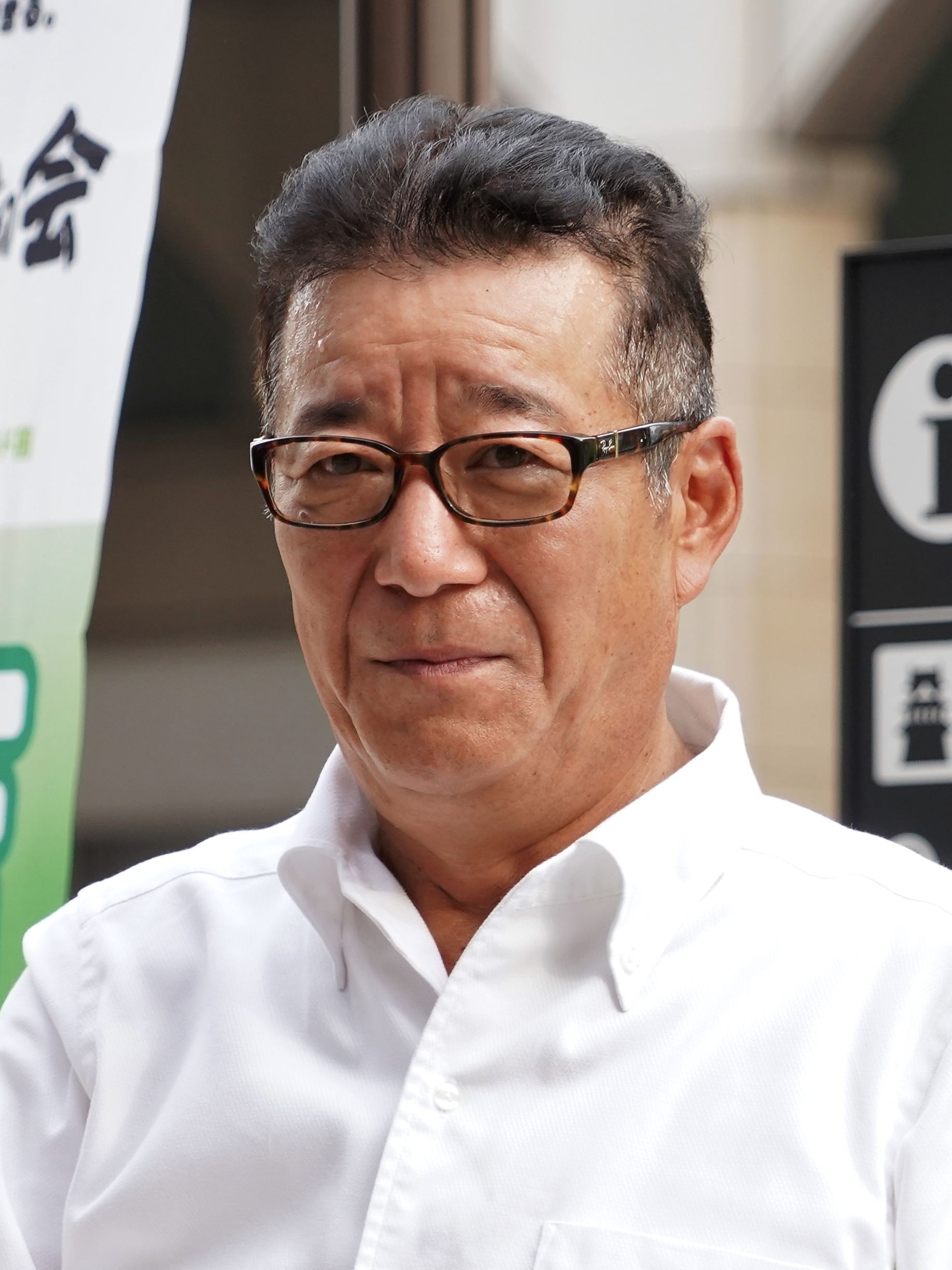

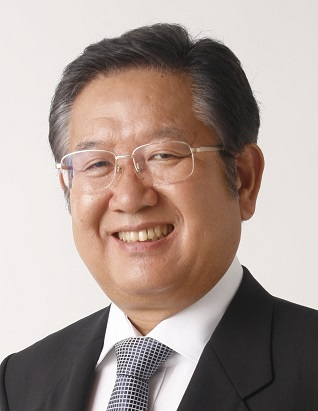

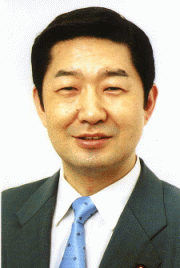
	First party	Second party
Leader	Ichirō Matsui	Akira Satō
Party	One Osaka	Liberal Democratic
Seats before	40	24
Seats after	51	15
Seat change	▲11	▼9
Popular vote	1,530,336	697,404
Percentage	50.72%	23.11%
	Third party	Fourth party
Leader	Shigeki Sato	Toshiaki Yanagi
Party	Komeito	Communist
Seats before	15	2
Seats after	15	2
Seat change	Steady	Steady
Popular vote	311,332	243,270
Percentage	10.32%	8.06%
- Post-election composition of the assembly by political party
Governor before election
Ichirō Matsui
One Osaka
Elected Governor
Hirofumi Yoshimura
One Osaka

The 2019 Osaka Prefectural Assembly Election (Japanese: 2019年大阪府議会議員選挙, romanized: 2019-nen Osaka-fu Gikaigiin Senkyo) was held on 7 April to elect the 88 members of the Osaka Prefectural Assembly.

== Overview ==
The 88 seats of the Osaka Prefectural Assembly are up for election in every four years. For this election, a total of 146 candidates ran for the 88 seats in 53 electoral districts. No voting took place in 13 elections of 8 districts, as candidates in these races face no opposition.

== Results ==
Election results
Party	Votes	Percentage	Seats	Change
Osaka Restoration Association	1,530,336	50.72%	51	▲11
Liberal Democratic Party	697,403	23.11%	15	▼9
Komeito	311,332	10.32%	15	Steady
Japanese Communist Party	243,270	8.06%	2	Steady
Constitutional Democratic Party	58,695	1.95%	1	▲1
Democratic Party For the People	2,806	0.09%	0	▼1
Independent	173,507	5.75%	4	Steady
Total	3,017,349	100.00%	88	
