= 2023 Osaka mayoral election =

Japanese local election

- 9 April 2023
- Turnout: 1,015,766; 48.33% (▼4.37 pp)
Candidate	Hideyuki Yokoyama	Taeko Kitano
Party	One Osaka	Independent
Popular vote	655,802	268,227
Percentage	64.56%	26.41%
Supported by	—	LDP, CDP
Mayor of Osaka before election
Ichiro Matsui
One Osaka
Elected Mayor of Osaka
Hideyuki Yokoyama
One Osaka

The 2023 Osaka mayoral election took place on 9 April 2023 as part of the 20th unified local elections to elect the next mayor of Osaka. Incumbent mayor Ichiro Matsui decided not to seek a second term as mayor of Osaka, opting instead to retire from politics at the end of his term. The election resulted in a landslide victory for Hideyuki Yokoyama, the candidate from the Osaka Restoration Association, who secured 64.56% of the vote. Taeko Kitano, who was supported by the Liberal Democratic Party and the Constitutional Democratic Party, received 26.41% of the vote.

== Background ==
Following the rejection of his proposal to abolish Osaka City and establish an Osaka Metropolis, incumbent mayor Ichiro Matsui announced his intention to retire from politics at the end of his current term. The election was announced on 26 March 2023, to be held on 9 April 2023 in conjunction with elections for the Osaka City Council, the Osaka Prefectural Assembly, and the governor of Osaka Prefecture.

== Candidates ==
=== Osaka Restoration Association ===
==== Declared ====
- Satoru Fujita, Osaka City Council member
- Rie Honda, Osaka City Council member
- Kenta Matsunami, Osaka Prefectural Assembly member
- Futoshi Okazaki, Osaka City Council member
- Hideyuki Yokoyama, Osaka Prefectural Assembly member

==== Results ====
Fujita, Honda, and Matsunami were eliminated on 4 November 2022 during an internal Osaka Restoration Society selection meeting. Yokoyama then defeated Okazaki in a runoff election on 10 December 2022.

=== Independent ===
==== Declared ====
- Yasuhiko Aramaki, restaurant owner
- Taeko Kitano, Osaka City Council member (backed by Liberal Democratic Party and Constitutional Democratic Party)
- Nepensa, author
- Toshihiko Yamazaki, physical therapist

== Results ==
=== City-wide results ===
2019 Osaka mayoral election
Party	Candidate	Votes	%	±%
Osaka Restoration Association	Hideyuki Yokoyama	655,802	64.56%	+6.45
Independent	Taeko Kitano	268,227	26.41%	n/a
Independent	Toshihiko Yamazaki	45,369	4.47%	n/a
Independent	Yasuhiko Aramaki	30,960	3.05%	n/a
Independent	Nepensa	15,408	1.52%	n/a
Total votes		1,015,766	100%	
Osaka Restoration Association hold				

=== Ward results ===
ward name	Hideyuki Yokoyama	Taeko Kitano	Toshihiko Yamazaki	Yasuhiko Aramaki	Nepensa
Osaka City total	655,802	268,227	45,369	30,960	15,408
Kita Ward	34,795	11,210	2,515	1,730	821
Toshima Ward	28,607	10,485	2,097	1,632	583
Fukushima Ward	20,303	6,783	1,335	783	380
Konohana Ward	16,057	6,557	925	639	404
Chuo Ward	23,849	9,393	1,356	1,396	518
Nishi Ward	23,622	8,653	1,251	1,198	501
Minato Ward	19,422	8,732	1,338	852	474
Taisho District	15,697	6,336	986	820	394
Tennoji Ward	20,073	8,134	1,030	1,064	430
Naniwa Ward	10,889	4,593	768	662	281
Nishiyodogawa Ward	22,661	10,189	1,385	1,328	596
Yodogawa Ward	41,715	20,109	1,986	1,678	884
Higashiyodogawa Ward	39,868	15,792	2,450	1,767	923
Higashinari Ward	20,702	8,130	1,773	914	532
Ikuno Ward	23,517	10,508	1,866	1,370	643
Asahi Ward	22,734	10,444	2,794	1,102	559
Joto Ward	46,115	16,942	4,402	1,709	1,076
Tsurumi Ward	29,369	9,585	2,485	1,125	618
Abeno Ward	28,697	13,719	2,595	1,286	502
Suminoe Ward	30,191	12,771	1,773	1,700	754
Sumiyoshi Ward	37,080	17,645	2,313	1,748	899
Higashi Sumiyoshi Ward	32,515	14,182	1,725	1,311	769
Hirano Ward	46,733	17,490	3,063	2,249	1,283
Nishinari Ward	20,591	9,845	1,158	897	584

All results published by Osaka City.
