= Yoshio Matsui =

Japanese politician (1937–2024)

- 松井良夫

Speaker of the Osaka Prefectural Assembly
- In office May 1996 – May 1997
- Preceded by: Masateru Kitahama
- Succeeded by: Haruyoshi Tokunaga

Member of the Osaka Prefectural Assembly
- In office 1979–2003
- Constituency: Yao City

Member of the Yao City Council
- In office 1971–1979

Personal details
- Born: 27 January 1937 Yao, Osaka, Japan
- Died: 13 October 2024 (aged 87)
- Party: Liberal Democratic
- Children: Ichirō Matsui
- Education: Kansai University

Yoshio Matsui (Japanese: 松井良夫 Matsui Yoshio; 27 January 1937 – 13 October 2024) was a Japanese politician. A member of the Liberal Democratic Party, he served as speaker of the Osaka Prefectural Assembly from 1996 to 1997. He was the father of Ichirō Matsui, the former Governor of Osaka Prefecture and co-counder of Nippon Ishin no Kai.

Matsui died on 13 October 2024, at the age of 87.
