= Nobuyuki Baba =

Japanese politician (born 1965)

- 馬場 伸幸
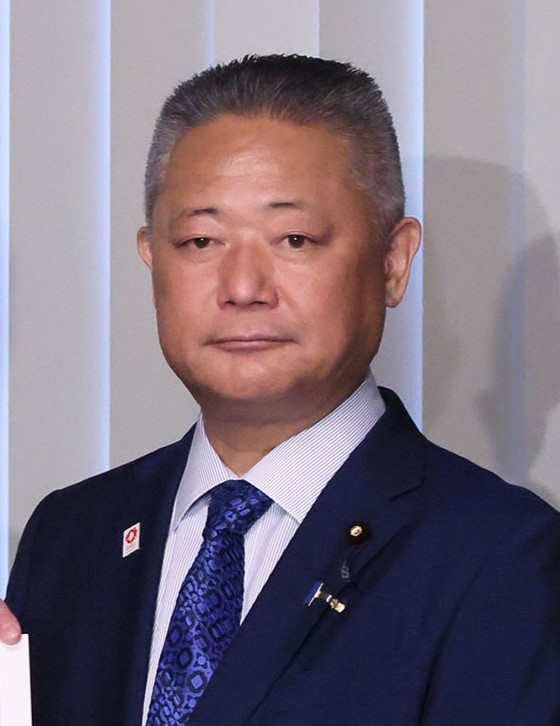
- Baba in 2023

Leader of the Japan Innovation Party
- In office 27 August 2022 – 1 December 2024
- Preceded by: Ichirō Matsui
- Succeeded by: Hirofumi Yoshimura

Co-Leader of the Japan Innovation Party
- In office 30 November 2021 – 27 August 2022
- Leader: Ichirō Matsui
- Preceded by: Toranosuke Katayama
- Succeeded by: Hirofumi Yoshimura

Member of the House of Representatives; for Osaka's 17th district
- Incumbent
- Assumed office 17 December 2012
- Preceded by: Megumu Tsuji

Member of the Sakai City Council
- In office 1993–2012
- Constituency: Nishi Ward

Personal details
- Born: 27 January 1965 (age 61) Sakai, Osaka, Japan
- Party: Japan Innovation Party (National); Osaka Restoration Association (Local)
- Other political affiliations: LDP (before 2010); JRP (2012–2014); JIP (2014–2015)
- Education: Osaka Prefectural Ohtori High School

Nobuyuki Baba (馬場 伸幸, Baba Nobuyuki; born 27 January 1965) is a Japanese politician who led the Japan Innovation Party between 2022 and 2024. He is also a member of the House of Representatives in the Diet (national legislature), currently for the Osaka 17th district.

== Biography ==
Baba was born in Sakai city, Osaka in 1965, and graduated Osaka Prefectural Ōtori High School. In 1993, he was elected to the Sakai City Council for the first time. He served as a member of the Sakai City Council until 2012. He was a member of the Liberal Democratic Party for a long time when he was a city councilor, but left the party in 2010 to join the formation of the Osaka Restoration Association, and has served as vice president of the party since 2011.

In 2012, Baba resigned as a member of the Sakai City Council. In the same year, he ran in the 2012 general election for the House of Representatives in Osaka's 17th district from the Japan Restoration Party and was elected for the first time.

In September 2014, Baba participated in the formation of the Japan Innovation Party through the merger of the Unity Party and the Japan Restoration Party, and was reelected in the 2014 general election for the House of Representatives in Osaka's 17th district. Subsequently, he was newly appointed as the chairman of the Diet Affairs Committee of the Japan Innovation Party.

In August 2015, when the Restoration Party split, Baba announced that he would join the new party led by then Osaka Mayor Hashimoto, and on 8 September, he was removed from his position as chairman of the Japan Innovation Party's Diet Affairs Committee.

On 25 December, Baba officially joined the Initiative from Osaka and became the party's secretary general.

Baba was elected for the third time in the 2017 general election for the House of Representatives; he was elected for the fourth time in the 2021 general election for the House of Representatives.

On 30 November 2021, Baba was appointed co-leader and the leader of parliamentary delegate of Nippon Ishin no Kai.

In July 2022, Ichirō Matsui, then leader of Nippon Ishin no Kai, announced his resignation; on 2 August Baba announced his candidacy for party representative following Matsui's resignation; on 27 August Baba received 8,527 of the 10,825 valid votes cast and became the party's new leader that same day. He stepped down in the wake of the party's poor showing in the 2024 Japanese general election on 27 October and was replaced by Osaka Prefecture governor Hirofumi Yoshimura on 1 December.
