= 2015 Osaka gubernatorial election =

- 22 November 2015
- Registered: 7,050,366 (▲0.26%)
- Turnout: 3,205,866; 45.47% (▼7.41 pp)
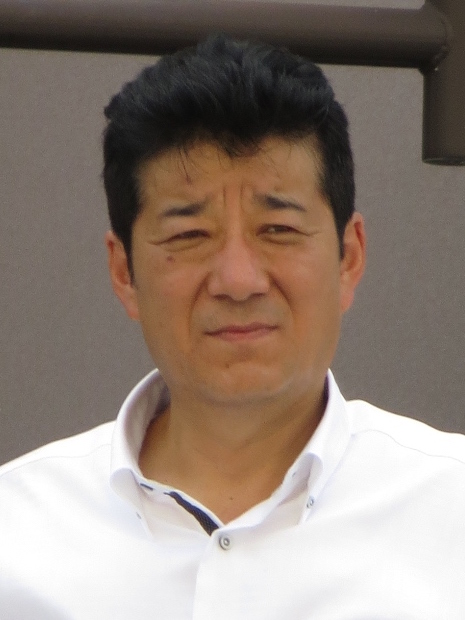

| Candidate | Ichirō Matsui | Takako Kurihara |
| Party | One Osaka | Independent |
| Popular vote | 2,025,387 | 1,051,174 |
| Percentage | 64.1% | 33.3% |
| Supported by | – | LDP, JCP, DPJ |
Governor before election
Ichirō Matsui
One Osaka
Elected Governor
Ichirō Matsui
One Osaka

The 2015 Osaka gubernatorial election took place on 22 November 2015 to elect the governor of Osaka Prefecture. Incumbent governor Ichirō Matsui decided to seek a second term. The election resulted in a landslide victory for Matsui, receiving 64% of the vote, whilst runner up Takako Kurihara, who was supported by the Liberal Democratic Party, Japanese Communist Party and Democratic Party of Japan, received 33%.

The election was held following the expiration of the term of the incumbent governor.

== Results ==
2015 Osaka gubernatorial election
| Party | Candidate | Votes | % | ±% |
|---|---|---|---|---|
| One Osaka | Ichirō Matsui | 2,025,387 | 64.1 | +9.4 |
| Independent (Note: Endorsed by the LDP, DPJ, and JCP) | Takako Kurihara | 1,051,174 | 33.3 | N/A |
| Independent | Yukinori Mima | 84,762 | 2.7 | N/A |
| Registered electors | | 7,050,366 | | |
| Turnout | | 3,205,866 | 45.47 | −7.41 |
| One Osaka hold | | Swing | ▲9.4 | |

Matsui received far more votes than Kurihara and Mima in all cities, towns and villages in Osaka Prefecture.
