= Hideyuki Yokoyama =

Japanese economist and politician (born 1981)

- 横山 英幸
- Hideyuki in 2026

Mayor of Osaka
- Incumbent
- Assumed office 9 April 2023
- Preceded by: Ichirō Matsui

Member of Osaka Prefectural Assembly
- In office 30 April 2011 – 26 March 2023
- Constituency: Yodogawa-ku, Osaka City

Personal details
- Born: 13 May 1981 (age 45) Mitoyo, Kagawa, Japan
- Party: Nippon Ishin no Kai (national); Osaka Restoration Association (local)
- Education: Kwansei Gakuin University

Hideyuki Yokoyama (横山 英幸, Yokoyama Hideyuki; born 13 May 1981) is a Japanese economist and politician who has served as the incumbent mayor of Osaka since 9 April 2023. He graduated from Kwansei Gakuin University with a degree in economics in 2004 and immediately began a career under the Osaka prefectural government. He was elected to the Osaka Prefectural Assembly in April 2011 and won further two terms in April 2015 and April 2019. He was elected as Osaka Restoration Association / Nippon Ishin No Kai candidate for mayor of Osaka in the April 2023 Osaka mayoral election following the previous incumbent, Ichirō Matsui's retirement from politics following the defeat of the Osaka Metropolis Plan in a 2020 referendum. He was reelected in 2026.
