= 2019 Osaka gubernatorial election =

Japanese election

- 7 April 2019
- Turnout: 49.49% ▲4.02%
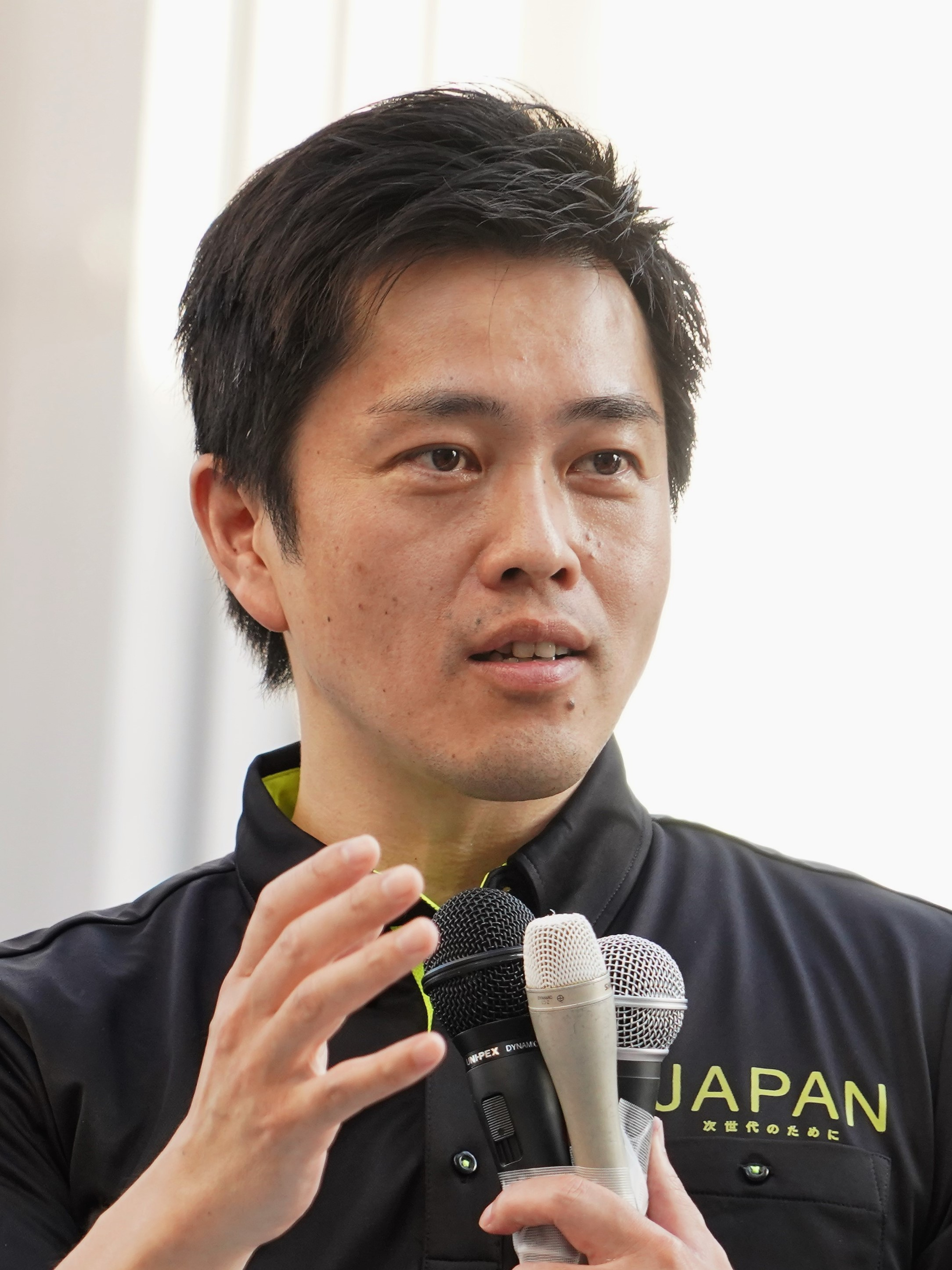
Candidate	Hirofumi Yoshimura	Tadakazu Konishi
Party	One Osaka	Independent
Popular vote	2,266,103	1,254,200
Percentage	64.37%	35.63%
Supported by	—	LDP, Komeito, DPFP
- Voting results by municipality Yoshimura
Governor of Osaka Prefecture before election
Ichirō Matsui
One Osaka
Elected Governor of Osaka Prefecture
Hirofumi Yoshimura
One Osaka

The 2019 Osaka gubernatorial election took place on April 7, 2019, to elect the next governor of Osaka Prefecture. Incumbent Governor Ichirō Matsui decided to not seek a third term so that he could run for mayor of Osaka city. The election resulted in a landslide victory for Hirofumi Yoshimura, the mayor of Osaka. Yoshimura received 64% of the vote, while Tadakazu Konishi, who was supported by the Liberal Democratic Party, Komeito and DPFP, received 35%.

== Candidates ==
- Hirofumi Yoshimura, for Restoration.
- Tadakazu Konishi, backed by the LDP, Komeito, and the DPFP.

== Results ==
2019 Osaka gubernatorial
Party	Candidate	Votes	%	±%
Osaka Restoration Association	Hirofumi Yoshimura	2,266,103	64.37	+ 0.30
LDP	Tadakazu Konishi	1,254,200	35.63	+ 2.38
Turnout		3,569,907	49.49	+ 4.02
Registered electors		7,213,730		
Osaka Restoration Association hold		Swing	+ 0.30	
