= 2008 Osaka gubernatorial election =

2008 Osaka Osaka gubernatorial election
← 2004	January 27, 2008	2011 →
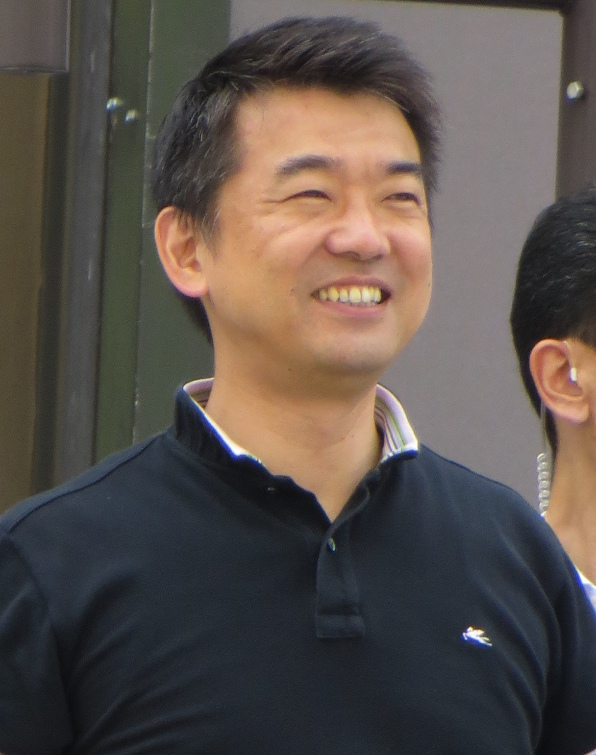
Candidate	Tōru Hashimoto	Sadatoshi Kumagai
Party	Independent	Independent
Popular vote	1,832,857	999,082
Percentage	54.02%	29.45
Supported by	LDP, Komeito	DPJ, SDP, SNP
Governor before election
Fusae Ohta
Independent
Elected Governor
Tōru Hashimoto
Independent

The 2008 Osaka gubernatorial election were held in Osaka Prefecture on January 27, 2008, to elect the next governor of Osaka. Toru Hashimoto was elected as new governor.

== Results ==
Gubernatorial election 2008: Osaka Prefecture
Party	Candidate	Votes	%	±%
LDP	Toru Hashimoto	1,832,857	54.02	
DPJ, SDP, SNP	Sadatoshi Kumagai	999,082	29.45	
JCP	Shoji Umeda	518,563	15.28	
Independent	Masaaki Takahashi	22,154		
Independent	Seiichi Sugiura	20,161		

== Sources ==
- Results from JanJan (in Japanese)
