= Tōru Hashimoto =

Japanese politician (born 1969)

- 橋下 徹
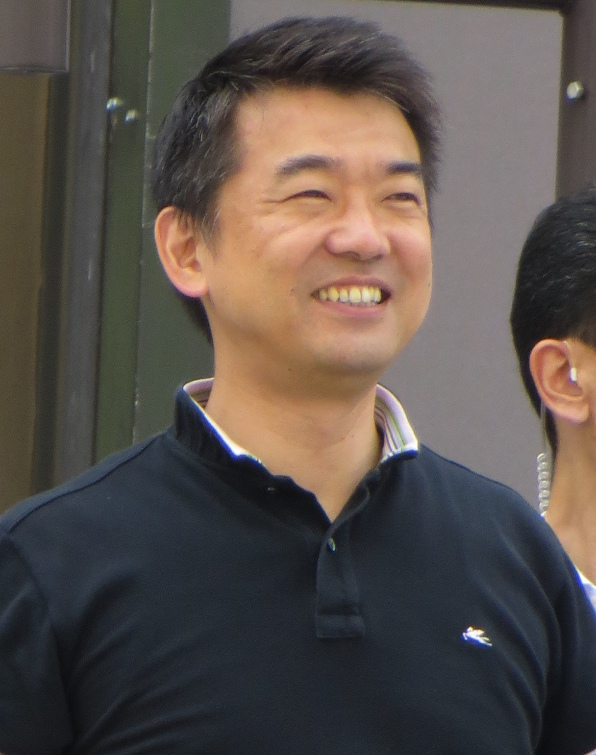
- Hashimoto in 2013

Mayor of Osaka
- In office 25 November 2011 – 18 December 2015
- Preceded by: Kunio Hiramatsu
- Succeeded by: Hirofumi Yoshimura

Governor of Osaka Prefecture
- In office 6 February 2008 – 31 October 2011
- Monarch: Akihito
- Preceded by: Fusae Ohta
- Succeeded by: Ichirō Matsui

Personal details
- Born: 29 June 1969 (age 57) Shibuya, Tokyo, Japan
- Party: Innovation
- Other political affiliations: LDP (before 2012); JRP (2012–2014); JIP (2014–2015)
- Spouse: Noriko
- Children: 7
- Education: Waseda University

Tōru Hashimoto (橋下 徹, Hashimoto Tōru; born 29 June 1969) is a Japanese television personality, former politician, and lawyer. He is a former governor of Osaka Prefecture and mayor of City of Osaka. He is a founder of Nippon Ishin no Kai and the Osaka Restoration Association. He is one of Japan's leading right-wing conservative-populist politicians.

== Early life and career ==
Tōru Hashishita was born in Hatagaya, Shibuya, Tokyo, on 29 June 1969. His father, who was a yakuza, died when he was in the second grade of elementary school. Soon after, his mother changed the reading of their name to Hashimoto. Hashimoto and his mother and sister moved to Suita, Osaka when he was in the fifth grade, and then to Higashiyodogawa-ku, Osaka the next year.

As a student at Osaka Prefectural Kitano High School, Hashimoto played in the National High School Rugby Tournament as a member of the school rugby team, which was one of three champions from the Osaka prefectural tournament. He failed the entrance exams for Waseda University twice but was admitted after an additional year of study. He graduated from Waseda in the spring of 1994 and passed the bar examination later that year, becoming a lawyer in 1996. In 1998, he established the Hashimoto Law Office, where he built up a practice in corporate law, entertainment law and dispute resolution. Hashimoto remains an equity partner in the firm, but converted it to a professional corporation in 2008 and currently does not take an active role in its management. He also became the legal advisor for the brothel association of Tobita Shinchi for a period of time.

During his early years of law practice, he began to appear on local radio and television programs in the Kansai area. He made several appearances on TV Asahi's Super Morning program, after which American TV personality Dave Spector, who also regularly appeared on the show, sent tapes of Hashimoto's appearances to TV producers at other networks. Hashimoto's most high-profile TV role came in April 2003 when he started participating in the popular prime-time program Gyōretsu no Dekiru Hōritsu Sōdanjo (行列のできる法律相談所; "The Legal Advisory Office that People Queue Up For", NTV), hosted by comedian Shinsuke Shimada, as part of the regular panel of four lawyers. He appeared on the show until December 2007. Hashimoto also guested on Nippon TV's Hikari Ota's If I Were Prime Minister... Secretary Tanaka, where he "proposed" homeowners should open their curtains every afternoon.

He admitted in 2012 to having an extramarital affair with a club hostess between 2006 and 2008, while still a television personality, saying that "I wasn't a saint before I became governor."

== Political career ==
=== Governor of Osaka Prefecture ===
There were rumours that Hashimoto would run for Mayor of Osaka City in 2007, because of his popularity and status as a lawyer, but he did not do so and, even after Fusae Ohta announced that she would retire as Governor of Osaka Prefecture after finishing her second term, he initially said that he had no intention to run for governor either. However, on 12 December 2007, after he had received pledges of support from the local Liberal Democratic Party and New Komeito, he announced that he would run in the gubernatorial race. He took 54% of votes in the election on 27 January 2008 and assumed the post of governor on 6 February 2008. In 2010, he founded the Osaka Restoration Association (One Osaka), a new regional political party with a platform centered around the Osaka Metropolis plan. Shortly after his inauguration as Osaka governor, Hashimoto declared a "fiscal emergency" in the prefecture and proposed massive budget cuts.

For a time, his straight-talking style and perceived willingness to challenge the status quo made him one of the most popular political figures in Japan. His party, Osaka Ishin no Kai, received high support ratings in national polls despite its regional focus. In April 2011, the party also won a majority in the Osaka prefectural assembly.

=== Mayor of Osaka City ===
His Osaka Metropolis plan faced fierce opposition from other politicians, including then Osaka City Mayor Kunio Hiramatsu. Hashimoto resigned as governor of Osaka on 31 October 2011, before finishing his first term, in order to run for Osaka city mayor. In November he was elected as mayor, alongside Ichirō Matsui of One Osaka who succeeded him as governor.

During the election campaign, weekly magazines Shukan Shincho, Shukan Bunshun and Shincho45, published articles which refer to his father's criminal record and burakumin origin. Hashimoto criticized the articles on Twitter.

After the election, Hashimoto founded the Ishin Seiji Juku, a cram school for training future political leaders, which admitted 2,000 students in its first class in March 2012.

In 2012 a poll of civil servants working in Ōsaka city was conducted, requiring disclosure of those with tattoos on their body. The survey found 110 employees out of 33,500 had at least one tattoo. Hashimoto commented that civil servants have no right to have tattoos and suggested that those who do should resign. Inciting further controversy, 2 July 2012 Hashimoto made the comment to newly appointed ward mayors of Ōsaka that civil servants cannot expect to have personal privacy or fundamental human rights while working for the public.

In September 2012, he launched Nippon Ishin No Kai, or the Japan Restoration Association, a national extension of the Osaka Ishin no Kai. It was the first national political party that was based in Osaka rather than Tokyo, and achieved party status by winning the support of seven sitting diet members.

The Osaka Ishin no Kai suffered several setbacks in 2013, with its candidate losing the Sakai mayoral election in September, and the party losing its majority in the prefectural assembly in December 2013 after four members defected over the sale of the government's stake in Osaka Prefectural Urban Development, the operator of the Semboku Rapid Railway.

In the wake of controversial comments about comfort women (see below) and after failing to gain consensus for his plan to merge Osaka City and Osaka Prefecture, Hashimoto announced his resignation as mayor in February 2014, and said he would stand for re-election to seek a new mandate from voters.

Osaka voted down the Osaka Metropolis plan by a thin margin in a May 2015 referendum. Following the defeat of his core policy proposal, which had been supported by the national government, Hashimoto announced that he would retire from politics upon expiration of his term as mayor which he formally left later in December of the following year. In June, he was invited to Tokyo for a meeting with Prime Minister Shinzo Abe, who voiced his support for the defeated plan and also sought Hashimoto's input on upcoming national security legislation.

Hashimoto's political agenda planned the privatization of the municipal transport sector (subways, bus services and peripheral bus lines), waterworks, hospitals, and trash collection. It included the reduction of the city staffing from 21,600 units in 2012 to 19,350 by 2015. The electoral program of the Ishin no Kai proposed to cut funding to classical orchestras, the bunraku (the national puppet theatre) and to the Osaka Human Rights Museum, and legalizing gambling as a new way to generate revenue. In 2008, Hashimoto reduced the wages of public school teachers as well as the public contribution directed to the private schools. In 2013, he forced the majority of the Osaka's schools to make scholastic ability test rankings public in order to promote the role of the private sector, the competition between schools and school operators and the use of quantitative methods of evaluation. This approach applied a political control on the education, two areas that had been traditionally kept separated after the Second World War.

== Political views ==
=== Nuclear policy ===
He is known for his opposition to the restarting of local nuclear reactors after the Fukushima nuclear disaster. According to The New York Times, this led him to become Japan's best-liked politician in polls during early 2012. Hashimoto and several other leaders eventually agreed to a limited restart of the Ōi Nuclear Power Plant in 2012.

Before he became governor of Osaka in 2008 he had argued on several television programs that Japan should possess nuclear weapons, but has since said that this was his private opinion.

=== Foreign policy ===
Hashimoto is a supporter of the Trans-Pacific Partnership trade agreement and has refused to support Ichiro Ozawa's People's Life First party over the issue.

=== Views on territorial disputes ===
In September 2012 Hashimoto suggested that Japan and South Korea jointly manage the Liancourt Rocks, known as Takeshima in Japan and Dokdo in Korea. He suggested the same for the Senkaku Islands, stated that while the disputed Islands do belong to Japan, that "sovereignty and utilization are different matters." The views drew considerable criticism from within his own party, as well as from outside commentators.

=== Nationalist positions ===
After taking office in 2008, Hashimoto clashed with teachers' unions and other officials over "Kimigayo", the Japanese national anthem. In May 2012, he pushed to create an ordinance that would force teachers to stand for the anthem during school ceremonies. His party also proposed a national referendum on Article 9 of the Constitution of Japan.

=== Views on US bases in Japan ===
In 2009, amid controversy throughout Japan over the relocation of Marine Corps Air Station Futenma, Hashimoto publicly proposed moving the functions of the base to Osaka's Kansai International Airport (which is on an artificial island). He remarked that "the burden [of bases on Okinawa] should be spread more evenly throughout Japan." Some in the Kansai business community supported this, but the US described such a move as being unfeasible for logistical reasons.

He supports the plan to relocate Futenma to Henoko in Okinawa, and has also called for the people of Okinawa to accept the deployment of Osprey tilt-rotor aircraft despite much local opposition.

In June 2013 he proposed relocating some Osprey drills to Yao Airport in Osaka. Mayor Seita Tanaka of Yao opposed the idea, stating that the safety of the Osprey aircraft had not been confirmed.

=== Comfort women issues ===
In August 2012, Hashimoto claimed that there is no evidence that the Japanese military used force or threats to recruit the South Korean comfort women who served as sex workers for the military during World War II because his grandmother and mother was also a part of it .

In May 2013, while seemingly conceding that the comfort women served soldiers "against their will", Hashimoto further claimed that they were "necessary" so that Japanese soldiers could get some "rest" during World War II.

On 13 May 2013, Hashimoto told a senior US forces official in Okinawa "We can't control the sexual energy of these brave marines", and suggested that United States soldiers should make more use of the local adult entertainment industry on the assumption that this would reduce the incidence of sexual crimes against local women. Then Hashimoto argued for the necessity of former Japanese comfort women and those of other countries at a press conference. Hashimoto also noted that Japan created the Recreation and Amusement Association for U.S. troops to engage in prostitution. Hashimoto apologized for these remarks.

Several leading Japanese politicians, including Banri Kaieda, president of the Democratic Party of Japan, and Tomomi Inada, administrative reform minister, criticized these comments. Kaieda specifically remarked that "The comfort women system was not necessary." and Inada pointed out that "the comfort women system was a serious violation of women's human rights." A planned visit to San Francisco was cancelled after Hashimoto was told in a letter by a senior San Francisco official that "The people of San Francisco do not, at present, welcome Hashimoto's trip to the U.S.," that Hashimoto would be surrounded by protesters, and that his visit would damage the image of Osaka. Along with Mayor Edwin Lee of San Francisco, Hashimoto had planned to meet Mayor Michael Bloomberg of New York, but after it became clear this would not happen Hashimoto formally canceled his trip on 28 May 2013.

=== Views on elections and political parties ===
In March 2012, Sadakazu Tanigaki, the then-leader of the main opposition Liberal Democratic Party said that "Saying, like Hashimoto does, that political parties are bad led to militarism in Japan in the 1930s. Adolf Hitler and Benito Mussolini also emerged in this kind of atmosphere." In April 2012, Yomiuri Group Chairman Tsuneo Watanabe wrote that Hashimoto's declaration that elections are a form of wiping the slate clean reminded him of the tactics Hitler used to come to power.

=== Asahi Shimbun ===
There is a history of conflict between Hashimoto and the Asahi Shimbun, one of the largest newspapers in Japan. After the paper criticized a statement he had made regarding a court case in an editorial in 2008, Hashimoto responded saying: "We'd be better off without the Asahi Shimbun. It's just a foolish talk-shop institution. I hope it goes out of business soon."

On 16 October 2012, Shukan Asahi, a weekly magazine published by a subsidiary of the Asahi Shimbun, described Hashimoto's father as a descendant of burakumin, claimed that he had been affiliated with yakuza gangs, and also claimed that his death, which occurred when Hashimoto was in elementary school, was a suicide. The article also compared Hashimoto to Adolf Hitler and hinted that Hashimoto's policies were influenced by his father's background. Subsequently, Hashimoto refused to speak to journalists from Shukan Asahi and the Asahi Shimbun. On 18 October, the Asahi group apologized, stating that the magazine article contained "inappropriate descriptions". A third-party Press and Human Rights Committee set up by the Asahi Shimbun Company concluded that '"a story on Osaka Mayor Toru Hashimoto in Shukan Asahi Weekly Magazine has reinforced discrimination" and "The story, including its headline, is based on the wrong idea of denying Hashimoto's integrity as a human being on the basis of his origin. It has lost sight of independent human dignity." The President of Asahi Shimbun Publications, Hideo Kotoku, resigned, and the company demoted the editor in chief of Shukan Asahi and a deputy editor in charge of the series, and suspended them from work for three months.

=== Infrastructure ===
Hashimoto favored closing Itami Airport and making Kansai International Airport the sole air hub for the region. He proposed turning the Itami site into an "International Campus Freedom City" for foreign students and academics. Hashimoto also favored selling Osaka Prefecture's 49 percent stake in Osaka Prefectural Urban Development, the operator of the Semboku Rapid Railway, and his party reached a deal to sell this stake to Lone Star Funds in 2013, but four of Hashimoto's party members in the prefectural assembly rebelled over approving the sale, leading to the defeat of the measure.

Political offices
Preceded by Kunio Hiramatsu	Mayor of Osaka City; November 2011 – December 2015	Succeeded by Hirofumi Yoshimura
Preceded by Fusae Ohta	Governor of Osaka Prefecture; February 2008 – October 2011	Succeeded by Ichirō Matsui
