= Osaka City Council =

Local authority of Osaka City, Japan

Osaka City Council 大阪市会 Ōsaka-shikai

Type
- Type: Unicameral

History
- Founded: 1889 (municipal mergers of the Meiji era)

Leadership
- President (gichō): Kazutaka Ohashi, Osaka Ishin since May 27, 2021
- Vice-President (fuku-gichō): Teruaki Nishizaki, Komeito since May 27, 2021

Structure
- Political groups: Majority (46) One Osaka（46) Minority (35) Komeito (18) LDP (11) Independents (4) JCP (2)

Elections
- Voting system: Single non-transferable vote
- Last election: April 9, 2023

Meeting place
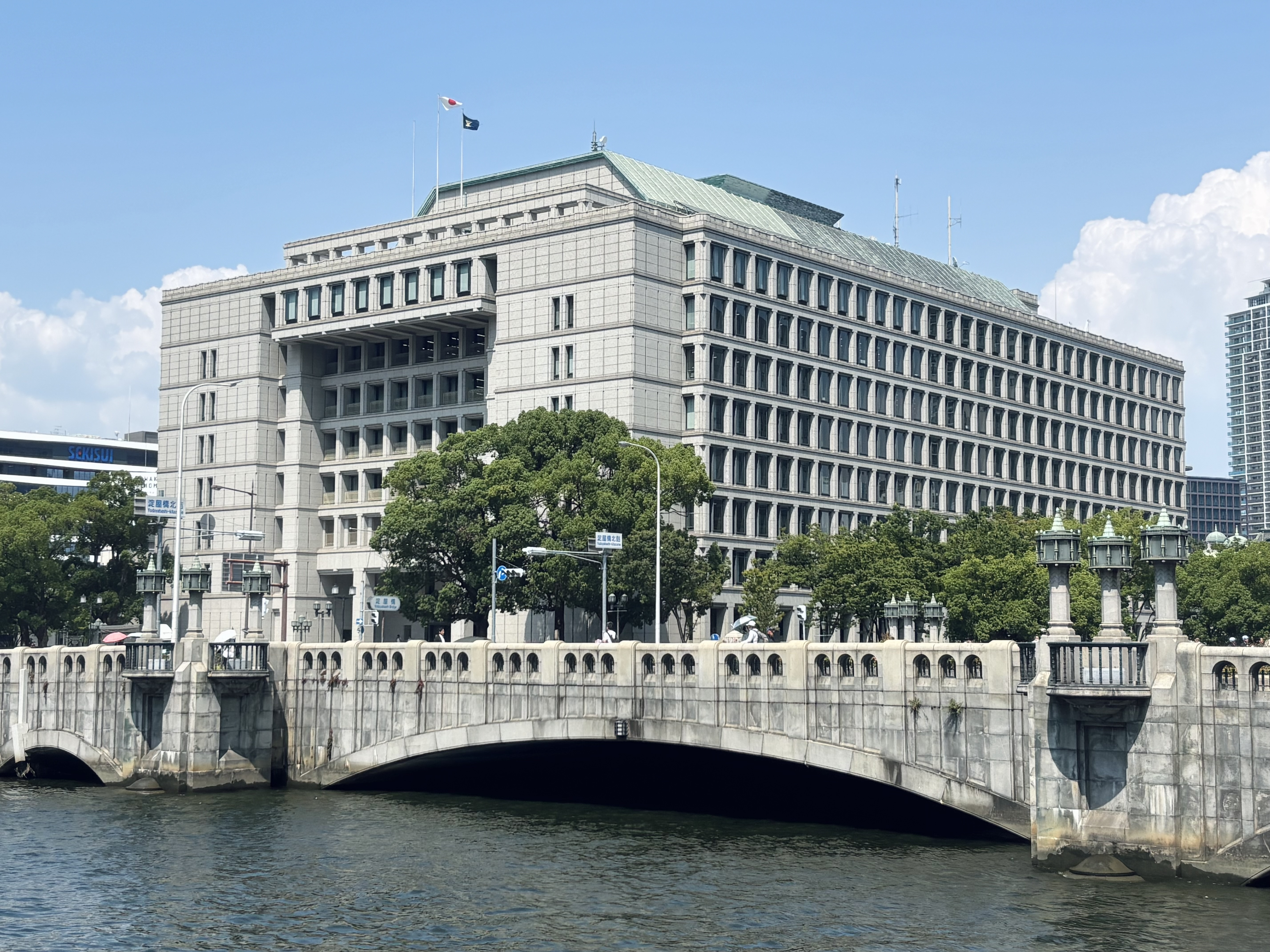
- Japan, Osaka City Hall, Osaka Prefecture, Osaka City, Kita Ward, Nakanoshima, 1-3-20.

Website
- Official website

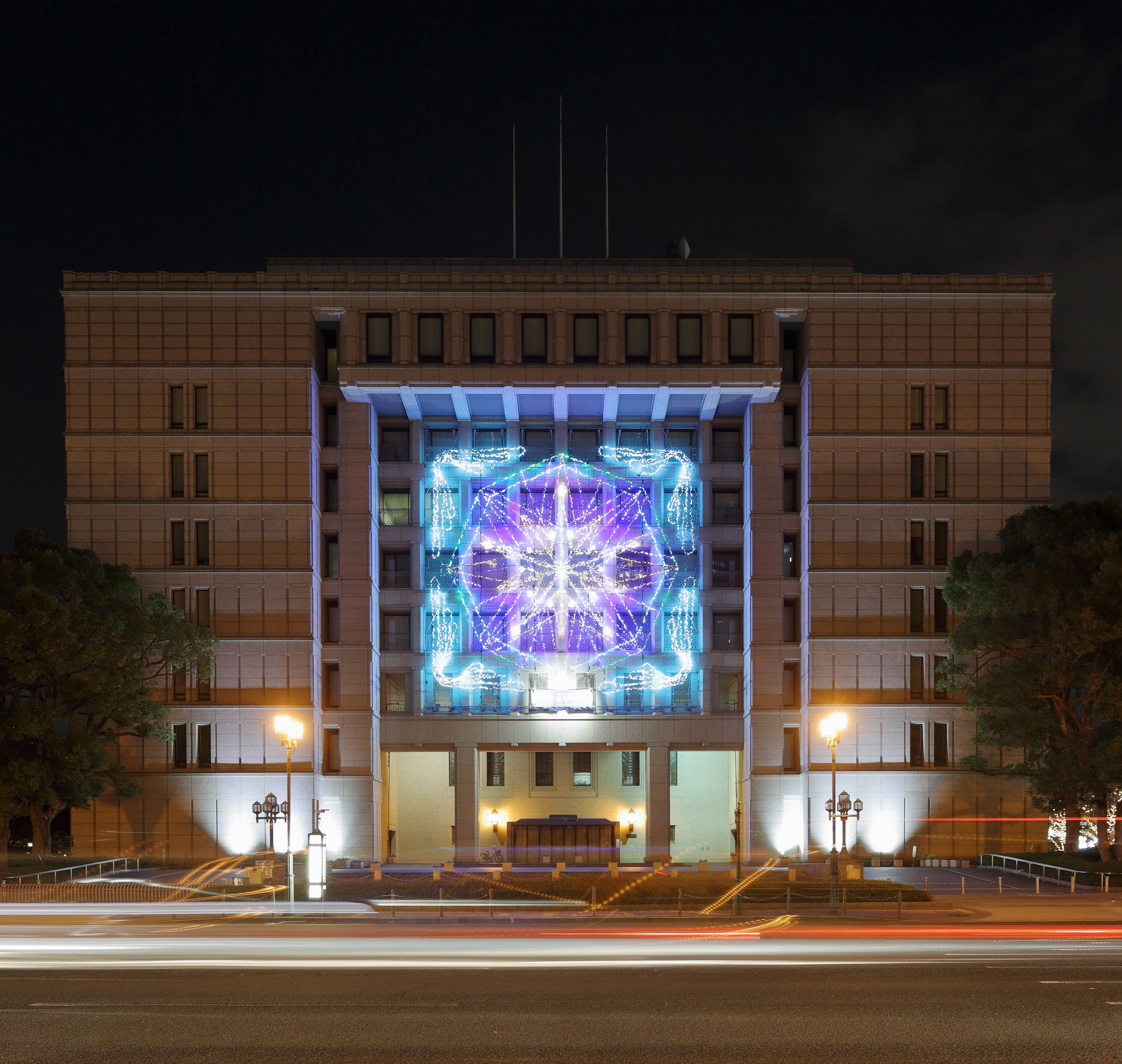
Osaka City Hall (2016)

The Osaka City Council (大阪市会, Ōsaka-shi kai) is the legislature of Osaka City. It is responsible for the "enactment, amendment and repeal of ordinances, budgetary decisions, approval of account settlements, matters of financial importances including acquisition and disposal of city assets, and others." The assembly has a regular membership 81 members, with 41 needed to form a majority.

== Overview ==
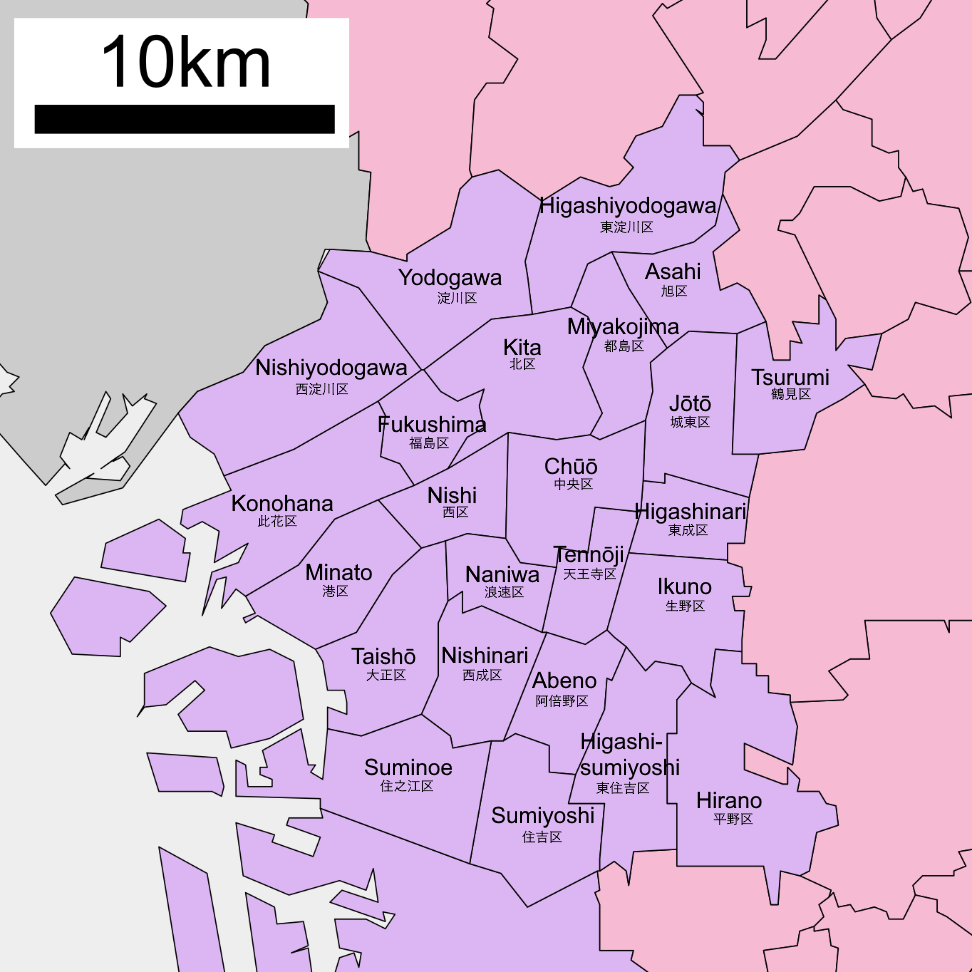
Map of Council districts

The Osaka City Council consists of 81 members who serve four-year terms. Councilors are elected under a medium-size constituency system using the single non-transferable vote. As of May 2021, it is presided over by President Kazutaka Ohashi of the Osaka Restoration Association, with Teruaki Nishizaki of Komeito serving as Vice-President.

The municipal government consists of 24 electoral districts, representing the 24 administrative wards of the city. The number of members elected from each district is proportional to the ward's population.

Members are elected to four-year terms with no term limits. Japanese citizens of voting age who have been living in Osaka city continuously for three months have the right to vote in municipal government elections, and people with voting rights who are at least 25 years old may stand as candidates.

Members meet quarterly for the regular assembly, additional extraordinary sessions are also held. There are six standing committees of the Osaka municipal government: Finance and General Affairs, Education and Economic Affairs, Public Welfare and Health, Planning and Fire Defense, Construction and Port, and Transport and Waterworks.

The municipal government meets on the 7th (government library, special committee room) and 8th (meeting hall, committee room, city government secretariat, president's office) floors of Osaka City Hall.

== Salary ==
As of May 2025, the council members receive salaries of:

Position	Monthly remuneration	Annual bonus	Government activity allowance
President	¥950,000	¥5,119,200	¥570,000 / month
Vice-President	¥844,000	¥4,550,400	¥570,000 / month
Member	¥774,000	¥4,171,200	¥570,000 / month

== Current composition ==
Municipal assembly election was held on 9 April 2023 as a part of the 20th unified local elections. Prior to the election, the council was reduced in size from 83 to 81 seats.

The Osaka Restoration Association won an outright majority, as it holds in the Osaka Prefectural Assembly, gaining six seats. The party therefore no longer needs to rely on the support of Komeito.

The 9 April 2023 general election of members of the council gave the following result:

Results of the 2023 Osaka City Council election
Party	Seats	Change
Osaka Restoration Association (大阪維新の会, Ōsaka Ishin no Kai)	46	▲6
Komeito (公明党, Kōmeitō)	18	
Liberal Democratic Party (自由民主党, Jiyūminshutō)	11	▼6
Japanese Communist Party (日本共産党, Nihon Kyōsantō)	2	▼2
Independents	4	
Total	81	
