= Osaka Restoration Association =

Regional political party in Osaka Prefecture, Japan

Osaka Restoration Association 大阪維新の会
- Leader: Hirofumi Yoshimura
- Secretary-General: Hideyuki Yokoyama
- Founder: Tōru Hashimoto
- Founded: 19 April 2010
- Split from: Liberal Democratic Party
- Headquarters: Osaka, Osaka Prefecture
- Ideology: Regionalism; Economic liberalism
- Political position: Centre-right
- National affiliation: Japan Restoration (2012–2014); Japan Innovation (2014–2015); Nippon Ishin (since 2015)
- Colours: Green
- Osaka Prefectural Assembly seats: 51 / 88
- Osaka City Council seats: 46 / 81
- Sakai City Assembly seats: 18 / 46

Website
- oneosaka.jp

The Osaka Restoration Association (大阪維新の会, Ōsaka Ishin no Kai), also referred to as One Osaka, is a regional political party in Osaka Prefecture, Japan. Founded in 2010 by then-Governor Tōru Hashimoto, its main platform is pursuing the Osaka Metropolis plan of merging the prefecture and some of its cities into "One Osaka", reducing overlapping bureaucratic organizations of the prefecture and the city of Osaka, towards Dōshūsei.

The party is a major force in the politics within Osaka Prefecture, with the party holding the most seats in the Osaka Prefectural Assembly, Osaka City Assembly and Sakai City Assembly, as well as the positions of Governor of Osaka and mayor of three cities within the prefecture (Osaka, Moriguchi and Hirakata).

== History ==
Hashimoto, a lawyer and popular TV personality, was elected Governor of Osaka in January 2008 with the support of the local branches of the Liberal Democratic Party and New Komeito. However, his support for the Osaka Metropolis plan and the restructuring of Japan's 47 prefectures into a few number of geographically large regions saw him face opposition from the mayors of Osaka and Sakai cities. In face of this opposition and frustrated with the lack of attention given to the issues by the major parties at the national level, Hashimoto announced his intention to form a regional party that would focus on the betterment of Osaka.

In February 2009, Hashimoto's plan for the prefecture to purchase the Osaka World Trade Center Building from the city and relocate the prefectural government offices into the building was defeated in the prefectural assembly. Following this, a faction of six assembly members led by Ichirō Matsui, who was supported by Hashimoto, formed the "Liberal Democratic Party Restoration Association" (自由民主党・維新の会). By April 2010 the group had broken away from the Liberal Democratic Party and expanded to 22 members. On 19 April 2010 it was officially registered as the Osaka Restoration Association with 30 members.

In the unified local elections in April 2011, the Osaka Restoration Association won an outright majority in the prefectural assembly and became strongest party in the assemblies of both Osaka City and Sakai City. On November 27, 2011, in an unprecedented double election, Hashimoto and Secretary-General Ichirō Matsui were elected as Mayor of Osaka City and Governor of Osaka Prefecture respectively.

When the Japan Restoration Association, also headed by Hashimoto and Matsui, was founded in 2012 it was announced that the Osaka organization would come under the umbrella of the national party.

In the Sakai city mayoral election held in September 2013, incumbent Osami Takeyama ran as an independent (with the support of the Liberal Democratic Party and an endorsement from the Komeito party) and defeated the Osaka Restoration Association candidate Katsutoshi Nishibayashi. Takeyama first won office in 2009 with the backing of Hashimoto (prior to the party being formed), but lost the support of the party when he changed his position regarding the Metropolis merger plan. Whilst generally in favour of reform within the prefecture, Takeyama opposed the break-up of Sakai city and had a campaign slogan of "Sakai is One" (堺はひとつ, Sakai wa hitotsu). This was the first time in the party's history that a candidate had lost a mayoral election. Takeyama received 50.69% of the vote, almost 7% more than in 2009.

In 2015, with Hashimoto as Mayor of Osaka city and Matsui as Governor of Osaka Prefecture, the party promoted a merger plan that, if successful, would see the relationship between the 24 municipalities of Osaka and the prefecture be changed to resemble that of the Tokyo metropolis and create four new semi-autonomous districts. The plan was defeated in a referendum in May 2015 by a margin of less than 1%. Following the result, Hashimoto announced he would not contest the mayoral election at the end of 2015.

The party successfully contested the "double election" of the Osaka city mayoral election and prefecture gubernatorial election held on 22 November 2015. In the mayoral election, Hirofumi Yoshimura, a former member of the national House of Representatives, was selected as the party's candidate to replace Hashimoto. Yoshimura ran on a platform of reinstating the metropolis merger plan and received 56.4% of the 1.05 million votes cast. In the gubernatorial election, Matsui also campaigned in favour of the merger and was re-elected with 64% of the 3.14 million votes cast. The double victory has been considered a boost to the party's main policy of resurrecting the metropolis merger plan.

== Presidents ==
No.	Name	Image	Term of office		National affiliation
No.	Name	Image	Took office	Left office	National affiliation
1	Tōru Hashimoto		19 April 2010	December 2015	Restoration Party (12 September 2012 – 22 September 2014); Innovation Party (22 September 2014 – 27 August 2015)
2	Ichirō Matsui		December 2015	November 2020	Innovation Party (27 August 2015 – 2 November 2015); Ishin no Kai (2 November 2015 – present)

== Election results ==
=== Gubernatorial Elections ===
Election	Candidate	Votes	%	Result
2011	Ichiro Matsui	2,006,195	54.73%	Won
2015	Ichiro Matsui	2,025,387	64.1%	Won
2019	Hirofumi Yoshimura	2,266,103	64.37%	Won
2023	Hirofumi Yoshimura	2,439,444	73.7%	Won
2026	Hirofumi Yoshimura	3,024,106	83.2%	Won

=== Prefectural Assembly Elections ===
Election	Leader	Votes	%	Seats	+/–	Position	Result
2011	Tōru Hashimoto	—N/a	—N/a	57 / 109	▲28	▲1st	Majority
2015	Tōru Hashimoto	—N/a	—N/a	42 / 88	▼15	1st	Minority
2019	Ichirō Matsui	1,530,336	50.72%	51 / 88	▲11	1st	Majority
2023	Hirofumi Yoshimura	1,581,874	58.21%	55 / 79	▲9	1st	Majority

=== Osaka City Council Elections ===
Election	Leader	Votes	%	Seats	+/–	Position	Result
2023	Hirofumi Yoshimura	—N/a	—N/a	46 / 81	▲6	1st	Majority
