= Taishō-ku =

Ward of Osaka, Japan

Coordinates: 34°39′01″N 135°28′22″E

Location of Taishō-ku in Osaka City

Taishō (大正区, Taishō-ku) is one of 24 wards of Osaka, Japan. As of October 1, 2006, the ward has an estimated population of 72,742 and the total area is 9.43 km^{2}. Taisho is surrounded by canals and it is named after the Taisho bridge, a main bridge built in Taishō period. One fourth of residents have their roots in Okinawa Prefecture, and there are many stores associated with Okinawan culture and Okinawan cuisine in Taisho.

== Transport ==
Taishō on the Osaka Loop Line railway and the Nagahori Tsurumi-ryokuchi Line subway is located at the northern tip of the ward. The rest of the ward is served by the bus lines operated by Osaka City Bus. As the ward is surrounded by rivers with few bridges for pedestrians, the city provides ferry services.

=== Train Stations ===
West Japan Railway Company (JR West)
Osaka Loop Line

Taishō

Osaka Metro
Nagahori Tsurumi-ryokuchi Line

Taishō Station

=== Road ===
- Hanshin Expressway: Route 17 Nishi-Osaka Line
- Japan National Route 43
- Onami Street
- Taishō Street
- Kaigan Street

=== Airport ===
In the south end of the ward is Funamachi industrial area and at the foot of the Shin Kizugawa Bridge was the site of Kizugawa Airport, which was Osaka's main civilian airport from 1929 until Itami Airport opened in 1939. It began as a seaplane base in 1923 (flights to Tokushima naval air base, Takamatsu, Matsuyama and Beppu) but expanded by Ministry of Communications to support Japan Air Transport (JAT) flights to Tachikawa Army Airfield in Tokyo with a 720 metres (2,360 ft) runway. The airport briefly used by JAT successor Imperial Japanese Airways until Itami opened in 1939.

== Education ==
Public elementary and junior high schools are operated by the Osaka City Board of Education.

=== Elementary schools ===
- Sangenyanishi Elementary School (三軒家西小学校)
- Izuohigashi Elementary School (泉尾東小学校)
- Nakaizuo Elementary School (中泉尾小学校)
- Kitaokajima Elementary School (北恩加島小学校)
- Minamiokajima Elementary School (南恩加島小学校)
- Tsurumachi Elementary School (鶴町小学校)
- Izuokita Elementary School (泉尾北小学校)
- Hirao Elementary School (平尾小学校)
- Sangenyahigashi Elementary School (三軒家東小学校)
- Kobayashi Elementary School (小林小学校)
- Tsuruhama Elementary School (鶴浜小学校)

=== Junior high schools ===
- Taishōhigashi Junior High School (大正東中学校)
- Taishōchūō Junior High School (大正中央中学校)
- Taishōnishi Junior High School (大正西中学校)
- Taishōkita Junior High School (大正北中学校)

=== High schools ===
- Osaka Municipal Izuo Technology High School (大阪市立泉尾工業高等学校)
- Osaka Prefectural Izuo High School (大阪府立泉尾高等学校)
- Osaka Prefectural Taisho High School (大阪府立大正高等学校)

=== Vocational schools ===
- Osaka Animal Plants Ocean College (大阪動植物海洋専門学校)
- Japan MotorSports College (日本モータースポーツ専門学校)

== Facilities ==
=== Libraries ===
- Osaka Municipal Taisho Library (大阪市立大正図書館)

=== Parks ===
- Mount Shōwa (Chishima Park) (昭和山 (千島公園))

=== Sports venues ===
- Azalea Taishō (アゼリア大正): The venue has a hall.
- Marine Tennis Park Kitamura (マリンテニスパーク・北村)

=== Hospitals ===
- Taishō Hospital (大正病院)
- Pref Osaka Saiseikai Izuo Hospital (大阪府済生会泉尾病院)

=== Department Store ===
- Chishima Garden Mall (千島ガーデンモール), shopping mall
- IKEA store (Tsuruhama)
