= Japan Innovation Party =

Political party in Japan

Japan Innovation Party 日本維新の会 Nippon Ishin no Kai
- Abbreviation: Ishin; JIP
- Leader: Hirofumi Yoshimura
- Co-Leader: Fumitake Fujita
- Secretary-General: Hiroshi Nakatsuka
- Founders: Ichirō Matsui; Tōru Hashimoto
- Founded: 2 November 2015
- Split from: Japan Innovation Party
- Headquarters: Osaka, Osaka Prefecture, Japan
- Newspaper: Nippon Ishin
- Student wing: Ishin Students
- Ideology: Libertarian conservatism; Neoliberalism; Economic liberalism; Right-wing populism
- Political position: Centre-right to right-wing
- National affiliation: LDP–JIP coalition (2025–)
- Regional affiliation: Osaka Restoration Association
- Colours: Lime green
- Slogan: 動かすぞ、維新が。 ugokasu zo, ishin ga. ('Get things moving, Ishin will')
- Senators: 19 / 248
- Representatives: 36 / 465
- Prefectural assembly members: 74 / 2,614
- Municipal assembly members: 419 / 28,940

Website
- Japanese; o-ishin.jp; English; o-ishin.jp/en/
- Politics of Japan; Political parties; Elections; A: The party is commonly seen in Japanese and Western media as centre-right. The party is sometimes described as far-right by South Korean outlets.

The Japan Innovation Party (Japanese: 日本維新の会, Hepburn: Nippon Ishin no Kai; Japan Restoration Association) is a political party in Japan based in Osaka, variously described as conservative, centre-right, right-wing, and right-wing populist.

The party was founded in October 2015, as Initiatives from Osaka, from a split in the old Japan Innovation Party. It ended up becoming the third-largest opposition party in the National Diet following the 2016 House of Councillors election. In the 2017 general election, the party won 11 seats, down from the 14 it held previously. In the 2019 House of Councillors election, it won 4 new seats. In the 2021 general election, the party gained 30 seats, becoming the third-largest party in the chamber, winning nearly all seats in Osaka while also expanding its representation outside the prefecture. In the 2024 general election, it lost several of its seats but kept its dominance in Osaka. In 2025, the party formed a governing coalition together with the Liberal Democratic Party (LDP) following the collapse of the 26-year-long LDP–Komeito coalition.

The Japan Innovation Party advocates decentralization, federalism (Dōshūsei), and limited government policies. It argues to remove defense spending limits, and stands with the LDP on revising the constitution. The party also supports socially liberal policies such as expanded LGBTQ protections and same-sex marriages, while also backing free high school education. The party has represented a form of right-wing populism that until 2025 opposed the LDP's entrenched control over Japanese politics and bureaucracy, known as the 1955 System.

== History ==
In August 2015, Secretary General Kakizawa Mito endorsed a candidate jointly backed by the Japanese Communist Party and the Democratic Party of Japan in the Yamagata mayoral election, exposing internal divisions within the Restoration Party. On 28 August, Tōru Hashimoto and his close ally and advisor, Osaka Governor Ichirō Matsui, announced their departure from the party. The following day, Hashimoto declared his intent to establish a new political party. The announcement was supported by House of Councillors member Toranosuke Katayama and other Osaka-based lawmakers. Plans were made to call the new party the "Osaka Restoration Party" (おおさか維新の会), and preparations began for a formal split from the existing party structure.

By October, the talks had broken down, prompting the national leadership of the Japan Innovation Party to expel members of the Diet and local assemblies who were expected to align with Hashimoto's new group. However, Osaka-based Diet members contested the expulsions, arguing they were legally invalid since, after 1 October, the party no longer had a valid executive structure. As a result, the expelled members filed a formal appeal against the decision. In protest, five House of Councillors members, affiliated with Katayama, voluntarily withdrew from the parliamentary faction on 16 October, forming a new "Restoration Party (House of Councillors)" faction.

On 31 October 2015, Hashimoto and Matsui officially launched Initiatives from Osaka (おおさか維新の会, Ōsaka Ishin no Kai) during a meeting in Osaka, following their departure from the Japan Innovation Party. The name was derived from the Osaka Restoration Association, also founded by Hashimoto, but distinguished by the use of hiragana (おおさか) instead of kanji (大阪). Hashimoto was named party leader, Matsui became secretary-general, and 19 Diet members—mostly from Osaka—joined the new party. The "Osaka Restoration Association" was officially registered on 2 November.

The first significant election contested by the party was the July 2016 House of Councillors election. The party saw strong results in the Kansai region, winning two of the four seats in the Osaka at-large district and one of three in the Hyogo at-large district. In the national proportional representation block, the party placed fifth with 5,153,584 votes (9.2%), earning 4 out of 48 seats. The party's support was especially concentrated in Osaka, where it received 1,293,626 votes (34.9%), and it ranked second in Hyogo Prefecture with 470,526 votes (19.5%). The gains positioned the party as the third-largest opposition force in the National Diet.

Despite success in Kansai, Matsui declared the party's overall performance insufficient for a national political force. On 12 July, he announced plans to rename the party to broaden its appeal across Japan. An internal poll among Diet members and regional representatives shortlisted three names, with "Nippon Ishin no Kai" (Japan Restoration Party) emerging as the most supported. On 23 August 2016, during a special convention in Osaka City, the party formally adopted the new name: Nippon Ishin no Kai (日本維新の会). Matsui continued as party leader, and the party unveiled a new logo similar to its previous design, replacing the word "Osaka" with "Japan."

=== 2017 elections ===
In January 2017, Nippon Ishin no Kai announced plans to field candidates for the Tokyo Metropolitan Assembly election scheduled for that summer. However, after Tokyo Governor Yuriko Koike and her party, the Tokyo Citizens First Association, declared they would not coordinate efforts, potential post-election cooperation was considered. On 22 June, Vice President Kimi Watanabe publicly expressed support for the Tokyo Citizens First Association and resigned. He was expelled from the party that same day. In the July 2 Tokyo Assembly election, despite support from party leader Matsui and Osaka Mayor Hirofumi Yoshimura, only one of Ishin's four official candidates was elected, leaving its seat count unchanged. On 30 September, the Kibō no Tō (Party of Hope) was established with Matsui named its representative. Tokyo Governor Yuriko Koike announced electoral cooperation between her party and Ishin for the 48th general election on 22 October. As part of the agreement, the Party of Hope did not run candidates in Osaka, while Ishin withdrew its Tokyo candidates.

On 6 February, Yutaka Hasegawa, a former Fuji TV announcer, joined the party. On 28 January, he was named the branch chief for the Chiba 1st district and declared his candidacy for the next House of Representatives election. On 25 March, the party held its annual convention in Tokyo for the first time—traditionally held in Osaka—in anticipation of the upcoming election. During the event, six official candidates and the party's Tokyo manifesto were announced.

During the general election on 22 October, the party secured only three seats, all from single-member districts in Osaka Prefecture, and faced challenges in its stronghold, ultimately obtaining 11 seats, including eight proportional representation seats, down from 14 in the previous election. The absence of Hashimoto, the former representative, the unsuccessful alliance with the Party of Hope, and the rise of the Constitutional Democratic Party of Japan were cited as contributing factors to this outcome. On 26 January, Hodaka Maruyama, a member of the House of Representatives, tweeted: "Regardless of Representative Matsui's re-election, we need a summary of the Sakai mayoral election, the House of Representatives election, and the representative election." When Hashimoto called for a representative election, he remarked, "You won because Mr. Matsui is the governor. There's a way to express your desire to be elected. Bokeh!" He also stated, "It's detrimental to my mental health to interact with a Diet member who makes foolish comments. I despise such parliamentarians," and declared his resignation as a legal advisor to the Japan Restoration Association.

Maruyama countered with accusations of "voter slander" and intolerance for being falsely represented. He initially submitted a resignation notice, but after Ishin retained the notice, Maruyama retracted it in January 2018. On 28 January, the Standing Committee convened, and an extraordinary party convention was scheduled for November according to the party statute. The convention's agenda included a policy decision on whether to conduct a representative election. On 25 November, following the general election results, an extraordinary party congress took place. The majority voted against holding a representative election, and Ichiro Matsui was confirmed to continue in his representation role.

=== 2019 unified local elections and House of Councillors election ===
On 23 January 2019, the House of Councillors representatives formed a unified parliamentary faction with the Party of Hope. Consequently, the total number of members reached 15, including Kazuyuki Yamaguchi who had joined the Restoration Party that month, overtaking the Japan Communist Party's 14 members to become the third-largest opposition party. During the 19th unified local elections in April, the Party of Hope was joined by New Party Daichi in Hokkaido and Tax Reduction Japan in Aichi Prefecture. In Osaka Prefecture, the stronghold, Governor Matsui was elected as the mayor of Osaka, while Mayor Yoshimura won the gubernatorial election, both securing large margins over their opponents. The Osaka Prefectural Assembly and City Council saw an increase in seats, yet the party failed to win any prefectural elections outside its base, highlighting a limited national reach.

After the passing of House of Representatives member Tomokatsu Kitagawa from the Liberal Democratic Party, Fujita Fumitake emerged victorious in the by-election for Osaka's 12th district on 21 April 2019. He triumphed over competitors including Shinpei Kitagawa, who is the nephew of the late Kitagawa, as well as Shinji Tarutoko and Takeshi Miyamoto. On 14 May, during a visa-free visit to the Four Northern Islands as part of an exchange project, Hodaka Maruyama disrupted a reporter's interview with islanders. He suggested "recapture by war" to resolve the Northern Territories issue. Maruyama refused to accept his resignation notice, and the board of directors subsequently expelled him. Following this, a bipartisan resolution condemning Maruyama's actions was submitted and unanimously passed in the House of Representatives on June 6.

=== 2020: Tokyo gubernatorial election, second referendum rejection, and Matsui's retirement from politics ===
In the Tokyo gubernatorial election on 5 July 2020, Taisuke Ono, the former Deputy Governor of Kumamoto Prefecture, was a recommended candidate. Although a relative unknown, he secured 610,000 votes. However, he narrowly missed the threshold to retain his deposit, finishing in fourth place. Concurrently, in the Tokyo Metropolitan Assembly by-election, official candidates were fielded in the Kita Ward and Ota Ward constituencies, but both were defeated, with two LDP candidates winning the seats.

On 1 November 2020, the second referendum on the Osaka Metropolitan Plan, a key policy of Ishin no Kai, was rejected by a majority. That same day, Matsui announced his plan to retire from politics at the end of his mayoral term in April 2023. He also stated his resignation as president of the regional "Osaka Ishin no Kai", appointing Hirofumi Yoshimura as his successor. As for "Ishin no Kai" the national political party, he expressed a desire to consider his role separately from the Osaka Ishin no Kai and indicated he would continue in his position for the time being.

=== 2021: Local elections, breakthrough at the 2021 general election, and new executive team ===
==== Local elections ====
In the Hokkaido 2nd district by-election on 25 April 2021, following Takamori Yoshikawa's resignation from the Liberal Democratic Party, former provincial councilor Izumi Yamazaki was defended. Muneo Suzuki, leader of the Hokkaido Restoration Party, supported the defense, stating "a conservative centrist receptacle is necessary" after the Liberal Democratic Party's defeat. However, Kenko Matsuki was elected, with Yamazaki finishing third and Yoshiko Tsuruha, an independent, as the runner-up.

In the Takarazuka mayoral election in Hyogo Prefecture on 11 April 2021, Takashi Kado, a prefectural councilor from Takarazuka City, was officially nominated by his party. It was the first such nomination since the Takarazuka City and Itami City mayoral elections in 2013, which served as a prelude to the Hyogo gubernatorial election. Despite a vigorous campaign, Kado was narrowly defeated by Harue Yamazaki. For the Hyogo gubernatorial election, the Hyogo Restoration Association intended to nominate its own candidate since late 2020, but faced coordination challenges. In April 2021, a faction of the LDP Hyogo Prefectural Assembly opposed the executive department's policy and recommended Motohiko Saito, then head of the Osaka Prefectural Finance Division. In the Tokyo Metropolitan Assembly election, 13 official candidates were fielded. On 3 July, the day before the vote count, Matsui and Yoshimura delivered speeches in Tokyo to support their candidates. However, only one seat was secured, leading Matsui to comment on the difficulty of elections in Tokyo.

==== Breakthrough at the 2021 general election ====
On 22 August, Secretary-General Baba discussed the government's framework on a TV program, hinting at potential cooperation with the ruling party after the upcoming general election of the House of Representatives. He suggested that if allowed to pursue their desired policies, various forms of collaboration could be considered. On the 26th, Representative Matsui, reflecting on Baba's comments, stated there was no conflict with the Liberal Democratic Party and dismissed any coalition or cooperation with Jiko. Additionally, Matsui supported Prime Minister Yoshihide Suga's re-election in the LDP presidential election, citing the ease of collaboration between national and local governments, especially in combating the new coronavirus.

In the recent general election, the party significantly increased its representation from 11 to 41 seats. In its stronghold of Osaka Prefecture, the party's candidates won in all but four of the 15 single-member districts, which were ceded to Komeito. Outside of the Osaka-Hyogo 6th district, the party also performed well in the Hanshin area. Nationally, the party improved its proportional representation vote tally by nearly 5 million from the previous election, securing 8.05 million votes and seats in 10 out of 11 national blocks, excluding Hokkaido. Remarkably, in the proportional representation stronghold, the party secured 10 seats, the highest among the 28 available, outperforming the LDP's 8 seats. Due to the lack of proportionally restored members from Osaka Prefecture, candidates from other prefectures were eligible for proportional revival. Consequently, all candidates from Hyogo Prefecture, except for the 6th district, were proportionally reinstated.

On the same day as the general election, Matsui announced his retirement from politics at the end of his mayoral term, stating it would be irresponsible to continue as a representative. He confirmed he would step down from his role when his term concludes in January the following year. Party regulations required a decision on holding a representative election within 45 days after a major election. However, during an extraordinary party congress on 27 November, a vote among special party members, including National Assembly members and local councilors, resulted in 151 votes for and 319 against the election. Consequently, no representative election was held, and Matsui remained in the race. Furthermore, due to health issues, Toranosuke Katayama stepped down as co-representative, and Matsui suggested appointing Secretary-General Nobuyuki Baba as his successor.

During the Standing Board of Directors meeting held on 30 November, Baba was officially appointed as the co-chair. Additionally, Fumitake Fujita, a member of the House of Representatives, and Shun Otokita, a member of the House of Councillors, were appointed as the chairman of the general affairs committee. Hirofumi Yanagase, also a member of the House of Councillors, was named the secretary-general. The appointments for the Diet delegation were confirmed on the same day.

=== 2023: Major unified election gains ===
In April 2023, the party made significant gains in local elections, more than doubling its seat totals in various local assemblies to 124. Notably, the party also captured the governorship of Nara prefecture through its candidate Makoto Yamashita. Two weeks later the party's candidate Yumi Hayashi took Wakayama 1st district in a by-election.

=== 2025: Governing coalition with the LDP ===
After Prime Minister Shigeru Ishiba was replaced as president of the Liberal Democratic Party (LDP) by Sanae Takaichi on 4 October 2025, Komeito (the LDP's longtime coalition partner) announced it would leave the government, as it refused to support Takaichi as Prime Minister. On 15 October, Takaichi asked Ishin leader Hirofumi Yoshimura to enter into a coalition with the LDP. Around the same time, Jun Azumi, the Secretary-General of the Constitutional Democratic Party (CDP), was calling for opposition unity in the upcoming vote for Prime Minister. His proposal was for the opposition bloc to collectively back Yuichiro Tamaki, the leader of the Democratic Party for the People (DPP), rather than the CDP's own leader, Yoshihiko Noda. Had the JIP aligned with this move, there was a significant possibility that Tamaki, rather than Takaichi, would have been elected Prime Minister. However, the JIP ultimately rejected the opposition's overtures and chose to align with the LDP. On 19 October, it was announced that the LDP and the JIP agreed to form a coalition, but without any Ishin members serving in the Takaichi Cabinet. The following day, Takaichi was confirmed as the country's first female prime minister.

== Ideology, platform, and policy ==
Views on the political position of the JIP have been varied, variously described as conservative, centre-right, and right-wing. While it has been described as being neoconservative, and also as right-wing populist by its opponents, the party itself commits to reformism, regionalism, and "self-sustainability" in its party constitution. The party has represented a form of right-wing populism that until 2025 opposed the LDP's entrenched control over Japanese politics and bureaucracy, known as the 1955 System.

The party supports the amendment of the Japanese constitution, including the installation of a constitutional court, mandated free education, and increased devolution. The party has not made an official stance on either supporting or opposing the amendment to Article 9 of the Japanese constitution, which prohibits Japan from possessing an offensive military, however it has pledged to partake in debate. Economically, the party supports increased economic liberalisation, including deregulation of the labour market and the streamlining of bureaucratic structure, and optional separate surnames for married couples. The party also supports socially liberal policies such as expanded LGBTQ protections and same-sex marriages, while also backing free high school education.

In 2022, the party was described as centrist and moderate, being perceived as such by the voter base according to public opinion polls at the time. The party was also referred to as libertarian. The party manifesto for the 2022 Japanese Councillors election, dubbed "維新八策2022", containing 402 individual policy proposals, and included the following pledges:

- Reform of social insurance and pension system, with the introduction of a universal basic income of ¥60,000 per month, with additional supplements for non-coupled elderly.
- Reform of income tax and social insurance fees, replacing the current system with a two-tiered income tax.
- Reform of the social medical insurance system from age-based subsidy rates to income-based cost subsidies.
- Universal access to free education from preschool to university, written within the constitution.
- Free access to childbirth services through a combination of insurance and voucher system.
- Deregulation of protected industries such as ridesharing, finance and agriculture.
- Legalization of separate surname options for married couples.
- Maintaining current emission reduction targets with implementation of carbon pricing schemes.
- Legislating Osaka as the vice-capital of Japan.
- Push for further devolution with merger of prefectures into states (dōshūsei), while allocating the consumption tax as a regional tax.
- Constitutional amendments including: Universal free education, devolution, and the establishment of constitutional courts.
- Maintaining agnate succession of the Imperial throne while considering re-royalisation of former Imperial household members.
- Introduction of the "2:1 rule", requiring two pieces of regulation to be removed per introduction of any new industrial regulation.
- Deregulation of the workforce, allowing for compensated dismissals.
- Repealing the 1% GDP cap on defence spending, aiming for 2% spending and the establishment of a national intelligence organisation.
- Promotion of free trade, especially within the Asia-pacific region.
- Adding hospital capacity for COVID-19 treatment through controls over privately run hospitals.
- Temporary cuts to reduction rate (a 2% consumption tax discount on consumption tax, such as groceries) on consumption tax rate from 8% down to 3%, to counter inflation.
- 30% reduction in diet members, and a 30% cut in member's compensation.
- Contributions reform prohibiting corporate and organisational donation loopholes to political parties and candidates.
- Establishment of a public documents bureau, digitalisation of all public document, and maintaining edit records through utilisation of blockchain technology.

== Leadership ==
=== Current leadership ===
| Position | Name |
|---|---|
| Leader | Hirofumi Yoshimura |
| Co-Leader and Parliamentary Leader | Fumitake Fujita |
| Secretary-General | Hiroshi Nakatsuka |
| Chairman of the Policy Research Council | Alex Saito |
| Chairman of the General Affairs Committee | Kaori Takagi |
| Chairman of the Diet Affairs Committee | Takashi Endo |
| Chairman of the House of Councillors Caucus | Hitoshi Asada |

== Party leaders ==
| Leaders | | Took office | Left office |
|---|---|---|---|
| Tōru Hashimoto | | 2 November 2015 | 12 December 2015 |
| Ichirō Matsui | | 12 December 2015 | 23 August 2016 |
| Ichirō Matsui | Toranosuke Katayama | 23 August 2016 | 27 November 2021 |
| Ichirō Matsui | Nobuyuki Baba | 27 November 2021 | 27 August 2022 |
| Nobuyuki Baba | | 27 August 2022 | 1 December 2024 |
| Hirofumi Yoshimura | Seiji Maehara | 1 December 2024 | 8 August 2025 |
| Hirofumi Yoshimura | Fumitake Fujita | 8 August 2025 | Incumbent |

== Election results ==
=== House of Representatives ===
| Election | Leader | Constituency | | | | Party list | | | | Total | | Position | Status |
| Election | Leader | Votes | % | Seats | +/- | Votes | % | Seats | +/- | Seats | +/- | Position | Status |
|---|---|---|---|---|---|---|---|---|---|---|---|---|---|
| 2017 | Ichirō Matsui | 1,765,053 | 3.18 | 3 / 289 | new | 3,387,097 | 6.07 | 8 / 176 | new | 11 / 465 | new | 6th | Opposition |
| 2021 | Ichirō Matsui | 4,802,793 | 8.36 | 16 / 289 | ▲13 | 8,050,830 | 14.0 | 25 / 176 | ▲17 | 41 / 465 | ▲30 | 3rd | Opposition |
| 2024 | Nobuyuki Baba | 6,048,104 | 11.15 | 23 / 289 | ▲7 | 5,105,127 | 9.36 | 15 / 176 | ▼10 | 38 / 465 | ▼3 | 3rd | Opposition (until 2025) |
| 2024 | Nobuyuki Baba | 6,048,104 | 11.15 | 23 / 289 | ▲7 | 5,105,127 | 9.36 | 15 / 176 | ▼10 | 38 / 465 | ▼3 | 3rd | LDP–JIP governing coalition (2025–2026) |
| 2026 | Hirofumi Yoshimura; Fumitake Fujita | 3,742,161 | 6.63 | 20 / 289 | ▼3 | 4,943,330 | 8.63 | 16 / 176 | ▲1 | 36 / 465 | ▼2 | 3rd | LDP–JIP governing coalition |

=== House of Councillors ===
| Election | Leader | Constituency | | | | Party list | | | | Seats | | | | Position | Status |
| Election | Leader | Votes | % | Seats | +/- | Votes | % | Seats | +/- | Won | +/- | Total | +/- | Position | Status |
|---|---|---|---|---|---|---|---|---|---|---|---|---|---|---|---|
| 2016 | Ichirō Matsui; Toranosuke Katayama | 3,303,419 | 5.84 | 3 / 73 | new | 5,153,584 | 9.20 | 4 / 48 | new | 7 / 121 | new | 12 / 242 | ▲7 | 5th | Opposition |
| 2019 | Ichirō Matsui; Toranosuke Katayama | 3,664,530 | 7.28 | 5 / 74 | new | 4,907,844 | 9.80 | 5 / 50 | new | 10 / 124 | new | 16 / 245 | ▲4 | 4th | Opposition |
| 2022 | Ichirō Matsui | 5,533,657 | 10.41 | 5 / 74 | ▲2 | 7,845,985 | 14.79 | 8 / 50 | ▲4 | 12 / 125 | ▲5 | 21 / 248 | ▲5 | 4th | Opposition |
| 2025 | Hirofumi Yoshimura; Seiji Maehara | 3,451,834 | 5.84 | 3 / 74 | ▼2 | 4,375,927 | 7.39 | 4 / 50 | ▼1 | 7 / 125 | ▼3 | 19 / 248 | ▼2 | 5th | Opposition (until 2025) |
| 2025 | Hirofumi Yoshimura; Seiji Maehara | 3,451,834 | 5.84 | 3 / 74 | ▼2 | 4,375,927 | 7.39 | 4 / 50 | ▼1 | 7 / 125 | ▼3 | 19 / 248 | ▼2 | 5th | LDP–JIP governing coalition (since 2025) |
| 2025 | Hirofumi Yoshimura; Seiji Maehara | 3,451,834 | 5.84 | 3 / 74 | ▼2 | 4,375,927 | 7.39 | 4 / 50 | ▼1 | 7 / 125 | ▼3 | 19 / 248 | ▼2 | 5th | LDP–JIP coalition (since 2026) |
