= Ichirō Matsui =

Japanese politician

- 松井 一郎
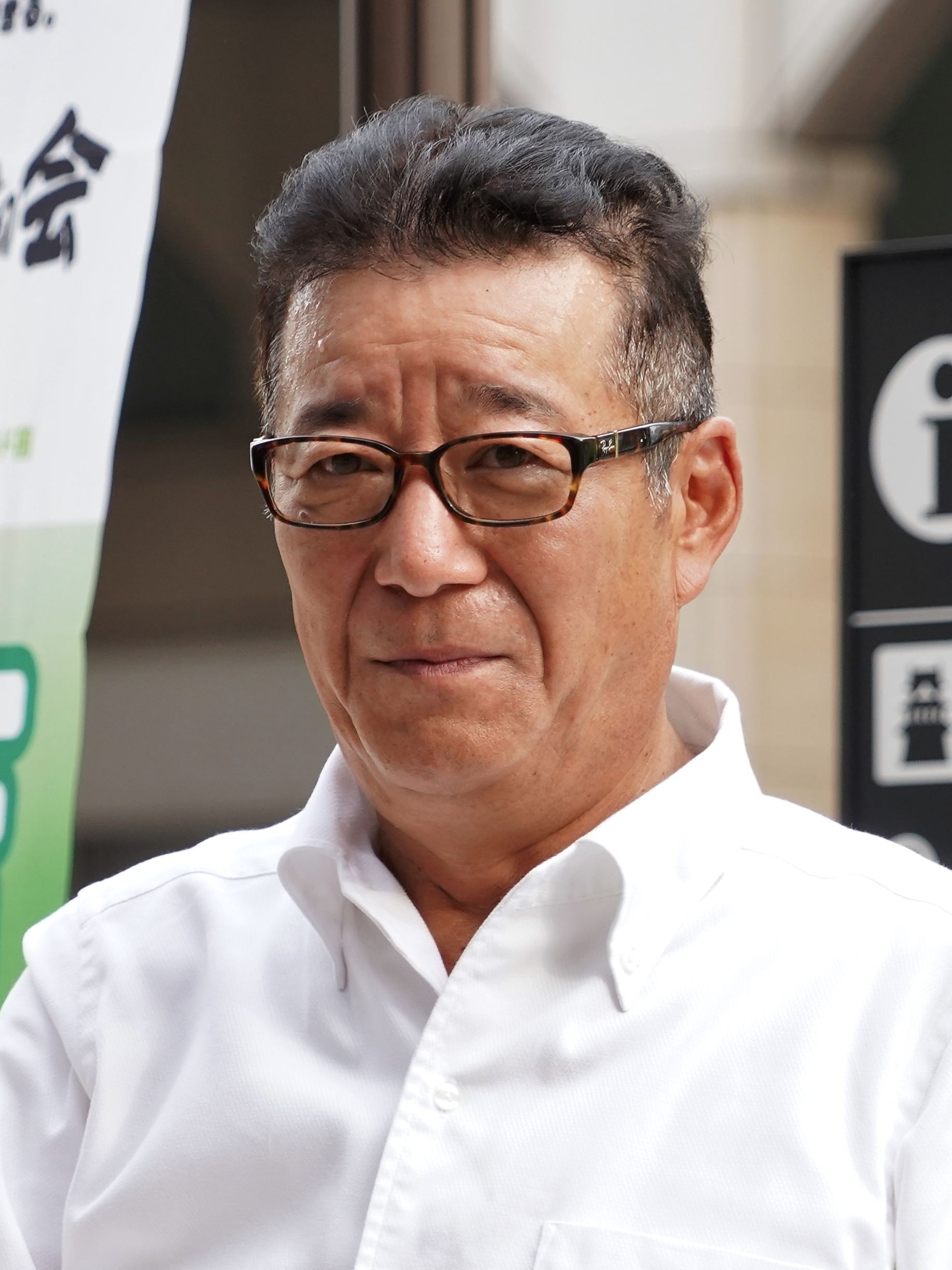
- Matsui in 2022

Mayor of Osaka
- In office 8 April 2019 – 6 April 2023
- Preceded by: Hirofumi Yoshimura
- Succeeded by: Hideyuki Yokoyama

Leader of the Nippon Ishin no Kai
- In office 12 December 2015 – 27 August 2022
- Preceded by: Tōru Hashimoto
- Succeeded by: Nobuyuki Baba

Governor of Osaka Prefecture
- In office 27 November 2011 – 21 March 2019
- Monarch: Akihito
- Preceded by: Tōru Hashimoto
- Succeeded by: Hirofumi Yoshimura

Member of the Osaka Prefectural Assembly
- In office 30 April 2003 – 10 November 2011

Personal details
- Born: 31 January 1964 (age 62) Yao, Osaka, Japan
- Party: Nippon Ishin no Kai (National); Osaka Restoration Association (Local)
- Other political affiliations: LDP (until 2010); JRP (2012–2014); JIP (2014–2015)
- Children: 2
- Parent: Yoshio Matsui (father)
- Education: Fukuoka Institute of Technology
- Website: Official website

Ichirō Matsui (松井一郎, Matsui Ichirō; born 31 January 1964) is a Japanese businessman and politician who is formerly the mayor of Osaka, leader of the Osaka Restoration Association (ORA) and Nippon Ishin no Kai alongside Nobuyuki Baba.

== Early life ==
Ichiro Matsui was born on 31 January 1964 in Yao, Osaka. His father Yoshio Matsui was a prefectural assemblyman. Matsui attended public elementary and middle schools in Yao, and moved to Fukuoka for high school. After he graduated from Fukuoka Institute of Technology in March 1986, he worked for Kinden, a construction company affiliated with the Kansai Electric Power Company, and Daitu, a privately held logistics and waste management company.

== Political career ==
Matsui entered politics in April 2003 when he was elected to the Osaka Prefectural Assembly, serving three consecutive terms. He was a member of the Liberal Democratic Party until 2010, and served in several regional party leadership positions.

=== Osaka Restoration Association and Japan Restoration Association ===
In April 2010 Matsui became the first secretary general of the regional Osaka Restoration Association. In September 2012 he also became the founding secretary-general of the new national party, the Japan Restoration Association.

=== Governor of Osaka ===
After Tōru Hashimoto decided to step down as governor of Osaka prefecture in order to run as mayor of Osaka city in an effort to advance his plans of merging the two entities, Matsui ran for the governor position to replace him. Matsui was elected to the post in the November 2011 election.

In June 2012, Kyozo Isohi, a homeless and unemployed man recently released from jail, stabbed two passersby to death in Shinsaibashi with a kitchen knife. Isohi told police that "he was frustrated at having no home and no job prospects, and that he didn't want to live anymore". Matsui made a controversial remark during a press conference, stating the attacker should have just killed himself instead of harming others.

Matsui was re-elected to a second term in the Osaka "double election" of November 2015, scoring an overwhelming victory over his challengers.

=== Mayor of Osaka ===
In the 2019 Osaka mayoral election, Matsui defeated his opponent, Akira Yanagimoto, and was elected 21st Mayor of Osaka. This is the second person who has experience as governor of Osaka Prefecture to become the mayor of Osaka, after Toru Hashimoto. In addition, it is the first time since Kunio Hiramatsu that a person who has worked in a private company has been appointed Mayor of Osaka. Matsui has announced his planned retirement from politics in April 2023.

== Personal life ==
Matsui is married and the father of one son and one daughter.

Political offices
Preceded by Tōru Hashimoto	Governor of Osaka Prefecture; November 2011 – March 2019	Succeeded by Hirofumi Yoshimura
Preceded by Hirofumi Yoshimura	Mayor of Osaka City; March 2019 - April 2023	Succeeded by Hideyuki Yokoyama
