= Hirofumi Yoshimura =

Japanese politician (born 1975)

- 吉村 洋文
- Yoshimura in 2025

Leader of Nippon Ishin no Kai
- Incumbent
- Assumed office 1 December 2024
- Co-Leader: Seiji Maehara; Fumitake Fujita
- Preceded by: Nobuyuki Baba

Governor of Osaka Prefecture
- Incumbent
- Assumed office 8 April 2019
- Monarchs: Akihito; Naruhito
- Preceded by: Ichirō Matsui

Mayor of Osaka
- In office 19 December 2015 – 21 March 2019
- Preceded by: Tōru Hashimoto
- Succeeded by: Ichirō Matsui

Member of the House of Representatives
- In office 15 December 2014 – 1 October 2015
- Preceded by: Multi-member district
- Succeeded by: Tamotsu Shiiki
- Constituency: Kinki PR

Member of the Osaka City Council
- In office April 30, 2011 – 2014
- Constituency: Kita Ward

Personal details
- Born: 17 June 1975 (age 51) Kawachinagano, Osaka, Japan
- Party: Ishin (national); Osaka Restoration Association (local)
- Education: Kyushu University
- Website: yoshimura-hirofumi.com

Hirofumi Yoshimura (吉村 洋文, Yoshimura Hirofumi; born 17 June 1975) is a Japanese politician currently serving as the Leader of Japan Innovation Party since December 2024 and the governor of Osaka Prefecture since 2019. He has been described as a conservative.

== Early life ==
Yoshimura was born in the city of Kawachinagano. He studied law at Kyushu University, graduating in 1998. He passed the Japanese bar examination later that year and was admitted to practice as an attorney in 2000, at the age of 25.

After working for several years under Tokyo-based attorney Shintaro Kumagai (熊谷 信太郎), Yoshimura returned to Osaka and co-founded the Star Law Office in 2005. He remains a partner in the firm as of 2017.

== Political career ==
=== Osaka City Council ===
Yoshimura was elected to the Osaka city council in 2011 as a member of the Osaka Restoration Association headed by Osaka Prefecture governor Toru Hashimoto.

=== House of Representatives ===
Yoshimura was elected to the Japanese House of Representatives in the 2014 general election as a member of the Japan Innovation Party. He was a candidate in the Osaka 4th district and lost in a close race with LDP incumbent Yasuhide Nakayama, but picked up a seat through the JIP proportional representation list.

Yoshimura's tenure in the Diet was short. Following an unsuccessful referendum in May 2015 to restructure the Osaka government, Toru Hashimoto announced his resignation as mayor of Osaka. In October, Hashimoto announced that he would transform the Osaka Restoration Association into a national party with about a dozen Diet members who had broken away from the JIP. On the same day, Yoshimura resigned from the House to run in the November 2015 election to replace Hashimoto. Hashimoto reportedly hand-picked Yoshimura to serve as his successor.

=== Mayor of Osaka ===
Yoshimura was initially considered an underdog in his mayoral bid in the November 2015 "double election" for the governor of Osaka Prefecture and mayor of Osaka City. However, he won the election by a wide margin with former mayor Hashimoto's support. In the final tally, he won 596,045 votes versus 406,595 for runner-up Akira Yanagimoto, who was supported by Prime Minister Shinzo Abe and the LDP. Yoshimura took office on 18 December 2015.

At the beginning of his term, Yoshimura joined with the newly elected Osaka Prefecture governor Ichiro Matsui to establish a joint office for the purpose of promoting Osaka as a "vice capital" of Japan, such as by hosting government agencies currently based in Tokyo.

Yoshimura is a proponent of casino development in Osaka, and led a 2017 proposal to re-develop part of the Yumenoshima artificial island in Osaka Bay as a casino facility.

In 2017, Yoshimura threatened to cancel Osaka's sister city relationship with San Francisco due to plans from a Chinese-American group to incorporate a statue of a comfort woman in a San Francisco municipal park. In October 2018, he officially terminated Osaka's sister city relationship with San Francisco. He resigned from the post on 21 March 2019 to contest the Osaka Gubernatorial Election.

=== Governor of Osaka ===
Yoshimura won the Osaka gubernatorial election held in 2019. He was backed by Osaka Ishin. His opponent, Tadakazu Konishi, was backed by the Liberal Democratic Party and Komeito.

=== Japan Innovation Party leader ===
After Nobuyuki Baba stepped down as leader of the Japan Innovation Party in the wake of its poor showing in the 2024 Japanese general election, Yoshimura was elected party leader on 1 December, winning 80% of votes cast. He appointed Seiji Maehara as co-leader, partially for Maehara to lead the Diet branch, as Yoshimura is based in Osaka. In 2025, he negotiated a coalition agreement to provide confidence and supply to the ruling Liberal Democratic Party.

Preceded by Ichirō Matsui	Governor of Osaka Prefecture; April 2019 – present	Succeeded by Incumbent
