= Osaka Prefectural Assembly =

Parliament of Osaka, Japan

Osaka Prefectural Assembly 大阪府議会 Ōsaka-fugikai

Type
- Type: Unicameral

History
- Founded: 1878 (edict on prefectural assemblies); 1947 (current local autonomy law)

Structure
- Seats: 88
- Political groups: Government (51): One Osaka (51); Opposition (27): Kōmeitō (14); LDP (7); CDP (2); JCP (1); Osaka Naniwa no Wa (1); Independent (2); Vacant (1): Vacant (1)

Elections
- Voting system: Single non-transferable vote
- Last election: 2023

Meeting place
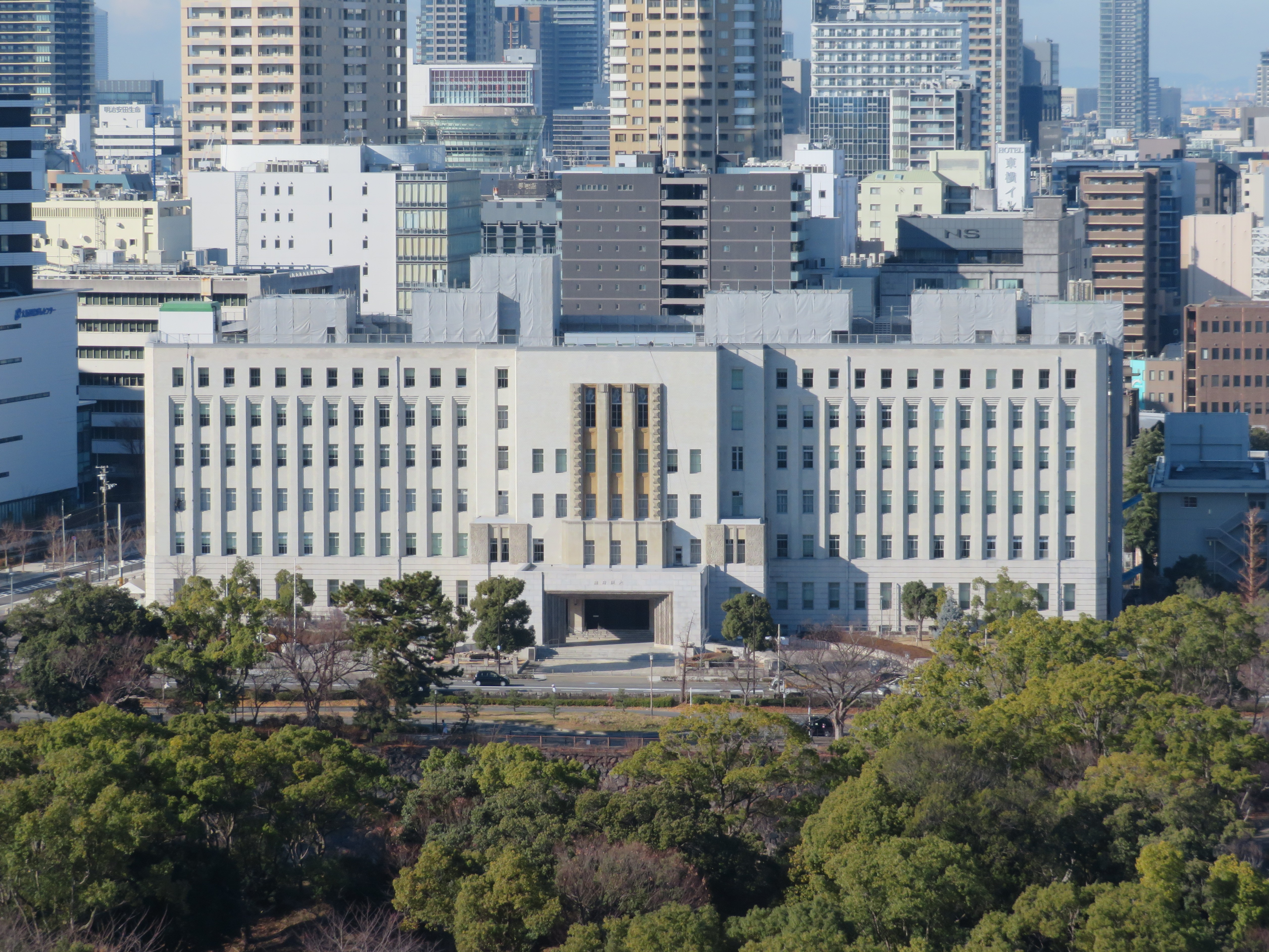

Website
- www.pref.osaka.jp/gikai_giji/toppage/index.html

The Osaka Prefectural Assembly (大阪府議会, Ōsaka-fu gikai) is the legislature of Osaka Prefecture. As in all prefectures, it is elected to four-year terms by single non-transferable vote in multi- and single-member districts and is responsible for enacting and amending prefectural by-laws, approving the budget and important administrative appointments in the prefectural government, including the prefecture's vice governors. The assembly has a regular membership 88 members.

== Current composition ==
2019 election result by nominating parties: Ishin 51, LDP 15, Komeito 15, JCP 2, CDP 1, Independents 4

The 2019 assembly election took place on 7 April 2019 as part of the 19th unified local elections. The Osaka Restoration Association, retained its position as the largest party in the assembly, reclaimed an outright majority, as it had after the April 2011 election.

As of 30 April 2019, the assembly was composed as follows:

Composition of the Osaka assembly after the 2019 general election
Parliamentary group	Seats	Change from before election
Osaka Restoration Association (大阪維新の会, Ōsaka Ishin no Kai)	51	+11
Liberal Democratic Party – Independents (自由民主党・無所属, Jiyūminshutō・mushozoku)	16	-8
Komeito (公明党, Kōmeitō)	15	0
Japanese Communist Party (日本共産党, Nihon Kyōsantō)	2	0
Democratic Net (民主ネット, Minshu Net) [includes CDP]	2	+1
Kaikaku hoshu	1	0
Creati[on/ve] Conservativ[e/ism] (創生保守, Sōsei hoshu)	1	0
Total	88	+4 (vacant seats)

== Electoral districts ==
Changes to the electoral districts at the April 2015 election, there are 88 assembly members who are elected in 53 electoral districts, reduced from the 109 members who were elected at the 2011 election. Most districts cover one municipality or one ward of a designated major city (Osaka and Sakai), but some cover several wards or municipalities. The nine towns and one village within the prefecture are referred to by the district that they belong to.

Electoral districts of the Osaka Prefectural Assembly
District	Magnitude	District	Magnitude
within Osaka City		Kishiwada City	2
Kita-ku	1	Toyonaka City	4
Miyakojima-ku	1	Ikeda City	1
Fukushima-ku and Konohana-ku	1	Suita City	4
Chūō-ku	1	Izumiōtsu City, Takaishi City and Senboku District (Tadaoka Town)	1
Nishi-ku	1	Takatsuki City and Mishima District (Shimamoto Town)	4
Minato-ku	1	Kaizuka City	1
Taishō-ku and Nishinari-ku	2	Moriguchi City	1
Tennōji-ku and Naniwa-ku	1	Hirakata-shi	4
Nishiyodogawa-ku	1	Ibaraki City	3
Yodogawa-ku	2	Yao City	3
Higashiyodogawa-ku	2	Izumisano City and Kumatori Town (of Sennan District)	1
Higashinari-ku	1	Tondabayashi City, Ōsakasayama City and Minamikawachi District	2
Ikuno-ku	1	Neyagawa City	2
Asahi-ku	1	Kawachinagano City	1
Jōtō-ku	2	Matsubara City	1
Tsurumi-ku	1	Daitō City and Shijōnawate City	2
Abeno-ku	1	Izumi City	2
Suminoe-ku	1	Minoh City and Toyono District	2
Sumiyoshi-ku	2	Kashiwara City and Fujiidera City	1
Higashi-Sumiyoshi-ku	1	Habikino City	1
Hirano-ku	2	Kadoma City	1
Sakai City		Settsu City	1
Sakai-ku	1	Higashiōsaka-shi	5
Naka-ku	1	Sennan City, Hannan City, Tajiri Town and Misaki Town (of Sennan District)	1
Higashi-ku and Mihara-ku	1	Katano City	1
Nishi-ku	1		
Minami-ku	2		
Kita-ku	2		
