= Politics of Osaka Prefecture =

Politics of a prefecture of Japan

Politics of Osaka, as in all 47 prefectures of Japan, takes place in the framework of local autonomy that is guaranteed by chapter 8 of the Constitution and laid out in the Local Autonomy Law. The administration is headed by a governor directly elected by the people every four years in first-past-the-post elections. Legislation, the budget and the approval of personnel appointments, including the vice governors, are handled by the prefectural assembly that is directly elected by the people every four years by single-non transferable vote.

Political debate in Osaka has in recent years been dominated by the Osaka Metropolis plan, a plan to transform Osaka – similarly to Tokyo – into a to, a metropolitan prefecture in which Osaka city, Sakai city and possibly other municipalities of Ōsaka are dissolved and subdivided into special wards like those of Tokyo city. The main proponent of the plan is the Osaka Restoration Association (Ōsaka Ishin no Kai, lit. "Osaka renewal assembly") of former governor and current Osaka city mayor Tōru Hashimoto; by 2012, the party controls the governorship, a majority in the Osaka assembly, and several municipal institutions including the Osaka city mayor and Osaka city assembly.

Osaka is one of the most urbanized and economically developed prefectures; with a fiscal strength index of around 0.8 its fiscal strength is well above the national average; but unlike Tokyo and Aichi which have fiscal strength indices above 1, Osaka is not able to fully cover its budget with prefectural revenues.

== National representation ==
Osaka's directly elected delegation to the National Diet currently consists of 19 members of the Lower house of Japan (House of Representatives) and currently seven members (eight after 2016 when a reapportionment from three to four seats per election becomes effective in both halves of the chamber) of the Japanese Senate (House of Councillors). Additionally, the prefecture is part of the Kinki proportional representation block for the House of Representatives and the nationwide proportional election to the House of Councillors.

In the 2005 Representatives election, the centre-right Liberal Democratic–Kōmeitō coalition had won 17 of Osaka's districts, Democrats only held onto the 11th and 19th districts. In the 2009 election, the landslide was reversed with the centre-left Democratic-Social Democratic opposition winning 18 districts of Osaka and the Liberal Democrats only successfully defending the 13th district. In the 2012 Representatives election, the Japan Restoration Party (JRP) and New Komeito (NK) which had a regional cooperation agreement with the JRP in Kinki won a landslide victory, Liberal Democrats (L) won three seats, Democrats (D) none.

The directly elected Representatives and Councillors from Osaka are currently (as of December 16, 2012):

- Representatives
  - 1st district: Hidetaka Inoue (JRP)
  - 2nd district: Akira Satō (L)
  - 3rd district: Shigeki Satō (NK)
  - 4th district: Masatoshi Murakami (JRP)
  - 5th district: Tōru Kunishige (NK)
  - 6th district: Shin'ichi Isa (NK)
  - 7th district: Naomi Tokashiki (L)
  - 8th district: Tomohiko Kinoshita (JRP)
  - 9th district: Yasushi Odachi (JRP)
  - 10th district: Kenta Matsunami (JRP)
  - 11th district: Nobuhisa Itō (JRP)
  - 12th district: Tomokatsu Kitagawa (L)
  - 13th district: Kōichi Nishino (JRP)
  - 14th district: Takashi Tanihata (JRP)
  - 15th district: Yasuto Urano (JRP)
  - 16th district: Kazuo Kitagawa (NK)
  - 17th district: Nobuyuki Baba (JRP)
  - 18th district: Takashi Endō (JRP)
  - 19th district: Hodaka Maruyama (JRP)
- Councillors (Osaka At-large district)
  - Class of 2010 (term ends 2016)
    - Hirotaka Ishikawa (NK)
    - Issei Kitagawa (L)
    - Motoyuki Odachi (D)
  - Class of 2013 (term ends 2019)
    - Tōru Azuma (JRP)
    - Takuji Yanagimoto (L)
    - Hisatake Sugi (NK)
    - Kōtarō Tatsumi (JCP)

== Governor ==
Osaka's current governor is Osaka Restoration Association secretary-general Ichirō Matsui who defeated Kaoru Kurata (supported by Democrats and Liberal Democrats), a Communist and four other candidates in the November 2011 early election triggered by Tōru Hashimoto's resignation. Previous elected governors of Osaka were:

1. Bunzō Akama (JLP/LP/JDP), 3 terms, 1947–1959,
2. Gisen Satō (L), 3 terms, 1959–1971,
3. Ryōichi Kuroda (I – S, JCP; only JCP support in his second election), 2 terms, 1971–1979,
4. Sakae Kishi (I), 3 terms, 1979–1991,
5. Kazuo Nakagawa (I), 1 term, 1991–1995,
6. Knock Yokoyama (I), 2 terms, 1995–1999 (resigned),
7. Fusae Ōta (I – L, D, Kōmeitō, LP; additionally SDP support in her second election), 2 terms, 2000–2008,
8. Tōru Hashimoto (I – L, Kōmeitō; formed Restoration Association in 2010), 1 term, 2008–2011 (resigned).

== Assembly ==
The Prefectural Assembly has currently 109 members, elected to four-year terms by single non-transferable vote in 62 multi- and single-member districts which correspond to the wards of designated cities, independent cities and counties of Osaka. Regular elections have been held as part of the unified regional elections (last round: April 2011) in postwar Japan; by-elections are scheduled as necessary. In the 2011 election the Osaka Restoration Association won an outright majority.

== Regional cooperation ==
Osaka joined in the Kansai regional cooperation (Kansai kōiki rengō, "Union of Kansai Governments") together with Shiga, Kyōto, Hyōgo, Wakayama, Tottori and Tokushima in December 2010. For the time being, the cooperation is limited to few areas of administration such as tourism promotion or disaster prevention; but an expansion of responsibilities both from the prefectural level and the central government is planned. The regional cooperation is considered a one potential step towards the possible implementation of a system of larger states (dō-shū-sei) as a replacement for the current prefectures as proposed by some local and national politicians and loosely planned by the central government since the early 2000s.
