= List of current senators of Japan =

The Senate (formerly known as the House of Councillors) is the upper house of the National Diet of Japan. The Senate consists of 248 seats, 148 in constituencies and 100 in the national proportional representation block.

== Term of Office ==
The term of office of members of the Japanese Senate is six years, but half of them are elected every three years, so even if the Senate election is held on the same day as the House of Representatives general election, half of them exist in the Senate.

Current term
	Term start	Term end	Note
Class of 2022	July 26, 2022	July 25, 2028	Members were elected in the 2022 Japanese House of Councillors election.
Class of 2025	July 29, 2025	July 28, 2031	Members were elected in the 2025 Japanese House of Councillors election.

== Parliamentary groups ==
As of February 15, 2026, after the 220th National Diet session.

Office	Member	Party	Born	Constituency
President	Masakazu Sekiguchi	LDP	June 4, 1953 (age 73)	Saitama
Vice President	Tetsuro Fukuyama	CDP	January 19, 1962 (age 64)	Kyoto

Party		Seats			
Party		Class of 2022	Class of 2025	Total	Group
Government		73	47	120	
LDP and Independent	LDP	61	39	100	101
LDP and Independent	Independent	0	1	1	101
Ishin	Ishin	12	7	19	19
Opposition		46	75	121	
CDP and Independents	CDP	17	21	38	40
CDP and Independents	Independent	0	2	2	40
DPFP	DPFP	7	18	25	25
Komeito	Komeito	13	8	21	21
Sanseitō	Sanseitō	1	14	15	15
JCP	JCP	4	3	7	7
Reiwa	Reiwa	2	3	5	5
CPJ	CPJ	0	2	2	2
Okinawa Whirlwind	Independent	1	1	2	2
Team Mirai and the Independent	Team Mirai	0	1	1	2
Team Mirai and the Independent	Independent	0	1	1	2
SDP	SDP	1	1	2	2
Unaffiliated		4	2	6	
Not in parliamentary groups	President (LDP)	1	0	1	6
Not in parliamentary groups	Vice President (CDP)	1	0	1	6
Not in parliamentary groups	Independent	2	2	4	6
Vacant		1	0	1	
Tokyo (2022 class, seat previously held by Reiwa Shinsengumi)		1	0	1	1
Total		124	124	248	

== Vacancies ==
- Tokyo: Taro Yamamoto (Reiwa)
  - Seat has been vacant since Yamamoto's resignation on January 21, 2026 due to poor health. No by-election has been held per the Public Offices Election Act; the threshold of one-quarter of district seats has not been met.

== Members in Constituencies ==
=== Members in six-member constituencies ===
- LDP (3)
- DPP (2)
- Komeito (2)
- JCP (2)
- CDP (1)
- Sanseitō (1)
- Vacant (1)

Constituency	Class	Place	Member	Party	Born	Note
Tokyo	Class of 2022	#1	Kentaro Asahi	LDP	September 19, 1975 (age 51)	
Tokyo	Class of 2022	#2	Toshiko Takeya	Komeito	September 30, 1969 (age 57)	
Tokyo	Class of 2022	#3	Taku Yamazoe	JCP	November 20, 1984 (age 41)	
Tokyo	Class of 2022	#4	Akiko Ikuina	LDP	April 28, 1968 (age 58)	
Tokyo	Class of 2022	#5	Vacant			
Tokyo	Class of 2022	#6	Ayaka Shiomura	CDP	July 6, 1978 (age 48)	
Tokyo	Class of 2025	#1	Daichi Suzuki	LDP	March 10, 1967 (age 59)	
Tokyo	Class of 2025	#2	Saya	Sanseitō	July 7, 1982 (age 44)	
Tokyo	Class of 2025	#3	Mayu Ushida	DPP	June 8, 1985 (age 41)	
Tokyo	Class of 2025	#4	Yudai Kawamura	Komeito	June 29, 1984 (age 42)	
Tokyo	Class of 2025	#5	Yoshihiro Okumura	DPP	February 9, 1994 (age 32)	
Tokyo	Class of 2025	#6	Yoshiko Kira	JCP	September 14, 1982 (age 44)	

=== Members in four-member constituencies ===
- LDP (8)
- CDP (6)
- Komeito (5)
- DPP (5)
- Ishin (4)
- Sanseitō (4)

Constituency	Class	Place	Member	Party	Born	Note
Aichi	Class of 2022	#1	Masahito Fujikawa	LDP	July 8, 1960 (age 66)	
Aichi	Class of 2022	#2	Ryūji Satomi	Komeito	October 17, 1967 (age 59)	
Aichi	Class of 2022	#3	Yoshitaka Saitō	CDP	February 18, 1963 (age 63)	
Aichi	Class of 2022	#4	Takae Itō	DPP	June 30, 1975 (age 51)	
Aichi	Class of 2025	#1	Koichi Mizuno	DPP	October 27, 1976 (age 50)	
Aichi	Class of 2025	#2	Maiko Tajima	CDP	December 20, 1976 (age 49)	
Aichi	Class of 2025	#3	Junko Sugimoto	Sanseitō	July 23, 1977 (age 49)	
Aichi	Class of 2025	#4	Yasuyuki Sakai	LDP	February 14, 1952 (age 74)	
Kanagawa	Class of 2022	#1	Junko Mihara	LDP	September 13, 1964 (age 62)	
Kanagawa	Class of 2022	#2	Shigefumi Matsuzawa	Ishin	April 2, 1958 (age 68)	
Kanagawa	Class of 2022	#3	Nobuhiro Miura	Komeito	March 5, 1975 (age 51)	
Kanagawa	Class of 2022	#4	Keiichiro Asao	LDP	February 11, 1964 (age 62)	
Kanagawa	Class of 2025	#1	Hiroe Makiyama	CDP	September 29, 1964 (age 62)	
Kanagawa	Class of 2025	#2	Akihiro Kagoshima	DPP	December 8, 1988 (age 37)	
Kanagawa	Class of 2025	#3	Masaaki Waki	LDP	April 24, 1982 (age 44)	
Kanagawa	Class of 2025	#4	Hiroki Hazikano	Sanseitō	July 6, 1977 (age 49)	
Osaka	Class of 2022	#1	Kaori Takagi	Ishin	October 10, 1972 (age 54)	
Osaka	Class of 2022	#2	Rui Matsukawa	LDP	February 26, 1971 (age 55)	
Osaka	Class of 2022	#3	Hitoshi Asada	Ishin	December 29, 1950 (age 75)	
Osaka	Class of 2022	#4	Hirotaka Ishikawa	Komeito	September 12, 1973 (age 53)	
Osaka	Class of 2025	#1	Rie Sasaki	Ishin	August 24, 1982 (age 44)	
Osaka	Class of 2025	#2	Futoshi Okazaki	Ishin	November 18, 1967 (age 58)	
Osaka	Class of 2025	#3	Chisato Miyade	Sanseitō	March 15, 1985 (age 41)	
Osaka	Class of 2025	#4	Hisatake Sugi	Komeito	January 4, 1976 (age 50)	
Saitama	Class of 2022	#1	Masakazu Sekiguchi	LDP	June 4, 1953 (age 73)	
Saitama	Class of 2022	#2	Kiyoshi Ueda	DPP	May 15, 1948 (age 78)	Elected as an independent; became a DPP member in September 2025.
Saitama	Class of 2022	#3	Makoto Nishida	Komeito	August 27, 1962 (age 64)	
Saitama	Class of 2022	#4	Mari Takagi	CDP	August 12, 1967 (age 59)	
Saitama	Class of 2025	#1	Toshiharu Furukawa	LDP	January 14, 1963 (age 63)	
Saitama	Class of 2025	#2	Kumiko Ehara	DPP	November 15, 1970 (age 55)	
Saitama	Class of 2025	#3	Hiroto Kumagai	CDP	March 23, 1962 (age 64)	
Saitama	Class of 2025	#4	Tsutomu Ōtsu	Sanseitō	September 8, 1971 (age 55)	

=== Members in three-member constituencies ===
- LDP (11)
- CDP (5)
- Komeito (4)
- DPP (1)
- Ishin (1)
- Sanseitō (1)
- Independent (1)

Constituency	Class	Place	Member	Party	Born	Note
Chiba	Class of 2022	#1	Shoichi Usui	LDP	January 8, 1975 (age 51)	
Chiba	Class of 2022	#2	Kuniko Inoguchi	LDP	May 3, 1952 (age 74)	
Chiba	Class of 2022	#3	Hiroyuki Konishi	CDP	January 28, 1972 (age 54)	
Chiba	Class of 2025	#1	Sayaka Kobayashi	DPP	September 5, 1983 (age 43)	
Chiba	Class of 2025	#2	Hiroyuki Nagahama	CDP	October 20, 1958 (age 68)	
Chiba	Class of 2025	#3	Junichi Ishii	LDP	November 23, 1957 (age 68)	
Fukuoka	Class of 2022	#1	Satoshi Ōie	LDP	July 17, 1967 (age 59)	
Fukuoka	Class of 2022	#2	Yukihito Koga	CDP	April 9, 1959 (age 67)	
Fukuoka	Class of 2022	#3	Kōzō Akino	Komeito	July 11, 1967 (age 59)	
Fukuoka	Class of 2025	#1	Masaji Matsuyama	LDP	January 20, 1959 (age 67)	
Fukuoka	Class of 2025	#2	Yūko Nakada	Sanseitō	December 12, 1989 (age 36)	
Fukuoka	Class of 2025	#3	Rokuta Shimono	Komeito	May 1, 1964 (age 62)	
Hokkaido	Class of 2022	#1	Gaku Hasegawa	LDP	February 16, 1971 (age 55)	
Hokkaido	Class of 2022	#2	Eri Tokunaga	CDP	January 1, 1962 (age 64)	
Hokkaido	Class of 2022	#3	Toshimitsu Funahashi	LDP	November 20, 1960 (age 65)	
Hokkaido	Class of 2025	#1	Harumi Takahashi	LDP	January 6, 1954 (age 72)	
Hokkaido	Class of 2025	#2	Kenji Katsube	CDP	September 6, 1959 (age 67)	
Hokkaido	Class of 2025	#3	Tsuyohito Iwamoto	LDP	October 19, 1964 (age 62)	
Hyōgo	Class of 2022	#1	Daisuke Katayama	Ishin	October 6, 1966 (age 60)	
Hyōgo	Class of 2022	#2	Shinsuke Suematsu	LDP	December 17, 1955 (age 70)	
Hyōgo	Class of 2022	#3	Takae Itō	Komeito	January 13, 1968 (age 58)	
Hyōgo	Class of 2025	#1	Fusaho Izumi	Independent	August 19, 1963 (age 63)	
Hyōgo	Class of 2025	#2	Mitsuo Takahashi	Komeito	February 15, 1977 (age 49)	
Hyōgo	Class of 2025	#3	Hiroyuki Kada	LDP	June 8, 1970 (age 56)	

=== Members in two-member constituencies ===
- LDP (8)
- CDP (3)
- DPP (2)
- Ishin (1)
- Sanseitō (1)
- Independent (1)

Constituency	Class	Place	Member	Party	Born	Note
Hiroshima	Class of 2022	#1	Yoichi Miyazawa	LDP	April 21, 1950 (age 76)	
Hiroshima	Class of 2022	#2	Eri Mikami	CDP	June 11, 1970 (age 56)	
Hiroshima	Class of 2025	#1	Hidenori Nishita	LDP	August 3, 1981 (age 45)	
Hiroshima	Class of 2025	#2	Shinji Morimoto	CDP	May 2, 1973 (age 53)	
Ibaraki	Class of 2022	#1	Akiyoshi Kato	LDP	February 7, 1968 (age 58)	
Ibaraki	Class of 2022	#2	Makiko Dōgomi	DPP	September 15, 1975 (age 51)	Elected as an independent; became a DPP member in December 2025.
Ibaraki	Class of 2025	#1	Ryōsuke Kōzuki	LDP	December 26, 1962 (age 63)	
Ibaraki	Class of 2025	#2	Shoko Sakurai	Sanseitō	January 31, 1984 (age 42)	
Kyoto	Class of 2022	#1	Akira Yoshii	LDP	January 2, 1967 (age 59)	
Kyoto	Class of 2022	#2	Tetsuro Fukuyama	CDP	January 19, 1962 (age 64)	
Kyoto	Class of 2025	#1	Shohei Niimi	Ishin	April 10, 1989 (age 37)	
Kyoto	Class of 2025	#2	Shoji Nishida	LDP	September 19, 1958 (age 68)	
Shizuoka	Class of 2022	#1	Yohei Wakabayashi	LDP	December 24, 1971 (age 54)	
Shizuoka	Class of 2022	#2	Sachiko Hirayama	Independent	January 3, 1971 (age 55)	
Shizuoka	Class of 2025	#1	Kazuya Shimba	DPP	April 25, 1967 (age 59)	
Shizuoka	Class of 2025	#2	Takao Makino	LDP	January 1, 1959 (age 67)	

=== Members in single-member constituencies ===
- LDP (41)
- CDP (11)
- Independent (8)
- DPP (4)

Constituency	Class	Member	Party	Born	Note
Akita	Class of 2022	Hiroo Ishii	LDP	June 21, 1964 (age 62)	
Akita	Class of 2025	Shizuka Terata	Independent	March 23, 1975 (age 51)	
Aomori	Class of 2022	Masayo Tanabu	CDP	July 10, 1969 (age 57)	
Aomori	Class of 2025	Masumi Fukushi	CDP	March 24, 1965 (age 61)	
Ehime	Class of 2022	Junzo Yamamoto	LDP	October 27, 1954 (age 72)	
Ehime	Class of 2025	Takako Nagae	Independent	June 15, 1960 (age 66)	
Fukui	Class of 2022	Masaaki Yamazaki	LDP	May 24, 1942 (age 84)	
Fukui	Class of 2025	Hirofumi Takinami	LDP	October 20, 1971 (age 55)	
Fukushima	Class of 2022	Hokuto Hoshi	LDP	March 18, 1964 (age 62)	
Fukushima	Class of 2025	Masako Mori	LDP	August 22, 1964 (age 62)	
Gifu	Class of 2022	Takeyuki Watanabe	LDP	April 18, 1968 (age 58)	
Gifu	Class of 2025	Atsuko Wakai	LDP	September 12, 1971 (age 55)	
Gunma	Class of 2022	Hirofumi Nakasone	LDP	November 28, 1945 (age 80)	
Gunma	Class of 2025	Masato Shimizu	LDP	February 26, 1975 (age 51)	
Ishikawa	Class of 2022	Naoki Okada	LDP	June 9, 1962 (age 64)	
Ishikawa	Class of 2025	Shuji Miyamoto	LDP	March 27, 1971 (age 55)	
Iwate	Class of 2022	Eiji Kidoguchi	CDP	August 21, 1963 (age 63)	
Iwate	Class of 2025	Takanori Yokosawa	CDP	March 6, 1972 (age 54)	
Kagawa	Class of 2022	Yoshihiko Isozaki	LDP	September 8, 1957 (age 69)	
Kagawa	Class of 2025	Hidekazu Harada	DPP	December 25, 1972 (age 53)	
Kagoshima	Class of 2022	Tetsuro Nomura	LDP	November 20, 1943 (age 82)	
Kagoshima	Class of 2025	Tomomi Otsuji	Independent	January 17, 1981 (age 45)	
Kumamoto	Class of 2022	Yoshifumi Matsumura	LDP	April 22, 1964 (age 62)	
Kumamoto	Class of 2025	Seishi Baba	LDP	November 30, 1964 (age 61)	
Mie	Class of 2022	Sachiko Yamamoto	LDP	October 24, 1967 (age 59)	
Mie	Class of 2025	Tomoko Kojima	CDP	January 17, 1961 (age 65)	
Miyagi	Class of 2022	Mitsuru Sakurai	LDP	May 12, 1956 (age 70)	
Miyagi	Class of 2025	Noriko Ishigaki	CDP	August 1, 1974 (age 52)	
Miyazaki	Class of 2022	Shinpei Matsushita	LDP	August 18, 1966 (age 60)	
Miyazaki	Class of 2025	Kanako Yamauchi	CDP	January 8, 1981 (age 45)	
Nagano	Class of 2022	Hideya Sugio	CDP	September 30, 1957 (age 69)	
Nagano	Class of 2025	Jiro Hata	CDP	September 7, 1969 (age 57)	
Nagasaki	Class of 2022	Keisuke Yamamoto	LDP	June 21, 1975 (age 51)	
Nagasaki	Class of 2025	Yuichiro Koga	LDP	November 2, 1967 (age 59)	
Nara	Class of 2022	Kei Satō	LDP	April 7, 1979 (age 47)	
Nara	Class of 2025	Iwao Horii	LDP	October 22, 1965 (age 61)	
Niigata	Class of 2022	Kazuhiro Kobayashi	LDP	June 12, 1973 (age 53)	
Niigata	Class of 2025	Sakura Uchikoshi	CDP	January 6, 1968 (age 58)	
Ōita	Class of 2022	Harutomo Kosho	LDP	December 23, 1957 (age 68)	
Ōita	Class of 2025	Tadatomo Yoshida	CDP	March 7, 1956 (age 70)	
Okayama	Class of 2022	Kimi Onoda	LDP	December 7, 1982 (age 43)	
Okayama	Class of 2025	Koichiro Kobayashi	LDP	August 8, 1977 (age 49)	
Okinawa	Class of 2022	Yōichi Iha	Independent	January 4, 1952 (age 74)	
Okinawa	Class of 2025	Sachika Takara	Independent	January 16, 1979 (age 47)	
Saga	Class of 2022	Takamaro Fukuoka	LDP	May 9, 1973 (age 53)	
Saga	Class of 2025	Yūhei Yamashita	LDP	August 27, 1979 (age 47)	
Shiga	Class of 2022	Takashi Koyari	LDP	September 9, 1966 (age 60)	
Shiga	Class of 2025	Kazuhiro Miyamoto	LDP	March 7, 1972 (age 54)	
Tochigi	Class of 2022	Michiko Ueno	LDP	April 21, 1958 (age 68)	
Tochigi	Class of 2025	Katsunori Takahashi	LDP	December 7, 1957 (age 68)	
Tokushima-Kōchi	Class of 2022	Yūsuke Nakanishi	LDP	July 12, 1979 (age 47)	
Tokushima-Kōchi	Class of 2025	Hajime Hirota	Independent	October 10, 1968 (age 58)	
Tottori-Shimane	Class of 2022	Kazuhiko Aoki	LDP	March 25, 1961 (age 65)	
Tottori-Shimane	Class of 2025	Momoko Degawa	LDP	January 7, 1978 (age 48)	
Toyama	Class of 2022	Kōtarō Nogami	LDP	May 20, 1967 (age 59)	
Toyama	Class of 2025	Yukie Niwata	DPP	December 29, 1967 (age 58)	
Wakayama	Class of 2022	Yōsuke Tsuruho	LDP	February 5, 1967 (age 59)	
Wakayama	Class of 2025	Yoshio Mochizuki	Independent	April 19, 1972 (age 54)	
Yamagata	Class of 2022	Yasue Funayama	DPP	May 26, 1966 (age 60)	
Yamagata	Class of 2025	Michiya Haga	DPP	March 2, 1958 (age 68)	Elected as an independent; became a DPP member in December 2025.
Yamaguchi	Class of 2022	Kiyoshi Ejima	LDP	April 2, 1957 (age 69)	
Yamaguchi	Class of 2025	Tsuneo Kitamura	LDP	January 5, 1955 (age 71)	
Yamanashi	Class of 2022	Manabu Nagai	LDP	May 7, 1974 (age 52)	
Yamanashi	Class of 2025	Hitoshi Goto	DPP	July 22, 1957 (age 69)	

== Members in National Proportional Representation block ==
=== Class of 2022 ===
- LDP (18)
- Ishin (8)
- CDP (7)
- Komeito (6)
- JCP (3)
- DPP (3)
- Reiwa (2)
- Sanseitō (1)
- SDP (1)
- Independent (1)

Party	Place	Member	Born	Note
LDP	#1	Kazuhiro Fujii	December 23, 1977 (age 48)	
LDP	#2	Daisuke Kajihara	October 29, 1973 (age 53)	
LDP	#3	Ken Akamatsu	July 5, 1968 (age 58)	
LDP	#4	Hideharu Hasegawa	May 7, 1959 (age 67)	
LDP	#5	Yoshio Kimura	April 17, 1948 (age 78)	Kimura ran in the national PR block in the 2022 House of Councillors election, but was defeated. In February 2026, he entered the House of Councillors as the next candidate on the LDP list, after Shigeharu Aoyama resigned to contest the 2026 general election.
LDP	#6	Satsuki Katayama	May 9, 1959 (age 67)	
LDP	#8	Hanako Jimi	February 15, 1976 (age 50)	
LDP	#9	Shinya Fujiki	February 25, 1967 (age 59)	
LDP	#10	Hiroshi Yamada	January 8, 1958 (age 68)	
LDP	#11	Rio Tomonō	November 18, 1980 (age 45)	
LDP	#12	Eriko Yamatani	September 19, 1950 (age 76)	
LDP	#13	Yoshiyuki Inoue	March 12, 1963 (age 63)	
LDP	#14	Kanehiko Shindo	July 7, 1963 (age 63)	
LDP	#15	Eriko Imai	September 22, 1983 (age 43)	
LDP	#16	Masashi Adachi	September 27, 1959 (age 67)	
LDP	#17	Masayuki Kamiya	January 6, 1979 (age 47)	
LDP	#18	Toshiyuki Ochi	March 9, 1978 (age 48)	
LDP	#19	Katsumi Ogawa	August 31, 1951 (age 75)	
Ishin	#1	Hotaru Ueno	July 7, 1984 (age 42)	Ueno was appointed to replace Akira Ishii after his resignation in September 2025.
Ishin	#2	Mitsuko Ishii	February 25, 1954 (age 72)	
Ishin	#3	Akemi Matsuno	April 27, 1968 (age 58)	
Ishin	#4	Kiyoshi Nakajo	March 4, 1946 (age 80)	
Ishin	#5	Naoki Inose	November 20, 1946 (age 79)	
Ishin	#6	Michihito Kaneko	February 20, 1970 (age 56)	
Ishin	#7	Seiichi Kushida	June 20, 1958 (age 68)	
Ishin	#8	Kenta Aoshima	April 7, 1958 (age 68)	
CDP	#1	Kiyomi Tsujimoto	April 28, 1960 (age 66)	
CDP	#2	Makoto Oniki	December 7, 1963 (age 62)	
CDP	#3	Makoto Kage	November 25, 1966 (age 59)	
CDP	#4	Shinichi Shiba	September 14, 1964 (age 62)	
CDP	#5	Kyoko Murata	May 16, 1983 (age 43)	
CDP	#6	Ai Aoki	August 18, 1965 (age 61)	
CDP	#7	Michihiro Ishibashi	July 1, 1965 (age 61)	
Komeito	#1	Shinji Takeuchi	March 19, 1964 (age 62)	
Komeito	#2	Shinichi Yokoyama	July 21, 1959 (age 67)	
Komeito	#3	Masaaki Taniai	April 27, 1973 (age 53)	
Komeito	#4	Tetsuya Kubota	November 2, 1965 (age 61)	
Komeito	#6	Isamu Ueda	August 5, 1958 (age 68)	
Komeito	#7	Masaru Miyazaki	March 18, 1958 (age 68)	
JCP	#2	Sohei Nihi	October 16, 1963 (age 63)	
JCP	#3	Tomo Iwabuchi	October 3, 1976 (age 50)	
JCP	#4	Mikishi Daimon	January 10, 1956 (age 70)	
DPP	#1	Hitoshi Takezume	February 6, 1969 (age 57)	
DPP	#2	Makoto Hamaguchi	May 18, 1965 (age 61)	
DPP	#3	Takanori Kawai	January 29, 1964 (age 62)	
Reiwa	#1	Daisuke Tenbata	December 29, 1981 (age 44)	
Reiwa	#3	Kusuo Oshima	June 11, 1961 (age 65)	
Sanseitō	#1	Sohei Kamiya	October 12, 1977 (age 49)	
SDP	#1	Mizuho Fukushima	December 24, 1955 (age 70)	
Independent	ー	Kenichiro Saito	December 25, 1980 (age 45)	

=== Class of 2025 ===
- LDP (12)
- DPP (7)
- Sanseitō (7)
- CDP (7)
- Komeito (4)
- Ishin (4)
- Reiwa (3)
- CPJ (2)
- JCP (2)
- Team Mirai (1)
- SDP (1)

Party	Place	Member	Born	Note
LDP	#1	Shōji Maitachi	August 13, 1975 (age 51)	
LDP	#2	Mamoru Fukuyama	December 19, 1952 (age 73)	
LDP	#3	Shūsaku Indō	November 10, 1967 (age 59)	
LDP	#4	Taro Yamada	May 12, 1967 (age 59)	
LDP	#5	Shigenori Kenzaka	July 18, 1968 (age 58)	
LDP	#6	Hideki Azumano	November 25, 1971 (age 54)	
LDP	#7	Seiko Hashimoto	October 5, 1964 (age 62)	
LDP	#8	Satoshi Kamayachi	July 5, 1953 (age 73)	
LDP	#9	Haruko Arimura	September 21, 1970 (age 56)	
LDP	#10	Masahiro Ishida	May 20, 1967 (age 59)	
LDP	#11	Akiko Honda	September 29, 1971 (age 55)	
LDP	#12	Muneo Suzuki	January 31, 1948 (age 78)	
DPP	#1	Mami Tamura	April 23, 1976 (age 50)	
DPP	#2	Yoshifumi Hamano	December 21, 1960 (age 65)	
DPP	#3	Tetsuji Isozaki	April 7, 1969 (age 57)	
DPP	#4	Tatsuo Ito	May 17, 1965 (age 61)	
DPP	#5	Yasushi Adachi	October 14, 1965 (age 61)	
DPP	#6	Kota Hirado	July 1, 1987 (age 39)	
DPP	#7	Yoshihiko Yamada	September 7, 1962 (age 64)	
Sanseitō	#1	Mizuho Umemura	September 10, 1978 (age 48)	
Sanseitō	#2	Yuji Adachi	June 29, 1982 (age 44)	
Sanseitō	#3	Hiroshi Ando	March 28, 1965 (age 61)	
Sanseitō	#4	Manabu Matsuda	November 11, 1957 (age 69)	
Sanseitō	#5	Mana Iwamoto	December 4, 1964 (age 61)	
Sanseitō	#6	Sen Yamanaka	August 7, 1958 (age 68)	
Sanseitō	#7	Shota Goto	January 7, 1983 (age 43)	
CDP	#1	Renhō	November 28, 1967 (age 58)	
CDP	#2	Makiko Kishi	March 24, 1976 (age 50)	
CDP	#3	Saori Yoshikawa	October 9, 1976 (age 50)	
CDP	#4	Shunichi Mizuoka	June 13, 1956 (age 70)	
CDP	#5	Masahito Ozawa	August 13, 1965 (age 61)	
CDP	#6	Ryo Kōriyama	February 24, 1974 (age 52)	
CDP	#7	Yuko Mori	April 20, 1956 (age 70)	
Komeito	#1	Daisaku Hiraki	October 16, 1974 (age 52)	
Komeito	#2	Takashi Tsukasa	December 15, 1979 (age 46)	
Komeito	#3	Masafumi Sasaki	January 4, 1981 (age 45)	
Komeito	#4	Daijiro Harada	October 29, 1977 (age 49)	
Ishin	#1	Yukiko Kada	May 18, 1950 (age 76)	
Ishin	#2	Megumi Ishii	October 18, 1958 (age 68)	
Ishin	#3	Takumi Shibata	December 11, 1960 (age 65)	
Ishin	#4	Hei Seki	January 30, 1962 (age 64)	
Reiwa	#1	Kenji Isezaki	July 6, 1957 (age 69)	
Reiwa	#2	Eiko Kimura	May 11, 1965 (age 61)	
Reiwa	#3	Fumiyo Okuda	June 11, 1977 (age 49)	
CPJ	#1	Haruo Kitamura	March 10, 1956 (age 70)	
CPJ	#2	Naoki Hyakuta	February 23, 1956 (age 70)	
JCP	#1	Akira Koike	June 9, 1960 (age 66)	
JCP	#2	Yōko Shirakawa	April 14, 1966 (age 60)	
Mirai	#1	Takahiro Anno	December 1, 1990 (age 35)	
SDP	#1	LaSalle Ishii	October 19, 1955 (age 71)	

== See also ==
- Senate (Japan)
- List of districts of the House of Councillors of Japan
- List of current members of the House of Representatives of Japan
