= Nishikawa =

Nishikawa may refer to:

== Places ==
- Nishikawa, Yamagata, a town in Yamagata Prefecture, Japan
- Nishikawa, Niigata, a town in Niigata Prefecture, Japan
- Mount Nishikawa, a mountain located in Hokkaidō, Japan

== People with the surname ==
=== Science and engineering ===
- Joken Nishikawa (1648–1724), Japanese geographer and astronomer
- Shoji Nishikawa (1884–1952), Japanese physicist and crystallographer
- Kōichirō Nishikawa (1949–2018), Japanese elementary particle physicist

=== Writer ===
- Mitsuru Nishikawa (1908–1999), Japanese writer and literary figure

=== Politics ===
- Issei Nishikawa (born 1945), former Japanese governor of Fukui prefecture
- Tomoo Nishikawa (西川 知雄; born 1948), Japanese lawyer and politician
- Jun Nishikawa (JRA member) (西川 純; born 1950), Japanese communist and hijacker

=== TV, film and entertainment ===
- Katsumi Nishikawa (1918–2010), Japanese film director
- Ikuo Nishikawa (born 1940), a voice actor
- Kiyoshi Nishikawa (born 1946), a comedian, former member of Senate (Japan)
- Mineko Nishikawa (born 1958), a singer
- Takanori Nishikawa (born 1970) aka T.M.Revolution, a musician
- Ayako Nishikawa (born 1971), a medical doctor, a TV talent
- Helen Nishikawa, a TV talent in Japan, wife of Kiyoshi Nishikawa (described below)

=== Sports ===
- Junji Nishikawa (1907-?), Japanese football player
- Keiji Nishikawa (西川 慶二; born 1961), Japanese shogi player
- Tetsu Nishikawa (西川 哲; born 1968), Japanese golfer
- Daisuke Nishikawa (born 1970), former Japanese gymnast
- Kazuhiro Nishikawa (born 1986), Japanese shogi player
- Shusaku Nishikawa (born 1986), a football (soccer) player (goalkeeper)
- Emily Nishikawa (born 1989), former Canadian cross-country skier
- Takanobu Nishikawa (born 1992), Japanese basketball player
- Manaya Nishikawa (born 1999), Japanese baseball player
- So Nishikawa (born 2001), Japanese-Australian association football player
- Jun Nishikawa (footballer) (西川 潤; born 2002), Japanese footballer
