= Rie Sasaki =

- 佐々木 理江
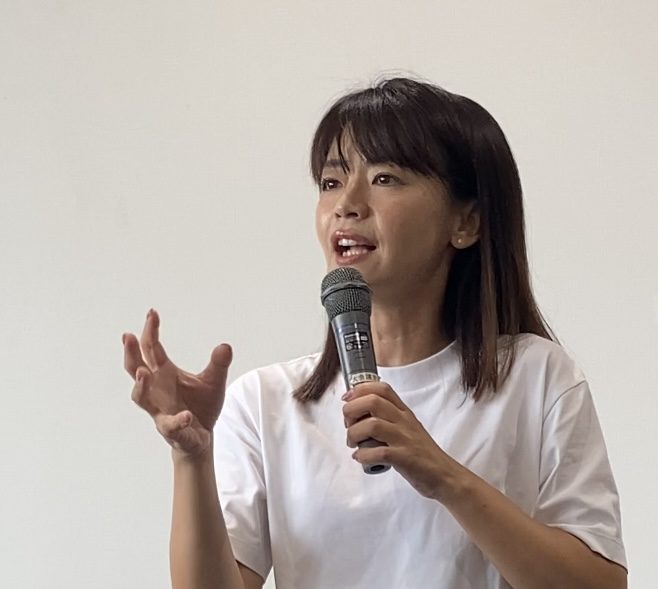
- Sasaki in 2025

Member of the House of Councillors
- Incumbent
- Assumed office 29 July 2025
- Preceded by: Mizuho Umemura
- Constituency: Osaka at-large

Member of the Osaka City Council
- In office 13 April 2015 – 11 June 2025
- Constituency: Suminoe Ward

Personal details
- Born: 24 August 1982 (age 44) Takata, Hiroshima, Japan
- Party: Innovation
- Other political affiliations: JRP (2012–2014)
- Education: Shimane University

Rie Sasaki (born 24 August 1982) is a Japanese politician, representing Osaka in the House of Councillors of Japan for the Japan Innovation Party since 2025.

== Youth and pre-election career ==
Sasaki was born on 24 August 1982 in Hiroshima Prefecture. She began her career in the entertainment industry, becoming an idol. She was discovered in 2006 while still studying science and engineering at Shimane University and became a model after graduation. Sasaki already had the desire to pursue a political career later, and thus refused certain contracts requiring her to wear a swimsuit. She subsequently joined a political school run by Takashi Kawamura, the mayor of Nagoya, before joining the Japan Restoration Party in 2012, praising the policies of Tōru Hashimoto, mayor and governor of Osaka.

== Electoral career ==
Sasaki began her political career in 2012, when she ran for the 2012 Japanese general election, representing the Japan Restoration Party in the twenty-first district of Tokyo. She was not elected in this election, nor did she manage to secure a seat through proportional representation.

She nevertheless continued in politics, and was elected as a city councilor in Osaka in 2015, a position she held until 2025 after two re-elections. In November 2024, she became chair of the General Affairs Committee of the Japan Innovation Party, the successor to the ARJ. In 2025, she ran in the internal party primary to be the party's female candidate for the 2025 Japanese House of Councillors election in Osaka Prefecture. She won this election, coming in ahead of incumbent councilor Mizuho Umemura. She also won the national election in July, and thus entered the Diet of Japan, after having focused her campaign on the abolition of the consumption tax, and having called for the establishment of universal child care paid for by the prefecture.

== Political positions ==
Sasaki favours amending Japan's anti-militarist constitution and also favours explicitly mentioning the existence of the Japan Self-Defense Forces.

Internationally, Sasaki favors strengthening the Japanese-American alliance.

Sasaki supports attempts to change Japan's law requiring spouses to have the same surname. She also supports Japan's recognition of same-sex marriage. However, Sasaki opposes policies aimed at establishing quotas for women in political office. She also opposes the idea of a woman being allowed to ascend to the Chrysanthemum Throne.

== Personal life ==
Sasaki married a boat driver in 2013. She lists Formula 1 and stock exchange racing as her main hobbies. She maintains a personal blog dedicated to racing chronicles.

== See also ==
- List of current members of the House of Councillors
- Women in Japan
