= Shigeki Sato =

Shigeki Sato may refer to:

- Shigeki Sato (wrestler) (佐藤 茂樹, born 1969), better known as Dick Togo, Japanese professional wrestler
- Shigeki Sato (politician) (佐藤 茂樹, born 1959), Japanese politician
