= KWU =

KWU may refer to

- Kansas Wesleyan University, United States
- Kyoto Women's University, Japan
