= Akira Nishino =

Akira Nishino may refer to:

- Akira Nishino (footballer) (born 1955), Japanese football player and manager
- Akira Nishino (politician) (born 1940), Japanese politician
