= Eiichi Yamashita =

Japanese politician (born 1947)

- 山下 栄一
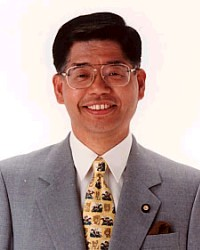
- Official portrait, 2002

Member of the House of Councillors
- In office 27 July 1992 – 25 July 2010
- Preceded by: Akinori Mineyama
- Succeeded by: Hirotaka Ishikawa
- Constituency: Osaka at-large

Personal details
- Born: 18 August 1947 (age 79) Toyonaka, Osaka, Japan
- Party: Komeito (1998–2010)
- Other political affiliations: CGP (1992–1994); NFP (1994–1998)
- Education: Kyoto University; Osaka City University

Eiichi Yamashita (山下 栄一, Yamashita Eiichi; born August 18, 1947) is a former Japanese politician of the New Komeito Party, who served as a member of the House of Councillors in the Diet (national legislature). A native of Toyonaka, Osaka, he graduated from Kyoto University and received a master's degree in law from Osaka City University, he was elected for the first time in 1992.
