= Osaka 13th district =

- Parliamentary constituency for the Japanese House of Representatives
- Numbered map of the Osaka Prefecture single seats
- Prefecture: Osaka
- Proportional District: Kinki
- Electorate: 396,307

Current constituency
- Created: 1994
- Seats: One
- Party: Ishin
- Representative: Ryohei Iwatani
- Municipalities: Higashiōsaka.

Osaka 13th district (大阪府第13区, Osaka-fu dai-ju-sanku or simply 大阪13区, Osaka-ju-sanku ) is a single-member constituency of the House of Representatives in the national Diet of Japan located in Osaka Prefecture.

== Areas covered ==
=== Since 1994 ===
- Higashiōsaka

== List of representatives ==
Election	Representative	Party	Notes
1996	Akira Nishino	New Frontier	
1996	Akira Nishino	Liberal	
1996	Akira Nishino	New Conservative	
1996	Akira Nishino	LDP	
2000	Masajuro Shiokawa	LDP	
2003	Akira Nishino	LDP	
2005	Akira Nishino	LDP	
2009	Akira Nishino	LDP	
2012	Kōichi Nishino	Restoration	
2012	Kōichi Nishino	PFG	
2014	Kōichi Munekiyo	LDP	
2017	Kōichi Munekiyo	LDP	
2021	Ryohei Iwatani	Ishin	
2024	Ryohei Iwatani	Ishin	
2026	Ryohei Iwatani	Ishin	

== Election results ==
=== 2026 ===
2026
Party	Candidate	Votes	%	±%
Ishin	Ryohei Iwatani	77,433	37.9	▼4.0
LDP	Kōichi Munekiyo (elected in Kinki PR block)	65,193	31.9	▼4.6
Centrist Reform	Hiranao Honda	26,573	13.0	
Sanseitō	Akitsuna Tatsuoka	14,949	7.3	
JCP	Terumi Takarai	10,197	5.0	▼4.8
Reiwa	Ai Yahata	10,097	4.9	▼6.8
Registered electors		394,984		
Turnout			53.54	▲3.99
Ishin hold				

=== 2024 ===
2024
Party	Candidate	Votes	%	±%
Ishin	Ryohei Iwatani	79,898	41.91	
LDP	Kōichi Munekiyo	69,600	36.51	
Reiwa	Ai Yahata (elected in Kinki PR block)	22,482	11.79	New
JCP	Terumi Takarai	18,657	9.79	
Majority		10,298	5.40	
Registered electors		395,868		
Turnout			49.55	▼3.88
Ishin hold				

=== 2021 ===
2021
Party	Candidate	Votes	%	±%
Ishin	Ryohei Iwatani	101,857	48.47	
LDP	Kōichi Munekiyo (Won PR seat)	85,321	40.60	
JCP	Junichi Kamino	22,982	10.94	
Majority		16,536	7.87	
Registered electors		400,235		
Turnout			53.43	▲7.80
Ishin gain from LDP				

=== 2017 ===
2017
Party	Candidate	Votes	%	±%
LDP	Kōichi Munekiyo	74,662	41.19	
Ishin	Yoshiaki Hoshino	52,033	28.71	New
Independent	Kōichi Nishino	23,584	13.01	New
JCP	Yoshikazu Nagaoka	16,399	9.05	
CDP	Hideki Kan	14,568	8.04	New
Majority		22,629	12.48	
Registered electors		404,319		
Turnout			45.63	▼3.23
LDP hold				

=== 2014 ===
2014
Party	Candidate	Votes	%	±%
LDP	Kōichi Munekiyo	91,931	49.31	
Future Generations	Kōichi Nishino	61,136	32.79	New
JCP	Emiko Aratani	33,384	17.90	
Majority		30,795	16.52	
Registered electors		397,435		
Turnout			48.86	
LDP gain from Future Generations				

=== 2012 ===
2012
Party	Candidate	Votes	%	±%
Restoration	Kōichi Nishino	109,756	51.46	New
LDP	Sohei Kamiya	58,465	27.41	
JCP	Hatsuyo Terayama	25,538	11.97	
Democratic	Toshikazu Higuchi	16,389	7.68	N/A
Independent	Kōichi Sarata	3,131	1.47	New
Majority		51,291	24.05	
Registered electors				
Turnout				
Restoration gain from LDP				

=== 2009 ===
2009
Party	Candidate	Votes	%	±%
LDP	Akira Nishino	107,807	43.45	
People's New	Junko Shiraishi	90,453	36.46	New
JCP	Hidekatsu Yoshii (Won PR seat)	45,716	18.43	
Happiness Realization	Tomokazu Ikuta	4,116	1.66	New
Majority		17,354	6.99	
Registered electors				
Turnout				
LDP hold				

=== 2005 ===
2005
Party	Candidate	Votes	%	±%
LDP	Akira Nishino	141,141	58.09	
Democratic	Takashi Fuke	60,791	25.02	
JCP	Hidekatsu Yoshii (Won PR seat)	41,017	16.88	
Majority		80,350	33.07	
Registered electors				
Turnout				
LDP hold				

=== 2003 ===
2003
Party	Candidate	Votes	%	±%
LDP	Akira Nishino	97,311	49.67	
Democratic	Junichiro Okamoto	65,164	33.26	
JCP	Hidekatsu Yoshii (Won PR seat)	33,446	17.07	
Majority		32,147	16.41	
Registered electors				
Turnout				
LDP hold				

=== 2000 ===
2000
Party	Candidate	Votes	%	±%
LDP	Masajuro Shiokawa	109,614	53.32	
JCP	Hidekatsu Yoshii (Won PR seat)	55,096	26.80	
Democratic	Junichiro Okamoto	35,759	17.39	New
Liberal League	Yoshio Sato	5,115	2.49	New
Majority		54,518	26.52	
Registered electors				
Turnout				
LDP hold				

=== 1996 ===
1996
Party	Candidate	Votes	%	±%
New Frontier	Akira Nishino	90,784	41.35	New
LDP	Masajuro Shiokawa	83,254	37.92	New
JCP	Kiyoshi Ukegawa	33,399	15.21	New
Democratic	Isao Aida	12,123	5.52	New
Majority		7,530	3.43	
Registered electors				
Turnout				
New Frontier win (new seat)				
