= Osaka 3rd district =

- Parliamentary constituency for the Japanese House of Representatives
- Numbered map of the Osaka city single seats
- Prefecture: Osaka
- Proportional District: Kinki
- Electorate: 357,873

Current constituency
- Created: 1994
- Seats: One
- Party: Ishin
- Representative: Tōru Azuma
- Municipalities: Nishinari-ku, Suminoe-ku, Sumiyosho-ku, and Taisho-ku of Osaka.

Osaka 3rd district (大阪府第3区, Osaka-fu dai-sanku or simply 大阪3区, Osaka-sanku ) is a single-member constituency of the House of Representatives in the national Diet of Japan located in Osaka Prefecture.

== Areas covered ==
=== Since 1994 ===
- Part of Osaka
  - Nishinari-ku
  - Suminoe-ku
  - Sumiyoshi-ku
  - Taisho-ku

== List of representatives ==
Election	Representative	Party	Notes
1996	Masahiro Tabata	New Frontier	
2000	Masahiro Tabata	Komeito	
2003	Masahiro Tabata	Komeito	
2005	Masahiro Tabata	Komeito	
2009	Masazumi Nakajima	Democratic	
2009	Masazumi Nakajima	Independent	
2009	Masazumi Nakajima	PNP	
2012	Shigeki Sato	Komeito	
2014	Shigeki Sato	Komeito	
2017	Shigeki Sato	Komeito	
2021	Shigeki Sato	Komeito	
2024	Tōru Azuma	Ishin	
2026	Tōru Azuma	Ishin	

== Election results ==
=== 2026 ===
2026
Party	Candidate	Votes	%	±%
Ishin	Tōru Azuma	75,462	40.4	▼0.9
LDP	Akira Yanagimoto	45,715	24.4	
Centrist Reform	Yūko Utsunomiya	30,714	16.4	▲3.8
Sanseitō	Takafumi Yamamuro	18,345	9.8	
JCP	Yui Watanabe	16,758	9.0	▼2.3
Registered electors		355,049		
Turnout			53.89	▲2.03
Ishin hold				

=== 2024 ===
2024
Party	Candidate	Votes	%	±%
Ishin	Tōru Azuma	74,546	41.31	
Komeito	Shigeki Sato	52,107	28.87	▼15.8
CDP	Hitoshi Hagihara	22,878	12.68	▼10.8
JCP	Yui Watanabe	22,218	12.31	▼9.1
Independent	Eitaro Chujo	8,726	4.84	
Majority		22,439	12.44	
Registered electors		358,774		
Turnout			51.86	▼2.01
Ishin gain from Komeito				

=== 2021 ===
2021
Party	Candidate	Votes	%	±%
Komeito	Shigeki Sato	79,507	44.65	
CDP	Hitoshi Hagihara	41,737	23.44	New
JCP	Yui Watanabe	38,170	21.44	
Independent	Eitaro Chujo	18,637	10.47	
Majority		37,770	21.21	
Registered electors		367,518		
Turnout			53.87	▲7.99
Komeito hold				

=== 2017 ===
2017
Party	Candidate	Votes	%	±%
Komeito	Shigeki Sato	83,907	54.10	
JCP	Yui Watanabe	54,958	35.43	
Independent	Eitaro Chujo	16,231	10.47	New
Majority		28,949	18.67	
Registered electors		376,572		
Turnout			45.88	▼0.81
Komeito hold				

=== 2014 ===
2014
Party	Candidate	Votes	%	±%
Komeito	Shigeki Sato	84,943	57.21	
JCP	Yui Watanabe	63,529	42.79	
Majority		21,414	14.42	
Registered electors		375,218		
Turnout			46.69	▼9.90
Komeito hold				

=== 2012 ===
2012
Party	Candidate	Votes	%	±%
Komeito	Shigeki Sato	101,910	53.19	
JCP	Yui Watanabe	49,015	25.58	
Democratic	Kazutake Fujiwara	40,687	21.23	
Majority		52,895	27.61	
Registered electors		379,798		
Turnout			56.59	
Komeito gain from People's New				

=== 2009 ===
2009
Party	Candidate	Votes	%	±%
Democratic	Masazumi Nakajima	109,518	44.67	
Komeito	Masahiro Tabata	97,121	39.62	
JCP	Atsuko Chiba	32,432	13.23	
Happiness Realization	Yoshihiro Mori	6,078	2.48	New
Majority		12,397	5.05	
Registered electors				
Turnout				
Democratic gain from Komeito				

=== 2005 ===
2005
Party	Candidate	Votes	%	±%
Komeito	Masahiro Tabata	119,226	49.38	
Democratic	Megumu Tsuji	85,177	35.28	
JCP	Yoshitaka Adachi	37,040	15.34	
Majority		34,049	14.10	
Registered electors				
Turnout				
Komeito hold				

=== 2003 ===
2003
Party	Candidate	Votes	%	±%
Komeito	Masahiro Tabata	97,552	46.33	
Democratic	Megumu Tsuji (Won PR seat)	79,539	37.78	New
JCP	Yoshitaka Adachi	33,451	15.89	
Majority		18,013	8.55	
Registered electors				
Turnout				
Komeito hold				

=== 2000 ===
2000
Party	Candidate	Votes	%	±%
Komeito	Masahiro Tabata	90,605	46.10	New
JCP	Mieko Kobayashi	74,055	37.68	
Liberal League	Keiko Hasegawa	31,898	16.23	
Majority		16,550	8.42	
Registered electors				
Turnout				
Komeito hold				

=== 1996 ===
1996
Party	Candidate	Votes	%	±%
New Frontier	Masahiro Tabata	76,938	35.68	New
LDP	Takuji Yanagimoto (Won PR seat)	71,012	32.93	New
JCP	Morimasa Miyazaki	44,591	20.68	New
Liberal League	Taiji Nakamura	23,088	10.71	New
Majority		5,926	2.75	
Registered electors				
Turnout				
New Frontier win (new seat)				
