= Kazuyoshi Shirahama =

Japanese politician (born 1947)

- 白浜 一良

Member of the House of Councillors
- In office 23 July 1989 – 28 July 2013
- Preceded by: Hidekatsu Yoshii
- Succeeded by: Hisatake Sugi
- Constituency: Osaka at-large

Personal details
- Born: 6 July 1947 (age 79) Yamatokōriyama, Nara, Japan
- Party: Komeito (since 1998)
- Other political affiliations: CGP (1989–1994); NFP (1994–1998)
- Education: Kyoto University

Kazuyoshi Shirahama (白浜 一良, Shirahama Kazuyoshi; born July 6, 1947) is a Japanese politician of the New Komeito Party, a member of the House of Councillors in the Diet (national legislature). A native of Yamatokōriyama, Nara and graduate of Kyoto University, he was elected to the House of Councillors for the first time in 2001.
