= Kaori Takagi =

- 高木 かおり
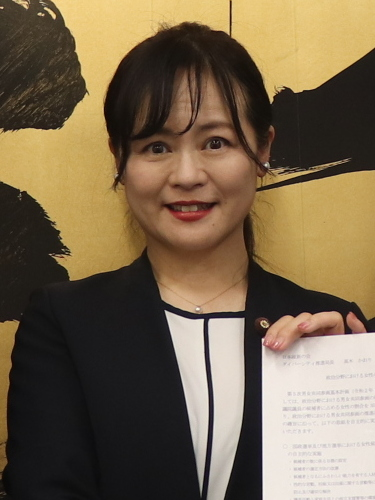
- Takagi in 2023

Member of the House of Councillors
- Incumbent
- Assumed office 26 July 2016
- Preceded by: Seat established
- Constituency: Osaka at-large

Member of the Sakai City Council
- In office 10 April 2011 – 9 June 2016
- Constituency: Minami Ward

Personal details
- Born: 10 October 1972 (age 54) Sakai, Osaka, Japan
- Party: Innovation (since 2022)
- Other political affiliations: LDP (2011–2016); Independent (2016); ORA (2016–2022)
- Education: Kyoto Women's University

Kaori Takagi is a Japanese politician who is a member of the House of Councillors of Japan.

== Career ==
Born in Osaka, she attended Kyoto Women's University, Faculty of Home Economics. She was elected in 2016 and re-elected in 2022.
