= Ryohei Iwatani =

Japanese politician (born 1980)

- 岩谷 良平
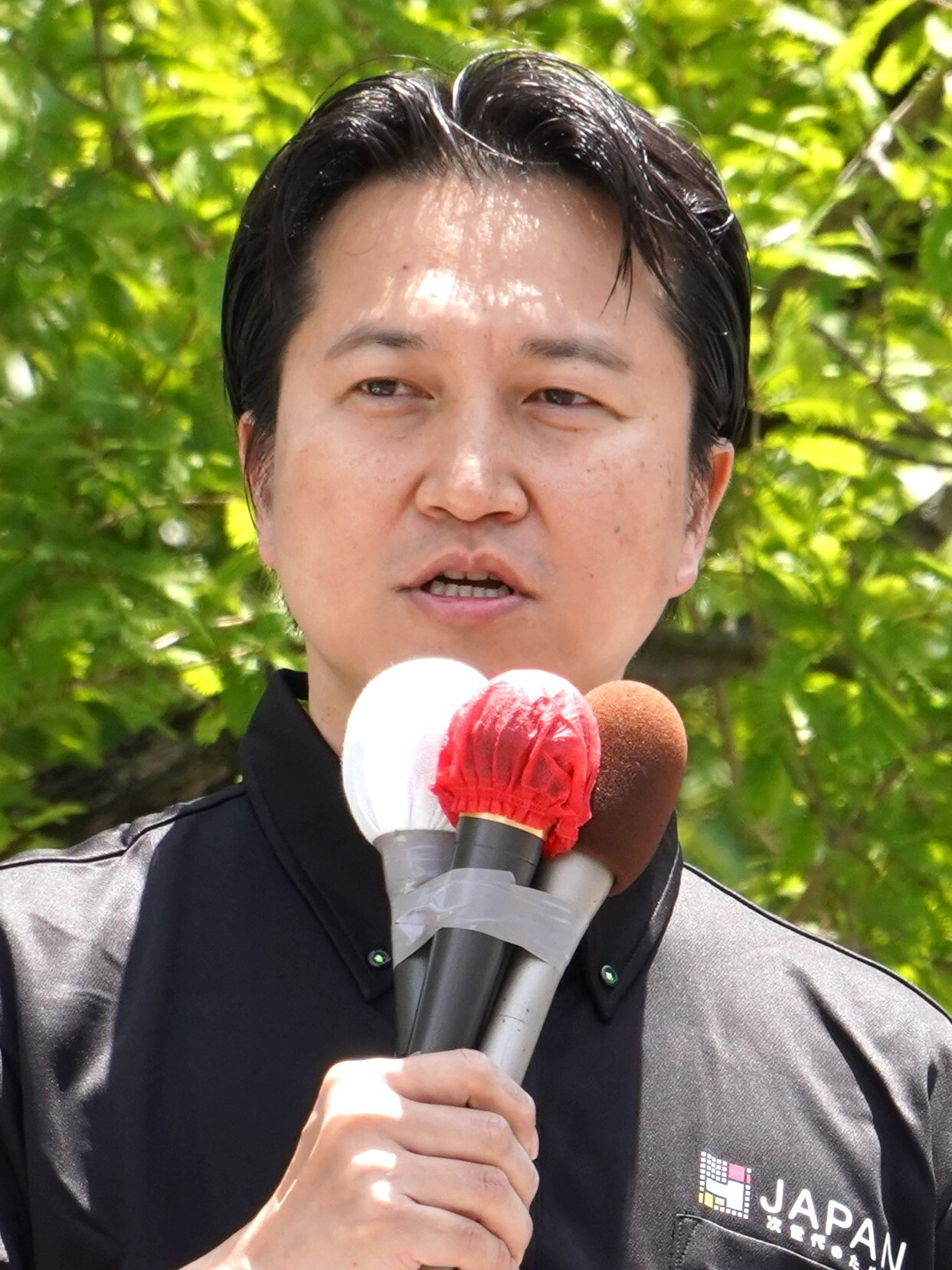
- Iwatani in 2025

Member of the House of Representatives
- Incumbent
- Assumed office 2 November 2021
- Preceded by: Kōichi Munekiyo
- Constituency: Osaka 13th

Member of the Osaka Prefectural Assembly
- In office 2011–2015
- Constituency: Higashinari Ward, Osaka City

Personal details
- Born: 7 June 1980 (age 46) Moriguchi, Osaka, Japan
- Party: Innovation
- Education: Kyoto Sangyo University

Ryohei Iwatani (岩谷良平, Iwatani Ryohei; born 7 June 1980) is a Japanese politician serving as a member of the House of Representatives since 2021. He has served as secretary general of the Japan Innovation Party since 2024. From 2011 to 2015, he was a member of the Osaka Prefectural Assembly.
