= Shuzen Tanigawa =

Japanese politician (born 1934)

- 谷川 秀善
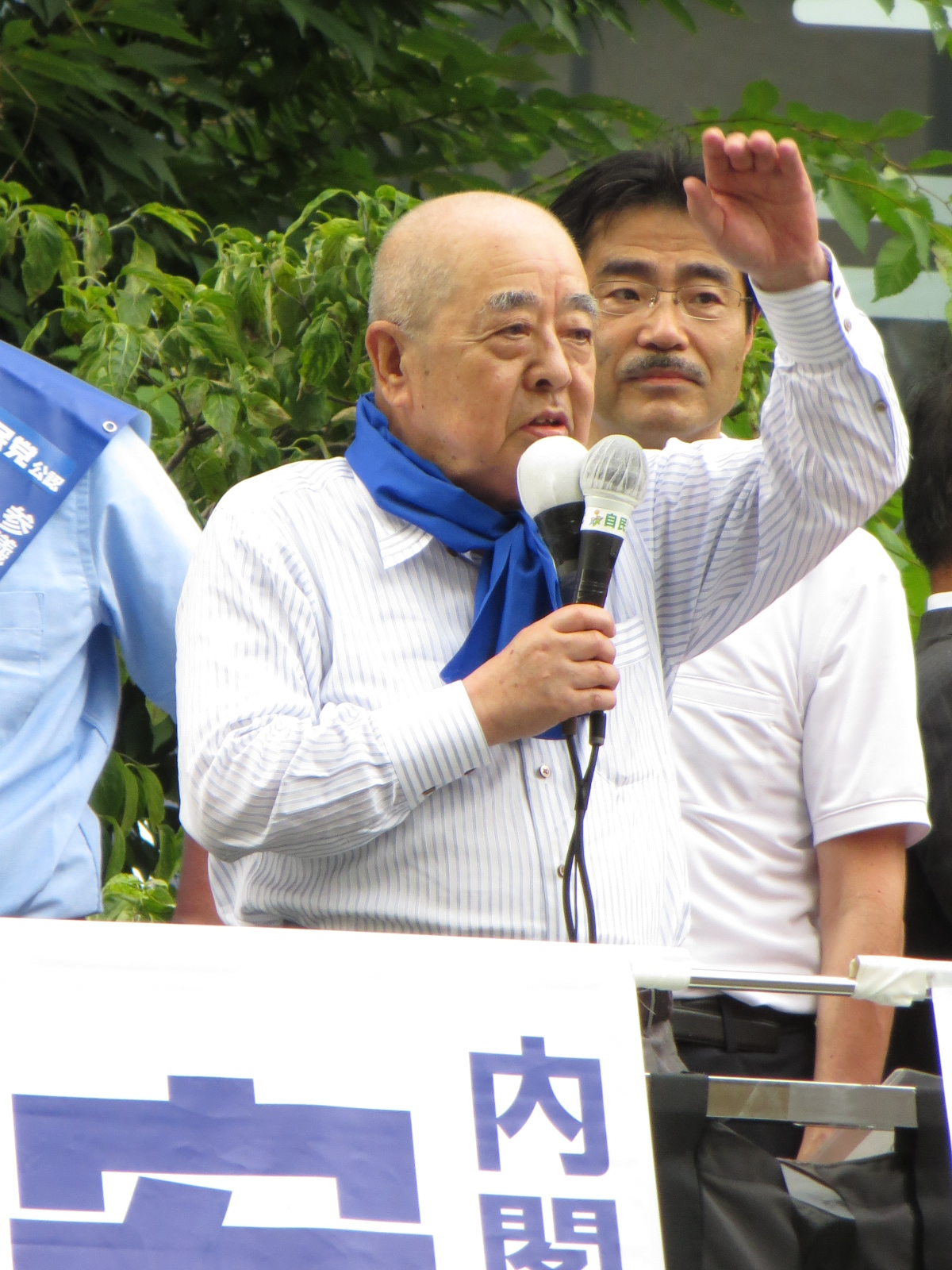
- Tanigawa in 2013

Member of the House of Councillors
- In office 23 July 1995 – 28 July 2013
- Preceded by: Takashi Tanihata
- Succeeded by: Takuji Yanagimoto
- Constituency: Osaka at-large

Personal details
- Born: 3 February 1934 (age 92) Amagasaki, Hyōgo, Japan
- Party: Liberal Democratic
- Children: Tomu Tanigawa
- Education: University of Osaka

Shuzen Tanigawa (谷川 秀善, Tanigawa Shūzen; born February 3, 1934) is a Japanese politician of the Liberal Democratic Party, a member of the House of Councillors in the Diet (national legislature).

== Early life ==
Tanigawa is a native of Amagasaki, Hyogo and a graduate of Osaka University. He joined the government of Osaka Prefecture in 1957.

== Political career ==
After serving as deputy mayor of Osaka Prefecture, he was elected to the House of Councillors for the first time in 1995. He served in the House of Councillors until 2013.
