= Tōru Azuma =

Japanese politician

- 東 徹
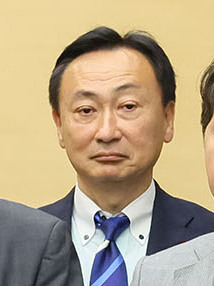
- Azuma in 2025

Member of the House of Representatives
- Incumbent
- Assumed office 29 October 2024
- Preceded by: Shigeki Sato
- Constituency: Osaka 3rd

Member of the House of Councillors
- In office 29 July 2013 – 15 October 2024
- Preceded by: Satoshi Umemura
- Succeeded by: Futoshi Okazaki
- Constituency: Osaka at-large

Member of the Osaka Prefectural Assembly
- In office 30 April 2003 – 2013
- Constituency: Osaka City Suminoe Ward

Personal details
- Born: 16 September 1966 (age 59) Suminoe, Osaka, Japan
- Party: Innovation (since 2016)
- Other political affiliations: LDP (2003–2010); ORA (2010–2012); JRP (2012–2014); JIP (2014–2016)
- Education: Kindai University; Toyo University

Tōru Azuma (born September 16, 1966 in Osaka Prefecture, Japan) is a Japanese politician who has served as a member of the House of Representatives and the House of Councillors. He represents the Osaka Prefecture and is a member of the Japan Innovation Party.
