= Osaka 14th district =

- Parliamentary constituency for the Japanese House of Representatives
- Numbered map of the Osaka Prefecture single seats
- Prefecture: Osaka
- Proportional District: Kinki
- Electorate: 412,303

Current constituency
- Created: 1994
- Seats: One
- Party: Ishin
- Representative: Hitoshi Aoyagi
- Municipalities: Fujiidera, Habikino, Kashiwara, and Yao.

Osaka 14th district (大阪府第14区, Osaka-fu dai-ju-yonku or simply 大阪14区, Osaka-ju-yonku ) is a single-member constituency of the House of Representatives in the national Diet of Japan located in Osaka Prefecture.

== Areas covered ==
=== Since 1994 ===
- Fujiidera
- Habikino
- Kashiwara
- Yao

== List of representatives ==
Election	Representative	Party	Notes
1996	Eiichi Nakamura	New Frontier	
1996	Eiichi Nakamura	Liberal	
1996	Eiichi Nakamura	New Conservative	
2000	Takashi Tanihata	LDP	
2003	Takashi Tanihata	LDP	
2005	Takashi Tanihata	LDP	
2009	Takashi Nagao	Democratic	
2009	Takashi Nagao	Independent	
2009	Takashi Nagao	LDP	
2012	Takashi Tanihata	Restoration	
2014	Takashi Tanihata	Innovation	
2014	Takashi Tanihata	Ishin	
2017	Takashi Nagao	LDP	
2021	Hitoshi Aoyagi	Ishin	
2024	Hitoshi Aoyagi	Ishin	
2026	Hitoshi Aoyagi	Ishin	

== Election results ==
=== 2026 ===
2026
Party	Candidate	Votes	%	±%
Ishin	Hitoshi Aoyagi	121,049	57.8	▲12.6
LDP	Motoyuki Odachi	58,573	28.0	▼5.9
JCP	Kōichi Naitō	29,935	14.3	▲1.7
Registered electors		410,475		
Turnout			55.01	▲2.63
Ishin hold				

=== 2024 ===
2024
Party	Candidate	Votes	%	±%
Ishin	Hitoshi Aoyagi	95,362	45.16	
LDP	Norifumi Shiokawa	71,539	33.88	
JCP	Koichi Naito	26,534	12.57	
Sanseitō	Ranna Sakai	17,708	8.39	New
Majority		23,823	11.28	
Registered electors		413,837		
Turnout			52.38	▼2.90
Ishin hold				

=== 2021 ===
2021
Party	Candidate	Votes	%	±%
Ishin	Hitoshi Aoyagi	126,307	55.67	
LDP	Takashi Nagao	70,029	30.87	
JCP	Hisashi Komatsu	30,547	13.46	
Majority		56,278	24.80	
Registered electors		421,826		
Turnout			55.28	▲8.43
Ishin gain from LDP				

=== 2017 ===
2017
Party	Candidate	Votes	%	±%
LDP	Takashi Nagao	79,352	41.08	
Ishin	Takashi Tanihata (Won PR seat)	77,696	40.23	New
JCP	Hisashi Komatsu	36,102	18.69	
Majority		1,656	0.85	
Registered electors		427,974		
Turnout			46.85	▼3.60
LDP gain from Ishin				

=== 2014 ===
2014
Party	Candidate	Votes	%	±%
Innovation	Takashi Tanihata	78,332	38.76	New
LDP	Takashi Nagao (elected in Kinki PR block)	76,555	37.88	
JCP	Michiaki Nozawa	35,194	17.41	
Future Generations	Hiroshi Miyake	12,030	5.95	New
Majority		1,777	0.88	
Registered electors		419,584		
Turnout			50.45	
Innovation hold				

=== 2012 ===
2012
Party	Candidate	Votes	%	±%
Restoration	Takashi Tanihata	108,989	48.58	New
LDP	Takashi Nagao	61,503	27.41	
JCP	Michiaki Nozawa	32,290	14.39	
Democratic	Hōkitsu Torii	21,584	9.62	
Majority		47,486	21.17	
Registered electors				
Turnout				
Restoration gain from LDP				

=== 2009 ===
2009
Party	Candidate	Votes	%	±%
Democratic	Takashi Nagao	136,798	48.37	
LDP	Takashi Tanihata (Won PR seat)	104,859	37.08	
JCP	Michiaki Nozawa	27,855	9.85	
Independent	Hiroshi Miyake	10,167	3.59	New
Happiness Realization	Yoshiaki Kitaguchi	3,143	1.11	New
Majority		31,939	11.29	
Registered electors				
Turnout				
Democratic gain from LDP				

=== 2005 ===
2005
Party	Candidate	Votes	%	±%
LDP	Takashi Tanihata	151,852	54.91	
Democratic	Takashi Nagao	89,142	32.23	
JCP	Michiaki Nozawa	35,560	12.86	
Majority		62,710	22.68	
Registered electors				
Turnout				
LDP hold				

=== 2003 ===
2003
Party	Candidate	Votes	%	±%
LDP	Takashi Tanihata	111,543	50.37	
Democratic	Takashi Nagao	78,654	35.52	
JCP	Michiaki Nozawa	31,256	14.11	
Majority		32,889	14.85	
Registered electors				
Turnout				
LDP hold				

=== 2000 ===
2000
Party	Candidate	Votes	%	±%
LDP	Takashi Tanihata	105,624	46.67	
Democratic	Takashi Yamamoto	67,598	29.87	New
JCP	Michiaki Nozawa	45,471	20.09	
Liberal League	Yūki Kozuru	7,606	3.36	
Majority		38,026	16.80	
Registered electors				
Turnout				
LDP gain from New Conservative				

=== 1996 ===
1996
Party	Candidate	Votes	%	±%
New Frontier	Eiichi Nakamura	85,033	38.09	New
LDP	Takashi Tanihata (Won PR seat)	79,347	35.54	New
JCP	Keiji Sato	46,410	20.79	New
Liberal League	Tatsuki Komuro	12,459	5.58	New
Majority		5,686	2.55	
Registered electors				
Turnout				
New Frontier win (new seat)				
