= Death of Wishma Sandamali =

2021 death in Japanese immigration custody

Wishma Sandamali
- Born: Rathnayake Liyanage Wishma Sandamali; December 5, 1987; Elpitiya, Sri Lanka
- Died: March 6, 2021 (aged 33); Minato-ku, Nagoya, Japan
- Other names: Wishma Rathnayake

Rathnayake Liyanage Wishma Sandamali (Note: The family name is also commonly spelled Ratnayake, though her passport and papers released by Silumina spell it Rathnayake. According to Sinhalese naming customs, this person should be referred to by her first name, Wishma. Some American media have referred to her as Wishma Rathnayake.) (Sinhala: රත්නායක ලියනගේ විශ්මා සඳමාලි; December 5, 1987 – March 6, 2021) was a Sri Lankan woman who died in custody at an immigration detention facility in Nagoya, Japan, after her requests for provisional release and adequate medical care were denied. Japanese authorities detained Wishma in August 2020 for overstaying her visa, which was discovered after she reported experiencing domestic violence.

Wishma was the 17th person to die in Japanese immigration detention since 2007. Her death prompted renewed criticism of Japan's strict immigration control, which accepted only 0.4% of asylum applications in 2019. Prosecutors have dropped charges against immigration officials. Civil lawsuits against the Japanese government seeking compensation and the release of surveillance footage are ongoing.

== Early life ==
Wishma Sandamali was born in Elpitiya, Sri Lanka, on December 5, 1987. She arrived in Japan in June 2017 on a student visa to attend a Japanese-language school in Chiba Prefecture. She soon began missing classes as she suffered violence from her Sri Lankan boyfriend who was living with her, and allowance from her family stopped coming. Unable to pay the tuition, she was expelled from the school and lost her visa status in June 2018.

== Detention ==
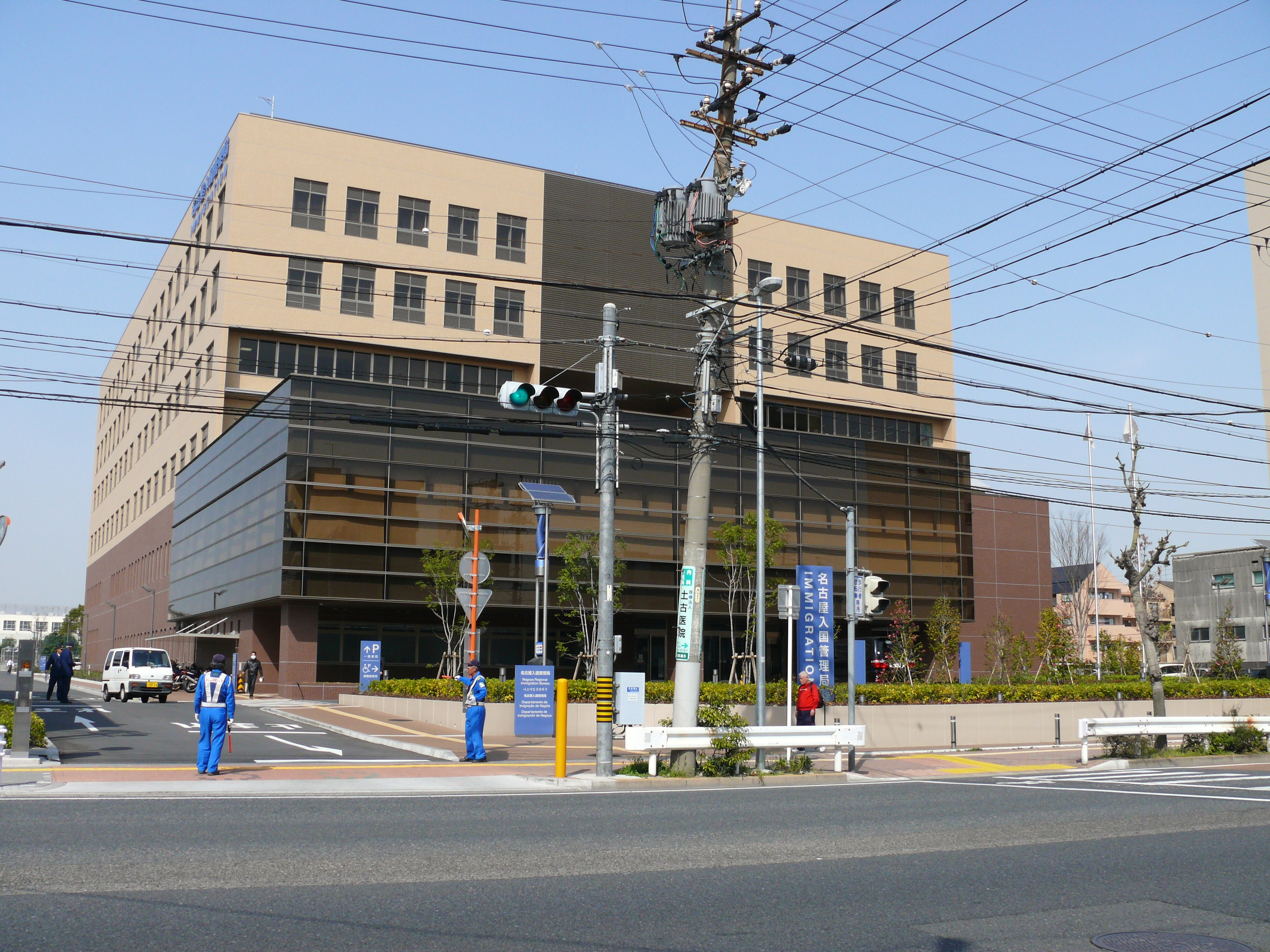
Detention center in Minato-ku, Nagoya, where Wishma was held

In August 2020, Wishma went to a police station in Shimizu, Shizuoka, to seek shelter from her boyfriend's domestic violence, only to be sent to a detention facility run by the Nagoya Regional Immigration Services Bureau. This was despite a 2008 directive from Japan's Immigration Bureau (later Immigration Services Agency) to its facilities to treat domestic violence victims with appropriate care and possibly grant them residency.

Wishma stated that she wanted to return to Sri Lanka, but she was put on a waiting list as she could not afford a flight home as commercial flights were unavailable due to the COVID-19 pandemic. After receiving threats from her ex and being offered potential accommodation from a supporter, she decided to ask to stay in Japan, and applied for provisional release on January 4, 2021, which was rejected on February 16.

Around mid-January 2021, she became ill and began experiencing a range of symptoms such as nausea, vomiting, loss of appetite, numbness, and difficulty walking. On February 5, a gastroenterologist saw her and suspected she had reflux esophagitis, and prescribed medication, which the doctor said should be administered intravenously if she could not take it orally. When a supporter met her on February 9, she was on a wheelchair, carrying a bucket for vomiting, and had lost 15.5 kilograms (34 lb). A urine test on February 15 showed she was in a state of starvation. On February 22, she filed another application for provisional release. As her condition deteriorated, Wishma repeatedly made requests to see a doctor at a hospital, which the facility denied on the grounds that an appointment had already been set. On March 4, a psychiatrist saw her, prescribed an antipsychotic, and recommended provisional release. Two days later, she was found unresponsive and taken to a hospital, where she was pronounced dead. Although her blood pressure and pulse had been undetectable since the morning of March 5, an ambulance was not called until 2:15 pm on March 6. An autopsy report disclosed to parliament members named a complication from thyroiditis and failure of organs such as the kidneys as the likely cause of her death.

According to the Immigration Services Agency's report, supporters visited Wishma 25 times, and between February 3 and March 3 made four requests that she be taken to a hospital, receive intravenous therapy, and be granted provisional release. Top officials of the bureau were aware of neither the requests nor the psychiatrist's recommendation for release. On March 1, an officer made a mocking remark when Wishma had trouble swallowing drink and it regurgitated through her nose. On the day she died, an officer asked her if she was "high", referring to the antipsychotic she had taken. The report said some detention officers believed detainees would exaggerate their health problems in order to obtain provisional release.

== Response ==
A funeral was held on May 16, 2021. On May 17, two sisters of Wishma visited the Nagoya bureau, and told the press the bureau failed to provide an adequate explanation of what led to her death. The sisters met Minister of Justice Yōko Kamikawa on May 18 and asked her to release surveillance footage of Wishma in detention, which the agency had refused citing security and privacy.

=== Reports by the immigration agency ===
On April 9, 2021, the Immigration Services Agency published an interim report about the event, which did not specify the cause of her death. In May 2021, it was reported that the interim report falsely stated that the gastroenterologist who saw Wishma never recommended intravenous therapy or hospitalization, despite her medical records showing they indeed did. The Ministry of Justice explained that, even though it had obtained the medical records, the report stated that there was no recommendation because the bureau had told the ministry that the records were not factual.

On August 10, 2021, the agency published a "final report", admonished the then-director and the deputy director-general of the bureau, and reprimanded two other officials. The report concluded that Wishma died of an illness, but it said multiple factors likely contributed to her death and the cause of death could not be determined. The report blamed the bureau's lack of an adequate reporting system and of medical care on weekends. The sisters said they were skeptical of the report. A lawyer for the family said, "The immigration office shifted responsibility to the local bureau's medical care system and its officers' morality. It is trying to avoid liability and close this case with light punishments."

=== Showing and preservation of surveillance footage ===
On August 12, 2021, the agency showed the sisters edited footage of the final two weeks of Wishma in detention. Although the footage was two hours long, the sisters stopped watching about 70 minutes in as they were disturbed by the content. Footage showed Wishma, on February 26, fall out of bed and ask for help over the intercom 23 times in the course of three hours, only to have a blanket put over her. One of the sisters said, "I feel officials treated my sister like an animal and killed her."

On September 6, 2021, the Nagoya District Court granted the family's request to preserve 295-hour surveillance footage of Wishma from February 22 until her death, which was kept on dozens of DVDs. On October 1, one of the sisters and the family's lawyers saw some of the footage in a session that lasted about two and a half hours. The same day, a group submitted to the agency a petition with 93,148 signatures demanding public release of the entire footage.

Some footage was shown to members of the Judicial Affairs Committee at the lower and upper houses of the Diet on December 24 and 27, 2021, respectively. After seeing the footage, representative Ryuichi Yoneyama (independent), who is a physician, said, "It's obvious for anyone with medical expertise that she wasn't faking her illness, and leaving someone who is complaining about health issues as much as she did unattended is unthinkable at hospitals or nursing homes." Representative Takeshi Shina (CDP) said he found inconsistencies between the final report and the footage.

In February 2023, a five-hour clip of the footage was released to the public as a court record about the civil case. On April 6, 2023, lawyers for the family released seven clips of the footage to the public. On April 17, 2023, the footage was shown to members of the lower-house Judicial Affairs Committee.

=== Criminal complaints ===
On November 9, 2021, the sisters filed a criminal complaint with the Nagoya District Public Prosecutors Office against officials of the bureau. A university teacher also filed a complaint with the office in June 2021. On June 17, 2022, the prosecutors dropped the charges against 13 officials, saying they could not identify a causal link between the facility's treatment of Wishma and her death. On December 21, 2022, a committee for the inquest of prosecution found the prosecutors' decision inappropriate, directing them to reopen the case. On September 29, 2023, the prosecutors again dropped the charges.

=== Civil lawsuits ===
In March 2022, the mother and sisters of Wishma filed a lawsuit against the Japanese government, seeking 156 million yen in damages. In September 2022, the Nagoya District Court requested that the government submit five hours of the preserved surveillance footage as evidence. The government accepted the request on the day of the deadline to respond in November. The family received the footage on December 16, 2022. In February 2023, the court released a five-hour clip of the footage to the public as a record about the case. The clip was shown during the oral proceedings on June 21 and July 12, 2023.

On May 20, 2025, the family of Wishma sued the Japanese government demanding all 295 hours of the surveillance footage be disclosed.

=== Immigration revision bill ===
Wishma's death came at a time when the National Diet was to deliberate a government bill to revise the Immigration Control and Refugee Recognition Act, which would have allowed deportation of asylum seekers. On March 31, 2021, a group comprising the Working Group on Arbitrary Detention and three special rapporteurs of the United Nations issued a statement saying the bill could violate the International Covenant on Civil and Political Rights. Daily sit-ins in protest against the bill were staged in front of the Diet since April 16. On April 22, a group handed the Ministry of Justice 106,792 signatures demanding the bill be withdrawn. Protest rallies were staged across Japan on May 16 to coincide with Wishma's funeral. The ruling parties dropped the bill on May 18. The administration passed on resubmitting the bill to the Diet session beginning in January 2022, fearing impact on the upper-house election in July.

The government submitted a similar bill, which would limit the number of times a foreign national can apply for refugee status to two, to the Diet session beginning in January 2023. Amid protests, the bill was approved by the Cabinet on March 7 and was enacted by the Diet on June 9. On April 18, the Working Group on Arbitrary Detention and special rapporteurs of the United Nations issued a communication stating that the bill falls short of international human rights standards.

In May 2023, representative Mizuho Umemura was removed from the upper-house Judicial Affairs Committee by her party, Nippon Ishin no Kai, after she was criticized for remarking that Wishma "may have died from poor health caused by a hunger strike" and that her supporter may have given her "the faint hope that she would be released on parole if she became ill, leading to the situation where doctors pointed out the possibility that she was not really sick".
