= Masahiro Tabata =

Japanese politician (1940–2025)

- 田端 正広
- Official portrait, 2003

Member of the House of Representatives
- In office 19 July 1993 – 21 July 2009
- Preceded by: Teruji Kotani
- Succeeded by: Masazumi Nakajima
- Constituency: Osaka 1st (1993–1996); Osaka 3rd (1996–2009)

Personal details
- Born: 4 January 1940 Wakayama, Japan
- Died: 5 January 2025 (aged 85) Osaka, Japan
- Party: Komeito
- Other political affiliations: CGP (1986–1996); NFP (1996–1998)
- Education: Doshisha University

Masahiro Tabata (田端 正広, Tabata Masahiro; 4 January 1940 – 5 January 2025) was a Japanese politician who served in the House of Representatives in the Diet (national legislature) as a member of the New Komeito Party. A native of Wakayama, Wakayama and graduate of Doshisha University, he was elected for the first time in 1993 after working as a journalist. Tabata died from pneumonia on 5 January 2025, at the age of 85.

== Sources ==
- 政治家情報 〜田端 正広〜. ザ･選挙 (in Japanese). JANJAN.
