= Takuji Yanagimoto =

Japanese politician

- 柳本 卓治
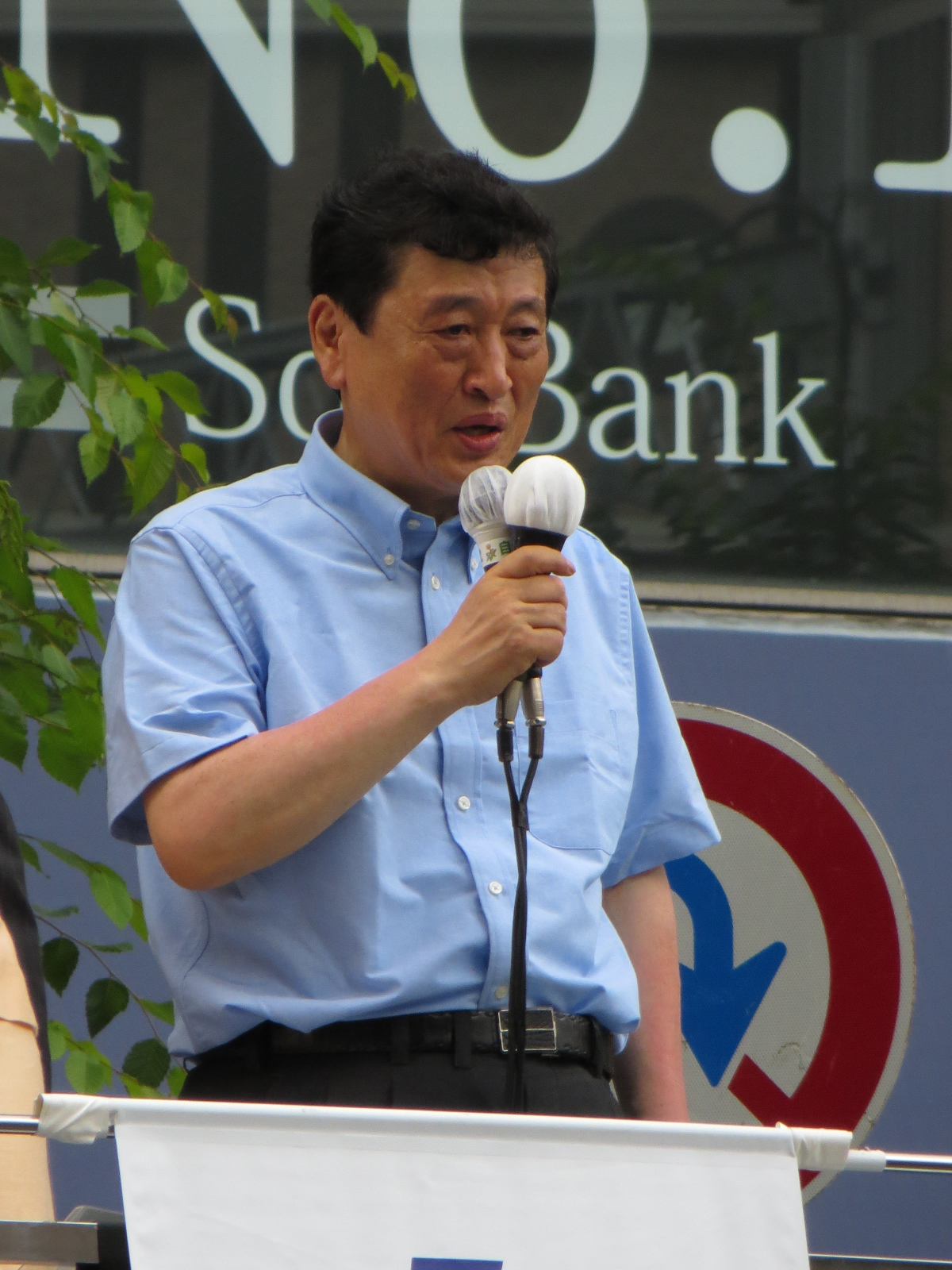
- Yanagimoto in 2013

Member of the House of Councillors
- In office 29 July 2013 – 28 July 2019
- Preceded by: Shuzen Tanigawa
- Succeeded by: Fusae Ohta
- Constituency: Osaka at-large

Member of the House of Representatives
- In office 21 October 1996 – 16 November 2012
- Preceded by: Constituency established
- Succeeded by: Multi-member district
- Constituency: Kinki PR
- In office 19 February 1990 – 18 June 1993
- Preceded by: Takashi Ōya
- Succeeded by: Takashi Ōya
- Constituency: Osaka 1st

Member of the Osaka City Council
- In office 1975–1986
- Constituency: Nishinari Ward

Personal details
- Born: 11 November 1944 (age 81) Nishinari, Osaka, Japan
- Party: Liberal Democratic
- Relatives: Akira Yanagimoto (nephew)
- Education: Waseda University

Takuji Yanagimoto (柳本 卓治, Yanagimoto Takuji; born 11 November 1944) is a Japanese politician of the Liberal Democratic Party (LDP), a member of the House of Representatives and the House of Councillors in the Diet (national legislature).

== Early life ==
A native of Osaka, Osaka, Yanagimoto attended Waseda University as a graduate student.

== Political career ==
He was elected to the first of his three terms in the city assembly of Osaka in 1975. After running unsuccessfully for the House of Representatives in 1986 as an independent, he ran again in 1990 as a member of the LDP and was elected for the first time.
