= Takashi Tanihata =

Japanese politician

- 谷畑 孝
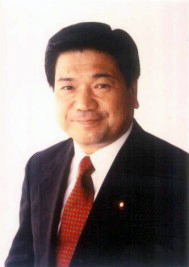
- Official portrait, 2003

Member of the House of Representatives; from Kinki
- In office 21 October 1996 – 2 April 2020
- Preceded by: Constituency established
- Succeeded by: Teruo Minobe
- Constituency: See list: PR block (1996–2000); Osaka 14th (2000–2009); PR block (2009–2012); Osaka 14th (2012–2017); PR block (2017–2020)

Member of the House of Councillors
- In office 23 July 1989 – 22 July 1995
- Preceded by: Kazutaka Tsuboi
- Succeeded by: Shuzen Tanigawa
- Constituency: Osaka at-large

Personal details
- Born: 10 January 1947 (age 79) Ikeda, Osaka, Japan
- Party: Ishin; One Osaka
- Other political affiliations: JSP (before 1996); LDP (1996–2012); JRP (2012–2014); JIP (2014–2016)
- Education: Kansai University

Takashi Tanihata (谷畑 孝, Tanihata Takashi; born 10 January 1947) is a former Japanese politician who served in the House of Councillors and the House of Representatives in the Diet (national legislature) as a member of the Initiatives from Osaka party. A native of Osaka Prefecture and graduate of Kansai University he was elected for the first time in 1989 after an unsuccessful run in 1986.
