= Hitoshi Asada =

Japanese politician (born 1950)

- 浅田 均
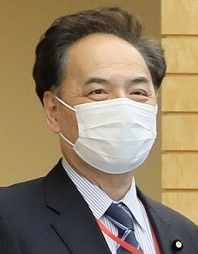
- Asada in 2020

Member of the House of Councillors
- Incumbent
- Assumed office 26 July 2016
- Preceded by: Motoyuki Odachi
- Constituency: Osaka at-large

Speaker of the Osaka Prefectural Assembly
- In office May 2011 – May 2014

Member of the Osaka Prefectural Assembly
- In office 1999 – June 2016
- Constituency: Jōtō Ward

Personal details
- Born: 29 December 1950 (age 75) Jōtō, Osaka, Japan
- Party: Innovation (since 2016)
- Other political affiliations: LDP (1999–2010); ORA (2010–2012); JRP (2012–2014); JIP (2014–2016)
- Education: Kyoto University; Stanford University

Hitoshi Asada (born December 29, 1950, in Osaka Prefecture, Japan) is a Japanese politician who has served as a member of the House of Councillors of Japan since 2016. He represents the Osaka at-large district and is a member of the Japan Innovation Party.
