= Hidekatsu Yoshii =

Japanese politician

- 吉井 英勝

Member of the House of Representatives
- In office 18 February 1990 – 16 November 2012
- Preceded by: Yukio Kyōzuka
- Succeeded by: Multi-member district
- Constituency: Osaka 4th (1990–1996); Kyushu PR (1996–2000); Kinki PR (2000–2012)

Member of the House of Councillors
- In office 28 February 1988 – 22 July 1989
- Preceded by: Fujio Tashiro
- Succeeded by: Kazuyoshi Shirahama
- Constituency: Osaka at-large

Personal details
- Born: 19 December 1942 (age 83) Kyoto, Japan
- Party: Communist
- Education: Kyoto University
- Website: 441-h.com

Hidekatsu Yoshii (吉井 英勝, Yoshii Hidekatsu; born 19 December 1942) is a Japanese politician and member of the House of Representatives for Japanese Communist Party.

A native of Kyoto, and graduate of Kyoto University, he was elected to the first of his three terms in the city assembly of Sakai, Osaka in 1971 and then to his one term in the assembly of Osaka Prefecture in 1983. After running unsuccessfully for the House of Councillors in 1986, he was elected to the house in 1988 but lost his seat in the following year. In 1990 he was elected to the House of Representatives for the first time.
