= Keiji Nishikawa =

Japanese shogi player (1961–2022)

- Native name: 西川慶二
- Born: December 6, 1961
- Hometown: Shinagawa, Tokyo, Japan
- Died: January 17, 2022 (aged 60)

Career
- Achieved professional status: November 3, 1981 (aged 19)
- Badge Number: 151
- Rank: 8-dan
- Retired: June 30, 2021 (aged 59)
- Teacher: Shōzō Kashū (7-dan)
- Meijin class: free
- Ryūō class: 6
- Notable students: Kazuhiro Nishikawa

Websites
- JSA profile page

Keiji Nishikawa (西川 慶二, Nishikawa Keiji; December 6, 1961 – January 17, 2022) was a Japanese professional shogi player who achieved the rank of 8-dan. He was a former director of the Japan Shogi Association, and his son Kazuhiro is also a professional shogi player.

== Shogi professional ==
Nishikawa finished the 73rd Meijin Class C2 league (April 2014 – March 2015) with a record of 1 win and 9 losses, earning a third demotion point which meant automatic demotion to "Free Class" play.

He submitted his retirement papers to the JSA on June 30, 2021. He had been on an official leave of absence since the end of 2018 due to health problems.

=== Promotion history ===
The promotion history for Nishikawa was as follows:

- 5-kyū: 1975
- 1-dan: 1978
- 4-dan: November 3, 1981
- 5-dan: April 1, 1984
- 6-dan: May 27, 1988
- 7-dan: September 24, 1997
- 8-dan: April 1, 2018
- Retired: June 30, 2021

== JSA director ==
Nishikawa served on the Japan Shogi Association's board of directors as a director from 2007 to 2011.

== Personal life and death ==
Nishikawa and his son Kazuhiro were the sixth father-son pair to become professional shogi players and the only pair since the end of World War II. He died on January 17, 2022, at the age of 60.
