= Knock Yokoyama =

Japanese politician and comedian

- 横山 ノック

Governor of Osaka Prefecture
- In office 23 April 1995 – 22 December 1999
- Monarch: Akihito
- Preceded by: Kazuo Nakagawa
- Succeeded by: Fusae Ohta

Member of the House of Councillors
- In office 11 July 1977 – 25 March 1995
- Preceded by: Multi-member district
- Succeeded by: Yoshiki Yamashita
- Constituency: National district (1977–1983); Osaka at-large (1983–1995)
- In office 8 July 1968 – 7 July 1974
- Constituency: National district

Personal details
- Born: 山田 勇 (Yamada Isamu); 30 January 1932 Asahikawa, Hokkaido, Japan
- Died: 3 May 2007 (aged 75) Nishinomiya, Hyōgo, Japan
- Party: Liberal Democratic
- Occupation: Politician, comedian

Knock Yokoyama (横山 ノック, Yokoyama Nokku; 30 January 1932 – 3 May 2007) was a Japanese politician and comedian.

Born Isamu Yamada (山田勇 Yamada Isamu) in Asahikawa (Hokkaido), he adopted his current stage name while directing the Manga Trio manzai troupe from 1959 to 1968. Following his comedy years, he went into the construction industry and served as a director at several major construction firms in the Kansai region.

He became governor of Osaka Prefecture in 1995, running as an independent and joining the Liberal Democratic Party (LDP) after his election. He enjoyed great popularity as governor, mostly due to his existing fame as a comedian.

In 2000, a 21-year-old campaign volunteer accused Yokoyama of sexual harassment, claiming that the governor groped her for 30 minutes in the back of a campaign truck. Yokoyama denied the charges, but the Osaka District Court found him liable for ¥11 million in damages, following a highly publicized trial in which the plaintiff testified from behind an opaque screen to avoid revealing her identity. Following the judgment, Yokoyama resigned: he was replaced by a female LDP bureaucrat, Fusae Ohta.

Preceded by Kazuo Nakagawa	Governor of Osaka Prefecture; April 1995 – December 1999	Succeeded by Fusae Ohta
