= Chisato Miyade =

Japanese politician (born 1985)

- 宮出 千慧
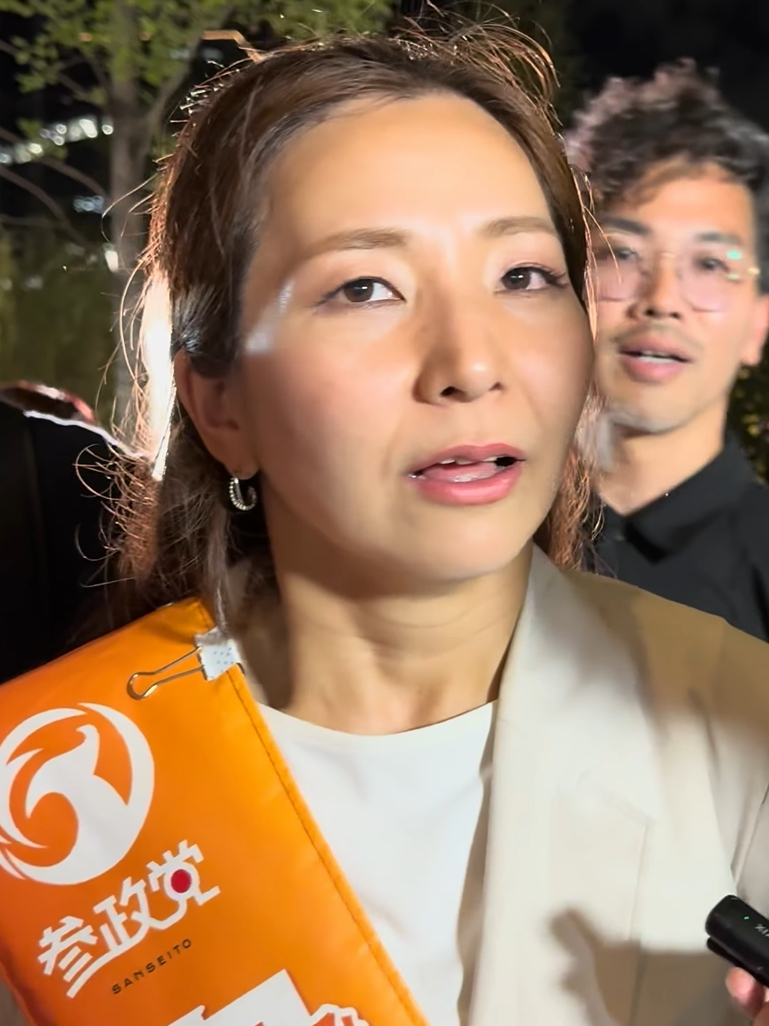
- Miyade in 2025

Member of the House of Councillors
- Incumbent
- Assumed office 29 July 2025
- Preceded by: Fusae Ohta
- Constituency: Osaka at-large

Personal details
- Born: 15 March 1985 (age 41) Kawachinagano, Osaka, Japan
- Party: Sanseitō

Chisato Miyade (宮出千慧, Miyade Chisato; born 15 March 1985) is a Japanese politician serving as a member of the House of Councillors since 2025. In the 2024 general election, she was a candidate for the House of Representatives.
