= Kazuhiro Nishikawa =

Japanese shogi player

- Native name: 西川和宏
- Born: April 2, 1986 (age 40)
- Hometown: Kobe, Japan

Career
- Achieved professional status: October 1, 2008 (aged 22)
- Badge number: 272
- Rank: 7-dan
- Teacher: Keiji Nishikawa (8-dan)
- Meijin class: C2
- Ryūō class: 4

Websites
- JSA profile page

Kazuhiro Nishikawa (西川 和宏, Nishikawa Kazuhiro; born April 2, 1986) is a Japanese professional shogi player ranked 7-dan.

== Early life and apprenticeship ==
Nishikawa was born on April 2, 1986, in Kobe, Japan. Although his father Keiji was a professional shogi player, he only really became interested in shogi when he was a first grade elementary school student after reading a beginner's book written by shogi professional Yasuo Harada. Nishikawa was accepted into the Japan Shogi Association's apprentice school at the rank of 6-kyū as a student of his father in 2001, promoted to the rank of 1-dan in 1995, and obtained full professional status and the rank of 4-dan in October 2008 after finishing the 43rd 3-dan League (April 2008 – September 2008) with a record of 14 wins and 4 losses.

== Shogi professional ==
=== Promotion history ===
The promotion history for Nishikawa is as follows:

- 6-kyū: September 2001
- 4-dan: October 1, 2008
- 5-dan: August 21, 2014
- 6-dan: November 10, 2016
- 7-dan: September 15, 2026

== Personal life ==
Nishikawa and his father are the sixth father-son pair to become professional shogi players and the only pair since the end of World War II.
