= Issei Kitagawa =

Japanese politician (1942–2021)

- 北川 イッセイ
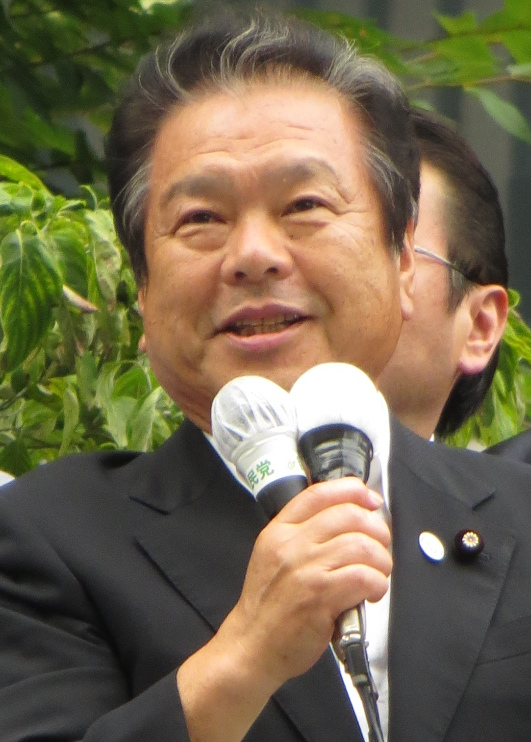
- Kitagawa in 2013

Member of the House of Councillors
- In office 26 July 2004 – 25 July 2016
- Preceded by: Kiyoshi Nishikawa
- Succeeded by: Rui Matsukawa
- Constituency: Osaka at-large

Member of the Osaka Prefectural Assembly
- In office 1991–2004
- Constituency: Higashiōsaka City

Personal details
- Born: 1 December 1942 Higashiōsaka, Osaka, Japan
- Died: 7 September 2021 (aged 78)
- Party: Liberal Democratic
- Education: Kansai University

Issei Kitagawa (北川 一成, Kitagawa Issei; December 1, 1942 in Higashiōsaka – September 7, 2021) was a Japanese politician of the Liberal Democratic Party, a member of the House of Councillors in the Diet (national legislature). A graduate of Kansai University, he was elected to the House of Councillors for the first time in 2004 after serving in the assembly of Osaka Prefecture for four terms.
