= Rui Matsukawa =

Japanese politician

- 松川 るい
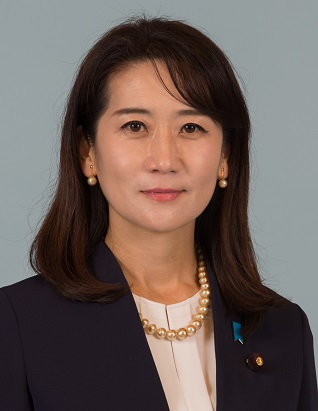
- Official portrait, 2020

Member of the House of Councillors
- Incumbent
- Assumed office 26 July 2016
- Preceded by: Issei Kitagawa
- Constituency: Osaka at-large

Personal details
- Born: 26 February 1971 (age 55) Ōita Prefecture, Japan
- Party: Liberal Democratic
- Spouse: Yusuke Arai
- Children: 2
- Education: University of Tokyo; Georgetown University

Rui Arai (新居 るい, Arai Rui, née Matsukawa, 松川; February 26, 1971) is a Japanese politician and diplomat who serves as a member of the House of Councillors representing the Liberal Democratic Party. She previously served as Parliamentary Vice-Minister of Defense and Parliamentary Vice-Minister of Cabinet Office. She is the wife of diplomat Yūsuke Arai.

== Early life and education ==
Matsukawa was born in Ōita Prefecture, and raised in Osaka Prefecture. After graduating from Shitennoji Junior and Senior High School, she studied law at the University of Tokyo. She earned a master's degree in international relations from Georgetown University in 1997.

== Career ==
=== Diplomatic career ===
Matsukawa entered the Ministry of Foreign Affairs in 1993, after graduating from university. She was appointed assistant director of the Legal Affairs Division in the Treaty Bureau, Ministry of Foreign Affairs in 1999. In 2002, she became assistant director of the Regional Policy Division in the Asia and Pacific Bureau.

At the Ministry of Foreign Affairs, she was involved in diplomatic negotiations with ASEAN countries, including the International Space Station, ASEAN Cooperation and Trilateral Cooperation Secretariat, the International Tribunal for the Southern Bluefin Tuna, etc. From 2004, as First Secretary of the Permanent Mission of Japan to the Conference on Disarmament, she worked on international situation analysis in the Nuclear Disarmament Intelligence Division.

After serving as Chief Secretary of the Intelligence and Analysis Service, Ministry of Foreign Affairs, she was appointed as Deputy Director General under Director General Shin Bong-gil at the Trilateral Cooperation Secretariat in Seoul in 2011, where she served until 2013.

=== Political career ===
Matsukawa was selected in the open call for candidates for the 24th ordinary election for the House of Councillors conducted by the Osaka Branch Federation of the Liberal Democratic Party in 2016. She was elected for the first time as the top vote-getter in the Osaka electoral district.

She was re-elected to the House of Councillors in July 2022.

== Controversies ==
=== Comment on elderly Japanese people ===
On March 2, 2020, Matsukawa caused disorder during a questioning of the House of Councillors Budget Committee (regarding the countermeasures against the COVID-19 pandemic), when she fielded the comment: "Elderly Japanese people don't walk, so they are fine." Renhō, a member of the Constitutional Democratic Party, who asking the question as she said: "I am surprised that such a statement came from a member of the ruling party." Afterwards, Matsukawa explained to the press that "Elderly people in facilities typically have their comings and goings properly controlled," and also said that "I regret the misleading expression. If anyone was offended, I apologize."

=== Banned from the Russian invasion of Ukraine ===
In May 2022, Matsukawa permanently banned from entering Russia as a result of Russian government's retaliatory measures against Japan following the Russian invasion of Ukraine.

=== Training program in France ===
In July 2023, the Liberal Democratic Party's Women's Bureau took 38 participants to France for an overseas training program. Matsukawa, the Bureau Director, posted a photo on social media of herself posing with Eriko Imai and other participants with the Eiffel Tower in the background. The photo was met with numerous critical comments such as, "Is this a blood-tax-funded trip?" After receiving criticism, Matsukawa deleted the photo and apologized on social media. She explained that the expenses were "party funds and each participant's own expenses," but this drew further criticism, saying, "The income of a legislator is taxpayers' money." On August 1, Hiroshige Sekō, Secretary General of the House of Councillors of the Liberal Democratic Party, stated that "it was thoughtless of her to upload photos on social media that could be mistaken for tourism," and said that he had given Matsukawa a stern warning. On the other hand, Matsukawa herself said, "The training itself was meaningful. I was able to hear in detail about the process and results of the compulsory early childhood education from the age of three in France, and had a meaningful exchange of opinions with people from the Senate and the National Assembly about women's activities in politics."

== Personal life ==
Matsukawa's family includes her husband Yusuke Arai and two daughters.
