= Akira Nishino (politician) =

Japanese politician (born 1940)

- 西野 陽
- Official portrait, 2005

Member of the House of Representatives
- In office 20 October 1996 – 16 November 2012
- Preceded by: Constituency established
- Succeeded by: Kōichi Nishino
- Constituency: Osaka 13th (1996–2000); Kinki PR (2000–2003); Osaka 13th (2003–2012)

Speaker of the Osaka Prefectural Assembly
- In office June 1987 – June 1988

Member of the Osaka Prefectural Assembly
- In office 1975–1993
- Constituency: Higashiōsaka City

Personal details
- Born: 15 January 1940 (age 86) Higashiōsaka, Osaka, Japan
- Party: Independent (since 2012)
- Other political affiliations: NFP (1994–1998); LP (1998–2000); NCP (2000); LDP (2000–2012)
- Children: Kōichi Nishino
- Education: Kansai University

Akira Nishino (西野 陽, Nishino Akira; born 15 January 1940) is a retired Japanese politician of the Liberal Democratic Party (LDP), who served as a member of the House of Representatives in the Diet (national legislature). A native of Higashiōsaka, Osaka and graduate of Kansai University he was elected to the assembly of Osaka Prefecture for the first time in 1975. In 1993 he unsuccessfully ran for the House of Representatives as a member of the LDP. He ran again in 1996, this time as a member of the now-defunct New Frontier Party, and was elected for the first time. He later joined the LDP.
