= Helen Nishikawa =

Japanese TV presenter and actress

Helen Nishikawa (Japanese: 西川 ヘレン, Hepburn: Nishikawa Heren) [born Helen Sugimoto (杉本 ヘレン, Sugimoto Heren); 6 October 1946] is a female Japanese TV presenter and actress. Although one of her parents was American, Nishikawa does not speak native-level English.

She is well known as the wife of the comedian and former politician Kiyoshi Nishikawa and has written two books.

== Early life and career ==
Helen Sugimoto was born in Kyoto on 6 October 1946 but did not reveal who her father was. After her marriage, she acknowledged that her first name was derived from Helen Keller, a person her father admired. In Japan single-parent women generally have a lower social status, as did entertainers and as an American Japanese shortly after World War II, Sugimoto suffered much bullying in her early age.

Sugimoto made her stage debut as a dancer in Yoshimoto Kogyo in 1963. Her purity and eagerness was loved by audiences and she immediately became one of the leading actresses in Yoshimoto New Comedy.

== Kiyoshi Nishikawa ==
Sugimoto, already a star, married a lowly actor in the Yoshimoto Kogyo theatre company called Kiyoshi Nishikawa who went on to become the most successful entertainer of the manzai and owarai styles (traditional Japanese stand-up comedy involving two performers) in the 1970s and 1980s. In his earlier days, Helen took care of him and his co-starring comedian, Yasushi Yokoyama.

Helen's support of her husband brought the couple glittering success and assisted in Kiyoshi's rise within Japanese national politics as an independent member of the Upper House of Councillors in the Japanese Diet, where he served for 18 years.

In a recent poll, the couple were considered to be who the Japanese consider to be the second best role models of an "international couple". Their lives were dramatised in a 2006 series made by the national Nihon Television company.

== Personal life ==
Nishikawa has two sons, Tadashi and Hiroshi and a daughter Kanoko.

== TV presenter ==
She still acts or presents on Japanese TV programs mainly oriented for housewives or older women.
