= Kiyoshi Nishikawa =

Japanese politician

- 西川 きよし
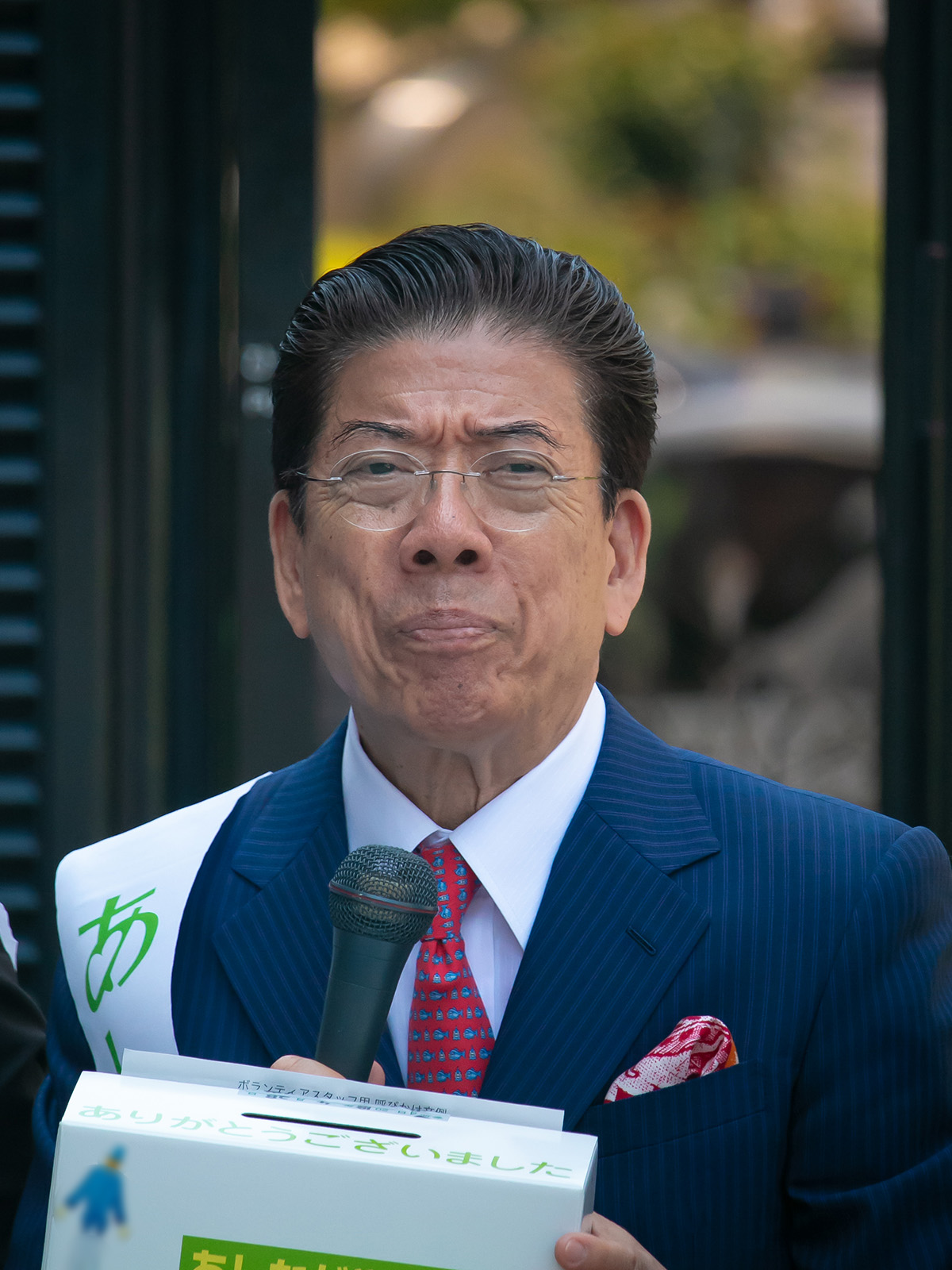
- Nishikawa in 2018

Member of the House of Councillors
- In office 8 July 1986 – 25 July 2004
- Preceded by: Taro Nakayama
- Succeeded by: Issei Kitagawa
- Constituency: Osaka at-large

Personal details
- Born: 西川 潔 2 July 1946 (age 80) Kōchi City, Kōchi, Japan
- Party: Dainiin Club
- Spouse: Helen Nishikawa (m. 1967)
- Occupation: Comedian, actor
- Same year/generation as: Kinichi Hagimoto; Danshi Tatekawa

Kiyoshi Nishikawa (西川きよし, Nishikawa Kiyoshi; born 2 July 1946) is a Japanese comedian, actor, and former politician.

== Comedy career ==
Nishikawa trained to be a comedian under Kin Ishii, and became a student at Yoshimoto Shinkigeki (a comedy troupe run by Yoshimoto Kogyo) in 1964. In 1966, he formed a manzai duo with Yasushi Yokoyama, and rose to fame, the pair eventually becoming one of the leaders of the manzai boom of the early 1980s. The pair won the Kamigata Manzai Grand Prize three times in 1970, 1977, and 1980.

== Political career ==
Nishikawa served in Japan's House of Councillors for three terms between 1986 and 2004 as an independent, representing the Osaka district. He came first all three times he stood for office, with more than one million votes. Nishikawa resumed his entertainment career after 2004.

== Personal life ==
Nishikawa's wife is Helen Nishikawa. They married in 1967 when she was a top actress in Yoshimoto Shinkigeki and he still an up-and-coming comedian.

== Filmography ==
=== Film ===
- The 47 Ronin in Debt (2019)

=== Television ===
- Massan (NHK, 2014–15)
- Warotenka (NHK, 2017–18)

== Honours ==
- Person of Cultural Merit (2020)
