= Fusae Ohta =

Japanese politician (born 1951)

Fusae Saitō
- 齊藤 房江
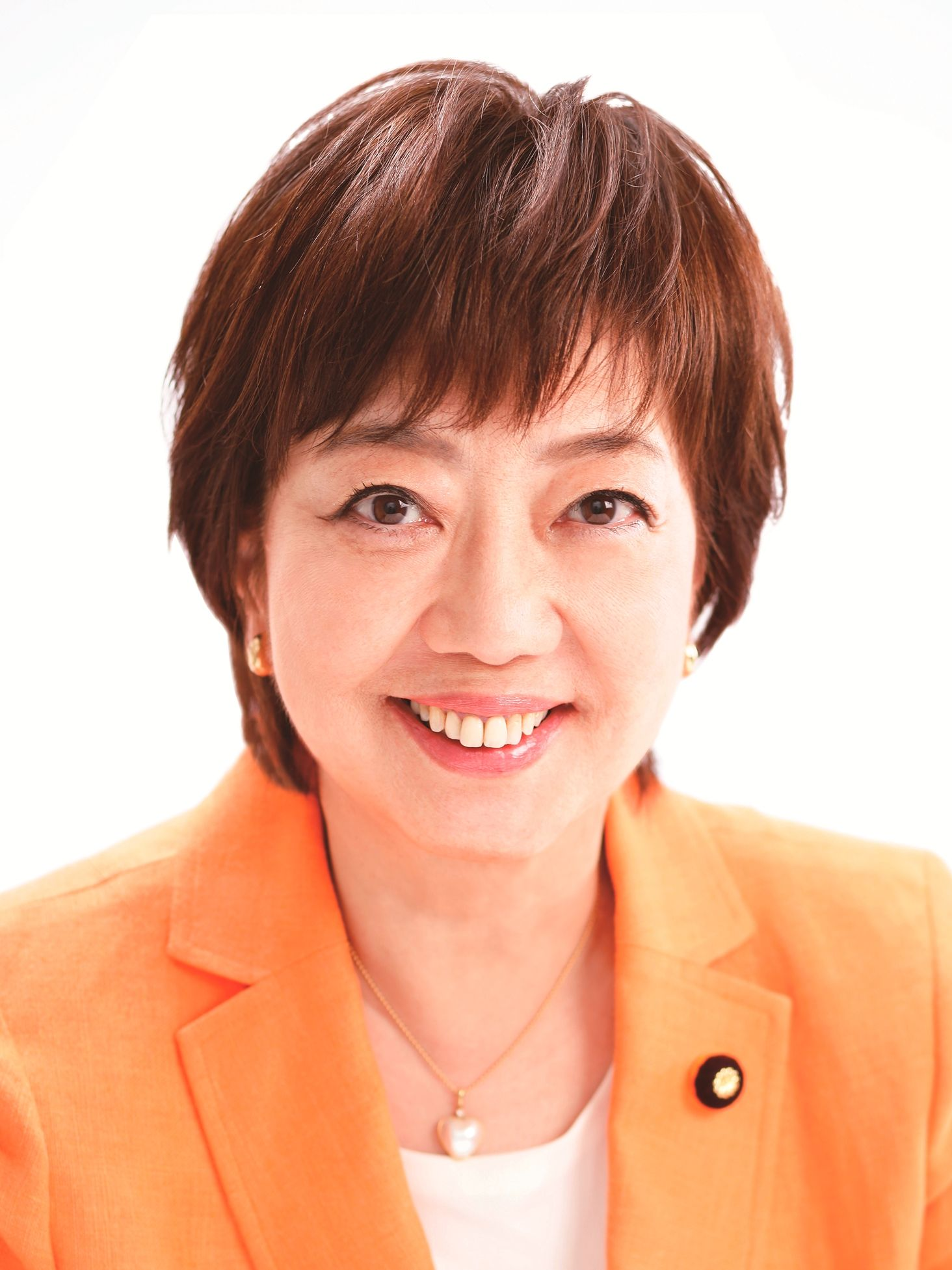
- Official portrait, 2014

Member of the House of Councillors
- In office 29 July 2013 – 28 July 2025
- Preceded by: Multi-member district
- Succeeded by: Chisato Miyade
- Constituency: National PR (2013–2019); Osaka at-large (2019–2025)

Governor of Osaka Prefecture
- In office 5 February 2000 – 4 February 2008
- Monarch: Akihito
- Preceded by: Knock Yokoyama
- Succeeded by: Tōru Hashimoto

Personal details
- Born: 26 June 1951 (age 75) Kure, Hiroshima, Japan
- Party: Liberal Democratic
- Education: University of Tokyo

Fusae Ōta (太田 房江, Ōta Fusae; born June 26, 1951) is a Japanese politician, a former governor of Osaka Prefecture, and the country's first female prefectural governor. Her married name is Fusae Saitō (齊藤 房江, Saitō Fusae). She is affiliated to the revisionist lobby Nippon Kaigi.

== Career ==
Born in Kure, Hiroshima, she later moved to Toyohashi, Aichi.

After graduating from the University of Tokyo with an economics degree in 1976, Ohta entered the Ministry of International Trade and Industry. She served in MITI until 1997, when she became vice-governor of Okayama Prefecture. She returned to the ministry in 1999.

Ohta became governor of Osaka prefecture after the resignation of Knock Yokoyama in 2000. She was re-elected in 2004, and after eight years in office was succeeded by lawyer and TV personality Tōru Hashimoto.

Osaka hosts the March sumo tournament, one of Japan's six major tournaments, and the governor of each prefecture presents the "Governor's Prize" to the champion of each tournament. Given the Sumo Association's view that there is a traditional ban on women entering the dohyō (ring), and the ring would be "violated" by an "unclean" woman entering it, she was required to do so on the walkway beside the ring or send a male representative in her place. She repeatedly challenged the Sumo Association's policy by requesting to be allowed to fulfill her traditional role as governor. Her requests were repeatedly rejected until she stepped down from office.

Ohta's family name has been officially registered as Saitō (齊藤) since her marriage, but she uses her maiden name above for most public purposes.

Ohta's family name is romanized as Ohta by the URL of her website (ohtafusae.jp), the state government of Hawaii, the United Nations Economic and Social Commission for Asia and the Pacific, Kansai Window, and Dawn Center. The name is romanized as Ota by WebJapan, the Japan Times and the BBC.

Preceded by Knock Yokoyama	Governor of Osaka Prefecture; February 2000 – February 2008	Succeeded by Tōru Hashimoto
