= Motoyuki Odachi =

Japanese politician

- 尾立 源幸
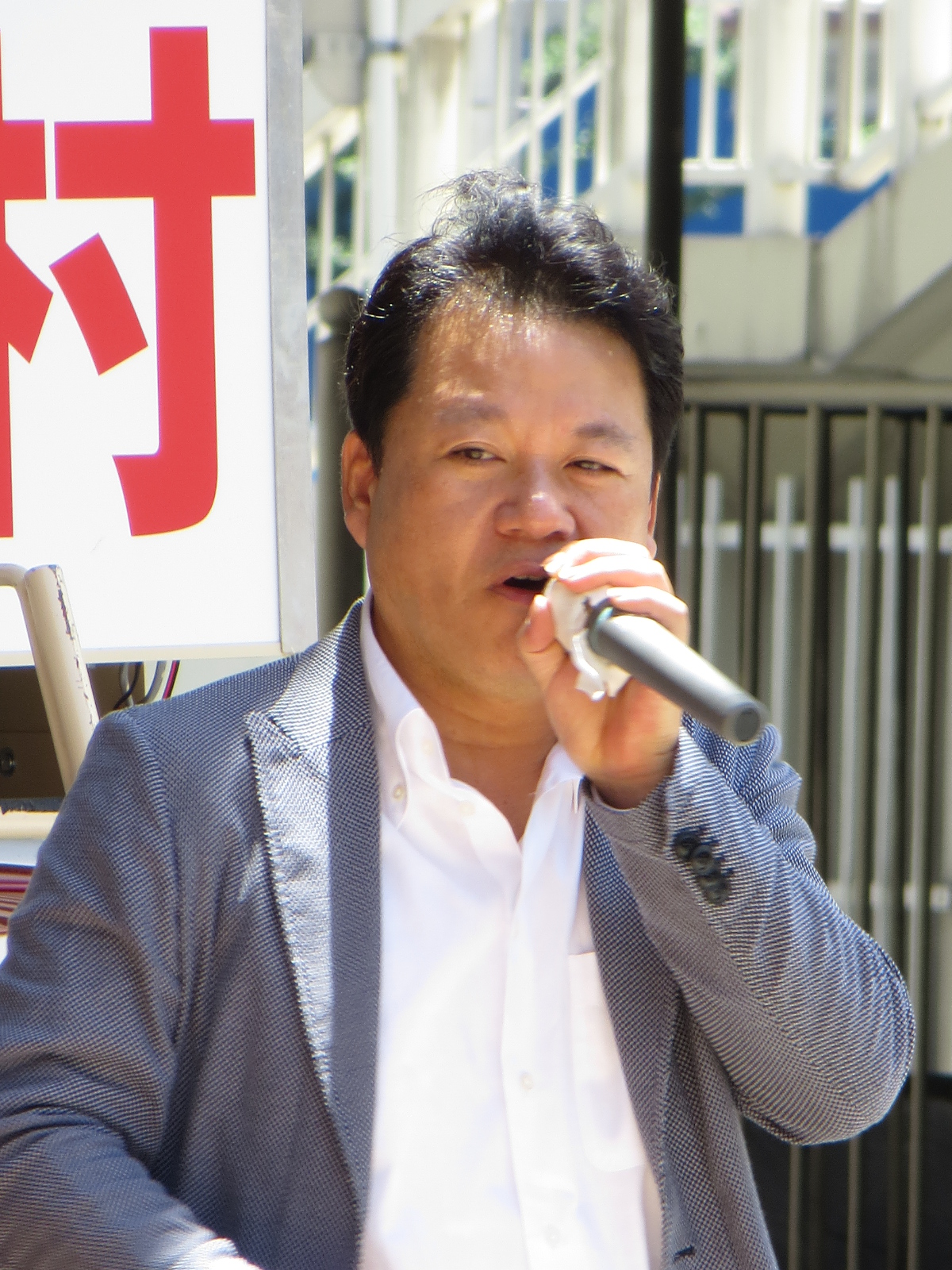
- Odachi in 2013

Member of the House of Councillors
- In office 26 July 2004 – 25 July 2016
- Preceded by: Takeshi Miyamoto
- Succeeded by: Hitoshi Asada
- Constituency: Osaka at-large

Personal details
- Born: 9 October 1963 (age 62) Kyoto Prefecture, Japan
- Party: LDP (since 2018)
- Other political affiliations: DPJ (2000–2016); DP (2016); Independent (2016–2018)
- Education: Keio University

Motoyuki Odachi (尾立 源幸, Odachi Motoyuki; born October 9, 1963) is a former Japanese politician of the Liberal Democratic Party, who served as a member of the House of Councillors in the Diet (national legislature). A native of Sakai, Osaka and graduate of Keio University, he was elected to the House of Councillors for the first time in 2004 after running unsuccessfully for the House of Representatives in 2000.
