= Mizuho Umemura =

Japanese politician (born 1978)

- 梅村 みずほ
- Umemura in 2026

Member of the House of Councillors
- Incumbent
- Assumed office 29 July 2019
- Preceded by: Kotaro Tatsumi
- Constituency: Osaka at-large (2019–2025); National PR (2025–present)

Personal details
- Born: 10 September 1978 (age 48) Nagoya, Aichi, Japan
- Party: Sanseitō (since 2025)
- Other political affiliations: Innovation (2019–2025)
- Children: 2
- Education: Ritsumeikan University

Mizuho Umemura (born 10 September 1978) is a Japanese politician who has served as a member of the House of Councillors of Japan since 2019. Until 2025 she represented the Osaka district and was a member of the Nippon Ishin no Kai (Japan Innovation Party).

Umemura stated that she is a shukyo nisei, since her mother has been psychologically manipulated by a cult that was part of the Jehovah's Witnesses.

On May 12, 2023, Umemura faced intense scrutiny over her statement about the death of Wishma Sandamali in a Nagoya detention facility in 2021 during the deliberation about the revision of the Immigration Control and Refugee Recognition Act. She remarked that "Wishma, as possibly told by the foreigner assisting group, might have a faint hope of parole [from deportation], should she fake her illness via hunger strike". That statement was immediately criticized by other members in the committee as "untrue" and "absurd". On May 18, 2023, Ishin Secretary-General Fumitake Fujita announced that Umemura was dismissed from her upper house judicial affairs committee assignment for her problematic remarks. Subsequently her Ishin party membership was suspended for 6 months effective from May 26, 2023.

On June 28, 2025, she joined Sanseitō.
