= Hisatake Sugi =

Japanese politician

- 杉 久武
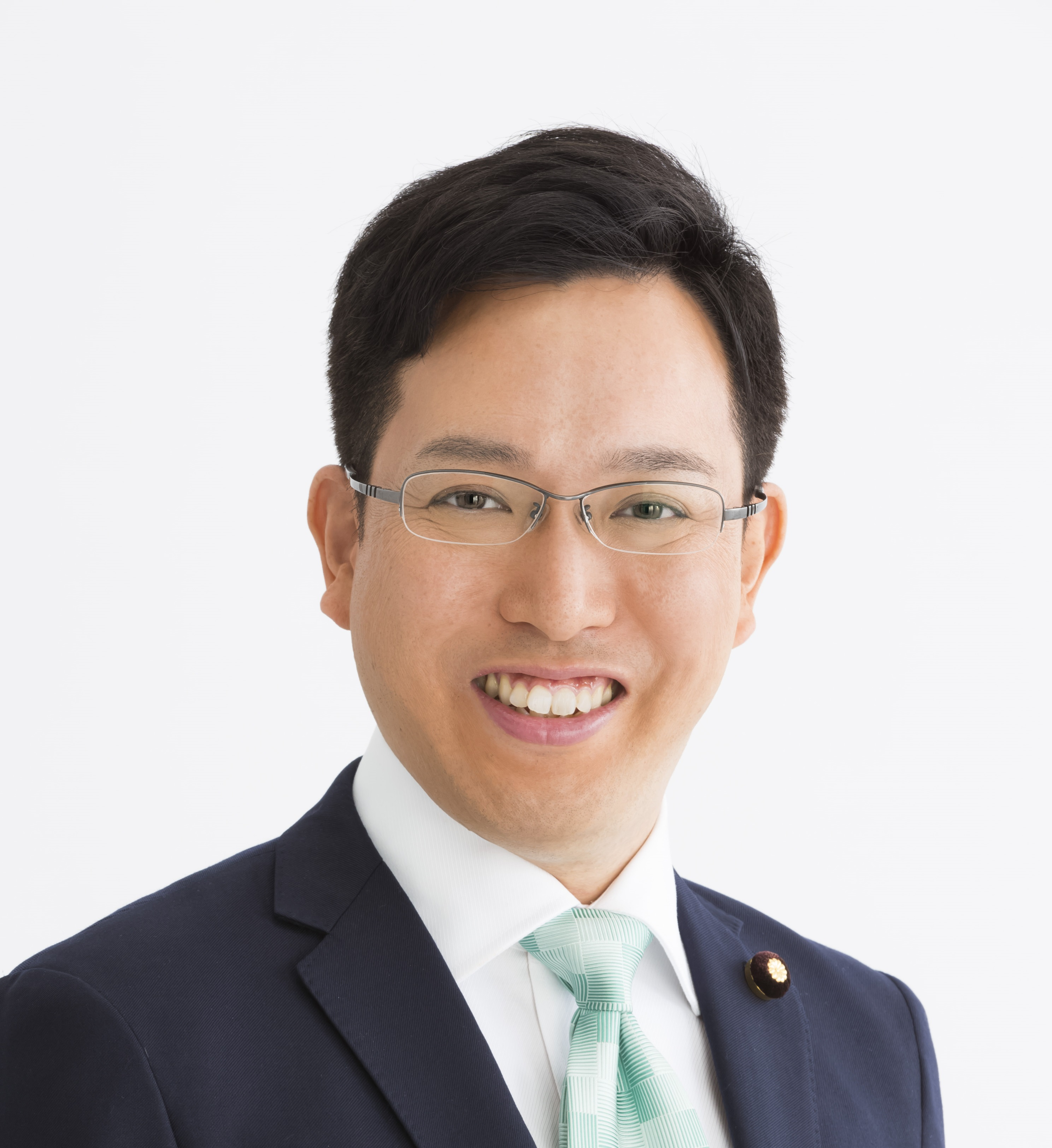
- Official portrait, 2018

Member of the House of Councillors
- Incumbent
- Assumed office 29 July 2013
- Preceded by: Kazuyoshi Shirahama
- Constituency: Osaka at-large

Personal details
- Born: 4 January 1976 (age 50) Nishinari, Osaka, Japan
- Party: Komeito
- Education: Sōka University

Hisatake Sugi (born 4 January 1976) is a Japanese politician and a member of the House of Councillors of Japan.

== Career ==
In 1998, he graduated from Sōka University. He worked as a Certified Public Accountant and in 2006, worked for Price WaterhouseCoopers.
