= Kyoto Women's University =

Private women's college in Higashiyama-ku, Kyoto, Kyoto, Japan

Coordinates: 34°59′17″N 135°46′48″E

- 京都女子大学
- Motto: 建学の精神
- Type: Private
- Established: 1899
- Affiliations: Jodo Shinshu Hongwanji-ha
- Location: Kyoto, Japan
- Language: Japanese
- Mascot: Fujino chan
- Website: www.kyoto-wu.ac.jp

Kyoto Women's University (京都女子大学, Kyōto joshi daigaku) is a private women's college in Higashiyama-ku, Kyoto, Kyoto, Japan. The school's predecessor was founded in 1899, and it was chartered as a university in 1949.

The school's nickname is 京女(kyojo).
