= Shigeki Sato (politician) =

Japanese politician

- 佐藤 茂樹
- Official portrait, 2013

Member of the House of Representatives
- In office 23 June 2003 – 9 October 2024
- Preceded by: Multi-member district
- Succeeded by: Tōru Azuma
- Constituency: Kinki PR (2003–2012); Osaka 3rd (2012–2024)
- In office 18 July 1993 – 2 June 2000
- Preceded by: Hidehiko Yaoi
- Succeeded by: Multi-member district
- Constituency: Osaka 6th (1993–1996); Kinki PR (1996–2000)

Personal details
- Born: 8 June 1959 (age 67) Ōtsu, Shiga, Japan
- Party: Komeito
- Other political affiliations: CGP (1993–1994); NFP (1994–1998); LP (1998–2003)
- Children: 2
- Education: Kyoto University

Shigeki Sato (佐藤 茂樹, Satō Shigeki; born 8 June 1959) is a Japanese politician who served in the House of Representatives as a member of the Komeito Party. A native of Ōtsu, Shiga and graduate of Kyoto University, he was elected for the first time in 1993.
