= Hirotaka Ishikawa =

Japanese politician

- 石川 博崇
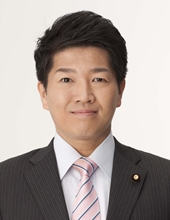

Member of the House of Councillors
- Incumbent
- Assumed office 26 July 2010
- Preceded by: Eiichi Yamashita
- Constituency: Osaka at-large

Personal details
- Born: 12 September 1973 (age 52) Toyonaka, Osaka, Japan
- Party: Komeito
- Relatives: Hisashi Kazama (father-in-law)
- Education: Sōka University

Hirotaka Ishikawa (born September 12, 1973, in Osaka Prefecture) is a Japanese politician who has served as a member of the House of Councillors of Japan since 2010. He represents the Osaka at-large district and is a member of the Komeito party.
