= Osaka at-large district =

Japan House of Councillors constituency

- 大阪府選挙区
- Parliamentary constituency for the House of Councillors
- Prefecture: Osaka
- Electorate: 7,322,198 (as of September 2022)

Current constituency
- Created: 1947
- Seats: 8
- Councillors: Class of 2022: Kaori Takagi; Rui Matsukawa; Hitoshi Asada; Hirotaka Ishikawa; Class of 2025: Sasaki Rie; Futoshi Okazaki; Hisatake Sugi; Chisato Miyade

The Osaka at-large district (Japanese: 大阪府選挙区, Hepburn: Ōsaka-ken senkyoku) is a constituency of the House of Councillors that elects Councillors to represent Osaka Prefecture in the National Diet of Japan. From 1947 the district has elected three Councillors every three years by single non-transferable vote for six-year terms, such that there are six Councillors representing the district in the 242-member house. A revision to the Public Officers Electoral Law in 2012 increased the district's representation so that four Councillors were elected at the July 2013 election which will give the district a total eight Councillors by 2019.

The district has 7,140,578 registered voters (as of September 2015), making it the third-largest district behind the Tokyo and Kanagawa districts. The current Councillors for the district are:

== Elected Councillors ==
class of 1947				election year	class of 1950			
–	Tetsuo Iwaki (Democratic)	Masakazu Morishita (Socialist Party) (Note: Resigned 31 March 1951.)	Mitsuji Nakai (Democratic)	1947	Gisen Sato (JLP)	Shinzo Ōya (JLP)	Shigeo Murao (Japan Socialist)	–
–	Tetsuo Iwaki (Democratic)	Masakazu Morishita (Socialist Party)	Mitsuji Nakai (Democratic)	1950	Gisen Sato (Liberal)	Shinzo Ōya (Liberal)	Shigeo Murao (Japan Socialist)	–
–	Fukuzo Nakayama (Ryokufūkai)	Masakazu Morishita (Socialist Party)	Haruji Mizobuchi (Liberal)	1951 by-el. (Note: Held 16 May 1951.)	Gisen Sato (Liberal)	Shinzo Ōya (Liberal)	Shigeo Murao (Japan Socialist)	–
–	Fukuzo Nakayama (Ryokufūkai)	Masakazu Morishita (Right Socialist) (Note: Died in office 5 March 1957.)	Tokuji Kameda (Left Socialist)	1953	Gisen Sato (Liberal)	Shinzo Ōya (Liberal)	Shigeo Murao (Japan Socialist)	–
–	Fukuzo Nakayama (Ryokufūkai)	Masakazu Morishita (Right Socialist)	Tokuji Kameda (Left Socialist)	1956	Gisen Sato (LDP) (Note: Resigned 29 March 1959.)	Shigeo Tsubaki (Japan Socialist)	Giichiro Shiraki (Ind.)	–
–	Fukuzo Nakayama (Ryokufūkai)	Mitsuzo Ōkawa (LDP) (Note: Resigned on 5 April 1959 to contest the vacancy caused by the resignation of Gisen Sato)	Tokuji Kameda (Left Socialist)	1957 by-el. (Note: Held 23 April 1957.)	Gisen Sato (LDP)	Shigeo Tsubaki (Japan Socialist)	Giichiro Shiraki (Ind.)	–
–	Fukuzo Nakayama (Ryokufūkai)	Vacant (Note: Vacancy caused by Ohkawa's resignation on 5 April 1959 to contest the vacancy caused by the resignation of Gisen Sato)	Tokuji Kameda (Left Socialist)	1959 by-el. (Note: Held 30 April 1959.)	Mitsuzo Ōkawa (LDP)	Shigeo Tsubaki (Japan Socialist)	Giichiro Shiraki (Ind.)	–
–	Bunzo Akama (LDP) (Note: Died in office 2 May 1973.)	Shigeo Murao (Socialist)	Tokuji Kameda (Socialist)	1959	Mitsuzo Ōkawa (LDP)	Shigeo Tsubaki (Japan Socialist)	Giichiro Shiraki (Ind.)	–
–	Bunzo Akama (LDP)	Shigeo Murao (Socialist)	Tokuji Kameda (Socialist)	1962	Fukuzo Nakayama (LDP)	Shigeo Tsubaki (Japan Socialist)	Giichiro Shiraki (Ind.)	–
–	Bunzo Akama (LDP)	Fujio Tashiro (Komeito) (Note: Resigned 25 January 1988.)	Tokuji Kameda (Socialist)	1965	Fukuzo Nakayama (LDP)	Shigeo Tsubaki (Japan Socialist)	Giichiro Shiraki (Ind.)	–
–	Bunzo Akama (LDP)	Fujio Tashiro (Komeito)	Tokuji Kameda (Socialist)	1968	Taro Nakayama (LDP)	Shigeo Murao (Socialist Party)	Giichiro Shiraki (Komeito)	–
–	Bunzo Akama (LDP)	Fujio Tashiro (Komeito)	Shizuko Sasaki (Socialist)	1971	Taro Nakayama (LDP)	Shigeo Murao (Socialist Party)	Giichiro Shiraki (Komeito)	–
–	Takeko Kutsunugi (Communist)	Fujio Tashiro (Komeito)	Shizuko Sasaki (Socialist)	1973 by-el. (Note: Held 17 June 1973.)	Taro Nakayama (LDP)	Shigeo Murao (Socialist Party)	Giichiro Shiraki (Komeito)	–
–	Takeko Kutsunugi (Communist)	Fujio Tashiro (Komeito)	Shizuko Sasaki (Socialist)	1974	Taro Nakayama (LDP)	Atsushi Hashimoto (Communist)	Giichiro Shiraki (Komeito)	–
–	Takeko Kutsunugi (Communist)	Fujio Tashiro (Komeito)	Tai Morishita (LDP) (Note: Died in office 14 November 1987.)	1977	Taro Nakayama (LDP)	Atsushi Hashimoto (Communist)	Giichiro Shiraki (Komeito)	–
–	Takeko Kutsunugi (Communist)	Fujio Tashiro (Komeito)	Tai Morishita (LDP)	1980	Taro Nakayama (LDP)	Eiichi Nakamura (Ind.)	Giichiro Shiraki (Komeito)	–
–	Knock Yokoyama (Ind.)	Fujio Tashiro (Komeito)	Tai Morishita (LDP)	1983	Taro Nakayama (LDP)	Eiichi Nakamura (Ind.)	Giichiro Shiraki (Komeito)	–
–	Knock Yokoyama (Ind.)	Fujio Tashiro (Komeito)	Tai Morishita (LDP)	1986	Kiyoshi Nishikawa (Ind.)	Takeko Kutsunugi (Communist)	Akinori Mineyama (Komeito)	–
–	Knock Yokoyama (Ind.)	Fujio Tashiro (Komeito)	Kazutaka Tsuboi (LDP)	1987 by-el. (Note: Held 27 December 1987.)	Kiyoshi Nishikawa (Ind.)	Takeko Kutsunugi (Communist)	Akinori Mineyama (Komeito)	–
–	Knock Yokoyama (Ind.)	Hidekatsu Yoshii (Communist)	Kazutaka Tsuboi (LDP)	1988 by-el. (Note: Held 28 February 1988.)	Kiyoshi Nishikawa (Ind.)	Takeko Kutsunugi (Communist)	Akinori Mineyama (Komeito)	–
–	Knock Yokoyama (Ind.)	Kazuyoshi Shirahama (Komeito)	Takashi Tanihata (Socialist)	1989	Kiyoshi Nishikawa (Ind.)	Takeko Kutsunugi (Communist)	Akinori Mineyama (Komeito)	–
–	Knock Yokoyama (Ind.)	Kazuyoshi Shirahama (Komeito)	Takashi Tanihata (Socialist)	1992	Kiyoshi Nishikawa (Ind.)	Kazutaka Tsuboi (LDP)	Eiichi Yamashita (Komeito)	–
–	Yoshiki Yamashita (Communist)	Kazuyoshi Shirahama (New Frontier)	Shuzen Tanigawa (LDP)	1995	Kiyoshi Nishikawa (Ind.)	Kazutaka Tsuboi (LDP)	Eiichi Yamashita (Komeito)	–
–	Yoshiki Yamashita (Communist)	Kazuyoshi Shirahama (New Frontier)	Shuzen Tanigawa (LDP)	1998	Kiyoshi Nishikawa (Ind.)	Takeshi Miyamoto (Communist)	Eiichi Yamashita (Komeito)	–
–	Takashi Yamamoto (DPJ)	Kazuyoshi Shirahama (Komeito)	Shuzen Tanigawa (LDP)	2001	Kiyoshi Nishikawa (Ind.)	Takeshi Miyamoto (Communist)	Eiichi Yamashita (Komeito)	–
–	Takashi Yamamoto (DPJ)	Kazuyoshi Shirahama (Komeito)	Shuzen Tanigawa (LDP)	2004	Issei Kitagawa (LDP)	Motoyuki Odachi (DPJ)	Eiichi Yamashita (Komeito)	–
–	Satoshi Umemura (DPJ)	Kazuyoshi Shirahama (Komeito)	Shuzen Tanigawa (LDP)	2007	Issei Kitagawa (LDP)	Motoyuki Odachi (DPJ)	Eiichi Yamashita (Komeito)	–
–	Satoshi Umemura (DPJ)	Kazuyoshi Shirahama (Komeito)	Shuzen Tanigawa (LDP)	2010	Issei Kitagawa (LDP)	Motoyuki Odachi (DPJ)	Hirotaka Ishikawa (Komeito)	–
Toru Azuma (Ishin)	Kotaro Tatsumi (Communist)	Hisatake Sugi (Komeito)	Takuji Yanagimoto (LDP)	2013	Issei Kitagawa (LDP)	Motoyuki Odachi (DPJ)	Hirotaka Ishikawa (Komeito)	–
Toru Azuma (Ishin)	Kotaro Tatsumi (Communist)	Hisatake Sugi (Komeito)	Takuji Yanagimoto (LDP)	2016	Rui Matsukawa (LDP)	Hitoshi Asada (Ishin)	Hirotaka Ishikawa (Komeito)	Kaori Takagi (Ishin)
Toru Azuma (Ishin)	Mizuho Umemura (Ishin)	Hisatake Sugi (Komeito)	Fusae Ohta (LDP)	2019	Rui Matsukawa (LDP)	Hitoshi Asada (Ishin)	Hirotaka Ishikawa (Komeito)	Kaori Takagi (Ishin)
Toru Azuma (Ishin)	Mizuho Umemura (Ishin)	Hisatake Sugi (Komeito)	Fusae Ohta (LDP)	2022	Rui Matsukawa (LDP)	Hitoshi Asada (Ishin)	Hirotaka Ishikawa (Komeito)	Kaori Takagi (Ishin)
Sasaki Rie (Ishin)	Futoshi Okazaki (Ishin)	Hisatake Sugi (Komeito)	Chisato Miyade (Sanseito)	2025	Rui Matsukawa (LDP)	Hitoshi Asada (Ishin)	Hirotaka Ishikawa (Komeito)	Kaori Takagi (Ishin)
