= Hyōgo-ku =

Ward in Kobe, Japan

Hyogo-ku 兵庫区 ひょうごく
- Ward
- Coordinates: 34°40′33″N 135°10′00″E
- Country: Japan
- Region: Kansai
- Prefecture: Hyōgo
- City: Kobe

Area
  - Total: 14.68 km^{2} (5.67 sq mi)

Population
  - Estimate (2020): 109,144

Location of Hyōgo-ku in Kobe

Hyogo (兵庫区, Hyōgo-ku) is one of nine wards of Kobe, Japan. It has an area of 14.68 km^{2} and a population of 109,144 (as of 2020).

The area's location with a natural harbour near the Akashi Strait which links Osaka Bay and the Seto Inland Sea has been an important location throughout the history of Japan. The capital of Japan was located in the area for a short period in the 12th century. Today the area is an important manufacturing zone.

The modern ward of Hyogo was formed as Sōsai-ku (湊西区, 'Minato (a surname) West Ward') when Kobe adopted the system of wards in 1931. Its name was changed to Hyogo in 1933 and its current boundaries were settled in 1971. The floral emblem of the ward is the pansy.

== Etymology ==
The literal meaning of the two kanji that make up the name Hyogo is "weapons warehouse". From the Heian period, the area was also known as Ōwada-no-Tomari (大輪田泊, Ōwada-no-tomari).

== History ==
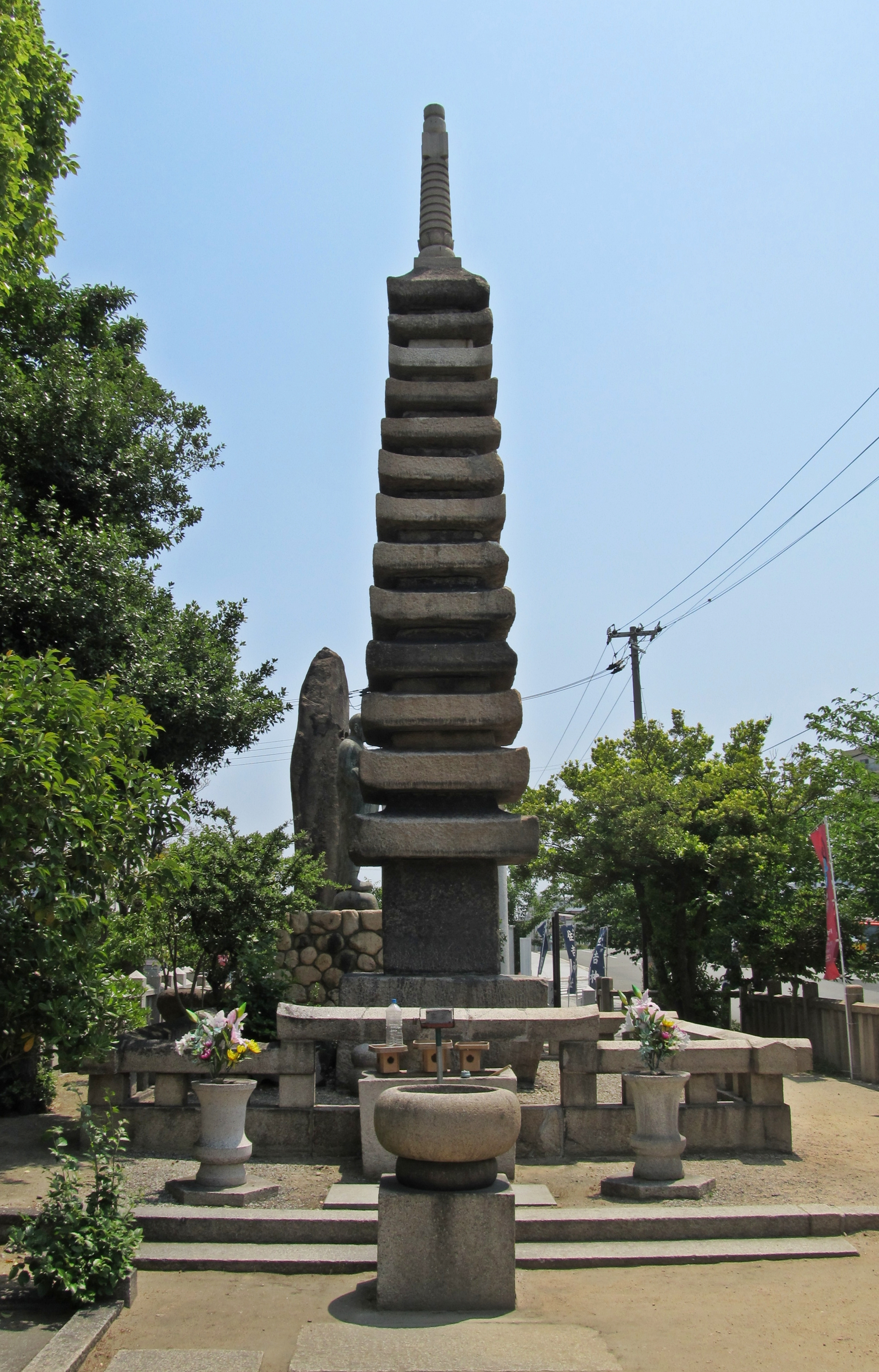
Kiyomori-zuka, a 12th-century monument to Taira no Kiyomori

=== Pre Edo period ===
The features of the natural harbour around Wadamisaki Peninsula has meant the port in Hyogo has been an important gateway to the Seto Inland Sea since the 8th-century Nara period. In the 12th century, in the latter part of the Heian period, Taira no Kiyomori recognized the strategic benefit of the location and developed the harbor, including the building of Kyogashima (ja:経が島), a man-made island completed in 1173 and described as 37 hectares in size in The Tale of the Heike. Kiyomori, the de facto ruler of Japan between 1160 and 1180, moved his official residence to Fukuhara, in what is modern-day Hyogo. Fukuhara became the capital of Japan for a brief period near the end of Kiyomori's rule. A monument erected shortly after his death, the Kiyomori-zuka, stands in the gardens of a shrine opposite Kiyomori Bridge, also named in his honour.

=== Edo-Meiji periods ===
During the Edo period Hyogo was within the Yatabe District of Settsu Province. Although Japan was placed under isolation by the ruling Tokugawa shogunate, Hyogo Port remained an important route for domestic trade. Given its importance, Hyogo Port was under the direct administration of the Shogunate via the Osaka machi-bugyō. In 1868, at the end of the Edo period, Hyogo port was one of the first to be opened to foreign vessels, ending Japan's 250-year long isolation.

As part of the Shogunate's efforts to protect Japan from Western colonial forces, the defence of Hyogo Port was upgraded with the construction of the Wadamisaki Battery, one of six land batteries built around Osaka Bay under the design of Count Katsu Kaishū. It was completed in 1864 after 18 months of construction at a cost of 25,000 ryō. The outer enceinte was built of granite from the Shiwaku Islands and the inner two-storey structure was made of keyaki (Japanese elm) wood harvested from the Nunobiki and Tekkai Mountains in Kobe. In 1921 the battery was the first place in Hyogo Prefecture to be designated as a historic site by the prefectural government.

Also, the Wadamisaki Lighthouse was completed in 1871 under the guidance of the "father of Japanese lighthouses", Englishman Richard Henry Brunton, who was brought to Japan by the Shogunate under an 1867 agreement with the United Kingdom to build five western-style lighthouses around Osaka Bay. The original lighthouse, which was first illuminated in 1872, was a wooden octagonal structure. This was replaced with a 17m tall, three-story, steel hexagonal structure in 1884. The steel lighthouse was moved to the Suma Kaihin (Seaside) Park in Suma-ku in 1967 and in September 1998 it was registered as a national tangible cultural asset under the name Old Wadamisaki Lighthouse (旧和田岬灯台, Kyū-Wadamisaki Tōdai).

=== Modern period ===
On 1 September 1931, the city of Kobe was the 6th city in Japan to adopt the system of dividing the city into wards. The area of the previous Hyogo town which lay west of the Minato River became Sōsai-ku (湊西区, 'Minato (a surname) West Ward'). The area of Hyogo town which lay east of the Minato River became part of Sōtō-ku (湊東区, 'Minato (a surname) East Ward'). On 1 January 1933, Sōsai's name was changed to Hyogo in recognition of the area's historic name.

=== Bombing during World War II ===
The concentration of military and industrial manufacturing facilities including Kobe Steel, Kawanishi Aircraft Company Kawasaki Aircraft Industries and the Kawasaki and Mitsubishi Shipyards made the city of Kobe a primary target of bombing by the United States during World War II. It suffered the highest fatality rate of the five major Japanese cities (the others being Tokyo, Yokohama, Nagoya and Osaka).

The first attack upon Kobe was by one B-25 bomber as a part of the Dolittle Raid on 18 April 1942. With Japan's success in expanding its territory through south-east Asia at the time, an attack by foreign aircraft was not expected at the time and it was reported that some residents even waved flags at the plane as it flew overhead, thinking it was a Japanese aircraft. One resident of Hyogo ward was the only fatality of the bombing of Kobe on that day.

In 1945, the United States changed tactics from strategic bombing of military sites to indiscriminate bombing of cities, including the use of incendiary cluster bombs. The first successful firebombing raid against Japan was an attack on Kobe on 4 February 1945. The bombing was centred upon Hyogo and Minato wards.

With the final attack upon eastern Kobe in June 1945, the United States command determined that Kobe had been destroyed to the extent that further attacks upon the city were not required. By the end of the war, Kobe had suffered more than 7,400 deaths due to the air raids (Hyogo-ku had suffered 1250 deaths.). Hyogo suffered the highest toll in terms of both lives lost and buildings destroyed.

=== 1995 Kobe earthquake ===
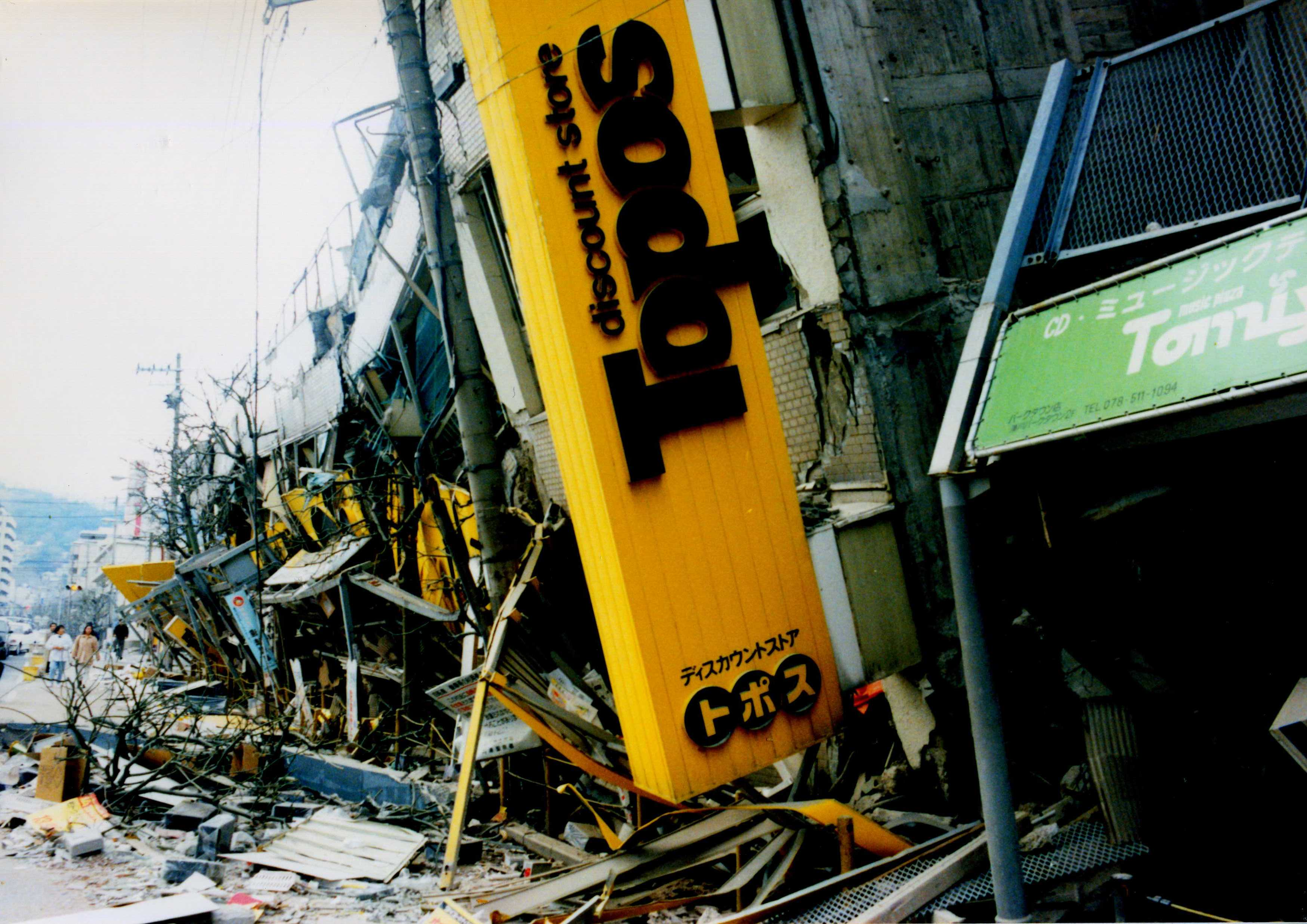
A collapsed Topos discount store in the Minatogawa neighbourhood of Hyogo

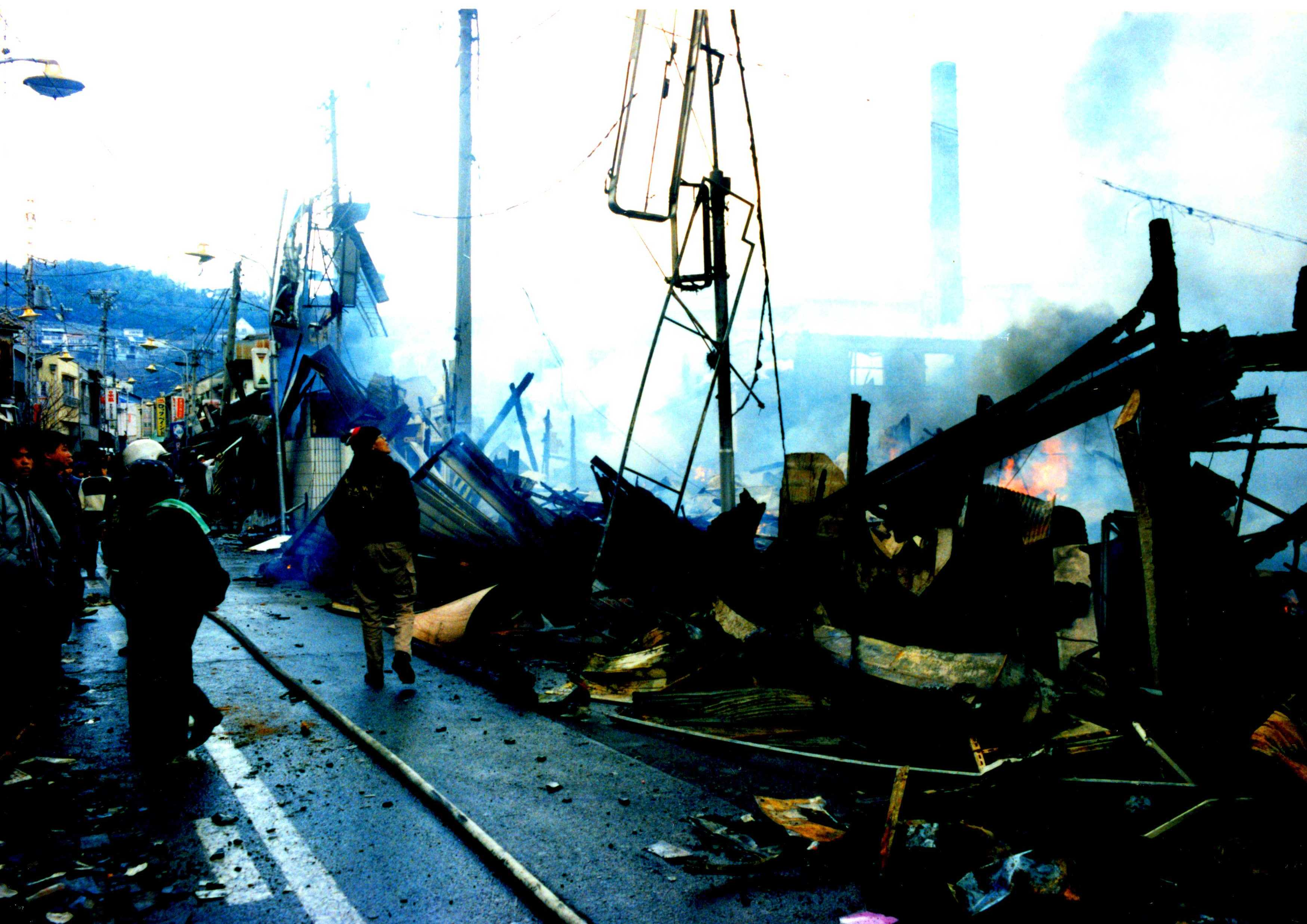
Burnt remains of wooden structures in the Shinminatogawa shopping arcade

At 5:46 on 17 January 1995, the Great Hanshin earthquake (阪神・淡路大震災, Hanshin Awaji daishinsai) (also known as the Kobe earthquake) devastated Kobe and the surrounding cities of the Hanshin region. Along with buildings that collapsed due to the earthquake, large areas of wooden houses and buildings burnt uncontrolled for many days, particularly in Nagata and Hyogo wards. A total of 6,434 people died in the earthquake, of which the city of Kobe recorded fire as the cause of death of 528 people.

Infrastructure in Hyogo was also significantly damaged by the earthquake. The underground Daikai Station collapsed and brought down National Route 28 that runs above it. The loss of lives and infrastructure saw Hyogo lose a significant portion of its population; the ward's population has failed to return to its 1994 level twenty years later.

== Geography ==
Hyogo is bounded by Osaka Bay to the south, Kita Ward to the north, Nagata Ward to the west and Chūō Ward to the east. It features the eastern portion of a network of canals named the "Hyogo Canals" (Hyogo Unga) in the south, and its northern border is at the base of the Rokko mountains.

=== Hyogo Canals ===
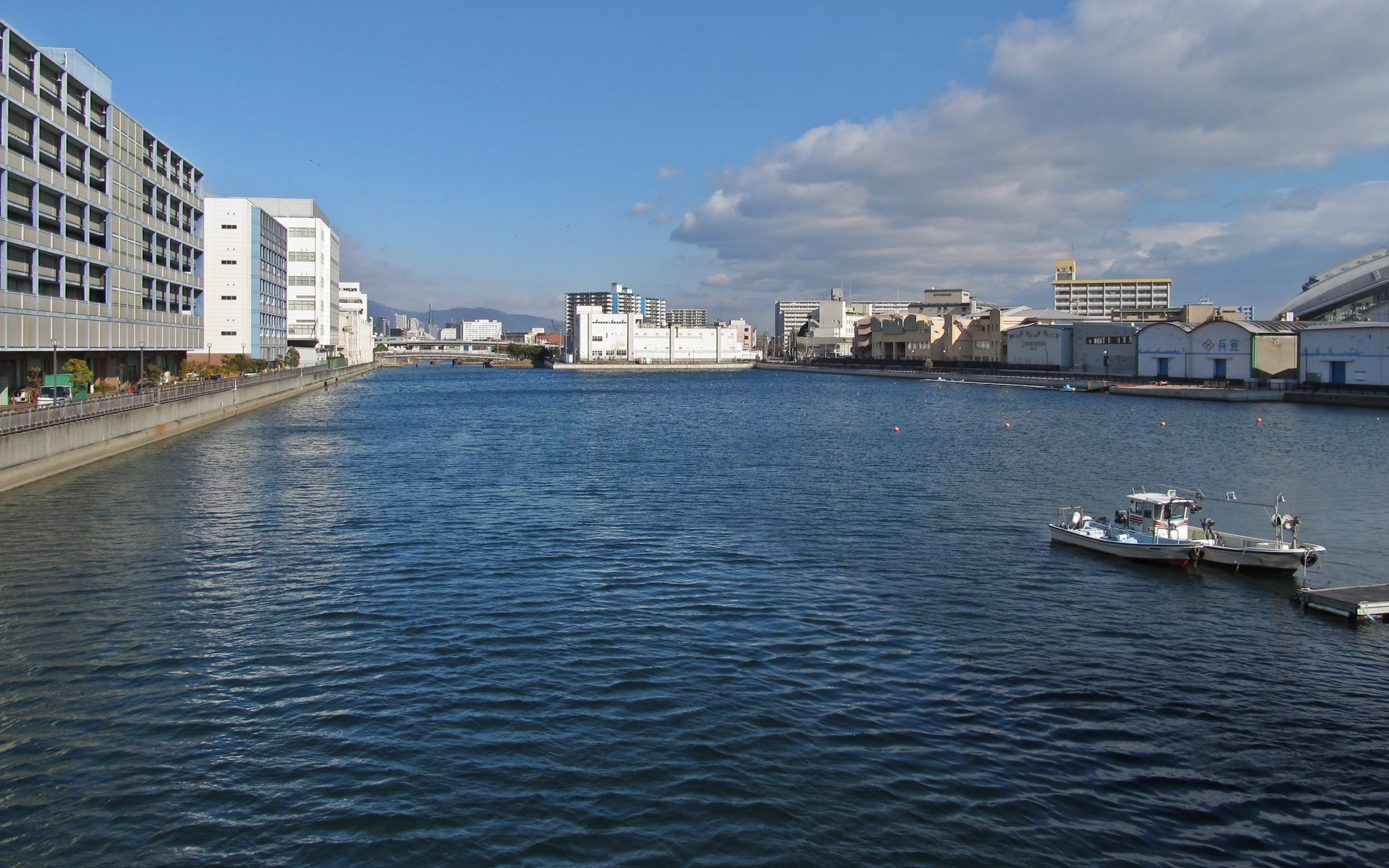
Hyogo Canal

The Hyogo Unga is the generic name for the network of five canals located along the southern coast of Hyogo and Nagata Wards, facing Osaka Bay. The canals have a total length of 6,470 metres and total area of almost 34 hectares, making it one of the largest canal networks in Japan. They were first planned in the 1870s and completed in December 1899.

Eastern end of Hyogo Canal from Kiyomori Bridge

The five canals are:

1. Shinkawa Canal – The first canal to be completed, it was built between 1874 and 1876.
2. Hyogo Canal
3. Hyogo Feeder Canal
4. Karumojima Canal – The longest canal at 2,200m.
5. Shinminatogawa Canal – The shortest canal at 320m.

=== Boundary changes ===
Sōsai-ku was one of eight wards established when the system of wards was adopted by the city on 1 September 1931. Following the name change to Hyogo in 1933, the next change occurred on 1 May 1945 when the city restructured the wards, with Hyogo expanded to include Minato-ku, the western portion of Sōtō-ku, and the portion of Hayashida-ku that lay east of the Hyogo Canals.。

On 1 March 1947, the city of Kobe expanded due to the merger of the town of Arima and nine other villages from the districts of Muko, Arima and Akashi. Of these, Arima town and the villages Yamada in Muko and Arino in Arima District became a part of Hyogo ward. On 1 July 1951 the villages of Hata, Dōjō and Ōzō that were located in Arima District merged into Kobe and Hyogo ward. On 15 October 1955 Nagao village in Arima merged into Kobe and Hyogo ward. This was followed by the village Ōgo of Minō District on 1 February 1958. This expansion northwards made Hyogo the largest of Kobe's wards in size, encompassing 256.4 km^{2} of Kobe's 557 km^{2}.

On 1 August 1973, the area of Hyogo north of the Rokko mountains, consisting of all of the former villages from the districts of Arima, Minō and Muko, were split from Hyogo to create the new Kita-ku. This reduced Hyogo to its current size of 14.68 km^{2}.

== Economy ==
=== Industry ===
Hyogo is one of the main industrial areas of Kobe. Fujitsu Ten is headquartered within the ward, and other large corporations including Kawasaki Heavy Industries, Mitsubishi Electric and Mitsubishi Heavy Industries have manufacturing facilities in Hyogo. In particular, railcars for the bullet train are manufactured in Hyogo by Kawasaki.In 2018 one of the renowned aerospace firms of USA established its subsidiary in Kobe called Swift Xi.

== Arts and culture ==
=== Temples and shrines ===
==== Buddhist temples ====
As well as several monuments to Kiyomori, Hyogo is also the location of Nōfuku-ji temple, home of the Hyogo Daibutsu, an 11-metre-tall statue of Buddha. This statue is the second generation, erected in 1991. The first one was erected in 1891 and was one of the three great Buddhist statues of Japan (Three great Daibutu of Japan), but was dismantled due to World War II.

==== Shinto shrines and festivals ====
Yanagihara Ebisu Shrine is in the centre of Hyogo, close to Hyogo Station. It hosts the Tōka-Ebisu Festival (十日恵比寿大祭, Tōka-Ebisu Taisai; "10th Day Ebisu Grand Festival"), an annual festival held from 9 to 11 January in honour of Ebisu, the Shinto god of commerce. At the event people pray for success in their business, the health and safety of their family, and success in studies and obtaining employment. Tōka-Ebisu is the most important cultural event in Hyogo throughout the year.

A yakuyoke festival (厄除大祭, yakuyoke taisai) is held annually from 18 to 19 January at two Hachiman shrines within Hyogo, the Minatogawa Hachiman Shrine and Misaki Hachiman Shrine. People who are approaching an "unlucky age" (yakudoshi) attend the shrine during the two days in order to undergo a yakuharai ritual to ward off unlucky spirits.

==== Other places of worship ====
A Soka Gakkai church is located in the Misaki neighbourhood, close to the eastern end of the Hyogo canal. A Jehovah's Witnesses church is also located in the Misaki-Honmachi neighbourhood.

=== Entertainment ===
The Shinkaichi area in eastern Hyogo, with its numerous cinemas, theatres and restaurants, was known as the "Western Asakusa" in the period before World War II.

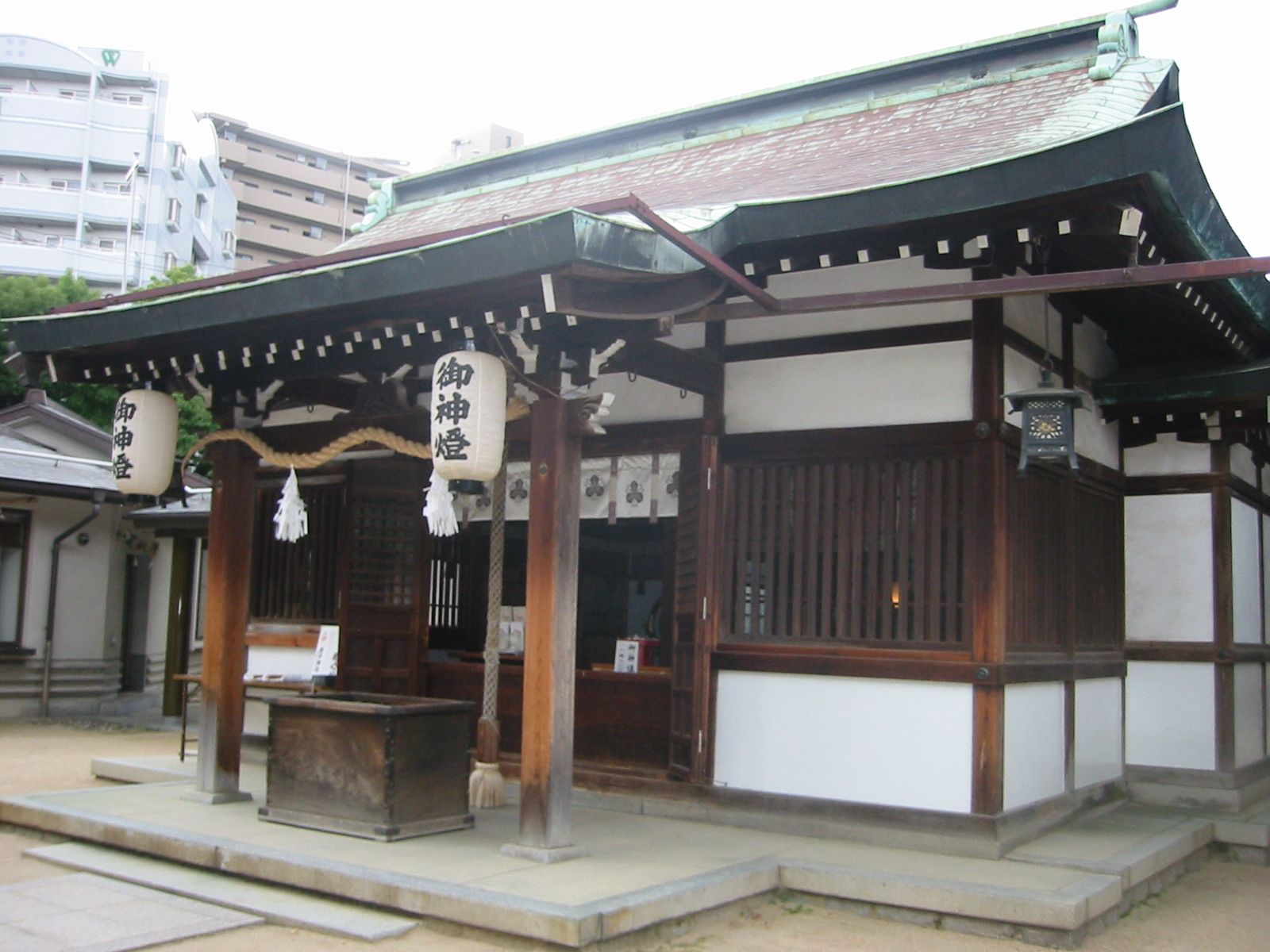
Main hall of Yanagihara Ebisu Shrine

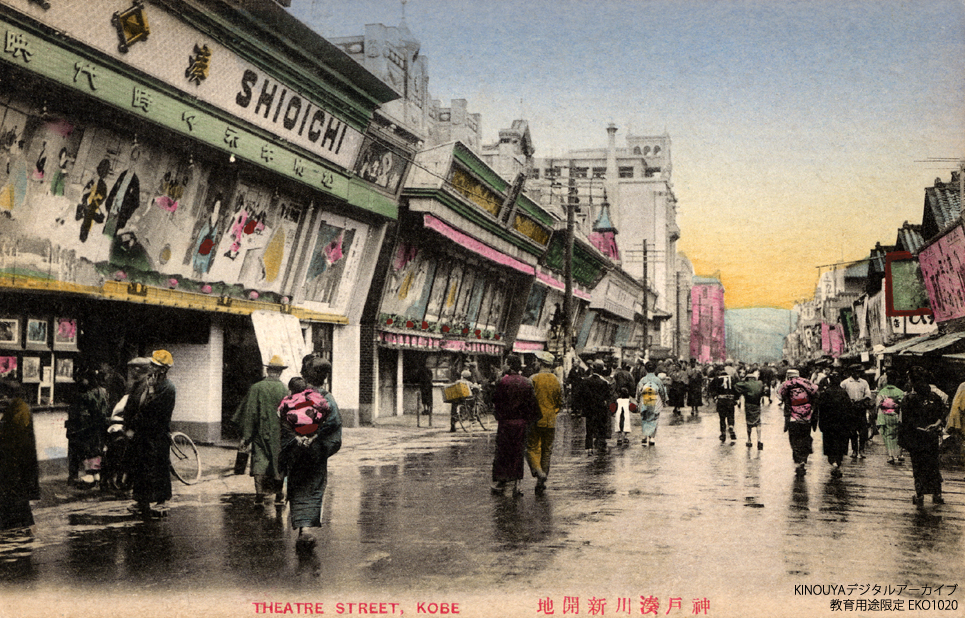
Pre-war Shinkaichi

== Demographics ==
Hyogo-ku's population is decreasing now. There is the second Vietnamese community in Kobe.

year	population	reference
1935	145,064	
1940	149,363	
1945	70,848	
1947	130,633	
1950	160,127	
1955	211,414	
1960	238,592	
1965	254,076	
1970	269,639	
1975	165,868	
1980	142,418	
1985	130,429	
1990	123,919	
1995	98,856	
2000	106,897	
2005	106,985	
2010	108,304	
2015	106,956	
2020	109,144	

Foreigners in Hyogo-ku, Kobe
Nationality	Population (2018)
China	1,990
Vietnam	1,631
South Korea	1,410
Others	793

== Sports ==
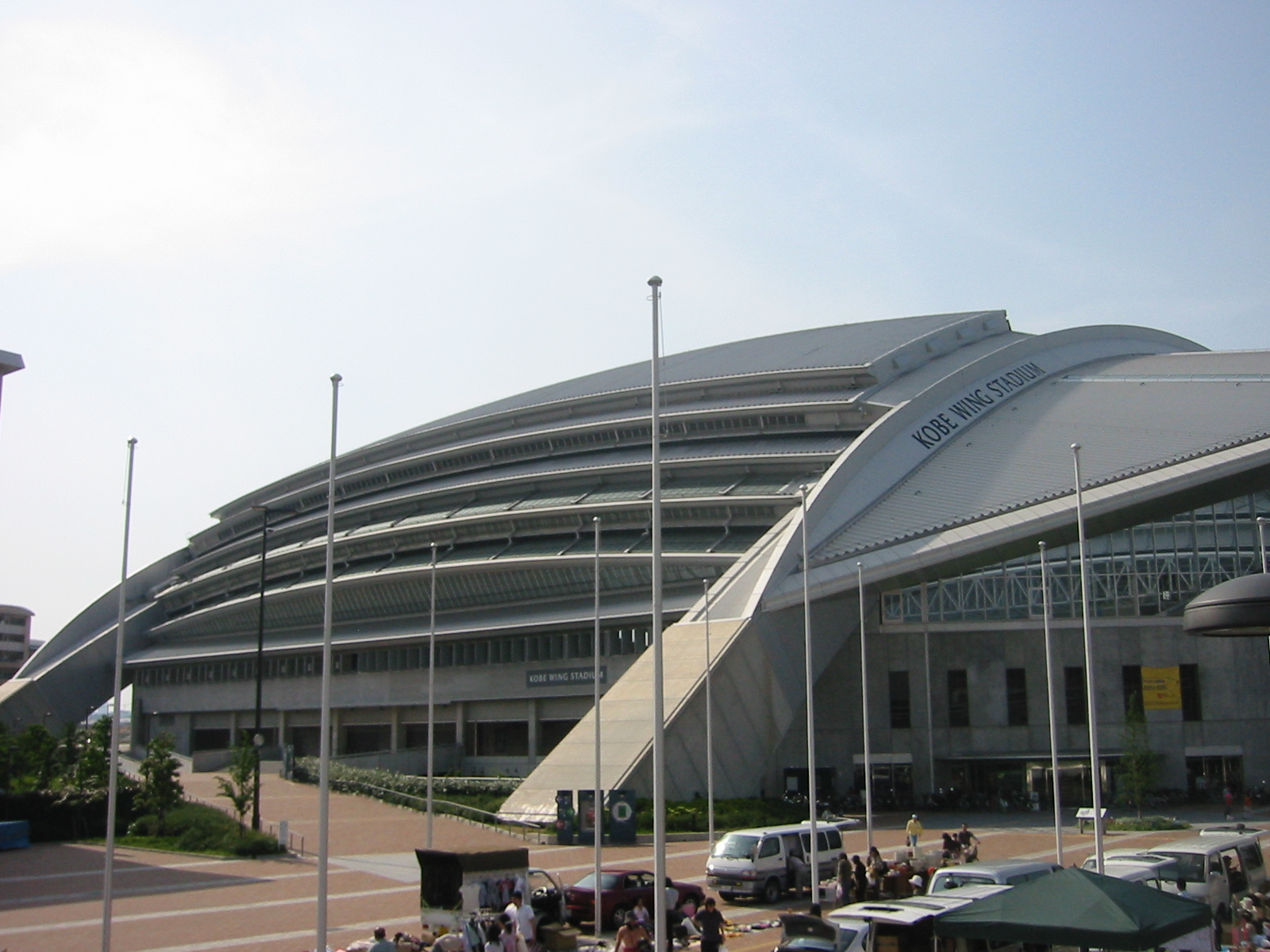
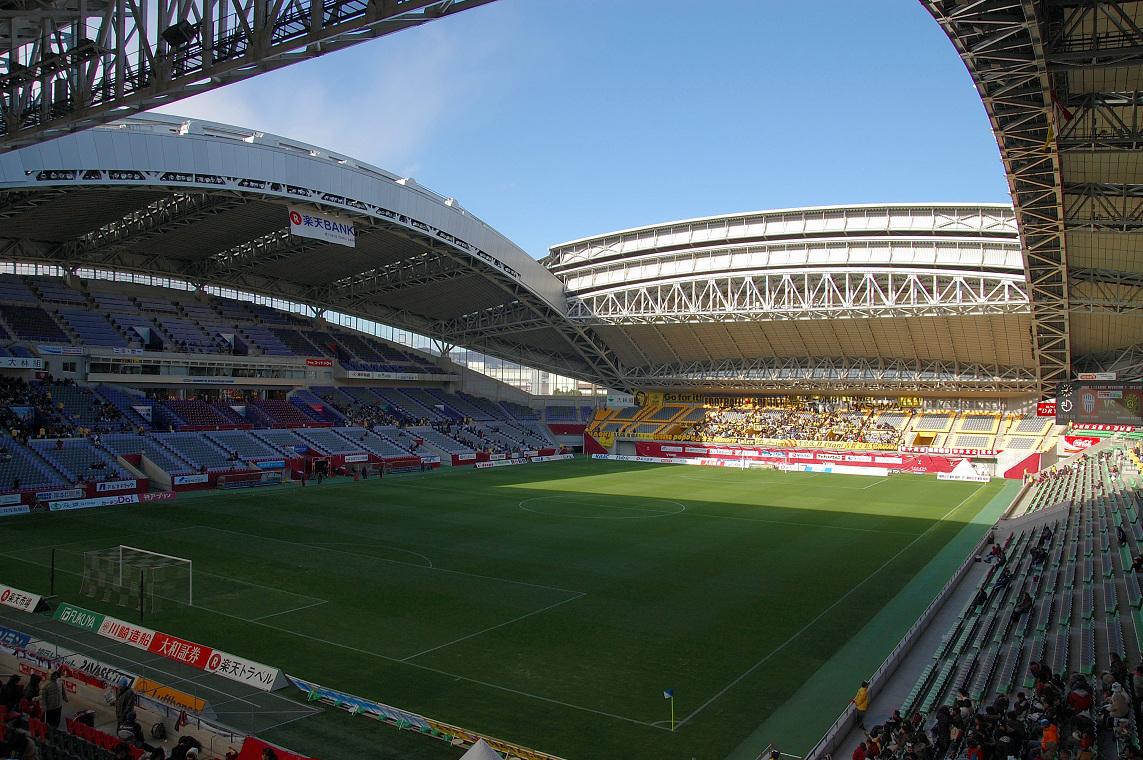
Outside and inside views of Misaki Park Stadium

Misaki Park Stadium is the home of the Vissel Kobe professional soccer and Kobelco Steelers professional rugby teams. The stadium hosted matches during the 2002 FIFA World Cup and will also be one of the hosts of the 2019 Rugby World Cup.

It was built on the site of the former Kobe Central Stadium, which occupied the location from 1970 until 1999. At the time of its construction, the Central Stadium was the first rectangular ball sports stadium built in Japan with lighting for night matches. It hosted one of the groups 1979 FIFA World Youth Championship as well as a quarter final and semi final of the tournament. The Kobe Keirin Stadium previously occupied the site and was in use from 1949 until 1960.

== Government ==
Hyogo is administered by the Hyogo ward office, which is located next to Minatogawa Station and Minatogawa Park. The Hyogo Police Station of the Hyogo Prefectural Police is located in the same vicinity and is responsible for policing the ward (excluding the marine areas that fall within the Kobe Water Police's jurisdiction). It maintains 14 kōban ("police boxes") within the ward and a substation near Hyogo Station.

The ward is represented by 5 councilors in the 69-seat Kobe City council assembly. In the April 2015 unified local elections, two candidates from the Liberal Democratic Party and one each from the Komeito, Communist and Innovation/Democratic (joint endorsement) were elected to the council. Takashi Moriya, an LDP member elected to his sixth term in the council, was subsequently elected by the council's members to serve as the council's chairman.

Hyogo has two representatives on the 86-seat Hyogo Prefectural Assembly. At the April 2015 election Issei Matsuda of the Komeito Party was elected to his fourth term and Shigetoshi Fukushima of the Liberal Democratic Party was elected to his first term.

At the national level, the wards of Hyogo, Nagata and Kita form Hyogo No. 2 District in the House of Representatives. Kazuyoshi Akaba of the Komeito Party has represented the district from 1993 to 2009 and again from 2012 until present, most recently elected to his 7th term in the December 2014 general election. Upon his return to the Diet in 2012 Akaba served as a Senior Vice-Minister for Economy, Trade and Industry and Senior Vice-Minister for the Cabinet Office in Prime Minister Shinzo Abe's second cabinet from December 2012 until September 2014. Voter turnout at the December 2014 general election was 45.7% of Hyogo's 89,848 eligible voters, the second lowest percentage in Kobe and below the national turnout rate of 52.66%. Electors in Hyogo also vote to elect members to the House of Representatives as part of the Kinki proportional representation block. For the House of Councillors, Hyogo is within the Hyogo at-large district, which covers the entire prefecture and elects a total of 4 councilors, while residents also vote for the national PR block.

== Education ==
The following educational institutions are located in Hyogo:

=== High schools ===
references:

- Kobe Technical High School (operated by the Hyogo Prefectural Government)
- Hyogo Technical High School (operated by the Hyogo Prefectural Government)
- Kobe Gakuin University High School (operated by Kobe Gakuin University)
- Kusunoki Senior High School (operated by the City of Kobe)
- Shinko Senior High School (operated by the City of Kobe)

=== Junior high schools ===
All junior high schools in Hyogo are operated by the City of Kobe:

- Hyogo JHS
  - Hyogo JHS (Northern Campus)
- Minatogawa JHS
- Susano JHS
- Yoshida JHS
- Yumeno JHS

=== Elementary schools ===
All elementary schools in Hyogo are operated by the City of Kobe:

- Arata ES
- Egeyama ES
- Hamayama ES
- Hirano ES
- Hyogo Daikai ES
- Kobe Gion ES
- Meishin ES
- Minatoyama ES
- Mizuki ES
- Wadamisaki ES
- Yumenono'oka ES^{[a]}

=== Special education ===
- Kobe Yuusei Special Education School: A school for physically and mentally handicapped children, it has classes for children from kindergarten to high school.

== Infrastructure ==
=== Transportation ===
==== Rail ====
Hyogo is served by the JR Kobe Line and Wadamisaki spur line, the Kaigan and Seishin-Yamate lines of the Kobe Municipal Subway, Shintetsu Arima Line of the Kobe Electric Railway, and the Tozai Line (which carries Hankyu, Hanshin and Sanyo services).

==== Road ====
Japan National Route 2 is the main arterial road through the area. Route 3 (Kobe Route) of the Hanshin Expressway runs above National Route 2 and the Yanagihara entrance/exit ramp provides a connection point. Other highways that run through the ward include National Routes 28 and 428.

=== Utilities ===
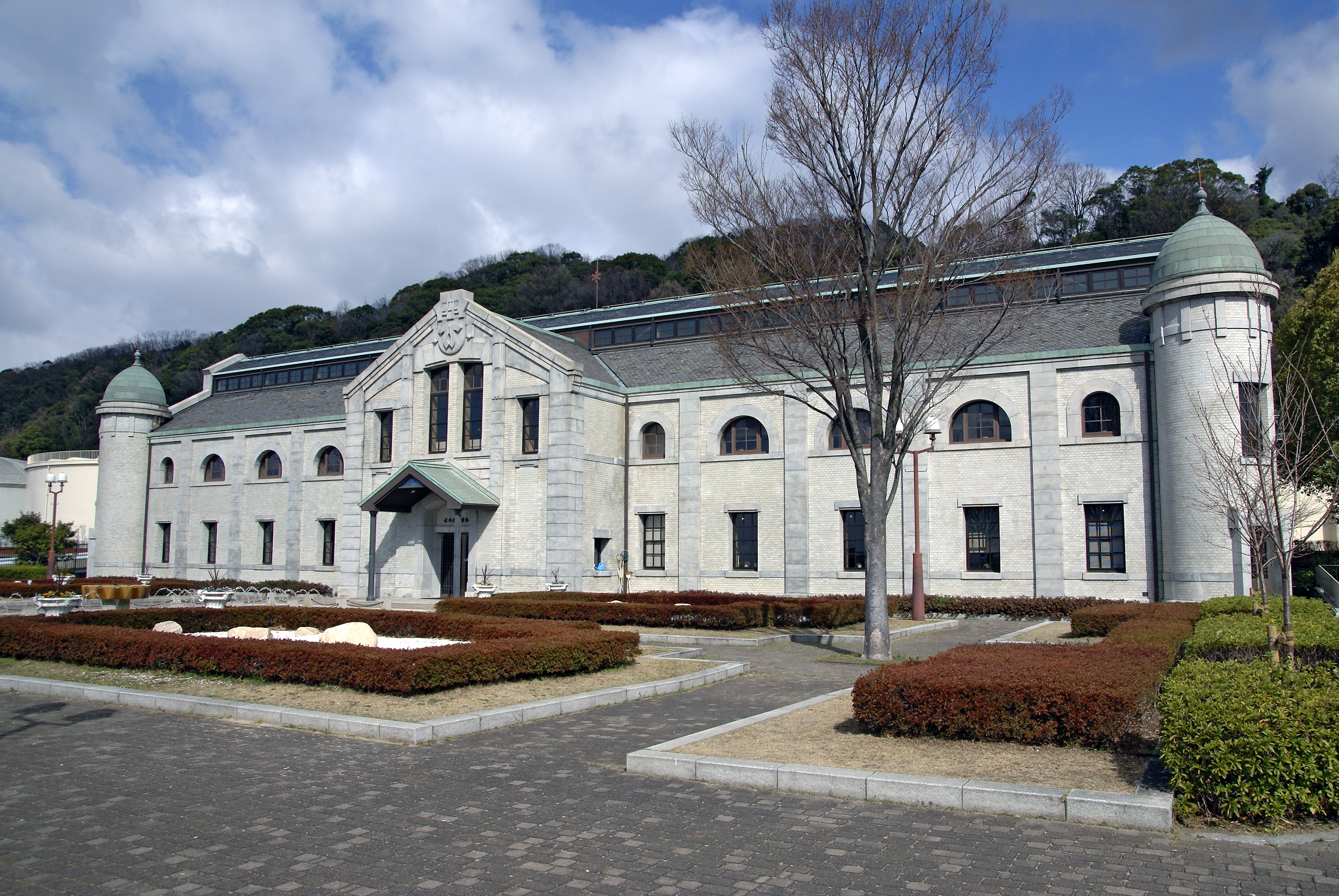
Kobe Water Science Museum

Water utilities in the ward are under the responsibility of the Kobe city water bureau. The Okuhirano Water Purification Plant, located in Kusudani-cho in the north of the ward, was opened in 1900 and was the 7th modern waterworks plant to be constructed in Japan. It occupies a 65,000m^{2} site and is capable of processing 60,000m^{3} of water per day. The Kobe Water Science Museum is also located on the site.

Hyogo Post Office is the main office of Japan Post within the ward. It is located in Daikaidōri, in the centre of the ward, and operates a further 19 offices within the ward.

=== Wholesale market ===
The Kobe City Central Wholesale Market (ja:神戸市中央卸売市場) is located on Nakanojima Island, in the southeastern corner of the ward. The market was first built in Hyogo port in 1932 and was the fifth such market to be opened in Japan. The market sells seafood, fruit and vegetables via wholesale and auction, and operates a further two markets in Nagata and Higashinada wards. There are restaurants and retail shops on site and an Aeon shopping mall opened opposite the market in September 2016. The Chūō-Ichibamae Station of the Kaigan subway line is located beneath the market.

== Notable people ==
- Takeo Azuma (1878–unknown) – silent film actor
- Kazume Iritani (born 1961) – rakugo musician
- Karumogawa Shinjiro (1886-unknown) – sumo wrestler
- Hide Kawanishi (1894–1965) – printmaker and painter
- Kazuki Kuriyama (born 1963) – songwriter and producer
- Atsuhiro Mitsuhara (born 1980) – baseball player
- Nobuo Okishio (1927–2003) – economics professor
- Shiko Saito (1901–1961) – actor
- Takatōriki Tadashige (born 1967) – sumo wrestler
- Minami Uehara (born 1969) – television presenter and Kobe city councillor
- Miyuki Utsumi (born 1957) – singer
- Knock Yokoyama (1932–2007) – comedian and politician
- Hishofuji Hiroki (born 1989) – sumo wrestler and Professional wrestler

== Notes ==
^a. Opened in 2009 as a result of a merger of Kikusui, Higashiyama, Hiyodorigoe and Yumeno Elementary Schools.
