= 2015 Nishinomiya by-election =

The 2015 Nishinomiya by-election (兵庫県議会議員西宮市選挙区補欠選挙, Hyōgo Kengikai Giin Nishinomiya Senkyoku Hoketsu Senkyo, Hyōgo Prefectural Assembly Nishinomiya District By-Election) was a by-election held on 25 January 2015 to fill two vacancies in the seven-member Nishinomiya district of the Hyogo Prefectural Assembly.

Five candidates contested the two seats. Masakazu Yoshioka of the Liberal Democratic Party and Yugo Nakano of the then-recently formed Japan Innovation Party were elected, winning 29.4% and 24.6% of the vote respectively. Voter turnout was 21.3%, the second-lowest ever for a by-election for the assembly.

== Background ==
The vacancies arose due to the resignations of Ryutaro Nonomura, who was caught in a scandal surrounding inappropriate expense claims, and Haruyo Omae, who had resigned to seek a seat in the House of representatives in the December 2014 national general election.

== Candidates ==
Five candidates had nominated for the election by the deadline on 16 January 2015; none of whom had previously held a seat in the prefectural assembly. The candidates in order of their time of nomination were:

Candidates for 2015 Nishinomiya by-election
Name	Party	Age	Occupation
Toyotake Moriike	Independent	68	Citizens group leader, former Nishinomiya city councilor (3 terms)
Naomi Okuno	Democratic Party of Japan	49	Elementary school teacher
Yugo Nakano	Japan Innovation Party	32	Manufacturing company president
Masakazu Yoshioka	Liberal Democratic Party	40	Company president, former Nishinomiya city councilor (2 terms)
Hironori Sakai	Independent	38	Company president

== Results ==
Yoshioka and Nakano won the two vacancies by receiving the highest number of votes under the Single non-transferable voting system. Voter turnout was 21.3%, the second-lowest turnout for a by-election for the Hyogo assembly behind the 16.95% that voted at a 2000 by-election. During the campaign, Yoshioka relied upon his record of 8 years and 2 terms as a Nishinomiya city councilor, stating that a "battle-ready politician is necessary". On the other hand, Nakano broadened his support by focusing on reform including measures to help families with children, claiming that "cutting reform must come first, as we musn't pass the tab on to our children".

2015 Nishinomiya By-election
Party	Candidate	Votes	%	±%
LDP	Masakazu Yoshioka	22,907	29.4	
Ishin	Yugo Nakano	22,907	24.6	
Democratic	Naomi Okuno	15,436	19.8	
Independent	Toyotake Moriike	11,046	14.2	
Independent	Hironori Sakai	9340	12.0	
Turnout		80,693	21.30	

== Effect ==
Upon the entry of the two new members into the Assembly, Junko Tokuyasu resigned from the Democratic Party and joined with Nakano to give the Innovation Party two members in the 89-seat Assembly. Yoshioka increased the Liberal Democratic Party's membership to 44 in the Assembly, giving the party a one-person majority due to two other seats being vacant.

Both Yoshioka and Nakano retained their seats in at the general election held 11 weeks later in April 2015. Omae returned to the Assembly after unsuccessfully contesting the national election, while Okuno and Moriike were once again unsuccessful at winning one of the seven vacant seats. Overall, the Innovation Party increased their representation in the assembly to nine seats while the Liberal Democrats were reduced to 40. The overall number of seats were reduced from 89 to 87 due to the merger of districts.
