= Shinsuke Suematsu =

Japanese politician (born 1955)

- 末松 信介
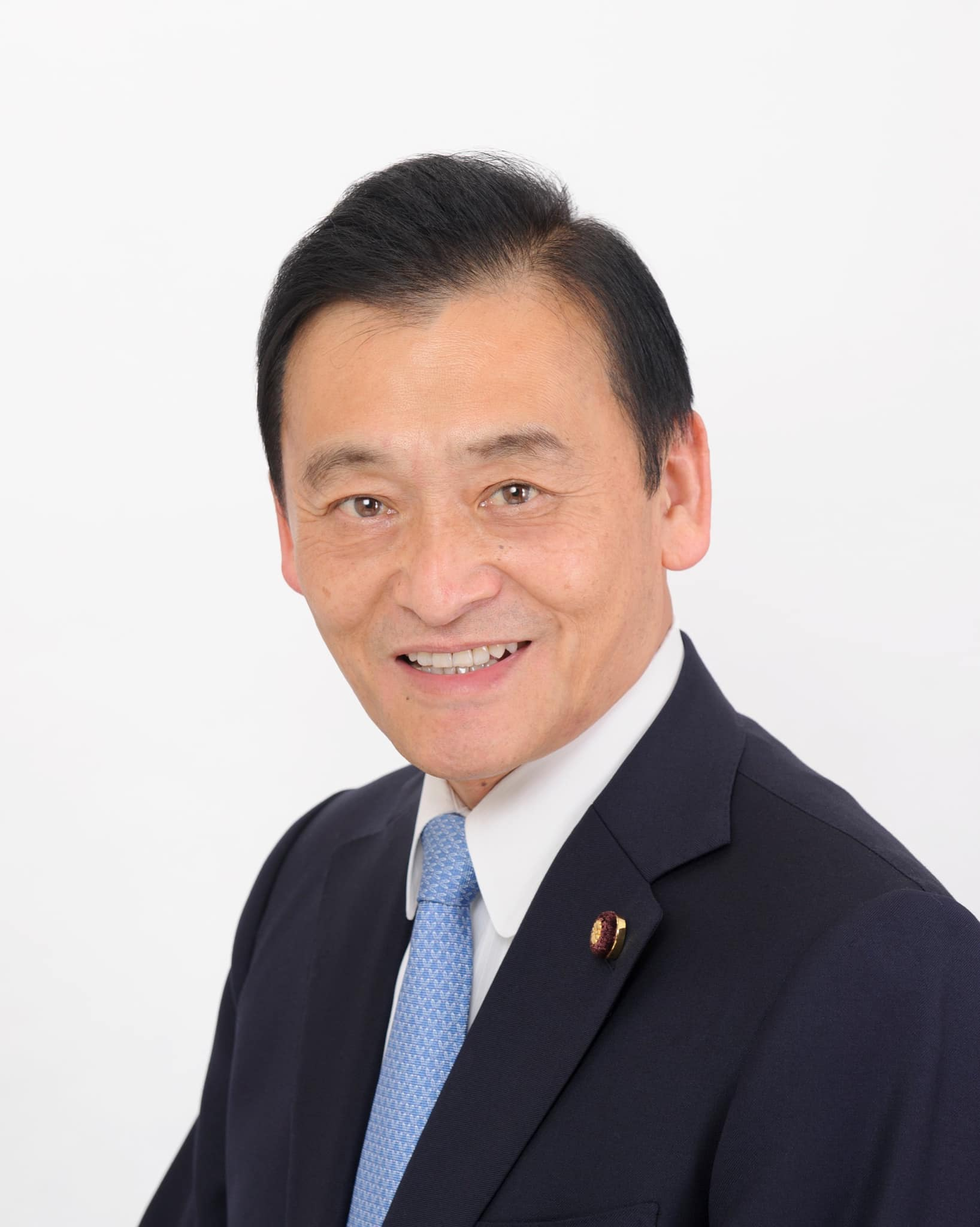
- Official portrait, 2021

Minister of Education, Culture, Sports, Science and Technology
- In office 4 October 2021 – 10 August 2022
- Prime Minister: Fumio Kishida
- Preceded by: Kōichi Hagiuda
- Succeeded by: Keiko Nagaoka

Senior Vice Minister of Finance
- In office 2 August 2008 – 16 September 2009 Serving with Norio Mitsuya
- Prime Minister: Yasuo Fukuda; Taro Aso
- Preceded by: Ichiro Miyashita; Akio Koizumi
- Succeeded by: Hiroshi Ogushi; Shinichiro Furumoto

Member of the House of Councillors
- Incumbent
- Assumed office 26 July 2004
- Preceded by: Tatsumi Ōsawa
- Constituency: Hyōgo at-large

Member of the Hyogo Prefectural Assembly
- In office 1995 – 24 June 2004
- Succeeded by: Yuichiro Wada
- Constituency: Tarumi Ward, Kobe
- In office 1983–1993
- Constituency: Tarumi Ward, Kobe

Personal details
- Born: 17 December 1955 (age 70) Tarumi, Kobe, Japan
- Party: Liberal Democratic
- Spouse: Yumi Suematsu

Shinsuke Suematsu (末松 信介, Suematsu Shinsuke; born December 17, 1955) is a Japanese politician who serves as a member of the House of Councillors in the Diet of Japan. He has represented the Hyogo at-large district as a member of the Liberal Democratic Party since 2004. He served as Minister of Education, Culture, Sports, Science and Technology from 2021 to 2022.

== Early life ==
Suematsu was born on December 17, 1955, in Kobe, Hyōgo Prefecture. He graduated from the School of Law and Politics, Kwansei Gakuin University in 1979 and worked for All Nippon Airways.

== Political career ==
Suematsu entered politics in 1983, successfully contesting the Hyogo Prefectural Assembly election as a Liberal Democratic Party (LDP) candidate. He served six consecutive terms in the assembly, and was elected deputy speaker of the assembly in 1996. In April 2003 Suematsu was elected to his sixth term, winning the highest number of votes in the three-member Tarumi district with 39.4%. On 24 June 2004 he resigned from the assembly to contest the House of Councillors election scheduled for the following month.

In the election for two Councillors in the Hyogo at-large district, Suematsu finished second behind Shunichi Mizuoka of the Democratic Party of Japan with 33.5% of the vote. During his first term as a Councillor, Suematsu was appointed as a vice minister for finance in a cabinet reshuffle by Prime Minister Yasuo Fukuda. Suematsu retained the position when Fukuda was replaced by Taro Aso in September 2008 and remained in the position until the LDP lost power at the September 2009 general election.

Suematsu was elected to a second term at the July 2010 House of Councillors election. On this occasion he received the highest vote with 29.4%. Mizuoka retained his seat in the House, finishing second in a field of seven candidates with 21.8%.

On 10 August 2022, Suematsu was dismissed from the Second Kishida Cabinet because of ties to the Unification Church. His dismissal was part of a wider purge by the Kishida administration following the assassination of Shinzo Abe and increasing media scrutiny of LDP officials' close ties with the church.

House of Councillors
Preceded by Tatsumi Osawa, Shōji Motooka	Councillor for Hyogo at-large district 2004–present	Incumbent
Political offices
Preceded by Kōichi Hagiuda	Minister of Education, Culture, Sports, Science and Technology; 2021–2022	Succeeded by Keiko Nagaoka
