= Hiroyuki Kada =

Japanese politician

- 加田 裕之
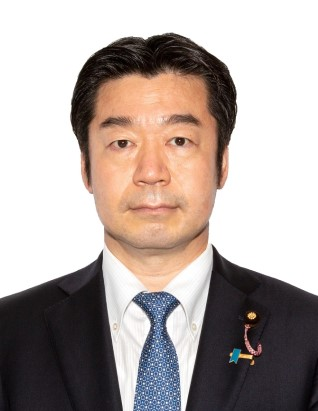
- Official portrait, 2021

Member of the House of Councillors
- Incumbent
- Assumed office 29 July 2019
- Preceded by: Yoshitada Konoike
- Constituency: Hyōgo at-large

Member of the Hyogo Prefectural Assembly
- In office 11 June 2003 – 4 July 2019
- Constituency: Nagata Ward, Kobe

Personal details
- Born: 8 June 1970 (age 56) Nada, Kobe, Japan
- Party: Liberal Democratic
- Education: Konan University

Hiroyuki Kada is a Japanese politician and member of the House of Councillors of Japan. He has represented the Hyogo at-large district since he was elected in 2019. Between 2003 and 2019, he was a representative in the Hyogo Prefectural Assembly.

== Career ==
In 1993, he graduated from Konan University and joined the newspaper The Kobe Shimbun Company. He worked as Official Secretary to Toru Okutani, then a member of the House of Representatives. In 2003, he was in the Hyogo Prefectural Assembly for four terms, serving as vice-chairperson for a term. In 2018, Yoshitada Konoike died in office, so he decided to run for office.

As of 2022, he serves as Parliamentary Vice-Minister of Justice. He has met with multiple foreign officials to strengthen law and cooperation.
