= Takayuki Shimizu =

Takayuki Shimizu may refer to:

- Takayuki Shimizu (baseball) (清水 隆行) (born 1973), Japanese former professional baseball outfielder and current coach
- Takayuki Shimizu (politician) (清水 貴之) (born 1974), Japanese politician, member of the House of Councillors
