= Kawanishi =

Kawanishi may refer to:

== Places ==
- Kawanishi, Hyōgo
- Kawanishi, Nara
- Kawanishi, Yamagata
- Kawanishi, Niigata – now merged into Tōkamachi

== People with the surname ==
- Hide Kawanishi (川西 英; 1894–1965), Japanese painter
- Kengo Kawanishi (河西 健吾; born 1985), Japanese voice actor
- Shigeko Kawanishi (川西 繁子; born 1948), Japanese swimmer
- Takumi Kawanishi (川西 拓実; born 1999), Japanese idol

== Other uses ==
- Kawanishi Aircraft Company, a former Japanese aircraft manufacturer
