= Mineo (given name) =

Mineo is a masculine Japanese given name. Notable people with the name include:

- Mineo Ōsumi (大角 岑生, 1876–1941), Japanese politician and Commander of the Japanese Navy during World War II
- Mineo Yoshikawa (吉川 峰夫, born 1947), Japanese basketball player
- Mineo Kato (加藤峰男, Katō Mineo, born 27 March 1934) is a Japanese former water polo player
- Mineo Fujita (born 1979), Japanese professional wrestler
- Mineo Maya (魔夜峰央, Mineo Maya), Japanese manga artist born in 1953
- Mineo Katagiri (1919 – 2005), Japanese-American social activist for racial equality, and a minister for the United Church of Christ
- Mineo Higashi (born 1938), Japanese writer
- Mineo Kaneda Mineo Kaneda (金田 峰生, born 1965), Japanese politician

== See also ==
- Mineo (surname)
- Mineo (disambiguation)
