= Takae Itō =

Takae Itō may refer to:

- Takae Itō (Aichi Prefecture politician) (born 1975), Japanese politician
- Takae Itō (Hyōgo Prefecture politician) (born 1968), Japanese politician
