= Mineo (disambiguation) =

Mineo is a town and comune in Catania, Sicily, Italy.

Mineo may also refer to:

- Mineo (given name)
- Mineo (surname)
- Mineo (meteorite), a meteorite fallen near Mineo (Sicily, Italy)
- Agrippina of Mineo (d. 262AD), venerated as a virgin martyr in the Catholic Church
