= Yukako Hagiwara =

Japanese politician (1911–2007)

- 萩原 幽香子

Member of the House of Councillors
- In office 8 July 1968 – 7 July 1974
- Preceded by: Bunmon Nakano
- Succeeded by: Hiroko Yasutake
- Constituency: Hyōgo at-large

Personal details
- Born: 11 April 1911 Kanzaki, Hyōgo, Japan
- Died: 10 October 2007 (aged 96)
- Party: Democratic Socialist
- Education: Akashi Women's Normal School

Yukako Hagiwara (萩原 幽香子, Hagiwara Yukako; 11 April 1911 – 10 October 2007) was a Japanese politician who served one term as a Democratic Socialist Party member of the House of Councillors. Prior to her election, she had worked in primary and secondary education, serving as director of social education of the Hyogo Prefectural Board of Education and as principal of Ōhiro Elementary School.

== Early life and education ==
Yukako Hagiwara, a native of Hyōgo Prefecture, was born on 11 April 1911. She graduated from Akashi Women's Normal School in 1931. After graduating, she worked at an elementary and junior high school in Hyōgo Prefecture, and she served as principal of Ōhiro Elementary School and as director of social education of Hyōgo Prefectural Board of Education.

== Political career ==
Hagiwara joined the Democratic Socialist Party (DSP), and she served as the head of the Women's and Youth Bureau of the party's Hyogo Prefecture branch. In the 1968 Japanese House of Councillors election, she ran as a DSP candidate from the Hyōgo at-large district and was elected. However, she did not win re-election at the 1974 Japanese House of Councillors election, and her bid for election to the Hyōgo 4th district in the 1976 Japanese general election was also unsuccessful. In 1981, she was awarded the Order of the Precious Crown, Third Class.

== Personal life ==
Hagiwara was also a writer. Among her publications are Yukako (幽香子; 1975), Donaishimahyo (どないしまひょ; 1977; lit. 'What should we do?'), Otto yukite (夫逝きて; 1981; lit. 'My husband passed away'), Kurashi o tsudzuru (暮らしをつづる; 1983; lit. 'Writing about life'), Nozomashī oya to wa (のぞましい親とは; 1984; lit. 'What are desirable parents?'), and Toki ni wa nogiku no gotoku toki ni wa himawari no yō ni (時には野菊の如く時には向日葵のように; 1993; lit. 'Sometimes like a wild chrysanthemum, sometimes like a sunflower').

Hagiwara died on 10 October 2007 at the age of 96 due to acute respiratory failure. On the day of her death, she was promoted to Senior Fifth Rank.

== Publications ==
- Hagiwara, Yukako (1951). 十字架を背負うもの:婦人校長の手記. Kyōgaku Kenkyūsha.
- Hagiwara, Yukako (1960). 伸びゆく婦人. Mirume Shobō.
- Hagiwara, Yukako (1975). 幽香子:自叙伝. Yukako Hagiwara.
- Hagiwara, Yukako (1977). どないしまひょ:男と女・嫁姑の身上相談. Kobe Shimbun Publishing Center.
- Hagiwara, Yukako (1981). 続・自叙伝夫逝きて. Hagi Hoikuen.
- Hagiwara, Yukako (1983). Bun o kaku okāsan no kai (ed.). 暮らしをつづる:「おかあさん」の25年. Kobe Shimbun Publishing Center.
- Hagiwara, Yukako (1984). Bun o kaku okāsan no kai (ed.). 暮らしをつづる:「おかあさん」の25年 続. Kobe Shimbun Publishing Center.
- Hagiwara, Yukako (1984). のぞましい親とは. Fuji Social Education Center.
- Hagiwara, Yukako (1993). 時には野菊の如く時には向日葵のように. Yoshitake Insatsu.
