= Mineo Kaneda =

Japanese politician (born 1965)

- 金田 峰生

Member of the Hyogo Prefectural Assembly for Nishi Ward
- In office April 1999 – April 2003 Serving with Shuzo Ishihara, Yoshifumi Sugio
- Succeeded by: Hidetake Ishii

Personal details
- Born: 25 August 1965 (age 61) Kobe, Hyōgo Prefecture
- Party: Communist
- Education: Bachelor of Social Welfare
- Alma mater: Nihon Fukushi University

Mineo Kaneda (金田 峰生, Kaneda Mineo; born 25 August 1965) is a politician from Kobe, Hyōgo Prefecture, Japan who represents the Japanese Communist Party. He has served one term in the Hyogo Prefectural Assembly and contested several local and national elections.

== Early life and career ==
Kaneda was born in Kobe, Japan on 25 August 1965. After graduating high school he attended Nihon Fukushi University and completed a bachelor's degree in social welfare. After graduation he was employed at the Hyogo Medical Practitioners Association, where he was involved in getting cataract surgery added as a procedure covered by the prefecture's health insurance.

== Political career ==
Kaneda first developed an interest in politics when a charter bus carrying Nihon Fukushi University students plunged into the Sai River in January 1985, killing the two drivers, a teacher and 22 first-year students. The cause of the accident was determined as driver fatigue due to being overworked. Kaneda, who was also a first-year student at the time, felt anger at a society that prioritised profit over human life, and felt it necessary to value the dignity of human life.

In April 1999, Kaneda successfully contested the three-seat district of Nishi-ku in the Hyogo Prefectural Assembly as a candidate for the Japanese Communist Party. Whilst in the assembly he left his mark on the prefecture's healthcare system, identifying problems within the system for subsidising healthcare for the elderly, which the prefecture was in the process of reviewing at the time. He sought a second term in the April 2003 election, but finished fourth in the race for three seats, falling 3,647 votes behind fellow incumbent Yoshihide Sugio.

During his political career Kaneda has become the face of the Communist Party within Hyōgo Prefecture. He has contested a total of four prefectural assembly elections, two national House of Representatives elections and one gubernatorial election. He also contested the July 2013 House of Councillors election, where he finished fourth out of seven candidates in the Hyogo at-large district, having received 9.6% of the vote. Kanada will contest the district for a second time at the July 2016 election. A 2015 revision of the Public Officers Election Law has increased the representation of the Hyogo district from four to Councillors to six, meaning three will be elected in 2016, compared to two in 2013.
