= Mineo (surname) =

Mineo is an Italian surname. Notable people with the surname include:

- Alfred Mineo (1880–1930), American Mafia Godfather, leader of the family that became the Gambino crime family
- Andy Mineo (born 1988), American rapper
- Corradino Mineo (born 1950), Italian journalist and politician
- Gordon Mineo (1945–2006), Top Fuel Funny Car driver
- Kyosuke Mineo (born 1974), Japanese racing driver
- Manfredi Mineo (1880 – 1930), Italian American mobster
- Mike Mineo, American singer-songwriter and multi-instrumentalist
- Nicolò Mineo (1934 – 2023), Italian literary critic, literary historian and philologist
- Sal Mineo (1939–1976), American film and stage actor
- Settimo Mineo (born 1938), Italian mobster
- Ted Mineo (born 1981), American artist

== Fictional characters ==
- Joseph Mineo, fictional character on the HBO drama Oz

== See also ==
- Mineo (given name)
- Mineo (disambiguation)
