= Yoshitada Konoike =

Japanese politician (1940–2018)

- 鴻池 祥肇
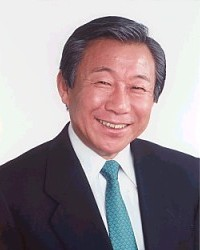
- Official portrait, 2002

Deputy Chief Cabinet Secretary (Political affairs, House of Councillors)
- In office 24 September 2008 – 13 May 2009
- Prime Minister: Tarō Asō
- Preceded by: Mitsuhide Iwaki
- Succeeded by: Katsuhito Asano

Member of the House of Councillors
- In office 23 July 1995 – 25 December 2018
- Preceded by: Nanryō Kyokudō IV
- Succeeded by: Hiroyuki Kada
- Constituency: Hyōgo at-large

Member of the House of Representatives
- In office 6 July 1986 – 18 June 1993
- Preceded by: Yōko Fujiki
- Succeeded by: Yuriko Koike
- Constituency: Hyōgo 2nd

Personal details
- Born: 28 November 1940 Amagasaki, Hyōgo, Japan
- Died: 25 December 2018 (aged 78) Tokyo, Japan
- Party: Liberal Democratic
- Education: Waseda University

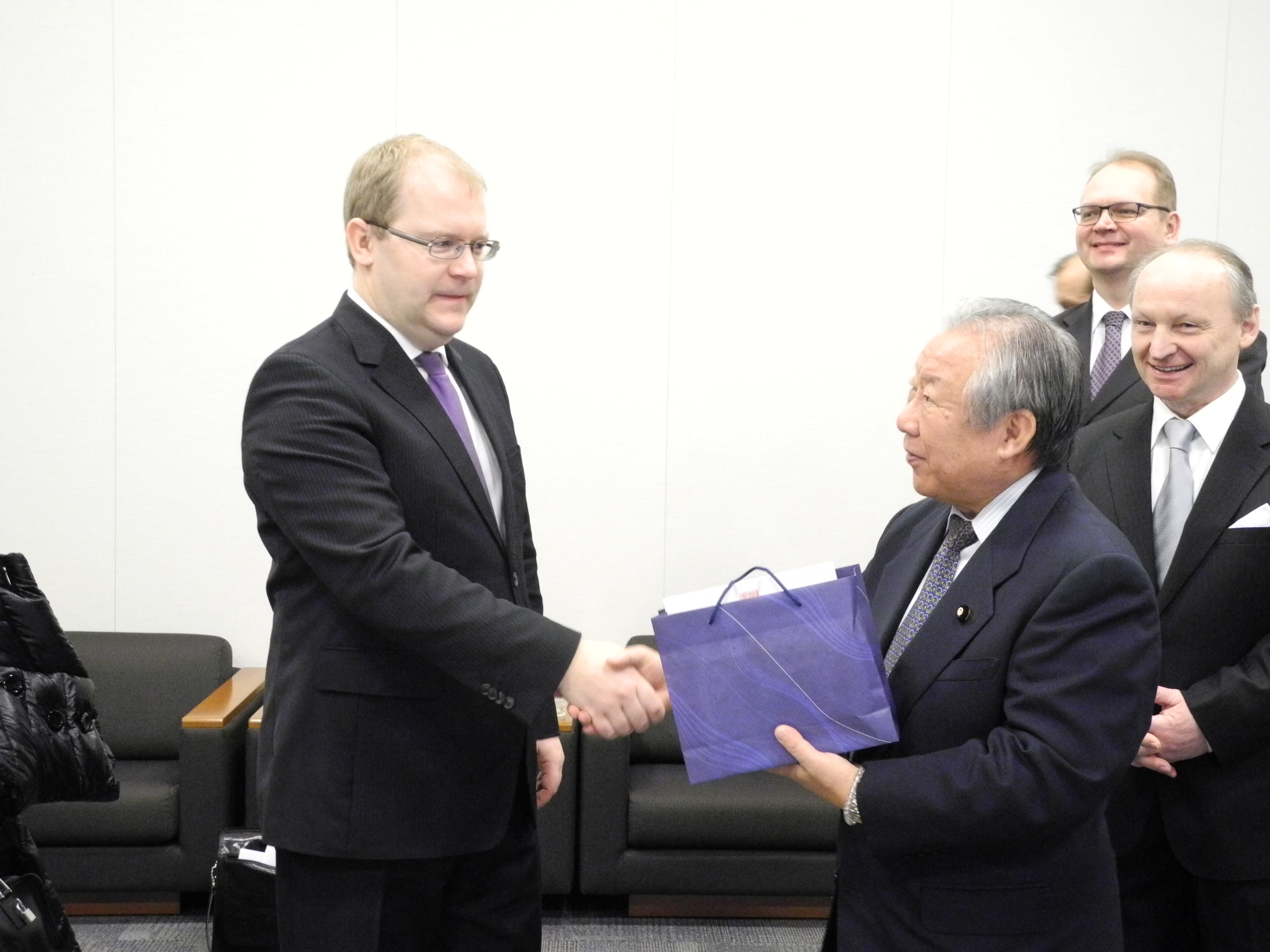
Urmas Paet and Yoshitada Konoike in 2014

Yoshitada Konoike (鴻池 祥肇, Konoike Yoshitada; November 28, 1940 – December 25, 2018) was a Japanese politician of the Liberal Democratic Party and member of the House of Councillors in the Diet (national legislature), formerly Minister of State for Disaster Management. A native of Amagasaki, Hyōgo and graduate of Waseda University, he was elected to the House of Representatives for the first time in 1986 after an unsuccessful run in 1983. After losing his seat in 1993, he was elected to the House of Councillors for the first time in 1995 and is currently serving his fourth 6-year term.

== Career ==
In July 2003 Konoike caused controversy when he commented on an ongoing murder case, saying that the parents of the accused "should be paraded through the city and decapitated". He apologized for the comments but one week later he commented on a different case, in which four child sex slaves escaped from the house of a dead captor, saying "we don't know if the girls are victims or assailants", and added, "if you're arguing the girls were bought as slaves, you assume they have no responsibility". Konoike's comments were seen as problematic as he was serving as deputy head of a government department set up to address the issue of youth crime and unemployment at the time, which led Prime Minister Junichiro Koizumi to make a public statement that any further such comments would not be tolerated. In 2007, when asked to comment on an unrelated murder case, he said, that "they should be paraded through the ci... no, I'm not allowed to say that, am I?"

Konoike was removed from his post as deputy chief cabinet secretary on May 13, 2009, and was admitted to a mental hospital after the weekly magazine Shukan Shincho revealed that he had used his government shinkansen free pass to travel to Atami to spend several days with a mistress. He was also expelled from the Hyōgo branch of the party, but was subsequently readmitted to the party on 30 August 2010.

Konoike was elected to the House of Councillors for his fourth consecutive term in the July 2013 election and unsuccessfully contested the ballot to replace Hirofumi Nakasone as the LDP's leader in the house. He lost the ballot to Kensei Mizote 82–31.

He died on 25 December 2018 at the age of 78.
