= Shunichi Mizuoka =

Japanese politician

- 水岡 俊一
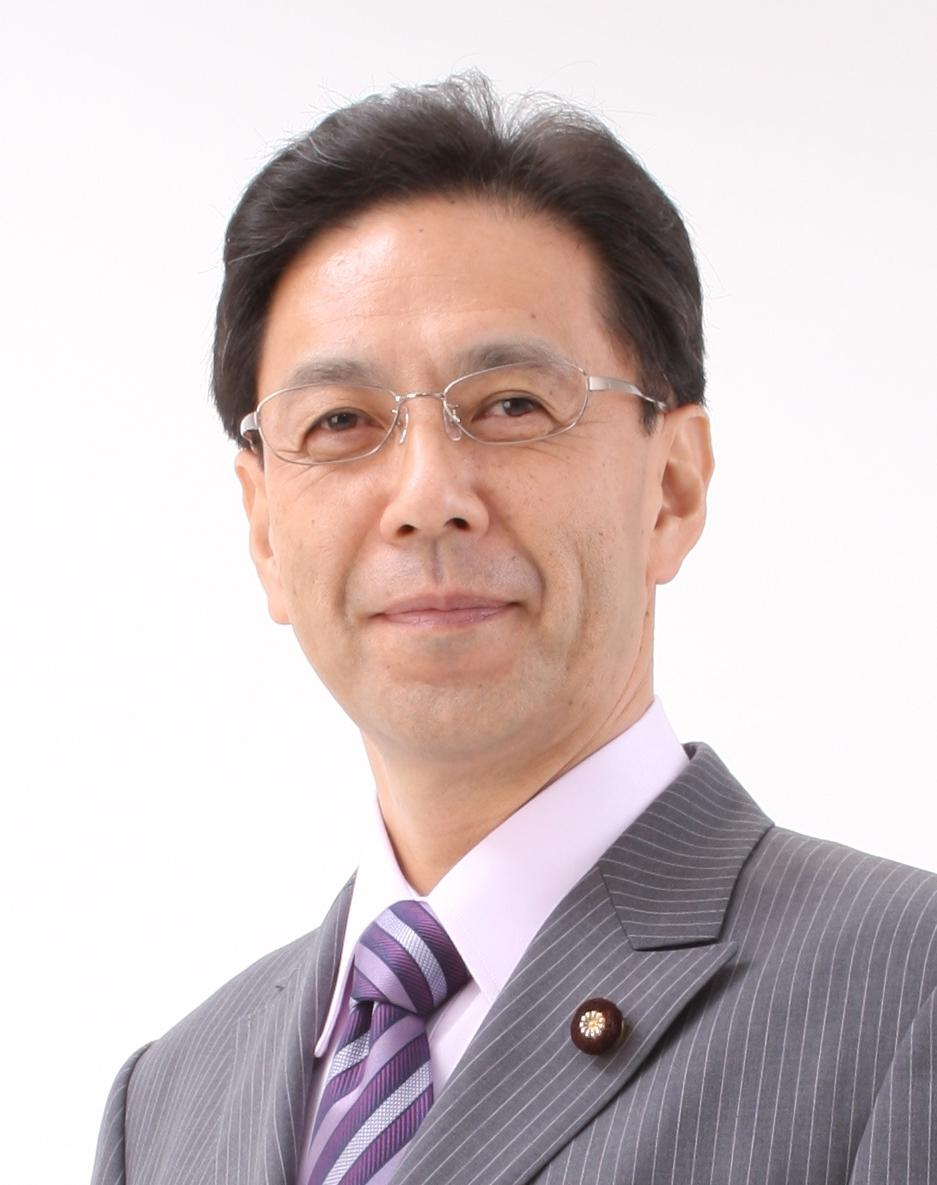
- Official portrait, 2011

President of the Constitutional Democratic Party
- Incumbent
- Assumed office 19 January 2026 (Note: Acting: 19–23 January 2026)
- Deputy: Masayo Tanabu
- Preceded by: Yoshihiko Noda

Special Advisor to the Prime Minister (Political and Parliamentary Affairs)
- In office 2 September 2011 – 1 October 2012
- Prime Minister: Yoshihiko Noda

Member of the House of Councillors
- Incumbent
- Assumed office 29 July 2019
- Constituency: National PR
- In office 26 July 2004 – 25 July 2016
- Preceded by: Shōji Motooka
- Succeeded by: Takae Itō
- Constituency: Hyōgo at-large

Personal details
- Born: 13 June 1956 (age 70) Takeno, Hyōgo, Japan
- Party: CDP (since 2018)
- Other political affiliations: DPJ (2004–2016); DP (2016–2018)
- Education: Nara University of Education

Shunichi Mizuoka (水岡 俊一, Mizuoka Shun'ichi; born June 13, 1956) is a Japanese politician of the Constitutional Democratic Party of Japan, a former member of the House of Councillors in the Diet (national legislature).

== Early life ==
A native of Takeno, Hyogo, Mizuoka graduated from Nara University of Education.

== Political career ==
Mizuoka was elected to represent the Hyogo at-large district in 2004 and was re-elected in 2010. He lost his seat in 2016, but was reelected in 2019, and is still currently serving in the House of Councillors as of early 2025.

== Cabinet positions ==
Mizuoka served as an assistant to the Prime Minister in the Noda Cabinet from 2011 to 2012.
