= Daisuke Katayama =

Japanese politician

- 片山 大介
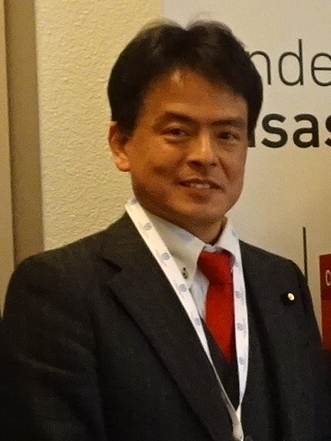
- Katayama in 2018

Member of the House of Councillors
- Incumbent
- Assumed office 26 July 2016
- Preceded by: Seat established
- Constituency: Hyōgo at-large

Personal details
- Born: 6 October 1966 (age 59) Kasaoka, Okayama, Japan
- Party: Innovation
- Parent: Toranosuke Katayama (father)
- Education: Keio University (BEng); Waseda University (MPM)

Daisuke Katayama (born 6 October 1966) is a Japanese politician who is a member of the House of Councillors of Japan.

== Biography ==
Katayama was born in Kasaoka, Okayama Prefecture, Japan. He is the son of former Member of the House of Councillors Toranosuke Katayama, who previously served as Minister for Internal Affairs and Communications under Prime Ministers Yoshirō Mori and Junichiro Koizumi and President of Nippon Ishin no Kai alongside Ichirō Matsui. He graduated from Funabashi Elementary School and Funabashi Junior High School in Setagaya, Tokyo and Aoyama Senior High School in Shibuya, Tokyo, and later graduated from Keio University in 1992 and Waseda University in 2012.
