= Yasuhiro Tsuji =

Japanese politician

- 辻 泰弘
- Official portrait, 2011

Member of the House of Councillors
- In office 29 July 2001 – 28 July 2013
- Preceded by: Ichiji Ishii
- Succeeded by: Takayuki Shimizu
- Constituency: Hyōgo at-large

Personal details
- Born: 27 December 1955 (age 70) Higashinada, Kobe, Japan
- Party: Democratic (2000–2013)
- Other political affiliations: DSP (1978–1994)
- Education: University of Tokyo

Tsuji Yasuhiro (Japanese: 辻 泰弘), born 1955, is a former Japanese politician of the Democratic Party of Japan.

== Early life ==
Tsuji is a native of Kobe, Hyogo. He graduated from the University of Tokyo and studied at Johns Hopkins University.

== Political career ==
Tsuji served two terms in the House of Councillors in the National Diet, representing the Hyogo at-large district.

He was elected to the House of Councillors for the first time in 2001 after making three unsuccessful runs for the House of Representatives in 1986, 1990 and 2000. He sought a third term at the July 2013 election but was defeated by Japan Restoration Party candidate Takayuki Shimizu.

== Sources ==
- 政治家情報 〜辻 泰弘〜 [Politician Information – Yasuhiro Tsuji]. Za Senkyo (ザ･選挙, The Election) (in Japanese). JANJAN.
