= Hyōgo at-large district =

Japan House of Councillors constituency

- 兵庫県選挙区
- Parliamentary constituency for the House of Councillors
- Prefecture: Hyōgo
- Electorate: 4,564,897 (as of September 2022)

Current constituency
- Created: 1947
- Seats: 6
- Councillors: Class of 2019: Takayuki Shimizu (Ishin); Mitsuo Takahashi (Komeito); Hiroyuki Kada (LDP); Class of 2022: Daisuke Katayama (Ishin); Shinsuke Suematsu (LDP); Takae Itō (Komeito)

The Hyogo at-large district (Japanese: 兵庫県選挙区, Hepburn: Hyōgo-ken senkyoku) is a constituency that represents Hyogo Prefecture in the House of Councillors in the Diet of Japan. It used to have five Councillors in the 242-member house, but this representation increased to six by July 2019.

== Outline ==
The constituency represents the entire Hyogo Prefecture, which includes the urban centres of Kobe and the Hanshin region, as well as the rural areas to the north and west of the prefecture and Awaji Island. The district has 4,644,254 registered voters as of June 2016, the eighth-highest in the country. The Councillors currently representing Hyogo are:

- Shinsuke Suematsu (Liberal Democratic Party (LDP); term ends in 2016)
- Shunichi Mizuoka (Democratic Party; term ends in 2016)
- Yoshitada Konoike (LDP; term ends in 2019)
- Takayuki Shimizu (elected as a Japan Restoration Party candidate, currently belongs to Initiatives from Osaka; term ends in 2019)

== Representation in the House ==
From the first House of Councillors election in 1947 until the 1992 election, Hyogo elected six Councillors in two sets of three at elections held every three years. Under 1994 electoral reform Hyogo's representation was reduced to four (two sets of two), which took effect from the 1995 election. Twenty years later, the district had the same level of representation as not only the Hokkaido and Fukuoka districts, which also had more than 4 million voters each, but also the Niigata, Miyagi and Nagano districts, which each had less than 2 million voters. To address this malapportionment in representation, a 2015 revision of the Public Officers Election Law increased the representation of the Hyogo, Hokkaido and Fukuoka districts to six Councillors; this change began to take effect at the July 2016 election, at which three Councillors were elected by the district for the first time since 1992. The district's representation will return to six Councillors at the next election, due by July 2019. At the same time, the Niigata, Miyagi and Nagano districts will be reduced to two Councillors.

== 2016 election ==
=== Candidates ===
The list of candidates for the election on 10 July 2016 was officially released on 22 June 2016. During the nomination period, the opposition Democratic, Communist, Social Democratic and People's Life parties formed an agreement to field only one joint candidate in districts where only one seat is contested. In Hyogo, which will elect three Councillors for the first time since 1992, a total of seven candidates have nominated, including both incumbents Suematsu and Mizuoka. Komeito, the LDP's junior coalition partner, nominated a candidate for the first time since 1992, after having refrained from competing against the LDP during the period that only two seats were contested. Former Hyogo Prefectural Assembly member Mineo Kaneda will contest the district for the Communist Party for the second time, after having come fourth in the 2013 election. Initiatives from Osaka nominated Daisuke Katayama, a former NHK journalist from Okayama.

Candidates
Happiness Realization	Yuko Minato	
Liberal Democratic	Shinsuke Suematsu (Incumbent)	
Democratic	Shunichi Mizuoka (Incumbent)	
Communist	Mineo Kaneda	
Komeito	Takae Itō	Endorsed by the Liberal Democratic Party
Initiatives from Osaka	Daisuke Katayama	
Party for Japanese Kokoro	Junnosuke Shimoie	

=== Results ===
The coalition government's candidates saw a large swing in their favour, with Suematsu and Ito receiving a combined 48.5% of the vote. Mizuoka was unable to win a third term; he was defeated by Katayama by a margin of 4.6%, leaving the Democratic Party without representation in the district. It was one of 13 seats the party lost nationwide in a strong victory for the ruling coalition. Katayama was one of seven successful Initiatives from Osaka candidates. Voter turnout at the election was 53.74%, an increase of 0.72% from the previous election but slightly below the national average of 54.70%, which had also improved slightly from 2013.

Voters in the election also submitted a second ballot for the nationwide 48-seat proportional district. The LDP received 31.7% of the vote, which was below their national result of 35.9%. Initiatives from Osaka received 19.5% of the vote in Hyogo, more than double their nationwide average. The high level of support in Hyogo and Osaka won the party 4 of the 48 seats. The Democratic (15.8%), Komieto (15.3%) and Communist (10.3%) parties were the other parties to receive more than two percent of the vote.

2016
Party	Candidate	Votes	%	±%
LDP	Shinsuke Suematsu (Incumbent)	641,910	26.3	
Komeito	Takae Itō (Endorsed by LDP)	542,090	22.2	
Ishin	Daisuke Katayama	531,165	21.8	
Democratic	Shunichi Mizuoka (Incumbent)	420,068	17.2	
JCP	Mineo Kaneda	228,811	9.4	
Happiness Realization	Yūko Minato	49,913	2.0	
Japanese Kokoro	Junnosuke Shimoie	23,954	1.0	
Total valid votes		2,437,911	97.95	
Informal votes		50,899	2.05	
Turnout		2,488,871	53.74	+0.72

2025
Party	Candidate	Votes	%	±%
Independent	Fusaho Izumi (Endorsed by CDP Hyogo Prefecture Federation)			
Komeito	Mitsuo Takahashi (Endorsed by the LDP)			
LDP	Hiroyuki Kada (Incumbent)			
Ishin	Toshitaka Yoshihira			
Sanseito	Seiya Fujiwara			
DPP	Hitomi Tada			
Anti-NHK	Takashi Tachibana			
JCP	Mineo Kaneda			
Reiwa	Akemi Yonemura			
Team Mirai	Misa Maeda			
Mushozoku Rengō	Hideaki Takahashi			
Social Democratic	Fumio Kishi			
Nippon Seishinkai	Kengo Uraki			
Turnout		4,479,072	60.47	+8.85

== Previously elected councillors ==
class of 1947			election year	class of 1950		
#1 (1947: #1, 6-year term)	#2 (1947: #2, 6-year term)	#3 (1947: #3, 6-year term)	election year	#1 (1947: #4, 3-year term)	#2 (1947: #5, 3-year term)	#3 (1947: #6, 3-year term)
Chūjirō Haraguchi (Social Democratic) (Note: Resigned 29 November 1949)	Kōkichi Yagi (Ind.) (Note: Was disqualified from holding office by the post-war Allied occupying forces on 27 May 1947)	Shinji Fujimori (Democrats' Club)	1947	Masao Akagi (Democrats' Club)	Masagorō Taguchi (Democratic)	Tetsuo Kobata (Democratic)
Chūjirō Haraguchi (Social Democratic)	Vacant (27 May 1947 - 2 June 1949)	Shinji Fujimori (Democrats' Club)	-	Masao Akagi (Democrats' Club)	Masagorō Taguchi (Democratic)	Tetsuo Kobata (Democratic)
Chūjirō Haraguchi (Social Democratic)	Shigemi Yokoo (Dem. Liberal)	Shinji Fujimori (Democrats' Club)	1949 by-election (Note: Held 3 June 1949.)	Masao Akagi (Democrats' Club)	Masagorō Taguchi (Democratic)	Tetsuo Kobata (Democratic)
Shinichi Okazaki (Dem. Lib.)	Shigemi Yokoo (Dem. Liberal)	Shinji Fujimori (Democrats' Club)	1950 by-election (Note: Held 12 January 1950)	Masao Akagi (Democrats' Club)	Masagorō Taguchi (Democratic)	Tetsuo Kobata (Democratic)
Shinichi Okazaki (Dem. Lib.)	Shigemi Yokoo (Dem. Liberal)	Shinji Fujimori (Democrats' Club)	1950	Masao Akagi (Ryokufūkai)	Seiichi Matsuura (Social Democratic)	Katsumi Yamagata (Liberal)
Shinichi Okazaki (Liberal)	Kenjin Matsuzawa (Right Socialist)	Giichi Kawai (Left Socialist)	1953	Masao Akagi (Ryokufūkai)	Seiichi Matsuura (Social Democratic)	Katsumi Yamagata (Liberal)
Shinichi Okazaki (Liberal)	Kenjin Matsuzawa (Right Socialist)	Giichi Kawai (Left Socialist)	1956	Ichiro Narita (LDP) (Note: Died in office on 4 July 1959)	Seiichi Matsuura (Social Democratic)	Bunmon Nakano (LDP)
Shinichi Okazaki (LDP)	Kenjin Matsuzawa (Social Democratic)	Gentarō Aota (LDP)	1959	Ichiro Narita (LDP)	Seiichi Matsuura (Social Democratic)	Bunmon Nakano (LDP)
Shinichi Okazaki (LDP)	Kenjin Matsuzawa (Social Democratic)	Gentarō Aota (LDP)	(Note: Held 20 August 1959)1959 by-election	Sachio Kishida (LDP)	Seiichi Matsuura (Social Democratic)	Bunmon Nakano (LDP)
Shinichi Okazaki (LDP)	Kenjin Matsuzawa (Social Democratic)	Gentarō Aota (LDP)	1962	Sachio Kishida (LDP)	Yoshio Sano (Social Democratic) (Note: Died in office on 27 September 1972)	Bunmon Nakano (LDP)
Itoko Nakazawa (Dem. Socialist)	Kenjin Matsuzawa (Social Democratic)	Gentarō Aota (LDP)	1965	Sachio Kishida (LDP)	Yoshio Sano (Social Democratic)	Bunmon Nakano (LDP)
Itoko Nakazawa (Dem. Socialist)	Kenjin Matsuzawa (Social Democratic)	Gentarō Aota (LDP)	1968	Tōru Asai (Kōmeitō)	Yoshio Sano (Social Democratic)	Yukako Hagiwara (Dem. Socialist)
Itoko Nakazawa (Dem. Socialist)	Mamoru Kotani (Social Democratic)	Motohiko Kanai (LDP)	1971	Tōru Asai (Kōmeitō)	Yoshio Sano (Social Democratic)	Yukako Hagiwara (Dem. Socialist)
Itoko Nakazawa (Dem. Socialist)	Mamoru Kotani (Social Democratic)	Motohiko Kanai (LDP)	(Note: Held 5 November 1972)1972 by-election	Tōru Asai (Kōmeitō)	Ichiro Nakanishi (LDP)	Yukako Hagiwara (Dem. Socialist)
Itoko Nakazawa (Dem. Socialist)	Mamoru Kotani (Social Democratic)	Motohiko Kanai (LDP)	1974	Hideo Yahara (Kōmeitō)	Ichiro Nakanishi (LDP)	Hiroko Yasutake (Communist)
Michiko Watanabe (Kōmeitō)	Mamoru Kotani (Social Democratic)	Motohiko Kanai (LDP)	1977	Hideo Yahara (Kōmeitō)	Ichiro Nakanishi (LDP)	Hiroko Yasutake (Communist)
Michiko Watanabe (Kōmeitō)	Mamoru Kotani (Social Democratic)	Motohiko Kanai (LDP)	1980	Shōji Motooka (Social Democratic)	Ichiro Nakanishi (LDP)	Hiroko Yasutake (Communist)
Hideo Yahara (Kōmeitō)	Eiko Nukiyama (Dem. Socialist)	Ichiji Ishii (LDP)	1983	Shōji Motooka (Social Democratic)	Ichiro Nakanishi (LDP)	Hiroko Yasutake (Communist)
Hideo Yahara (Kōmeitō)	Eiko Nukiyama (Dem. Socialist)	Ichiji Ishii (LDP)	1986	Shōji Motooka (Social Democratic)	Ichiro Nakanishi (LDP)	Kōjin Katakami (Kōmeitō)
Hideo Yahara (Kōmeitō)	Yasuo Nishino (Social Democratic)	Ichiji Ishii (LDP)	1989	Shōji Motooka (Social Democratic)	Ichiro Nakanishi (LDP)	Kōjin Katakami (Kōmeitō)
Hideo Yahara (Kōmeitō)	Yasuo Nishino (Social Democratic)	Ichiji Ishii (LDP)	1992	Shōji Motooka (Social Democratic)	Saburo Komoto (LDP) (Note: Resigned on 8 October 1996 to contest the October 1996 House of Representatives election)	Kōjin Katakami (Kōmeitō)
Seat abolished (Note: The number of seats was reduced from six to four by electing one less Councillor in the 1996 and 1999 elections. The number of seats will return to six at the 2019 election.)	Yoshitada Konoike (LDP)	Ichiji Ishii (New Frontier)	1995	Shōji Motooka (Social Democratic)	Saburo Komoto (LDP)	Kōjin Katakami (Kōmeitō)
Seat abolished	Yoshitada Konoike (LDP)	Ichiji Ishii (New Frontier)	(Note: Held 17 November 1996)1996 by-election	Shōji Motooka (Social Democratic)	Chōji Ashio (minor party) (Note: Contested the election under the party name Hyogo's Party to Broaden Tomorrow's Japan (明日の日本をひらく兵庫の会, Ashita no Nihon o Hiraku Hyogo no Kai). He joined the LDP the year after his election.)	Kōjin Katakami (Kōmeitō)
Seat abolished	Yoshitada Konoike (LDP)	Ichiji Ishii (New Frontier)	1998	Shōji Motooka (Social Democratic)	Tatsumi Osawa (Communist)	Seat abolished
Seat abolished	Yoshitada Konoike (LDP)	Yasuhiro Tsuji (DPJ)	2001	Shōji Motooka (Social Democratic)	Tatsumi Osawa (Communist)	Seat abolished
Seat abolished	Yoshitada Konoike (LDP)	Yasuhiro Tsuji (DPJ)	2004	Shinsuke Suematsu (LDP)	Shunichi Mizuoka (DPJ)	Seat abolished
Seat abolished	Yoshitada Konoike (LDP)	Yasuhiro Tsuji (DPJ)	2007	Shinsuke Suematsu (LDP)	Shunichi Mizuoka (DPJ)	Seat abolished
Seat abolished	Yoshitada Konoike (LDP)	Yasuhiro Tsuji (DPJ)	2010	Shinsuke Suematsu (LDP)	Shunichi Mizuoka (DPJ)	Seat abolished
Seat abolished	Yoshitada Konoike (LDP)	Takayuki Shimizu (Restoration)	2013	Shinsuke Suematsu (LDP)	Shunichi Mizuoka (DPJ)	Seat abolished
Seat abolished	Yoshitada Konoike (LDP)	Takayuki Shimizu (Restoration)	2016	Shinsuke Suematsu (LDP)	Takae Itō (Kōmeitō)	Daisuke Katayama (Initiatives from Osaka)
Seat restored			2019	Shinsuke Suematsu (LDP)	Takae Itō (Kōmeitō)	Daisuke Katayama (Initiatives from Osaka)

== Previous election results ==
2013
Party	Candidate	Votes	%	±%
LDP	Yoshitada Konoike (Incumbent) (endorsed by Komeito)	868,069	37.8	
Restoration	Takayuki Shimizu	598,630	26.1	
Democratic	Yasuhiro Tsuji (Incumbent)	343,551	15.0	
JCP	Mineo Kaneda	220,577	9.6	
Your	Eriko Shimomura	174,132	7.6	
Greens	Namiho Matsumoto	58,032	2.5	
Happiness Realization	Yūko Minato	34,827	1.5	
Turnout		4,545,807	53.02	−1.39

2010
Party	Candidate	Votes	%	±%
LDP	Shinsuke Suematsu (Incumbent)	694,459	29.4	
Democratic	Shunichi Mizuoka (Incumbent) (Endorsed by People's New Party)	515,541	21.8	
Your	Nobuhiko Isaka	414,910	17.6	
Democratic	Maki Mihashi (Endorsed by People's New Party)	409,190	17.3	
JCP	Terufumi Horiuchi	199,052	8.4	
New Renaissance	Aimi Yoshida	107,028	4.5	
Happiness Realization	Yoshiaki Takagi	20,651	0.9	
Turnout				

== See also ==
- List of districts of the House of Councillors of Japan

Hyogo Prefecture districts for the House of Representatives:

- Hyogo 1st district
- Hyogo 2nd district
- Hyogo 8th district
- Hyogo 11th district
