= Hiroko Yasutake =

Japanese politician (1928–2019)

- 安武 洋子

Member of the House of Councillors
- In office 8 July 1974 – 7 July 1986
- Preceded by: Yukako Hagiwara
- Succeeded by: Kōjin Katakami
- Constituency: Hyōgo at-large

Personal details
- Born: 26 July 1928 Kobe, Hyōgo, Japan
- Died: 8 August 2019 (aged 91) Akashi, Hyōgo, Japan
- Party: Communist

Hiroko Yasutake (安武 洋子, Yasutake Hiroko; 26 July 1928 – 8 August 2019) was a Japanese politician. Originally a public servant in Akashi, Hyōgo, she became active as a prefectural and regional trade union branch leader and a member of the Japanese Communist Party Central Committee, before serving in the House of Councillors for the Hyōgo at-large district from 1974 until 1986.

== Biography ==
Yasutake, a native of Kobe, was born on 26 July 1928. After graduating at the Hyogo Prefectural Second Kobe Girls' High (now Hyogo Prefectural Yumenodai High School) in 1945, she was hired by the Public Employment Security Office of Akashi, Hyōgo, in 1950.

While working as a public servant, she became active in trade unionism, becoming head of women of the Hyogo branches of Sōhyō and of the Hyogo and Kinki branches of the Zenroren. She was also engaged in the nuclear disarmament movement, as vice-president of the Akashi chapter of the Japan Council against Atomic and Hydrogen Bombs. She was a member of the Japanese Communist Party, at one point serving as a member of its Central Committee; in September 1997, she was promoted to Honorary Executive Committee Member.

She ran for the Hyōgo at-large district as her party's candidate in the 1974 Japanese House of Councillors election, and she was elected. She was re-elected to the same district at the 1980 Japanese House of Councillors election. She was unseated from the seat at the 1986 and she was defeated at the 1989 Japanese House of Councillors elections while running for the same at-large district.

Outside of politics, she was active as a tanka poet, authoring a collection of poems called Rokkō no Fumoto de (六甲のふもとで).

She died of lung cancer on 8 August 2019 in Akashi, Hyōgo.
