= Masakazu Yoshioka =

Japanese footballer (born 1995)

Personal information
- Full name: Masakazu Yoshioka
- Date of birth: March 9, 1995 (age 31)
- Place of birth: Nagasaki, Japan
- Height: 1.63 m (5 ft 4 in)
- Position: Midfielder

Team information
- Current team: Blaublitz Akita
- Number: 16

Youth career
- –2009: FC Unzen Estieall
- 2010–2012: Nagasaki IAS High School

College career
Years	Team	Apps	(Gls)
2013–2016	Komazawa University		

Senior career*
Years	Team	Apps	(Gls)
2017–2020	V-Varen Nagasaki	63	(7)
2018	→ Kataller Toyama (loan)	3	(0)
2021	Avispa Fukuoka	9	(1)
2022–2024	Renofa Yamaguchi	93	(2)
2025–	Blaublitz Akita	43	(3)
- * Club domestic league appearances and goals as of 14 August 2026

Masakazu Yoshioka (吉岡 雅和, Yoshioka Masakazu; born March 9, 1995) is a Japanese football player who plays for Blaublitz Akita.

== University career ==
During the 90th Kanto University Soccer League, he was selected as part of the Best XI.

== Career ==
=== V-Varen Nagasaki ===
Masakazu Yoshioka joined J2 League club V-Varen Nagasaki in 2017. He made his league debut against Thespa Gunma on 26 February 2017. Yoshioka scored his first league goal against Renofa Yamaguchi on 15 October 2017, scoring in the 79th minute.

=== Loan to Kataller Toyama ===
On 19 June 2018, Yoshioka was announced at Kataller Toyama on loan. He made his league debut against Nagano Parceiro on 21 October 2018.

=== Avispa Fukuoka ===
On 12 January 2021, Yoshioka was announced at Avispa Fukuoka. He made his league debut against Yokohama F. Marinos on 10 March 2021. Yoshioka scored his first league goal against Cerezo Osaka on 10 April 2021, scoring in the 67th minute.

=== Renofa Yamaguchi ===
On 23 December 2021, Yoshioka was announced at Renofa Yamaguchi. He made his league debut against Roasso Kumamoto on 20 February 2022. On 21 November 2022, Yoshioka's contract with the club was extended for the 2023 season. He scored his first league goal against Zweigen Kanazawa on 19 March 2023, scoring in the 21st minute. On 21 December 2023, Yoshioka's contract with the club was extended for the 2024 season.

=== Blaublitz Akita ===
On 28 December 2024, Yoshioka was announced at Blaublitz Akita.
