= Takae Itō (Hyōgo Prefecture politician) =

Japanese politician

- 伊藤 孝江
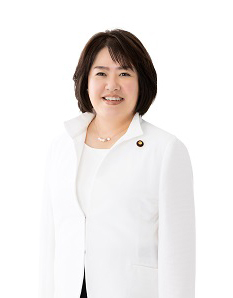
- Official portrait, 2022

Member of the House of Councillors
- Incumbent
- Assumed office 26 July 2016
- Preceded by: Shunichi Mizuoka
- Constituency: Hyōgo at-large

Personal details
- Born: 13 January 1968 (age 58) Amagasaki, Hyōgo, Japan
- Party: Komeito
- Education: Kansai University

Takae Itō (born January 13, 1968, in Hyōgo Prefecture, Japan) is a Japanese politician who has served as a member of the House of Councillors of Japan since 2016. She represents the Hyogo at-large district and is a member of the Komeito party.
