= Takayuki Shimizu (politician) =

Japanese politician

- 清水 貴之
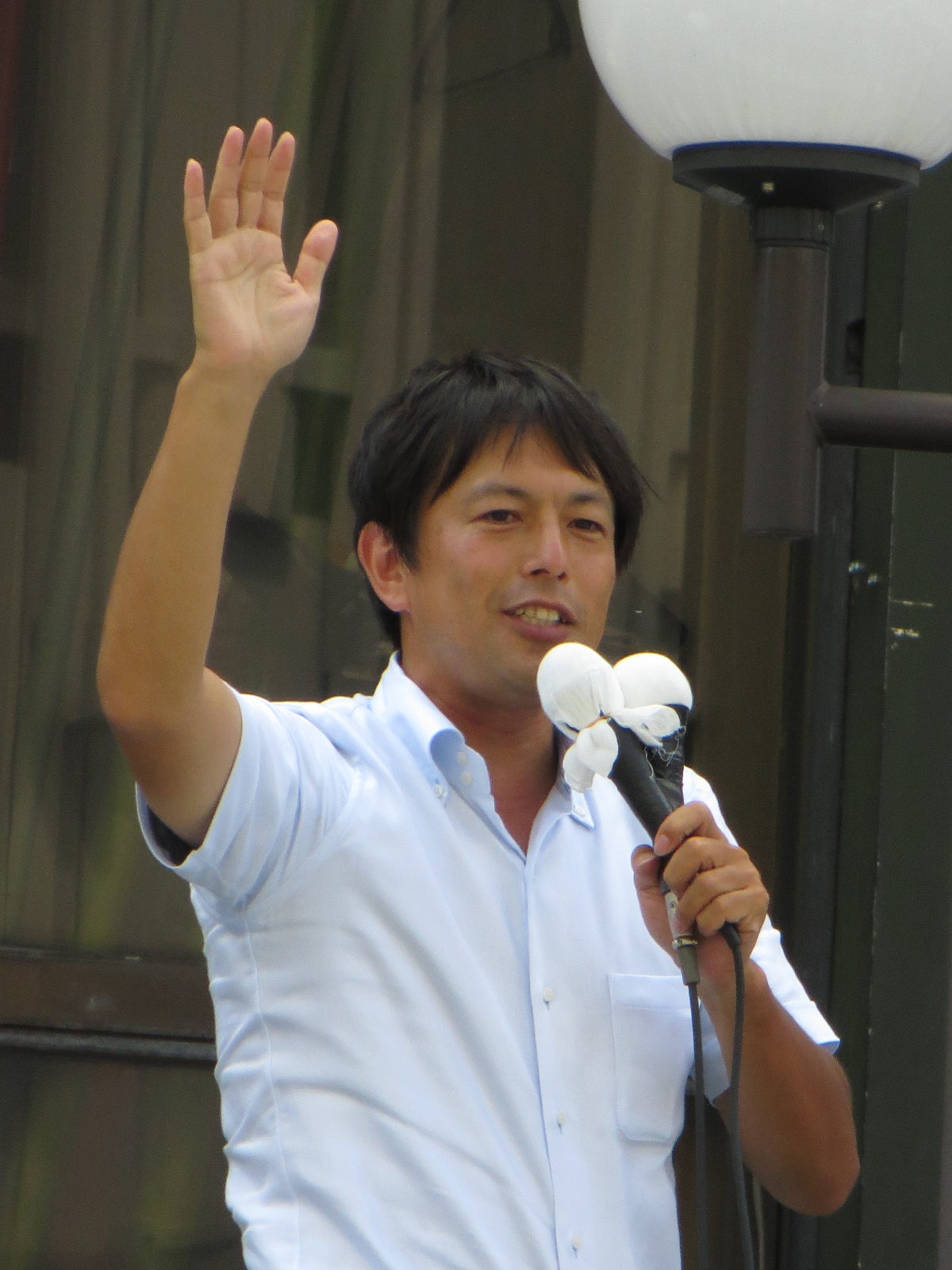
- Shimizu in 2013

Member of the House of Councillors
- In office 29 July 2013 – 31 October 2024
- Preceded by: Yasuhiro Tsuji
- Succeeded by: Fusaho Izumi
- Constituency: Hyōgo at-large

Personal details
- Born: 29 June 1974 (age 52) Chikushino, Fukuoka, Japan
- Party: Independent (since 2024)
- Other political affiliations: JRP (2012–2014); JIP 2014 (2014–2015); JIP 2015 (2015–2024)
- Education: Waseda University; Kwansei Gakuin University

Takayuki Shimizu (清水 貴之, Shimizu Takayuki; born 29 June 1974) is a Japanese television announcer and politician of the Initiatives from Osaka party. He is serving his first term as a member of the House of Councillors in the National Diet, representing the Hyogo at-large district.

== Early life and education ==
Shimizu was born in Chikushino, Fukuoka Prefecture and was raised in Matsudo, Chiba Prefecture, graduating from the city's Negiuchi Junior High School. He then attended the Kashiwa High School attached to the Shibaura Institute of Technology. Shimizu gained entry to Waseda University and graduated with a Bachelor of Education degree in 1999. He later attended the graduate school of Kwansei Gakuin University, completing a Master of Business Administration in 2004.

== Television career ==
After graduating from Waseda, Shimizu joined the Asahi Broadcasting Corporation as a television announcer, where he was employed for nine years. During this time he featured as the main presenter of the station's early-morning Ohayō Asahi Cōru (Asahi Morning Call) that was broadcast in the Kansai region. From 2006 until March 2010 he also appeared on Asahi radio's Tuesday afternoon program alongside Mieko Kaminuma. In 2010 Shimizu left Asahi to become a freelance announcer, during which time his work included reporting from areas damaged by the March 2011 Tohoku earthquake and tsunami.

== Political career ==
Shimizu first entered politics as the Japan Restoration Party candidate in the Hyogo 4th district at the December 2012 general election, with an endorsement from Your Party. Shimizu received more votes than the incumbent member Shoichi Takahashi of the Democratic Party of Japan, but finished second behind Liberal Democratic Party candidate Hisayuki Fujii, losing by 25,637 votes. In the Kinki proportional representation block, the Restoration Party received 30.8% of the vote, entitling them to ten of the block's 29 seats. However, Shimizu's relatively large margin of defeat in his district meant he finished twelfth amongst his party's candidates and missed out on a seat in the House of Representatives.

Shimizu then turned his attention to the House of Councillors election scheduled for July 2013. He contested the two-member Hyogo at-large district for the Restoration Party and finished second in the vote, defeating Democratic Party incumbent Yasuhiro Tsuji by more than 11%. During his first term in the House of Councillors, Shimizu's role has included serving on the House's audit committee, economy and industry committee, and the special committee on the abduction of Japanese citizens by North Korea.

=== Party membership ===
In June 2014 the Restoration Party split due to disagreement between the party's leaders concerning a proposed merger with the Unity Party. Shimizu remained with the Restoration Party, led by Osaka mayor Toru Hashimoto, which completed the merger with the Unity Party in September 2014, creating the Japan Innovation Party. In August 2015 the Innovation Party suffered a split over policy issues, and Shimizu again sided with the Hashimoto-led faction that left the Innovation Party to form the Initiatives from Osaka party in October 2015.
