= Nara University of Education =

University in Nara, Japan

Coordinates: 34°40′23″N 135°50′36″E

- 奈良教育大学
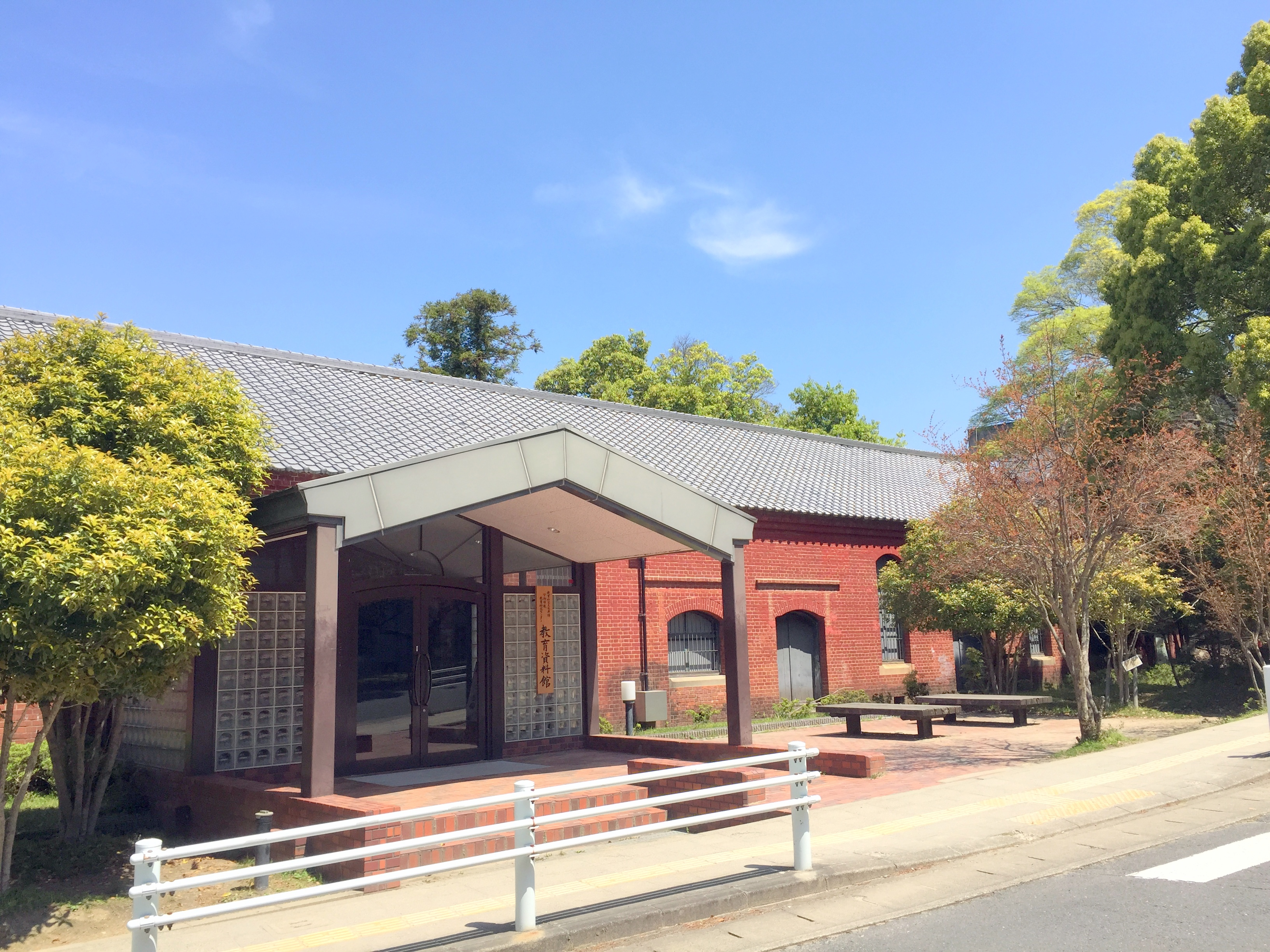
- Center for Historical Materials of Education, Nara University of Education
- Type: Public
- Established: 1888
- President: Toshiya Miyashita
- Academic staff: 112
- Administrative staff: 61
- Students: approximately 1,300
- Undergraduates: approximately 1,100
- Postgraduates: approximately 140
- Location: Nara, Nara, Nara Prefecture, Japan
- Website: International Exchange and Overseas Study, Nara University of Education

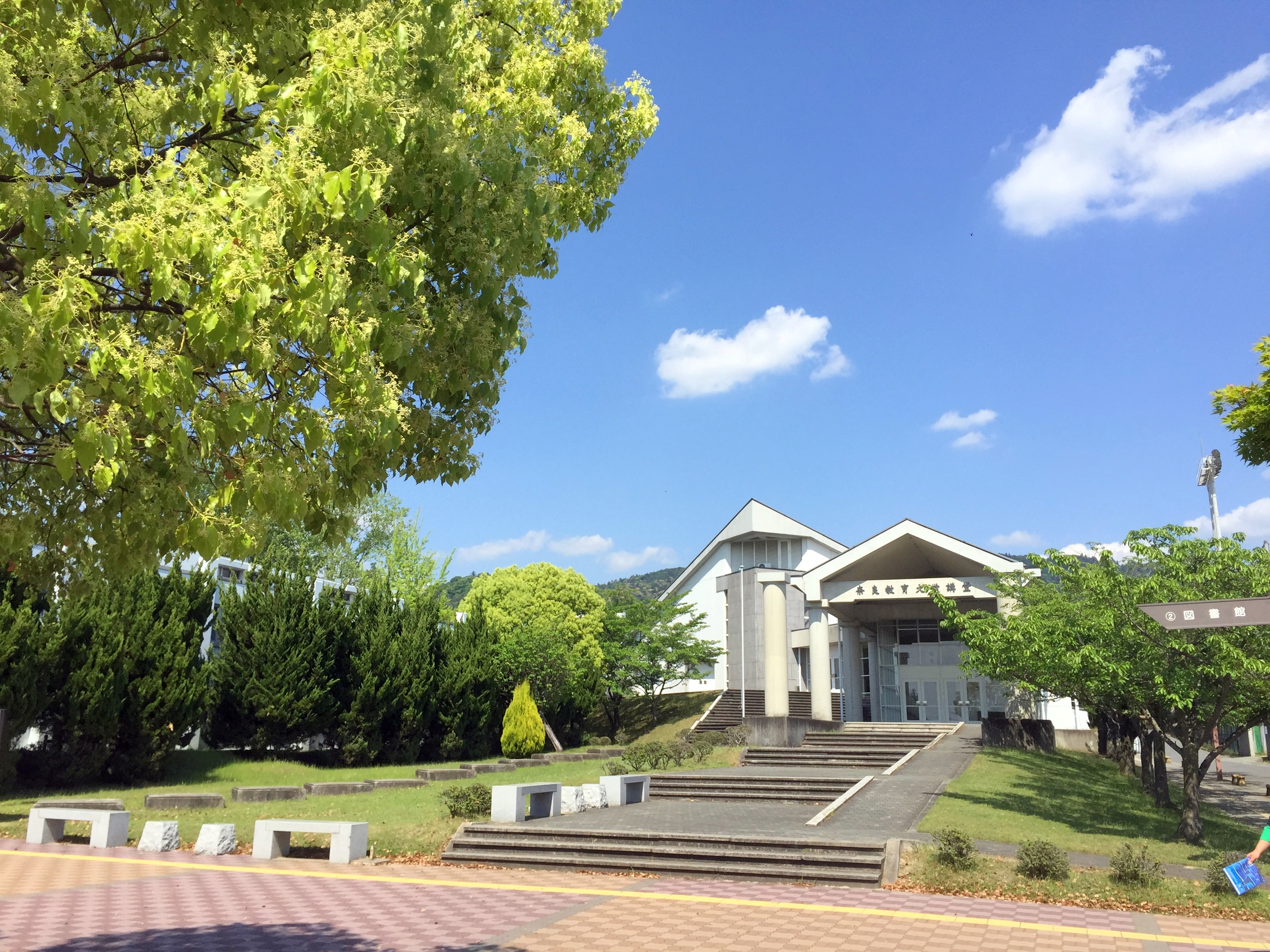
Lecture Hall at Nara University of Education

Nara University of Education (奈良教育大学, Nara kyōiku daigaku) is a national university in Nara, Japan. The predecessor of the school was founded in 1888, and it was chartered as a university in 1949.

== Location ==
The campus is located close to Nara Park, Tōdai-ji with a great statue of Buddha, Kasuga-taisha, and Kōfuku-ji, as well as Naramachi, the old town area in the central Nara City.

== Organization ==
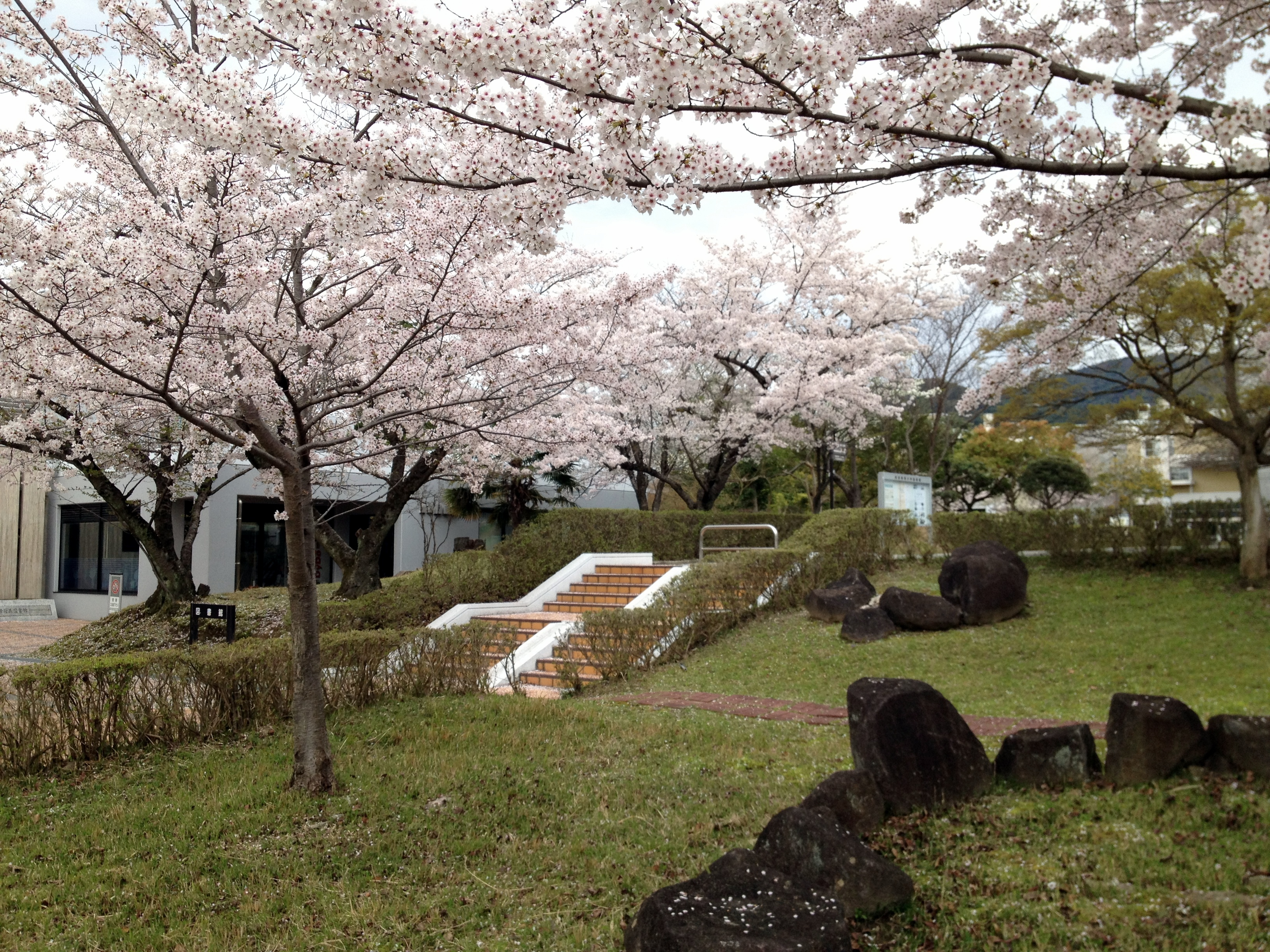
Cherry Blossoms (Sakura) at Nara University of Education

=== Faculty (undergraduate programs) ===
- Faculty of Education (教育学部)
  - Department of Teacher Training and School Education
    - Educational Progress
      - Pedagogy
      - Psychology
      - Early Childhood Education
      - Special Support Education
    - Curriculum and Instruction
      - Japanese
      - Social Studies
      - Mathematics
      - Science
      - Music
      - Fine Arts
      - Health & Sports Science
      - Home Economics
      - Technology
      - English
    - Traditional Culture
      - Calligraphy
      - Cultural Heritage

=== Graduate school ===
- Graduate School of Education (大学院教育学研究科)
  - Master's Program in Education
    - School Education
    - Curriculum and Instruction
  - Professional Degree Program in Education
    - School of Professional Development in Education

=== Postgraduate course ===
- Special Course for Teachers for Special Education (特別支援教育特別専攻科)

=== Attached organizations ===
- Educational and Academic Support Organization
  - Teacher Education Center for Future Generation
  - Library
  - Center for Intercultural Exchange and Studies
  - Center for Special Needs Education
  - Center for Education Research of Science and Mathematics
  - Center for Natural Environment Education
- Health Care Center

=== Attached schools ===
- University Attached Junior High School
- University Attached Elementary School
- University Attached Kindergarten

== Facilities ==
=== Takabatake campus (main campus) ===
Takabatake-cho, Nara, Nara

- Faculty of Education
- Graduate School of Education
- University Attached Elementary School
- University Attached Kindergarten
- University Attached Junior High School (Special Needs Class)
- Educational and Academic Support Organization
- Health Care Center

=== University Attached Junior High School (main school) ===
2052-8 Houren-cho, Nara, Nara

=== Nara Practice Field, Center for Natural Environment Education ===
Byakugoji-cho, Nara, Nara

=== Okuyoshino Practice Forest, Center for Natural Environment Education ===
Oto-cho, Gojo, Nara

=== International Student House ===
1252 Takabatake-cho, Nara, Nara

=== Student House (Tachibana House) ===
864 Kidera-cho, Nara, Nara

== Image character ==
- Nakkyon (なっきょん)
