= 2015 Hyogo prefectural election =

Local election in Japan

The 2015 Hyōgo prefectural election (2015年兵庫県議会議員選挙, 2015-nen Hyōgo Kengikai Giin Senkyo) was an election for the Hyogo Prefectural Assembly held on 12 April 2015 as part of the 2015 unified local elections in Japan. The election saw the number of assembly members reduced from 89 to 87 and the number of electoral districts reduced from 41 to 40. Voting was held in 23 districts and representatives for the remaining 17 districts (including the two-member district of Tatsuno-Ibo) were elected unopposed. The election was held in the wake of the political expenses scandal that was exposed in July 2014 involving multiple assembly members and was notable for former assemblyman Ryutaro Nonomura's outburst of uncontrolled sobbing at a news conference.

The election saw the Liberal Democratic Party (LDP) maintain their position as the largest group in the assembly with a total of 40 seats (official candidates plus independents endorsed by the party), although the party was unable to secure the 44 seats required for an outright majority. Of the other major parties, the Democratic Party of Japan (DPJ) was reduced from 16 seats to 11, while Komeito had all 13 of their candidates elected. The Japan Innovation Party, which was contesting the unified local elections for the first time, won nine seats. Voter turnout was 40.55%, a reduction of 0.88% compared to the 2011 election. Following the election, the LDP's Noriyuki Ishikawa and Ryosuke Ueda were elected speaker and vice-speaker of the assembly.

== Candidates ==
129 candidates nominated for the 87 seats in the assembly, six less than the 135 candidates who contested 89 seats in the 2011 election and the lowest number in seventy years. Amongst the candidates were 73 current members and 4 former members seeking re-election. The LDP was the only party to nominate a candidate in each of the 40 districts, however their total of 46 candidates (including official candidates and endorsed independents) made it difficult to secure the 44 seats required for an outright majority in the assembly. The DPJ fielded a total of 18 candidates, considerably less than the 32 candidates fielded at the 2011 election. Komeito fielded 13 candidates (including one endorsed independent), 11 of whom were sitting members. The candidates also included 26 women, the highest number on record.

Number of candidates by party
Party	Candidates	Districts contested (unopposed)
Liberal Democratic Party (LDP)	46	40 (17)
Democratic Party (DPJ)	18	
Communist Party (JCP)	18	
Komeitō	13	11
Japan Innovation Party	11	
Kobe Ambitious Party	5	
Independent Team for Assembly Reform	4	
New Socialist Party of Japan	1	1
Independents (excl. independents officially endorsed by a party)		(1)
Total	129	40

== Results ==
The LDP maintained their position as the largest party in the assembly, winning 40 seats including 17 uncontested. However they lost the slim majority that they had held since the resignation of two independents in December 2014. The DPJ lost six seats and were reduced to 11 members; they also lost their position as second largest party in the assembly to Komeito, who had all of their 13 candidates elected. The Innovation Party, contesting their first general election at the prefectural level, gained 7 seats to become the fourth-largest party in the assembly.

The oldest candidate in the election, 83-year old LDP candidate and former speaker of the assembly Kenzo Kamatani, finished third in the four-member Kakogawa district, thereby winning his seventh 4-year term in the assembly. Former vice-speaker Toyohiko Himura was elected unopposed to his eighth term in the assembly in the Toyooka district. LDP member for the Himeji district Hideo Iwatani was unsuccessful in seeking a ninth term.

Party	Votes	%	Seats	+/–
Liberal Democratic Party			40	–5
Komeito			13	0
Democratic Party of Japan			11	–6
Japan Innovation Party			9	New
Japanese Communist Party			5	0
Kobe Ambitious Party			1	+1
Independent Team for Assembly Reform			1	–1
New Socialist Party of Japan			0	0
Independents			7	+1
Total			87	0
Valid votes	1,437,924	97.94		
Invalid/blank votes	30,239	2.06		
Total votes	1,468,163	100.00		
Registered voters/turnout	3,620,212	40.55		
Source: (Note: Registered voters excludes districts where candidates were elected unopposed) (Note: Invalid votes includes 24 ballot sheets that were taken home and 2 ballots not accepted)

== Retiring members ==
Fourteen sitting members did not seek re-election, including two that resigned to contest mayoral elections that were held on 26 April 2015:

- Kazuo Enomoto - Akashi district, LDP, 1 term (lost Akashi mayoral election)
- Satohiro Fujii - Kita district, DPJ, 4 terms
- Hirokazu Goda - Itami district, Komeito, 4 terms
- Takeshi Goto (五島壮) - Himeji district, LDP, 7 terms
- Norimoto Ishido - Sayō district (abolished at election), LDP, 4 terms
- Tadao Kajitani - Kita district, LDP, 4 terms
- Sumie Kakemizu - Nishinomiya district, DPJ, 6 terms
- Ippo Kiritsuki - Tarumi district, LDP, 1 term
- Minoru Kitano - Himeji district, LDP, 2 terms (lost Himeji mayoral election)
- Masahiko Nagatomi - Kako district, DPJ, 4 terms
- Tsuyoshi Oda - Kasai district, LDP, 4 terms
- Yukio Ono - Himeji district, Komeito, 5 terms
- Chisato Sugimoto - Himeji district, JCP, 3 terms
- Yukio Tateishi - Hyogo district, LDP, 8 terms

== Defeated members ==
The following sitting members were defeated in the election:

- Kotaro Ikehata - Takarazuka district, independent, 2 terms
- Hideyuki Inoue - Kakogawa district, LDP, 3 terms
- Shuzo Ishihara - Nishi district, independent, 5 terms
- Hideo Iwatani - Himeji district, LDP, 8 terms
- Shinobu Kamo - Kawanishi-Kawabe district, LDP, 5 terms
- Minoru Kishiguchi - Akashi district, DPJ, 3 terms
- Shizunori Miyata - Amagasaki district, JCP, 4 terms (defeated by fellow JCP candidate Etsuko Shomoto)
- Eiichi Nakata - Sanda district, independent (reform group), 1 term
- Takahiro Otsuka - Suma district, independent (DPJ endorsed), 2 terms
- Chie Yamamoto - Itami district, DPJ, 1 term

== Returning members ==
The following candidates were returned after having previously served in the assembly :

- Hiroto Kitaguchi (Akashi district, independent, 2nd term): Was previously elected to the assembly in 1999; subsequently served two terms as mayor of Akashi from 2003 to 2011.
- Haruyo Omae (Nishinomiya district, independent, 3rd term): resigned from the assembly in December 2014 to contest the national general election held in the same month, was unsuccessful as an independent candidate in the Hyogo 7th district.
- Yuichiro Wada (Tarumi district, independent, 4th term): resigned from the assembly in December 2014 to contest the general election, was unsuccessful as a Party for Future Generations candidate in the Hyogo 3rd district.
