= Hide Kawanishi =

Japanese painter

- 川西 英
- Born: Kawanishi Hideo; 9 July 1894; Kobe, Japan
- Died: 20 February 1965 (aged 70); Kobe, Japan
- Occupation: Painter

Hide Kawanishi (川西 英, Kawanishi Hide; 9 July 1894 – 20 February 1965), born Kawanishi Hideo, was a Japanese painter. His work was part of the painting event in the art competition at the 1932 Summer Olympics.

== Biography ==
Kawanishi was born in Kobe, and graduated from business school in 1915. He was postmaster of a small post office located in his home. He was a member of the Nihon Sōsaku-Hanga Kyōkai beginning in 1923, and of the Kokugakai from 1935.

He painted and made woodblock prints in the bold modern sōsaku-hanga style. He competed in the art competition at the 1932 Summer Olympics. He died in 1965 at age 70, in Kobe. His third son Yūzaburō Kawanishi was also an artist and printmaker; he catalogued Kawanishi's prints.
