= Nagata-ku =

Ward of Kobe in Kansai, Japan

Coordinates: 34°40′12″N 135°08′39″E

Location of Nagata-ku in Kobe

Nagata (長田区, Nagata-ku) is one of 9 wards of Kobe, Japan. It has an area of 11.46 km^{2}, and a population of 96,072 (2018). This region suffered the largest number of casualties in the Great Hanshin earthquake.

== Demographics ==
Foreigners in Nagata-ku, Kobe
Nationality	Population (2018)
South Korea	4,485
Vietnam	1,486
China	744
Others	458

In recent years Nagata-ku's overall population has been decreasing, but the number of foreign residents has been increasing. Nagata-ku now has the largest Korean and Vietnamese communities in Kobe.

== Education ==
West Kobe Korean Elementary School (西神戸朝鮮初級学校), a North Korean school, is in the ward.

The South Korean government maintains the Korean Education Center (Korean: 고베한국교육원, Japanese: 神戸韓国教育院) in this ward.
