= Hyōgo Prefectural Assembly =

Prefectural parliament of Hyōgo Prefecture, Japan

Hyōgo Prefectural Assembly 兵庫県議会 Hyōgo-ken Gikai

Type
- Type: Unicameral

History
- Founded: May 15, 1879

Structure
- Seats: 87 assembly members from 40 electorates

Elections
- Voting system: Single non-transferable vote
- Last election: April 12, 2015 (2015 unified local elections)

Meeting place
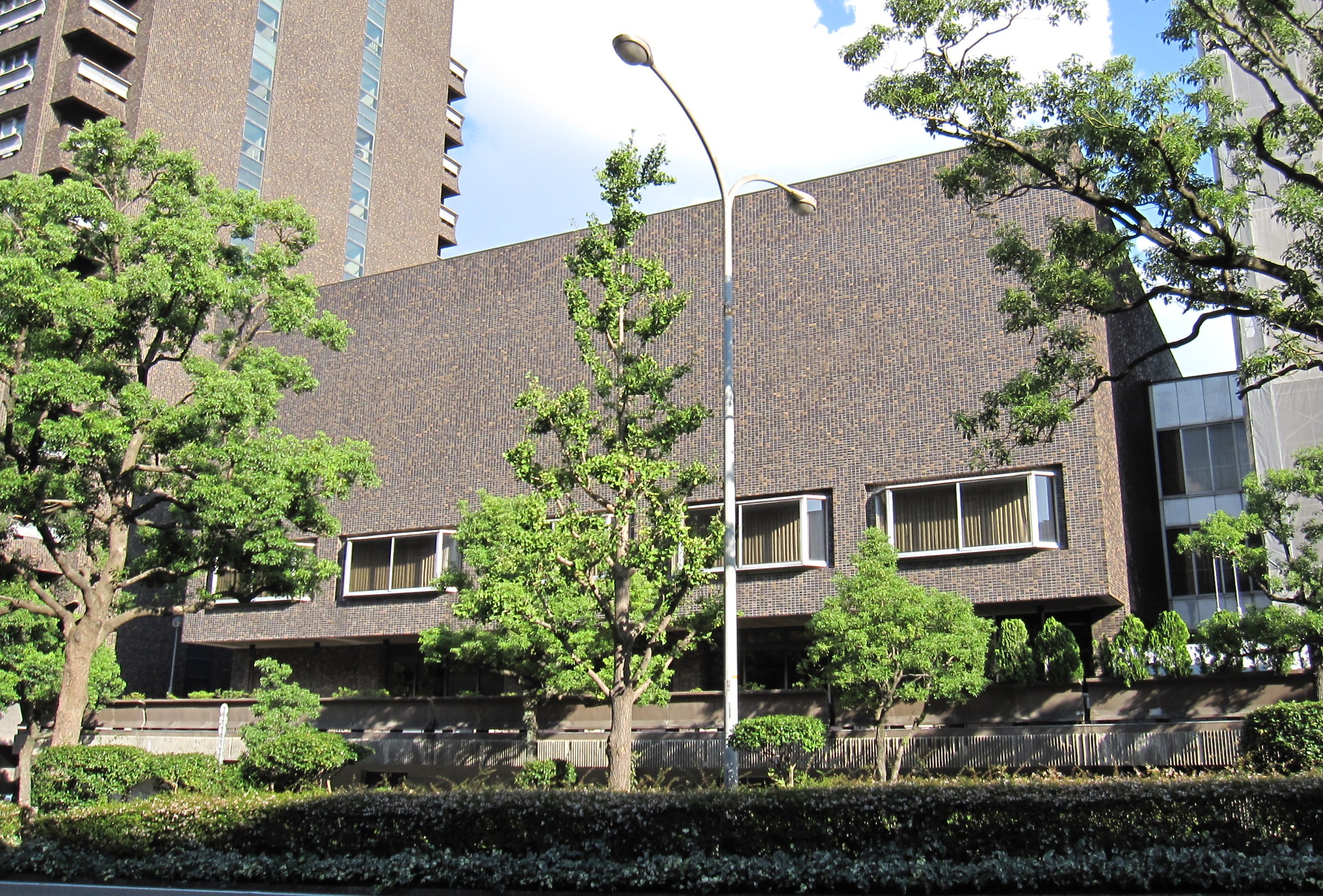

Website
- www.hyogokengikai.jp (in Japanese)

The Hyōgo Prefectural Assembly (兵庫県議会, Hyōgo-ken gikai) is the prefectural parliament of Hyōgo Prefecture.

The assembly's 87 members are elected every four years in 40 districts by single non-transferable vote. Nine of the electoral districts correspond with the wards of Kobe city and the remaining 31 districts are made up of the cities and districts (towns and villages) of the prefecture. The electoral district that represents the city of Himeji is the largest, electing 8 representatives to the assembly.

The assembly is responsible for acting as a balance against the Governor of Hyōgo Prefecture who is responsible for the administration of the prefecture. This role includes enacting and amending prefectural ordinances, approving the budget and checking the administration.

== Current composition ==
The 2015 Hyōgo prefectural election took place on April 12, 2015, as part of the 2015 unified local elections. It was the first election following a reduction in the number of members from 89 to 87. Elections were held in 23 districts and representatives for the remaining 17 districts were elected unopposed. The Liberal Democratic Party (LDP) maintained their position as the largest group in the assembly with a total of 40 seats (official candidates plus independents endorsed by the party), but were unable to secure the 44 seats required for an outright majority. The Democratic Party of Japan (DPJ) was reduced from 16 seats to 11. The Japan Innovation Party, contesting the unified local elections for the first time, won nine seats. Voter turnout was 40.55%, a reduction of 0.88% compared to the 2011 election. Following the election, the LDP's Noriyuki Ishikawa and Ryosuke Ueda were elected speaker and vice-speaker of the assembly.

As of February 2016, the assembly was composed as follows:

Composition of the Hyogo Prefectural Assembly
Parliamentary group	Seats
Liberal Democrats	37
Japan Innovation Party	20
Komeitō	13
Constitutional Democratic Party	9
Japanese Communist Party	2
Independents	3
Total	87

== Electoral districts ==
Most electoral districts correspond to the current cities of the prefecture, but several districts correspond to former districts which are no longer administrative units but are still used in the addresses of regional areas. Kobe, the largest city in the prefecture, is divided such that each of the city's nine wards is a separate electoral district. In 2014 the assembly voted to reduce the size of the assembly from 89 to 87, which resulted in a merger of the Sayō and Akō-Akō districts, as well as Takasago district's representation being reduced from two members to one.

Electoral districts
District	Municipalities	Magnitude	District	Municipalities	Magnitude
Higashinada	Higashinada ward, Kobe	3	Akō-Akō-Sayō	Akō city Kamigōri town Sayō town	1
Nada	Nada ward, Kobe	2	Nishiwaki and Taka	Nishiwaki city Taka town	1
Chūō	Chūō ward, Kobe	2	Takarazuka	Takarazuka city	3
Hyōgo	Hyōgo ward, Kobe	2	Miki	Miki city	1
Kita	Kita ward, Kobe	3	Takasago	Takasago city	1
Nagata	Nagata ward, Kobe	2	Kawanishi-Kawabe	Kawanishi city Imagawa town	3
Suma	Suma ward, Kobe	3	Ono	Ono city	1
Tarumi	Tarumi ward, Kobe	3	Sanda	Sanda city	2
Nishi	Nishi ward, Kobe	3	Kasai	Kasai city	1
Himeji	Himeji city	8	Sasayama	Sasayama city	1
Amagasaki	Amagasaki city	7	Yabu	Yabu city	1
Akashi	Akashi city	4	Tanba	Tanba city	1
Nishinomiya	Nishinomiya city	7	Minamiawaji	Minamiawaji city	1
Sumoto	Sumoto city	1	Asago	Asago city	1
Ashiya	Ashiya city	1	Awaji	Awaji city	1
Itami	Itami city	3	Shisō	Shisō city	1
Aioi	Aioi city	1	Katō	Katō city	1
Toyooka	Toyooka city	1	Kako	Harima town Inami town	1
Kakogawa	Kakogawa city	4	Kanzaki	Kukusaki town Ichikawa town Kamikawa town	1
Tatsuno-Ibo	Tatsuno city Taishi town	2	Mikata	Kami town Shinonsen town	1

== Scandals ==
=== Expenses for political activities unauthorized use problem ===
On July 1, 2014, triggered by the press conference by Ryutaro Nonomura, then assemblymember, who was accused of the unauthorized use of expenses for political activities in the previous fiscal year, they conducted an investigation on political expenses for the past three fiscal years, which they carried out for all prefectural assemblymembers, and publicized the results. As a result of the investigation, it was found that 24 prefectural assembly members, which corresponds to roughly 30%, and one faction's use of a total expenditure of approximately 4.9 million yen was illegal, and demanded its return.

Citizen groups filed a resident audit request against 8 Hyōgo Prefectural Assemblymembers, including those who had resigned, demanding returns alleging that there were improper expenditures in the expenses for political activities, but on November 11, 2014, the prefectural audit committee members rejected the request alleging that the billing period for fiscal 2011 and fiscal 2012 had expired. They also dismissed the request for fiscal 2013.

When suspicions first rose up, Nonomura strongly asserted that the use of expenses for political activities was something legal, but he eventually resigned from the prefectural assembly by the date July 11, and returned a total of 18.34 million yen in political expenses that he received since fiscal 2011 and approximately 890,000 yen of delinquency charge. In July, the Prefectural Assembly brought an accusation against Nonomura to the HPP on the crime of making of false documents/uttering of same in the joint names of each faction representative, and in the subsequent criminal investigation, it became clear that he had carried out one-day Fabricated business trips spanning 197 times a year, buying cash vouchers under the guise of "postage fees" and privately using them, falsification of his credit card usage statement, etc. In January 2015, the prefectural police sent the files on Nonomura to the Kōbe District Public Prosecutors Office (KDPPO) on suspicion of fraud and making of false documents/uttering of same. The opinion of "Severe punishment", which seeks an indictment, was marked for the prosecution. On August 18 of the same year, the KDPPO indicted Nonomura without arrest with fraud and making of false documents/uttering of same in which he cheated them out of a total of 9,132,050 yen in expenses for political activities. On July 6, 2016, the Kōbe District Court handed down a prison with hard labour sentence of 3 years and a suspended sentence of 4 years after it became an unusual public trial such as detention procedures being adopted because he refused to appear at the first public trial.

Furthermore, on the occasion of the scandal of Nonomura being scooped, coupled with the fact that it was an extremely strange spectacle in which the person in question answered questions while wailing in a loud voice at a press conference, they called it a big topic in the world, and not only was it made into a joke by comedians on Variety shows, but it was also to the extent that productions like parodies of the same conference were done in some of the TV dramas and TV animations. Moreover, many MAD Movies and Doujin music that sampled the state of the press conference were posted on the Internet, and "N’A-! HA-HA-HA-HA-HAA! This Japan NNF NNF N-HAAAAAAAAAAAN! AU-AUOUUAAAAAAAAAAAAAAAUAN! THIS JAPAN AU AU……AAH! I VANT TO JANGE……UGH……the world!", which corrupted the exclamatory noises at the time of Nonomura's conference, was chosen for the Silver Award in the Internet Buzzwords Grand Prize of the same fiscal year.

Hideo Iwatani, an LDP prefectural asm., had earmarked the highest returned amount of approximately 1.69 million yen for gasoline charges for his personal use, etc. Moreover, Shinobu Kamo, an LDP prefectural asm., returned approximately one million yen for Travel expenses for business trips accompanied by his family, etc. Citizen's Ombudsman Hyōgo and the like are filing criminal complaints against Iwatani and Kamo on suspicion of fraud, etc.

=== Other scandals ===
- November 2018 – Prefectural Asm. Akihito Tarutani (43 years old, Independent=elected by Akashi City) had failed to pay his Taxes and National Health Insurance Premiums for a long time period, and received a foreclosure notice on his assembly members' salary. In the past, Tarutani had repeatedly stirred up troubles in which he did things like repeatedly absenting himself without leave at local events in Akashi City and failing to pay NHI Premiums.
- December 2018 – On the evening of December 16, Prefectural Asm. Akihito Tarutani (44 years old, Independent=elected by Akashi City) was arrested in flagrante delicto by the Akashi Police Station on suspicion of bodily harm, alleging that he hit his wife in the face at home. In January 2019, the prefectural police sent the files on Tarutani. In February 7, the Akashi branch of the Kōbe District Public Prosecutors Office decided not to indict Tarutani. Tarutani had been doing things such as failing to pay his National Health Insurance Premiums, so in December 2018, the prefectural assembly unanimously resolved advice to resign. Tarutani decided not to resign.
