= Hiroo Wada =

Japanese politician

- 和田 博雄
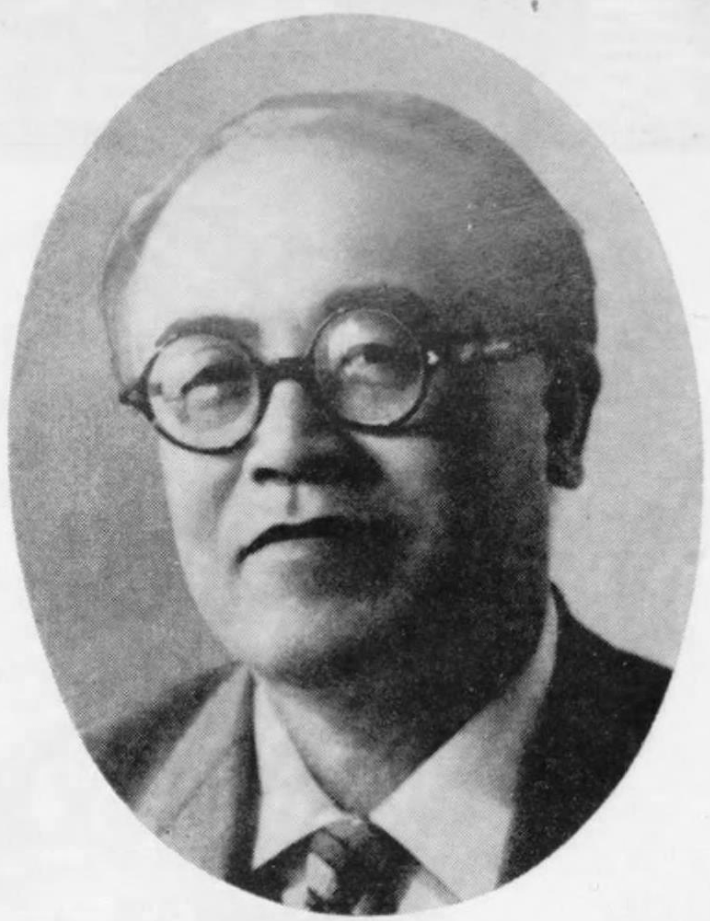
- From Nihon Shakaitō 20-nen no Kiroku (Records of 20 Years of the Japan Socialist Party, November 1965)

Minister of Agriculture and Forestry
- In office 22 May 1946 – 31 January 1947
- Prime Minister: Shigeru Yoshida
- Preceded by: Senpachi Soejima
- Succeeded by: Shigeru Yoshida

Director-General of the Economic Stabilization Board Director-General of the Price Agency
- In office 1 June 1947 – 10 March 1948
- Prime Minister: Tetsu Katayama
- Preceded by: Sōtarō Takase
- Succeeded by: Takeo Kurusu

Member of the House of Representatives
- In office 2 October 1952 – 27 December 1966
- Constituency: Okayama 1st district

Member of the House of Councillors
- In office 21 April 1947 – 1952
- Constituency: National district

Personal details
- Born: February 17, 1903 Kawagoe, Saitama, Japan
- Died: March 4, 1967 (aged 64) Tokyo, Japan
- Party: Japan Socialist Party (1949–1967)
- Other political affiliations: Ryokufūkai (1947–1949); Leftist Socialist Party of Japan (1951–1955)
- Education: Tokyo Imperial University (Faculty of Law)
- Awards: Grand Cordon of the Order of the Sacred Treasure; Junior First Rank

Hiroo Wada (和田 博雄, Wada Hiroo; 17 February 1903 – 4 March 1967) was a Japanese politician and bureaucrat of the Ministry of Agriculture and Forestry. He served as the 4th Minister of Agriculture and Forestry, the 4th Director-General of the Economic Stabilization Board, and the 4th Director-General of the Price Agency. He was a member of the House of Representatives (six terms) and the House of Councillors (one term).

== Biography ==
=== Early life ===
Wada was born in Kawagoe, Saitama, as the son of a teacher at a secondary school under the old system. Because his father was transferred to a secondary school in Okayama Prefecture, he received his education from elementary school through higher school (the Sixth Higher School) in Okayama Prefecture.

After graduating from the Sixth Higher School (under the old system), he entered the Faculty of Law at Tokyo Imperial University (now the University of Tokyo), graduating in 1925. Although many of those later arrested in the Planning Board Incident came from socialist movements, and Wada himself belonged to the controlled-economy faction, he never participated in socialist or left-wing student movements.

He joined the Ministry of Agriculture and Forestry, assigned to the Agricultural Affairs Bureau.

=== Planning Board Incident ===
During the war, Wada was seconded from the Ministry of Agriculture and Forestry to serve as an investigator at the Planning Board, where he worked on establishing the wartime controlled economy.

As a member of the "senior officials group" in the Planning Board Incident, he was arrested along with Hidezō Inaba, Chifuyu Masaki, Tadataka Sata, Seiichi Katsumata, and Kōsaku Wada for violating the Peace Preservation Law. They had been responsible for drafting the original proposal for the "Outline for the Establishment of a New Economic System" published in October 1940. This outline was strongly criticized by business circles, led by Commerce and Industry Minister Ichizō Kobayashi, as communist ideology.

After approximately three years of detention, he was released on bail and acquitted in September 1945, immediately after the end of the war (among those arrested, only Tadataka Sata was convicted).

=== As a cabinet minister ===
In the same month as his acquittal (September), Wada returned to the Ministry of Agriculture and Forestry and became Director of the Agricultural Administration Bureau the following October. When Shigeru Yoshida became prime minister in 1946, having failed to form a coalition with the Socialist Party, he needed to give his cabinet a national-unity appearance and felt the necessity of economic controls and land reform. He therefore approached left-wing intellectuals for cabinet posts, but was rejected by all of them. Yoshida then selected Wada as Minister of Agriculture and Forestry. Although there was opposition within the Liberal Party to appointing someone with a record of arrest in the Planning Board Incident, Bukichi Miki persuaded them by arguing: “If we reject Wada as Agriculture Minister and destroy the Yoshida Cabinet, what will happen if GHQ then calls on the Socialist Party and the Communist Party to form a coalition?” Wada successfully carried out the second agricultural land reform and won Yoshida’s trust.

In 1947, after the Socialist Party became the largest party in the 23rd general election for the House of Representatives and Tetsu Katayama became prime minister, Yoshida recommended Wada to Katayama. Wada was appointed Director-General of the Economic Stabilization Board and concurrently Director-General of the Price Agency in the Katayama Cabinet. He employed economists such as Shigeto Tsuru and had them produce the Economic White Paper, while promoting an economic recovery policy centered on coal and steel (the priority production system).

In December of the same year, during the Shōwa Emperor’s postwar tour of Okayama Prefecture, Wada had the opportunity to have an audience with the Emperor.

=== As a politician ===
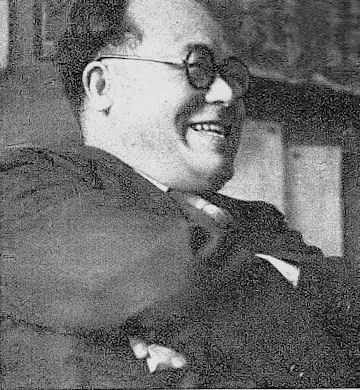
1951

In the 1st ordinary election for the House of Councillors in 1947, he was elected from the national constituency and became a member of the House of Councillors, initially belonging to the Ryokufūkai.

In 1949 he joined the Japan Socialist Party. At the time, Japan was in a state of deflation due to the Dodge Line, and many intellectuals predicted the collapse of the free-market economy; Wada was convinced that the era of socialism was coming.

When the Socialist Party split in 1951, Wada joined the Left Socialist Party of Japan. In 1948 he was summoned as a witness before the House of Representatives Special Committee on Investigation of Improper Property Transactions in connection with the textile scandal.

In the Left Socialist Party, Wada became chairman of the Policy Research Council and published a policy plan opposing the U.S. and Japan Mutual Defense Assistance Agreement, attracting media attention and gaining fans among newspaper reporters. In 1952 he was elected to the House of Representatives from the former Okayama 1st district, and in 1954 he became secretary-general of the Left Socialist Party. However, he did not get along temperamentally with party chairman Mosaburō Suzuki, and in order to counter Suzuki he allied himself with the Japan Socialist Association, gradually adopting more dogmatic statements. He also opposed the reunification of the Socialist Party in 1955 and was excluded from the seven top party posts in the leadership immediately after reunification.

In 1957 he became chairman of the Policy Research Council of the Socialist Party, but the following year he was suspended from party officer rights for one year and dismissed as Policy Research Council chairman for having received improper political donations from the National Federation of Purchasing Agricultural Cooperatives (Zenkōren) (the Zenkōren Incident).

In the early 1960s, when the theory of structural reform rose within the Socialist Party, the Wada faction collectively supported structural reform. However, by this time relations between Wada and Saburō Eda, the standard-bearer of structural reform, had deteriorated. During the Left Socialist Party period, Wada had been made responsible for the newspaper Shakai Times at Eda’s instigation and had incurred enormous debts (there is also a theory denying this). In addition, Eda, also from Okayama Prefecture, showed a desire to run in the same former Okayama 1st district as Wada. Nevertheless, in 1961 Wada was elected International Bureau Director of the Socialist Party with the support of the structural reform faction.

Wada sought to promote the realistic transformation of the Socialist Party by deepening cooperation with social democratic parties in advanced countries, but from this period his physical strength declined, which also sapped his energy. In 1964 he was elected vice-chairman of the Socialist Party together with Kōzō Sasaki. The following year, when chairman Jōtarō Kawakami resigned due to illness, Wada was regarded as a strong candidate for successor, but he had already lost the will to aim for the premiership from the position of Socialist Party chairman. He yielded the chairmanship to Sasaki and retired from politics in 1967.

He studied under the haiku poet Toten Naitō and published a collection of haiku.

While walking to attend a general meeting of the Modern Haiku Association, he collapsed from a myocardial infarction near Shiba Park and died at the age of 64. On the day of his death he was posthumously awarded the Grand Cordon of the Order of the Sacred Treasure (promoted from the Fifth Class) and raised in court rank from Junior Fifth Rank to Junior First Rank.

== Evaluation ==
As a rare bureaucrat-origin politician in the Socialist Party, Wada attracted expectations from both inside and outside the party, but he was unable to fully demonstrate his abilities. While responsibility also lies with the Socialist Party for failing to make full use of his talents, a major cause was his inability to build a good relationship with the party’s most powerful figure, Mosaburō Suzuki. His cooperation with Saburō Eda also did not go well, and he was unable to expand his influence within the party by utilizing the structural reform debate.

The greatest reason Wada could not fully succeed as a politician is said to be that he retained the odor of a bureaucrat and scholar to the end and never truly became a politician.

On the day of his death, then Prime Minister Eisaku Satō noted the news of Wada’s death in his diary, writing “a pitiful, unfortunate politician.”

== Works ==
=== Sole author ===
- Nōchi Chōseihō no Kaisetsu (Explanation of the Agricultural Land Adjustment Act). Nihon Keizai Shimbunsha, April 1946. NCID BN13389028, JPNO 46020010.
- Tōya no Eki (Station on a Winter Night). Sawarabi-kai, November 1959. NCID BA3763345X, JPNO 60005224.
- Kushū Hakuu (Haiku Collection: Sudden Shower). Hatsune Shobō, January 1967. NCID BA60980432.
- Wada Hiroo Kushō (Selected Haiku of Hiroo Wada). Committee for the Construction of the Haiku Monument of the Late Hiroo Wada, March 1969. NCID BA38437479, JPNO 20092137.

=== Contributions ===
- “Sekai Keizai no Dōkō to Nōgyō Kyōdō Kumiai” (“Trends in the World Economy and Agricultural Cooperatives”), in Nōgyō Kyōdō Kumiai no Shintō (The Path of Agricultural Cooperatives). Nōchi Kaikaku Kyōgikai, August 1947, pp. 1–14. JPNO 22100042.

=== Co-translations ===
- C. R. Attlee (translated by Hiroo Wada and Fusao Yamaguchi). Attorī Jiden (Attlee’s Autobiography), Vol. 1. Shinchōsha, Ichi-jikan Bunko series, April 1955. NCID BN10451103, JPNO 55002827.
- C. R. Attlee (translated by Hiroo Wada and Fusao Yamaguchi). Attorī Jiden (Attlee’s Autobiography), Vol. 2. Shinchōsha, Ichi-jikan Bunko series, April 1955. NCID BN10451103, JPNO 55002947.

=== Collected posthumous works ===
- Wada Hiroo Ikōshū (Collected Posthumous Writings of Hiroo Wada). Nōrin Tōkei Kyōkai, December 1981. NCID BN10454156, JPNO 82050991.

== Notes ==
Assembly seats
Preceded by Kanae Hatano	Chair of the Budget Committee of the House of Councillors; 1951–1952	Succeeded by Tadayasu Iwasawa
Political offices
Preceded by Sōtarō Takase	Director-General of the Economic Stabilization Board; 1947–1948	Succeeded by Takeo Kurusu
Preceded by Sōtarō Takase	Director-General of the Price Agency; 1947–1948	Succeeded by Takeo Kurusu
Preceded by Senpachi Soejima	Minister of Agriculture and Forestry; 1946–1947	Succeeded by Shigeru Yoshida
Party political offices
Preceded by Kōdō Itō	Chairman of the Policy Research Council of the Japan Socialist Party; 2nd: 1957–1959	Succeeded by Seiichi Katsumata
