= 1976 Japanese general election =

- 5 December 1976

All 511 seats in the House of Representatives 256 seats needed for a majority
- Turnout: 73.45% (▲1.69pp)
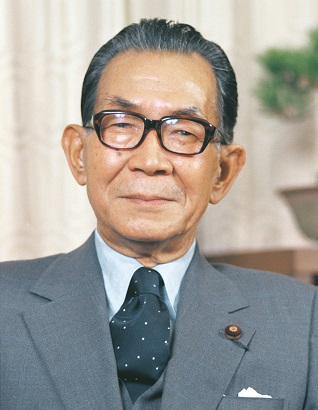

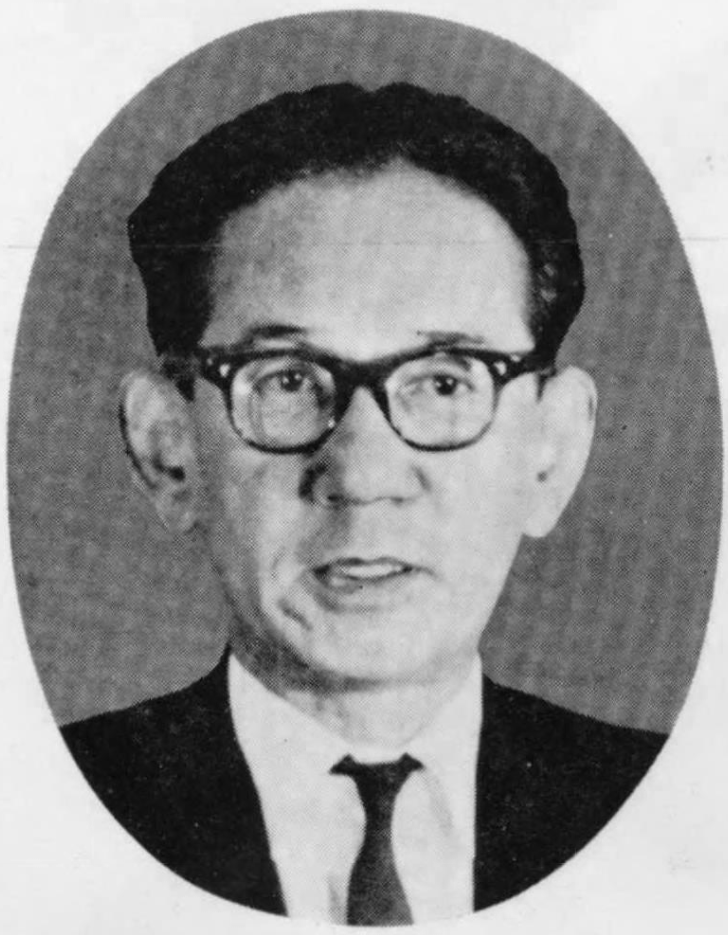

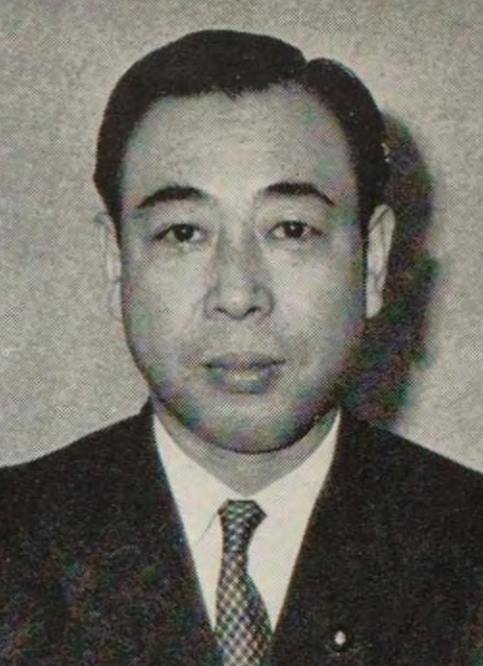

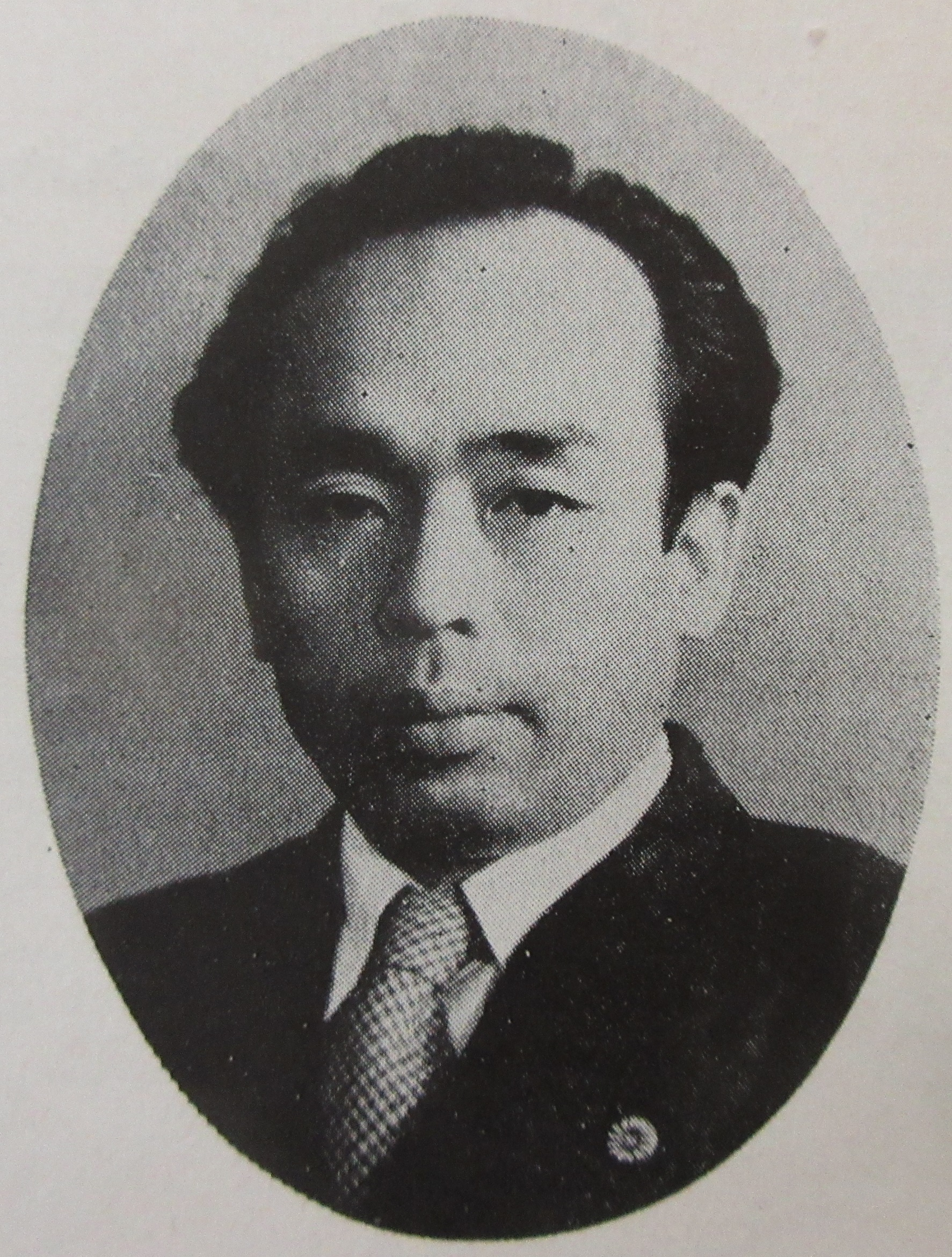

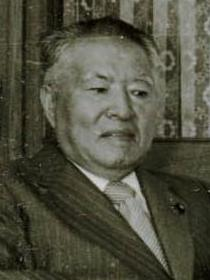

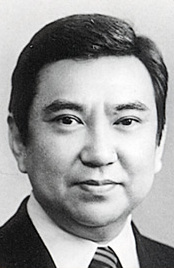
	First party	Second party	Third party
Leader	Takeo Miki	Tomomi Narita	Yoshikatsu Takeiri
Party	LDP	Socialist	Kōmeitō
Last election	46.85%, 271 seats	21.90%, 118 seats	8.46%, 29 seats
Seats won	249	123	55
Seat change	▼22	▲5	▲26
Popular vote	23,653,626	11,713,009	6,177,300
Percentage	41.78%	20.69%	10.91%
Swing	▼5.07pp	▼1.21pp	▲2.45pp
	Fourth party	Fifth party	Sixth party
Leader	Kasuga Ikkō	Kenji Miyamoto	Yōhei Kōno
Party	Democratic Socialist	JCP	New Liberal Club
Last election	6.98%, 19 seats	10.49%, 38 seats	Did not exist
Seats won	29	17	17
Seat change	▲10	▼21	New
Popular vote	3,554,076	5,878,192	2,363,985
Percentage	6.28%	10.38%	4.18%
Swing	▼0.70pp	▼0.11pp	New
Prime Minister before election
Takeo Miki
LDP
Prime Minister after election
Takeo Fukuda
LDP

General elections were held in Japan on 5 December 1976. Voter turnout was 73.45%. This election was noted for seeing 124 newcomers win seats for the first time, along with the defeat of some legacy candidates, signalling a generational shift in the Japanese political landscape. To date, the 1976 election has been the only post-war general election triggered by an expiration of the term of the House of Representatives; all other post-war elections have been instigated by a dissolution of the House by the Cabinet.

While the Liberal Democratic Party wound up, as usual, with more seats than any competing party, it lost 22 seats to fall short of a majority, winning 249 of 511 races (47%), making this the first time they lost their majority. The 1976 election was heavily informed by the Lockheed bribery scandals and became popularly known as the Lockheed Election (ロッキード選挙, rokkīdo senkyo). The incumbent Prime Minister, Takeo Miki, was seen as a reformer within his own party, and he did not obstruct the investigations into the Lockheed scandal as some of those in his party had desired. Despite this, Miki's cabinet had lukewarm approval ratings, with positive ratings across different news sources ranging from 41-47% and negative ones being lower at 12-27%. The scandal reflected poorly on the LDP and the party lost 22 seats from the last election, in the process losing its majority control over the House of Representatives for the first time since the party's founding. However, when the LDP's showing is combined with the votes cast for the spin-off New Liberal Club as well as independents who were not endorsed by the LDP but joined the party after this election, the total number of votes for conservative candidates actually saw an overall increase.

The two left-wing opposition parties, the Japan Socialist Party and the Japanese Communist Party, saw noticeable setbacks. The JSP did gain seats, but it was only five, and in the process two former chairmen (Kōzō Sasaki and Seiichi Katsumata) and the incumbent vice-chairman and former chairman Saburō Eda all lost their seats. The JCP suffered far worse, losing 21 seats and falling to less than half its number of seats compared to the last election, likely due to protest votes going towards the new moderate options such as the NLC instead of the JCP. The main winners among the traditional opposition were the moderate parties. In the case of Kōmeitō, the party recovered from scandals in the 1972 general elections by distancing itself from Soka Gakkai and putting up non-Soka Gakkai adherents as candidates in the 1975 local elections as well as this election. Komeito also reinforced its image as an anti-LDP party by endorsing various leftist campaigns. On the other hand, the Democratic Socialist Party, which did see a slight decrease in popular votes, nonetheless had managed to gain ten seats in this election.

Following the election, Miki resigned as LDP leader after the LDP's poor showing and Takeo Fukuda was elected the new LDP leader and prime minister.

== Results ==
Party	Votes	%	Seats	+/–
Liberal Democratic Party	23,653,626	41.78	249	−22
Japan Socialist Party	11,713,009	20.69	123	+5
Komeitō	6,177,300	10.91	55	+26
Japanese Communist Party	5,878,192	10.38	17	−21
Democratic Socialist Party	3,554,076	6.28	29	+10
New Liberal Club	2,363,985	4.18	17	New
Other parties	45,114	0.08	0	−2
Independents	3,227,463	5.70	21	+7
Total	56,612,765	100.00	511	+20
Valid votes	56,612,765	98.91		
Invalid/blank votes	623,857	1.09		
Total votes	57,236,622	100.00		
Registered voters/turnout	77,926,588	73.45		
Source: Statistics Bureau of Japan

Seats won per district

=== By prefecture ===
Prefecture	Total seats	Seats won						
Prefecture	Total seats	LDP	JSP	Kōmeitō	DSP	JCP	NLC	Ind.
Aichi	22	8	5	1	4	1		3
Akita	8	4	4					
Aomori	7	5		1		1		
Chiba	16	8	3	2		1		2
Ehime	9	6	2					1
Fukui	4	2	1					1
Fukuoka	19	8	5	4	2			
Fukushima	12	8	3					1
Gifu	9	7	1	1				
Gunma	10	7	3					
Hiroshima	12	6	3	1	1		1	
Hokkaido	22	9	10	2	1			
Hyōgo	20	8	4	4	1	1	2	
Ibaraki	12	5	4	1				2
Ishikawa	6	5	1					
Iwate	8	5	2					1
Kagawa	6	4	2					
Kagoshima	11	8	3					
Kanagawa	19	3	5	3	3		5	
Kōchi	5	2	1	1		1		
Kumamoto	10	6	2	1				1
Kyoto	10	2	1	2	2	2	1	
Mie	9	5	2	1	1			
Miyagi	9	5	2	1			1	
Miyazaki	6	2	1		1			2
Nagano	13	8	4					1
Nagasaki	9	4	2	1	1		1	
Nara	5	2	1	1	1			
Niigata	15	7	5		1			2
Ōita	7	5	2					
Okayama	10	5	3	2				
Okinawa	5	2	1	1		1		
Osaka	26	8	3	7	3	4	1	
Saga	5	4						1
Saitama	15	7	4	2			2	
Shiga	5	2	1		1	1		
Shimane	5	3	2					
Shizuoka	14	8	2	1	2		1	
Tochigi	10	5	3	1	1			
Tokushima	5	3	1	1				
Tokyo	43	14	8	10	2	4	2	3
Tottori	4	2	2					
Toyama	6	4	2					
Wakayama	6	4	1	1				
Yamagata	8	5	3					
Yamaguchi	9	5	2	1	1			
Yamanashi	5	4	1					
Total	511	249	123	55	29	17	17	21
