= Seiichi Katsumata =

Japanese politician (1908–1989)

- 勝間田 清一
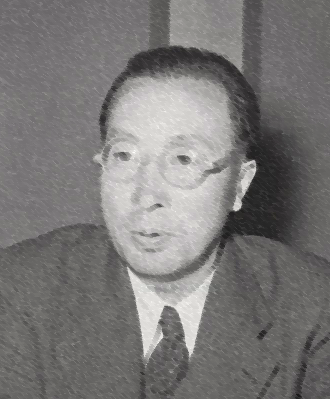
- Katsumata in 1953

Vice Speaker of the House of Representatives
- In office 26 December 1983 – 2 June 1986
- Speaker: Kenji Fukunaga; Michita Sakata
- Preceded by: Haruo Okada
- Succeeded by: Shinnen Tagaya

Chairman of the Japan Socialist Party
- In office 19 August 1967 – 4 October 1968
- Preceded by: Kōzō Sasaki
- Succeeded by: Tomomi Narita

Member of the House of Representatives
- In office 8 October 1979 – 2 June 1986
- Preceded by: Yoshio Watanabe
- Succeeded by: Hideyuki Maejima
- Constituency: Shizuoka 2nd
- In office 26 April 1947 – 9 December 1976
- Preceded by: Constituency established
- Succeeded by: Yoshio Watanabe
- Constituency: Shizuoka 2nd

Personal details
- Born: 11 February 1908 Gotemba, Shizuoka, Japan
- Died: 14 December 1989 (aged 81)
- Party: Socialist
- Other political affiliations: LSP (1951–1955)
- Education: Kyoto Imperial University

Seiichi Katsumata (勝間田 清一, Katsumata Seiichi; 11 February 1908 – 14 December 1989) was a Japanese politician who briefly served as the chairman of the Japan Socialist Party from 1967 until 1968. He also served in a few other positions, such as chairman of policy deliberation, Diet Committee chairman, House of Representatives vice-chairman. He was also known to be a spy for the Soviet Union.

== Early life and education ==
Katsumata was born in Gotemba, Shizuoka. Although the Katsumata family name can be traced back to local lords in the Katsumata Manor in Tōtōmi Province's Haibara District (now Makinohara), the Katsumata household scattered throughout the rest of the country after they attempted and failed to rise in revolt against Imagawa Yoshitada in 1476. Those descendants continued to scrape by through working in agriculture, and by the time Seiichi was born, his family household was still making a living by running a business from the house in areas such as sericulture.

Starting at Gotemba Vocational School (now Gotemba High School), young Seiichi moved onto an Utsunomiya agricultural school (which today is Utsunomiya University), and from there he moved further on to Kyoto Imperial University (now Kyoto University). During the period in which he was based in Utsunomiya, he became acquainted with Marxist and socialist thought and held on to it since.

After graduating from university, he got a job at a legal organisation and before long he transitioned to working at a government cabinet research bureau. There he met and got to know Hiroo Wada. Before long, this research bureau developed into the so-called Planning Institute (企画院), where he was an investigator. In 1941, Katsumata became the Kyushu chapter leader for the Imperial Rule Assistance Association's organisation department, but after he was implicated in a scandal involving the IRAA's planning department, he was arrested.

== Political career ==
In the 1947 general election, he won his first election as a Japan Socialist Party candidate, after which he worked as a secretary for his old acquaintance Hiroo Wada, who had been appointed as Director General for the Headquarters for Economic Stabilization under the Katayama cabinet. After Wada had joined the Socialist Party, Katsumata affiliated himself with Wada's faction in the party, and after the Socialist Party split into two different parties, Katsumata followed Wada into the new Leftist Socialist Party.

In 1955, the two socialist parties reunited into the Japan Socialist Party, and Katsumata assumed the role of Diet Strategy Chairman. In 1958, when Wada was dismissed from his position as Policy Deliberation Chairman, Katsumata succeeded him in this capacity. Hereafter, Katsumata played a leading role in the Wada faction's activities, and distinguished himself in the Wada faction, which was primarily composed of ex-bureaucrats like Wada and Katsumada themselves, by trying to acquire greater political tact, something that was seen as lacking among ex-bureaucrats across the political spectrum. During the legislative debates surrounding the revised US-Japan Security Treaty, Katsumata joined the other socialist leaders in demanding clarifications from government figures over their contradicting comments concerning the nature of the treaty, attracting much public media attention. When issues relating to China–Japan relations came up in 1961, Katsumata was reported as being relatively less pro-Beijing than Kōzō Sasaki, and disputes over China were believed to be one of the main rifts within the JSP at the time.

When the Sanrizuka Struggle began in 1966, Matsukata gave an on-site speech in support of the movement, as the Socialist Party supported it as well, and received recognition for it. In 1967, Katsumata criticised Prime Minister Eisaku Satō and the government while the latter were in discussion with the United States concerning the possible reversion of Okinawa to Japanese authority. Katsumata criticised the Japanese government their support of United States overseas military endeavours, accusing them of "entrapping Japan further into a large U.S. military strategy in the Far East," citing the Japanese leadership's support of the war in Vietnam as an example, and also discussed his opposition to having United States military bases on Okinawa, as well as the possibility of nuclear weapons being present on the islands.

In 1967, when Wada retired from politics, Katsumata inherited the Wada faction's loyalty. In the same year, there were disputes regarding a bill concerning health insurance exceptions, and when then-Chairman Kōzō Sasaki resigned from his position, Katsumata secured the leadership position with the backing of the Sasaki faction. In regards to succeeding Sasaki, Saburō Eda had also announced his candidacy, but Sasaki did not prefer Eda to become the chairman and thus designated Katsumata as his successor.

When Katsumata had assumed his role as the party leader, he carried out a campaign in which he had direct dialogues with citizens, but in the 1968 House of Councillors election, the Socialist Party suffered defeat by winning less than 30 of the contested seats (and losing eight seats from the last election, whereas all of the other opposition parties gained seats). Katsumata was forced to take responsibility and resign as chairman and was succeeded by Tomomi Narita. In the 1976 general election, despite the JSP increasing its net seat count, the leaders of the three most powerful JSP factions (Sasaki, Eda, and Katsumata) all lost their seats in the 1976 election. However, Katsumata promptly took back his seat in the 1979 election and did not fail to be reelected since then.

Katsumata was known within the party as a theorist, and assisted the formulation of the "Road to Establish Socialism in Japan" plan while serving as the Secretary General of the Socialist Theory Committee. Afterwards, his stood out with his dogmatic speech and conduct which affirmed theories such as the dictatorship of the proletariat. When he assumed the role of founding Chief of the Socialist Theory Center in 1978, he began work on things such as revising the aforementioned party plan, and because the party sometimes changed its course of plan, his theories were often changing again and again.

In 1983, he was chosen to be the House of Representatives Vice-Chairman, but he retired from politics only three years later. In the same year that he retired, he became the first Socialist Party chairman to be awarded the Grand Cordon of the Order of the Rising Sun, First Class. He died on 14 December 1989, aged 81 years old.

At the National Diet Library's Constitutional Government Reference Room, stenographic recordings of his talks are open to the public after they were left behind.

== Legacy ==
Since the work of one of the postwar period's most visible leftists was heavily based around theory, his influence through mass media was quite weak. He was forced to resign as chairman without being popular with the public and leaving few public achievements. He also faced obstacles that frustrated his political career, such as the earlier scandals from the wartime period. Reflecting the overall lack of popularity of politicians, neither Katsumata nor even then-Prime Minister Eisaku Satō managed to reach any spot on a Waseda University student poll asking for favourite politicians.

In the context of socialist theory, he was granted an honorary PhD from the East German Martin Luther University of Halle-Wittenberg.

== KGB spying ==
According to the testimony of ex-KGB spy Stanislav Levchenko, who had fled the Soviet Union for America, Matsukata was a spy for the KGB and went by the codename GAVR, and later on the Mitrokhin Archive also backed up these claims.
