= Ichio Asukata =

Japanese politician (1915–1990)

- 飛鳥田 一雄
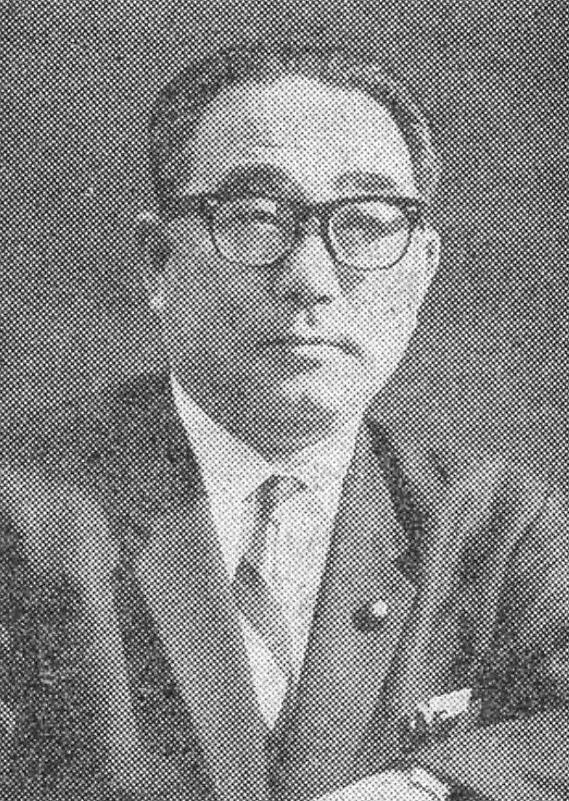
- Asukata in 1963

Chairman of the Japan Socialist Party
- In office 17 December 1977 – 7 September 1983
- Preceded by: Tomomi Narita
- Succeeded by: Masashi Ishibashi

Member of the House of Representatives
- In office 8 October 1979 – 28 November 1983
- Preceded by: Yoshikata Asō
- Succeeded by: Yoshiaki Kiura
- Constituency: Tokyo 1st
- In office 20 April 1953 – 9 April 1963
- Preceded by: Toshiko Matsuo
- Succeeded by: Chiyozō Noma
- Constituency: Kanagawa 1st

Mayor of Yokohama
- In office 23 April 1963 – 1 March 1978
- Preceded by: Kiyoshi Nakarai
- Succeeded by: Michikazu Saigo

Personal details
- Born: 2 April 1915 Yokohama, Kanagawa, Japan
- Died: 11 October 1990 (aged 75) Kamakura, Kanagawa, Japan
- Party: Socialist
- Other political affiliations: LSP (1953–1955)
- Education: Meiji University

Ichio Asukata (飛鳥田 一雄, Asukata Ichio; April 2, 1915 – October 11, 1990) was a Japanese politician who served as chairman of the Japan Socialist Party, and as mayor of Yokohama from 1963 to 1978.

== Early life and education ==
Asukata was born in Yokohama, Kanagawa. He was born in the house of a physician who was a member of a well-established family from nearby Atsugi city. His father was Kiichi Atsukata, a lawyer who worked for both the Chairman of the Yokohama City Council as well as the Superintending Prosecutor of the Takamatsu High Public Prosecutors' Office. Around the age of five, young Asukata developed polio, which left his left leg disabled. Around this time, he changed the kanji reading of his name from Kazuo to Ichiwo (the wo character is pronounced o in modern Japanese). He attended the school that today is Kibogaoka Senior High School in Kanagawa, and then tried taking entry examinations to get into Mito Senior High School (now Ibaraki University), but he was disqualified due to obstacles presented by his disabled left leg. Around this time, he was classmates with Tooru Terada and Takeshi Kawai (when the latter ran as a Liberal Democratic Party candidate in the Yokohama mayoral race against Asukata in 1971, it was dubbed a "classroom confrontation").

After he dropped out of Chuo University, he moved over to Meiji University to pursue film studies there. He graduated from there, and afterwards he took the exams for the "higher civil service examinations," becoming a lawyer as a result. In the immediate post-war period, he was assigned to defend various B and C class war criminals.

== Political career ==
He became a Yokohama City Assembly member in 1949, then a Kanagawa Prefectural Assembly Member in 1951, and finally a House of Representatives member in the 1953 general election for the Leftist Socialist Party of Japan. In the Socialist Party, he belonged to Heiwa Dōshikai ("Harmonious Association of Kindred Spirits"), which at that time was the most left-wing faction of the Socialist Party, and he focused most of his energies to opposition towards United States military bases in Japan. In addition, he was a vocal opponent of the 1960 security treaty with the United States.

In 1963, he was elected Mayor of Yokohama with the JSP's backing. He was one of the leading early leaders of the progressive local government movement, founding the National Association of Progressive Mayors. This movement involved left-of-centre opposition parties building their strength in local assemblies, with a focus on improving quality of life. This inspired imitators in several other cities, including Tokyo governor Ryokichi Minobe, and soon enough these progressive local governments began to spread throughout the rest of the country. However, at the time of his initial election, he made note of the fact that the Yokohama establishment was still by and large dominated by conservatives and said that being elected was like "landing alone on the top of Mt. Fuji by parachute: I occupied only the summit, while the whole of the mountain was in the hands of the enemy." His tenure as mayor was marked by efforts to realise local direct democracy, which was criticised by more conservative members of the city council as "disregard for parliamentarianism." He naturally pursued policies relating to things such as parks, daycare centres, and pollution control. However, concerns such as high prices in the city proved to be an obstacle for him as, being a mayor, he had little power to control these things but was still expected to solve it. His image was also hurt by a scandal in which an aide was arrested for right to light-related corruption. At the height of the Vietnam War, he continued to make anti-war and anti-military base statements, lending support to the so-called 1972 "tank struggles" in Japan.

In 1977, he succeeded Tomomi Narita in becoming the Japan Socialist Party's chairman. In the 1978 vote by the Diet to appoint the prime minister, the JSP voted for Vice Chairman Shōichi Shimodaira, due to the fact that Atsukata was a non-Diet member. Atsukata resigned from his position as Mayor of Yokohama and ran for the House of Representatives in the 1979 general election instead. However, his decision to resign was opposed by his local supporters, and so he could not rely on a strong power base to vote for him in Yokohama. As a result, he decided to run from Tokyo 1st district instead, However, there were still issues as now that he was in an area where he lacked a power base at his disposal, he was unable to really assist other JSP candidates.

Atsukata set out to make the JSP more open by introducing a system in which the party leader can be selected by all party members. He also tried to increase the appeal of the JSP by expanding party membership and setting up closer coordination with citizen interests groups. He also reformed some party policies which he regarded as being dogmatic. In November 1979, he moderated the JSP's position on the US-Japan Security Treaty, as he claimed on a visit to the United States that if the JSP were given power, the party would not unilaterally override the treaty. In the 1980 general election, the JSP and Komeito entered into a coalition agreement, which resulted in the JSP moving away from the Japanese Communist Party. Atsukata was defeated in the 1983 House of Councillors election, and resigned both from his position as chairman as well as political life in general thereafter.

== Later life and death ==
After retiring from politics, Atsukata spent the rest of his career working as a civilian lawyer. He died on October 11, 1990, at the age of 75 from cerebral infarction.

== Legacy ==
As chairman of the JSP from 1977 to 1983, he attempted to expand the party's membership and realign its platform to a more European-style social democratic model, but was largely unsuccessful in boosting the party's standing; the JSP had only a 13.2% approval rating in December 1977. The JSP also moved a bit towards the political centre under Asukata's leadership. However, his tenure as mayor of Yokohama has left more lasting marks, such as the Minato Mirai 21 urban renewal master plan.

Political offices
Preceded by Kiyoshi Nakarai	Mayor of Yokohama; 1963–1978	Succeeded by Michikazu Saigo
Party political offices
Preceded by Tomomi Narita	Chair of the Japan Socialist Party; 1977–1983	Succeeded by Masashi Ishibashi
