= Tagaya =

- Language: Japanese

Origin
- Region of origin: Japan

Tagaya is a Japanese surname. Notable people with the surname include:

- Shinnen Tagaya (多賀谷 真稔; 1920–1995), Japanese politician
- Tagaya clan (結城氏)
