= Itsurō Sakisaka =

Japanese Marxian economist (1897–1985)

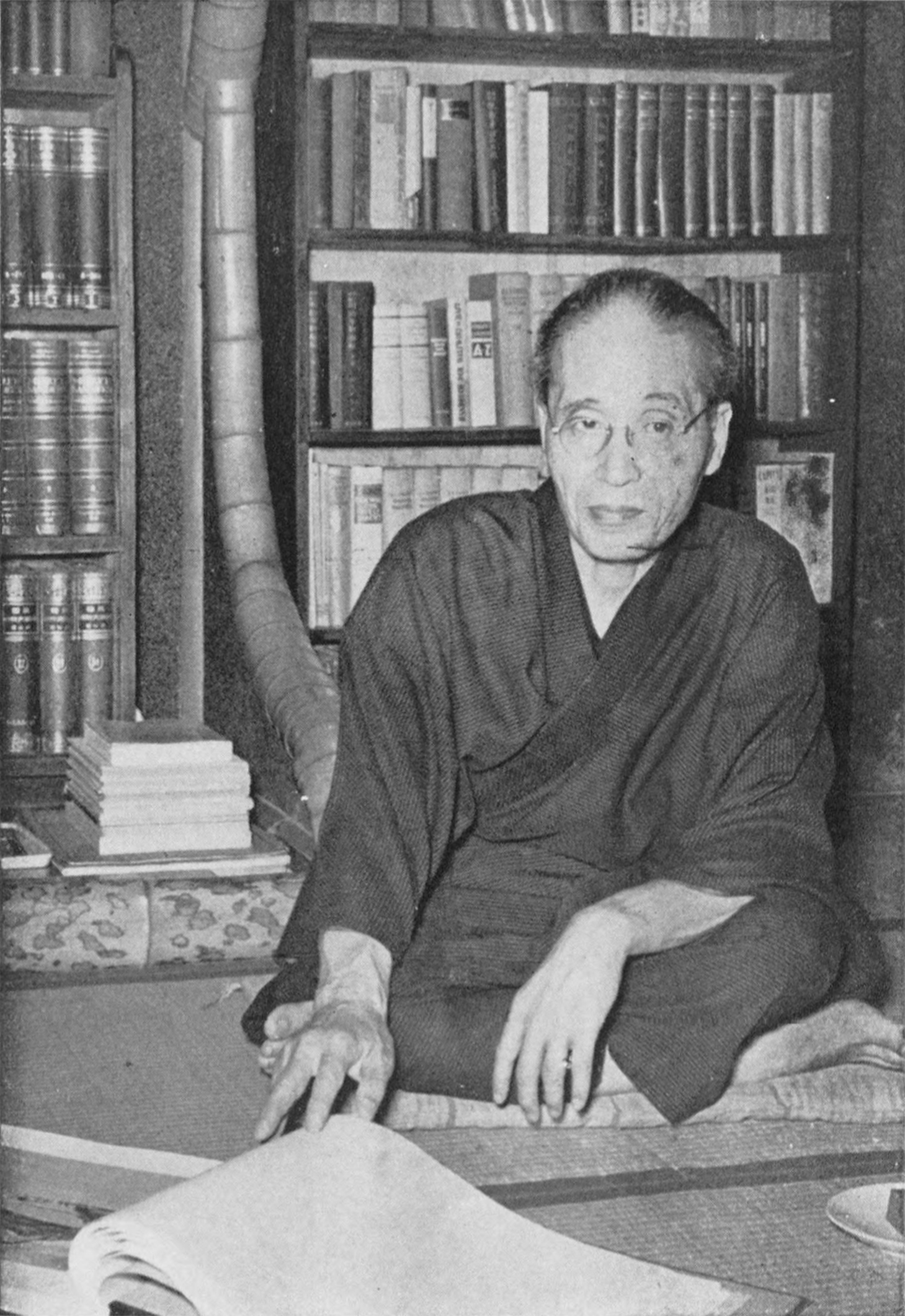
- Born: February 6, 1897; Ōmuta, Fukuoka, Japan
- Died: January 22, 1985 (aged 87)

Academic background
- Education: University of Tokyo
- Influences: Karl Marx

Academic work
- School or tradition: Rōnōha Marxism (Labour-Farmer faction)
- Institutions: Kyushu University
- Notable ideas: Co-founder of the Socialist Association; leading theoretician of the left wing of the Japan Socialist Party

Itsurō Sakisaka (向坂 逸郎, Sakisaka Itsurō) (6 February 1897 – 22 January 1985) was a Japanese Marxian economist and socialist thinker. A professor of economics at Kyushu University, he was a leading theoretician of the left wing of the Japan Socialist Party (JSP) and co-founder and long-time leader of the Socialist Association (Shakaishugi Kyōkai).

== Early life and education ==
Sakisaka was born in Ōmuta, Fukuoka Prefecture, the son of a company employee. He had younger brothers including the economist Masao Sakizaka and the Waseda University professor Hachirō Yamazaki. He attended Fukuoka Prefectural Yame Middle School (transferring temporarily to Hokkaido Prefectural Otaru Middle School), then Fukuoka Prefectural Kokura Middle School, and the Fifth Higher School before graduating from the Economics Department of Tokyo Imperial University (now the University of Tokyo) in 1921. While a student at the Fifth Higher School he began reading the works of Karl Marx in order to study German and became a Marxist.

== Study in Germany and early academic career ==
From November 1922 to May 1925 Sakisaka studied in Berlin. During the hyperinflation in the Weimar Republic he was able to purchase large numbers of Marxist works at low prices with foreign currency; this formed the basis of his later extensive collection of Marxist literature. He became engaged to Yuki Mine in October 1922 and married her in June 1925 after returning to Japan (with the economist Takao Tsuchiya and his wife as matchmakers).

Upon his return he was appointed assistant professor at Kyushu Imperial University and was promoted to full professor in 1926. He became a prominent member of the coterie around the magazine Rōnō and one of Japan’s leading Marxian economists.

== Prewar repression ==
In 1928, amid intensifying repression of socialism and communism under the revised Peace Preservation Law, Sakisaka was forced to resign from Kyushu University together with professors Hiroo Sasaki and Tomoyuki Ishihama. He moved to Tokyo and participated in the editing and translation of the complete works of Marx and Engels published by Kaizōsha. In the late 1920s and 1930s he was a leading spokesman of the Rōnōha (Labour-Farmer faction) in the debate on Japanese capitalism and the ground-rent controversy; his contributions were collected in works such as Chidai-ron kenkyū (Studies on Ground Rent) and Nihon shihonshugi no shomondai (Problems of Japanese Capitalism).

In 1937 he was arrested and imprisoned in connection with the first Popular Front Incident. After release on bail he was banned from publishing or speaking publicly. He translated German books anonymously and lived by operating a small home farm. Unlike many comrades who underwent tenkō (ideological conversion) under pressure, Sakisaka neither actively supported the wartime militarist regime nor was forced into a formal conversion, though he also did not engage in open resistance. Contemporaries including his disciple Tsunehisa Kojima and the historian Kentarō Hayashi later evaluated his wartime conduct positively.

== Postwar academic and theoretical activity ==
After Japan’s defeat, Marxist research and socialist activity became legal under the Allied occupation. In 1946 Sakisaka published “On Historical Laws,” early advocating a peaceful form of socialist revolution in Japan, and resumed his professorship at Kyushu University (teaching mainly in the second half of each academic year while based in Tokyo). Major theoretical works from this period include Keizaigaku hōhōron (Methodology of Economics, 1949), Marukusu keizaigaku no hōhō (The Method of Marxian Economics, 1959), Marukusu keizaigaku no kihon mondai (Fundamental Problems of Marxian Economics, 1962), and a biography of Marx (1962). He translated Das Kapital (Iwanami Bunko, 1947 onward) and, with Hyōei Ōuchi, The Communist Manifesto (1951). With colleagues and disciples he edited the Marx-Engels Selected Works (Shinchōsha, 12 volumes + 4 supplementary volumes, 1956–1962).

== Socialist Association and the Japan Socialist Party ==
In 1951 Sakisaka co-founded the Socialist Association with Hitoshi Yamakawa and others; it became the main theoretical support of the left wing of the Japan Socialist Party. After the 1950–55 split of the JSP he was a leading theorist of the Left Socialist Party and contributed to its programme. When Yamakawa died in 1958, Sakisaka became the unchallenged leader of the Association.

A charismatic lecturer, he regularly taught Das Kapital to party members and trade-union activists at his home and travelled to study sessions across Japan. He was particularly active in educating activists at the Miike Coal Mine in Fukuoka. In December 1958 he published the so-called “Sakisaka Thesis,” a sharp attack (without naming him) on right-wing Socialist leader Suehiro Nishio, criticising the 1955 reunification of the party and arguing that a genuine socialist revolution could be carried out only by the working class. The polemic contributed to the departure of Nishio and other right-wing members to form the Democratic Socialist Party in January 1960.

Sakisaka provided theoretical guidance for the 1960 Miike Struggle, the longest and most bitter postwar labour conflict in Japan, which ended in defeat for the miners but greatly enhanced his influence among activists. In the 1960s he opposed Saburō Eda’s “structural reform” line as opportunistic, allying with the faction of Kōzō Sasaki to expand the Association’s influence inside the JSP. In 1967 the Socialist Association split into the Sakisaka faction and the faction of Kaoru Ōta; the Sakisaka group soon became dominant and is generally what is meant by “Socialist Association.” The 1968 “Socialist Association Thesis” (sometimes called the culmination of Sakisaka’s theorising) strongly reflected his views.

From the late 1960s Sakisaka developed close ties with the Soviet Union and other Eastern-bloc states, supporting the 1968 invasion of Czechoslovakia and the 1979–80 invasion of Afghanistan. In interviews he stated that under the dictatorship of the proletariat there would be no freedom of expression opposing the government and suggested that a socialist Japan would revise the constitution, rearm, and join the Warsaw Pact. Critics argued that his continued emphasis on prewar Rōnōha Marxism led him to overlook the social changes brought by Japan’s high economic growth and that the Association’s dominance contributed to the JSP’s long-term decline.

== Later years and controversies ==
In the mid-1970s the Association’s growing power provoked a backlash. In 1974 Sasaki and Eda formed a “Committee of Seven” opposed to the Association. At the February 1977 JSP congress Association activists verbally attacked Eda, who soon left to form the Socialist Citizens’ League (later part of the Socialist Democratic Federation) and died shortly afterward. Under pressure from Sōhyō (the General Council of Trade Unions of Japan), which was moving toward labour-management cooperation, the JSP imposed regulations on the Association in autumn 1977. At its 11th congress in 1978 the Association formally accepted the status of a purely theoretical study group that would refrain from political activity.

In a 1978 interview with the gay activist Ken Tōgō published in Shūkan Post, Sakisaka made derogatory remarks about Tōgō’s sexuality; Tōgō walked out. The Social Democratic Party and the Socialist Association later apologised for the remarks. In his final years many of Sakisaka’s academic associates shifted toward Western-style social democracy and left him; he struggled to maintain the Association’s cohesion.

Sakisaka died on 22 January 1985 at the age of 87. His large collection of Marxist literature was donated to the Ohara Institute for Social Research at Hosei University. The family home in Saginomiya, Nakano, Tokyo, which had served as a venue for study groups, was also donated and later replaced by the Hosei University Itsurō Sakisaka Memorial International Exchange Hall (opened 2010). He and his wife Yuki (who died in 2007 at age 102) had no children; copyright in his works passed to caregivers.

=== Iwanami Bunko Das Kapital translation controversy ===
In 1983 the translator Jirō Okazaki, who had collaborated on Sakisaka’s Iwanami Bunko edition of Das Kapital, published a memoir claiming that the translation was essentially his own work, that he had been listed only as an assistant, and that after an initial royalty-sharing arrangement Sakisaka induced him to renounce his rights. Sakisaka’s widow later stated that Iwanami had refused joint attribution and that royalties had in fact been shared. Subsequent research by biographer Yasuyuki Ishikawa and others concluded that the dispute arose largely from mutual misunderstanding and that Sakisaka committed no serious ethical breach.

In May 2026 the complete works of Itsurō Sakisaka (16 volumes) began publication with Junpōsha.

== Selected works ==
- Keizaigaku hōhōron (Methodology of Economics), Kawade Shobō, 1949
- Marukusu keizaigaku no hōhō (The Method of Marxian Economics), Iwanami Shoten, 1959
- Marukusu keizaigaku no kihon mondai (Fundamental Problems of Marxian Economics), Iwanami Shoten, 1962
- Marukusu-den (Biography of Marx), Shinchōsha, 1962
- Translations of Das Kapital and (with Hyōe Ōuchi) The Communist Manifesto for Iwanami Bunko
- Editor, Marx-Engels Selected Works, Shinchōsha, 1956–1962

== Bibliography ==
- Kapur, Nick (2018). Japan at the Crossroads: Conflict and Compromise after Anpo. Cambridge, Massachusetts: Harvard University Press. pp. 111–112.
- 坂本守『向坂逸郎・ゆき 叛骨の昭和史』西日本新聞社、1982
- 上野建一・石河康国ほか『山川均・向坂逸郎外伝 労農派 1925-1985』（上・下）社会主義協会、2002・2004
- 小島恒久『向坂逸郎 その人と思想』えるむ書房 2005
- 佐藤優・山崎耕一郎『マルクスと日本人』明石書店 2015
- 石河康国『向坂逸郎評伝』上巻1897～1950、下巻1951～1985 社会評論社 2018
