= Chairman of the Japan Socialist Party =

Leadership position of the Japan Socialist Party

Chairman of the Japan Socialist Party (中央執行委員会委員長, Chūō Shikkō Iinkai Iinchō) was the highest responsible position, equivalent to party leader, in the Japan Socialist Party (JSP), which existed from 1945 to 1996.

== Overview ==
The position produced two Prime Ministers of Japan: Tetsu Katayama and Tomiichi Murayama. Under the 1955 System, as the leader of the largest opposition party, the chairman's statements and actions attracted significant attention.

Initially, the chairman was elected by delegates at the party congress. From 1978 onward, it was chosen by direct election among party members.

Although the chairman was the party's top executive, their control was not particularly strong. The party was divided between left-wing and right-wing factions, and a customary practice emerged where if the chairman came from one faction, the secretary-general would come from the opposing faction to balance power. Lower executive positions were selected by the party congress with similar factional balance in mind, often resulting in officials whose views differed from the chairman's. At the 41st continued party congress in 1977, the chairman was authorized to appoint non-standing central executive committee members.

Following the assassination of Inejirō Asanuma, secretary-general Saburō Eda was promoted to acting chairman. Although he never formally assumed the position of chairman, party histories and records treat him as equivalent in status.

In 1996, the Japan Socialist Party changed its name to the Social Democratic Party, where the top leader is called "party leader" (党首, tōshu) rather than chairman.

== List of Chairmen of the Japan Socialist Party ==
No.	Chairman	Term
Chairman of the Central Executive Committee of the Japan Socialist Party
1	Tetsu Katayama	September 28, 1946 – January 16, 1950
Chairman of the Japan Socialist Party (Left)
—	Mosaburō Suzuki	January 19, 1951 – October 12, 1955
Chairman of the Japan Socialist Party (Right)
—	Jōtarō Kawakami	August 25, 1952 – October 12, 1955
Chairman of the Japan Socialist Party (Unified Left-Right)
2	Mosaburō Suzuki	October 13, 1955 – March 21, 1960
3	Inejirō Asanuma	March 23, 1960 – October 12, 1960
—	Saburō Eda (acting chairman)	October 12, 1960 – March 6, 1961
4	Jōtarō Kawakami	March 6, 1961 – May 6, 1965
5	Kōzō Sasaki	May 6, 1965 – August 19, 1967
6	Seiichi Katsumata	August 19, 1967 – October 4, 1968
7	Tomomi Narita	November 30, 1968 – December 13, 1977
8	Ichio Asukata	December 13, 1977 – September 7, 1983
9	Masashi Ishibashi	September 7, 1983 – September 8, 1986
10	Takako Doi	September 8, 1986 – July 31, 1991
11	Makoto Tanabe	July 31, 1991 – January 19, 1993
12	Sadao Yamahana	January 19, 1993 – September 25, 1993
13	Tomiichi Murayama	September 25, 1993 – January 19, 1996

- indicates those who became Prime Minister during their term.
- indicates the representative at the time the Japan Socialist Party gained power in government.
- indicates the representative at the time the Japan Socialist Party lost power.

== Results of Chairman Elections ==
The chairman position was often decided through prior negotiations between factions, resulting in many uncontested or unanimous selections; contested elections were relatively few.

Date of vote	Result
March 24, 1960	Inejirō Asanuma 228 votes, Jōtarō Kawakami 206 votes
January 22, 1966	Kōzō Sasaki 295 votes, Saburō Eda 276 votes
December 9, 1966	Kōzō Sasaki 313 votes, Saburō Eda 274 votes
December 2, 1970	Tomomi Narita 207 votes, Saburō Eda 148 votes
November 27, 1981	Ichio Asukata 39,379 votes, Yamaji Mutō 14,721 votes, Masakazu Shimodaira 3,425 votes
September 6, 1986	Takako Doi 58,670 votes, Satoshi Ueda 11,748 votes
July 30, 1991	Makoto Tanabe 46,363 votes, Satoshi Ueda 36,358 votes
September 20, 1993	Tomiichi Murayama 65,446 votes, Masatoshi Itō 18,075 votes
January 17, 1996	Tomiichi Murayama 57,591 votes, Tadatoshi Akiba 10,440 votes

== See also ==
- Japan Socialist Party
