= Sakisaka =

Sakisaka (written: 向坂 or 咲坂) is a Japanese surname. Notable people with the surname include:

- Io Sakisaka (咲坂 伊緒), Japanese manga artist
- Itsurō Sakisaka (向坂 逸郎, 1897–1985), Japanese Marxian economist
