= Mao Zedong thanking Japan controversy =

Political controversy in China

Mao Zedong, the longtime Chairman of the Chinese Communist Party and the founder of the People's Republic of China, repeatedly thanked Japanese military and political figures who visited China in the 1950s and 1970s. Mao said that the Japanese invasion of China had united Chinese people and allowed the Chinese Communist Party to win the Chinese Civil War.

In the 21st century, these remarks by Mao caused strong reactions on the internet in China. With the 2020 Hong Kong Diploma of Secondary Education Examination (HKDSE) history subject controversy on the historical understanding of Japan's invasion of China, these remarks have returned to the spotlight on Hong Kong and mainland Chinese websites. The word "thanks" expressed by Mao has been also interpreted by some observers as dark humour.

== Controversial remarks excerpts ==
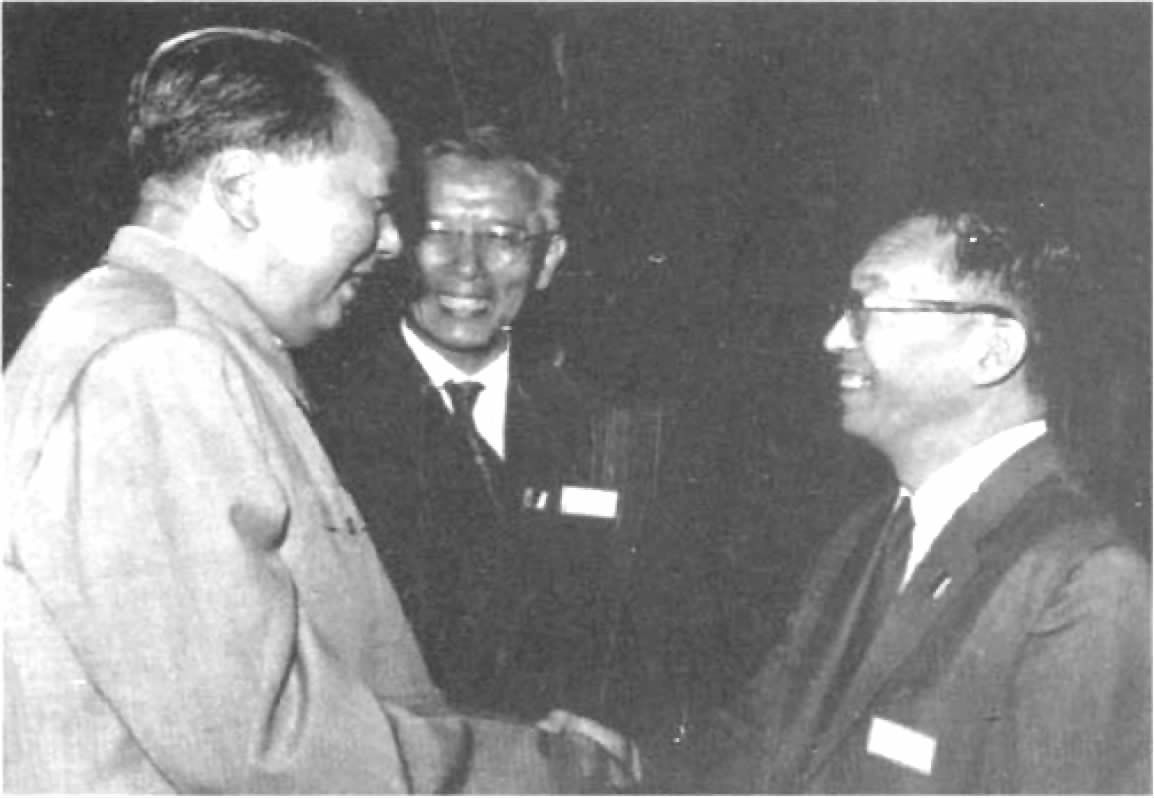
Zhou Peiyuan accompanied Mao Zedong to meet with Sakata Shoichi, head of the Japanese delegation in August 1964

When Chairman Mao Zedong talked with former Japanese Lieutenant General Endo Saburō, who visited China in 1956, he said "You are also our gentlemen, and we want to thank you. It is really you who have fought this war, educated the Chinese people and united the scattered Chinese people, so we should be grateful to you."

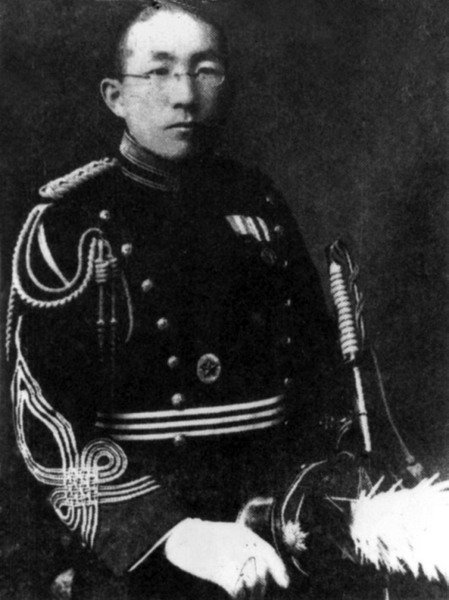
Lt. General Endo Saburō, who led the Imperial Japanese Army Air Service during the Operation 101 and 102 joint-strike bombing campaigns, led a targeted aerial-assassination strike on Generalissimo Chiang Kai-shek on 30 August 1941; he would put forth his Futility of the Chongqing Bombing Thesis (重慶爆擊無用論) days after the failed assassination strike, and gained a reputation as a post-war anti-war pacifist, establishing the China-Japan Servicemen's Devotion Society (日中友好军人协会)

In 1960, when Mao Zedong spoke to a Japanese literary delegation, he mentioned, "I spoke to many Japanese friends about this incident, and some of them said that it was not good for Japan to invade China. I said of course the invasion was bad, but we should not look at this bad side alone, on the other hand, Japan has done us a great favour in China. If Japan had not occupied half of China, the Chinese people would not have awakened. In this respect, we have to 'thank' the Japanese Imperial Army. Who is educating you Japanese people now? It is the U.S. imperialists who are your negative teachers, and they are also our negative teachers. ... It is possible and necessary for our two peoples, China and Japan, to cooperate because both are oppressed by U.S. imperialism and have common positions."

In 1961, Mao Zedong told Japanese Socialist Party advisor Kuroda Hisao: "occupied most of China in the past, so the Chinese people received an education. Without the Chinese War of Resistance against Japan, the Chinese people would not have been enlightened nor would they have been united, so that we would still be in the mountains and would not be able to go to Beijing to see Peking Opera. It was because the Japanese imperial army had occupied most of China and there was no other way out for the Chinese people that they became aware and started armed struggle, establishing many anti-Japanese bases and creating the conditions for victory in the subsequent war of liberation. The Japanese monopoly capital and warlords did a 'good deed' for us, and I would like to thank the Japanese warlords if I need to thank them." In the conversation, Mao also expressed the meaning that "the relationship with the people should be treated differently from the relationship with the government" and that "the monopoly capitalist government and militarists in Japan should be responsible, but the Japanese people should not be responsible."

On 9 July 1964, Mao Zedong talked with the visiting delegates from Asia, Africa, and Oceania to China who attended the Second Asian Economic Symposium about Nango Saburō: "After our liberation, a Japanese capitalist named Sanjuro Nango talked to me once and said, 'I am very sorry that Japan has invaded you.' I said, 'No, if Japanese imperialism had not launched a massive invasion and overrun half of China, the entire Chinese people would not have been able to unite against imperialism and the Chinese Communist Party would not have won.' In fact, Japanese imperialism served as a good instructor for us. First, it weakened Chiang Kai-shek; second, we developed the Communist-led bases and armies. Before the war, our army had reached 300,000, but due to our own mistakes, it was reduced to more than 20,000. In the middle of the eight-year war, our army grew to one million two hundred thousand men. You see, didn't Japan do us a great favour? This favour was not done by the Japanese Communist Party, but by Japanese militarism. Because the Japanese Communist Party did not invade us, but the Japanese monopoly capital and its militarist government invaded us.

On 10 July 1964, Mao Zedong met and conversed with several Japanese Socialist Party members who were visiting China. Among them were: Sasaki Kōzō, Kuroda Hisao and Hosomugi Kanemitsu.

a) Mao Zedong: "I once talked to my Japanese friends. They said, I am very sorry that the Japanese Imperial Army invaded China. I said: No! Without your imperial army invading half of China, the Chinese people would not have been able to unite against you, and the Chinese Communist Party would not have been able to seize power. So the Japanese Imperial Army has been a good instructor for us, and for you. ..."

Sasaki: "Today I heard a very magnanimous speech from Chairman Mao. In the past, Japanese militarism invaded China and caused you a lot of damage, and we all feel very sorry for that."

b) Mao: "There is nothing to be sorry about. Japanese militarism brought great benefit to China and enabled the Chinese people to seize power, and without your imperial army, we could not have seized power. This, I have a different opinion from yours, and the two of us are at odds." (Laughter, the room livens up)

Sasaki: "Thank you."

c) Mao Zedong: "... Chiang Kai-shek was the first person who taught me to fight, and that means this time. Once we fought, we fought for ten years. We grew from no army to an army of 300,000 men, and I ended up making my own mistakes, which cannot be blamed on Chiang Kai-shek. We lost all our southern bases and had to carry out the 25,000-mile Long March. Here, there is me, and (my) comrade Liao Chengzhi. How many troops were left? It was reduced from 300,000 to 25,000. Why should we thank the Imperial Japanese Army? It was the Japanese Imperial Army that came, and we fought the Japanese Imperial Army before we cooperated with Chiang Kai-shek again. After eight years of fighting with 25,000 troops, we have grown to 1.2 million troops and a base area of 100 million people. Do you say be thankful?"

On 18 December 1970, Mao Zedong revealed to American journalist Edgar Snow that "Those Japanese are really good, the Chinese revolution cannot work without the help of the Japanese. I told this to a Japanese man who was a capitalist named Nango Saburō. He always said, 'I'm sorry for invading you.' I said: 'No, you guys helped a lot, the Japanese militarism and the Emperor of Japan. You occupied half of China, and the Chinese people all rose up to fight against you, and we got a million troops and occupied 100 million people.'"

On 27 September 1972: Mao Zedong said, "We have to thank Japan, without Japan's invasion of China, we would not have been able to achieve the cooperation between the Communist Party of China, we would not have been able to develop and eventually gain power. ... It is with your help that we are able to meet you in Beijing today." When Tanaka Kakuei explained the statement that "Japan's invasion of China has caused a lot of trouble for the Chinese people", Mao said, "That's good, so that's how your statement about adding trouble is settled?" Tanaka Kakuei said, "We intend to change it according to Chinese (language) custom (through further talks between Ji Pengfei and Ohira Masayoshi, and in the final communiqué to 'express profound remorse for Japan's responsibility for the serious damage caused to the Chinese people by the war in the past')." Mao said, "If there had been no Japanese invasion of China, there would have been no Communist victory, let alone today's talks. ... This is the dialectic of history."
