= Left Socialist Party of Japan =

Left Socialist Party of Japan 社会党左派 Shakaitō-saha
- Chairperson: Mosaburō Suzuki
- Secretary-General: Hiroo Wada
- Founded: 1951; 75 years ago
- Dissolved: 1955; 71 years ago
- Split from: Japan Socialist Party
- Merged into: Japan Socialist Party (1955)
- Headquarters: Tokyo, Japan
- Ideology: Anti-Stalinism; Nonviolent revolution; Revolutionary socialism; Rōnōha Marxism
- Colors: Red

The Left Socialist Party of Japan (社会党左派, Shakaitō-saha) generally referred to the faction within the Japan Socialist Party that prioritized a political line based on prewar Labour-Farmer faction Marxism over building a welfare state within the framework of capitalist market economy. Even factions considered left-leaning, such as the "Society for Creating a New Socialist Party," were sometimes close to social democracy. The term also specifically denotes the separate Left Socialist Party of Japan that existed as an independent party from 1951 to 1955 after a major split in the JSP.

Following the signing of the San Francisco Peace Treaty in 1951, the Japan Socialist Party dissolved into chaos and internal bickering between moderate reformist socialists and more radical revolutionary socialists over the issue of whether or not to support the Treaty. The JSP split, with some of its members forming a more centrist social-democratic party, while others formed a more radical socialist party. Both groups claimed the name Nihon Shakaitō (日本社会党) but different English translations, and are known as the Left Socialist Party of Japan and the Right Socialist Party of Japan, respectively.

The left-wing in Japan was in chaos between 1951 and 1955. In early 1955, the Left and Right Socialists reconciled and merged to reform the JSP, months before the Liberal Democratic Party was created through a merger of the Liberal and Democrat parties. The Left Socialists generally had the upper hand in the reunified JSP, causing a few former Right Socialists to leave the party in 1960 to create the Democratic Socialist Party.

== Definition and evolution ==
- From founding through the 1960s: politicians and activists from the prewar Rōnōha faction, Labour-Farmer Party, or Japan Proletarian Party lineages, plus the Hiroo Wada faction that joined the Left during the 1951 split. Characterized by one-stage revolution theory and peaceful revolution.
- After the structural reform debate: factions opposing structural reform theory, such as the Kōzō Sasaki faction and the Socialist Association. While affiliated with the Socialist International, they were generally negative toward European-style social democracy. Some viewed the Left-dominant JSP line as "Japanese-style social democracy."
- After the Murayama cabinet: media conveniently called groups supporting Murayama the "left wing."

== History ==
=== From Founding to the 1951 Split ===
At founding, the JSP executive was dominated by the Shakai Taishūtō and Japan Labour-Farmer Party right-wing lineages, leaving the left wing a small minority. It often acted as an intra-party opposition to the Katayama and Ashida cabinets, contributing to the loss of power. However, the Shōwa Denkō scandal in the late Ashida cabinet raised the left’s reputation for policy insight. After the Morito–Inamura dispute, left-winger Mosaburō Suzuki became secretary-general, increasing its influence.

The party’s original programmatic document was the three-point Japan Socialist Party Platform adopted at the founding congress on 2 November 1945, which affirmed democracy, the rejection of capitalism in favour of socialism, and opposition to militarism in pursuit of permanent peace.

==== Main politicians of this period ====
- Mosaburō Suzuki — Consistently critical of the Katayama and Ashida cabinets. Later second chairman. Famous for the anti-war speech "Young people, do not take up guns. Women, do not send your husbands and sons to the battlefield." His anti-war thought was later developed into the unarmed neutrality theory by Sanshichi Hanyū.
- Kanjū Katō — Founded the Japan Proletarian Party prewar, opposed fascism, and consistently opposed war. Critical of the Katayama cabinet but joined the Ashida cabinet as Labor Minister. Supported the San Francisco Peace Treaty and joined the Right Socialist Party in the split. After reunification, served as Control Commission chairman.
- Hisao Kuroda — Expelled from the JSP for opposing the Ashida cabinet budget; formed the Labourers and Farmers Party.
- Tenkoko Sonoda — Joined Kuroda in forming the Labourers and Farmers Party but later left. Had an affair with Sunao Sonoda and joined the LDP. Engaged in a bitter family dispute with Sunao's son from his previous marriage.
- Tenrei Ōta — Moved from JCP to JSP to Labourers and Farmers Party. Controversial for advocating euthanasia, suicide, abortion, and sterilization for the elderly and disabled.
- Umeichi Adachi — Expelled from JSP in 1948; co-formed the National Liaison Conference for JSP Reconstruction in 1951 with Toshiaki Wada and others. Called himself a "patriot," labeled conservative parties and JSP right wing as "traitors," and sought to rebuild the JSP as a socialist party while building a united front with the Labourers and Farmers Party and JCP.
- Satoko Togano — From Tomisaburō Hashimoto's Japan Democratic Party; originally linked to the Kawakami faction (right wing) but later viewed as left wing. Contributed to pursuing the Diet Kiss Incident and passage of the Prostitution Prevention Law.
- Yoshimori Fukasawa — From the Japan Farmers' Union. Joined the unified faction in the union split; clashed with right-winger Rikizō Hirano and moved to the JCP.
- Tōmin Suzuki — Moved from JCP to Workers and Farmers Party. Led labor movement at Yomiuri Shimbun; later mayor and city councilor of Kamaishi.

=== Left Socialist Party (1951–1955) ===
The 14th Congress of the left-wing Socialist Party was held at Toshima Public Hall from September 19th to 20th, 1955. Among the participants were Jiichirō Matsumoto and Hiroo Wada.

In 1951, the JSP split over the San Francisco Peace Treaty and the (old) Japan-U.S. Security Treaty. The faction opposing both treaties was called the "Left Socialist Party" (abbreviated "Left Socialist"). Both sides claimed the name Japan Socialist Party. In the Diet, they were distinguished by office numbers (Right initially "Japan Socialist Party"; Left "Japan Socialist Party, Room 23").

The Chairman: Mosaburō Suzuki. The Secretary-General: Masaru Nomizo (replaced by Hiroo Wada in 1954).

Supported by the General Council of Trade Unions of Japan (Sōhyō), it conducted organized elections and was called the "organized left society." It advocated unarmed neutrality, opposed rearmament and the reverse course, defended the Constitution, and gained support especially from women and white-collar workers.

In October 1955, the left-wing and right-wing Socialist Parties agreed to reunify. Right-wing leader Jōtarō Kawakami and left-wing leader Mosaburō Suzuki shake hands while Inejirō Asanuma applauds.

It started with 16 seats, rose to 54 in 1952, 72 in 1953 (surpassing the Right), and 89 in 1955, establishing left-wing dominance. Reunification occurred on 13 October 1955. Suzuki became chairman of the unified JSP, but Wada (who opposed reunification) was excluded from the top seven posts.

In January 1954 the Left Socialist Party adopted the Left Socialist Platform. At the October 1955 reunification congress a compromise document, the Unified Socialist Party Platform, was adopted as the official platform of the reunified Japan Socialist Party, replacing both the Left and Right platforms.

==== Main politicians of this period ====
- Junzō Inamura — Entered politics from the agrarian movement. Submitted a policy outline positioning the JSP as a "class party" in the Morito–Inamura debate, becoming a theoretical pillar of the left. Co-drafted the Left Socialist Party Platform with Itsurō Sakisaka and Kōdō Itō; became organization director but died suddenly just before reunification.
- Hiroo Wada — Unusual bureaucrat-turned-leftist. Sometimes took dogmatic positions to counter Suzuki. After reunification, received few posts and retired without fully demonstrating his abilities.
- Kei Hoashi — Bureaucrat/business background. Initially belonged to the Ryokufūkai. Later formed the "Japan Socialist Party Party Reform League."

=== After the Structural Reform Debate ===
Kōzō Sasaki (a powerful Suzuki-faction figure) allied with the Socialist Association to criticize Saburō Eda's structural reform theory, sparking fierce factional strife that became an "anti-Eda" campaign. The Sasaki faction deepened ties with China and the Socialist Association with the Soviet Union, eroding public trust in the left's unarmed neutrality policy.

In the 1970s the Socialist Association gained strength among activists with radical positions (including affirming the dictatorship of the proletariat). After Eda's 1977 departure and death, the right wing and China faction condemned the Association, forcing it to limit itself to theoretical research. Right-wing influence rose, and under left-wing chairmen the party's ideology and line were revised according to right-wing demands. The 1986 "New Declaration of the Japan Socialist Party" largely ended left-wing dominance.

Takako Doi belonged to the right-leaning New Current Group in the 1970s and was not originally a left-winger. Elected chairwoman after Ishibashi’s resignation following the 1986 double election defeat, she took an absolute stance against the consumption tax, leading to JSP gains in the 1989 House of Councillors and 1990 general elections.

==== Main politicians of this period ====
- Toyojirō Fujiwara — From Ichikawa city assembly to old Chiba 1st district. Promoted Japan-China friendship; later formed the "Japan Socialist Party China faction."
- Kōzō Sasaki — Cooperated with the Socialist Association for persistent anti-Eda attacks but later had his base eroded by the Association. Reconciled with Eda and formed an anti-Association group.
- Tomomi Narita — Chairman. Declared, "We will not take the welfare state road. We will go with socialism." Insensitive to changes in European socialism. Visited North Korea by ship across the Sea of Japan without using a third country.
- Tokuji Kameda — Narita's ally; opposed the JSP–Kōmeitō coalition idea and Shakōmin route, left the party. Promoted cooperation with the JCP and became a representative convener of the National Council for Peace, Democracy, and Innovation.
- Noboru Baba — Vice-chairman. Representative of the intermediate-left "Japan Socialist Party New Life Research Association." Skeptical of the Shakōmin route and critical of Chairman Ishibashi’s "Self-Defense Forces unconstitutional but legal" theory.
- Torao Takazawa — Former JCP International faction student activist with Tetsuzo Fuwa and others. Joined the Socialist Association in the JSP ("Prince of the Association"). Ran unsuccessfully for Nerima ward mayor with LDP recommendation in later years.
- Takako Doi — Sparked the "Madonna Boom" amid anti-LDP sentiment but lacked governing strategy, making the boom short-lived.

=== Murayama Cabinet ===
Anti-communist Murayama and his circle originally belonged to the right wing. Although Murayama was in the Left Socialist Party during the 1951 split, he consistently belonged to the right-leaning All-Japan Prefectural and Municipal Workers Union right wing, Policy Research Group, and Wednesday Club. Key supporters such as Tsuruo Yamaguchi and Shun Oide were right-wing. However, media after the cabinet’s formation conveniently labeled supporters of the LDP–JSP–Sakigake coalition (critical of Ichirō Ozawa and the New Frontier Party) as "left wing," creating an image of Murayama as left-wing. Thus, some right-wingers like Yamaguchi were called left because they supported Murayama.

The Murayama cabinet largely failed to produce distinctively socialist policies (except the Murayama Statement) and instead forced the JSP to change its basic policies. Defenders argue that with only about 70 seats it was impossible to do more, and Murayama tried to maintain JSP identity while blocking the single-member district system that contributed to the party's collapse. Policy changes were ratified at party congresses, so blame cannot fall solely on Murayama or the left.

=== After the Murayama Cabinet ===
Many JSP-origin members in the 1996 Democratic Party of Japan (except figures like Takahiro Yokomichi) came from the left wing. Many staff and organizers who switched to the DPJ hid Socialist Association membership. Most Association members stayed in the Social Democratic Party (SDP) or New Socialist Party. Some internal views hold that those remaining in the Murayama–Doi SDP were more often original right-wingers. Exceptions include right-wingers Makoto Tanabe and Hirotaka Akamatsu who joined the DPJ, and Sadao Yamahana (intermediate-left) who sought to shift the JSP toward realistic social democracy from the 1980s.

The left wing often adapted more quickly than the more inflexible right wing. After the 1998 new DPJ formation, many conservatives joined, diluting the left. The 2017 split and formation of the Constitutional Democratic Party of Japan helped resolve coexistence issues.

The SDP (JSP successor) initially promoted a mix of Western social democracy and conservative-liberal elements. The New Socialist Party (inheriting left positions) steadily lost seats and votes after 1996–1998, failing to field candidates in 2003. The SDP's 2006 declaration largely returned to pre-Murayama policies, emphasizing constitutional defense and confrontation with the LDP, but became squeezed between DPJ-aligned opposition and the JCP, declining to near loss of party status in the 2010s.

In May 1995, shortly before its transformation into the Social Democratic Party, the Japan Socialist Party adopted the 95 Declaration (95 Declaration – New Basic Values and Policy Goals), which set out basic values of justice, coexistence, peace and creativity and medium-term policy goals for a post-Cold War “mature society.”

==== Main politicians of this period ====
- Tatsukuni Komori — Led Buraku Liberation League as secretary-general; later New Socialist Party chairman.
- Hideko Itō — Moved from JCP to JSP, elected to the House of Representatives. Prominent left commentator; ran unsuccessfully for Hokkaido governor with LDP recommendation at Koko Sato's request. Later joined the People's New Party.
- Koken Nosaka — Murayama aide; as Construction Minister approved operation of the Nagara River estuary weir, drawing strong criticism from environmentalists.
- Osamu Yatabe — Ibaraki JSP prefectural head and House of Councillors caucus chairman. Expelled for criticizing the LDP–JSP–Sakigake coalition; co-founded the New Socialist Party with Komori and others. First chairman. Gained fame pursuing the 1974 Lockheed scandal.
- Masatoshi Ito — Monk of Shōkōji (Shinshū Ōtani school) in Komatsu, Ishikawa. Opposed Murayama's LDP rapprochement as councillor; ran for JSP chairmanship in 1993 but lost heavily. Left and joined the New Party Constitutional Liberals, but clashed with Hideo Den and Masao Kunihiro over their anti-Ozawa/anti-New Frontier stance and LDP cooperation. Left again, founded the "Constitutional Defense Green Farmers' Solidarity" party. Later active in the New Socialist Party.

Local organizations retained strong old left-wing forces such as the Socialist Association. As of the 2020s, former Left Socialist Party politicians and activists are mainly in the Social Democratic Party, New Socialist Party, and Constitutional Democratic Party of Japan.

== Election results ==
=== House of Representatives ===
Election	Leader	Votes	%	Seats	+/–	Position	Status
1952	Mosaburō Suzuki	3,398,597	9.62	54 / 466	new	4th	Opposition
1953	Mosaburō Suzuki	4,516,715	13.05	72 / 446	▲18	3rd	Opposition
1955	Mosaburō Suzuki	5,683,312	15.35	89 / 446	▲17	3rd	Opposition

=== House of Councillors ===
Election	Leader	Constituency			Party list			Seats		Position	Status
Election	Leader	Votes	%	Seats	Votes	%	Seats	Won	Total	Position	Status
1953	Mosaburō Suzuki	3,917,837	13.99	10 / 75	3,858,552	14.27	8 / 53	18 / 128	40 / 250	2nd	Opposition

== See also ==
- 95 Declaration of the Japan Socialist Party
- Itsurō Sakisaka
- Japan Socialist Party Platform (1945)
- Left Socialist Party Platform (Japan)
- List of political parties in Japan
- Politics of Japan
- Unified Socialist Party Platform
