= Tomomi Narita =

Japanese politician

- 成田 知巳
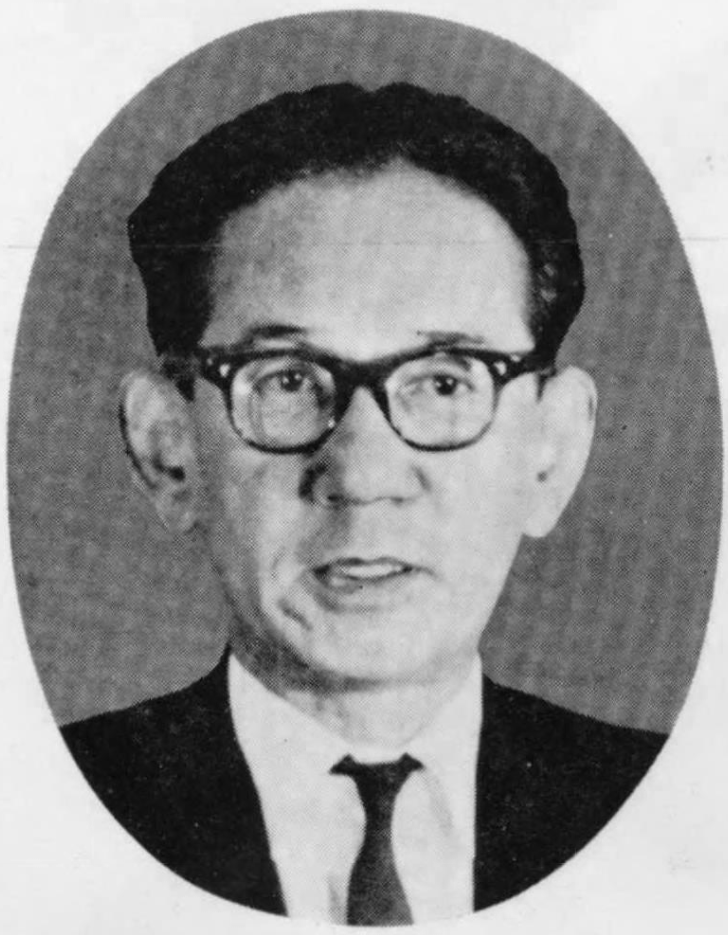
- Narita in 1965

Chairman of the Japan Socialist Party
- In office 30 November 1968 – 13 December 1977
- Preceded by: Seiichi Katsumata
- Succeeded by: Ichio Asukata

Member of the House of Representatives
- In office 26 April 1947 – 9 March 1979
- Preceded by: Constituency established
- Succeeded by: Tan Maekawa
- Constituency: Kagawa 1st

Personal details
- Born: 15 September 1912 Takamatsu, Kagawa, Japan
- Died: 9 March 1979 (aged 66) Meguro, Tokyo, Japan
- Party: Socialist
- Other political affiliations: LSP (1951–1955)
- Education: Tokyo Imperial University

Tomomi Narita (成田 知巳, Narita Tomomi; 15 September 1912 – 9 March 1979) was a Japanese politician who served as the chairman for the Japan Socialist Party from 1968 to 1977. He also served in a few other capacities, such as Chief of the Policy Deliberation Group and Secretary General.

== Early life ==
Narita was born in Takamatsu, Kagawa, as the son of Takaji Narita, who worked for Takamatsu city council members by being a fertiliser dealer. He attended the school which today is known as Takamatsu High School. and from there went on to the school which today is known as Kanazawa University, and the finally to Tokyo Imperial University. While in Takamatsu, he served as a baseball club manager, where he was one academic grade below Osamu Mihara. After graduating, he began working for the company that today is known as Nippon Coke and Engineering. In 1941, he switched over to Mitsui Chemicals, and then in 1943 he was promoted to the role of Chief for the company's documentation section. When he was attending a fourth high school, he was in the same class as Tokuji Kameda, who would later become a House of Councillors member for the Socialist Party.

Narita ran as an independent in the 1946 general election but did not win his seat. In the following 1947 general election, he ran again, but this time as a Socialist Party candidate, and won his seat. Thereafter, he would be elected 12 times in a row. Within the Socialist Party itself, he became a member of the Suzuki faction. Following the Socialist Party's reunification in 1955 after a brief era of division between the Rightists and Leftists, Narita became the Chief of the JSP's General Affairs Bureau, and in 1960, he became the Chief of the Policy Deliberation Group under party Chairman Inejiro Asanuma.

== As a reformist ==
When the Secretary General Saburo Eda began to advance structural reform theories, Narita approved of it and as a result, Eda and Narita found themselves in the limelight of the mass media. In 1962, when Eda resigned from his position as Secretary General, it was Narita who succeeded him in this position.

However, in contrast to Eda, whose positions had gradually moved closer to the right wing of the party, Narita's views shifted leftwards, and he began to advocate for the "Make War on Structural Reform" movement. On the very first day of 1964, Narita listed the following three weaknesses of the Socialist Party in an article for the Society News newspaper:

- Lack of regular organisational activities
- An image that is too political or governmental
- Over-reliance on labour unions

However, he was unable to prescribe possible resolutions for these issues.

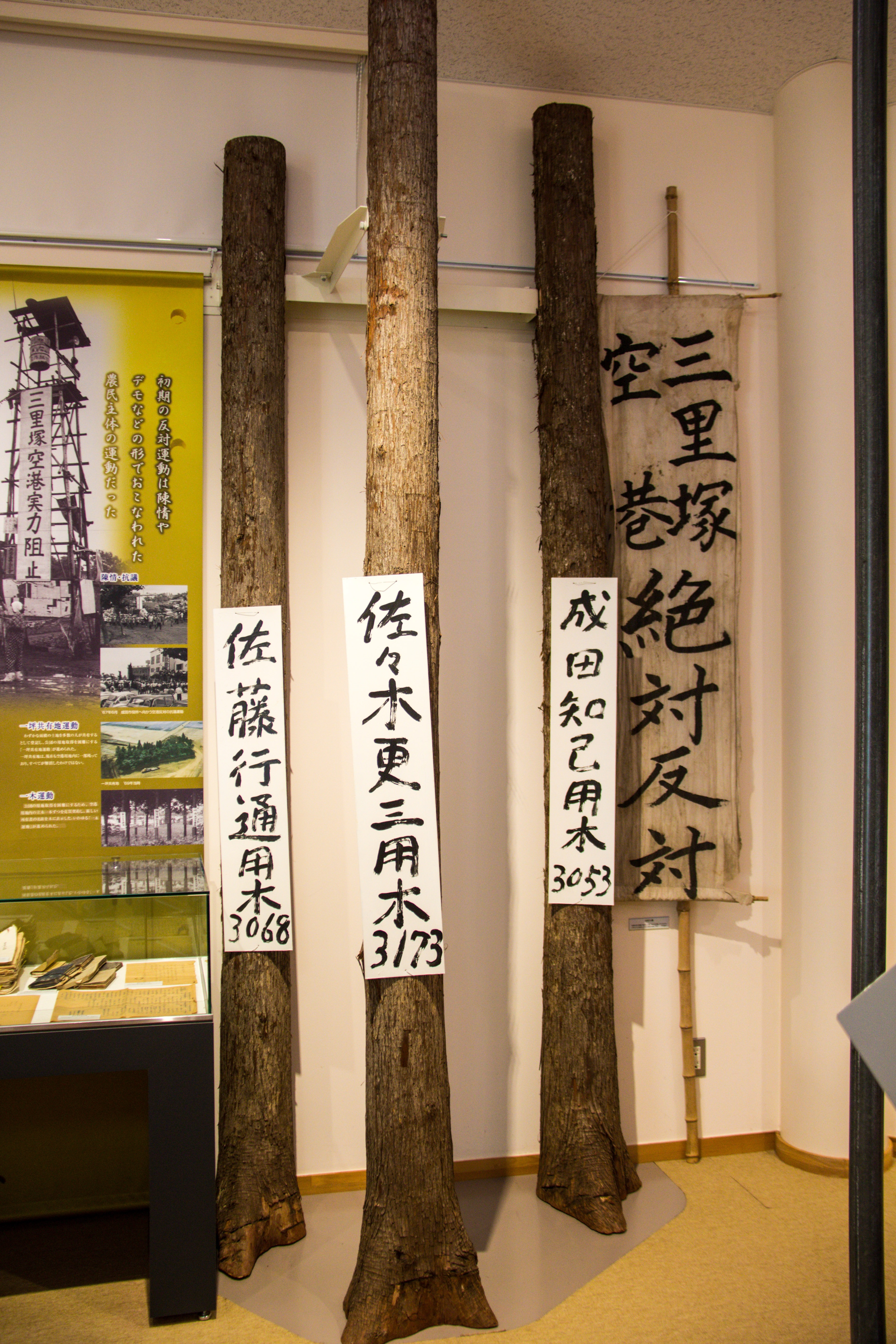
Narita's name, along with Kozo Sasaki and Gyotsu Sato's, can be found on this "standing tree" used in the Sanrizuka Struggle protests.

== JSP Chairman ==
In 1967, following internal party disagreement over a health insurance reform bill which resulted in the resignation of Kōzō Sasaki as Chairman, Narita also resigned as secretary general. However, in August 1968, Chairman Seiichi Katsumata resigned from his position to take responsibility for the JSP's defeats in the 1968 House of Councillors election, and following this Narita became the party Chairman, after which he called on Eda to become Secretary General. Although it was Eda who was above Narita in terms of his political career, but was placed lower than Narita in the JSP's internal affairs, this condition was given the humorous name of "breech birth personnel affairs." In the 1969 general election, Narita campaigned on a platform against "American imperialism" and asked the voters "will you choose the Liberal-Democratic party and war, or the Socialist party and peace and prosperity?" This platform did not pan out and led to a crushing defeat for the JSP in this election.

Following the JSP's crushing defeat in the 1969 general elections, in which the party's total Diet seats (including both houses) fell below 100, Narita signaled his intentions to resign. However, he was not allowed to resign due to the fact that he had the backing of the Sasaki faction and the so-called Socialist Association. When Eda resigned from his post as Secretary General in order to challenge Narita for the position of party Chairman, Masashi Ishibashi was appointed as Secretary General in his stead. From here, the Narita-Ishibashi were the dominant members of the party.

Narita led a JSP delegation to China between 22 October to 3 November in 1971, where he signed a joint statement with Guo Moruo which attacked "the revival of Japanese militarism," as well as the perceived attempt to "seize a Japanese sphere of influence in Asia." In 1973, Narita offered vehement remarks against the Japanese Communist Party after the JCP criticised the JSP for joining other opposition groups (aside from the JCP) in holding secret negotiations with the LDP, referring to their criticisms as "dogmatic and sectarian" attacks which were "'filled with lies."

However, antagonism between Narita's two main power bases began around this time when the Sasaki faction took a pro-China position whereas the Socialist Association took a pro-Soviet position. In 1974, Sasaki and Eda reconciled, and they joined forces into an anti-Socialist Association faction, and the disputes only furthered. Narita proved unable to flex his leadership position in order to quell the internal party friction.

Throughout his tenure as chairman, Japan saw a noted rise in so-called "reformist local governments" (革新自治体), which were local assemblies from throughout the countries that were in control of left-of-center opposition groups. Although many enthusiastic voices in the JSP called for "encircling the city centres from the countryside," the JSP increasingly began to be undercut by Komeito and the Japanese Communist Party, who allied themselves with these progressive local governments from the late 1970's at greater rates.

Narita resigned in 1977 to take responsibility for yet another House of Councillors defeat, and on 9 March 1979, he died suddenly from leukemia.
