= Satoko Togano =

Japanese politician (1908–1971)

- 戸叶 里子
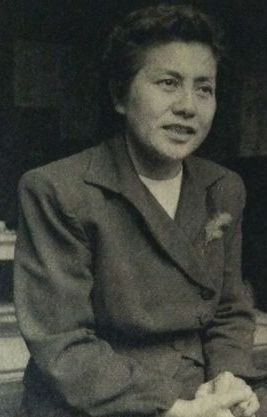
- Togano in 1952

Member of the House of Representatives
- In office 11 April 1946 – 7 November 1971
- Preceded by: Constituency established
- Succeeded by: Seiichi Inaba
- Constituency: Tochigi at-large (1946–1947); Tochigi 1st (1947–1971)

Personal details
- Born: 29 November 1908 Higashichikuma, Nagano, Japan
- Died: 7 November 1971 (aged 62) Shinjuku, Tokyo, Japan
- Party: Socialist
- Other political affiliations: RSP (1951–1955)
- Spouse: Takeshi Togano (m. 1939)
- Education: Doshisha Women's College

Satoko Togano (Japanese: 戸叶里子; 29 November 1908 – 7 November 1971) was a Japanese politician. She was one of the first group of women elected to the House of Representatives in 1946, serving in parliament until her death in 1971.

== Biography ==
Togano was born in Satoyamabe (now part of Matsumoto in 1908, the second daughter of Yoriyoshi Yoshida, a high school headteacher. She studied English at Doshisha University, after which she moved to Tokyo to work in the League of Nations office. In 1930 she married Takeshi Togano, a reporter for The Asahi Shimbun. The following year she became a teacher at the Tokyo Atago English School. In 1939 she transferred to Seiran Girls' Commercial School. In 1940 the couple moved to Shanghai, where Takeshi became a reporter for Tairiku Shinpo. They returned to Japan two years later.

Following the war, the couple relocated to Takeshi's hometown, Utsunomiya in Tochigi Prefecture. Takeshi established the Japanese People's Party with Tomisaburo Hashimoto. However, because he had been a candidate for Tōhōkai in the 1942 elections, he was banned from running for public office. Instead, Satoko ran as a candidate for the party in Tochigi in the 1946 general elections (the first in which women could vote), and was elected to the House of Representatives. After being elected, she joined the Japan Socialist Party. She was re-elected in 1947 and 1949. After joining the Rightist Socialist Party of Japan, she was re-elected in 1952 and 1953. She subsequently rejoined the JSP and was re-elected in 1955, 1958, 1960, 1963, 1967 and 1969. A member of the Jōtarō Kawakami faction of the party, in 1970 she became the first woman to chair the JSP.

In August 1971 Togano was hospitalised due to kidney disease. She died in November the same year and was buried at Tsukiji Hongan-ji.
