= Masashi Ishibashi (politician) =

Japanese politician (1924–2019)

- 石橋 政嗣
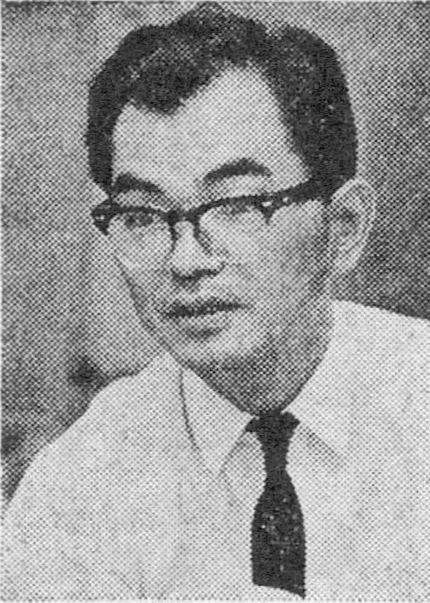
- Ishibashi in 1967

Chairman of the Japan Socialist Party
- In office 7 September 1983 – 8 September 1986
- Preceded by: Ichio Asukata
- Succeeded by: Takako Doi

Member of the House of Representatives
- In office 27 February 1955 – 24 January 1990
- Preceded by: Fumio Tsuji
- Succeeded by: Isao Hayami
- Constituency: Nagasaki 2nd

Personal details
- Born: 6 October 1924 Yilan, Taihoku, Taiwan
- Died: 9 December 2019 (aged 95) Fukuoka, Japan
- Party: Socialist
- Other political affiliations: LSP (1951–1955)
- Education: Taiwan College of Commerce

Masashi Ishibashi (Japanese: 石橋 政嗣 Ishibashi Masashi, 6 October 1924 – 9 December 2019) was a Taiwanese-born Japanese politician who served as chairman of the Japan Socialist Party from 1983 to 1986.

== Early life ==
Born in colonial Taiwan, he graduated from what today is Taipei Municipal Jianguo High School and afterwards enrolled at Taipei Higher Commercial School, which today is National Taiwan University. Ishibashi was conscripted in 1944 and later reached the rank of apprentice officer by the end of World War II.

In 1947, he formed a labor union for the "labor service corps" of the American occupation of Japan and was its general secretary.

== Political career ==
Ishibashi began his political life as a member of the Nagasaki Prefectural Assembly, being elected in 1951. He was elected to the House of Representatives (Japan) for the first time in 1955, running from Nagasaki 2nd district for the Leftist Socialist Party of Japan. In 1966, Ishibashi advocated for the "unarmed neutrality" policy, in which the Japan Self-Defense Forces would be reorganised into a national police force and gradually reduced until an unarmed and diplomatically neutral state can be achieved.

Only a few months preceding the 1983 general elections, Ishibashi assumed the role of chairman for the Japan Socialist Party (JSP). Ishibashi and the JSP cooperated with other opposition parties and moderated their party platform a bit to the right. As a result, the JSP weathered the 1983 elections fairly well and saw its long-running decline in fortunes slow down. In 1984, Ishibashi became the first ever serving chairman of the JSP to visit the United States, calling on Secretary of Defense Caspar Weinberger during Ishibashi's stay in Washington, D.C. Ishibashi also visited North Korea for five days and had talks with Kim Il Sung in late September 1984.

In 1986, under Ishibashi's tenure, the JSP adopted a new program entitled the "New Declaration of the Japan Socialist Party" which saw the party shift in a direction closer to western-style social democratic parties. Unfortunately for Ishibashi, this program did not convince voters that meaningful reform would come from the JSP (as opposed to mavericks within the LDP such as Prime Minister Yasuhiro Nakasone), and as a result the JSP lost 27 seats in the 1986 general elections, and also saw its popular vote fall by 2.26% compared to the previous 1983 election. As is normal in Japanese politics, Ishibashi resigned from his position as chairman following this crushing defeat.

== Later life ==
In later years, he acted as an advisor for JSP chairwoman Takako Doi in strengthening cooperation with centrist parties. Ishibashi's reputation as an inter-party compromiser was seen in the fact that he refused to go along with chairwoman Doi's request that Ishibashi help campaign for an ambitious 180 candidates being fielded by the JSP for the 1990 general election, as this would involve hurting the electoral prospects of centrist allies. The same year as that election, Ishibashi retired from the political world.

After retiring, he turned to memoir writing. In 1994, he was offered the Grand Cordon of the Order of the Rising Sun, but he declined. For the next decade, he turned down similar awards which came every year. Ishibashi died at a Fukuoka hospital on 9 December 2019, aged 95.

Party political offices
Preceded by Ichio Asukata	Chair of the Japan Socialist Party; 1983–1986	Succeeded by Takako Doi
Preceded by Saburō Eda	General Secretary of the Japan Socialist Party; 1970–1977	Succeeded by Shinnen Tagaya
Honorary titles
Preceded by Hiroichi Tsujihara	Youngest member of the House of Representatives of Japan; 1955-1958	Succeeded by Kazuo Tanikawa
