= Doi boom =

Period of electoral success of the Japanese Socialist Party

Doi Boom (土井ブーム), Doi būmu), also known as the Madonna Whirlwind (マドンナ旋風, Madonna senpū), Madonna Boom, or O-Taka-san Boom, refers to a period of electoral success for the Japan Socialist Party (JSP) in Japan around 1990. It was driven by a coattail effect centered on Takako Doi, who was then Chairwoman of the JSP.

== Overview ==
The boom began with the historic emergence of Doi as the first female leader of a major Japanese political party (excluding micro-parties). This led to gatherings of female cultural figures centered around her and significantly boosted her personal popularity.

In the 1989 Tokyo Metropolitan Assembly election and the subsequent 15th House of Councillors election in 1989, the JSP capitalized on anti-Liberal Democratic Party (LDP) sentiment and achieved major victories. In the House of Councillors, the JSP helped push the ruling party below a majority. The party also made substantial gains in the 39th general election for the House of Representatives in 1990. However, it fell short of winning power. Because the JSP was the only opposition party to make significant seat gains, it drew backlash from other opposition parties.

The JSP's continued adherence to traditional policies such as pacifism, which had become less aligned with the changing times, also drew criticism. For example, during debates on international contributions following the Gulf War, the party simply opposed the overseas dispatch of the Japan Self-Defense Forces without offering concrete alternatives, disappointing many voters. Later, under the Murayama Cabinet (in which the JSP held the prime ministership), the party was forced to reverse many of its long-held positions, a shift widely seen as contributing to its eventual collapse.

The boom ended with the JSP's heavy defeat in the 1991 unified local elections, after which Doi resigned as chairwoman to take responsibility. In the 16th House of Councillors election in 1992, the party only managed to hold its existing seats. In the 40th general election for the House of Representatives in 1993, the JSP suffered a major defeat, losing nearly half its seats and essentially giving up all the gains made during the Doi Boom. The party later split and began its path toward becoming a minor party.

== Election examples ==
=== 1989 House of Councillors election ===
In the 15th House of Councillors election in 1989, the JSP benefited from public discontent against the LDP over the "four-point set" of issues: the consumption tax, the Recruit scandal, the sex scandal involving Prime Minister Sōsuke Uno, and orange liberalization. With Doi as Japan's first female party leader, the party employed fresh, women-focused campaign tactics, including fielding a large number of female candidates (referred to as "Madonnas").

The JSP outperformed the LDP in seats up for election (46 to 36) and, including non-up-for-election seats, helped push the LDP below a majority in the House of Councillors. Prime Minister Uno subsequently resigned.

During this period, Doi famously remarked that "the mountain has moved" (山が動いた).

=== 1990 House of Representatives election ===
Buoyed by its success in the upper house election, the JSP raised its candidate target from 150 to 180 for the 39th general election for the House of Representatives in 1990. Together with the Komeito, Democratic Socialist Party, and Social Democratic Federation, the opposition planned to field 300 candidates to secure a stable majority in the 512-seat chamber. However, due to years of passive strategy, the JSP struggled even to field one-third of the total candidates on its own. Competition with other opposition parties and resistance from its own incumbents in multi-member districts further complicated matters. In the end, the JSP endorsed only 149 candidates, while the other three parties fielded 108.

Doi appealed to voters by saying, "We must move one more mountain." The JSP increased its seats by 51 to a total of 136. Nevertheless, the LDP retained a stable majority with 275 seats, and a change of government did not occur.

== Bibliography ==
- Gendai Yōgo no Kiso Chishiki (現代用語の基礎知識, Basic Knowledge of Contemporary Terms), Jiyū Kokuminsha.
