= Hisao Kuroda =

- 黒田 寿男
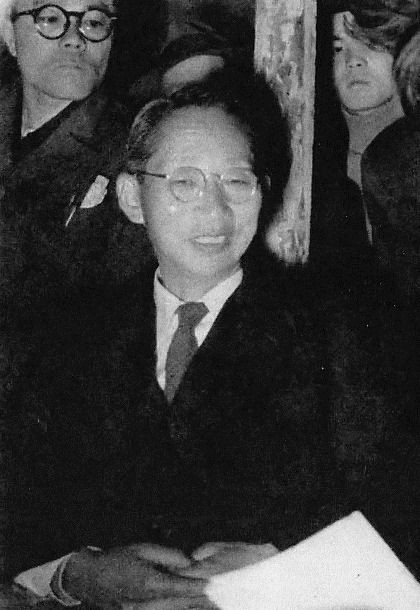

Member of the House of Representatives
- In office 20 February 1936 – 30 April 1942
- Constituency: Okayama 1st district (prewar Okayama 1st district)
- In office 10 April 1946 – 24 January 1955
- In office 23 May 1958 – 13 November 1972

Personal details
- Born: 14 April 1899 Kanagawa Village, Tsudaka District, Okayama Prefecture, Japan (now Kita Ward, Okayama)
- Died: 21 October 1986 (aged 87) Kawasaki, Kanagawa, Japan
- Party: Labour-Farmer Party → Tokyo Proletarian Party → National Masses Party → Japan Socialist Party → Labourers and Farmers Party → Japan Socialist Party
- Education: Tokyo Imperial University Faculty of Law
- Occupation: Politician, lawyer, peasant movement activist

Hisao Kuroda (黒田 寿男, Kuroda Hisao; 14 April 1899 – 21 October 1986) was a Japanese peasant movement activist, politician, and lawyer. He was the first chairman of the Labourers and Farmers Party (founded in 1948) and a former member of the House of Representatives.

== Biography ==
Kuroda was born in Kanagawa Village, Tsudaka District, Okayama Prefecture (now Kita Ward, Okayama). He attended the Sixth Higher School before entering the Faculty of Law at Tokyo Imperial University. While a student he was active in the Shinjinkai (New Man Society) and founded the Student Federation, of which he became chairman. After qualifying as a lawyer he supported labour and peasant movements through the Japan Lawyers Association for Freedom. He joined the Labour-Farmer Party and the Rōnōha (Labour-Farmer faction). In 1929 he founded the Tokyo Proletarian Party and served as its secretary-general; the following year it merged into the National Masses Party.

In the 19th general election of 1936 he stood in the Okayama 1st district with support from the National Farmers' Union and was elected for the first time. The following year (1937) he was arrested together with Kanju Kato in the Popular Front Incident and expelled from politics.

After the war he participated in the founding of the Japan Socialist Party. As a member of the extreme left wing he served as a director of the House of Representatives Budget Committee and as a member of the Agriculture and Forestry Committee. Six extreme-left members including Kuroda opposed the budget bill of the Ashida Cabinet; on 7 July 1948 they were expelled from the party for the rebellion. On 12 July 1948 Kuroda and others (including Hisao Ishino, Haruo Okada and Tenkōkō Sonoda, wife of Sunao Sonoda) formed the Socialist Party Orthodox Faction Diet Members' Group.

Later in 1948 the expelled members founded the Labourers and Farmers Party; Kuroda became its chairman. The party’s founding declaration sharply criticised the Japan Socialist Party from a Marxist standpoint as having “abandoned the class struggle … and degenerated into a bourgeois third party.” It gave limited recognition to the Japanese Communist Party for “fighting for a Japanese democratic revolution” while criticising its “dogmatic bias … and ultra-left struggle-ism,” concluding that “the interests of the working masses cannot be secured by the Japanese Communist Party alone.” The party aimed to occupy a position “to the left of the Socialists and to the right of the Communists.”

In 1954 Kuroda led a delegation that became the first to visit the Democratic People's Republic of Korea after the armistice of the Korean War. He stated that he wished “to report to the Japanese people on the tragic situation of the Korean War and the heroic figure of the Korean people who fought for the independence and freedom of their fatherland,” and contributed to the Japan–Korea friendship movement. Although he sought a united front with the Socialist and Communist parties, the party’s strength stagnated after members such as Sonoda left. Internal splits also occurred in the Japan Farmers' Union, which formed his support base, over leadership rivalry with the Communists. Kuroda himself lost his seat in the 27th general election. The Labourers and Farmers Party dissolved in 1957 and Kuroda and others returned to the Japan Socialist Party.

He returned to the Diet in the 28th general election of 1958. He took part in the opposition movement against the 1960 US–Japan Security Treaty and in the Japan–China friendship movement, and served as chairman of the Japan-China Friendship Association (Orthodox) Headquarters.

After losing his seat in the 33rd general election of 1972 he retired from politics. His successor, Yūsaku Yayama, served three terms in the House of Representatives.

He also served as a standing committee member of the National Farmers' Union and as chairman of the Japan Farmers' Union.

Kuroda died of acute pneumonia on 21 October 1986 at the age of 87.

== Personal life ==
- He was one of the nominal owners of a one-tsubo share of land (hitotsubo kyōyūchi) at the New Tokyo International Airport (now Narita International Airport).
- He is said to have built independent channels of communication with Mao Zedong, Deng Xiaoping, Zhou Enlai and others.

== Works ==
- Warera Seihyō o Tōzu (われら青票を投ず, 1948)
- Nihon Nōmin Kumiai Undōshi (日本農民組合運動史, 1949)

== See also ==
- Labourers and Farmers Party

Party political offices
Preceded by (party founded)	Chairman of the Labourers and Farmers Party; 1948–1957	Succeeded by (party dissolved)
Business positions
Preceded by Jiichirō Matsumoto	Chairman of the Japan-China Friendship Association; 1967–1980	Succeeded by Tokuma Utsunomiya
