= Shinnen Tagaya =

Japanese politician (1920–1995)

- 多賀谷 真稔

Vice Speaker of the House of Representatives
- In office 22 July 1986 – 2 June 1989
- Speaker: Kenzaburo Hara
- Preceded by: Seiichi Katsumata
- Succeeded by: Yoshinori Yasui

Member of the House of Representatives
- In office 18 December 1983 – 24 January 1990
- Preceded by: Tarō Asō
- Succeeded by: Junsuke Iwata
- Constituency: Fukuoka 2nd
- In office 10 December 1972 – 19 May 1980
- Preceded by: Shichirō Matsumoto
- Succeeded by: Kazuaki Ozawa
- Constituency: Fukuoka 2nd
- In office 1 October 1952 – 2 December 1969
- Preceded by: Tashiro Fumihisa
- Succeeded by: Ushirō Itō
- Constituency: Fukuoka 2nd

Personal details
- Born: 20 January 1920 Kure, Hiroshima, Japan
- Died: 9 April 1995 (aged 75) Tokyo, Japan
- Party: Socialist
- Other political affiliations: LSP (1952–1955)
- Education: Waseda University

Shinnen Tagaya (多賀谷 真稔, Tagaya Shinnen; 20 January 1920 – 9 April 1995) was a Japanese politician. He graduated from Waseda University in 1943 and became general secretary of the Central Executive Committee of the Japan Socialist Party in December 1977.
