= Ryokufūkai =

Ryokufūkai may refer to:

- Ryokufūkai (1947–1960), a defunct political party in Japan
- Ryokufūkai (1964–65), a defunct political party in Japan
