= Jōtarō Kawakami =

Japanese politician (1889–1965)

- 河上 丈太郎
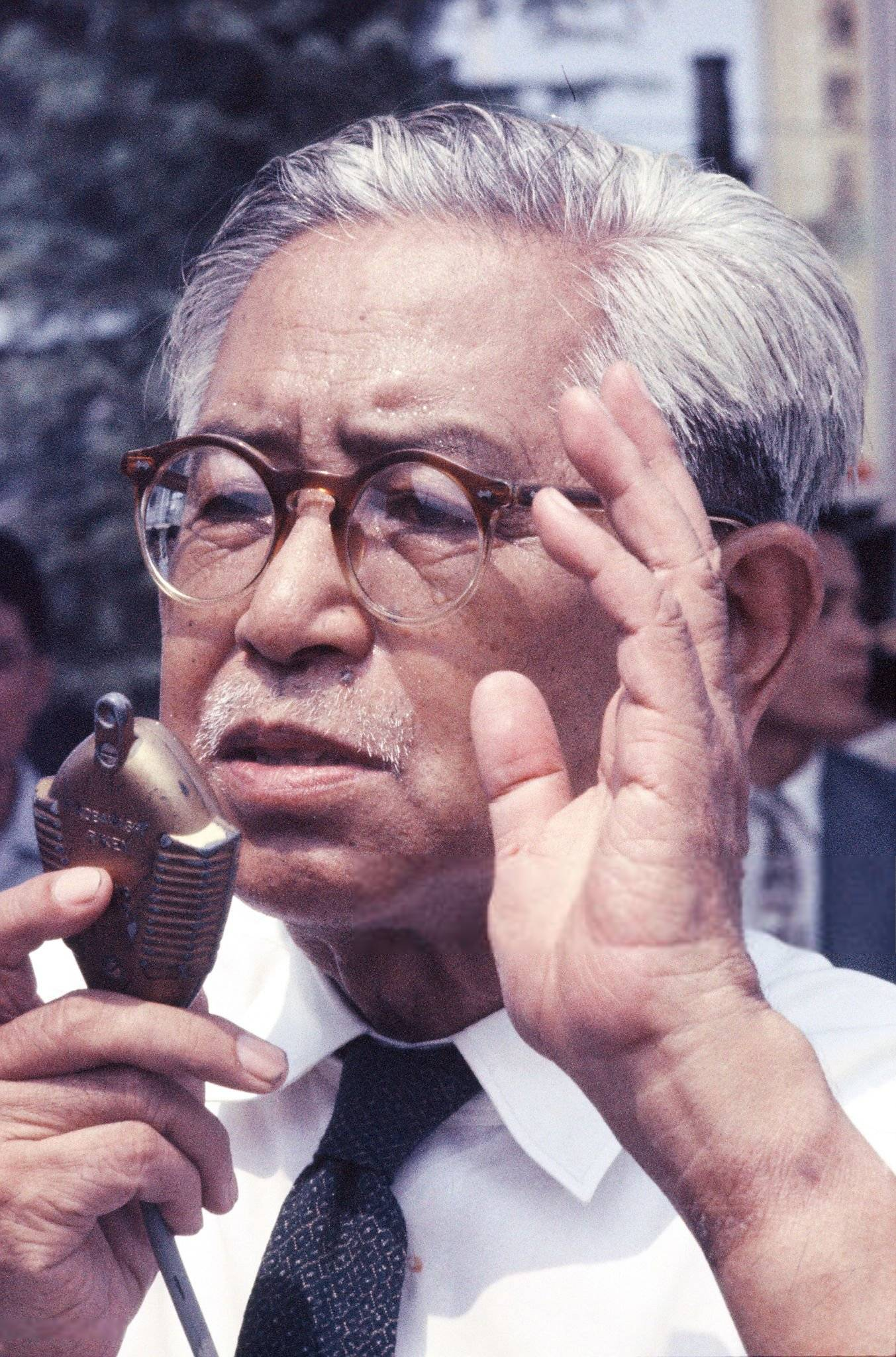
- Kawakami in 1963

Chairman of the Japan Socialist Party
- In office 6 March 1961 – 6 May 1965
- Preceded by: Inejirō Asanuma; Saburō Eda (acting)
- Succeeded by: Kōzō Sasaki

Chairman of the Right Socialist Party of Japan
- In office 25 August 1952 – 12 October 1955
- Preceded by: Position established
- Succeeded by: Position abolished

Member of the House of Representatives
- In office 2 October 1952 – 3 July 1965
- Preceded by: Kenjin Matsuzawa
- Succeeded by: Tamio Kawakami
- Constituency: Hyōgo 1st
- In office 21 February 1936 – 18 December 1945
- Preceded by: Shigemasa Sunada
- Succeeded by: Constituency abolished
- Constituency: Hyōgo 1st
- In office 21 February 1928 – 21 January 1930
- Preceded by: Constituency established
- Succeeded by: Isao Naka
- Constituency: Hyōgo 1st

Personal details
- Born: 3 January 1889 Minato, Tokyo, Japan
- Died: 3 December 1965 (aged 76) Tokyo, Japan
- Party: Socialist (1955–1965)
- Other political affiliations: JFLP (1928); JMP (1928–1930); SMP (1932–1940); IRAA (1940–1945); RSP (1952–1955)
- Spouse: Sueko Hiraiwa (m. 1918)
- Children: Tamio Kawakami
- Education: Rikkyō Middle School
- Alma mater: Tokyo Imperial University

Jōtarō Kawakami (河上 丈太郎; 3 January 1889 – 3 December 1965) was a Japanese politician, academic, lawyer and Christian socialist. Born in Tokyo to a devout Christian family, he studied law at Tokyo Imperial University, taught at Rikkyō University and Kwansei Gakuin University, and was drawn into the labour and socialist movements under the influence of Christian pacifists such as Toyohiko Kagawa.

In the 1928 general election, the first held under universal male suffrage, he was elected to the House of Representatives as one of only eight members from a proletarian party (Japan Labour-Farmer Party). He served almost continuously until his death, interrupted only by the postwar occupation purge for his wartime association with the Imperial Rule Assistance Association.

After the purge was lifted he became the first chairman of the Right Socialist Party of Japan (1952–1955). In his acceptance speech he declared that "the chairmanship is a cross to me" and that he would bear it until death, earning the enduring nickname "Crucifix Chairman" (十字架委員長). He played a leading role in the 1955 reunification of the Japan Socialist Party and later served as its chairman (1961–1965). A centrist within the party, he advocated democratic socialism, structural reform suited to Japan's high-growth economy, and an active peace movement. He survived a right-wing assassination attempt in 1960 and resigned the chairmanship in 1965 for health reasons; he died later that year with a Bible at his bedside.

== Early life and education ==
Hailing from Tokyo's Minato-ku ward, he was the son of a used lumber dealer named Shintaro Kawakami. When Jōtarō was very young, his father became a Christian, which later influenced Jōtarō to become a devout believer, and from the time that Jōtarō was five years old, his father would take him to prayer meetings.

When the church's activity was sluggish, there would be fervent 2-3 hour meetings between the father and son Kawakami along with pastors Kousuke Tomeoka and Shunpei Honma, at which young Jōtarō would often be bored. However, the passionate prayer left a strong impression with him. When the young Jōtarō started schooling, his illiterate father had him read the Old Testament one chapter at a time. In his later years, Jōtarō's father made his wish that his son would become a good politician who would devote himself to the benefit of both God and humans.

At the time that Kawakami was attending Rikkyō Middle School, the daily newspaper known as Yoruzuchōhō (万朝報) carried an article in 1903 by Sakai Toshihiko and Kōtoku Shūsui which criticised the Russo-Japanese War. which developed a strong impression on Jōtarō and led him to develop an interest in socialist thought.

After attending Daiichi High School, Kawakami graduated from Tokyo Imperial University's Law School in 1915 with a specialisation in political science. He had initially prepared to work for the Government-General of Korea, but he loathed the military rule in place over there, and so he became a lecturer at Rikkyō University instead. Later on, through the advice of a colleague, he relocated for a new position at Kwansei Gakuin University. While teaching here, Kawakami encountered the Christian pacifist thinker Toyohiko Kagawa, from which he began to serve as a lecturer at a manual labour school. From this experience, he became thoroughly absorbed in the movement which sought to put socialist ideas into practice.

Furthermore, at the time he was still teaching at Kwansei Gakuin, Kawakami was admitted into Tokyo Imperial University Law School's undergraduate program that specialised in jurisprudence, through which he obtained the needed qualifications for being a lawyer.

=== Marriage ===
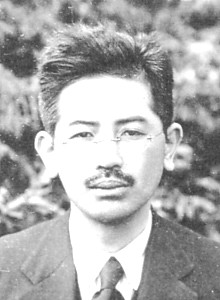
Kawakami as a young man

At the time that Kawakami was still a professor at Kwansai Gakuin, he decided to marry Sueko Hiraiwa, who had never met and only knew through the occasional exchange of letters. Sueko's father Yoshiyasu, who was the second director of the Japanese Methodist Church, was angry that her daughter chose a marriage partner without his permission, and opposed the marriage because he viewed Kawakami to be an eccentric. Sueko spent two nights trying to convince her father to reconsider his position.

Being that Kawakami had also not consulted his family before choosing to marry, his father also expressed strong opposition, in part because he was prejudiced against educated women. However, approval was eventually acquired through the positive readings of a fortune teller.

Although it had temporarily been decided that the wedding would take place at a large auditorium in Aoyama Gakuin, because Kawakami had insisted that a lifetime should begin from a smaller place, the wedding location was changed to the Harris Hall, an area that was around 5 tsubo (~16.5 sq. meters). Since this location was so cramped, attendees were unable to sit properly. There was no wedding ring nor taking of commemorative photographs. After the ceremony, evening family worship was held at the Kawakami household.

== Political career ==
In the 1928 general election, the first one for which there was universal male suffrage, Kawakami was elected as a member of the Japan Labour-Farmer Party, making him one of only eight Diet members who belonged to a proletarian party. After that, although he failed to secure re-election in the 1932 general election, Kawakami made a come-back in the 1936 general election, and from there he would remain in the House of Representatives until his death. At this time, he also jumped between different party affiliations, such as the Japan Masses Party, the National Masses Party, and the National Working and Farming Masses Party.

In 1932, after various Japanese proletarian parties decided to consolidate into the Socialist Masses Party, Kawakami also joined it and agreed with the party when it began to endorse state socialist policies. Kawakami voted along with most in the Socialist Masses Party in expelling Saito Takao for his famous antimilitarist speech in 1940. In that same year, Hisashi Asō, a figure who worked to further entrench national socialist policies within the Socialist Masses Party, died, and Kawakami became his proxy as a director at the Imperial Rule Assistance Association. Due to these reasons, Kawakami was purged in the immediate postwar period as a wartime collaborator by the occupation authorities.

=== Leader of the Right Socialist Party ===
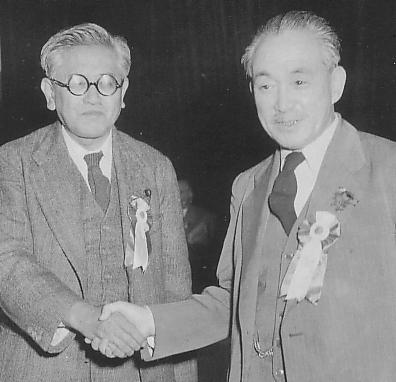
Kawakami (left) with Mosaburō Suzuki, circa 1950.

When the occupation-era purge was lifted, Kawakami was recommended for the chairmanship of the Right Socialist Party. On 25 August 1952, at the party's 10th extraordinary convention, he delivered his acceptance speech, later known as the "Cross Speech" (十字架演説). In it he declared:

"Gentlemen, I believe that the democratic revolution is a path of sacrifice. The ideal of democratic socialism, which must be upheld resolutely while facing the threats of totalitarianism from both the left and the right, is a road of hardship, as the history of various countries shows. We must even be prepared to risk our lives. Nevertheless, our predecessors taught us: "Charge forward over the dead." My conscience does not permit me to avoid this path of hardship. The chairmanship is a cross to me. Nevertheless, I have resolved to bear the cross and fight until death. I therefore gladly accept your recommendation."

The phrase "The chairmanship is a cross to me" became widely associated with Kawakami’s character and earned him the nickname "Crucifix Chairman" (十字架委員長).

Shortly afterwards, he commenced regular Thursday-morning prayer meetings for Christian Diet members inside the National Diet Building.

In the 1952 general election held that same year, Kawakami gave a speech to supporters in which he said:

"My long time of being purged is over, it is now at last possible for me to have an audience with you, my friends. I was purged because I had been participating in a certain organisation. To be honest about my feelings, although it is not the case that I had always been participating with that organisation of my own free will, I won't make many excuses now. Among you all, ladies and gentlemen, if there are people who are begrudgingly critical of my actions during the war, please make an impartial judgement during the election. Again, I desire that any people who forgive me to cooperate not for my own individual benefit but for the greater benefit of the Japan Socialist Party."

He also apologised for his wartime activities. A great many formerly purged politicians stood for this election, but it has been said that Kawakami was the only one who formally acknowledged his wartime responsibility.

In 1955, with regards to the reunification of the Japan Socialist Party (after it had split into leftist and rightist factions), Mosaburō Suzuki of the Left Socialist Party inherited the position of chairman, whereas Kawakami became a party advisor. After that, Kawakami vigorously pursued the peace movement, and when the wartime Minister of Commerce and Industry, Nobosuke Kishi, became prime minister, Kawakami acknowledged his own war responsibilities once again and pressed Kishi to acknowledge his own as well.

On 17 June 1960, Kawakami was stabbed in his left shoulder by a right-wing youth, in an apparent assassination attempt.

=== Leader of the Socialist Party ===
In 1960, when Suehiro Nishio formed the Democratic Socialist Party, some Diet members who belonged to the Kawakami faction of the JSP defected to the DSP. In so doing, it is said that Chairman Kaoru Ōta of the General Council of Trade Unions of Japan requested Kawakami not to move the entirety of his own faction over to the DSP in exchange for election cooperation. However, in order to restrain the feelings of the Kawakami faction, Kawakami himself ran for the JSP leadership election, and lost to the Suzuki faction-endorsed candidate Inejirō Asanuma by a narrow margin. The Kawakami faction was pleased with this unexpected show of support and thus its agitation in favour of the DSP subsided, and as a result Kawakami succeeded in keeping even the slightest factionalism in the JSP at bay. However, following Inejirō Asanuma's assassination later in October 1960, after a brief period in which Saburō Eda was acting chairman, Kawakami was elected to be the JSP's chairman.

Kawakami was a centrist which placed him on the right end of the spectrum within the JSP. Under his chairmanship, the party pursued a policy of "Structural Reform," advocated by Eda, which sought to present a more optimistic vision of Japan's future more suitable for the era of high-speed economic growth than the party's previous image of always harping on social inequities. The aim was to broaden the base of the party to new constituencies.

In his later years, Kawakami fell ill during an election campaign and his condition deteriorated afterwards, and he felt that if he were to continue being chairman in that condition, he would be criticized by later generations for being too attached to his position, and had his eldest son Tamio send in a note of resignation to the JSP. Tamio would later serve in the House of Representatives and was the diplomatic bureau director of the Japan Socialist Party. Kawakami was replaced as party chairman by the far-left faction leader Kōzō Sasaki, who had vigorously opposed the "Structural Reform" policies. He brought an end to the "Structural Reform" program and returned the party to a more orthodox Marxist party line.

In 1965, Kawakami collapsed from overwork, and on the 3rd of December that same year, while hospitalised, he died with a Bible at his bedside. Ten days prior to the collapse, while on an NHK program, Kawakami argued that the Japanese people are at the forefront of the peace movement, which is the will of God, because they were the first nation to experience an atomic bomb, and that he would devote his entire life to pursuing a peaceful society. The cause of death was subarachnoid haemorrhage.

== Anecdotes ==
At the time, when newspaper reporters discussed politicians, it was common to refer to them without honorifics or by nicknames. However, even among newspaper reporters, Kawakami was known as a person of character, and everyone called him "Kawakami-san" using the honorific san. This anecdote has been recorded. In addition, true to his background as a scholar, it is said that between campaign speeches he would read foreign newspapers and magazines and never neglected the study of policy.

When Kawakami died, his friend since the days of the former First Higher School, Okinori Kaya, described him in a memorial piece using words such as ideals, conviction, faith, justice, passion, pure-heartedness, and goodwill.

== Works cited ==
- Kapur, Nick (2018). Japan at the Crossroads: Conflict and Compromise after Anpo. Cambridge, MA: Harvard University Press. ISBN 978-0674984424.
- 河上前委員長記念出版委員会編『河上丈太郎 十字架委員長の人と生涯』日本社会党、1966年。
- 高橋勉『社会党河上派の軌跡』三一書房、1996年。ISBN 4380963004
- 田村祐造『戦後社会党の担い手たち』日本評論社、1984年。
- 「高見澤潤子笛吹けどおどらず―河上丈太郎」『永遠のあしおと―真実な神に出会った人たち』主婦の友社、1976年、217－236頁。
- 資料日本社会党四十年史. 日本社会党中央本部. 1986.
