= Kōzō Sasaki =

Japanese socialist activist and politician

- 佐々木 更三
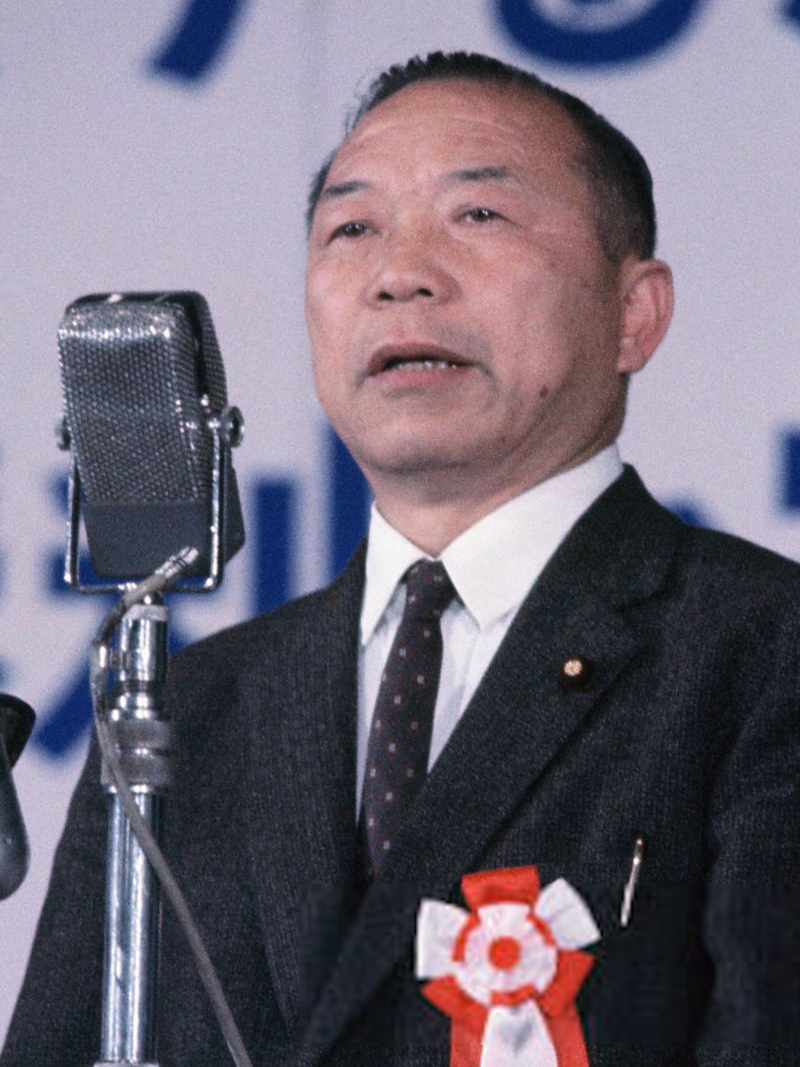
- Sasaki in 1965

Chairman of the Japan Socialist Party
- In office 6 May 1965 – 19 August 1967
- Preceded by: Jōtarō Kawakami
- Succeeded by: Seiichi Katsumata

Member of the House of Representatives
- In office 26 April 1947 – 9 December 1976
- Preceded by: Constituency established
- Succeeded by: Kazuo Takeda
- Constituency: Miyagi 1st

Personal details
- Born: 25 May 1900 Motoyoshi, Miyagi, Japan
- Died: 24 December 1985 (aged 85)
- Party: Socialist
- Education: Nihon University

Kōzō Sasaki (佐々木 更三, Sasaki Kōzō; 25 May 1900 – 24 December 1985) was a Japanese socialist agitator and politician. The longtime leader of the left wing of the Japan Socialist Party in the postwar period, he served as chairman of party from 1965 to 1967.

Small in stature and possessed of a fiery temper and a thick rural Tōhoku accent, he was a loud-mouthed and charismatic figure nicknamed "Kōzō the Ogre."

== Early life ==
Kōzō Sasaki was born the third son of an impoverished farming family in Miyagi prefecture on 25 May 1900. Sasaki was born while his parents were on the run for having eloped without permission, so he was not entered into a proper family registry until he was 11 years old and therefore could not enroll in regular school until that time. Instead of going to school, he performed hard manual labor, such as manufacturing charcoal. As a teenager, he went to Sendai city to work in a silk mill, saving up money to go to Tokyo for study. He graduated from Nihon University's 2-year junior college with a degree in politics in 1928. It was at Nihon University that Sasaki first became exposed to socialist ideas and became involved in the Japanese labor movement. Returning to Sendai, he got a job in a bicycle factory, but was fired almost immediately for attempting to organize a strike. Thereafter, he became an activist in the Labor-Farmer Movement and became a leader in instigating contentious tenant-landlord disputes, leading to physical brawls with police and multiple arrests.

In 1937, Sasaki was elected a Sendai city council member, but lost his post just one year later when he was arrested as part of the Popular Front Incident. Thereafter, he supported himself by running a used bookstore and selling fuel oil.

Sasaki Kozo in 1948

== National Politics ==
After Japan's defeat in World War II, socialism was legalized, and Sasaki became involved in the founding of the Japan Socialist Party (JSP) in 1945. He ran unsuccessfully for the Lower House of the National Diet in 1946, but was elected the following year, and thereafter served 11 consecutive terms until he was defeated in 1976. In the Diet, Sasaki was noted for his pro-China and anti-American outlook. Sasaki soon became known as the "sidekick" of JSP heavyweight and future party chairman Mosaburō Suzuki, facilitating his rapid rise within the party. When the party splintered in 1948, Sasaki followed Suzuki into the Left Socialist Party, but he supported the reunification of the party in 1955. Securing Sasaki's support for reunification was seen as crucial to solidifying the new party, and thus his stature within the party was further enhanced. With Suzuki becoming chairman of the newly reunified JSP, Sasaki became the new factional leader of the left wing of the party, a position he would hold for more than two decades.

Beginning in 1960, Sasaki engaged in a fierce rivalry with the moderate socialist leader Saburō Eda for control of the party as well as its policy platform. Sasaki strenuously opposed Eda's program of "structural reform," which sought to broaden the party's base by pursuing policies that might appeal to white-collar workers and farmers who were outside the JSP's traditional base of the urban working class. As a doctrinaire Marxist-Leninist, Sasaki insisted that a true socialist revolution could only be built on a firm base of the urban proletariat. He accused Eda of "status-quo-ism" and "sucking up to monopoly capital." Sasaki succeeded in having Eda ousted from his post as party Secretary General in 1962, further increasing his stature with the party's base.

Finally in 1965, Sasaki succeeded in winning the election as Chairman of the Japan Socialist Party. However, Sasaki had the misfortune of serving as party head at a time when the Clean Government Party and the Japan Communist Party were surging at the polls and eating away at the JSP's urban working-class base. Many in the party viewed the General Election of 1967 as a disastrous defeat. Although the party only lost 4 seats in the Lower House, expectations had been high, and Sasaki's hard-left radicalism was blamed for the poor showing. He was ousted as party chairman in favor of the more moderate Tomomi Narita, although Narita actually fared far worse in future elections.

Well-known as a vocal supporter of People's Republic of China, Sasaki was called upon by the conservative government of Eisaku Satō to assist in negotiations to restore diplomatic relations between Japan and China in 1972, a request which he was pleased to oblige.

== Later life and death ==
In the 1976 election, Sasaki lost his own seat in the Diet. Thereafter he retired from politics and became involved in the Japan-Cambodia Friendship Association. In 1978, he attracted criticism by visiting Cambodia and claiming that there had been no massacres whatsoever under the Khmer Rouge and that claims of massacres were merely slanderous American propaganda. He also joined a group advocating for the return of the Kuril Islands to Japan by the Soviet Union.

Sasaki died of heart failure on 24 December 1985.

Party political offices
Preceded by Jōtarō Kawakami	Chair of the Japan Socialist Party; 1965–1967	Succeeded by Seiichi Katsumata
