= Saburō Eda =

Japanese politician (1907-1977)

- 江田 三郎
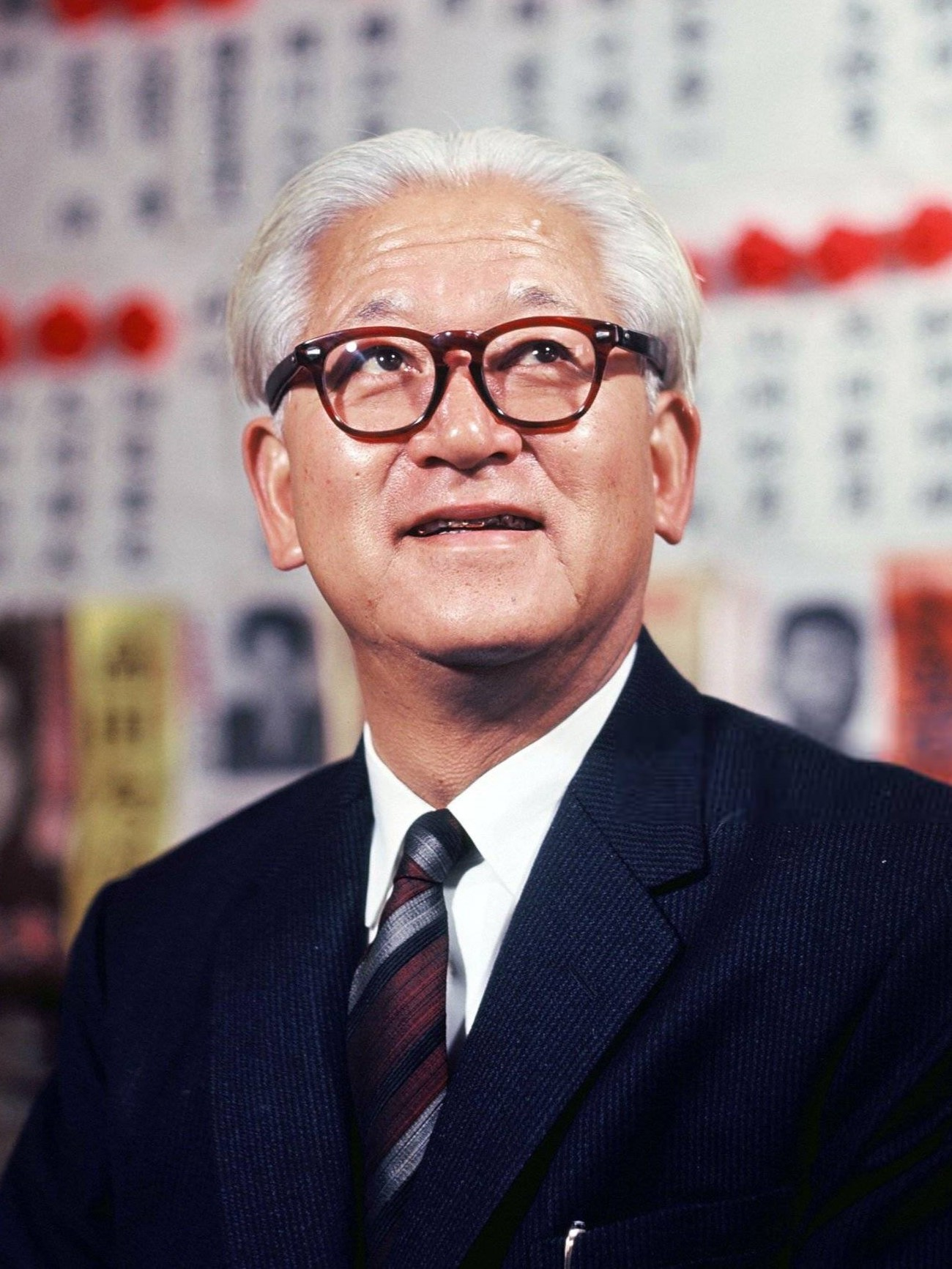
- Eda in 1963

President of the Socialist Citizens Federation
- In office 26 March 1977 – 22 May 1977
- Preceded by: Position established
- Succeeded by: Shigeo Ōshiba

Member of the House of Representatives
- In office 22 November 1963 – 9 December 1976
- Preceded by: Setsuo Fujiwara
- Succeeded by: Minoru Mizuta
- Constituency: Okayama 2nd

Member of the House of Councillors
- In office 5 June 1950 – 7 July 1962
- Preceded by: Binkei Ōta
- Succeeded by: Yūsaku Yayama
- Constituency: Okayama at-large

Member of the Okayama Prefectural Assembly
- In office 1947–1948
- Constituency: Kamitsumichi District
- In office 1937–1938
- Constituency: Kamitsumichi District

Personal details
- Born: 29 July 1907 Kume, Okayama, Japan
- Died: 22 May 1977 (aged 69) Tokyo, Japan
- Party: Socialist (1946–1977)
- Other political affiliations: NMP (1931–1931); NWFMP (1931–1932); SMP (1932–1938); LSP (1948–1955); SDF (1977)
- Children: Satsuki Eda
- Education: Kobe University; Hitotsubashi University

Saburō Eda (江田 三郎, Eda Saburō; July 29, 1907 – May 22, 1977) was a Japanese party politician, prominent in the postwar period, who served two terms in the Member of the House of Councillors and four terms in the Member of the House of Representatives, and rose to become the Secretary General and Acting Chairman of the Japan Socialist Party in the early 1960s. Eda's optimistic "Eda Vision" of a broad-based, moderate form of socialism briefly won acclaim from the Japanese mass media before being beaten back by hardliners in the left wing of the party. He was the father of Japanese politician Satsuki Eda.

== Prewar and wartime activities ==
Eda was born in Fukuwatari Village, Kume District, Okayama Prefecture. His father, Matsujirō Eda, ran an udon and soba noodle manufacturing and wholesaling business and was also a minor political leader in the local branch of the Minseitō Party. In 1931, while a student at Tokyo University of Commerce (present-day Hitotsubashi University), Eda suffered from a bout of pleurisy and returned home for treatment. Back in Okayama, Eda became heavily involved in the local farmer's movement. Dropping out of university, he joined the National Masses Party, a conglomeration of farmer's and proletarian working class political parties. In 1937, he was elected and served one term in the Upper House of the Okayama Prefectural Assembly. However, in 1938, he was arrested along with approximately 400 other prominent leftists as part of the "Popular Front Incident" and imprisoned for two years. Released in 1940, he was given to understand that his presence was not welcomed in the metropole, so he left Japan proper to find work in Japanese-occupied China.

== Postwar politics ==
Returning to Japan after the end of World War II, Eda joined the newly formed Japan Socialist Party (JSP) in 1946. Affiliated with the left wing of the party, Eda sided with the Left Socialists when the Party split in two in 1948. In 1950, Eda was elected to the House of Councillors, where he would serve two terms. In 1955, the two halves of the JSP reunited, and in 1957, Eda became a member of the party's Central Executive Committee, as well as head of its Agricultural Bureau.

In 1958, Eda was named chairman of the JSP's Party Organizing Committee. Thereafter, Eda won the loyalty of a large number of the party's grassroots activists by initiating a number of reforms to modernize the party's organizational structure and improve the general treatment of lower-level party activists. Drawing upon the buzzword "structural reform" promoted by the Italian Communist Party under Palmiro Togliatti, Eda promoted his reformist ideas for the JSP under the label "structural reform" (構造改革, kōzō kaikaku).

In September 1959, when Right Socialist leader Suehiro Nishio expressed the heretical view that the JSP was "a broad-based party of the people" rather than a party based exclusively in the urban working class, Eda hinted at his own centrist leanings when he responded that, "The JSP is a class-based party in as much as it seeks to reform capitalist society and construct a socialist society, but it is a broad-based people's party in the sense that it is fighting for the benefit of the majority of the people and not to encourage the egoism of the working class." Nevertheless, Eda also harshly criticized Nishio's views as "abandoning socialism and replacing it with a welfare policy within the framework of capitalism," and supported moves toward expelling Nishio from the party.

After Nishio saw the writing on the wall and bolted the JSP in January 1960 to form the new Democratic Socialist Party, Eda rose to become the second most powerful man in the JSP, serving as Secretary General under new party Chairman Inejirō Asanuma. When Asanuma was spectacularly assassinated during a televised election debate on October 12, 1960, just weeks before a national election, Eda was hastily named "Acting Chairman" of the JSP and became the party's leader and candidate to become prime minister of Japan should the party triumph in the election.

== Leader of the Japan Socialist Party ==
=== "Structural Reform" platform and electoral victory ===
Rather than adopting a more circumspect approach in the wake of his sudden, unexpected elevation to JSP party leadership, Eda seized the initiative to have his own vision of socialism enshrined as JSP party policy. At the 19th Party Congress, which began one day after Asanuma's assassination, Eda took advantage of the somber mood, looming election, and strong desire for party unity to force through his platform of "structural reform" as the JSP's "new party line" with little opposition or debate. The "structural reform" platform drew inspiration from the recently concluded Anpo protests against the U.S.-Japan Security Treaty, which had achieved massive size and forced the resignation of conservative prime minister Nobusuke Kishi. Eda and his allies viewed these protests as having been an unalloyed success in having allowed the JSP to play a leading role in fomenting a mass movement. Eda's "structural reform" platform called for a combination of parliamentary pressure tactics and Anpo-style extra-parliamentary mass movements that would gradually move Japan toward socialism by forcing the government into a series of piecemeal concessions. Above all, Eda and his fellow structural reformers hoped to broaden the base of the JSP beyond a hard core of labor unionists, leftist student activists, and Marxist intellectuals to encompass people from many walks of life, in order to dramatically increase the party's potential supporters at the polls.

Leading the JSP into the general election in Asanuma's place, Eda appeared in the second televised election debate as the new party leader, and impressed audiences with his sunny demeanor and even-handed tone. The JSP's showing in the election was viewed as a success, as the party increased its number of seats in the National Diet, further cementing Eda's grip on power within the party.

=== "Eda Vision" of socialism ===
In order to achieve his goal of broadening the base of the Japan Socialist Party, Eda sought to rebrand socialism using more straightforward language that would cut through complex Marxist jargon and offer a simple, optimistic vision to the Japanese people. To this end, he propounded his "New Vision of Socialism," better known in the Japanese media as the "Eda Vision" of socialism. The Eda vision was first proclaimed at a July 27, 1962 speech Eda gave National Conference of Socialist Party Regional Organizers in Nikko. In this speech, Eda famously proclaimed,

Socialism must be defined in sunny and cheerful terms that are easily understandable to the masses. I believe that “socialism” is that which allows human potential to blossom to its fullest extent. The main four accomplishments that humankind has achieved so far are America's high standard of living, the Soviet Union's thoroughgoing social welfare system, England's parliamentary democracy, and Japan's peace constitution. I believe that if we can integrate these, we can give birth to a broad-based socialism.

The "Eda Vision" of a more moderate form of socialism received a wildly enthusiastic reception in the mainstream Japanese press, which was wary of more hard-left socialist policy prescriptions, and the "Vision" also polled very well in broad-based public opinion polls. Thus, for a few months in mid 1962, Eda seemed to be riding high. However, the "Eda Vision" was the final straw for the more dogmatically Marxist leftwing factions in the JSP, who had already chafed against the moderate tone of Eda's "structural reform" platform. In particular, they could not accept praise of what they viewed as the "imperialist" United States and Great Britain, and the "deviationist" and "Stalinist" Soviet Union. At the 22nd Party Congress in November 1962, the left wing of the JSP revolted, and succeeded in persuading a majority of party members present to adopt an "Eda Vision Criticism Resolution" that renounced the "Eda Vision" as antithetical to core party principles. Eda was forced to resign his position as secretary general, and thereafter the party gradually returned to a more dogmatically Marxist platform which focused entirely on the urban working classes as the party's main political base.

== Later life and death ==
In later years Eda ran numerous times for Chairman of the Japan Socialist Party, but was unsuccessful, although he did serve a second stint as Secretary General from 1968 to 1970. Nevertheless, Eda remained popular among the broader Japanese public and in the 1970s conservative prime minister Kakuei Tanaka said at a press conference, "If the Japan Socialist Party were ever to make Eda its Chairman again, a general election would be terrifying. They would drastically expand their seats in the Diet." However, Eda could never overcome the undying animosity his "Eda Vision" had won him from his party's hardcore left wing.

In 1976, Eda lost his re-election bid and was booted from the Diet. Blaming his loss on his party's dogmatic, doctrinaire Marxism and desperate for reform, he attempted to resign from the JSP but the party refused to accept his resignation and voted to expel him instead. Thereafter, Eda formed a new political party, the Socialist Citizens Federation (later renamed the Socialist Democratic Federation) and ran for re-election to the Diet. However, Eda died suddenly of lung cancer on May 22, 1977. His son, Satsuki Eda, hastily ran in his place, and won the election.

Party political offices
Preceded by Inejirō Asanuma	Chairman of the Japan Socialist Party (Acting); 1960–1961	Succeeded by Jōtarō Kawakami
Preceded by Inejirō Asanuma; Kōichi Yamamoto	Secretary General of the Japan Socialist Party; 1960–1962; 1968–1970	Succeeded by Tomomi Narita; Masashi Ishibashi
