= Class party =

Political party descriptor

Class party (German: Klassenpartei, Japanese: 階級政党; kaikyū seitō) refers to a political party that represents the position and interests of a specific social class, relying on that class as its base. The term is most commonly self-applied by parties of the working class, primarily socialist and communist parties. The antonym is people's party (Volkspartei, 国民政党; kokumin seitō).

== History ==
Historically, the concept was heavily influenced by Marxism, which emphasized class struggle. Socialist and communist movements positioned themselves as the parties of the working class or proletariat (propertyless class). In this framework, parties of the opposing capitalist class were derisively labeled bourgeois parties (with the political system itself called bourgeois democracy). In practice, parties considered "bourgeois" (mainly conservative or centrist parties) rarely describe themselves as class parties, instead usually claiming to be people's parties.

Following the October Revolution, Leninism (Marxism–Leninism) gained prominence within Marxism. Peasants came to occupy a significant position, leading to parties representing both the working class and the peasant class (e.g., Labour-Farmer Party, Chinese Communist Party). Leon Trotsky criticized such formations as "two-class party theory." In other cases, separate peasant parties were created (such as the Democratic Farmers' Party of Germany in East Germany and the United People's Party in Poland). Class parties often strengthen themselves by building broad support networks within their social class, which frequently leads them to function as mass parties (organized parties, as opposed to cadre parties). However, it is also possible for them to be small organizations led by a handful of revolutionaries with limited mass base.

== Current reality ==
In the 20th century, however, societies diversified with the growth of the middle class, the spread of white-collar work, and the emergence of mass society. As analysis shifted from rigid social classes to more fluid social stratification, the relevance of class parties declined in Western developed countries. Socialist parties increasingly merged with social reformism and rebranded as social democratic or democratic socialist people's parties focused on welfare and social security for the entire nation. For example, the Social Democratic Party of Germany transitioned to a people's party with the Godesberg Program in 1959. This trend continued and became decisive with the end of the Cold War.

Other party types also emerged that were difficult to categorize under the class-party framework, such as religious parties based on religion or faith, parties reflecting differences between conservative conservatism and centrist/liberal liberalism, green parties based on environmentalism and new social movements, parties representing ethnic minorities, and regional parties.

== Situation in Japan ==
In Japan, the Japanese Communist Party continues to explicitly position itself as a class party. Article 2 of its party rules states that it is "the party of the working class" while simultaneously being "the party of the Japanese people" (日本国民の党). Some observers note that this dual claim makes it ambiguous which identity the party prioritizes most.

Historically, the Japan Socialist Party was deeply divided between those who saw it as a communist/Marxist–Leninist class party and those who favored a social democratic/people's party model. This led to a split into left-wing and right-wing Socialist Parties. In the left wing, the new concept of a "class-based mass party" (階級的大衆政党) emerged.

After reunification in 1955 under left-wing dominance, and following further internal conflicts such as the formation of the Democratic Socialist Party and the structural reform debate, the 1964 programmatic document The Road to Socialism in Japan established the Japan Socialist Party's identity as the party of the working class and a class-based mass party aiming ultimately at socialist revolution.

The left-wing tendency persisted even after the adoption of the New Declaration of the Japan Socialist Party in 1986, influencing the current Social Democratic Party and the New Socialist Party. The right wing, after the Socialist–Liberal Democratic coalition in 1994, saw renewed conflict, with many members leaving to help form the old Democratic Party.

== See also ==
- Bourgeois party
- Class struggle
- Left Socialist Party Platform – The Road to Socialism in Japan – Japanese-style social democracy
- Morito–Inamura dispute – Debate within the Japan Socialist Party over the class-party concept.
- "Proletarian parties" – Prewar Japanese socialist parties organized as parties of the proletariat.
- Trade union – Social movement organizations that class parties rely upon.
