= Japan Socialist Association =

Marxist theoretical organization within the Japan Socialist Party

The Japan Socialist Association in 1951. Hitoshi Yamakawa, Kikue Yamakawa, and others.

The Japan Socialist Association (社会主義協会, Shakai Shugi Kyōkai) was a theoretical research group of the Japan Socialist Party established on 13 April 1951, with roots in the prewar Rōnōha. Unlike the Japanese Communist Party, which advocated the transformation of Japan into a socialist state through violent revolution, the Japan Socialist Party aimed for the peaceful realization of a socialist state (peaceful socialist revolution) and the establishment of the dictatorship of the proletariat. The Socialist Association was a major reason why the Japan Socialist Party remained a socialist party and did not become a Western European social-democratic party, like the main left-wing opposition parties in other Western countries (see The Road to Socialism in Japan).

The Association took Marxism–Leninism as its guiding theory. It sought to disseminate this theory and defined itself as “a thought group that aims to realize socialism peacefully through the class-based strengthening of the Japan Socialist Party.” At its 8th Congress in June 1967, a split occurred between the Ōta faction (right wing) and the Sakisaka faction (left wing). Within former Socialist Party circles, the simple term “the Association” usually refers to this Socialist Association.

== History ==
=== Prehistory and early period after founding ===
The predecessor of the Association was the Rōnōha (労農派), which before the Second World War engaged in debates with the Kōzaha (lineage of the present-day Japanese Communist Party) over the application of Marxism to Japan and the nature of Japanese capitalism (the debate on Japanese capitalism). It took its name from the magazine Rōnō (労農; Labor-Farmer), founded in 1927. The group was dispersed by repression on the eve of the Pacific War (the Popular Front Incident), but after Japan’s defeat, it regrouped around Yamakawa Hitoshi and, in 1947, launched the theoretical journal Zenshin (前進; Advance). Zenshin ceased publication in November 1950 because of the publisher’s financial difficulties and internal conflicts among the contributors. A year earlier, on 13 July 1949, the contributors of Zenshin had formed the Socialist Study Group (社会主義研究会).

On 13 April 1951, the Socialist Association was founded as a development of this Socialist Study Group. It was also decided to publish a new organ in place of Zenshin, and the journal Shakai Shugi (社会主義; Socialism) was launched. The name was chosen by Ōuchi Hyōei. At the outset the Association included people such as Ōuchi Hyōei, Yamakawa, Sakisaka Itsurō, and Takahashi Masao, as well as many politicians of the Japan Socialist Party (including Suzuki Mosaburō and Eda Saburō) and trade-union leaders of the Sōhyō (General Council of Trade Unions of Japan) lineage. Because the launch of Shakai Shugi relied on the assistance of Sōhyō’s Takano Minoru, Takano’s influence was strong in the early editorial policy of the journal. Ōuchi and Yamakawa served as representatives of the contributors. At the time of its founding, Shakai Shugi had a circulation of about 3,500 copies.

Before long, conflicts between Yamakawa and Takano over the draft of the Left Socialist Party Program, the handling of the Shimizu counter-draft and the day-to-day running of the Association became increasingly frequent. In December 1953, Takano, Shimizu Shinzō and others left the Association. Thereafter, the Association linked Yamakawa’s group with the anti-Takano faction inside Sōhyō led by Ōta Kaoru, and developed as the theoretical mainstay of the Left Socialist Party. Some people have called this left-wing dominance within the Socialist Party “Japanese-style social democracy.” In the 1950s, the Association still contained people of various ideological tendencies. It was also skeptical toward the existing socialist countries of the Soviet Union and Eastern Europe; it expressed sympathy for the people who rose in the East German uprising of 1953, the Poznań uprising, Hungarian Revolution of 1956, and sharply criticized Soviet occupation policies.

=== From the reunification of the Socialist Party to the Anpo and Miike struggles ===
Because the Association opposed the reunification of the Socialist Party in 1955, its relations with the Suzuki faction—the central faction of the Left Socialist Party—cooled, and it drew closer to the Wada faction, which was at odds with the Suzuki faction. Its influence within the party rapidly declined. Yamakawa, while opposing reunification, showed flexibility after reunification by calling on activists to cooperate with the leadership; he died in 1958. Sakisaka, who succeeded him as Association representative, called for the Socialist Party to return to the spirit of the Left Socialist Party Program and allied himself with Sōhyō strongmen Ōta and Iwai Akira, who were close to the Wada faction.

In 1960, the Miike struggle broke out, centered on activists trained by Sakisaka. Sakisaka himself went to the site to encourage the activists, and the Association supported the struggle, which ended in defeat. The ideas of the Association that had led the Miike struggle spread within the Japan Socialist Youth League (Shaseidō), which had been born out of the Anpo and Miike struggles on the basis of the Socialist Party’s youth section. At its 3rd General Meeting in 1961, the Association itself declared its intention to grow into an organization capable of responding to practical tasks; a nationwide organizer system was introduced, and efforts were concentrated on recruiting activists from the party, the trade unions, and Shaseidō. Around this time, people such as Takahashi, whose views differed from Sakisaka’s, gradually left the Association.

=== Orientation toward a practical organization and the adoption of Marxism–Leninism ===
From around 1960, when the theory of structural reform—aiming at the gradual realization of socialism through reforms—gained ground inside the Socialist Party, Sasaki Kōzō, who was in conflict with Eda (the standard-bearer of structural reform), sought to strengthen his position by supporting the Association. While Socialist Party leaders ignored activists and concentrated on factional struggles, the Association, with Sakisaka himself opening his home to lecture on Das Kapital, devoted itself to the education of activists and won their hearts. The Association deepened its relationship with the Labor University (which had been the Left Socialist Party School and became an independent body after the reunification of the two socialist parties) and used it as an educational institution for activists; it further strengthened its organization by launching the activist-oriented magazine Manabu (まなぶ; Learn). At the 4th Congress of Shaseidō in 1964 a “basic line of blocking constitutional revision and opposing rationalization” based on Association theory was adopted, Association-linked activists took control of the Shaseidō executive, and this laid the foundation for subsequent expansion of influence.

The Association gradually became a practical organization; its general meetings were renamed congresses and it began to adopt movement policies. At the 7th Congress in 1966 it was decided that Marxism–Leninism (which followed the Soviet Union and was therefore critical of Stalin) would be the Association’s basic theory. This Marxism–Leninization is said to have resulted from the influence of both Sakisaka, who visited the Soviet Union twice (in 1961 and 1965), and the group around Mizuhara Teruo that later became the core of the Ōta faction and aimed to turn the Association into a practical organization. The Association’s basic theory, centered on the theory of peaceful revolution, was set out in detail in the “Socialist Association Theses” (社会主義協会テーゼ), which were decided once immediately before the 1967 split and formally adopted in 1968; these theses explicitly affirmed the dictatorship of the proletariat. Association members also played a major role in the 1964 decision on the Socialist Party’s programmatic document “The Road to Socialism in Japan” and in the 1966 revision that affirmed the dictatorship of the proletariat.

=== Split of the Socialist Association – the Sakisaka and Ōta factions ===
The 8th Regular National Congress was held on 26–27 June 1967. Over the issue of revising the Association’s rules, the Socialist Association split into the Sakisaka faction and the Ōta faction. Whereas the Sakisaka faction emphasized theoretical study, the Ōta faction was not satisfied with that and devoted more energy to workplace and local activity; the split was therefore rooted in differences of movement form. Because the majority of congress delegates belonged to the Ōta faction, Sakisaka, together with Ōuchi, “rebuilt” a new Association and launched a separate Shakai Shugi. At the time of the split the Sakisaka faction was the minority, but it participated more actively in the Socialist Party’s organizational work and produced several members of the National Diet. By contrast the Ōta faction suffered a large-scale split and secession at the end of 1970, leading to the formation of the Japan Working-Class Liberation Struggle League (later “People’s Power”) and the Communist Study Group (later the “Young Communist League (provisional)” and then the Internationalism Editorial Conference), and its strength declined. The Ōta faction also had Diet members, but after the mass secession of its left wing the Sakisaka faction gained an advantage among rank-and-file activists. Thereafter the term “Socialist Association” came to refer to the Sakisaka Association.

Shaseidō, which was strongly influenced by the Association, fell into a state of division in the late 1960s among the Sakisaka faction, the Ōta faction, and the Anti-War faction (including New Left entryist groups). At the 10th Congress of Shaseidō in 1971 Sakisaka-linked activists monopolized the executive and expelled the Anti-War faction. Ōta-linked members did not participate in the 10th Congress and soon formed a separate organization, the Shaseidō National Council, but the Socialist Party recognized only the Sakisaka-led Shaseidō as its sole cooperative youth organization. Thereafter Shaseidō became an organization under strong Sakisaka Association influence and expanded rapidly.

=== As a faction inside the Socialist Party ===
The Sakisaka Socialist Association expanded its strength inside the Socialist Party on the basis of support from party and Shaseidō activists and effectively became a faction of the party. In 1968, when the Soviet army intervened in Czechoslovakia during the democratization movement known as the Prague Spring, Sakisaka sided with the Soviet Union. The Association advocated joint struggle among all opposition parties including the Japanese Communist Party and came into fierce conflict with Eda Saburō, who oriented toward Western European-style social democracy and the exclusion of the Communist Party, as well as with the pro-China faction. On the other hand it debated with the Communist Party over issues such as the attitude of local-government workers toward residents and the working-class character of teachers. Contemporary journalism called the Association the farthest left wing of the Socialist Party. Sakisaka himself, however, who was also a scholar of Marxist economics, criticized the far left as not being socialist.

The background to the Association’s growth in influence inside the Socialist Party from the 1960s to the 1970s was that the Socialist Party itself lacked an independent theory of party organization; Association-linked activists occupied the main parts of the local organizations, and electoral work and the like depended on Association members and Shaseidō members. In addition, non-Association activists declined, so that Association members came to account for as much as 40 percent of the delegates at party congresses.

In trade-union theory the Association adopted a line of struggle against rationalization. This held that rationalization under capitalism works to the disadvantage of workers and that therefore all capitalist rationalization must be opposed. Such ideas found it difficult to spread influence in private firms with strict labor management. Inside the Japanese National Railways, however, the Association played a major role in blocking the productivity-improvement movement, and when the courts recognized the illegal acts of managers engaged in that movement, the Sakisaka Association expanded its strength in the public-sector unions centered on the National Railway Workers’ Union (Kokurō). In the All Japan Telecommunications Workers’ Union (Zendentsū) of the Nippon Telegraph and Telephone Public Corporation (now the NTT Group), rapidly growing Association activists strongly criticized the union executive for its passive attitude toward the anti-rationalization struggle and were subjected to disciplinary measures. This incident became one of the pretexts for the 1977 regulation of the Association.

The Sasaki faction, which had maintained a certain cooperative relationship with the Association, had a strongly pro-China character. As the Sino-Soviet split progressed and the Association’s strength came to surpass its own, the Sasaki faction moved still closer to China in order to counter the Soviet Union and the Association, and formed the Committee of Seven together with its former enemies around Eda. At the February 1977 party congress Association delegates criticized the pro-China figures such as Vice-Chairman Eda and former Chairman Sasaki, as well as the Socialist–Kōmeitō–Democratic Socialist line, and came within a step of a majority; this aroused the vigilance of the other factions and raised the cry “Regulate the Socialist Association.” Local organizations such as the Chiba Prefectural Headquarters split into Association and anti-Association groups, and Eda, who left the party after the congress, died shortly afterward. Sōhyō, which was seeking a turn toward a labor–management cooperation line, also supported regulation of the Association. Reluctantly, at the 11th Congress (General Meeting) in 1978 the Association accepted that it would confine itself to theoretical research and refrain from political activity, partially amended the “Socialist Association Theses” into the “Proposals of the Socialist Association” (社会主義協会の提言), and changed the name of its congresses back to general meetings. Although the wording was altered under the regulation, the actual activities remained almost unchanged. At that time the Sakisaka Association claimed more than ten thousand members and the circulation of Shakai Shugi was said to have reached 62,000 copies.

=== From regulation of the Association to stagnation of activity ===
The decline of the Association began not from external regulation but from internal changes. In November 1982 Fukuda Yutaka, then editor of Shakai Shugi, and others published Contemporary Capitalism and the Image of Socialism (現代資本主義と社会主義像), and scholars who had studied under Sakisaka gradually shifted toward social democracy. Many of the central party headquarters secretariat group also split from the Association in June 1987 and formed the “Association to Create a New Socialist Party” (創る会). The Association’s strength gradually waned. After Sakisaka’s death in January 1985, Kawaguchi Takehiko became representative. The Association strongly resisted the adoption of the “New Declaration of the Japan Socialist Party” in 1986, but parts of the Association itself approved or tacitly accepted the New Declaration and no unified position was reached. Thereafter the section of the Association closely linked to the Socialist Party gradually became a moderate left group supporting the party leadership and showed a certain understanding of social democracy, while other members insisted that the stance of the 1970s should be maintained. In the trade-union movement internal conflicts deepened over the unification of the labor front. The Revolutions of 1989 and the collapse of the Soviet Union in 1989–1991 strengthened the social-democratic line. The Socialist Party’s participation in government and the confusion of its basic line, the dissolution of Sōhyō, and the formation of Rengō also affected the Association, and organizational dispersion advanced in the 1990s.

Meanwhile the Ōta Association supported the formation of the Japan Railway Industry Labor Union Confederation (later the Japan Railway Labor Union Confederation) by the right wing of Kokurō (the so-called Min-dō left) during the process of dismantling Kokurō at the time of the division and privatization of the Japanese National Railways. Ōta opposed this, left the Ōta Association on 1 May 1987, and formed the Socialist Labor Movement Study Group in December of the same year. With the left-wing ballast removed by Ōta’s departure, the Ōta Association first changed the name of its organ Shakai Shugi to Progress and Reform (進歩と改革) from the April 1988 issue and soon changed the organization name itself to the Progress and Reform Study Group. Thereafter it became an organization that actively advocated social democracy and continued to speak within the Socialist Party and the Social Democratic Party. Because the Ōta Association abandoned the name Socialist Association, the Sakisaka faction became the sole Socialist Association at that point.

=== After the dissolution of the Socialist Party – second split (1998) ===
In January 1996 the Socialist Party changed its name to the Social Democratic Party. Some left-wingers opposed to this founded the New Socialist Party, while about half of the right-wing Diet members joined the Democratic Party of Japan when it was formed in September of the same year, and the Socialist Party dissolved. On this occasion the Association was unable to adopt a unified policy, and its members dispersed among the Social Democratic Party, the New Socialist Party, and the Democratic Party. Thereafter the Association’s organizational crisis intensified; the Reconstruction Committee established to overcome the crisis became paralyzed by internal conflict. Many New Socialist Party–linked Association members did not attend the 31st General Meeting convened in February 1998 by Satō Tamotsu in his capacity as representative, and in March of the same year they “rebuilt” a separate Socialist Association with Sakaushi Tetsuro and Ueno Ken’ichi as representatives. Satō’s Socialist Association elected Kawaguchi, Satō, and Kojima Tsunehisa as representatives at the 31st General Meeting. Kawaguchi died in 1998; Satō retired as representative in 2012 and Kojima in 2014. In the Sakaushi Association the founding representatives Sakaushi and Ueno both retired in 2016, and Imamura Minoru, who succeeded them, also retired in 2019.

Unlike the earlier Sakisaka–Ōta split, the 1998 split involved almost no fierce exchanges of criticism, and cooperation and mutual exchange have taken place in some fields and regions. The Sakaushi Association adopted the “New Theses of the Socialist Association” in 2001 and the Satō Association adopted the “Reinforcement of the Proposals of the Socialist Association” in 2002, both making a certain overall assessment of the dissolution of the Socialist Party and Sōhyō and the collapse of the Soviet and East European socialist systems. Both the Satō and Sakaushi Associations no longer use the term Marxism–Leninism and instead employ “scientific socialism.” Scientific socialism is, however, a synonym for Marxism, and the “Proposals of the Socialist Association” are still regarded as valid; the advocacy of the dictatorship of the proletariat has not been abandoned. Whatever the practical reality, it cannot be said that they have ideologically converted from Marxism to social democracy (one may also say that only Leninism has been abandoned).

=== Present situation ===
Subsequently, within the Sakaushi Association criticism arose that the decision to have Hara Kazumi, then vice-chairman of the New Socialist Party, stand as a proportional-representation candidate for the Social Democratic Party in the 2010 House of Councillors election and the acceptance of Hara’s dual party membership (New Socialist Party and Social Democratic Party) in violation of the rules constituted a conversion to social democracy. A group led by Hosokawa Tadashi, a former Central Executive Committee member of the New Socialist Party, decided in May 2012 to found the Scientific Socialism Study Group and rebuild the Association, and in December 2014 “rebuilt” its own Socialist Association. The Hosokawa Association explicitly states Marxism–Leninism in its rules. In addition, Hara Norito, a former Central Executive Committee member of the New Socialist Party, and others also left the Sakaushi Association and, based around Shakai Tsūshin (社会通信; Socialist Correspondence), criticized the New Socialist Party Central and the Sakaushi Association over policies such as basic income.

As a result of these developments, the Sakisaka Association is divided into three organizations as of 2023, all of which call themselves the “Socialist Association.” The nicknames below are derived from the names of the representatives at the time of each split.

- Represented by Tatematsu Kiyoshi and Itō Osamu (Sugita Norimichi, elected co-representative with Tatematsu in 2014, died in January 2017; Itō newly appointed in 2026); publishes Shakai Shugi; the traditional Constitutional Democratic Party / Social Democratic Party lineage (including some New Socialist Party members and independents) – commonly called the “Satō Association.”
- Represented by Ishikawa Yasunori, Kawamura Yōji, and Ishikawa Ichirō; publishes Kagakuteki Shakai Shugi (科学的社会主義; Scientific Socialism); the New Socialist Party mainstream – commonly called the “Sakaushi Association (or Reconstruction Association),” Socialist Association (Ishikawa, Kawamura, Ishikawa).
- Represented by Hosokawa; publishes the bimonthly organ Kenkyū Shiryō (研究資料; Research Materials); the New Socialist Party non-mainstream – commonly called the “Hosokawa Association.” The Hosokawa Association’s official blog has not been updated for nearly six years, and it is unclear whether it is still active.

At the time of the de facto split of the Social Democratic Party over the 2020 merger into the Constitutional Democratic Party, the Satō Association’s response was divided between those in favor and those against the merger, and a split was rumored as in 1996 when the Socialist Party disappeared; however, aversion to further organizational division is strong inside the Satō Association and no split has occurred. Shakai Shugi carries articles reflecting the positions of both the Constitutional Democratic Party and the Social Democratic Party. Association members who joined the Constitutional Democratic Party form the core of the Social Democratic Forum, founded on 28 February 2021 by Social Democratic Party members who had joined the Constitutional Democratic Party.

The Sakaushi Association’s website updates stagnated from around October 2024, but around October 2025 the site was renewed and the organization began to call itself the Socialist Association (Rōnō-ha). It soon changed the name again to Socialist Association (Ishikawa, Kawamura, Ishikawa).

The Socialist Association itself defines its task in the 21st century as follows: “We will actively advance research, investigation, and discussion in accordance with the Association’s purpose (Article 2 of the Rules) and tasks (Article 6 of the Rules), place firm confidence in the law that the contradictions created by the development of capitalism will necessarily produce the advance of the workers’ movement, and, firmly linking ourselves to this, devote all our strength to the re-establishment of a socialist party that will take broad united-front work as its pillar, with the class-based strengthening of the labor movement at its center.” (“Ten Years of Reconstruction and Research Activity”).

== Relations with the Soviet Union, confrontation with China, and subsequent developments ==
Relations between the Socialist Association and China were not particularly conspicuous before 1975. The “Socialist Association Theses” adopted in 1968 treated the Cultural Revolution in relatively cool language.

=== Criticism of China arising from the Sino-Soviet split ===
The relationship changed with the “Joint Statement of the Sixth Japan Socialist Party Delegation to China and the China–Japan Friendship Association Delegation” of May 1975. Reflecting the state of Sino-Soviet relations at the time, the Chinese side strongly demanded the inclusion of language treating the Soviet Union and the United States as equal “hegemonism of the two superpowers,” and Chairman Narita Tomomi accepted this.

The Socialist Association strongly opposed this and openly criticized China by name in its organ Shakai Shugi and elsewhere. The Chinese side did not reply in official media such as the People’s Daily, but criticized the Socialist Association by name in conversations and greetings with visiting delegations. The joint statement intensified internal party conflict and became one cause of the collapse of the Narita–Ishibashi system. Even after the end of the Cultural Revolution in 1977, Liao Chengzhi of China is said to have described the Taiwan lobby and the Socialist Association as “forces hostile to China” and, in irritation, referred to them as “these people.” The Socialist Association for its part also condemned the Chinese government and China-aligned armed guerrillas such as Pol Pot.

=== After the easing of the Sino-Soviet split ===
When the “Three Worlds Theory” that regarded the Soviet Union as hegemonist was withdrawn at the 12th Congress of the Chinese Communist Party in September 1982, the confrontation between China and the Socialist Association also quieted. When the Japan Socialist Party established official party relations with the Chinese Communist Party in 1983, General Secretary Hu Yaobang is said to have apologized to Chairman Ishibashi Masashi for the Chinese attitude at the time of the 1975 Japan–China joint statement. In the 1985 Japan–China Youth Exchange of Three Thousand, Shaseidō, which was strongly influenced by the Socialist Association, also sent a delegation.

Thereafter there was no particular organizational exchange between the Socialist Association and China, but after the Satō Association received a visiting delegation from the Institute of Marxism–Leninism and Mao Zedong Thought of the Chinese Academy of Social Sciences in 2001, regular theoretical exchanges with its successor, the Academy of Marxism of the Chinese Academy of Social Sciences, have taken place. The Satō Association’s “Reinforcement of the Proposals of the Socialist Association” points out problems regarding China but still regards it as a socialist country. On the other hand, articles questioning China’s system sometimes appear in the Sakaushi Association–linked Shakai Tsūshin and the Hosokawa Association’s Kenkyū Shiryō.

== Criticism of the Anti-War Youth Committee ==
The Socialist Association, which concentrated its efforts on the labor movement, kept its distance from the street struggles of the New Left and criticized the violent Anti-War Youth Committee. At the time it was also wary of the entryist tactics of the Liberation Faction and the Fourth International, but there is no longer any confrontation on this point.
