= Japan Socialist Association Theses =

1968 Marxist-Leninist program of the Japan Socialist Association

The Japan Socialist Association Theses (社会主義協会テーゼ, Shakai Shugi Kyōkai Tēze) is a document that set out the basic principles of the Japan Socialist Association. Following the association's regulation in the previous year, it was partially revised in 1978 and renamed the "Proposals of the Socialist Association" (社会主義協会の提言).

== Formulation process ==
After the two Socialist Parties merged in 1955 and the Left Socialist Party Program was discarded, the Socialist Association no longer possessed a document that formalized its own theory. For this reason, the drafting of such a document was proposed at the Socialist Association's 4th General Meeting (1962). On the first day of the 8th Congress (August 1967), at which the Socialist Association split into the Ōta faction and the Sakisaka faction, it was adopted under the title "Prospect of Victory" (勝利の展望). (The split itself occurred on the third day of the congress.) Because "Prospect of Victory" contained compromises with the Ōta faction on points such as peaceful revolution, after the split the (Sakisaka faction's) final draft was published in a special issue of Socialism in 1968, and it was re-adopted at the 2nd Congress (September 1968) as the "Socialist Association Theses (Part I) – The Road to Socialist Revolution" (社会主義協会テーゼ（第一部）－社会主義革命への道). After the congress it was issued in pamphlet form; when stocks sold out at the end of 1970, a single-volume edition containing "For the Study of the 'Socialist Association Theses'", the "Left Socialist Party Program" and other materials was published in May 1971, which became the definitive text. In general, the term "Socialist Association Theses" refers to this Part I.

In the Ōta-faction Socialist Association, the "Prospect of Victory" was adopted immediately before the split was scarcely studied, and no alternative document was produced.

== Contents ==
The document consists of a preface, an introductory chapter "The Path of the Socialist Association", Chapter 1 "The Conditions and Form of the Socialist Revolution in Japan", and Chapter 2 "The Character and Tasks of the Socialist Association". Its principal contents are as follows:

1. Understanding of the international situation
As a result of the establishment of the socialist world system, the political maturity of the working class in the capitalist countries, and the development of national independence movements, the imperialist world system has greatly retreated, and the present age is the era of socialist revolution. In particular, the development of the socialist world system is becoming the positive driving force of world-historical development. Socialism inevitably produces contradictions both domestically and internationally, but unlike capitalism these contradictions can always be resolved.

2. Understanding of the situation in Japan
Japanese capitalism has completed the reconstruction of the system of finance monopoly capital and has been revived as imperialism. Japan's sovereignty is restricted by American imperialism, but this is because Japanese monopoly capital and the state themselves have transferred part of that sovereignty to the United States; it is not the case that state sovereignty is held by the United States. Japanese monopoly capital and the state basically dominate Japan. The basic contradiction of Japanese capitalism is the class antagonism between the capitalist class and the working class, and the character of the revolution is an anti-monopoly socialist revolution.

3. The necessity of peaceful revolution
In Japan, democracy is institutionalized by the Constitution, and state power is concentrated in the National Diet. When a revolutionary socialist party succeeds in rallying the masses with the working class as the leading force, the socialist revolution necessarily proceeds peacefully through the Diet without an armed uprising. International conditions such as the expansion of the world peace movement also constitute general conditions for a peaceful transition.

4. Dictatorship of the proletariat
A revolutionary socialist government will, in principle, place the means of production under state or public ownership. It will take control of, or abolish, the various organs of administration, the judiciary, education, the military, and so on. It will guide the press, broadcasting and other institutions in accordance with the new social order. It will possess a democratic police force, but whether a democratic army is necessary will be determined by the concrete circumstances of the time, and it is premature to decide the question today. A regime capable of carrying out these tasks is the dictatorship of the proletariat. Whether it is a single-party or multi-party system is not a general condition of the socialist revolution.

5. Conditions for revolution – distinction between general crisis and special crisis
Capitalism is in general crisis, but this does not mean that the conditions for the outbreak of revolution exist at all times; it depends on whether a special crisis exists and, further, whether the subjective conditions are present.

6. The subject of the revolution
The subject of the revolution is the organized workers, and the socialist party that is based on them and leads them. To isolate monopoly capital, other strata are rallied into a united front of anti-monopoly, defence of democracy and opposition to imperialist war. The task of a united front government or transitional regime is the thorough expansion of democracy. There may be cases in which, because of the immaturity of the subjective conditions or for other reasons, a temporary retreat becomes necessary.

7. Anti-rationalization struggle as the basic struggle
The working class is thoroughly antagonistic toward monopoly capital. Japanese monopoly capital is compelled to pursue powerful systemic rationalization to overcome its contradictions. Consequently it encounters the powerful resistance of the working class – the anti-rationalization struggle. The central and basic movement for the formation of an anti-monopoly united front is the anti-rationalization struggle; without the strength reinforced by the anti-rationalization struggle at the point of production, the formation and growth of an anti-monopoly united front is impossible.

8. Basic tasks of the Socialist Association
The Japan Socialist Party as a whole possesses a correct grasp of the present situation and a correct revolutionary line, and it is possible to strengthen the Japan Socialist Party as the core party that will carry out the socialist revolution. The basic task of the Socialist Association is the class strengthening of the Japan Socialist Party. The political activities of Association members are, in principle, all carried out within the Japan Socialist Party and in accordance with its decisions. While making every effort to ensure that decisions at every level of the party are as correct as possible, and while striving to correct any errors in policy, members devote their full energy to the concrete implementation of those decisions.

== Theses Part II ==
At the 2nd Congress it was also decided that theses for each field of activity would be drafted as Part II and submitted for discussion at lower levels. Of these, the theory of the labour movement was adopted at the 4th Congress (1971) as "Trade Union Movement and the United Front" (労働組合運動と統一戦線), and the theory of the peasant movement was adopted at the 5th Congress (1972) as "Peasant Movement and the United Front" (農民運動と統一戦線). Other sections, such as the youth movement and party activity, were also scheduled for adoption but were never realized. The labour-movement and peasant-movement sections were issued by the Socialist Association in pamphlet form in 1973 under the title "Trade Union Movement, Peasant Movement and the United Front" and were called "Theses Part II".

== After the association regulation ==
The "Socialist Association Theses" concretely set out the content of the Marxism–Leninism then advocated by the Socialist Association and strongly reflected the thought of its then representative Itsurō Sakisaka. They exerted an extremely large influence on the subsequent movement of the Association, and a tendency to absolutize the "Theses" also arose within the Association. At the time of the association regulation in 1977, the very name "Socialist Association Theses" was criticized as aiming at a party within the party. At the 11th Congress (General Meeting) of the Socialist Association in February 1978, the name was therefore changed to "Proposals of the Socialist Association", expressions such as "for a socialist party, this is equivalent to a programme" were deleted or revised, and "For the Study of the 'Socialist Association Theses'" and "Trade Union Movement and the United Front" were abolished. A single-volume edition of the revised Proposals of the Socialist Association was published the same year, but members dissatisfied with the compromise continued for a long time to use the name "Socialist Association Theses".

After the dissolution of the Soviet Union, the need to revise the "Proposals of the Socialist Association", which stipulated the superiority of socialism and other points, was raised at the Association's 25th General Meeting in March 1992, but the work did not progress. After the re-split of the Socialist Association in 1998, the revisions were realized as the "New Theses of the Socialist Association" (Sakaushi Association, 2001) and the "Reinforcement of the Proposals of the Socialist Association" (Satō Association, 2002). In the Satō Association it had been planned to treat the "Proposals" as a historical document and to adopt a "New Proposals of the Socialist Association" (provisional title), but many members remained attached to the "Proposals"; ultimately the corrected and reinforced portions were designated the "Reinforcement of the Proposals", and the two together were decided to constitute the "Proposals of the Socialist Association". In the Sakaushi Association's "New Theses" the relationship to the "Proposals" ("Theses") is not explicitly stated.

== See also ==
- Japan Socialist Association
- Itsurō Sakisaka
