= Rōnōha Marxism =

Japanese Marxist network in pre-war Japan

Rōnōha (労農派, Rōnōha; lit. "Labor-Farmer Faction") was a current of non-Japanese Communist Party (JCP) Marxism in pre-war Japan. It took its name from the theoretical magazine Rōnō (『労農, Labor-Farmer), founded in December 1927. The group brought together economists who opposed the Kōzaha in the debate on Japanese capitalism, social activists active in the legal left-wing proletarian parties, and writers associated with the "Bungei Sensen faction" of proletarian literature.

The Rōnōha is regarded as one of the two principal schools of Japanese Marxist analysis of capitalism that emerged in the late 1920s, the other being the Kōzaha (associated with the JCP and the Comintern). Its positions exerted lasting influence on the left wing of the postwar Japan Socialist Party and on Japanese Marxist economics more broadly.

== Formation ==
The first Japanese Communist Party is generally dated to July 1922. Veteran Meiji-period activists including Sakai Toshihiko, Yamakawa Hitoshi, and Arahata Kanson joined and became leading figures. In early 1924 many members dissolved the party, arguing that conditions for a communist party did not yet exist in Japan. Arahata opposed dissolution and helped maintain a small residual committee (the Bureau).

Yamakawa and his associates advocated organizing a broad legal proletarian party encompassing all anti-bourgeois forces rather than a narrow underground vanguard. They promoted this "change of direction" strategy in legal publications. The Bureau launched the theoretical journal Marxism in May 1924. Fukumoto Kazuo contributed a series of articles advancing his theory of "separation before unity" (Fukumoto-ism), which sharply criticized Yamakawa and gained influence among intellectuals and students. Although the Comintern later repudiated Fukumoto-ism, its impact lingered inside the reconstituted party.

Under Comintern guidance the Bureau decided in January 1925 to rebuild the party; the Second Japanese Communist Party was formally established in December 1926. The Comintern’s 1927 Theses on Japan criticized both Fukumoto and Yamakawa, clarifying the split. Arahata left the Bureau, declined to join the new party, and aligned with Yamakawa. In December 1927 Yamakawa and others founded the magazine Rōnō as an independent theoretical base; the Rōnōha took its name from this journal.

Yamakawa later recalled that the editorial collaborators of Rōnō came to be called the "Rōnōha." They had not intended to form a formal faction and found the label unpleasant, yet the name stuck.

The JCP decided in February 1928 to expel Yamakawa and Arahata. The Rōnōha side maintained that the two had never joined the Second Communist Party and had already broken with it, rendering the expulsion irrelevant.

== Theoretical positions ==
The Rōnōha functioned more as a loose network of theorists and activists sharing a common analysis than as a disciplined organization. Its core positions, as later summarized in discussions associated with the postwar Japan Socialist Association, included the following:

1. Character of Japanese capitalism

The Meiji Restoration was an incomplete but decisive bourgeois revolution. The Emperor system constituted a bourgeois monarchy. By the late 1920s the principal target of political struggle was the imperialist bourgeoisie centered on finance and monopoly capital. Consequently the coming revolution was socialist in character (a one-stage revolution), not a two-stage process requiring a prior bourgeois-democratic stage.

1. Evaluation of Bolshevism and the Comintern

Leninism (Bolshevism) was a specific development of Marxism under Russian conditions, not a universal model. Japanese socialists should start from Japanese reality rather than imitate either German social democracy or Russian communism. The revolutionary movement should not be directed from a single world center.

1. Theory of the party

For the broad masses the choice between capitalism and socialism was not yet an immediate practical issue. Marxists should therefore work to build a single legal mass proletarian party of united-front character uniting all anti-bourgeois forces, while expanding their own influence within it.

1. Theory of trade unions

Trade unions were not substitutes for the party. The trade-union movement needed unity. Everyday economic struggles and the longer-term struggle for socialism should not be mechanically separated.

These views brought the Rōnōha into sustained theoretical conflict with the Kōzaha (which defended the Comintern's analysis of residual feudalism and the necessity of a two-stage revolution) in the Japanese capitalism debate of the early 1930s.

== Later developments ==
Many participants were arrested in the Second Popular Front Incident of February 1938 (following earlier arrests in late 1937).

After 1945 the current was largely inherited by the Japan Socialist Association, the principal theoretical grouping of the left wing of the Japan Socialist Party. Through that channel Rōnōha analysis continued to shape policy discussions inside the Socialist Party and the labor federation Sōhyō, contributing to what has been described as a distinctive Japanese-style social democracy.

== Leading figures ==
Limited to those active before the Second World War.

Economists

- Kushida Tamizō (櫛田民蔵)
- Ōuchi Hyōei (大内兵衛)
- Inomata Tsunao (猪俣津南雄)
- Tsuchiya Takao (土屋喬雄)
- Sakisaka Itsurō (向坂逸郎)
- Arisawa Hiromi (有沢広巳)
- Okazaki Jirō (岡崎次郎)
- Ōmori Yoshitarō (大森義太郎)

Social activists and politicians

- Sakai Toshihiko (堺利彦)
- Yamakawa Hitoshi (山川均)
- Yamakawa Kikue (山川菊栄)
- Eda Saburō (江田三郎)
- Suzuki Mosaburō (鈴木茂三郎)
- Arahata Kanson (荒畑寒村)
- Kuroda Hisao (黒田寿男)
- Tsushima Tadayuki (対馬忠行)

Literary figures

- Hayama Yoshiki (葉山嘉樹)
- Aono Suekichi (青野季吉)
- Hirabayashi Taiko (平林たい子)
- Komaki Ōmi (小牧近江)
