= Morito–Inamura dispute =

1949 conflict in the Japan Socialist Party

The Morito–Inamura dispute (森戸・稲村論争, Morito-Inamura ronsō) was an intra-party conflict and policy debate within the Japan Socialist Party (JSP) at its 4th National Congress in 1949 over the proposed platform and movement guidelines. It is named after the clash between Tatsuo Morito of the party's right wing and Junzō Inamura of the party's left wing, each of whom submitted their own draft proposals.

The Morito draft characterized the party as a "national party" (kokumin seitō) that would pursue anti-communism while strictly adhering to the rules of parliamentarism. In contrast, the Inamura draft defined the party as a "class party" (kaikyū seitō) that would achieve social transformation through revolution and would not rule out joint struggle (kyōtō) with the Japanese Communist Party when necessary. The debate was also linked to differing evaluations of the party's earlier experience in government through the Katayama Cabinet and Ashida Cabinet, and became a focal point on how socialist policies should be realized in Japan.

The dispute was ultimately mediated by Seiichi Katsumata, resulting in a compromise description of the party's character as "a democratic organizational body of the broad working masses, centered on the working class and including farmers, small and medium-sized business owners, intellectuals, and others." The overall movement guidelines adopted a distinctly left-leaning tone. The position of party Secretary-General also shifted from the right-winger Inejirō Asanuma to the left-winger Mosaburō Suzuki. This outcome laid the groundwork for the left-right split of the party two years later. From the 4th Congress onward, the Japan Socialist Party maintained basic left-wing dominance until the adoption of the "New Declaration of the Japan Socialist Party" in 1986. Some scholars describe this tendency of the JSP as Japanese-style social democracy.

The Morito–Inamura dispute became the prototype for the recurring policy-line debates that shaped the subsequent history of the Japan Socialist Party. Katsumata's mediation is well-known for introducing the concept of a "class-based mass party" (kaikyūteki taishū seitō), although the exact phrase itself did not appear in the adopted movement guidelines. The term was only formally incorporated into official party documents later with the adoption of the Left Socialist Party platform.
