= Class-based mass party =

Japan Socialist Party designation, 1949–1986

Class-based mass party (Japanese: 階級的大衆政党, kaikyūteki taishū seitō) was the self-designation used by the Japan Socialist Party from 1949 to 1986. It was also the line of the left wing of the party, which viewed the middle class as a backward social class and positioned the working class as the primary agent of social transformation. The following article mainly covers the Japanese case.

== Overview ==
In the 1949 general election held after the corruption scandal of the Ashida Cabinet, the Japan Socialist Party suffered a major loss of seats, prompting a rebuilding of party strength. Junzō Inamura proposed the class party theory while Morito Tatsuo advocated the national party theory. This led to the so-called Morito–Inamura dispute. Due to a large influx of labor activists into the party, the class-based mass party theory — coordinated by Seiichi Katsumata — was adopted. Even at the time of the 1955 reunification of the Japan Socialist Party, the concept and term "class-based mass party" were explicitly written into the party platform of the reunified Japan Socialist Party (Chapter 3).

Thereafter, amid repeated debates with the Nishio faction and left-right confrontations following the party's long-term decline, fierce disputes continued between the left wing of the party — which insisted on maintaining the class-based mass party character — and the right wing, which called for transforming the party into a national party. With the decline of left-wing influence and the end of cooperation between the Japan Socialist Party and the Japanese Communist Party, right-wing forces gained ground. The New Declaration of the Japan Socialist Party adopted in 1986 redefined the party's character as "the party of the people", effectively abandoning the concept of the class-based mass party.

== See also ==
- Mass party
