= New Japan Construction National Movement =

The New Japan Construction National Movement (新日本建設国民運動, Shin Nihon Kensetsu Kokumin Undō) was a cultural, spiritual, and lifestyle-improvement movement promoted by the Katayama Cabinet (centered on the Japan Socialist Party) in the early postwar period. Its basic policy was set out in the Cabinet decision of 20 June 1947 entitled “Outline of the New Japan Construction National Movement” (新日本建設国民運動要領), which Education Minister Tatsuo Morito is cited as having particularly advanced. The Outline called for a “New Life National Movement” aimed at seven goals: heightening the will to work, demonstrating fraternity and cooperation, cultivating a spirit of independence, realizing social justice, establishing rational and democratic living customs, emphasizing art, religion, and sports, and promoting the peace movement. It sought to foster a vigorous new national spirit of self-reliance, mutual aid, and cultural reconstruction amid the hardships of defeat, and was distinct from prewar movements that advocated nationalism or Japanism. Local promotion councils and related efforts continued in some regions and workplaces even after the Katayama Cabinet left office.

== Overview ==
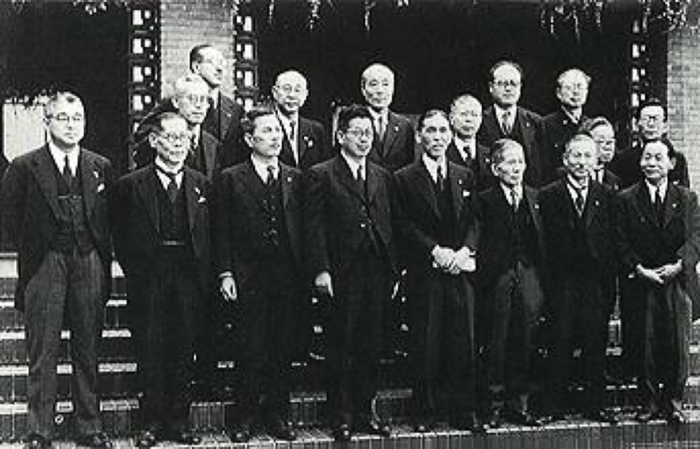
Members of the Katayama Cabinet who decided on the Outline of the New Japan Construction National Movement in a Cabinet meeting

The basic policy was decided by the Cabinet decision of 20 June 1947 entitled "Outline of the New Japan Construction National Movement" (新日本建設国民運動要領).

Tatsuo Morito, Minister of Education, is cited as a promoter of the Outline.

The Outline contained phrases that strongly called for the elevation of the national spirit and culture and for self-enlightenment, such as "a vigorous new spirit filled with positive will and passion aimed at the reconstruction of the fatherland," "a sense of responsibility for self-reliance and self-help and a spirit of mutual aid and fraternity," "a readiness to overcome the hardships of daily life," and "a correctly bright and vigorous cultural Japan of tomorrow."

The Outline called for the development of a "New Life National Movement" to achieve seven goals: "heightening of the will to work," "demonstration of fraternity and cooperation," "cultivation of a spirit of independence," "realization of social justice," "establishment of rational and democratic living customs," "emphasis on art, religion, and sports," and "promotion of the peace movement."

Based on the Outline, books such as The Path to the Construction of a New Japan (edited by the Social Education Federation, now the All-Japan Social Education Federation; published by the Printing Bureau, 1948) were also issued. Chapter 1 was titled "The Present State of Our Country's Economy," and the subsequent chapters were organized according to the seven goals. "Heightening of the will to work" was written by Iwao Ayusawa (last prewar director of the Tokyo Branch of the International Labour Organization and first postwar secretary-general of the Central Labor Relations Commission), "Demonstration of fraternity and cooperation" by the educator Junzō Sasamori, "Cultivation of a spirit of independence" by the economist Seiichirō Takahashi, "Realization of social justice" by Tatsuo Morito, "Establishment of rational and democratic living customs" by the women's movement activist Mumeo Oku, "Emphasis on art, religion, and sports" by the writer Itaru Nii, and "Promotion of the peace movement" by Toyohiko Kagawa, who had begun the New Japan Construction Christian Movement in 1946.

== Targets of mobilization ==
Those targeted for mobilization included representatives of various fields, schools, school-related organizations, youth groups, women's associations, labor unions, farmers' unions, various industrial organizations, legal groups, cultural groups, religious organizations, and others. Mobilization of the media—newspapers, magazines, broadcasting, films, theater, music, literature, etc.—was also sought. The Outline urged the holding of National Movement Conferences throughout the country and the development of the "New Life National Movement" adapted to local conditions, with community centers as bases.

Companies and labor unions were called upon to "thoroughly educate workers and promote recreation movements centered on the workplace." There is a view that this later led to corporate interference in family planning.

The Outline also called for the promotion of political education movements based on the Constitution of Japan, with the Constitution Popularization Association as the main body, but this did not bear fruit because the association was dissolved at the end of 1947. On the other hand, local organizations called New Life Movement Promotion Councils were formed in various places, and even after the Katayama Cabinet resigned and the conservative merger took place, the movement continued in some regions and companies as a community-wide or employee-wide effort.
