= Major party =

Political party with substantial influence in a country's politics

A major party is a political party that holds substantial influence in a country's politics, standing in contrast to a minor party.

According to the Merriam-Webster Dictionary:

Major party: a political party having electoral strength sufficient to permit it to win control of a government usually with comparative regularity and when defeated to constitute the principal opposition to the party in power.

Major parties hold a significant percentage of the vote in elections and claim higher membership than minor parties. Typically, major parties have the most donors, best-organized support networks and excellent funding for elections. Their candidates for political positions are closely watched since they have the highest chance of being elected to office because of the high membership, recognition and donations that these parties are able to generate.

Two major parties can lead to a two-party system. If there is only one major party, then it is a dominant-party system. In a multi-party system, a major party is one that occasionally controls the presidency or premiership and is the most influential party in a coalition government.

Sometimes the laws of a country (or of a state within a federal republic) provide for two parties that are given special treatment, without explicitly naming those parties. For example, the FAQ posted on the website of the Michigan Independent Citizens Redistricting Commission says that "Of the 13 commissioners, four affiliate with the Democratic Party, four affiliate with the Republican Party, and five do not affiliate with either major political party.", but the relevant paragraph of the state constitution says that applicants to be commissioners had to attest "either that they affiliate with one of the two political parties with the largest representation in the legislature (hereinafter, 'major parties'), and if so, identify the party with which they affiliate, or that they do not affiliate with either of the major parties."

== See also ==
- People's party (politics)
- Ruling party
