= People's party (politics) =

Political party popular with various social classes

"People's party" (German: Volkspartei) or "large party" (German: Großpartei) is a political science term mainly used in the German language region, referring to an open and popular political party composed of various social classes, generations, voters, and members. It is different from "class party" (Klassenpartei), "interested party" (Interessenpartei), and "notable's party" (Honoratiorenpartei). The term Volkspartei was first used in political science by the political scientist Dolf Sternberger.

== Example ==
Federal elections in Germany and German governing coalitions since 1949

Federal elections in Germany including abstentions (Nichtwähler). Voter turnout and support for Union and SPD used to be very high.

In Federal elections in Germany from 1949 to 2005, CDU/CSU and SPD had won voting shares of nearly 30% to 50%, with other parties seldom coming over 10%. For decades, they successfully represented nearly the whole adult population of (West) Germany. Then, approval and voter turnout fell, and more parties established themselves. The SPD was first to lose Volkspartei status dropping to 23% voter share in 2009, which due to low voter turnout was well under 20% of voter support. CDU had a bad result in 2021, and even worse, was the first to fail the 5% election threshold in the September 2026 Mecklenburg-Vorpommern state election, losing representation in this parliament, with the SPD having narrowly escaped with 5.5% in the March 2026 Baden-Württemberg state election.

According to Dieter Nohlen, a 'people's party' is "a self-designation used by major parties such as the SPD and CDU/CSU "Union", which strive to achieve strategic majorities by expanding their voter base to gain as many votes as possible. Their political rhetoric and promotional self-presentation is based on the claim that they want to embrace broad sections of the electorate across social classes and ideologies and represent their diverse interests in a balanced manner."

In Austria and Switzerland, the term "large party" (Großpartei) is preferred over "people's party" (Volkspartei) because both countries have a major parties using that name: Austrian People's Party (Österreichische Volkspartei ÖVP) and Swiss People's Party (Schweizerische Volkspartei SVP).

== In Japan ==
In Japan, Volkspartei was translated into 国民政党 (lit. 'national party' or 'people's party'); it refers to a political party that advocates representing the interests of the entire populace rather than specific organizational interests such as labor unions.

The Liberal Democratic Party is a right-wing nationalist party, but because it is a major conservative party exhibiting a transcending class character, it is traditionally classified as a national party in Japanese politics.

The defunct Japan Socialist Party (officially renamed the "Social Democratic Party") aimed to be a 階級政党 (lit. 'class party'). Within the party, the right wing advocated shifting to a centre-left social democratic line and transforming into a national party, while the left wing insisted on maintaining the class party line, leading to a confrontation. The Democratic Socialist Party, founded by a defector of the JSP, openly claimed to be a national party.

Naoto Kan (formerly of the Socialist Democratic Federation) stated in 2017 regarding the founding of the Constitutional Democratic Party of Japan: "For the Constitutional Democratic Party, which aims to be a national party, relationships with existing industry groups and labor unions are of course important. However, in recent years, Japanese society has seen an overwhelming increase in the proportion of people not belonging to such large existing organizations—for example, those working non-regular jobs. It is precisely these people who need ‘politics’ the most within today's unequal society." Similarly, in 2019, Kazuhiro Haraguchi of the Democratic Party for the People described his party's position as "a national party to replace the Liberal Democratic Party."

== List of people's parties ==
=== Active ===
- Austria: Austrian People's Party, Social Democratic Party of Austria
- Germany: Christian Democratic Union of Germany, Christian Social Union in Bavaria, Social Democratic Party of Germany
- Japan: Constitutional Democratic Party of Japan, Democratic Party for the People, Liberal Democratic Party
- Luxembourg: Christian Social People's Party
- Switzerland: Free Democratic Party of Switzerland, Christian Democratic People's Party of Switzerland, Social Democratic Party of Switzerland, Swiss People's Party

The Freedom Party of Austria, which holds the largest number of seats on the National Council as of 2025, but is not part of the traditional Volksparteien.

=== Historical ===
- Japan: Democratic Socialist Party

=== Political party using Volkspartei ===
The following are parties whose party name includes Volkspartei:

- Germany: Bavarian People's Party (BVP), German National People's Party (DNVP), German People's Party (DVP)
- Switzerland: Evangelical People's Party of Switzerland (EVP), Swiss People's Party (SVP)

== See also ==
- Big tent
- Breakthrough (Dutch political history)
- Class collaboration
- Class party – a concept contrasted with "people's party" within the political left (socialist and social-democratic) camp
- Major party
- People's Party (disambiguation)
