= Hidden Supplies Incident =

The Hidden Supplies Incident (隠退蔵物資事件, Intai Zōbusshi Jiken) was an event in which the former Imperial Japanese Armed Forces issued a notice to take precious metals and gems such as diamonds which were appropriated from civilians during the Second World War as well as munitions and military supplies and sell them before the Allied occupation, the majority of which then disappeared.

== Investigation and scandal ==
Later, in 1947, it was discovered that this money was entering the political sphere through Karoku Tsuji (President of Nihon Kagaku Sangyo (日本化学産業), supporter of the Rikken Seiyūkai, and assistant to the founding of the Liberal Party).

The Special Committee on Investigation of Illicit Property Transactions was established in the House of Representatives to investigate the matter. Utilizing the power given the House to investigate national affairs stipulated in the Japanese Constitution, many prominent individuals in politics and business were summoned. This investigation led to the early collapse of the Ashida Cabinet in 1948.

== Aftermath ==
In the wake of the scandal, a Hidden and Stored Materials Incident Investigation Department was established in the public prosecutor's office, which was established based on the Public Prosecutors Office Law enacted on April 16, 1947. It later became the Special Investigation Department of the Tokyo District Public Prosecutors Office.
