= Japan Socialist Party =

Japanese political party (1945–1996)

Japan Socialist Party 日本社会党 Nippon shakai-tō or Nihon shakai-tō
- Leader: Tetsu Katayama (first); Tomiichi Murayama (last)
- Founded: 2 November 1945; 81 years ago
- Dissolved: 19 January 1996; 30 years ago
- Succeeded by: Social Democratic Party
- Headquarters: Social & Cultural Center 1-8-1 Nagata-cho, Chiyoda-ku, Tokyo
- Newspaper: Shakai Shimpō
- Ideology: Socialism; Progressivism; Pacificism; Factions: Democratic socialism; Revolutionary socialism
- Political position: Left-wing; Factions: Centre-left to far-left
- International affiliation: Socialist International
- Colors: Blue

Party flag

The Japan Socialist Party (Japanese: 日本社会党, Hepburn: Nihon Shakai-tō; JSP) was a major socialist, progressive, and left-wing political party in Japan. Established in 1945, the party was the primary representative of the Japanese left and main opponent of the right-wing Liberal Democratic Party for most of its existence.

The JSP was founded in 1945 by members of pre-war proletarian parties, including the Shakai Taishūtō. In the 1947 election, the JSP became the largest party in the National Diet and formed a government under Tetsu Katayama until 1948. From 1951 to 1955, the JSP was split into the Left Socialist Party and the Right Socialist Party, and in 1960 some of its members broke away to form the rival Democratic Socialist Party. In 1955, Japan's two major conservative parties merged to form the Liberal Democratic Party (LDP), which has held power near-continuously since. The JSP was the largest opposition party for the next 40 years, but was incapable of forming a government. Nonetheless, it managed to hold about one third of the seats in the National Diet during this period, preventing the LDP from revising the Constitution of Japan.

Under the leadership of Takako Doi, the JSP achieved brief resurgence in the 1990 election before losing many of its seats in the 1993 election. In 1994, JSP leader Tomiichi Murayama became prime minister of a coalition government before the coalition collapsed in 1996. The JSP's period in the government alienated many of its traditional supporters, and it was reconstituted in 1996 as the Social Democratic Party, which became a minor party. The Democratic Party of Japan replaced the JSP as the main opposition to the LDP.

== History ==
=== Foundation ===
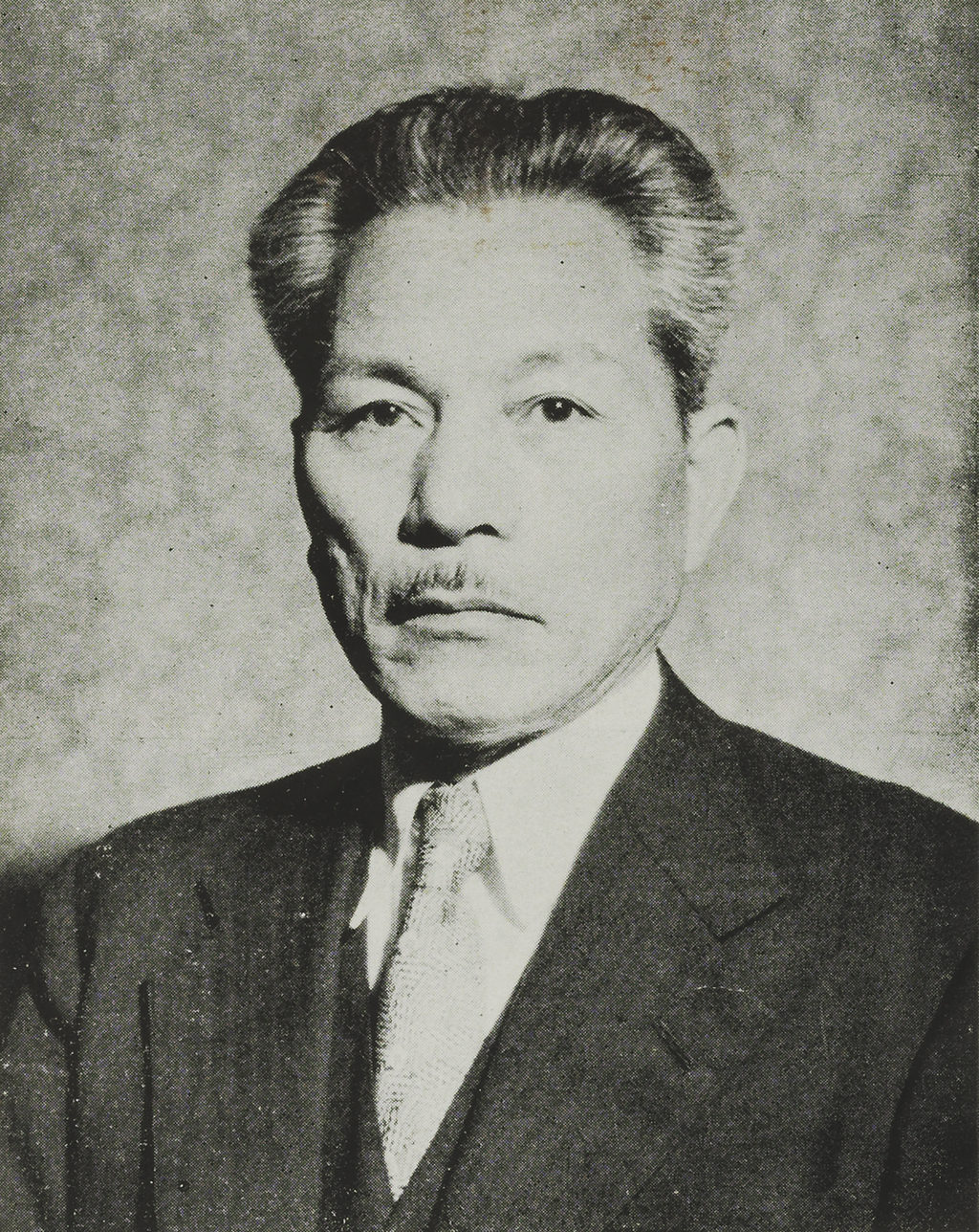
Suehiro Nishio

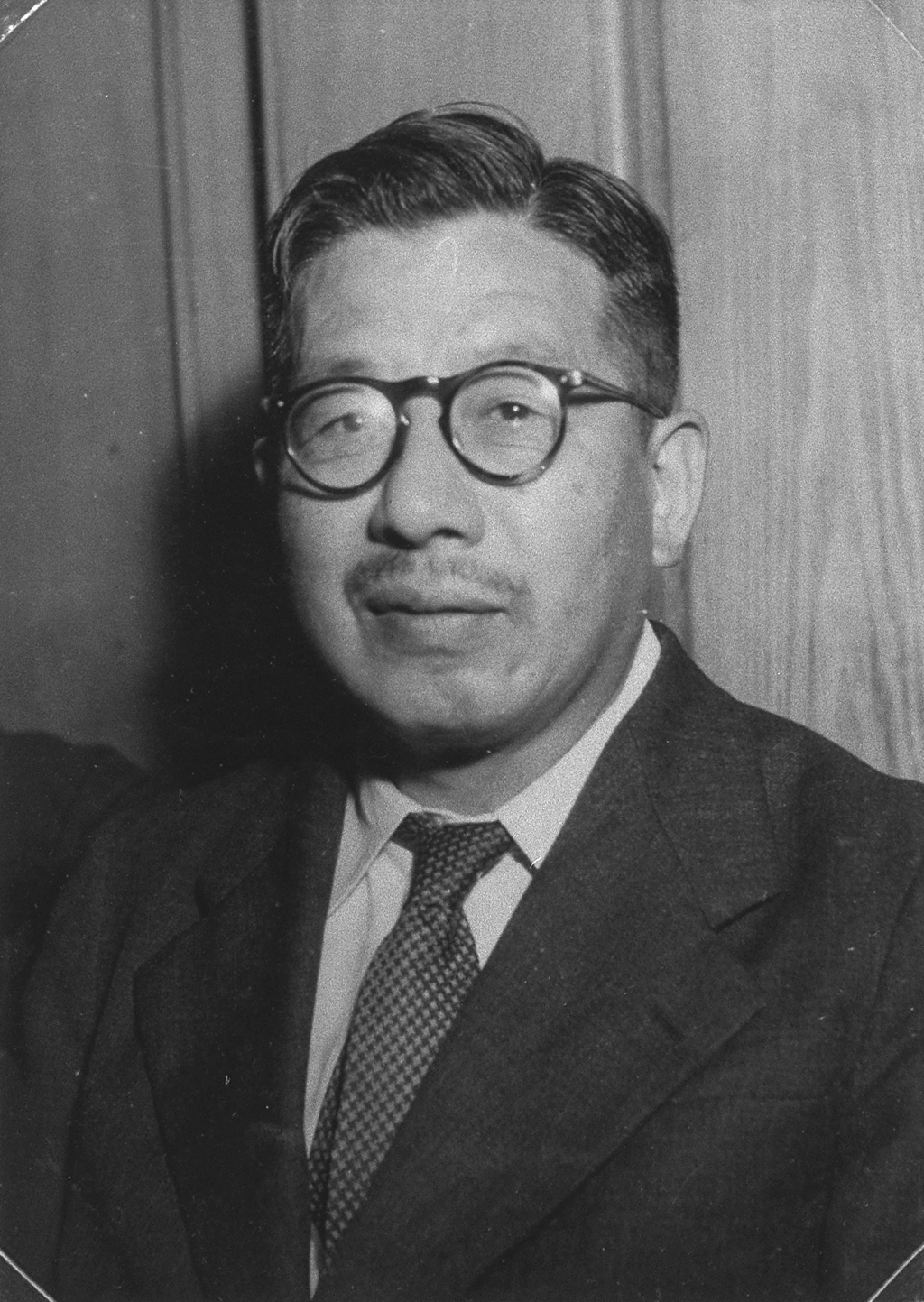
Tetsu Katayama

Suehiro Nishio and Tetsu Katayama were among the founders of the Japan Socialist Party and held leadership positions within it. Katayama served as Prime Minister of Japan from 1947 to 1948. Nishio broke away from the party in 1960, and formed the Democratic Socialist Party.

The two major left-wing political parties in Japan in the 1930s were the Labour-Farmer Masses Party and Social Democratic Party. They merged into the Shakai Taishūtō in 1932, and were the third-largest party in the after the 1937 election. It was dissolved in 1940 due to the Imperial Rule Assistance Association.

Suehiro Nishio started talking about creating a new socialist party with Chōzaburō Mizutani and Komakichi Matsuoka shortly after Emperor Hirohito's surrender broadcast. Thirteen former members of the National Diet announced their intention to form a new party on 5 September 1945. This organization was officially formed on November 2. It was given the Japanese name Nihon Shakai-tō (Socialist Party of Japan), but given the official English name of Social Democratic Party of Japan. At the founding congress the party adopted the short three-point 1945 platform (accompanied by a detailed set of General Policies).

An inaugural committee of 25 members was formed. The founding convention was chaired by Tetsu Katayama and Nishio was elected General Secretary. Nishio, Mizutani, and other inaugural committee members were appointed to the party's executive committee.

=== Katayama government ===
The Japanese Communist Party (JCP), unbanned and its leaders freed from prison in October 1945, asked the JSP to form a common political front of Japan's democratic parties. The JSP declined stating that neither had formally established their parties or policies yet. The JSP believed that the coalition would aid the party, but did not believe that the JSP was organized enough to maintain control over it. Morito Tatsuo proposed the creation of a Democratic League for National Salvation after the 1946 election so that the JSP could establish itself as the leader. The JSP's Central Executive Committee voted to end negotiations with the JCP on 14 July 1946.

The JSP initially selected a limited amount of candidates for the 1946 elections. However, the party drastically increased its candidate amount after the Purge Directive, issued on 4 January 1946, greatly reduced the membership of right-wing parties. Conservatives attempted to form a government with right-wing members of the JSP, but the Liberal Party and JSP were unable to.

The JSP rejected an offer from the JCP to work together in the 1947 election. The JSP became the largest party in the election with 143 seats. It formed a coalition government under Katayama with the Democratic Party and the Citizens' Cooperation Party. Katayama was the first socialist to lead Japan. Shortly after the full cabinet was appointed, Katayama delivered the radio address known as the Appeal to the Nation (2 June 1947) and, on 1 July, his first administrative policy speech to the Diet under the new Constitution; these statements outlined the coalition's centrist orientation, commitment to the Constitution, and response to the postwar economic crisis. Despite its short life the government enacted a series of progressive reforms: the National Public Service Act, dissolution of the Home Ministry, police reorganisation, establishment of the Construction Board and the Ministry of Labour, introduction of unemployment insurance, thorough revision of the Civil Code that abolished the feudal family system, and revision of the Criminal Code. It also pursued nationalisation and state-control policies, creating numerous public corporations and expanding public lending on sometimes dubious fiscal grounds. The Temporary Coal Mining Control Law in particular proved highly controversial and required five months of revision before passage, accelerating the erosion of support within the ruling parties. A further crisis over the dismissal of Agriculture Minister Rikizō Hirano and the subsequent appointment of his successor led to open factional strife; the cabinet resigned after only eight months without waiting for the budget to pass. Katayama's coalition fell in February 1948, in large part due to inexperience and subsequent poor performance in leading the government. A new cabinet was formed under the leadership of Hitoshi Ashida, a member of the Democrats. Ashida's tenure was marked by labor disputes and he resigned after eight months due to a corruption scandal. A caretaker government was formed under the leadership of Shigeru Yoshida. Nishio, who was involved in the corruption scandal and arrested, was expelled from the JSP, but later readmitted into the right-wing JSP in 1952.

Members of Hisao Kuroda's JSP faction in the Diet were expelled after voting against the budget during Ashida's tenure. Kuroda and his supporters broke away and formed the Labourers and Farmers Party. The JSP attempted to delay the 1949 election as it feared massive losses. The JSP's seat total fell from 148 to 48. The JSP rejected efforts by the Sanbetsu to form a united opposition of the JSP, JCP, and Labourers and Farmers against Yoshida's government. JSP members who left to form the Labourers and Farmers Party were readmitted in 1957.

In the period immediately following the end of World War II, the JSP had played a key role in the drafting of the new Japanese constitution, adding progressive articles related to issues such as health, welfare and working conditions. Unfortunately for the JSP and the broader Japanese left in the immediate postwar era, their time in power coincided with a change in U.S. policy towards Japan commonly known as the Reverse Course. Beginning around 1947, and intensifying with the victory of the Communists over the Nationalists in the Chinese Civil War in 1949, the U.S. occupation government headed by Douglas MacArthur felt the need to revise its previously conciliatory stance towards the kinds of policies pursued by Japanese leftists, from the breakup of Zaibatsu, the country's business conglomerates, to land reform, to the ousting of nationalist figures in government. Apart from reversing early steps taken towards implementing these policies, the U.S. occupation government oversaw and assisted in the purging of almost 30,000 workers deemed to be "red" between 1948 and 1950, frustrating leftist attempts to hold on to state power.

Early factional conflict over the nature of the party (national party versus class party) crystallised in the Morito–Inamura dispute of 1949–50.

=== Fracture and reunification ===
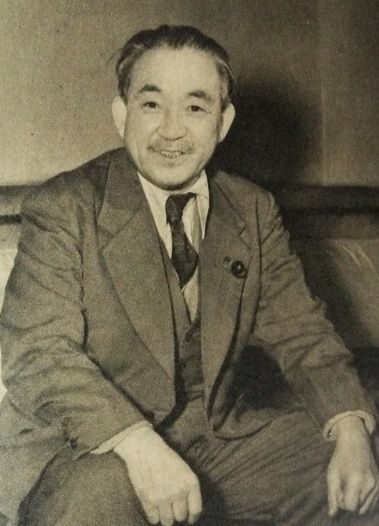
Mosaburō Suzuki

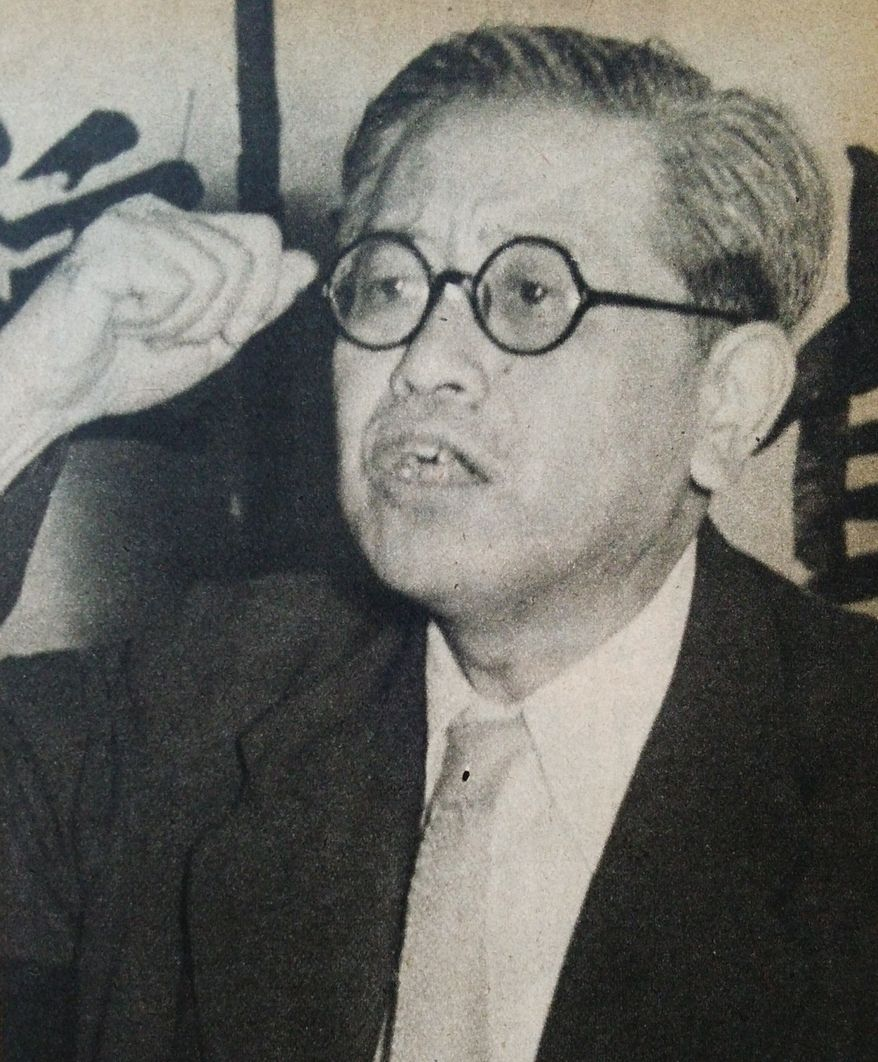
Jōtarō Kawakami

In 1951, the JSP broke apart into the Left Socialist Party of Japan and Right Socialist Party of Japan, led by Mosaburō Suzuki and Jōtarō Kawakami, respectively.

The party's 1949 convention was postponed until after the year's election. The party leadership, including multiple members of the Central Executive Committee, resigned following the party's defeat. The party's right-wing wanted to rename the organization to the Social Democratic Party while the left-wing wanted to retain its name, which was approved. The left-wing wanted the entire right-wing leadership to resign, Katayama retained as chairman, and Mosaburō Suzuki appointed as Secretary General. Inejirō Asanuma was the right-wing candidate for Secretary General. Asanuma defeated Suzuki in the nominating committee's vote with 31 to 30, but lost the convention vote 390 to 261. Katayama was reelected as chairman.

By the time of the 1950 convention the party's factions formed two youth leagues. The left-wing controlled the official Youth Department while the right-wing formed the Independent Youth League. The Youth Department, which held its convention before the party's, demanded the expulsion of all members of the Independent Youth League and prepared a motion of no confidence against Katayama. The left-wing held greater control over the convention than in the previous year, holding almost all of the committee chairmanships. Katayama declined to run for reelection and the right-wing walked out of the convention.

Members of the Diet who were not aligned with either faction formed the Unification Discussion Group. The two factions held separate conventions, but worked together in the Diet due to spring labor disputes and threats from the National Railway Workers' Union to pull its support for the party. The three groups reunited on 3 April, after three months of negation. The position of chairman was left vacant, but Asanuma was made Secretary General. The Central Executive Committee was divided between fifteen left-wingers, nine right-wingers, and six centrists.

In the 1950 elections the JSP won the governorship of Kyoto Prefecture and became the second-largest party in the House of Councillors while the JCP declined in strength. The party's factions were heavily divided over the Treaty of San Francisco and Treaty of Mutual Cooperation and Security between the United States and Japan. The party's convention was held on 23 October 1951, and divided into the Right Socialist Party of Japan and Left Socialist Party of Japan after seventeen hours. In the Diet the left-wing voted against both treaties while the right-wing supported the peace treaty and opposed the security treaty. The party remained united at the prefecture level until the final prefecture division in 1953.

The Left Socialists selected Suzuki as chairman and Masaru Nomizo as Secretary General while the Right Socialists selected Asanuma as Secretary General and initially left the position of chairman vacant. Jōtarō Kawakami was later elected Chairman of the Right Socialists. At the time of the schism the JSP's House of Representatives membership was divided into 30 Right Socialists and 16 Left Socialists. Their seat totals rose to 57 for the Right Socialists and 54 for the Left Socialists after the 1952 election. Despite this divided membership the two groups worked together in the Diet with Kaishintō and disaffected Liberals to pass motions of no confidence against Minister of Finance Hayato Ikeda.

In 1953, Yoshida lost a vote of no confidence to the socialists and conservatives after disaffected Liberals abstained and new elections were called. The Left Socialists overtook the Right Socialists in seat count in the general election. In the House of Councillors election the Left Socialists rose from 30 to 41 seats while the Right Socialists declined from 30 to 26 seats. The Right Socialists attempted to form a coalition with the Left Socialists, Kaishintō, and disaffected Liberals. This failed as Minoru Takano failed to convince the Left Socialists, who wanted Suzuki as prime minister, to accept Mamoru Shigemitsu, the Kaishintō leader, as prime minister. Yoshida became prime minister again after two ballots and Kaishintō announced that it would end its partnership with the socialists.

Factions in the JSP in 1959
Leader	Ideology	House of Representatives	House of Councillors
Suehiro Nishio	Right-wing	27 / 467	17 / 250
Jōtarō Kawakami	Right-wing	29 / 467	10 / 250
Mosaburō Suzuki	Left-wing	39 / 467	20 / 250
Hiroo Wada	Left-wing	29 / 467	10 / 250
Jiichirō Matsumoto	Left-wing	12 / 467	0 / 250
Masaru Nomizo	Left-wing	5 / 467	15 / 250
Hisao Kuroda	Left-wing	6 / 467	0 / 250

Yoshida lost a motion of no confidence supported by the Japan Democratic Party and Socialists on 7 December 1954. Ichirō Hatoyama replaced him and new elections were called. The Left and Right Socialists, faced with Hatoyama's popularity, adopted the same platform. The two groups held conventions on 18 January 1955, in which they called to reunify after the election. The combined Socialist seat total, 156, was greater than their seat total during Katayama's government. Unification negotiation committees met in April and the platform it created was accepted by a united convention on 13 October (reunification and the 1955 Unified Platform). Suzuki was appointed as chairman and Asanuma as Secretary General. The Central Executive Committee and Control Commission was divided equally between the two factions. The left-wing gained a 22 to 18 seat majority on the Central Executive Committee at the 1957 convention.

During the period of division the Left Socialists adopted their own Left Socialist Platform (1954); the Right Socialists likewise formulated a distinct Right Socialist Platform.

The JSP made minor gains in the 1958 general election and 1959 House of Councillors election. It performed poorly in the 1959 gubernatorial election, including the loss of the governorship of Hokkaido. The JSP was harmed as the JCP, which had strategically withdrawn its candidates in other elections, declined to do so in the 1958 and 1959 elections.

=== Divisions and Asanuma's assassination ===
The party split again in 1960 because of internal disagreement over how to conduct the ongoing Anpo protests against revision of the security treaty and whether or not to cooperate with the JCP in doing so. Left-wingers from Sōhyō and the Youth Division, with backing from supporters of Hiroo Wada and Jiichirō Matsumoto, had attempted to expel Nishio at the 1959 convention, but it failed in the Steering Committee. Nishio attacked the left-wing for serving Sōhyō. The Association for Party Reconstruction, which called for "democratic socialism" that received support from "the whole nation, not merely the labor unions and farmers' organizations", held a convention attended by 300 right-wing leaders and 28 Diet members. The Socialist Club, under the leadership of Nishio, had 12 members in the House of Councillors and 21 in the House of Representatives. This organization broke away to form the Democratic Socialist Party (DSP) on 24 January 1960.

Pulitzer Prize-winning photograph by Yasushi Nagao. The photo was taken directly after Yamaguchi stabbed Asanuma and is here seen attempting a second stab, although he was restrained before that could happen.

Asanuma was elected chairman of the JSP at the 1960 convention. Asanuma was assassinated by a right-wing youth, Otoya Yamaguchi, during a televised election debate on 12 October 1960. Asanuma had been a charismatic figure who had been able to hold the antagonistic left and right factions of the party together through the force of his personality. Asanuma's untimely death deprived the party of his adroit leadership, and thrust Saburō Eda into the leadership role instead. Eda was hastily named "Acting Chairman" of the JSP and became the party's leader and candidate to become prime minister of Japan should the party triumph in the election. A centrist, Eda rapidly took the party in a more centrist direction, far faster than the left socialists were ready to accept. This led to growing infighting within the party, and drastically damaged its ability to present a cohesive message to the public.

In particular, Eda earned the enmity of the party's left-wing due to his ambitious platform of "structural reform" (kōzō kaikaku) and his related "Eda Vision" of socialism. The "structural reform" platform drew inspiration from the recently concluded Anpo protests against the U.S.-Japan Security Treaty, which had achieved massive size and forced the resignation of conservative prime minister Nobusuke Kishi. Eda and his allies viewed these protests as having been an unalloyed success in having allowed the JSP to play a leading role in fomenting a mass movement. Eda's "structural reform" platform called for a combination of parliamentary pressure tactics and Anpo-style extra-parliamentary mass movements that would gradually move Japan toward socialism by forcing the government into a series of piecemeal concessions. Above all, Eda and his fellow structural reformers hoped to broaden the base of the JSP beyond a hard core of labor unionists, leftist student activists, and Marxist intellectuals to encompass people from many walks of life, in order to dramatically increase the party's potential supporters at the polls.

In an effort to build popular support for his reform program, Eda announced his "New Vision of Socialism", better known by its nickname, the "Eda Vision", in July 1962. Eda declared that "[s]ocialism must be defined in sunny and cheerful terms that are easily understandable to the masses. I believe that 'socialism' is that which allows human potential to blossom to its fullest extent. The main four accomplishments that humankind has achieved so far are America's high standard of living, the Soviet Union's thoroughgoing social welfare system, England's parliamentary democracy, and Japan's peace constitution. I believe that if we can integrate these, we can give birth to a broad-based socialism."

The "Eda Vision" of a more moderate form of socialism was received enthusiastically in the mainstream Japanese press, and polled well in public opinion polls. However, it did not lead to any significant expansion of party membership; in 1961, the JSP made a push to increase its membership to over 100,000 within the next three years, but only 363 members were added over the next six months. Moreover, the "Eda Vision" was the final straw for the more orthodox Marxist left-wing factions in the JSP, who had already chafed against the moderate tone of Eda's "structural reform" platform. In particular, they could not accept praise of what they viewed as the "imperialist" United States and Great Britain, and the "deviationist" and "Stalinist" Soviet Union.

At the 22nd Party Congress in November 1962, the left wing of the JSP revolted, and succeeded in persuading a majority of party members present to adopt an "Eda Vision Criticism Resolution" that renounced the "Eda Vision" as antithetical to core party principles. Eda was forced to resign his position as Secretary General, and thereafter the party returned to a more dogmatically Marxist platform which emphasized the urban working classes as the party's main political base. This move to the left was the result of the split within the JSP, with the creation of the Democratic Socialist Party leading to a leftward shift in the balance of power within the party. This culminated in the adoption in 1964–66 of the programmatic document The Road to Socialism in Japan (commonly called “The Road”), which rejected both a purely reformist approach and the welfare state (described as ‘a device to prolong capitalism’) and conceived of a socialist parliamentary majority presiding over a transitional government that would eventually inaugurate ‘a kind of class rule’ by the proletariat.

Thereafter, a younger generation of reform-minded activists became disillusioned and began to drift away from the party. At the same time, the emergence of the "Clean Government Party" (Kōmeitō), the political wing of the Sokka Gakkai Buddhist religious movement, and the increasing electoral success of the Japan Communist Party, began to eat away at the JSP's urban working class base. The Socialists slipped in the polls in the 1967 election, lost more ground in the 1968 Upper House election, and suffered a crushing repudiation in 1969, when they lost 51 seats in the National Diet.

=== 1970s ===
In some regions, the party continued to perform well at the local level and by the 1970s many areas were run by JSP (or JSP-backed) mayors and governors, who supported environmental protection initiatives and introduced new social welfare programs. Meanwhile, Saburō Eda continued his efforts to reform the party and expand its base. Eda ran numerous times for the post of party chairman, but was unsuccessful, although he did serve a second stint as Secretary General from 1968 to 1970. Nevertheless, Eda remained popular among the broader Japanese public and in the mid-1970s conservative prime minister Kakuei Tanaka said at a press conference, "If the Japan Socialist Party were ever to make Eda its Chairman again, a general election would be terrifying. They would drastically expand their seats in the Diet." Eda could never overcome the undying animosity his "Eda Vision" had won him from his party's left-wing.

In 1976, Eda lost his reelection bid and was booted from the Diet. Blaming his loss on his party's dogmatic, doctrinaire Marxism and desperate for reform, he attempted to resign from the JSP but the party refused to accept his resignation and voted to expel him instead. The following year, Eda and Hideo Den led a small group of JSP Diet members to split from the JSP and form a new party called the Socialist Democratic Federation.

=== 1980s ===
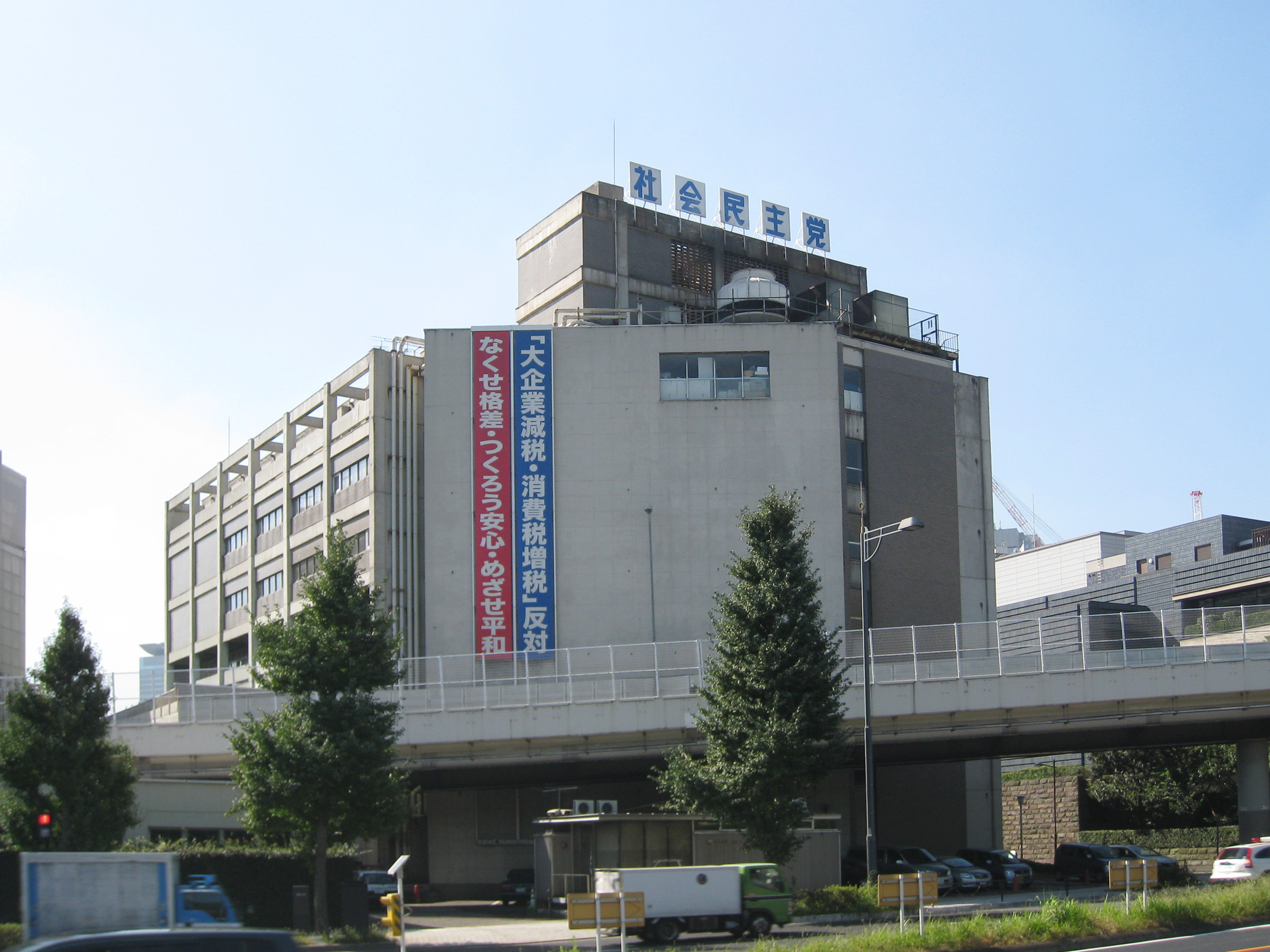
Former JSP Head Office in Nagatacho, the Social & Cultural Center (Shakai Bunka Kaikan)

In January 1986, the JSP adopted the New Declaration of the Japan Socialist Party (officially “New Declaration of the Japan Socialist Party – Creation through Love, Knowledge, and Power”), which advocated a gradual reformist approach for achieving socialism and whose basic policy objective was to realise a West European-style social democracy. The New Declaration marked a decisive break from the earlier “class-based mass party” identity and from Japanese-style social democracy, redefining the party as a “national party.” Despite this move towards moderation, under party chairman Masashi Ishibashi the JSP suffered a disastrous double defeat in both houses of the National Diet in the simultaneously held 1986 Japanese general election and 1986 Japanese House of Councillors election. Losing in a rout to the Liberal Democratic Party (LDP) under popular prime minister Yasuhiro Nakasone, the JSP's seats in the lower house fell from 112 to a new all-time low of 85 and its share of the popular vote dropped from 19.5 percent to 17.2 percent. This defeat led the party to elect Takako Doi as party chair, making her the first woman to ever lead a Japanese political party. Doi was popular with the Japanese public led the JSP to an electoral comeback with an impressive showing in the 1990 Japanese general election, winning 136 seats and 24.4 percent of the vote. Some electoral districts had more than one successful socialist candidate. Doi's decision to put up more than one candidate for each of the 130 districts represented a controversial break with the past because unlike their LDP counterparts many party candidates did not want to run against each other; however, the great majority of the 149 socialist candidates who ran were successful, including seven of eight women.

Doi, a university professor of constitutional law before entering politics, had a tough, straight-talking manner that appealed to voters tired of the evasiveness of other politicians. Many women found her a refreshing alternative to submissive female stereotypes and in the late 1980s the public at large in opinion polls voted her their favorite politician (the runner-up in these surveys was equally tough-talking conservative LDP member Shintarō Ishihara); however, Doi's popularity was of limited aid to the party, as the powerful Shakaishugi Kyokai (Japan Socialist Association), which was supported by a contingent of the party's 76,000-strong membership and whose views were expressed in the Japan Socialist Association Theses, remained committed to orthodox Marxism, impeding Doi's efforts to promote what she called perestroika and a more moderate program with greater voter appeal.

In 1983, Doi's predecessor as chairman Masashi Ishibashi had begun the delicate process of moving the party away from its strong opposition to the Self-Defense Forces. While maintaining that these forces were unconstitutional in light of Article 9, he claimed that because they had been established through legal procedures, they had a legitimate status (this phrasing was changed a year later to say that the Self-Defense Forces exist legally). Ishibashi also broke past precedent by visiting Washington to talk with United States political leaders. By the end of the decade, the party had accepted the Self-Defense Forces and the 1960 U.S.-Japan Security Treaty. It advocated strict limitations on military spending (no more than 1 percent of GNP annually), a suspension of joint military exercises with United States forces, and a reaffirmation of the three non-nuclear principles (no production, possession, or introduction of nuclear weapons into Japanese territory).

Doi expressed support for balanced ties with the Democratic People's Republic of Korea (North Korea) and the Republic of Korea (South Korea). In the past, the party had favored the Kim Il Sung regime in Pyongyang and in the early 1990s it still refused to recognize the normalization of relations between Tokyo and Seoul with Treaty on Basic Relations between Japan and the Republic of Korea (1965). In domestic policy, the party demanded the continued protection of agriculture and small business in the face of foreign pressure, abolition of the consumption tax and an end to the construction and use of nuclear power reactors. As a symbolic gesture to reflect its new moderation, the party dropped its commitment to socialist revolution at its April 1990 convention and described its goal as social democracy, the creation of a society in which "all people fairly enjoy the fruits of technological advancement and modern civilization and receive the benefits of social welfare." Delegates also elected Doi to a third term as party chairwoman.

Because of the party's self-definition as a class-based party and its symbiotic relationship with the General Council of Trade Unions of Japan (Sōhyō), the public-sector workers' confederation, few efforts were made to attract non-union constituencies. Although some Sōhyō unions supported the Japanese Communist Party, the party remained the representative of Sohyo's political interests until the merger with private-sector unions and the Japanese Trade Union Confederation (Rengō) in 1989. Because of declining union financial support during the 1980s, some party Diet members turned to dubious fund-raising methods. One was involved in the Recruit affair. Like other parties, it sold large blocks of fund-raising party tickets and the LDP even gave individual party Diet members funds from time to time to persuade them to cooperate in passing difficult legislation.

=== 1990s ===
As part of the fallout of the Recruit Scandal, the party secured a mere 70 seats (down from 137) in the 1993 Japanese general election while the LDP lost its majority in the lower house for the first time since the 1983 Japanese general election and was out of government for the first time in 38 years. The anti-LDP coalition government of Morihiro Hosokawa was formed by reformists who had triggered the 1993 election by leaving the LDP (Japan Renewal Party and New Party Sakigake), a liberal party formed only a year before (Japan New Party), the traditional centre-left opposition (Kōmeitō, Democratic Socialist Party and Socialist Democratic Federation) and the Democratic Reform Party, the political arm of the Rengō trade union federation, together with the JSP. In 1994, the JSP and the New Sakigake Party decided to leave the non-LDP coalition. The minority Hata cabinet lasted only a few weeks.

The JSP then formed a grand coalition (dai-renritsu) government with the LDP and the New Party Sakigake under JSP Prime Minister Tomiichi Murayama, who was leader of the party from 1993 to 1996. Most of the other parties from the anti-LDP coalition, now forced back into opposition, united to form the New Frontier Party (NFP), which overtook the JSP as second largest political party in Japan. The JSP suffered a defeat in the 1995 Japanese House of Councillors election. In January 1996, the New Socialist Party of Japan split off from the JSP, Murayama resigned as Prime Minister, and the JSP changed its name from the JSP to the Social Democratic Party (SDP) as an interim party for forming a new party. The final programmatic statement of the JSP era was the 95 Declaration of the Japan Socialist Party.

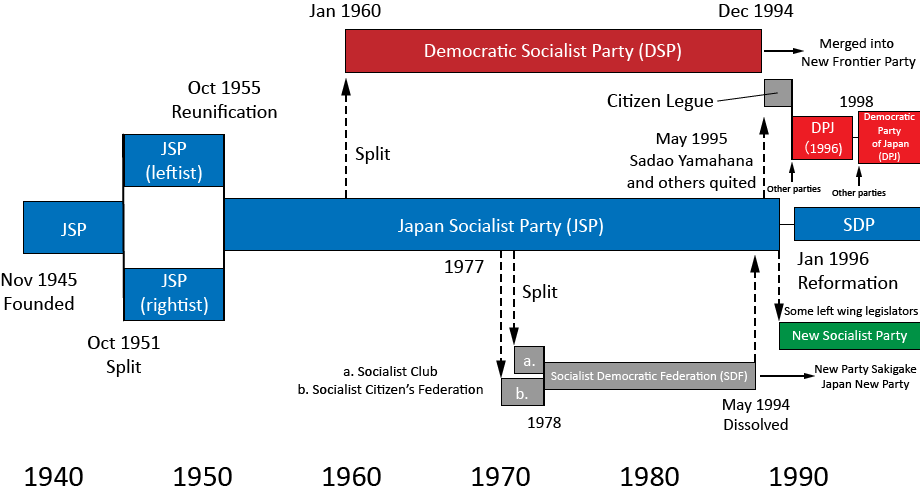
An illustration of the history of JSP

== Factions and membership ==
Nomizo and his faction were affiliated with agricultural workers and unions. Their power in the JSP waned after land reforms in the 1950s. Matsumoto and his faction found support among the Burakumin, whose rights Matsumoto advocated for. The JSP consistently received around 10-20% of the female vote. In 1957, women were estimated to account for 10% of the JSP's membership and the party had eleven female members in the Diet.

=== Agriculture ===
The Japan Farmers' Union was officially not aligned with any party, but its leadership were members of the JSP. Five of the union's seven executive members were elected to the Diet, including Kuroda and Nomizo. Rikizō Hirano, the Minister of Agriculture and aligned with the JSP's right-wing, led 15% of the union to break away into League for Revivifying the Japan Farmers' Union (later renamed to the All-Japan Farmers' Union) after continued disputes with the left-wing and communists at the union's 1947 convention. 31 of the 143 seats won by the JSP in the 1947 election were held by officers of the Japan Farmers' Union and an additional 8 were held by members of Hirano's union. Nomizo attempted to become Minister of Agriculture after Hirano's dismissal, but the right-wing successfully opposed him.

In the face of rising communist influence in the union JSP members formed the League for the Establishment of Independence in 1948, while Kuroda and the communists formed the Unity Discussion Group. The union broke apart into the Independence Group and Unity Group as these two groups held separate conventions on 22 April 1949. New agrarian groups were formed after the JSP broke apart into the Left and Right parties. The Independence Group was aligned with the Left JSP. The Right JSP had the New Village Construction Group of the Japan Farmers' Union, but it never held a convention during its existence and was poorly organized. The All-Japan Famers' Union federated with this organization and formed the General Federation of Farmers' Union after Hirano joined the Right JSP. A sample of 48 Left JSP and 33 Right JSP candidates in 1955 showed that 31 Left JSP candidates had farmer union support compared to 7 Right JSP candidates. The All-Japan Farmers' Union, New Village Construction Group, a rump faction of the Independence Group unified into the National Japan Farmers' Union in 1958. Another schism occurred as supporters of Nishio left to form the All-Japan Farmers' Federation aligned with the DSP.

=== Labor ===
Sōhyō, the largest labor federation in Japan, was aligned with the JSP's left wing, while the National Railway Workers' Union was aligned with the right wing. The Red Purge resulted in the amount of unions falling by 5,500 and union membership falling by 880,000 in 1949 alone. Sōhyō's membership fell to below 47,000 in this period, but grew to 3.7 million by 1962. Sōhyō had three major factions during the JSP's split in the 1950s. The left-wing Worker Comrades Society had ties to the Suzuki and Wada factions, a communist faction under Minoru Takano's leadership, and right-wing Democratic Labor Movement Study Group. The Democratic Labor Movement Study Group broke away to form the All-Japan Trade Union Congress in April 1954. 26 representatives and 38 councilors were affiliated with Sōhyō after the 1956 election. Polling by The Asahi Shimbun in October 1948 showed that 40% of unionized workers supported the JSP and that 18% of non-unionized workers supported them. These figures was 39% and 28% respectively in 1949, and 37% and 26% in 1950.

== Ideology ==
=== Domestic ===
The JSP is generally regarded as having been a progressive left-wing party that opposed the conservative right-wing Liberal Democratic Party (LDP). The JSP is also considered a centre-left party, but there was a far-left faction within the party. The "leftists" in the JSP were Marxists in favour of scientific socialism. By contrast, the "rightists" were in favour of social democracy and aimed at establishing a welfare state. The party was generally the mainstay of the "Kakushin" (radical-liberal forces) camp.

==== Party platforms and programmatic documents ====
The successive platforms and programmatic statements of the JSP included:

- the short three-point 1945 founding platform (maintained formally until 1955);
- the separate Left Socialist Platform (1954) and Right Socialist Platform adopted during the 1951–55 split;
- the 1955 Unified Platform adopted at reunification;
- The Road to Socialism in Japan (1964–66, commonly “The Road”), the dominant left-oriented programmatic document until the mid-1980s;
- the New Declaration of the Japan Socialist Party (1986), which redefined the party as a national rather than class-based mass party and aligned it more closely with Western social democracy, distancing it from Japanese-style social democracy;
- the 95 Declaration of the Japan Socialist Party (1995), the final statement of the JSP era.

The JSP's foundation program in 1945 was three sentences long and stated that the party was "the national rally of the laboring strata". This program was maintained until 1955. Both nationalization, supported by the left-wing, and socialization, supported by the right-wing, were in the 1955 platform. In the 1950s the party supported a five-year plan to socialize the electricity, coal, iron and steel, chemical fertilizer, transportation, and cement industries. The party supported a minimum wage of ¥15000 (equivalent to ¥88,195 in 2024) in 1961.

After Takako Doi became party leader, the JSP established a European-style democratic socialism line. Apart from the party's socialist identity, the Murayama Cabinet, which came to power between 1994 and 1996, supported social-liberal reform. The JSP opposed Shintoist social conservatism, and was politically friendly with Christianity in the United States. There were quite a few Christians in the JSP. Former Japanese Prime Minister Tetsu Katayama was also a Christian.

The party’s long-standing self-definition as a class party / class-based mass party was a central point of contention (see also the Morito–Inamura dispute). The left-leaning Japan Socialist Association and its Japan Socialist Association Theses exerted strong influence on the party’s Marxist wing until the late 1980s.

=== Foreign ===
The JSP supported a neutralist foreign policy, and opposed amending the Constitution of Japan, especially the Article 9 of the Constitution of Japan. Japan's left-wing liberalism emerged as a "peace movement" and was largely led by the JSP. Suzuki stated that he wanted Japan to follow Yugoslavia's brand of neutrality rather than Austria's. The left-wing participated in anti-American military base protests in 1953, while the right-wing did not. The party was critical of nuclear testing done by the United States and Soviet Union.

The JSP was also divided in its approach towards peace with the Allied Powers, with the left-wing advocating for peace treaties with all involved countries while the right-wing supporting the Treaty of San Francisco despite it excluding certain nations. Alongside this, parts of the right-wing such as Eiichi Nishimura and Tadashi Kodaira advocated for the return of Southern Sakhalin and the entirety of the Kuril Islands and successfully got both included in the 1955 platform alongside the return of the Bonin Islands and Okinawa Prefecture.

The party interacted with the North Korea's Korean Social Democratic Party. The party was also strongly opposed to the far-right South Korea's anti-communist dictatorship, including Park Chung Hee and Chun Doo-hwan, and allied with South Korean liberals, including Kim Dae-jung. The JSP ended its support for the Two Chinas policy in 1957, and recognized the People's Republic of China rather than the Republic of China. In the early 1990s the party was a signatory to the Three-Party Joint Declaration on Japan–North Korea Relations.

The JSP supported Gamal Abdel Nasser's nationalization of the Suez Canal. The party's factions were heavily divided by the Hungarian Revolution of 1956, with the right-wing supported Hungary and the left-wing supporting the Soviet Union, before a compromise was made stating that "the subsequent de-Stalinization and liberalization were somewhat taken advantage of by reactionary forces, the armed intervention of the Soviet Union cannot be condoned".

(The New Japan Construction National Movement was an early postwar initiative associated with parts of the socialist movement.)

== Leaders ==
No.	Photo	Name (Birth–death)	Constituency / title	Term of office		Election results	Prime Minister (term)
No.	Photo	Name (Birth–death)	Constituency / title	Took office	Left office	Election results	Prime Minister (term)
Chair of the Social Democratic Party of Japan (1946–1950)
1		Tetsu Katayama (1887–1978)	Rep for Kanagawa 3rd	28 September 1946	16 January 1950	—	Yoshida 1946–47
1		Tetsu Katayama (1887–1978)	Rep for Kanagawa 3rd	28 September 1946	16 January 1950	—	himself 1947–48
1		Tetsu Katayama (1887–1978)	Rep for Kanagawa 3rd	28 September 1946	16 January 1950	—	Ashida 1948
1		Tetsu Katayama (1887–1978)	Rep for Kanagawa 3rd	28 September 1946	16 January 1950	—	Yoshida 1948–54
Chair of the Japanese Socialist Party, Left (1951–1955)
—		Mosaburō Suzuki (1893–1970)	Rep for Tokyo 3rd	18 January 1951	12 October 1955	—	Yoshida 1948–54
—		Mosaburō Suzuki (1893–1970)	Rep for Tokyo 3rd	18 January 1951	12 October 1955	—	Hatoyama I. 1954–56
Chair of the Social Democratic Party of Japan, Right (1952–1955)
—		Jōtarō Kawakami (1889–1965)	Rep for Hyogo 1st	25 August 1952	12 October 1955	—	Yoshida 1948–54
—		Jōtarō Kawakami (1889–1965)	Rep for Hyogo 1st	25 August 1952	12 October 1955	—	Hatoyama I. 1954–56
Chair of the Social Democratic Party of Japan, Unified (1955–1996)
2		Mosaburō Suzuki (1893–1970)	Rep for Tokyo 3rd	12 October 1955	23 March 1960	—	Hatoyama I. 1954–56
2		Mosaburō Suzuki (1893–1970)	Rep for Tokyo 3rd	12 October 1955	23 March 1960	—	Ishibashi 1956–57
2		Mosaburō Suzuki (1893–1970)	Rep for Tokyo 3rd	12 October 1955	23 March 1960	—	Kishi 1957–60
3		Inejiro Asanuma (1898–1960)	Rep for Tokyo 1st	23 March 1960	12 October 1960 (assassinated)	1960 Inejirō Asanuma – 228; Jōtarō Kawakami – 206	Kishi 1957–60
3		Inejiro Asanuma (1898–1960)	Rep for Tokyo 1st	23 March 1960	12 October 1960 (assassinated)	1960 Inejirō Asanuma – 228; Jōtarō Kawakami – 206	Ikeda 1960–64
—		Saburō Eda (1907–1977) (acting)	Cou for Okayama at-large	12 October 1960	6 March 1961	—	Ikeda 1960–64
4		Jōtarō Kawakami (1889–1965)	Rep for Hyogo 1st	6 March 1961	6 May 1965	—	Ikeda 1960–64
4		Jōtarō Kawakami (1889–1965)	Rep for Hyogo 1st	6 March 1961	6 May 1965	—	Satō 1964–72
5		Kouzou Sasaki (1900–1985)	Rep for Miyagi 1st	6 May 1965	19 August 1967	January 1966 Kozo Sasaki – 295; Saburō Eda – 276 December 1966 Kozo Sasaki – 313; Saburō Eda – 274	Satō 1964–72
6		Seiichi Katsumata (1908–1989)	Rep for Shizuoka 2nd	19 August 1967	4 October 1968	—	Satō 1964–72
7		Tomomi Narita (1912–1979)	Rep for Kagawa 1st	30 November 1968	26 September 1977	1970 Tomomi Narita – 207; Saburō Eda – 148	Satō 1964–72
7		Tomomi Narita (1912–1979)	Rep for Kagawa 1st	30 November 1968	26 September 1977	1970 Tomomi Narita – 207; Saburō Eda – 148	Tanaka K. 1972–74
7		Tomomi Narita (1912–1979)	Rep for Kagawa 1st	30 November 1968	26 September 1977	1970 Tomomi Narita – 207; Saburō Eda – 148	Miki 1974–76
7		Tomomi Narita (1912–1979)	Rep for Kagawa 1st	30 November 1968	26 September 1977	1970 Tomomi Narita – 207; Saburō Eda – 148	Fukuda T. 1976–78
8		Ichio Asukata (1915–1990)	Rep for Tokyo 1st	13 December 1977	7 September 1983	1981 Ichio Asukata – 39379; Sanji Mutō – 14721; Shōichi Shimodaira – 3425	Fukuda T. 1976–78
8		Ichio Asukata (1915–1990)	Rep for Tokyo 1st	13 December 1977	7 September 1983	1981 Ichio Asukata – 39379; Sanji Mutō – 14721; Shōichi Shimodaira – 3425	Ōhira 1978–80
8		Ichio Asukata (1915–1990)	Rep for Tokyo 1st	13 December 1977	7 September 1983	1981 Ichio Asukata – 39379; Sanji Mutō – 14721; Shōichi Shimodaira – 3425	Ito 1980 (Acting)
8		Ichio Asukata (1915–1990)	Rep for Tokyo 1st	13 December 1977	7 September 1983	1981 Ichio Asukata – 39379; Sanji Mutō – 14721; Shōichi Shimodaira – 3425	Suzuki Z. 1980–82
8		Ichio Asukata (1915–1990)	Rep for Tokyo 1st	13 December 1977	7 September 1983	1981 Ichio Asukata – 39379; Sanji Mutō – 14721; Shōichi Shimodaira – 3425	Nakasone 1982–87
9		Masashi Ishibashi (1924–2019)	Rep for Nagasaki 2nd	7 September 1983	8 September 1986	—	Nakasone 1982–87
10		Takako Doi (1928–2014)	Rep for Hyogo 2nd	9 September 1986	31 July 1991	1986 Takako Doi – 58670; Tetsu Ueda – 11748	Nakasone 1982–87
10		Takako Doi (1928–2014)	Rep for Hyogo 2nd	9 September 1986	31 July 1991	1986 Takako Doi – 58670; Tetsu Ueda – 11748	Takeshita 1987–89
10		Takako Doi (1928–2014)	Rep for Hyogo 2nd	9 September 1986	31 July 1991	1986 Takako Doi – 58670; Tetsu Ueda – 11748	Uno 1989
10		Takako Doi (1928–2014)	Rep for Hyogo 2nd	9 September 1986	31 July 1991	1986 Takako Doi – 58670; Tetsu Ueda – 11748	Kaifu 1989–91
11		Makoto Tanabe (1922–2015)	Rep for Gunma 1st	31 July 1991	19 January 1993	1991 Makoto Tanabe – 46363; Tetsu Ueda – 36358	Kaifu 1989–91
11		Makoto Tanabe (1922–2015)	Rep for Gunma 1st	31 July 1991	19 January 1993	1991 Makoto Tanabe – 46363; Tetsu Ueda – 36358	Miyazawa 1991–93
12		Sadao Yamahana (1936–1999)	Rep for Tokyo 11th	19 January 1993	25 September 1993	—	Miyazawa 1991–93
12		Sadao Yamahana (1936–1999)	Rep for Tokyo 11th	19 January 1993	25 September 1993	—	Hosokawa 1993–94 (coalition)
13		Tomiichi Murayama (1924–2025)	Rep for Ōita 1st	25 September 1993	19 January 1996	1993 Tomiichi Murayama – 65446; Masatoshi Ito – 18075 1996 Tomiichi Murayama – 57591; Tadatoshi Akiba – 10440	Hosokawa 1993–94 (coalition)
13		Tomiichi Murayama (1924–2025)	Rep for Ōita 1st	25 September 1993	19 January 1996	1993 Tomiichi Murayama – 65446; Masatoshi Ito – 18075 1996 Tomiichi Murayama – 57591; Tadatoshi Akiba – 10440	Hata 1994
13		Tomiichi Murayama (1924–2025)	Rep for Ōita 1st	25 September 1993	19 January 1996	1993 Tomiichi Murayama – 65446; Masatoshi Ito – 18075 1996 Tomiichi Murayama – 57591; Tadatoshi Akiba – 10440	himself 1994–96
13		Tomiichi Murayama (1924–2025)	Rep for Ōita 1st	25 September 1993	19 January 1996	1993 Tomiichi Murayama – 65446; Masatoshi Ito – 18075 1996 Tomiichi Murayama – 57591; Tadatoshi Akiba – 10440	Hashimoto 1996–98 (coalition, confidence and supply)
Successor party: Social Democratic Party (centre-left to left-wing)

== Election results ==
=== General election results ===
House of Representatives
Election	Leader	Seats			Position	Constituency votes		Status
Election	Leader	No.	±	Share	Position	Number	%	Status
1946	Tetsu Katayama	92 / 468		19.6%	3rd	9,924,930	17.90%	Opposition
1947	Tetsu Katayama	143 / 466	▲51	30.7%	▲1st	7,176,882	26.23%	JSP-DP-NCP coalition (until 1948)
1947	Tetsu Katayama	143 / 466	▲51	30.7%	▲1st	7,176,882	26.23%	Opposition (since 1948)
1949	Tetsu Katayama	48 / 466	▼95	10.3%	▼3rd	4,129,794	13.50%	Opposition
1952	Jōtarō Kawakami; Mosaburō Suzuki	111 / 466	▲63	23.8%	▲2nd	7,507,842	21.24%	Opposition
1953	Jōtarō Kawakami; Mosaburō Suzuki	138 / 466	▲27	29.6%	2nd	9,194,547	26.57%	Opposition
1955	Jōtarō Kawakami; Mosaburō Suzuki	156 / 467	▲18	33.4%	2nd	10,812,905	29.21%	Opposition
1958	Mosaburō Suzuki	166 / 467	▲10	35.5%	2nd	13,093,993	32.94%	Opposition
1960	Saburō Eda	145 / 467	▼21	31.0%	2nd	10,887,134	27.56%	Opposition
1963	Jōtarō Kawakami	144 / 467	▼1	30.8%	2nd	11,906,766	29.03%	Opposition
1967	Kōzō Sasaki	140 / 486	▼4	28.8%	2nd	12,826,104	27.88%	Opposition
1969	Tomomi Narita	90 / 486	▼50	18.5%	2nd	10,074,101	21.44%	Opposition
1972	Tomomi Narita	118 / 491	▲28	24.0%	2nd	11,478,142	21.90%	Opposition
1976	Tomomi Narita	123 / 511	▲5	24.1%	2nd	11,713,009	20.69%	Opposition
1979	Ichio Asukata	107 / 511	▼16	20.9%	2nd	10,643,450	19.71%	Opposition
1980	Ichio Asukata	107 / 511	0	20.9%	2nd	11,400,748	19.31%	Opposition
1983	Masashi Ishibashi	112 / 511	▲5	21.9%	2nd	11,065,083	19.49%	Opposition
1986	Masashi Ishibashi	85 / 512	▼27	16.6%	2nd	10,412,584	17.23%	Opposition
1990	Takako Doi	136 / 512	▲51	26.6%	2nd	16,025,472	24.39%	Opposition
1993	Sadao Yamahana	70 / 511	▼66	13.7%	2nd	9,687,589	15.43%	JSP-Komeito-JRP-JNP-DSP-NPS-DRP-SDF coalition (until 1994)
1993	Sadao Yamahana	70 / 511	▼66	13.7%	2nd	9,687,589	15.43%	LDP–JSP–NPS coalition (until 1996)

=== Councillors election results ===
Election	Leader	No. of seats total	No. of seats won	No. of national votes	% of national vote	No. of prefectural votes	% of prefectural vote
Japanese Socialist Party era
1947	Tetsu Katayama	47 / 250		3,479,814	16.4%	4,901,341	23.0%
1950	Tetsu Katayama	61 / 250	36 / 125	4,854,629	17.3%	7,316,808	25.2%
1953	Mosaburō Suzuki	66 / 250	28 / 125	5,559,875	20.7%	6,870,640	24.5%
1956	Mosaburō Suzuki	80 / 250	49 / 127	8,549,940	29.9%	11,156,060	37.6%
1959	Mosaburō Suzuki	85 / 250	38 / 127	7,794,754	26.5%	10,265,394	34.1%
1962	Jōtarō Kawakami	66 / 250	37 / 127	8,666,910	24.2%	11,917,675	32.8%
1965	Kōzō Sasaki	73 / 251	36 / 127	8,729,655	23.4%	12,346,650	32.8%
1968	Tomomi Narita	65 / 250	28 / 126	8,542,199	19.8%	12,617,680	29.2%
1971	Tomomi Narita	66 / 249	39 / 125	8,494,264	21.3%	12,597,644	31.2%
1974	Tomomi Narita	62 / 250	28 / 130	7,990,457	15.2%	13,907,865	26.0%
1977	Ichio Asukata	56 / 249	27 / 126	8,805,617	17.3%	13,403,216	25.9%
1980	Ichio Asukata	47 / 250	22 / 126	7,341,828	13.1%	12,715,880	22.4%
1983	Ichio Asukata	44 / 252	22 / 126	7,590,331	16.3%	11,217,515	24.3%
1986	Takako Doi	41 / 252	20 / 126	9,869,088	17.2%	12,464,579	21.5%
1989	Takako Doi	68 / 252	45 / 126	19,688,252	35.1%	15,009,451	26.4%
1992	Takako Doi	71 / 252	22 / 126	7,981,726	17.8%	7,147,140	15.8%
1995	Tomiichi Murayama	37 / 252	16 / 126	6,882,919	16.9%	4,926,003	11.9%

== See also ==
- List of political parties in Japan
- Japan Socialist Party Platform (1945)
- Left Socialist Party Platform (Japan)
- Right Socialist Party Platform (Japan)
- Japan Socialist Party Platform (1955)
- The Road to Socialism in Japan
- New Declaration of the Japan Socialist Party
- 95 Declaration of the Japan Socialist Party
- Japanese-style social democracy
- Reunification of the Japan Socialist Party
- Class-based mass party
- Class party
- Morito–Inamura dispute
- New Japan Construction National Movement
- Three-Party Joint Declaration on Japan–North Korea Relations
- Japan Socialist Association Theses
- Japan Socialist Association

== Works cited ==
- Cole, Allan; Totten, George; Uyehara, Cecil (1966). Socialist Parties In Postwar Japan. Yale University Press.
