= Japanese-style social democracy =

Japanese political tradition combining socialism and parliamentary democracy

Japanese-style social democracy (日本型社会民主主義, Nihon-gata shakai minshushugi) is a term referring to the mainstream form of social democracy in Japan, which took a political stance different from the mainstream Western European social democracy. It primarily refers to the orientation and political posture of the Japan Socialist Party (now the Social Democratic Party). Until 1986, the Japan Socialist Party was a socialist party whose goal was to seize power through class struggle and ultimately carry out a revolution to establish a socialist government. Its 1964 party platform, known as "The Road", included the concept of the dictatorship of the proletariat and represented a leftward shift compared with the party's founding in 1945. Moreover, rather than seeking to expand its electoral support among the general public, the party relied heavily on Sōhyō (the left-wing labor federation), and it prioritized extra-parliamentary activities over increasing its parliamentary seats by defeating the Liberal Democratic Party in elections.

Separately, the domestic politics and policies of the Japanese government and the Liberal Democratic Party up to the 1990s, once praised even by the Soviet Union as "the most successful socialist state", have sometimes also been called Japanese-style socialism. This usage is unrelated to socialism or social democracy as an ideology or ideology-based political movement; it refers instead to the strong degree of government intervention in the economy (the "Liberal Democratic Party-style socialism"), exemplified by the convoy system, and to a management culture that placed less emphasis on stock dividends than in other Western countries (Japanese management culture).

== Overview ==
The Japan Socialist Party, founded in 1945, initially had a right wing that was close to Western European social democracy in a dominant position. However, after a major defeat in the 1949 general election and the subsequent Morito–Inamura dispute at the party's fourth congress, the left wing established its ascendancy. This tendency continued even after the reunification of the two socialist parties in 1955.

The left wing was strongly influenced by Marxism. Left-wing forces within the Japan Socialist Party, such as the Japan Socialist Association, belonged to the prewar Rōnōha tradition and were also in conflict with the Japanese Communist Party. This was the so-called Rōnōha Marxism. Until the 1950s the Socialist Association and similar groups kept a distance from Marxism–Leninism, but from the 1960s onward they rapidly oriented themselves toward Marxism–Leninism and openly identified as such.

The peculiarity of the Japan Socialist Party can be explained by the leading role played by Marxist forces:

- Strong antagonism and combativeness toward American imperialism and Japanese capitalist forces
- Affinity toward communist countries (socialist countries) such as the Soviet Union, China, and North Korea
- Pursuit of a socialist revolution
- Theory of a class party

At the same time, however, the party also possessed the following characteristics:

- Rejection of violent revolution and adoption of a peaceful-revolution line through parliamentary means
- De facto rejection of the so-called democratic centralism and acceptance of the existence of internal factions
- Membership in the Socialist International

Of these, the peaceful-revolution line has also been recognized as the general line of the Japanese Communist Party since the 1970s. However, the Communist Party continues to maintain democratic centralism into the 21st century (which the Socialist Party rejected), does not recognize the Socialist International, and the Socialist International itself later rejected Marxism–Leninism—points that differentiate it from the goals of the Japan Socialist Party.

These characteristics are most clearly reflected in party documents such as the Left Socialist Party platform and "The Road to Socialism in Japan", which effectively affirmed the dictatorship of the proletariat.

The Democratic Socialist Party, formed in 1960 in reaction against the left-wing character and security policies of the Japan Socialist Party, advocated Western European social democracy but remained a minority force in Japanese society and politics. It was revealed on 18 July 2006, in a collection of U.S. State Department diplomatic documents, that the CIA had provided funds to "moderate left-wing forces" and encouraged the formation of the Democratic Socialist Party.

== Criticism ==
Mao Zedong called the Japan Socialist Party "the strangest political party in the world."

Analysis that treats the Japan Socialist Party as a form of social democracy different from Western European social democracy, while evaluating that difference positively, began with Shimizu Shinzō's Japanese Social Democracy (『日本の社会民主主義』, Iwanami Shinsho, 1961). The term "Japanese-style social democracy" itself is said to have first appeared in the New Left-oriented Kishimoto Kenichi (Tōyama Kenichi)'s Japanese-style Social Democracy (『日本型社会民主主義』, Gendai Shichōsha, 1966); Kishimoto himself stated that the title was suggested by Shimizu's book.

The Japan Socialist Party itself continued to reject social democracy. Although the adoption of the "New Declaration of the Japan Socialist Party" in 1986 made it a Western European-style social democratic party in terms of its platform, the shift to a Western-style social democratic line remained incomplete. The basic policies, movement style, and organizational characteristics formed earlier continued to persist strongly within the party and have been inherited in the 21st century by the New Socialist Party and the Social Democratic Party.

Evaluations of Japanese-style social democracy include both the positive assessment represented by Shimizu Shinzō and the negative assessment by political scientists outside the party, who argue that it hindered the Socialist Party's adaptation to the new social conditions of the high-growth period and made its transformation into a governing party difficult.

The Socialist Association, from the standpoint of strengthening the Socialist Party as a socialist party, avoided evaluating the concept of Japanese-style social democracy. In the 21st century, however, opinions that positively evaluate Japanese-style social democracy have also emerged from within the Socialist Association.

Regarding the Japanese Communist Party, which originated as the Japanese branch of the Comintern (which strongly rejected "socialism through parliamentary democracy" and advocated the theory of social fascism), and which even after the war, under the direction of the Soviet and Chinese Communist parties, adopted the 1951 Program at its 4th National Conference in February 1951 and pursued a line of armed struggle and violent revolution inside Japan, the Japanese scholar of Chinese theater Seto Hiroshi has expressed the view that, after the 2004 party program raised the "majority revolution aimed at through parliament," the party has "in substance become a social democratic party."

== See also ==
- Social Democratic Party (Japan)
- Japan Socialist Party
- Japanese Communist Party
- Democratic Socialist Party (Japan)
- Left Socialist Party of Japan
- Japan Socialist Association
- Rōnōha Marxism
- Social democracy
- Democratic socialism
