= Three-Party Joint Declaration on Japan–North Korea Relations =

The Joint Declaration on Japan–North Korea Relations by the Liberal Democratic Party of Japan, the Japan Socialist Party, and the Workers' Party of Korea (Three-Party Joint Declaration) is a joint declaration announced in 1990 in Pyongyang, the capital of North Korea.

== Overview ==
From September 24 to 28, 1990, a Liberal Democratic Party delegation led by Shin Kanemaru and a Japan Socialist Party delegation led by Makoto Tanabe visited North Korea, carrying a personal letter from then-Prime Minister Toshiki Kaifu. Regarding the content of the letter, the General Association of Korean Residents in Japan stated that "President Toshiki Kaifu expressed apology and remorse for the intolerable suffering and misfortune that Japan's colonial rule inflicted on the Korean people in the past, and expressed the hope of improving relations between Japan and North Korea."

On the evening of September 26, Chairman Kim Il Sung proposed to Kanemaru during a private meeting that "we should begin negotiations for the normalization of diplomatic relations between North Korea and Japan." Based on this, the "Joint Declaration on Japan–North Korea Relations by the Liberal Democratic Party of Japan, the Japan Socialist Party, and the Workers' Party of Korea" was announced on September 28.

It was also agreed that the two Japanese nationals—Captain Isamu Beniko and Chief Engineer Yoshio Kuriura of the fishing vessel No. 18 Fujisan Maru, who had been captured by North Korea as spies in connection with the 1983 defection incident involving North Korean soldier Min Hong-gu and had served seven years in prison—would be released and allowed to return to Japan. This was subsequently carried out.

== Full text ==
During the visit, several rounds of three-party joint talks were held among the Liberal Democratic Party delegation led by House of Representatives member Shin Kanemaru, the Japan Socialist Party delegation led by Central Executive Committee Vice Chairman Makoto Tanabe, and the Workers' Party of Korea delegation led by Party Central Committee Secretary Kim Yong-sun. The full text is as follows:

The three-party delegations, recognizing that normalizing and developing relations between Japan and North Korea based on the principles of independence, peace, and friendship conforms to the interests of the peoples of both countries and contributes to peace and prosperity in a new Asia and the world, declare as follows:

1. The three parties recognize that Japan should officially apologize and make full compensation to the Democratic People's Republic of Korea for the great misfortune and suffering inflicted on the Korean people during the 36 years of Japanese colonial rule in the past, and for the losses suffered by the Korean people during the 45 years since the war. In his personal letter conveyed to Chairman Kim Il-sung, Liberal Democratic Party President Toshiki Kaifu referred to the unfortunate past that Japan had inflicted on Korea and stated: "Regarding that unfortunate past, former Prime Minister Takeshita expressed deep remorse and regret in the Diet in March of last year, and I, as Prime Minister, hold exactly the same view," thereby expressing the hope of improving relations between Japan and North Korea.

House of Representatives member Shin Kanemaru, head of the Liberal Democratic Party delegation, also expressed deep remorse and apology for Japan's past colonial rule over the Korean people. The three parties recognize that the Japanese government should make full compensation for the damage inflicted on the people of the Democratic People's Republic of Korea at the same time as establishing diplomatic relations.

2. The three parties recognize that the abnormal state of affairs existing between Japan and North Korea should be resolved and that diplomatic relations should be established as early as possible.

3. The three parties recognize that, in order to improve relations between Japan and North Korea, exchanges should be developed in various fields including politics, economy, and culture, and that for the time being it is necessary to utilize communications satellites and to open direct shipping routes between the two countries.

4. The three parties recognize that Koreans residing in Japan should not be discriminated against and that their human rights, national rights, and legal status should be respected, and that the Japanese government should legally guarantee this.

The three parties also consider it necessary for the Japanese authorities to remove the notations related to the Democratic People's Republic of Korea from Japanese passports.

5. The three parties recognize that Korea is one and that it is in the national interest of the Korean people for the North and the South to achieve peaceful reunification through dialogue.

6. The three parties recognize the need to make joint efforts to build a peaceful and free Asia and for the threat of nuclear weapons to disappear from all regions of the earth in the future.

7. The three parties agreed to strongly urge that intergovernmental negotiations for the realization of the establishment of diplomatic relations between North Korea and Japan and for the resolution of pending issues begin within November of this year.

8. The three parties agreed to strengthen relations and further develop mutual cooperation between the Liberal Democratic Party and the Workers' Party of Korea, and between the Japan Socialist Party and the Workers' Party of Korea, in accordance with the aspirations of the peoples of both countries and the interests of Asia and the world.

September 28, 1990 Pyongyang

Representing the Liberal Democratic Party Shin Kanemaru

Representing the Japan Socialist Party Makoto Tanabe

Representing the Workers' Party of Korea Kim Yong-sun

== Subsequent Japan–North Korea relations ==
In March 1997, testimony by a North Korean former agent who had defected revealed that North Korea had abducted Megumi Yokota in 1977 under the orders of Kim Jong-il. It became clear that many similar abduction victims existed throughout Japan. The families decided to publicly reveal their real names and launch a rescue campaign, leading to the formation of the Association of Families of Victims Kidnapped by North Korea (the Family Association). In April of the following year, the National Association for the Rescue of Japanese Abducted by North Korea (commonly known as "Sukuukai") was formed.

On September 17, 2002, Japanese Prime Minister Junichiro Koizumi visited Pyongyang and held the Japan–North Korea summit with National Defense Commission Chairman Kim Jong-il, resulting in the signing of the Japan–North Korea Pyongyang Declaration. This included provisions for the resolution of the North Korean abduction issue, settlement of the past from the colonial period, and the commencement of negotiations for the normalization of diplomatic relations between Japan and North Korea. (Note: The Japan–North Korea Pyongyang Declaration made no reference to the 1991 "Joint Declaration on Japan–North Korea Relations by the Liberal Democratic Party of Japan, the Japan Socialist Party, and the Workers' Party of Korea" (Three-Party Joint Declaration). On this point, Kang Sung-eun of Korea University has argued: "The North Korean government and civic movements involved in the past settlement issue also emphasize the Pyongyang Declaration but make little mention of the Three-Party Joint Declaration. However, if we aim for true improvement in Japan–North Korea relations, I believe we should reconfirm that its principles are shown in the Three-Party Joint Declaration.") Kim Jong-il officially acknowledged some of the abductions for the first time and apologized. On October 15 of the same year, some of the abduction victims (five people) returned from North Korea to Japan.
