= Left Socialist Party Platform (Japan) =

1954 platform by the Left Socialist Party

The Left Socialist Platform (左社綱領, Sasha kōryō), officially known as the Japan Socialist Party Platform, was the party platform adopted in 1954 by the Left Socialist Party (commonly called "Left Socialists" or "Left JSP") after the 1951 split of the Japan Socialist Party. Drafted primarily from a Rōnōha (Labor-Farmer faction) Marxist perspective by a Platform Committee that included advisors such as Itsurō Sakisaka, it analyzed postwar Japan as both a subordinate nation under American imperialism and an advanced monopoly-capitalist society. It therefore treated the struggles for complete national independence and socialist revolution as inseparable (one-stage revolution theory) and argued that the revolution could and should be achieved peacefully through parliamentary means rather than armed uprising. In effect for less than two years, the platform was discarded upon the Left–Right reunification of October 1955 and replaced by the compromise Unified Socialist Party Platform. Despite its brief official life, it is historically significant as the first systematic incorporation of Rōnōha Marxist theory into the platform of a Japanese party holding seats in the Diet.

== History of formulation ==
Even after the 1951 party split, the Left Socialist Party did not initially have its own formal platform. At the 10th Party Congress in January 1953, it was decided to draft one. In April 1953, the Central Executive Committee established a Platform Committee, appointing Hiroo Wada as chairman, Junzō Inamura as secretary, and 15 members including Kōdō Itō, Sōji Okada, and Shinzō Shimizu, with advisors Hyōe Serizawa, Itsurō Sakisaka, and Masao Takahashi.

Committee discussions took place from June to August 1953. The initial draft, written primarily by Junzō Inamura, was based on the Rōnōha (Labor-Farmer faction) Marxist perspective. In late September, Shinzō Shimizu submitted a counter-proposal (the so-called "Shimizu private draft") that emphasized national struggle. The Platform Committee rejected Shimizu's draft. In November, the Central Committee approved the original committee draft for publication. Although the Shimizu draft was not officially circulated for lower-level discussion, some local organizations printed and distributed it, leading to active debate alongside the official draft.

At the 12th Party Congress in January 1954, the platform was adopted after minor revisions with a vote of 300 in favor and 54 against.

== Characteristics ==
The platform argued that contemporary Japan was simultaneously a subordinate nation under American imperialism and a developed monopoly capitalism in conflict with the working class. Therefore, the struggles for national independence and socialist revolution were inseparable (one-stage revolution theory). It envisioned this revolution not through armed uprising but as a peaceful revolution achieved through parliamentary activity. These positions reflected the theoretical lineage of the Rōnōha and the Japan Socialist Association.

== Content ==
=== Part 1: Basic Platform ===
- Historical mission of the Japan Socialist Party — The purpose of the Japan Socialist Party is the realization of a socialist society. Through socialist revolution, the party will inherit political power from the capitalist class and fundamentally transform the mechanisms of domination to enable the construction of a socialist society.
- Current state of Japanese capitalism — Japan is a subordinate nation of the United States, yet it has reached an advanced stage of capitalist development dominated by monopoly finance capital. This monopoly finance capital, driven by its class interests, aligns with American monopoly capital and stands in opposition to the working class. Therefore, the working class forms the core of the struggle for complete national independence. When the working class secures national independence, it will simultaneously achieve the socialist revolution.
- Prospects for peaceful revolution — Socialist revolution does not follow a single universal pattern. In Japan, the transfer of political power will occur peacefully through parliamentary activity rather than armed uprising. Socialist revolution does not occur merely according to the wishes of the people but requires objective conditions.
- Conditions for socialist revolution — Socialist power will be established when the Japan Socialist Party secures a stable absolute majority, particularly in the national parliament, nationalizes or socializes basic industries, and reorients administrative and judicial institutions toward socialism.
- Transitional government — When objective and subjective conditions are insufficient for the immediate establishment of a socialist regime and full social transformation, it is not in principle impermissible to establish a transitional government that falls short of a full socialist regime.

=== Part 2: Policy Platform ===
- The immediate goals of the Japan Socialist Party are the achievement of peace and independence, the defense of freedom and democracy, and the protection of the livelihood of the working masses.

=== Part 3: Organizational Platform ===
- Maintenance of the party's class character and establishment of intra-party democracy — The Japan Socialist Party is a broad class-based mass party centered on the working class and including peasants, independent small business operators, intellectuals, students, and other working people. The party consists of members who consciously dedicate themselves to achieving the party's objectives.
- Scope of party organizational activity — While the party must devote full effort to electoral struggles, it must not become merely an organization for elections or for its elected representatives.
- Relations between the party and mass organizations — Party members must fight most resolutely for the organizations to which they belong, earn the trust and support of the masses, and guide the struggles of these organizations through their ideological influence.
- Joint struggle with other parties — Permanent joint struggle or united fronts with other parties are impossible. The party acts with the conviction that only its own platform is correct. Whether to engage in joint struggle with other parties is determined solely by whether it is advantageous from the standpoint of the party's own position.

== Influence ==
The Left Socialist Platform was discarded in October 1955 upon the reunification of the Left and Right Socialist Parties, it was replaced by a compromise “Unified Socialist Party Platform” and was in effect for less than two years. Nevertheless, it is historically significant because scholars from the Rōnōha and Socialist Association, including Itsurō Sakisaka, actively participated in its creation. It represented the first systematic incorporation of Rōnōha Marxist theory into the official platform of a Japanese political party holding seats in the Diet. Even after reunification, the Socialist Association occasionally reprinted and distributed the platform, as evidenced by advertisements in its journal Socialism. Sakisaka later pointed out weaknesses in the platform, particularly its insufficient treatment of united front theory and international relations.

== See also ==
- Social democracy
- Japanese-style social democracy
