= Koza school =

The Kōza school (Japanese: 講座派) was a group of Japanese Marxist historians active from the 1920s.

== History ==
It stands out at the same time from another Marxist school, called Rōnō, on the analysis of the Meiji revolution. The Kōza group sees in the Meiji regime only an evolution of absolutism, based on a still archaic semi-feudal economy, while the Rōnō group sees in it a bourgeois revolution and therefore places Japan in a dynamic comparable to this experienced by other developed countries.

== See also ==
- Two-stage theory
