= Ōuchi Hyōei =

Japanese economist (1888–1980)

- 大内 兵衛
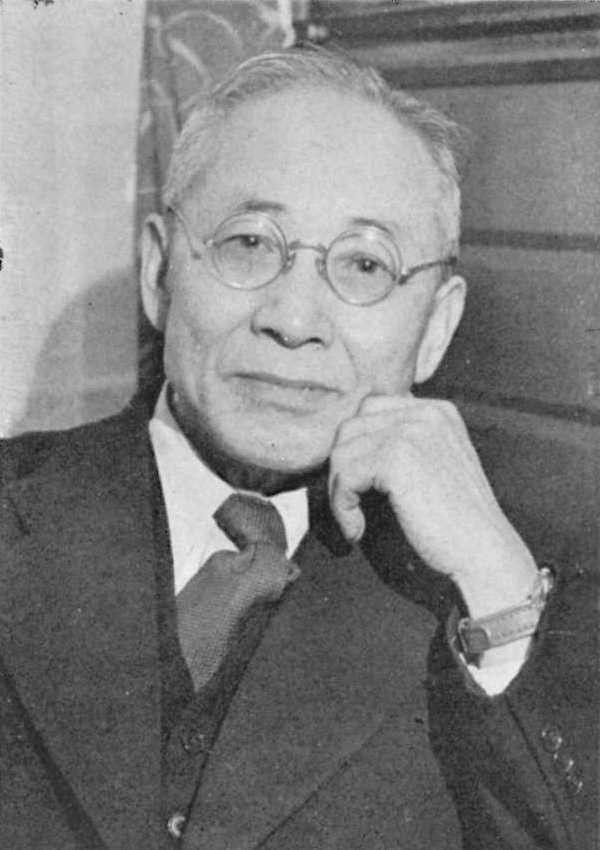
- Born: August 29, 1888; Hyogo, Japan
- Died: May 1, 1980 (aged 91)
- Education: Tokyo Imperial University
- Occupation: Economist

Ōuchi Hyōei (大内 兵衛, Ōuchi Hyōei; August 29, 1888 – May 1, 1980) was a Japanese economist.

== Early life and education ==
Ōuchi was born on August 29, 1888, in what is now Minaminawaji, Hyogo, Japan. After graduating from schools in Hyogo and Kumamoto, and earned a degree from Tokyo Imperial University.

== Career ==
Ōuchi briefly worked for the Ministry of Finance, then became a professor in the university's newly created economics department, where he was a member of a Marxist study group. Ōuchi became the editor of the department's new research journal, and published an article that Morito Tatsuo had submitted. The article was a discussion of Peter Kropotkin's theories and a criticism of Japan's political systems. The Home Ministry made them stop distributing the journal on December 27, 1919, on the grounds that Morito's article advocated for anarchism. Morito refused to apologize for writing the article, so the economics department faculty voted to suspend both Morito and Ōuchi in January 1920 and the Home Ministry took them to court. Despite protests from hundreds of university students, Ōuchi was sentenced to a year of probation. Morito was sentenced to three months in jail. During this period, Ōuchi studied abroad in Germany.

In 1923, a few years after Ōuchi returned to the university, he was promoted to full professor. However, conflict between Marxist and anti-Marxist faculty members within the department flared up after the March 15 incident. After the incident, some Marxist members of the economics department were pressured to resign. After the Popular Front Incident, Ōuchi and fellow economists Wakimura Yoshitaro, and Arisawa Hiromi were arrested in February 1939. They were suspended from teaching until the trials finished. Ōuchi was found to be innocent, and returned to the university in 1945.

During the occupation of Japan, Ōuchi was part of an early group of economic planning led by Shigeru Yoshida at the Foreign Ministry, alongside Arisawa and others. When Yoshida became Prime Minister in May 1946, he tapped Ōuchi as his Minister of Finance. However, Ōuchi refused the position, so Yoshida appointed Tanzan Ishibashi instead.

Ōuchi became the president of Hosei University in 1950. He became the president of the Japan Statistical Society in 1953. In 1959, Ōuchi left Hosei University and became president of the Japan Society of Political Economy. He was awarded the Order of the Sacred Treasure, first class, in 1965.

== Death ==
He died on May 1, 1980.
