= Morito Tatsuo =

Japanese economist (1888–1984)

- 森戸 辰男
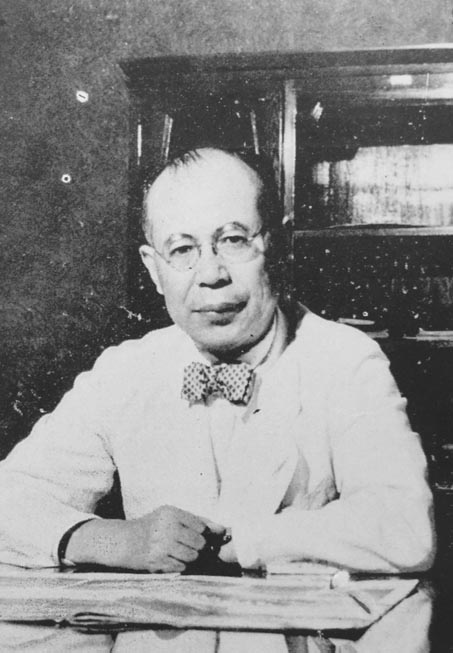

Minister of Education
- In office 1 June 1947 – 15 October 1948
- Prime Minister: Tetsu Katayama; Hitoshi Ashida
- Preceded by: Seiichirō Takahashi; Tetsu Katayama (acting)
- Succeeded by: Shigeru Yoshida (acting); Yasumaro Shimojō

Member of the House of Representatives
- In office 10 April 1946 – 18 April 1950
- Preceded by: Constituency established
- Succeeded by: Tadanori Nagayama
- Constituency: Hiroshima at-large (1946–1947); Hiroshima 3rd (1947–1950)

Personal details
- Born: 23 December 1888 Fukuyama, Hiroshima, Japan
- Died: 28 May 1984 (aged 95)
- Party: Socialist
- Education: Tokyo Imperial University

Morito Tatsuo (森戸 辰男, Morito Tatsuo; 23 December 1888 – 28 May 1984) was a Japanese economist. He served as the Minister of Education under Prime Minister Tetsu Katayama, and was the first president of Hiroshima University.

== Early life and education ==
Morito was born in what is now Fukuyama, Hiroshima, Japan on 23 December 1888. He attended First Higher School, Japan, where he was influenced by Nitobe Inazo. He then went on to study at the Tokyo Imperial University, where he studied under Takano Iwasaburo. He graduated in 1914, but became an assistant professor there in 1919.

== Career ==
=== Morito incident ===
Morito was a member of the university's newly created economics department, and was a member of a Marxist study group. Ōuchi Hyōei, another member of the study group, became the editor of the department's new research journal, and published an article that Morito had submitted. The article was a discussion of Peter Kropotkin's theories and a criticism of Japan's political systems. The Home Ministry made them stop distributing the journal on 27 December 1919, on the grounds that Morito's article advocated for anarchism. Morito refused to apologize for writing the article, so the economics department faculty voted to suspend both Morito and Ouchi in January 1920. The Home Ministry also took them to court. Despite protests from hundreds of university students, Morito was sentenced to three months in jail. Ouchi was sentenced to a year of probation. After serving his sentence, Morito followed Takano to the Ohara Institute for Social Research.

=== After the incident ===
Morito worked at the Ohara Institute until he ran for office in 1946 as a member of the Japan Socialist Party. He was elected, and served as a member of the House of Representatives. He became the Minister of Education under Tetsu Katayama in May 1947, and served in that capacity until October 1948. He became the first president of Hiroshima University from 1950 to 1963. He also served as the head of the Japan Student Services Organization and the Central Council for Education from 1963 to 1971, the head of the Japan Library Association from 1964 to 1979, and the Kokugo Shingikai. He was awarded the Order of the Sacred Treasure, first class, in 1964, the Person of Cultural Merit in 1971, and the Order of the Rising Sun in 1974.

Morito died on 28 May 1984.
