= New Socialist Party of Japan =

Socialist party in Japan

New Socialist Party of Japan 新社会党
- Chairman: Hiromi Okazaki
- Secretary-General: Hirokuni Chonan
- Founded: 3 March 1996
- Split from: Social Democratic Party
- Headquarters: 2-10 Sanshin Industry Building 3F, Jinbō-chō, Chiyoda-ku, Tokyo 101-0051, Japan
- Ideology: Socialism; Democratic socialism; Anti-capitalism; Environmentalism; Pacifism; Direct democracy
- Political position: Left-wing to far-left
- Colors: Green
- Councillors: 0 / 248
- Representatives: 0 / 465
- Prefectural assembly members: 1 / 2,598
- Municipal assembly members: 14 / 29,425

Website
- sinsyakai.or.jp

The New Socialist Party of Japan (新社会党, Shin Shakai-tō) is a socialist political party in Japan founded on 3 March 1996 by a group of politicians who left the Social Democratic Party.

The party's ideology is similar to that of the Japanese Communist Party, advocating socialism (including scientific socialism and Marxism), direct democracy, non-interventionism and pacifism. The party hopes to start a "peaceful democratic revolution", and wants to enshrine pacifism and human rights in the Constitution of Japan. The party also opposes nuclear power, saying it could be used for nuclear weaponry in the future.

== See also ==
- Leftist Socialist Party of Japan
