= Reunification of the Japan Socialist Party =

1955 reunification of the Japan Socialist Party

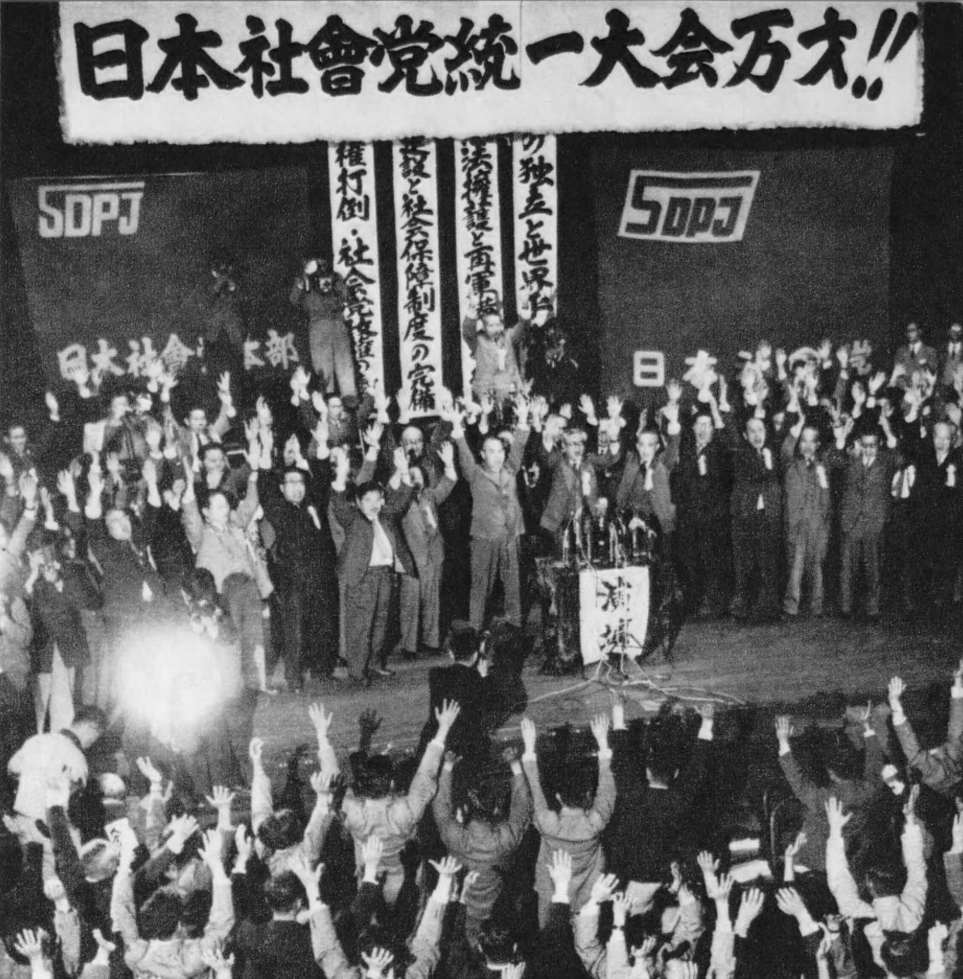
October 13, 1955

The Reunification of the Japan Socialist Party (Japanese: 社会党再統一, Shakaitō Sai Tōitsu) was the event in which the Japan Socialist Party, which had split into left and right factions, reunified at its party congress on October 13, 1955. Together with the subsequent conservative merger, it led to the formation of the 1955 System.

== Overview ==
In 1951, the Japan Socialist Party split over the San Francisco Peace Treaty into the pro-treaty Right Socialist Party of Japan and the anti-treaty Left Socialist Party of Japan. Afterwards, in order to counter the conservative government's "Reverse Course" and moves toward constitutional revision, the Left Socialist Party advocated "defense of the Constitution and opposition to the Security Treaty." It promoted opposition to the provision of bases to the U.S. military (which gradually expanded) and to rearmament, steadily increasing its seats in elections. In contrast, the Right Socialist Party, which faced internal divisions over the rearmament issue and could not present a clear position, struggled to gain seats.

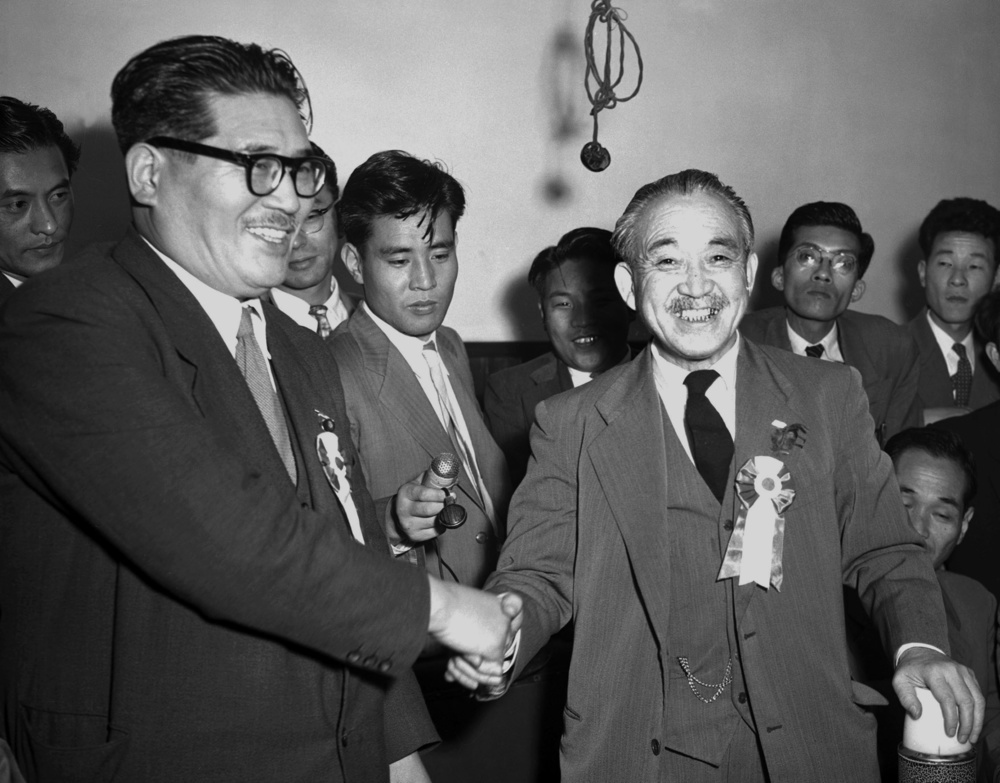
Inejirō Asanuma and Mosaburō Suzuki, October 13, 1955

As the Left gained dominance within the socialist movement and the conservative camp remained divided, both factions saw mutual benefit in reunification: a united Socialist Party would be positioned to take power. This alignment of interests led to the reunification.

On October 13, 1955, the Unified Socialist Party Congress was held. Mosaburō Suzuki of the left faction was elected chairman, while Inejirō Asanuma of the right faction became secretary-general.

The reunification created a major party holding 158 seats in the House of Representatives of Japan. In 1957, the Labourers and Farmers Party also merged into the party, temporarily resolving the split in the socialist forces that had existed since 1948.

== See also ==
- Social Democratic Party
