= Waseda University Oratorical Society =

Student debate and oratory club at Waseda University

The Waseda University Oratorical Society (Japanese: 早稲田大学雄弁会, Hepburn: Waseda Daigaku Yūbenkai; historical orthography: 早稻田大學雄辨會) is a student debate and oratory club of Waseda University, established in 1902. Because many of its alumni have become politicians or journalists, it is often regarded as a training ground for politicians. Five of its alumni have served as Prime Minister of Japan. Officially it is not a networking organisation exclusively for aspiring politicians, and many Waseda-educated politicians were never members of the society.

== History ==
- 1884 – The predecessor organisation "Dōkōkai" (同攻會) was formed amid student activism related to the Ashio Copper Mine mineral poisoning incident.
- 1902 – The Waseda University Oratorical Society was founded. University founder Shigenobu Ōkuma became its first president (sōsai). Sanae Takata served as adviser and Professor Isoo Abe as chairman.
- 1923 – The society forced the dissolution of the Waseda University Military Research Group (members including Inejirō Asanuma, Takeshi Tokano and Ryūichi Inamura were active in the campaign).
- 1929 – The society ceased to exist after the position of chairman fell vacant.
- 1945 – A Student Oratorical Society and a Debate Club were formed.
- 1946 – The Student Oratorical Society and the Debate Club merged and the Waseda University Oratorical Society was re-established.

== Achievements ==
- 1956 – Alumni member Tanzan Ishibashi became Prime Minister of Japan.
- 1987 – Alumni member Noboru Takeshita became Prime Minister of Japan.
- 1989 – Alumni member Toshiki Kaifu became Prime Minister of Japan.
- 1998 – Alumni member Keizō Obuchi became Prime Minister of Japan.
- 2000 – Alumni member Yoshirō Mori became Prime Minister of Japan.

== Notable alumni ==
=== Former Prime Ministers ===
- Tanzan Ishibashi (55th Prime Minister)
- Noboru Takeshita (74th Prime Minister)
- Toshiki Kaifu (76th and 77th Prime Minister; also a member of the Chuo University Jitatsu Gakkai)
- Keizō Obuchi (84th Prime Minister)
- Yoshirō Mori (85th and 86th Prime Minister)

=== Politicians and former Diet members active before or after the war ===
- Naoe Kinoshita (activist on the Ashio Copper Mine issue and socialist)
- Bukichi Miki (former member of the House of Representatives)
- Ikuo Ōyama (former member of the House of Representatives; former chairman of the Oratorical Society)
- Kōzō Makiyama (former member of the House of Representatives)
- Kenzō Matsumura (former member of the House of Representatives; former Minister of Agriculture and Forestry)
- Jōichi Yamamichi (former member of the House of Representatives)
- Toyokichi Tabuchi (former member of the House of Representatives)
- Masahira Hisa (former member of the House of Representatives)
- Akira Kazami (former member of the House of Representatives; former Minister of Justice)
- Junzō Sasamori (former member of the House of Representatives; former president of Aoyama Gakuin)
- Hyōgorō Sakurai (former member of the House of Representatives; former Minister of State)
- Tane’o Miyazawa (former member of the House of Representatives)
- Hiroshi Awayama (former member of the House of Representatives)
- Riichi Yamamori (former member of the House of Representatives; former mayor of Kureha Town)
- Jintarō Taketani (former member of the House of Representatives; former speaker of the Ishikawa Prefectural Assembly)
- Shinji Tagaya (former Vice-Speaker of the House of Representatives; former Secretary-General of the Japan Socialist Party)
- Naomichi Inada (former member of the House of Representatives)
- Mosaburō Suzuki (former member of the House of Representatives)
- Takejirō Nishioka (former member of the House of Representatives; former Governor of Nagasaki Prefecture)
- Kyōhei Horikawa (former member of the House of Representatives)
- Kunio Morishita (former member of the House of Representatives)
- Sannojō Nakamura (former member of the House of Representatives; former Minister of Transport)
- Enzaburō Takahashi (former member of the House of Representatives; former Minister of Agriculture and Forestry)
- Haruji Tahara (former member of the House of Representatives)
- Isamu Murakami (former member of the House of Representatives; former Minister of Posts and Telecommunications)
- Ryūichi Inamura (former member of the House of Representatives)
- Seion Kawamata (former member of the House of Representatives)
- Takeo Noda (former member of the House of Representatives; former Minister of Home Affairs)
- Rikizō Hirano (former member of the House of Representatives; former Minister of Agriculture and Forestry)
- Tokuya Furihata (former member of the House of Representatives)
- Takao Nishida (former member of the House of Representatives)
- Takashi Naitō (former member of the House of Representatives)
- Ryōto Inatomi (former member of the House of Representatives)
- Inejirō Asanuma (former member of the House of Representatives; former Chairman of the Japan Socialist Party)
- Seigō Nakano (former member of the House of Representatives; journalist)
- Ryūtarō Nagai (former Minister of Communications)
- Yasujirō Tsutsumi (former Speaker of the House of Representatives; businessman)
- Takashi Fukaya (former member of the House of Representatives; former Minister of International Trade and Industry)
- Taketora Ogata (former member of the House of Representatives; former Deputy Prime Minister)
- Hiroshi Mitsuzuka (former member of the House of Representatives; former Minister of Finance)
- Tokuichirō Tamazawa (former member of the House of Representatives; former Minister of Agriculture, Forestry and Fisheries)
- Takao Fujinami (former member of the House of Representatives; former Chief Cabinet Secretary)
- Hirohide Ishida (former member of the House of Representatives; former Minister of Transport)
- Mitsuru Matsunaga (former member of the House of Representatives; former Minister of Finance)
- Kenzō Matsumura (former member of the House of Representatives; former Minister of Education)
- Tomisaburō Hashimoto (former member of the House of Representatives; former Minister of Transport)
- Kanjirō Satō (former member of the House of Representatives)
- Kanju Satō (former member of the House of Representatives; former Minister of Home Affairs)
- Takao Saitō (former member of the House of Representatives; former President of the Administrative Management Agency)
- Shizuma Kojima (former member of the House of Councillors)
- Tadashi Senda (former member of the House of Councillors; former Governor of Iwate Prefecture)
- Shōichi Miyake (former Vice-Speaker of the House of Representatives)
- Fukujirō Kikuchi (former member of the House of Representatives)
- Kōichi Nakamura (former Vice-Speaker of the House of Representatives)
- Sanji Mutō (former member of the House of Representatives; former Chairman of the Japan Socialist Party Diet Members’ Caucus)
- Masamichi Takatsu (former Vice-Speaker of the House of Representatives)
- Sōichirō Kita (former Chairman of the House of Representatives Foreign Affairs Committee)
- Seizen Kanai (former member of the House of Councillors; former Deputy Policy Research Council Chairman of the New Conservative Party)
- Mikio Aoki (former member of the House of Councillors; former Chief Cabinet Secretary)
- Takeo Nishioka (former President of the House of Councillors)
- Kōzō Watanabe (former Vice-Speaker of the House of Representatives)
- Osamu Yoshida (former member of the House of Representatives)
- Toshiaki Koizumi (former member of the House of Representatives)
- Yoshinobu Achiwa (former member of the House of Representatives)
- Ryōji Yamada (former member of the House of Representatives)
- Hiroyuki Arai (former member of the House of Councillors; former Special Advisor to the Cabinet)
- Yūji Yamamoto (former member of the House of Representatives; former Minister of Agriculture, Forestry and Fisheries)
- Jun Azumi (former member of the House of Representatives; former Minister of Finance)
- Jin Matsubara (former member of the House of Representatives)
- Hiroshi Kawauchi (former member of the House of Representatives)
- Hideo Tezuka (former member of the House of Representatives)
- Gen Yatagawa (former member of the House of Representatives)

=== Current members of the House of Representatives ===
(Numbers in parentheses indicate the number of times elected to the House of Representatives.)

- Fukushirō Nukaga (79th and 80th Speaker of the House of Representatives; LDP member of the House of Representatives; former Minister of Finance; 14 terms)
- Takeshi Iwaya (LDP member of the House of Representatives; Minister for Foreign Affairs; Minister of Defence; 12 terms)
- Hakubun Shimomura (LDP member of the House of Representatives; Minister of Education, Culture, Sports, Science and Technology; 10 terms)
- Atsushi Ōshima (Centrist Reform Alliance member of the House of Representatives; former Parliamentary Vice-Minister for Internal Affairs and Communications; 10 terms)
- Isshū Sugawara (LDP member of the House of Representatives; former Minister of Economy, Trade and Industry; 7 terms)
- Kōnosuke Kokuba (LDP member of the House of Representatives; Chairman of the House of Representatives Foreign Affairs Committee; former Parliamentary Vice-Minister of Land, Infrastructure, Transport and Tourism; 6 terms)
- Hidetoshi Ueda (LDP member of the House of Representatives; Parliamentary Secretary for Land, Infrastructure, Transport and Tourism; 3 terms)
- Kōichi Nakagawa (LDP member of the House of Representatives; 1 term)
- Kōichirō Osada (LDP member of the House of Representatives; 1 term)

=== Current members of the House of Councillors ===
(Numbers in parentheses indicate the number of times elected to the House of Councillors.)

- Takumi Shibata (Nippon Ishin no Kai member of the House of Councillors; 3 terms)
- Hajime Hirota (Independent member of the House of Councillors; former member of the House of Representatives; former Parliamentary Vice-Minister of Defence; 4 terms)

=== Governors and local assembly members ===
- Yūji Kuroiwa (Governor of Kanagawa Prefecture; former television presenter)
- Yōichi Mizutani (Mayor of Abashiri, Hokkaido)
- Shinkai Yoshida (Mayor of Honjō, Saitama Prefecture)
- Yūto Yoshida (Mayor of Yokosuka, Kanagawa Prefecture)
- Jun’ichirō Saitō (Mayor of Yaita, Tochigi Prefecture)
- Yoshitaka Asai (Mayor of Toyohashi, Aichi Prefecture)

=== Others ===
- Hisayuki Miyake (political commentator)
- Genta Itō (NHK announcer)
- Takayuki Kasuya (Director of the News Division, Nippon Television Network)
- Kōji Kawamura (TV Asahi commentator)
- Muneo Funada (former Chief Commentator, Fuji Television)
- Osamu Sorimachi (Chief Commentator, Fuji Television News Bureau; editor-in-chief of BS Fuji LIVE Prime News)
- Akira Arai (former President of the Nihon Keizai Shimbun)
- Yasuhirō Tase (political journalist)
- Yoshimasa Miyazaki (political commentator)
- Masato Ushio (military affairs commentator)
- Norio Okazawa (political scientist)
- Kazuo Kawasaki (criminal law scholar)
- Shirō Ozaki (novelist)
- Kōji Toyoda (novelist)
- Takayuki Kamikura (entrepreneur; Representative Director and President of Imagineer Co., Ltd.)
- Jun’ichi Ushiyama (documentary filmmaker, known for works such as The Wonderful World of Travel)
- Yasunobu Fujiwara (former Waseda University professor; political scientist)
- Takehiko Yamamoto (Waseda University professor; current chairman of the society)
- Yōichi Kayashima (cram-school instructor; plaintiff in the Denshūkan trial)
- Kiyoshi Yamada (President of Tokai University)
- Hideo Matsue (Deloitte Tohmatsu Group)

== Related books ==
- Jitsuryoku seijika o haigyō suru "Sōdai Yūbenkai" no kenkyū (A Study of the Waseda Oratorical Society that Produces Capable Politicians) by Eiji Ōshita, PHP Institute, 1988. ISBN 978-4569221328
- Nagatachō no "Miyako no Seihoku" – Shōsetsu Waseda Daigaku (The "Northwest of the Capital" in Nagatachō – A Novel of Waseda University), upper and lower volumes, by Eiji Ōshita, Kadokawa Bunko
