= Right Socialist Party of Japan =

Right Socialist Party of Japan 社会党右派 Shakaitō-uha
- Chairperson: Jōtarō Kawakami
- Secretary-General: Inejirō Asanuma
- Founded: 24 October 1951
- Dissolved: 13 October 1955
- Split from: Japan Socialist Party
- Merged into: Japan Socialist Party
- Headquarters: Tokyo, Japan
- Newspaper: Shakai Shimbun
- Ideology: Anti-communism; Class collaboration; Democratic socialism; Social democracy
- Colors: Sky blue (official); Orange (customary)

The Right Socialist Party of Japan (社会党右派, Shakaitō-uha) was a more moderate faction within the Japan Socialist Party, generally favoring social democracy modeled on Western European examples rather than Soviet or Chinese-style socialism or revolution. The term also specifically denotes the separate Right Socialist Party of Japan that existed as an independent party from 1951 to 1955 after a major split in the JSP.

Following the signing of the San Francisco Peace Treaty in 1951, the Japan Socialist Party dissolved into chaos and internal bickering between moderate reformist socialists and more radical revolutionary socialists over the issue of whether or not to support the Treaty. As a result of the JSP split, some of its members formed a more centrist social democratic party, while others formed a more radical socialist party. Both groups claimed the name Nihon Shakaitō (日本社会党) but different English translations, and are known as the Left Socialist Party of Japan and the Right Socialist Party of Japan, respectively. On domestic policy, the Right Socialist Party was a centre-left social democratic party.

The left wing was in chaos between 1951 and 1955. In early 1955, the Left Socialists and the Right Socialists reconciled and merged to reform the JSP, months before the Liberal Democrat Party was created through the merger of the Liberal and Democrat parties. Even though the Right Socialist Party dissolved in 1955 when the JSP reunified, some members of the former Right Socialist Party broke off from the JSP in 1960 and created the Democratic Socialist Party. The Young Socialists, a newly formed youth organisation which retains full membership in the International Union of Socialist Youth, is said to be inherited from the political tradition of the Right Socialist Party.

== Definition and evolution ==
The definition of the "right wing" shifted over time:

- From the party's founding through the 1960s: politicians and activists from the pre-war Shakai Taishūtō and Japan Labour-Farmer Party lineages.
- After the structural reform debate: supporters of structural reform theory, mainly the Saburō Eda faction, Hiroo Wada faction, and Jōtarō Kawakami faction.
- After the Murayama cabinet: anti-Murayama group members such as Wataru Kubo, who were more open to cooperation with other non-LDP parties and liberal-democratic forces.

The core divide with the left wing concerned attitudes toward postwar democracy: whether to accept it and pursue gradual parliamentary social change, or to seek more radical transformation.

== History ==
=== Prewar period ===
As the roots of the proletarian parties that later merged into the JSP, there existed the urban labor-based Shakai Taishūtō (right wing, modeled on the British Labour Party), the agrarian and poverty-relief activist Japan Labour-Farmer Party (centrist), and the Marxist Labour-Farmer Party (left wing). In the search for a single proletarian party, the Shakai Taishūtō was formed. In 1940, those mainly from the Japan Labour-Farmer Party lineage promoted merger into Prime Minister Konoe’s New Order Movement and the Imperial Rule Assistance Association, leading to the dissolution of the Social Masses Party.

=== From founding to the left-right split ===
The Japan Socialist Party was founded in September 1945, centered on the Shakai Taishūtō faction that had kept distance from the wartime collaborationist system, incorporating the Japan Labour-Farmer Party and Labour-Farmer Party factions. Due to the subsequent public office purge, most Japan Labour-Farmer Party politicians were removed from politics. In the 1947 general election, the JSP became the largest party and the Katayama cabinet was formed. Party and government operations were centered on the Shakai Taishūtō (Nishio faction) figures such as Prime Minister Tetsu Katayama and Chief Cabinet Secretary Suehiro Nishio.

The party’s original programmatic document was the three-point Japan Socialist Party Platform adopted at the founding congress on 2 November 1945, which affirmed democracy, the rejection of capitalism in favour of socialism, and opposition to militarism in pursuit of permanent peace.

Katayama and the subsequent Ashida cabinets saw conflicts, such as the clash between Nishio Suehiro and Rikizō Hirano over the handling of the public office purge. Scandals such as the Nishio donation affair and the Shōwa Denkō scandal (both later resulting in Nishio’s acquittal) created a dirty image, rapidly eroding support inside and outside the party.

Meanwhile, many labor unions under strong Japanese Communist Party influence in the immediate postwar period shifted toward more realistic democratization movements (Mindo), strengthening the left wing’s base within the party.

==== Main politicians of this period ====
- Tetsu Katayama — First chairman. Took a Christian socialist position. Former Prime Minister. Opposed rearmament and defended the Constitution.
- Suehiro Nishio — Secretary-General during the Katayama era. In the 1942 "Yokusan election," he appealed to "shed blood for the country" but ran without recommendation and continued opposing Yokusan politics. In 1960, he supported the Japan-U.S. Security Treaty and formed the Democratic Socialist Party (predecessor of the DSP), serving as its first chairman.
- Komakichi Matsuoka — Former president of the Japan Labor Federation and All-Japan Labor Federation. Entered politics postwar and served as Speaker of the House of Representatives.
- Chōsaburō Mizutani
- Morito Tatsuo
- Rikizō Hirano — Active in the prewar agrarian movement; known for unique activities including temporary cooperation with the Reservists Association. Served as Agriculture Minister in the Katayama cabinet but was dismissed over purge handling. This led the Hirano group to leave the JSP and form the Social Reform Party.
- Zenkō Suzuki — Moved from the Social Reform Party to the Democratic Liberal Party; later became LDP president and Prime Minister.
- Shizue Yamaguchi — Contributed to the passage of the Prostitution Prevention Law. Joined the LDP in 1967.
- Shidzue Katō — Wife of Kanjū Katō. Contributed to the Eugenics Protection Law. Later left the party, turned conservative, supported the New Party Sakigake and New Frontier Party. Served as honorary president of a political school for women.

=== Right Socialist Party (1951–1955) ===
Members of the Right Socialist Party celebrating the results of the 25th House of Representatives general election held on 1 October 1952.

Following the collapse of the Katayama and Ashida cabinets and disputes over their evaluation, the JSP underwent multiple splits. In 1951, it divided over support for the San Francisco Peace Treaty and the (old) Japan-U.S. Security Treaty. The group favoring the Peace Treaty and opposing the Security Treaty was conveniently called the "Right Socialist Party" (abbreviated "Right Socialist"). Both sides claimed the name "Japan Socialist Party."

Initially, the chairmanship was left vacant, with Inejirō Asanuma serving as Secretary-General. Later, Jōtarō Kawakami, whose purge had been lifted, became chairman. During this chaotic period, the JSP’s security policy, while breaking with militarism, began to center on anti-rearmament.

With the end of the public office purge, Japan Labour-Farmer Party lineage (Kawakami faction) politicians returned to politics from the 1952 election and joined the Right Socialist Party. However, party organization was weak, and elections relied on prominent local politicians' personal support networks. In contrast, the Left Socialist Party built strong organizational campaigns based on labor unions that had broken from Communist Party guidance. The Right was thus sometimes called "the right with faces."

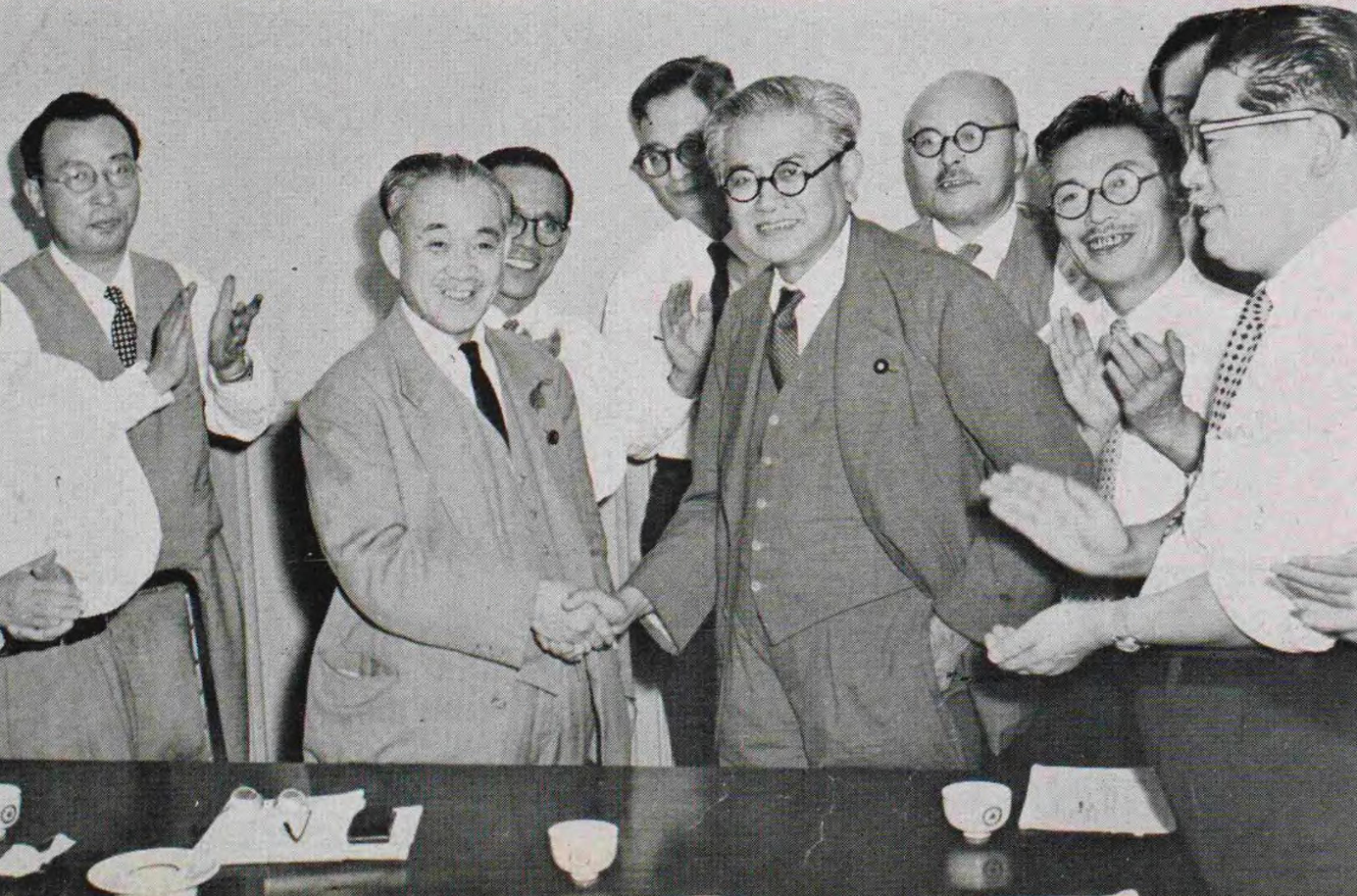
On 1 October 1950, the Left Socialist Party and the Right Socialist Party held their first joint expanded committee meeting. Mosaburō Suzuki and Jōtarō Kawakami are shown shaking hands, with Right Socialist Party Secretary-General Inejirō Asanuma standing on the right.

The Right Socialist Party started with 29 seats, rising to 57 in the 1952 election, 66 in 1953, and 67 in 1955. On 13 October 1955, through the efforts of the Kawakami and Suzuki factions, the Left and Right Socialist Parties reunified. Right Socialist chairman Kawakami became a JSP advisor, and Asanuma became Secretary-General of the unified party.

In May 1955, as reunification talks advanced, the Right Socialist Party’s Central Executive Committee adopted the Right Socialist Platform (右社綱領, also known as the Unified Socialist Party Platform Draft). This document articulated the party’s democratic-socialist principles, including peaceful parliamentary revolution, rejection of both communism and fascism, and a broad mass-party character. It served as the Right’s formal proposal for the platform of the reunified party. At the October unification congress a compromise document, the Unified Socialist Party Platform, was adopted as the official platform of the reunified Japan Socialist Party.

==== Main politicians of this period (in addition to the earlier Nishio faction) ====
- Jōtarō Kawakami — Began poverty-relief activities in Kobe from a Christian socialist standpoint. Central figure in the Japan Labour-Farmer Party. Acknowledged his own war responsibility and devoted himself to the peace movement.
- Inejirō Asanuma — Started from the Waseda University Kensetsusha Dōmei (Builders League) student movement. In the Japan Labour-Farmer Party, he respected Hisashi Asō, who had most strongly promoted the New Order Movement; after the war, Asanuma's sense of guilt and desire to atone for his involvement with that movement influenced his political conduct. Valued organization and worked to maintain and build networks, contributing greatly to postwar JSP reconstruction.
- Jusō Miwa
- Mitsu Kōno
- Kasuga Ikkō — Later became the third chairman of the Democratic Socialist Party.
- Michio Asanuma — Distant relative of Inejirō. Turned to the right wing and later served as advisor to the Greater Japan Patriotic Party, among others.

=== After the Structural Reform Debate ===
In 1959, the Nishio expulsion issue arose, leading to the departure of the Nishio faction and roughly half of the Kawakami faction from the JSP to form the Democratic Socialist Party. The remaining old right wing consisted of the surviving Kawakami faction.

Thereafter, structural reform theory, originating from the realistic Italian Communist Party's view of revolution as continuous reform, began to be studied in Japan and influenced JSP and JCP staff. In the JCP it was suppressed, but in the JSP, where the left wing's theory was one-stage revolution, structural reform theory was accepted as a way to reconcile revolutionary theory with parliamentary democracy by positioning daily reforms as revolutionary.

Structural reform theory was officially adopted by the party shortly after the 1960 assassination of Asanuma. The largest faction, the Socialist Research Association (Sasaki faction) to which Eda belonged, opposed it, leading Eda to break with the Sasaki faction. From then on, the Eda, Wada, and Kawakami factions promoting structural reform were called the right wing.

After the JSP’s major defeat in the 1969 general election, Eda sought to achieve a non-LDP government through cooperation with the Kōmeitō and DSP. However, the majority of the Wada faction’s successor (Seiichi Katsumata faction) shifted leftward. Plans for a new party by the Eda faction, Kōmeitō, and DSP emerged but stalled due to the party’s leftward tilt, especially the growth of the far-left Socialist Association faction.

At the 1977 JSP congress, the Socialist Association faction moved to expel Eda, who then left the party and died shortly afterward. Backlash against the Socialist Association strengthened the right wing's ranks. Thereafter, the goal became achieving power through the JSP–Kōmeitō–DSP alliance that Eda had advocated.

The right wing tended to prioritize realistic power acquisition over ideology and ideals, and de facto accepted the existence of the Self-Defense Forces. However, with the exception of some figures like Saburō Eda, there was a lack of politicians capable of presenting a concrete vision for a new government, which proved a significant obstacle to organizational growth. Their stance on diplomacy and security led some to describe the right wing as having a "halfway image—neither conservative nor innovative."

==== Main politicians of this period ====
- Saburō Eda — Prewar local assembly member; strongly anti-war within the Shakai Taishūtō. Opposed JSP–JCP cooperation and advocated the Shakōmin route, leading to his departure along with aides such as Ōshiba Shigeo. Formed the Social Citizens League with Ichikawa Fusae of the Japan Women's Voters League and rising star of the citizen-movement Kan Naoto. Died suddenly just before a planned House of Councillors run. His son Satsuki Eda resigned as a judge to run in his place and won. The following year, Eda allies such as Shōgo Abe (right wing), along with Hideo Den, Yanosuke Narasaki, Yutaka Hata and others from the New Current Group, left the JSP and joined, forming the Socialist Democratic Federation.
- Kiyomasa Katō — From the All-Japan Prefectural and Municipal Workers Union and Tokyo Metropolitan Assembly. Clashed with Ichio Asukata and left the party. Later joined the LDP and became Chiyoda Ward mayor.
- Makoto Tanabe — Central right-wing figure after Eda's departure. Became JSP chairman for the first time in 26 years from the right wing (since Kawakami). Maintained close ties with Shin Kanemaru, cooperated with the LDP while also promoting ties with centrist parties. However, could not restrain the left wing's hardline stance during the PKO bill vote.
- Yawara Hata — Former Saitama Governor. Declined re-election in 1992 and effectively handed over to LDP's Yoshihiko Tsuchiya (later House of Councillors President). Pursued pragmatic "new realism" prefectural administration ("no conservatism or innovation in local autonomy"), earning strong support and serving five terms for 20 years.
- Takahiro Yokomichi — Former Hokkaido Governor. Elected with support from many radical groups expecting opposition to nuclear fuel facilities, but approved their construction under the guise of realistic response. Actively joined the Democratic Party and reached agreement with Ichirō Ozawa on JSDF overseas dispatch.
- Hideo Den — Former newscaster from the New Current Group. PDM (Peace and Democracy Movement) caller. Became representative of the Social Democratic Federation. After the Hosokawa cabinet, co-founded the New Party Constitutional Liberals with Masao Kunihiro and others. Passed through the Peace Citizens group and joined the Social Democratic Party.
- Tetsu Ueda — From the NHK labor union, belonged to the intermediate-right "Tuesday Club." Opposed the Socialist Association while active as a constitutional defense proponent. Ran for JSP chairmanship against Tanabe and Takako Doi. After losing in 1993, left the party and engaged in various groups including the Constitution-Protecting New Party Akatsuki, Sports and Peace Party, Socialist Party (2000), and Old People's Party Tokyo, running in numerous elections.
- Ryōichi Yasutsune — Former secretary-general of the Japan Private Railway Workers’ Union Federation, standing executive of the Japan Council Against Atomic and Hydrogen Bombs (Gensuikin), vice-chair of Sōhyō. Later lost position due to the Tokyo Sagawa Express scandal.
- Takuzo Ueda — From the Soviet-line Japan Communist Party (Japanese Voice). Buraku Liberation League activist and KGB spy. Involved in the Recruit scandal. Later founded the business group Tigre.
- Yoshio Chiba — First elected in 1967 and served one term, then lost and left the party. Moved to the right-wing group "Taikosha Political Federation."

=== After the Murayama Cabinet ===
By the time the Murayama cabinet was formed, the Soviet Union had collapsed and even former left-wing politicians who had praised Soviet-style socialism had adopted moderate social-democratic thinking, so there were few sharp ideological divides within the party. The media conveniently labeled as "right wing" those politicians who prioritized defeating the LDP, even through cooperation with Ichirō Ozawa, and were prepared to form new democratic or liberal parties.

After the formation of the Democratic Party of Japan, many moved to the DPJ. As of 2018, many Diet members inheriting the old JSP right-wing lineage belonged to the Constitutional Democratic Party of Japan (2017), though some were in other parties such as the Democratic Party for the People.

In May 1995, shortly before its transformation into the Social Democratic Party, the Japan Socialist Party adopted the 95 Declaration (95 Declaration – New Basic Values and Policy Goals), which set out basic values of justice, coexistence, peace and creativity and medium-term policy goals for a post-Cold War “mature society.”

==== Main politicians of this period ====
- Wataru Kubo — Secretary-General during the Murayama administration. Personally opposed the LDP–JSP–Sakigake coalition but supported Murayama in his official capacity. Explored formation of a new democratic-liberal party and joined the Democratic Reform Party.
- Sadao Yamahana — From a left-wing family background, but after becoming chairman worked with LDP anti-mainstream factions to achieve a change of government, gradually coming to be seen as a right-wing representative. As leader of the intra-party anti-Murayama group, he submitted resignation letters for anti-Murayama Diet members, but the collective resignation tactic was suspended due to the Great Hanshin-Awaji Earthquake; he took responsibility by resigning alone.
- Tadashi Kobayashi — From the Japan Teachers' Union. Turned conservative; after leaving the party, active in the Japan Renewal Party, New Frontier Party, and Liberal Party. Later served as chairman of the Japanese Society for History Textbook Reform and supporter of the Textbook Improvement Association.
- Takashi Tanihata — Former secretary to Takuzo Ueda, former vice-chairman of the Osaka Buraku Liberation League prefectural federation. Later joined the LDP (Seiwa Seisaku Kenkyūkai). Then moved through the Japan Restoration Party (2012–2014), Japan Innovation Party, Osaka Restoration Party, and currently belongs to the Japan Innovation Party.
- Kazunari Inoue — From mayor of Settsu to Diet member; served as JSP vice-chairman and Postal Services Minister. Later passed through the Democratic Party, Liberal Party, and New Conservative Party before joining the LDP. His younger brother Shinya Inoue was active in the Salaryman New Party.

== Election results ==
=== House of Representatives ===
Election	Leader	Votes	%	Seats	+/–	Position	Status
1952	Jōtarō Kawakami	4,108,274	11.63	57 / 466	new	3rd	Opposition
1953	Jōtarō Kawakami	4,677,833	13.52	66 / 466	▲9	4th	Opposition
1955	Jōtarō Kawakami	5,129,594	13.86	67 / 467	▲1	4th	Opposition

=== House of Councillors ===
Election	Leader	Constituency			Party list			Seats		Position	Status
Election	Leader	Votes	%	Seats	Votes	%	Seats	Won	Total	Position	Status
1953	Jōtarō Kawakami	2,952,803	10.54	7 / 75	1,740,423	6.44	3 / 53	10 / 128	26 / 250	4th	Opposition

== See also ==
- 95 Declaration of the Japan Socialist Party
- Democratic Socialist Party (Japan)
- Japan Socialist Party Platform (1945)
- List of political parties in Japan
- Politics of Japan
- Right Socialist Party Platform (Japan)
- Unified Socialist Party Platform
- Socialist Democratic Federation (Japan)
- Social Democratic Party (Japan)
