= Japan Socialist Party Platform (1945) =

Founding platform of the Japan Socialist Party (1945)

The Japan Socialist Party Platform (日本社会党綱領－結党時, Nihon Shakaitō Kōryō – Kettō-ji), also known as the founding platform or the 1945 platform of the Japan Socialist Party, was the official party platform adopted at the founding congress of the Japan Socialist Party (JSP) on 2 November 1945 at Hibiya Public Hall in Tokyo. It was accompanied by a set of “General Policies” decided at the same congress.

The deliberately brief three-point platform affirmed the party’s commitment to democracy, socialism, and permanent peace/anti-militarism, while the more detailed General Policies outlined immediate postwar demands on land reform, labour rights, nationalisation of key industries, women’s equality, and demilitarisation. Together they formed the initial programmatic basis of the newly unified non-communist socialist forces in occupied Japan. The platform remained the party’s formal statement of principles until later documents (the 1955 Unified Platform, “The Road to Socialism in Japan,” the 1986 New Declaration, etc.) superseded it.

== Background and adoption ==
In the immediate aftermath of Japan’s surrender in August 1945, pre-war non-communist proletarian party leaders, trade-unionists and social-movement activists began organising a new socialist party. On 22 September 1945, Abe Isoo, Takano Iwasaburō and Kagawa Toyohiko convened a preparatory meeting. A preparatory committee was formed, and on 15 October 1945 it settled the party name, platform draft and other documents.

The founding congress opened at 10 a.m. on 2 November 1945 at Hibiya Public Hall with more than a thousand delegates present. After reports on the preparatory work, the congress adopted the party name, the three-point platform, the general policies, party rules, and several emergency policy resolutions (food, land reform, inflation, unemployment, housing, electoral reform, repatriation, and war responsibility). Tetsu Katayama was elected secretary-general; the chairmanship was left vacant.

The official Japanese text of the platform and general policies is preserved in the party’s own documentary collection Nihon Shakaitō Kōryō Bunken-shū (日本社会党綱領文献集, Central Headquarters Organ Bureau, first printing 20 November 1978) and in the commemorative volume Shiryō Nihon Shakaitō Yonjūnen-shi (資料日本社会党四十年史, 1986).

== Content of the platform ==
The platform consists of three short articles:

1. Our Party, as a united body of the working strata, shall secure the political freedom of the people and thereby establish a democratic system.
2. Our Party shall reject capitalism, carry out socialism, and thereby secure the stability and improvement of the people’s livelihood.
3. Our Party shall oppose all militarist thought and action and aim at the realisation of permanent peace through the cooperation of the peoples of the world.

== General Policies ==
Adopted together with the platform, the General Policies set out concrete immediate demands under nine headings (Politics, Diplomacy, Finance, Economy, Labour, Agriculture, Society, Women, Culture). Key points include:

- Politics: democratisation of the Constitution on the basis of the people’s will; investigation of the causes and responsibility for the war; abolition of the Privy Council and the senior statesmen system; a bicameral system of regional and functional representation; responsible cabinet system; large-constituency proportional representation and suffrage for men and women aged 18 and over; fundamental reform of the administrative and judicial systems; democratisation of local autonomy with popular election of governors and mayors; abolition of the family system; eradication of militarism, fascism and bureaucracy.
- Diplomacy: end of secret diplomacy and development of people’s diplomacy; fulfilment of international obligations under the Potsdam Declaration; participation in international security and labour organisations; cooperation with socialist parties and proletarian organisations worldwide; world disarmament and permanent peace free from oppression and exploitation.
- Finance: confiscation of wartime profits; termination of government guarantees to munitions companies and investigation of their assets; termination of extraordinary military expenditure; prevention of malignant inflation at the expense of the propertied classes; introduction of a property tax and steeply progressive income and inheritance taxes; abolition of the old pension system and creation of a national pension system; opposition to disposal of state property under the pretext of debt consolidation.
- Economy: realisation of a socialist planned economy and abolition of military-bureaucratic controls; establishment of a Supreme Economic Council; nationalisation of key industries (iron and steel, coal, chemical fertiliser, electricity, etc.), banking, trust and insurance; democratisation of state enterprises (railways, posts, telegraph, telephone, monopolies); promotion of peace industries, cooperative organisation of medium and small industry, and consumer cooperatives; increase and improvement of staple-food distribution.
- Labour: establishment of a Ministry of Labour; legal recognition of trade unions, enactment of a collective-agreement law and revision of the dispute-mediation law; worker participation in industrial management; minimum-wage system; 48-hour working week; unemployment measures aimed at full employment.
- Agriculture: fundamental reform of the land system, rational distribution of farmland and thorough reduction of tenant rents; large-scale reclamation; mechanisation and encouragement of livestock farming; agricultural insurance; state management of fertiliser and feed; democratisation of agricultural and fishery organisations; thorough cooperative organisation based on cultivators.
- Society: establishment of Ministries of National Land Construction and Social Insurance; national land planning and rapid reconstruction of war-damaged areas; comprehensive social-insurance system covering unemployment, old age, education, etc.; improved relief for war wounded and bereaved families; priority employment, collective resettlement and vocational training for demobilised soldiers; state responsibility for housing; democratisation and expansion of broadcasting.
- Women: abolition of all customs, institutions and laws that restrict women on the basis of equality of the sexes; equal opportunity in education and employment and elimination of discrimination in status and treatment; thorough political education of women; prohibition of trafficking in women; improvement and expansion of facilities for infants and children.
- Culture: free absorption of world culture and construction of a new national culture; promotion of the spirit of social solidarity based on the dignity of the person; combination of labour and education and dissemination of socialist knowledge; raising of scientific and technical standards; adoption of the metric system; extension of compulsory education and fundamental reform of the educational system; state support for talented students without means; elimination of state interference in religion; respect for art and guarantee of its freedom; popularisation of sport; adoption of Esperanto as an international language.

== Characteristics and historical significance ==
The 1945 platform is deliberately brief and high-level, reflecting the broad coalition character of the new party (which brought together pre-war Social Democratic Party, Japan Labour-Farmer Party and Japan Proletarian Party currents). It affirms three core principles that would remain central to JSP identity for decades: democracy, socialism and peace/anti-militarism. The accompanying general policies are more concrete and reveal the immediate post-surrender priorities of land reform, labour rights, nationalisation of key industries, women’s equality, and demilitarisation under the occupation.

Later party documents (the 1955 Unified Platform, “The Road to Socialism in Japan” of 1964–66, the 1986 New Declaration) explicitly treated the founding platform as a historical document while claiming continuity with its democratic-socialist and pacifist orientation.

== See also ==
- Japan Socialist Party
- Japan Socialist Party Platform (1955)
- Left Socialist Party Platform (Japan)
- Right Socialist Party Platform (Japan)
- The Road to Socialism in Japan
- New Declaration of the Japan Socialist Party
- 95 Declaration of the Japan Socialist Party
