= Junzō Inamura =

Japanese politician (1900–1955)

- 稲村 順三
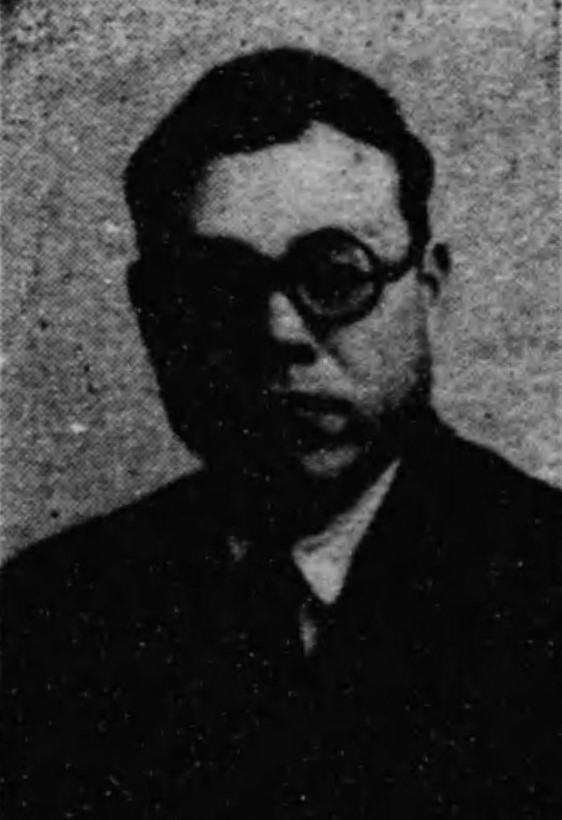

Member of the House of Representatives
- In office April 11, 1946 – January 24, 1955
- Constituency: Niigata 2nd → Niigata 3rd

Personal details
- Born: September 30, 1900 Sanjō, Niigata Prefecture, Japan
- Died: February 21, 1955 (aged 54)
- Party: Labour-Farmer Party → Japan Socialist Party → Left Socialist Party
- Relatives: Brother: Ryūichi Inamura (former House of Representatives member); Son: Toshio Inamura (former House of Councillors member)

Junzō Inamura (稲村 順三, Inamura Junzō, 30 September 1900 – 21 February 1955) was a Japanese peasant movement activist and politician who served five terms in the House of Representatives. Active in the prewar proletarian and agrarian movements, he later became a leading figure in the left wing of the Japan Socialist Party and the Left Socialist Party of Japan, helping draft its platform. He died suddenly during the 1955 general election campaign; his elder brother Ryūichi Inamura ran as a replacement candidate and was elected. He used the pen name Susumu Murakami (村上 進).

== Biography ==
Inamura was born in Sanjō, Niigata as the second son of Dōsaburō Inamura. He entered the preparatory course of Hokkaido Imperial University and later transferred to Tokyo Imperial University, but dropped out due to his involvement in the farmers' movement under the influence of his elder brother Ryūichi Inamura.

In 1926, he joined the Labour-Farmer Party and worked as an editor of the magazine Marxism. He later served as secretary of the Proletarian Masses Party and the Shakai Taishūtō. In 1927, he became a contributor to the journal Rōnō (Labour-Farmer).

In 1928, he joined the Japan Masses Party, but was expelled on May 21, 1929, along with ten others.

In 1932, he participated in farmers' movements in Akita Prefecture and Niigata Prefecture. In 1937, he was arrested during the Popular Front Incident; after his release, he worked at the Imperial Agricultural Association and as deputy secretary-general of the Central Agricultural Association.

After World War II, Inamura joined the Japan Socialist Party. In the 1946 general election, he ran from his home prefecture of Niigata and was elected to the House of Representatives, serving five terms. In 1949, he submitted a policy proposal that characterized the party as a "class party," sparking a debate with Morito Tatsuo (known as the Morito–Inamura dispute).

In 1951, he helped found the Socialist Association. When the Japan Socialist Party split into left and right factions, he worked with Itsurō Sakisaka and Kōdō Itō on drafting the platform for the Left Socialist Party and served as its organization director. In 1953, he was chairman of the platform drafting committee at the Left Socialist Party congress. He also held positions such as party farmers' department head, Central Executive Committee member, and chairman of the House of Representatives Cabinet Committee.

During the 1955 general election campaign, Inamura died suddenly on February 21, 1955, at the age of 54, just six days before election day. His elder brother Ryūichi ran as a supplementary candidate and was elected, serving four terms.

His eldest son, Toshio Inamura, later served as mayor of Sanjō and as a member of the House of Councillors for the Japan Socialist Party.

== Works ==
- Tenkanki no shokuryō mondai (Food Problems in a Period of Transition), Toyo Keizai Shinposha, 1940.
- Nōmin undō ron (Theory of the Farmers' Movement; co-authored with Ōmori Shin'ichirō and Okada Sōji), Sangensha, 1949.

He also produced numerous translations related to communism.
