= 95 Declaration of the Japan Socialist Party =

1995 programmatic declaration of the Japan Socialist Party

The 95 Declaration (Japanese: ９５年宣言, romanized: Kyūjūgo-nen Sengen), fully titled 95 Declaration – New Basic Values and Policy Goals (Japanese: ９５年宣言－－新しい基本価値と政策目標), was a programmatic declaration adopted by the Japan Socialist Party (JSP) at its 62nd Extraordinary National Congress on 27 May 1995. It set out the party’s basic values and medium-term policy goals in the post-Cold War era and the aftermath of the collapse of the 1955 System.

Formulated in response to the end of the Cold War, the breakdown of the 1955 System, and changes in citizens’ political consciousness, the declaration was intended as a contribution to a prospective “democratic-liberal new party” formed by various political forces, to be further developed through discussion among its participants. It superseded the earlier New Declaration of the Japan Socialist Party (1986) as the party’s basic programmatic text. The document defined social democracy as an unending movement of reform for freedom and democracy, with four core basic values, justice (fairness), coexistence (symbiosis), peace, and creativity, and aimed at building a balanced “mature society” characterized by quality of life, individuality, social justice, expanded participation, self-determination, and a circular economy in harmony with nature. It was adopted in the final phase of the Japan Socialist Party, shortly before the party’s transformation into the Social Democratic Party in 1996, and represented an attempt to redefine the party’s identity for a post-Cold War era.

== History of adoption ==
The declaration was adopted at the 62nd Extraordinary National Congress of the Japan Socialist Party on 27 May 1995. It was formulated in response to the end of the Cold War, the collapse of the 1955 System, and changes in citizens’ political consciousness. The text states that it was intended to be presented to a prospective “democratic-liberal new party” formed by various political forces, and that it would be further deepened and developed through discussion among those who participated in that new party.

A draft version (「95年宣言（草案）」 / “95 Declaration (Draft)”) prepared by the party’s drafting committee was published in January 1995.

The primary published source is the July 1995 issue (No. 481) of the party organ Gekkan Shakaitō (月刊社会党).

== Characteristics ==
The 95 Declaration marks a further shift in the Japan Socialist Party’s orientation toward contemporary social democracy and civic liberalism. Key features include:

- Explicit embrace of social democracy as an unending movement of reform for freedom and democracy.
- Core basic values defined as justice (fairness), coexistence (symbiosis), peace, and creativity.
- Goal of building a “mature society” characterized by quality of life, individuality, social justice, expanded participation, self-determination, and a circular economy in harmony with nature.
- Strong emphasis on the Constitution of Japan as a concrete guide and on constructing Japan as a “new model country of peace.”
- Policy orientation toward international coordination, disarmament, decentralization, gender equality, environmental sustainability, and consumer-centered market economy.
- Positioning of the party (and any successor new party) as a tolerant civic party open to working people, people with diverse values, and younger generations, rather than a narrow nationalist organization.

== Content ==
The declaration is structured in four main parts.

=== 1. Introduction ===
The introduction situates the document in the historical turning point at the end of the 20th century. It declares the party’s resolve to share the post-Cold War era with people around the world and to move toward the 21st century. It presents the declaration as a contribution to a prospective democratic-liberal new party that would be supported by working people, citizens with diverse values, and younger generations. The role of such a new party is defined as coordinating citizens’ demands for meaning in life, spiritual fulfillment, and a more comfortable existence into future-oriented policies and realizing them through government.

=== 2. Basic values ===
Social democracy is defined as an unending movement and ideology of reform for the realization of freedom and democracy in all fields of society. Its basic values are:

- Justice (fairness): equality of rights and opportunities; human dignity as the highest value.
- Coexistence (symbiosis): solidarity across differences of sex, nationality, language, religion, and ethnicity, and living together with the natural environment.
- Peace: permanent elimination of the fear, poverty, and hatred that cause war, and the preservation of safety and survival.
- Creativity: intelligent activity, grounded in humanism, that transforms society into a more livable place.

=== 3. New social goal ===
The new social goal is a balanced “mature society.” This society pursues individuality, quality of life, spiritual fulfillment, social justice, expanded participation, and self-determination; it is a circular society in which natural resources are regenerated and reused and in which nature and human civilization can coexist. Diverse arts, culture, and sports are encouraged; rich choices are available at every life stage (education, work, old age); and women and men, people with and without disabilities, and people of different nationalities, languages, and religions support one another. The Constitution of Japan is to be given concrete form in many ways, and Japan is to seek a “culture of living together” with people throughout the world by becoming a model country of peace.

=== 4. Policy goals ===
Under the basic values and social goal, the declaration sets medium-term policy goals in the following areas (to be revised as political, social, and economic conditions and people’s life consciousness change):

- Diplomacy and defense: reflection on past wars and clear assumption of responsibility; aim to become a country trusted by Asia and the world; no nuclear armament and no military great-power status; recognition of the Self-Defense Forces as constitutional, with the exercise of the right of self-defense limited to territory, territorial waters, and airspace, and planned reduction and reorganization of the SDF; pursuit of universal collective security centered on the United Nations; maintenance of the Japan–U.S. Security Treaty while minimizing its military aspect and expanding political and economic cooperation; emphasis on relations with Asian countries and eventual incorporation of the security treaty into a broader Asia-Pacific regional security framework; promotion of a “Social Asia” of cultural coexistence and democracy.
- International cooperation and UN reform: centering of world security on the United Nations and other international institutions; Japanese contribution of personnel and funds in accordance with the Constitution; participation in all UN peacekeeping activities that do not presuppose the use of force (under the International Peace Cooperation Law); non-participation in peace-enforcement units or multinational forces that presuppose the use of force; reform of the Security Council and strengthening of the Economic and Social Council; support for NGOs, including legal personality and financial assistance.
- Coexistence-type market economy: market economy that lives with the environment and fair free trade; shift from an “economy of efficiency and quantity” to an “economy of life and quality”; expansion of social common capital and a domestic-demand-centered, consumer-oriented economy; necessary regulation for environmental protection, consumer protection, and food and drug safety; removal of regulations that obstruct market vitality; support for venture and small/medium enterprises; promotion of environment- and energy-saving technologies, new energy, new materials, and new media; revitalization of agriculture, forestry, and fisheries oriented toward food security and land/environment conservation; introduction of labor–management co-determination systems; solidarity with NGOs, NPOs, environmental movements, consumer cooperatives, and policy-proposal civic movements.
- Political reform: elevation of politicians’ ethics and insight; restoration of political leadership over policy decisions from the bureaucracy; reform of the budget process so that politics (centered on the Cabinet Secretariat) leads; elimination of political corruption (ban on corporate donations, breaking of the politician–bureaucracy–business nexus); greater transparency and participatory politics close to citizens’ lives; promotion of disclosure of administrative information.
- Decentralization and autonomy: transfer of powers and financial resources from the central government to local governments to establish regional sovereignty; reorganization and transfer of agency-delegated and licensing affairs; simplification and consolidation of central ministries; realization of local governments capable of regional diplomacy suited to an internationalized era.
- New forms of family and social equality of women and men: respect for individuals and diverse forms of family and living communities; freedom of choice regarding separate surnames for spouses; equality of rights within families; respect for children’s personality and rights; realization of social equality between women and men and rejection of sexual division of labor; establishment of women’s right to self-determination regarding their health; introduction of quota systems for women in public office, parties, and organizations; equal opportunities in education, employment, and vocational training for young women and men; promotion of young people’s participation in culture, arts, sports, volunteer work, politics, and social activities (including public support for culture, enrichment of public leisure and cultural facilities, and realization of voting rights at age 18).
- Educational reform, culture, and freedom of religion: shift from centralized, uniform education focused on knowledge and technique to education that develops individuality, teaches historical truth, and cultivates wisdom gained from daily life as lifelong nourishment; education of children in the ideals of freedom and autonomy, mutual respect and social responsibility, democracy, and international cooperation; realization of inclusive education (joint schooling of children with and without disabilities) and education that transmits traditional cultural values; transfer of primary and secondary education to local governments and complete decentralization of educational administration.

The declaration concludes by stating that the party will present these basic values and policy goals widely to the people, connect new political forces and individuals, and challenge continuous reform of politics, the economy, and society.

== Influence ==
The 95 Declaration was adopted in the final phase of the Japan Socialist Party, shortly before the party’s transformation into the Social Democratic Party in 1996. It represented an attempt to redefine the party’s identity for a post-Cold War, post-1955 System era and to provide a programmatic basis for participation in a broader democratic-liberal new party. In practice, the JSP’s organizational decline continued, and the declaration’s vision of a new civic party was only partially realized in subsequent party realignments.

The document superseded the earlier New Declaration of the Japan Socialist Party (1986) as the party’s basic programmatic text.

== See also ==
- New Declaration of the Japan Socialist Party
- Unified Socialist Party Platform
- The Road to Socialism in Japan
- Japan Socialist Party Platform (1945)
- Japan Socialist Party
- Social Democratic Party (Japan)
