= Kōdō Itō =

- 伊藤 好道
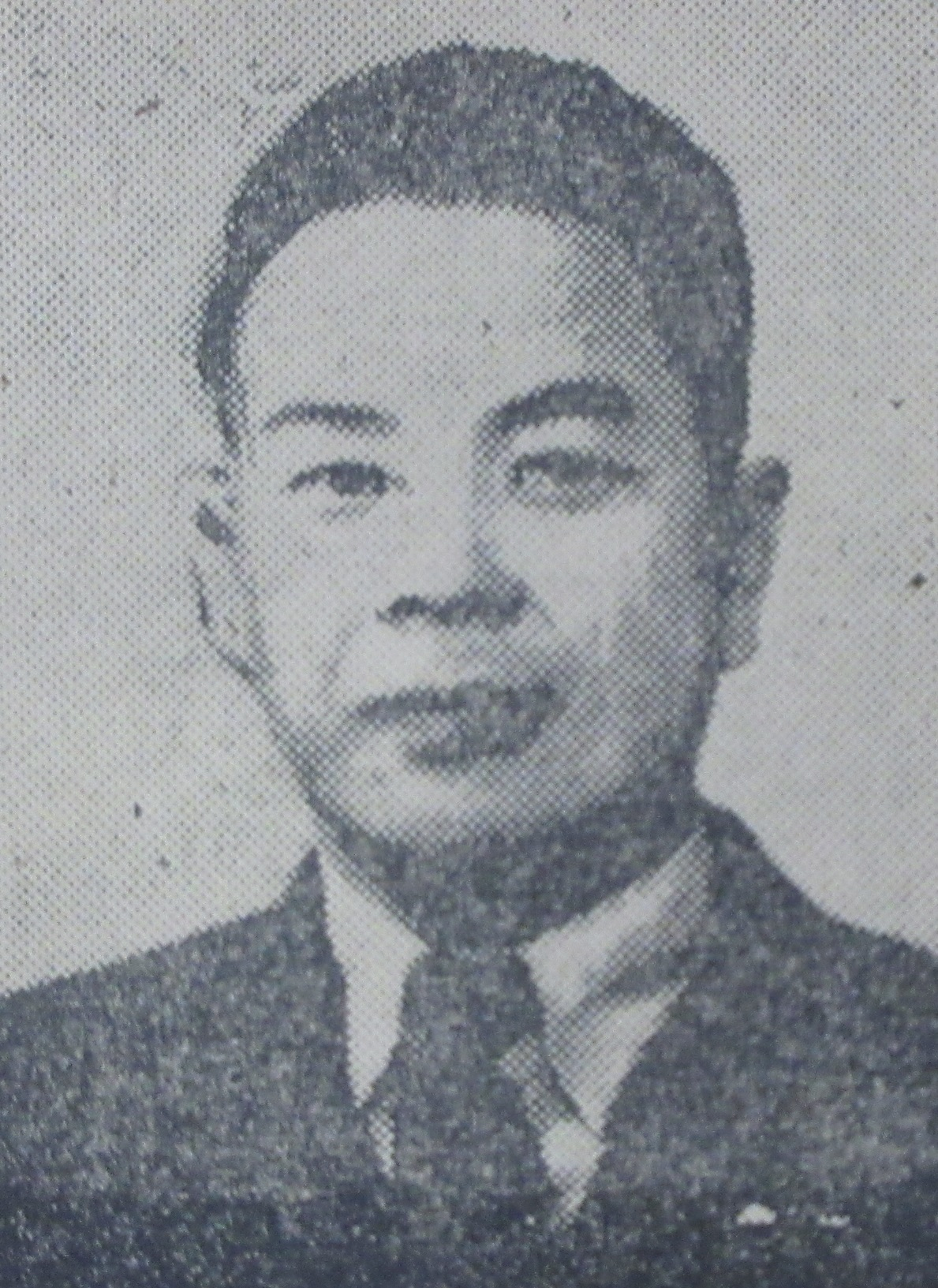

Member of the House of Representatives
- In office 1 October 1952 – 10 December 1956
- Constituency: Former Aichi 4th district

Personal details
- Born: December 5, 1901 Negawa Village, Nishikamo District, Aichi Prefecture, Japan (now Chōkōji, Toyota)
- Died: December 10, 1956 (aged 55)
- Party: (Japan Socialist Party →); Leftist Socialist Party
- Spouse: Yoshiko Itō
- Education: Tokyo Imperial University Faculty of Law (Political Science); Tokyo Imperial University Faculty of Economics (Economics)

Kōdō Itō (伊藤 好道, Itō Kōdō, 5 December 1901 – 10 December 1956) was a Japanese politician. He was a member of the House of Representatives for the Leftist Socialist Party (three terms).

== Biography ==
Itō was born in Negawa Village, Nishikamo District, Aichi Prefecture (now Chōkōji, Toyota). In 1914 he graduated from Koromo Second Ordinary Elementary School (now Toyota Municipal Negawa Elementary School). In 1919 he graduated from Meiji Middle School (now Meiji University Meiji High School and Junior High School). He studied at the First Higher School and the Faculty of Law of Tokyo Imperial University, and participated in the Shinjinkai. He graduated from the university in 1925 and joined the Chūgai Shōgyō Shinpō (predecessor of the Nihon Keizai Shimbun). In the same year he married Yoshiko Itō, from the same hometown. At the Chūgai Shōgyō Shinpō he served as editorial director of Chūgai Zaikai, editorial writer, and deputy head of the economics department, and was also listed as an editorial collaborator of the Shakai Shisōsha. He also entered the Faculty of Economics of Tokyo Imperial University as a graduate with a bachelor's degree and graduated in 1928.

In 1937 he was arrested in connection with the Popular Front Incident, left the Chūgai Shōgyō Shinpō, and in 1939 became a temporary employee of the Research Department of the South Manchuria Railway, supporting himself during the war years.

After the war, when the Institute of Socialist Politics and Economics was established centered on Mosaburō Suzuki, he became a director and, through this connection, joined the Japan Socialist Party in 1945. After losing two House of Representatives elections, he participated in the founding of the Socialist Association in 1951. When the Socialist Party split into left and right wings, he was involved in drafting the platform of the Leftist Socialist Party together with Itsurō Sakisaka and Junzō Inamura.

In the 1952 general election he was elected for the first time as a Leftist Socialist Party candidate, and was subsequently re-elected twice (three terms in total). During this period he served as a Central Executive Committee member and Vice-Chairman of the Policy Research Council of the Leftist Socialist Party. In October 1955, upon the reunification of the Socialist Party, he drafted the platform (Unified Socialist Party Platform), which met with intense opposition from Socialist Association-affiliated party members. After reunification he became Chairman of the party's Policy Research Council.

On 10 December 1956 he died at the University of Tokyo Hospital from complications of diabetes and cerebral hemorrhage. He was 55 years old. A memorial address was delivered by Kanae Kobayashi in the House of Representatives plenary session on 12 December.

According to one account, criticism from Hitoshi Yamakawa, Sakisaka and others opposed to the Unified Socialist Party Platform left him feeling like a traitor, and excessive drinking damaged his health. Hiroo Wada was designated as his successor as Policy Research Council Chairman. His electoral base in the former Aichi 4th district was taken over by his wife Yoshiko Itō, who served two terms.

== House of Representatives election results ==
Date	Election	Party	Result
25 April 1947	23rd	Japan Socialist Party	Lost
23 January 1949	24th	Japan Socialist Party	Lost
1 October 1952	25th	Leftist Socialist Party	Elected
19 April 1953	26th	Leftist Socialist Party	Elected
27 February 1955	27th	Leftist Socialist Party	Elected

== Notes ==
Party political offices
Preceded by New post	Chairman of the Policy Research Council of the Japan Socialist Party; 1st: 1955–1956	Succeeded by Hiroo Wada
