= Waseda University Military Research Group Incident =

1923 political incident at Waseda University

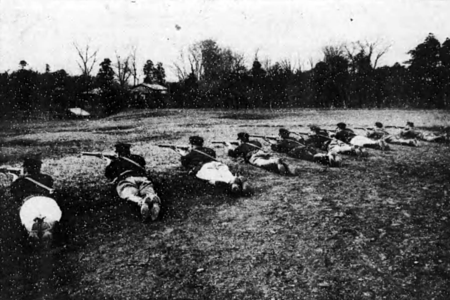
Military training (skirmish drill) by the Waseda Military Research Group

Waseda University Military Research Group Incident (早稲田大学軍事研究団事件, Waseda Daigaku Gunji Kenkyūdan Jiken) was an incident in 1923 at Waseda University involving opposition to military education. It is also known as the Waseda Military Education Incident (早大軍教事件).

== Overview ==
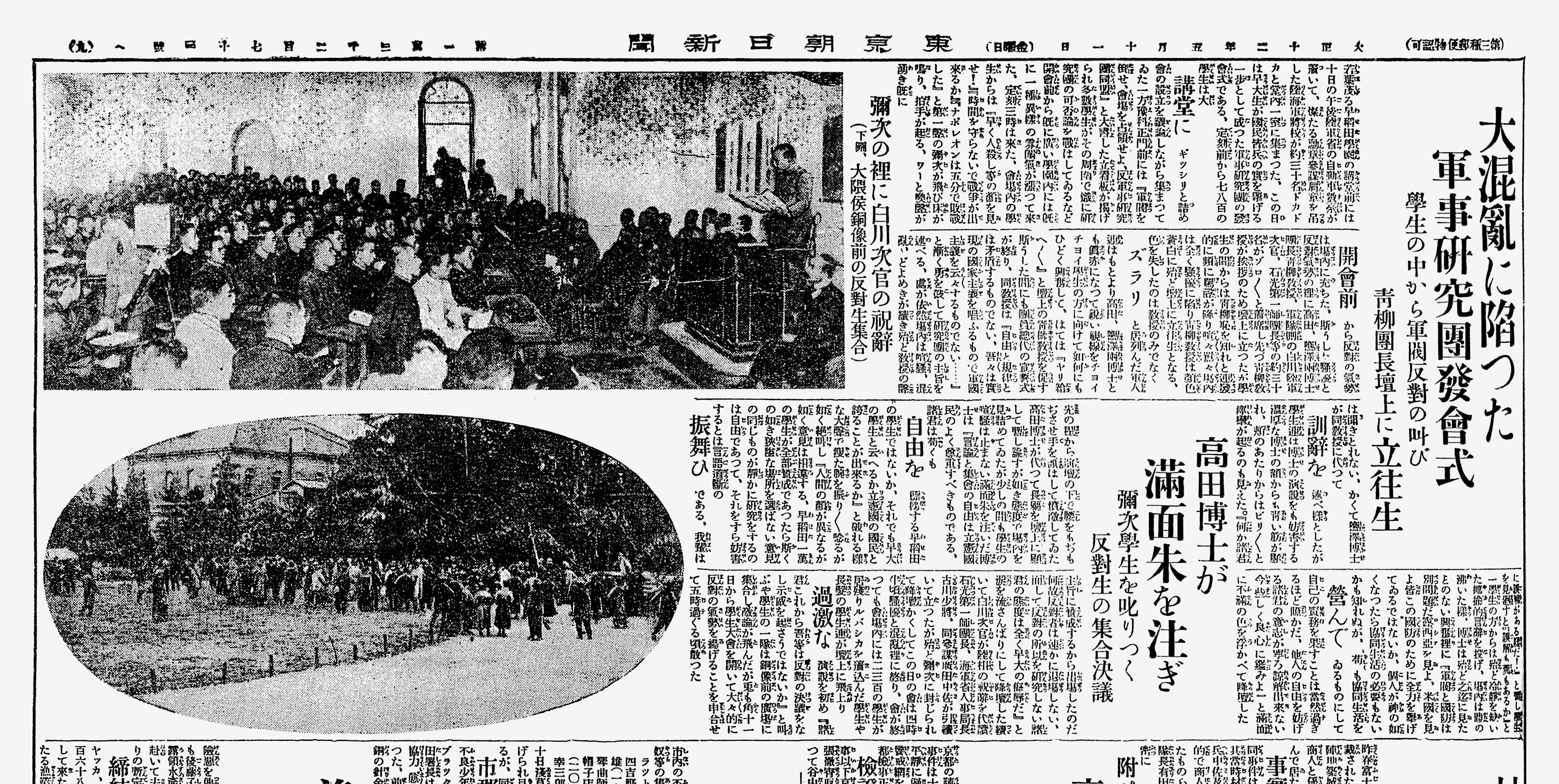
Waseda students disrupting the founding ceremony of the Military Research Group (Tokyo Asahi Shimbun, May 11, 1923, morning edition, p. 9)

Following World War I, surplus officers and weapons from disarmament were repurposed to promote militarization of schools. This first occurred at Waseda University. On May 10, 1923, the Military Research Group (led by Professor Aoyagi Atsutsune), formed from the Riding Student Group with close ties to the Imperial Japanese Army, held its founding ceremony.

The group aimed to "take the lead in supporting student military education, study military education as seen in universities in Europe and America, contribute to national defense from the students' standpoint, and at the same time eliminate the red (communist ideology) that had infested the university." It established departments including headquarters, ideology, military, science/engineering research, and national defense.

The founding ceremony was held on the second floor of the Waseda University auditorium on May 10, attended by more than a dozen key figures from the army and navy, including Vice Minister of War Shirakawa Yoshinori. In opposition, students from the Cultural Alliance (an on-campus group of the Builders' League), advised by Ōyama Ikuo and Sano Manabu, fiercely protested and disrupted the ceremony.

On May 12, the Waseda University Oratorical Society sponsored an "Exterminate the Military Research Group" speech rally in the central courtyard, but members of the judo and sumo clubs, along with reactionary forces from inside and outside the university, stormed the event, resulting in many injuries.

Due to this great chaos, students Asanuma Inejirō, Hayashi Tatsumaro, Morisaki Genkichi (from the first Japanese Communist Party), Inamura Ryūichi, and a Mr. Tokano (戸叶某) and others, who suffered injuries to their faces and heads, rushed to nearby clinics for treatment.

— Tokyo Asahi Shimbun, May 13, 1923

As a result, young professors, alumni such as Ogawa Mimei and Akita Ujaku, also condemned the group, and on May 15 the Military Research Group was forced to disband. However, alumni volunteers centered on the Vertical and Horizontal Club viewed the Cultural Alliance as a vanguard of socialism and demanded its dissolution; on May 20, the Cultural Alliance was also compelled to disband.

Furthermore, on June 5, raids on the research rooms of professors Sano Manabu and Inomata Tsunao, known as the "Research Room Trampling Incident" occurred, becoming a trigger for the First Japanese Communist Party Incident.

== See also ==
- First Japanese Communist Party Incident
