= Ryūichi Inamura =

Japanese peasant movement activist and politician

- 稲村 隆一
- Sōichi Ōya, Ki Kimura, Ryūichi Inamura in 1925

Member of the House of Representatives
- In office 28 February 1955 – 25 April 1958
- Constituency: Old Niigata 3rd district
- In office 21 November 1960 – 2 December 1969

Personal details
- Born: March 7, 1898 Kimobetsu, Hokkaido, Japan
- Died: November 20, 1990 (aged 92)
- Party: Japan Socialist Party
- Relatives: Junzō Inamura (brother); Toshio Inamura (nephew)
- Education: Waseda University (Faculty of Political Science and Economics)

Ryūichi Inamura (稲村 隆一, Inamura Ryūichi, 7 March 1898 – 20 November 1990) was a Japanese peasant movement activist and politician who served four terms in the House of Representatives. Active in the prewar agrarian and leftist movements, he belonged successively to the Japanese Communist Party, the Labour-Farmer Party, the Social Masses Party, and the Tōhōkai, before joining the Japan Socialist Party after the war. He was purged from public office during the Allied occupation and later returned the Order of the Sacred Treasure in protest against its award to Ryōichi Sasakawa. His younger brother was politician Junzō Inamura and his nephew was Toshio Inamura.

== Biography ==
Inamura was born on 7 March 1898 (Meiji 31) in Kutchan Village (present-day Kutchan, Hokkaido), Abuta District, Hokkaido, as the eldest son of Dōsaburō and Tama Inamura. His parents were from Matsuzaki Village (present-day Matsuzaki, Higashi-ku, Niigata City), Nakakanbara District, Niigata Prefecture, and had settled in Kutchan as civilian pioneers in 1895. After his father failed in a miso and soy sauce manufacturing business, he succeeded in land reclamation and ranch management in what is now Kimobetsu, Hokkaido. The family later moved to Sapporo after the father sold the farm.

He graduated from Hokkai Middle School (now Hokkai High School) in 1918 and from the Faculty of Political Science and Economics at Waseda University in 1923. While at Waseda, he joined the Minjin Dōmeikai (People's Alliance) and later the Kensetsusha Dōmei (Builders' League). He became involved in the peasant movement around this time and guided the formation of a tenant farmers' association in his parents' hometown of Matsuzaki in Niigata Prefecture. During this period, he joined the Japanese Communist Party (First Communist Party) and worked on the editing of its legal organ Nōmin Undō (Peasant Movement).

After graduating from Waseda, he continued as a peasant movement activist. He joined the Japan Farmers' Union (Nihon Nōmin Kumiai) in 1925 and became a standing executive committee member in 1926. That same year, he joined the Labour-Farmer Party. Together with Shōichi Miyake and Inejirō Asanuma, he led the peasant movement in Niigata Prefecture and was involved in disputes such as the Kizaki Village tenant farmers' dispute. In 1928, he was arrested in the March 15 incident and sentenced to two years' imprisonment with three years' suspended sentence. After his release, he worked with Kanemitsu Hosohako to establish the New Labour-Farmer Party.

In 1932, he founded the Jichi Nōmin Kyōgikai (Autonomous Farmers' Council) and joined the Social Masses Party. In 1937, as part of the anti-mainstream faction of the Social Masses Party, he sought cooperation with the Tōhōkai. In 1938, he formed the Niigata Prefecture Japan Farmers' Federation and became a standing committee member of the Japan Farmers' Federation (Nihon Nōmin Renmei). He joined the Tōhōkai in 1940. In the 1942 general election, he ran unsuccessfully as a Tōhōkai candidate in the Niigata 2nd district. He also participated in Kanji Ishiwara's East Asia League movement.

After the war, he joined the Japan Socialist Party but was subject to the purge of public officials.

In 1955, following the death of his brother Junzō Inamura, he ran as a replacement candidate in the 27th general election for the House of Representatives from the old Niigata 3rd district and was elected in a sympathy vote.

He lost in the 1958 general election but was re-elected in three consecutive elections starting from the 1960 general election. He served as a Japan Socialist Party member of the House of Representatives until 1969 (a total of four terms).

As a member of the Socialist Party left wing, he served as a central executive committee member and chairman of the Special Committee on Hokkaido Development. He also served as president of Chūetsu Kyōdō Insatsu and chairman of the Japan-Soviet Friendship Association (Nisso Shinzen Kyōkai), and became president of Insatsu Center in 1976.

In the spring of 1970, he was awarded the Order of the Sacred Treasure, 2nd Class. However, in 1978, he returned the decoration in protest against the award of the Order of the Sacred Treasure, Grand Cordon to Ryōichi Sasakawa (chairman of the Japan Shipbuilding Industry Foundation, now the Nippon Foundation). He stated that he did not know Sasakawa personally but criticized the awarding of a decoration to the head of an organization involved in gambling, which he regarded as a root of social evil.

Inamura died on 20 November 1990 at the age of 92.

== Anecdotes ==
- While at Hokkai Middle School, he formed the "Ushioi-kai" (Cattle-Driving Society) in memory of Shizuka Asaba together with Seion Kawamata and Eitarō Noro. He was also a member of the Hokkai Middle School debate club with Kawamata.
- He was one of the nominal holders of a one-tsubo shared land plot related to the New Tokyo International Airport (now Narita International Airport).

== Major works ==
- Nōmin undō no keizaiteki narabi ni seijiteki kiso (The Economic and Political Foundations of the Peasant Movement) (Nishōdō Shoten, 1927)
- Nihon ni okeru nōgyō kyōkō (The Agricultural Panic in Japan) (co-authored with Junzō Inamura, Hakuyōsha, 1931)
- Nihon nōson shakaishi (Social History of Japanese Rural Villages) (Nihon Nōson Shakaishi Kankōkai, 1969)

He authored numerous books, particularly on rural issues.

== See also ==
- Waseda University Military Research Group Incident
