= New Declaration of the Japan Socialist Party =

1986 programmatic declaration of the Japan Socialist Party

The New Declaration of the Japan Socialist Party (日本社会党の新宣言, Nihon Shakaitō no Shin Sengen) was the party platform of the Japan Socialist Party (JSP) from 1986 to 1995. Its official title is "New Declaration of the Japan Socialist Party – Creation through Love, Knowledge, and Power".

Adopted on 22 January 1986 at a continued session of the 50th Party Congress (together with a five-point accompanying resolution), it formally superseded the earlier programmatic documents The Road to Socialism in Japan (commonly known as "The Road") and the 1955 Unified Socialist Platform, declaring them historical. The New Declaration redefined the goal of socialism as the step-by-step advance of reforms leading to a qualitative transformation of society, rather than construction through a "peaceful revolution." It also redefined the JSP as a "national party" open to all working people, marking a clear break from its previous identity as a "class-based mass party." In this sense it was a landmark platform that aligned the JSP more closely with Western social democracy. It remained in force until it was itself superseded by the "95 Declaration – New Basic Values and Policy Goals" in 1995.

== History of adoption ==
After the 34th Party Congress in 1970, the right-wing faction of the JSP, centered around Saburō Eda, called for a review of the party's programmatic document The Road to Socialism in Japan (commonly known as "The Road"). This was strongly opposed by the left-wing faction, centered on the Japan Socialist Association. The party executive under chairman Tomomi Narita and Secretary-General Masashi Ishibashi also rejected the right wing's demands.

In September 1977, at the 41st Party Congress, the Narita–Ishibashi leadership resigned. A policy document titled "Immediate Directions for Party Reform" was adopted, which included a specific section on re-examining "The Road." It called for creatively developing the party's long-term line—including "The Road," the new medium-term policy, and the National Unity Platform—to respond to changing conditions.

Thereafter, the review of "The Road" proceeded in earnest. At the 42nd Congress in 1978, the Socialist Theory Center was established. Its tasks included research to creatively develop "The Road," the new medium-term line, and the National Unity Platform in light of changing conditions; adjusting the relationship between "The Road" and the party platform; and examining the "Vision of Socialism" within medium-term economic policy (a paper by Tsutomu Ōuchi).

These efforts resulted in two documents: "The Outlook for Domestic and International Conditions in the 1980s and the JSP's Line" (adopted at the 46th Congress in February 1982) and "The Creation of a New Society – Our Vision of Socialism" (adopted at the 47th Congress in December 1982).

In June 1985, a draft titled "New Declaration of the Japan Socialist Party – Performance through Love, Knowledge, and Power" was published. It stated that once the New Declaration was adopted, "The Road" and the Unified Socialist Platform would become historical documents. In December 1985, the title was changed to "New Declaration of the Japan Socialist Party – Creation through Love, Knowledge, and Power" and submitted to the 50th Party Congress. Due to fierce opposition, it was not adopted at that time. After some revisions, it was adopted on 22 January 1986 at a continued session of the congress, together with a five-point accompanying resolution titled "Resolution on the New Declaration". It passed by unanimous vote.

== Contents ==
Introduction Since its founding, the Japan Socialist Party has contributed to world peace and friendship and has served as a bulwark for democracy and the improvement of people's lives. However, except for the short-lived Tetsu Katayama cabinet, the party has never held power. The Japan Socialist Party is now determined to develop into a party that can govern together with the people. The founding platform, the unified platform, and "The Road to Socialism" have become historical documents in light of changes in the times and the party's own progress.

Aiming for Human Liberation – The Ideals and Basic Policies of Socialism Every human being has the right to live a life worthy of a human being. Socialism means advancing step by step toward human liberation, carrying out reforms and achieving a qualitative transformation of society. The Constitution of Japan embodies precisely this ideal.

Observing Today's Society – The Tasks of Socialism in Contemporary Japan The socialist movement developed in opposition to the evils of capitalism. It was socialists who gave substance to democracy through their activities. The Russian Revolution delivered a major shock to the world as a system opposing the evils of capitalism. However, the character of so-called existing socialism is fundamentally different from the socialism sought by the Japan Socialist Party, and the party does not follow that path.

Changing the Course of Movement and Reform – The Unfolding of Socialism Socialism is the path of comprehensive political, economic, and social movements and reforms carried out and advanced by the people themselves. Resistance, participation and intervention, and creation through government and people's autonomy are the fundamentals of the socialist movement.

In politics, the party aims to fully realize freedom and democracy and to build a system that integrates the will of the people in economic and social fields to advance reform. In the economy, while using socialization, planning, and the effectiveness of the market economy, the party will regulate and guide the economy as a whole so that it properly serves the people's livelihood. Emphasis is placed on democracy in the economy and industry. Decision-making and participation in management by employees and consumers will be institutionalized in private enterprises and various government-related economic activities. In society, the party will promote daily reforms in people's living environments through diverse social movements by various national strata and groups.

Creating the Agents and Alliances – Who Will Advance Socialism? In the past, poverty and other ills were concentrated among workers, so it was natural for socialism at that time to take on a class character. Today's socialist movement is called upon to solve national and civic tasks. The Japan Socialist Party represents all working people and is a national party open to everyone. Solving contemporary problems requires more than alliances among the people themselves. The supporting framework for this is the coalition government that the Japan Socialist Party will lead. In today's world, coalition governments are commonplace amid the diversification of political consciousness and values.

The image of the Japan Socialist Party is clear blue and a deep crimson rose. Blue represents the future, brightness, and cleanliness. The deep crimson rose represents love, knowledge, and power. This declaration embodies the future of humanity and the happiness of the Japanese people.

== Impact ==
The New Declaration rejected the idea of constructing socialism through a "peaceful revolution" as represented by "The Road," redefining the goal of socialism as "advancing reform step by step to achieve a qualitative transformation of society." It also redefined the character of the party as a "national party," marking a clear break from its identity as a "class-based mass party." In this sense, the New Declaration was a landmark platform in the history of the Japan Socialist Party. Through it, the JSP distanced itself from Japanese-style social democracy and became a party with a platform aligned with Western social democracy.

However, the party executive and right-wing members who promoted the New Declaration failed to create new forms of activity based on it, and the JSP's actual movement style largely retained its previous character. The party's heavy defeat in the 1986 double election immediately after the declaration's adoption, and the subsequent departure of key promoters such as chairman Ishibashi from the leadership, further reinforced this tendency. The subtitle "Creation through Love, Knowledge, and Power" was also criticized for giving an overly conciliatory impression.

Marxist economist Hideaki Ōuchi, who played a major role in drafting the declaration, stated that it formally broke with Marxism–Leninism, and that it was fortunate the declaration had been adopted before the dramatic changes in the Soviet Union and Eastern Europe, thereby preserving the honor of Japanese socialism. Ōuchi viewed the reforms in the Soviet Union and Eastern Europe as a shift from revolutionary methods to social-democratic methods in socialist construction, and argued that the failure of Soviet-style socialism proved the realism of social democracy.

The New Declaration became a historical document with the adoption of the "95 Declaration – New Basic Values and Policy Goals" in 1995, which guided the movement to form a new party, and thereby completed its role.
