= Yoshiko Itō (politician) =

Japanese politician

- 伊藤 よし子
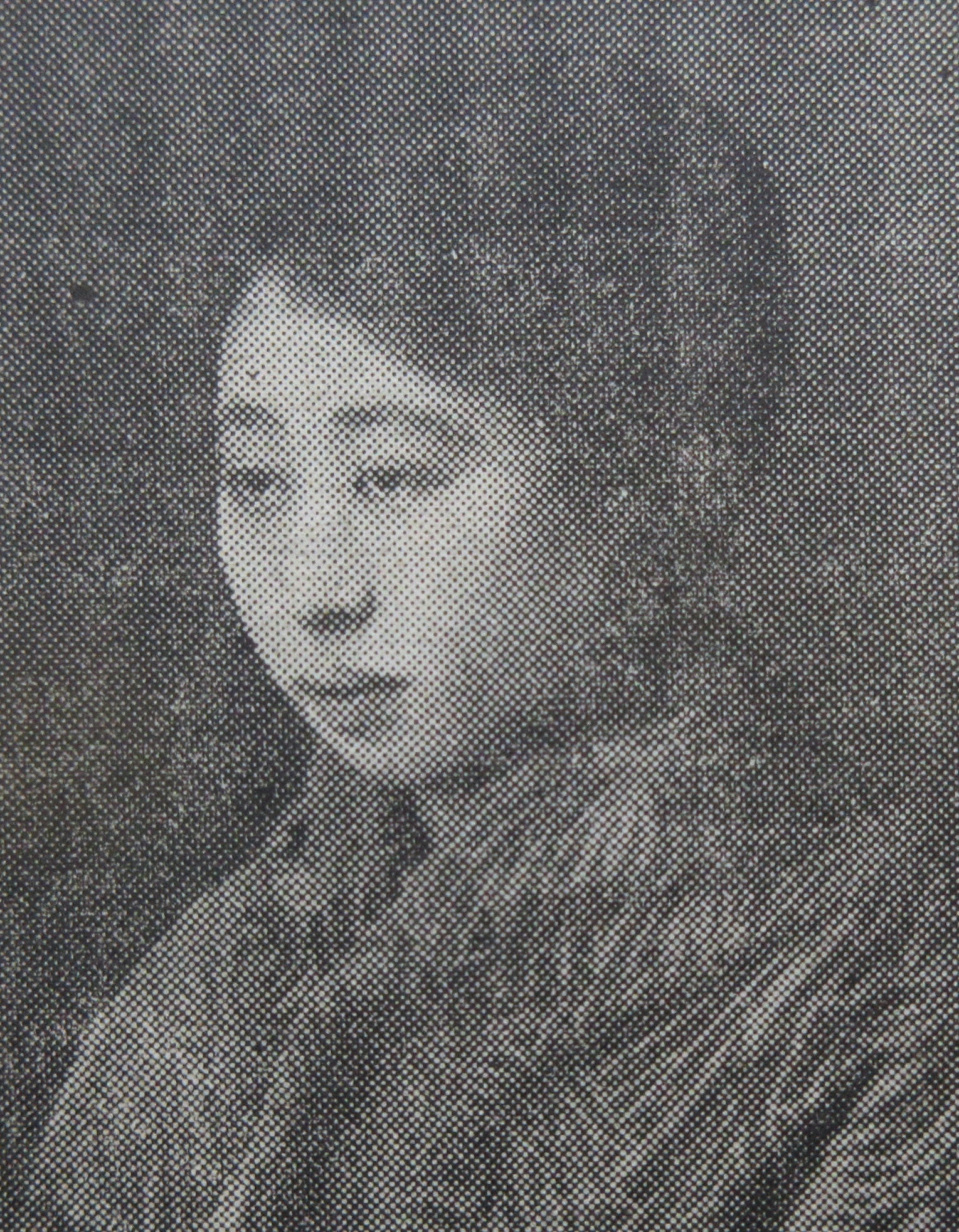

Member of the House of Representatives
- In office 22 May 1958 – 24 October 1960
- Constituency: Aichi 4th (medium-sized constituency)
- In office 21 November 1963 – 27 December 1966

Personal details
- Born: December 30, 1905 Koromo Town, Nishikamo District, Aichi Prefecture, Japan
- Died: March 24, 1991 (aged 85)
- Party: Japan Socialist Party
- Spouse: Kōdō Itō
- Relatives: Kōji Honda (brother-in-law)
- Education: Sugiyama First Higher Girls' School

Yoshiko Itō (伊藤 よし子, Itō Yoshiko; 30 December 1905 – 24 March 1991) was a Japanese politician. She was a member of the House of Representatives for the Japan Socialist Party (two terms).

She entered politics by succeeding to the political base of her husband, Kōdō Itō, after his sudden death. Kōji Honda, who served as a member of the House of Representatives and the Aichi Prefectural Assembly, was her brother-in-law.

== Career ==
She was born as the third daughter of general store owner Naruse Yasuyoshi in Koromo Town, Nishikamo District, Aichi Prefecture (present-day Shōwa-chō 4-chōme, Toyota City). Her maiden name was Naruse. She attended Koromo First Ordinary Elementary School (now Toyota Municipal Koromo Elementary School) and then progressed to Koromo Ordinary Higher Elementary School (now Toyota Municipal Dōjiyama Elementary School), known as the "mountain school." She was familiar with magazines that supported Taishō Democracy, such as Kaizō and Kaihō. At the time there was only one bookstore in Koromo Town, and of the four copies of Kaizō distributed monthly throughout Nishikamo District, Itō subscribed to one. In her third year she took the transfer examination for Sugiyama First Higher Girls' School (now Sugiyama Jogakuen High School) and entered. After graduating in March 1922 (Taishō 11), she studied stenography at the Tsukuda Stenography School founded by Tsukuda Yojirō. She also attended the Tokyo School of Foreign Languages (old system) for one year.

In 1923 (Taishō 12), at an alumni meeting held at Koromo Ordinary Higher Elementary School, Kōdō Itō, then a student at Tokyo Imperial University, gave a lecture. Itō appealed tearfully for relief funds for the famine that had struck Russia from 1921 to 1922, concluding with the words of explorer Fridtjof Nansen: "To know and not to help is the same as to kill." Deeply moved, Yoshiko donated all the money she had in her purse at the time. After returning home, she sent an anonymous donation to Kōdō using pocket money from her mother, claiming she had learned of the relief fund in Kaihō. The sender became known to Kōdō, and this became the occasion for the start of their correspondence. Under Kōdō's guidance she voraciously read works such as August Bebel's Woman and Socialism (translated by Kikue Yamakawa), Yamakawa's The Rebellion of Women, and Friedrich Engels's Ludwig Feuerbach and the End of Classical German Philosophy.

As a member of the Shinjinkai at Tokyo Imperial University, Kōdō toured high schools nationwide giving lectures together with Hisao Kuroda and Yoshio Shiga. On the way he stopped in his hometown of Koromo Town, and the two met for the first time at the home of a friend of Yoshiko's older sister. (Note: Yoshiko later recalled their first meeting as follows: "That day, Itō passionately explained, 'We must become one of the gears of history and make this world a better place for people who work seriously, for the proletariat. To do that, we must build a socialist society. For that purpose we will become stepping stones.' I thought that was correct. Not to do what one thinks is right is cowardly. No matter what oppression or difficulties there may be, I thought. I was simple. But even now I do not think that simplicity was wrong.")

She repeatedly refused marriage proposals arranged by her parents, including those involving the only sons of wealthy families, (Note: At first she thought she should follow her parents' wishes and was once scheduled to marry into a family in Tajimi Town, Gifu Prefecture. Yoshiko recalled: "Although on the one hand I had grandiose ideas about the socialist movement, regarding the issue of marriage I was simple and childish, and without even considering what kind of person the other party was, just as the matchmaker said, he ran a pottery kiln and was the only son of a local man of some means. I thought that if after marriage I could save my pocket money and send funds for the movement, that would be one way of living, so I was appallingly ignorant.") and on 18 March 1925 (Taishō 14) she went to Tokyo. They began married life at Kōdō's boarding house in Kōenji.

In 1927 (Shōwa 2) she belonged to a social science study group of editors of labor and peasant women's magazines. She studied under Kikue Yamakawa and formed friendships with novelist Taiko Hirabayashi and social activist Magara Kondō. Before the war she was involved in rural issues as a commissioned officer of the Rural Rehabilitation Association and the Manchuria Migration Association. After Kōdō Itō was first elected to the House of Representatives in the 1952 general election, she served as his secretary.

=== Election to the House of Representatives ===
On 10 December 1956 (Shōwa 31), Kōdō Itō died suddenly at the age of 55. Yoshiko was encouraged by Taiko Hirabayashi to succeed him. Kōdō and Hirabayashi's husband, Jinji Kobori, had been comrades arrested together in the Popular Front Incident. Hirabayashi's advice was natural as a close friend, but Yoshiko was troubled and consulted Japan Socialist Party Chairman Mosaburō Suzuki. Suzuki replied, "I'll have someone like Michiko Fujiwara go to the local area and build up the atmosphere," and urged her to run. Independently of Suzuki's thinking, the Socialist Party asked Toyota Motor President Taizō Ishida to put forward a successor from the Toyota labor union. However, Ishida insisted "Yoshiko is fine," and the party moved to endorse Kazuo Ōta, secretary-general of the Nagoya Railroad labor union. (Note: Upon Kōdō Itō's death, Toyota Motor Industrial President Taizō Ishida gave Yoshiko a large condolence gift. When Yoshiko went to thank him, Ishida said: "The Liberal Democratic Party is doing nothing but bad things. Nishio (note: Suehiro Nishio) is the same as the left of the LDP. In the future I wanted someone like Mr. Kōdō to handle Japanese politics, but it's regrettable. As for a successor, you could do it professionally.") In July 1957 (Shōwa 32), the Toyota Labor Union Council decided to recommend Yoshiko.

In the 28th general election for the House of Representatives held on 22 May 1958 (Shōwa 33), the Socialist Party ultimately endorsed both Yoshiko and Ōta in the former Aichi 4th district. Yoshiko's election campaign manager was Hideharu Honda, a survivor of the atomic bombing of Hiroshima and the son of Kōji Honda. With the support of the Toyota labor union and the National Railway Workers' Union, she was elected for the first time. She devoted herself passionately to social security issues.

In the 1960 general election the Toyota labor union recommended both Itō and Akira Mori of the All-Japan Federation of Textile Workers' Unions (endorsed by the Democratic Socialist Party), but both lost. Despite support from Mosaburō Suzuki, Taiko Hirabayashi, Sumako Fukao and others, Itō finished as runner-up.

She made a comeback in the 1963 general election. She successively served as vice-president of the National Federation of Livelihood Associations and as head of the Socialist Party's Women's Policy Department, among other positions.

In the 1967 general election, because Itō's support rate among Toyota votes was rising, conservatives raised the concern that "if this continues, Sachio Urano, whose base overlaps in local Toyota, will be in danger," and efforts were made to undermine Itō's votes. In addition, former city councilor Keitarō Yatō, head of the Socialist Party Toyota City branch, switched to supporting Kazuo Ōta. As a result, she lost by a margin of only 356 votes to fourth-place winner Shirō Nakano.

She did not run in the December 1969 general election. This was because the Socialist Party made Kazuo Ōta, whose support base was the Nagoya Railroad labor union, the party's unified candidate following the candidacy of former Toyota Motor labor union chairman Takezō Watanabe under the Democratic Socialist Party endorsement. (Note: Although Kazuo Ōta became the party's unified candidate in the 1969 general election, his votes stagnated in areas such as Okazaki City, Anjō City, Nishio City, Nukata Town, and Kōta Town, and he finished as runner-up.)

In the April 1971 Aichi Prefectural Assembly election she ran in the Toyota City constituency (3 seats) but finished as runner-up.

On 24 March 1991 (Heisei 3) she died of acute pneumonia at Sankurō Hospital in Toyota City. She was 85 years old.

== Results in House of Representatives general elections ==
Date	Election	Party	Result
22 May 1958	28th	Japan Socialist Party	Elected
20 November 1960	29th	Japan Socialist Party	Defeated
21 November 1963	30th	Japan Socialist Party	Elected
29 January 1967	31st	Japan Socialist Party	Defeated

== Bibliography ==
- Miyagawa Rinsan, ed. (1962). Zen Okazaki chimei jinshi roku. Tōkai Shinbunsha.
- Shin tei seijika jinmei jiten Meiji–Shōwa. Nichigai Associates. 2003. ISBN 4-8169-1805-1.
- Hayashi Shigeru, Yoshiko Itō et al. (11 others) (1959). Mikawa gendaishi. Tōkai Taimuzu-sha.
- Taiko Hirabayashi (1957). Sabaku no hana. Kōbunsha.
