= Toshio Inamura =

Japanese educator and politician

- 稲村 稔夫

Member of the House of Councillors
- In office 10 July 1983 – 22 July 1995
- Constituency: Niigata at-large district

Mayor of Sanjō
- In office 9 July 1972 – 8 July 1976
- Preceded by: Tsunesuke Watanabe
- Succeeded by: Kentaro Takizawa

Personal details
- Born: August 16, 1928 Tokyo, Japan
- Died: March 12, 2000 (aged 71)
- Party: Japan Socialist Party; New Socialist Party of Japan
- Relatives: Father: Junzō Inamura (former Member of the House of Representatives); Uncle: Ryūichi Inamura (former Member of the House of Representatives)
- Education: Hokkaido University (College of Agriculture and Forestry)
- Occupation: Educator, politician

Toshio Inamura (稲村 稔夫, Inamura Toshio, 16 August 1928 – 12 March 2000) was a Japanese educator and politician. He served as a member of the House of Councillors and as mayor of Sanjō in Niigata Prefecture.

== Career ==
Inamura was born in Tokyo. He graduated from the College of Agriculture and Forestry of Hokkaido University in 1948. In May of the same year he became a teacher at Kutchan Junior High School in Abuta District, Hokkaido, and in 1950 a teacher at Utashinai High School. He was also active in the Japan Teachers' Union.

He later became a secretary at the headquarters of the Japan Socialist Party, serving as deputy director of the party's Farmers' Department and handling issues related to the reversion of Okinawa, the movement against atomic and hydrogen bombs, and farmers' movements. In 1969 he moved to Sanjō, his father's hometown, and served as deputy secretary-general of the party's Niigata Prefectural Headquarters and as an officer of the Niigata Prefectural Federation of the Japan Farmers' Union. He ran unsuccessfully in the 32nd House of Representatives general election in December 1969.

In 1972 he was elected mayor of Sanjō for the first time, making the city a progressive local government. He lost the subsequent mayoral election and served one term until July 1976. During his tenure he worked to improve social welfare, promote pollution control measures, and develop educational and sports facilities.

In the April 1978 Niigata gubernatorial election he ran with the recommendation of the Japan Socialist Party and the Japanese Communist Party but was defeated by the incumbent Takeo Kimi of the Liberal Democratic Party.

In the 13th House of Councillors ordinary election he was elected for the first time from the Niigata at-large district as a Japan Socialist Party candidate. He was re-elected in the 15th ordinary election and served two terms in the House of Councillors. During this period he served as Chairman of the House of Councillors Construction Committee, executive chairman of the Japan Socialist Party Niigata Prefectural Headquarters, chairman of the Sanjō Commerce and Industry Federation, chairman of the Hokushinetsu Small and Medium Enterprises Liaison Council, chairman of the Japan Farmers' Union Minami-Kanbara District Council, and standing director of the National Small and Medium Commerce and Industry Organizations Liaison Association.

He did not run in the 17th House of Councillors ordinary election. In 1996 he changed his party affiliation to the New Socialist Party of Japan and ran unsuccessfully in the 41st House of Representatives general election from Niigata 2nd district.

== National election history ==
- 32nd House of Representatives general election (Niigata 3rd district, December 1969, Japan Socialist Party official candidate) — Lost
- 13th House of Councillors ordinary election (Niigata at-large district, June 1983, Japan Socialist Party official candidate) — Elected
- 15th House of Councillors ordinary election (Niigata at-large district, July 1989, Japan Socialist Party official candidate) — Elected
- 41st House of Representatives general election (Niigata 2nd district, October 1996, New Socialist Party of Japan official candidate) — Lost

== Family ==
His father was Junzō Inamura (former Member of the House of Representatives and farmers' movement activist). His uncle was Ryūichi Inamura (former Member of the House of Representatives and farmers' movement activist).

== Anecdotes ==
- Because his father and uncle were left-wing farmers' movement activists, he himself was influenced by the farmers' movement. His hobbies included tinkering with agricultural machinery and growing roses.
- He signed a petition for the release of the political prisoner Sin Gwang-su.

== See also ==
- List of governors of Niigata Prefecture
- Masao Yoshida — Member of the House of Councillors from Niigata Prefecture (Japan Socialist Party) until 1983
- Kichinosuke Meguro — Successor candidate in the 17th House of Councillors ordinary election in 1995 (unsuccessful)
