= Kenichi Hosoda =

Japanese politician

- 細田 健一
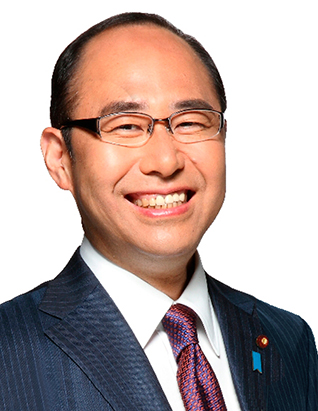
- Official portrait, 2011

Member of the House of Representatives
- Incumbent
- Assumed office 9 February 2026
- Preceded by: Multi-member district
- Constituency: Tōkai PR
- In office 19 December 2012 – 9 October 2024
- Preceded by: Eiichiro Washio
- Succeeded by: Makiko Kikuta
- Constituency: Niigata 2nd (2012–2017); Hokuriku-Shin'etsu PR (2017–2021); Niigata 2nd (2021–2024)

Personal details
- Born: 11 July 1964 (age 62) Nagoya, Aichi, Japan
- Party: Liberal Democratic
- Education: Kyoto University
- Occupation: Lawyer

Kenichi Hosoda (born 11 July 1964) is a Japanese politician who is a member of the House of Representatives of Japan.

== Biography ==
Hosoda graduated from Faculty of Law, Kyoto University and joined the Ministry of International Trade and Industry.
