= Motohiko Kondo =

Japanese politician

- 近藤 基彦
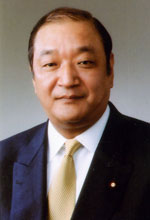
- Official portrait, 2008

Member of the House of Representatives
- In office 2 June 2000 – 21 July 2009
- Preceded by: Shin Sakurai
- Succeeded by: Eiichiro Washio
- Constituency: Niigata 2nd

Personal details
- Born: 15 February 1954 Aikawa, Niigata, Japan
- Died: 17 November 2018 (aged 64) Niigata, Japan
- Party: Liberal Democratic
- Education: Nihon University

Motohiko Kondo (近藤 基彦, Kondō Motohiko; 15 February 1954 – 17 November 2018) was a Japanese politician of the Liberal Democratic Party, who served as a member of the House of Representatives in the Diet (national legislature).

== Biography ==
A native of Niigata and graduate of Nihon University, he was elected for the first time in 2000 as an independent after an unsuccessful run in 1996.
