= Right Socialist Party Platform (Japan) =

1955 platform of the Right Socialist Party of Japan

The Right Socialist Platform (Japanese: 右社綱領, romanized: Usha kōryō), officially known as the Unified Socialist Party Platform Draft (Japanese: 統一社会党綱領草案, romanized: Tōitsu Shakaitō Kōryō Sōan), was the party platform adopted on 7 May 1955 by the Central Executive Committee of the Right Socialist Party of Japan (commonly called "Right Socialists" or "Right JSP"), one of the two factions into which the Japan Socialist Party had split in 1951. It is also referred to as the "so-called Right Socialist Platform." Prepared as a draft for a reunified party while talks with the Left Socialist Party advanced, the document articulated a democratic-socialist and social-democratic programme inspired by European models rather than the Rōnōha Marxism of the 1954 Left Socialist Platform. It stressed parliamentary democracy, peaceful (non-violent) revolution through an absolute majority in the National Diet, rejection of both fascism and international communism, a planned but non-totalitarian economy, and the character of the party as a broad mass organisation centred on the working class. Negotiations on a joint platform began shortly after its adoption. A compromise "Unified Socialist Party Platform" was agreed, and the Left and Right Socialist Parties reunified on 13 October 1955. The Right Socialist Platform was thereby superseded after being in force for only a few months, yet it remains historically significant as the clearest formal expression of the Right Socialists' democratic-socialist and anti-communist orientation.

== History of formulation ==
Following the 1951 split of the Japan Socialist Party over the Treaty of San Francisco and the U.S.–Japan Security Treaty, the Right Socialist Party initially lacked a comprehensive formal platform of its own. As reunification talks with the Left Socialist Party advanced in 1955, the Right Socialist Party prepared this document as a draft platform for a unified party. It was formally decided by the Right Socialist Party’s Central Executive Committee on 7 May 1955.

Negotiations on a joint platform between the two factions began around 8 May 1955. A compromise unified platform was later agreed, and the Left and Right Socialist Parties reunified on 13 October 1955. The Right Socialist Platform was thereby superseded after being in effect for only a few months.

The primary published source is the Japan Socialist Party Central Headquarters Organ Bureau’s Collection of Japan Socialist Party Platform Documents (『日本社会党綱領文献集』, 1978).

== Characteristics ==
The platform reflects the democratic socialist and social-democratic orientation of the Right Socialist Party, drawing on European social-democratic traditions rather than the Rōnōha Marxism that shaped the 1954 Left Socialist Platform. Key features include:

- Emphasis on socialism as the realization of human liberation, freedom, equality, and the abolition of exploitation of man by man.
- Strict parliamentary democracy and peaceful (non-violent) revolution achieved solely by winning an absolute majority in the National Diet.
- Explicit rejection of both fascism/Nazism and international communism (described as a new form of imperialism that suppresses freedom and democracy).
- Support for full political democracy (civil liberties including for opposition parties, independent judiciary, free elections), a planned but non-totalitarian socialist economy (public ownership of key industries while preserving private small-scale enterprise, cooperatives, and consumer choice), cultural freedom, and internationalism based on the United Nations Charter.
- Analysis of Japan’s postwar situation: the need to deepen democratization against conservative “reverse course” policies, address unequal aspects of the U.S.–Japan Security Treaty relationship, and counter communist “popular-front” tactics.
- Definition of the Japan Socialist Party as a broad mass party centered on the working class but open to farmers, fishermen, small business operators, intellectuals, and other working people who accept democratic socialism.

== Content ==
The document is divided into a lengthy preamble (historical overview) followed by sections on the aims and principles of socialism and on the character of the party and the method of peaceful revolution.

=== Preamble ===
The preamble surveys the rise of socialism from the Renaissance and French Revolution through the development and contradictions of capitalism, the different paths taken in advanced and colonial/underdeveloped countries, the challenges posed by fascism and communism, Japan’s unique modernization after the Meiji Restoration, the prewar socialist movement, postwar democratization measures, the 1945 founding of the Japan Socialist Party, the 1951 split, and the party’s recovery of political strength by the February 1955 general election.

=== Socialism’s aims and principles ===
- Socialism’s goal is the complete liberation of human personality and the creation of a society without exploitation of man by man through transformation of production relations and social institutions; seizure of power is not an end in itself.
- Achievement requires the voluntary, conscious participation of the people and cannot be determined solely by economic conditions.
- Socialism is an international movement that does not impose a single dogma.
- Political democracy: Socialism can flourish only in freedom and can be achieved only through democracy; democracy reaches its fullest expression only under socialism. Full civil liberties (speech, assembly, association, religion, conscience, free elections, independent judiciary) must be guaranteed to all, including opposition parties. Power is to be obtained solely by parliamentary majority through persuasion; violent revolution or one-party dictatorship is rejected. After taking power, the party must continue to respect opposition parties, judicial independence, and educational and intellectual freedom.
- Socialist economy: Public interest takes priority over private profit. Goals include full employment, development of productive forces, higher living standards, social security, and more equal distribution of income and property. Economic planning is required but must preserve freedom of occupation and consumption. Public ownership of key industries and public utilities is a means (not an end) to protect the people from monopoly exploitation. Private small-scale farming, retail, handicrafts, and medium-sized enterprises are compatible with socialism and should be protected from large-capital oppression while being encouraged to form cooperatives. Continuation of postwar land reform, agricultural modernization, and comprehensive national resource development are stressed. Democratic participation by workers and consumers in economic management is essential to prevent bureaucracy.
- Culture: Socialism guarantees economic and social rights (right to work, education, free medical care, social security, housing, etc.) and aims at a new culture and ethics based on human dignity. It opposes cultural uniformity or state control of the spirit, respects national culture, and seeks to eliminate feudal family constraints and racial or class prejudice.
- Internationalism: Socialism is inherently international and supports genuine national independence movements. It rejects all forms of imperialism (capitalist or communist), seeks to correct global economic inequality, upholds the United Nations Charter, supports collective security and world disarmament, and positions Japanese socialism as a bridge between Asian and European socialism.

=== Party character and method of peaceful revolution ===
- The Japan Socialist Party is an open party of democratic socialism centered on the working class and embracing broad working strata (farmers, fishermen, small business people, intellectuals, etc.).
- Membership is open to all who accept the party’s platform and rules; all members have equal rights and duties regardless of class origin.
- The party requires strong unity based on comradeship, respect for minority opinion, and intra-party democracy; free discussion followed by disciplined implementation of decisions.
- Party members must set a moral example and provide spiritual leadership to the masses.
- Socialism cannot be achieved by the party alone; close cooperation with democratic mass organizations is essential.
- Peaceful revolution is to be realized exclusively through winning a majority in the National Diet; no violent seizure of power is permitted.

== Influence ==
The Right Socialist Platform was in force for less than six months (May–October 1955). Upon the reunification of the Left and Right Socialist Parties it was replaced by a compromise “Unified Socialist Party Platform.” Nevertheless, it remains historically significant as the clearest formal statement of the Right Socialist Party’s democratic-socialist and anti-communist orientation, in contrast to the more explicitly Marxist Left Socialist Platform of 1954. Contemporary commentary, including from the Socialist Association, analyzed it as the Right’s contribution to the reunification process.

== See also ==
- Left Socialist Party Platform (Japan)
- Right Socialist Party of Japan
- Japan Socialist Party
- Japan Socialist Association
