= Niigata 2nd district =

Japanese electoral district

Niigata 2nd District
- 新潟県第2区
- Parliamentary constituency for the Japanese House of Representatives
- Prefecture: Niigata
- Proportional Block: Hokuriku Shinetsu PR
- Electorate: 402,082 (as of September 2022)

Current constituency
- Created: 1994
- Seats: One
- Party: LDP
- Representatives: Isato Kunisada

Niigata 2nd District (新潟県第2区, Niigata-ken dai-ni-ku) is an electoral district in the Japanese House of Representatives, the lower house of the National Diet. The district was established in 1994 as part of the general move from multi-member districts to single-member districts in the House of Representatives.

In the 2024 Japanese general election, incumbent candidate, former Economy Vice Minister Kenichi Hosoda was not endorsed by the LDP because of involvement in the 2023–2024 Japanese slush fund scandal and ran as an independent candidate.

== Areas covered ==
=== Current district ===
As of 2 February 2023, the areas covered by this district are as follows:

- Niigata
  - Minami
  - Nishi
  - Nishikan
- Sanjō
- Kamo
- Tsubame
- Nishikanbara District
- Minamikanbara District

As part of the 2022 redistricting, the wards of Niigata city would no longer be internally divided.

=== Areas 2013–2022 ===
From the first redistricting in 2013, until the second redistricting in 2022, the areas covered by this district were as follows:

- Niigata
  - Parts of Minami (former villages of Ajikata, Tsukigata and Nakanokuchi)
    - Mikata and Tsukigata branch offices
  - Parts of Nishi (former towns of Maki and Nishikawa)
    - Yotsugoya area
  - Nishikan
- Nagaoka (former towns of Koshiji, Mishima, Yoita, Teradomari Oguni and the former village of Washima)
  - Areas of Nishitsu that were formerly a part of Koshiji
- Kashiwazaki
- Tsubame
- Sado
- Nishikanbara District
- Santō District
- Kariwa District

As part of the 2013 redistricting, the district gained parts of Minami, Nishi and Nishikan wards from the 1st district and gained parts of the city of Nagaoka from the 5th district.

=== Areas from before 2013 ===
From the creation of the district in 1994 until the first redistricting in 2013, the areas covered by this district were as follows:

- Kashiwazaki
- Tsubame
- Ryōtsu
- Nishikanbara District
- Santo District
- Kariwa District
- Sado District

There was a small change in 2002 when the former town of Kurosaki in Nishinkanbara District was transferred to the 1st district, though the legal name of the town and county did not change.

== Elected representatives ==
Representative	Party	Years served	Notes
Shin Sakurai	LDP	1996 – 2000	Failed to win re-election in the 2000 general election
Motohiko Kondo	Indep.	2000 – 2003	Joined the Liberal Democratic Party before the next election
Motohiko Kondo	LDP	2003 – 2009	Was re-elected in the 2005 general election, but failed to win re-election in the 2009 Japanese election
Eiichiro Washio	DPJ	2009 – 2012	Failed to win re-election.
Kenichi Hosoda	LDP	2012 – 2017	
Eiichiro Washio	Indep.	2017 – 2021	
Kenichi Hosoda	LDP	2021 – 2024	Failed to win re-election.
Makiko Kikuta	CDP	2024 – 2026	Failed to win re-election but was elected to the PR Block
Isato Kunisada	LDP	2026 –	

== Election results ==
‡ - Also ran in the Hokuriku Shinetsu PR election

‡‡ - Also ran and won in the Hokuriku Shinetsu PR election

=== Elections in the 2020s ===
2026
Party	Candidate	Votes	%	±%
LDP	Isato Kunisada	111,803	49.0	
Centrist Reform	Makiko Kikuta‡‡	85,602	37.5	▼18.69
Sanseitō	Eriko Hirai	21,633	9.5	
Ishin	Noriko Kanai ‡	9,241	4.0	▼9.22
Registered electors		387,989		
Turnout		228,279	59.66	
LDP gain from Centrist Reform				

2024
Party	Candidate	Votes	%	±%
CDP	Makiko Kikuta	123,334	56.19	
Independent	Kenichi Hosoda (endorsed by LDP Niigata chapter)	67,124	30.58	▼29.32
Ishin	Motoyuki Inoue	29,023	13.22	
Registered electors		393,272		
Turnout				
CDP gain from Independent				

2021
Party	Candidate	Votes	%	±%
LDP	Kenichi Hosoda^{‡} (incumbent - Hokuriku Shinetsu PR) (endorsed by Komeito)	105,426	59.9	▲16.8
DPP	Sakae Takakura^{‡}	37,157	21.1	New
JCP	Taira Ayako^{‡} (endorsed by the SDP)	33,399	19.0	▲13.7
Registered electors		288,107		
Majority		68,269	38.8	▲30.3
Turnout		180,528	62.7	▼1.1
LDP gain from Independent				

=== Elections in the 2010s ===
2017
Party	Candidate	Votes	%	±%
Independent	Eiichiro Washio (incumbent - Hokuriku Shinetsu PR)	97,808	51.6	New
LDP	Kenichi Hosoda^{‡} (incumbent) (endorsed by Komeito)	81,705	43.1	▲0.1
JCP	Takehiko Igarashi	10,055	5.3	▼1.7
Registered electors		302,713		
Majority		16,103	8.5	▲8.4
Turnout		193,191	63.8	▲8.5
Independent gain from LDP		Swing		

2014
Party	Candidate	Votes	%	±%
LDP	Kenichi Hosoda^{‡} (incumbent) (endorsed by Komeito)	70,589	43.0	▼2.5
Democratic	Eiichiro Washio^{‡}	70,487	42.9	▲4.2
Social Democratic	Hideaki Watanabe^{‡}	11,801	7.2	▼2.9
JCP	Kazuo Goino	11,434	7.0	▲1.4
Registered electors		304,858		
Majority		102	0.1	▼6.7
Turnout		168,495	55.3	▼4.9
LDP hold		Swing		

2012
Party	Candidate	Votes	%	±%
LDP	Kenichi Hosoda^{‡} (endorsed by Komeito)	81,537	45.5	▲8.5
Democratic	Eiichiro Washio^{‡‡} (incumbent) (endorsed by the PNP)	69,389	38.7	▼13.6
Social Democratic	Hideaki Watanabe^{‡}	18,169	10.1	▲0.4
JCP	Toshihiro Miyaji	10,042	5.6	New
Registered electors		309,710		
Majority		12,148	6.8	New
Turnout		186,569	60.2	▼15.6
LDP gain from Democratic		Swing		

=== Elections in the 2000s ===
2009
Party	Candidate	Votes	%	±%
Democratic	Eiichiro Washio^{‡} (incumbent - Hokuriku Shinetsu PR)	122,686	52.3	▲8.0
LDP	Motohiko Kondo^{‡} (incumbent) (endorsed by Komeito)	86,960	37.0	▼12.7
Social Democratic	Noboru Yoneyama^{‡}	22,866	9.7	New
Happiness Realization	Satoshi Sugawara	2,257	1.0	New
Registered electors		315,884		
Majority		35,726	15.3	New
Turnout		239,377	75.8	▲2.3
Democratic gain from LDP		Swing		

2005
Party	Candidate	Votes	%	±%
LDP	Motohiko Kondo^{‡} (incumbent)	113,916	49.7	▲5.8
Democratic	Eiichiro Washio^{‡‡}	101,637	44.3	▲21.6
JCP	Yoshio Hosoi	13,727	6.0	▲0.4
Registered electors		320,718		
Majority		12,279	5.4	▼12.7
Turnout		235,856	73.5	▲4.0
LDP hold		Swing		

2003
Party	Candidate	Votes	%	±%
LDP	Motohiko Kondo^{‡} (incumbent)	95,391	43.9	▼5.2
Independent	Masayuki Fujishima (incumbent - Kyushu PR)	56,002	25.8	New
Democratic	Tomio Sakagami^{‡}	49,382	22.7	New
JCP	Yoko Yoneyama	12,225	5.6	▼4.0
Independent	Ko Nishikawa	4,132	1.9	New
Registered electors		321,636		
Majority		39,389	18.1	▲8.7
Turnout		223,537	69.5	▼6.4
LDP gain from Independent		Swing		

2000
Party	Candidate	Votes	%	±%
Independent	Motohiko Kondo	123,811	49.1	▲10.6
LDP	Arata Sakurai^{‡} (incumbent)	100,220	39.7	▼1.1
JCP	Fumihiko Murayama	24,172	9.6	▼3.6
Independent	Isamu Kawahara	4,009	1.6	New
Registered electors		Unknown		
Majority		23,591	9.4	New
Turnout		Unknown	75.9	▲4.7
Independent gain from LDP		Swing		

=== Elections in the 1990s ===
1996
Party	Candidate	Votes	%	±%
LDP	Arata Sakurai^{‡}	94,203	40.8	New
Independent	Motohiko Kondo	89,044	38.5	New
Democratic	Ichizo Kobayashi	17,335	7.5	New
JCP	Hiroshi Nozaki	13,883	6.0	New
New Socialist	Toshio Inamura^{‡}	12,503	5.4	New
Independent	Ko Nishikawa	4,093	1.8	New
Registered electors		339,397		
Majority		5,159	2.3	New
Turnout		241,481	71.2	New
LDP win (new seat)				
