= Masashi Ishibashi =

Masashi Ishibashi may refer to:

- Masashi Ishibashi (politician) (1924–2019), Taiwanese-born Japanese politician
- Masashi Ishibashi (actor) (1933–2018), Japanese karateka and actor
