= Builders League =

Japanese socialist student movement

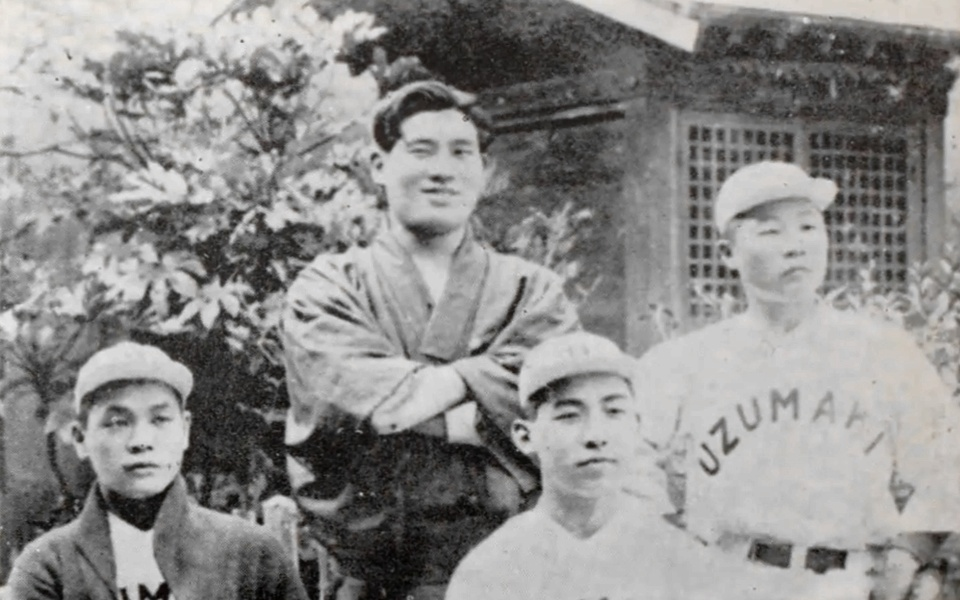
Inejiro Asanuma

The Builders' League (建設者同盟, Kensetsusha Dōmei) was a student movement organization formed in November 1919 (Taishō 8) centered around Waseda University. Along with the Shinjinkai at Tokyo Imperial University, it was one of the most prominent student groups during the era of Taishō democracy.

== Overview ==
At Waseda University, stimulated by the formation of the Shinjin-kai at Tokyo Imperial University at the end of 1918, the student group People's Alliance Society (Minjin Dōmeikai) was established in February 1919. However, internal conflicts arose over the recruitment of advisors. Members including Iwao Wada, Inejiro Asanuma, Ryūichi Inamura, Shōichi Miyake, and Teruaki Tadokoro withdrew from the People's Alliance Society. In November of the same year, with Shinjiro Kitazawa (a professor at Waseda University) as advisor, they formed the Builders' League.

Compared to the People's Alliance Society, which gradually became more radical after the split, the Builders' League maintained a relatively moderate ideological stance at the time of its founding. In August 1920, although central figure Iwao Wada participated as a founder of the Japan Socialist League (a grand unification of various socialist factions), the group's main activity remained enlightenment-oriented. They held regular study meetings twice a month, inviting prominent lecturers such as Ikuo Oyama, Hitoshi Yamakawa, Kikue Yamakawa, and Sakae Osugi.

Over time students from other universities, including Tokyo Imperial University, Keio University, and Meiji University—joined, turning it into a cross-university organization.

In October 1922 the Builders' League launched its official journal Kensetsusha (The Builder). The following month it affiliated with the newly founded Student Federation (Gakusei Rengōkai). Around this period advisor Kitazawa reportedly advised: "The Yūaikai (Friendly Society labor organization) is controlled by the Tokyo University group (= Shinjin-kai), so we should launch a peasant movement." Influenced by this suggestion, the group gradually shifted from a research and enlightenment society toward one actively engaged in political practice, with a focus on agricultural and peasant issues.

In autumn 1922 it played a leading role in the establishment of the Kantō regional alliance of the Japan Farmers' Union and contributed to the leftward radicalization of Nichinō. In spring 1923 the on-campus "Cultural Alliance" was founded at Waseda, after which the Builders' League was reorganized into a socialist group primarily composed of non-students. Core members such as Asanuma, Miyake, Inamura, and Rikizō Hirano emerged as important leaders in the peasant movement.

However, from 1926 onward, as factional divisions intensified during the movement to form a proletarian party, ideological conflicts also appeared within the Builders' League. In December 1926, Miyake, Asanuma and others withdrew from the left-leaning Labour-Farmer Party, which had been established as a unified proletarian party, and instead helped found the more centrist Japan Labour-Farmer Party. This event triggered the dissolution of the Builders' League.

== Official journals ==
The official journal Kensetsusha, first published in October 1922, continued until the December 1923 issue. It was later renamed several times:

- Youth Movement (February 1924 – July 1925)
- Proletarian Class (September 1925 – September 1926)
- Proletarian Peasants (October–December 1926)

Publication continued under these titles until the group's dissolution.

These journals were reprinted between 1970 and 1972 as part of the series Nihon Shakai Undō Shiryō – Kikan Shishi Hen (Materials on the History of Japanese Social Movements: Periodical Section), edited by the Ohara Institute for Social Research at Hosei University, with an explanatory introduction ("Kaidai") by Fumito Kanda, and published by Hosei University Press.

In addition to the journals, the group also issued the Kensetsusha Pamphlet series, including Toshihiko Sakai's Outline of Socialist Theory.

== See also ==
- Student movements in Japan
- Waseda University Military Research Group Incident
