= Shōichi Miyake =

Japanese peasant movement activist and politician

- 三宅 正一
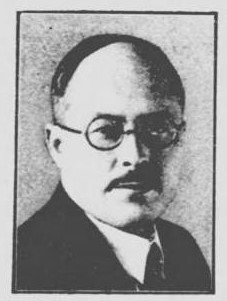
- Miyake in 1942

Vice Speaker of the House of Representatives
- In office 24 December 1976 – 7 September 1979
- Speaker: Shigeru Hori; Hirokichi Nadao
- Preceded by: Daisuke Akita
- Succeeded by: Haruo Okada

Member of the House of Representatives
- In office 21 February 1936 – 18 December 1945
- Constituency: Niigata 3rd
- In office 23 January 1949 – 23 October 1963
- Constituency: Niigata 2nd Niigata 3rd
- In office 30 January 1967 – 19 May 1980

Personal details
- Born: November 28, 1900 Akechi, Ena District, Gifu Prefecture, Japan (now Ena)
- Died: May 23, 1982 (aged 81)
- Party: Japan Socialist Party
- Other political affiliations: Labour-Farmer Party; Japan Labour-Farmer Party; Social Masses Party; Independent; Gokoku Dōshikai; Rightist Socialist Party
- Education: Waseda University (Faculty of Political Science and Economics)

Shōichi Miyake (三宅 正一, Miyake Shōichi, 28 November 1900 – 23 May 1982) was a Japanese peasant movement activist and politician who served as Vice Speaker of the House of Representatives from 1976 to 1979.

== Biography ==
Miyake was born in Akechi, Ena District, Gifu Prefecture (present-day Ena), on 28 November 1900. (Note: New Revised Biographical Dictionary of Politicians: Meiji to Shōwa (『新訂 政治家人名事典 明治～昭和』), p. 600, gives the date as 30 October.) His father was a local notable who served as village mayor. His younger brother, Torazō Miyake, opened an ophthalmology clinic in Nagoya and was the husband of the poet Chiyo Miyake. He attended the former Gifu Middle School (now Gifu Prefectural Gifu High School) and then entered the Faculty of Political Science and Economics at Waseda University. At Waseda he joined the student proletarian movement group Kensetsusha Dōmei (Builders' League). A classmate was Rikizō Hirano (later Minister of Agriculture and Forestry).

He graduated from Waseda in 1923. The following year he opened a Niigata Prefecture branch office of the Kantō League of the Japan Farmers' Union in Shibata and settled permanently in Niigata Prefecture. In 1926 he led the Kizaki Village tenancy dispute (Kizaki Village is now part of Kita Ward, Niigata City). The dispute began when landlords responded to tenants' demands for rent reductions by prohibiting entry to the land. Miyake organized a non-payment alliance, school boycotts by tenants' children, village political reform, and the establishment of a proletarian farmers' school. The dispute was settled by compromise in 1930; although tenants' cultivation rights were not formally recognized, subsequent court decisions became more favorable to tenants.

Also in 1926 he participated in the founding of the Labour-Farmer Party and became a central executive committee member. Amid the subsequent left-right split he left the party and, together with Hisashi Asō, Jusō Miwa and others, founded the Japan Labour-Farmer Party, again serving as a central executive committee member. Thereafter he was regarded as belonging to the "Nichirō" (Japan Labour-Farmer) faction. In 1932 he was elected to the Nagaoka City Council. In the 19th general election of 1936 he was first elected to the House of Representatives as a candidate of the Social Masses Party, and was subsequently elected a total of 15 times.

In the 1942 general election (the Yokusan election) he was elected without official recommendation and joined the Gokoku Dōshikai. The same year he became a director of the Japan Medical Corporation. After the war he participated in the founding of the Japan Socialist Party but was subject to the purge of public officials. After the purge was lifted he returned to the Diet in 1949 from the Niigata 2nd district. (Note: This was the only election in which he did not run from the Niigata 3rd district. List of the General Election of Members of the House of Representatives, 20th (衆議院議員総選挙一覧、第20回), p. 75) During the period of Socialist Party division he served as a leader of the Right Socialist Party and worked for the reunification of the left and right wings. He became vice-chairman of the party in 1968 and served as Vice Speaker of the House of Representatives from 1976 to 1979. He was defeated in the 36th general election of 1980 and retired from politics after a total of 37 years and 11 months in office.

Miyake died of heart failure on 23 May 1982 at the age of 81.

== Anecdotes ==
In the Niigata 3rd district he was a long-time rival of Kakuei Tanaka. Tanaka expanded his influence by winning over some of Miyake's (Japan Farmers' Union) supporters, but Miyake retained a solid base of support. During campaigning for the 34th general election after the Lockheed scandal, the two encountered each other; Miyake encouraged Tanaka to "take care of your health," while Tanaka praised Miyake, saying "Mr. Miyake is a benefactor of the farmers and must not be defeated. If he is defeated it will be a disgrace to the people of Niigata Prefecture."

On 24 November 1970 Miyake delivered the memorial address for Shōjirō Kawashima, Vice President of the Liberal Democratic Party, in a plenary session of the House of Representatives. Prime Minister Eisaku Satō recorded in his diary that the speech was "a fine piece of writing that moved the listeners."

From September 1970 he served as a member of the Operations Deliberation Committee of the Japan Sumo Association at the association's request.

== Works ==
- The True Facts of the Kizaki Incident (『木崎事件の真相』) (Proletarian Farmers’ School Pamphlet, Japan Farmers’ Union Tokyo Office, 1926)
- Rural Areas and the Youth Movement (『農村と青年運動』) (Shakai Hyōronsha, 1927)
- National Health Theory: National Health Insurance and Medical Policy (『国民保健論 国民健康保険と医療政策』) (edited by the National Medical Utilization Cooperative Association; Nisshinkaku Shoten, 1937)
- Crossing Many Mountains and Rivers: A History of the Social Movement Written with the Body (『幾山河を越えて からだで書いた社会運動史』) (Kōbunsha, 1966; Ōzorasha, 2000)
- History of the Japanese Social Movement in a Turbulent Period: The Trajectories of Toyohiko Kagawa, Hisashi Asō and Inejirō Asanuma (『激動期の日本社会運動史 賀川豊彦・麻生久・浅沼稲次郎の軌跡』) (Gendai Hyōronsha, 1973)
