= Yūto Yoshida =

Japanese politician

- 吉田 雄人
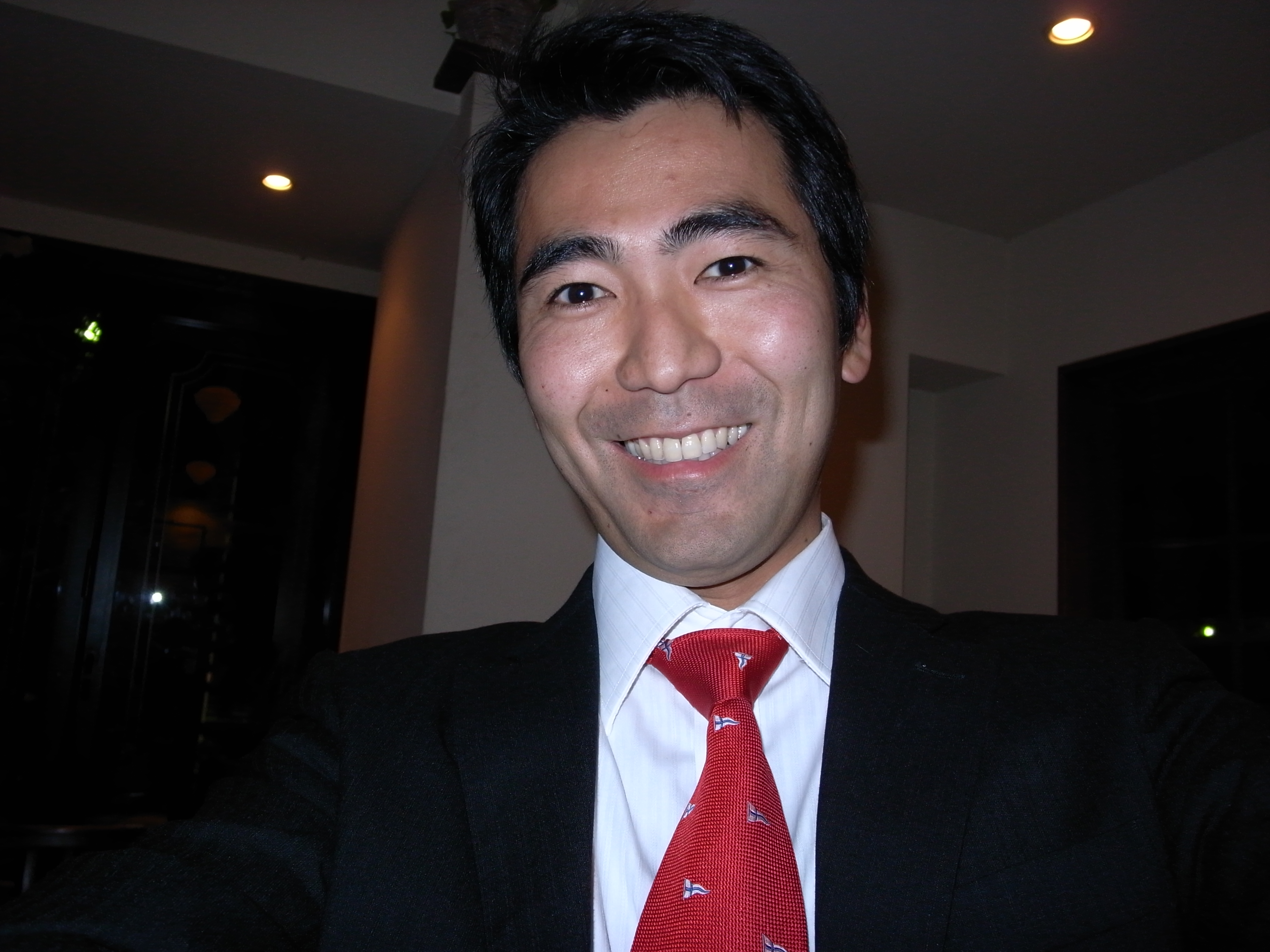

Mayor of Yokosuka
- In office 10 July 2009 – 9 July 2017
- Preceded by: Ryōichi Kabaya
- Succeeded by: Katsuaki Kamiji

Member of the Yokosuka City Council
- In office April 2003 – March 2009

Personal details
- Born: 3 December 1975 (age 50) Kita, Tokyo, Japan
- Party: Independent
- Education: Yokosuka High School
- Alma mater: Waseda University

Yūto Yoshida (吉田 雄人, Yoshida Yūto; born 3 December 1975) is a Japanese politician who served as mayor of Yokosuka, Kanagawa from 10 July 2009 to 9 July 2017.

== Early life ==
After graduating from Yokosuka High School in 1994 and Waseda University in 1999, Yoshida worked at Accenture for two years and then studied political science at graduate school.

== Political career ==
In 2003, Yoshida ran for Yokosuka's assembly election, in which he was the youngest candidate and won the most votes. He was reelected in 2007, gaining more votes than any other candidate again.

In the mayoral election held on 28 June 2009, Yoshida beat Ryōichi Kabaya, a former government official and the incumbent mayor backed by former Prime Minister Junichirō Koizumi and three major political parties. His victory, making him the first mayor of Yokosuka who has no bureaucratic background since 1973, was seen as a blow to the prospects for Shinjirō Koizumi, Junichirō Koizumi's second son, who planned to run for the upcoming national election.

Preceded by Ryōichi Kabaya	Mayor of Yokosuka; 10 July 2009 – 9 July 2017	Succeeded by Katsuaki Kamiji
