= The Road to Socialism in Japan =

Policy of the Japan Socialist Party, 1964–1986

The Road to Socialism in Japan (日本における社会主義への道, Nihon ni okeru shakai shugi e no michi) was a programmatic document of the Japan Socialist Party from 1964 to 1986. Commonly abbreviated within the party as "the Road" (Michi), it effectively replaced the 1955 compromise platform and defined the party's official line for more than two decades. Drafted by a Theory Committee established in 1962 under Mosaburō Suzuki and Seiichi Katsumata, the document analyzed Japanese capitalism as state-monopoly capitalism on the eve of socialist revolution and advocated a uniquely Japanese "peaceful revolution" through parliamentary majorities rather than violent upheaval. It called for socialization of the major means of production, a planned economy, active neutrality in foreign policy (including abrogation of the U.S.–Japan Security Treaty), and a transitional Socialist Party government, while taking a carefully worded stance on class rule that distanced itself from the Soviet and Chinese models of proletarian dictatorship. Strongly defended by the Japan Socialist Association and other left-wing currents, the Road marked the JSP as a revolutionary socialist party distinct from Western social democracy until it was relegated to historical status by the 1986 New Declaration.

== Background and formulation ==
The party platform adopted at the time of the 1955 merger of the Left and Right Socialist Parties was a compromise document, which left the left wing of the party strongly dissatisfied. Following the split of the Democratic Socialist Party, which strengthened the influence of the left wing, and the need to resolve policy disputes such as the structural reform debate, the 21st Regular Convention in January 1962 decided to establish a Theory Committee with Mosaburō Suzuki as chairman and Seiichi Katsumata as secretary-general. The Road to Socialism in Japan was the committee's report. Once approved by the party convention, it was treated in practice as a document replacing the party platform.

The document consists of two parts: Part I on the current situation in Japan, and Part II on the practical theory of the socialist movement. In reality, Part I served primarily as research material for Part II and was rarely used for discussion or study within the party. Generally, only Part II was referred to as The Road to Socialism in Japan. Part I was approved at the 23rd Party Convention in February 1964, Part II at the 24th Party Convention in December 1964, and it was revised and strengthened at the 27th Party Convention in January 1966.

== Content ==
- Inevitability of socialist revolution – Due to the advance of the socialist system, the struggles for national independence and liberation, and the accumulation of contradictions in capitalist countries, the capitalist system has reached a stage where it must yield to the socialist system.
- Character of Japanese capitalism – Japanese capitalism is state monopoly capitalism. The fundamental contradictions of capitalism have developed to the highest degree, placing Japan on the eve of socialist revolution.
- Critique of the welfare state – The theory of the "welfare state" is a measure by capital to prolong the capitalist system by preventing the people from choosing socialism. A true welfare state cannot be realized under capitalism.
- Principles and basic goals of socialism – Socialism abolishes the system in which humans exploit other humans and ultimately eliminates human alienation. Through the socialization of the major means of production and a planned economy, it raises productivity and guarantees a prosperous life for the people. It protects the people's fundamental human rights and establishes peaceful coexistence in international relations. In its initial stage, some form of class rule is inevitable, but the model of the "dictatorship of the proletariat" as seen in the Soviet Union or China is not necessary. This section was addressed at the 27th Convention, where it was clarified (not in the main text but in the "deliberation record") that class rule in Japan differs from that in the Soviet Union and China, but this is a difference in form and function, not in the essence of the dictatorship of the proletariat.
- Character of the Japanese revolution and the tasks of the Japan Socialist Party – The road to socialism in Japan is the road of Peaceful Revolution. It is not merely desirable; Japan objectively possesses the conditions for it, and the party will actively pursue it. The Japan Socialist Party, as the leading party of the socialist revolution, will win a democratic majority both inside and outside parliament and seize all power through parliament.
- Transitional government – This refers to a government established as a transitional step toward a socialist regime, called a "Socialist Party government." Its basic character is constitutional defense, democracy, and neutrality. While a single-party Socialist government is the basic form, extra-cabinet cooperation with other factions or coalition governments are also possible.
- Foreign policy and international solidarity – The Japan Socialist Party's foreign policy is active neutrality. Immediate tasks include dissolving the U.S.-Japan Security Treaty, reorganizing the Japan Self-Defense Forces into a National Police Force and a Peaceful National Construction Force, and working toward the establishment of a nuclear-free zone in the Asia-Pacific region. The party seeks international solidarity with socialist parties in capitalist countries and the Socialist International, non-aligned countries such as India, and socialist countries such as the Soviet Union and China.

== Influence ==
Although the Socialist Association played a major role in drafting the document, The Road to Socialism in Japan contained elements of a detailed "blueprint," including descriptions of the transitional process to socialism and the significance of bourgeois democracy. It was initially viewed by some as relatively close to the structural reform faction. However, after the late 1960s, when the Eda faction and other right-wing elements abandoned the revolutionary aspects of structural reform theory, "the Road" came to be regarded as the document that defined the Japan Socialist Party as a socialist party aiming for socialist revolution, distinct from Western social democracy parties. The Socialist Association and other left-wing groups actively defended it and used it as a basis for strong criticism of the right wing.

After the right wing gradually gained leadership following the 1977 regulation of the Association, calls to review "the Road" emerged, leading to fierce debates with the left wing. These disputes were resolved in 1986 with the adoption of the New Declaration of the Japan Socialist Party, which treated "the Road" and similar documents as historical. This also marked the end of left-wing dominance within the party since the Morito–Inamura dispute of 1949.

== Evaluation ==
The Socialist Association and former left-wing members of the party continue to highly evaluate "the Road" today. In contrast, many political scientists outside the party view it negatively, arguing that it hindered the Socialist Party from adapting to the new social conditions of the high-growth era. It has also been pointed out that, being a product of compromise between various factions, the document contains eclecticism, ambiguity, wordiness, and some expressions that are awkward in Japanese.

== See also ==
- Japan Socialist Party
- Japan Socialist Association
