= Japan Socialist Party Platform (1955) =

1955–1986 platform of the Japan Socialist Party

The Unified Socialist Party Platform (Japanese: 統一社会党綱領, romanized: Tōitsu Shakaitō Kōryō), officially known as the Japan Socialist Party Platform (Japanese: 日本社会党綱領, romanized: Nihon Shakaitō Kōryō), was the official party platform of the Japan Socialist Party (JSP) from its reunification in 1955 until 1986. Commonly referred to as the “so-called Unified Socialist Party Platform,” it was a compromise document between the Marxist-oriented Left Socialist Platform of 1954 and the more democratic-socialist draft of the Right. Adopted at the unification congress on 13 October 1955, it committed the party to a democratic and peaceful socialist revolution, the inseparability of socialism and democracy, full national independence, and rejection of both capitalism/imperialism and communist one-party dictatorship. It remained the formal ideological foundation of the JSP throughout the 1955 System era, though it was frequently criticized by the left wing as insufficiently revolutionary, paving the way for the more explicitly Marxist The Road to Socialism in Japan (1964–66). It was finally relegated to historical status by the New Declaration of the Japan Socialist Party in January 1986.

== History of adoption ==
After the 1951 split of the Japan Socialist Party into Left and Right factions over the Treaty of San Francisco and the U.S.–Japan Security Treaty, each side developed its own programmatic documents. The Left adopted the Left Socialist Platform in 1954, while the Right prepared a draft known as the Right Socialist Platform (Unified Socialist Party Platform Draft) in May 1955.

Negotiations for reunification intensified in 1955. Talks on a joint platform began in May, and a compromise draft was finalized in early September. On 13 October 1955, at the unification congress held at Kyoritsu Auditorium in Tokyo (formally the 12th National Party Congress), the Left and Right Socialist Parties reunified and formally adopted the new platform, along with new party rules and a policy outline. Mosaburō Suzuki (from the Left) became chairman and Inejirō Asanuma (from the Right) became secretary-general.

The platform remained the official programmatic document of the Japan Socialist Party for more than thirty years, until it was superseded by the New Declaration of the Japan Socialist Party in January 1986.

== Characteristics ==
The Unified Socialist Party Platform was a compromise document between the more Marxist-oriented Left Socialist Platform and the democratic-socialist Right Socialist Platform. Key characteristics include:

- Explicit commitment to democratic and peaceful socialist revolution, rejecting both capitalism/imperialism and communism.
- Strong emphasis on parliamentary democracy, freedom, human dignity, and the inseparability of socialism and democracy (“Socialism is achieved through democracy, and democracy is completed under socialism”).
- Analysis of postwar Japan as a highly developed monopoly-capitalist country that had undergone significant democratization under occupation policies, while still facing incomplete independence and the need for full national independence.
- Positioning of the Japan Socialist Party as a member of both the Socialist International and the Asian Socialist Conference, with a special historical mission to serve as a bridge between Asian and European socialism.
- Rejection of communist methods (one-party dictatorship, suppression of individuality and freedom) while affirming socialism as a world movement advancing through democratic means.

It is generally regarded as more moderate and eclectic than the Left Socialist Platform of 1954, reflecting the need for unity between the two factions.

== Content ==
The platform consists of a preamble followed by four chapters (the primary online source reproduces the preamble and the beginning of Chapter 1; the complete text is contained in the 1978 collection of party platform documents).

=== Preamble ===
The preamble surveys the historical development of capitalism from the abolition of feudalism through the rise of monopoly capital, imperialism, the two world wars, and the postwar division of the world into capitalist and communist camps. It criticizes both the exploitative nature of capitalism and the undemocratic character of communism (one-party rule, suppression of freedom and human dignity). It affirms that socialism is achieved through democracy and that democracy is completed under socialism. It notes the postwar growth of the socialist movement worldwide, the re-establishment of the Socialist International (1951) and the founding of the Asian Socialist Conference (1953), and assigns the Japan Socialist Party a special role as a bridge between Asian and European socialism. It concludes with a pledge to overcome communism, carry out a democratic and peaceful socialist revolution, achieve complete national independence, and uphold the platform.

=== Chapter 1: The Current Situation of Japan ===
This chapter analyzes Japan’s path from the Meiji Restoration through monopoly capitalism, fascism, and defeat in World War II. It describes the postwar occupation democratization measures (dissolution of the military, purge, labor laws, land reform, zaibatsu dissolution, new Constitution, etc.) as historically significant steps that strengthened the working class and created the basis for further advance toward socialism. It situates Japan within the global confrontation of the two camps while noting the emergence of non-aligned forces seeking peace through the United Nations and disarmament.

(Subsequent chapters address the path to socialism, the character of the party, and concrete tasks; full details are available in the 1978 documentary collection 日本社会党綱領文献集.)

== Influence ==
As the official platform of the reunified Japan Socialist Party from 1955 to 1986, the Unified Socialist Party Platform provided the formal ideological foundation of the party during the height of the 1955 System. It was frequently criticized by the left wing (especially the Socialist Association) as too compromise-oriented and insufficiently revolutionary, which contributed to the later adoption of the more explicitly Marxist-oriented programmatic document The Road to Socialism in Japan (“The Road”) in 1964–66. Conversely, the right wing regarded it as a necessary basis for broad unity.

The platform was formally relegated to the status of a historical document by the New Declaration of the Japan Socialist Party adopted in January 1986, which explicitly stated that the founding platform, the Unified Platform, and “The Road” had become historical documents in light of changes in the times and the party’s own progress.

== See also ==
- Japan Socialist Party Platform (1945)
- Left Socialist Party Platform (Japan)
- Right Socialist Party Platform (Japan)
- The Road to Socialism in Japan
- New Declaration of the Japan Socialist Party
- Japan Socialist Party
- Japan Socialist Association
