= Murayama cabinet =

Cabinet of Japan (1994–1995)

Murayama Cabinet
- 81st Cabinet of Japan

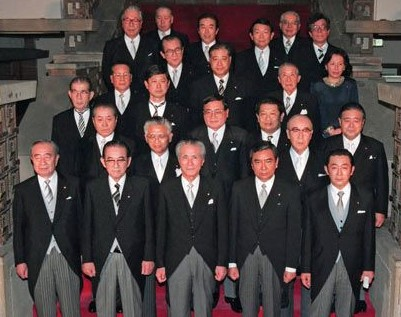
- Prime Minister Tomiichi Murayama (front row, centre) with his newly-elected cabinet inside the Kantei, June 30, 1994
- Date formed: June 30, 1994
- Date dissolved: August 8, 1995

People and organisations
- Head of state: Emperor Akihito
- Head of government: Tomiichi Murayama
- Deputy head of government: Yōhei Kōno (1994-95); Ryutaro Hashimoto (1995-96)
- Member party: Liberal Democratic Party; Japan Socialist Party; New Party Sakigake
- Status in legislature: HoR: Majority coalition HoC: Majority coalition
- Opposition party: Japan Renewal Party (1994); New Frontier Party (1994-96); Democratic Reform Party; Japanese Communist Party
- Opposition leader: Tsutomu Hata (1994); Toshiki Kaifu (1994-95); Ichirō Ozawa (1995-96)

History
- Election: 1995 councillors election
- Predecessor: Hata Cabinet
- Successor: First Hashimoto Cabinet (Reshuffle)

The Murayama Cabinet (村山内閣, Murayama naikaku) governed Japan under the leadership of Prime Minister Tomiichi Murayama from 1994 until a 1995 Cabinet reshuffle. Murayama was elected prime minister by the National Diet on 29 June 1994 after the threat of a no-confidence vote had brought down the previous minority Hata Cabinet. Murayama's and his cabinet's formal investiture by the Emperor took place one day later.

The coalition cabinet consisted of 13 Liberal Democrats, six Socialists (including the Prime Minister) and two members of New Party Sakigake. All ministers were members of the Diet, the only woman in the cabinet was science and technology minister Makiko Tanaka.

The government lasted until January 5, 1996, when Murayama announced his resignation. The 3-party coalition continued under LDP leadership with Deputy Prime Minister Ryutaro Hashimoto becoming the new prime minister on January 11.

== Election of the prime minister ==
The decision by the LDP to support the leader of their traditional rival, the Socialists, for prime minister caused a split in party ranks. Former LDP Prime Minister Toshiki Kaifu announced that he was leaving the party and was put forward by the anti-LDP coalition parties led by Tsutomu Hata and Ichirō Ozawa as their candidate for prime minister when the vote was held on June 29.

29 June 1994 Absolute majority (256/511) required
House of Representatives
Choice	First Vote
Choice	Votes
Tomiichi Murayama	241 / 511
Toshiki Kaifu	220 / 511
Tetsuzo Fuwa	15 / 511
Yohei Kono	5 / 511
Blank Ballot	23 / 511
Abstentions (Including Speaker and Deputy)	7 / 511
Source Political Data: Japanese Politics 1994

Since no candidate gained an absolute majority in the first round, a runoff vote between Murayama and Kaifu was held later the same day, with Murayama being elected with the support of the Japan Socialist Party, New Party Sakigake and the majority of the LDP.

29 June 1994 Simple majority required
House of Representatives
Choice	Runoff Vote
Choice	Votes
Tomiichi Murayama	261 / 511
Toshiki Kaifu	214 / 511
Blank Ballot	29 / 511
Abstentions (Including Speaker and Deputy)	7 / 511
Source Political Data: Japanese Politics 1994

== List of ministers ==
Socialist
Liberal Democratic
New Party Sakigake
Independent
R = Member of the House of Representatives
C = Member of the House of Councillors

=== Cabinet ===
Murayama Cabinet from 30 June 1994 to 8 August 1995
Portfolio	Minister	Term of office	Diet membership	
Prime Minister	Tomiichi Murayama	June 30, 1994 - January 11, 1996	R	Ōita 1
Deputy Prime Minister	Yōhei Kōno	June 30, 1994 - October 2, 1995	R	Kanagawa 3
Minister of Foreign Affairs	Yōhei Kōno	June 30, 1994 - January 11, 1996	R	Kanagawa 3
Minister of Justice	Isao Maeda	June 30, 1994 - August 8, 1995	C	Wakayama
Minister of Finance	Masayoshi Takemura	June 30, 1994 - January 11, 1996	R	Shiga at-large
Minister of Education	Kaoru Yosano	June 30, 1994 - August 8, 1995	R	Tokyo 1
Minister of Welfare	Shōichi Ide	June 30, 1994 - August 8, 1995	R	Nagano 2
Minister of Agriculture	Taichirō Ōgawara	June 30, 1994 - August 8, 1995	C	national proportional
Minister of Trade and Industry	Ryūtarō Hashimoto	June 30, 1994 - January 11, 1996	R	Okayama 2
Minister of Transportation	Shizuka Kamei	June 30, 1994 - August 8, 1995	R	Hiroshima 3
Minister of Posts and Telecommunications	Shun Ōide	June 30, 1994 - August 8, 1995	R	Kanagawa 4
Minister of Labour	Mansō Hamamoto	June 30, 1994 - August 8, 1995	C	Hiroshima
Minister of Construction	Koken Nosaka	June 30, 1994 - August 8, 1995	R	Tottori at-large
Minister of Home Affairs; Chairman of the National Public Safety Commission	Hiromu Nonaka	June 30, 1994 - August 8, 1995	R	Kyoto 2
Chief Cabinet Secretary	Kōzō Igarashi	June 30, 1994 - August 8, 1995	R	Hokkaidō 2
Director of the Management and Coordination Agency	Tsuruo Yamaguchi	June 30, 1994 - August 8, 1995	R	Gunma 3
Director of the Hokkaidō Development Agency; Director of the Okinawa Development Agency	Sadatoshi Ozato	June 30, 1994 - January 20, 1995	R	Kagoshima 2
Director of the Hokkaidō Development Agency; Director of the Okinawa Development Agency	Kiyoshi Ozawa	January 20, 1995 - August 8, 1995	R	Tokyo 7
Director of the Defense Agency	Masahiko Kōmura	June 30, 1994 - August 8, 1995	R	Yamaguchi 2
Director of the Economic Planning Agency	Tokuichirō Tamazawa	June 30, 1994 - August 8, 1995	R	Iwate 1
Director of the Science and Technology Agency	Makiko Tanaka	June 30, 1994 - August 8, 1995	R	Niigata 3
Director of the Environment Agency	Shin Sakurai	June 30, 1994 - August 14, 1994	R	Niigata 3
Director of the Environment Agency	Sōhei Miyashita	August 14, 1994 - August 8, 1995	R	Nagano 3
Director of the National Land Agency	Kiyoshi Ozawa	June 30, 1994 - August 8, 1995	R	Tokyo 7
Minister of State (Disaster management)	Sadatoshi Ozato	January 20, 1995 - August 8, 1995	R	Kagoshima 2

==== Changes ====
- August 14, 1994 - Environment Minister Shin Sakurai resigned after making controversial statements related to Japan's role in the Second World War and was replaced with Sohei Miyashita
- January 20, 1995 - Sadatoshi Ozato was moved to become the Minister of State for Disaster Management in response to the Great Hanshin earthquake, and was replaced as minister for Okinawa and Hokkaido development by Kiyoshi Ozawa.

==== Other positions ====
Deputy Chief Cabinet Secretaries	Hiroyuki Sonoda	NPH	HR, Kumamoto 2
Deputy Chief Cabinet Secretaries	Nobuo Ishihara (until 24 February 1995)	–	–
Deputy Chief Cabinet Secretaries	Teijirō Furukawa (from 24 February 1995)	–	–
Legislation Bureau	Takao Ōde	–	–

=== Reshuffled cabinet ===
Murayama Cabinet (Reshuffle)
- 81st Cabinet of Japan

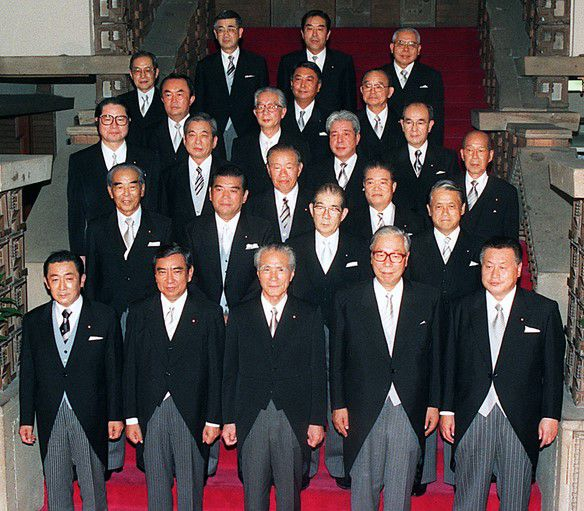
- Prime Minister Tomiichi Murayama (front row, centre) and his reshuffled cabinet at the Kantei, August 8, 1995
- Date formed: August 8, 1995
- Date dissolved: January 11, 1996

People and organisations
- Head of state: Emperor Akihito
- Head of government: Tomiichi Murayama
- Deputy head of government: Yōhei Kōno (1994-95); Ryutaro Hashimoto (1995-96)
- Member party: LDP–Socialist–New Party Sakigake Coalition
- Status in legislature: Coalition majority
- Opposition party: Japan Renewal Party (1994); New Frontier Party (1994-96)
- Opposition leader: Tsutomu Hata (1994); Toshiki Kaifu (1994-95); Ichirō Ozawa (1995-96)

History
- Election: 1995 councillors election
- Predecessor: Murayama Cabinet
- Successor: First Hashimoto Cabinet

Murayama Cabinet from 8 August 1995 to January 11, 1996
Portfolio	Minister	Term of Office	Diet membership	
Prime Minister	Tomiichi Murayama	June 30, 1994 - January 11, 1996	R	Ōita 1
Deputy Prime Minister	Yōhei Kōno	June 30, 1994 - October 2, 1995	R	Kanagawa 3
Deputy Prime Minister	Ryūtarō Hashimoto	October 2, 1995 - January 11, 1996	R	Okayama 2
Minister of Foreign Affairs	Yōhei Kōno	June 30, 1994 - January 11, 1996	R	Kanagawa 3
Minister of Justice	Tomoharu Tazawa	August 8, 1995 - October 9, 1995	C	National Proportional
Minister of Justice	Hiroshi Miyazawa	October 9, 1995 - January 11, 1996	C	Hiroshima
Minister of Finance	Masayoshi Takemura	June 30, 1994 - January 11, 1996	R	Shiga At-large
Minister of Education	Yoshinobu Shimamura	August 8, 1995 - January 11, 1996	R	Tokyo 10th
Minister of Welfare	Tadayoshi Morii	August 8, 1995 - January 11, 1996	R	Hiroshima 2nd
Minister of Agriculture	Hosei Norota	August 8, 1995 - January 11, 1996	R	Akita 1st
Minister of Trade and Industry	Ryūtarō Hashimoto	June 30, 1994 - January 11, 1996	R	Okayama 2nd
Minister of Transportation	Takeo Hiranuma	August 8, 1995 - January 11, 1996	R	Okayama 1st
Minister of Posts and Telecommunications	Issei Inoue	August 8, 1995 - January 11, 1996	R	Osaka 3rd
Minister of Labour	Shinji Aoki	August 8, 1995 - January 11, 1996	C	Shizuoka
Minister of Construction	Yoshirō Mori	August 8, 1995 - January 11, 1996	R	Ishikawa 1st
Minister of Home Affairs; Chairman of the National Public Safety Commission	Takashi Fukaya	August 8, 1995 - January 11, 1996	R	Tokyo 8th
Chief Cabinet Secretary; Minister for Disaster Relief and Reconstruction	Koken Nosaka	August 8, 1995 - January 11, 1996	R	Tottori At-large
Director of the Management and Coordination Agency	Takami Eto	August 8, 1995 - November 13, 1995	R	Miyazaki 1st
Director of the Management and Coordination Agency	Masateru Nakayama	November 13 - January 11, 1996	R	Osaka 2nd
Director of the Hokkaidō Development Agency; Director of the Okinawa Development Agency	Masaaki Takagi	August 8, 1995 - January 11, 1996	C	Hokkaidō
Director of the Defense Agency	Seishiro Etō	August 8, 1995 - January 11, 1996	R	Oita 1st
Director of the Economic Planning Agency	Isamu Miyazaki	August 8, 1995 - January 11, 1996	-	Not in the Diet
Director of the Science and Technology Agency	Yasuoki Urano	August 8, 1995 - January 11, 1996	R	Aichi 4th
Director of the Environment Agency	Tadamori Oshima	August 8, 1995 - January 11, 1996	R	Aomori 1st
Director of the National Land Agency	Seiichi Ikehata	August 8, 1995 - January 11, 1996	R	Hokkaido 4th

==== Changes ====
- October 2 - Following the 1995 LDP Leadership election Ryutaro Hashimoto became LDP President and replaced Yōhei Kōno as deputy prime minister. Both retained their ministerial portfolios.
- October 9 - Justice minister Tomoharu Tazawa resigned following a campaign finance scandal, and was replaced by Hiroshi Miyazawa.
- November 13 - Takami Eto resigned as Director of the Management and Co-ordination agency following controversial remarks about the treatment of conquered peoples during the Second World War, and was replaced by Masateru Nakayama.
