= Yoshirō Mori =

Prime Minister of Japan from 2000 to 2001

Yoshiro Mori
- 森 喜朗
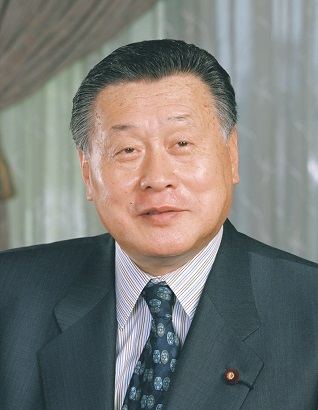
- Official portrait, 2000

Prime Minister of Japan
- In office 5 April 2000 – 26 April 2001
- Monarch: Akihito
- Preceded by: Keizō Obuchi; Mikio Aoki (acting)
- Succeeded by: Junichiro Koizumi

President of the Liberal Democratic Party
- In office 5 April 2000 – 24 April 2001
- Secretary-General: Hiromu Nonaka; Makoto Koga
- Preceded by: Keizō Obuchi
- Succeeded by: Junichiro Koizumi

President of the Tokyo Organising Committee of the Olympic and Paralympic Games
- In office 24 January 2014 – 18 February 2021
- IOC President: Thomas Bach
- Preceded by: Carlos Nuzman (Rio 2016)
- Succeeded by: Seiko Hashimoto
Ministerial offices
Minister of Construction
In office 8 August 1995 – 11 January 1996
Prime Minister	Tomiichi Murayama
Preceded by	Koken Nosaka
Succeeded by	Eiichi Nakao
Minister of International Trade and Industry
In office 12 December 1992 – 20 July 1993
Prime Minister	Kiichi Miyazawa
Preceded by	Kozo Watanabe
Succeeded by	Hiroshi Kumagai
Minister of Education
In office 27 December 1983 – 1 November 1984
Prime Minister	Yasuhiro Nakasone
Preceded by	Mitsuo Setoyama
Succeeded by	Hikaru Matsunaga
Deputy Chief Cabinet Secretary (Political affairs)
In office 28 November 1977 – 7 December 1978
Prime Minister	Takeo Fukuda
Preceded by	Masajuro Shiokawa
Succeeded by	Koichi Kato
Party political offices
Secretary-General of the Liberal Democratic Party
In office July 1998 – 5 April 2000
President	Keizō Obuchi
Preceded by	Koichi Kato
Succeeded by	Hiromu Nonaka
In office July 1993 – August 1995
President	Yōhei Kōno
Vice President	Keizō Obuchi (1994–1995)
Preceded by	Seiroku Kajiyama
Succeeded by	Hiroshi Mitsuzuka

Member of the House of Representatives from Ishikawa
- In office 28 December 1969 – 16 November 2012
- Preceded by: Eiichi Sakata
- Succeeded by: Hajime Sasaki
- Constituency: 1st district (1969–1996); 2nd district (1996–2012)

Personal details
- Born: 14 July 1937 (age 89) Nomi, Ishikawa, Empire of Japan
- Party: Liberal Democratic (Seiwakai)
- Spouse: Chieko Maki (m. 1961)
- Children: Yūki Mori; Yoko Fujimoto
- Parent: Shigeki Mori (father)
- Education: Waseda University (BBA)
- Website: Yoshiro Mori WebSite

Yoshirō Mori (Japanese: 森 喜朗, Hepburn: Mori Yoshirō; born 14 July 1937) is a Japanese politician who served as Prime Minister of Japan and President of the Liberal Democratic Party from 2000 to 2001.

Born in present-day Nomi, Ishikawa, Japan, Mori worked as a journalist before entering politics. In 1969, he was elected to the House of Representatives for the Ishikawa 2nd district. He served in government as education minister in 1983 and 1984, international trade and industry minister in 1992 and 1993, and construction minister in 1995 and 1996, and later became secretary general of the Liberal Democratic Party (LDP). After Keizō Obuchi suffered a stroke and cerebral hemorrhage on 2 April 2000 and was unable to continue in office, Mori became president of the LDP and prime minister, weeks before Obuchi's death.

Media coverage of Mori's term as prime minister was dominated by his gaffes and undiplomatic comments, which led to him becoming unpopular in opinion polls. (Note: See:) Members of his cabinet resigned due to fundraising scandals, which also contributed to his unpopularity. In November 2000, with Mori's approval ratings below 30%, opposition politicians attempted to win a vote of no confidence against Mori by soliciting support from rebels within the LDP, although this was quashed after LDP politicians who voted for the measure were threatened with expulsion. Towards the end of Mori's term, his approval rating dropped to single digits. In April 2001, Mori officially announced his intention to resign. Junichiro Koizumi won the subsequent LDP leadership election and became prime minister on 26 April 2001.

After resigning as prime minister, Mori remained a member of the House of Representatives until announcing in July 2012 that he would not stand in the 2012 general election. He remained an important player in Russo-Japanese relations due to his close personal relationship with Vladimir Putin. Following his premiership, Mori served as the President of the Japan Rugby Football Union as well as the Japan-Korea Parliamentarians' Union. In 2014, he was appointed to head the organizing committee for the 2020 Summer Olympics and Paralympics, but resigned ahead of the games' opening following gaffes made at a committee meeting that were perceived as sexist. In 2003, Mori received the highest distinction of the Scout Association of Japan, the Golden Pheasant Award.

== Early life and education ==
Yoshiro Mori was born in present-day Nomi, Ishikawa, Japan, as the son of Shigeki and Kaoru Mori, wealthy rice farmers with a history in politics, as both his father and grandfather served as the mayor of Neagari, Ishikawa Prefecture. His mother died when Yoshiro was seven years old. He studied at the Waseda University in Tokyo, joining the rugby union club. He developed a passion for the sport but was never a high-level player; he once compared rugby to his relationship with other parties in the ruling coalition by stating: "In rugby, one person doesn't become a star, one person plays for all, and all play for one."

After university, Mori joined the Sankei Shimbun, a conservative newspaper in Japan.

== Political career ==
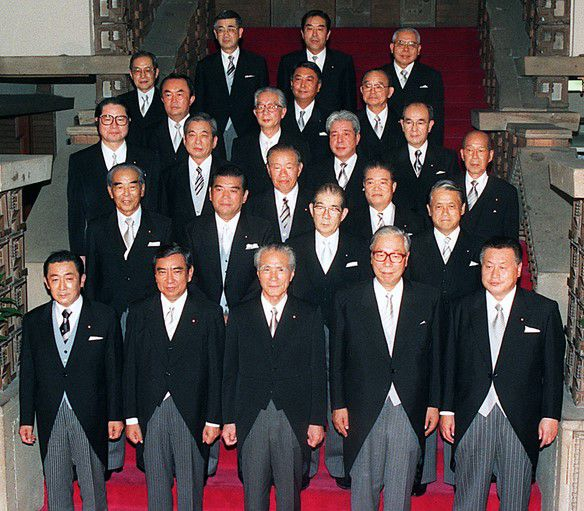
Mori with members of Murayama Reshuffled Cabinet (at the Prime Minister's Official Residence on 8 August 1995)

In 1962, Mori left the newspaper and became secretary of a Diet member, and in the 1969 general election, he was elected in the lower house at age 32. He was reelected 10 consecutive times. In 1980, he was involved in the Recruit scandal about receiving unlisted shares of Recruit (company) before they were publicly traded, and selling them after they were made public for a profit of approximately 1 million dollars.

Mori was education minister in 1983 and 1984, international trade and industry minister in 1992 and 1993, and construction minister in 1995 and 1996.

In 1999, Mori began to assume control of the Mitsuzuka faction (formerly Abe faction) that had been headed by Hiroshi Mitsuzuka in the Liberal Democratic Party (LDP).

== Prime minister ==
In the midst of a battle with Liberal Party leader Ichirō Ozawa, Prime Minister Keizō Obuchi suffered a stroke and cerebral hemorrhage on 2 April 2000 and was unable to continue in office. The Cabinet held an emergency meeting and resigned en masse. Mori, who was the secretary general of the Liberal Democratic Party (LDP), was unanimously elected president, and became prime minister with the votes of the LDP, New Komeito and New Conservative Party (composed of members who left Ozawa's party on 3 April). Mori announced that he would keep Obuchi's cabinet in place. His government further supported the foreign policies of his predecessor.

=== Gaffes ===
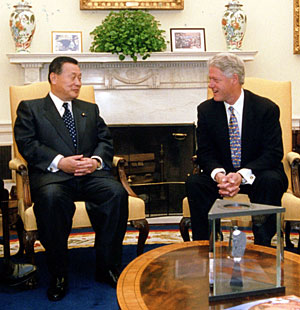
Mori meeting with U.S. President Bill Clinton in the White House on 5 May 2000

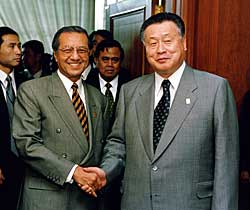
Mori shakes hands with Malaysian Prime Minister Mahathir Mohamad on 25 November 2000.

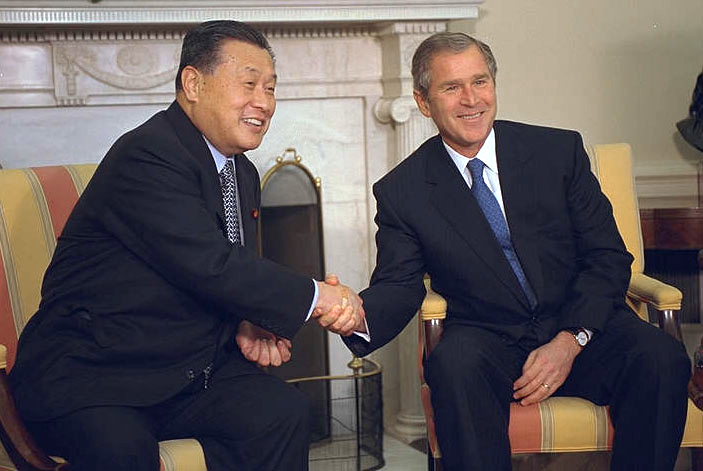
Mori meeting with U.S. President George W. Bush in the White House on 19 March 2001

The media coverage of Mori's term as prime minister was dominated by his gaffes and undiplomatic comments. Even prior to his election as prime minister, he had been described in the Japanese media as having "the heart of a flea and the brain of a shark".

- In January 2000, he made a joke about his campaign in the 1969 election: "When I was greeting farmers from my car, they all went into their homes. I felt like I had AIDS."
- In February 2000, when asked about the Year 2000 problem in the United States, Mori quipped that "when there is a blackout, the murderers always come out. It's that type of society."
- At Obuchi's funeral, Mori failed to clap and bow properly before Obuchi's shrine, an important portion of a traditional Japanese funeral rite. The other world leaders present at the funeral, including then U.S. President Bill Clinton, performed the ritual correctly.
- At a meeting of Shinto followers in Tokyo in May 2000, Mori described Japan as "a divine nation (kami no kuni) with the Emperor at its center". This "divine nation statement" stirred controversy in Japan as it invoked the official interpretation of the Emperor as a divine entity during the days of the Empire of Japan. Days after this statement, Mori questioned whether the Japan Communist Party could "ensure Japan's security and defend the kokutai", using a term for Japan's unity with its divine emperor which had not been in common use since World War II.
- During the June 2000 election, when asked about recent newspaper reports that showed that roughly half of the voters still had not decided for whom to vote, he replied that they could "stay in bed for the day".
- In October 2000, during a dialogue with British prime minister Tony Blair, Mori stated that the Japanese government had suggested in 1997 that Japanese nationals believed to be abducted by North Korea be arranged to be "found" elsewhere in order to ensure a smooth normalization of the relation between North Korea and Japan, which upset the foreign ministry and led to calls for Mori's resignation from conservative voices within the LDP.
- In December 2000, pictures appeared in the weekly magazine Shukan Gendai showing him drinking in an Osaka bar with a high-ranking yakuza.
- In February 2001, the US submarine USS Greeneville accidentally hit and sank the Japanese fishing ship Ehime Maru during an emergency surface drill on 9 February 2001, resulting in nine dead students and teachers. Mori continued a round of golf after being told of the incident, for which he was criticized as being politically tone-deaf.
- One unsubstantiated story concerned the 26th G8 summit in 2000, at which upon meeting U.S. President Bill Clinton, Mori was to say "How are you". Instead, he allegedly slipped up and said "Who are you;" Clinton answered "Well, I'm Hillary Clinton's husband", to which Mori replied "Me too". Snopes.com reported that this was obviously a low-quality fabrication/joke and that the same story had been told about Kim Young-sam several months earlier. It was nonetheless reported by some mainstream media outlets such as the Australian Broadcasting Corporation.

=== Resignation ===
Two senior Mori appointees resigned due to fundraising scandals in August 2000. Mori's disapproval rating neared 60% following these resignations.

In November 2000, with Mori's approval ratings below 30%, opposition politicians attempted to win a vote of no confidence against Mori by soliciting support from rebels within the LDP, guided by Koichi Kato in the so-called "Kato's rebellion". Hiromu Nonaka, the secretary general of the party, quashed the potential revolt by threatening to expel any LDP politicians who voted for the measure. The vote failed 237 to 190. Nonaka resigned days later amid speculation that he would challenge Mori for leadership of the LDP.

Towards the end of Mori's term, his approval rating dropped to single digits. In March 2001, reports surfaced that Mori had told LDP leaders of his plans to resign. Although he denied the reports, they contributed to a massive drop in Japanese stock market prices early that week. On 6 April, he officially announced his intention to resign. Junichiro Koizumi won the subsequent LDP leadership election and became prime minister on 26 April 2001.

=== Cabinets ===
Mori appointed three cabinets. The third cabinet is officially referred to as a continuation of the second cabinet, as the changes came amid a major administrative realignment in January 2001 that eliminated several cabinet positions and renamed several key ministries.

Cabinets of Yoshiro Mori
	First Cabinet (April 2000)	Second Cabinet (July 2000)	Second Cabinet, Realigned (Jan. 2001)	
Chief Cabinet Secretary and Okinawa Development	Mikio Aoki	Yasuo Fukuda	Chief Cabinet Secretary	Yasuo Fukuda
Chief Cabinet Secretary and Okinawa Development	Mikio Aoki	Yasuo Fukuda	Administrative Reform, Okinawa and Northern Territories	Ryutaro Hashimoto
Foreign Affairs	Yōhei Kōno	Yōhei Kōno	Yōhei Kōno	
Justice	Hideo Usui	Okiharu Yasuoka	Masahiko Kōmura	
Finance	Kiichi Miyazawa	Kiichi Miyazawa	Kiichi Miyazawa	
Education	Hirofumi Nakasone	Tadamori Oshima	Nobutaka Machimura	
Health and Welfare	Yuya Niwa	Yūji Tsushima	Health, Labor and Welfare	Chikara Sakaguchi
Labor	Takamori Makino	Yoshio Yoshikawa	Health, Labor and Welfare	Chikara Sakaguchi
Agriculture, Forestry and Fisheries	Tokuichiro Tamazawa	Yoichi Tani	Yoshio Yatsu	
International Trade and Industry	Takashi Fukaya	Takeo Hiranuma	Economy, Trade and Industry	Takeo Hiranuma
Transport	Toshihiro Nikai	Hajime Morita	Land, Infrastructure and Transport	Chikage Oogi
Construction	Masaaki Nakayama	Chikage Oogi	Land, Infrastructure and Transport	Chikage Oogi
Home Affairs	Kosuke Hori	Mamoru Nishida	Public Management, Home Affairs, Posts and Telecommunications	Toranosuke Katayama
Posts and Telecommunications	Eita Yashiro	Kozo Hirabayashi	Public Management, Home Affairs, Posts and Telecommunications	Toranosuke Katayama
Management and Coordination Agency	Kunihiro Tsuzuki	Kunihiro Tsuzuki	Public Management, Home Affairs, Posts and Telecommunications	Toranosuke Katayama
Japan Defense Agency	Tsutomu Kawara	Kazuo Torashima	Toshitsugu Saito	
Economic Planning Agency	Taichi Sakaiya	Taichi Sakaiya	Economic and Fiscal Policy	Tarō Asō
Environment	Kayoko Shimizu	Yoriko Kawaguchi	Yoriko Kawaguchi	
Financial Reconstruction	Sadakazu Tanigaki	Hideyuki Aizawa	Financial Affairs	Hakuo Yanagisawa
			National Public Safety Commission	Bunmei Ibuki
			Council for Science and Technology Policy	Takashi Sasagawa

== Later years ==
After resigning as prime minister, Mori remained a member of the House of Representatives, representing the Ishikawa 2nd district, until announcing in July 2012 that he would not stand in the December 2012 general election.

He was awarded the Padma Bhushan, India's third highest civilian award, in 2004.

=== Russia diplomacy ===
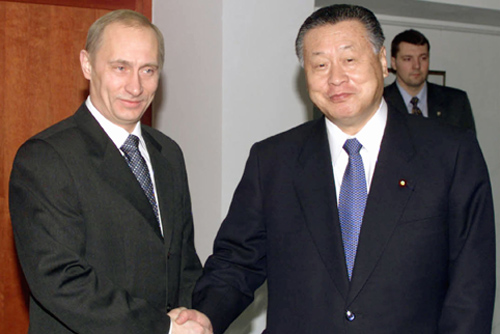
Mori with Russian President Vladimir Putin on 25 March 2001

Mori remained an important player in Russo-Japanese relations following his resignation as prime minister due to his close personal relationship with Vladimir Putin. Prime Minister Yoshihiko Noda of the Democratic Party of Japan considered tapping Mori in 2012 to resolve the dispute between the two countries over the Kuril Islands, despite the fact that Noda and Mori were from opposing parties in the Diet.

In 2013, Mori met with Putin and Sergey Naryshkin in preparations for a summit between Putin and Japanese Prime Minister Shinzō Abe. Mori had at one time suggested that Japan could give Russia three of the four disputed islands in exchange for a peace treaty, which went against the Japanese government's official view that Moscow should acknowledge Japan's ownership of all four.

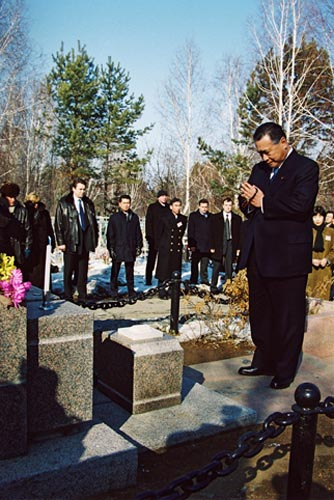
Mori at the grave of his father in Shelekhov

Mori has a personal connection to Russia, as his father Shigeki Mori developed a relationship with the Siberian town of Shelekhov during his time as mayor of the city of Neagari, and developed a bilateral dialogue to improve the gravesites of Soviet soldiers in Japan and Japanese soldiers in Siberia; he was so close to Russia that Japanese authorities monitored him closely as a potential communist sympathizer. The elder Mori visited Shelekhov more than 15 times during his 35 years in office, and was buried there following his death.

=== Sports-related advocacy ===
Mori became President of the Japan Rugby Football Union in June 2005. It had been hoped his clout would help secure the 2011 Rugby Union World Cup for Japan, but instead the event was awarded to New Zealand in late November 2005. This led Mori to accuse the Commonwealth of Nations countries of "passing the ball around their friends." Mori later assisted in Japan's successful bids for both the 2019 Rugby World Cup and 2020 Summer Olympics.

In 2014, at the age of 76, he was appointed to head the organizing committee for the 2020 Summer Olympics in Tokyo. He quipped, "I am destined to live five or six more years if I am lucky. This will be my one last service to the country." However, Mori drew international and domestic criticism for his critical statements about Japan's Olympic figure skaters Mao Asada and Chris Reed and Cathy Reed, who were representing Japan at the 2014 Sochi Olympics.

Another controversy occurred in 2021 when Mori, who at this time was president of the organization responsible for the upcoming Olympic Games, said that women talk too much in meetings. At the organizing committee meeting for the Tokyo Olympics while discussing the objective of aiming for at least 40% of members to be female, he stated that “On boards with a lot of women, the board meetings take so much time. Women have a strong sense of competition. If one person raises their hand, others probably think, I need to say something too. That’s why everyone speaks. [...] You have to regulate speaking time to some extent [...] Or else we’ll never be able to finish” He apologized for his statements and initially stated he would not resign as head of the organizing committee, but on February 11 announced his intention to step down from the post. In his resignation speech the following day, Mori said that he did not intend to demean women, and blamed the media for fueling public anger. He stressed the importance that the Olympics be held in July, adding that the committee's efforts would be wasted if he were to cause trouble by remaining in his post. Seiko Hashimoto, an Olympic bronze medalist in women's speed skating and a seven-time Olympian, was named as Mori's replacement.

=== LDP funds scandal ===
As the former head of the Seiwa Seisaku Kenkyūkai, which was the main faction involved in the 2023–2024 Japanese slush fund scandal, Mori came into question for a possible role in the scheme. Prime Minister Fumio Kishida did not reject the idea of questioning him. In early April 2024, Kishida stated he had spoken with Mori of the matter over the phone and couldn't confirm Mori's involvement.

== Personal life ==
Mori is an avid rugby fan as well as an amateur player. He is married to Chieko (born: Chieko Maki), a fellow Waseda University student, and he has a son, Yūki Mori, and a daughter, Yoko Fujimoto.

In 2003, he received the highest distinction of the Scout Association of Japan, the Golden Pheasant Award.

== Honours ==
National

- Golden Pheasant Award (2003)
- Grand Cordon of the Order of the Paulownia Flowers (2017)

Foreign

- (India) Padma Bhushan (2004)
- (Taiwan) Order of Brilliant Star with Special Grand Cordon (2006)
- (Russia) Medal "In Commemoration of the 300th Anniversary of Saint Petersburg" (2007)
- (France) Grand Officier, Légion d'honneur (2010)
- (South Korea) Order of Diplomatic Service Merit Grand Gwanghwa Medal (2010)

== Notes ==
Political offices
Preceded by Mitsuo Setoyama	Minister of Education; 1983–1984	Succeeded by Hikaru Matsunaga
Preceded by Kozo Watanabe	Minister of International Trade and Industry; 1992–1993	Succeeded by Hiroshi Kumagai
Preceded by Koken Nosaka	Minister of Construction; 1995–1996	Succeeded by Eiichi Nakao
Preceded by Keizō Obuchi	Prime Minister of Japan; 2000–2001	Succeeded by Junichiro Koizumi
Diplomatic posts
Preceded by Gerhard Schröder	Chairperson of the G8; 2000	Succeeded by Silvio Berlusconi

Sporting positions
Preceded by (Brazil) Carlos Arthur Nuzman	President of Organizing Committee for Summer Olympic Games; 2020	Succeeded by (Japan) Seiko Hashimoto
