= Japan–Korea Parliamentarians' Union =

Japan–South Korea political exchange

The Japan–Korea Parliamentarians' Union (日韓議員連盟, Nikkan Giin Renmei) is a politician membership which promotes exchange and friendship between Japan and South Korea.

The Union is the successor group to the former Japan-Korea Parliamentarians' Fellowship (日韓議員懇親会, Nikkan Giin Konshinkai), assuming its current name in 1975.

The chairman since 2023 is former prime minister Yoshihide Suga and the secretary general is Akihisa Nagashima. Former chairmen include Fukushiro Nukaga and Yoshiro Mori.
