= Tatsu Tanaka =

Japanese politician (1892–1985)

- 田中 たつ

Member of the House of Representatives
- In office 10 April 1946 – 31 March 1947
- Preceded by: Constituency established
- Succeeded by: Multi-member district
- Constituency: Tottori at-large

Personal details
- Born: 14 August 1892 Yonago, Tottori, Japan
- Died: 30 August 1985 (aged 93)
- Party: National Cooperative
- Other political affiliations: National (1946–1947)
- Education: Kyoto Prefectural University of Medicine

Tatsu Tanaka (Japanese: 田中たつ; 14 August 1892 – 30 August 1985) was a Japanese midwife and politician. She was one of the first group of women elected to the House of Representatives in 1946.

== Biography ==
Tanaka was born in Yonago in 1892. After finishing primary school, she began training as a nurse, graduating in 1911. She then attended Samba Gakko midwifery school, later studying at Kyoto Prefectural University of Medicine and qualifying as a public health nurse. She became chair of the Tottori Prefecture Nurses' Association and vice president of the Midwives' Association.

After World War II, Tanaka was an independent candidate in Tottori in the 1946 general elections (the first in which women could vote), and was elected to the House of Representatives. After being elected she joined the National Cooperative Party. She unsuccessfully ran for re-election in 1947.

She died in 1985.
