= Kyoto Prefectural University of Medicine =

Coordinates: 35°01′22″N 135°46′13″E

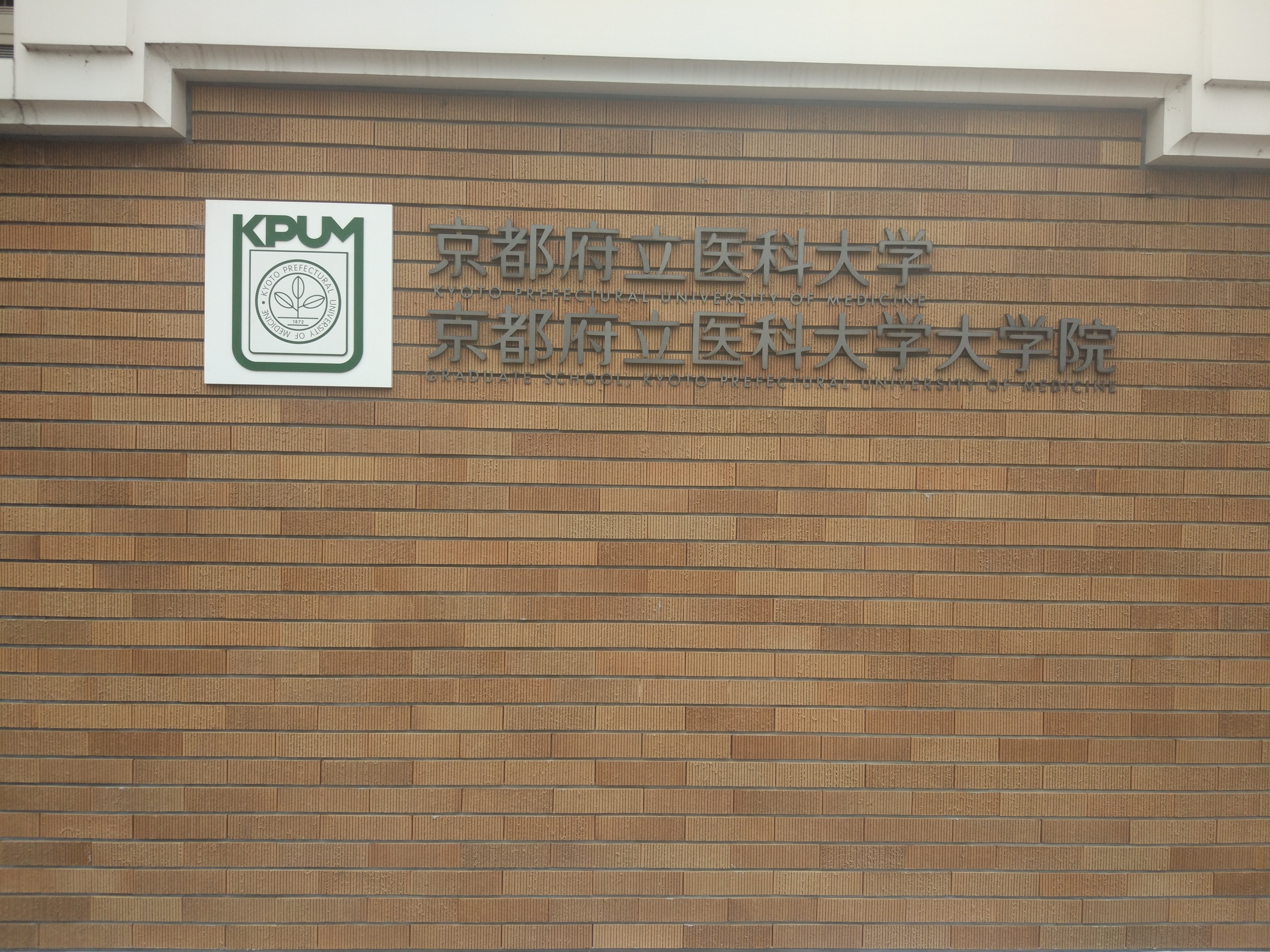
Kyoto Prefectural University of Medicine main entrance sign and insignia.

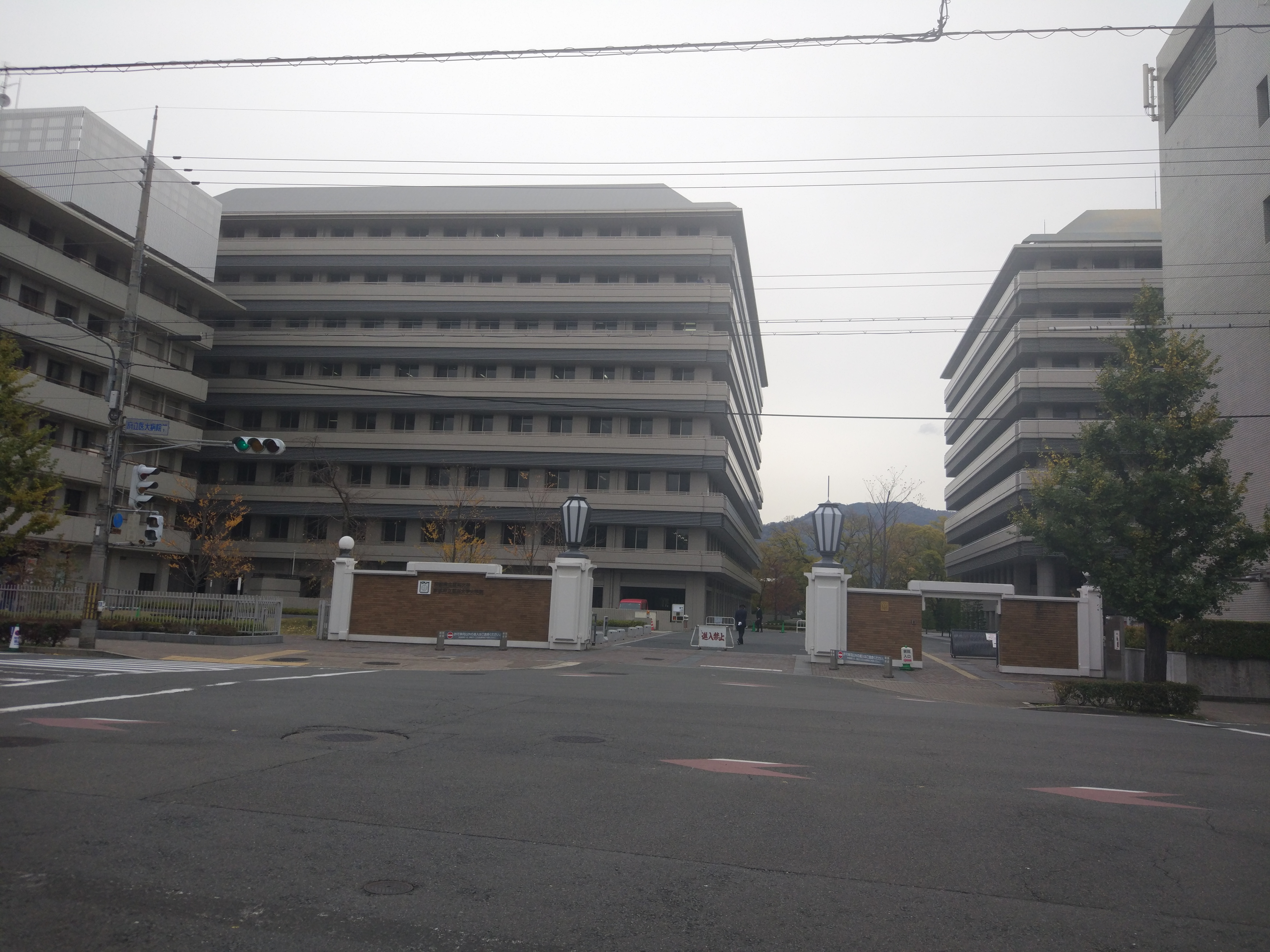
Kyoto Prefectural University of Medicine Kawaramachi campus main entrance.

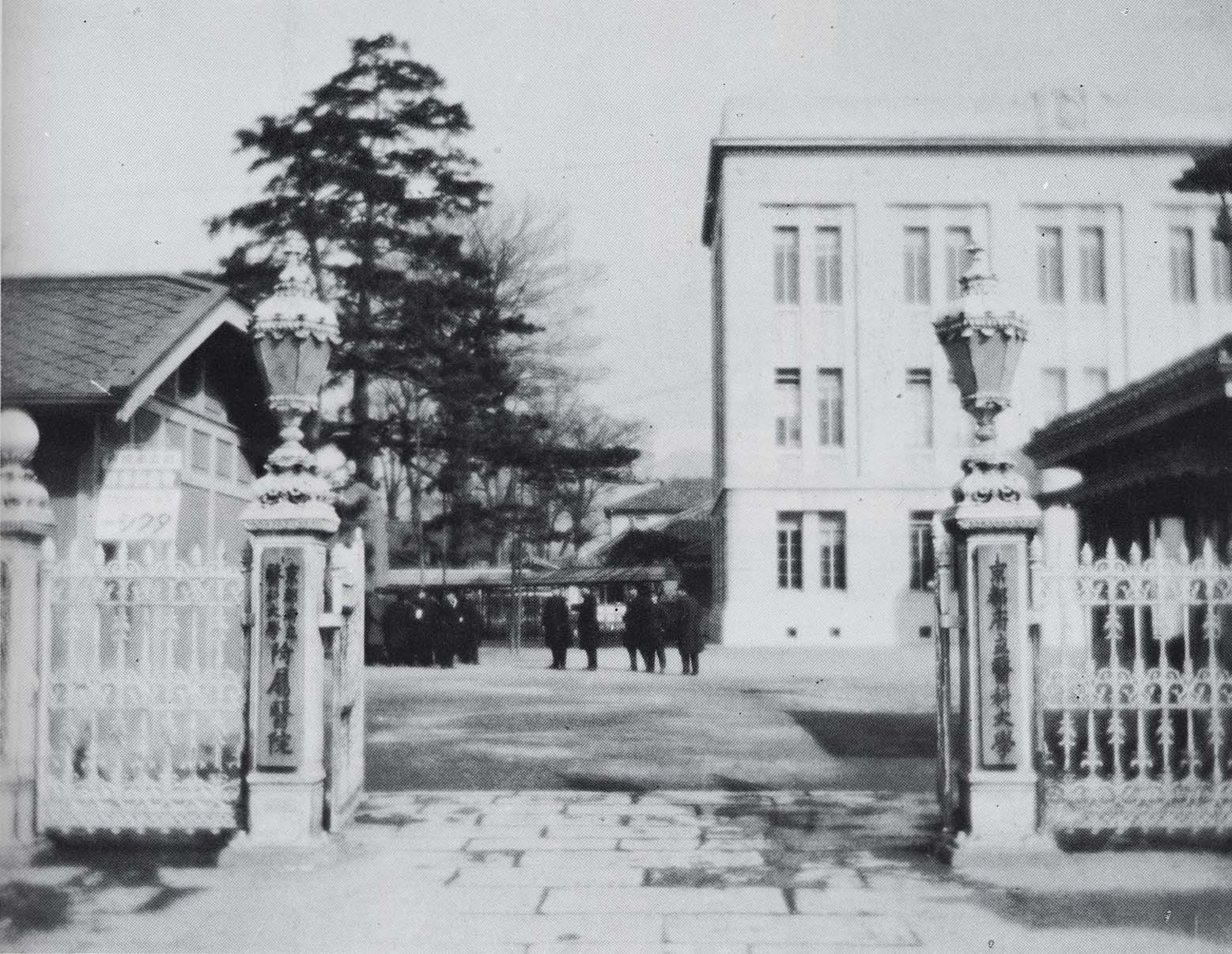
An old photo of Kyoto Prefectural University of Medicine (before 1951)

Kyoto Prefectural University of Medicine (京都府立医科大学, Kyoto furitsu ika daigaku) is a public university in Kyoto, Kyoto, Japan. The school's predecessor was founded in 1872, and it was chartered as a university in 1921. KPUM differs from Kyoto University, or "Kyodai" which is located nearby across the Kamo River, in that Kyoto University was nationally incorporated in 2004, and as such falls partly under the control of the Japanese Ministry of Education(文部科学省 Monbu-kagaku-shō). Kyoto Prefectural University of Medicine declined to become nationally incorporated in order to retain a degree of academic freedom and independence. A major difference between the two schools can be described in terms of specialization. KPUM has medicine as its primary focus, whereas Kyodai concentrates on providing recruits for corporate Japan. Both schools pursue a shared passion for a recently developed concept known as "Gurobaru Jinzai Ikusei", reaching past borders for Japan's future success.

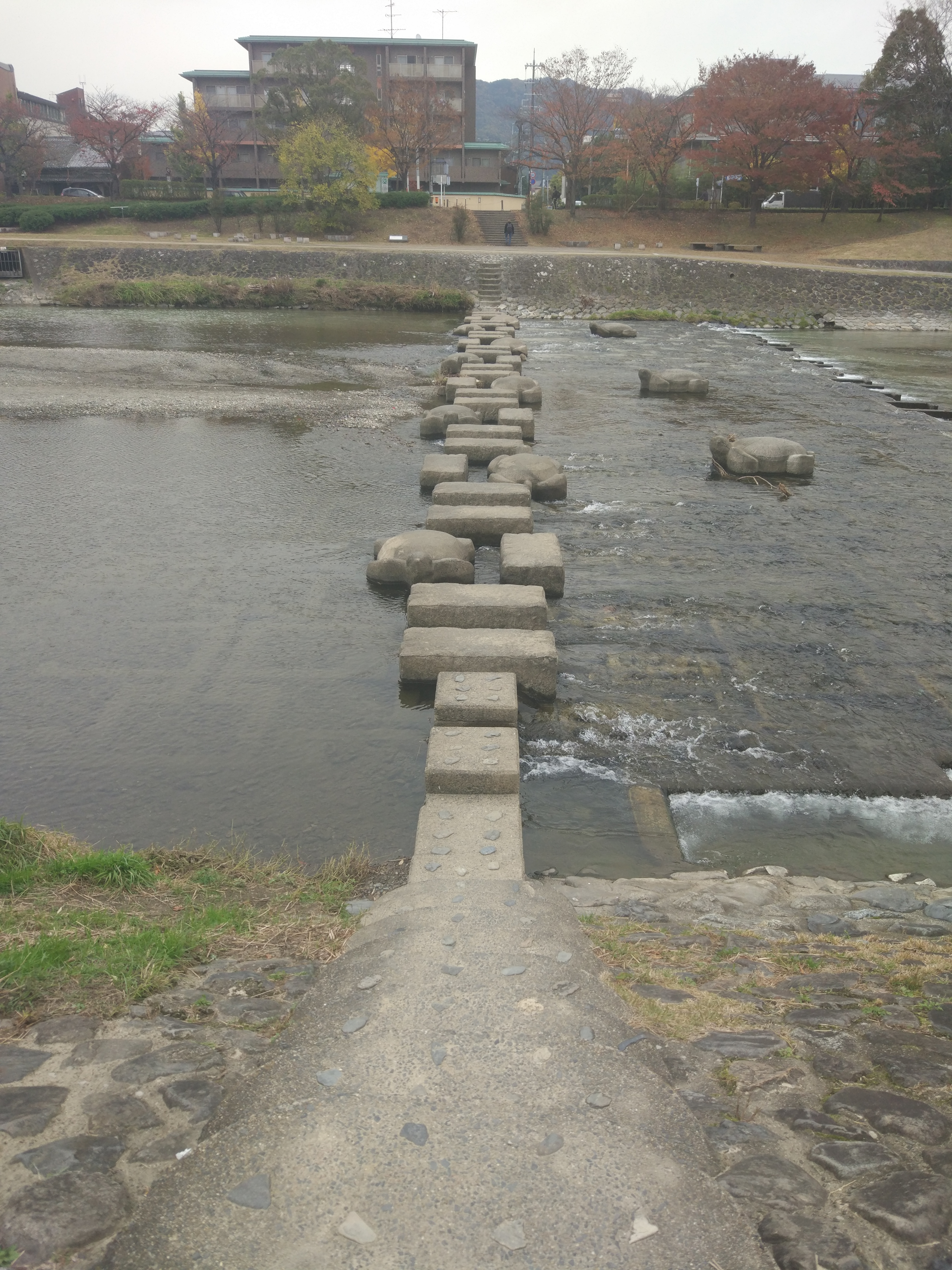
Kyoto Prefectural University of Medicine Iconic "Leaping Stones" across the Kamo river provide a quick race across the water outside of monsoon season.

Kyoto Prefectural University of Medicine Hospital (京都府立医科大学附属病院) has a long history in the Kansai area beginning in 1872, more than 4 years after the Meiji Restoration that ended the Late Tokugawa Shogunate. Due to wishes from the citizens for western style medicine to be more accessible, a local hospital and training institute was lobbied for, but owing to the political turmoil of these early years, the new government couldn't do much to help. So the people took on the mission and through fundraising from businesses, temples and individuals, the hospital finally was built. Since that time, the hospital has been designated as a central facility for the treatment of cancer, and is one of fifteen centres nationwide for the treatment of childhood cancer. There is also a facility with an integrated approach to the treatment of dementia.

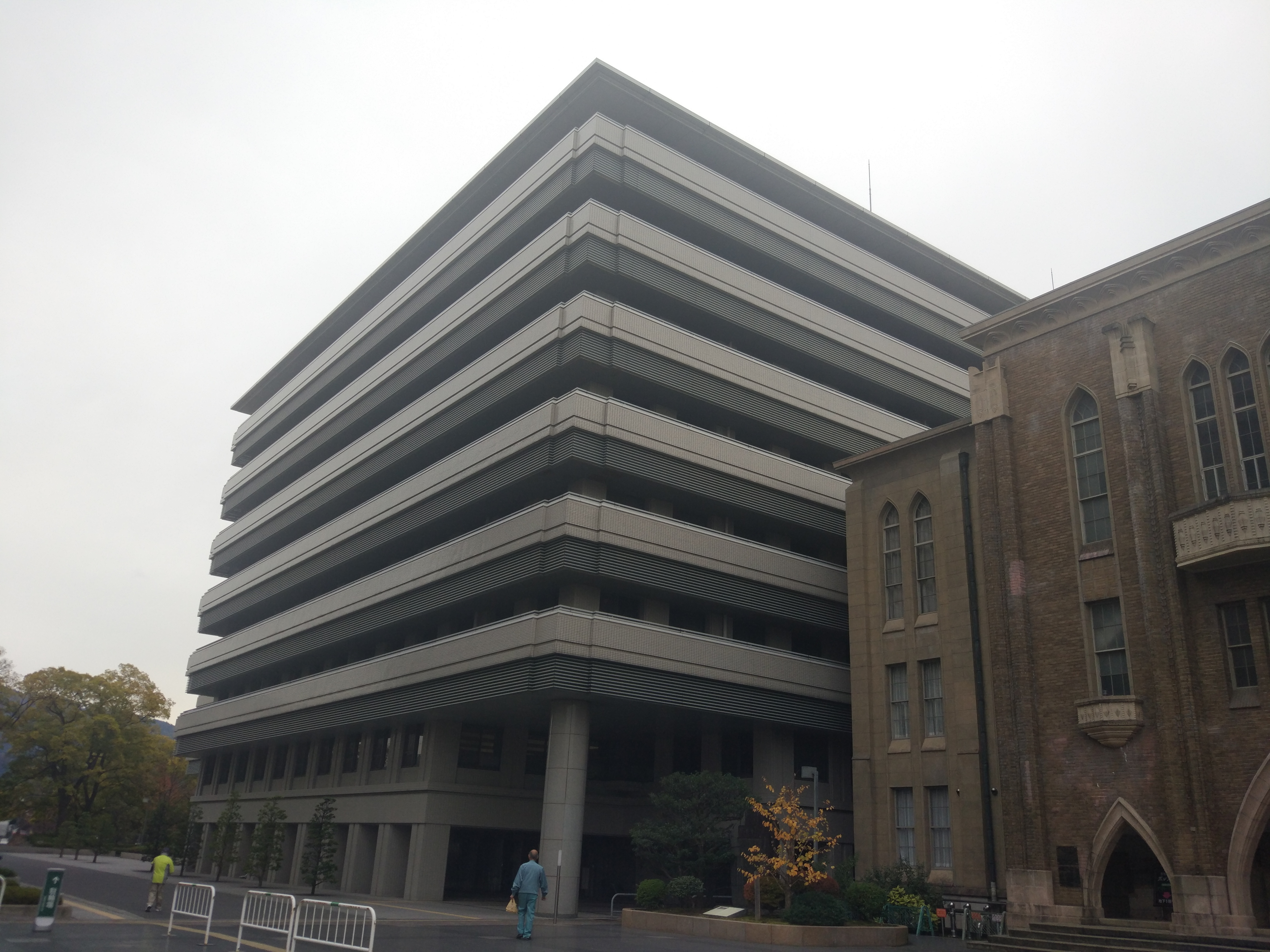
Kyoto Prefectural University of Medicine basic medicine building.

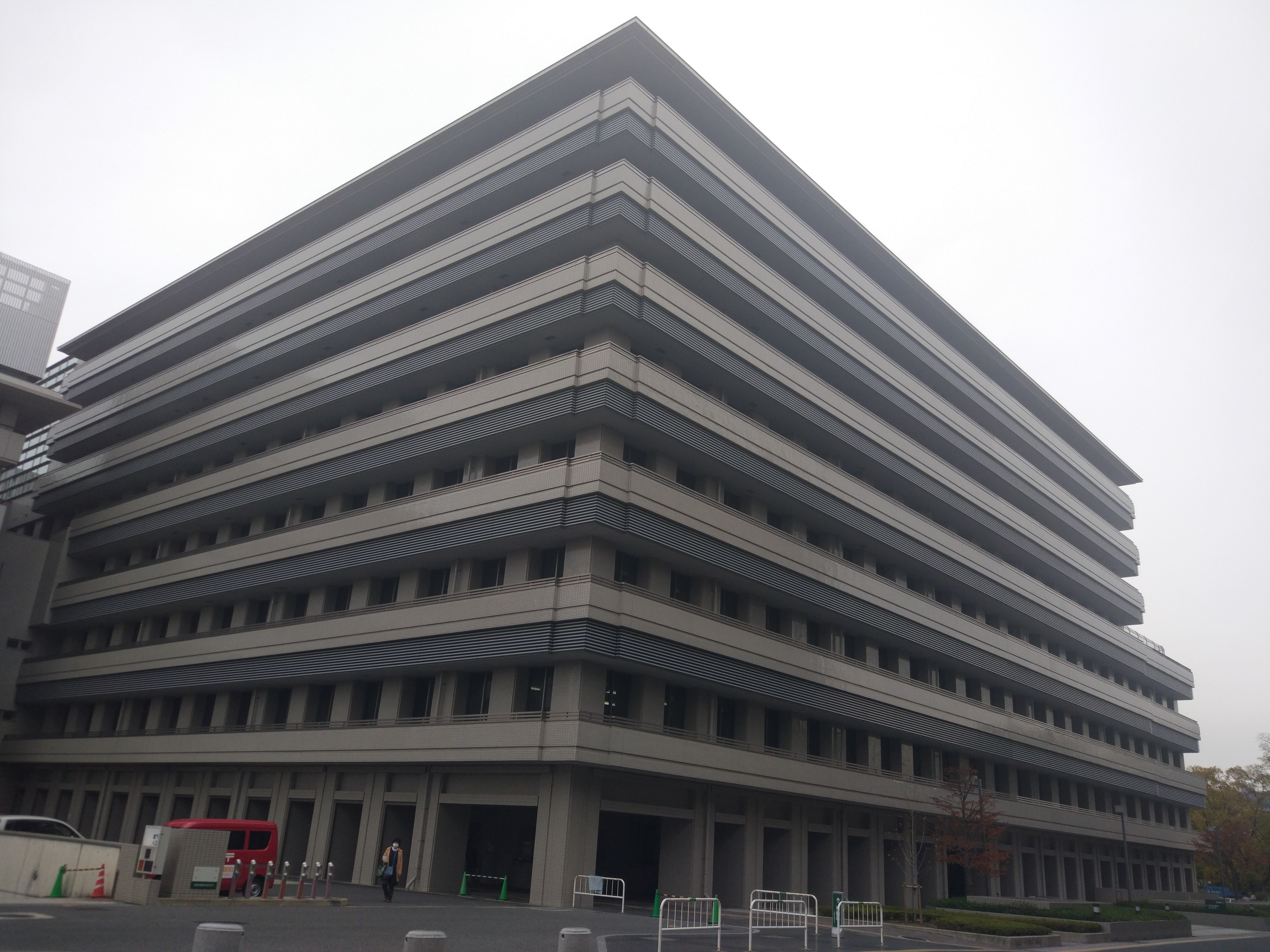
Kyoto Prefectural University of Medicine outpatient ward/clinical education building.

The University has two main divisions - a medical school and a nursing school. Yearly student capacity is just over 100 for medical, and 75 to 80 for nursing enrollment. It is a government supported university with the distinction of being the third oldest in Japan. A major goal for KPUM has been the broadcasting of leading edge medical knowledge and technique to the outer limits of Kyoto prefecture, which covers over 4600 square kilometres straight across to the Sea of Japan. To accomplish this, the 'KPUM Medical Care Center' was established in 1971 as an official administrative body in charge of sending graduate medical doctors to affiliated hospitals, medical agencies and health care centres throughout the greater Kyoto region. This program is regular and ongoing, and involves 120 hospitals.

Graduate School of Health Nursing was originally established in 1889 as the University Midwife School, and through the years has morphed and transformed through various names and additions such as Kyoto Prefectural Medical School University Midwife and Nursing School, College of Medical Technology Midwifery Department, as well as a Graduate School of Cancer Nursing Specialist course(CNS) added in 2011.

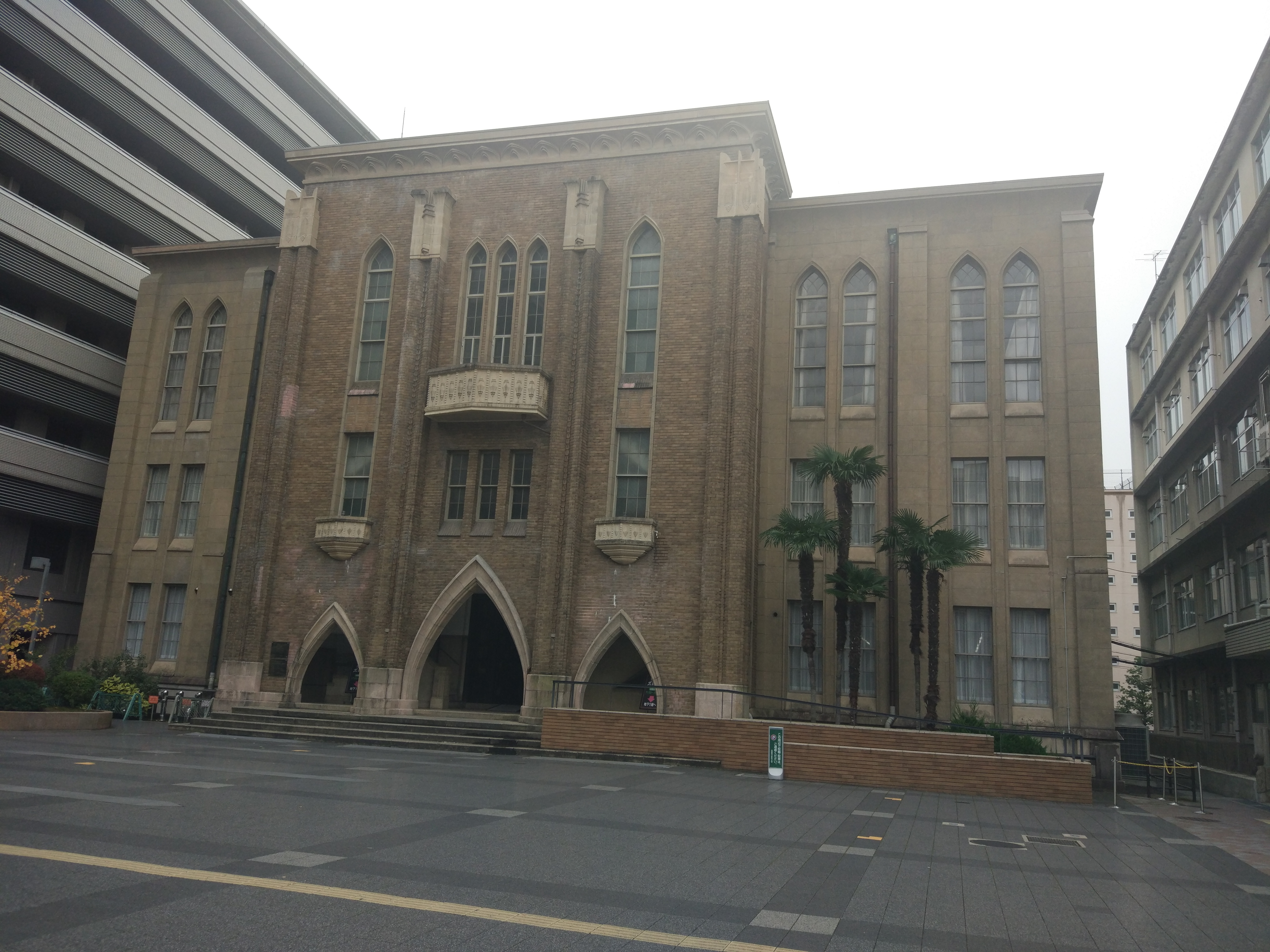
Kyoto Prefectural University of Medicine administration building was once the university library. The current library is across the street together with the Nursing School on the Hirokoji campus.

The Pediatric Research Institute that was set up in 1979 is mainly concerned with severe childhood related diseases that are hard to treat by regular healthcare institutions. Along the same lines as Toronto's Hospital For Sick Children, wards were created in the hospital's newly built headquarters, and the Institute was renamed 'Children's Medical Care Center' in 2011. The president is 竹中洋 Takenaka Hiroshi, M.D., Ph.D.

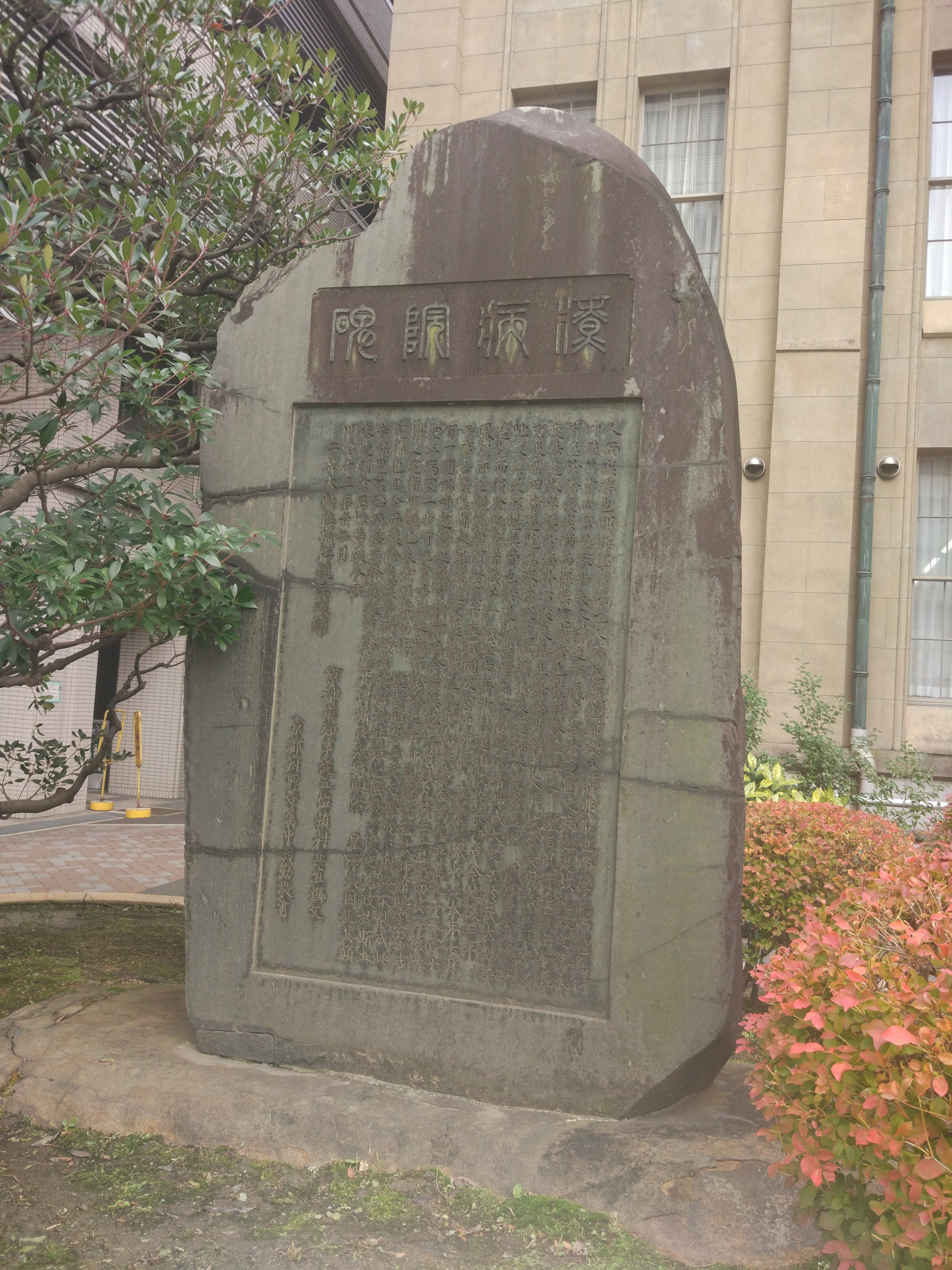
Kyoto Prefectural University of Medicine Ryobo-In monument was erected to celebrate the opening of the original hospital building on July 18th 1880. The Institute of Kyoto Prefectural University of Medicine, as it was originally known, was modeled on the design of Leipzig University Hospital in Germany, and was one of the best medical establishments in Japan at that time.

== Alumni ==
- Hitoshi Okamura
- Kazuki Ōmori
- Tatsu Tanaka

== Notable faculty members ==
- Yoshimura Hisato
