= Koken Nosaka =

Japanese politician (1924–2004)

- 野坂 浩賢

Chief Cabinet Secretary
- In office 8 August 1995 – 1 November 1996
- Prime Minister: Tomiichi Murayama
- Preceded by: Kozo Igarashi
- Succeeded by: Seiroku Kajiyama

Minister of Construction
- In office 30 June 1994 – 8 August 1995
- Prime Minister: Tomiichi Murayama
- Preceded by: Yoshirō Mori
- Succeeded by: Kōji Morimoto

Member of the House of Representatives
- In office 8 July 1986 – 27 September 1996
- Preceded by: Bun Takebe
- Succeeded by: Constituency abolished
- Constituency: Tottori at-large
- In office 11 December 1972 – 28 November 1983
- Preceded by: Bun Takebe
- Succeeded by: Yasuo Shimada
- Constituency: Tottori at-large

Personal details
- Born: 17 September 1924 Tottori Prefecture, Japan
- Died: 18 April 2004 (aged 79) Yonago, Tottori, Japan
- Party: Social Democratic
- Other political affiliations: Socialist (before 1996)
- Education: Hosei University

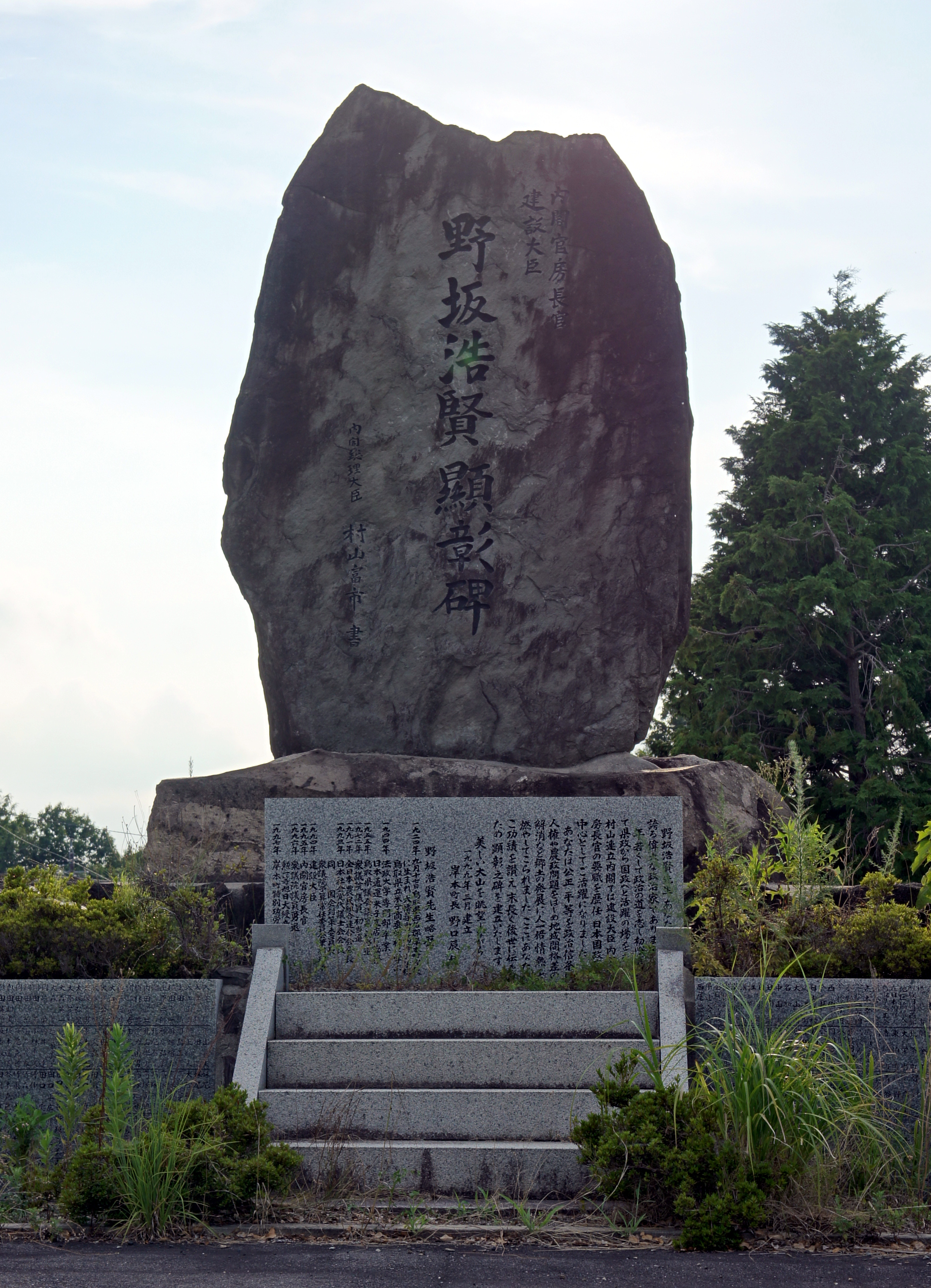
Commending monument in Hōki, Tottori

Koken Nosaka (野坂 浩賢, Nosaka Kōken; 17 September 1924 – 18 April 2004) was a Japanese politician. He was first elected to the Diet of Japan in 1972, representing the Tottori at-large district. A member of the Social Democratic Party, he served as construction minister and chief cabinet secretary in the cabinet led by Prime Minister Tomiichi Murayama. Liberal Democratic Party politician Yōhei Kōno described Nosaka as "the main player" in forming the LDP-SDP coalition governments of the mid-1990s.

Political offices
Preceded by Kozo Igarashi	Chief Cabinet Secretary; 1995–1996	Succeeded by Seiroku Kajiyama
Preceded by Kōji Morimoto	Minister of Construction; 1994–1995	Succeeded by Yoshirō Mori
