= College of Medical Technology, Kyoto Prefectural University of Medicine =

Junior college in Kamigyō-ku, Kyoto, Japan

Coordinates: 35°01′22″N 135°46′13″E

- 京都府立医科大学医療技術短期大学部
- Type: Public
- Established: 1993
- Location: Kyoto, Japan
- Website: http://www.f.kpu-m.ac.jp/c/

College of Medical Technology, Kyoto Prefectural University of Medicine (京都府立医科大学医療技術短期大学部, Kyōto Furitsu Ika daigaku Iryō Gijutsu Tanki Daigakubu) is a public junior college in Kamigyō-ku, Kyoto, Japan. The junior college opened in 1993, and closed in 2005. The predecessor of the school was founded in April 1889.

== Academic departments ==
- Nursing

== Advanced courses ==
- Public Health Nurse
- Midwifery

== See also ==
- Kyoto Prefectural University of Medicine
