= Tokuichiro Tamazawa =

Japanese politician (born 1937)

- 玉沢 徳一郎
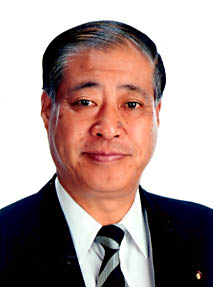
- Official portrait, 1999

Minister of Agriculture, Forestry and Fisheries
- In office 5 October 1999 – 4 July 2000
- Prime Minister: Keizō Obuchi; Yoshirō Mori
- Preceded by: Shōichi Nakagawa
- Succeeded by: Yoichi Tani

Director-General of the Japan Defense Agency
- In office 30 June 1994 – 8 August 1995
- Prime Minister: Tomiichi Murayama
- Preceded by: Atsushi Kanda
- Succeeded by: Seishirō Etō

Member of the House of Representatives
- In office 14 November 2003 – 21 July 2009
- Constituency: Tohoku PR
- In office 19 July 1993 – 2 June 2000
- Preceded by: Iwao Kudō
- Succeeded by: Multi-member district
- Constituency: Iwate 1st (1993–1996); Tohoku PR (1996–2000)
- In office 10 December 1976 – 24 January 1990
- Preceded by: Gorō Yamanaka
- Succeeded by: Kuniki Yamanaka
- Constituency: Iwate 1st

Personal details
- Born: 16 December 1937 (age 88) Tarō, Iwate, Japan
- Party: Liberal Democratic
- Education: Waseda University

Tokuichiro Tamazawa (玉沢 徳一郎, Tamazawa Tokuichirō; born 16 December 1937) is a former Japanese politician who served in the House of Representatives in the Diet (national legislature) as a member of the Liberal Democratic Party. He is a native of Tarō, Iwate and attended a graduate school at Waseda University. He was elected for the first time in 1976 as an independent after unsuccessful runs in 1969 and 1972.

From 1994 to 1995 he was Director General of the Japan Defense Agency.

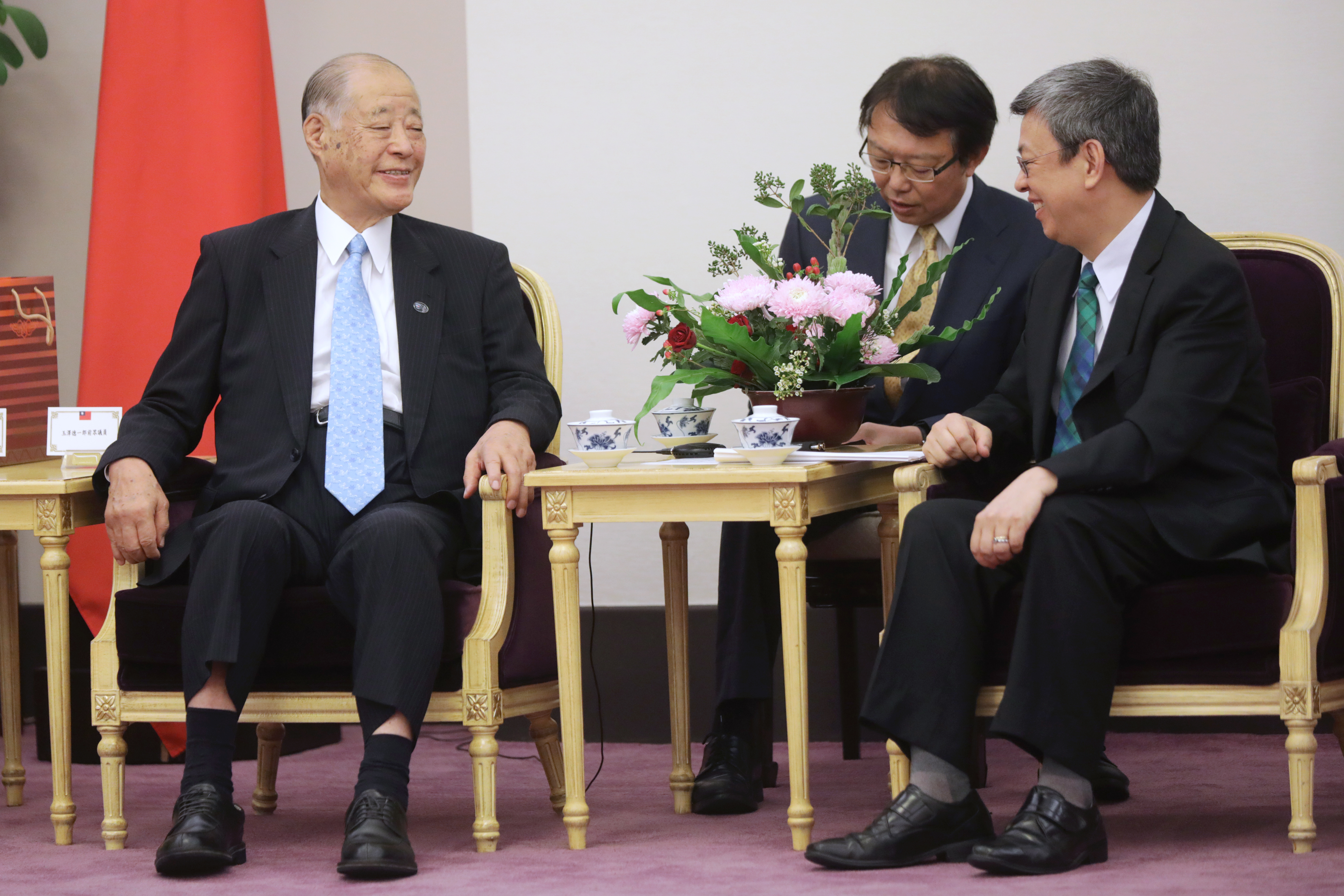
Tamazawa with Taiwanese Vice President Chen Chien-jen in 2017

In May 2008 Tamazawa was awarded the Order of Brilliant Star with Grand Cordon from President Chen Shui-bian as recognition for the work he has done to foster relations between Taiwan and Japan.
