= Tottori at-large district (House of Representatives) =

Electoral district in Japan

The Tottori at-large district (Japanese: 鳥取県全県区, Hepburn: Tottori-ken Zenken-ku) was an electoral district represented in the House of Representatives in the National Diet of Japan. From 1947 until 1993, it elected four representatives from Tottori Prefecture.

== History ==
In the 1947 Japanese general election, the Japan Socialist Party was the only party to have two winning candidates for the district, while the Liberal Party and Tottori Prefectural Farmers' Union had one each. For the next four elections until the 1955 Japanese general election, most of the winning candidates would come from parties that would eventually merge into the Liberal Democratic Party; the only two exceptions were Kaku Ashika and Itaru Yonehara, who were elected to the district for left-wing parties. Starting with the 1958 Japanese general election, the LDP would hold at least half of the district's seats for the rest of the district's existence. Ashika, Bun Takebe, and Koken Nosaka being the only representatives elected from the district without any affiliation with the LDP.

At the time the Public Offices Election Law came into law in 1950, the district encompassed the entirely of Tottori Prefecture.

Due to the 1994 Japanese electoral reform, the at-large district was replaced with two single-member districts starting with the 1996 Japanese general election.

== Results ==
1947
Party	Candidate	Votes	%	±%
Liberal	Naomichi Inada	37,540	16.7	New
Socialist	Hideo Shōji	35,704	15.9	New
Other	Jitsuzō Horie	31,946	14.2	New
Socialist	Shizuo Kajikawa	30,325	13.5	New
Liberal	Katsutarō Kadowaki	29,036	12.9	New
Other	Shōzō Matsuda	22,432	10.0	New
National Cooperative	Tatsu Tanaka	13,596	6.0	New
JCP	Itaru Yonehara	11,751	5.2	New
Socialist	Toyokichi Fujii	6,314	2.8	New
Other	Gorō Ikegami	3,585	1.6	New
Other	Hikozō Yuhara	2,316	1.0	New

1949
Party	Candidate	Votes	%	±%
JCP	Itaru Yonehara	43,654	17.0	11.8
Democratic Liberal	Naomichi Inada	39,805	15.5	New
Democratic Liberal	Katsutarō Kadowaki	39,244	15.3	New
Socialist	Kaku Ashika	35,779	14.0	−1.9
Labourers and Farmers	Jitsuzō Horie	28,792	11.2	New
Democratic Liberal	Yūji Tejima	26,501	10.3	New
Socialist	Hideo Shōji	18,094	7.1	−6.4
Socialist	Shizuo Kajikawa	17,300	6.7	3.9
Pro-American Benevolent Workers' Party	Reiko Gotō	3,563	1.4	New
Democratic	Yukito Uchida	1,977	0.8	New
Japan Social Reform Party	Gorō Ikegami	1,745	0.7	New

1952
Party	Candidate	Votes	%	±%
Left Socialist	Kaku Ashika	43,369	14.8	New
Liberal	Jitsuzō Tokuyasu	43,278	14.7	New
Liberal	Masami Nakata	41,223	14.7	New
Kaishintō	Yoshimi Furui	39,817	13.6	New
Japan Reconstruction Federation	Hideyuki Miyoshi	32,468	11.1	New
Independent	Masamichi Akazawa	29,544	10.1	New
Liberal	Katsutarō Kadowaki	28,446	9.7	New
Liberal	Naomichi Inada	12,552	4.3	New
Liberal	Yūji Tejima	11,398	3.9	New
JCP	Itaru Yonehara	7,920	2.7	−14.3
Independent	Moriya Hatashin	3,741	1.3	New

1953
Party	Candidate	Votes	%	±%
Left Socialist	Kaku Ashika	48,276	17.1	2.3
Kaishintō	Masamichi Akazawa	45,227	16.0	2.5
Liberal	Jitsuzō Tokuyasu	42,604	15.1	0.4
Kaishintō	Yoshimi Furui	42,517	15.1	New
Liberal	Masami Nakata	41,399	14.6	−0.1
Liberal	Katsutarō Kadowaki	30,316	10.7	1.0
Left Socialist	Kanji Morimoto	19,864	7.0	New
JCP	Itaru Yonehara	6,664	2.4	−0.3
Independent	Moriya Hatashin	5,597	2.0	0.7

1955
Party	Candidate	Votes	%	±%
Democratic	Yoshimi Furui	62,538	21.9	New
Left Socialist	Kaku Ashika	59,564	20.8	3.7
Democratic	Masamichi Akazawa	54,128	18.9	New
Liberal	Jitsuzō Tokuyasu	49,545	17.3	2.2
Right Socialist	Toshitada Nakanishi	33,481	11.7	New
Independent	Moriya Hatashin	14,483	5.1	3.1
JCP	Itaru Yonehara	12,197	4.3	1.9

1958
Party	Candidate	Votes	%	±%
LDP	Jitsuzō Tokuyasu	56,529	19.1	−1.7
LDP	Masamichi Akazawa	56,452	19.1	New
LDP	Yoshimi Furui	54,132	18.3	New
Socialist	Kaku Ashika	45,999	15.5	New
Socialist	Toshitada Nakanishi	41,216	13.9	New
Independent	Katsutarō Kadowaki	18,832	6.4	New
Independent	Moriya Hatashin	9,132	3.1	−2.0
Independent	Naomichi Inada	5,936	2.0	New
JCP	Ichiji Kawake	4,634	1.6	−2.7
Independent	Akira Umebayashi	3,113	1.1	New

1960
Party	Candidate	Votes	%	±%
Socialist	Kaku Ashika	75,927	26.1	12.2
LDP	Yoshimi Furui	66,989	23.0	3.9
LDP	Jitsuzō Tokuyasu	61,551	21.2	2.1
LDP	Masamichi Akazawa	55,699	19.2	0.9
Democratic Socialist	Toshitada Nakanishi	23,564	8.1	New
JCP	Ichiji Kawake	6,928	2.4	0.8

1963
Party	Candidate	Votes	%	±%
LDP	Jitsuzō Tokuyasu	60,804	20.7	−2.3
LDP	Yoshimi Furui	60,277	20.5	−0.7
LDP	Masamichi Akazawa	57,897	19.7	0.5
Socialist	Kaku Ashika	57,380	19.5	−6.6
Democratic Socialist	Bun Takebe	50,937	17.3	9.2
JCP	Minoru Ishio	6,737	2.3	−0.1

1967
Party	Candidate	Votes	%	±%
Socialist	Bun Takebe	64,002	25.6	6.1
LDP	Yoshimi Furui	59,180	23.7	3.0
LDP	Jitsuzō Tokuyasu	56,422	22.6	2.1
LDP	Masamichi Akazawa	54,385	21.8	2.1
Socialist	Kaku Ashika	54,262	21.7	New
JCP	Toshitomo Takeuchi	6,424	2.6	0.3

1969
Party	Candidate	Votes	%	±%
LDP	Masamichi Akazawa	65,582	20.5	−3.2
LDP	Jitsuzō Tokuyasu	64,638	20.2	−2.4
LDP	Yoshimi Furui	45,635	14.3	−7.5
Socialist	Bun Takebe	43,798	13.7	−11.9
Kōmeitō	Tomomasa Kawakami	41,285	12.9	New
Socialist	Yoshio Nakata	32,295	10.1	−11.7
Independent	Isao Akihisa	19,351	6.0	New
JCP	Minoru Ishio	7,296	2.3	−0.3

1972
Party	Candidate	Votes	%	±%
LDP	Jitsuzō Tokuyasu	61,431	18.3	−2.2
LDP	Masamichi Akazawa	55,584	16.5	−3.7
Independent	Yasuo Shimada	54,373	16.2	New
Socialist	Koken Nosaka	53,192	15.8	2.1
Socialist	Bun Takebe	49,106	14.6	4.5
LDP	Yoshimi Furui	47,511	14.1	−0.2
JCP	Taizō Tanaka	15,153	4.5	2.2

1976
Party	Candidate	Votes	%	±%
LDP	Yoshimi Furui	59,328	16.2	−2.1
LDP	Hideyuki Aizawa	58,128	15.8	−0.7
Socialist	Bun Takebe	53,990	14.7	−1.1
Socialist	Koken Nosaka	49,594	13.5	−1.1
LDP	Jitsuzō Tokuyasu	46,571	12.7	−1.4
LDP	Yasuo Shimada	42,089	11.5	New
Kōmeitō	Kenji Yamazaki	40,898	11.1	New
JCP	Taizō Tanaka	11,980	3.3	−1.2
Independent	Shinzō Koga	4,290	1.2	New

1979
Party	Candidate	Votes	%	±%
LDP	Hideyuki Aizawa	64,080	17.8	1.6
LDP	Yoshimi Furui	60,753	16.9	1.1
Socialist	Koken Nosaka	60,705	16.9	2.2
Socialist	Bun Takebe	57,575	16.0	2.5
LDP	Jitsuzō Tokuyasu	53,978	15.0	2.3
LDP	Yasuo Shimada	47,759	13.3	1.8
JCP	Shūichi Itani	12,830	3.6	0.3
Independent	Yukihiro Tanaka	1,539	0.4	New

1980
Party	Candidate	Votes	%	±%
LDP	Hideyuki Aizawa	71,217	19.9	2.1
Socialist	Koken Nosaka	63,847	17.8	0.9
Socialist	Bun Takebe	63,735	17.8	1.8
LDP	Yoshimi Furui	63,701	17.8	0.9
LDP	Yasuo Shimada	59,164	16.5	1.5
Independent	Takayoshi Tsuneda	23,495	6.6	New
JCP	Shūichi Itani	12,683	3.5	−0.1

1983
Party	Candidate	Votes	%	±%
LDP	Yasuo Shimada	80,406	22.7	2.8
Socialist	Bun Takebe	67,603	19.1	1.3
LDP	Kōzō Hirabayashi	67,054	18.9	1.1
LDP	Hideyuki Aizawa	66,121	18.7	2.2
Socialist	Koken Nosaka	61,752	17.4	−0.4
JCP	Mutsumi Yasuda	8,935	2.5	−1.0
Independent	Shigenori Uchita	2,081	0.6	New

1986
Party	Candidate	Votes	%	±%
LDP	Kōzō Hirabayashi	71,015	18.6	−4.1
LDP	Hideyuki Aizawa	69,933	18.3	−0.6
Socialist	Koken Nosaka	66,067	17.3	−1.8
LDP	Shigeru Ishiba	56,534	14.8	−3.9
Kōmeitō	Nobutaka Kumagai	51,632	13.5	New
Socialist	Bun Takebe	46,917	12.3	−5.1
Independent	Mitsuru Shimada	11,307	3.0	New
JCP	Mutsumi Yasuda	8,097	2.1	−0.4

1990
Party	Candidate	Votes	%	±%
LDP	Shigeru Ishiba	82,169	21.5	2.9
Socialist	Koken Nosaka	75,439	19.8	2.5
Socialist	Bun Takebe	75,112	19.7	7.4
LDP	Hideyuki Aizawa	71,354	18.7	0.4
LDP	Kōzō Hirabayashi	66,345	17.4	2.6
JCP	Naoyuki Iwanaga	8,332	2.2	0.1
Independent	Toyoaki Nakanishi	1,829	0.5	New
Independent	Shigenori Uchita	900	0.2	−0.4

1993
Party	Candidate	Votes	%	±%
Independent	Shigeru Ishiba	137,025	40.4	New
LDP	Kōzō Hirabayashi	69,508	20.5	−1.0
Socialist	Koken Nosaka	59,497	17.5	−2.3
LDP	Hideyuki Aizawa	48,793	14.4	−4.3
JCP	Yasuko Sasaki	24,579	7.2	5.0
Turnout		467,413	73.7	
