= Tomiichi Murayama =

Prime Minister of Japan from 1994 to 1996

- 村山 富市
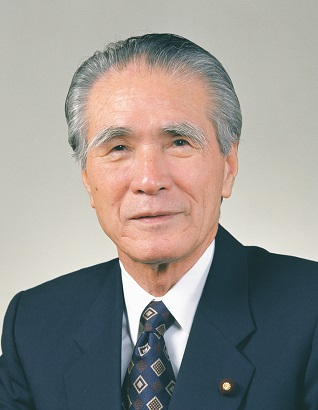
- Official portrait, 1994

Prime Minister of Japan
- In office 30 June 1994 – 11 January 1996
- Monarch: Akihito
- Deputy: Yōhei Kōno; Ryutaro Hashimoto
- Preceded by: Tsutomu Hata
- Succeeded by: Ryutaro Hashimoto

Chairman of the Social Democratic Party
- In office 19 January 1996 – 28 September 1996
- Preceded by: Himself (as JSP Chair)
- Succeeded by: Takako Doi

Chairman of the Japan Socialist Party
- In office 25 September 1993 – 19 January 1996
- Preceded by: Sadao Yamahana
- Succeeded by: Himself (as SDP Chair)

Member of the House of Representatives
- In office 19 December 1983 – 2 June 2000
- Preceded by: Tadafumi Hatano
- Succeeded by: Ban Kugimiya
- Constituency: Former Ōita 1st (1983–1996); Ōita 1st (1996–2000)
- In office 11 December 1972 – 19 May 1980
- Preceded by: Sakae Aizawa
- Succeeded by: Tadafumi Hatano
- Constituency: Former Ōita 1st

Member of the Ōita Prefectural Assembly
- In office 1963–1972
- Constituency: Ōita City

Member of the Ōita City Council
- In office 1955–1963

Personal details
- Born: 3 March 1924 Ōita, Japan
- Died: 17 October 2025 (aged 101) Ōita, Japan
- Party: Social Democratic (1996–2025)
- Other political affiliations: Left Socialist (1951–1955); Socialist (1955–1996)
- Spouse: Yoshie Murayama (m. 1953; died 2024)
- Education: Meiji University

Military service
- Allegiance: Japan
- Branch: Imperial Japanese Army
- Service years: 1944–1945
- Rank: Officer candidate
- Conflict: World War II

Tomiichi Murayama (村山 富市, Murayama Tomiichi; 3 March 1924 – 17 October 2025) was a Japanese politician who served as Prime Minister of Japan from 1994 to 1996. He was the country's only socialist premier since Tetsu Katayama in 1948, and is best remembered for the Murayama Statement on the 50th anniversary of the end of World War II, in which he officially apologized for Japan's past colonial wars and aggression.

Born in Ōita Prefecture, Murayama graduated from Meiji University in 1946, and became a labor union official in his home prefecture. He was elected to the Ōita City Council in 1955 as a member of the Japan Socialist Party; he was then elected to the Ōita Prefectural Assembly in 1963 and to the National Diet in 1972.

After the JSP joined the government following the 1993 election, he became its leader, then became prime minister in 1994 as the head of a new coalition of the JSP, Liberal Democratic Party, and New Party Sakigake. During his time as prime minister, Murayama was noted for his Murayama Statement in which he apologised for the country's actions during World War II, oversaw a crumbling relationship between Japan and the United States, and his government was criticized for its responses to the Great Hanshin earthquake and Tokyo subway sarin attack in 1995. He resigned as prime minister in 1996, and reorganized the JSP as the Social Democratic Party. The new party lost many of its seats in the 1996 election, and he resigned as its leader soon after.

== Early life and education ==
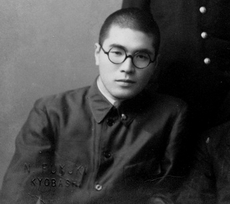
A teenage Murayama while working at a printing company

Murayama was born in Ōita Prefecture on 3 March 1924; his father was a fisherman. He was the sixth son of eleven children. His father died when he was fourteen, forcing him to deliver newspapers and work small jobs to help make a living. After graduating from Oita Municipal High School in 1938, he moved to Tokyo, and began working at a printing factory during the day, and studied at the Tokyo Municipal School of Commerce at night.

He entered Meiji University in 1943 as a philosophy student, but was mobilised in 1944 and assigned to work in the Ishikawajima shipyards. Later that year, he was drafted into the Imperial Army and assigned to the 72nd Infantry of the 23rd Brigade of the 23rd Division as a private second class. He was demobilised following Japan's surrender with the rank of officer candidate, and finished the war as a cadet with the rank of sergeant. He graduated from Meiji University in 1946, and in 1948, he became the general secretary of the Oita Prefecture Fishing Village Youth League. After the Fishing Village Youth Alliance was disbanded after achieving successes such as establishing a fisheries cooperative, he subsequently worked as the secretary of the Oita Prefectural Employees' Labor Union.

== Political career ==
In 1951, he ran for election as a member of the Oita City Council, but was defeated as runner-up. In 1953, he married his wife, Yoshie Murayama. In 1955, he ran for the Oita City Council again, and was elected as a member of the Japan Socialist Party, being elected twice after. After serving for eight years, he ran for the Prefectural Assembly of Oita in 1963, and was elected, there serving for nine years. He then ran in the 1972 Japanese general election for the former Oita's 1st, being placed at the top of the list and winning. He was then elected nine more times in the district.

=== Parliamentary career ===
In July, later that year, the 1993 election saw the LDP lose over 50 seats, and the JSP under Sadao Yamahana took a similar tumble, losing seats to new opposition parties such as the Japan Renewal Party or the Japan New Party, both under LDP defectors Tsutomu Hata and Morihiro Hosokawa respectively. In August, the Hosokawa Cabinet - the first non-LDP cabinet since the party's formation - was established. The JSP, despite being the biggest party, was not given the Prime Minister spot. Instead, Sadao Yamahana was named Minister in Charge of Political Reform. Yamahana resigned from JSP leadership to take responsibility for the poor showing in the 1993 election. Murayama was elected as leader without much in the way of opposition, appointing Wataru Kubo as General-Secretary. The Hosokawa cabinet survived for a year - it managed to pass the 1994 Japanese electoral reform, before Hosokawa resigned following revelations of a campaign finance scandal.

Following Hosokawa's resignation, bickering began over who would succeed him, with every party from the Hosokawa Cabinet eventually picking Tsutomu Hata. The Hata Cabinet was soon after sworn in with a confidence vote; however, just a few days after, the combined forces of the Japan Renewal Party, Kōmeitō, Democratic Socialist Party, Liberal Reform Federation, Japan New Party would form a unified parliamentary group, the "Kaishin", with the goal of undercutting JSP influence in the Hata Cabinet. The group would go on to form the New Frontier Party soon after. Murayama felt betrayed as he was never offered a cabinet position.

On 25 June, the Hata Cabinet resigned en masse, believing they would not survive a confidence vote. Yōhei Kōno soon after entered talks with Murayama on the possibility of a grand coalition; they came to an agreement where Murayama would inherit the Prime Ministership from Hata soon after. However, several LDP heavyweights disagreed with the idea, including Yasuhiro Nakasone and Toshiki Kaifu, who stated that "I cannot bring myself to write the name of Murayama on the ballot". A challenge to Murayama then emerged from Kaifu, who was nominated by rebel LDP members for prime minister. With no majority in the Japanese House of Representatives, a run-off was held between Kaifu and Murayama, which Murayama then won, making him the first Socialist Prime Minister since the LDP had formed in 1955. His rise to become prime minister was described as "sudden and unexpected" by The New York Times.

== Premiership (1994–1996) ==
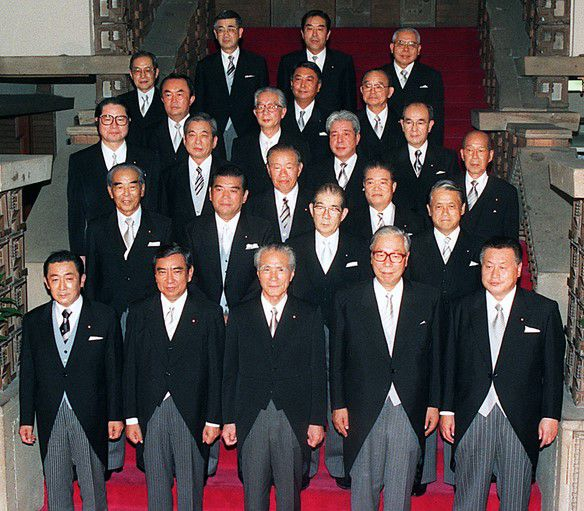
Cabinet of Tomiichi Murayama

The Murayama Cabinet was a coalition government, sometimes described as a grand coalition, which played a significant part in ending the often explosive LDP-JSP conflict which had dominated every election prior, even with third parties beginning to form in the seventies and eighties. The coalition was described by The New York Times as a "lopsided deal that left Mr. Murayama at the mercy of the Liberal Democrats."

In his policy speech after taking office as prime minister, he stated his wish for "people-friendly politics" and "peace of mind politics" as his administrative policies.

=== Murayama Statement ===
At a ceremony commemorating the end of the Pacific War, Murayama announced the "Occasion of the 50th Anniversary of the War's End", an official apology for the "invasion" and "colonial domination" of Asia that Japan undertook before and during the Pacific War and Second Sino-Japanese War. The Prime Minister issued a statement entitled "On the Commemoration of the End of World War II" after a unified Cabinet meeting. All successive cabinets since Murayama have clearly stated that they will follow the statement. The aptly name "Murayama Statement" has become established, and it is treated as the official position of the Japanese government.

==== Reactions to the Murayama Statement ====
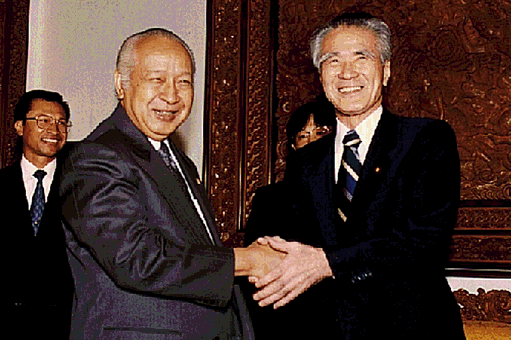
Prime Minister Tomiichi Murayama with Indonesian President Suharto at the Merdeka Palace, Jakarta, Indonesia in 1994

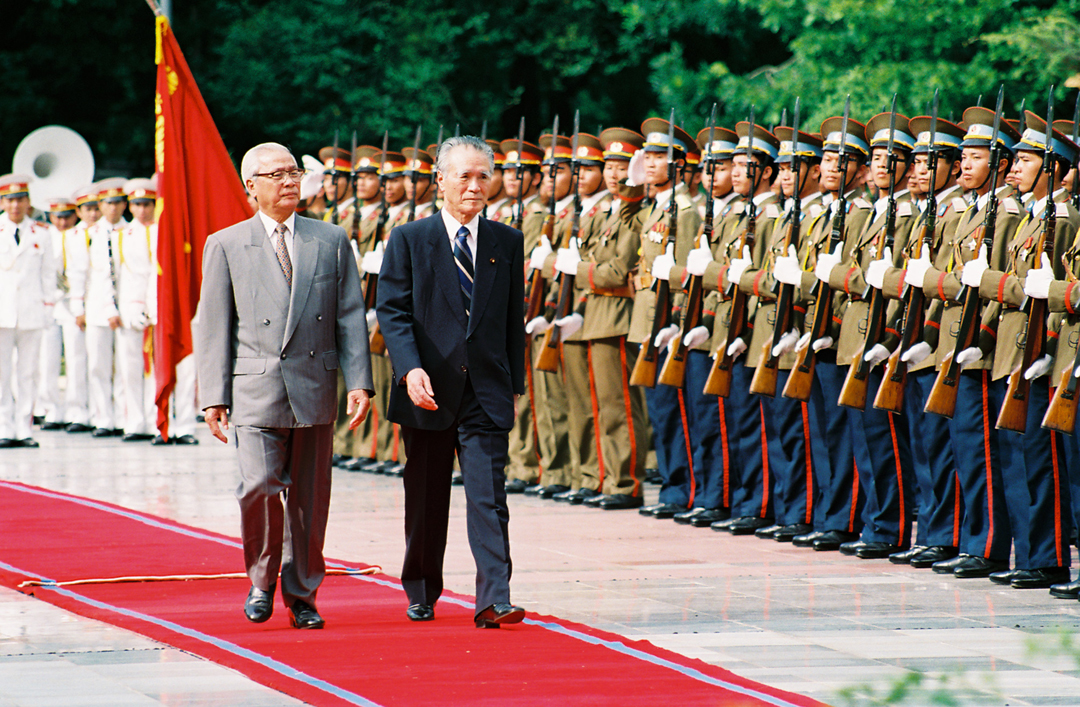
Prime Minister Tomiichi Murayama with Vietnamese Prime Minister Vo Van Kiet in Hanoi, Vietnam, 1994

At the time of his statement, Murayama said he was just "stating the obvious thing". He did not expect that his successor, Ryutaro Hashimoto, would fully respect the statement. All cabinets since have clearly stated their intention to respect the statement.

The Murayama Statement is considered to be the official historical understanding taken by the Japanese government. Junichiro Koizumi also issued the Koizumi Statement on the 60th anniversary of the war's end in 2005, which followed the Murayama Statement.

Conservative politicians and others have made comments which often differ from the Statement with denial for crimes committed by Japan, and for this, they are usually criticized heavily by the governments of China and South Korea. Most undertake the purview that "Japan has officially apologized and compensated the countries concerned for the acts of aggression it allegedly committed during the war, there is no need for further apologies." Others have also stated that the Murayama Statement was pointless, with the fact that Japan committed the acts being something that cannot be helped.

In November 2008, Chief of the Air Staff Toshio Tamogami published a paper titled "Was Japan an Aggressive Nation?". He was heavily criticized by incumbent Prime Minister Tarō Asō for straying from the view established by the Murayama Statement, and was fired, with Tamogami going on to become a significant figure for the far-right in Japan, as displayed by his run in the 2014 Tokyo gubernatorial election.

Before taking office as prime minister, Shinzo Abe had made statements critical of the Murayama Statement, and attention was being drawn both domestically and internationally to see what kind of statement Shinzo Abe would issue in 2015 on the occasion of the 70th anniversary of the end of the war. But on 5 January of the same year, At the New Year's press conference, he stated, "The Abe Cabinet has inherited the positions of previous cabinets, including the Murayama Statement. On that basis, I would like to announce a new, future-oriented statement", making it clear that the Abe Cabinet would at least somewhat respect the Murayama Statement.

=== Establishment of Asian Women's Fund ===
In August 1994, a plan was announced to provide condolence money through private funds to women and families who were forced by Japanese soldiers in World War 2 to work as comfort women. In July 1995, the Asian Women's Fund was established under the jurisdiction of the Prime Minister's Office and the Ministry of Foreign Affairs. Murayama encouraged this. In January 1997, the fund began distributing yen to former Korean comfort women.

Before the establishment of the Murayama Cabinet, lawsuits were filed by former comfort women in various locations demanding state-funded damage compensation and an apology from the Japanese government for its actions. However, the Japanese government took the position that these issues had been resolved when treaties were concluded with other countries, and it was considered impossible to compensate former comfort women through the use of state funds. Under the concept presented by Murayama, the government would establish a fund and the funds would be donated by the private sector, thereby avoiding direct investment of national funds and conveying the sincere feelings of the people who responded to the donations. The aim was to solve the problem, not through the government, but through private organizations. Regarding the background to its establishment, Murayama himself said, "There are those who say, 'There should be government compensation', while others say, 'All wartime reparations have been legally resolved. There is no need to revisit them now.' There is a wide gap in opinion both domestically and internationally, with some saying, 'I paid my dues properly.' we found common ground and managed to launch the fund. As the former comfort women continue to age, we have managed to convey the feelings of apology from the Japanese people while they were still alive, and those who went through heartbreaking experiences. Despite various criticisms, this was the only option available under the pressing circumstances of the time."

Fumibei Hara became the first president of the organization, and Murayama, after retiring as prime minister, became the second acting president. He has been developing projects related to the honor and dignity of women in general. Murayama, the chairman of the board, announced that the group will disband in March 2007, when it is scheduled to develop support projects in the Philippines, the Republic of Korea, and the Republic of China, and conclude its Indonesia operations.

=== Disasters and controversies ===
==== Great Hanshin Earthquake ====
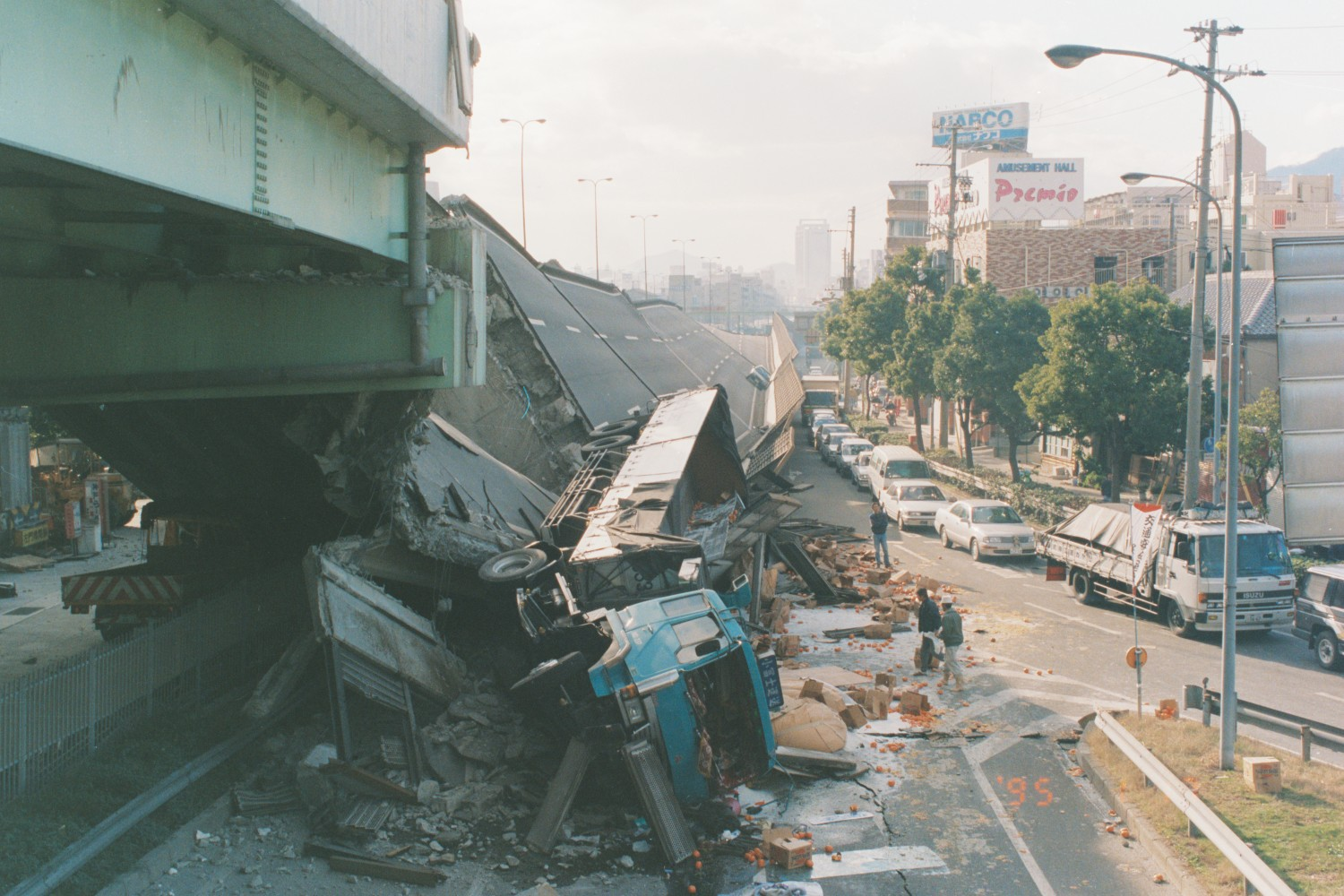
Hanshin Expressway after the Great Hanshin earthquake

On 17 January 1995, the Great Hanshin Earthquake occurred, with the Japanese government being heavily criticized for its delayed response to the Hyōgo Prefecture.

When asked about the reason for the delay in dispatching the Japan Self-Defense Forces to the site of the earthquake, Murayama, who had been relatively popular as a prime minister, received strong criticism from the Japanese opposition and his cabinet approval ratings took a downturn. Eventually, as the full extent of the delayed response became clear, the inadequacies of the Japanese government's crisis management system at the time, including the legal system, were exposed.

The earthquake occurred at around 5:46 a.m., but there was no crisis management employee at the Prime Minister's Office at the time. Furthermore, the National Land Agency, which had jurisdiction over disaster countermeasures, did not have a person on duty. The low loyalty of the Cabinet Secretariat and bureaucrats to the coalition cabinet was pointed out as a problem. After the earthquake, Atsuyuki Sasa, instructed by Masaharu Gotōda, gave a lecture on crisis management to the cabinet. Sasa wrote that Murayama was the only one of the cabinet members who paid attention the entire time, and Sasa reprimanded the cabinet for its distracted behavior. Sasa also wrote about an anecdote where Murayama attempted to hold a press conference immediately after the earthquake, but was halted by Cabinet Secretariat bureaucrats.

Murayama himself said "I think the initial response could have been done more quickly if we had the current crisis management system in place. I cannot bear the shame that so many people died. Every year on the morning of the 7th, I hold a silent prayer at my home." He also said that "There was no crisis management response function at all. There is no excuse for the delay in launching the initial response. Yes, I am truly sorry." He stated further that there was no argument or excuse for the failure in response.

At the time, Nobuo Ishihara, who held a role in the Prime Minister's Office as the longest serving Deputy Chief Cabinet Secretary in Japanese history, said "In this unprecedented and unprecedented disaster, and with an underdeveloped legal system, who else but Murayama could become the Prime Minister? Even so, it was impossible to respond quickly." On the other hand, he also said that "If you look far enough, the cause (of the lack of a system in which the Cabinet could take immediate action) was the Socialist Party. The Socialist Party continued to oppose strengthening the Cabinet's authority. Ironically, when a Prime Minister finally originated from the Socialist Party, a situation occurred where they had to manage the crisis. This was a very difficult situation. It's a story."

==== Coalition weakness ====
The coalition formed by Murayama was intensely controversial. A movement began inside the party urging supporters of the Hata Cabinet, including former Chairman Sadao Yamahana. At a meeting on 16 January, Banri Kaieda and others from the splinter Democratic New Party Club joined the promoters to form a new party. He was scheduled to submit a notification of withdrawal from the group on 17 January. It was thought that the event would be canceled due to the earthquake that occurred that early morning, but Yamahana and others submitted a notice of withdrawal from the group in the morning of the same day. The following day, 18 January, the formation of a new party was postponed, and Yamaka left the Socialist Party on 10 May.

==== Tokyo subway sarin attack ====
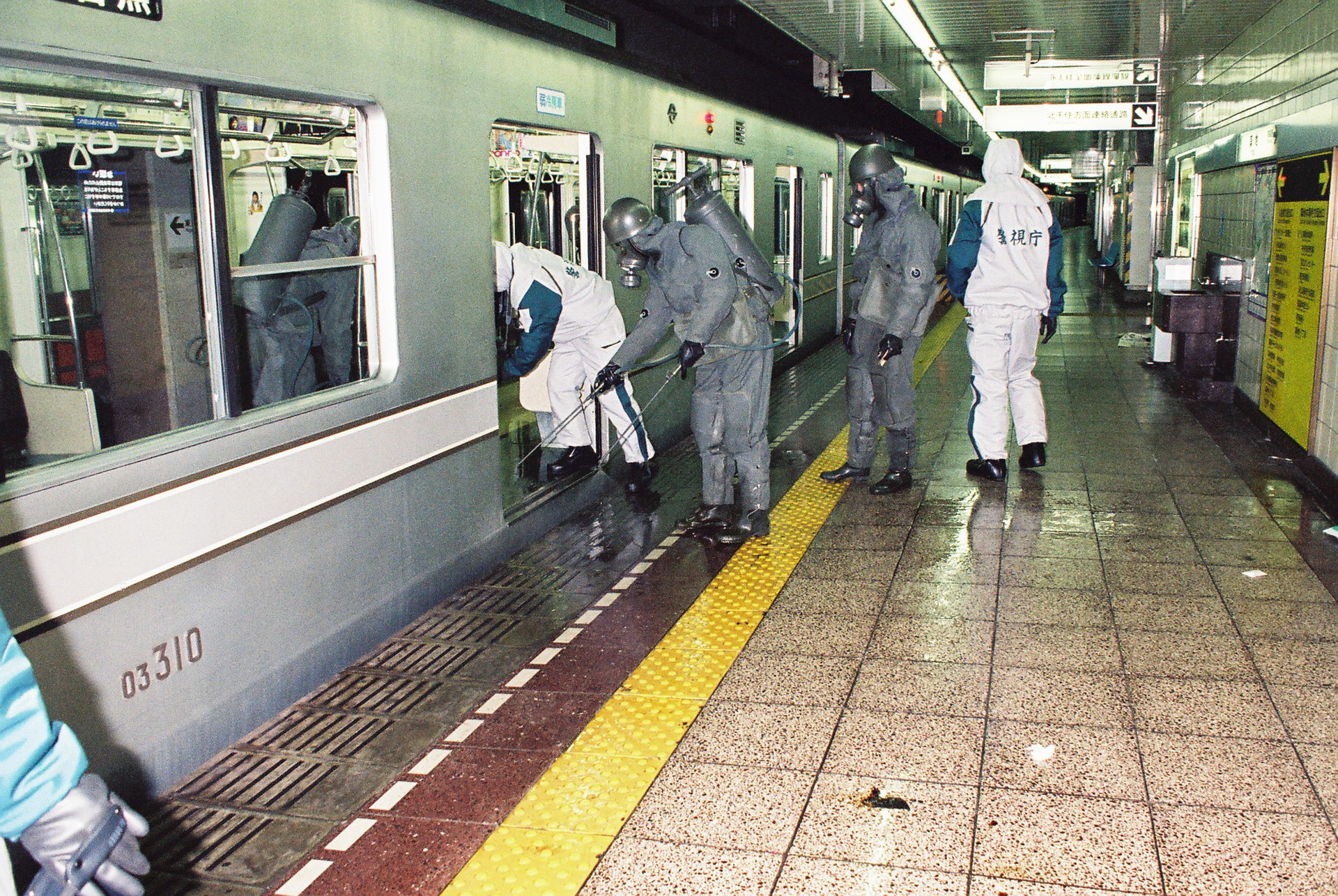
Emergency personnel respond to the Tokyo subway sarin attack

On 20 March 1995, the Tokyo subway sarin attack occurred, the deadliest terrorist attack in Japan as defined by modern standards. Murayama coordinated the response to the attack. After the attack, Murayama held an emergency cabinet meeting and directed the Minister of Transportation to led the investigation and response. His government created a 300-member task force which were tasked to interrogate witnesses and searched for evidence as Murayama appealed for public cooperation. After the attack, he ordered all airports, railroads and ports to be on alert against any further attacks. In response, Murayama made a public plea asking for individuals to come forward with evidence or knowledge of the attack.

==== All Nippon Airways Flight hijacking ====
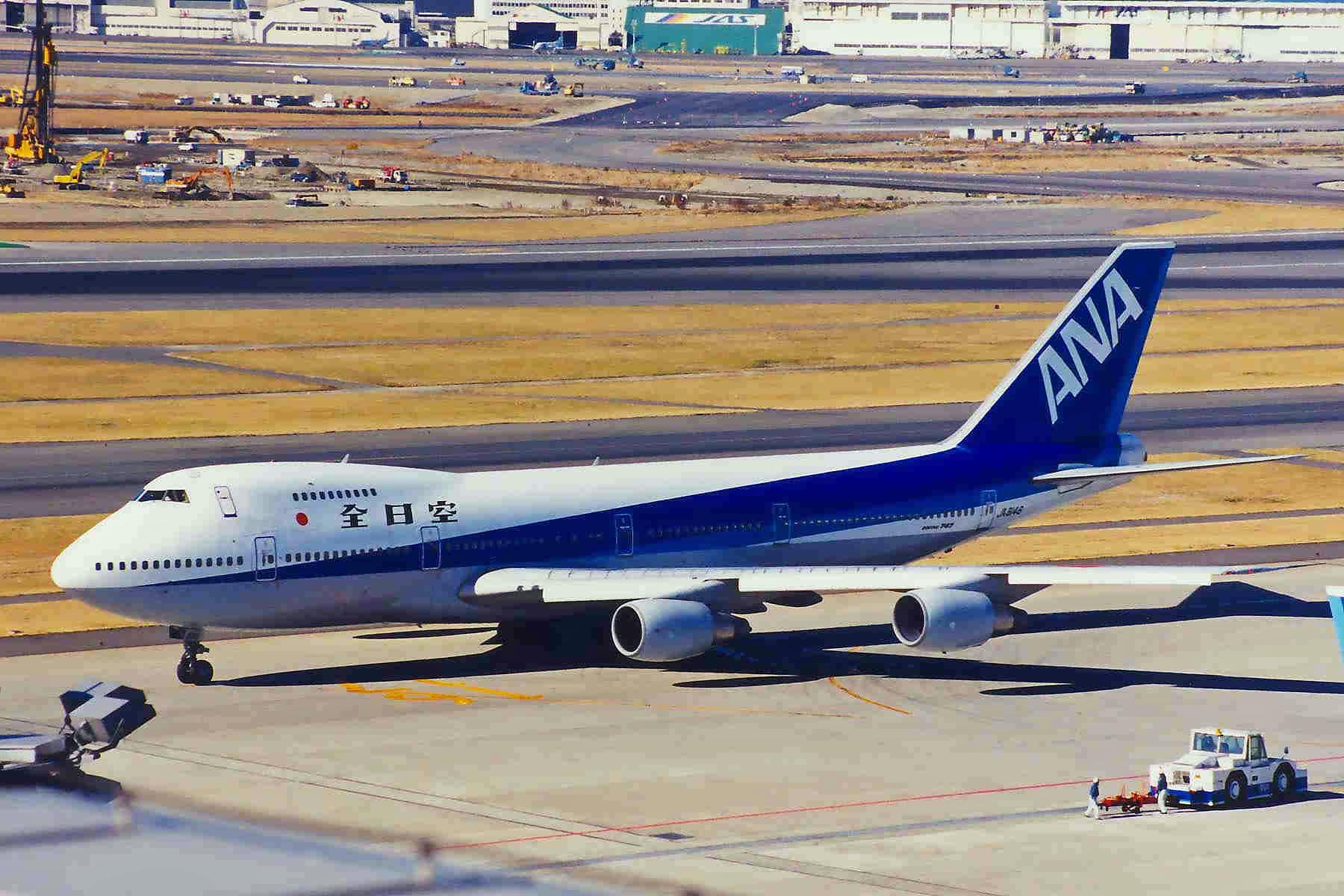
JA8146, the aircraft involved in All Nippon Airways Flight 857 Hijacking incident on June 21, 1995

On 21 June 1995, the All Nippon Airways Flight 857 from Haneda to Hakodate was hijacked. The culprit demanded that the government release Aum Shinrikyo cult leader Shoko Asahara, who had been arrested and detained the month before.

Murayama consulted with Chair of the National Public Safety Commission Hiromu Nonaka and Minister of Transport Shizuka Kamei. He ordered F-15 fighters to dispatch from the Japan Air Self-Defense Force Chitose Base to escort the hijacked aircraft to Hakodate. The following day, Murayama ordered officials to storm aircraft in which Hokkaido and Tokyo police units that had previously been monitoring the aircraft from outside breached the aircraft. The hijacker was arrested, with only him and one passenger injured.

=== Diplomacy ===
==== United States ====
When the Murayama Cabinet was formed, then-president of the United States Bill Clinton was wary of a prime minister from the Socialist Party. During the 20th G7 summit in 1994, after Murayama spoke about his upbringing in a poor fishing village and the process that led him to aspire to become a politician, Clinton appeared to warm up more to Murayama.

On 20 July 1994, in his policy speech at the 130th session of the Diet, he declared that the Self-Defense Forces were constitutional and that the Japan-U.S. Security Treaty would be maintained, changing the policies of the Japan Socialist Party up until then and establishing the Japan-U.S. Security Treaty as fundamental policy. At this time, the manuscript for the speech read, Maintain the Japan-US security arrangement, but in the policy statement, Murayama read it as "We will firmly maintain the Japan-US security arrangement."

In 1995, Murayama would later be invited to the White House, where he and President Clinton gave a joint press conference. However, Japanese-United States relations were considered to be restrained as one of the factors for Murayama's resignation in 1996 was the failing relationship between the two nations.

=== Domestic policy ===
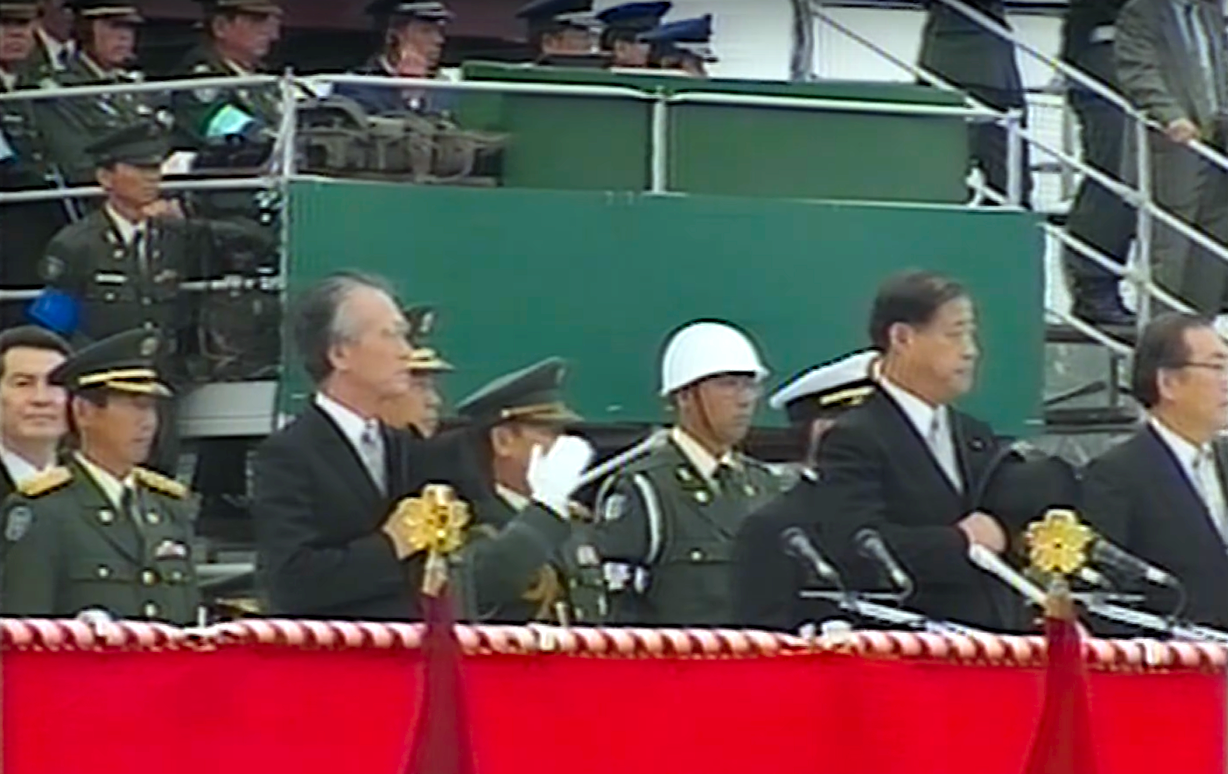
Prime Minister Tomiichi Murayama with Director-General of the Defense Agency Tokuichirō Tamazawa while viewing the Parade of Self-Defense Force at Camp Asaka on October 30, 1994

Nobuo Ishihara, who served as Deputy Chief Cabinet Secretary, said of the Murayama Cabinet, "It dealt with most of the long-pending issues in national politics. It did a great job. Reform, revision of the Self-Defense Forces Act to rescue Japanese nationals, enactment of Atomic Bomb Survivors Relief Act, and enactment of Administrative Reform Act."

==== Enactment of recycling law ====
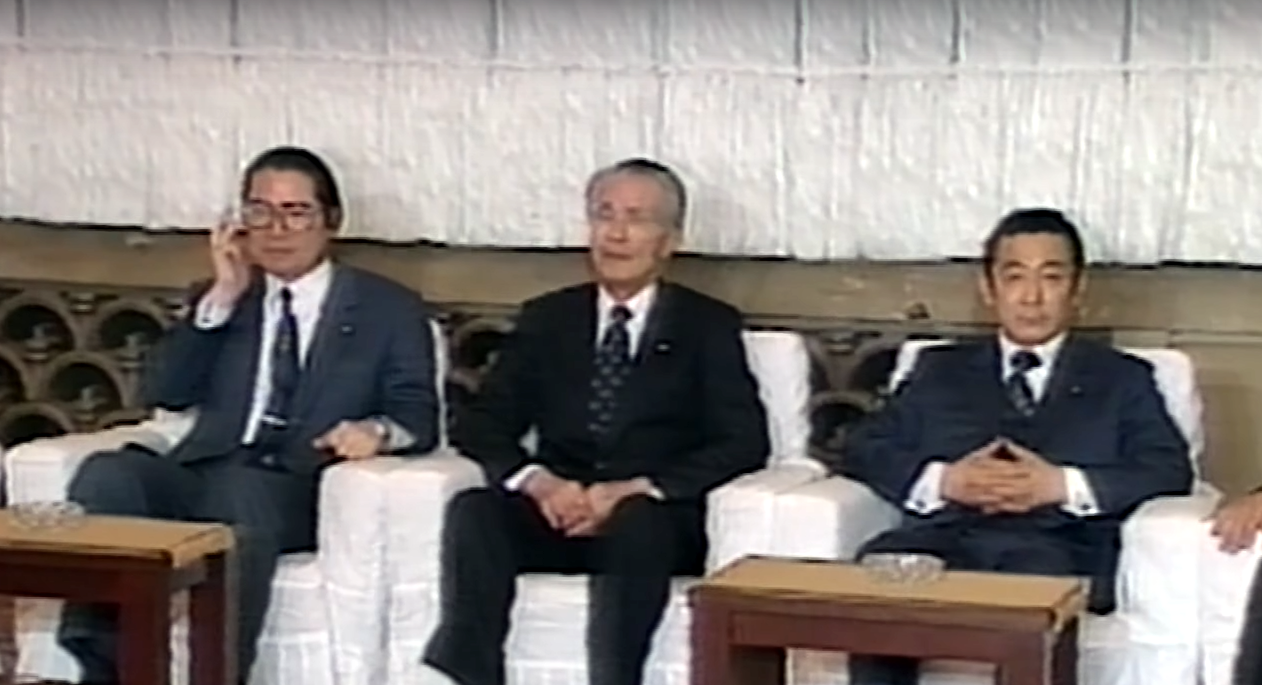
Prime Minister Tomiichi Murayama with Japan Deputy Prime Minister Ryutaro Hashimoto and Director-General of the Defense Agency Seishirō Etō on November 28, 1995

Under Murayama, the Act on Promotion of Separate Collection and Recycling of Containers and Packaging was passed, mandating separate collection of recyclable goods and trash.

==== Narita Airport struggle ====
By the time the Murayama Cabinet took office, the Sanrizuka Struggle had transitioned from violent to more non-violent resistance, although debate was still fierce on both sides. In response to the conclusions of the "Narita Airport Problem Symposium" held 15 times from November 1991 and the "Narita Airport Problem Round Table Conference" held 12 times from September 1993, Murayama decided on this issue in 1995. He apologized fully to the local community for the circumstances surrounding the airport issue. As a result, some landowners appeared willing to acquire land for the second phase of construction. Later, in 1996, a plan was developed to construct a temporary runway avoiding unpurchased land. In addition to the apology from Murayama and other government officials, the hard-line stance of residents opposed to Narita International Airport gradually softened due to repeated efforts by neutral committee members.

==== Selective surname system ====
Murayama was a strong supporter of the introduction of the selective surname system for married couples, allowing them to keep their surnames from before marriage.

==== Strengthening the Prime Minister's Office ====
Upon entering the Prime Minister's Office, Murayama felt a sense of crisis because, with the exception of the prime minister, the chief cabinet secretary, and the deputy chief cabinet secretary, all staff at the Prime Minister's Office were career bureaucrats. "The Prime Minister's Office is not just an office that conducts administration, but also an office that makes political decisions." The post of "Assistant to the Prime Minister" was created for this reason. The Prime Minister's assistants were chosen from among the Diet members belonging to the three ruling parties, with Hidenao Nakagawa, Masaru Hayakawa, Jun Nishikori, and Saburo Toida all being appointed to the office. The appointed assistant to the prime minister was in charge of providing opinions on the prime minister's speeches and answers, as well as gathering information on political issues. The post of "Aide to the Prime Minister" was considered a personal advisor to the prime minister, but the Cabinet Act was later amended and the post of "Aide to the Prime Minister" was legislated to be more political in nature.

=== Resignation ===
As part of his party's coalition deal which included a rotational prime minister, Murayama announced his intent to resign as prime minister on 5 January 1996. The move allowed the Liberal Democratic Party leader Ryutaro Hashimoto to become Murayama's successor. Eventually, Murayama would go on to retire from politics overall in 2000.

== Later life and death ==
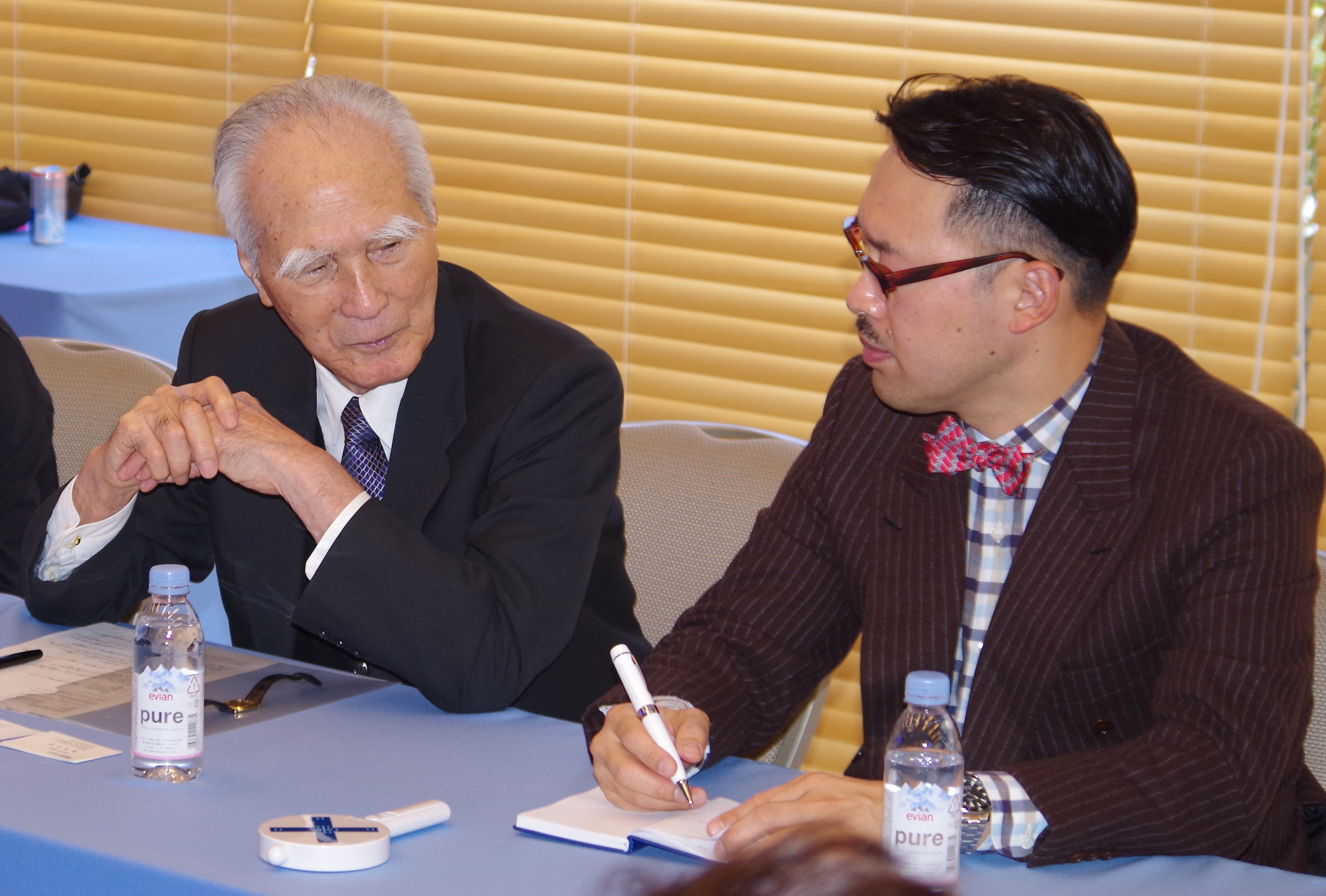
Murayama with Yoshihiko Okabe in 2015

In 2000, Murayama retired from politics. He and Mutsuko Miki traveled to North Korea in 2000 to promote better bilateral relations between the two countries.

Murayama was also known in his later years for his bushy eyebrows, telling reporters "I don't care about my appearance. Natural is best", having grown his eyebrows since 1985.

Murayama became the president of the Asian Women's Fund, a quasi-government body that was set up to provide compensation for former comfort women. After providing compensation and working on various projects, the fund was dissolved on 31 March 2007.

Murayama turned 100 on 3 March 2024 and lived in Oita until his death. He died on 17 October 2025 at a hospital in Oita, at the age of 101. His wife of 71 years, Yoshie, died in 2024, also aged 101. He was survived by two children, two grandchildren and five great-grandchildren.

== Legacy ==
After his death, The New York Times noted that his televised address on the 50 year anniversary of Japan's surrender in World War II helped "set a marker for his country's 'deep remorse' over wartime atrocities'. The New York Times also hailed Murayama for having "gone further than any previous Japanese leader in expressing regrets for the killing, torture and rape of millions of civilians and other atrocities in countries Japan occupied during the war". Murayama's national apology was said to be "the standard for subsequent [Japanese] leaders". His successors would go on to phrases such as "deep remorse" and "heartfelt apology", words that Murayama used, when marking the 60th and 70th World War II anniversaries.

Chinese spokesperson for the Foreign Minister Lin Jian called Murayama "a politician with a strong sense of justice" and acknowledged how his government held a positive impact between Japan-China relations. President of South Korea Lee Jae Myung credited Murayama for making "exceptional efforts toward reconciliation and co-prosperity with neighboring countries" during his time as prime minister.

Reacting to his death, Social Democratic Party Chairwoman Mizuho Fukushima called Murayama the "father of Japanese politics".

Through his efforts in establishing the Asian Women's Fund, the organization was credited for bringing comfort women into the national and global stage, something that Murayama advocated for. In part for his work with the Asian Women's Fund, the United Nations Commission on Human Rights issued statements in support of the women. Years later, Secretary General Ban Ki-moon invited one of the comfort women survivors to the United Nations headquarters in New York to address their experiences.

== Honours ==
- Senior Second Rank (2025)
- Grand Cordon of the Supreme Order of the Chrysanthemum (2025)
- Grand Cordon of the Order of the Paulownia Flowers (2006)

== See also ==
- Fusen Ketsugi
- Murayama Cabinet
- The Nobel Peace Prize for Article 9 of the Japanese Constitution

Political offices
Preceded by Tsutomu Hata	Prime Minister of Japan; 1994–1996	Succeeded by Ryutaro Hashimoto
Party political offices
Position established	Chairman of the Social Democratic Party of Japan; 1996	Succeeded by Takako Doi
Preceded by Sadao Yamahana	Chairman of the Japan Socialist Party; 1993–1996	Position abolished
Preceded by Shun Ōide	Chairman of the Diet Affairs Committee, Japan Socialist Party; 1991–1993	Succeeded by Koken Nosaka
Diplomatic posts
Preceded by Suharto	Chairperson of APEC; 1995	Succeeded by Fidel Ramos
