= Proletarian parties in Japan, 1925–1932 =

List of proletarian political parties in Japan (1925-1932)

The proletarian parties were a group of left-wing political parties in Japan. Several proletarian parties were launched after enactment of the Universal Manhood Suffrage Law in 1925.

== Early history (1925-27) ==
=== Three major parties ===
Three major proletarian parties emerged during 1926, all closely linked to trade unions active in Japan. The tension and divisions between individual trade unions were largely replicated in divisions between the three major proletarian parties.

- The pro-communist trade union Hyōgikai (Council of Labour Unions of Japan) backed the Labour-Farmer Party (労働農民党, Rōdōnōmintō). The Labour-Farmer Party was considered to be the most left-wing of the three parties and existed until 1928, when it was banned by the imperial government.
- The Japan Labour Union League, a moderate trade union, backed the similarly-named Japan Labour-Farmer Party (日本労農党, Nihonrōnōtō). The Japan Labour-Farmer Party occupied a centrist position among the three parties.
- The moderate Sodomei trade union centre backed the Social Democratic Party (社会民衆党, Shakai Minshū-tō). The Social Democratic Party was the most relatively right-wing of the three parties.

=== Other early proletarian parties ===
All three of these parties were constructed on the notion of a worker–peasant class alliance. In addition to these parties, there was also a party called the Japan Farmers Party that differentiated themselves by declaring themselves a party 'by farmers, for farmers', rather than presenting themselves as an urban worker-rural peasant alliance. Additionally, there were also some local proletarian parties.

Additionally, a party called the "Farmer-Labour Party" (not to be confused with the similarly-named Labour-Farmer Party or Japan Labour-Farmer Party) was founded in December 1925, but banned after only two hours of existence after being accused of being a communist outfit.

== Electoral performance (1927-28) ==
=== 1927 preferectural elections ===
The proletarian parties took part in the 1927 prefectural assembly elections, and their participation was closely watched. Together they had launched 216 candidates, out of whom 28 were elected (representing 1.9% of the elected assembly members).

The Labour-Farmer Party garnered most of its vote from rural areas, whilst the Social Democratic Party and the regional proletarian parties got most of their votes from urban areas. The Labour-Farmer Party won 13 seats, the Japan Farmers Party four seats, the Social Democratic Party three seats, the Japan Labour-Farmers Party three seats and different local proletarian parties five seats.

=== 1928 national election ===
In the 1928 national Diet election, roughly half of the urban votes for proletarian parties went to the Social Democratic Party whilst roughly half of the rural votes for the proletarian parties went to the Labour-Farmer Party. The proletarian parties managed to win eight seats in the Diet. Overall, the election result was disappointing for the proletarian parties. Many of their prominent leaders failed to get elected.

There are different possible explanations to the limited success of proletarian parties in 1928. They lacked the lavish electoral campaign budgets of the established parties. Nor were their leaders, with a few notable exceptions, very well known. Moreover, socialist ideas and movements were treated with a great deal of suspicion by many Japanese voters, limited the appeal of the proletarian parties.

Furthermore, the electoral campaigns of the proletarian parties suffered from direct sabotage by state authorities. Police wound disperse electoral meetings, or arrest campaign workers arbitrarily.

Considering the fact that each constituency elected 3 to 5 parliamentarians, the fierce competition between the different proletarian parties often resulted in none of them getting elected. Noticing the lack of coordination as an inherent weakness of the proletarian parties, the Social Democratic Party took the initiative to form a joint parliamentary committee.

== Creation of new parties and setbacks (1928-35) ==
In July 1928, the Proletarian Masses Party was formed, by one former Labour-Farmer Party faction. In December 1928 the Japan Labour-Farmer Party, the Proletarian Masses Party, the Japan Farmers Party and four regional political parties merged, forming the Japan Masses Party.

=== Oyama Ikuo and the Labour-Farmer Masses Party ===
In 1929, Labour-Farmer Party leader Oyama Ikuo faced criticism from a former associate, Mizutani Chozaburo, for being too open towards a merger with the centrist sectors of the socialist movement. Mizutani founded the Labour-Farmer Masses Party in January 1929 and saw its appeal largely confined to Kyoto. In response, Oyama and his followers founded the New Labour-Farmer Party in November 1929.

Mizutani's new party helped form an alliance of left-wing parties called the United Proletarian Party Front in 1929. The party then merged with the Tokyo Proletarian Party, forming the National Conference for a United Proletarian Party which in turn merged with other parties on July 20, 1930, founding the Zenkoku Taishūtō.

=== 1930 national election and decline ===
The 1930 Diet election was a further set-back for the proletarian parties, only winning five seats; two from the Japan Masses Party (Asahara Kenzo and Matsutani Yojiro), two from the Social Democratic Party (Nishio and Katayama) and Oyama Ikuo from the New Labour-Farmer Party.

The Social Democratic Party later merged with the National Labour-Farmer Masses Party in July 1932, forming the Shakai Taishūtō.

== Approach to imperialism ==
The proletarian parties mostly condemned the 1931 Mukden Incident and the resulting Japanese invasion. However, they did so in varying degrees. The Social Democratic Party was more candid in its condemnations of the Incident. Notably, the main backer of the Social Democratic Party, Sodomei, did not oppose the Incident.
