= Rikizō Hirano =

- 平野 力三
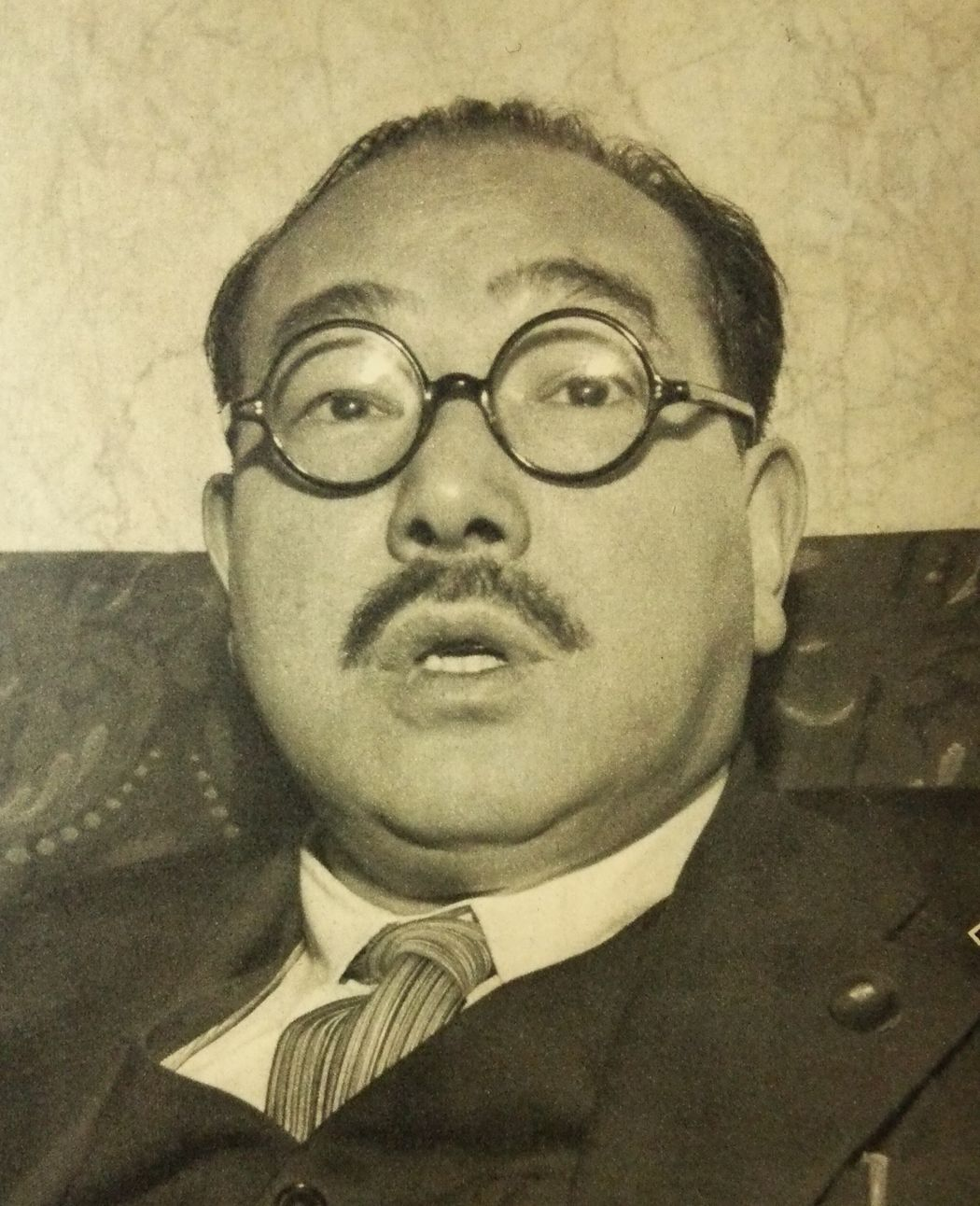
- Hirano in 1954

Minister of Agriculture and Forestry
- In office 1 June 1947 – 4 November 1947
- Preceded by: Kozaemon Kimura
- Succeeded by: Kanae Hatano

Member of the House of Representatives
- In office 20 February 1936 – 4 February 1948
- Constituency: Yamanashi at-large district
- In office 1 October 1952 – 24 January 1955

Personal details
- Born: 5 November 1898 Yamato Village, Gujō District, Gifu Prefecture, Japan (now Gujō, Gifu)
- Died: 17 December 1981 (aged 83)
- Party: Japan Farmers Party (1926–1928); Japan Masses Party (1928–1929); Japan National Socialist Party (1932–); Kōdōkai (Imperial Way Society); Imperial Rule Assistance Political Association and related wartime organisations Japan Socialist Party (postwar); Social Reform Party; Cooperative Party; Right wing of the Japan Socialist Party; Independent (final)
- Spouse: Shigeko Hirano (member of the House of Councillors)
- Relatives: Hirano Masukichi (elder brother); Saburō Hirano (nephew; former Governor of Gifu Prefecture); Tatsuru Uchida (relative by marriage); Hirano Rikiya (great-grandson; won the Yomiuri Shimbun Award at the 61st National Elementary and Junior High School Essay Contest with the essay Tenpen no Tsuki about the young Rikizō Hirano)
- Education: Takushoku University (Chinese language course); Waseda University (Department of Political Science and Economics)
- Awards: Order of the Rising Sun, 2nd Class, Gold and Silver Star; Junior Third Rank (posthumous)

Rikizō Hirano (平野 力三, Hirano Rikizō; 5 November 1898 – 17 December 1981) was a Japanese farmers’ movement activist and politician. He held the rank of Junior Third Rank.

Originally a national socialist, he later became a leader of the anti-capitalist, anti-fascist and anti-communist farmers’ movement. Known as a “political schemer” for his involvement in the founding of numerous parties, he continued as a member of the House of Representatives after the war and served as Minister of Agriculture and Forestry in the Katayama Cabinet.

His elder brother was Hirano Masukichi. His wife, Shigeko Hirano, was a member of the House of Councillors for the Japan Socialist Party. Their second daughter, Yoshiko Hirano, became the second wife of the impresario Akira Jin (known as a “yobiyā”). Their third daughter, Teruko Hirano, was active in the Democratic Socialist Party. Saburō Hirano, who served as a Liberal Democratic Party member of the House of Representatives and later as Governor of Gifu Prefecture, was his nephew.

== Biography ==
Hirano was born on 5 November 1898 in Yamato Village, Gujō District, Gifu Prefecture (present-day Gujō City). After studying in the Chinese language course at Takushoku University (graduating in 1920), he graduated from the Department of Political Science and Economics at Waseda University in 1923.

Through the Builders’ League (Kensetsusha Dōmei), he led the farmers’ movement in Yamanashi Prefecture and became secretary of the Yamanashi Prefectural Federation of the Japan Farmers’ Union (Nichinō) in 1924. Opposing the leftward shift of the Japan Farmers’ Union, he left it in 1926, founded the All-Japan Farmers’ Union Alliance (Zennihon Nōmin Kumiai Dōmei) and became its president. In October of the same year he independently founded the Japan Farmers Party and became its secretary-general.

He was involved in the founding of the Social Democratic Party (Shakai Minshūtō) but clashed with Isoo Abe. In 1928 the Japan Farmers’ Party merged with the Japan Labour-Farmer Party to form the Japan Masses Party, of which Hirano became secretary-general. After it was revealed that he had received a substantial sum from Prime Minister Giichi Tanaka in exchange for supporting the government bill in the 56th Imperial Diet (while the government was dealing with the Zhang Zuolin assassination and related issues), he was expelled on 16 May 1929 together with four other leaders as a disruptor of party discipline.

He maintained close relations with military leaders such as Tanaka and Kazushige Ugaki. In 1932 he organised the Japan National Socialist Party. Promoting cooperation between reservists’ groups and farmers, he founded the Kōdōkai (Imperial Way Society) in 1933 and became a standing director. In the 19th general election of 1936 he was elected from the Yamanashi at-large district as a Kōdōkai candidate. He was subsequently re-elected a total of seven times.

After the 22nd general election for members of the House of Representatives in April 1946, the elected members of the Japan Socialist Party gathered inside the Diet building.Front row from the left: Ryōji Inoue, Ushirō Itō, Komakichi Matsuoka, Suehiro Nishio, Tetsu Katayama, Chōzaburō Mizutani, Eiji Tomiyoshi. Middle row from the left: Mitsusuke Yonekubo, Masaru Nomizo, Kanjū Katō, Tatsuo Morito, Rikizō Hirano, Mosaburō Suzuki, Kiyoshi Masaki, Hisao Kuroda. Back row from the left: Kanson Arahata, Ryōzō Katō, Junzō Matsumoto, Yoshio Suzuki, one person skipped, Inejirō Asanuma, Yoshio Matsunaga.

After the war he participated in the founding of the Japan Socialist Party. Within the party he belonged to the right wing and served as a standing member of the Central Executive Committee. In February 1947 he founded the National Farmers’ Union (Zenkoku Nōmin Kumiai), advocating the “three antis” of anti-capitalism, anti-fascism and anti-communism.

When the Japan Socialist Party became the largest party in the 23rd general election of 1947 and the Katayama Cabinet was formed, he entered the cabinet as Minister of Agriculture and Forestry. He clashed with Chief Cabinet Secretary Suehiro Nishio and was dismissed—the first dismissal of a cabinet minister under the Constitution of Japan.

On 13 January 1948 the Central Public Office Qualification Examination Committee decided that Hirano fell under the purge ordinance. In February a Japanese court issued a provisional disposition ruling that he did not fall under the purge, but under pressure from GHQ the purge was confirmed on the grounds that it was an extra-legal measure beyond the reach of Japanese judicial decisions (the Hirano Incident). Dissatisfied with this, the Hirano faction became uncooperative toward the Katayama Cabinet; sixteen members left the Japan Socialist Party on 17 February and founded the Social Reform Party (Shakai Kakushintō). The series of events surrounding the purge is also said to have been entangled in the conflict between the GHQ Government Section and former Prime Minister Shigeru Yoshida. (Note: As a result of this incident the Katayama Cabinet lost momentum and became a short-lived administration. Government Section Deputy Chief Charles Louis Kades and others worked to prevent Yoshida’s return to power by supporting the formation of the Ashida Cabinet, but that cabinet also collapsed due to the Showa Denko scandal, leading to the formation of the Second Yoshida Cabinet.)

After the purge was lifted on 13 October 1950 he returned to politics. In 1951 he founded the Social Democratic Party (Shakai Minshutō) and became its chairman; the following year it merged with the Farmers’ Cooperative Party to form the Cooperative Party (Kyōdōtō), of which he remained chairman. In October 1952 he joined the Right Socialist Party of Japan.

However, because of his involvement as an adviser in the Hozen Keizaikai incident (保全経済会事件), he was questioned in 1954. In February he was summoned as a witness before the House of Representatives and testified, based on statements by the association’s president Masutomi Itō, that political contributions had been made via Hirozen Hirokawa of the Liberal Party to Hayato Ikeda and Eisaku Satō (30 million yen), to Mamoru Shigemitsu and Yuima Ōasa of the Reform Party (20 million yen), and to Ichirō Hatoyama and Bukichi Miki (10 million yen). Taking responsibility, he left the Right Socialist Party. He ran as an independent in the 1955 general election but was defeated.

He subsequently ran unsuccessfully in the 1956 House of Councillors election, the 1958 general election and the 1967 general election.

After retiring from politics he became president of the Nikan Nōgyō Shinbun (Daily Agricultural Newspaper).

In the 1970s he requested declassified internal GHQ documents from the United States National Archives, claiming that his purge had been unjust. He petitioned President Jimmy Carter for restoration of honour and 200 million yen in compensation; Carter expressed regret and the U.S. Senate passed a resolution restoring his honour.

In the spring of 1969 he was awarded the Order of the Rising Sun, 2nd Class, Gold and Silver Star.

He died on 17 December 1981 at the age of 83. The following day he was posthumously awarded the Junior Third Rank by special imperial decree.

== Selected works ==
- Shakai shichō jukkō: Kensetsusha Dōmei kōenshū (社会思潮十講 建設者同盟講演集; Ten Lectures on Social Thought: Lectures of the Builders’ Alliance), edited, Dōjinsha Shoten, 1922
- Nōchi kokka kanri hōan (農地国家管理法案; Bill for State Management of Agricultural Land), Nōchi Seido Kaikaku Dōmei, 1941
- Nihon nōgyō seisaku to nōchi mondai (日本農業政策と農地問題; Japanese Agricultural Policy and the Land Problem), Ichisugi Shoten, 1943
- Hirano Rikizō Kokkai katsudō hōkoku: Watashi wa nōmin no tame ni kaku tatakatta (平野力三国会活動報告 私は農民の為に斯く斗った; Report on Rikizō Hirano’s Diet Activities: Thus I Fought for the Farmers), Zenkoku Nōmin Kumiai Sōhonbu, 1953
- Nihon nōgyō no shinrosen: Kengyō honmei e no michi (日本農業の新路線 兼業本命への道; A New Course for Japanese Agriculture: The Path toward Part-time Farming as the Mainstay), Nikan Nōgyō Shinbunsha, 1971
- Nōchi kaikaku tōsō no rekishi (農地改革闘争の歴史; History of the Struggle for Land Reform), Nikan Nōgyō Shinbunsha, 1972

=== Memorial volume ===
- Hiun no nōshō: Hirano Rikizō – Moto Nōrin Daijin Hirano Rikizō sensei tsuisōroku (悲運の農相・平野力三 元農林大臣・平野力三先生追想録; The Ill-Fated Agriculture Minister Rikizō Hirano: Reminiscences of Former Minister of Agriculture and Forestry Rikizō Hirano), Hirano Rikizō Tsuisōroku Kankōkai, 1982

== See also ==
- Hirano Incident

Political offices
Preceded by Kozaemon Kimura	Minister of Agriculture and Forestry; 1947	Succeeded by Kanae Hatano
