= Japan Socialist Party (disambiguation) =

The Japan Socialist Party (日本社会党, Nihon Shakai-tō) was a major Japanese political party that existed from 1945 to 1996.

Japan Socialist Party may also refer to:

== Current political parties ==
- New Socialist Party of Japan (新社会党, Shin Shakai-tō), a political party established in 1996

== Historical political parties ==
- Leftist Socialist Party of Japan (左派社会党, Saha Shakai-tō), a political party that existed from 1948 to 1955 after a split in the Japan Socialist Party
- Rightist Socialist Party of Japan (右派社会党, Uha Shakai-tō), a political party that existed from 1948 to 1955 after a split in the Japan Socialist Party
- Democratic Socialist Party (Japan), either (民主社会党, Minshu Shakai-tō) or (民社党, Minsha-tō), a political party that existed from 1960 to 1994
- Japan Socialist Party (1906) (日本社会党, Nihon Shakai-tō), a political party that existed from 1906 to 1907
- Japan Labour-Farmer Party (日本労農党, Nihon Rōnōtō), a political party that existed from 1926 to 1928
- Labour-Farmer Party (労働農民党, Rōdōnōmintō) a political party that existed from 1926 to 1928
- Socialist Masses Party (社会大衆党, Shakai Taishūtō), a political party that existed from 1932 to 1940
- Japan Proletarian Party (日本無産党, Nihon Musantō), a political party that existed for nine months in 1937

== See also ==
- Social Democratic Party (Japan) (disambiguation)
