= Proletarian Party =

Proletarian Party may refer to:

- Proletarian Catalan Party, a political party in Catalonia, Spain
- Proletarian Liberation Party, a political party in Brazil
- Proletarian Masses Party, a short-lived political party in Japan
- Proletarian parties in Japan, 1925–1932, a group of political parties in Japan
- Proletarian Nationalist Party, a political party in Peru
- Proletarian Party of Peru, a communist party in Peru
- Proletarian Party of America, a communist party in the United States, 1920–1971
- Proletarian Party (Murba), a defunct national communist political party in Indonesia
- Pattali Makkal Katchi (lit. 'Proletarian People's Party'), a political party in Tamil Nadu, India
- Purba Banglar Sarbahara Party, a Bangladeshi communist party
