= Mosaburō Suzuki =

Japanese politician (1893–1970)

- 鈴木 茂三郎
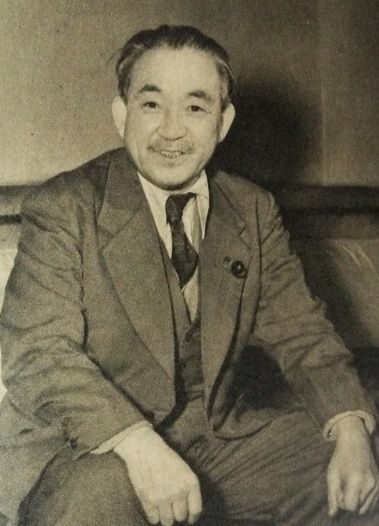
- Suzuki in 1953

Chairman of the Japan Socialist Party
- In office 13 October 1955 – 23 March 1960
- Preceded by: Tetsu Katayama (1950)
- Succeeded by: Inejirō Asanuma

Chairman of the Left Socialist Party of Japan
- In office 19 January 1951 – 12 October 1955
- Preceded by: Position established
- Succeeded by: Position abolished

Member of the House of Representatives
- In office 11 April 1946 – 27 December 1966
- Preceded by: Constituency established
- Succeeded by: Masahiro Yamamoto
- Constituency: Tokyo 2nd (1946–1947); Tokyo 3rd (1947–1966)

Personal details
- Born: 7 February 1893 Gamagōri, Aichi, Japan
- Died: 7 May 1970 (aged 77) Tokyo, Japan
- Party: Socialist
- Other political affiliations: PMP (1928); JMP (1928–1929); JPP (1937); LSP (1951–1955)
- Education: Waseda University
- Occupation: Journalist, essayist, politician

Mosaburō Suzuki (鈴木 茂三郎, Suzuki Mosaburō; February 7, 1893 – May 7, 1970) was a Japanese journalist, essayist, and socialist politician who served nine terms in the House of Representatives. He was the first chairman of the Left Socialist Party of Japan (1951–1955) and later the second chairman of the reunified Japan Socialist Party (1955–1960).

Born into poverty in Gamagōri, Aichi, Suzuki worked various odd jobs before graduating from Waseda University in 1916. As a newspaper reporter he covered the Siberian Intervention, an experience that reinforced his lifelong opposition to militarism. In the interwar period he became a leading figure in the proletarian movement, joined the newly founded Japanese Communist Party in 1922, helped organize several left-wing parties, and was repeatedly arrested under the Peace Preservation Law, including during the Popular Front Incident of 1937. He spent the war years in prison without trial.

After Japan's surrender, he helped found the Japan Socialist Party. He was elected to the Diet in 1946 and became party secretary in 1949. When the party split over the San Francisco Peace Treaty in 1951, he became the first chairman of the Left Socialist Party. In his inaugural speech as its chairman he delivered the widely quoted pacifist appeal "Young men, do not take up arms. Women, do not send your husbands and children to the battlefield." After the socialists reunited in 1955 he served as chairman of the unified JSP until his resignation in 1960 following the formation of the Democratic Socialist Party. In later years he continued to push the party leftward, opposed structural-reform theories, and established a socialist library that was later donated to the Museum of Modern Japanese Literature. He retired from electoral politics before the 1967 election and died in Tokyo in 1970.

== Early life and education ==
Mosaburō Suzuki was born on 7 February 1893, in Gamagōri, Aichi Prefecture. His family was poor, and he worked as a newspaper boy, shined shoes, and pulled rickshaws. He graduated with a degree in political economy at Waseda University in 1916. He worked as a newspaper reporter and covered the Japanese intervention in Siberia.

He then became a journalist, working for the Hōchi Shimbun, Taishō Nichinichi Shimbun and Tokyo Nichi Nichi Shimbun (predecessor of the Mainichi Shimbun), mainly in the economics section. In 1918 he was sent as a special correspondent to Siberia, where he witnessed military intrigues surrounding the Siberian Intervention; this experience strengthened his lifelong opposition to militarism.

== Activism ==
Suzuki moved to the United States in 1919, where he met Sen Katayama and Tsunao Inomata, who were both Leninists. He went to the Soviet Union as a correspondent for Yomiuri Shimbun in 1921, and returned to Japan in 1922. He unsuccessfully tried to organize miners in Kyushu. In 1922, he became a member of the newly-founded Japanese Communist Party (JCP). He became an economic expert for Tokyo Nichi Nichi Shimbun, but was fired in 1928 for being too political. Suzuki was selected to serve as Secretary General of the Proletarian Masses Party in 1928. The party was a reconstitution of the Labour-Farmer Party, which was dissolved after the March 15 incident.

As Japan became increasingly militarist, Suzuki devoted most of his energies to the socialist movement starting around 1928. With Kanjū Katō, he formed the Proletarian Workers' Conference in 1936 and the Japan Proletarian Party in 1937. However, Suzuki became an increasingly prominent target of the government, and he was arrested in 1937 under the Peace Preservation Law as part of the Popular Front Incident. Suzuki was elected to the Tokyo Metropolitan Assembly in 1937. He was arrested again after Japan declared war on the United States and was imprisoned for a trial that never occurred.

== Political career ==
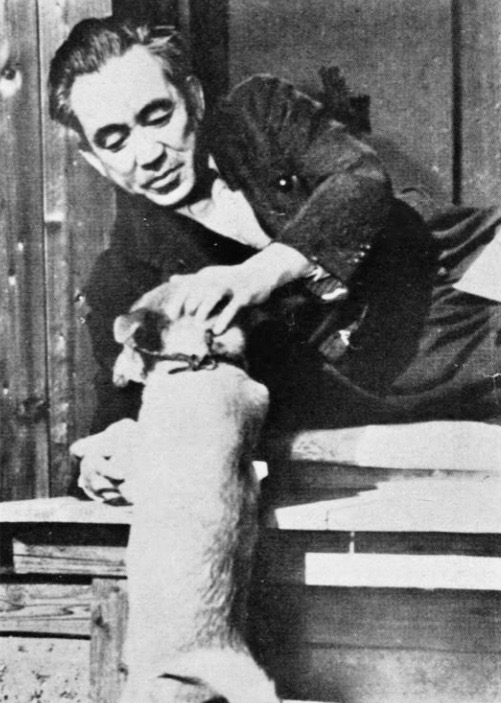
Suzuki in 1951

Following Japan's surrender in 1945, Suzuki participated in the formation of the Japan Socialist Party. In 1946, he won a seat in the House of Representatives; he became party secretary in 1949 and chairman in 1951. As chairman of the lower house's Budget Committee in 1948, Suzuki passed a veto over Katayama Tetsu's proposed budget, which later led to the downfall of the cabinet. Later, in his inaugural speech as party chairman, he famously said "Young men, do not take up arms. Women, do not send your husbands and children to the battlefield" which caused a huge political stir and became a rallying cry of the pacifist movement in Japan, although it was only intended to rebuke Prime Minister Yoshida Shigeru's attempt to secure aid from the United States to rebuild the military of Japan.

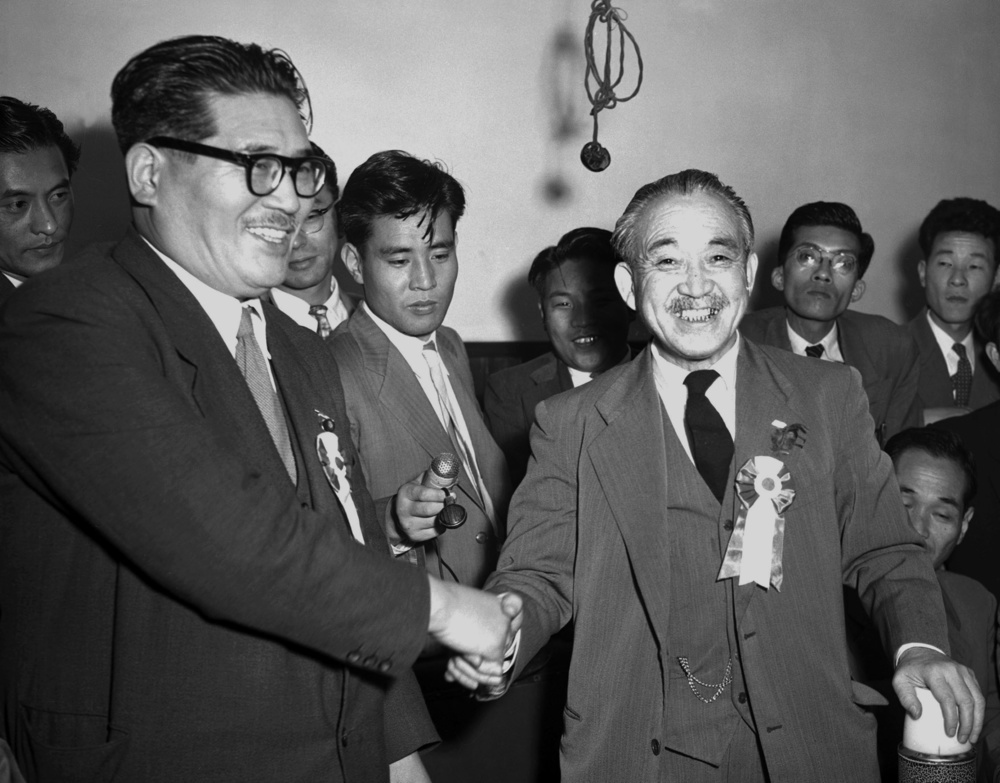
On 13 October 1955, the left-wing and right-wing Socialist parties were reunited. Inejirō Asanuma was elected secretary-general and Suzuki was elected chairman.

When the party split over the San Francisco Peace Treaty in 1951, Suzuki became chairman of the Left Socialist Party. The left increased its seats dramatically in the 1955 election (to 89). On 13 October 1955 the two socialist parties reunited; Suzuki was elected chairman of the unified Japan Socialist Party and Inejirō Asanuma secretary-general. He resigned in March 1960 after the formation of the Democratic Socialist Party by the right wing under Suehiro Nishio.

The two socialist parties reunited that year to form a united front against the emerging right-wing conservative Liberal Democratic Party, but the issue of whether or not to participate in the Anpo protests reignited the left-right tension within the Socialist Party. In 1960, right-wing leader Suehiro Nishio left the party and formed the Democratic Socialist Party. Taking responsibility for the party split, Suzuki resigned as chairman.

During the 1960s, Suzuki gradually pressed the Socialist Party to the left, but it continued to languish as Japan's economic recovery sped up. He retired from politics in 1967. Thereafter, he collected socialist literature and other materials, establishing a "Socialist Library" which he later donated to the Museum of Modern Japanese Literature.

In later years he moved further left, opposed Saburō Eda’s structural-reform theory, visited China in 1962, and helped draft the party’s “Road to Socialism in Japan”. He retired from electoral politics before the 1967 general election. He collected socialist literature, establishing the “Shakai Bunko” (Socialist Library), which was later donated to the Museum of Modern Japanese Literature.

Suzuki died of liver cirrhosis in Tokyo on 7 May 1970 at the age of 77. His last words are recorded as “Ōuchi-sensei, I leave it to you” (addressed to economist Ōuchi Hyōei).

== Sources cited ==
- Kapur, Nick (2018). Japan at the Crossroads: Conflict and Compromise after Anpo. Cambridge, MA: Harvard University Press. ISBN 978-0674984424.
- Kotobank. "Suzuki Mosaburō". Kotobank (in Japanese).

== Works cited ==
- Cole, Allan; Totten, George; Uyehara, Cecil (1966). Socialist Parties In Postwar Japan. Yale University Press.
- Scalapino, Robert (1967). The Japanese Communist Movement, 1920-1966. University of California Press.
