= Hyōgikai =

Japanese trade union federation (1925–1928)

Nihon Rōdō Kumiai Hyōgikai
- Council of Japanese Labor Unions
- 日本労働組合評議会
- Formation: 25 May 1925
- Dissolved: 10 April 1928
- Type: Trade union federation
- Members: c. 35,000 (1925)
- Chairman: Noda Ritsuta
- Publication: Rōdō Shimbun
- Affiliations: Japanese Communist Party; Rōdō Nōmintō (from 1926)

The Council of Japanese Labor Unions (日本労働組合評議会, Nihon Rōdō Kumiai Hyōgikai; commonly known as the Hyōgikai) was a militant, communist-aligned trade union federation in Japan that existed from 1925 to 1928. Formed in the aftermath of a major split in the Sōdōmei (Japanese Federation of Labor), the Hyōgikai represented the radical wing of the Japanese labor movement in the mid-1920s. Characterized by its advocacy of class struggle, its close ties to the Japanese Communist Party (JCP), and its intense rivalry with the more moderate Sōdōmei, the Hyōgikai played a significant, though short-lived, role in the politics of interwar Japan. It grew to a membership of approximately 35,000 before it was ultimately dissolved by the government in a nationwide crackdown on communist activity in 1928.

== Background ==
The Hyōgikai's origins lie in the ideological conflicts that fractured the Japanese labor movement in the early 1920s. Following a period of cooperation between various leftist factions, including anarcho-syndicalists and communists, tensions mounted within the mainstream Sōdōmei (Japanese Federation of Labor). The Sōdōmei leadership, under figures like Suzuki Bunji, espoused a reformist socialist platform, but faced increasing pressure from both government crackdowns and internal radicalism. The Sōdōmei convention of October 1922 signaled the end of anarchist power within the Japanese labor movement.

In the wake of the 1923 Great Kantō earthquake, the government intensified its suppression of radical movements, culminating in the arrests of numerous communists and the temporary dissolution of the Japanese Communist Party (JCP) in 1924. Fearing that its links with communists would invite government repression, the Sōdōmei leadership moved to publicly dissociate itself from the communist movement. This led to direct confrontation with communist and pro-communist unionists. After communists failed in a bid to gain control of Sōdōmei's Kantō federation in October 1924, the right-wing leaders forced Watanabe Masanosuke, Sugiura Keiichi, and their affiliated unions out of the federation. In December, these expelled unions formed the Kantō District Council of Sōdōmei (Nihon Rōdō Sōdōmei Kantō Chihō Hyōgikai (日本労働総同盟関東地方評議会)).

A formal schism was precipitated by the JCP's attempt to regain influence. In May 1925, the Profintern, in the presence of a Japanese representative, passed a resolution urging the left wing not to leave the Sōdōmei but to fight the "right-wing deviationists" from within. However, the message arrived too late. On 16 May 1925, the Sōdōmei central committee, under pressure from its anti-communist factions, formally expelled its 25 "reform" unions. On 25 May, these expelled unions—joined by another seven to total 32 organizations with approximately 11,000 members—formally established the Nihon Rōdō Kumiai Hyōgikai in Kobe. The event, which divided the labor movement into two hostile camps, became known as the dai-ichiji bunretsu (first great split).

== Ideology and structure ==
The Hyōgikai positioned itself as the only "truly 'progressive' labor organization in Japan," built on a platform of militant class consciousness and struggle against capitalism. It was, in effect, a communist front organization, closely linked to the JCP and, through it, the Comintern. From its inception, it served as the chief vehicle for the Japanese Communist movement until its dissolution. Its founding committee attacked Sōdōmei for "betraying the working class by drifting away from the spirit of the labor movement and... conciliating the capitalists." It declared that through organization and struggle it would "oppose capitalist exploitation and win the complete emancipation of the working class." The Hyōgikai's central committee insisted that the struggle of the workers had to be transformed into a political class struggle, using economic issues to recruit the masses and train them politically in the struggle for power.

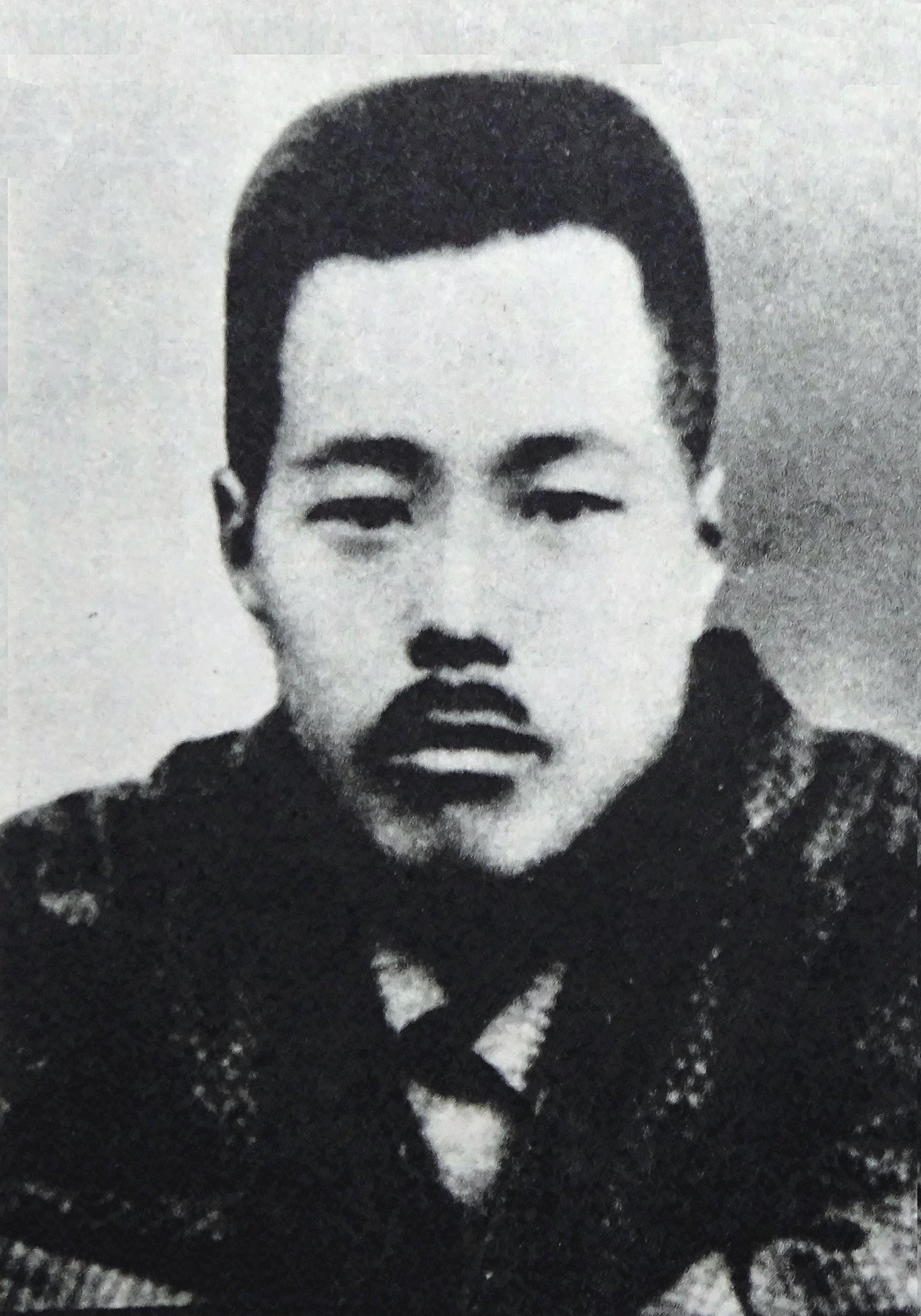
Watanabe Masanosuke

The federation's leadership consisted almost entirely of JCP members. Its first chairman was the non-communist Noda Ritsuta, though he later joined the party. Key posts were held by Nabeyama Sadachika, Mitamura Shirō, and Taniguchi Zentarō. Watanabe Masanosuke, as head of the JCP's labor bureau, was a powerful influence who designed the Hyōgikai's administrative structure and platform.

Structurally, the Hyōgikai mirrored the Sōdōmei with a national headquarters and regional district councils. It claimed to operate on the principle of democratic centralism, where workers could freely debate policy within their unions' "study and action 'cells'," but were expected to conform to decisions once they were made. This structure was intended to avoid the "tyranny of bureaucracy" the Hyōgikai accused the Sōdōmei of, and to empower the "working masses" rather than a privileged "labor aristocracy" (rōdō kizoku (労働貴族)). Its initial strength of around 11,000 members grew to approximately 35,000 in 59 unions by the end of 1925, roughly the same size as Sōdōmei.

== Activities ==
=== Labor disputes ===
The Hyōgikai's primary tactic was the use of militant labor strikes. Its leaders believed that the political education of the workers would occur most effectively in the course of industrial action, where revolutionary theory could be linked to practice. In 1926 alone, over 5,000 Hyōgikai members were detained by the police and 196 were imprisoned because of strikes. Notable disputes included a 58-day strike at the Kyodo Printing Company and a 105-day strike at the Japan Musical Instrument Company in Hamamatsu in 1926. During the latter, leaders Mitamura and Nabeyama utilized tactics learned from the 30 May Movement in Shanghai to establish a strike headquarters with departments for information, education, and defense, and formed a militant force of 13 squads of strikers. This approach, which often pursued strikes without regard for the union's survival, contrasted sharply with the Sōdōmei's more restrained view of strikes as a last resort.

Hyōgikai's leaders were also active on the international front. In 1925, they sent Mitamura and Yamamoto to Shanghai to confer with leaders of the Chinese General Council of Trade Unions, observing and later applying Chinese strike tactics in Japan.

=== Political activities ===
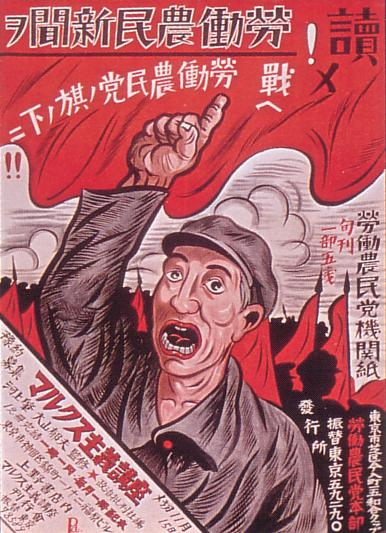
1928 electoral poster of the Rōdō Nōmintō (Labor-Farmer Party)

The split in the labor movement was paralleled by a split in the movement to establish a proletarian political party. Following the passage of the Universal Manhood Suffrage Act in 1925, the Hyōgikai became deeply involved in the nascent proletarian party movement. After the immediate dissolution of the Farmer-Labor Party (Nōmin Rōdōtō (農民労働党)) in December 1925, the Hyōgikai threw its support behind the new Rōdō Nōmintō (Labor-Farmer Party), formed in March 1926. This party represented the "legal left" of the socialist movement, containing both Communist and non-Communist elements but essentially under Communist control. The Hyōgikai ran some of its key personnel, such as Yamamoto Kenzō and Sugiura Keiichi, under the Labor-Farmer Party banner in the 1928 general election. The Sōdōmei and other moderates backed different parties, such as the Social Democratic Party, leading to a hopelessly divided proletarian political movement.

The rivalry between the Hyōgikai and Sōdōmei was intense. The two federations engaged in a fierce propaganda war, each trying to discredit the other. The Hyōgikai's official organ, the Rōdō Shimbun (Labor Newspaper), and Sōdōmei's Rōdō (Labor) traded blistering critiques. The Sōdōmei portrayed the Hyōgikai as a foreign-manipulated entity with no place in Japan, while the Hyōgikai attacked the Sōdōmei for its reformism and alleged collaboration with "Sōdōmei imperialism."

== Decline and dissolution ==
Despite its initial militancy and rapid growth, the Hyōgikai was weakened by both internal and external pressures. The failure of many of its costly strikes led to high rates of organizational attrition. The unions also struggled to penetrate large enterprises, where industrial paternalism and the nenkō (seniority wage) system tied workers more closely to their companies, leaving the Hyōgikai largely confined to less stable small and medium-sized firms.

By 1927, facing an erosion of support, the Hyōgikai reassessed its tactics. At its annual convention, it announced it would pursue a path of "realism" (genjitsushugi (現実主義)), stressing the evolutionary development of unions, collective bargaining, and the securing of legal rights for workers—a platform that moved closer to the Sōdōmei's long-standing objectives. This shift was seen by some as a rejection of the ultraleftist Fukumotoism that had previously influenced its ideology.

This moderation, however, was not enough to save the organization. The government's nationwide crackdown on communists in the March 15 incident of 1928 decimated the Hyōgikai's ranks. On 10 April 1928, the Home Minister ordered the dissolution of the Hyōgikai, along with the Rōdō Nōmintō and the Proletarian Youth League, branding them as Communist-front organizations. At the time of its dissolution, Hyōgikai represented 82 unions with some 23,000 members. Although officially dismantled, some of its elements regrouped in December 1928 to form an underground successor organization, the Nihon Rōdō Kumiai Zenkoku Kyōgikai (National Council of Japanese Labor Unions), or Zenkyō.
