= Ritsuta Noda =

Japanese trade unionist and politician

1928 election poster for Noda Ritsuta, consisting of his name printed in red letters on a sheet of newspaper.

Ritsuta Noda (野田 律太, Noda Ritsuta; 1891-1948) was a Japanese trade unionist and politician. Noda served as the chairman of the pro-communist national trade union centre Hyōgikai.

== Early life ==
Noda was born in a small village in Okayama Prefecture in 1891. He completed his primary school studies and began working at the age of twelve. In 1904 he moved to Osaka, where he began an apprenticeship at an electric company. He went on to serve as a fireman and joined the army, but was released from military service for health reasons.

After being released from the army, Noda began working at a foundry. He also volunteered as part of a military transportation crew during the 1914 Siege of Tsingtao.

== Trade unionist ==
Noda was active in trade unions in Osaka along with his wife Kimiko. He had joined the trade union movement in 1916. Between 1919 and 1922 he mobilized various strikes amongst the shipyard and iron workers of the city. In 1923 he founded the Osaka Machine Workers Union (affiliated to the Sodomei trade union centre).

Noda and his wife were also founders of the clandestine Osaka Birth Control Study Society in 1923.

When the pro-communist Hyōgikai trade union centre was founded in May 1925, Noda was elected as its chairman. Noda was not a Communist Party member at the time though, although he later became a communist.

Noda stood as the Labour-Farmer Party candidate from the first district of Osaka Prefecture in the 1928 national Diet election (one of eleven Communist Party members running as Labour-Farmer Party candidates across the country). He was not elected. He was arrested in connection with the March 15 incident, and sentenced to two years imprisonment and five years suspended prison sentence.
