= National Democratic Party (Japan, 1929) =

National Democratic Party 全国民衆党
- Chairperson: Miyazaki Ryusuke
- Founded: 1929
- Dissolved: 1930
- Split from: Social Democratic Party
- Merged into: National Masses Party
- Ideology: Agrarian socialism Japanese nationalism
- Political position: Left-wing

The National Democratic Party was a political party in Japan, led by Miyazaki Ryusuke. Miyazaki broke away from the Social Democratic Party in 1929, after having drifted towards conservative positions. The party contested the 1930 elections, with Miyzaki unsuccessfully running in the Fourth district. After the 1930 election the party merged with the Japan Masses Party, the Tokyo Proletarian Party and ten local parties, forming the National Masses Party.
