= Kokumin Doshikai =

Kokumin Doshikai 国民同志会
- Leader: Muto Sanji
- Founded: 23 April 1924
- Dissolved: 24 January 1932

The Kokumin Doshikai (Japanese: 国民同志会) was a political party in Japan.

== History ==
The party was established on 23 April 1924 by eight members of the National Diet, and was initially named Jitsugyo Doshikai (実業同志会, Business Fellow Thinkers Club). Headed by Muto Sanji, its members were businessmen who supported free market policies.

In the 1928 elections, the first held under universal male suffrage, the party was reduced to four seats, with most of its support coming from urban areas. In April 1929 it was renamed Kokumin Doshikai, and went on to win six seats in the 1930 elections, but was dissolved on 24 January 1932.

== Election results ==
Election	Votes	%	Seats	+/–
1928	166,250	1.69	4 / 466	Steady
1930	128,505	1.23%	6 / 466	▲2
