= Japan Labour-Farmer Party =

Japan Labour-Farmer Party 日本労農党 Nihon Rōnōtō
- A Japan Labour-Farmer Party template poster used to announce public meetings of the party. The symbol of the party appears on the shield, with a hammer and pick-axe, a red star, a globe and the letters NRNT, the Latin script abbreviation of the name of the party.
- Abbreviation: NRNT
- Chairperson: Asō Hisashi
- Secretary-General: Miwa Jusō
- Founded: 9 December 1926; 99 years ago
- Dissolved: December 1928
- Split from: Social Democratic Party
- Merged into: Japan Masses Party
- Labour wing: Japan Labour Union League
- Women's wing: National Women's League
- Peasants' wing: All-Japan Peasant Union
- Membership (1927): 6,000
- Ideology: Socialism
- Political position: Left-wing

The Japan Labour-Farmer Party (日本労農党, Nihon Rōnōtō) was a socialist political party in Japan between December 1926 and December 1928. During its existence, it occupied a centrist position in the divided socialist movement.

== Foundation ==
The Japan Labour-Farmer Party was one of several proletarian parties that existed in Japan in the late 1920s. It was founded in Tokyo on December 9, 1926, as a split from the Social Democratic Party (the founding occurred just four days after the founding of the Social Democratic Party). The split had both personal and ideological dimensions. Amongst the founders of the Japan Labour-Farmer Party were Asanuma Inejirō and his followers in the Japan Peasant Union and leftwing socialist intellectuals such as Asō Hisashi, Kono Mitsu, Suzuki Mosaburō, Tanahashi Kotora and Kato Kanju. Asō Hisashi became chairman of the party, whilst Miwa Jusō became its general secretary.

== Political outlook ==
In terms of its programme, the party differed little from the Labour-Farmer Party which was essentially controlled by the Japanese Communist Party, although having non-Communists amongst the ranks. In fact several members of the Japan Labour-Farmer Party were former communists themselves (such as Kondo Eizo, the founder of the Enlightened People's Communist Party). However, in practice there was a clear political demarcation between the Japan Labour-Farmer Party and the Labour-Farmer Party. The Japan Labour-Farmer Party occupied a centrist position in the Japanese left at the time, between the Japanese Communist Party and the Labour-Farmer Party on the left and the Social Democratic Party on its right. The party sought to mobilize the working class masses in legal struggles. The party opposed Japanese intervention in China.

== Polemics with other socialist parties ==
Whilst the leadership of the Japan Labour-Farmer Party rejected links to the Communist International, they did identify themselves as revolutionary Marxists. The party stated that it had adopted the "correct line in the proletarian movement". In their discourse, the leftwing of the socialist movement suffered from an "infantile disorder" whilst the rightwing was "senile". However, the party was also criticized from its two flanks, the left characterizing it as "petty bourgeois" and the right claiming that the party was used by the communists. There were also some other, regional, proletarian parties, which also found themselves having centrist positions like the Japan Labour-Farmer Party.

In its 1927 thesis the Communist Party stated that the role of the Japan Labour-Farmer Party was particularly "treacherous", and that the Japan Labour-Farmer Party differentiated itself from the right-wing Social Democrats merely by utilizing a fake leftist discourse. In 1928, however, the Communist Party adopted a position to work for the unification of the Japan Labour-Farmer Party and the Labour-Farmer Party. The Communist Party directed cadres to work within the Japan Labour-Farmer Party. In practice, however, they could not establish any foothold inside the party like they had in the Labour-Farmer Party.

== Mass organizations ==
The 1926 split in the Social Democratic Party was followed by a split in the Sodomei trade union centre. The leaders of the Japan Labour-Farmer Party were asked to resign from their leadership positions in Sodomei, as they refused they were expelled from the organization. The Japan Labour-Farmer Party regrouped their followers in the labour movement and formed a new trade union centre of their own, the Japan Labour Union League. In February 1927, farmers sympathizing with the party broke away from the Social Democratic Party-led General Federation of Japanese Peasant Unions, and formed the All-Japan Peasant Union as the agrarian wing of the Japan Labour-Farmer Party. In October 1927, a women's organization connection to the party was formed, the National Women's League.

== 1927 and 1928 elections ==
According to a 1927 Communist Party document, the party was estimated to have around 6,000 members. The party won three seats in the prefectural elections in October 1927. In total it had presented 32 candidates, whom together got 34,718 votes.

Ahead of the 1928 national Diet elections the Japan Labour-Farmer Party proposed various far-reaching reforms, such as scrapping military education for students and introducing government regulations on food prices. The election was characterized by fierce confrontations not only between the governing side and the opposition, but also between the different proletarian parties. Moreover, the proletarian parties lacked well-known candidates and the financial resources of the established politicians. Bribery and coercion was common in several constituencies. In Ashio, where the Japan Labour-Farmer Party leader Asō Hisashi stood as a candidate, police used to break up electoral meetings of the party and the local mining company contributed financially to the campaigns of Asō Hisashi's opponents.

The party supported 14 candidates in the elections, whom together mustered 93,400 votes (0.9% of the nationwide vote). One of its candidates got elected. (Banno, however, states that the party had 13 candidates, with a combined vote of 86,698 votes, out of whom one was elected.) The sole winner of a parliamentary seat of the Japan Labour-Farmer Party was Kawakami Jōtarō, a lawyer from Kobe. The overwhelming majority of the votes for the party in these elections had come from urban areas (where most of its candidates had been launched).

Following the election the three proletarian parties in the assembly (the Japan Labour-Farmer Party, Labour-Farmer Party and the Social Democratic Party) managed to form a joint parliamentary committee, in spite of their political contradictions. The committee did however not last, as the government banned the Labour-Farmer Party. The Japan Labour-Farmer Party wanted the joint committee to protest against the ban, whilst the Social Democratic Party did not want neither to protest against the ban nor retain any contacts with the Labour-Farmer Party after the ban had been issued.

== Merger into the Japan Masses Party ==
In December 1928, the party merged with the Proletarian Masses Party, the Japan Farmers Party and four regional political parties, forming the Japan Masses Party. However, even after the merger the leadership clique of the Japan Labour-Farmer Party maintained itself as a separate grouping throughout the 1930s.
