= Japan Farmers Party (1926–1928) =

Japan Farmers Party 日本農民党 Nihon Nōmintō
- Founded: 17 October 1926; 99 years ago
- Dissolved: December 1928
- Split from: Labour-Farmer Party
- Merged into: Japan Masses Party
- Ideology: Farmers interests Socialism; Agrarianism; Japanese nationalism
- Political position: Left-wing

The Japan Farmers Party (Japanese: 日本農民党, Nihon Nōmintō) was a political party in Japan between 1926 and 1928. It represented a rightist tendency amongst the proletarian parties in the country at the time. The party had a nationalist orientation.

== Split from the Labour-Farmer Party ==
The party emerged from a split in the Labour-Farmer Party in 1926. An older generation of leaders of the Japan Peasant Union, such as Okabe Kansuke and Hirano Rikizō, were uncomfortable with the influence of the younger, radical generation in the Japan Peasant Union (who were keen on including leftwing elements in the Labour-Farmer Party), such as Oyama Ikuo. Okabe and Hirano's group broke away from the Labour-Farmer Party in March 1926 and on October 17, 1926, they founded the Japan Farmers Party. The Japan Farmers Party declared itself to be "a party by farmers, for farmers". In this sense the party differentiated itself from the other proletarian parties, which all declared themselves to be based on a worker-peasant class alliance.

== 1927 ==
The party won four seats in the 1927 prefectural assembly elections of 1927.

== 1928 election ==
As of 1928, the Japan Farmers Party claimed a membership of 70,138. The figure does however appear to be unreliable, compared to the national vote for the party in the elections the same year. The party launched ten candidates in the 1928 Diet election, whom together mustered 36,491 votes. None of the candidates of the party were elected.

== Merger into the Japan Masses Party ==
In December 1928 the party merged with the Proletarian Masses Party, the Japan Labour-Farmer Party and four regional political parties, forming the Japan Masses Party.
