= Noda =

Noda may refer to:

== Places ==
- Noda, Azerbaijan, a village in Azerbaijan
- Noda, Chiba, a city in Chiba Prefecture, Japan
- Noda, Iwate, a village in Iwate Prefecture, Japan
- Noda, Kagoshima, a former town in Kagoshima Prefecture, Japan
- NoDa (neighborhood), Charlotte, North Carolina, United States
- Nöda, a municipality in Thuringia, Germany
- Name of Chekhov, Sakhalin Oblast until 1947

== Other uses ==
- Noda (surname), a Japanese surname
- National Operatic and Dramatic Association
