= Young Communist League of Japan =

The Young Communist League of Japan (日本共産青年同盟, Nihon Kyōsan Seinen Dōmei) was a youth organization in Japan and the youth wing of the Japanese Communist Party. The Young Communist League was founded in the summer of 1925, by communist activists from the Hyōgikai youth division and the All-Japan Student Social Science Federation (or Gakuren). The Young Communist League was led by Kitaura.

In August 1925 the Young Communist League merged into the Levelers Youth League, which later the same year took part in founding a broader youth movement, the All-Japan Proletarian Youth League.
