= Noda (surname) =

Noda (written: 野田) is a Japanese surname. Notable people with the surname include:

- Akemi Noda (野田 朱美, born 1969), Japanese football player
- Akihiro Noda (野田 明弘, born 1988), Japanese footballer
- Alice Sae Teshima Noda (1894–1964), American businesswoman
- Asajiro Noda (野田 朝次郎, 1868–1942), New Zealand sailor and farmer
- Chihiro Noda (野田 智裕, born 1988), Japanese footballer
- Eva Saito-Noda (1921–2004), Canadian composer
- Hideki Noda (野田 英樹, born 1969), Japanese racing driver
- Hideki Noda (playwright) (野田 秀樹, born 1955), Japanese actor, playwright and theatre director
- Hideo Noda (野田 英夫, 1908-1939), American artist
- Hiroki Noda (野田 裕喜, born 1997), Japanese footballer
- Isao Noda (born 1951), Japanese chemical engineer
- Junko Noda (野田 順子, born 1971), Japanese voice actress
- Kazuo Noda (野田 一雄, 1908–?), Japanese swimmer
- Keiichi Noda (野田 圭一, born 1943), Japanese voice actor
- Ken Noda, American classical pianist
- Kiyoshi Noda (野田 清, born 1946), Japanese handball player
- Kogo Noda (野田 高梧, 1893–1968), Japanese screenwriter
- Koji Noda (野田 紘史, born 1986), Japanese footballer
- Kōsuke Noda (野田 浩輔, born 1977), Japanese baseball player
- Kyohei Noda (野田 恭平, born 1981), Japanese footballer
- Mitsuzo Noda (1909–1995), phycologist
- Nagi Noda (野田 凪, 1973–2008), Japanese artist
- Nobuo Noda (野田 信夫, 1893–1993), Japanese business scholar
- Ritsuta Noda (野田 律太, 1891–1948), Japanese trade unionist and politician
- Ryan Noda (born 1996), American baseball player
- Ryō Noda (野田 燎), Japanese composer and musician
- Ryunosuke Noda (野田 隆之介, born 1988), Japanese footballer
- Satoru Noda (artist) (野田 サトル), Japanese manga artist
- Satoru Noda (footballer) (野田 知, born 1969), Japanese footballer
- Seiko Noda (野田 聖子, born 1960), Japanese politician
- Steere Noda (1892–1986), American politician, lawyer and baseball player
- Takeshi Noda (野田 毅, born 1941), Japanese politician
- Teppei Noda (野田 鉄平, born 1977), Japanese freestyle skier
- Tetsuya Noda (野田 哲也, born 1940), Japanese artist, printmaker and educator
- Tomohiro Noda (野田 明宏, born 1996), Japanese racewalker
- Noda Utarō (野田 卯太郎, 1853–1927), Japanese businessman and politician
- Yojiro Noda (野田 洋次郎, born 1985), Japanese singer, songwriter, record producer and actor
- Yoshihiko Noda (野田 佳彦, born 1957), Japanese politician and prime minister
- Yoshiro Noda (野田 芳郎, born 1936), Japanese swimmer
