= Labour-Farmer Masses Party =

Political party in Japan

The Labour-Farmer Masses Party (労農大衆党, Rōnō-taishū-tō) was a political party in Japan. It was founded in January 1929 by Mizutani Chozaburo, a former associate of the Labour-Farmer Party leader Oyama Ikuo. Mizutani criticized Oyama Ikuo for being too open towards a merger with the centrist sectors of the socialist movement. The Labour-Farmer Masses Party was largely confined to Kyoto. The party was one of the founders of the United Proletarian Party Front in 1929.

After the 1930 election the party changed its mind regarding unification with the other socialist groups and the party. The party merged with the Tokyo Proletarian Party, forming the National Conference for a United Proletarian Party which in turn merged with other parties on July 20, 1930, founding the National Masses Party.
