= Yamamoto Senji =

- 山本 宣治
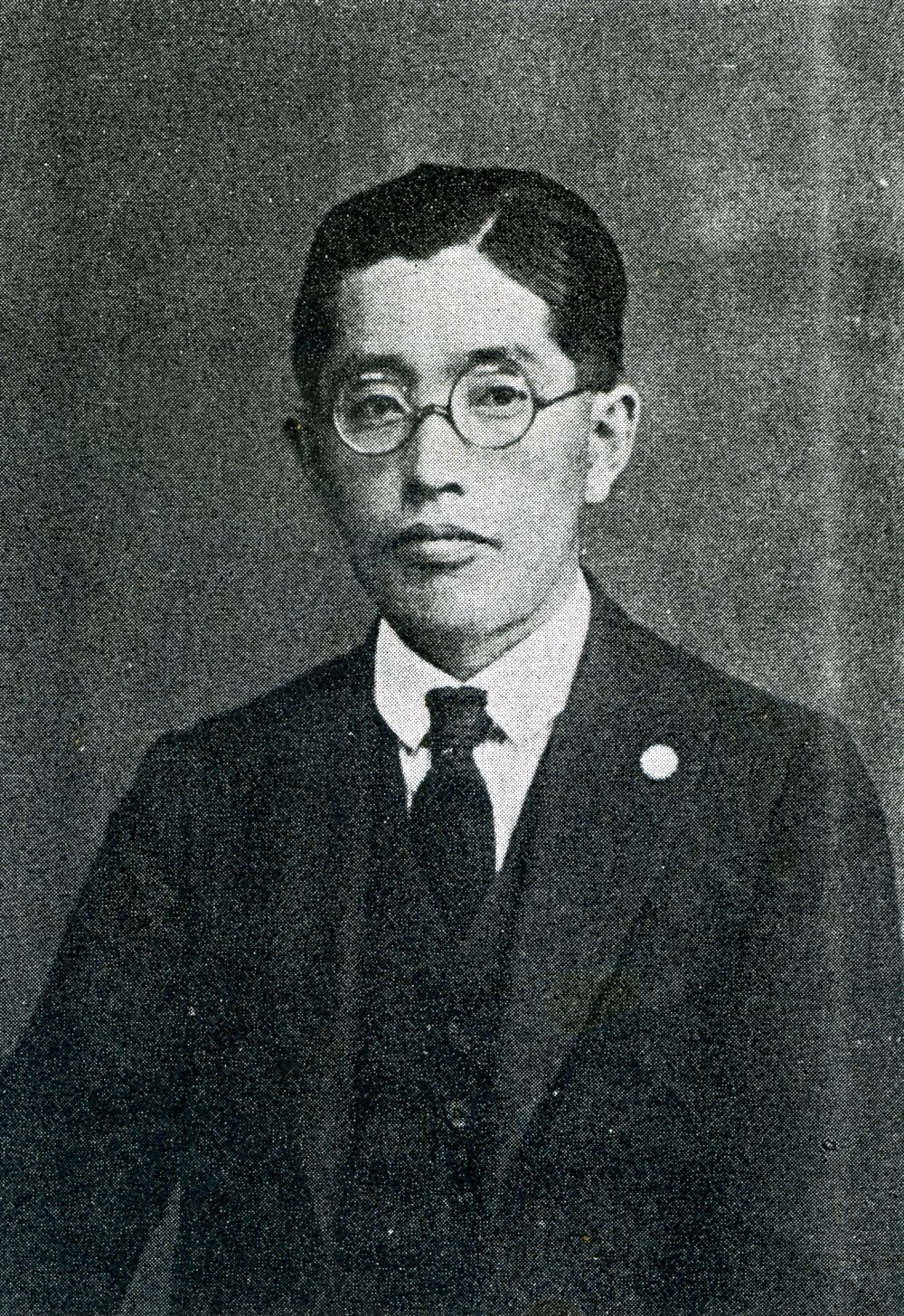

Member of the House of Representatives
- In office 21 February 1928 – 5 March 1929
- Preceded by: Constituency established
- Succeeded by: Sukeshirō Tanaka
- Constituency: Kyoto 2nd

Personal details
- Born: 28 May 1889 Kyoto, Japan
- Died: 5 March 1929 (aged 39) Tokyo, Japan
- Party: Communist
- Other political affiliations: LFP (1927–1928)
- Education: University of Tokyo

Yamamoto Senji (山本宣治; 28 May 1889 – 5 March 1929) was a Japanese biologist and leftist politician during the interwar period of Showa era Japan.

== Political career ==
Yamamoto was elected to the House of Representatives in the 1928 General Election in February, being one of the two members of the Labour-Farmer Party who got elected, alongside Mizutani Chozaburo. The party was subsequently banned less than a month after the election, but both representatives retained their parliamentary functions. During his term he criticized the torture and illegal detention of prisoners by the police and unsuccessfully spoke against amending the Peace Preservation Law of 1925 to include the death penalty. Despite this, the amendment was passed in the Diet by a vote of 249-170. On that night, he was killed by a right-wing assassin at an inn in the Kanda district of Tokyo.
