= Kanjū Katō =

Japanese politician and labour activist (1892–1978)

- 加藤 勘十
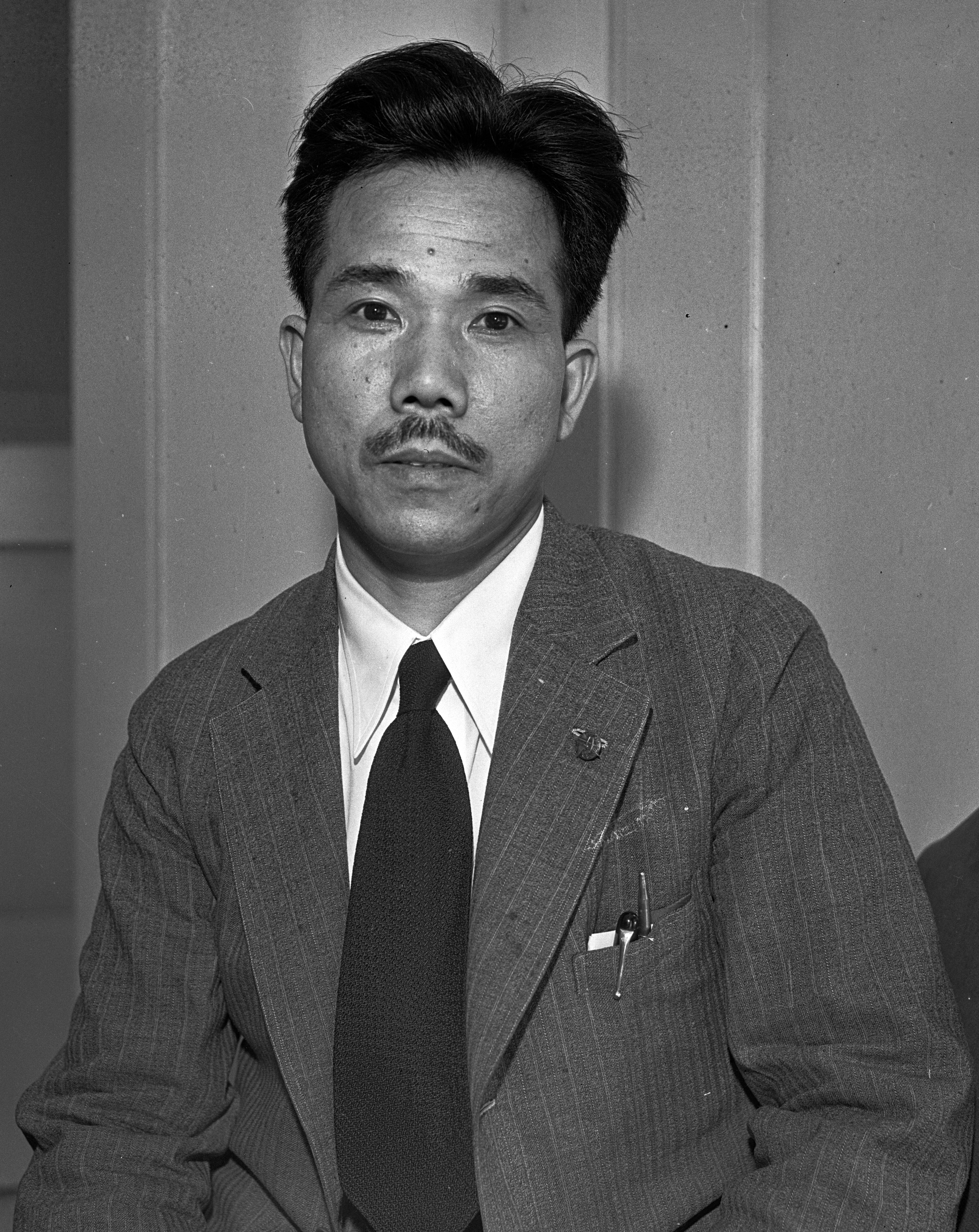
- Katō in 1935

Minister of Labor
- In office 1948–1948
- Prime Minister: Hitoshi Ashida
- Preceded by: Mitsusuke Yonekubo
- Succeeded by: Shigeru Yoshida (acting)

Member of the House of Representatives

Personal details
- Born: 25 February 1892 Iwakura Village, Niwa District, Aichi Prefecture, Japan
- Died: 27 September 1978 (aged 86)
- Party: Japan Socialist Party
- Other political affiliations: Rightist Socialist Party of Japan (after 1951 split)
- Spouse: Shidzue Katō (m. 1944; died 1978)
- Children: Nobuyuki Katō; Taki Katō
- Education: Nihon University Faculty of Law (did not graduate)
- Awards: Order of the Sacred Treasure, 1st Class (1970); Junior Third Rank (posthumous, 1978)

Kanjū Katō (加藤 勘十 (Katō Kanjū), 25 February 1892 – 27 September 1978), also known as Kanju Kato, was a Japanese politician and labour activist of the Shōwa period. He served seven terms as a member of the House of Representatives for the Japan Socialist Party and was the second Minister of Labor. He was also known by the pen names Hekisui and Sotsu.

A militant labour organizer active in the prewar period, he was nicknamed "Fireball Kanjū" (火の玉勘十, Hi no tama Kanjū). His elder brother was Chōichi Katō, a member of the House of Representatives for the Constitutional Democratic Party (Rikken Minseitō) and the National Alliance (Kokumin Dōmei). His wife was the women’s rights activist and politician Shidzue Katō; the couple were known as the "mandarin duck Diet members" (おしどり議員, oshidori giin). Their son was Nobuyuki Katō and their daughter was Taki Katō.

== Biography ==
Katō was born on 25 February 1892 in Iwakura Village, Niwa District, Aichi Prefecture (present-day Iwakura, Aichi).

He attended Nihon Middle School (now Nihon Gakuen Junior and Senior High School) and later enrolled in the Faculty of Law at Nihon University but did not complete his studies.

He initially held nationalist views and participated in the Siberian Intervention in 1918. The experience of the horrors of war led him to turn toward anti-war and labour activism.

Returning to Japan in 1920, he helped lead the dispute at the government-operated Yawata Steel Works.

In 1928 he was elected chairman of the Kantō Metal Industry Workers’ Union.

In 1929 he joined the Labour-Farmer Party (Rōnōtō).

In 1934 he became chairman of the Japan Trade Union National Council (日本労働組合全国評議会, Nihon Rōdō Kumiai Zenkoku Hyōgikai; commonly known as Zenpyō), also referred to in contemporary English sources as the National Council of Japanese Trade Unions.

In June 1935, while serving as chairman of the National Council of Japanese Trade Unions, Katō visited the United States (arriving in Manhattan). He was described contemporaneously as “doughty” and “ever fearless of the ‘patriotic’ assassins who have often tried to get him.” He was nearly barred from entry to the United States on the assumption that he was a Communist. In interviews he stated that Japanese workers had not benefited from the occupation of Manchukuo except for those in munitions factories; for others, “conditions have been very bad” because “the gulf between prices and wages in Japan has been considerably increased.” He noted growing peasant disapproval of Japan’s China policy following the agrarian crisis of 1931–32 and famine in northeastern Japan, with an increase in farmer uprisings. Declaring “I am not a Communist… I am a militant unionist,” he explained that “a left winger like myself in Japan is actually much further to the right than a left winger in America” and that he adhered to the left-wing group of workers’ unions “striving to overthrow Capitalism by means of the class struggle.” He cited organized workers numbering 380,000 out of a total working-class population of 5,770,000 and affirmed that “the proletariat of Japan is opposed to the Government’s activities in China.”

In the 1936 general election (19th House of Representatives election) he stood from the old Tokyo 5th district and was elected with the highest national vote total.

In 1937 he became chairman of the Japan Proletarian Party (Nihon Musantō) but was arrested in connection with the Popular Front Incident and imprisoned.

In 1944 he married Shidzue (formerly Baroness Ishimoto), a divorced women’s rights activist. Their activities promoting birth control were suppressed by the government from the wartime period through the defeat.

Left to right: Mitsu Kono, Inejirō Asanuma, Kanjū Katō, (one person omitted), Mosaburō Suzuki

After the war, in 1945 he participated in the founding of the Japan Socialist Party and became its organizational bureau chief.

In the first postwar general election (22nd House of Representatives election, 1946) he was elected from Aichi 1st district; his wife Shidzue was also elected (with the highest national vote total), and the couple became known as the "mandarin duck Diet members". He served as Diet Strategy Committee chairman.

In 1948, under the Ashida Cabinet, he entered the cabinet as Minister of Labor alongside Masaru Nomizo as representatives of the party’s left wing; they were called the "realistic left". As Labor Minister he issued Cabinet Order No. 201 prohibiting the right to strike for public servants, placing him in a difficult position between his previous stance and cabinet responsibilities. The Ashida Cabinet fell over the Shōwa Denkō scandal. In December 1948, both he and his wife were summoned as witnesses before the House of Representatives Special Committee on Improper Property Transactions Investigation in connection with a textile scandal.

In the 1949 general election the Socialist Party suffered a nationwide defeat and Katō lost his seat.

Members of the right wing of the Japan Socialist Party celebrating the results of the 25th House of Representatives general election held on October 1, 1952: Inejirō Asanuma, Jōtarō Kawakami, Kanjū Katō, Mitsu Kōno, and others.

While out of office, in 1951 he ran unsuccessfully for Governor of Tokyo. That October the party split amid left–right conflict; Katō joined the Rightist Socialist Party.

He returned to the Diet in the 1952 general election from Tokyo 2nd district. In Diet questioning he elicited a gaffe from Minister of International Trade and Industry Hayato Ikeda (“It is unavoidable even if small and medium enterprise owners go bankrupt and, driven to despair, commit suicide”), contributing to the passage of a no-confidence motion against Ikeda.

He did not stand in the 1969 general election and retired from politics.

In the 1970 spring honours he received the Order of the Sacred Treasure, 1st Class; together with his wife Shidzue, they were the first Socialist Party members to receive decorations after the postwar resumption of awards to living persons.

He died on 27 September 1978 at the age of 86. On the day of his death he was posthumously awarded Junior Third Rank. His grave is at Zuirin-ji Temple in Taitō, Tokyo.

== Works ==
=== Sole-authored ===
- 寺内内閣と対支外交 [The Terauchi Cabinet and Diplomacy toward China] (in Japanese). Katō Kanjū. April 1918. National Bibliography No. 43025883; NCID BA38844202.
- 階級戦の先頭を往く [Going to the Front of the Class Struggle] (in Japanese). Zenei Shobō. November 1928. National Bibliography No. 46081400; NCID BN04688436.
- ストライキ戦術 [Strike Tactics]. Seibundō 10-sen bunko (in Japanese). Seibundō. December 1930. National Bibliography No. 20098676; NCID BA83198306.
- 統一戦線の展望 反動勢力といかに戦ふか？ [Prospects for a United Front: How to Fight Reactionary Forces?]. Jishin pamphlet, vol. 4 (in Japanese). Jikyoku Shinbunsha. January 1936. National Bibliography No. 44020309; NCID BA39064504.
- 転換期のアメリカ [America in Transition] (in Japanese). Kaizōsha. January 1936. National Bibliography No. 46065205; NCID BA4564273X.
- Tsutomu Kawato, ed. (November 1963). 自叙伝 [Autobiography] (in Japanese). Sōtōkai. National Bibliography No. 64008189; NCID BN14564484.

=== Contributions ===
- "加藤勘十の争議感想記" [Katō Kanjū’s Reflections on the Dispute]. 住友別子鉱山労働運動の顛末 [Account of the Labour Movement at the Sumitomo Besshi Mine] (in Japanese). Sumitomo Besshi Mine Co. Labour Section. October 1929. pp. 640–652. National Bibliography No. 47003019; NCID BA38430072.
- Hōchi Shimbunsha Editorial Bureau, ed. (April 1937). "ファツシヨ排撃・議会政治擁護" [Rejection of Fascism and Defence of Parliamentary Politics]. 国民に訴ふ 各党派代表演説集 [Appeal to the Nation: Collection of Representative Speeches from Various Parties] (in Japanese). Kawade Shobō. pp. 74–85. National Bibliography No. 44007498; NCID BA3957425X.

=== Co-authored ===
- Takao Saitō; Kunimatsu Hamada; Kanjū Katō (January 1937). Hōchi Shimbunsha Editorial Bureau (ed.). 議会主義か・フアツシヨか [Parliamentary Government or Fascism?] (in Japanese). Daihyaku Shobō. National Bibliography No. 20580867; NCID BB16072850.
- Jōtarō Kawakami; Kanjū Katō; Eiichi Nishimura (March 1953). 追従外交と独善政治の正体を曝く [Exposing the True Nature of Subservient Diplomacy and Self-Righteous Politics]. Diet Struggle Series 1 (in Japanese). Japan Socialist Party Publishing Department. NCID BA37971725.

== Related books ==
- Masayoshi Matsui; Sōzō Watanabe; Masaji Naga; Nobuhisa Ōmori; Nobuyuki Katō, ed. (February 1980). 加藤勘十の事ども [Matters Concerning Katō Kanjū] (in Japanese). Shidzue Katō. National Bibliography No. 85044239; NCID BN0099337X.
- Shidzue Katō (July 1988). Kuniko Funabashi (ed.). 最愛のひと勘十へ 加藤シヅエ日記 [To My Beloved Kanjū: The Diary of Shidzue Katō] (in Japanese). Shinyōsha. ISBN 978-4-7885-0308-3. National Bibliography No. 88052649; NCID BN03452988.
