= Farmer-Labour Party =

Defunct political party in Japan

- Chairperson: Sugiyama Motojirō
- Secretary-General: Asanuma Inejiro
- Founded: 1 December 1925; 100 years ago
- Banned: 1 December 1925; 100 years ago
- Succeeded by: Labour-Farmer Party
- Ideology: Socialism
- Political position: Left-wing

The Farmer-Labour Party (農民労働党, Nōmin-rōdō-tō) was a short-lived socialist political party in Japan. The party was the first of the proletarian parties that emerged in the country after the enactment of the Universal Manhood Suffrage Law (普通選挙法, Futsū Senkyo Hō) in 1925, which gave the vote to all males 25 years or older. The party was banned by the Japanese government just a few hours after its foundation.

== Preparations ==
The process to found such a proletarian party had been initiated by the Japan Peasant Union. It sought to gather all parts of the labour movement in the country behind one political party. The preparatory process lasted for several months. In June 1925, the Japan Peasant Union sent out invitations to form the Proletarian Party Preparatory Council. Soon, around 1,000 persons had enlisted in the Preparatory Council. On August 16, 1925, sixteen left-wing groups met, and agreed to form a unified proletarian political party which would include every labour organization with a membership exceeding 100. The Preparatory Council included the rival trade union centres Sodomei and Hyōgikai.

The Platform and Bylaws Research Committee of the Proletarian Party Preparatory Council held its first meeting in September 1925. At the meeting, three draft proposals for party platform were discussed. Two drafts had been authored by rightwing moderates whilst the third (presented by Sano Fumio) represented the communist line. Sano's draft, which emphasized that the party should be built on class struggle and not reformism, was adopted by the Committee. Hyōgikai also submitted their draft for party platform, which listed various political and economical demands. Sodomei protested against both the Sano and the Hyōgikai proposals. On November 29, 1925, Sodomei withdrew from the Preparatory Council, citing that the party-to-be would be in the hands of the far left. The following day Hyōgikai declared their withdrawal from the Preparatory Council.

== Founding ==
The founding conference of the party was held on December 1, 1925, at the YMCA Hall in Tokyo. Thirty-three labour organizations took part in the founding of the party. Sugiyama Motojiro was elected party chairman, and Asanuma Inejirō general secretary. In the party platform the party adopted at its founding meeting demands such as tenants' rights protection, recognition of trade unions, social insurance, and downsizing of the armed forces were included.

== Ban ==
However, just two hours after the founding meeting had concluded the leadership elected at the party conference were summoned at the Metropolitan Police Board. The Police claimed that the newly founded party had a secret communist platform in addition to the official party platform. The Farmer-Labour Party leaders were presented a writ from the Home Minister to immediately disband the party. The party was prohibited under the Section 8, Clause 2 of the Public Peace Police Act, a law that allowed the Home Minister to ban any association seen as threatening public order and safety.
