= 1930 Japanese general election =

- 20 February 1930

All 466 seats in the House of Representatives 234 seats needed for a majority
- Turnout: 82.29% (▲1.96pp)
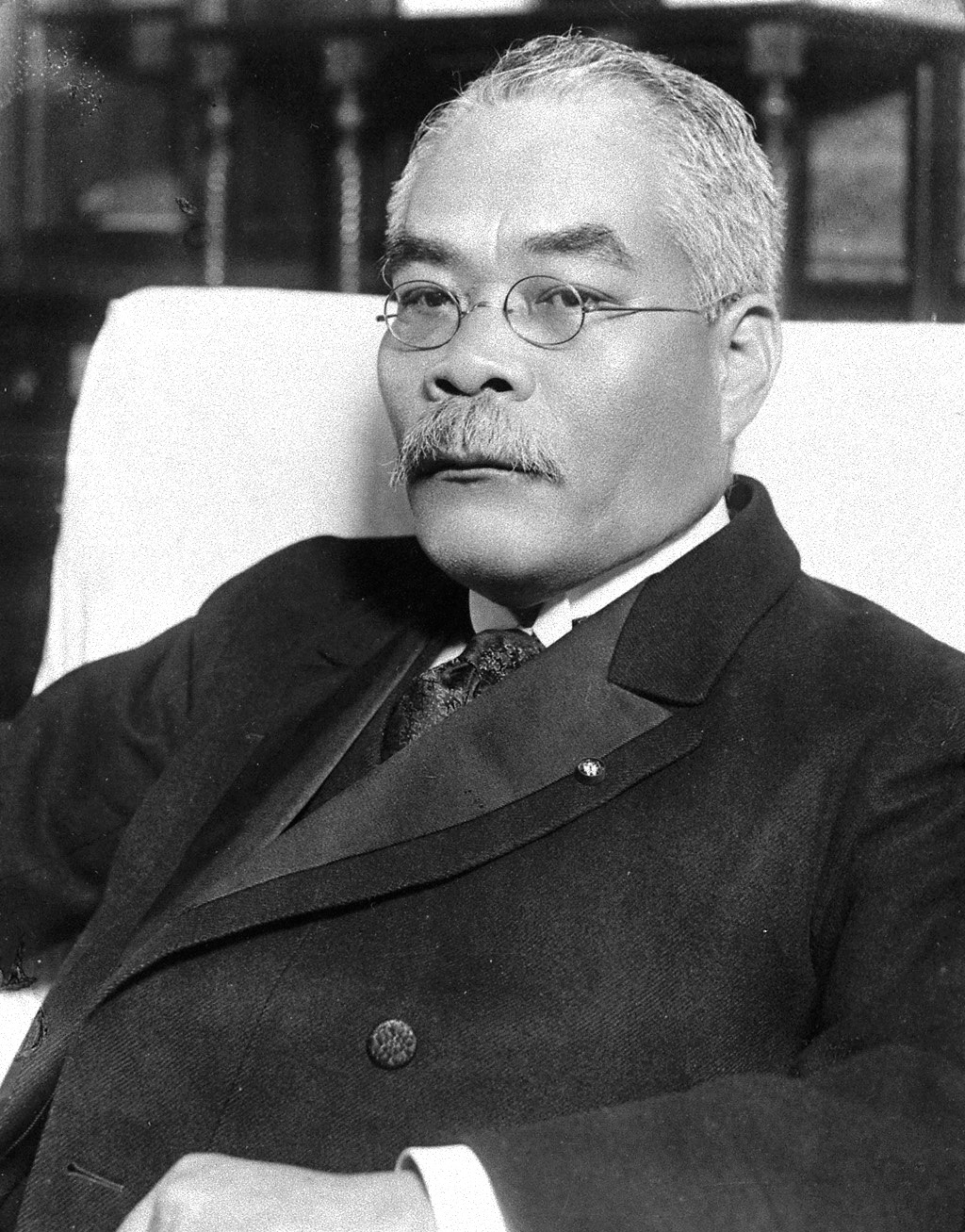

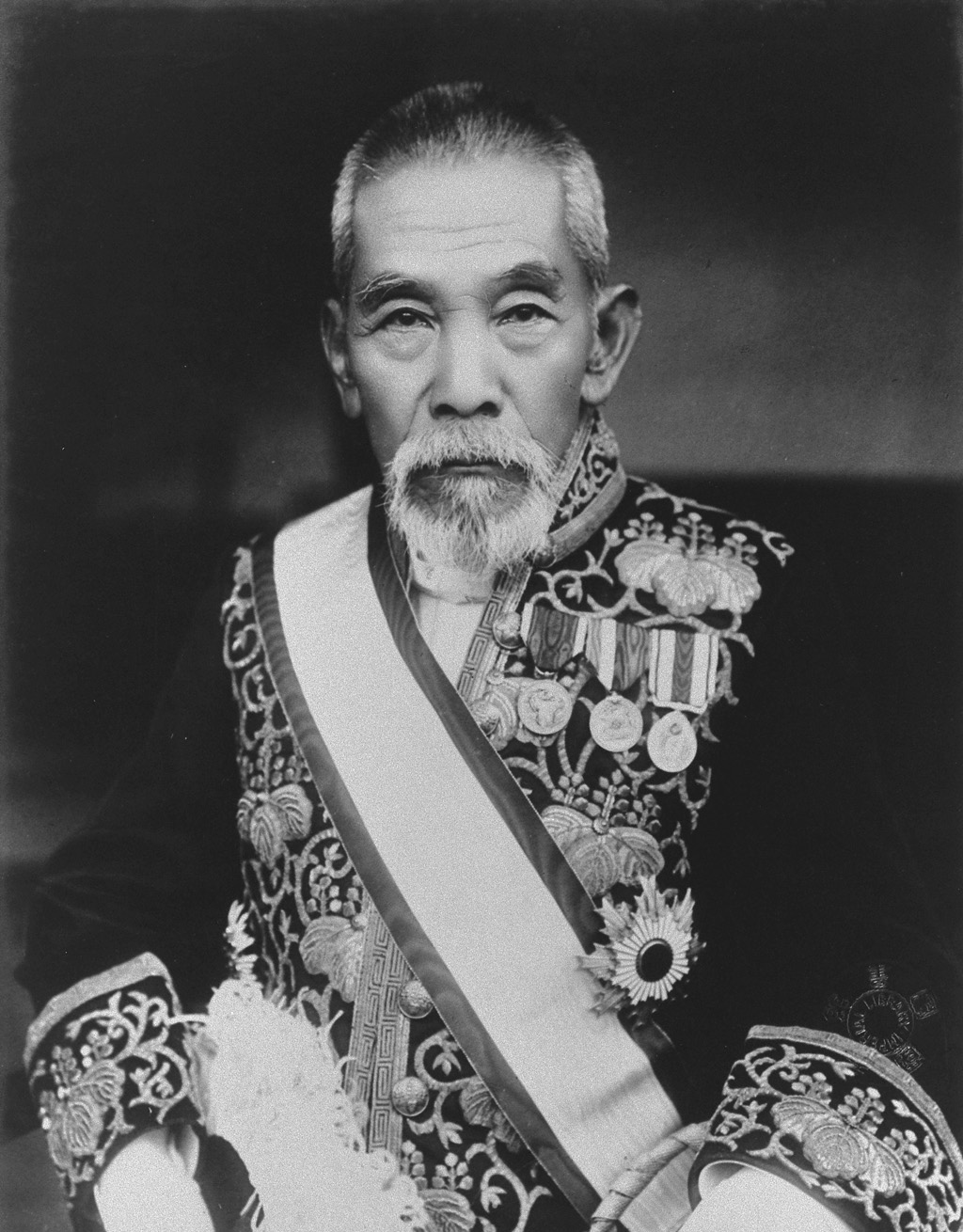
	First party	Second party
Leader	Osachi Hamaguchi	Tsuyoshi Inukai
Party	Rikken Minseitō	Rikken Seiyūkai
Last election	43.06%, 216 seats	43.14%, 217 seats
Seats won	273	174
Seat change	▲57	▼43
Popular vote	5,466,908	3,925,280
Percentage	52.48%	37.69%
Swing	▲9.42pp	▼5.45pp
- Districts shaded according to winners' vote strength
Prime Minister before election
Hamaguchi Osachi
Rikken Minseitō
Elected Prime Minister
Hamaguchi Osachi
Rikken Minseitō

General elections were held in Japan on 20 February 1930. The Constitutional Democratic Party, which was led by Prime Minister Hamaguchi Osachi, won an overall majority in the House of Representatives. Voter turnout was 82%.

== Results ==
Party	Votes	%	Seats	+/–
Constitutional Democratic Party	5,466,908	52.48	273	+57
Rikken Seiyūkai	3,925,980	37.69	174	–43
Social Democratic Party	173,458	1.67	2	–2
Kokumin Doshikai	128,505	1.23	6	+2
Japan Masses Party	158,074	1.52	2	New
Labour-Farmer Masses Party	92,519	0.89	1	New
Local Communists	65,711	0.63	0	–
Kakushintō	55,487	0.53	3	0
Zenkoku Minshuto	13,960	0.13	0	–
Meiseikai	11,315	0.11	0	–
Other parties	1,119	0.01	0	–
Independents	323,536	3.11	5	–10
Total	10,416,572	100.00	466	0
Valid votes	10,416,572	98.79		
Invalid/blank votes	127,617	1.21		
Total votes	10,544,189	100.00		
Registered voters/turnout	12,812,895	82.29		
Source: Voice Japan

=== By prefecture ===
Prefecture	Total seats	Seats won							
Prefecture	Total seats	RM	RS	KD	K	SDP	JMP	L-FMP	Ind.
Aichi	17	11	6						
Akita	7	5	2						
Aomori	6	3	3						
Chiba	11	7	4						
Ehime	9	6	3						
Fukui	5	3	2						
Fukuoka	18	9	8				1		
Fukushima	11	8	3						
Gifu	9	5	4						
Gunma	9	6	3						
Hiroshima	13	8	5						
Hokkaido	20	11	8						1
Hyōgo	19	10	6	1	1				1
Ibaraki	11	8	3						
Ishikawa	6	4	2						
Iwate	7	2	5						
Kagawa	6	3	3						
Kagoshima	12	3	9						
Kanagawa	11	6	4			1			
Kōchi	6	4	2						
Kumamoto	10	6	4						
Kyoto	11	7	3	1					
Mie	9	6	2						1
Miyagi	8	3	5						
Miyazaki	5	4	1						
Nagano	13	9	4						
Nagasaki	9	5	4						
Nara	5	4	1						
Niigata	15	9	5		1				
Ōita	7	5	2						
Okayama	10	4	6						
Okinawa	5	4	1						
Osaka	21	14	4	2		1			
Saga	6	4	2						
Saitama	11	6	5						
Shiga	5	3	1	1					
Shimane	6	5	1						
Shizuoka	13	7	4	1					1
Tochigi	9	5	4						
Tokushima	6	4	2						
Tokyo	31	17	10		1		1	1	1
Tottori	4	3	1						
Toyama	6	4	2						
Wakayama	6	4	2						
Yamagata	8	4	4						
Yamaguchi	9	3	6						
Yamanashi	5	2	3						
Total	466	273	174	6	3	2	2	1	5
