= Japan Labour Union League =

Trade union centre in Japan

Poster of the Japan Labour Union League, February 1927

The Japan Labour Union League (日本労働組合同盟, Nihon rōdō kumiai dōmei; abbreviated "Nichiro") was a trade union centre in Japan. It was founded in December 1926, following the split in the Social Democratic Party as the leaders of the dissident Japan Labour-Farmer Party were expelled from the social-democratic Japan Federation of Labour (Sodomei) trade union centre. The Japan Labour Union League functioned as the trade union wing of the Japan Labour-Farmer Party, and had around 5,000-6,000 members.
