= Enlightened People's Communist Party =

Political party in Japan

The Enlightened People's Communist Party (暁民共産党, Gyōmin Kyōsantō) was a political party in Japan. The party, which called for immediate revolution in Japan, is not recognized by the present-day Japanese Communist Party as its predecessor. However, several former members of the party took part in the founding of the Japanese Communist Party in 1922.

== Founding ==
Kondō Eizō met Sen Katayama in the United States and planned on creating a communist party in Japan upon returning to Japan in May 1919. Eizō, Hitoshi Yamakawa, and Sakai Toshihiko held secret meetings in 1921, where they planned the creation of the party. They based their platform off of the that of the Communist Party of Great Britain. A committee was formed with Sakai as chair. The Enlightened People's Communist Party was formed on August 20, 1921.

The founding group of the party consisted of radical intellectuals, many of them former students of Waseda University and members of the Society of Enlightened People. The founding meeting, held in secret, adopted a party platform and constitution. An executive committee was elected (with Kondo as its chairman), as well as four other committees (Finance Committee, led by Nakasone Genwa; Investigation Committee, led by Hirata Shinsaku; Publication Committee, led by Takase Kiyoshi; Propaganda Committee, led by Takatsu Seido).

According to Smith, the actual identity of the party is unclear. Kondo's testimonies stated that the organization called itself the "Communist Party" but Takase's testimonies give a slightly different view. According to Takase, the name of the organization was "Gyōmin Communist Group" and was more of an informal association than a structured party. However, the leaflets distributed by the organization were signed "Communist Party Headquarters".

== Propaganda work ==
Less than a month after the founding meeting, the party began to distribute propaganda in Tokyo, Osaka, Kobe and Kyoto. In early October 1921, the party began distributing propaganda posters. In November, the party circulated two sets of anti-militarist/anti-war leaflets to soldiers, who had gathered in the Tokyo area for a large-scale military exercise.

== International links ==
The party sought to establish links with the Communist International. Before founding the party, Kondo had the ambition to attend the third congress of the Comintern himself (held in the summer of 1921). Soon after the founding of the party a Waseda University student, Shigeta Yoshi, was sent to Shanghai with a number of documents of the party. On November 25, 1921, Shigeta returned to Japan, accompanied by a European Comintern representative.

Moreover, the party was contacted by a Comintern representative visiting Japan with the request to send a delegate to the Congress of the Peoples of the Far East. The party decided to send Takase, head of the Publications Committee. Takase was one of four persons representing Japan at the congress.

== Repression ==
The propaganda of the party caught the attention of police forces at an early stage. On October 12, 1921, the first wave of arrests of party activists took place. After the anti-militarist action in Tokyo in November, the state cracked down on the party. On November 25, 1921, Kondo, Shigeta and the Comintern representative "B. Grey" were arrested. Within a week 40 party activists were arrested. These arrests marked the end of the existence of the party. B. Grey was expelled from Japan, and the funds he had taken with him were confiscated.

== Works cited ==
- Beckmann, George M.; Okubo, Genji (1969). The Japanese Communist Party 1922–1945. Stanford, Calif: Stanford University Press.
- Scalapino, Robert (1967). The Japanese Communist Movement, 1920-1966. University of California Press.
- Smith, Henry DeWitt (1972). Japan's First Student Radicals. Cambridge, Massachusetts: Harvard University Press.
