= March 15 incident =

1928 crackdown on communists in Japan

The March 15 incident (三・一五事件, San ichi-go jiken) was a crackdown on socialists and communists by the Japanese government in 1928. Among those who were arrested in the incident was the Marxist economist Kawakami Hajime.

== Background ==
Although the Japan Communist Party had been outlawed and forced underground immediately after its foundation in 1922, it continued to gather strength and membership in the volatile social and economic climate of the 1920s Taishō period. During the February 1928 general election, which was the first held in Japan since the passage of universal male suffrage, the Japan Communist Party was very visible in its support of the legal socialist and labor-oriented political parties. Alarmed by gains that those parties made in the Diet of Japan, the conservative government of Prime Minister Giichi Tanaka, which had retained its majority by only one seat, evoked the provisions of the 1925 Peace Preservation Law and ordered the mass arrest of known communists and socialists and their sympathizers. The arrests occurred throughout Japan, and a total of 1652 people were apprehended.

== Consequences ==
About 500 of those arrested were eventually prosecuted in a series of open trials held by the Tokyo District Court starting on 15 June 1932, with sentencing on 2 July 1932. The public trials were carefully staged to publicize the inner workings of the secretive Japan Communist Party. With its connections with the labor movement and other left-wing political parties revealed, the government was able to order the dissolution of the Rōdō Nōmintō (Labor-Farmer Party), the Zen Nihon Musan Seinen Dōmei (All-Japan Proletarian Youth League), and the Nihon Rōdō Kumiai Hyōgikai (Council of Japanese Labor Unions). The defendants in the trials were all found guilty and sentenced to stiff jail terms, but those who recanted their communist ideology were then pardoned or given much reduced terms. That was the beginning of the tenkō policy designed to reintegrate former leftists to mainstream society. Perhaps more importantly, as a consequence of the trials, Prime Minister Tanaka was able to pass legislation to add the provision for the death penalty to the already-draconian Peace Preservation Laws.

The writer Kobayashi Takiji later wrote March 15, 1928 based on the incident.
