= Muto Sanji =

Japanese politician (1867–1934)

- 武藤 山治
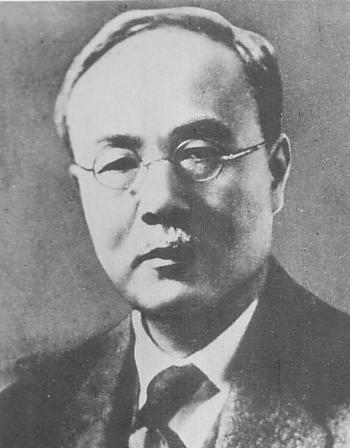
- Born: April 5, 1867
- Died: March 10, 1934 (aged 66)
- Education: Keio University
- Known for: Businessman, Politician, Publisher
- Children: Itoji Mutō

Sanji Muto (武藤 山治, 1867–1934) was born on April 5, 1867, in Aichi Prefecture, Japan, and later grew up in what is now known as Gifu Prefecture. He was the son of a wealthy village headman who was a strong advocate for education, influenced by the ideas of Fukuzawa Yukichi, particularly after reading "Seiyō Jijō.”

Muto attended Keiō Gijuku, now part of Keio University, where he had the opportunity to study directly under Fukuzawa Yukichi. At Keiō, Muto was introduced to British educational methods, which offered a striking contrast to his traditional Confucian background. This exposure ignited Muto's ambition to study at University of Cambridge in England.

Graduating from Keiō University in 1884, Muto was poised to pursue further education abroad. However, his plans were derailed by the "Matsukata Deflation," a severe economic downturn that gravely affected farmers and landlords, including Muto's family. Although his father had set aside funds for his education, these plans were thwarted when a relative, who owed money to Muto's father, was bankrupted by the deflation and unable to repay the debt. As a result, Muto was forced to abandon his dream of studying in England.

== Initial challenges and American experience ==
In 1885, at the age of 19, Sanji Muto embarked on a journey to San Francisco, joining the first group of Kanyaku Imin, or government-contracted immigrants, alongside two alumni from Keio University. This move, inspired by Fukuzawa Yukichi's encouragement for Muto to pioneer the development of Japanese communities in the United States, marked a pivotal shift in his life's trajectory.

Unlike government-sponsored students, Muto adopted the role of a dekasegi-shosei, a self-financing student, bearing the costs of his tuition and living expenses for three years. During this period, Muto undertook various jobs to support himself. He worked in a tobacco factory in San Francisco and served as a waiter at the University of the Pacific. Concurrently, he pursued his studies in English, Math, History, and Latin, and developed an interest in Victorian literature, particularly Bertha M. Clay's "Dora Thorne."

Muto also engaged in entrepreneurial ventures. He collaborated with Takashima Kokinji of Ōkura-kumi (Okura Partners) in marketing Kikkoman's soy sauce. Demonstrating innovation, he developed a Western-style sauce named "Mikado Sauce," a blend of soy sauce, vinegar, and red pepper, presented in distinctive triangle-shaped Japanese ceramics priced at thirty-five cents. While the sauce initially attracted attention due to the novelty of its packaging, it struggled to gain lasting popularity among American consumers.

After various jobs and entrepreneurial efforts, including the unsuccessful Mikado Sauce venture, Muto decided to close his store and return to Japan, having spent two years in the United States.

== Return to Japan and business ventures ==
Upon his return to Japan embarked on a multifaceted and influential business career. His first significant contribution was the publication of "Beikoku Ijū Ron" (United States Migration Theory), a work inspired by his experiences in the U.S. In this publication, Muto advocated for increased Japanese immigration to the U.S., drawing comparisons between the successes of Chinese immigrants in America and the potential for Japanese immigrants. He highlighted the advantages available in America, such as the respectful treatment of domestic workers and the opportunities for income and education, especially in the developing state of California. His advocacy held particular relevance for those affected by the "Matsukata Deflation" in Japan.

Muto also ventured into the business world by establishing an advertising agency, introducing a concept that was relatively novel in Japan at the time. In addition to his entrepreneurial efforts, Muto also engaged in journalism and language services, working as a reporter and translator. Later, Muto joined C. Illies & Co., a German trading firm. His tenure at this company marked the beginning of his ascent in the business sector. Following this experience, he transitioned to Mitsui Bank in 1893, where he played a crucial role in its financial reform. In 1894, he joined the Mitsui subsidiary, Kanegafuchi Spinning Company (later known as Kanebo), ascending to the position of president by 1921.

At Kanebo, Muto introduced groundbreaking changes in labor practices and employee welfare. He reformed the harsh working conditions typical of Japanese spinning factories at the time, which involved strenuous 12-hour shifts without consideration for age or gender. Under his leadership, Kanebo set the standard for the highest wages, best working conditions, and most comprehensive benefits in Japan, as observed by historian Richard Mitchell. Muto's humane approach included initiatives like establishing a nursery for employees' infants, publishing in-house newsletters, and founding the "Kanebo Mutual Aid Association," a forerunner to Japan's modern health insurance system.

Muto was also at the forefront of technological innovation and business strategy at Kanebo. He introduced the Toyota automatic loom, making Kanebo the first Japanese spinning company to adopt this technology. Following the Russo-Japanese War in 1904, he expanded production to include cotton cloth. His innovative strategies encompassed endorsing newspaper advertisements, leading corporate acquisitions, diversifying product lines, and integrating foreign capital. Under his stewardship, Kanebo experienced exponential growth in net sales and income, establishing it as Japan's largest and most profitable spinning company.

== Political career ==
Sanji Muto's political career was significantly shaped by the Russo-Japanese War (1904–05) and its impact on Japanese society, as well as the personal loss of his younger brother in the conflict. The government's inadequate support for families of sick veterans and those mourning lost loved ones, capped at ¥50 per year, propelled Sanji into politics. He viewed this support as insufficient and inhumane and sought to advocate for better legislative protections for those affected by the war. His commitment to this cause was further intensified by his personal tragedy, leading him to fund research and collaborate with politicians in 1917.

In 1921, the same year he became the president of Kanebo, Sanji published "Political Renewal Theory," advocating for the election of prime ministers by popular vote with a term limit of about three years. He further expanded his political involvement in 1923 by founding the Industrial and Business Party, serving as its first chairman. Elected to the Imperial Diet in 1924, Sanji managed to juggle his political responsibilities alongside his role at Kanebo. In his 1926 manifesto, "Business Politics," he critiqued the Japanese state's control over various sectors, drawing parallels with Soviet practices and suggesting that Japan was inadvertently leaning towards socialism.

Sanji resigned from his position at Kanebo in 1930. In 1931, he founded Kokumin Kaikan, a public interest incorporated association aimed at fostering political awareness and understanding among the Japanese populace. He retired from the Diet in 1932, expressing frustration over the slow progress in political education and the widespread lack of understanding of politics among both politicians and the public. He predicted that it would take a century for political education to firmly establish itself in Japan.

== Publishing career ==
Following his departure from active politics, Sanji Muto was approached to revitalize the newspaper Jiji shimpō (“Current Events”), originally published by his mentor and prominent intellectual, Yukichi Fukuzawa. Sanji accepted the responsibility in 1932. His tenure at Jiji Shinpo was marked by significant innovations, notably the introduction of color printing to the Japanese newspaper industry. He also began writing daily editorials, a practice that would significantly impact his career.

One notable series of editorials penned by Sanji focused on the Teijin scandal, a high-profile case of alleged insider trading that emerged in January 1934. These pieces scrutinized the involvement of numerous politicians, bureaucrats, and businessmen in the illicit buying and selling of imperial silk stocks. Through his editorials, Sanji aimed to shed light on the corrupt entanglement of politics, government service, and industry within Japan's growing capitalist economy. His candid and critical approach in these editorials made it evident that the individuals implicated were disconcerted by the exposure. This journalistic endeavor underscored Sanji's commitment to transparency and ethical conduct in both the public and private sectors.

== Death ==
On March 9, 1934, Sanji's life came to a sudden and tragic end, just two weeks after initiating a campaign against corruption in business and political circles. That morning, Sanji left his home in Kita Kamakura at 9:15 AM, accompanied by an assistant, to travel to his office in Tokyo. During their 20-minute walk to the train station, Sanji was approached by Fukushima Shinkichi, a 41-year-old unemployed salesman, who shot him fatally five times. Immediately after the attack, Fukushima committed suicide, an act that also resulted in the death of Sanji's secretary.

Sanji succumbed to his injuries the following day, dying aged 66. Many believe that his assassination was connected to his recent journalistic endeavours, particularly his critical writings on corrupt practices. These efforts are thought to have played a role in the arrests related to the Teijin Scandal, which involved a sitting minister, several bureaucrats, and the president of Teijin, a textile company. In total, 16 individuals were implicated in the scandal, though they were ultimately acquitted due to a lack of sufficient evidence.
