= Proletarian Masses Party =

Political party in Japan

The Proletarian Masses Party (無産大衆党, Musan Taishūtō) was a short-lived political party in Japan. It was founded on July 22, 1928 by the Rōnō faction (that had belonged to the Labour-Farmer Party, before that party was banned in April 1928). Suzuki Mosaburō became the general secretary of the party. Yamakawa and Sakai Toshihiko functioned as 'elder' advisors in the party. Other prominent founders of the party were Kuroda, Inamura Junzo and Okada.

The Proletarian Masses Party claimed to have around 2,500 members. At the time of its foundation, the party declared its intention to struggle against leftwing sectarianism and rightwing disruptionism. The founders of the party were critical of the leadership of Oyama Ikuo in the remains of the Labour-Farmer Party, claiming that Oyama Ikuo was too hostile to a merger with the centrist Japan Labour-Farmer Party. The party was in fierce competition with the Oyama Ikuo-led group over the loyalty of former Labour-Farmer Party activists and sympathizers.

In October 1928 a women's organization linked to the Proletarian Masses Party, the Proletarian Women's Alliance, was founded.

On December 20, 1928 the party merged with the Japan Labour-Farmer Party, the Japan Farmers Party and four regional political parties, to create the Japan Masses Party. The women's wing merged with the centrist National Women's League in January 1929, founding the Proletarian Women's League.
