= Japan Proletarian Party =

Japanese leftist political party

Japan Proletarian Party 日本無産党 Nihon Musantō
- Founder: Suzuki Mosaburō; Katō Kanjū
- Founded: March 1937
- Banned: 23 December 1937
- Ideology: Anti–Shakai Taishūtō; Revolutionary socialism Socialism; Agrarian socialism
- Political position: Left-wing to far-left

Japan Proletarian Party (日本無産党, Nihon Musantō) was a short-lived leftist political party in early Shōwa period Japan.

The Nihon Musantō was founded by Suzuki Mosaburō and Katō Kanjū (1892–1978) in March 1937, as a political wing of the labor union movement. Katō, its chairman, won a seat in the 1937 general election, but the party failed to create much popular support against the rising forces of militarism and against the rising inflation in the Japanese economy.

In December 1937, its members were arrested in the Popular Front Incident, and the party was disbanded.
