= General Federation of Japanese Peasant Unions =

The General Federation of Japanese Peasant Unions (日本農民組合総同盟, Nihon nōminkumiai sōdōmei) was a farmers' organization in Japan. The organization was formed on March 7, 1927. It was an initiative of the Social Democratic Party to gain ground amongst the peasantry. The organization functioned as the rural counterpart of the Sodomei trade union centre.

According to Beckmann and Okubo, the launching of the General Federation of Japanese Peasant Unions was a dismal failure, and that it was only able to recruit some 300-400 peasants in the Kanto area. According to their account, the organization was limited by the fact that its leadership was composed of urban Sodomei labour leaders with little contacts in rural areas. K. Matsuoka, a Social Democratic Party leader, however, claimed that the organization had over 35,000 members as of 1930. At that time, the organization was seeking unification with the All-Japan Peasant Union. The merger was finalized in 1931, as the two organization unified into the (new) Japan Peasant Union (not to be confused with the older organization with the same name).
