= Popular Front Incident =

1937-1938 Japanese suppression of socialists and communists

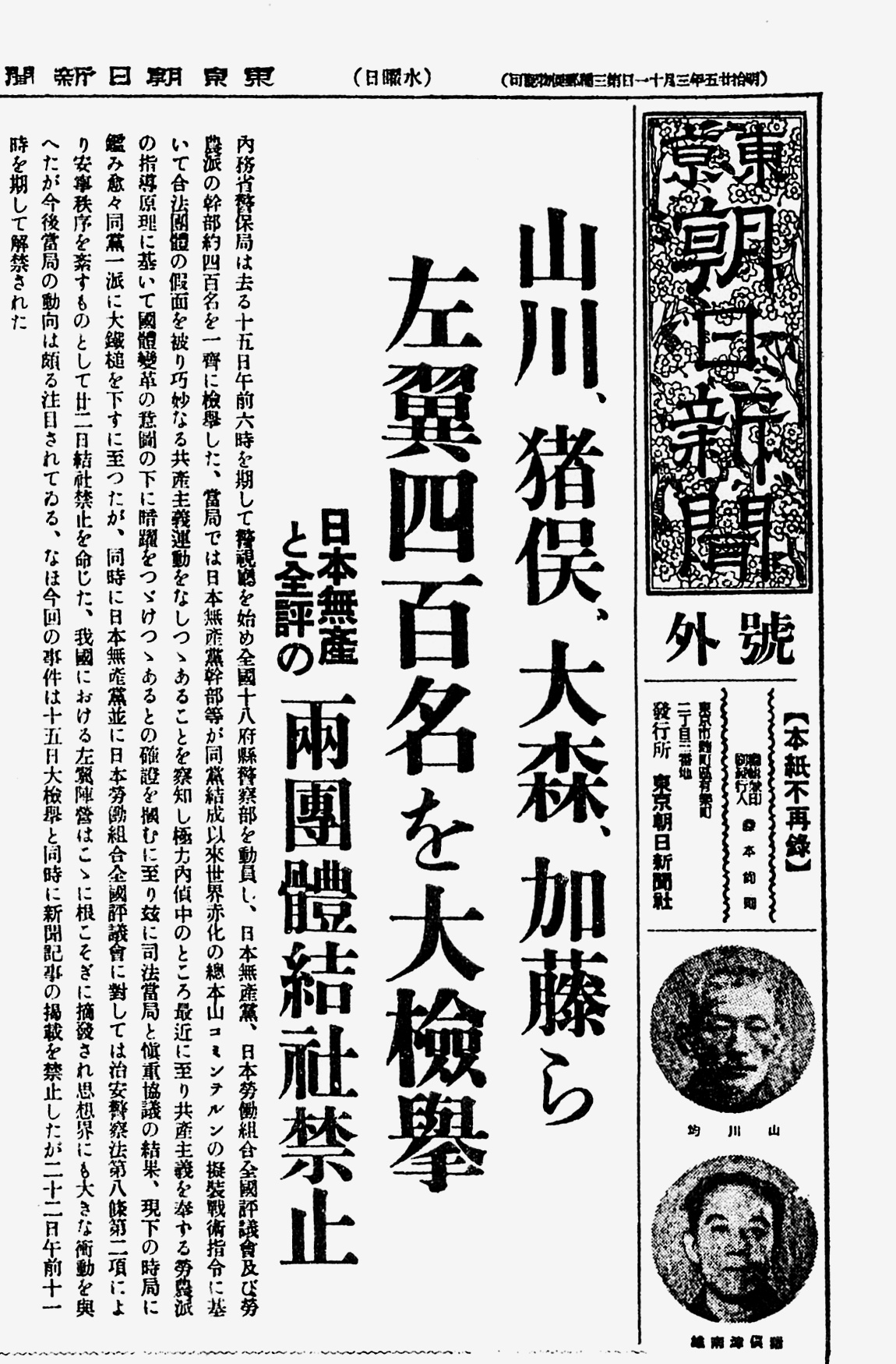
Tokyo Asahi Shimbun's coverage of the first wave of arrests

The Popular Front Incident (人民戦線事件, Jinmin sensen jiken) refers to the Imperial Japanese government's suppression of a perceived threat from socialists and communists after the fall of Nanjing during the Shōwa period. During the incident, approximately 400 people were arrested by the authorities between December 1937 and February 1938. Amongst those arrested during the incident were Kanson Arahata, Saburō Eda, Ryōkichi Minobe, Itsurō Sakisaka, Kōzō Sasaki, Mosaburō Suzuki, Minoru Takano, and Hitoshi Yamakawa.

== See also ==
- Japanese dissidence during the Shōwa period
- Yokohama Incident
