= Labour-Farmer Party =

Labour-Farmer Party 労働農民党 Rōdōnōmintō
- Leader: Motojirō Sugiyama, Oyama Ikuo
- Founded: 1 March 1926
- Dissolved: 11 April 1928
- Preceded by: Farmer-Labour Party
- Succeeded by: Japan Masses Party
- Headquarters: Tokyo
- Membership (1926): 7,967
- Ideology: Socialism
- Political position: Left-wing

1928 electoral poster of the Labour-Farmer Party candidate Oyama Ikuo. Text reads "Under the Labour-Farmer Party, Give Us Food and Give Us Work!", "Give Us Land and Freedom!", "Vote for the representative of the Proletariat!"

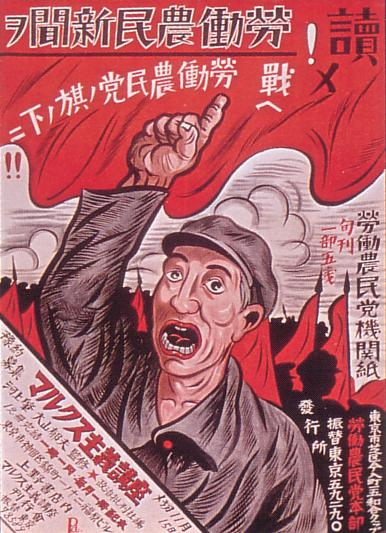
1928 electoral poster of the Labour-Farmer Party

The Labour-Farmer Party (労働農民党, Rōdōnōmintō) was a political party in the Empire of Japan. It represented the left-wing sector of the legal proletarian movement at the time. Oyama Ikuo was the chairman of the party. At the time the party was banned by the government in 1928, it was estimated to have around 90,000 members in 131 local organizations. The party was supported by the Hyōgikai trade union federation and the Japan Peasant Union.

== Foundation ==
The Rōdōnōmintō was founded in March 1926 as a continuation of the Farmer-Labour Party (which had been founded in December 1925, but banned after only two hours of existence). The party was founded by the Sodomei trade union centre, the Japan Labour Union Federation (a Sodomei splinter group), the Japan Peasant Union, the Seamen's Union and the Federation of Government Employees. The Japan Peasant Union leader Motojirō Sugiyama became the chairman of the party, Nagawa, Abe, Aso and Nishio were included in its Central Committee.

Three members of the Central Committee of the party, Matsuda Kiichi, Ueda Onshi and Saiko Bankichi, were also leaders in the Suiheisha movement.

== Party platforms ==
The platform of the Rōdōnōmintō stated that the goal of the organization was the political, social and economic emancipation of the proletarian class, and through legal means work advocate agrarian reform and re-distribution of production. According to the party platform the established political parties represented the interests of the privileged classes, and that the Rōdōnōmintō sought their overthrow and reform of the parliamentary system. Other demands raised in the platform included universal suffrage (for all persons above 20 years of age), right to form trade unions and to organize strikes, collective bargaining, minimum wages, 8-hour working day, women's rights, free education, increased legal rights to tenant farmers, progressive taxation and the democratization of the military leadership.

At the time of its foundation, a party by-law was passed stating that only members of the constituent organizations of the party could acquire party membership. This was done to prevent communists and other left-wing elements to gain influence inside the organization. The anti-communist sectors wanted to block members of leftwing groups like Hyōgikai, the Proletarian Youth League and the Society for Political Studies from joining the party. However, large sections of the party considered this by-law as impeding the formation of a single, unified party of the proletarian movement. The by-law was hotly debated within the party leadership. Oyama Ikuo and other younger militants of the Japan Peasant Union demanded that the by-law be scrapped. The result was a compromise, that membership was open for those individuals who were approved by the party branch in question.

The compromise did however not prevent splits in the party. The extreme right-wing faction inside the party (represented by section of older Japan Peasant Union leaders such as Okabe Kansuke and Hirano Rikizō ) was the first dissident group to desert the party. In October 1926 they formed the Japan Farmers Party. On October 24, 1926, Sodomei and other trade unions withdrew from the party. The party leadership was now in the hands of Oyama Ikuo, Mizutani Chozaburo and Hososako Kanemitsu, and all restrictions on party membership were scrapped. Sodomei and other moderate sectors founded the Social Democratic Party in December 1926.

In September 1926, the Rōdōnōmintō and Hyōgikai started a campaign to demand the introduction of five pieces of legislation; a minimum wage law, an 8-hour working day law, a health insurance law, a working women's protection law and a law for unemployment benefits.

On December 12, 1926, the Rōdōnōmintō held its first convention. The convention elected Oyama Ikuo as party chairman and Hososako general secretary.

The revolutionary left was also divided within own ranks. After the disbanding of the first Japanese Communist Party in 1924, leftwing cadres had joined the Labour-Farmer Party. One sector (the Fukumoto group) wanted to reconstitute the Communist Party and concentrated their work on underground organizing, whilst Sakai Toshihiko, Yamakawa Kikue, Yamakawa Hitoshi and their sympathizers focused on building the legal Labour-Farmer Party. By the end of 1926, the Fukomoto group dominated both the reconstituted Communist Party and the Labour-Farmer Party, holding key strategic positions inside the latter.

In March 1927, the Communist International intervened. A meeting was held in Moscow, in which Bukharin, M. N. Roy, J. T. Murphy and Béla Kun participated, along with Fukumoto and other Japanese communist leaders. Both Yamakawa and Fukumoto were condemned in the thesis issued by the Communist International. Yamakawa was denounced as a "liquidationist", while Fukumoto was branded as "sectarian". The Communist Party of Japan was instructed to organize itself as a vanguard party, working with and within mass organizations like the Labour-Farmer Party. In December 1927, the Yamakawa group began publishing the monthly journal Rōnō, borrowing the name of the Labour-Farmer Party for their factional organ.

In the midst of financial crisis that hit Japan in the spring of 1927, the party stepped up its propaganda work, launching a campaign to call for early elections.

The Kantō Women's League, a women's organization connected to the party, was founded on July 3, 1927. The Kantō Women's League was dissolved in March 1928, after the party had issued a directive against the existence of a separate organization for women. The change of position regarding the women's organization was a side-effect of the factional battle inside the party.

Regarding the Chinese question, the party opposed the Japanese government policy and ran a "Hands off China" campaign. The party was supportive of the leftist Wang Jingwei. The party aided the foundation of the Taiwan Peasant Union and supported its struggles against the agricultural policies of the Japanese governor-general on the island.

== Electoral activity ==
The party launched 108 candidates in the 1927 prefectural elections, out of whom 13 were elected (nine from rural areas, four from urban areas). The bulk of the votes for the party came from areas where its Japan Peasant Union was more active; Kagawa, Niigata, Akita and Hyōgo. The combined vote of the candidates of the party stood at 119,169.

Ahead of the 1928 national Diet elections the Labour-Farmer Party issued a list of radical demands, calling for the abolition of all forms of discrimination of subject races and reductions of the size of the armed forces. Slogans such as "Establish a Worker-Peasant Government" and "Long live the dictatorship of the proletariat" were raised in the election campaign.

However, there was considerable government interference against the electoral campaigns of the Labour-Farmer Party. Electoral meetings were interrupted by police and election campaign workers were often arbitrarily arrested. Night after night, police forces interrupted the campaign speeches of Oyama Ikuo. His campaign headquarters in the Kagawa Prefecture constituency (where he stood as candidate, facing the incumbent finance minister) were raided by police.

Amongst the candidates of the party were eleven communists. Kyuichi Tokuda, who later became the general secretary of the Communist Party, stood as a candidate of the party. Another communist, the trade union organizer Kenzo Yamamoto, was a Labour-Farmer Party candidate in Hokkaido.

All in all the party supported 40 candidates in the elections, whom together mustered 181,141 votes (1.9% of the nationwide vote). Banno, however, states that the combined vote of the 40 Labour-Farmer Party candidates was 193,047. According to Banno's account, 77% of the votes for the party came from rural areas (the party had launched 32 rural and 8 urban candidates). Two of the candidates of the party were elected, Yamamoto Senji and Mizutani Chozaburo.

Following the election the three proletarian parties in the assembly (the Labour-Farmer Party, the Japan Labour-Farmer Party and the Social Democratic Party) managed to form a joint parliamentary committee, in spite of their political contradictions.

== Dissolution ==
With the 15 March incident, a wave of repression was directed against the leftwing in Japan. Around 1,600 persons were arrested and accused of being communist activists. The Labour-Farmer Party was banned by the Home Ministry on April 11, 1928, after accusations arose of links to the communists. Hyōgikai was banned on the same day.

After the Labour-Farmer Party had been banned, the government attempted to expel its representatives from the Lower House of the Diet of Japan. However they lacked any legal basis to do so, and the two Labour-Farmer Party continued in their parliamentary functions. Yamamoto Senji, who was elected as a Labour-Farmer Party candidate for Kyoto at the first general election under universal suffrage held in February 1928, spoke in the Imperial Diet on February 8 1929, inquiring about the torture and illegal detention of prisoners by the police, who had boasted of being the "Amakasu of Showa". He was preparing his speech for the Diet in February, but was killed by a right-wing assassin at an inn in the Kanda district of Tokyo on February 29, on the same day as he had presented testified in the Diet regarding torture of prisoners.

There would be several different attempts by leftists to recreate a party representing the Labour-Farmer Party legacy. Immediately after the disbanding of the Labour-Farmer Party, the Communist Party instructed its cadres to rebuild the party. The goal to achieve unification with the Japan Labour-Farmer Party was retained. A reorganization committee was formed (named the 'Committee for the Rebuilding of the Labour-Farmer Party and Preparation for New Party'). Oyama Ikou served as the chairman of the committee and Hososako as the general secretary. The committee was quickly banned by the government, but continued to function illegally. In July 1928 the Rōnō faction broke away from the committee and founded the Proletarian Masses Party. In December 1928 the Proletarian Masses Party merged with the Japan Labour-Farmer Party, forming the Japan Masses Party. In the same month the Oyama Ikuo group held a refoundation conference of the Labour-Farmer Party, but the party was again banned swiftly. In January 1929 Mizutani Chozaburo denounced his former comraders of the Labour-Farmer Party as 'too communistic', thus ending the continuity of the Labour-Farmer Party parliamentary faction. In November 1929 Oyama Ikuo and his followers founded the New Labour-Farmer Party. After having formed this party a final break between Oyama Ikuo and the communists occurred, and the communists began labelling him as a 'traitor'.
