= Ikuo Oyama =

Japanese political scientist (1880–1955)

- 大山 郁夫
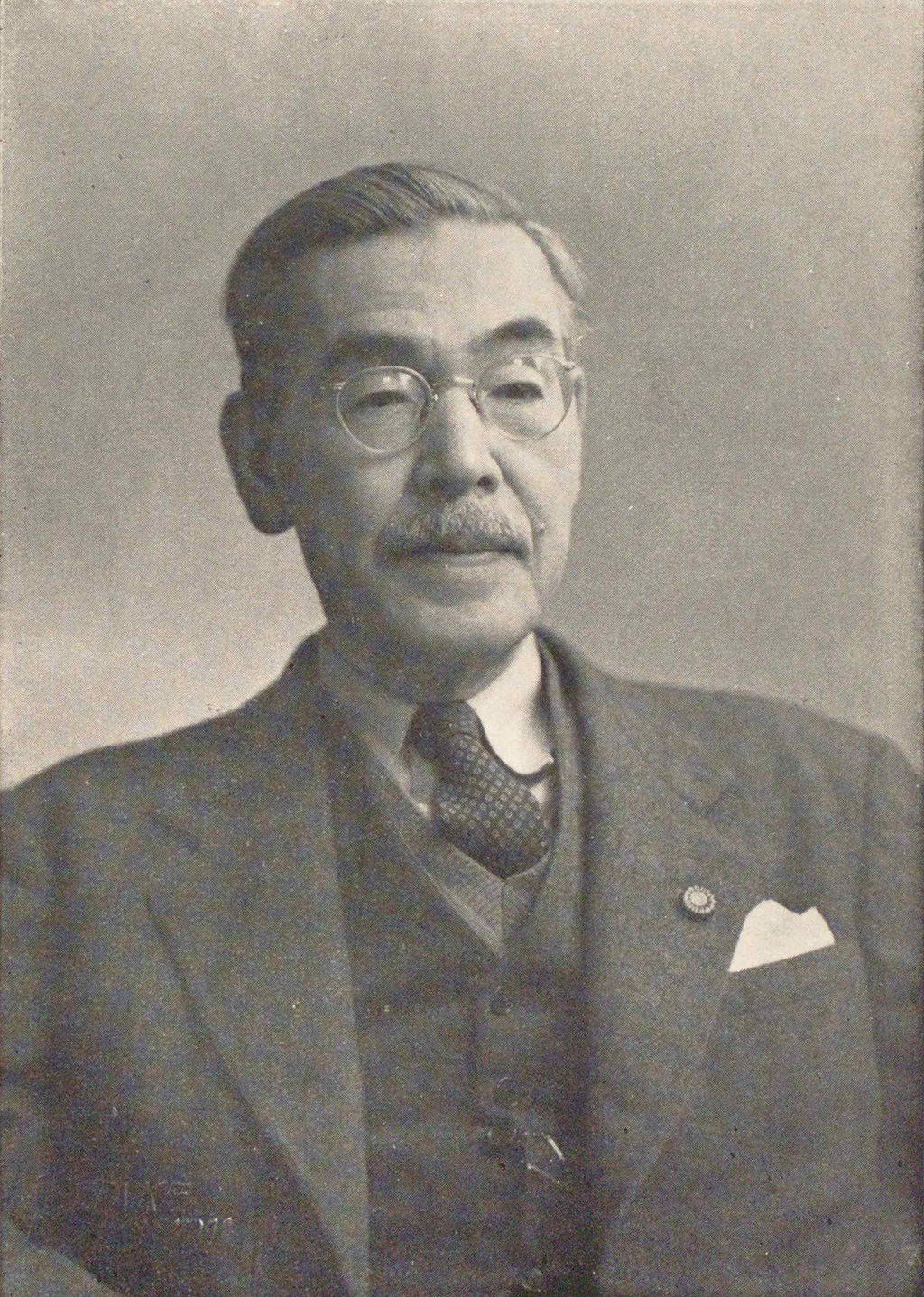

Member of the House of Councillors
- In office 5 June 1950 – 30 November 1955
- Preceded by: Shuichiro Oku
- Succeeded by: Hideo Konishi
- Constituency: Kyoto at-large

Member of the House of Representatives
- In office 21 February 1930 – 21 January 1932
- Preceded by: Yasunosuke Satō
- Succeeded by: Hideo Mikami
- Constituency: Tokyo 5th

Personal details
- Born: 20 September 1880 Akō, Hyōgo, Japan
- Died: 30 November 1955 (aged 75)
- Cause of death: Subdural hematoma
- Party: Independent
- Other political affiliations: Labour-Farmer (1926–1928)
- Education: Waseda University; Chicago University; Ludwig-Maximilians-Universität München
- Occupation: Academic; Politician
- Awards: Stalin Peace Prize (1951)

Ikuo Oyama (大山 郁夫, Ōyama Ikuo) (20 September 1880 – 30 November 1955) was a Japanese academic, politician, political scientist and writer.

== Life in Prewar Japan ==
Ikuo Oyama was born on 20 September 1880. He graduated from Waseda University in 1905. After studying at the University of Chicago and the Ludwig-Maximilians-Universität München, he became a professor of Waseda University in 1915. In 1926, he became chairman of the Labour-Farmer Party.

In 1928, the Labour-Farmer Party was banned due to accusations of having links to communism. The same year in 1928 the Communist International had denounced Oyama as a "social democrat and a handmaiden of the capitalist imperialists.". By the time Oyama had founded the Labor Farmer Party in 1928 he had severed all connection with the Communist Party.

Yamamoto Senji, a colleague of Oyama, was assassinated on the same day as he had presented testimony in the Japanese Diet regarding torture of prisoners.

== Life in the United States ==
Oyama went to live in the United States in 1932. By 1945 he was doing research and teaching at Northwestern University under the patronage of American Japanese specialist Kenneth Colegrove. Ikuo Oyama would serve as Colegrove's assistant for research of Japanese Political Science in Northwestern University. In 1947, Colegrove would denounce Ikuo Oyama after Oyama began to advocate a common front between Socialists and Communists against the Japanese government and GHQ.

During his time in the United States he worked closely with the US Government. In 1945 John K. Emmerson approached Oyama to discuss the former Labor Farmer Party politician's role in postwar Japan.

According to Emmerson, Oyama was against the removal of the Emperor by the Allied powers but was confident that the Japanese themselves would reform the imperial institution. In addition, Oyama hoped that the Japanese constitution would be revised to establish a genuine party government and guarantee the freedom of speech and press.

By 1945 Oyama had been receiving letters from Japanese anti-war activists Nosaka Sanzo, and Kaji Wataru that requested for Oyama to assume leadership of an "international organization of Japanese". However Oyama was hesitant to openly endorse such a group for fear of endangering the lives of his followers back in Japan.

In a banquet held in his honor in Honolulu following the surrender of Japan, Oyama revealed that the US government requested he return to Japan as a "sort of" representative of the US. Oyama refused, instead stating that he wanted to return to Japan as an independent person and participate in the democratic reconstruction of Japan.

== Life in Postwar Japan ==
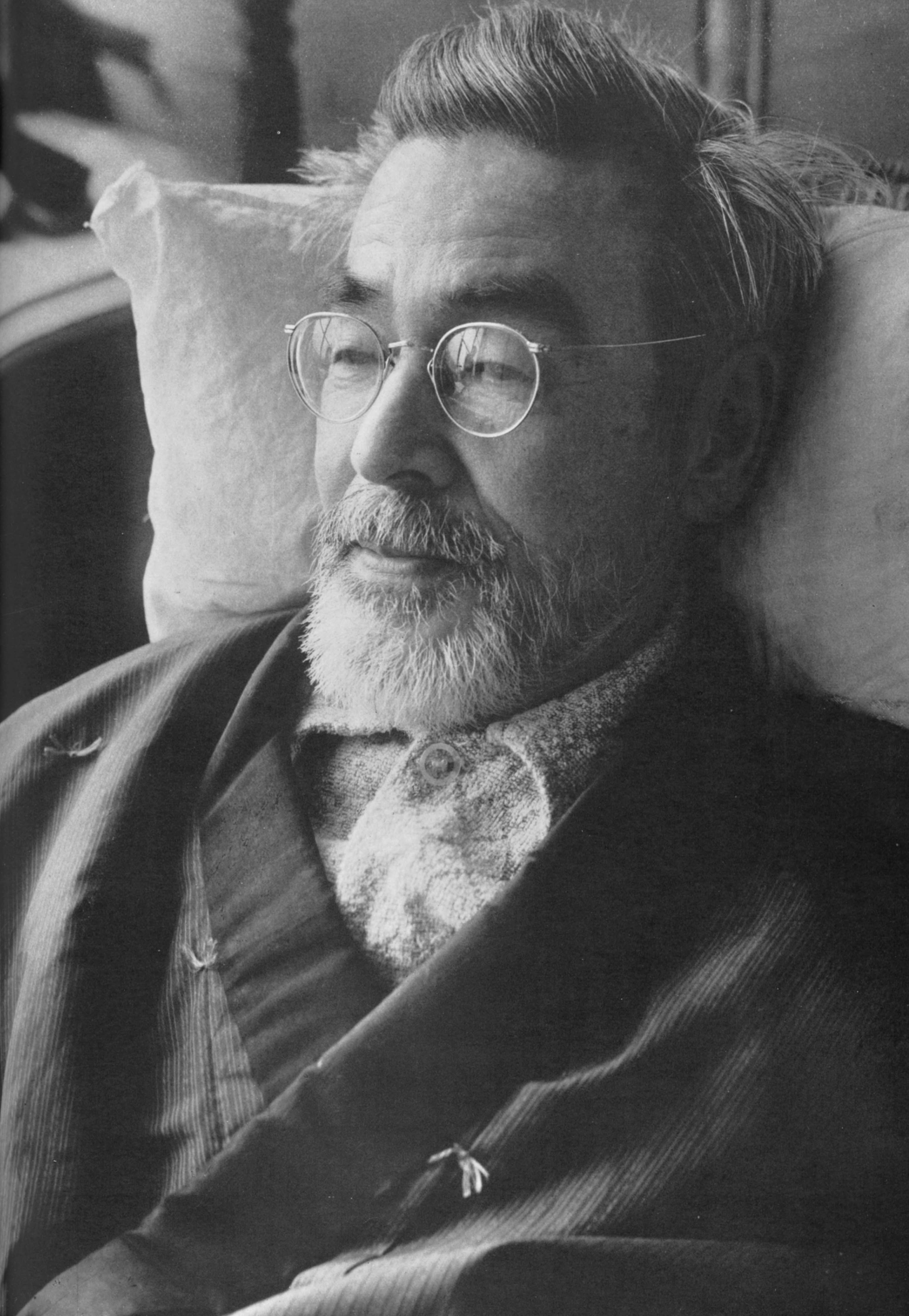
Ikuo Oyama in 1951, photo by Ken Domon

He returned to Japan after the end of World War II. He was elected as a member of the House of Councillors in 1951. Oyama happily shook hands with Zhou Enlai, even though Japan and the People's Republic of China did not have diplomatic relations during his lifetime. Oyama was given a Stalin Award prize on 20 December 1951. However, his colleagues begged him not to accept the award for fear that he would become a Soviet puppet. Some of his oldest friends abandoned him when he accepted it.

During the occupation of Japan, Oyama was arrested for criticizing the occupation. One week after his arrest, he attended a rally led by Japanese Communist Party member Tokuda Kyuichi. In addition, Oyama was critical of the Yoshida Government, accusing the Yoshida Government of trying to oust Democratic Teachers from Universities.

Ikuo Oyama died of a subdural hematoma in 1955.

== See also ==
- Japanese dissidence during the Shōwa period
- Labour-Farmer Party
