= Japan Masses Party =

Japan Masses Party 日本大衆党
- Founded: December 1928
- Dissolved: June 1930
- Merger of: Japan Labour-Farmer Party; Japan Farmers Party; Proletarian Masses Party
- Merged into: National Masses Party
- Ideology: Revolutionary socialism Socialism; Agrarian socialism
- Political position: Left-wing to far-left

The Japan Masses Party (Japanese: 日本大衆党, Nihon Taishūtō) was a proletarian political party in Japan.

== History ==
The Japan Masses Party was established in December 1928 by a merger of the Japan Labour-Farmer Party (which had won one seat in the 1928 elections), the Japan Farmers Party, the Proletarian Masses Party and four other working-class parties. With both parties from the right and left having joined the new party, tensions soon arose, resulting in the expulsion of several members of parliament in May 1929.

With a campaign based on tenancy and unemployment issues, the party nominated 23 candidates in the February 1930 elections, winning two seats. In June 1930 it merged with the National Conference for a United Proletarian Party and the National People's Party to form the National Masses Party.
