= Social Democratic Party (Japan, 1926) =

Social Democratic Party 社会民衆党 Shakai Minshū-tō
- Chairperson: Abe Isoo
- Secretary-General: Tetsu Katayama
- Founded: December 5, 1926
- Dissolved: July 1, 1932
- Split from: Right-wing faction of Labour-Farmer Party
- Succeeded by: Social Masses Party
- Headquarters: Tokyo
- Membership (1929): 48,952
- Ideology: Social democracy Anti-capitalism; Anti-communism; Anti-fascism
- Political position: Centre-left to left-wing

The Social Democratic Party (社会民衆党, Shakai Minshū-tō) (a more accurate translation of the Japanese name would be "Social People's Party", but this naming is common in English texts) was a political party in Japan between 1926 and 1932. Amongst the three main proletarian parties in Japan at the time, the Social Democratic Party occupied a rightist position.

== History ==
The party was founded on December 5, 1926, by the Japan General Federation of Labour (Sōdōmei), other trade unions and the Independent Labour Association, an organization of moderate leftist intellectuals. Abe Isoo was elected chairman of the party. Suzuki Bunji, Nishio Suehiro, Katsumaro Akamatsu, Shimanaka Yuzō and Kagawa Toyohiko were Central Committee members of the party. The elements which formed the new party had belonged to the Labour-Farmer Party, which opposed the inclusion of leftists in the latter party. Sodomei and other trade union had pulled out of the Labour-Farmer Party on October 24, 1926. However, only four days after its foundation the new party suffered its first split, as leftwing socialists broke away and formed the Japan Labour-Farmer Party.

In March 1927 the General Federation of Japanese Peasant Unions was formed as the agrarian wing of the party. (Japanese: Nihon Nomin Kumiai Sodomei) was a farmers' organization in Japan. A women's organization linked to the party, the Social Women's League, was founded in November 1927. It changed its name to Social Democratic Women's League in July 1928.

Regarding the Chinese question, the party opposed the policies of the Japanese government, demanding a recognition of the Nanking government and encouragement of the Three Principles of Sun Yat-sen. In May 1927 the Social Democratic Party sent Miyazaki Ryusuke and Matsuoka Komakichi to Shanghai, where they met with Chiang Kai-shek. A solidarity agreement between the Social Democratic Party and the Kuomintang was signed.

Miyazaki Ryusuke left the party in 1929, forming the National Democratic Party.

The party won two seats in the 1930 national election.

The party merged with the National Labour-Farmer Masses Party in July 1932, forming the Social Masses Party.

== Election results ==
House of Representatives
| Election year | Candidates | Voter | # of seats | Change | Source |
|---|---|---|---|---|---|
| 1928 | 17 | 120,044 | 4 / 446 | Steady | |
| 1930 | 33 | 170,974 | 2 / 446 | ▼2 | |
| 1932 | - | - | 3 / 446 | ▲1 | |
