= 1928 Japanese general election =

- 20 February 1928

All 466 seats in the House of Representatives 234 seats needed for a majority
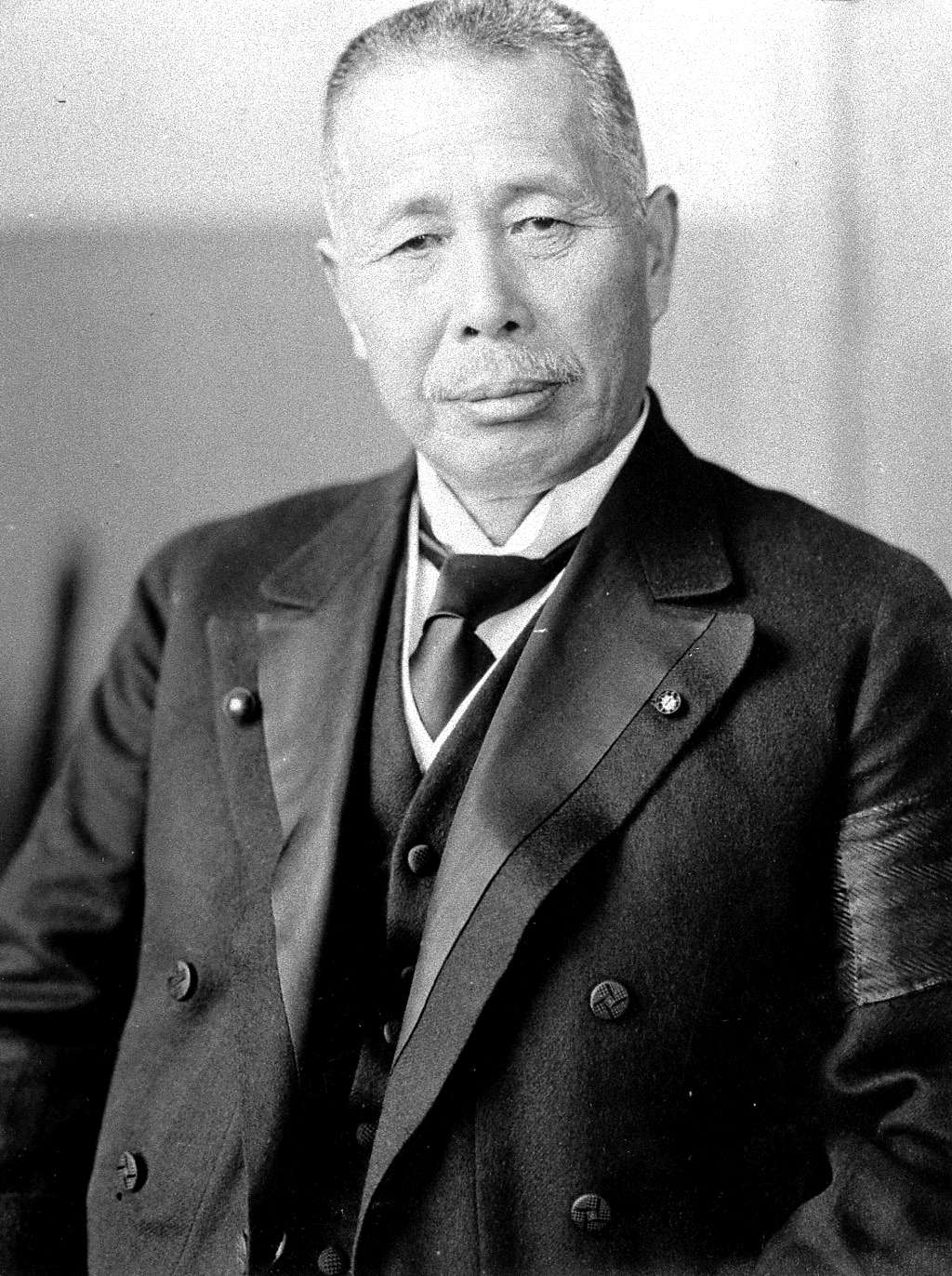

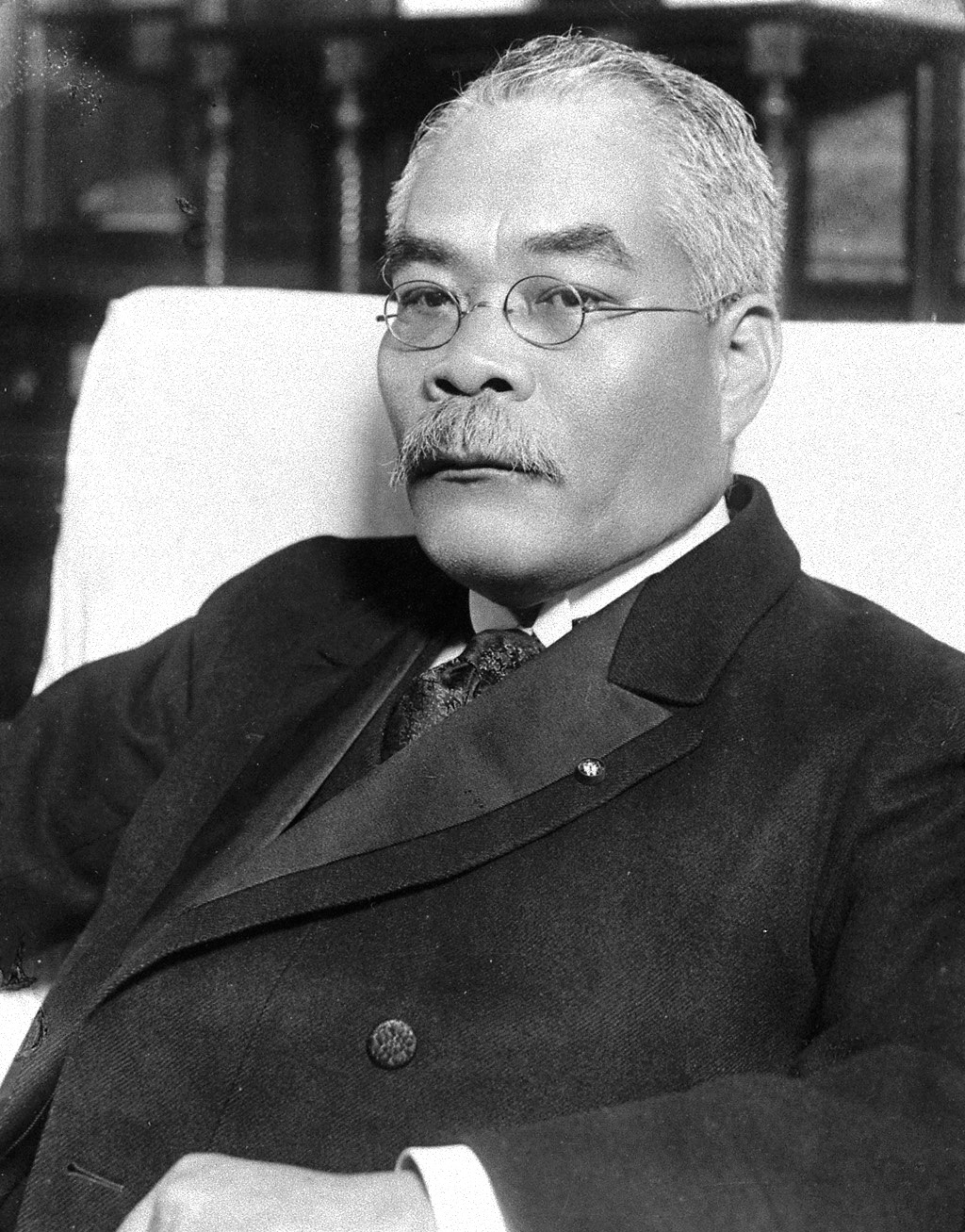
	First party	Second party
Leader	Tanaka Giichi	Hamaguchi Osachi
Party	Rikken Seiyūkai	Rikken Minseitō
Last election	22.41%, 103 seats	Did not exist
Seats won	217	216
Seat change	▲114	New
Popular vote	4,244,385	4,251,771
Percentage	43.06%	43.14%
Swing	▲20.86pp	New
- Districts shaded according to winners' vote strength
Prime Minister before election
Tanaka Giichi
Rikken Seiyūkai
Elected Prime Minister
Tanaka Giichi
Rikken Seiyūkai

General elections were held in Japan on 20 February 1928, the first after the passing of the Universal Manhood Suffrage Law in 1925 which introduced universal male suffrage for men 25 years and over. The ruling Rikken Seiyūkai led by Prime Minister Tanaka Giichi won one more seat than the opposition Constitutional Democratic Party led by Hamaguchi Osachi, although the Constitutional Democratic Party had received slightly more votes. The hung parliament led to the Tanaka government continuing in office.

== Electoral system ==
Following electoral reforms in 1925, the 466 members of the House of Representatives were elected from multi-member constituencies with between three and five seats. Voting had previously been restricted to men aged over 25 who paid at least 3 yen a year in direct taxation, but the reforms had also abolished the taxation requirement. As a result, the electorate increased from 3.3 million in the 1924 elections to 12.4 million.

== Results ==
Party	Votes	%	Seats	+/–
Constitutional Democratic Party	4,251,771	43.14	216	New
Rikken Seiyūkai	4,244,385	43.06	217	+114
Labour-Farmer Party	184,040	1.87	2	New
Jitsugyo Doshikai	166,250	1.69	4	New
Social Democratic Party	120,044	1.22	4	New
Japan Labour-Farmer Party	94,626	0.96	1	New
Kakushintō	81,324	0.83	3	New
Japan Farmers Party	44,000	0.45	0	New
Others	669,756	6.80	19	–50
Total	9,856,196	100.00	466	+2
Valid votes	9,856,196	98.88		
Invalid/blank votes	111,888	1.12		
Total votes	9,968,084	100.00		
Registered voters/turnout	12,408,678	80.33		
Source: Mackie & Rose, Voice Japan

=== By prefecture ===
Prefecture	Total seats	Seats won								
Prefecture	Total seats	RS	RM	JD	SDP	K	L-FP	JL-FP	Others	Ind.
Aichi	17	5	10							2
Akita	7	4	3							
Aomori	6	4	2							
Chiba	11	6	4	1						
Ehime	9	7	2							
Fukui	5	2	2	1						
Fukuoka	18	9	6		1				1	1
Fukushima	11	6	5							
Gifu	9	5	3	1						
Gunma	9	4	5							
Hiroshima	13	7	6							
Hokkaido	20	10	9							1
Hyōgo	19	8	7			1		1		2
Ibaraki	11	6	5							
Ishikawa	6	3	3							
Iwate	7	6	1							
Kagawa	6	3	3							
Kagoshima	12	2	9							1
Kanagawa	11	5	6							
Kōchi	6	2	4							
Kumamoto	10	5	5							
Kyoto	11	4	4			1	2			
Mie	9	4	3							2
Miyagi	8	2	5							1
Miyazaki	5	1	4							
Nagano	13	6	6							1
Nagasaki	9	3	6							
Nara	5	2	3							
Niigata	15	6	7			1				1
Ōita	7	4	3							
Okayama	10	7	2							1
Okinawa	5	3	2							
Osaka	21	5	13	1	2					
Saga	6	3	3							
Saitama	11	5	4							2
Shiga	5	3	2							
Shimane	6	1	4							1
Shizuoka	13	8	5							
Tochigi	9	4	5							
Tokushima	6	3	3							
Tokyo	31	14	16		1					
Tottori	4	2	2							
Toyama	6	2	4							
Wakayama	6	2	3							1
Yamagata	8	4	4							
Yamaguchi	9	7	2							
Yamanashi	5	3	1							1
Total	466	217	216	4	4	3	2	1	1	18

== Aftermath ==
The Manchurian warlord Zhang Zuolin was assassinated by the Japanese army in June 1928. Tanaka denounced the army for this, but lost support and was forced to resign in July 1929. Opposition leader Hamaguchi became Prime Minister and formed a new government.
