= Asanuma =

Asanuma (浅沼, "shallow swamp") is a Japanese surname. Notable people with the surname include:

- Hanjirō Asanuma (浅沼 半次郎; 1861–1951), village headman and dairy farmer; father of Inejiro Asanuma
- Inejiro Asanuma (浅沼 稲次郎; 1898–1960), Japanese politician and assassinated head of the Japan Socialist Party
- Kyoko Asanuma (浅沼 享子; 1904–1981), Japanese politician, widow of Inejiro Asanuma and Japan-China friendship advocate
- Michio Asanuma (浅沼 美智雄; 1915–2001), Japanese political activist, right-wing activist, member of the Greater Japan Patriotic Party
- Kanji Asanuma (浅沼 寛治; born 1934), Japanese former water polo player
- Santy Asanuma (born 1961), Palauan politician
- Shintarō Asanuma (浅沼 晋太郎; born 1976), Japanese voice actor
- Suguru Asanuma (浅沼 優瑠; born 1992), Japanese footballer
- Takuya Asanuma (浅沼 拓也; born 1971), Japanese musician
- Toshinori Asanuma (浅沼 寿紀; born 1989), Japanese baseball player
