= Hirosawa =

Hirosawa (Japanese: 広沢) is a Japanese surname. Notable people with the surname include:

- Ichirō Hirosawa (born 1963), Japanese politician
- Katsumi Hirosawa (born 1962), Japanese baseball player
- Kenichi Hirosawa (1919–2003), Japanese politician
