= Inejirō Asanuma =

Japanese socialist politician (1898–1960)

- 浅沼 稲次郎
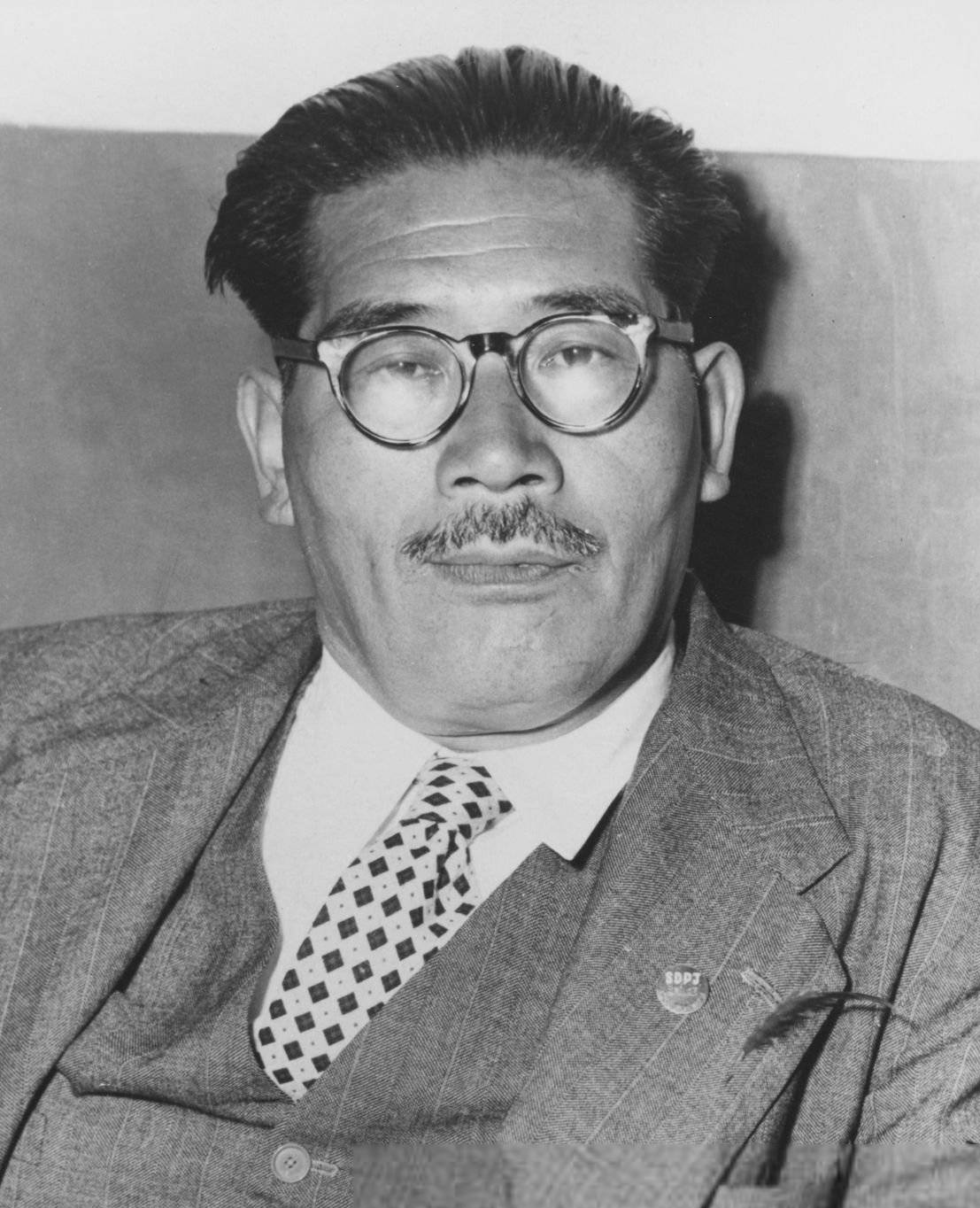
- Asanuma in 1952

Chairman of the Japan Socialist Party
- In office 23 March 1960 – 12 October 1960
- Preceded by: Suzuki Mosaburō
- Succeeded by: Saburo Eda (acting); Jōtarō Kawakami

Secretary General of the Japan Socialist Party
- In office 13 October 1955 – 23 March 1960
- Chairman: Mosaburō Suzuki
- Preceded by: Himself (Right); Hiroo Wada (Left)
- Succeeded by: Saburo Eda
- In office April 1950 – October 1951
- Chairman: Mosaburō Suzuki
- Preceded by: Mosaburō Suzuki
- Succeeded by: Himself (Right); Masaru Nomizo (Left)
- In office January 1948 – April 1949
- Chairman: Tetsu Katayama
- Preceded by: Suehiro Nishio
- Succeeded by: Mosaburō Suzuki

Member of the House of Representatives
- In office 11 April 1946 – 12 October 1960
- Preceded by: Constituency established
- Succeeded by: Kyōko Asanuma
- Constituency: Tokyo 1st (1946–1947); Tokyo 1st (1947–1960)
- In office 21 February 1936 – 30 April 1942
- Preceded by: Park Choon-Geum
- Succeeded by: Zenjuro Watanabe
- Constituency: Tokyo 4th (1936–1937); Tokyo 3rd (1937–1942)

Member of the Tokyo Metropolitan Assembly
- In office 13 September 1943 – 10 April 1946
- Constituency: Fukagawa Ward

Personal details
- Born: 27 December 1898 Miyake-jima, Tokyo, Japan
- Died: 12 October 1960 (aged 61) Chiyoda, Tokyo, Japan
- Cause of death: Assassination (stab wound)
- Resting place: Tama Cemetery, Tokyo
- Party: Socialist (1945–1951; 1955–1960)
- Other political affiliations: FLP (1925); JLFP (1926–1928); SMP (1932–1940); IRAA (1940–1942); Independent (1942–1945); RSP (1951–1955)
- Spouse: Kyōko Takeda (m. 1928)
- Children: Kinue Asanuma (adopted)
- Parents: Hanjirō Asanuma; Yoshi Asaoka
- Education: Waseda University

Inejiro Asanuma (浅沼 稲次郎, Asanuma Inejirō; 27 December 1898 – 12 October 1960) was a Japanese politician and chairman of the Japan Socialist Party from 23 March 1960 until his assassination the same year. Known for his large stature and powerful voice, he tirelessly toured the country delivering speeches, earning him the nicknames "speech-making everyman" (enzetsu hyakushō), "human locomotive" (ningen kikan-sha), and the affectionate "Numa-san".

In the prewar years, Asanuma was a forceful advocate of socialist policies and tenant and farmer rights. During World War II, Asanuma aligned himself with the Imperial Rule Assistance Association and supported Japan's war in Asia. In the postwar period, Asanuma resumed forceful advocacy of socialism and sharply criticized the U.S.–Japan alliance. During visits to China in 1957 and 1959, he publicly expressed deep remorse for Japan's wartime invasion and aggression against the Chinese people and declared that "American imperialism is the common enemy of the peoples of Japan and China". These positions made him a highly polarizing figure in Japan.

Despite his leftist politics, Asanuma was known for his personal reverence for the emperor, maintaining a kamidana in his modest apartment and performing daily rituals there. He lived simply in public housing for decades and was popular among working-class voters for his approachable "everyman" style.

In 1960, Asanuma was assassinated with a wakizashi, a traditional short sword, by 17-year-old far-right ultranationalist Otoya Yamaguchi while speaking in a televised political debate in Tokyo. His violent death was seen in graphic detail on national television by millions of Japanese, causing widespread public shock and outrage.

== Early life and education ==
Asanuma was born on 27 December 1898 in the village of Kamitsuki on the island of Miyake-jima, a remote volcanic island that is administratively part of Tokyo, as the illegitimate son of Hanjirō Asanuma (1861–1951), the village headman, and his concubine Yoshi Asaoka.

Asanuma's mother raised him on Miyake-jima until he was about 13 years old. In his memoir, Asanuma recounted a childhood incident from his time on Miyake-jima, when he was in the fifth or sixth grade of elementary school (around ages 10–12). On the way back from swimming with school friends, he was taunted with the challenge, "Can you cross that trough?" After his cousin Iguchi Tomoichi crossed first, Asanuma followed, not wanting to be outdone. Midway across the toi, a wooden water trough suspended over a deep valley roughly 60–90 meters high (several dozen jō) and spanning about 30 meters across, he squatted down as a playful show of bravado, picked up a small stone inside the trough, and dropped it into the valley below.

When his mother, who had been working in the fields, later heard about the reckless stunt, she scolded him so fiercely that "fire seemed to shoot from her eyes." Terrified, he fled outside and, upon returning home later, hid inside a straw sack. He described his mother as strict yet devoted, raising him carefully under challenging conditions.

His father, Hanjirō Asanuma, later remarried Inoue Hisa and moved to Sunamura (now part of Kōtō, Tokyo), where he became a dairy farmer. Upon this remarriage, Hanjirō officially recognized Inejirō as his son and brought him to live in Tokyo. He attended what was then Tokyo Prefectural Third Middle School (now Tokyo Metropolitan Ryōgoku High School), In his first school speech contest (delivered on the chemistry stairs), he failed badly and swore off public speaking. He was inspired later by lectures from politicians like Korehiro Kurahara.

Asanuma enrolled in a preparatory course at Waseda University in 1918. He rejected his father's wish that he become a doctor, leading to a temporary estrangement.

In his memoir, Asanuma recalled his father's strong reaction when he announced his plans after graduating from Tokyo Prefectural Third Middle School in 1916:

"In Taishō 5 [1916], after graduating from Prefectural Third Middle School, I told my father, 'I want to enter Waseda University and become a politician.' He scolded me severely. My father said, 'Politicians are the type who squander the family fortune and end up ruining the household—become a businessman, or go to Keio's medical school and become a doctor.'"

To support himself, he worked at a stationery company run by a friend, where he made fountain pens. During his university years, he belonged to the Oratorical Society and the sumo club (making use of his strong physique), and he also competed in races with the rowing club. He later recounted that the university's founder, Ōkuma Shigenobu, had praised his build.

Asanuma often reflected on Miyake-jima's long history as a place of exile for political dissidents and criminals such as the samurai Minamoto no Tametomo. In his memoirs, he listed specific exiles whose remnants he saw as a child, including prisons still visible in Igaya Valley, and noted cultural influences from figures such as the loyalist scholars Takeuchi Shikibu and Yamagata Daini, the painter Ei Itchō, and the kabuki actor Ikushima Shingorō. He jokingly referred to himself as a "descendant of exiles" and recounted that his father, as village headman, had learned Chinese classics such as Nihon Gaishi and Jūhasshi Ryaku from an exiled scholar. A local historian and friend, Etsutarō Asanuma, once told him that his vigorous fighting spirit in the Diet must come from having Tametomo's blood in his veins, to which Inejirō replied that being called a "modern-day Tametomo" felt a bit ticklish.

He also recounted his father's deep anguish over his son's leftist activities while serving as village headman. The tension increased during Inejirō's conscription examination the following year. A military policeman had traveled from Tokyo to monitor him. As village headman, Hanjirō was responsible for conducting the examination himself. Distressed by the surveillance and his son's leftist activities, Hanjirō considered resigning his post. Inejirō persuaded him not to, telling him that "there was no need for parents to bear responsibility for their child's ideas."

While still in college, Asanuma became involved in various forms of leftist activism. Among other activities, in 1919 he founded the "Builders League", which studied the works of English socialists, worked for Russian famine relief, and protested against military-related research being conducted at Waseda. Asanuma disliked delving into theory and was enthusiastic about tasks others avoided, such as posting flyers and selling publications.

During a protest rally against a student group cooperating with the military (the Waseda Military Research Group), he gave a speech and was physically assaulted by athletic club members and right-wing groups (Waseda University Military Research Group Incident). When the Great Kantō Earthquake struck, after attending a meeting in Gunma Prefecture, he tried to reach the Ashio Copper Mine but was arrested en route by soldiers. In Ichigaya Prison he provocatively demanded books from the guards, was beaten unconscious, handcuffed for a week, and forced to polish his own handcuffs as punishment.

== Political career ==
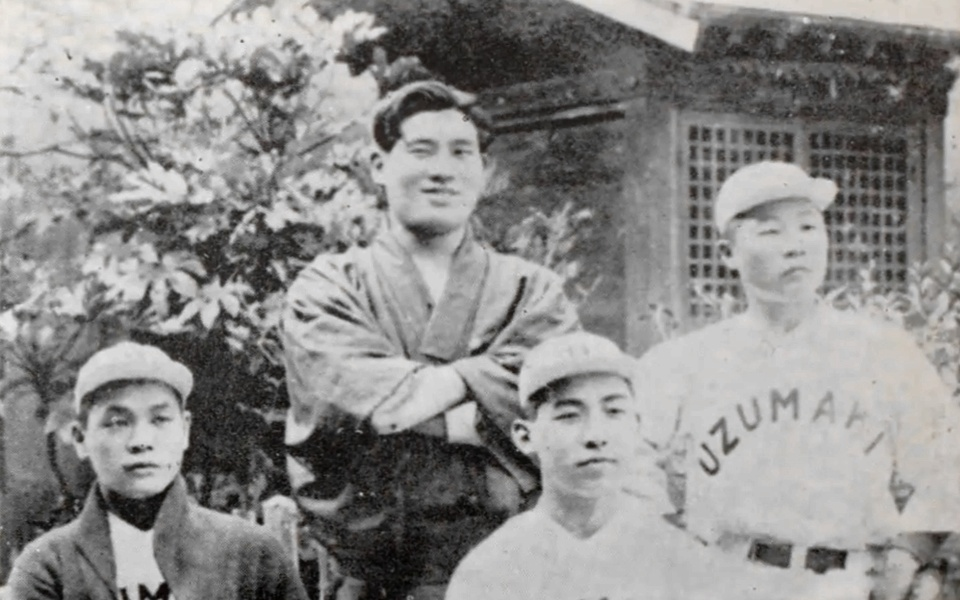
Asanuma (standing, in kimono) during his Waseda University years (before 1923)

Asanuma graduated from Waseda University's department of Political Economy in 1923. On 1 December 1925, at the age of 26, he was appointed secretary-general of Japan's first unified proletarian party, the Farmer-Labour Party, but the party was forcibly dissolved by the government just one hour after its formation, citing the authority of the recently passed Peace Preservation Law.

In 1926, Asanuma was one of the main founders of the similarly named Japan Labour-Farmer Party, as part of his efforts to link urban labor movements with rural peasant's movements. However, Asanuma left the party after it split into right, center, and left factions, and became involved in tenant organizing and the Labour-Farmer movement. In 1932, the fragmented proletarian parties were united to form the Social Masses Party, which Asanuma also joined.

=== Shift to National-Socialism and the war period ===
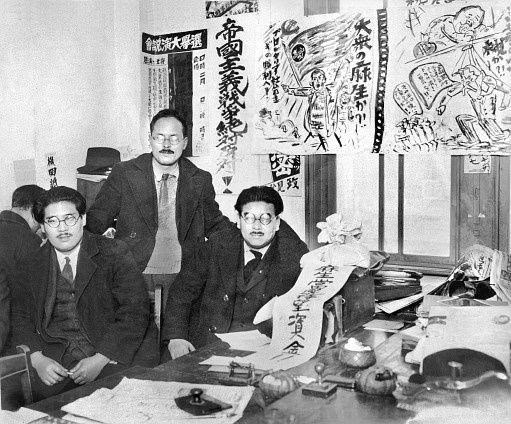
Asanuma and Asō in 1932

Deeply admiring secretary-general Hisashi Asō's character, he supported Asō's national-socialist line aiming for social reform through cooperation with the military. Thereafter, Asanuma took a position supporting the military's war policies. Representing the Social Masses Party, Asanuma was elected to the Tokyo City Council in 1933 and to the House of Representatives for the first time in the 1936 Japanese general election.

On 26 March 1937, during a meeting of the House of Representatives' Committee on the Air Defence Bill, Asanuma addressed the treatment and legal status of Koreans living in mainland Japan. He argued that Koreans residing in Japan, whom he estimated numbered approximately 700,000, should also be considered for compulsory military service, since they were subject to compulsory education and possessed certain political rights. He believed that extending military obligations to sufficiently assimilated Korean residents could contribute to Nissen yūwa (日鮮融和, Japanese–Korean harmony).

Asanuma also condemned the discrimination experienced by Korean residents, citing landlords' refusal to rent them housing, lower wages, and mistreatment of Korean children in Japanese schools. Referring to the anti-Korean violence following the 1923 Great Kantō Earthquake, he warned that the Japanese authorities needed to understand the circumstances and feelings of Korean residents. He argued that discrimination and exclusion could create serious problems in the future.

In 1938, when the Japanese Diet passed the State General Mobilization Law and other bills, Asanuma, representing the Social Mass Party, spoke in favor of them and served as a member of the National Mobilization Deliberation Council.

In 1939, Asanuma participated in a Japanese parliamentary delegation to the Inter-Parliamentary Union conference in Oslo, Norway (August 1939), traveling through the United States and Europe from June to October. During the voyage, he read extensively from Ikki Kita (including History of Chinese Revolution) and held frequent discussions with Reikichi Kita (younger brother of Ikki Kita, also a delegation member). He expressed strong admiration for Ikki Kita's passionate nationalism and for Shūmei Ōkawa. After finishing Ōkawa's History of Japan's 2,600 Years, he noted that its passionate advocacy of renewal and patriotic fervor "feels as though it is permeating my own body." These readings reinforced his vision of a new East Asian order.

On 30 September 1939 he wrote that whether called the East Asian League theory, the New Order in East Asia, or the East Asian Cooperative Body, it was "a new Sonnō Jōi [Revere the Emperor, Expel the Barbarians] theory" and "by no means so-called imperialism," but rather "the establishment of a new Eastern spirit and a new order upon the foundation of Nationalism and Nationalism." He observed that some Japanese viewed Europe's war as "a heaven-sent blessing for Japan," yet insisted Japan must prepare for what came next by cultivating "autonomous and independent strength" and that "ethnic totalitarianism" should evolve into "supra-ethnic regionalism." Regarding China, he stated that Chiang Kai-shek "has not awakened to this Eastern spirit," while Wang Jingwei "has awakened to it and is cooperating with our country with an anti-communist spirit in order to revive the spirit of the Chinese revolution." He also remarked that Japanese politicians needed far better knowledge of foreign political conditions, since Japan's politics could no longer be discussed apart from world trends, while still stressing that Japan possessed superior qualities that must be fully utilized.

During the voyage, Asanuma also recorded conversations with foreign passengers concerning Soviet Russia, the Bolsheviks, Stalin, and the Russian Revolution. He explicitly introduced these passages as accounts of things he had "heard from foreigners" aboard the Gripsholm, rather than as his own political judgments. Among the material he recorded were accounts of repression under the Bolsheviks, as well as antisemitic claims concerning Jewish involvement in revolutionary violence and Soviet politics. He also recorded an argument that Russia had "already turned back from communism" and had become more national and ethnic in character.

While in Europe, Asanuma observed wartime preparations in Nazi Germany and the outbreak of World War II, including Germany's invasion of Poland on 1 September 1939, which he learned of in Berlin. His diary records an appreciative impression of Hitler's oratory, describing his powerful voice and the thunderous applause accompanying his radio speech, and also contains notes on Hitler's Mein Kampf and aspects of Nazi political organization. However, his writings focused primarily on the implications of the European conflict for Japan and East Asia: he viewed the war pragmatically as an opportunity to strengthen Japan's independence and advance an Asian regional order, rather than explicitly endorsing Nazi ideology as a whole.

In February 1940, when Takao Saitō delivered an anti-military speech criticizing the quagmire of the Second Sino-Japanese War, Asanuma voted in favor of his expulsion.

On 14 March 1940, during a meeting of the House of Representatives' Committee on Petitions, Asanuma advocated the establishment of a comprehensive national land-use plan to coordinate population distribution, industrial development, transportation and resource management. He argued that these measures were necessary to strengthen Japan's national defence and productive capacity. In his speech, he envisioned Japan's population working as part of an integrated Japan–Manchuria–China framework (Nichi-Man-Shi ittai), contributing to the construction of East Asia.

In September 1940, Asanuma published an article, Eikoku o Tōyō kara Tsuihō seyo (Expel Britain from the Orient), in which he praised the Japanese Army's military achievements in China, the establishment of the Wang Jingwei government, and the construction of a "New Order in East Asia." He called for Japan to remove foreign powers obstructing this order from Asia and advance toward the establishment of the Greater East Asia Co-Prosperity Sphere. In the same article, he described the United States as an even greater obstacle to the construction of the New Order in East Asia than Britain.

Upon the launch of the Imperial Rule Assistance Association in October 1940, Asanuma was appointed deputy head of its temporary election system research department. However, the organization later adopted a state capitalist economic line that differed markedly from his own socialist views. Combined with the sudden death of Asō that same year, which deprived him of his spiritual pillar and caused him deep anguish, these developments led Asanuma to decline to run in the 1942 wing-election. This decision later exempted him from postwar public office purges. In 1942, he instead ran for Tokyo City Council but lost due to interference by authorities. Following the establishment of the Tokyo metropolitan system, he ran in the first Tokyo Metropolitan Assembly election in 1943, won a seat, and was appointed vice-chairman. During this period, he also served as chairman of the Kiyosuna neighborhood association in Fukagawa, where he became involved in local affairs and community efforts. During the March 1945 Tokyo air raids, Asanuma survived in his Dōjunkai apartment by removing flammable items and covering windows with wet straw mats to protect against shattering glass and fire. He later recalled the experience with lingering fear, saying it still made his hair stand on end. According to a contemporary Asahi Graph profile, while many residents evacuated after the devastating 10 March air raid, Asanuma remained in the neighborhood and helped lead efforts to rebuild the apartment community. He listened to the Gyokuon-hōsō (Jewel Voice Broadcast announcing Japan's surrender) in his apartment in Fukagawa.

=== Japan Socialist Party era ===
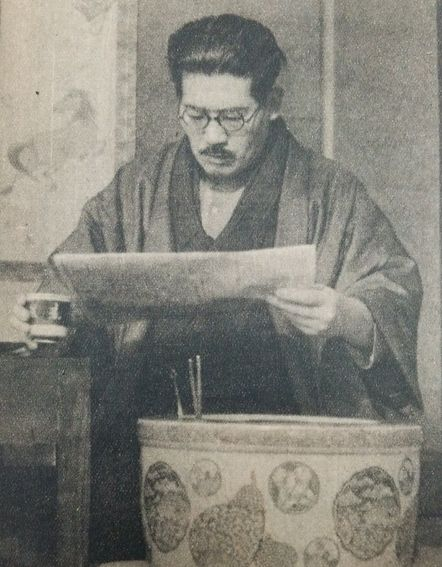
Asanuma in 1948

In the immediate aftermath of Japan's defeat in World War II, Asanuma was one of the founders of the Japan Socialist Party (JSP). Upon its formation in 1945, he became organization director. With centrist leaders such as Jōtarō Kawakami and Jusō Miwa purged from public office, Asanuma naturally emerged as the central figure of the centrist faction.

At the founding convention of the Japan Socialist Party on 2 November 1945, Asanuma, then serving as the party's Organization Minister, opened the proceedings by declaring, "Now, let us perform remote worship toward the Imperial Palace", and called on the audience to stand and bow. More than half of the participants stood and bowed with him, although some jeered in protest. Together with Toyohiko Kagawa and others he then led three cheers of "Tennō Heika Banzai!"

In 1947, when secretary-general Suehiro Nishio joined the Katayama cabinet, Asanuma became deputy secretary-general, and the following year he was formally appointed secretary-general (and became the first chairman of the House of Representatives Steering Committee). In the 1949 general election, party chairman Tetsu Katayama was defeated, and in the special Diet session for prime ministerial designation, the JSP voted for Asanuma (though Shigeru Yoshida was actually designated). He temporarily stepped down as secretary-general but returned to the post in 1950.

In early 1950, as part of a Japanese Diet members' inspection tour of the United States, Asanuma visited state legislatures and the U.S. Congress. The delegation was received on the floors of several state assemblies and met senior figures including Vice President Alben Barkley. Upon returning, the group submitted reform proposals on Japanese Diet operations (25 April 1950). Asanuma later reflected on the contrast between American material abundance and Japan's postwar hardship, as well as the differing attitudes among Americans toward Japan after the war.

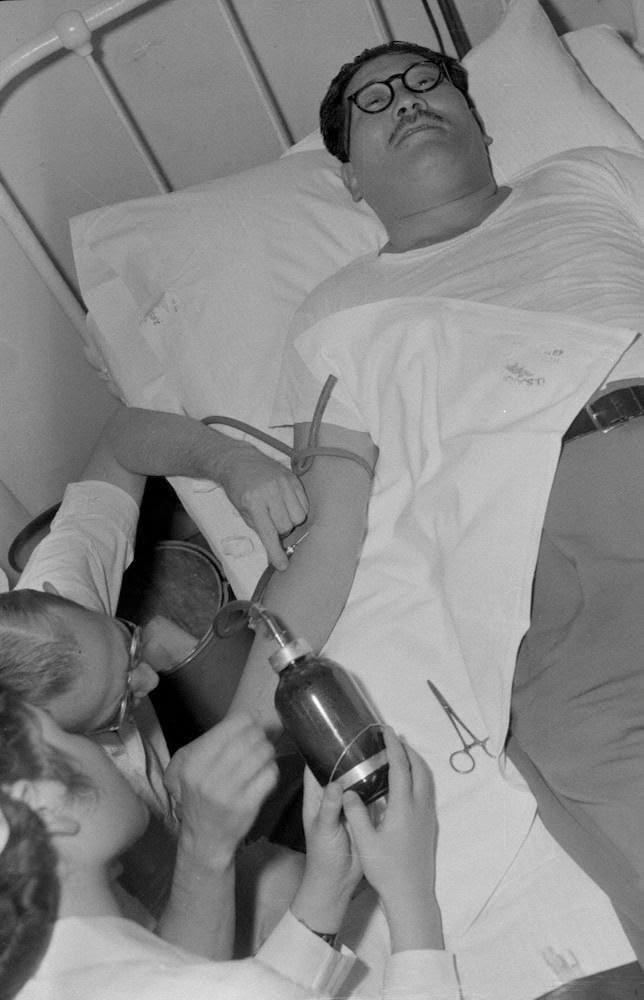
Asanuma donating blood in Tokyo to support wounded UN soldiers, 28 September 1950

That same year, during the early stages of the Korean War, he took part in a public blood donation campaign in Tokyo to support wounded UN soldiers. On 28 September 1950, Asanuma along with other prominent figures such as Chief Cabinet Secretary Katsuo Okazaki donated blood for the UN forces engaged in the conflict. Contemporary accounts, including NHK archival footage, describe the initiative as a response to casualties among UN troops following operations such as the Inchon landing and the crossing of the Nakdong River.

In January 1951, while Inejirō was being re-appointed secretary-general at a Japan Socialist Party congress held in Waseda University Lecture Hall, he was privately informed of his father's death. He chose not to announce it publicly at the congress, fearing it would be seen as a bad omen for the party. The next day he chaired the funeral of fellow socialist Minekubo Manryō before traveling to Miyake-jima for his father's funeral. Reflecting later, he wrote:

"In January of the 25th year [Shōwa 25 = 1950], at the party congress in Waseda University Lecture Hall, my father's death was announced to me. This was the congress where I was re-appointed as secretary-general, and announcing my father's death at that congress—while I don't necessarily believe in omens—seemed bad for the party, so I kept it secret. The next day there was the party funeral of the late Minekubo Manryō, and since I was serving as funeral committee chairman, I finished the funeral and only then headed to Miyake-jima. There was no regular ferry service at the time, so I returned to Miyake-jima on a small boat of about 100 tons, but in my haste I left my morning coat behind in a taxi along the way. Was this divine punishment for defying my father to become a politician, or for failing even to be at his deathbed? Such failures happened too."

The memoir dates these events to Shōwa 25 (1950), but this is considered a memory error or misrecording. Minekubo Manryō died on 16 January 1951 (Shōwa 26) from a cerebral hemorrhage, and the related party congress and funeral are historically documented as occurring in January 1951.

That same year, amid internal conflict over the San Francisco Peace Treaty and U.S.–Japan Security Treaty, the left faction opposed both while the right faction supported them. Asanuma proposed a compromise-supporting the peace treaty but opposing the security treaty—in an attempt to reconcile the factions, but he could not prevent the left–right split. As secretary-general of the right-wing JSP, he traveled nationwide tirelessly to support comrades, earning the nickname "human locomotive" for his vitality.

On 14 March 1953, Asanuma as secretary-general of the Right Socialist Party, delivered a speech in the House of Representatives supporting a joint no-confidence motion against the Fourth Yoshida Cabinet. He argued that the cabinet had failed to give the newly independent nation a sense of purpose and instead pursued American-follower diplomacy and "reverse course" policies that were driving progressive citizens into despair, allowing fascist-reactionary politics to rise while simultaneously giving the Communist Party room to "rampage," thereby opening the path to both left-wing and right-wing totalitarianism and placing the nation and democracy in crisis; that the Security Treaty and Administrative Agreement left Japan incompletely independent (including the lack of Japanese jurisdiction over U.S. personnel, unresolved territorial issues involving South Sakhalin, the Kuril Islands, Habomai and Shikotan under Soviet occupation, and the continued U.S. administration of Okinawa, Amami and the Ogasawara Islands); that democratization was being rolled back through changes to the police, education, labor regulations, the Anti-Monopoly Law and agricultural policy; that economic policy kept wages and farm prices low while imposing heavy taxes on small businesses and relying on special procurements; and that the cabinet was disregarding the Constitution, particularly Article 9, by pursuing what he characterized as de facto rearmament while showing contempt for the Diet.

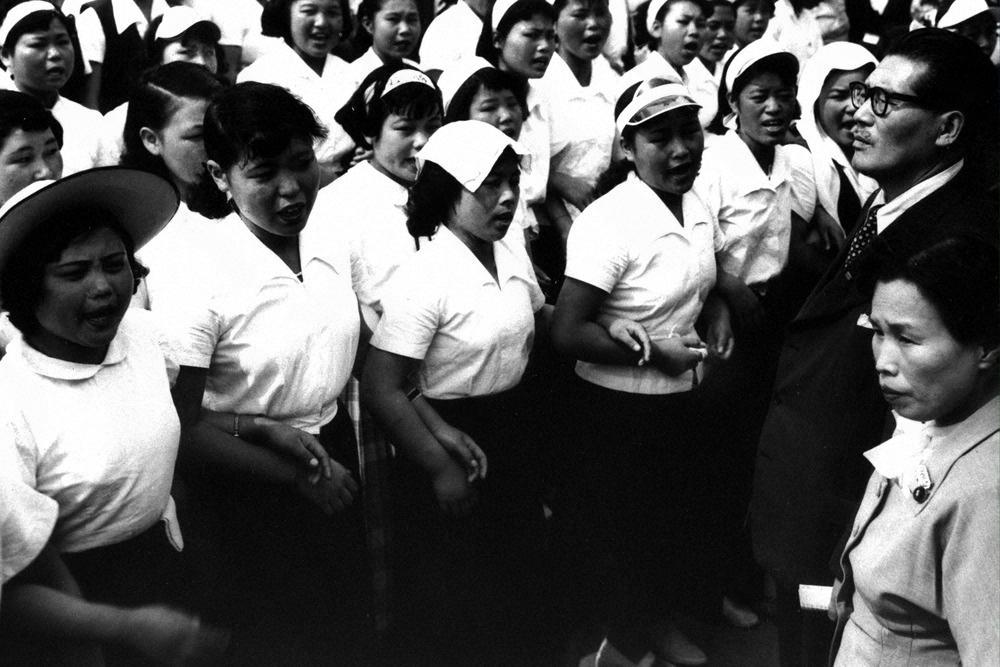
Asanuma and Tsutsumi Tsuruyo encourages new members of the Omi Silk Strike, 18 June 1954

In June 1954, Asanuma spoke in support of the Ōmi Kenshi Struggle (also known as the Omi Silk human-rights dispute). He encouraged new union members at the Hikone plant on 18 June and gave a support speech at a demonstration in Fujinomiya on 28 June. The major labor conflict involved predominantly young women workers demanding an end to restrictive company practices such as forced dormitory living and interference with personal freedoms.

On 13 October 1955, following the reunification of the Socialist Party, Asanuma became secretary-general. Due to his role as secretary-general, when internal conflicts arose, he often acted as a mediator, pacifying both sides with "maa maa" (calm down), earning him the nickname "Maa-maa Koji" (まあまあ居士; roughly the "Maa-maa Lay Practitioner"). In his own words: "People often call me 'Maa-Maa Koji' or say I am indecisive, timid, passive, etc. But in a mass organization, once a policy is decided at a congress, if everyone abides by it, there will be neither conflict nor split." His long tenure as secretary-general without ascending to chairman also led to the nickname "perpetual secretary-general" (万年書記長; Mannen Shokichō, lit. "ten-thousand-year secretary-general").

In August 1955, Asanuma visited Sunagawa to support local residents opposing the planned expansion of the U.S. Air Force's Tachikawa Air Base. He subsequently supported the Sunagawa Struggle, which became a major anti-base movement involving local residents, labor unions, students, and Socialist Party politicians.

When Tanzan Ishibashi resigned as prime minister in February 1957 on grounds of illness and "political conscience," Asanuma publicly praised the decision, remarking that this was how a politician should behave.

In late 1958, Asanuma participated in a suprapartisan initiative supporting the repatriation of Zainichi Koreans from Japan to North Korea. This took place at a time when Zainichi Koreans faced legal uncertainty, discrimination, and economic hardship following Japan's colonial rule of Korea and the division of the Korean Peninsula during the Cold War. On 17 November 1958, the "Association for Cooperation on the Repatriation of Korean Residents in Japan" (在日朝鮮人帰国協力会) was formally launched, bringing together figures from across Japan's political spectrum, with Asanuma, former conservative Prime Minister Ichirō Hatoyama, and Japan Communist Party leader Kenji Miyamoto, among its prominent supporters. At the time, North Korea promoted itself as willing to accept returnees and the group framed the effort as a humanitarian issue respecting individuals' right to return to their homeland, though knowledge of conditions in North Korea was limited. The group's activities contributed to the Japanese government's approval of the program, with repatriation beginning in 1959.

==== Views on the Emperor System ====
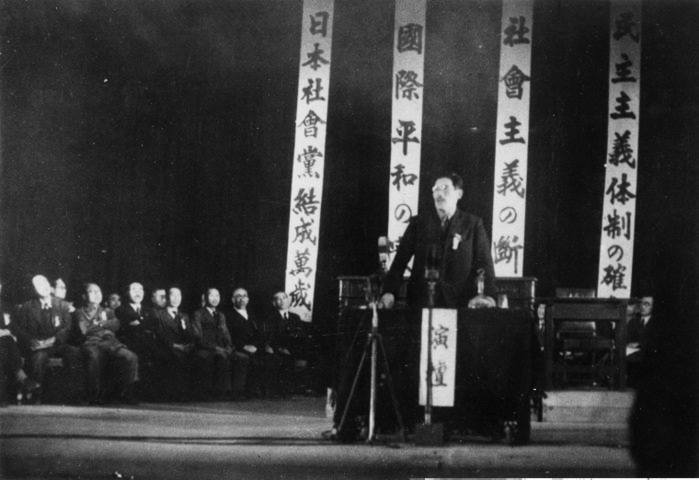
Asanuma addresses the founding convention of the JSP, 2 November 1945

Despite his socialist politics and sharp criticism of Western imperialism, Asanuma was known for his deep respect for emperor Hirohito and the imperial family. He maintained a household Shinto altar (kamidana) in his apartment living room and performed a daily clapping reverence toward it as a gesture of devotion. In addition to private rituals, scholar Umezawa Shohei notes that Asanuma performed yōhai (remote worship/bowing from a distance) toward the imperial palace every morning. This practice stood in contrast to the Japanese Communist Party's calls to "overthrow the emperor system", which Asanuma disliked and actively rejected despite his socialist affiliations.

At the time of the Japan Socialist Party's founding in 1945, Asanuma advocated maintaining the national polity (kokutai) under a democratized emperor system. At the party's founding convention on 2 November 1945, Asanuma, then serving as the party's Organization Minister, opened the proceedings by declaring, "Now, let us perform remote worship toward the Imperial Palace", and called on the audience to stand and bow. More than half of the participants stood and bowed with him, although some jeered in protest. Together with Toyohiko Kagawa and others, he then led three cheers of "Tennō Heika Banzai!"

As a right-wing Socialist Party secretary-general, Asanuma stated that the issue of the emperor's abdication should be decided by the emperor himself, demonstrating deference to imperial autonomy on sensitive postwar matters. Asanuma's respect for the emperor aligned with some right-leaning socialists' views, seeing the imperial institution as a symbol of national unity and ethnic harmony rather than oppression (unlike foreign monarchies). They also underscored the continuity in Asanuma's thought: a consistent opposition to external domination of Asia alongside an attachment to Japan's traditional national character. He viewed the emperor system as non-exploitative and capable of fostering social equilibrium, reflecting a "natural national sentiment" beyond ideological theory. This contributed to his divergence from radical communist anti-imperialism.

Asanuma once violently reprimanded a journalist who had made mocking remarks about the emperor during an informal conversation. This episode has been cited as evidence of his understanding of Japan's national polity and his "patriot" qualities within socialism.

=== Visits to China ===
==== 1957 visit ====
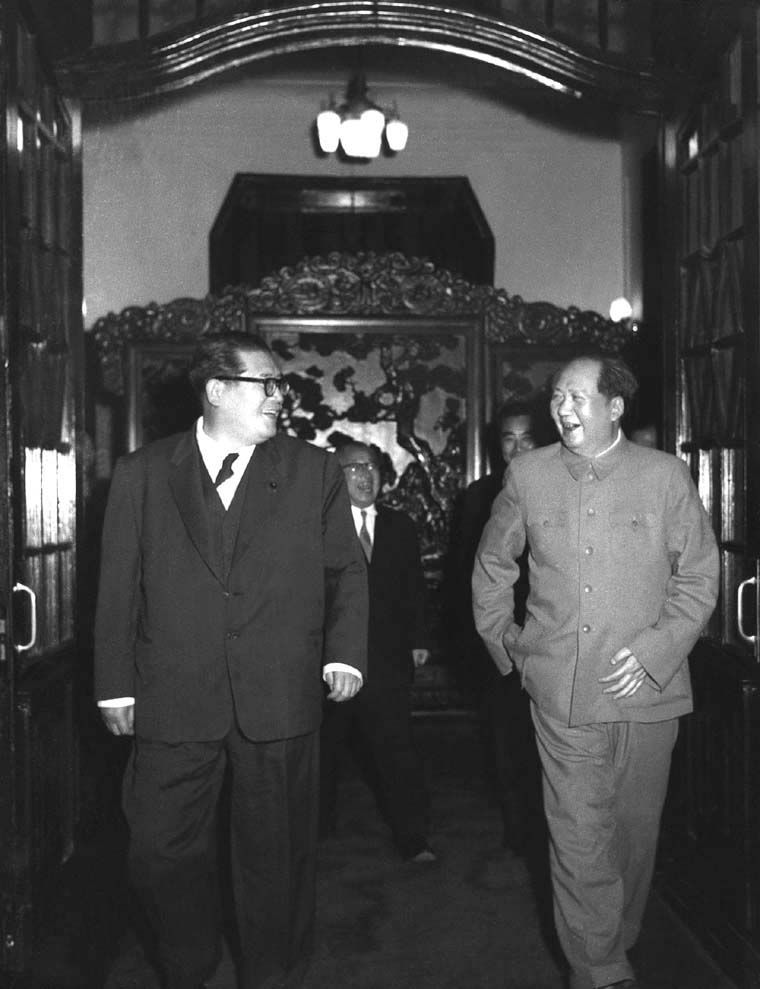
Asanuma and Mao Zedong in 1957

In April 1957, Asanuma led the Japan Socialist Party's First Goodwill Mission to China as its head delegate.

Upon arrival, he publicly expressed deep remorse for Japan's invasion of China, stating that the delegation felt profound reflection for failing to prevent the war of aggression that had inflicted great suffering on the Chinese people.

The delegation, which included Seiichi Katsumata, Tadao Satō, Ryōsaku Sasaki, Masaru Sone, Shichirō Hozumi, Hideo Yamahana, and Tomomi Narita, met with Chairman Mao Zedong and Premier Zhou Enlai, among other Chinese officials.

On 22 April 1957, a joint communiqué was issued with the Chinese People's Institute of Foreign Affairs. It emphasized the promotion of diplomatic normalization between Japan and the People's Republic of China, rejection of the "two Chinas" concept, peaceful resolution of issues related to Taiwan, support for China's representation in the United Nations, and broader cooperation in economic, cultural, and people-to-people exchanges.

The visit aligned with the JSP's policy of sending goodwill delegations to major powers (including the United States and the Soviet Union) to advance its principle of unarmed neutrality.

After returning to Japan, Asanuma published a book titled The Path to Japan-China Cooperation (日中提携への道) in May 1957, summarizing the visit, his discussions with Chinese leaders, the joint communiqué, and his views on strengthening Japan–China relations.

This trip laid groundwork for subsequent JSP–China exchanges, including Asanuma's second visit in 1959.

==== 1959 visit ====
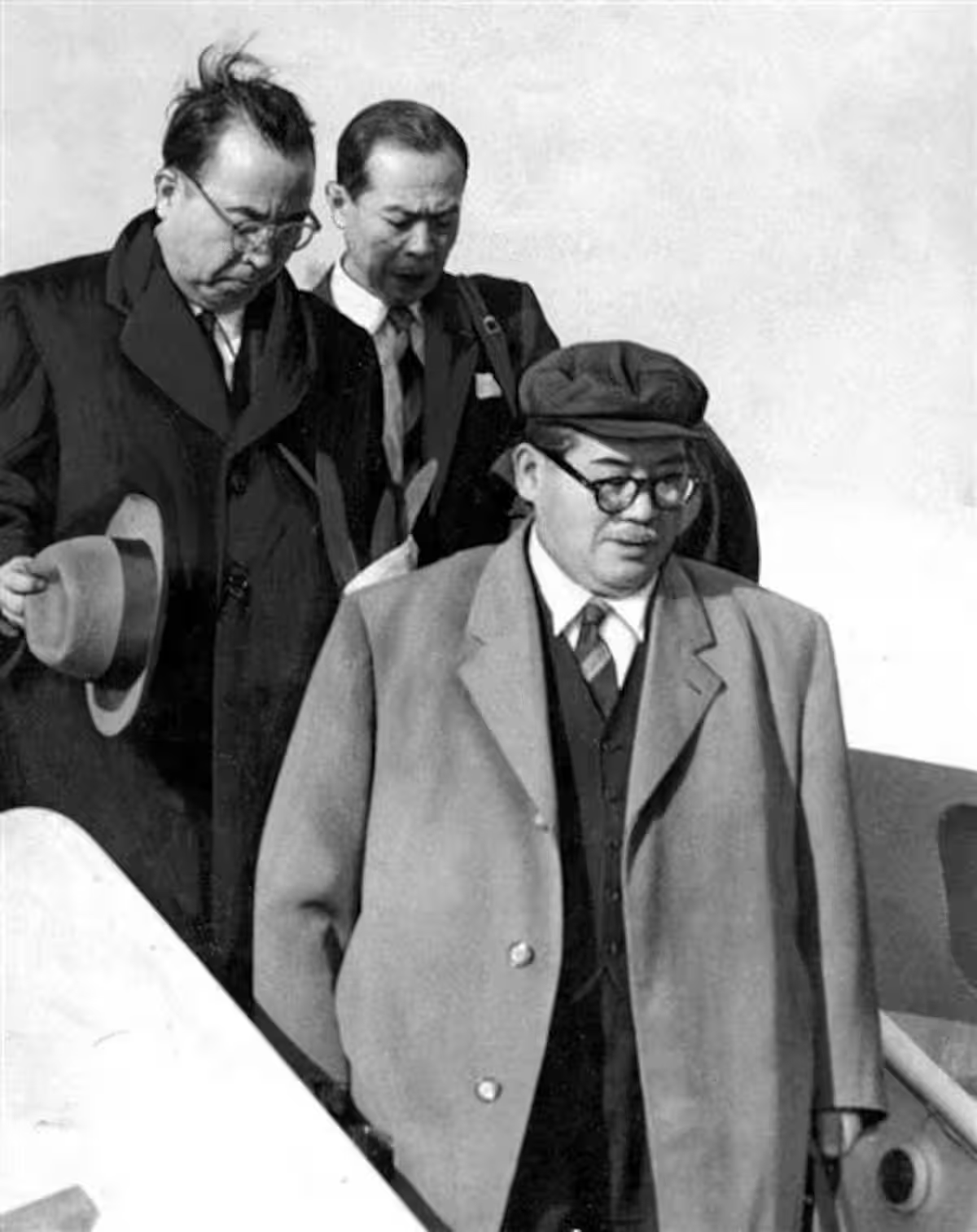
Asanuma returning from China, wearing a Chinese worker's cap, 25 March 1959

In March 1959, as leader of the second JSP delegation to China, Asanuma endorsed the PRC's "One China" policy and declared "American imperialism is the common enemy of the peoples of Japan and China". In the speech (delivered 12 March 1959 at the Chinese People's Political Consultative Conference auditorium), he stated that Taiwan was part of China and Okinawa part of Japan, and argued that their separation from their respective mainlands resulted from American imperialism. He linked U.S. military bases in Japan, Okinawa, and Taiwan to the danger of nuclear weapons and argued that the Japanese and Chinese peoples shared the task of achieving nuclear disarmament in Asia and removing foreign military bases. He called for Japan to end its military relationship with the United States and argued that the military provisions concerning Japan in the Sino-Soviet Treaty of Friendship, Alliance and Mutual Assistance would likewise become unnecessary once Japan achieved independence and neutrality. He advocated a comprehensive Asian peace and security system involving Japan, China, the Soviet Union, and the United States.

In the same speech Asanuma closed with a philosophical reflection that he linked directly to socialism:

"I believe that the true nature of humanity is not one of conflict between people, nor of class against class, nor of nations fighting and shedding blood. I believe the true nature of humanity lies in resolving these problems as quickly as possible and mobilizing all our strength to struggle against great Nature. This struggle cannot be carried out without the practice of socialism. China has now resolved all its contradictions and is concentrating its struggle on great Nature. Here we can see what the advance of a socialist state looks like. I earnestly wish for victory in this struggle."

He then declared that the Socialist Party intended to fight capitalism and imperialism in Japan, overcome their contradictions, resolve Japan's domestic contradictions, and ultimately mobilize all its strength in the struggle with Nature "for the happiness of humanity." He concluded by proclaiming: "Long live the socialism of advancing China! Long live the restoration of diplomatic relations between China and Japan! Long live peace in Asia and the world!"

The speech draft was prepared by the left-wing Kenichi Hirosawa, whom Asanuma called "gokusa" (extreme left). The explicit naming of "American imperialism" as the "enemy" caused a major stir domestically and internationally. The Liberal Democratic Party's Takeo Fukuda immediately sent a protest telegram, successfully framing it as "Asanuma's gaffe". The image of Asanuma disembarking at Haneda Airport wearing a Chinese worker's cap (rather than a full Mao suit, as sometimes mischaracterized in popular retellings) drew criticism from the right wing, public opinion, and even within the party. Right-wing delegate Sone Eki and others stated they could not agree with the secretary-general's attitude. Left-wing chairman Mosaburō Suzuki reportedly scolded Hirosawa, saying "What on earth were you doing as Asanuma's secretary?"

Despite the strong backlash from conservatives and right-wing groups, Asanuma refused suggestions from those around him to accept a bodyguard. He replied, "I am a socialist. It is not necessary," and expressed firm confidence that "the masses believe in me" and "no one would try to kill me."

According to a 22 September 2015 Sankei Shimbun online article, shortly after returning, Asanuma was questioned by U.S. Ambassador Douglas MacArthur II and backed off his comments after being shouted down while attempting to explain. However, according to an interview by Akihisa Hara with Seiichi Katsumata, Asanuma refused to retract his statement, leading to a prolonged argument and cancellation of the planned meeting. According to the official JSP account "Maishin: The Struggle of Inejirō Asanuma", when Asanuma visited the U.S. Embassy on 24 May 1960 after the forced vote on the Security Treaty, MacArthur strongly demanded retraction, but Asanuma refused, stating "There is no need to retract. This is not an attack on the American people; fighting imperialist policy is natural for the Socialist Party."

Scholars suggest Asanuma's statement reflected repentance for damage caused to Chinese people by Japan's participation in aggression since the Mukden Incident. Additionally, Hwang Bang-su (黄方秀), a North Korean who was visiting China at the time, had previously lived in Japan and assisted with Asanuma's election campaigns; he urged Asanuma and others to take a more combative stance to break the deadlock. Reportedly, Hirosawa prepared milder alternatives like "issue" instead of "enemy", but Asanuma deliberately chose "enemy". However, Seiichi Katsumata claimed the phrase "American imperialism is the common enemy of the peoples of Japan and China" originated with Chinese leader Zhang Xiruo, and Asanuma merely agreed, saying, "Well, yes..."

During the same visit, Asanuma climbed the Great Wall at Badaling. Impressed by Mao Zedong's famous line "He who has never been to the Great Wall is not a true man", the 60-year-old Asanuma (around 175 cm tall and weighing nearly 100 kg) insisted on taking the steeper left-side path, jokingly saying that as a "leftist" he should naturally go left. He soon became drenched in sweat, removed his leather shoes and socks, and continued barefoot to the top. Descending was even harder due to his size and momentum; a Chinese journalist had to grab his belt from behind to prevent him from slipping. The next day, during a meeting with Mao Zedong in Zhongnanhai, Mao humorously remarked that although the Great Wall is high, Asanuma had successfully climbed it after taking off his shoes. Asanuma was surprised that Mao already knew the details of his climb and laughed heartily with the others present.

=== Chairman of the JSP ===
In 1960, when Suehiro Nishio and others left the JSP to form the Democratic Socialist Party, chairman Mosaburō Suzuki resigned and Asanuma was elected his successor. In his role as JSP chairman, Asanuma became one of the leading figures in the 1960 Anpo protests against the US-Japan Security Treaty. On 24 May 1960, he visited the U.S. Embassy to request postponement of President Dwight D. Eisenhower's planned visit to Japan and engaged in a heated debate with the ambassador over "American imperialism". On 24 May 1960, he visited the U.S. Embassy to request postponement of President Dwight D. Eisenhower's planned visit to Japan and engaged in a heated debate with Ambassador Douglas MacArthur II over the 1959 "American imperialism is the common enemy" statement. A contemporary account in the 6 June 1960 issue of Time magazine reported that MacArthur demanded Asanuma retract the statement; Asanuma replied "Not the American people, American imperialism!" and MacArthur later stated publicly that Asanuma "was unable to make any clear distinction." In the face of massive, nationwide popular protests, Prime Minister Nobusuke Kishi was forced to resign and Eisenhower's visit was cancelled, although the Security Treaty was not scrapped.

In July 1960, shortly after the end of the Anpo protests, Prime Minister Nobusuke Kishi was stabbed six times in the left thigh by right-wing activist Taisuke Aramaki at the Prime Minister's Official Residence, sustaining serious but non-fatal injuries. Despite their intense political rivalry, Asanuma personally visited Kishi to offer condolences and inquire about his condition.

As a politician, Asanuma cultivated an "everyman" image. He lived modestly in public housing his entire life, and was particularly popular among ordinary laborers, small shopkeepers, and other members of the working class.

In contrast to his pro-war stance during World War II, in the postwar period, Asanuma spearheaded the JSP's staunch opposition to revising Article 9 of Japan's postwar constitution and remilitarizing Japan. However, historian Andrew Gordon argues that Asanuma was consistent in his antipathy to western imperialism and a desire for Asia to chart its own course in world affairs.

According to former Mainichi Shimbun reporter Michio Ozaki, who, as a young Waseda University student and member of the Waseda Political Studies Society, visited the Diet Members' Hall to pay annual dues for a supporting membership during the height of the 1960 Anpo protests, Asanuma displayed a warm and approachable personality, laughing off rumors while shaking with laughter in his large frame. Asanuma casually remarked to the student about rumors that Zengakuren might set the building ablaze, laughing heartily as he noted that other Diet members had vanished. He added, "The next election will be in Shinjuku, so please support me."

On 4 September 1960, just over a month before his assassination, Asanuma visited the Rinzai Zen temple Kinryū-ji in Azumino City, Nagano Prefecture. He delivered a public lecture there as part of his tireless grassroots speaking schedule. During the event, he performed calligraphy of the classic Zen phrase Nichinichi kore kōnichi (Every day is a good day), a well-known saying attributed to the Chinese Zen master Yunmen that emphasizes mindfulness, gratitude, and finding value in ordinary daily life. Following Asanuma's death, local residents who had attended the lecture erected a stone monument on the temple grounds reproducing his calligraphy as a memorial.

== Assassination ==
Pulitzer Prize–winning photograph by Yasushi Nagao. The photo was taken directly after Yamaguchi stabbed Asanuma and is here seen attempting a second stab, although he was restrained before that could happen.

On 12 October 1960, Asanuma was assassinated by 17-year-old Otoya Yamaguchi, a right-wing ultranationalist, during a televised political debate ahead of upcoming elections for the House of Representatives. The event was a three-party leaders' debate (Liberal Democratic Party, Japan Socialist Party, and Democratic Socialist Party) held at Tokyo's Hibiya Public Hall with an audience of about 2,500. Right-wing hecklers in the audience loudly disrupted Asanuma's speech with shouts and distributed leaflets accusing the JSP of being "lackeys of China and the Soviet Union." While Asanuma spoke from the lectern, he was criticizing the Ikeda cabinet’s income-doubling plan (which he argued would be undermined by rising prices and trade liberalization that threatened mass unemployment), the long-term unnatural presence of U.S. bases, and the need for complete Japanese independence and a neutral security framework involving Japan, the United States, the Soviet Union, and China. In the course of the speech he also referred positively to figures within the Liberal Democratic Party such as former Prime Minister Tanzan Ishibashi and Kenzo Matsumura, noting that they possessed common sense and sound judgment. He began the sentence: "During the election, they keep policies that would be unpopular with the public a secret, and then once they have won a majority in the election, they will... " ("選挙の際は、国民に評判の悪い政策は、全部伏せておいて、選挙で多数を占むると..."). At approximately 3:05 p.m, Yamaguchi rushed onstage and ran his yoroi-dōshi, a traditional samurai short sword, through Asanuma's ribs on the left side. The first deep thrust severed the aorta anterior to the spine; a shallower stab also struck the left chest. Because of Asanuma's large build, subcutaneous fat initially plugged the external wound, resulting in little visible external bleeding, secretaries and bystanders at first thought the injury was not serious. He staggered a few steps before collapsing and was rushed to nearby Hibiya Hospital, where he was pronounced dead at around 3:40 p.m. from massive internal hemorrhagic shock. Japanese public broadcaster NHK was videorecording the debate for later transmission and the tape of Asanuma's assassination was shown many times to millions of viewers. The photograph of Asanuma's assassination won its photographer Yasushi Nagao both the Pulitzer Prize and World Press Photo of the Year.

While watching the tape-delayed broadcast at home (preempted earlier by coverage of the Japan Series baseball championships), Kyōko Asanuma saw a breaking news scroll announcing that her husband had been stabbed. She immediately prepared a change of clothes for him and rushed by taxi first to Hibiya Public Hall and then to the hospital, where she learned he had died.

Michio Ozaki recalled seeing a large banner near the Waseda University's literature department on the evening of Asanuma's death. It proclaimed "Inejirō Asanuma Has Been Assassinated!", leaving him stunned. He later recalled the televised footage showing the 17-year-old attacker delivering a sharp full-body thrust, after which Asanuma collapsed forward, rounding his back and falling with a thud onto the floor of Hibiya Public Hall. Ozaki and other students later visited Asanuma's modest rented apartment in Kōtō Ward to pay respects. A worker-like man greeted them with the words "Students, thanks for your trouble" and guided them inside, where Asanuma's wife and son-in-law Norikuni Nakano (then working at Fuji TV) bowed deeply to the visiting mourners in front of the body.

Yamaguchi was captured at the scene of the crime, and a few weeks afterwards committed suicide by hanging himself while in police custody.

Following Asanuma's assassination, protest rallies and demonstrations condemning the outrage were held nationwide, with an estimated 445,000 participants in the rallies and 370,000 in the demonstrations.

== Commemoration ==
Asanuma's assassination shocked Japan's political establishment. Shortly after his death, conservative prime minister and erstwhile electoral rival Hayato Ikeda captured the mood of his fellow lawmakers when he gave a heartfelt eulogy for Asanuma on the floor of the Diet. Commemorating Asanuma as a "speech-making everyman" (演説百姓, enzetsu hyakushō), Ikeda declared:

You made service to the people the core of your political principles. Literally running from east to west, you were constantly appealing directly to the people with unrivaled eloquence and unmatched passion.

'Numa truly is a speech-making everyman
With his soiled clothes and tattered briefcase;
Today in this public hall,
Tomorrow at a roadside temple in Kyoto.

This is what Asanuma's comrades used to sing about him back in the 1920s, when they were founding the Japan Labour-Farmer Party. Even after he became Chairman [of the JSP], this "speech-making everyman" spirit never showed the least sign of flagging. Even now, we all still have vivid recollections of you giving all those speeches in every corner of this nation.

According to reportage at the time, Ikeda's short speech was met with thunderous applause and left many lawmakers in tears.

Asanuma's body was cremated on 14 October 1960, with Shinto-style elements incorporated.

On 17 October, an imperial envoy visited Asanuma's home in Kōtō Ward's Shirakawa Town to deliver a sacrificial offering (saishiryō) from Emperor Hirohito.

On 18 October, the Emperor publicly appealed for public order and obedience to the law. In a speech opening a special session of the National Diet, he urged the Japanese people to "esteem the principle of obeying the laws" and to "shun violence", remarks widely understood as alluding to the killing of Asanuma and the unrest that followed. Contemporary observers described the address as the emperor's closest approach to intervening in a matter of grave national political concern since his renunciation of divinity in 1946.

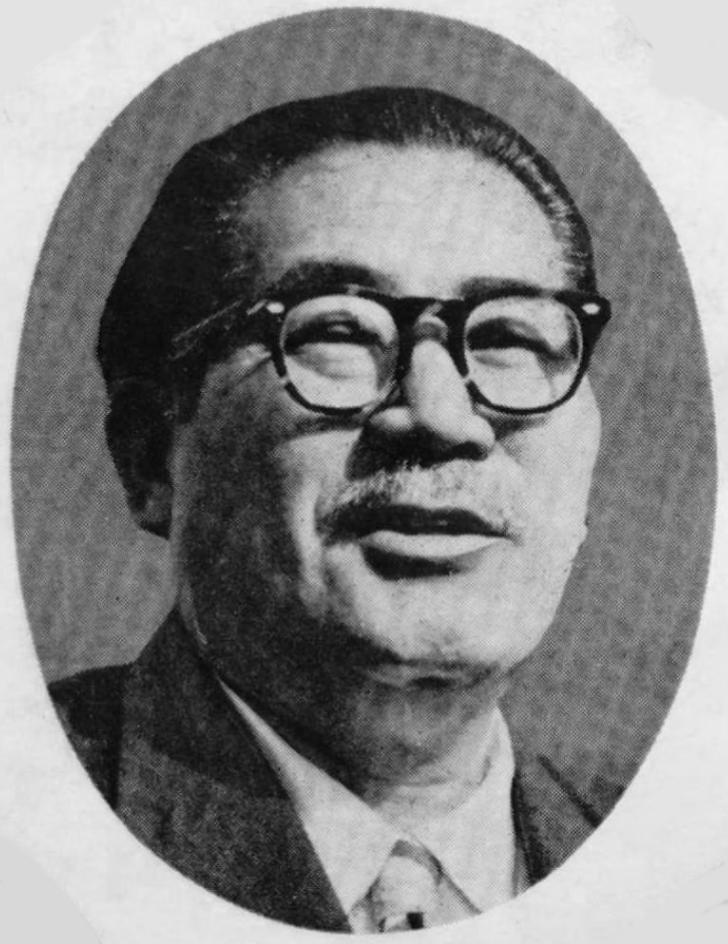
"Twenty Years of the Japanese Socialist Party" (November 1965)

Asanuma's funeral was held on 20 October, at the same Hibiya Public Hall where he was assassinated. Despite cold rain, about 2,600 people attended the service. The Japan Socialist Party designated 12 October each year as 'Asanuma Memorial Day', with commemorative events held annually.

Otoya Yamaguchi's mother continued to visit Asanuma's grave on the anniversary of his death.

Many members of the press were captivated by Asanuma, and every year on the anniversary of his death, journalists connected to him would gather to mourn his passing. In his lifetime, newspaper reporters would say, "When there's no political gossip material available, just look for Asanuma," and he would calmly accommodate even unreasonable requests such as "Please take a bath five times a day."

The site of his birthplace in Kamitsuki (Godake), Miyake Village, Miyakejima, was turned into a public park (commonly called the Children's Park), where a statue of Asanuma with his right arm raised in his signature speaking pose was erected. However, following the eruption of Mount Oyama in 2000, toxic volcanic gases caused discoloration of the upper part of the statue. The park itself became overgrown with weeds and poorly maintained for many years.

The preserved wooden birthplace house, which had stood in the park, deteriorated significantly over time and was not designated as formal cultural heritage. During renovation and repair work on the park, the house was demolished (reports indicate it was already removed by mid-to-late 2025, with a new management building under construction in its place). A large old tree nearby was reportedly left standing. The statue of Asanuma remains in the park as a local memorial.

The Social Democratic Party had a bust of Asanuma in its headquarters, but when the party moved from the Social Cultural Hall to a private building in January 2013, the bust (weighing 2 tons) could not be moved without risking structural damage to the building. The base was cut down and some materials replaced to reduce the weight to 470 kg, and the relocation was completed in May 2013.

Asanuma's clothing worn at the time of the assassination, along with other personal relics and daily items, are preserved in the collection of the National Diet's Constitutional Memorial Hall and have been displayed in permanent and special exhibitions as part of its historical materials on modern Japanese politics.

Since 2007, the Asanuma Inejirō Memorial Gathering Executive Committee (浅沼稲次郎追悼集会実行委員会) has organized annual symposia, relic exhibitions, and events around 12 October, often inviting cross-party politicians.

== Personal life and personality ==
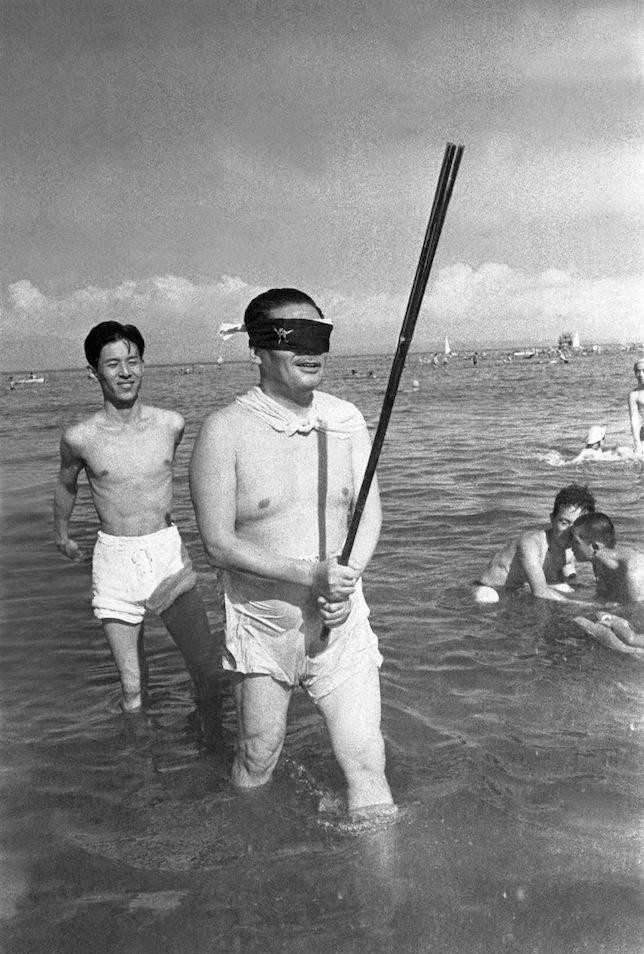
Asanuma at the beach, 15 August 1954

Asanuma lived for about 30 years in a Dōjunkai apartment in Shirakawa, Kōtō Ward, Tokyo, having moved there as a victim of the 1923 Great Kantō Earthquake. These early reinforced concrete public housing complexes were a symbol of post-disaster reconstruction and featured modern amenities such as gas, running water, and flush toilets. When at home, he liked to tend plants in a tiny garden in the corner of the residence, barely larger than a "cat's forehead."

In a 1953 essay written while serving as secretary-general of the Right Socialist Party, Asanuma reflected that the time for a silver wedding anniversary was approaching, yet the family still lived in the same narrow Fukagawa Shirakawa apartment that doubled as an office; decades of dedicating himself to the socialist movement and the masses had required sacrificing family life, and although his wife had endured it well, he constantly wondered when they might finally have a day of rest while continuing to devote himself to the work.

Before entering Waseda University, Asanuma failed entrance exams to military schools several times: twice for the Army Cadet School, twice for the Army Academy, and four times for the Naval Academy.

As a Waseda University student around 1921, when a typhoon flooded the rowing club's boathouse, Asanuma rushed to the scene and tried to save the boats, placing himself in the front line.

The meeting with his future wife, Kyōko (née Takeda Kyōko, 享子), dates back to the end of the Taishō era, during the transition to the Shōwa era. Kyōko had a brief prior marriage in her teens that ended in divorce due to the feudal attitudes of her in-laws; she moved to Tokyo, worked in a café while attending dressmaking school, and met Asanuma when socialists frequented the café as a gathering spot. The couple married in autumn 1928. They had no biological children but adopted a daughter, Kinue Asanuma, a distant relative's child.

Asanuma was known both as a henpecked husband and a deeply devoted spouse. In his 1959 essay "Apartment Living for Thirty Years," Asanuma quoted his wife Kyōko's frequent sarcastic remark about their apartment constantly being filled with political visitors and comrades: "Is this apartment a railway station?" (このアパートは停車場ですか). The comment playfully referenced his famous "human locomotive" nickname. Asanuma admitted that he sometimes felt sorry about the situation while continuing his tireless activities "as the human locomotive called by many comrades."

Asanuma was regarded not only as a devoted husband but also as a feminist who deeply respected women. He would often ask reporters "Where is Kaa-chan…?" using an affectionate term for his wife Kyōko if she was not present during their visits to the apartment, he would sometimes even open the closet door, looking for her. He frequently presented the reporters with small gifts, such as dried fish from his birthplace on Miyake-jima or seasonal fruits, wrapped in newspaper, to give to their wives. Asanuma and Kyōko had hoped to one day supplement their apartment life by becoming 'Sunday farmers' to get closer to nature. According to a contemporary Asahi Graph profile, Asanuma also hoped to spend his retirement quietly tending bonsai or going fishing, but these ambitions were cut short by his assassination in 1960. After Asanuma's assassination, Kyōko entered politics as a "proxy" candidate. In the November 1960 general election (just weeks after his death), she ran in Tokyo's 1st district for the JSP, campaigning on opposition to violence. She won a seat (finishing 2nd) and served one term in the House of Representatives (1960–1963) before retiring. She continued Japan–China friendship activities in later years.

Asanuma was also known as a great dog lover. He participated as a voice actor in the 1956 Japanese radio drama adaptation of Disney's Lady and the Tramp, voicing the tough bulldog character Bull. The radio drama was produced as part of the ''Kanegafuchi Spinning / Disney Hour'' (カネボウ・ディズニー・アワー) program on Radio Tokyo. It consisted of 9 episodes and aired every Tuesday from 18:25 to 18:55, from 7 August to 2 October 1956, to coincide with the theatrical release of the Disney animated film in Japan. Recording took place on 6 September 1956 at Radio Tokyo's Hall recording studio in Yurakuchō. Disney's technical director, Jack Cutting, personally chose Asanuma after hearing his powerful, booming voice during a live National Diet radio broadcast. Cutting declared the voice perfect for the bulldog role, citing Asanuma's nickname "Human Locomotive". Nagai Rokusuke, a member of the comedy writing group "Jōdan Kōbō" (冗談工房), was tasked with negotiating. Cutting offered to pay "any amount" and requested 10 full days of Asanuma's time for the film dubbing. Asanuma, then the Japan Socialist Party secretary-general and a busy sitting Diet member, initially declined, saying he could not commit to such a long schedule, but he promised, "Next time the opportunity comes, I'll do it." When the radio drama (which required far less time) was later proposed, Asanuma honored his verbal agreement and accepted immediately. He performed enthusiastically, greatly delighting Cutting. The casting was widely regarded as extremely unusual because an active high-profile politician was making his voice-acting debut in a Disney production.

Contemporary photographs and text from Asahi Graph (アサヒグラフ), 30 October 1960, issue No. 1896 ("浅沼委員長凶刃に倒る"). The page shows Inejirō Asanuma relaxing at home in his modest Dōjunkai apartment (wearing a kimono), his grieving Akita dog Jirō, and his death mask. The Japanese text columns provide anecdotes about his lifestyle and the dog's grief.

After his previous dog, Tarō, died of old age, political rivals Kenji Fukunaga (Liberal Democratic Party) and Ikkō Kasuga (Democratic Socialist Party) offered him an Akita puppy to comfort him. Asanuma named the new puppy Jirō. According to a report in the 30 October 1960 issue of Asahi Graph, he was delighted with the name and happily associated it with the famous Sakhalin sled dogs Tarō and Jirō from the Antarctic expedition. Asanuma initially wanted to keep the puppy indoors, but Kyōko made him keep it outside in the small garden area of their Dōjunkai apartment. A complaint letter arrived criticizing the situation "What kind of thing is it for a politician to keep a fierce guard dog at the entrance as a watchdog?" which bothered Asanuma. Because the couple had no biological children and their adopted daughter Kinue was already a university student at the time, the beloved dog Jirō became an especially precious and irreplaceable companion to Asanuma. Although Asanuma hoped to spend more time with Jirō, his preparations for the 1960 general election left him little time to do so. Nonetheless, his deep affection for his pets was well-known; in his eulogy, Prime Minister Hayato Ikeda highlighted this approachable, everyman lifestyle, noting that Asanuma "would take his beloved dog for walks in the neighborhood, and this was one of his daily pleasures."

After Asanuma's assassination, Jirō became subdued and remained near the entrance of the apartment while mourners came to pay their respects. According to Asahi Graph, he quietly watched the visitors and occasionally whimpered. The magazine's 30 October 1960 issue included a photograph of the dejected dog lying outside the apartment during the mourning period. Jirō later stopped eating and died shortly afterward, reportedly of grief, "as if following his master".

Asanuma enjoyed hosting baniku (horse-meat) parties at home, where he would enthusiastically eat surrounded by guests. His predecessor as JSP chairman, Jōtarō Kawakami, recalled being invited and noted how happily Asanuma ate. In his Dōjunkai apartment, he was often seen in a yukata on the small balcony, smiling down at neighborhood children watching kamishibai (paper theater) performances.

Asanuma demonstrated strong mediation skills beyond his own party. Although positioned on the right wing of the Socialist Party and despite his dislike of the Japanese Communist Party, he actively worked for cooperation between socialists and communists. He enjoyed the trust of JCP members and supporters and helped maintain good relations between the two parties.

Asanuma was known among journalists for his straightforward honesty and inability to lie. According to contemporary accounts, he held a strong belief against deceiving the public, and when faced with difficult questions, he would become flustered, fidgeting with documents or shrinking his large frame.

According to accounts attributed to the writer Momoi Shiroku, Asanuma was sensitive by temperament despite his imposing appearance and was hospitalized twice after suffering nervous illness. The first hospitalization reportedly followed the dissolution of the Social Masses Party and his participation in the Imperial Rule Assistance Association, which, according to the account, developed into an organization serving the military contrary to what Asanuma had envisioned, causing him considerable distress. The second occurred after the postwar split of the Socialist Party into left and right factions. His condition was reportedly severe, with some considering him unable to recover; the same accounts state that, while bedridden, he repeatedly dreamed of being mistreated by police while in detention.

His popularity in Tokyo's downtown working-class neighborhoods was particularly high. An oral tradition reports that a journalist who spoke negatively about him in a cafeteria frequented by local workers was immediately thrown out.

In keeping with his imposing stature, his appetite was exceptionally renowned. According to Shigezō Hayasaka, then a journalist at the Tokyo Times, during an electoral tour, twice as many katsudon bowls as journalists were prepared. When a reporter asked: "Numa-san, are a lot of other people coming?", Asanuma, already in his sixties, replied: "What? Is one enough for you guys?", before devouring two bowls of katsudon without hesitation, accompanied by miso soup and pickled vegetables.

Asanuma (right) pays tribute to Rikidōzan at the opening of the Pro Wrestling Center Dojo, 2 October 1959

Passionate about combat sports, Asanuma was vice-captain of the sumo club during his years at Waseda University. He maintained close ties with the professional sumo world, actively supporting the wrestler Ōuchiyama Heikichi, and became in 1957 a member of the newly established Operations Deliberation Committee of the Japan Sumo Association. Through this, he befriended Rikidōzan, the father of Japanese professional wrestling. Notably, he was also a blood relative of Yoshio Shirai, Japan's first professional boxing world champion, and acted as a witness at Shirai's wedding.

Despite the strong political opposition he faced from the right, Asanuma maintained a personal relationship with the prominent right-wing ultranationalist and political fixer Yoshio Kodama. Kodama was a major postwar "kuromaku" (behind-the-scenes power broker) active in both politics and the underworld from the 1930s to the 1970s. In a dialogue with writer Shūsaku Endō published in his 1975 book Ware Kaku Tatakaeri (われかく戦えり), Kodama stated that he opposed the assassination and had been on good terms with Asanuma: "I am opposed to it. Asanuma and I were on good terms. We often drank together. Asanuma personally was a fine person. That's why I said, 'Why did they do such a foolish thing? With this, they have eliminated the forum for dialogue between the Liberal Democratic Party and the Socialist Party.' Shortly afterwards, the Chūō Kōron incident occurred. At that time, I wrote in a newspaper, 'You mustn't do things like this. This is not the true form of the national movement,' and someone scolded me for it." According to the same account, Kodama is said to have provided money and information to Asanuma; both men were listed as patrons of Rikidōzan; and Asanuma allegedly used materials supplied by Kodama during the 1958 First FX fighter-aircraft selection controversy to criticize links between Grumman and Nobusuke Kishi.

Although his assassin, Otoya Yamaguchi, was influenced by the doctrine of the religious movement Seichō no Ie, particularly through founder Masaharu Taniguchi's writings such as Tennō Zettai-ron to Sono Eikyō (Absolute Theory of the Emperor and Its Influence), which Yamaguchi credited in his interrogation records with helping him overcome personal hesitation and embrace selfless loyalty to commit the act; Asanuma himself supported the founder of this movement. Taniguchi affirmed that Seichō no Ie was neither opposed to the Socialist Party nor aligned with the Liberal Democratic Party.

Bin Akao had known Asanuma personally since their time on Miyakejima. According to Sawaki Kōtarō's Teroru no Kessan, the two men would exchange greetings when they passed each other on the street. Akao once described Asanuma as "a good person, which makes it regrettable to deal with him" (善人だから始末に悪い), a comment some sources suggest influenced Yamaguchi's motives alongside Asanuma's statement labeling American imperialism as the common enemy of Japan and China (as recorded in Yamaguchi's "Memorial of Severing the Traitor"). After the assassination, Akao telephoned Asanuma's wife Kyōko and Mutsuko Miki to express condolences or discuss the matter.

Asanuma's cousin Yukika Asanuma (浅沼雪香, later Seno Yukika; born March 1911 on Hachijō-jima) was a Japanese Communist Party member and labour activist. She began working as a Tokyo City Electric Bureau bus conductor in April 1927 and became involved in union activities. She joined the Japanese Communist Party on 15 July 1928. On 16 April 1929, while attempting to deliver relief funds to comrades, she was arrested by Special Higher Police (Tokkō) officers and taken to Honfuji Police Station. During her 29-day detention she was subjected to sexual torture (a form of abuse later termed erotero), which left her permanently deaf in her left ear. She was released only after signing a false statement denying that any torture had occurred. She immediately resumed political activity and was arrested a further 18 times over the following 16 years; she continued her activism after the war.

Michio Asanuma, who served as a member of the Suginami Ward Assembly before becoming a participant (advisor) in the Greater Japan Patriotic Party, was a distant relative of Inejiro Asanuma. In a 1990 appearance on the Fuji Television documentary program NONFIX episode "Heisei Right Wing Standing at the Turning Point" (as supreme advisor of the Greater Japan Patriotic Party), he spoke positively and with admiration about the character and actions of Otoya Yamaguchi, the assassin of his distant relative.

== Legacy ==
In June 1961, the Japan Socialist Party's Asanuma Memorial Publication Editorial Committee published the 359-page tribute collection Bōshin: Ningen Kikan-sha Numa-san no Kiroku (驀進―人間機関車ヌマさんの記録; "Dashing Forward: Records of the Human Locomotive 'Numa-san'"), compiling personal recollections from associates that vividly portray Asanuma as a grassroots politician.

The Japan Socialist Party had been a union between left socialists, centrist socialists, and right socialists, who had been forced together in order to oppose the consolidation of conservative parties into the Liberal Democratic Party in 1955.

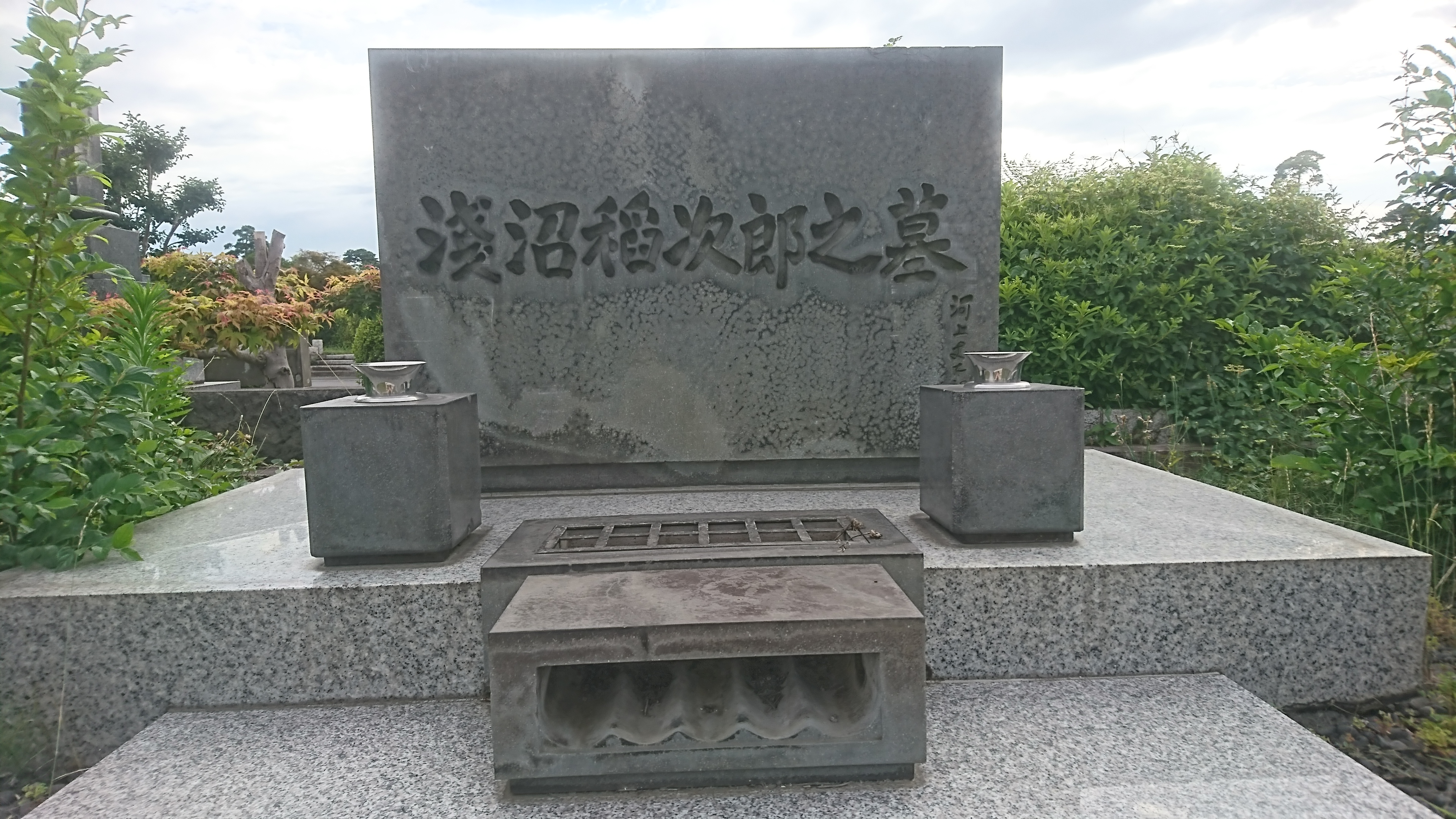
Asanuma's grave

Asanuma had been able to hold many of these mutually antagonistic factions together, and under Asanuma's charismatic leadership, the party had won an increasing amount of seats in the Diet in every election over the latter half of the 1950s and seemed to be gathering momentum.

Asanuma's death deprived the party of his leadership, and thrust Saburō Eda into the leadership role instead. A centrist, Eda rapidly took the party in a more centrist direction, far faster than the left socialists were ready to accept. This led to growing infighting within the party, and damaged its ability to present a cohesive message to the public. Over the rest of the 1960s and going forward, the number of seats the Socialists held in the Diet continued to decline until the party's extinction in 1996.

Internationally, Asanuma's outspoken criticism of U.S. imperialism and his support for closer ties with China earned him recognition in the socialist camp. On 13 October 1960, the day after the assassination, Chinese Premier Zhou Enlai sent a condolence telegram describing Asanuma as "an outstanding Japanese patriot and a friend respected by the Chinese people" and affirming that his unfinished cause would be realized with the victory of the Japanese people's struggle. In 1961, Cuba named a textile spinning mill in Gibara the Inejiro Asanuma Spinning Mill in his honor, a gesture reflecting solidarity with his anti-imperialist stance and martyrdom. Che Guevara, then serving as a key figure in the Cuban revolutionary government, was associated with this period of industrial development and internationalist gestures. In China, Mao Zedong paid tribute after the assassination by stating that Asanuma had "grasped the essence of the problem, grasped the essence of Japan–U.S. relations, and also grasped the fundamental problems of the peoples of China, Japan, Asia, Africa, Latin America, as well as Europe, North America, Canada, and the whole world." Mao added that he had previously told Asanuma that support for such views might sometimes be fewer or more numerous, but would eventually win the approval of the majority.

Tomiichi Murayama, a junior colleague of Inejirō Asanuma (later Chairman of the Japan Socialist Party and Prime Minister), always held Asanuma in deep respect as a "great figure." He regarded his political philosophy "Always be with the masses and learn from the masses" as a lesson learned from Asanuma's way of life. He stated that his decision to "bury his bones in the Socialist Party" came from his encounter with Asanuma. Murayama repeatedly said, "I can never forget that Asanuma was stabbed to death by a right-wing youth," and "Protecting Article 9 of the Constitution, that is what it means for Asanuma to still be alive."

== Works ==
=== Solo-authored ===
- Asanuma, Inejirō (20 December 1953). わが言論斗争録 日本の完全独立と平和のために [A Record of My Struggles in Speech: For the Complete Independence and Peace of Japan] (in Japanese). Shakai Shichōsha. ndldm:2977047.
- Asanuma, Inejirō (May 1957). 日中提携への道 [The Path to Japan–China Cooperation]. Alps Series (in Japanese). Vol. 28. Shōkō Zaimu Kenkyūkai.
- Asanuma, Inejirō (August 1998). 浅沼稲次郎 私の履歴書ほか [Inejirō Asanuma: My Résumé and Other Writings]. Ningen no kiroku (in Japanese). Vol. 72. Nihon Tosho Center. ISBN 978-4-8205-4317-6.

=== Edited ===
- Asanuma, Inejirō, ed. (July 1935). 東京市政の危機と牛塚市長の責任 附・昭和十年度予算市会活動報告 [The Crisis in Tokyo Municipal Government and the Responsibility of Mayor Ushizuka, with Appendix: Report on City Assembly Activities Regarding the 1935 Fiscal Year Budget] (in Japanese). Shakai Shinbunsha. ndldm:1455384.
- Asanuma, Inejirō, ed. (November 1954). 故冨吉栄二・菊川忠雄両君党葬追悼録 [Memorial Record of the Party Funeral for the Late Eiji Tomiyoshi and Tadao Kikukawa] (in Japanese). Japan Socialist Party Headquarters.
- Asanuma, Inejirō, ed. (December 1956). 故三輪寿壮君党葬追悼録 [Memorial Record of the Party Funeral for the Late Jusō Miwa] (in Japanese). Japan Socialist Party Headquarters.
- Asanuma, Inejirō, ed. (April 1958). 故山川均氏党葬追悼録 [Memorial Record of the Party Funeral for the Late Hitoshi Yamakawa] (in Japanese). Japan Socialist Party Headquarters.
- Asanuma, Inejirō, ed. (September 1958). 故松岡駒吉君党葬追悼録 [Memorial Record of the Party Funeral for the Late Komakichi Matsuoka] (in Japanese). Japan Socialist Party Headquarters.

=== Co-authored ===
- Tadokoro, Teruaki; Asanuma, Inejirō (August 1930). 労農青年に訴ふ [An Appeal to Labor and Farmer Youth] (in Japanese). Nōmin Rōdōsha.
- Asanuma, Inejirō; Kiire, Toratarō (July 1939). 国家総動員と労働統制 [National General Mobilization and Labor Control]. Jikyoku kōza (in Japanese). Vol. 1. Seidan-sha.
- Asanuma, Inejirō; Miyake, Shōichi (August 1952). 独立の完成と政治の一新の為に [For the Completion of Independence and the Renewal of Politics] (in Japanese). Japan Socialist Party Headquarters.
- Asanuma, Inejirō (March 1953). Japan Socialist Party Election Campaign Committee (ed.). 民主々義擁護吉田内閣打倒演説集 [Collection of Speeches in Defense of Democracy and for the Overthrow of the Yoshida Cabinet]. Kokkai tōsō series (in Japanese). Vol. 4. Tadao Kikukawa, Yoshio Suzuki, Shichirō Matsumoto, Rikizō Hirano, Toshiko Matsuo. Japan Socialist Party Headquarters.

=== Catalogue ===
- 浅沼稲次郎関係文書目録（稿） [Catalogue of Documents Related to Inejirō Asanuma (Draft)] (in Japanese). National Diet Library. August 1971.

== See also ==
- Assassination of Inejirō Asanuma
- Hibiya Public Hall
- Kinryu-ji Temple (Azumino) - There is a stone monument inscribed with the words "Every day is a good day," which were written by Asanuma
- Anpo protests
- Japan Socialist Party
- Right Socialist Party of Japan
- Yoshikata Asō
- Hisashi Asō
- Shakai Taishūtō
- Kyōko Asanuma
- All-Japan Farmers' Union (1927–1928)
- Farmer-Labour Party
- Waseda University Military Research Group Incident
- Builders League

Party political offices
| Preceded by Mosaburō Suzuki | Chairman of the Japan Socialist Party; 1960 | Succeeded by Jōtarō Kawakami; Saburo Eda (acting) |
| Preceded by N/A | General Secretary of the Japan Socialist Party; 1955–1960 | Succeeded by Saburo Eda |
| Preceded by New post | General Secretary of the Farmer-Labour Party; 1925 | Succeeded by Party banned |
