= Kinryū-ji (Azumino) =

Zen Buddhist temple

Coordinates: 36.2629°N 137.9118°E

Kinryū-ji (金龍寺)

Religion
- Affiliation: Zen Buddhism
- Sect: Rinzai
- District: Azumino City
- Prefecture: Nagano
- Ecclesiastical or organisational status: Active
- Status: Active temple

Location
- Country: Japan
- Interactive map of Kinryū-ji (金龍寺)
- Prefecture: Nagano

Architecture
- Established: 1878 (reestablished)

Kinryū-ji (金龍寺) is a temple of the Myōshin-ji branch of the Rinzai sect of Zen Buddhism, located in Azumino City, Nagano Prefecture, Japan. Its mountain name is Jōgosan (乗護山). The temple is notable for its historical significance, connection to the local Mamabe clan, and as a site for the production and sale of Daruma dolls.

== Overview ==
Although the temple is said to have origins dating back to the Kamakura period, the present-day Kinryū-ji was reestablished in 1878 with permission from the Ministry of Home Affairs. It was officially registered as a religious corporation on November 25, 1952.

The temple grounds are located on the site of the second enclosure of the Mamabe clan residence, a branch family of the Nishina clan, a powerful local family that ruled much of Azumi District during the Sengoku period. Apart from the slightly elevated terrain and remnants of moats, little remains to evoke its former appearance.

Near the main gate and approach, many stone monuments remain. Particularly well known are the numerous stone statues of Kannon, said to have been created in 1842, collectively known as the "Hundred Kannon Statues".

At the temple, Daruma dolls are produced. A Daruma Market is held every year in early January, and Daruma dolls are sold year-round. For this reason, the temple is also known as a "Daruma Temple".

== Monument of Inejirō Asanuma ==
Within the temple grounds stands a stone monument bearing the inscription "Nichinichi kore kōnichi" ("Every day is a good day") by Inejirō Asanuma. The inscription reproduces calligraphy that Asanuma wrote on 4 September 1960, a little over a month before he was assassinated, when he gave a lecture at this temple.

The inscription remains a symbol of Asanuma’s dedication to promoting peace and social justice. After his death, which shocked Japan and the international community, local residents who had attended the lecture erected the monument in his memory.
