= All-Japan Farmers' Union (1927–1928) =

All-Japan Farmers' Union (全日本農民組合, Zen Nihon Nōmin Kumiai, abbreviated as Zen'nichinō or Zen'nichi) was a national organization of farmers' unions in Japan. It was formed in March 1927 mainly by the moderate faction of the Japan Farmers' Union (Nichinō). Key figures involved included Motojirō Sugiyama, Shōichi Miyake, Ko Sunaga, and Inejirō Asanuma. In May 1928, it merged again with Nichinō to form the National Farmers' Union (Zennō).

At the end of 1927, the organization had 340 branches and approximately 16,000 members. Its official organ was the newspaper Zen Nihon Nōmin.

== History ==
=== Formation ===
In March 1926 (Taishō 15), the Labour-Farmer Party (Rōnōtō) was formed under the leadership of the Japan Federation of Labour (Sōdōmei) and the Japan Farmers' Union (Nichinō). Internal conflict arose within the party over the issue of opening its doors to the left wing.

On 24 October 1926, right-wing groups including Sōdōmei announced their withdrawal from the Labour-Farmer Party at its fourth Central Executive Committee meeting. They formed the Social Democratic Party on 5 December. On 9 December, moderate labour unions and part of Nichinō formed the Japan Labour-Farmer Party (Nichirōtō), with Sugiyama, Sunaga, Miyake, Asanuma and others participating from Nichinō.

In December 1926, Nichinō's fourth Central Committee discussed the party issue and decided to support the merger of the Labour-Farmer Party and Japan Labour-Farmer Party, while provisionally supporting the Labour-Farmer Party. At the same time, Central Committee Chairman Sugiyama Motojirō and others expressed their intention to resign. In response, Asanuma, Sunaga and others from the Japan Labour-Farmer Party faction established the "National Council for Support of the Japan Labour-Farmer Party, Support for Chairman Sugiyama, and Opposition to Split" and conducted propaganda among union members.

In January 1927 (Shōwa 2), Sunaga, Miyake and others formed the Steady Alliance as a faction within Nichinō. On 4 February, Nichinō's Central Standing Committee decided to expel 12 people including Sunaga, Miyake and Asanuma.

On 1 March 1927, the expelled leaders held the founding congress of the All-Japan Farmers' Union at the Tennoji Public Hall in Osaka. Sugiyama Motojirō was elected chairman, Shōichi Miyake became chief secretary, and central committee members included Ko Sunaga, Inejirō Asanuma, Michio Hosono, Chōzō Yukimasa, and Ken'ichi Yoshida.

As a result, Japan's farmers' unions split into several groups: the Labour-Farmer Party-supporting Japan Farmers' Union (Nichinō), the Japan Farmers' Party-supporting All-Japan Farmers' Union Alliance (Zen'nichinō Alliance), the Japan Labour-Farmer Party-supporting All-Japan Farmers' Union (Zen'nichinō), and the Shakai Taishūtō-supporting Japan Farmers' Union General Alliance.

=== Path to Re-merger ===
Although the farmers' unions were divided, calls for reunification grew stronger. In July 1927, the Zen'nichinō San'in Federation proposed merger to the Nichinō Shimane Federation, but Zen'nichinō responded by expelling those who made the proposal. In October 1927, a statement calling for the immediate merger of Zen'nichinō and Nichinō was issued under the name "All-Japan Farmers' Union Reform Alliance".

Amid growing momentum for reunification of the farmers' front, a joint consultation meeting between Nichinō, Zen'nichinō and the Zen'nichinō Alliance began on 16 March 1928. After the Zen'nichinō Alliance withdrew over the party issue, Nichinō and Zen'nichinō merged on 27 May 1928 to found the National Farmers' Union (Zennō).
