= Kenichi Hirosawa =

- 広沢 賢一

Member of the House of Representatives
- In office 29 January 1967 – 2 December 1969
- Preceded by: Hyō Hara
- Succeeded by: Michiko Watanabe
- Constituency: Tokyo 1st

Personal details
- Born: 15 March 1919 Tokyo, Japan
- Died: 15 February 2003 (aged 83) Shibuya, Tokyo, Japan
- Party: Socialist
- Other political affiliations: Left Socialist (1951–1955)
- Education: Waseda University
- Occupation: Politician, political activist
- Awards: Junior Fifth Rank (posthumous); Order of the Rising Sun, Gold Rays with Rosette (4th Class)

Kenichi Hirosawa (広沢 賢一, Hirosawa Kenichi; 15 March 1919 – 15 February 2003) was a Japanese politician and political activist. He was a member of the Japan Socialist Party (JSP) and served one term in the House of Representatives.

== Biography ==
Hirosawa was born in Tokyo Prefecture in 1919. He graduated from the Faculty of Political Science and Economics at Waseda University in 1942.

After Japan's defeat in World War II, he joined the Socialist Political and Economic Research Institute led by Ōuchi Hyōei and Mosaburō Suzuki, becoming a staff member. In 1949, he was appointed secretary at the JSP headquarters. He later served as secretary to Suzuki while holding positions such as deputy secretary-general of the party's Policy Deliberation Council and director of the organization department's planning office.

In 1959, he accompanied a JSP delegation to the People's Republic of China led by Secretary-General Inejirō Asanuma. Although Asanuma came from the right wing of the party and nicknamed Hirosawa (from the leftist Suzuki-Mosaburō /Sasaki faction) "Gokusa" (a misreading of "far-left"), he commissioned Hirosawa to draft his speech. Hirosawa prepared a strongly leftist draft, hesitating over the phrasing regarding "American imperialism" as a common "what" with China, considering options like "enemy" or "challenge", but Asanuma decisively chose "enemy." The resulting speech, reported as "American imperialism is the common enemy of Japan and China," was welcomed in China but drew sharp criticism from the United States, the Liberal Democratic Party (Japan), and even within the JSP.

In the 1963 general election, Hirosawa ran in Tokyo's 1st district as a JSP candidate but lost, finishing as runner-up. He had originally planned to run in Tokyo's 6th district, but due to demands from the Japan Postal Workers' Union (supporting the Sasaki faction) to nominate Yasuo Yasuda instead or else withhold support for JSP candidates in Tokyo, Hirosawa was shifted. Tokyo's 1st district had previously been held by Kyōko Asanuma (widow of Inejirō Asanuma, assassinated in 1960) for one term. Despite opposition from Kyōko Asanuma, who protested at the Central Executive Committee against what she called a "Soga conspiracy," Hirosawa's candidacy was approved leveraging the union's position.

In the 1967 general election, he ran again in Tokyo's 1st district and won his only term in the House of Representatives. He lost his seat in the 1969 general election to Kiyomasa Kato.

After leaving the Diet, he lectured at the Workers' University, served as a committee member of the Japan-China Friendship Association, and as a director of the Kimura Economic Research Institute. As a leftist, he criticized the JSP's shift toward social democracy, advocating anti-Americanism, support for the United Nations Charter, and defense of the constitution. Until his later years, he emphasized the need for a unified left-wing front and maintained close ties with members of the Social Democratic Party, New Socialist Party, and the Japanese Communist Party, and others.

In the spring 1999 honors, he was awarded the Order of the Rising Sun, Gold Rays with Rosette (4th class).

Hirosawa died of myocardial infarction on 15 February 2003 at a hospital in Shibuya, Tokyo. He was posthumously promoted to Junior Fifth Rank.
