= Operations Deliberation Committee =

Advisory body of the Japan Sumo Association

The Operations Deliberation Committee (運営審議委員会, Un'ei Shingi Iinkai) was an advisory body of the Japan Sumo Association. It was commonly abbreviated as Unshin (運審) or referred to as the Operations Deliberation Council (運営審議会, Un'ei Shingikai).

It was established in September 1957. Following the Japan Sumo Association's transition to a public interest incorporated foundation, the committee was dissolved after its final regular meeting in September 2014.

== Overview ==
In 1957, the Association came under pressure for rapid reform after Hiroichi Tsujihara, a member of the House of Representatives from the Japan Socialist Party, criticized it in the House of Representatives Budget Committee on March 2, stating that "although it is a public-interest corporation, it is commercial in nature." Further pressure arose from testimony given by Musashigawa (former maegashira Dewanohana Kuniichi) and others before the House of Representatives Education Committee on April 3.

Shortly afterward, Tokitsukaze (former yokozuna Futabayama Sadaji), who had just assumed the position of chairman of the Association, responded to criticism that the Association's management was closed by establishing a committee composed of external experts to seek broad, high-level advice. This led to the creation of the Operations Deliberation Committee. It formed a core element of the "democratization of the Association," an urgent priority of the Tokitsukaze administration.

According to the Association's articles of incorporation at the time, the committee was to consist of between 7 and 15 members. Members were appointed by the chairman from among learned individuals who were sumo enthusiasts (kōkakuka), subject to a resolution of the board of directors. The term of office was two years, with reappointment permitted; consequently, many members served for longer than two years. Although described as "learned individuals," the members were frequently prominent figures from political and business circles, and the committee functioned as a form of external oversight or "watchdog." Members served without remuneration. In the early years, the Association held meetings at traditional Japanese restaurants (ryōtei) as a form of hospitality, but at the regular meeting in January 1972 the committee requested that this practice be discontinued. Subsequent regular meetings were held at the Ryōgoku Kokugikan. (The Yokozuna Deliberation Council, which had similarly held meetings at ryōtei, also later abolished the practice.)

Regular meetings were held during the January, May, and September tournaments. The principal agenda items were the Association's business plan and budget for the current fiscal year, and opinions on the business report and financial statements of the previous fiscal year. Extraordinary meetings were convened as needed when urgent matters arose.

== Members ==
The original members appointed at the time of establishment in 1957 were as follows (titles are those held at the time):

- Chairman – Reinosuke Suga (president of Tokyo Electric Power Company)
- Members – Toshi Kaneko (president of Fuji Bank), Hajime Ōkami (president of Yamaichi Securities), Hiroshi Anzai (vice-president of Tokyo Gas), Taihei Morinaga (president of Morinaga & Company), Shigeo Mizuno (president of Kokusaku Pulp), Tadao Sasayama (president of Alaska Pulp), Masaichi Nagata (president of Daiei Film), Naoshi Shibanuma (auditor of the Japan Atomic Energy Research Institute), Shigemasa Sunada (chairman of the General Council of the Liberal Democratic Party), Inejirō Asanuma (secretary-general of the Japan Socialist Party), Shunsaku Kawahara (president of Ōtsuma Women's University), and Tatsuo Mitarai (critic)

== See also ==
- Yokozuna Deliberation Council
