= Kyōko Asanuma =

Japanese politician (1904–1981)

- 浅沼 享子
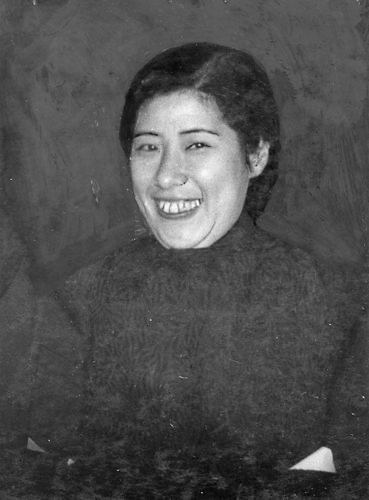
- Asanuma in 1936

Member of the House of Representatives
- In office 20 November 1960 – 23 October 1963
- Preceded by: Inejirō Asanuma
- Succeeded by: Yoshikata Asō
- Constituency: Tokyo 1st

Personal details
- Born: Kyōko Takeda; 1 February 1904 Hita, Ōita, Japan
- Died: 10 March 1981 (aged 77) Tokyo, Japan
- Resting place: Tama Cemetery
- Party: Socialist
- Spouse: Inejirō Asanuma (m. 1928; died 1960)
- Children: Kinue Asanuma (adopted)
- Relatives: Hanjirō Asanuma (father-in-law)
- Known for: Widow and successor of Inejirō Asanuma; Japan–China friendship advocate

Kyoko Asanuma (浅沼 享子, Asanuma Kyōko; 1 February 1904 – 10 March 1981) was a Japanese politician of the Shōwa era. She served one term as a member of the House of Representatives for the Japan Socialist Party (JSP) and played a prominent public role following the assassination of her husband, Inejirō Asanuma, then chairman of the JSP, by 17-year-old far-right ultranationalist Otoya Yamaguchi, and after Yamaguchi’s suicide in custody shortly thereafter, she publicly expressed pity for him while condemning the forces that had incited his actions.

Beyond her brief political career, she was known for her efforts in women's activism and fostering diplomatic and cultural ties between Japan and China.

== Early life ==
Kyōko Asanuma, née Kyōko Takeda (武田 享子), was born on 1 February 1904, in Hita, Ōita Prefecture, on the island of Kyushu, as the daughter of dentist Tsuneichi Takeda (武田恒市). She graduated from the upper division of Hita Elementary School. At age 17, she married but could not adapt to the overly feudal customs of her husband's family and divorced soon after. She left Kyushu for Tokyo, intending to study dressmaking to support herself.

== Marriage and family life ==
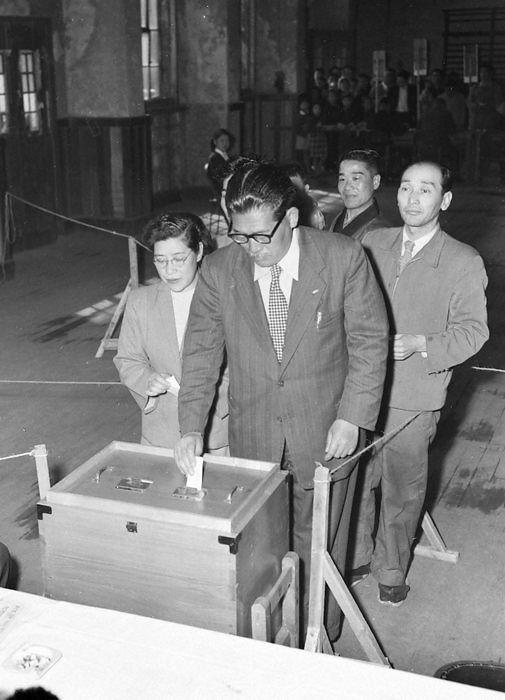
Inejirō Asanuma casts his ballot in the 1953 general election, with his wife Kyōko beside him, 19 April 1953.

She initially worked at the Kyodokai-kan cafeteria, a gathering spot for socialists, before moving to a café where she met Inejirō Asanuma, then a regular customer and future chairman of the Japan Socialist Party, in 1927. She married him in the fall of 1928.

The couple was known for Inejirō being both a "henpecked husband" and a deeply devoted spouse. Inejirō himself quoted his wife's wry complaint about their Dōjunkai apartment constantly being filled with political visitors: "Is this apartment a railway station?", a playful jab that played on his famous "human locomotive" nickname.

The couple had no biological children but adopted Kinue, a distant relative of Inejirō Asanuma. Inejirō and Kyōko had hoped to one day supplement their modest apartment life by becoming "Sunday farmers" to get closer to nature once his political career slowed down, but this dream remained unrealized due to his assassination in 1960.

In 1945, she joined the Japan Socialist Party and became a permanent administrator of the Women's Issues Research Committee.

== Assassination of her husband and aftermath ==
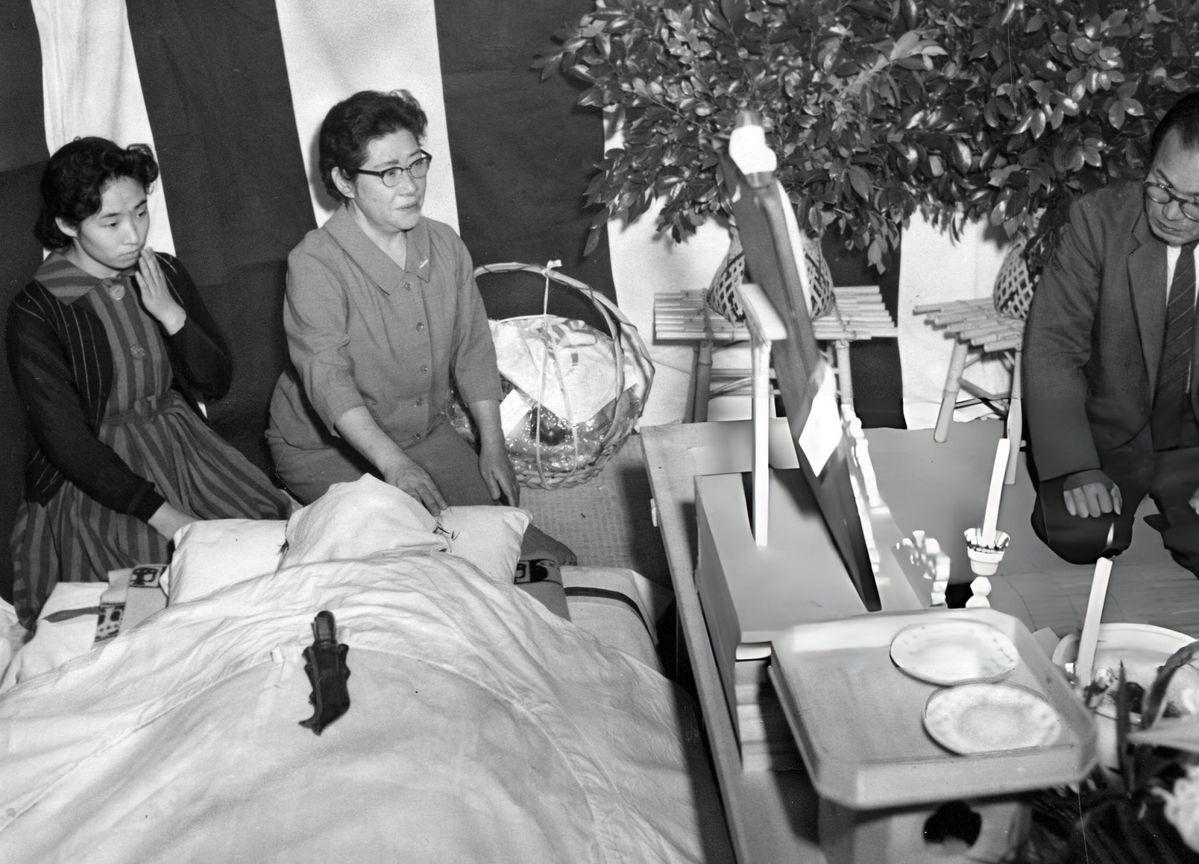
Kyōko Asanuma and her daughter Kinue at Inejirō Asanuma's wake following his assassination, 12 October 1960. On his chest rests a mamori-gatana, a ceremonial knife traditionally placed on the deceased as a talisman to ward off evil spirits and protect the soul on its journey to the afterlife.

On 12 October 1960, Kyōko's husband Inejirō was assassinated by right-wing youth Otoya Yamaguchi while delivering a speech at Hibiya Public Hall. While watching a tape-delayed broadcast of the debate (which had been preempted by coverage of the Japan Series baseball championships), Kyōko saw a breaking news scroll announcing that her husband had been stabbed. She jumped up, called to her daughter, prepared a change of clothes for him, and rushed by taxi first to Hibiya Hall and then to the hospital, where she learned he had died. In the days that followed, occupied with funeral arrangements and obligations, she had no opportunity to listen to an audio recording of his final speech sent by the television network. Five days later, while preparing to leave for an Assembly Meeting against Terrorism, she saw the assassination footage for the first time on the noon news. The experience shocked her intensely, as if witnessing the event "intimately and intensely" for the first time.

According to former Mainichi Shimbun reporter Michio Ozaki, then a Waseda University student, a group of students spontaneously visited the Asanuma family’s modest rented apartment in Kōtō Ward to pay condolences on the evening of the assassination. A worker-like man greeted them politely with the words "Students, thanks for your trouble" and guided them inside. There, Kyōko Asanuma and her son-in-law Norikuni Nakano (then at Fuji TV) bowed deeply to the visiting mourners in front of the body."

The family received extensive correspondence following the assassination, including condolences and memorial messages from socialist and labor organizations, Japan Communist Party groups, journalists, students, Korean organizations, religious figures, and ordinary citizens, as well as protests against the assassination and political violence. The National Diet Library catalogue records correspondents from diverse backgrounds, including a Self-Defense Forces aircraft mechanic from Ōita and a Buddhist priest who sent Kyōko a handwritten condolence accompanied by a calligraphic inscription of "Namu Myōhō Renge Kyō." The correspondence also included criticism of Asanuma's conduct during his lifetime and, in one letter to Kyōko and Kinue, a "criticism of the Jewish people"; the catalogue does not provide enough of the latter letter to determine its precise argument. One later correspondent sent sheet music titled "ASANUMAに捧ぐ" (Dedicated to Asanuma).

At Inejirō's funeral on 20 October 1960, held at Hibiya Public Hall and attended by over 2,600 representatives, Kyōko Asanuma delivered a reply speech during the ceremony, where condolences from Chinese Premier Zhou Enlai and other international groups were also read. In her speech, she expressed deep sorrow over the circumstances of the assassination and gratitude for the condolences.

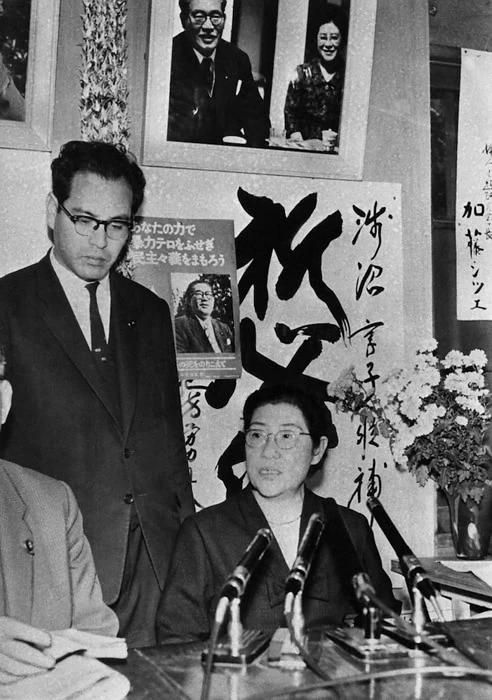
Kyōko at a press conference following news of Otoya Yamaguchi's suicide, 3 November 1960.

On 2 November 1960, Otoya Yamaguchi committed suicide in detention. The next day, 3 November Kyōko Asanuma held a press conference to respond to the news. She stated that she learned of the suicide from the morning newspapers and expressed pity rather than hatred toward the young man, while strongly condemning the forces behind him that incited the act:

I first learned of Yamaguchi’s suicide this morning through the newspaper. Rather than feeling hatred toward the boy, I feel more pity for him. My anger is burning up from the bottom of my heart once again toward the unseen forces that instilled such dangerous ideas into a 17-year-old boy and drove him to commit assassination.

Her response was widely regarded as an embodiment of the principle of "hating the sin but not the sinner".

== Political career ==
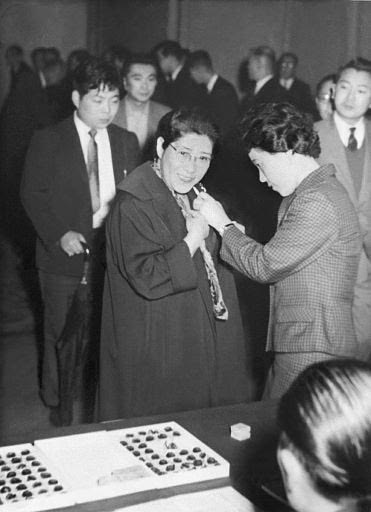
Kyōko Asanuma receives her parliamentary badge on her first visit to the Diet, 5 December 1960

In November of the same year, she ran in the general election in Tokyo's 1st district under the Socialist label. She won her first election, placing second behind former Tokyo Governor Seiichirō Yasui and ahead of Yoshikata Asō of the Democratic Socialist Party. Correspondence preserved by the National Diet Library shows that she was encouraged to enter politics soon after her husband's assassination, with letters urging her to run, followed by campaign support and congratulations after her victory. One correspondent, Igarashi Reido, encouraged her to display a photograph of Inejirō during campaign speeches and enclosed calligraphy calling for the overthrow of the Liberal Democratic Party government, illustrating how her husband's political legacy was incorporated into her campaign. The National Diet Library also preserves election reports, speech drafts, and posters from her successful run in the 29th House of Representatives election, as well as related correspondence.

During her single term she mainly spoke in the Social and Labor Committee and the Education Committee. Her interventions focused on child welfare (including amendments to the Child Allowance Law), mother-and-child welfare funds, vocational training for widows and the unemployed, and a local school-closure dispute in Tokyo. In May 1962 she also delivered a short speech in the plenary session supporting a cross-party resolution on strengthening narcotics control. She served only one term and retired from politics before the elections of 1963. She attended the 5th anniversary memorial at her husband's tomb in Tama Cemetery on 12 October 1965, alongside JSP Chairman Kōzō Sasaki and others.

== Later life and activism ==
After retiring from politics, Kyōko Asanuma engaged in promoting friendship between Japan and China. In August 1965, a relief of Inejirō Asanuma was sent by her to the Inejiro Asanuma Spinning Mill (Hilandería Inejiro Asanuma) in Gibara, Holguín Province, Cuba; a plaque at the entrance of the factory is inscribed "INEJIRO ASANUMA ENVIADO POR SU ESPOSA AGOSTO 1965" (Inejiro Asanuma – Sent by his wife – August 1965). In 1964, she attended the 15th anniversary celebrations of the People's Republic of China in Beijing. On 9 October 1964, she participated in the signing ceremony of a joint statement between the China-Japan Friendship Association and the Japan-China Friendship Association, signed by Liao Chengzhi and Matsumoto Jiichiro, aiming to strengthen mutual support against common enemies, and attended by figures like Guo Moruo.

In 1970, she visited China once. In October she sent a written statement that was read by Shichirō Hozumi at the Beijing rally commemorating the 10th anniversary of her husband's assassination; in the statement she reaffirmed Asanuma's 1959 declaration that "American imperialism is the common enemy of the Japanese and Chinese peoples," praised the Cultural Revolution, and called for the spirit of Asanuma to serve as a fighting banner for the 1970s. She herself was unable to attend the rally for health and family reasons. In December she visited Beijing, accompanied by her daughter Kinue, son-in-law Norikuni Nakano, and others. On 6 December they met Premier Zhou Enlai and Vice Chairman Guo Moruo. Nakano, then a Fuji TV journalist, discussed Japanese pollution and environmental problems with Zhou, including issues such as Minamata disease and lead pollution. The meeting contributed to the early exchange of information on environmental protection between Japan and China.

Kyoko Asanuma was one of the key initiators for the formation of the "Women's Liaison Committee to Promote Japan-China Diplomatic Normalization and Friendship" (日中国交回復と友好をすすめる婦人連絡会), alongside figures like Tanaka Sumiko, Yamakawa Kikue, Ishigaki Ayako, Sata Ineko, Kubushiro Ochimi, and Sugimura Haruko. This group conducted advocacy activities toward the government to advance normalization.

Kyōko Asanuma also met Deng Xiaoping during his state visit to Japan in October 1978. At a reception at the Akasaka State Guest House in Tokyo, she was received alongside Liao Chengzhi (vice chairman of the Standing Committee of the National People's Congress) and Foreign Minister Huang Hua. Deng thanked the families of deceased "old friends" of Japan–China friendship, including Asanuma's widow. On 31 May 1978, she met with Deng Yingchao, Vice Chairperson of the National People's Congress Standing Committee.

In May 1980, she was invited to a meeting in Tokyo with Chinese Premier Hua Guofeng honoring families of deceased Japanese friends of China but was unable to attend due to old age and frailty. She died in Tokyo on 10 March 1981, at the age of 77. The specific cause of death is not publicly documented.

== Death and legacy ==
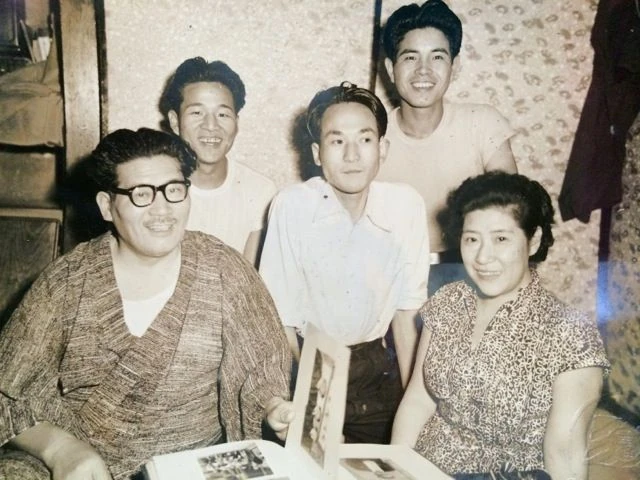
Inejirō and Kyōko Asanuma with three students

Shortly after her passing, the 29 March 1981 issue of Sunday Mainichi published a profile titled “Pioneer of the ‘Cohabitation Era’ — Kyōko Asanuma (Mrs. Inejirō Asanuma): A Life of Dedication” (「“同せい時代”の先駆 浅沼享子さん（稲次郎氏夫人）献身の生涯」) portraying her as an early example of a modern, equal partnership in marriage and highlighting her devoted support for her husband throughout their 34 years together. She is buried at Tama Cemetery.

Kyōko Asanuma published a personal memoir titled Together with My Husband Inejirō Asanuma (夫 浅沼稲次郎とともに) in the magazine Fujin Kōron in December 1960, recounting 34 years of marriage, shared struggles, and her recovery after the assassination. The text was reprinted in 2010 in a selection of the magazine's archives.

== See also ==
- Inejirō Asanuma
