= Yoshikata Asō =

Japanese politician (1923–1995)

- 麻生 良方
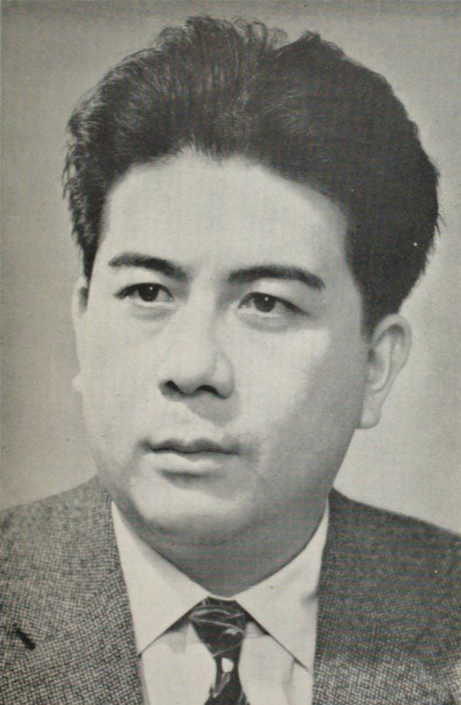
- Asō in 1960

Member of the House of Representatives
- In office 10 December 1976 – 14 March 1979
- Preceded by: Kiyomasa Katō
- Succeeded by: Ichio Asukata
- Constituency: Tokyo 1st
- In office 22 November 1963 – 13 November 1972
- Preceded by: Kyōko Asanuma
- Succeeded by: Kiyomasa Katō
- Constituency: Tokyo 1st

Personal details
- Born: 15 December 1923 Tokyo, Japan
- Died: 21 February 1995 (aged 71)
- Resting place: Tama Cemetery
- Party: Independent (after 1972)
- Other political affiliations: JSP (1945–1951; 1955–1960); RSP (1951–1955); DSP (1960–1972)
- Parent: Hisashi Asō (father)
- Education: Waseda University (Faculty of Letters, withdrew)
- Occupation: Politician, political commentator Former secretary to Inejirō Asanuma
- Awards: Junior Fourth Rank; 2nd Class, Order of the Sacred Treasure

Yoshikata Aso (麻生 良方, Asō Yoshikata; 15 December 1923 – 21 February 1995) was a Japanese politician and political commentator. The son of prewar socialist politician Hisashi Asō (a key mentor to Inejirō Asanuma), he served as a member of the House of Representatives for four terms, initially with the Japan Socialist Party and later as a founder and member of the Democratic Socialist Party. He was the private secretary and protégé of JSP chairman Inejirō Asanuma, and was also known as a friend of the writer Yukio Mishima.

== Early life and career ==
Asō was born in Tokyo Prefecture. He was the eldest son of Hisashi Asō, a pre-war leader of the proletarian parties in Japan. In his youth, he aspired to become a poet and self-published a poetry collection titled Blue Rose (青薔薇) in 1943, which he placed in local bookstores.

He graduated from the old-system Kaisei Middle School (now Kaisei High School) and withdrew from the Waseda University Faculty of Letters in 1945. He then joined the headquarters of the Japan Socialist Party and became the private secretary and protégé of Inejirō Asanuma in 1950.

In the 1959 House of Councillors election for the Tokyo at-large district (4 seats), the Japan Socialist Party fielded incumbent Sōji Okada, newcomer Asō, and Ushitarō Okamoto. Due to vote splitting, all three lost. He later became secretary-general of the Democratic Socialist League.

He participated in the formation of the Democratic Socialist Party in January 1960.

On 12 October 1960, Asanuma was assassinated at Hibiya Public Hall. On 24 October, the House of Representatives was dissolved. The Japan Socialist Party nominated Asanuma's wife Kyōko Asanuma as successor in the Tokyo 1st district (4 seats). The Democratic Socialist Party sent Asō as a spoiler candidate against her. Sympathy votes went to Kyōko, while Asō faced criticism as a "traitor" and finished as runner-up in the 1960 Japanese general election.

He won his first election in the 1963 Japanese general election and served in roles such as deputy secretary-general of his party.

In 1965, based on the Parliamentary League for Arts within the National Diet, he established the International Art Fair Association (approved by the Ministry of International Trade and Industry), becoming its founding chairman. In March 1966, the association held its first event, the 1st Japan Art Festival in New York.

He was re-elected in 1967. As chairman of the Democratic Socialist Party's Tokyo federation, he directly approached Masatoshi Matsushita, chairman of the Japan Congress Against A- and H-Bombs (Gensuikyo affiliate), to run as the party's candidate in the 1967 Tokyo gubernatorial election. Matsushita accepted, gaining joint endorsement from the Democratic Socialists and Liberal Democrats, but lost narrowly to Ryokichi Minobe (backed by Socialists and Communists) in April 1967.

He won a third term in December 1969.

In the 1972 Japanese general election, the Liberal Democrats fielded two candidates, while the Socialists, Communists, Komeito, and Democratic Socialists each fielded one. Asō received the lowest votes among the six candidates and lost. The top vote went to Communist newcomer Yojirō Konyo, which reportedly hurt Asō's pride. He left the party after this defeat and became a political commentator.

In 1974, Liberal Democratic Party Secretary-General Masumi Esaki invited Asō to a favorite restaurant and urged him to run in the 1975 Tokyo gubernatorial election. When he declined, Ken Yasui, chairman of the LDP House of Councillors caucus, called to press him a week later. This sparked his renewed interest in politics.

Running as an independent in the 1976 Japanese general election on 5 December 1976, he topped the poll in Tokyo 1st district. On 30 December, he co-founded the "Independent Club" caucus in the House of Representatives with Tokuma Utsunomiya, Kunio Hatoyama, and others from Tokyo districts.

In November 1977, he confided to colleague Utsunomiya his plan to resign from the Diet to run for Tokyo governor but was opposed.

He ran as an independent (backed by Liberal Democrats, Democratic Socialists, and Komeito) in the 1979 Tokyo gubernatorial election on 8 April (results 9 April), finishing third behind winner Shunichi Suzuki and Kaoru Ōta (Socialist-Communist backed). The Asahi Shimbun headline the next morning noted "Asō puts up good fight, eats into Ōta's urban votes." In the subsequent unified local elections second round (22 April), he supported Minoru Sakuma (backed by Liberal Democrats, Komeito, Democratic Socialists, New Liberal Club) over Yoshimichi Aoyama (Socialist-Communist-SDF-RCL) in the Nakano mayoral race, leading to accusations that his gubernatorial run was intended to split the left-wing vote.

He ran again as an independent in the 1979 Japanese general election in October but finished sixth and forfeited his deposit. He declared his retirement from politics, established the Asō Information and Culture Research Institute, and became its director.

In the spring 1994 honors, he received the 2nd Class, Order of the Sacred Treasure.

He died on 21 February 1995, aged 71. On 24 February, he was posthumously awarded Junior Fourth Rank by special imperial grace, effective from his date of death. His grave is at Tama Cemetery (Section 9, Type 1, Row 13).

== Episodes ==
He was one of Yukio Mishima's close friends and served as the model for the protagonist in Mishima's novel False Don Juan Diary (贋ドン・ファン記). In 1967, Mishima consulted him, saying "The only thing I haven't done is politics, but I really want to try this."

He was a member of the literary magazine Politique (ポリタイア), launched in 1968, and co-sponsored it with Masataka Sekō across party lines.

== Selected works ==
- In Search of Love and Poetry (恋と詩を求めて, Nekko Bunko Taiyōsha, 1966)
- Opening Tomorrow (明日をひらく, Nekko Bunko Taiyōsha, 1966)
- The Assassin: Postwar History of Intrigue (暗殺者 謀略の戦後史, Kōsaidō Publishing, 1975)
- My Hands Were Also Dirty (私の手も汚れていた, Nikkei Tsūshinsha, 1976)
- The Awaited New Politician (新政治家待望論, Yamate Shobō, 1976)
- Elegy to Revolution: Autobiographical Postwar Secret History (革命への挽歌 自伝的戦後秘史, Kodansha, 1977)
- We the Independents (われら無党派, with Kunio Hatoyama, Tokuma Utsunomiya,荒地出版社, 1977–6–24)
- The Drama of Politics Is Over (政治のドラマは終わった, Nihon Shoseki, 1979–6–20)
