= Tokyo 1st district (1947–1993) =

Former Japan House of Representatives constituency

Tokyo's 1st district was a constituency of the House of Representatives in the Diet of Japan (national legislature). Between 1947 and 1993 it elected four, later three representatives by single non-transferable vote. It initially consisted of Tokyo's Chiyoda, Chūō, Minato, Shinjuku, Bunkyō and Taitō special wards. In the 1964 redistricting Chūō, Bunkyō and Taitō were split off to form the new 8th district.

It was represented by several influential political leaders in postwar Japan, namely right-wing Socialist Inejirō Asanuma, Communist Sanzō Nosaka and, after the lifting of SCAP Douglas MacArthur's purge and his recovery from a stroke, anti-mainstream conservative Ichirō Hatoyama. Later representatives included former Tokyo governor Seiichirō Yasui, construction minister Yūji Ōtsuka, JSP chairman Ichio Asukata, education minister Kaoru Yosano and Shimin League president and DPJ co-founder Banri Kaieda.

== Summary of results during the 1955 party system ==
General election		1958	1960	1963	1967	1969	1972	1976	1979	1980	1983	1986	1990	1993
LDP & conservative independents		2	2	2	1	1	1	2	1	2	2	2	2	1
Opposition	center-left	0	0	1	1	2	0	1	1	0	1	1	0	2
Opposition	JSP	2	2	1	1	0	1	0	1	1	0	0	1	0
Opposition	JCP	0	0	0	0	0	1	0	0	0	0	0	0	0
Seats up		4			3									

== Elected Representatives ==
election year	highest vote (top tōsen)	2nd	3rd	4th
1947	Inejirō Asanuma (JSP)	Yoshio Sakurauchi (DP)	Hyō Hara (JSP)	Sanzō Nosaka (JCP)
1949	Sanzō Nosaka (JCP)	Mitsuharu Ide (DLP)	Inejirō Asanuma (JSP)	Sentarō Nomura (DLP)
1952	Ichirō Hatoyama (LP)	Inejirō Asanuma (JSP, right)	Hyō Hara (JSP, left)	Masuzumi Andō (LP)
1953	Ichirō Hatoyama (Hatoyama LP)	Inejirō Asanuma (JSP, right)	Masuzumi Andō (Yoshida LP)	Hyō Hara (JSP, left)
1955	Ichirō Hatoyama (JDP)	Masuzumi Andō (JDP)	Hyō Hara (JSP, left)	Inejirō Asanuma (JSP, right)
1958	Eiichi Tanaka (LDP)	Inejirō Asanuma (JSP)	Hyō Hara (JSP)	Ichirō Hatoyama (LDP)
1960	Seiichirō Yasui (LDP)	Keiko (?) Asanuma (JSP)	Eiichi Tanaka (LDP)	Hyō Hara (JSP)
1963	Eiichi Tanaka (LDP)	Yoshikata Asō (DSP)	Hyō Hara (JSP)	Kyūkichi Shinomiya (?) (LDP)
1967	Eiichi Tanaka (LDP)	Kenichi Hirosawa (JSP)	Yoshikata Asō (DSP)	–
1969	Eiichi Tanaka (LDP)	Yoshikata Asō (DSP)	Michiko Watanabe (Kōmeitō)	–
1972	Yojirō Konno (JCP)	Eiichi Tanaka (LDP)	Kiyomasa Katō (JSP)	–
1976	Yoshikata Asō (Indep.)	Kaoru Yosano (LDP)	Yūji Ōtsuka (LDP)	–
1979	Ichio Asukata (JSP)	Yoshiaki Kiuchi (Kōmeitō)	Yūji Ōtsuka (LDP)	–
1980	Kaoru Yosano (LDP)	Yūji Ōtsuka (LDP)	Ichio Asukata (JSP)	–
1983	Kaoru Yosano (LDP)	Yūji Ōtsuka (LDP)	Yoshiaki Kiuchi (Kōmeitō)	–
1986	Kaoru Yosano (LDP)	Yūji Ōtsuka (LDP)	Yoshiaki Kiuchi (Kōmeitō)	–
1990	Kikuko Suzuki (JSP)	Kaoru Yosano (LDP)	Yūji Ōtsuka (LDP)	–
1993	Banri Kaieda (JNP)	Kaoru Yosano (LDP)	Taizō Shibano (JRP)	–

== Election results ==
1993: Tokyo 1st
Party	Candidate	Votes	%	±%
New Party	Banri Kaieda	63,939	29.15	new
LDP	Kaoru Yosano	39,867	18.18	▼6.69
Shinseito	Taizō Shibano	34,784	15.86	new
LDP	Yūji Ōtsuka	28,382	12.94	▼7.12
Socialist	Kikuko Suzuki	26,711	12.18	▼15.92
JCP	Hideo Fudesaka	24,542	11.19	▲1.94
Independent	Unkai Imaizumi	530	0.24	new
Independent	Ken Tōgō	450	0.21	new
Independent	Kōsetsu Asano	118	0.05	new
Turnout		385,773	57.47	▼5.51
New Party gain from Socialist				
LDP hold				
Shinseito gain from LDP				

1990: Tokyo 1st
Party	Candidate	Votes	%	±%
Socialist	Kikuko Suzuki	72,117	28.10	▲12.12
LDP	Kaoru Yosano	63,824	24.87	▼2.23
LDP	Yūji Ōtsuka	54,490	20.06	▼2.42
Kōmeitō	Yoshiaki Kiuchi	43,321	16.88	▼3.66
JCP	Hideo Fudesaka	23,754	9.25	▼4.13
Independent	Takashi Kubota	1,188	0.46	new
Independent	Ryū Ōta	341	0.13	new
Truth Party	Kazuko Matsumoto	276	0.11	new
Independent	Junichi Kiyohara	187	0.07	new
Independent	Yukio Kimoto	169	0.07	new
Turnout		411,726	62.98	▲6.18
Socialist gain from Kōmeitō				
LDP hold				
LDP hold				
