= Michio Asanuma =

- 浅沼 美智雄
- Born: November 19, 1915; Hachijō-jima, Tokyo, Japan
- Died: 2001 (aged 85–86)
- Other names: Asanuma Michio (浅沼 美知雄)
- Occupations: Political activist, right-wing activist
- Known for: Leadership in far-right/patriotic groups; 1959 House of Councillors candidacy; TV appearances on right-wing topics
- Relatives: Inejiro Asanuma (distant relative)
- Martial arts career
- Style: Aikido, Iaido, Calligraphy
- Rank: Aikido 4th dan Iaido 1st dan Calligraphy 5th dan

Michio Asanuma (浅沼 美智雄, Asanuma Michio; November 19, 1915 – 2001; also written as 浅沼 美知雄, Asanuma Michio) was a Japanese political activist and right-wing activist.

He served as vice representative and supreme advisor of the Greater Japan Patriotic Groups Federation – Current Affairs Countermeasures Council (大日本愛国団体連合・時局対策協議会, Jitaikyō or Jitaitai Kyō); editor-in-chief and director of the Anti-Communist Newspaper Company; participant and supreme advisor of the Greater Japan Patriotic Party; captain and advisor of the Anti-Communist Volunteer Corps; advisor to the Student Movement Pure Alliance; caretaker of the All-Japan Patriots Friendship Association; second-generation representative of the Greater Japan Patriotic Groups Federation; advisor to the Gakunan Gijuku; advisor to the Speech Comrades Association; and representative of the Imperial Way National Federation.

== Biography ==
Asanuma was born on Hachijō-jima, Tokyo. Inejiro Asanuma, originally from Miyake Village, was a distant relative.

He attended but did not graduate from the specialized department (senmon-bu) of Nihon University. He subsequently worked as a reporter for the Yomiuri Shimbun. After World War II, he joined the Japan Socialist Party and was elected to one term on the Suginami Ward Assembly.

In 1952, he defected from the right-wing faction of the Socialist Party to the far-right.

Thereafter, he advocated "amending the humiliating constitution, establishing self-defense military preparedness, and carrying out an Imperial Way Restoration." In 1953 he joined the Anti-Communist Newspaper Company, where he served successively as speech tour captain, editor-in-chief, and director. In December 1966 he was appointed vice chairman of the Greater Japan Patriotic Groups Federation – Current Affairs Countermeasures Council. Following the death of Soken Fukuda, he became acting representative and later full representative of the organization, and also served as director of 皇民評論 (Kōmin Hyōron). During this period he ran unsuccessfully in the 1959 House of Councillors election from the nationwide constituency under the name "Asanuma Michio".

He also held positions including participant in the Greater Japan Patriotic Party and advisor to the Student Pure Alliance.

On February 23, 1990, he appeared on the TV Asahi discussion program Asa Made Nama Terebi! in the episode titled "Intense Debate! Japan's Right Wing, Freedom of Speech, and Violence!!".

In the same year he appeared in the Fuji Television documentary program NONFIX episode "Heisei Right Wing Standing at the Turning Point" as supreme advisor of the Greater Japan Patriotic Party. During the program he spoke positively and with admiration about the character and actions of Otoya Yamaguchi, the assassin of his distant relative Inejiro Asanuma.

Kōmin Hyōron was the official publication of the Imperial Way National Federation, an organization that Asanuma led.

He held 4th dan in aikido, 1st dan in iaido, and 5th dan in calligraphy.

== Works ==
- Kono Nihon Kyōsantō [This Japanese Communist Party] (Taka Shobō, 1989)
- Taiketsu [Confrontation]
- Waga Ikari, Waga Sakebi [My Anger, My Cry]
