= Hanjirō Asanuma =

- 浅沼 半次郎
- Born: 1861
- Died: January 1951 (aged 89–90)
- Occupations: Village headman, dairy farmer
- Known for: Father of Inejirō Asanuma
- Spouse: Hisa Inoue
- Children: Toshi Asanuma (eldest daughter) and others

Hanjirō Asanuma (浅沼 半次郎, Asanuma Hanjirō; 1861 – January 1951) was a Japanese local official and farmer. He served as the village headman (sonchō or namushi) of Kamitsuki on Miyake Island (now part of Miyake, Tokyo) and was involved in the development of cattle breeding on the island, helping promote the introduction of Holstein cattle around 1898. He later operated a dairy farm in Sunamachi, Tokyo. He was the father of Inejirō Asanuma, the prominent Japan Socialist Party politician assassinated in 1960.

== Life ==
Hanjirō served as village headman of Kamitsuki on Miyake Island and was responsible for conducting military conscription examinations. Hanjirō was involved in the development of cattle breeding on Miyake Island. Around 1898, he, together with Shigejirō Asanuma and Kizō Asanuma, advocated the introduction of Holstein cattle to the island. A Holstein bull was purchased for breeding, after which village agricultural funds were used to purchase cattle from the Shimōsa Imperial Stock Farm, including a purebred Holstein-Friesian and two crossbred Holsteins.

The 1921 Tokyo Prefectural Livestock Overview likewise records that cattle were purchased from the Shimōsa Imperial Stock Farm and Yokohama by Hanjirō and others from Kamitsuki Village.

According to his son Inejirō's memoir, Hanjirō was taught works such as Nihon Gaishi and Jūhasshiryaku by an exile on Miyake Island who was versed in Chinese learning. Inejirō wrote that the island's culture had been greatly influenced by the exiles, and that his father had likewise received instruction from one of them.

When Inejirō announced his intention to attend Waseda University and become a politician after graduating from Tokyo Prefectural Third Middle School in 1916, Hanjirō severely reprimanded him:

In Taishō 5 [1916], after graduating from Prefectural Third Middle School, I told my father, 'I want to enter Waseda University and become a politician.' He scolded me severely. My father said, 'Politicians are the type who squander the family fortune and end up ruining the household—become a businessman, or go to Keio's medical school and become a doctor.'

Later, when Inejirō's leftist activities led to surveillance by military police (including one tailing him from Tokyo during a conscription examination), Hanjirō became so distressed that he considered resigning as village headman, but Inejirō persuaded him not to:

The following year, during the conscription examination, I returned to Miyake Island again, but this time a military policeman had deliberately come all the way from Tokyo to tail me. Ironically, it was my father, who was serving as village headman, who was in charge of executing the conscription examination. What with the previous exile to the island and now this surveillance, my father must have been quite troubled. He even talked about resigning as village headman, but I told him there was no need for parents to bear responsibility for their child's ideas, and I persuaded him to stay.

Inejirō was born as an illegitimate son (to concubine Yoshi Asaoka) and was not formally recognized until around age 13 (end of sixth grade of elementary school). He was then acknowledged as a legitimate son and brought to live in Tokyo. In January 1951, Hanjirō's death was announced to his son during a Japan Socialist Party congress at Waseda University Lecture Hall, while Inejirō was serving as secretary-general. Inejirō initially withheld public announcement of the news to avoid bad omens for the party. The following day he chaired the party funeral of fellow socialist Minekubo Manryō before traveling to Miyake Island:

In January of the 25th year [Shōwa 25 = 1950], at the party congress in Waseda University Lecture Hall, my father's death was announced to me. This was the congress where I was re-appointed as secretary-general, and announcing my father's death at that congress—while I don't necessarily believe in omens—seemed bad for the party, so I kept it secret. The next day there was the party funeral of the late Minekubo Manryō, and since I was serving as funeral committee chairman, I finished the funeral and only then headed to Miyake Island. There was no regular ferry service at the time, so I returned to Miyake Island on a small boat of about 100 tons, but in my haste I left my morning coat behind in a taxi along the way. Was this divine punishment for defying my father to become a politician, or for failing even to be at his deathbed? Such failures happened too.

The memoir dates these events to Shōwa 25 (1950), but this is considered a memory error or misrecording. Minekubo Manryō died on 16 January 1951 (Shōwa 26) from a cerebral hemorrhage, and the related party congress and funeral are historically documented as occurring in January 1951.

== Family ==
- Legal wife: Hisa Inoue (from Tokyo; sister of Okio Inoue according to some records)
  - Eldest daughter: Toshi Asanuma (married to Masahiko Nōmi of Fukuoka)
- Concubine: Yoshi Asaoka
  - Illegitimate son: Inejirō Asanuma (member of the House of Representatives, Japan Socialist Party leader)
  - Illegitimate daughter: Harue Asanuma (married to Gentarō Fukuda of Tochigi; eldest son of Fukuda Genshichi)

(Source: Asanuma family genealogy based on Jinji Kōshinroku and related biographical dictionaries. One biographical summary states that Hanjirō and his legal wife had no children at the time of Inejirō's birth and recognition (implying no legitimate heirs existed prior to acknowledging the illegitimate son), while the more detailed genealogy confirms at least one daughter from the marriage afterward. Birth years for Toshi and Harue are not recorded in available sources.)
