= Nichinichi kore kōnichi =

Japanese Zen Buddhist proverb

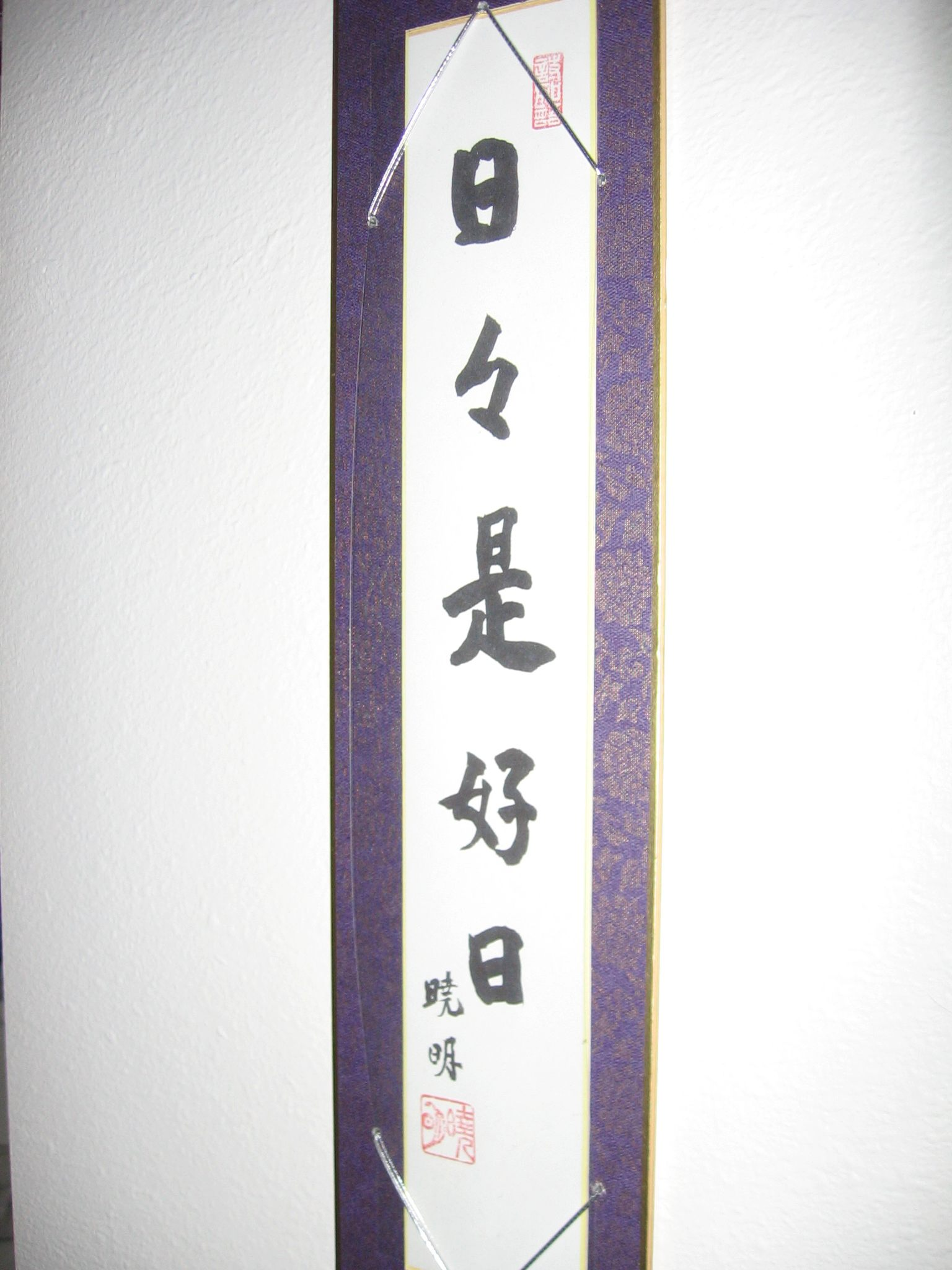
"Every day is a good day"

Nichinichi kore kōnichi (Japanese: 日々是好日) (Chinese: 日日是好日; pinyin: Rìrì shì hǎorì) is a Zen Buddhist proverb. It has been presented by some Zen masters (notably, Kōdō Sawaki and his disciple Taisen Deshimaru). It was a favorite saying of the avant-garde composer John Cage, featured in Song Books (1970) as "Solo for Voice 64". It is also known as Unmen's Good Days (雲門好日) and Unmen's 15 Days (雲門十五日).

== Context ==
The phrase comes from Yunmen Wenyan's answer in the sixth case of the kōan collection Blue Cliff Record.

舉雲門垂語云：「十五日已前不問汝，十五日已後道將一句來。」
Yunmen said, "I will not ask you anything before the fifteenth day. After the fifteenth day, tell me one sentence."

自代云：「日日是好日。」
He said to himself, "Every day is a good day."

== Readings ==
As a Zen word in Japanese, the correct way to read the phrase is Nichinichi kore kōnichi. It can also be read as Nichinichi kore kōjitsu and Hibi kore kōjitsu; there are also examples of it being read as Hibi kore kōnichi.

Nichinichi kore kōnichi literally translates to "every day is a good day", meaning "try to spend every day meaningfully".
