= Nihon Gaishi =

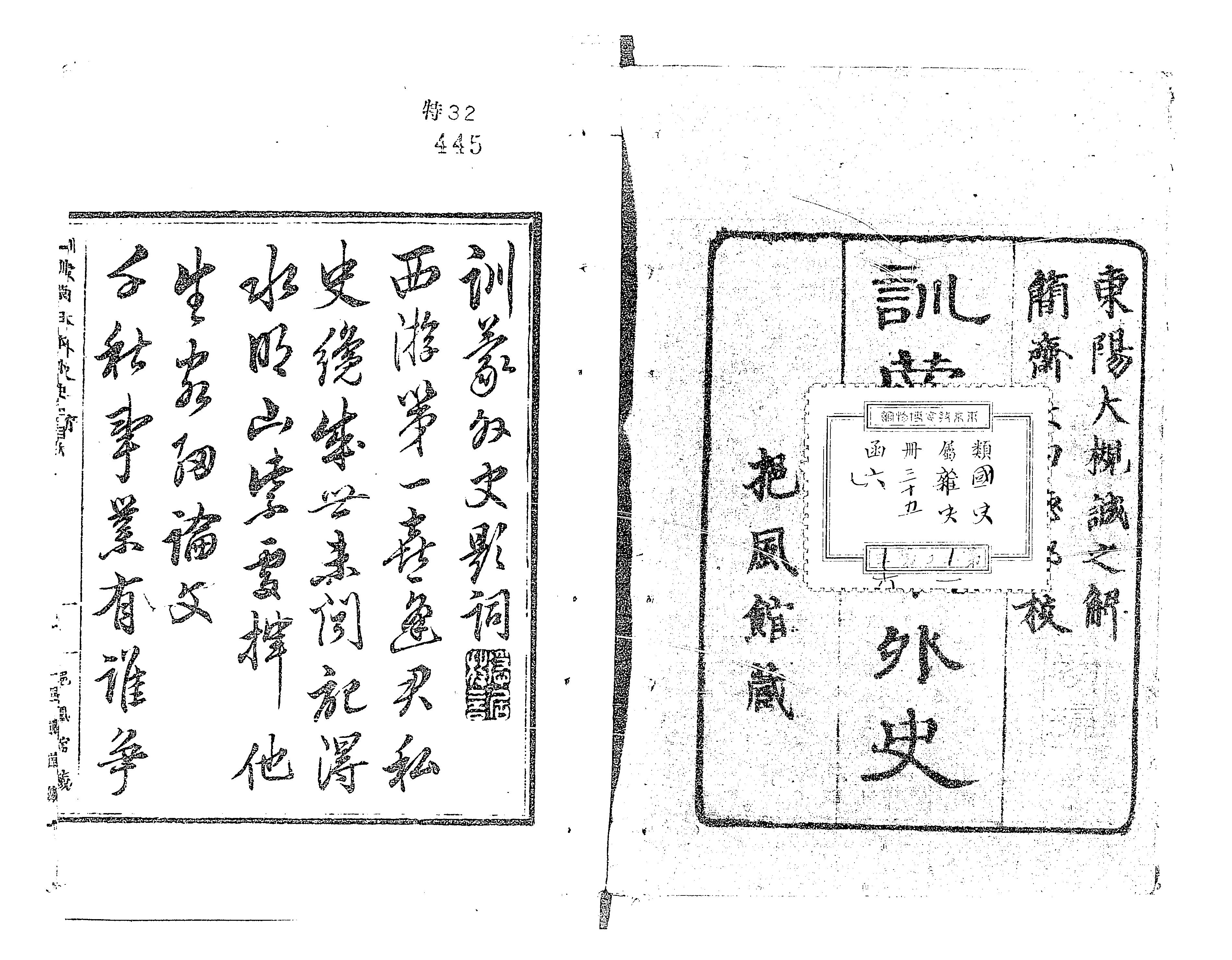
Title page from the 1874 edition

The Nihon Gaishi (日本外史) is a 19th-century book on the history of Japan by Rai San'yo. The whole work comprises 22 scrolls and covers samurai history from the Genpei War to the Edo period.
