= Tsuneko Akamatsu =

Japanese politician (1928–2021)

- 赤松 常子
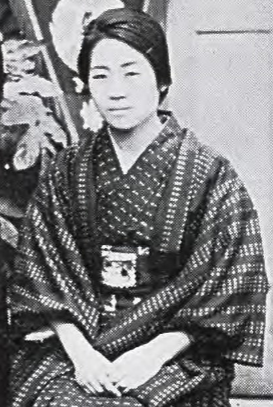
- Tsuneko Akamatsu in 1930

Member of the House of Councillors
- In office 3 May 1947 – 1 June 1965
- Preceded by: Constituency established
- Succeeded by: Multi-member district
- Constituency: National district

Personal details
- Born: 11 August 1897 Tokuyama, Yamaguchi, Japan
- Died: 21 July 1965 (aged 67) Nirayama, Shizuoka, Japan
- Party: Democratic Socialist (1960–1965)
- Other political affiliations: JSP (1947–1951; 1955–1960); RSP (1951–1955)
- Relatives: Katsumaro Akamatsu (brother); Renjō Akamatsu (grandfather)
- Education: Kyoto Women's University

Tsuneko Akamatsu (11 August 1897 – 21 July 1965) was a Japanese politician who served in the House of Councillors.

== Early life and education ==
Tsuneko Akamatsu was born in Tokuyama, Yamaguchi, on 11 August 1897, to Yasuko (died 1914) and Shōtō Akamatsu (died 1921), the high priest at Nishi Hongan-ji. Her grandfather, Renjō Akamatsu (1841–1919), also held the position of high priest at Nishi Hongan-ji. Three of her brothers became university professors. Her brother Katsumaro Akamatsu was elected to the House of Representatives in 1937, but purged from politics after World War II.

Akamatsu entered the Kyoto Women's University in 1913, and met Toyohiko Kagawa while attending it. She ended her education in order to focus on the socialist movement. In 1923, she moved to Tokyo and worked with Kagawa's relief efforts after the Great Kantō earthquake.

== Activism ==
The Japan General Federation of Labour (Sōdōmei) invited her to join its women's division in 1925, and was chief of the organization's Women's Department from 1934 to 1940. Ichikawa Fusae, Akamatsu, and Natsu Kawasaki formed the Women's Postwar Counter-Measures Committee on 25 August 1945, to push for women's suffrage. Akamatsu was a founding member of the Women's Democratic Club, an organization meant to promote female political participation, alongside Yoko Matsuoka, Setsuko Hani, Shidzue Katō, Miyamoto Yuriko, and others. Tanino Setsu and Akamatsu convinced Golda Stander, an American occupation officer, to require menstrual leave in Japanese law.

== Political career ==
Ten women won seats in the House of Councillors in the 1947 elections, including Akamatsu with the support of the Japan Socialist Party. She was reelected in 1953, and 1959. During her tenure in the House of Councillors she served as Parliamentary Vice-Minister of Health and Welfare in the Ashida Cabinet and chaired of the Labor Committee in 1950. She was a founding member of the Democratic Socialist Party in 1960.

Akamatsu was campaigning in Sendai in 1964, when she collapsed. She died in Nirayama, Shizuoka, in 1965.

== Works cited ==
=== Books ===
- The Japan Biographical Encyclopedia & Who's Who. Rengo Press. 1961.
- Beard, Mary (1953). The Forces of Women in Japanese History. Public Affairs Press.
- Beckmann, George M.; Okubo, Genji (1969). The Japanese Communist Party, 1922–1945. Stanford, CA: Stanford University Press. ISBN 978-0804706742.
- Colbert, Evelyn (1952). The Left Wing In Japanese Politics. Greenwood Publishing Group. ISBN 0837168805.
- Hopper, Helen (2004). Katô Shidzue: A Japanese Feminist. Longman. ISBN 0321078047.
- Kobayashi, Yoshie (2004). A Path Toward Gender Equality: State Feminism in Japan. Routledge. ISBN 041594788X.
- Shields, James (2017). Against Harmony: Progressive and Radical Buddhism in Modern Japan. Oxford University Press. ISBN 9780190675523.
- Takemae, Eiji (2003). The Allied Occupation of Japan. Continuum International Publishing Group. ISBN 0826462472.

=== Journals ===
- Akira, Kikuchi (2007). "赤松智城論ノオト : 徳応寺所蔵資料を中心に". Humanities Journal (94). The Kyoto University Research Centre for the Cultural Sciences: 1–35. doi:10.14989/71065.

=== Web ===
- "赤松常子、その人とあしあと". Japanese Federation of Textile, Chemical, Commerce, Food and General Services Workers' Unions. Archived from the original on 15 March 2025.
