= Yoko Matsuoka (writer) =

Japanese critic and translator (1916–1979)

- 松岡洋子
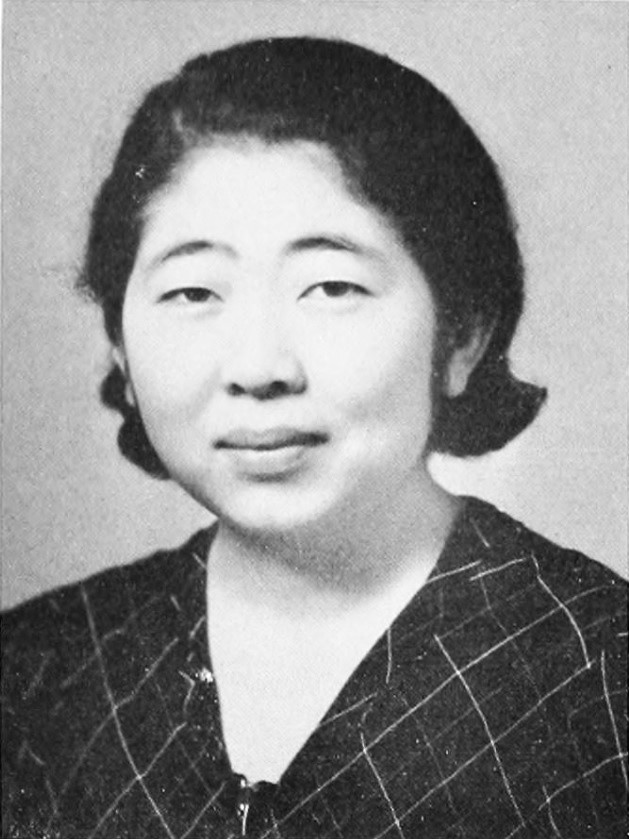
- Matsuoka, 1939
- Born: 20 April 1916; Tokyo, Japan
- Died: 7 December 1979 (aged 63); Tokyo, Japan
- Occupations: journalist, writer, translator, literary agent, activist
- Years active: 1937–1978

Yoko Matsuoka (松岡洋子, Matsuoka Yōko; 20 April 1916 – 7 December 1979) was a Japanese writer, literary agent, translator, and anti-war and women's rights activist. She was born in Tokyo and was educated in Japan and Korea before being sent to study in the United States in 1931, as a protest to the Asian Exclusion Act. She graduated from Shaker Heights High School in Cleveland, Ohio, in 1935 and earned a degree in political science from Swarthmore College in Pennsylvania in 1939. During her schooling, she became interested in international relations and was active in organizations which promoted peace and friendship. In the interwar era, she was active in the Pan-Pacific Women's Association and attended several youth conferences aimed at developing international cooperation. On her way home to Japan when World War II began, she began to examine the criticism leveled at Japan's militaristic policies.

During the war, Matsuoka worked at the International Cultural Association and then lectured at the Kokoumin-Seikatasu-Gakuin girls' school. Near the end of the war, she became an editor at the Japanese office of Reader's Digest and began working as an interpreter and translator for foreign correspondents, including Keyes Beech and Edgar Snow. Becoming a journalist and literary agent, she was disillusioned with policymakers and became openly critical of both the United States and Japan for their militarism. Matsuoka was a founding member of the Fujin Minshū Kurabu (Women's Democratic Association). She was elected as its first president in 1946 and served as editor-in-chief of the club's media organ, The Democratic Women's News. The club members actively opposed militarism and fought for socio-economic parity for women. The following year, she also became president of the women's auxiliary of the Japan Socialist Party. When her leftist associations began to impact her ability to publish, Matsuoka returned to the United States and completed graduate studies in foreign relations at Swarthmore and then at the Fletcher School of Law and Diplomacy between 1949 and 1952. In her last year in the US, she published her autobiography, Daughter of the Pacific.

Matsuoka served as an interpreter for Eleanor Roosevelt when she visited Japan in 1953. As a journalist and activist, Matsuoka visited more than twenty countries urging internationalist and anti-war policies. She translated many works of other writers and in 1956, she became secretary general of the Japan PEN Club. She was the permanent director of the Japan-China Friendship Association and was active in the fight to normalize diplomatic relations with China. She was an outspoken critic of the Cold War superpowers' interventionist and militaristic policies. She opposed the separation of North and South Korea, as well as North and South Vietnam and pressed for reunification. Matsuoka worked with women's groups to create pan-Asian solidarity and closer alliances between Japan and nations in the Global South. She was a prominent activist in the Women's Liberation Movement in Japan, known as ūman ribu, until her death in 1979.

== Early life and education ==
Yoko Matsuoka was born on 20 April 1916 in Tokyo, to Hisa and Masao Matsuoka, a journalist and university lecturer. Both of her parents had been educated in Japan and the United States and both descended from samurai families. Her father was the son of Totaro, a lawyer who had been adopted into the family of former-samurai Tadataka Matsuoka, when he married Tadataka's daughter Miwa. Totaro was disinherited when the couple divorced. Tadataka was a member of the Sho-Nanbu clan, whose members provided the horses for the Tokugawa shoguns and during the Meiji era lived as landed gentry in the Aomori Prefecture. Masao was the brother of Japan's first woman journalist, Motoko Hani, who employed Hisa upon her return from the United States in 1912 and introduced the couple. Hisa had studied at Wellesley College, and after working briefly at her sister-in-law's magazine, taught at the school Motoko founded. Hisa's family included a cousin, Tsuda Sen, who was one of the founders of Aoyama Gakuin, a Methodist educational institute. Matsuoka's parents were progressive and unorthodox, choosing not to believe in traditional superstitions. They ensured that all three of their daughters, Yoko, Kwoko, and Reiko, received higher education. The sisters were raised as Christians, although for significant celebrations, such as weddings or funerals, the family followed Shinto rites.

Although Matsuoka began her schooling in Tokyo, she lost half of her first year suffering from the measles. The family moved to Osaka in 1923, when her father was transferred with the newspaper Mainichi Shimbun. She was enrolled in the private school, Lark-Hill Primary, to enable her to catch up on her studies. The sisters also learned English at a Sunday school run by American missionaries. In 1927, Matsuoka's family moved to Seoul, Korea, when her father agreed to accept an appointment as vice president of the Japanese-government-run newspaper Keijō Nippō. The sisters were enrolled at the Nandaimon Primary School, a segregated institution which taught only Japanese pupils. During the two years she spent in Korea, Matsuoka became aware of the differences in living conditions between colonizers and colonized people. In 1929, she returned to Tokyo and enrolled in middle school at Jiyu Gakuen Girls' School, a private school which had been founded by her aunt, Motoko Hani. The school focused on teaching students to develop critical analysis, self-examination, and manage their own governance.

In 1924, when the Asian Exclusion Act was passed in the United States, Matsuoka's parents made the decision to send her to the United States to study by the time she turned sixteen. Her mother, in particular, saw her entry and study in the US as a way to protest the policy of arbitrarily excluding people. They began making preparations in 1931 for her to go to Cleveland, Ohio, with an American missionary, Bertha Starkey, the following year. Matsuoka first attended the Cleveland Preparatory School, an institution designed to help immigrants and adults gain the equivalent of a high school diploma, but within a few months transferred to the Shaker Heights High School. She graduated from Shaker Heights in 1935 and went on to earn a degree in political science from Swarthmore College in 1939.

== Early activism ==
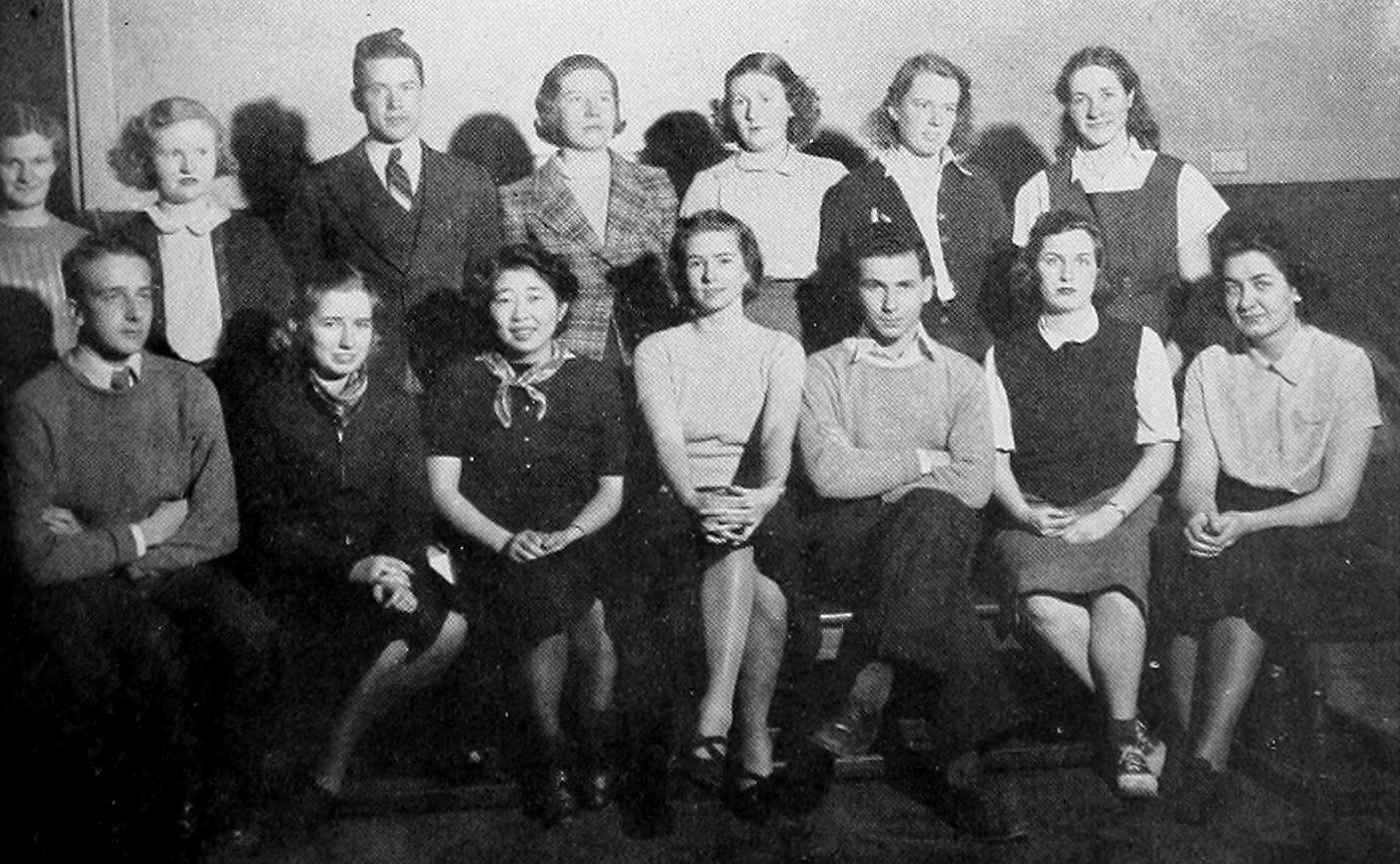
International Relations Club of Swarthmore College, 1940. Matsuoka is in the front row, third from the left.

During her university days, Matsuoka became interested in international relations and was one of the founders of the International Relations Club at Swarthmore, serving as its first president in 1937 and 1938. She was elected president of the Middle-Atlantic Inter-Collegiate Conference of International Relations Clubs in November 1937 and December 1938. In 1937, she met her mother in Vancouver, British Columbia, to attend the Pan-Pacific Women's Association Conference. The conference was designed to bring women's rights activists from the Pacific region together to work on social reforms and to foster peace through international understanding and acceptance. The following year, she attended the 1938 World Youth Congress, held at Vassar College in Poughkeepsie, New York, and was featured on the front page of the Honolulu Advertiser with Chinese student Pearl Teh-Wei Liu of Hong Kong as symbols of peace, in spite of their countries' ongoing war. After graduating in 1939, Matsuoka made her way home to Japan, after stopping in Amsterdam to attend the World Christian Youth Conference as a delegate of the Tokyo YWCA and touring Europe. The purpose of the conference was to discuss peace. Japan was the only one of the Axis powers that sent delegates to the gathering.

After leaving the conference, Matsuoka went to Freiburg, Germany, to visit a friend, before traveling to Geneva, Switzerland, to visit the League of Nations. While there, she visited an exhibition about the Japanese occupation of Manchuria. The tour of the League of Nations buildings and the exhibition caused her to question Japan's role in world affairs. After touring Venice, Rome, and Naples, Matsuoka boarded a ship for home on the day that Germany invaded Poland. Two days later Britain declared war on Germany. The changes the war brought were already visible as she sailed through the British ports at Colombo (now in Sri Lanka), Singapore, and Hong Kong, before arriving in Shanghai, where she witnessed the aggressive treatment towards Chinese people by the Japanese military. Confused by the criticism leveled at Japan on her journey home, upon reaching Tokyo, she questioned her father. He recommended that she travel through Manchuria and northern China to make her own decision. She was disturbed by the evidence of Japanese militancy that she encountered on her trip, but tried to justify the government's actions as stemming from security concerns.

== Career ==
=== Japan (1940–1948) ===
After her return, Matsuoka consulted with Count Aisuke Kabayama about finding a job that would allow her to promote world peace and international understanding. At his suggestion, she began working at the International Cultural Association in 1940, as a typist and mail clerk. In 1941, she married Takashi Ishigami, a journalist. She was unsure whether she was in love with him, but bowed to pressure from her cousins for an arranged marriage. Since the Matsuoka family had no sons to maintain their name, Ishigami agreed to take their surname when the couple married. Shortly after the wedding, Japan declared war upon the United States and Matsuoka resigned herself to hoping that after the conflict positive relationships could be restored. She resigned from her job in 1942 in anticipation of the birth of her daughter, Seiko. Five months later, she began working at the American Research Institute, but left in 1944, to become a lecturer on American government at the Kokoumin-Seikatasu-Gakuin girls' school. During the war, her husband Takashi served in Singapore and was taken prisoner by the British.

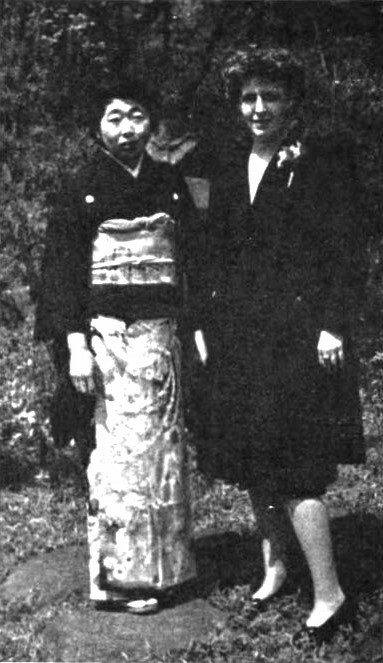
Matsuoka and Laura Brookman, 1946

Matsuoka, her mother, her sister Reiko, and daughter Seiko fled the bombings in Tokyo and spent the months prior to the surrender of Japan in Hanamaki. Upon notification of the approach of the U. S. Army, the police chief asked Matsuoka to serve as his interpreter. The family returned to Tokyo in September 1945, and she returned to the girls' school briefly. When offered a job at the Reader's Digest in November, Matsuoka began working at the Japanese editorial office, spending much of her time serving as an interpreter for foreign correspondents. She resigned from her position at the magazine and began working directly with writers including Edgar Snow of The Saturday Evening Post and Darrell "Berry" Berrigan of the New York Post. She also worked with Laura Lou Brookman, managing editor of the Ladies' Home Journal and Keyes Beech, a Pulitzer Prize-winning journalist who focused on Asia. Many of these journalists published articles analyzing Japan after the war and their experiences with Matsuoka and her family.

Initially, Matsuoka was happy with the reforms brought about by the American administrators, and even took her daughter with her to vote when women's suffrage was granted in 1946. That year, she joined with Tsuneko Akamatsu, Setsuko Hani, Shidzue Katō, Yuriko Miyamoto, Ineko Sata, Sugi Yamamoto, and Tamiko Yamamuro to found the Fujin minshû kurabu (Women's Democratic Club). The organization was a pacifist-feminist group aimed at developing a democratic and peaceful society. The goals of the club were to fight against traditional subordination of women, work for women's socio-economic independence, and to oppose militarism, specifically fighting against policies which mobilized women to support war. At their first meeting, Matsuoka was elected president, and was appointed as editor-in-chief of the club's media organ, The Democratic Women's News. She steered the group to maintain a left-leaning agenda by distancing the organization away from the increasingly conservative government. In 1947, she also became president of the Nihon fujin kaigai (Japan Women's Conference), the women's auxiliary of the Japan Socialist Party.

Matsuoka became disillusioned and unhappy with policymakers. Beech described her as a "confused liberal" because as an educated and intellectual woman, she discarded liberal philosophy and turned toward communism to combat the reactionary and militaristic policies which were instituted during the Reverse Course period of the US-led administration of Japan. She began to write articles for various magazines and newspapers, providing social criticism of government policies, which had shifted from reforming and democratizing Japan to reconstructing the economy and re-militarizing the country to be an ally to the West during the Cold War. In addition to writing and editing, she worked as a literary agent. Matsuoka was hired by John Hersey as his agent and translator for Hiroshima, but because of the war department censorship was unable to get permission for publication of her version. (Note: Historian Jeremy Treglown, in his biography of Hersey, identifies the first translator of Hiroshima as Yoko Matsuoka, later McClain (松岡陽子 1924–2011). In a 2008 interview, McClain stated that she worked after the war translating for American troops and that her English was not good. Other writers, such as Sally Hastings, have noted that the two women were sometimes misidentified, as both were born in Japan and educated in the United States.) The book was finally released in 1949, with different translators, Kinichi Ishikawa and Kiyoshi Tanimoto. Around the same time, Matsuoka's translation of Snow's The Chinese Labor Movement was also completed, but not allowed to be published.

In 1946, Matsuoka became one of the first Japanese journalists to have an article published in the United States after the war, when The Saturday Evening Post published a piece she had written on Japanese women. Her husband Takashi returned that year, but the couple had difficulty re-integrating their lives. They separated and divorced in 1948. That year, Matsuoka was invited by Brookman to spend a year in the United States. She agreed to go, leaving her daughter in the care of her mother. Her visa was delayed because Major Charles A. Willoughby had gathered a dossier on her leftist associations and his approval at an interview was necessary. Pressure from high-powered friends in the United States finally resulted in his clearing her to travel.

=== United States (1949–1952) ===
Matsuoka enrolled in graduate courses at Swarthmore in 1949, and the following year became the first Japanese woman to enroll at the Fletcher School of Law and Diplomacy to study foreign relations and diplomacy. During her studies, she often spoke at events for women's groups such as the Women's International League for Peace and Freedom, the Business and Professional Women's Clubs and the League of Women Voters. In 1952, she wrote an autobiography in English, Daughter of the Pacific. Reviewers praised the work, which according to Thomas M. Curran of America, a national Catholic weekly magazine, was a "sensitive study of the 'Oriental Mind'" and critically evaluated Japanese values in the pre- and post-war periods. William Heinemann wrote in The Adelaide Advertiser that Matsuoka's broad cultural experiences allowed her to contrast Western and Eastern thoughts on the war and occupation bringing insights to readers.

=== Japan (1953–1970) ===
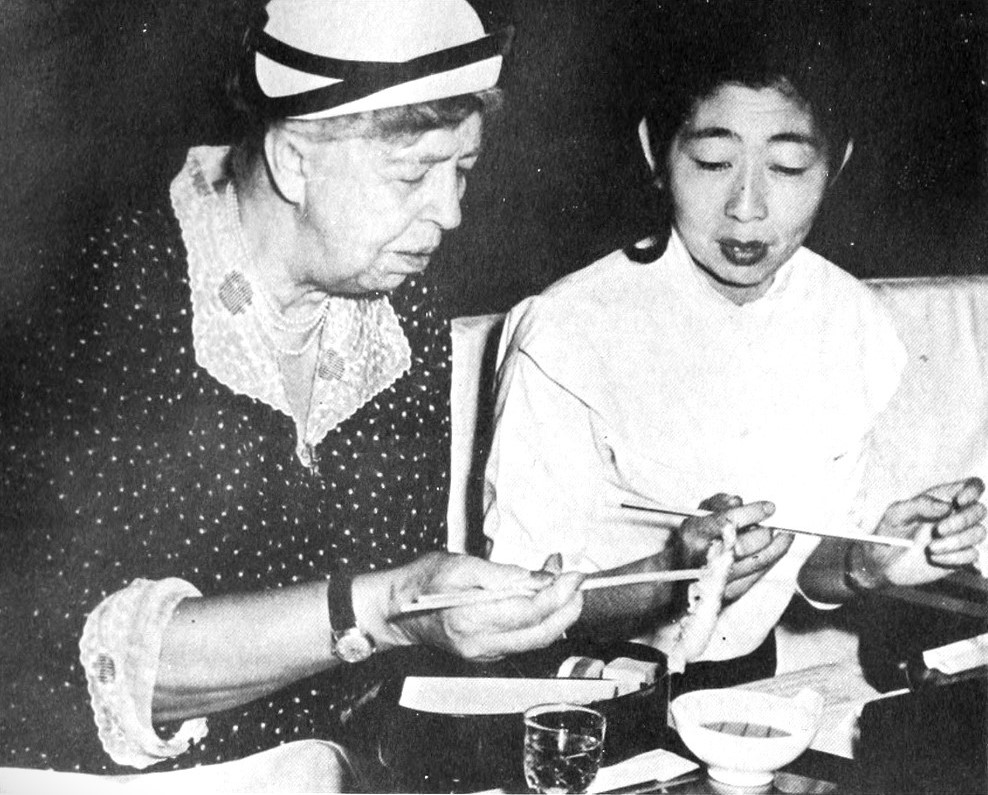
Eleanor Roosevelt lunches with Yoko Matsuoka, 1953

On completing her studies, Matsuoka returned to Japan where she served Eleanor Roosevelt as translator during her 1953 tour of the country. The two had previously met in 1938 at the Vassar youth conference. In 1956, she became the secretary general of the Nihon Pen Kurabu (Japan PEN Club), a literary club of poets and playwrights, editors and essayists, and novelists. The following year, she assisted in organizing the Tokyo congress of PEN International, the first international PEN congress ever held in Asia. Among the attendees were Hersey and John Steinbeck. Matsuoka became a member, and later permanent director, of the Nihon Chūgoku yūkō kyōkai (Japan-China Friendship Association). The association had formed in 1950 to protest the US policy of isolating China after the Communist Revolution, the occupation of Japan, and the Korean War. Matsuoko was strongly opposed to the Republic of Korea–Japan Talks, a US-backed series of negotiations that took place between 1951 and 1965 to enact a treaty normalizing the relationship between the two countries. She criticized both Japan and the United States for their plans to recognize South Korea, which she saw as an obstacle to unification with North Korea. She also pressed for restoration of diplomatic relations between China and Japan.

Matsuoko and Kenzo Nakajima, another writer, led an intellectual organization, Ampo Hihan no Kai (The Association for Criticizing the Security Treaty), founded in 1959. The association, whose membership was largely made up of artists, critics, performers, and writers, pressed for changes in the 1951 Security Treaty. The treaty required Japan to provide for its own defense, but the government interpretation of Article IX of the post-war constitution was that because armaments and war were forbidden, Japan could not defend itself or engage in war. Further, the treaty allowed the United States to indefinitely station troops in Japan for maintaining peace and security in Asia, but did not contain specific provisions for the US to defend Japan either internally or externally. Ostensibly the treaty was meant to curb the growth of Asian communism, but many Japanese saw it as a means of curtailing the country's sovereignty. Matsuoka and other activists protested and passed out flyers at major railway stations in Tokyo. In the wake of large scale demonstrations, the treaty was revised in 1960 to create more mutuality for Japan's defense and collaboration on the mobilization of military forces. Despite the gains made, Matsuoka continued throughout the 1960s and into the 1970s to protest the terms of the treaty and demand that all US military bases in Japan be dismantled.

Matsuoka gained a reputation as a critic of imperialist and militaristic policies, and in the 1960s the view that she was anti-American began limiting publication of her articles. Simultaneously, publishing houses in Japan began assigning translation work to writers who were more sympathetic to China, and Matsuoka was given responsibility for translating works of authors like Snow, for whom she had served as a literary agent since the 1950s. Writers Janice R. and Stephen R. MacKinnon and called her translation work "artfully rendered". In 1970, she resigned as secretary general of the Japan PEN Club in protest of the organizational support for the International PEN club hosting its convention in Seoul and the Asian Writer's Conference being hosted in Taipei.

Matsuoka urged closer alliances between Japan and nations in the Global South to prevent interference by either the US or the Soviet Union. She saw expansion of the Soviet Union across Eastern Europe, as well as its occupation of northern Japanese islands and patrols with warships in the Indian Ocean, as imperialistic and militaristic actions. (Note: The Kuril Islands of Etorofu, Habomai, Kunashiri, and Shikotan were taken as a war prize by the Soviet Union at the end of World War II. Enforcing their claim to the islands and waters around them, the USSR frequently seized Japanese fishing boats and detained fishermen operating in the area. In addition, a Soviet military base on Etorofu was seen as a threat to Japan's defense.) In 1961, Matsuoka was one of the twenty-six representatives of her country to attend the Afro-Asian Writers' Association Conference held in Tokyo. Attendees were divided over the themes of the conference – imperialism and militarization – with some writers thinking these were overly political. Other writers, such as Matsuoka, felt that focusing on the political environment could prompt serious debate and become a catalyst for change. Matsuoka attended the 1962 Tokyo conference "against atomic and hydrogen bombs and for prevention of nuclear war" and two years later was invited by the Vietnam Writer's Association to attend a reception in North Vietnam, hosted by the Commission for Cultural Relations with Foreign Countries. During her trip, she met with Ho Chi Minh to discuss the Vietnam War and efforts at reunification with South Vietnam.

=== Japan (1970–1979) ===
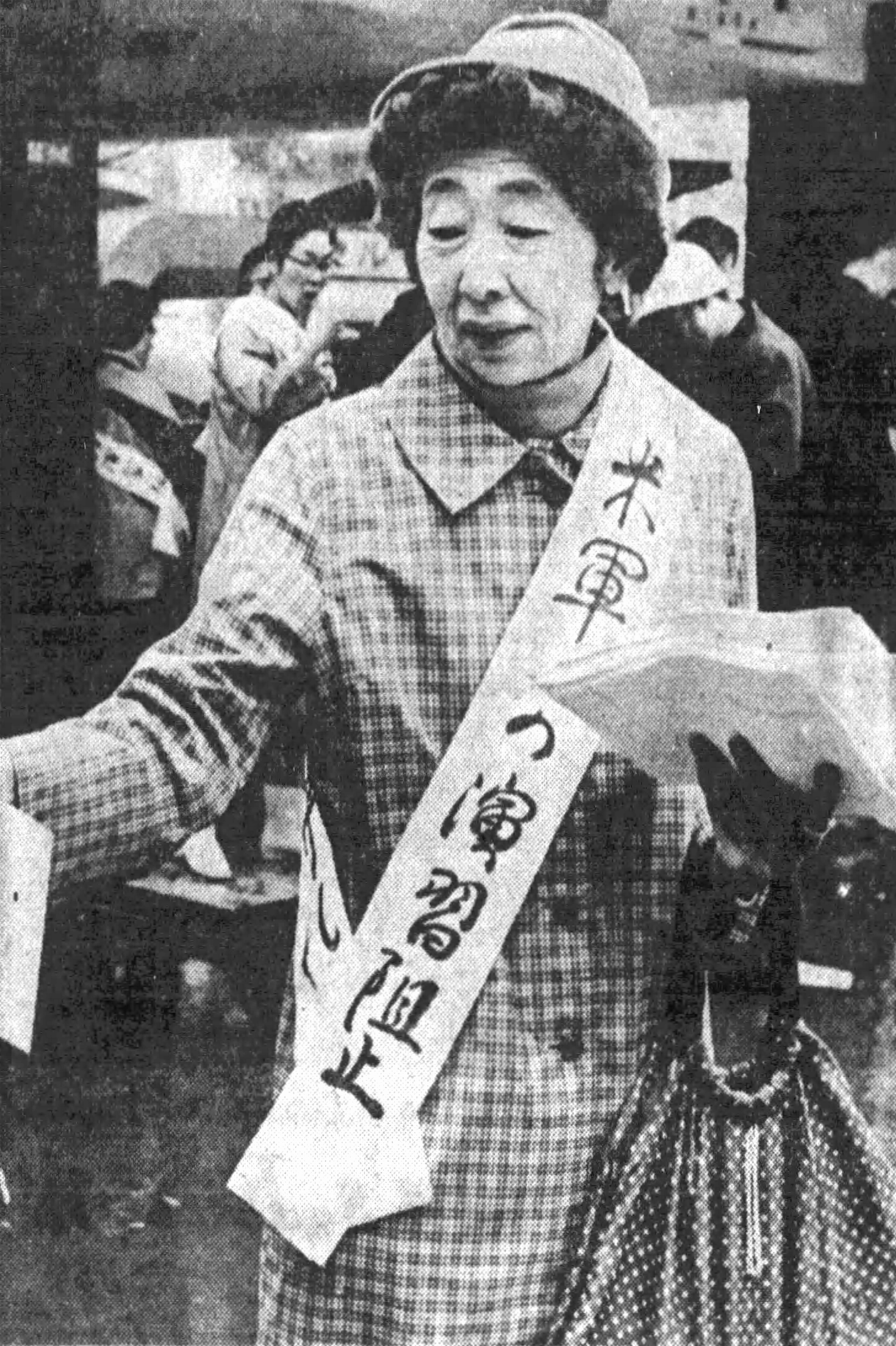
Yoko Matsuoka leads a women's rights protest in Tokyo, 1970

In 1970, Matsuoka and Aiko Iijima decided to host a conference to demonstrate their disagreement with Japanese aggression towards other Asians. They called the conference the Asian Women's Conference Fighting against Invasion=Discrimination. The gathering was held 22–23 August 1970 at Hosei University and was aimed at creating solidarity between pan-Asian women's groups. Each day of the conference over a thousand women attended. At the time, Matsuoka, who was still president of the Nihon fujin kaigai, was accused of being a radical and forced to resign from the organization. The conference marked the birth of the Women's Liberation Movement in Japan, known as ūman ribu. A critical component of the movement in Japan, as opposed to anti-discrimination and equality aims in the United States, was examination of how Asian people fought against imperialism and oppression and how women could create strategies to improve power imbalances. Matsuoka joined the Ajia Josei Kaihō (Asian Women's Liberation Group) along with Yayori Matsui and others. An article by John Roderick of the Associated Press featured a photograph and interpretation of Matsuoka's views. She reiterated that the biggest threat to women in Japan was continued militarization, as governments tended to see women's main role as the providers of troops for their conquests.

Matsuoka continued to protest throughout the 1970s about the presence of the US military in South Korea, Japan, and Vietnam. She denounced expansion of hostilities into Cambodia and Laos in 1971, noting that the spread of aggression was impacting the traditional unity of the Indochinese people. She criticized the governments of both Japan and the US for on-going militaristic policies in Asia and continued to fight for a treaty to foster peace and friendship with China, which was finally ratified in 1978. Fearful of Soviet policy toward Japan, she also saw the Soviet Union as a serious danger, citing its military expansion and expenditure, lack of compromise at the Helsinki Summit of 1975, intervention in Angola, and continuation of occupation of the islands of northern Japan. In 1978, Matsuoka took aim at US President Jimmy Carter for his failure to keep a campaign promise to withdraw troops from South Korea. That year she attended a women's conference in Beijing, one of numerous visits she had made over the decade, sometimes accompanied by her daughter. In the early part of the following year, she spoke out about ongoing hostilities and the failure of the Vietnamese combatants to work for peace.

== Death and legacy ==
Matsuoka died on 7 December 1979, in Tokyo from lung cancer. She was remembered for her internationalism and efforts to promote friendly relationships between Japan and other nations. She was an unusual Japanese woman in her era in that she was highly educated and internationally engaged. Over the course of her career, she visited more than twenty countries, including seven trips to China and three to North Vietnam. During her lifetime, she was regarded as one of the leading women in Japan, and a fierce critic of imperialism and militarism. She believed that societal change could only be attained through serious analysis and discussion of political actions.

== Selected works ==
- Matsuoka, Yoko (8 June 1946). "Japanese Women Try a New Puzzle". The Saturday Evening Post. Vol. 218, no. 49. Philadelphia, Pennsylvania: Curtis Publishing Company. pp. 17, 149–150. ISSN 0048-9239.
- Matsuoka, Yoko (1952). Daughter of the Pacific (1st ed.). New York, New York: Harper & Brothers. OCLC 413258.
- Matsuoka, Yoko (1953). 世界の小学生たち [Elementary School Students around the World] (in Japanese). Tokyo: Wakōsha. OCLC 33622127.
- Rama Rau, Santha (1955). インドの顔 [This is India] (in Japanese). Translated by Matsuoka, Yoko. Tokyo: Shinchōsha. OCLC 33606895.
- Matsuoka, Yoko (1958). 世界の女性 [Women of the World] (in Japanese). Tokyo: Dainihon Yūbenkai Kōdansha. OCLC 47589344.
- Matsuoka, Yoko (July 1960). "Gijidō o Kakonda Hito no Nami" [The Wave of People that Surrounded the Diet]. Sekai (in Japanese). Tokyo: Iwanami Shoten. pp. 44–45. ISSN 0582-4532.
- Matsuoka, Yoko (September 1961). "Yureru Shakai to Yuruganu Shihyō" [Wavering Society and an Unwavering Barometer]. Gendai no me (in Japanese). Vol. 2, no. 9. Tokyo: Gendai Hyōronsha. pp. 24–28. ISSN 0435-219X.
- Snow, Edgar (1963). 今日の中国: もうひとつの世界 [The Other Side of the River: Red China Today] (in Japanese). Translated by Matsuoka, Yoko. Tokyo: Chikuma Shobō. OCLC 743387094.
- Snow, Edgar (1963). 目覚めへの旅 [Journey to the Beginning] (in Japanese). Translated by Matsuoka, Yoko. Tokyo: Kinokuniya Bookstore. OCLC 743387094.
- Matsuoka, Yoko (12 October 1965). "North Vietnam As I Saw It Again: The Bridge of Ham Rong in the War". Ekonomisuto. Tokyo: Mainichi Shinbunsha. ISSN 0013-0621. (7 pages)
- Snow, Edgar (1968). 北京・ワシントン・ハノイ: 日本で考えたこと [Peking, Washington, Hanoi: What I Thought about in Japan] (in Japanese). Translated by Matsuoka, Yoko. Tokyo: Asahi Shinbunsha. OCLC 122975638.
- Matsuoka, Yoko (1970). ベトナム・アメリカ・安保 [Vietnam, America, and Security] (in Japanese). Tokyo: Tabata Shoten. OCLC 26580276.
- Han, Suyin (1971). 中国の目・アジアの目 [Eyes of China, Eyes of Asia] (in Japanese). Translated by Matsuoka, Yoko. Tokyo: Asahi Shinbunsha. OCLC 42410143.
- Snow, Edgar (1972). 革命、そして革命 [The Long Revolution] (in Japanese). Translated by Matsuoka, Yoko. Tokyo: Asahi Shinbunsha. OCLC 663644935.
- Snow, Edgar (1972). 中国の赤い星 [Red Star Over China] (in Japanese). Translated by Matsuoka, Yoko (Revised ed.). Tokyo: Chikuma Shobō. OCLC 1183211969.
- Snow, Edgar (1972–1974). エドガー・スノー著作集 [Collected Works of Edgar Snow] (in Japanese). Vol. 2, 4–7. Translated by Matsuoka, Yoko. Tokyo: Chikuma Shobō. OCLC 835058011. (2, ), (4, OCLC 835058074), (5, OCLC 835058106), (6, OCLC 835058156), (7, OCLC 835058190).
- Han, Suyin (1973). 毛沢東 [The Morning Deluge] (in Japanese). Translated by Matsuoka, Yoko. Tokyo: Mainichi Shinbunsha. OCLC 33549920.
- Snow, Edgar (1974). 革命はつづく [The Revolution Continues] (in Japanese). Translated by Matsuoka, Yoko. Tokyo: Chikuma Shobō. OCLC 33557912.
- Matsuoka, Yoko (1976). 第三次世界大戦争は起る [World War III Will Occur] (in Japanese). Tokyo: Matsuoka Jimusho. OCLC 259241672.
