= Yoko Matsuoka =

Yoko Matsuoka may refer to:

- Yōko Matsuoka (active 1973-), Japanese actress
- Yoko Matsuoka (writer) (1916-1979), Japanese writer and activist
- Yoko Matsuoka McClain (1924-2011), Japan-born American scholar
- Yoky Matsuoka (born c.1972), Japan-born roboticist
