= Fujin no Tomo =

Japanese women's magazine

- Former editors: Hani Motoko
- Categories: Women's magazine
- Frequency: Monthly
- Founder: Hani Motoko; Yoshikazu Motoko
- Founded: 1903
- Country: Japan
- Based in: Tokyo
- Language: Japanese
- Website: Fujin no Tomo

Fujin no Tomo (Japanese: 婦人之友; The Women’s Friend) is a monthly women's magazine targeting housewives which has been in circulation since 1903. The magazine is headquartered in Tokyo, Japan.

== History and profile ==
The magazine was founded in 1903 by Yoshikazu and Hani Motoko, under the name Katei no Tomo (Japanese: The Family Friend). In 1908 it was renamed as Fujin no Tomo. Hani Motoko also served as the editor-in-chief of the magazine which targets housewives. The readers were primarily the middle-class women living in the newly established urban centres. The original goal was to make the status of women much better which reflected the Christian liberal views of the magazine founder Hani Motoko. The magazine has mostly covered articles which aim to provide practical help them in daily life. It has also published annual accounting book for families which introduced accounting to the modern Japanese families.

Abe Isoo was among the contributors of Fujin no Tomo which is published on a monthly basis.
