= Sōdōmei =

Japanese trade union federation (1919–1940)

Nihon Rōdō Sōdōmei
- Japan General Federation of Labor
- 日本労働総同盟
- Abbreviation: Sōdōmei
- Predecessor: Yūaikai
- Merged into: Sangyō Hōkoku Undō
- Formation: August 1919
- Dissolved: 21 July 1940
- Type: Trade union federation
- Headquarters: Tokyo, Japan
- Members: 96,926 (1936)
- Key people: Suzuki Bunji; Matsuoka Komakichi; Nishio Suehiro; Asō Hisashi; Akamatsu Katsumaro
- Publication: Rōdō (Labor)
- Affiliations: Shakai Minshūtō (1926–1932); Socialist Mass Party (1932–1940)

The Japan General Federation of Labor (Japanese: 日本労働総同盟, romanized: Nihon Rōdō Sōdōmei), or Sōdōmei for short, was the most significant federation of trade unions in interwar Japan. Founded in 1919 as an outgrowth of the cooperative Yūaikai ("Friendly Society"), the Sōdōmei evolved into the dominant force in the moderate, reformist wing of the Japanese labor movement. Throughout its history, it navigated a complex political landscape, shifting its ideology from cooperative business unionism to a politically engaged "realist socialism" in the 1920s, and later retreating to a defensive, non-political "sound unionism" amidst the Great Depression and rising militarism of the 1930s.

The Sōdōmei's history was marked by intense internal and external conflicts. In its early years, it fought ideological battles against anarchist and syndicalist factions, affirming a commitment to parliamentary politics and centralized organization. A more significant and lasting struggle emerged with the rise of the Japanese Communist Party in the early 1920s. This conflict culminated in the 1925 split, when the federation expelled its communist-led unions, which then formed the rival, left-wing Hyōgikai (Council of Japanese Labor Unions). The subsequent rivalry between the moderate Sōdōmei and the militant Hyōgikai defined the Japanese labor movement for the remainder of the decade.

The Sōdōmei was instrumental in the establishment of the pre-war Japanese socialist party movement, providing the primary organizational and financial base for the right-wing Social Democratic Party and its successor, the Socialist Mass Party. However, as the political climate grew more repressive in the 1930s, the federation's leadership prioritized the institutional survival of its unions over its socialist political objectives. This retreat from politics, combined with the pressures of wartime mobilization, weakened the organization. After a series of internal schisms and mass defections by its member unions to the state-sponsored Sangyō Hōkoku Undō (Sampo, Industrial Patriotic Movement), the Sōdōmei was voluntarily dissolved in July 1940, marking the end of the autonomous labor movement in pre-war Japan.

== Origins as the Yūaikai (1912–1919) ==
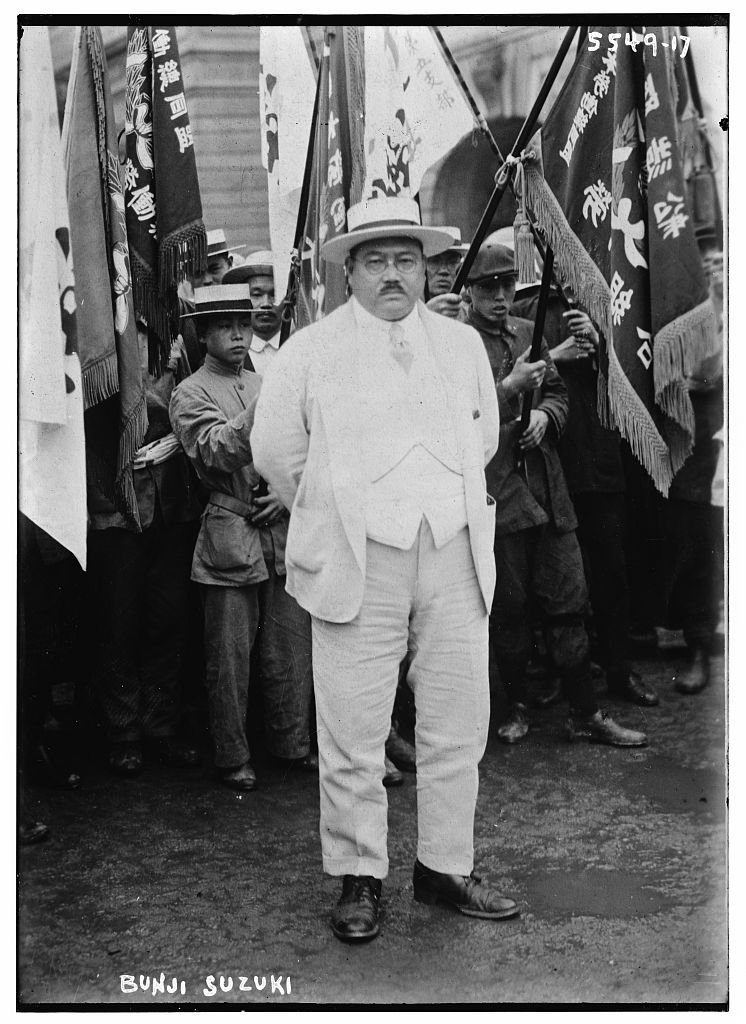
Suzuki Bunji

The Sōdōmei originated as the Yūaikai (Friendly Society), a labor organization founded in Tokyo in August 1912 by the Christian intellectual Suzuki Bunji. Initially, the Yūaikai was a cautious and moderate organization, focused on "mutual aid in friendship and cooperation", worker education, and moral improvement rather than political confrontation. Its primary mission was the promotion of "sound" labor unions modeled on the conservative, non-political American Federation of Labor. Despite its mild aims, the Yūaikai experienced spectacular growth, expanding from 15 members at its founding to over 30,000 by 1919. This growth was fueled by Japan's rapid wartime industrialization during World War I, which expanded the industrial workforce, and a new flexibility among some employers and government-advising bodies like the Shakai Seisaku Gakkai (Social Policy Association), who saw moderate unions as a potential way to stabilize labor relations.

The economic boom of World War I did not significantly benefit workers, whose real wages fell due to sharp inflation, leading to an unprecedented wave of labor strikes. Although the Yūaikai did not officially lead these strikes, it benefited from the upsurge of worker protest by recruiting members who saw it as a vehicle for their interests. The Yūaikai's leadership, particularly Suzuki, focused on recruiting skilled male workers (oyakata), who often brought their crews of subordinate workers (kokata) with them into the union, a strategy exemplified by the recruitment of prominent lathe worker Matsuoka Komakichi.

Towards the end of the war, the Yūaikai underwent a sharp political awakening. This shift was driven by several factors: the liberal democratic ideals associated with the victorious Allied powers, championed in Japan by figures like Yoshino Sakuzō; the inspiration of the 1917 Russian Revolution; the 1918 Rice Riots in Japan, which suggested a rising revolutionary potential among the masses; and growing demands from within the Yūaikai for more political action and internal democracy. Worker-led branches in the Kansai region formed the Kansai Rōdō Dōmeikai (Kansai Labor Federation) in 1919, demanding that the national leadership campaign for universal suffrage and the repeal of the anti-labor provisions of the 1900 Peace Police Law. This push was supported by a new wave of university-educated intellectuals from groups like the Shinjinkai ("New Man Society"), including Asō Hisashi and Akamatsu Katsumaro, who joined the Yūaikai to promote the "democratic reconstruction" of Japan.

== Transformation and conflict with anarchism (1919–1923) ==
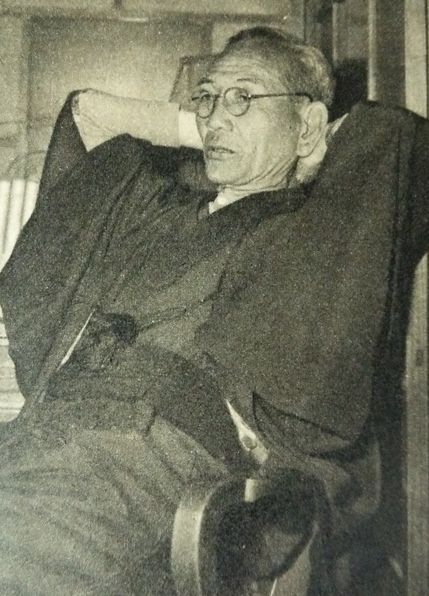
Matsuoka Komakichi

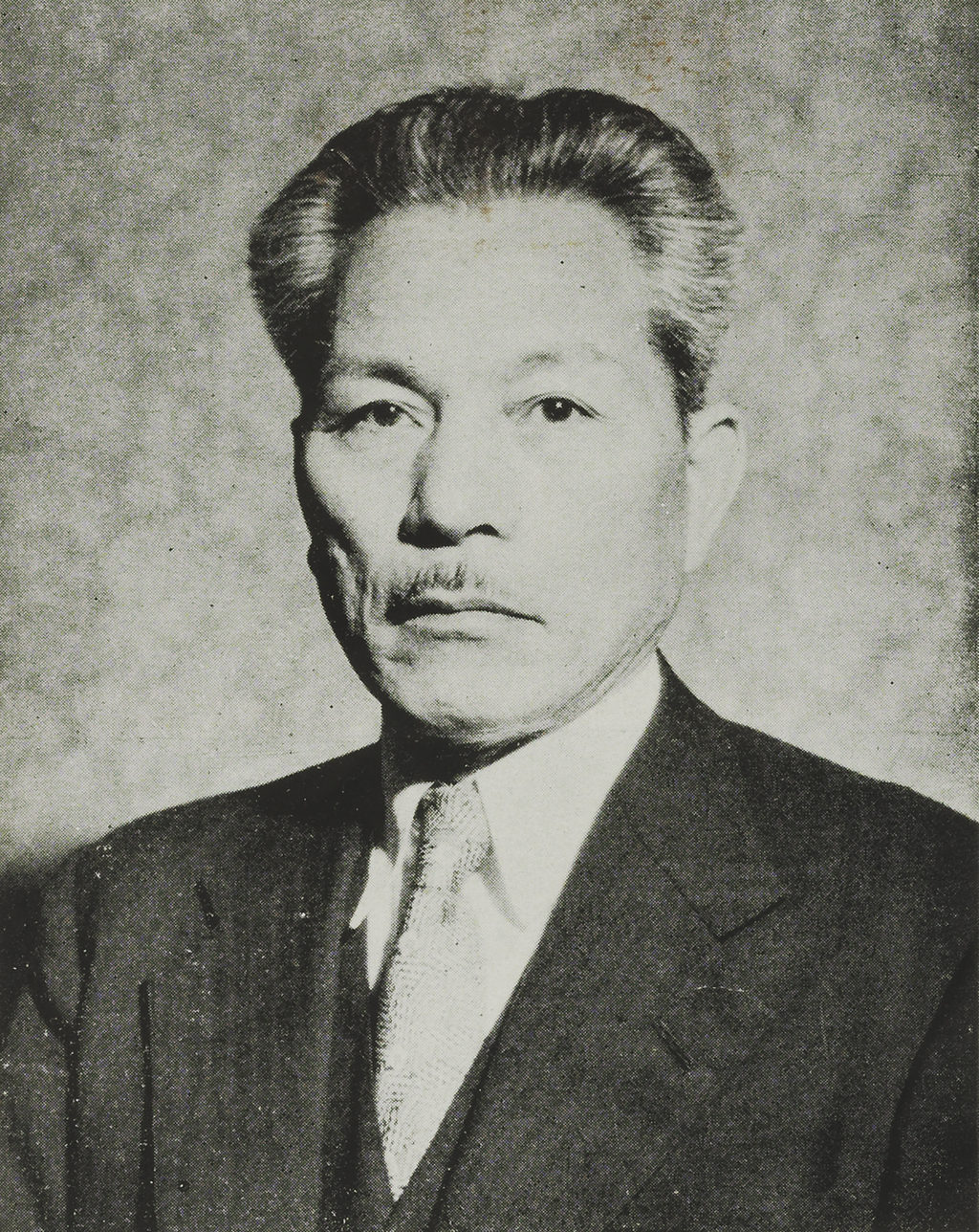
Nishio Suehiro

At its annual convention in August 1919, the Yūaikai was transformed in response to these internal and external pressures. The organization was renamed the Dai Nihon Rōdō Sōdōmei-Yūaikai (Friendly Society Greater Japan General Federation of Labor) to symbolize its new, more aggressive identity. A new leadership structure was created, replacing Suzuki's autocratic rule with a central executive committee where power was balanced between worker-leaders like Matsuoka Komakichi and Nishio Suehiro, and intellectuals led by Asō Hisashi. The convention adopted a new declaration of principles, written by the Christian socialist Kagawa Toyohiko, which proclaimed that "Workers are people with personalities. They are not to be bought and sold with wages" and declared a struggle to "rid the world of the evils of capitalism". Its platform was a comprehensive list of political and economic demands, including the right to unionize, a minimum wage, the eight-hour day, and universal suffrage, closely mirroring the standards of the newly formed International Labour Organization (ILO). The organization's name was simplified to Nihon Rōdō Sōdōmei in 1921.

This new political orientation immediately brought the Sōdōmei into conflict with a rising tide of anarchism and anarcho-syndicalism within the labor movement, which rejected parliamentary politics and advocated "direct action" to overthrow the state. This ideological battle dominated the Sōdōmei's early years. At the 1920 national convention, anarchist delegates clashed fiercely with the socialist leadership over the federation's core principles. The anarchists demanded that the Sōdōmei abandon its support for universal suffrage in favor of direct action, such as a general strike, and that it adopt a decentralized structure (jiyū rengō) instead of a centralized one (gōdō rengō). The Sōdōmei leadership, arguing that a general strike was premature and that centralized authority was necessary for an effective movement, successfully defeated the anarchist proposals. This victory firmly established the Sōdōmei's identity as a reformist socialist organization committed to gradual, legal, and evolutionary change. The conflict continued into the early 1920s, particularly in the Kantō region, but the influence of anarchism waned as the post-war recession and rising unemployment made workers reluctant to engage in militant direct action.

== Communist offensive and 1925 split ==
Following the decline of anarchism, a new and more formidable challenge to the Sōdōmei's leadership emerged from the Japanese Communist Party (JCP), founded in July 1922. Many former anarchists, including the influential theorist Yamakawa Hitoshi, were drawn to communism, believing it offered a more practical and disciplined path to revolution. The JCP's strategy, guided by the Comintern, was to form a temporary "alliance" with the moderate socialists of the Sōdōmei to destroy the anarchists, while simultaneously infiltrating the federation from below with the ultimate goal of taking it over.

This uneasy socialist-communist cooperation was shattered by the aftermath of the 1923 Great Kantō earthquake. The government used the disaster as a pretext for a massive crackdown on radicals, arresting and killing many communists and anarchists. This "white terror" convinced the Sōdōmei leadership that any association with the communists was dangerously provocative and would invite government repression. Simultaneously, the government began offering "candy" in the form of progressive labor legislation, such as the 1922 Health Insurance Law and amendments to the Factory Law, signaling that it would cooperate with moderate labor groups if they rejected radicalism.

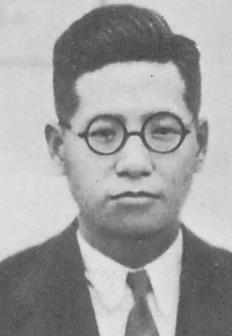
Akamatsu Katsumaro

In response to these pressures, the Sōdōmei executed a "change of direction" (hōkō no tenkan) at its 1924 convention. It adopted a new ideology of "realist socialism" (genjitsuteki na shakaishugi), formulated by the recently converted anti-communist Akamatsu Katsumaro. Realist socialism rejected violent class struggle and Comintern-led revolution in favor of legal, evolutionary reform through a parliamentary party, and blended this with a nationalist emphasis on adapting socialism to Japan's unique cultural traditions, including the Emperor system.

Despite this clear anti-communist turn, JCP-aligned members within the Sōdōmei, led by the charismatic organizer Watanabe Masanosuke, continued their infiltration efforts. In 1924, they successfully took control of the powerful Kantō Iron Workers' Union and used it to launch attacks on the Sōdōmei leadership, whom they accused of betraying the working class. The escalating conflict created intense pressure from anti-communist unions within the Sōdōmei, particularly in the Kantō Federation, for the expulsion of the communists. After months of internal debate and failed attempts at compromise, the Sōdōmei central committee announced in May 1925 the expulsion of all communist unions and individuals, totaling over 3,000 members. The expelled unions immediately formed a new, rival federation, the Nihon Rōdō Kumiai Hyōgikai (Council of Japanese Labor Unions), which was nearly as large as the Sōdōmei itself. This event, known as the dai-ichiji bunretsu (first great split), divided the Japanese labor movement into competing moderate and radical camps, a division that would define its politics for the next decade.

== Rivalry and political engagement (1925–1929) ==
From 1925 until the Hyōgikai's dissolution by the government in 1928, the Japanese labor movement was characterized by the intense rivalry between the Sōdōmei and its communist-led counterpart. This conflict played out in the factories against a backdrop of "industrial paternalism," where large enterprises sought to secure worker loyalty through institutions like lifetime employment and seniority-based wages (the nenkō system), making it difficult for either federation to organize. The Sōdōmei adapted by promoting "sound unionism" (kenjitsuteki na kumiaishugi), focusing on pragmatic goals like negotiating for better wages and working conditions, establishing welfare programs, and building stable enterprise-based unions. In contrast, the Hyōgikai championed militant class struggle, organizing frequent and often confrontational strikes which it viewed as opportunities to raise the revolutionary consciousness of workers.

The passage of the Universal Manhood Suffrage Act in 1925 opened a new arena for this rivalry: parliamentary politics. Both federations became deeply involved in the creation of proletarian political parties, transferring their ideological conflicts into the new movement. In late 1925, attempts to form a single united socialist party collapsed due to the Sōdōmei's refusal to cooperate with the Hyōgikai and other groups it deemed communist fronts. This led to the fragmentation of the socialist movement. The Sōdōmei became the main organizational pillar of the Shakai Minshūtō (Social Democratic Party), a moderate right-wing party founded in December 1926. It was opposed by the left-wing Rōdō Nōmintō (Labor-Farmer Party), supported by the Hyōgikai, and the centrist Nihon Rōnōtō (Japan Labor-Farmer Party), led by Asō Hisashi after he split from the Sōdōmei leadership.

The Sōdōmei and the Shakai Minshūtō developed a close, symbiotic relationship. The federation provided the party with its core membership, campaign funds, and electoral strategy, while the party gave the Sōdōmei a political voice in the National Diet. This articulation was demonstrated during the Great Noda Soy Sauce Strike of 1927–28, where Shakai Minshūtō Diet members publicized the Sōdōmei-led strike and criticized the government's pro-business stance. In the first general election under universal suffrage in 1928, the Shakai Minshūtō won four seats, two of which went to Sōdōmei leaders Suzuki Bunji and Nishio Suehiro, establishing a small but visible socialist presence in the Diet.

== Retreat from politics and dissolution (1929–1940) ==
The onset of the Great Depression and the rise of militarism following the 1931 Manchurian Incident dramatically altered Japan's political environment, placing the Sōdōmei and the socialist movement on the defensive. The Sōdōmei's leadership, particularly Matsuoka Komakichi, who succeeded Suzuki Bunji as the federation's effective leader in 1931, concluded that in the face of economic crisis and a growing ultranationalist right wing, the pursuit of socialist politics was a "luxury that the labor movement could no longer afford". The federation's overriding priority shifted from political reform to the simple institutional survival of its unions.

This "retreat from socialism" was manifested in several ways. The Sōdōmei's rhetoric and activities became increasingly focused on non-political "sound unionism" and industrial cooperation (sangyō kyōryoku) with business and government to overcome the national crisis. In its response to the Manchurian Incident, the federation abandoned its anti-imperialist stance and offered tacit patriotic support for Japan's actions in China. While still formally allied with the Socialist Mass Party (Shakai Taishūtō, formed in 1932 by a merger of the Shakai Minshūtō and other groups), the Sōdōmei's support became lukewarm, as it prioritized narrow union issues over the party's broader socialist goals. This political "becalming" was briefly interrupted by the 26 February Incident of 1936, which shocked the Sōdōmei leadership into a temporary revitalization of its anti-fascist political engagement in support of the Socialist Mass Party in the 1937 elections.

The outbreak of the Second Sino-Japanese War in July 1937 ended this revival. Swept up in a wave of patriotism, the Sōdōmei fully embraced the war effort. At its October 1937 convention, the federation passed resolutions of thanks to the Imperial Japanese Army, renounced the right to strike for the duration of the conflict, and launched a "Home Front Campaign" to support the war. This patriotic turn, however, could not save the labor movement from the government's drive to create a "New Order". In 1938, the government launched the Sangyō Hōkoku Undō (Sampo, Industrial Patriotic Movement), a nationwide network of factory-based "patriotic societies" intended to harmonize labor-management relations and maximize wartime production.

Though not initially compulsory, Sampo proved irresistibly attractive to workers, who saw it as a government-backed vehicle for job security and improved conditions. The Sōdōmei leadership was caught in a dilemma: opposing Sampo was unpatriotic, but cooperation threatened the existence of the unions. The Sōdōmei's remaining political allies in the Nichirōkei faction of the Socialist Mass Party, led by Asō Hisashi, embraced the New Order and called for the dissolution of all existing parties and unions into new national-front organizations. This led to a final split in the Sōdōmei in 1939, as the Nichirōkei unions broke away. Facing mass defections of its remaining unions to Sampo and intense pressure from the government, the Sōdōmei leadership finally conceded defeat. On 21 July 1940, the Japan General Federation of Labor was voluntarily dissolved, ending the history of the independent labor movement in pre-war Japan.

== Legacy ==
According to historian Stephen S. Large, the story of the Sōdōmei and the interwar labor movement is one of "general failure". The movement failed to achieve its most important objectives, such as obtaining legal sanction for unions or preventing the rise of militarism, and was ultimately unable to save itself from destruction. Its weakness was a product of both external constraints and internal dynamics. It emerged too late in Japan's industrialization to build a strong institutional base before being confronted with the sophisticated "industrial paternalism" of large enterprises, which stifled union growth. This contrasted with the experience of labor in Britain and Germany, where unions were well-established before facing similar challenges.

Internally, the Sōdōmei's leaders, whom Large describes as "cautious custodians of the unions," prioritized institutional survival over political risk-taking. Their retreat from socialist politics in the 1930s left the movement "becalmed, drifting toward the whirlpool of the New Order". This conservatism was reinforced by the rank-and-file members, who were motivated more by immediate concerns for wages and security—a "factory consciousness"—than by abstract socialist ideology. Lacking a strong, independent political vision, the Sōdōmei was rendered vulnerable to co-optation and ultimately became a "docile handmaiden of the New Order" before its final dissolution into Sampo, which Large calls the "final graveyard for the labor movement in 1940".
