= Katsumaro Akamatsu =

Japanese politician (1894–1955)

- 赤松 克麿
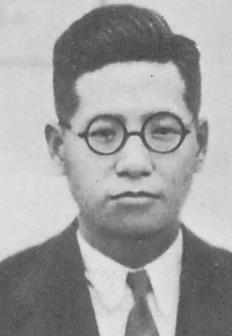

Member of the House of Representatives
- In office 30 April 1937 – 29 April 1942
- Preceded by: Junsuke Itaya
- Succeeded by: Tokuo Nanjō
- Constituency: Hokkaido 4th

Personal details
- Born: 4 December 1894 Tokuyama, Yamaguchi, Japan
- Died: 13 December 1955 (aged 61) Musashino, Tokyo, Japan
- Party: Imperial Rule Assistance Association (1940–1945)
- Other political affiliations: Communist (1922–1926); Social Democratic (1926–1932); National Socialist (1932–1933); Nationalist Society (1933–1937); Renovation (1937–1940)
- Spouse: Akiko Yoshino
- Relatives: Tsuneko Akamatsu (sister); Sakuzō Yoshino (father-in-law); Renjō Akamatsu (grandfather)
- Education: Tokyo Imperial University

Japanese name
- Kanji: 赤松 克麿
- Kana: あかまつ かつまろ
Transcriptions
- Romanization: Akamatsu Katsumaro

Katsumaro Akamatsu (Japanese: 赤松 克麿, Hepburn: Akamatsu Katsumaro; 4 December 1894 – 13 December 1955) was a Japanese politician who served in the House of Councillors for Hokkaido 4th district from 1937 to 1942. Initially a left-winger and member of the Japanese Communist Party (JCP), he shifted to the right and embraced fascism.

Born in Tokuyama, Yamaguchi, as the son and grandson of high priests, Akamatsu was educated at Tokyo Imperial University and studied under Sakuzō Yoshino. After graduation he became involved in the Japanese Federation of Labour and became chief of its political bureau.

Akamatsu was a founding member of the JCP, but left to join the Social Democratic Party. He rose to become secretary-general of the party, but left due to his support of Japan's actions during the Mukden incident. Tatsuo Tsukui and Akamatsu formed multiple nationalist and fascist parties before joining the Imperial Rule Assistance Association.

== Early life ==
Katsumaro Akamatsu was born in Tokuyama, Yamaguchi, on 4 December 1894, to Yasuko and Shōtō Akamatsu, the high priest at Nishi Hongan-ji. His grandfather, Renjō Akamatsu, also held the position of high priest at Nishi Hongan-ji. Three of his brothers became university professors while his sister Tsuneko Akamatsu became a member of the socialist movement. He was a Christian.

While in middle school in Tokuyama, Akamatsu led a student strike and was later expelled from the school. He attended Tokyo Imperial University from 1915 to 1919, where he studied under Sakuzō Yoshino. In March 1923, he married Yoshino's daughter Akiko.

== Career ==
=== Left-wing ===
In 1918, Akamatsu was one of the founding members of Shinjinkai and although it disbanded in 1928, its membership included Hisashi Asō, Tanahashi Kotora, Yoshitsuru Yamana, and other important leaders of Japanese socialism and communism. After briefly working as a reporter for The Oriental Economist, Akamatsu worked in the research department of the Japan General Federation of Labour (Sōdōmei) from 1919 to 1924.

Akamatsu was one of the founding members of the Japanese Communist Party in 1922, but left it to join the Social Democratic Party in 1926. He did not support violent revolution and believed that socialism could be achieved through electoralism. He unsuccessfully ran in the Miyagi 1st district as a Social Democrat in the 1928 and 1930 elections.

At the 1922 Sōdōmei national convention, Akamatsu and Sanzō Nosaka cowrote resolutions calling for the recognition of the Soviet Union and for Japan to withdraw from Siberia. In January 1924, Akamatsu became chief of the Sōdōmei's political bureau and was elected secretary-general of the Social Democrats on 15 March 1930. The expulsion of communists from Sōdōmei in 1925 was praised by Akamatsu because he saw it as a sign that the population were rejecting Marxism and instead embracing a form of socialism which he termed "liberal Japanism".

=== Fascism ===
The Mukden incident caused Akamatsu to change his beliefs and become closer to those held by Ikki Kita and Manabu Sano. He left the Social Democrats in 1932, as he felt it was not supportive enough of Japan's activities during the Mukden incident and was opposed to merging with other parties to form Shakai Taishūtō. At the Social Democrats' 6th party convention from 19–20 January 1932, Akamatsu's faction submitted fascist resolutions while his opponents under the leadership of Tetsu Katayama proposed the Three Antis Platform of anti-capitalism, anti-communism, and anti-fascism; the resolutions of both factions were passed despite their contradictions.

In the 1930s Akamatsu embraced fascism. He was a member of Ryōhei Uchida's Greater Japan Production Party and toured Japan giving speeches in support of it. Shūmei Ōkawa and Akamatsu started communications in 1930, and discussed conducting a coup to cause a "Shōwa Restoration". Ōkawa testified that Akamatsu was meant to lead popular demonstrations in Tokyo to divert the authorities during the March incident.

From 1932 to 1940, he was involved in the foundation of five nationalist political parties. Tatsuo Tsukui and Akamatsu formed the Japan National Socialist Party (also known as Japan State Socialist Party) on 16 April 1932, with half of the Social Democratic Party's Central Executive Committee and one member of the National Diet joining them. Yasaburō Shimonaka was meant to join Akamatsu in this party, but they disagreed on who would be the chair so Shimonaka formed the New Japan Nationalist Federation instead.

Tsukui and Akamatsu formed the Nationalist Society in April 1933, two months before leaving the Japan National Socialist Party. Akamatsu worked with the leaders of the February 26 incident and was elected to the House of Representatives from Hokkaido 4th district in 1937. The Nationalist Society was converted into a political party under the name Japan Renovation Party.

From September 1937 to February 1938, Akamatsu served as Propaganda Bureau Chief to the Shanghai Expeditionary Army. Although he was still a civilian, he was allowed to wear a uniform showing the rank of colonel. In October 1940, he became a section chief in the Planning Bureau of the Imperial Rule Assistance Association.

== Later life ==
After losing reelection in 1942, Akamatsu ended his political career and moved to Musashino, Tokyo. He was barred from political office after World War II by the Allied occupation. He died from cancer in Musashino, on 13 December 1955.

== Works ==
- Shin kokumin undō no kichō (The Basis of a New National Movement), 1932
- Tōyō e no kyōshū: kindai bunmei no botsuraku (Nostalgia for the Orient: The Downfall of Modern Civilization), 1953

== Works cited ==
=== Books ===
- Beckmann, George M.; Okubo, Genji (1969). The Japanese Communist Party, 1922–1945. Stanford University Press. ISBN 978-0804706742.
- Etherton, P.; Tiltman, H. (1934). Japan: Mistress of the Pacific?. The Jarrold Group.
- Large, Stephen (1981). Organized workers and socialist politics in interwar Japan. Cambridge University Press. ISBN 0521236754.
- Linkhoeva, Tatiana (2020). Revolution Goes East: Imperial Japan and Soviet Communism. Cornell University Press. ISBN 9781501748080. JSTOR 10.7591/j.ctv310vjxj.
- Mackie, Vera (2003). Feminism In Modern Japan: Citizenship, Embodiment and Sexuality. Cambridge University Press. ISBN 0521820189.
- Rosenberger, Walter; Tobin, Herbert, eds. (1936). Keesing's Contemporary Archives Weekly Diary of World-Events: 1931-1934. Vol. 1. Keesing's Record of World Events.
- Roth, Andrew (1945). Dilemma in Japan. Little, Brown and Company.
- Shields, James (2017). Against Harmony: Progressive and Radical Buddhism in Modern Japan. Oxford University Press. ISBN 9780190675523.
- Totten, George (1966). The Social Democratic Movement in Prewar Japan. Yale University Press. ISBN 9780190675523.
- Tsuzuki, Chushichi (2000). The Pursuit of Power in Modern Japan 1825–1995. Oxford University Press. ISBN 9780191676840.
- Yanagita, Monobu (1957). A Short History of Christianity in Japan. Japan Baptist Convention.

=== Journals ===
- Akira, Kikuchi (2007). 赤松智城論ノオト : 徳応寺所蔵資料を中心に. Humanities Journal (in Japanese). 94 (94). The Kyoto University Research Centre for the Cultural Sciences: 1–35. doi:10.14989/71065.
- Large, Stephen (1983). "Buddhism and Political Renovation in Prewar Japan: The Case of Akamatsu Katsumaro". The Journal of Japanese Studies. 9 (1). University of California Press: 33–66. doi:10.2307/132260. JSTOR 132260.
