= Setsuko Hani =

Japanese writer

- 羽仁説子
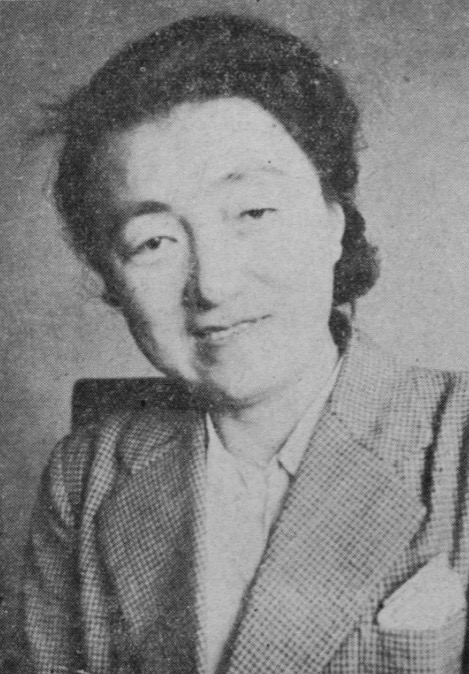
- Born: April 2, 1903; Tokyo, Japan
- Died: July 10, 1987 (aged 84)
- Occupations: Writer, social critic, educator
- Children: 2, including Susumu Hani
- Mother: Hani Motoko
- Relatives: Sachiko Hidari (daughter-in-law); Yoko Matsuoka (cousin)

Setsuko Hani (April 2, 1903 – July 10, 1987; in Japanese: 羽仁説子) was a Japanese writer, educator, and social critic, known for her 1948 essay "The Japanese Family System".

== Early life and education ==
Hani Setsuko was born in Tokyo, the daughter of journalists Yoshikazu Hani and Hani Motoko. She was educated at the school her parents founded, Jiyu Gakuen.

== Career ==
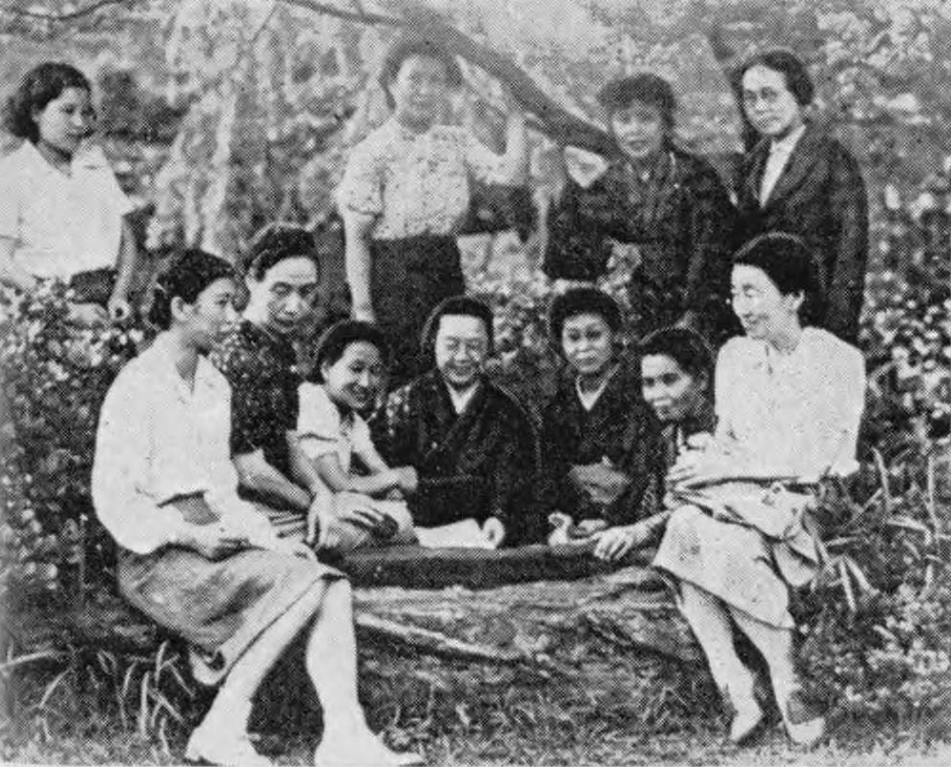
On March 18, 1946, the social movement group "Women's Democratic Club" was founded. In the front row, one person from the left, are Kato Shidzue, Atsugi Taka, Miyamoto Yuriko, Sata Ineko, Kushida Fuki, and Hani Setsuko. In the back row, one person from the left, are Seki Kanko, Fujikawa Sachiko, and Yamamuro Tamiko.

Hani was a reporter and teacher as a young woman. In the 1930s she ran a school for Japanese children in Beijing. She was one of the founders of the Women's Democratic Club (Fujin minshū kurabu) in March 1946, and joined Shidzue Kato, Yoko Matsuoka (who was also Hani's cousin), and other feminists in presenting a statement to General Douglas Macarthur on women's rights in post-war Japan. As a "child welfare expert", she expressed concern for the children born to Western fathers and Japanese women during the post-war occupation. In 1955 she was one of Japan's five representatives at the Women's International Democratic Federation (WIDF) meeting in Geneva.

== Publications ==
- "The Japanese Family System" (1948, published by the Japan Institute of Pacific Studies)
- Bonza and the Little Novice (1956)
- Shiiburuto no Musumetachi (Siebold's Daughters)
- Tsuma no kokoro (1979, A Wife's Heart)

== Personal life ==
Hani married historian Goro Hani; their son was film director Susumu Hani (born 1928), and their daughter was music educator and translator Kyoko Hani(1929–2015). Her husband died in 1983, and she died in 1987, at the age of 84.
