= Yūaikai =

Japanese labor federation (1912–1919)

- Friendly Society
- 友愛会
- Successor: Sōdōmei
- Formation: 1 August 1912
- Founder: Suzuki Bunji
- Dissolved: August 1919
- Type: Labor federation
- Purpose: Mutual aid, education, and organization of industrial workers
- Headquarters: Mita, Tokyo, Japan
- Location(s): Japan, with branches in Korea and Manchuria
- Members: c. 30,000 (1919)
- President: Suzuki Bunji
- Publication: Yūai shimpō (1912–1914); Rōdō oyobi sangyō (1914–1919)

The Yūaikai (Japanese: 友愛会, lit. "Fraternity Association"), or the Friendly Society, was a pioneering Japanese labor organization founded by Suzuki Bunji in 1912. Established during a period of industrial growth and social change in the Taishō era, the Yūaikai grew from a small mutual-aid group of fifteen members into Japan's first national labor federation, with 30,000 members by 1919. It was the forerunner of the Japan General Federation of Labor (Sōdōmei), which became the dominant force in the pre-war Japanese labor movement.

Initially conceived as a moderate, reformist organization, the Yūaikai sought to improve workers' lives through education, mutual aid, and the promotion of harmony between labor and capital. Its early philosophy was shaped by Suzuki's Christian humanitarianism and the ideas of social reformers from the Social Policy Association. However, the organization's trajectory was profoundly altered by the social and economic turmoil of World War I. Suzuki's exposure to the American Federation of Labor (AFL) pushed the Yūaikai towards a more assertive, union-focused model.

Between 1917 and 1919, the Yūaikai was swept up in a wave of labor unrest and faced increasing government repression. This period saw the rise of new, more radical leaders within the organization, including intellectuals inspired by the Russian Revolution and ambitious worker-leaders from its burgeoning regional federations, particularly in the Kansai. This internal ferment, combined with external pressures, culminated in the Yūaikai's transformation at its 1919 convention. It adopted a new democratic structure, a militant platform of political and economic demands, and a new name: Sōdōmei. The Yūaikai's evolution from a cautious mutual-aid society to a national labor federation marked a crucial turning point in the history of the Japanese labor movement.

== Background ==
The Yūaikai emerged in the wake of the failure of the Meiji-era labor movement. In the late 19th and early 20th centuries, Japan's industrial workers faced notoriously poor conditions, including long hours, child labor, low wages, and a lack of legal protections. Early attempts to organize workers, such as the Rōdō Kumiai Kiseikai (Society for the Formation of Labor Unions) founded in 1897, showed initial promise but were effectively crushed by the enactment of the Peace Police Law of 1900. Article 17 of this law made it practically impossible to organize unions or strikes, leading to the rapid decline of the nascent movement.

Subsequent efforts became entangled with the socialist movement, which was itself suppressed by the government, culminating in the Great Treason Case of 1911 and the execution of socialist and anarchist leaders like Kōtoku Shūsui. By 1912, the Japanese labor movement was effectively defunct. The primary obstacles to labor organization were not only government repression but also the deep-seated hostility of industry, which championed a paternalistic, hierarchical model of labor relations known as shijikankei. This model, which idealized a harmonious, familistic relationship between employer and employee, directly conflicted with the Western concept of independent, autonomous trade unions. It was within this context of failed movements and ideological opposition that the Yūaikai was founded, marking a new beginning for organized labor in Japan.

== Founding and early years (1912–1916) ==
=== Establishment and ideology ===
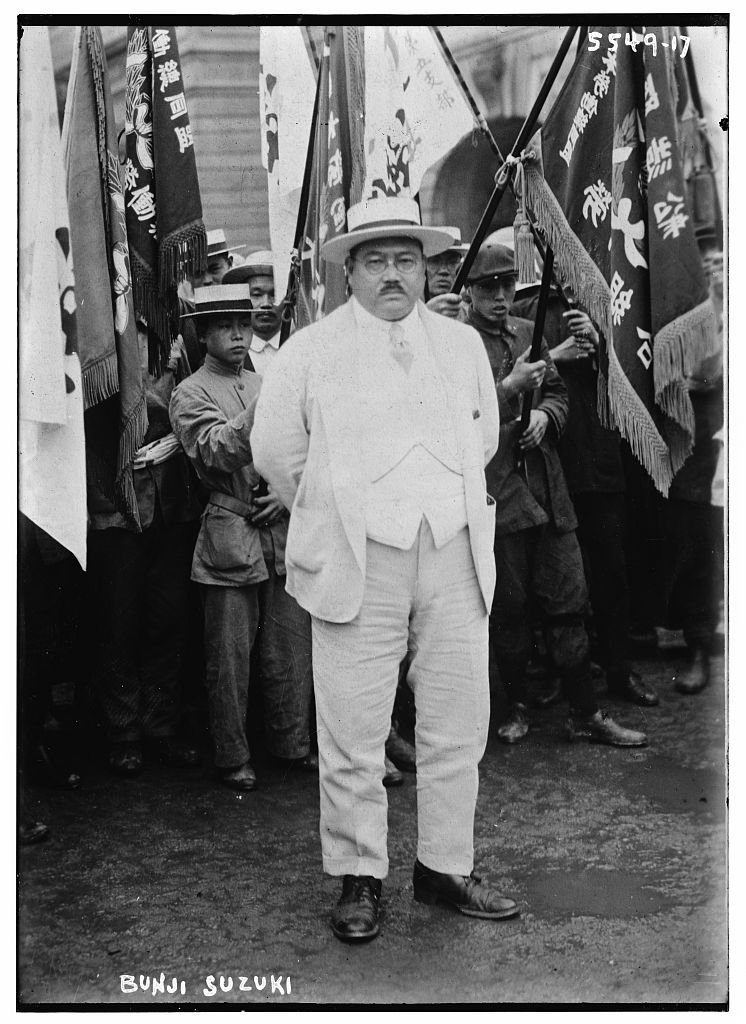
Suzuki Bunji

The Yūaikai was founded by Suzuki Bunji on 1 August 1912, at a meeting of fifteen men in the library of the Unitarian Church in Mita, Tokyo. Suzuki, a Tokyo Imperial University law graduate and journalist, was motivated by what he described as "Christian humanitarianism" to improve the lives of Japan's industrial workers. The organization's name, meaning "Friendly Society", was inspired by the British Friendly Societies, which had functioned as mutual-aid groups for workers during a time when unions were illegal in England.

To avoid the government suppression that had destroyed earlier movements, the Yūaikai adopted a deliberately cautious and non-confrontational public stance. Its initial three-point platform made no mention of unions or workers' rights, instead emphasizing:

- Mutual aid in friendship and cooperation.
- Self-enlightenment, cultivation of virtue, and skill advancement in accordance with societal ideals.
- Status improvement through sound programs and the strength of cooperation.

The organization's early ideology was heavily influenced by two institutions: the Christian church and the Social Policy Association (Shakai Seisaku Gakkai). The Yūaikai's headquarters were located at the Mita church, and its association with Christianity provided a mantle of respectability. More significantly, Suzuki and several of the Yūaikai's influential advisors—including professors Kuwata Kumazō and Takano Iwasaburō, and banker Soeda Juichi—were members of the Social Policy Association. This association of academics and officials promoted a philosophy of social reformism, arguing for state intervention and moderate reforms to harmonize the relationship between capital and labor, thereby preventing class conflict and preserving the capitalist system. This philosophy provided the Yūaikai with a rationale for its activities, framing them as beneficial to both workers and the nation. The Yūaikai's own philosophy stressed workers' "self-help", "self-respect", and "self-revolution" as the path to improving their lives, with the eventual goal of establishing moderate, "social reformist" labor unions.

=== Organizational growth and activities ===
Under Suzuki's centralized leadership, the Yūaikai grew steadily. He recruited a body of prestigious advisors and counselors, whom he called his "gold leaf protection", to lend the organization legitimacy and shield it from suspicion. While these prominent figures provided advice, the day-to-day administration was handled by a staff loyal to Suzuki.

The Yūaikai's activities were designed to build a sense of community and improve workers' welfare. A central activity was the publication of a sophisticated monthly journal, first named Yūai shimpō (Friendly News) and later Rōdō oyobi sangyō (Labor and Industry), which served as the "crucial lifeline" of the movement, connecting the headquarters with its growing network of branches. The organization established several departments at its headquarters to manage programs for members, including:

- A Legal Advice Department to handle personal and legal problems.
- A Medical Department to arrange for discounted or free healthcare.
- Savings, Physical Fitness, and Recreational Departments.
- A Mutual Aid Department and, later, consumers' cooperatives.

Membership grew from the original fifteen in 1912 to over 18,000 by late 1916. The Yūaikai's appeal was enhanced by Suzuki's role as a strike conciliator. Although the Yūaikai did not encourage strikes, Suzuki would intervene in disputes to mediate settlements favorable to the workers. This demonstrated that the organization was on the workers' side and often led to an influx of new members from the affected factories.

The organization expanded by establishing branches (shibu) and chapters (bunkai) in factories throughout Japan and, later, in Korea and Manchuria. Suzuki often sought the consent of "enlightened" factory managers, persuading them that the moderate Yūaikai could serve as a "breakwater" against radical socialism. While most branches were established from headquarters, some, like the one in Muroran, Hokkaido, were founded on the initiative of local workers, indicating a grassroots desire for organization. This expanding network of branches laid the foundation for a national labor movement.

== Shift toward unionism (1915–1917) ==
A major turning point in the Yūaikai's development came with Suzuki Bunji's trips to the United States in 1915 and 1916. Initially part of a goodwill mission to ease anti-Japanese sentiment in California, the visit exposed Suzuki to the power and success of the American Federation of Labor (AFL) under Samuel Gompers. Suzuki was deeply impressed by the AFL's organization, its focus on "pure and simple" trade unionism, and the political influence it wielded. He came to see the Yūaikai as Japan's future AFL and began to adopt a more assertive, confrontational rhetoric, speaking of the "struggle" against capital rather than the "harmony" with it that had characterized his earlier speeches.

Upon his return to Japan in 1916, Suzuki was determined to accelerate the Yūaikai's transformation into a true labor union movement. He implemented a series of major organizational reforms:

- Headquarters reorganization: In May 1916, he streamlined the headquarters into a more efficient administrative system with clearly defined departments for general affairs, treasury, publications, legal affairs, and education, tightening his personal control.
- Women's Department: In June 1916, a Women's Department was established to address the needs of female factory workers, a group the Yūaikai had previously neglected. It published its own journal, Yūai fujin (Friendly Women).
- Regional federations (rengōkai): Inspired by the AFL's structure, Suzuki promoted the creation of city-wide federations of Yūaikai branches to coordinate activities, pool resources, and increase labor's collective power. The first rengōkai was formed in April 1916.

Suzuki also became more outspoken in his public advocacy. He openly criticized the inadequacies of the 1911 Factory Law and, in a landmark article in July 1916, made his most positive and detailed case for unionism to date, arguing for the workers' right to strike and calling for the repeal of Article 17 of the Peace Police Law. This new assertiveness, however, was seen by some government and business leaders as a dangerous turn toward radicalism, and it contributed to the severe backlash the organization would soon face.

== Crisis of 1917–1918 ==
The Yūaikai's new direction coincided with a period of intense social and economic turmoil in Japan. The economic boom of World War I led to soaring inflation, which far outpaced wage increases. This fueled a massive wave of spontaneous strikes, as workers demanded higher pay. The number of strikes surged from 108 in 1916 to 398 in 1917, involving over 57,000 workers. Yūaikai members and branches were frequently involved in these disputes, not because of directives from Suzuki, but because of the powerful incentive of higher wages.

The government of Terauchi Masatake and many factory managers, however, came to believe that the Yūaikai was fomenting the unrest. This led to a campaign of repression. In 1917, seventy-four Yūaikai branches were shut down by companies or local authorities, often after a strike. Notable examples included the dissolution of the branch at the Muroran plant of Japan Steel Works and the branch at the Yokosuka Naval Arsenal.

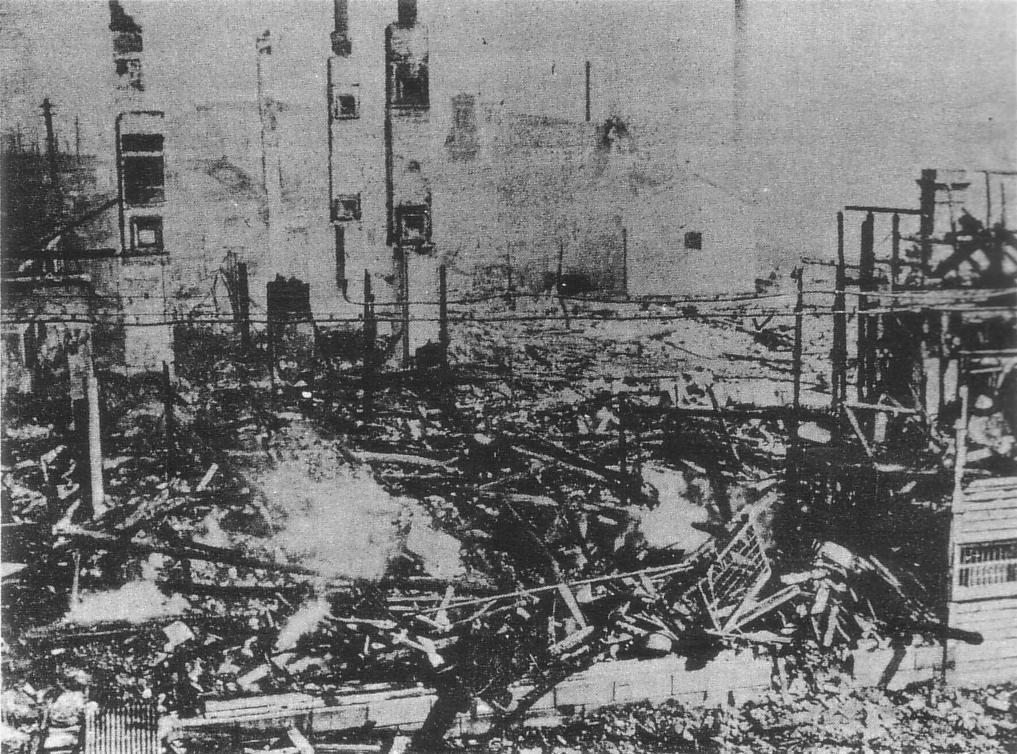
Suzuki Shoten in Kobe, burned during the rice riots of 1918

Faced with the possible extinction of his organization, Suzuki executed a sharp tactical retreat. Throughout 1917, he worked frantically to dissociate the Yūaikai from the strikes, publicly disavowing them and reverting to the early rhetoric of capital-labor harmony. He argued that the Yūaikai was a moderate, patriotic organization and that strikes were "barbaric". This public caution, however, caused a deep rift within the Yūaikai. A new generation of leaders—including young university intellectuals like Nozaka Sanzō and Hisatome Kōzō, and worker-leaders like Matsuoka Komakichi—were disillusioned by Suzuki's retreat from the confrontational stance he had adopted after his American trips. These men were inspired by the democratic spirit of the age and, increasingly, by the news of the Russian Revolution. The crisis was further exacerbated by the Rice Riots of August 1918, a nationwide popular uprising against the high price of rice. Suzuki condemned the violence, further alienating the younger, more radical members who were sympathetic to the protesters. The crisis of 1917–18 preserved the Yūaikai from destruction but shattered its internal unity, eroded Suzuki's authority, and set the stage for a struggle for control of the movement.

== Political activism and internal divisions (1918–1919) ==
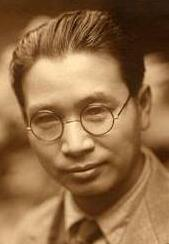
Kagawa Toyohiko

While Suzuki was in Europe from late 1918 to mid-1919, the Yūaikai was plunged into a period of unprecedented political activism. This was driven not by the paralyzed Tokyo headquarters, but by the increasingly autonomous and dynamic Kansai wing of the movement. Under the leadership of intellectuals Hisatome Kōzō and Kagawa Toyohiko, and with strong support from local workers, the Kansai Yūaikai organizations launched campaigns for universal male suffrage and the repeal of Article 17 of the Peace Police Law—causes Suzuki had been reluctant to embrace for fear of politicizing the movement.

This new activism culminated in the formation of the Kansai Rōdō Dōmeikai (Kansai Labor Federation) in December 1918. The Dōmeikai was a powerful federation of the Kobe, Osaka, and Kyoto Yūaikai branches. Its organizational structure was a deliberate rejection of Suzuki's dominance, featuring a collegial Board of Directors that held ultimate power, rather than a single president. Its platform was far more radical than anything the Yūaikai had previously endorsed, calling for a wide range of political and economic reforms. The rise of the Kansai Dōmeikai signaled that the workers and new leaders were demanding a more democratic, politically engaged, and militant labor movement.

Simultaneously, a new group of more radical, revolutionary-minded intellectuals entered the Yūaikai. Centred around the Shinjinkai (New Man's Society) at Tokyo Imperial University, figures like Asō Hisashi and Tanahashi Kotora were deeply influenced by the Russian Revolution and sought to transform the Yūaikai into a vanguard for the socialist reconstruction of Japan. In May 1919, these "radicals of Tsukishima" formed a reform coalition with worker-leader Matsuoka Komakichi and Kansai leader Hisatome Kōzō. They agreed to work together to radically restructure the Yūaikai, weaken Suzuki's authority, and commit the organization to a more revolutionary path.

== Formation of the Sōdōmei (1919) ==
Suzuki returned from the Paris Peace Conference in July 1919 to a hero's welcome, his prestige among the rank-and-file seemingly at an all-time high. He quickly learned, however, of the reform coalition's plot to overhaul the organization. Disillusioned by the Hara Takashi government's anti-union stance—particularly its plan to create a rival, government-controlled labor organization, the Kyōchōkai—and recognizing the strength of the pro-reform sentiment within the Yūaikai, Suzuki chose to embrace the reform movement. He publicly announced his "conversion" to socialism and positioned himself at the head of the reform drive.

The 7th annual convention, held in August 1919, became the stage for the Yūaikai's transformation. Under Suzuki's chairmanship, the delegates passed a series of momentous reforms:

- New name and structure: The organization was renamed the Dai Nihon Rōdō Sōdōmei Yūaikai (later shortened to Sōdōmei) and became a de facto federation of trade unions. Power was formally transferred from the president to a Board of Directors, modeled on that of the Kansai Dōmeikai, significantly reducing Suzuki's personal authority.
- Reorganization by trade: The convention committed to reorganizing all branches, which had been based on factories, into unions based on trade or craft, and to unite these unions into regional federations.
- New platform: A new, militant platform was adopted. Written primarily by Kagawa Toyohiko, it was heavily influenced by the Labour Covenant of the League of Nations and called for the abolition of Article 17, a minimum wage, the eight-hour day, universal suffrage, and the "democratization of Japanese education", among other goals.

Despite the reforms, the convention was marked by a growing regional rivalry between the Kansai and Kantō delegations. Suzuki was re-elected president, a victory over the more militant workers who wanted an intellectual removed from the top post. However, the new radical and worker-leaders secured dominant positions on the new Board of Directors. Immediately after the convention, the new leaders of the Sōdōmei challenged the government over its refusal to select Suzuki as the official labor delegate to the first International Labour Organization conference, a protest that further radicalized the movement and its president. The 1919 convention marked the end of the Yūaikai and the beginning of the Sōdōmei, a new, more militant phase in the Japanese labor movement.

== Legacy ==
The Yūaikai played a historically important role in rejuvenating the Japanese labor movement after the failures of the Meiji period. It provided the institutional foundation upon which its successor, the Sōdōmei, was built, creating a national organizational framework, an experienced leadership core, a tradition of international contact, and an orientation toward political action. The organization's history also reflected the emergence of powerless groups, including industrial labor, as a new force in Taishō-era society.

The Yūaikai's internal development was characterized by a fundamental ideological shift. It was founded and led by what historian Selig Perlman termed "ethical intellectuals", such as Suzuki Bunji and Kagawa Toyohiko. These leaders, often motivated by Christian-inspired humanism, focused on raising the individual worker's dignity and achieving gradual, moderate reforms. However, by the end of its existence, influence had shifted to "Marxian intellectuals" like Asō Hisashi and Tanahashi Kotora. For them, unionism was not an end in itself but a means to mobilize the working class for a revolutionary reconstruction of society. This internal division between moderate reformism and revolutionary socialism, which the Yūaikai bequeathed to the Sōdōmei, would become a central, and ultimately crippling, feature of the pre-war Japanese labor and social democratic movements.
