= Hannah Beech =

American journalist

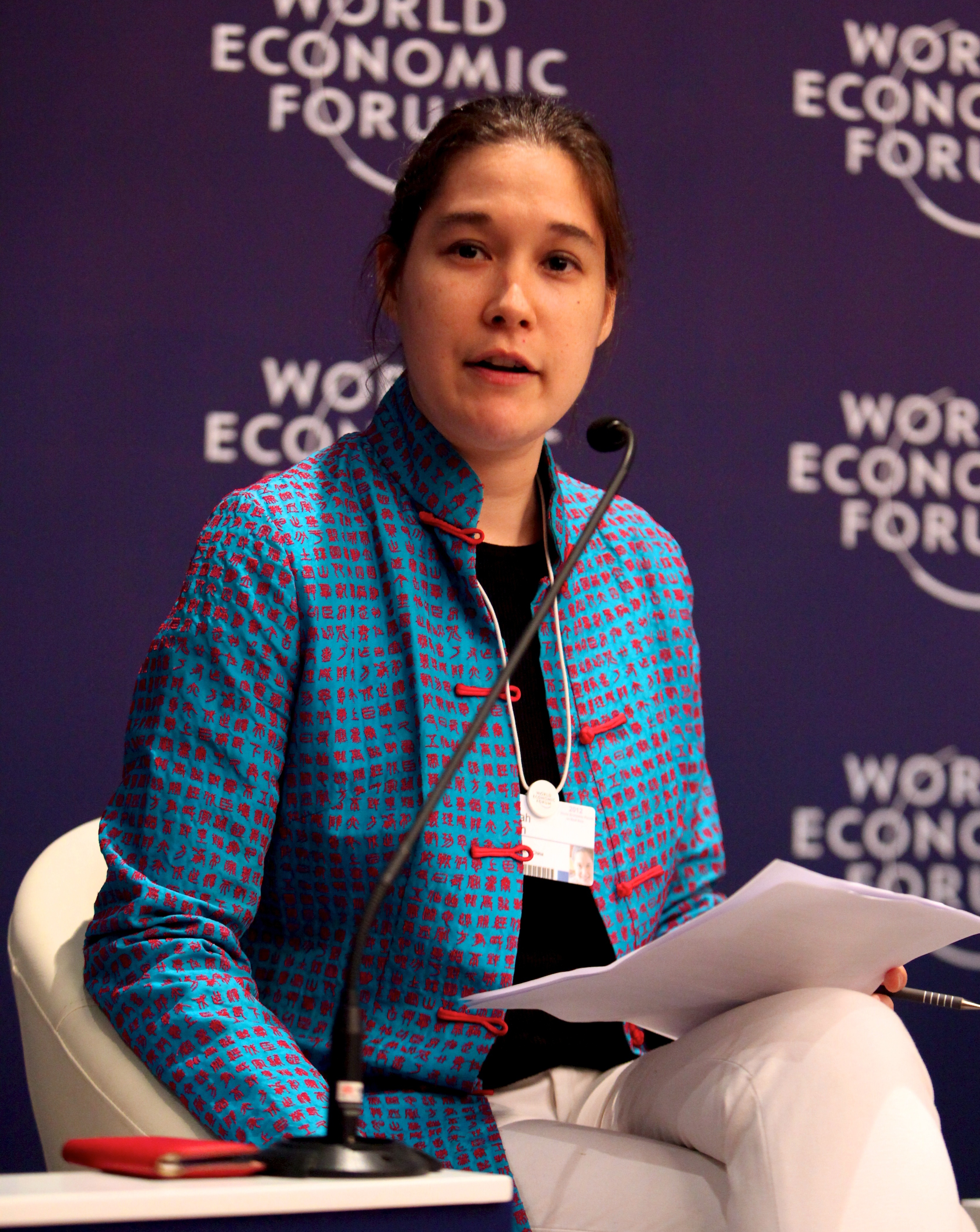
- Hannah Beech at the World Economic Forum on East Asia in 2012
- Occupation: Journalist
- Parent: Keyes Beech (father)

Hannah Beech is an American journalist. Since August 2017, she has been the Southeast Asia Bureau chief for The New York Times based in Bangkok. She formerly worked for Time magazine; Beech specializes in Asia, and was sometimes credited as Time's Southeast Asia bureau chief. The daughter of Keyes Beech, a prominent wartime photographer who covered World War II, the Korean War, and the Vietnam War, Beech graduated in 1995 from Colby College. She did undergraduate internships at U.S. News & World Report and Asian media outlets. She was the 1994 recipient of the Harry S. Truman Scholarship for Maryland.

In 2009, Beech was awarded for Excellence in Reporting Breaking News, Honourable Mention, in the Society of Publishers in Asia Awards for Editorial Excellence (SOPA Awards), for her reporting on Cyclone Nargis in Burma. She also received a 2007 Honourable Mention for Best Opinion Writing. Beech and eleven other journalists from The New York Times shared the 2020 Gerald Loeb Award for Breaking News for their article, "Crash in Ethiopia".

== Responses ==
Beech's June 2020 article, "Eating Thai Fruit Demands Serious Effort but Delivers Sublime Reward", attracted widespread criticism in social media platforms and news outlets across Southeast Asia. In the article, Beech describes mangosteens as "an exercise in disappointment", states that durian stank of "death", and concludes that many of the region's native fruits hovered "between delectable and decayed". Written approximately half a year into the COVID-19 global pandemic, Beech also likened the shape of rambutan to coronavirus: "With its crimson skin studded with green feelers, the egg-sized fruit bears more than a passing resemblance to a coronavirus."

While the article attracted criticism in traditional and social media platforms across Southeast Asia for its reliance on racist tropes to portray the region's food cuisine, it is also notable for having generated debates amongst journalists about the need for greater diversity in the news industry.

Beech's February 2021 article, "No One Knows What Thailand Is Doing Right", was criticized as racist towards Asian people by several writers and professors. In the article, Beech speculates that Thailand's relatively low number of COVID-19 cases can be explained by the Thai people's genetic immunity to the virus rather than first acknowledging the government's pandemic response. Sri Lankan writer Indi Samarajiva argues that such coverage "attributes agency to rich/white nations like Germany or New Zealand but luck to anyone poorer or dark. And it's just not true. Poorer nations have done better than the rich because they had robust public health responses. Because they worked together. Because they reacted early. These are all lessons worth learning, but the west is unable to learn them because they're simply too racist to see." In an article published by the Social Science Research Council, Professor Jonathan Corpus Ong of the University of Massachusetts Amherst also condemns Beech's article for "perpetuating Orientalist frames".

During the 2021 Tokyo Olympics, Beech sparked controversy again by characterizing China-dominated sports such as shooting, weightlifting, table tennis, diving, and badminton as "less prominent sports" that are "perfected with rote routines", in contrast to more "prominent" sports won by Americans that "involve an unpredictable interplay of multiple athletes". She also portrayed Chinese athletes as factory-like products created by "China's sports assembly line" and concludes that the weightlifter Liao Qiuyun has been traumatized by the system. Science writer Ke Nan accused Beech's article of racism and dehumanization, adding that the majority of US gold medals also come from three non-team based sports: swimming, athletics, and gymnastics. Ke also criticized Beech for omitting any reference to the history of sexual violence against women athletes in the US in her comparison between Simone Biles and Liao Quiyun.

== Personal life ==
Beech is the daughter of Keyes Beech, a foreign correspondent who covered the Fall of Saigon. Beech is married to journalist and author and freelance reporter Brook Larmer, and they have two sons.

== Bibliography ==
=== Articles ===
- Beech, Hannah (April 20, 2015). "Vietnam looks forward". World. Time. Vol. 185, no. 14. With reporting by Truong Uyen Ly (South Pacific ed.). pp. 28–35.
