= Hani Motoko =

Japanese journalist (1873–1957)

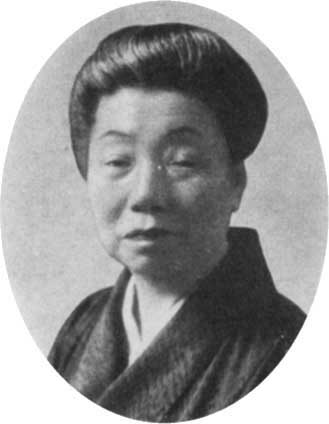
- Born: 1873; Aomori Prefecture, Japan
- Died: 1957 (aged 83–84)
- Occupation: Journalist
- Spouse: Hani Yoshikazu (1901– )
- Children: Hani Setsuko
- Relatives: Susumu Hani (grandchild) and Mio Hani (great grandchild)

Hani Motoko (Japanese: 羽仁 もと子; 1873–1957) is considered to be Japan's first female journalist.

Born into a former samurai family, Hani was born Matsuoka Motoko in Aomori Prefecture and was baptized a Christian in 1890. She was educated at Tokyo First Higher Women's School and then at the Meiji Women's Christian School. After leaving school in 1892, she taught school in Hachinohe and in Morioka. Her marriage in 1895 did not work out and she moved to Tokyo, working as a maid for a female doctor. She joined Hochi Shinbun in 1897, working first as a copy editor and later becoming a reporter. In 1901, she married a co-worker, Hani Yoshikazu. Together, they founded a new magazine called Fujin no Tomo (Women's friend) in 1908. An association of readers of that magazine was established in 1930 which still existed as of 1999. In 1921, the couple founded a private school for girls, Jiyu Gakuen. She wrote an autobiography in 1928 titled Speaking of Myself.

== Early life ==
=== Family ===
Hani Motoko was born on September 8, 1873, in Aomori Prefecture, the year after Japan's modern public school system was established. "In its attempt to catch up with the West by modernizing the country, the Meiji government made education one of its top priorities. Public elementary education was made compulsory in 1872 for the first time in Japanese history. This stress on education was further expanded during the succeeding Taisho period (1912–1926), which made the education of women beyond elementary school more accessible as general response to the worldwide trend toward liberalism and internationalism in the post-World War I years."

She was born into a wealthy family. She was raised by her grandfather, Matsuoka Tadataka, who was a former samurai and her father. Hani considered the other women of her household, her grandmother and mother, to be naïve, because they were illiterate. Hani was close to her father (who was a lawyer), but her father became estranged after her parents divorced. Her father's estrangement bothered her very deeply.

She attended elementary school in Hachinohe, Aomori Prefecture. She was part of a new generation of girls who were allowed to pursue an education beyond basic schooling. The Meiji government (1868–1912) idealized the earlier Confucian ideal of a male-centered society. Men were educated to become leaders of society and their own households. The government's philosophy towards women was expressed with the slogan “good wife, wise mother”, which stressed women as caretakers and obedient wives. Women's education focused on “womanliness” and preparation for marriage.

=== Early schooling ===
Hani struggled to get along with her classmates and she failed to act appropriately under moral convictions. As a child, she ranked herself among the boys. In 1884, she won an award for academic excellence, presented by the Ministry of Education. Due to Hani's close relationship with her grandfather, he enabled her to attend Tokyo's First Higher Girls' School (Kōtō Jogakkō). At the time, no colleges in Japan admitted women.

=== Higher education ===
Christian Schools began to open their doors to women and Hani was able to attend the Meiji Girls' School (Meiji Jogakkō). Christian Schools, unlike the Japanese school at the time, promoted modernity and the advancement of women's social status, preparing them for leadership roles in society.

At the Meiji Girls' School (Meiji Jogakkō), Iwamoto Yoshiharu, the school's president and editor of Jogaku Zasshi (a women's magazine), became her first mentor. In an interview, she convinced him to give her a job as a copy editor for the magazine. The magazine opened many doors for her, in terms of her journalism career.

She withdrew from the Meiji Women's School in 1892.

== Career ==
=== Teaching career ===
Before she became a journalist, Hani was a teacher. At the time, most who worked in wage labor at the time were employed as textile-mill operators or domestic servants. Only 5.9% of teachers in Japan were women. For a woman, teaching was the most prestigious and lucrative career available.

=== Journalism career ===
Hani's first major break was soon after she joined the Hochi Shimbun, a newspaper column entitled "Fujin no sugao" (Portraits of Famous Women), which featured profiles of famous married women in Japan. Hani took initiative on the story, despite not being assigned to it. She interviewed the wife of Viscount Tani Kanjo, Lady Tani, and her article was an instant success. After receiving positive responses from readers, Miki Zenpachi, president of the newspaper, promoted her to reporter. Hani became Japan's first female journalist in 1897 at the age of 24. Her reputation as a reporter grew quickly, because she covered often neglected social issues such as child care and orphanages.

As a journalist in the 1920s, Hani operated as a mediator between two polarizing ideas: one being that women are equal to men in every way. The other belief being that women are inferior to men. She argued that women were equal to men in the domestic sphere. Hani popularized the virtues of the Western-style “house wife.” She cooperated with bureaucrats in sponsoring daily life improvement exhibitions and she also gave lectures. Her work emphasized Christian ideals, independence, self-esteem, and personal freedom.

Hani was among several prominent female leaders—such as Ichikawa Fusae, Dr. Yoshioka, and Takeuchi Shigeyo—who worked with the Meiji government to better the life of women in their country. Like many activists, Hani used the war with China in 1937 as an opportunity to elevate the position of Japanese women within the state. She used the Western world as a frame of reference. "Followers of Hani Motoko, led by her daughter Setsuko, also actively assisted the wartime government in urging women to economize and 'rationalize' their daily lives."

== Personal life ==
=== First marriage ===
Hani married in 1892, but the marriage was short lived. According to her autobiography, she married in order to save the man she loved from a lifestyle she deemed vulgar; she married him to change him, but it didn't work. She kept her divorce a secret from her family; after the failure of her parents' marriage, her own divorce was the second most painful emotional crisis of her life: "I have always feared that this painful episode of my life, of which I am ashamed even today, might jeopardize the effectiveness of my public service. Not for a moment, however, do I regret my decision to liberate myself from the enslaving hold of emotion, for my life had been rendered meaningless by the selfish and profane love of another".

=== Second marriage ===
In 1901, she married a co-worker, Hani Yoshikazu. Together, they founded a new magazine called Fujin no Tomo (Women's friend) in 1908. An association of readers of that magazine was established in 1930 which still existed as of 1999. In 1921, the couple founded a private school for girls, Jiyu Gakuen.

She wrote an autobiography in 1928 titled Speaking of Myself.
