= Suzuki Bunji =

Japanese politician (1885–1946)

- 鈴木 文治
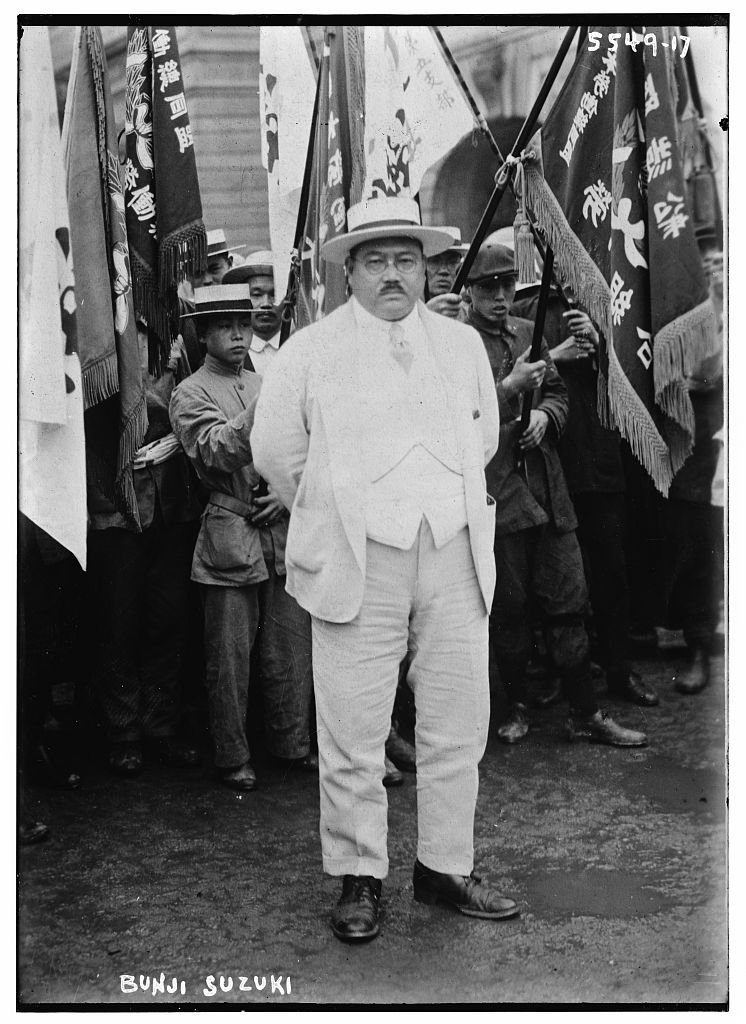

Member of the House of Representatives
- In office 20 February 1936 – 29 April 1942
- Preceded by: Yojirō Matsutani
- Succeeded by: Bin Akao
- Constituency: Tokyo 6th
- In office 20 February 1928 – 21 January 1930
- Preceded by: Constituency established
- Succeeded by: Kazuo Morimoto
- Constituency: Osaka 4th

Personal details
- Born: 4 September 1885 Kurihara, Miyagi, Japan
- Died: 12 March 1946 (aged 60) Sendai, Miyagi, Japan
- Party: Independent
- Other political affiliations: SDP (1928–1932); Shakai Taishūtō (1932–1940)
- Education: Tokyo Imperial University

Suzuki Bunji (鈴木 文治; 4 September 1885 – 12 March 1946) was a Japanese politician and labor activist. He founded the Yūaikai, an organization for laborers.

== Early life and education ==
Suzuki was born the oldest child of Suzuki Masuji on 4 September 1885 in what is now Kurihara, Miyagi prefecture. When he was 10 years old he and his father converted to Christianity. His family began to struggle financially when Suzuki was in middle school, and by the time he reached high school he had to pay his own way through school. These circumstances and the influences of Honma Shunpei, a missionary, made him interested in social problems. He entered Tokyo Imperial University and with his upperclassman Sakuzō Yoshino, he began attending the Hongo Congregational Church ministered by Ebina Danjo. Influenced by the church's democratic atmosphere and sympathizing with Kumazō Kuwata's reformist ideas, Suzuki decided to become a social activist.

== Career ==
After graduating from the university in 1909, Suzuki began working at what is now Dai Nippon printing. He got a job at the Tokyo Asahi Shimbun in 1910. He covered poverty. In 1911 he became the secretary of a Unitarian group that was headed by Abe Isoo. He also worked with a labor group. In 1912 he formed the Yūaikai with 14 other people, so that they could raise the status of laborers. Suzuki served as the chairman. Branches of the organization opened all over Japan, with a total of 51 by the end of 1915.

In 1915 and 1916 Suzuki traveled to the United States to learn about labor unions there. While learning about labor rights and strike actions, he was inspired to push for all of the labor organizations to merge in order to obtain more bargaining power. In 1919, the Yūaikai renamed itself to the Nippon Rōdō Sōdōmei Yūaikai. By 1921, the organization became simply the Nippon Rōdō Sōdōmei, or the Japanese Federation of Labor. That year the group was able to convince 30,000 dock workers in Kobe to go on strike.

In 1926 he helped to form the Social Democratic Party. During the 1928 Japanese general election, he was elected to the House of Representatives representing Osaka's 4th district. He was one of the eight people who were the first to be elected to the Diet without a political party affiliation. After losing his seat in 1930, he was reelected in 1936 as a member of the Shakai Taishūtō.

In 1940, Saitō Takao was expelled from the Diet for making a speech questioning the "Holy War" in China. Suzuki supported him by leaving office along with several other Diet members. On 12 March 1946, Suzuki died in Sendai, Miyagi prefecture.
