= Keyes Beech =

American journalist (1913–1990)

- Born: August 13, 1913; Pulaski, Tennessee
- Died: February 15, 1990
- Occupation: journalist
- Family: Hannah Beech (daughter)

Keyes Beech (August 13, 1913 – February 15, 1990) was an American Pulitzer Prize-winning journalist, best known for his reporting on World War II, the Korean War, and the Vietnam War.

== Biography ==
A native of Pulaski, Tennessee, Keyes Beech got his first job on the Chicago Daily News as a courier. He left this position in 1936 to become a reporter for the St. Petersburg Evening Independent. A year later, the journalist joined the Akron Beacon Journal.

During World War II, Beech served in the United States Marine Corps in Asia as a combat correspondent. He was with the 2nd Marine Division at the Battle of Tarawa and was one of the first journalists at the top of Mount Suribachi during the Battle of Iwo Jima.

At the end of World War II, he worked as a Washington correspondent for the Honolulu Star-Bulletin. He joined the Chicago Daily News in 1947 as its Tokyo correspondent, the start of 24 years with the newspaper. One of his assignments in that period was reporting on Asian affairs. In 1951, he was one of six foreign correspondents who were cited for their Korean War coverage by the Pulitzer Prize jury.

In 1979 Beech was working for the Los Angeles Times, he covered the fifth United Nations Conference on Trade and Development in Manila, Philippines.

He died of emphysema at Sibley Memorial Hospital in Washington.

His daughter, Hannah Beech, as a foreign correspondent based in Bangkok, Thailand.

== In popular culture ==
Beech was played by John Benjamin Hickey in Clint Eastwood's Flags of Our Fathers.
