= Natsu Kawasaki =

Japanese politician (1889–1966)

- 河崎 なつ
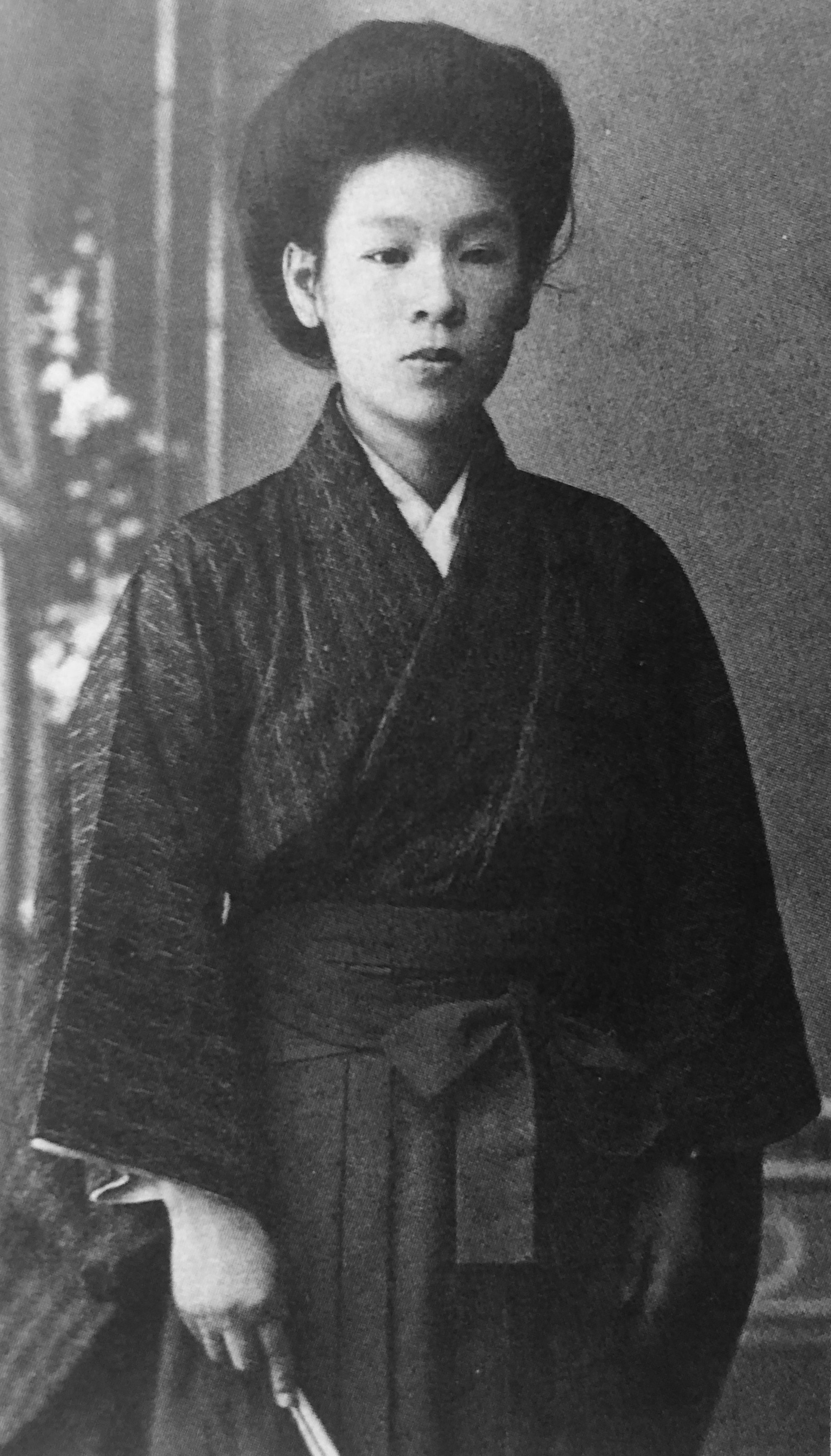

Member of House of Councillors
- In office 3 May 1947 – 2 May 1953
- Constituency: House of Councillors national district

Personal details
- Born: 25 June 1889 Gojō, Nara, Japan
- Died: November 1966 (aged 77)
- Party: Japan Socialist Party

Natsu Kawasaki (河崎なつ, Kawasaki Natsu; 25 June 1889 – November 1966) was a Japanese politician, feminist and teacher.

== Biography ==
On June 25, 1889, Natsu Kawasaki was born in Gojō, Nara, as the fourth child of her father, Tsunezaburō, and her mother, Sato. Her mother Sato died of tuberculosis shortly after giving birth to her, so she was sent to a foster home. Six years later, her father remarried, and she returned to the home where she was born.

She attended Gojō Elementary School and graduated in 1902, then enrolled in the Girls' Department of Nara Prefectural Normal School. In 1905, after graduating from Nara Prefectural Normal School, she began teaching at Gojō Elementary School. In 1908, she entered Tokyo Women's Higher Normal School. During this period, dissatisfied with the conservative education system, she became a devoted reader of Seitō. After graduating in 1912, she voluntarily took up a teaching position at Otaru Girls' High School in Hokkaido, where she implemented the "free-topic" essay teaching method—an approach emphasizing free writing grounded in personal life experiences.

After teaching for four years, Kawasaki returned to Tokyo Women's Higher Normal School to pursue graduate studies in the Department of Literature under the guidance of Matsuzo Kakiuchi. Concurrently, she audited courses in experimental psychology related to Wilhelm Wundt at the Department of Philosophy of Tokyo Imperial University. After graduation, she stayed on at the university as a professor. In 1918, she became a professor of Japanese language and literature at Tokyo Woman's Christian University. She participated in the founding of Bunka Gakuin, served as its inaugural professor, and taught at the institution for over 20 years. She was also active in the campaigns for women's suffrage and women's rights.

In 1947, she was elected to the House of Councillors as a representative of the Japan Socialist Party, and subsequently served for six years in welfare work. In November 1966, she died of a cerebral hemorrhage.
