= Tanino Setsu =

Japanese textile worker and labor activist

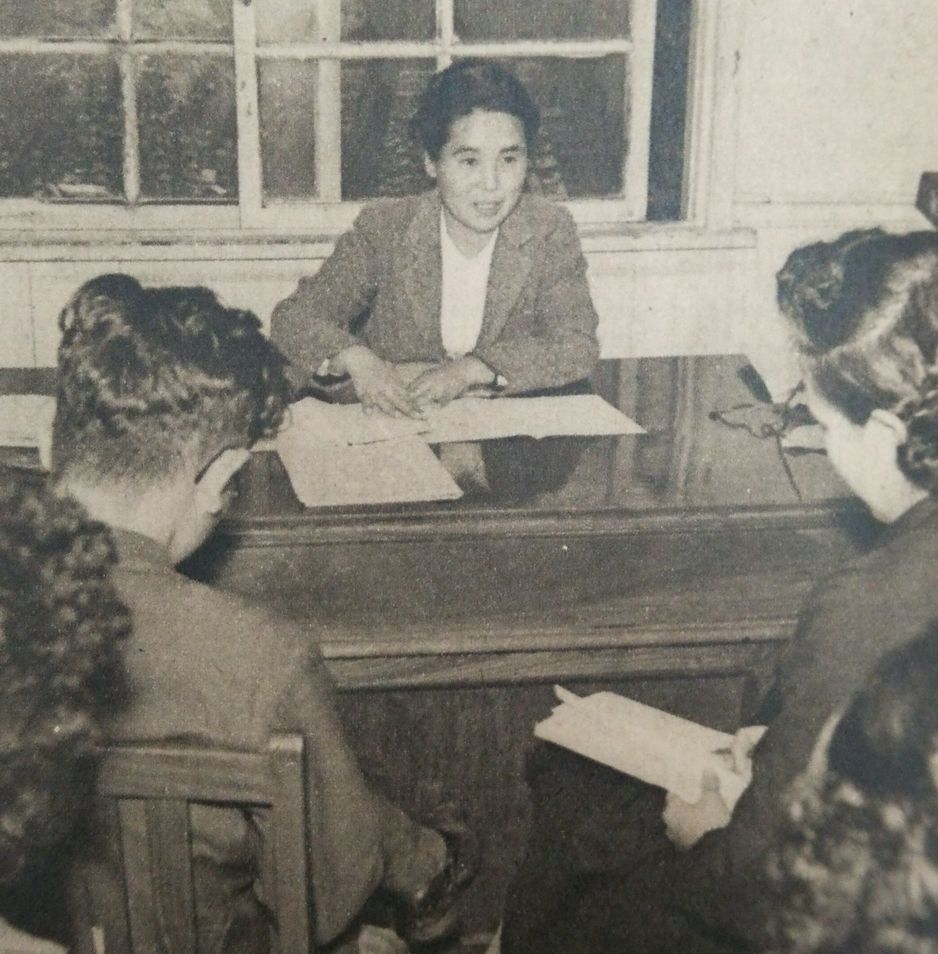
- Born: 1903; Chiba, Japan

Tanino Setsu (谷野せつ) was a textile worker who graduated from Japan Women's University's Department of Social Work in 1925, and became the first female factory supervisor in 1928. She aided in organizing women's strikes for higher wages, and wrote prolifically about her observances of female factory worker's struggles.
