= Jiyu Gakuen Girls' School =

Building in Tokyo, Japan

Jiyu Gakuen School Myonichikan
- 自由学園明日館
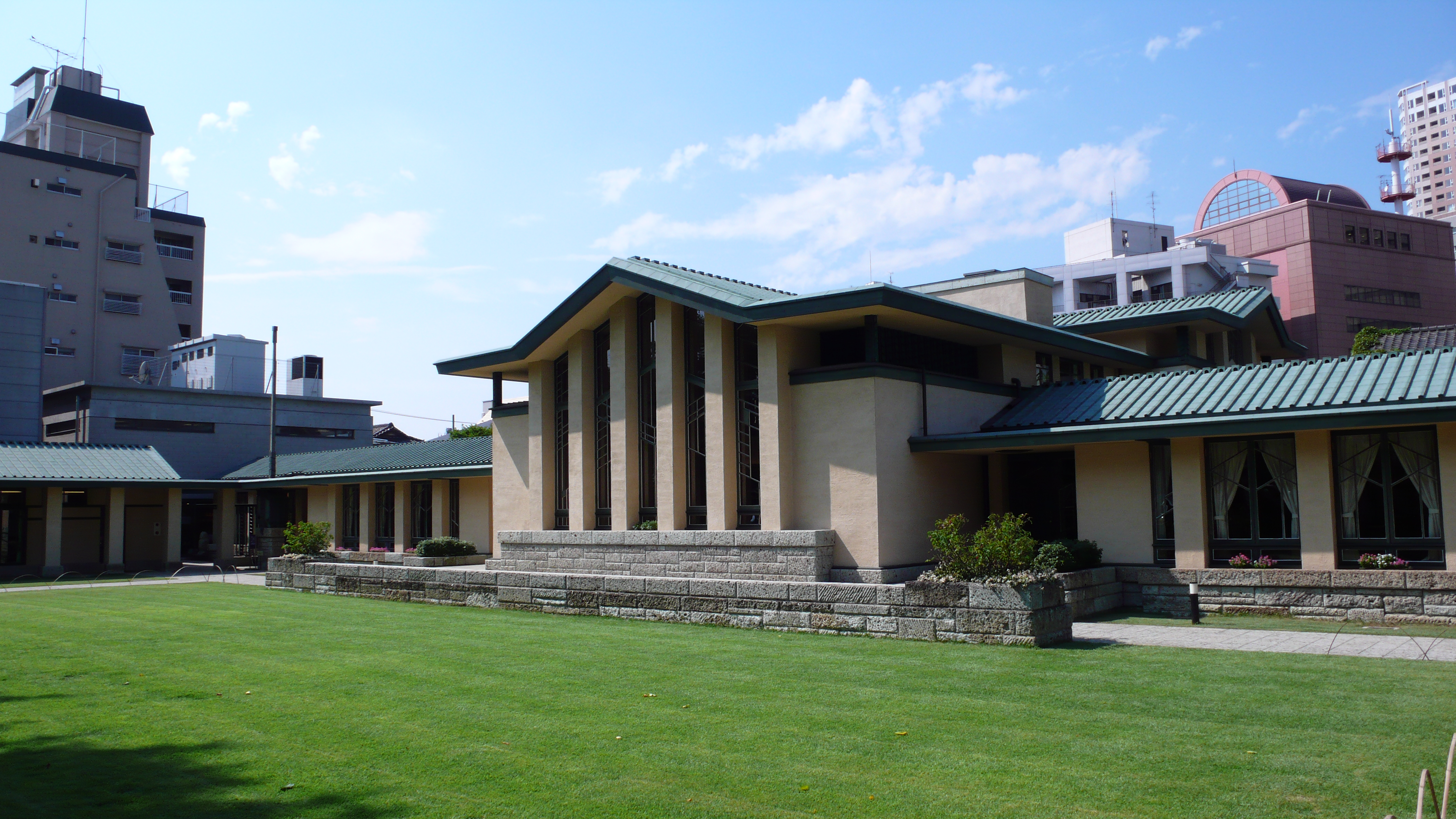
- Jiyu Gakuen School, Tokyo, Japan. Designed by Frank Lloyd Wright in 1921
- Interactive map of the Jiyu Gakuen School Myonichikan area

General information
- Location: Toshima, Tokyo, Japan
- Coordinates: 35°43′35″N 139°42′25″E
- Completed: 1921
- Client: Motoko and Yoshikazu Hani

Design and construction
- Architect: Frank Lloyd Wright

Jiyu Gakuen School Myonichikan (自由学園明日館) is a building in Toshima, Tokyo, designed by American architect Frank Lloyd Wright for the Jiyu Gakuen School. Jiyu (自由) means 'freedom', and gakuen (学園) is 'school'.

Arata Endo, working as an assistant for Wright's project constructing the Imperial Hotel, introduced Wright to his acquaintances, husband and wife Yoshikazu and Motoko Hani, who founded Jiyu Gakuen. Impressed by the couple's self-reliant, Christian-oriented educational philosophy, Wright accepted to undertake the design of their new school.

Built of economical 2 × 4 wood and plaster, Jiyu Gakuen featured a central section with double-height volume and soaring windows facing south onto an open courtyard, with symmetrical wings on the east and west. It was built to child scale, with an architectural richness belying its budget. Myonichikan is also given a Japanese touch by Wright's extensive use of gray-green Oya stone (from Tochigi Prefecture) for pavements, columns and the lanterns standing in the corridors.

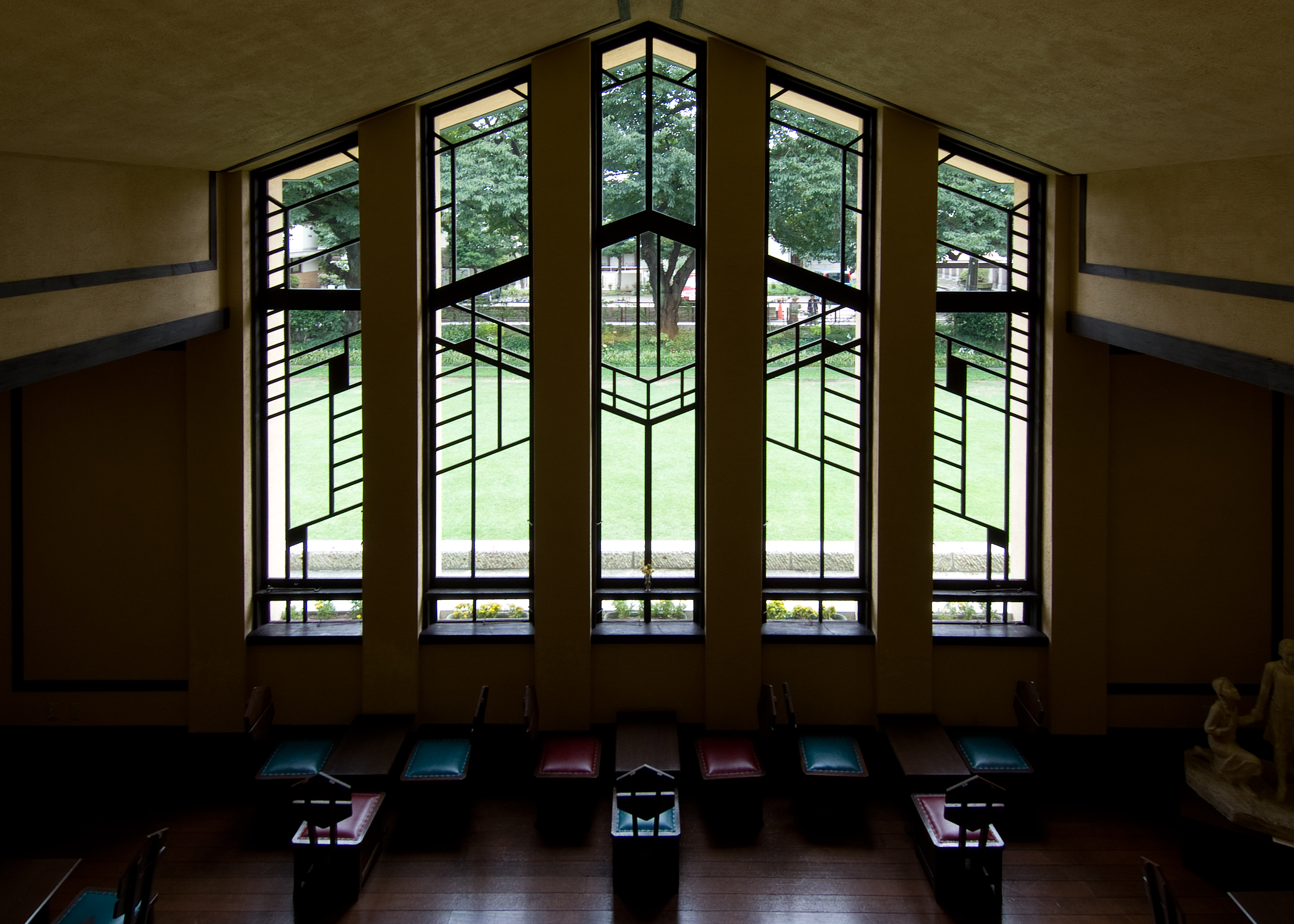

The Myonichikan consists of four buildings; the main, the east, and the west buildings and the auditorium. The main building stands with the two classroom buildings to the west and the east forming a U-shape. The buildings have such characteristics as extending horizontal lines to blend with the landscape, the Prairie School design, which can be seen in Wright's first golden age. The auditorium, designed by Arata Endo and capable of seating around 300 people, stands across the street to the south of the site.

After the main campus was relocated to Minamisawa (Higashikurume, Tokyo) in 1934, the original buildings were used by school alumni for various activities. A long dispute to save the aging structure took place within the Japanese government in the 1990s. The government rewrote its regulations so that the building could be used for educational and cultural activities after being designated a National Important Cultural Asset in May 1997. After standing for almost 80 years, the building was in need of major repairs. Therefore, restoration work was conducted from January 1999 through September 2001. Since November 2001, it has been open to the public when not in use for weddings and other events.

Along with Yodokō Guest House in Ashiya, the school is also the only other example of Wright's work in Japan to completely retain its original appearance.

== See also ==
- List of Frank Lloyd Wright works
