= Yoko Matsuoka McClain =

Japanese-born American scholar (1924–2011)

Yoko Matsuoka McClain (January 1, 1924 – November 2, 2011) was a Japanese-born American professor of Japanese language and literature at the University of Oregon. She was the granddaughter of Japanese novelist, Natsume Sōseki, from her maternal lineage.

McClain was born Yoko Matsuoka in Tokyo. She graduated from Tsuda College in 1945 and found work as a translator during the Occupation of Japan by the Americans following World War II. She obtained a scholarship, the forebear of the Fulbright Program, to study at the University of Oregon. As a student, Matsuoka worked as a receptionist for the University of Oregon's art museum, now called the Jordan Schnitzer Museum of Art. She received a bachelor's degree in French from the University of Oregon in 1956 and a master's degree in comparative literature in 1967.

McClain taught Japanese literature at the University of Oregon from 1964 to 1994, when she became a professor emeritus. She authored more than a dozen books and scholarly works on Japanese studies. Her husband, George Robert McClain, collected Japanese prints and art, which she donated to Jordan Schnitzer Museum of Art following his death.

The Japanese Minister of Foreign Affairs honored McClain for her contributions to Japanese-U.S. cultural relations in 2003. The University of Oregon College of Arts and Sciences also awarded her the Alumni Fellows Award in 2003. In August 2011, McClain received the Gertrude Bass Warner Award from the Jordan Schnitzer Museum of Art.

McClain died from a stroke on November 2, 2011, aged 87.
