= Kiyoko Tanaka =

Japanese pianist (1932–1996)

Kiyoko Tanaka たなか きよこ
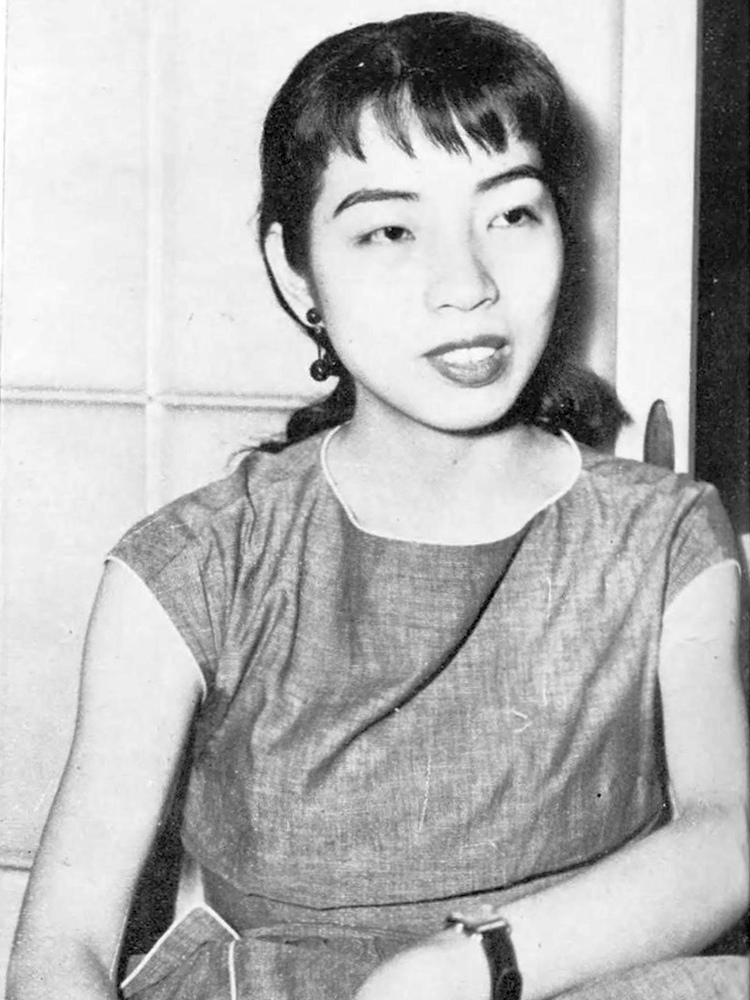
- Tanaka in 1955

Background information
- Born: February 5, 1932; Tokyo, Empire of Japan
- Died: February 26, 1996 (aged 64) Nerima, Tokyo, Japan
- Education: Conservatoire de Paris
- Occupations: Pianist; music educator
- Years active: 1949–1970

Kiyoko Tanaka (田中 希代子; February 5, 1932 [Shōwa 7] – February 26, 1996 [Heisei 8]) was a Japanese pianist and teacher. She was the first Japanese musician to take a leading prize at a major international competition, sharing second prize with Ingrid Haebler at the Geneva International Music Competition in 1952. She went on to become the first Japanese prizewinner at both the Long-Thibaud Competition in 1953 and the International Chopin Piano Competition in 1955. Based successively in Paris and Vienna, Tanaka toured Europe, Japan and South America through the 1950s and 1960s.

Her career was cut short in her late thirties by the onset of a connective tissue disease, forcing her to withdraw from public performances. Tanaka made her final orchestral appearance in 1968 and her last recital in 1970, at the age of 38. Afterwards, she taught piano in Tokyo by means of a wheelchair. She left very few commercial studio recordings, and her posthumous reputation rests largely on concert and broadcast tapes reissued from the late 1980s onward.

== Early life and education ==
Tanaka was born in Tokyo in 1932 into a musical family. Her father, Eito Tanaka, was a violinist and her mother, Nobue Tanaka, was a singer. Her younger brother Chikashi Tanaka became a violinist and served as concertmaster of the NHK Symphony Orchestra.

She began piano lessons at the age of four with a kindergarten teacher. From the age of seven, she studied with Motonari Iguchi, and from sixteen with the Paris-trained pianist Kazuko Yasukawa. In the intervening years, she also worked with Leonid Kreutzer, who had taken refuge in Chigasaki. She attended the elementary school and girls' high school attached to the Tokyo Women's Higher Normal School (now Ochanomizu University), interrupted by wartime evacuation, and left the high school in 1946 after completing the coursework required to sit the entrance examination for the Tokyo Music School. After the Japanese educational reform of 1947, the school was converted into the Tokyo University of the Arts, which would have required her to re-enroll in a new-system high school before applying, causing her to abandon plans for further study in Japan.

Tanaka instead entered the Japan Music Competition, becoming a finalist in the 17th competition in 1948 and taking second prize with a special distinction in the 18th edition in 1949.

== Career ==
=== Paris and the international competitions ===
In 1950, on Yasukawa's recommendation, Tanaka was chosen as one of the first postwar Japanese recipients of a French government scholarship and sailed for Europe, arriving in Paris that September. She entered the Conservatoire de Paris, where she studied for two years with Lazare Lévy and graduated with honors, a premier prix, in 1951. She devoted a further year to chamber music with Maurice Hewitt and to music theory with Pierre Revel. Shortly after her arrival, she contracted tuberculosis and spent much of her first years in France convalescing, with her practice restricted to an hour a day.

At the 1952 Geneva competition, in which no first prize was awarded, Tanaka shared second prize with the Austrian pianist Ingrid Haebler. It was the first time that a Japanese musician had taken a leading prize at a major international competition, and the result was reported in Japan as a landmark for the country's musical life. Tanaka subsequently introduced her compatriot Takahiro Sonoda, who had not advanced at Geneva, to Marguerite Long, with whom he then studied.

She gave her Paris debut recital at the Salle Gaveau in 1953 and took fourth prize at the Long-Thibaud Competition the same year, again the first Japanese competitor to be placed. In 1955, she was awarded tenth prize at the V International Chopin Piano Competition in Warsaw, becoming the first Japanese pianist to win a prize there. The 1955 results were contested within the jury: according to the music journalist Kosaka Haruka, the juror Arturo Benedetti Michelangeli argued that the runner-up Vladimir Ashkenazy should have won ahead of Adam Harasiewicz and that Tanaka should have been ranked more highly, and he refused to sign any of the prize diplomas. Japanese media hailed her prizewinning appearance at the competition as a major first for the nation, but incorrectly described her as the first Japanese to have entered the competition at all, despite the fact that Chieko Hara, and Miwa Kai had competed eighteen years earlier at the II International Chopin Piano Competition in 1937.

=== International career ===
Tanaka returned to Japan in triumph in 1955 and gave a homecoming concert at the Hibiya Public Hall. The Fryderyk Chopin Institute records that between 1955 and 1957, she undertook several tours that established her internationally, with the European musical press describing her as one of the finest pianists of her generation, and that in 1958 she made "triumphant grand tour" of South America. She remained exceptionally popular at home, in some seasons giving as many as 120 concerts a year in Japan alone. Japanese commentators of the period nicknamed her the "genius girl of the Orient".

She was a frequent visitor to Poland after the Chopin Competition. Between May 14 and 19, 1957 she appeared four times in Warsaw, performing Ravel's Piano Concerto in G major among other works; one critic wrote that her manner of interpretation came closest to the French performing ideal represented by Monique Haas. She returned some years later with a recital of Couperin, Rameau, Chopin, Debussy and Ravel, and her performance of Saint-Saëns's Fifth Piano Concerto with the Warsaw Philharmonic was long remembered there.

Tanaka was based in Paris until 1959 and in Vienna from 1960, touring from Europe to South America. On June 13, 1966 she appeared with her brother Chikashi at the Tokyo Bunka Kaikan in a concert marking his appointment as concertmaster of the NHK Symphony Orchestra.

=== Illness and retirement ===
Tanaka returned to Japan in December 1967 intending a short visit, but fell ill and canceled a European tour scheduled for the turn of the year. Her fingers stiffened, her joints became painful, and she ran a persistent fever; an initial diagnosis of acute liver dysfunction brought on by overwork was later revised, after repeated examinations, to a connective tissue disease. She continued to perform with massage and analgesic injections directly into her hands, but in March 1968, playing Chopin's First Piano Concerto with the Kyoto Symphony Orchestra, she was forced to stop by the pain at the coda of the first movement and to restart the passage. It was her last appearance with an orchestra. After further deterioration she gave a final recital at the Nissay Theatre in 1970 and retired from performance. Her father died the same year.

== Teaching ==
Tanaka taught at the Kunitachi College of Music from 1973 and at the Toho Gakuen University from 1977, working largely from a wheelchair and, in her later years, giving her university lessons at home. In 1980, she suffered a stroke attributed to the side effects of her medication and was left paralyzed on her right side.

Recordings salvaged from Japanese, Polish and East German radio archives were issued on disc from 1987, and in 1989 the TBS Radio documentary Yoake no Chopin: Yomigaeru tensai pianist Tanaka Kiyoko ("Chopin at Daybreak: The Reawakening of the Genius Pianist Kiyoko Tanaka") was broadcast; it received an encouragement prize at the fifteenth Broadcasting Culture Foundation awards. In recognition of the reissues, Tanaka received the Special Prize of the third Nippon Steel Music Award for the 1992 fiscal year.

Tanaka was found collapsed from a cerebral hemorrhage at her Tokyo home on February 22, 1996 by a pupil who had come for a lesson, and died on the morning of February 26 at a hospital in Nerima, aged 64.

== Personal life ==
In 1956 Tanaka married the composer Mutsuo Shishido (1929–2007), then also studying in Paris. The demands of their separate careers kept them apart and they divorced in 1959, though they continued to work together as musicians; Tanaka was the soloist in Shishido's Concerto for Piano, Percussion and Orchestra, recorded in 1964 under Tadashi Mori.

Tanaka was an admirer of Clara Haskil and Wilhelm Backhaus. In the early 1960s, during a visit home, she was invited to play at the University of the Sacred Heart, Tokyo before the then Crown Princess Michiko, and the two spoke afterward; Tanaka kept a photograph taken on the occasion on her piano for the rest of her life. Michiko, by then empress, asked to hear a tape of the 1989 radio documentary, and on Tanaka's death sent a bouquet of flowers she had gathered herself with a message describing Tanaka's playing as a support to her.

== Recordings and legacy ==
Although Tanaka concertized intensively, she made very few authorized studio recordings: a collection of short pieces for Toshiba Records, a Debussy album and Mozart's Piano Sonata No. 11 for King Records, and a set of sonatinas for Nippon Columbia together amount to less than three and a half hours of music. Her stereo Debussy album of 1961 was widely admired in Japan, and its performances of Children's Corner, along with the Mozart sonata, were designated listening material for junior high school music classes under the Ministry of Education's revised curriculum guidelines. The only studio recording of a concerto known to survive is Mozart's Piano Concerto No. 24, taped in East Germany in May 1967 with the Berlin Radio Symphony Orchestra under Kurt Masur, six months before the onset of her illness.

Tanaka was reluctant during her lifetime to have her recordings reissued, but a memorial disc released by Yamano Music in 1996 renewed interest in her playing, and in 2005 the music critic Yukiko Hagitani published a biography, Tanaka Kiyoko: Yoake no pianist. On February 22, 2006, marking the tenth anniversary of her death, King Records issued the two-disc anthology Kiyoko Tanaka: Miracle of the Orient, combining her 1955 Chopin Competition performances with King and NHK material and archival interviews. Further reissues followed, including a 1965 Nippon Crown session first released on CD by King International in 2021.

== Bibliography ==
- Hagitani, Yukiko (2005). 田中希代子―夜明けのピアニスト [Kiyoko Tanaka: Pianist of the Dawn] (in Japanese). Tokyo: Chopin. ISBN 978-4-88364-189-5.
