= Chieko Hara =

Japanese pianist (1914–2001)

Chieko Hara はら ちえこ
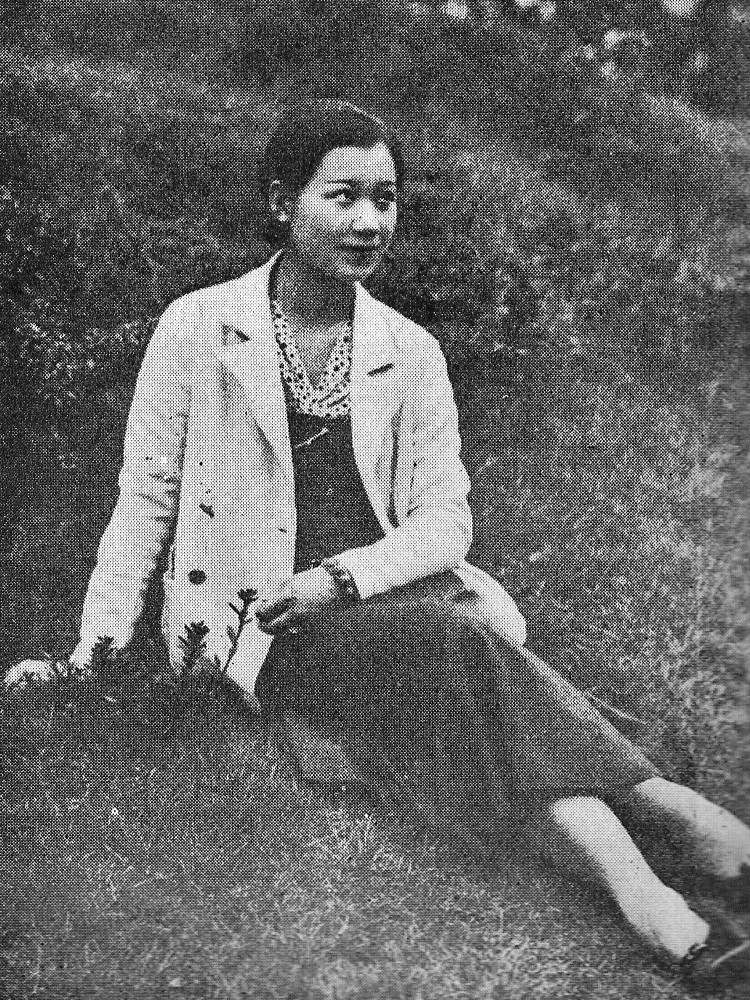
- Portrait in 1954

Background information
- Born: December 25, 1914; Kobe, Empire of Japan
- Died: December 9, 2001 (aged 86) Ōme, Tokyo, Japan
- Education: Conservatoire de Paris
- Years active: 1933–1984
- Spouse(s): Shirō Kawazoe (m. 1938; div. 1959); Gaspar Cassadó (m. 1959; died 1966)
- Award: Order of the Precious Crown (1987)

Chieko Hara (原 智恵子, Hara Chieko; December 25, 1914 [Taishō 3] – December 9, 2001 [Heisei 13]), known after her second marriage as Chieko Hara de Cassadó, was a Japanese pianist who later took Spanish citizenship. Trained in Paris from the age of thirteen, in 1932 she became the first Japanese pianist to graduate from the Conservatoire de Paris with a premier prix, where she studied under Lazare Lévy and Alfred Cortot. In 1937, she and Miwa Kai became the first entrants from an Asian country in the International Chopin Piano Competition.

Hara reached the final of the 1937 competition, enthralling the audience and performing in a kimono, but placed only fifteenth. The Warsaw audience protested her omission from the prize list, and a wealthy spectator endowed an "audience award" for her on the spot. The episode made her famous in Japan, where she was among the most widely admired concert pianists of the pre-war and wartime years. Her assertiveness and her European manner nonetheless set her against the Tokyo critics, a conflict that hardened over two decades and eventually cost her a place in Japanese musical life. She returned to Europe in 1953, married the Spanish cellist Gaspar Cassadó in 1959, and toured widely with him as the Duo Cassadó until his death in 1966.

In 1969, she founded the Gaspar Cassadó International Violoncello Competition in Florence, organizing ten editions before ill health forced her to end it in 1990. By the 1970s, Hara's name had been dropped from Japanese reference works on pianists, and she spent her last decade in Japan in obscurity. A biography published within days of her death revived public interest in her life and work, and her musical recordings were reissued to a new audience. She was awarded the Order of the Precious Crown in May 1987.

== Early life and education ==
=== Kobe and Tokyo ===
Hara was born in the Suma-ku ward of Kobe on December 25, 1914, the fourth child of Kumetarō and Hisako Hara. Her father had studied engineering at Harvard University as a young man, acquiring a taste for classical music there, and was chief engineer of the Kawasaki Shipbuilding Corporation at the time of her birth. Her mother taught the koto and shamisen at home and had been educated at Kobe College. The family's friends included the novelist Takeo Arishima and his brother, the painter Ikuma Arishima.

From the age of seven, Hara studied with the Spanish pianist Villaverde, (Note: Ando gives his forename as Petillo; Japanese sources render it Pedro.) who had settled in Kobe and who taught in the French tradition. Villaverde's teaching style differed from the German one then standard in Japan, where instruction was built on Ferdinand Beyer's exercises and prized accuracy and speed above expression. Villaverde introduced her to Debussy, Ravel, Chopin and the Spanish repertoire, and took her to hear visiting artists including Jascha Heifetz and Mischa Levitzki when they performed in Kobe. Convinced of her ability, he urged her father to send her abroad.

The family moved to Tokyo in 1924 in search of better opportunities. Having no musical contacts of his own, Kumetarō asked Ikuma Arishima for help; Arishima assembled a group of leading critics, among them Kōichi Nomura and Keizō Horiuchi, to hear her play. They were struck by her expressiveness and, believing that further study in Tokyo would blunt it, advised that she be sent to Europe for instruction. In 1925, the touring French pianist Henri Gil-Marchex heard her and invited Hara to study with him in Paris.

=== Paris ===
In the spring of 1928, Hara sailed from Yokohama to Marseille with Arishima and his seventeen-year-old daughter Akiko. Gil-Marchex began teaching her at once, but her lack of solfège and poor understanding of French made progress difficult. He suggested she enroll instead at the École Normale de Musique de Paris, where he taught. Hara left his studio, and Arishima placed her with the Chatenays, a wealthy banking family whose daughter agreed to prepare her for a conservatory entrance examination.

Over the two years that followed, the Chatenay daughter drilled her in solfège, dictation, and French language. She rebuilt Hara's technique, concentrating on wrist movement and on producing dynamic range through the speed of the arm rather than muscular force. Hara practiced at least six hours a day. She also attended concerts constantly, paying particular attention to how women performers carried themselves on stage.

Hara had intended to study with Alfred Cortot at the École Normale, but changed course when Sylvain Lévi, the indologist who directed the research institute at the Maison franco-japonaise in Tokyo, urged her to sit the examination for the Conservatoire de Paris and introduced her to Lazare Lévy. She entered in the autumn of 1930, placing second among 150 candidates, of whom twelve were admitted. Japanese students at the Conservatoire were then almost unheard of; the first had been the composition student Tomojirō Ikenouchi, who became a close friend to Hara.

Lévy taught her in thirty-minute weekly lessons, emphasizing fingering as the route to an unlabored technique and pressing her to read widely and live fully in order to mature as a musician. Finding the lessons too short, she resumed regular work with Chatenay alongside them. At the Conservatoire, a student had to take a premier prix at the annual competition in order to graduate. In June 1932, at her second attempt, Hara played Schumann's Symphonic Studies before a jury and audience, sight-read, and was judged the best of the field, becoming the first Japanese pianist to take the prize.

Custom held that a premier prix winner would stay on as an assistant to a senior artist while preparing a début recital, and both Cortot and Lévy offered to support her if she remained in Paris. Her parents and Arishima, who had already arranged a Tokyo concert, took a different view; a telegram informing her that her passage had been paid settled the matter, and she returned to Japan in the autumn.

== Career ==
=== Tokyo début and return to Paris ===
Hara's arrival in October 1932 was covered in every newspaper. She was reluctant to be rushed onto a stage, having told Arishima that she feared the Japanese press, which in her view seized on novelties and tired of them quickly, and she bridled at being described as a prodigy. Her début at the Hibiya Public Hall on February 9, 1933, drew a capacity audience for a programme of Bach, Beethoven, Chopin, Debussy, Schumann and Liszt.

Most notices were favorable, but two lines of criticism appeared that would follow her for the rest of her Japanese career: Jiji Shinpō faulted her program for want of display, and another reviewer complained that she looked too much at ease on the platform, where a young woman was expected to appear modest. Japanese taste of the period favored velocity and cleanness over interpretation, and her manner of playing—and of presenting herself—cut against both mores.

Determined to return to Europe but without the means to do so, Hara was rescued by two encounters. In 1933, she played at a farewell reception for André Honnorat, a former French Minister of Public Instruction then visiting Japan, who spoke to the French ambassador and arranged a scholarship for her. In April 1935, she met Arthur Rubinstein on his first Japanese tour and was invited to call on him if she ever needed assistance.

After returning to Paris, she became Cortot's student. His teaching was as much about breadth of experience as about the keyboard: he sent her to exhibitions and operas and told her that reading and living would do more for her playing than practice alone. Her Paris début in December 1936, in which she played Beethoven's Third Piano Concerto under the baton of Paul Paray, was a success, and it prompted Lazare Lévy to suggest that she enter the Chopin Competition in Warsaw.

=== 1937 Chopin Competition ===
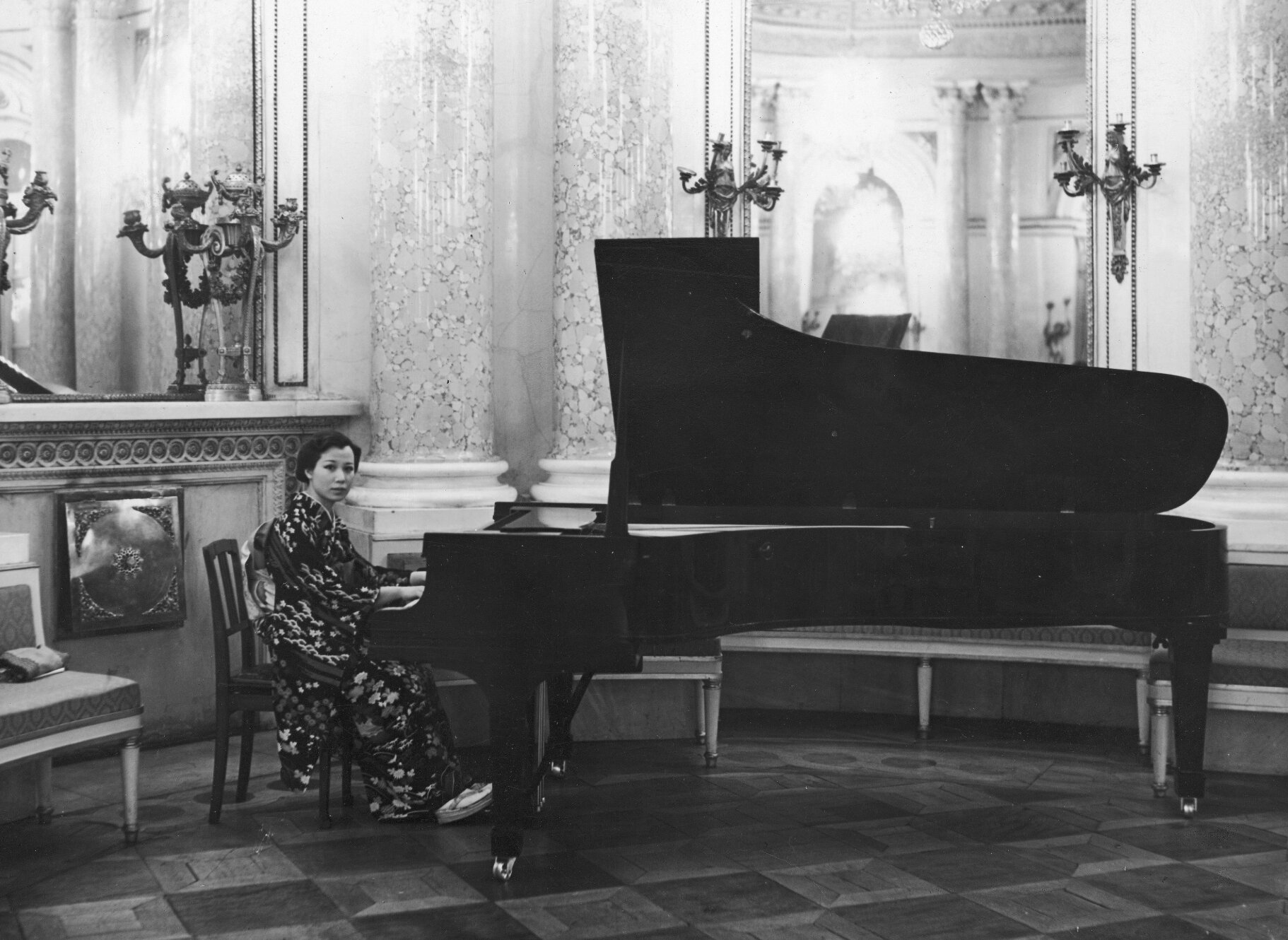
Hara at the piano at the 3rd International Chopin Competition

Preparing her program for the competition, Hara struggled with the mazurka and took up Rubinstein's offer of assistance. He explained the dance forms underlying the genre and played the piece for her, and she found afterwards that she could hear the grief in it more directly.

The III International Chopin Piano Competition ran in Warsaw from February 21 to March 13, 1937, the largest edition at that time. Of the 250 applicants, eighty were admitted, and a jury of thirty drawn from a dozen countries. (Note: Sources differ on the number of countries represented: the Fryderyk Chopin Institute's English materials give twenty-two, while Polish sources and Ando give twenty-one.) Among the jurors were Wilhelm Backhaus, Emil von Sauer and Hara's own Paris teacher, Lazare Lévy. Hara and Miwa Kai were the first Japanese entrants in the competition's history and, according to its organizers, the first from any Asian country. Hara performed in a kimono and became an audience favorite.

She reached the final, but when the results were read out, she had placed fifteenth. The hall, which had waited until the small hours of morning for the verdict, erupted, and security was called in. Order was restored when Stanisław Meyer, a wealthy industrialist in the audience, endowed an award for Hara there and then, framed as a prize for the best non-European competitor. The Fryderyk Chopin Institute records her as having received a distinction. During the competition, the participants were received by President Ignacy Mościcki at the Royal Castle, where Hara played.

The result was reported in Japan as a national success. However, it would later be written out of the record: when Kiyoko Tanaka became the first Japanese pianist to win a prize at the competition, Japanese musical authorities described her as the first Japanese to have entered it at all.

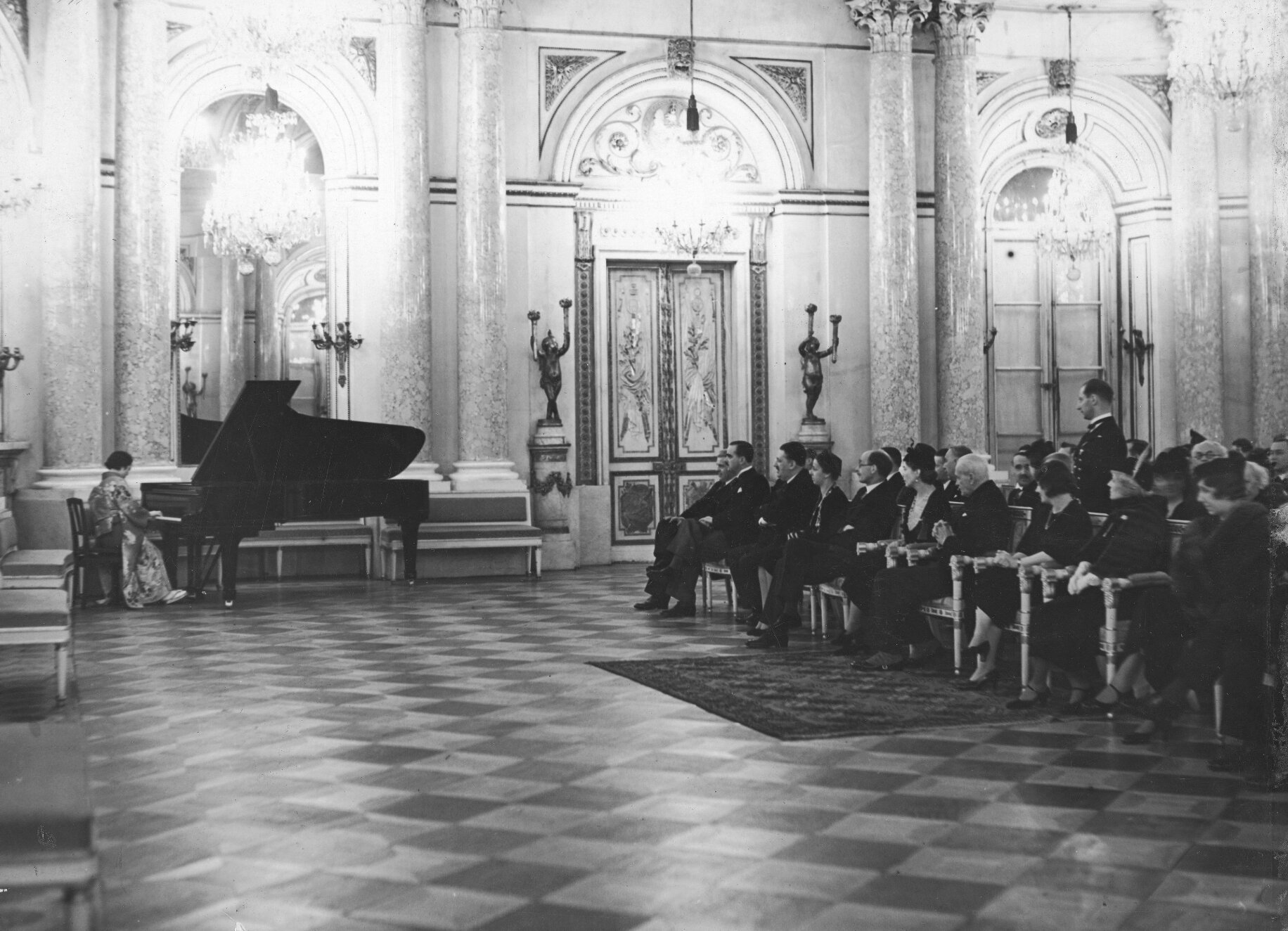
Hara performing at the Royal Castle in Warsaw (fourth from right: President Ignacy Mościcki)

=== War and post-war Japan ===
Hara married Shirō Kawazoe in Japan later in 1938 and returned with him to Paris, where an agent taken on after the competition kept her in concert engagements touring Germany, Italy and Poland. At the same time, the Japanese press began setting her against Kazuko Yasukawa, a younger pianist raised in Paris who had entered the Conservatoire at eleven and studied with the same teacher. The comparison, encouraged by the rival Japanese circles of the Left and Right Banks, would shadow both women for decades. The couple stayed in Paris until the German invasion of France and left in July 1940, weeks before the occupation.

Settled in a Meguro house provided by Kawazoe's father, Hara gave a comeback recital within a month of arriving and was received warmly. Kawazoe, unable to establish a career of his own, marketed hers, at one point advertising her as the winner of the Chopin Competition rather than its fifteenth-placed finalist, a distortion she found humiliating. She bore two sons, Shōrō in 1941 and Mitsurō in 1943, and continued to perform throughout the war, latterly confined to appearances at the German embassy and on national radio. In May 1945, she and her sons fled the Bombing of Tokyo to the foot of Mount Fuji, where she met the soprano Tamaki Miura, then in her sixties and singing to encourage refugees. Hara, whose own career had drawn the same charge of putting art before family, took the older woman as a model.

After the surrender, the occupation authorities encouraged new radio formats, among them a request program for which the Japan Broadcasting Corporation (NHK) chose Hara as its first performer; still grieving her father, she played the Moonlight Sonata, the piece listeners had asked for most. Her career recovered quickly, but her standing among critics did not. She declined a chair at the Tokyo University of the Arts, which then went to Kazuko Yasukawa. Kyoshi Takahama, whose son Ikenouchi she had refused in marriage, used his authority in the arts against her, and when NHK gave its 1950 New Year concert to Yasukawa instead of her, she cancelled her involvement altogether. Lazare Lévy's month-long visit to Japan that year gave critics a fresh opportunity to compare the two pianists to Hara's disadvantage, and Nomura, who had championed her since childhood, published a magazine attack on her playing shortly afterwards.

=== Return to Europe ===
Post-war currency controls and exit permits made foreign travel almost impossible for private citizens, and Hara was able to leave only after Lévy secured her an invitation in 1952 to judge the Conservatoire's graduation competition. Financial support came from Susumi Itakura, an old friend then heading the European bureau of the Mainichi Shimbun, with whom she lodged after reaching Paris in July 1953.

Her comeback concert at the Palais de Chaillot in November 1953 made her the first Japanese pianist to appear in Paris after the war, and she played the Beethoven concerto of her 1936 début, gave five encores, and was praised in Paris-Presse. A recital at the Salle Gaveau the following November, attended by diplomats, the cellist Maurice Maréchal and Lévy, was received with equal warmth. However, critics from Japan remained hostile; a reviewer claimed that she was an elitist and would be poorly received in her own country.

In July 1953, judging that same Conservatoire competition, Hara met the cellist Gaspar Cassadó. He introduced her to Count Guido Chigi Saracini, founder of the Accademia Musicale Chigiana in Siena, whose patronage opened much of European musical society to her.

=== Kobe College ===
Hara returned to Japan in the autumn of 1955 and gave recitals in Tokyo the following February; the critics ignored both her European successes and the concerts themselves. Itakura, who had mediated between her and the press, died in October 1956. Judging that further public appearances would only damage her standing, she turned to teaching.

She held a professorship at Kobe College from April 1957 to March 1961, having turned down offers from universities in Tokyo including the Tokyo University of the Arts. She had given concerts for the college in 1935 and 1951 through her mother's connection with the institution. According to the musicologist Motomi Tsugami, the autumn of 1955 marked a turning point at which Hara concluded that she should pass on her training to a younger generation, as Lazare Lévy had done. The college approached her in 1956 with terms that allowed her to continue performing, and she visited on November 2 that year to give a short concert. She selected three pupils by audition for 1957 and a fourth for 1958, teaching them once a month, and in the spring of 1958 four alumnae appeared as concerto soloists billed as her pupils. Her name remained on the college's curricula for 1959 and 1960 with a note that she was abroad.

=== Duo Cassadó ===
When the Asahi Shimbun launched the Osaka International Festival in 1958, Hara approached the organizers and secured an invitation for Cassadó. He spent a month in Japan giving nine concerts, among them a private performance with Hara for the Emperor Hirohito and Empress Nagako. The visit brought his feelings for her into the open at a point when her marriage with Kawazoe was collapsing.

Hara left Japan for Florence on December 3, 1958, moving into Cassadó's apartment at the top of a thirteenth-century tower near the Ponte Vecchio. The couple married in the spring of 1959, with a church ceremony following at Siena, where Count Chigi acted as witness. Hara was 44 years of age, and Cassadó 61. (Note: Ando gives April 26, 1959, as the wedding date; Japanese accounts treat that date as the engagement and place the marriage on May 9.)

Performing as the Duo Cassadó, the two toured Europe and the United States continuously. Cassadó, himself an accomplished pianist, coached her through three years of retraining, improving her pedalling and her reading of scores, and even opening repertoire she had not played, including works by Girolamo Frescobaldi, Bach, Fauré, Enrique Granados, and later Manuel de Falla and Isaac Albéniz. Hara described the process as an education, saying that after three years she felt she could finally breathe with him. Reviewers in New York praised her expressiveness, and on that tour she was reunited with her elder son, who came unannounced to her Town Hall recital in Manhattan.

The duo's Japanese tour in the autumn of 1962 marked a partial reconciliation with her home country. Her fee was roughly three times what Yasukawa commanded, effectively that of a foreign artist, and the notices were good; she was treated as Cassadó's partner rather than his accompanist, and the writer Michiko Inukai wrote that the hardness critics had once heard in her playing had given way to warmth.

Their pace took a toll on both of them: Cassadó's heart disease and diabetes worsened through the 1963 season, and Hara underwent surgery in December 1964. Count Chigi died in November 1965, and the Arno flood of November 1966 ruined the instruments and art Cassadó kept in his basement. On December 24, 1966, after a further heart attack, he died in Madrid.

=== Later years ===
Hara's attempts to rebuild a solo career failed both in Europe and Japan, where audiences ceased to recognize her name, and where Yasukawa and Motonari Iguchi led the profession. She continued to teach privately, and her pupil Masako Nakai later recorded her insistence that a performer should attend to what an audience had heard rather than to her own errors, and that bearing and appearance were part of the art. When Nomura published a survey of Japanese pianists in 1973 that omitted her entirely, Hara wrote to a friend that it was as though she had never existed; her name subsequently disappeared from Japanese music reference books.

In 1969, Hara established the Gaspar Cassadó International Violoncello Competition in Florence on behalf of her husband. She recruited Andrés Segovia, Federico Mompou, Yehudi Menuhin, Rubinstein, and Hideo Saito as founding patrons, chose the juries, and canvassed conservatories worldwide. The first competition opened at the Teatro Comunale in Florence on June 20, 1969. It quickly became a recognized entry point for young cellists, with its best-known winner being Mischa Maisky, who won first prize at the third competition. Hara also mediated between The Yomiuri Shimbun newspaper and Sviatoslav Richter, whose first Japanese tour had stalled over two years of negotiation. After her intervention, Richter gave nineteen concerts in Japan in the autumn of 1970.

On February 16, 1984, while visiting Japan, Hara was struck by a car and injured her hand. The effects were permanent and effectively ended her hopes of performing again, though she said little about it publicly. In May 1987, she received the Order of the Precious Crown, awarded for founding and sustaining the Cassadó competition rather than for her career as a pianist. She sat on the jury of the Clara Haskil International Piano Competition in 1985 and 1987.

The tenth and last Florence competition took place in June 1990. That summer, after friends in Florence noticed changes in Hara's behavior and alerted her family, her sons brought her back to Japan, ending thirty-two years of European residence. A cerebral thrombosis left her with impaired speech and memory: when her biographer visited in 1996, Hara could no longer answer in Japanese, but responded in Italian when spoken to about Florence.

Hara died at a hospital in Ōme, Tokyo, on December 9, 2001, at the age of 86. Her second son was chief mourner.

== Recordings ==
Hara recorded 78 rpm discs in Paris before the war, and the Duo Cassadó made LPs in Europe and Japan in the early 1960s. These were out of print by the end of her life, although Nippon Columbia reissued the duo material on CD in 1997—among it Gaspar Cassadó Plays Encores, taped in Tokyo in 1962 and reissued for the centenary of his birth—and again in the 2000s, alongside compilations of her solo playing. Relative to her reputation as a performer, her surviving discography is small.

== Personal life ==
Hara met Shirō Kawazoe in Paris in the mid-1930s. As the illegitimate son of Japanese noble Takētarō Gotō and grandson of the Meiji statesman Gotō Shōjirō, he came from a wealthy family and was raised as the adopted son of Kiyomaro Kawazoe. He worked as a facilitator of cultural exchange between France and Japan. His attentiveness and unconventionality appealed to her, and she accepted his marriage proposal despite the disapproval of her father, Cortot, and Arishima, all of whom doubted he could support her career. They married on November 25, 1938. Their elder son, Shōrō Kawazoe (1941–2024), was a music producer, and their second son, Mitsurō, later took over Chianti, the Italian restaurant that Shirō opened in Tokyo in 1960.

The marriage deteriorated during the war years, and by the mid-1950s Kawazoe was living with Kajiko Iwamoto, a translator he had met in Italy while touring with a kabuki company. He pressed for a divorce, which Hara resisted for her sons' sake before agreeing after Cassadó's 1958 visit. She placed the boys in a Catholic boarding school in Kagoshima, telling them only that she would be touring for a couple of years, and left for Italy that December. The Japanese press cast her as a woman who had abandoned her children for a foreign lover, passing over both her husband's infidelity and the fact that he had sought the divorce; her sons learned of her remarriage from a newspaper, and it took years to repair the relationship. She was thereafter based mainly in Europe and acquired Spanish citizenship.

== Legacy ==
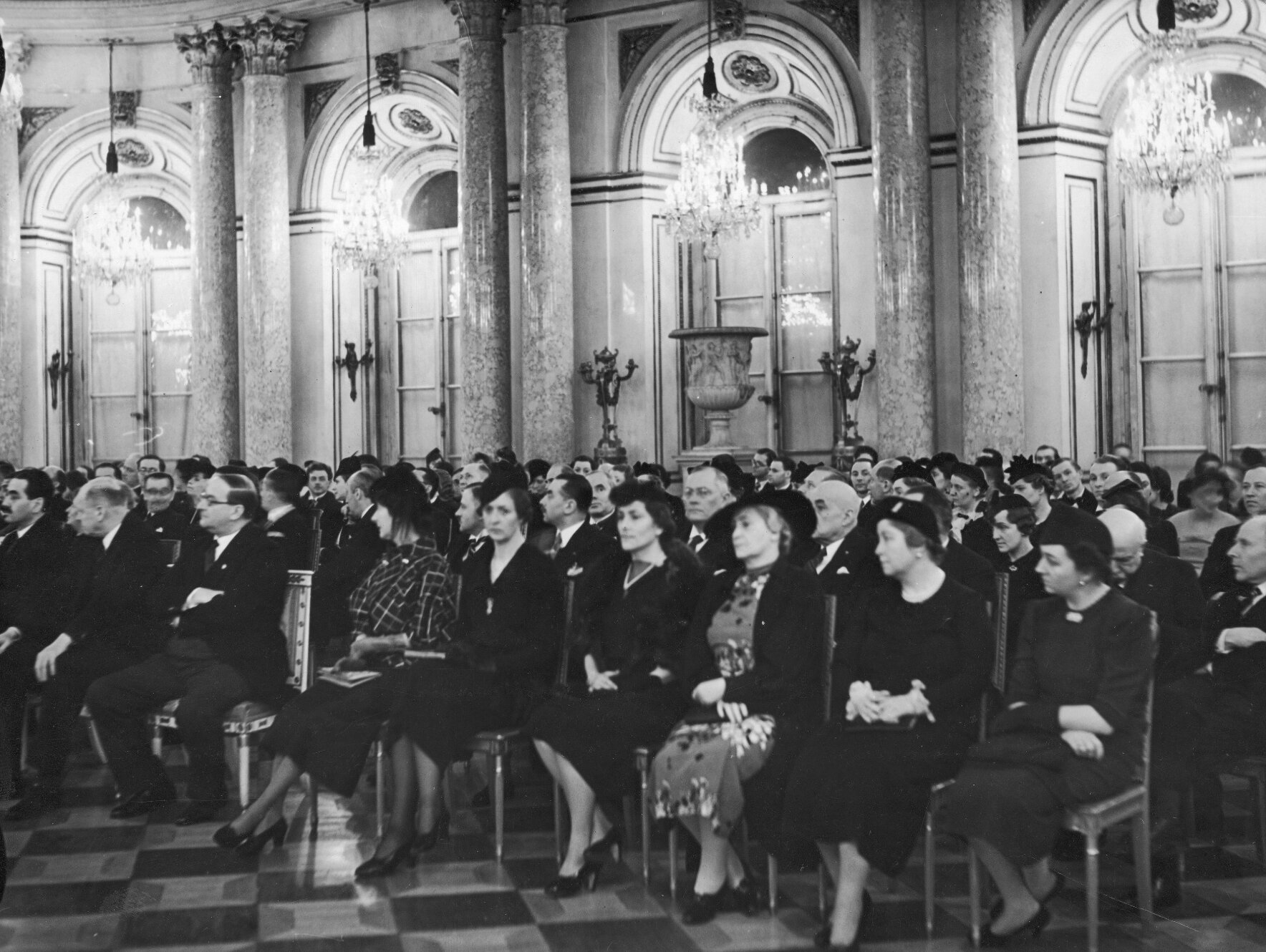
Polish audience listening to Hara (1937)

Yasuko Ishikawa's biography Hara Chieko: Densetsu no Pianisuto ("Chieko Hara: A Legendary Pianist") appeared in December 2001, days after her death, and spread her name in Japan for the first time in decades. Multiple reissues of her piano recordings followed. A further biography, running to more than 600 pages, was published by Daijirō Terasaki in 2021 and revised in 2024. Its author set out to explain how a pianist so well established in Europe had become, in his phrase, a "solitary figure" at home in Japan.

In 1997, Hara gave her piano and harpsichord, together with Cassadó's scores and papers—among them his arrangement of Franz Schubert's Arpeggione Sonata—to Tamagawa University in Tokyo, which held a commemorative concert. In 2004, a manuscript of Bach's wedding cantata Vergnügte Pleißenstadt, BWV 216, was found among effects she had not given to the university. Acquired by Cassadó from the family of Felix Mendelssohn, it was authenticated by Tadashi Isoyama of the Kunitachi College of Music.

The remainder of the estate, comprising Cassadó's personal papers and compositions, passed to the university's Museum of Education. A cataloguing project began in 2012, and the museum mounted a special exhibition, concert and symposium in 2016 to mark publication of the catalogue. Because much of the collection remains difficult to consult, it has become the focus of Lost in Plain Sight, a research project by the cellist Katie Tertell and the cultural historian Rosi Song of Durham University, who visited Tamagawa in 2024 seeking to make the archive more widely accessible.

The Cassadó competition was revived at Hachiōji in November 2006, sixteen years after the last Florence edition, by a citizens' organizing committee acting on Hara's wish that it continue in Japan.

== Works cited ==
- Ando, Rie (2010). Chieko Hara: A Life and Art (DMA thesis). University of Washington. ProQuest 3421551.
