= Miwa Kai =

Japanese-American pianist and librarian (1913–2011)

Miwa Kai かい みわ、
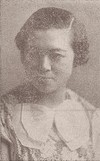
- Portrait in 1939

Background information
- Born: Miwako Kai; May 24, 1913; San Francisco, California, U.S.
- Died: December 10, 2011 (aged 98) Manhattan, New York, U.S.
- Education: Tōyō Eiwa Jogakuin
- Occupations: Pianist; librarian
- Years active: 1932–1983
- Awards: Order of the Precious Crown (4th class, 1995)

Miwako Kai (かい みわこ; May 24, 1913 [Taishō 2] – December 10, 2011 [Heisei 23]) was a Japanese-American pianist and librarian. Raised between San Francisco and Tokyo, she came to national attention in Japan in 1932 when she was awarded the Grand Prize at the first Music Competition, an honor conferred above the individual divisional prizes and never given to anyone else. Together with Chieko Hara, she took part in the third International Chopin Piano Competition in 1937, becoming the first competitors from an Asian country in the history of the event.

Living in San Francisco when the attack on Pearl Harbor brought the United States into World War II, Kai was forcibly interned in 1942, first at the Santa Anita Assembly Center in California and then at the Topaz War Relocation Center in Utah.

After her release, she settled in New York and joined the Columbia University Libraries, where she spent nearly four decades developing the Japanese-language holdings of the East Asian Library, now the C.V. Starr East Asian Library, heading the Japanese collection from 1945 until her retirement in 1983. In 1995, the Government of Japan awarded her the Order of the Precious Crown in recognition of her contributions to Japanese studies and to cultural exchange between the two countries.

== Early life and education ==
Kai was born on May 24, 1913, in San Francisco, California, into a family of Japanese merchants. Her grandfather, Orie Kai, was an early student of Fukuzawa Yukichi and managed the New York branch of a silk and tea importing house before founding the firm of O. Kai & Co. in 1885, operating Japanese art and curio stores in San Francisco and New York. Her father, Eiichirō, studied at the Mark Hopkins Institute of Art and was sent to run the firm's San Francisco branch in 1901; he married Kai's mother, Ine, in Japan in 1905, and the couple had four children, among them Kai's elder brother Yoshio. In the early 1920s, following Orie Kai's death, the family closed the San Francisco store and returned to Japan.

Kai showed ability in both dance and piano from an early age, and at the age of nine she enrolled at Tōyō Eiwa Jogakuin, where she studied piano. Unsettled by life in Japan after the Great Kantō Earthquake of 1923 damaged large parts of Tokyo, she arranged to return to the United States at the age of eleven, travelling in the company of the wife of Kyutaro Abiko, publisher of the San Francisco Japanese-language daily Nichi Bei Shimbun. In San Francisco she was placed in the care of Toro Kawasaki, then a secretary at the Japanese consulate, and his American wife Edith, a piano teacher who had begun instructing Kai and her siblings before the family left for Japan.

Kai progressed rapidly, soon appearing in group recitals with other pupils and acquiring a reputation as a child prodigy, although she later maintained that she had been scarcely better as a performer than her Japanese contemporaries. Her debut came in September 1925 when the Bay Area station KLX broadcast her playing as part of a program featuring the local Japanese consul. In 1927, at the age of fourteen, she received the Beethoven Prize at the Piano Playing Tournament in San Francisco. She later wrote:

I returned to Japan at nine, but life didn't suit me, and at eleven I crossed to America alone — the first of many back-and-forth trips between Japan and the United States. In the end, I chose life in America.

— Miwa Kai (2008)

In the autumn of 1927, Kai returned to Japan with the Kawasakis as part of a concert tour, during which her birth parents reclaimed custody of her. Distressed by the dispute between the two couples, she ran away and was found in a park, and in the end reluctantly rejoined her parents and remained in Japan. Her departure from the Kawasaki household was so sudden that her clothes and personal belongings were left behind in San Francisco and had to be retrieved later; she never saw Edith Kawasaki again. Kai enrolled in secondary school and continued her training with the White Russian Jewish émigré pianist Maxim Schapiro (1885–1958), who also taught the Nisei pianist Aiko Tashiro. According to some accounts her family arranged for her to marry a Japanese nobleman, but the engagement was called off.

== Piano career ==
=== Recognition in Japan ===
In 1932, Kai entered the piano division of the first Music Competition of Japan (then simply the Music Competition; 第1回音楽コンクール), organized by the newspaper Jiji Shinpō, which carried a prize of one thousand yen. The first two competitions assigned no numerical rankings; instead a prize (賞) was given to the leading entrant in each division, with a single Grand Prize (大賞) awarded above them. Kai received the Grand Prize, while the piano division prize went to Nobuko Kanematsu. The Grand Prize was offered at the first through sixth competitions, and Kai remained its only recipient. Her success made her the subject of popular magazine coverage as a prodigy.

Kai gave the Japanese premiere of Robert Schumann's Piano Concerto in A minor, Op. 54 in 1933, appearing with the New Symphony Orchestra under Nikolai Shifferblatt. The performance was reviewed at length by the critic Seiichirō Utsumi in the inaugural issue of the journal Ongaku Hyōron. Two years later, in 1935, she again appeared with the New Symphony Orchestra under Shifferblatt, this time in Franz Liszt's Piano Concerto No. 1. That same year she was a soloist at Tokyo's Hibiya Public Hall under the conductor Hidemaro Konoye, brother of Prince Fumimaro Konoe.

=== Chopin Competition and European tour ===
In 1937, Kai traveled to Poland by the Trans-Siberian Railway to compete in the third International Chopin Piano Competition in Warsaw, performing with the Harbin Philharmonic in Japanese-controlled Manchuria while en route. She and Chieko Hara, then studying in France, were the first Japanese entrants to the competition and the first from any country in Asia. Eighty pianists from twenty-two countries took part, and although neither of them were among the prizewinners, their playing in kimono was warmly received by critics and the public. Kai was invited to perform for President Ignacy Mościcki at a reception held for the competitors and the diplomatic corps at the Royal Castle. On the journey, she stopped in Moscow, where she attended opera performances and concerts, later publishing an account of the impression Russian artistic life had made on her.

Following the competition, Kai was invited by the Japanese Embassy in Berlin on a tour of London, after which she stayed as a guest at the Japanese legations in Paris and Vienna. She returned to Japan as a well-known public figure and gave a recital of Chopin and other composers at Hibiya Public Hall under the auspices of the Polish minister to Japan and the Tokyo Nichi Nichi Shimbun. Further recitals in Tokyo and Osaka followed, with the Musical Courier commending her technical fluency and artistry and the Japan Advertiser predicting a distinguished career. She also made several radio appearances and toured Manchukuo, performing in Dairen, Mukden, and Hsinking. In February 1939 she appeared in a two-piano recital in Tokyo alongside Schapiro.

=== Return to the United States ===
In May 1939, Kai returned to the United States on a goodwill tour sponsored by the Japan Tourist Bureau, accompanying the entertainer Takiko Mizunoe. The following month she gave a recital at Gyosei Hall of works by Chopin, Liszt, Mendelssohn, and Rachmaninoff. She went back to Japan shortly afterwards, but in January 1940 traveled once more to California, this time for an announced stay of a year. She settled in San Francisco, opened a piano school, and continued to study and perform with Schapiro.

== Wartime incarceration ==
Kai was living in San Francisco at the time of the attack on Pearl Harbor in December 1941. In April 1942 she was confined by the United States government at the Santa Anita Assembly Center, and that October she was transferred to the Topaz War Relocation Center near Delta, Utah, one of the camps established for Japanese Americans and Japanese nationals during the war. At Topaz she taught piano in the camp music school alongside colleagues including the former prodigy Newton Tani, played in faculty concerts, and was visited twice by Schapiro.

In December 1943, Kai secured release from Topaz in order to work in Chicago for John Embree, an anthropologist of Japan then serving with the War Relocation Authority. Working in coordination with Embree, she translated the diary of Yaeko Yamaji, later published as The Diary of a Japanese Innkeeper's Daughter. She moved to New York in 1944.

== Library career ==
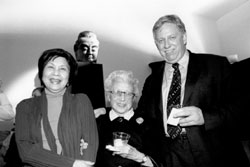
Kai at Columbia c. 1964

Kai was hired by the Columbia University Library in 1944 as a typist at sixty cents an hour. Because of her command of Japanese she was assigned to catalogue the library's Japanese-language materials, much of which had come from the collection of New York's Nippon Club after that institution was forced to close following the attack on Pearl Harbor. In 1945 she became head of the Japanese collection of the East Asian Library, later renamed the C.V. Starr East Asian Library after Cornelius Vander Starr, a post she held until 1983.

The Japanese-language holdings of the East Asian Library had been built largely around materials assembled through the efforts of Ryusaku Tsunoda. After the end of the war in 1945, Kai spent two months at the Library of Congress in Washington, D.C., with her colleague Philip Yampolsky, helping to process books that occupation authorities had confiscated from libraries throughout Japan. Several thousand duplicate volumes identified in the course of that work were acquired for the Columbia collection.

Kai also received and trained librarians sent to Columbia by Japanese institutions, among them the National Diet Library and the library of Waseda University. Her work on the Japanese collection was described by Columbia as having left a lasting mark not only on the university but on librarians and scholars of Japanese studies more broadly. After Tsunoda's death in 1964 she spent many years arranging the transfer of his personal library to Waseda University, where the roughly 1,500 volumes formed the Ryusaku Tsunoda Memorial Collection, opened on October 20, 2007, to mark the university's 125th anniversary.

Kai retired in 1983 on reaching seventy, then the mandatory retirement age. To mark her nearly four decades of service, a metal plaque was dedicated to her in the reading room of the C.V. Starr East Asian Library and a cherry tree was planted in her honor outside Kent Hall. She retained office space at the university, which she shared with Wm. Theodore de Bary, and continued to serve as researcher and bibliographic assistant to the University Committee on Asia and the Middle East. Her principal projects after retirement were two published catalogues, issued in 1986 and 1996; she then began a comprehensive history of the Japanese collection at the East Asian Library, which she worked on almost until the end of her life but did not complete.

In 1995 the Japanese government conferred on Kai the Order of the Precious Crown, Wisteria, for her contributions to the understanding of Japan, the development of Japanese studies, and cultural exchange between the United States and Japan; the decoration was presented by Emperor Akihito at the Imperial Palace. She died at her residence in Manhattan on December 10, 2011, at the age of 98.

== Legacy ==
A memorial service for Kai was held in the C.V. Starr East Asian Library reading room on April 20, 2012, with tributes from Columbia faculty, the librarians of the National Diet Library and Waseda University Library, and members of her family. The reading room holds a display of items associated with her, including the sign from the Japanese-language library at the Topaz War Relocation Center, the Order of the Precious Crown medal and hanging scroll she received in 1995, a Waseda University certificate of appreciation, and a collection of first-day cover cachets donated in her honor. The Topaz sign was carved on a native cedar limb by an internee and is accompanied by a copper plaque inscribed by Shichinosuke Asano in 1974.

Kai's papers, amounting to some 31 linear feet and incorporating material she inherited from Ryusaku Tsunoda and Howard P. Linton, are held at Columbia University. Following her death, her family established the Miwa Kai Fund to support the Japanese-language collection of the East Asian Library. A memorial issue of the Journal of East Asian Libraries (no. 154, 2012), the organ of the Council on East Asian Libraries, published tributes from colleagues and associates including Donald Keene and Noritada Otaki. Her career has also been treated alongside that of the pianist and jurist Fujita Haruko in a study of Japanese women who moved between music and librarianship.

== Publications ==
- Political Chronology of Japan, 1885–1957 (with Philip B. Yampolsky). New York: East Asian Institute, Columbia University (1957)
- Say It in Japanese. New York: Dover Publications (first published in the 1950s; revised and enlarged edition 1983)
- Yaeko Yamaji, The Diary of a Japanese Innkeeper's Daughter, trans. Miwa Kai, ed. Robert J. Smith and Kazuko Smith. Ithaca: Cornell University East Asia Papers, no. 36 (1984)
- The David Eugene Smith Collection of Works in Japanese on Japanese Mathematics. New York: Rare Book and Manuscript Library, Columbia University (1986)
- The David Eugene Smith Collection of Works in Chinese on Mathematics and Other Subjects. New York: Rare Book and Manuscript Library, Columbia University (1989)
- Japanese Woodblock Printed Books and Other Unique Japanese Materials at Columbia University (2 volumes in 4 parts). New York (1996)
