= Yasushi Nagao =

Japanese photographer (1930–2009)

- 長尾 靖
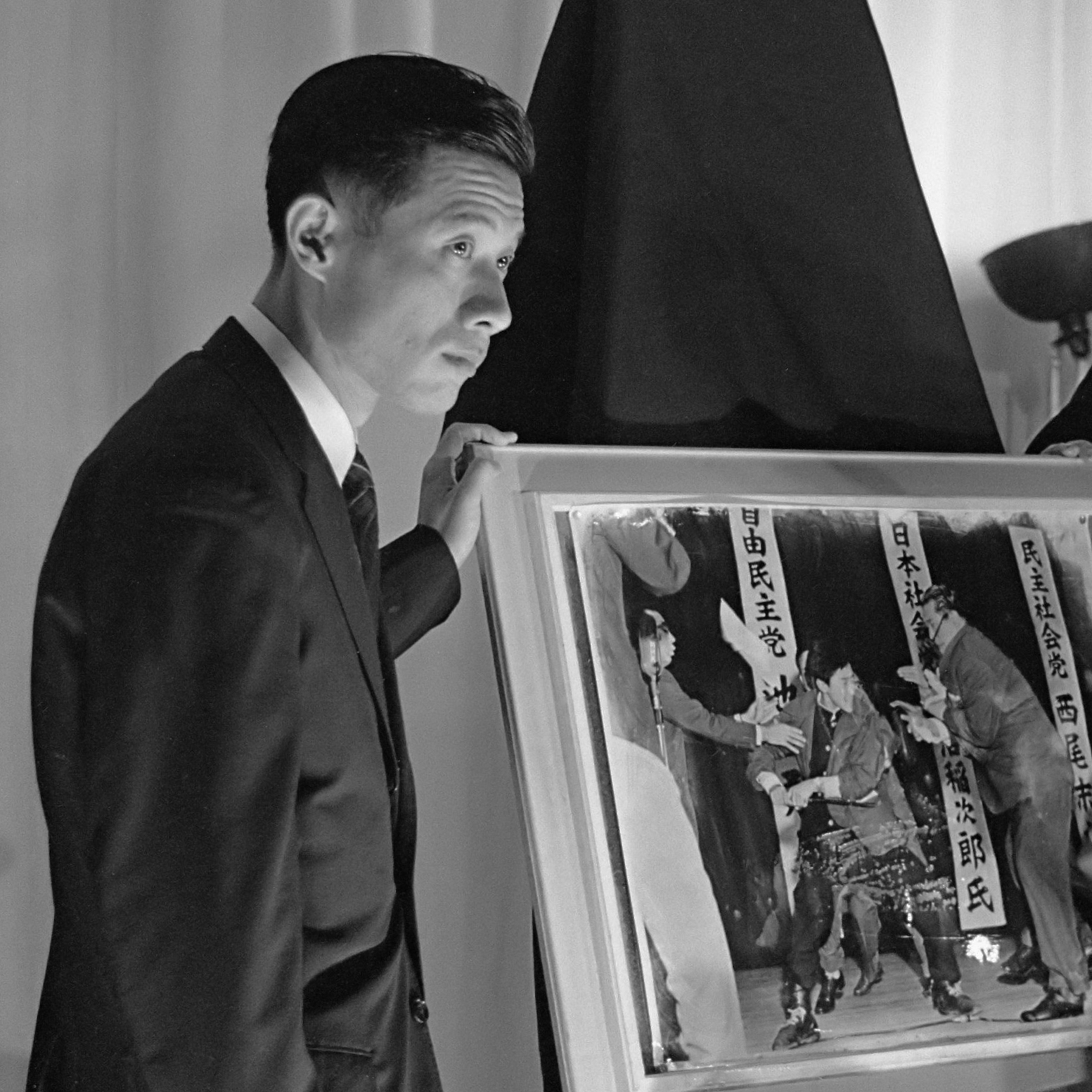
- Nagao in 1961
- Born: 20 May 1930
- Died: 2 May 2009 (aged 78); Shimogamo, Minamiizu, Japan
- Occupation: Photojournalist
- Known for: Photographing the Assassination of Inejirō Asanuma
- Awards: World Press Photo of the Year; Pulitzer Prize for Photography

Yasushi Nagao (長尾 靖, Nagao Yasushi; 20 May 1930 – 2 May 2009) was a Japanese photojournalist. He became the first Japanese to win the Pulitzer Prize for his 1960 photograph capturing the moment Inejirō Asanuma, chairman of the Japan Socialist Party, was stabbed to death.

== Career ==
Nagao is best known for his photograph of Otoya Yamaguchi assassinating Japanese Socialist Party politician Inejirō Asanuma. At the time Nagao was a cameraman working for Mainichi Shimbun. Hisatake Abo, Nagao's picture editor, told Nagao to cover a debate at Hibiya Hall. As Yamaguchi charged Asanuma, Nagao changed the focus to fifteen feet from ten feet.

"Tokyo Stabbing", Nagao's famous photograph

Nagao won the 1960 World Press Photo of the Year award and the 1961 Pulitzer Prize. The first award allowed Nagao to travel abroad widely, impossible for most Japanese people at the time.

Nagao left the newspaper in 1962 and became a freelance photographer.

== Death ==
Nagao was found dead in the bathroom of his apartment in the Shimogamo district of Minamiizu on 2 May 2009. It is believed he died of natural causes.
