= Assassination of Inejirō Asanuma =

1960 murder in Tokyo, Japan

- Part of the Anpo counter-protests and far-right assassinations in post-war Japan
- Yasushi Nagao's Pulitzer Prize-winning photograph of Yamaguchi attempting to stab Asanuma for a second time
- Location: Hibiya Public Hall, Chiyoda, Tokyo, Japan
- Date: October 12, 1960; 66 years ago 3:05 p.m. (UTC+09:00)
- Target: Inejirō Asanuma, Chairman of the Japan Socialist Party
- Attack type: Assassination by stabbing
- Weapon: Wakizashi
- Victim: Inejirō Asanuma
- Perpetrator: Otoya Yamaguchi
- Motive: Opposition and resentment towards Asanuma's words and actions during his visit to China and during the Anpo protests; deter the spread of left-wing movements in Japan

On 12 October 1960, Inejirō Asanuma (浅沼 稲次郎, Asanuma Inejirō), chairman of the Japan Socialist Party, was assassinated at Hibiya Public Hall in Tokyo. During a televised debate, 17-year-old Otoya Yamaguchi, an extreme anti-communist activist, charged onto the stage and fatally stabbed Asanuma with a wakizashi, a type of traditional short sword.

The assassination weakened the Japan Socialist Party, inspired a series of copycat crimes, and made Yamaguchi an enduring hero and subsequently a martyr to various Japanese far-right groups, including the Greater Japan Patriotic Party of which Yamaguchi had been a member.

== Background ==
Inejirō Asanuma was a prominent Japanese politician and chairman of the Japan Socialist Party (日本社会党, Nihon Shakai-tō; JSP). Known for his energetic campaigning style and working-class appeal, he was affectionately called "Numa-san" and the "Human Locomotive" by supporters. In 1959, Asanuma caused controversy in Japan by visiting the People's Republic of China and delivering a speech in Beijing in which he declared American imperialism a "common enemy" of China and Japan. He stated that Taiwan was part of China and Okinawa part of Japan, attributing their separation from their respective mainlands to American imperialism, and called for the removal of foreign military bases and nuclear disarmament in Asia. He also advocated Japanese independence from the United States and proposed an Asian peace and security system involving Japan, China, the Soviet Union, and the United States. In the conclusion of his speech, Asanuma linked these goals to socialism, arguing that humanity's true nature lay not in conflict between people, classes, or nations, but in resolving such conflicts and collectively struggling against "great Nature." He presented contemporary China as an example of this ideal in practice. In spite of the strong backlash from conservatives and right-wing groups, Asanuma refused suggestions from those around him to accept a bodyguard. He replied, "I am a socialist. It is not necessary," and expressed firm confidence that "the masses believe in me" and "no one would try to kill me."

Asanuma was a democratic socialist who led the right-leaning faction of the Japan Socialist Party and was ideologically distinct from the Japanese Communist Party. In a speech criticizing the conservative government's policies, Asanuma warned:

The Yoshida Cabinet has completely failed to respond to the passionate feelings of the people. Instead, it blindly follows America in foreign policy, while in domestic policy it races full speed ahead on a reactionary and reverse course. This has given rise to fascist reactionary politics that drive progressive citizens to despair. At the same time, it has created openings for the Communist Party to run rampant, opened the path to both left-wing and right-wing totalitarianism, and placed our homeland and democracy in grave crisis.

Despite his left-wing politics, Asanuma was known for his personal reverence for the Emperor. He maintained a kamidana in his modest apartment and performed daily rituals there. At the founding convention of the Japan Socialist Party on 2 November 1945, Asanuma called on attendees to stand and perform remote worship toward the Imperial Palace; more than half reportedly joined him, while some participants protested. Asanuma also advocated maintaining the kokutai and, together with Toyohiko Kagawa and others, participated in a threefold cry of "Tenno Heika Banzai!" On one occasion, he became furious and loudly reprimanded a journalist who made mocking remarks about the Emperor during an informal conversation.

After returning to Japan, Asanuma, in his role as leader of the JSP, became one of the key leaders and main public faces of the massive Anpo protests, a series of protests against the 1960 revision of the U.S.-Japan Security Treaty (known as "Anpo" in Japanese).

Asanuma and the JSP led a number of mass marches on the Japanese National Diet. Most notable, as referenced in Yamaguchi's writings, was the June 15th incident, where on 15 June 1960, anti-treaty protestors stormed the National Diet compound. This led to a brawl with police and counter-protestors, resulting in severe injuries.

Right-wing groups and individuals, such as Bin Akao and his Greater Japan Patriotic Party (大日本愛国党, Dai Nippon Aikoku Tō), were doubly upset with Asanuma for portraying the U.S. as Japan's main enemy on his trip to China and for actively opposing the Security Treaty. The massive left-wing protests convinced Akao, his party, and many other right-wing groups that Japan was on the verge of a communist revolution. The aforementioned began staging and participating in protests, counter-protests, and other political activities. Akao gave numerous public speeches, notably mentioning the important role of the youth in resisting their political rivals. One of these speeches attracted the attention of 17-year-old Otoya Yamaguchi, who would resultingly join the party, participate in their activities, and later assassinate Asanuma.

== Perpetrator ==
Yamaguchi in May 1960

Yamaguchi was born on 22 February 1943 in Yanaka, Taitō ward, Tokyo, the son of a high-ranking officer in the Imperial Japanese Army. Beginning in early childhood, Yamaguchi began reading newspapers. Angered by what he read, he became vehemently critical of politicians and later interested in nationalist movements. Through his older brother's influence, he began attending speeches and participating in right-wing protests and counter-protests. At age 16, he formally joined Bin Akao's ultranationalist Greater Japan Patriotic Party.

Yamaguchi participated in the Anpo counter-protests, and was arrested and released 10 times over the course of 1959 and 1960.

=== Ideological influences ===
Although Otoya Yamaguchi was influenced by right-wing ultranationalist groups, he was also shaped by the doctrine of the religious movement Seichō no Ie, particularly through founder Masaharu Taniguchi's writings such as Tennō Zettai-ron to Sono Eikyō (Absolute Theory of the Emperor and Its Influence), which Yamaguchi credited in his interrogation records with helping him overcome personal hesitation and embrace selfless loyalty to commit the act, Asanuma himself supported the founder of this movement, Masaharu Taniguchi. Taniguchi affirmed that Seichō no Ie was neither opposed to the Socialist Party nor aligned with the Liberal Democratic Party.

A further motivational factor may have been Akao's personal view of Asanuma. Akao, who had known Asanuma since their time on Miyake-jima, once described him as "a good person, which makes it regrettable to deal with him" (善人だから始末に悪い). According to Sawaki Kōtarō's Teroru no Kessan, the two men were acquaintances who would exchange greetings when they passed each other on the street. Some sources suggest that this personal assessment, alongside Asanuma's statement labeling American imperialism as the common enemy of Japan and China (as recorded in Yamaguchi's Memorial of Severing the Traitor), influenced Yamaguchi's motives.

Over the course of the Anpo protests, Yamaguchi became disillusioned with Akao's leadership, and later resigned from the party. In his testimony given to police, he stated that he had resigned from Akao's party in order to "lay [his] hands on a weapon" and be free to take more "decisive action."

== Assassination ==
On 12 October 1960, Asanuma was participating in a televised election debate at Hibiya Public Hall in central Tokyo, featuring the leaders of the three major political parties. Also scheduled to participate were Suehiro Nishio of the Democratic Socialist Party and prime minister Hayato Ikeda of the ruling Liberal Democratic Party. The debate was sponsored by the Japanese Elections Commission, the Alliance for Clean Elections and national broadcaster NHK, which was also televising the event. There was also an audience of 2,500 people in the hall.

Nishio spoke first, and at 3:00 p.m., Asanuma advanced to the podium and began his speech. Immediately, right-wing groups in the audience began loudly heckling him, and the television microphones and reporters sitting in the front row could not hear him, forcing the NHK moderator to interrupt and call for calm. At 3:05 p.m., the audience finally calmed down. As Asanuma said "During elections, they keep policies that would be unpopular with the public a secret, and then once they have won a majority in the election, they will..." ("選挙の際は、国民に評判の悪い政策は、全部伏せておいて、選挙で多数を占むると..."), Yamaguchi rushed onto the stage and made a deep thrust into Asanuma's left flank with a 33-centimetre (13 in) samurai short sword (wakizashi) (Note: The sword was an undersized replica of a sword forged in the Kamakura period by the swordsmith Rai Kunitoshi, and thus is better considered a wakizashi (almost a tantō) than a full-sized tachi or katana.) that he had stolen from his father. Yamaguchi then attempted to stab Asanuma a second time before being swarmed and detained by bystanders.

Bin Akao, who was present, reportedly remarked to someone nearby upon noticing the limited bleeding, "Little boy, did you miss your chance?" (坊や、やりそこなったかな). Newsreel footage from "Mainichi News" captured him praising the act with "The little boy did well, he's great" (坊やがよくやったもんだ、偉いもんだ) and welcoming a girl who had traveled to Tokyo intending to assassinate the Japan Teachers' Union chairman.

Autopsy later confirmed that Yamaguchi's thrust had punctured Asanuma's aorta, causing rapid and massive internal hemorrhage with virtually no external bleeding, which is why initial observers believed the wound was not immediately fatal. Asanuma was immediately rushed out of the hall and to a nearby hospital, but died minutes before arriving.

=== Content of Asanuma's last speech ===
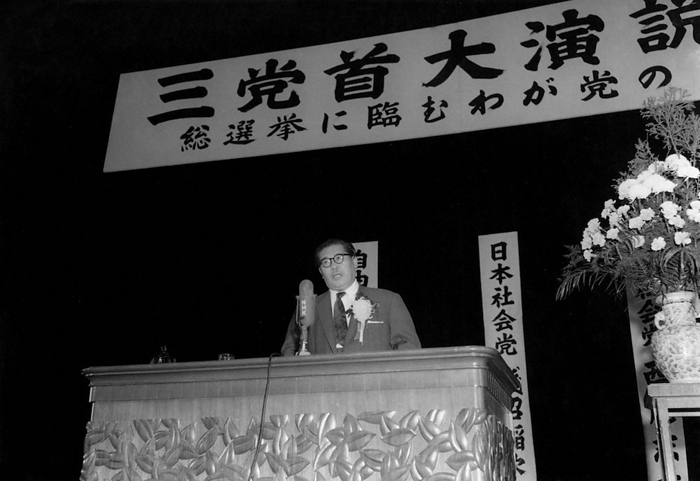
Asanuma delivering his last speech before being assassinated

Asanuma's address (titled in effect "Our party's attitude toward the coming general election") had already covered several major themes before the interruption: criticism of the Ikeda cabinet's Income Doubling Plan (inflation outpacing wage gains, unemployment risks from trade liberalization, "cutting off" small farmers, inadequate social security and tax relief, special tax breaks for large corporations, and flaws in the forthcoming National Pension Law); opposition to the revised U.S.–Japan Security Treaty (foreign bases as extraterritorial enclaves, loss of sovereignty, heightened war danger—quoting Indian Prime Minister Jawaharlal Nehru that "the existence of foreign bases within a country means that foreign powers have entered into its very heart, and they always carry the scent of war"— and the need for active neutrality plus a four-power security framework involving Japan, the United States, the Soviet Union and China); the urgency of normalizing relations with the People's Republic of China; and a defense of parliamentary democracy against the practice of concealing unpopular policies during elections and then forcing them through by numerical majority afterward. In the course of the speech he also referred positively to moderate figures within the Liberal Democratic Party, noting that even within the LDP there were people such as former Prime Minister Tanzan Ishibashi and Kenzo Matsumura who possessed common sense and a good outlook.

The precise last words spoken, after the moderator restored order, were: "During elections, they keep policies that would be unpopular with the public a secret, and then once they have won a majority in the election, they will..." (選挙のさいは国民に評判の悪いものは全部捨てておいて、選挙で多数を占むると...)

According to the published draft, he intended to continue: "push through anything using the power of the majority. What is the point of elections or a Diet if this is allowed? This is the majority party digging its own grave for parliamentary democracy." (どんな無茶なことでも国会の多数にものをいわせて押し通すというのでは、いったい何のために選挙をやり、何のために国会があるのか、わかりません。これでは多数派の政党がみずから議会政治の墓穴を掘ることになります。)

The undelivered conclusion went on to condemn the May 1960 forced passage of the Security Treaty, call for major issues affecting peace and democracy to be put to the electorate, denounce "money politics," and pledge that a Socialist-centered "constitution-protecting, democratic, neutral" government would restore clean parliamentary practice, prioritize China relations and constitutional defense, and guarantee hope for youth, jobs, and security for the elderly.

== Aftermath ==
=== Family reaction ===
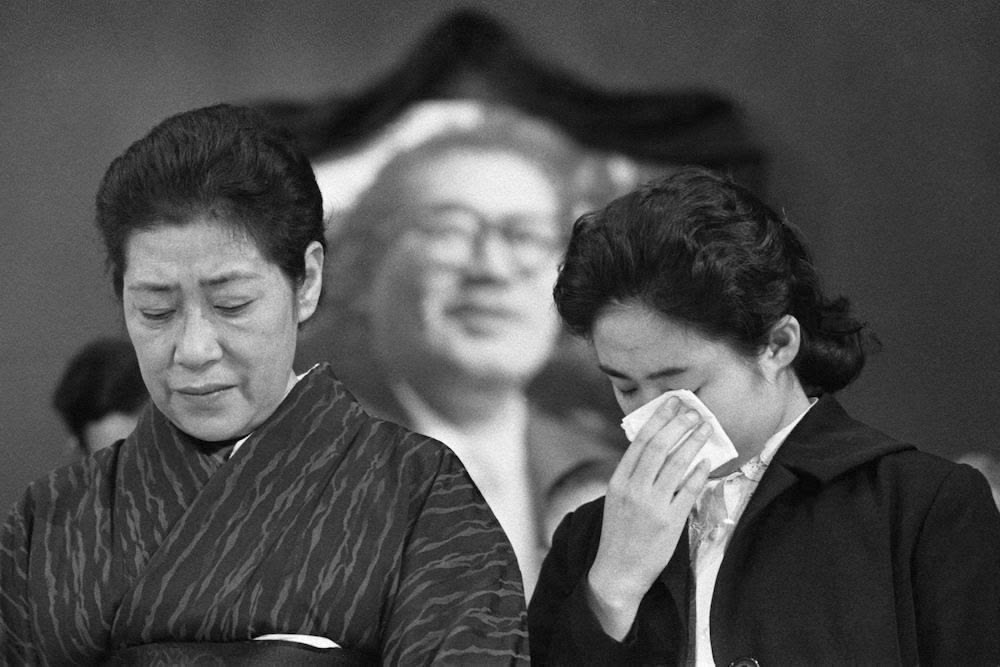
Kyoko, widow of Asanuma (left) observes a moment of silence and her eldest daughter Kinue sheds tears, 13 October 1960

Kyōko Asanuma, at home, was watching the tape-delayed broadcast of the debate which had been preempted by coverage of the Japan Series baseball championships when she saw a breaking news scroll announcing that her husband had been stabbed. She jumped up, called to her daughter, prepared a change of clothes for him, and rushed by taxi first to Hibiya Public Hall and then to the hospital, where she learned he had died. In the days that followed, occupied with funeral arrangements and social obligations, she had no opportunity to listen to an audio recording of his final speech that was sent by the television network. On 17 October, while preparing to attend an Assembly Meeting against Terrorism, she saw the footage of the assassination for the first time during the noon news broadcast. She later described feeling an intense shock, as though she were witnessing the stabbing "intimately and intensely" for the first time.

The family received a large amount of correspondence following the assassination, reflecting a wide range of reactions to Asanuma's death. The National Diet Library's catalogue records condolences and memorial messages from socialist and labor organizations, Japan Communist Party cells, journalists, students, schoolchildren, Korean organizations, religious figures, and ordinary citizens, as well as protest statements and signatures condemning the assassination and political violence. The correspondents came from strikingly different backgrounds; among them was a Self-Defense Forces member who identified himself as an aircraft mechanic from Ōita and sent condolences for Asanuma on 14 October 1960. Some correspondents sent photographs, poems, and other memorial material; one later correspondent sent sheet music titled "ASANUMAに捧ぐ" (Dedicated to Asanuma). On 15 October 1960, three days after Asanuma's death, the catalogue also records a letter to Kyōko and Kinue Asanuma from the Uchimura Kanzo School League for National Independence, World Salvation, Shinto, and Virtue (内村鑑三派民族独立救世神道聖徳連盟, Uchimura Kanzō-ha Minzoku Dokuritsu Kyūsei Shintō Seitoku Renmei), whose contents are described as a "criticism of the Jewish people." The catalogue does not provide the full text of this letter, so its precise argument and whether it connected Jews to Asanuma's assassination are unknown. A Buddhist religious figure, Iwasaki Nichiryō (岩崎日亮), the senior Buddhist priest of Myōhō-ji, sent Kyōko a handwritten condolence on 23 October 1960 accompanied by a calligraphic inscription of "Namu Myōhō Renge Kyō" (南無妙法蓮華経). The correspondence was not uniformly laudatory: at least one correspondent wrote to Kyōko criticizing aspects of Asanuma's conduct during his lifetime, while others condemned the assassination as an act of political terrorism.

Asanuma had been a great dog lover, and Jirō, an Akita, was his especially cherished companion. The dog had been given to him as a puppy by political rivals Kenji Fukunaga (LDP) and Ikkō Kasuga (DSP) to comfort him after a previous dog died. Because the couple had no biological children, Jirō became a precious family member in their modest Dōjunkai apartment.

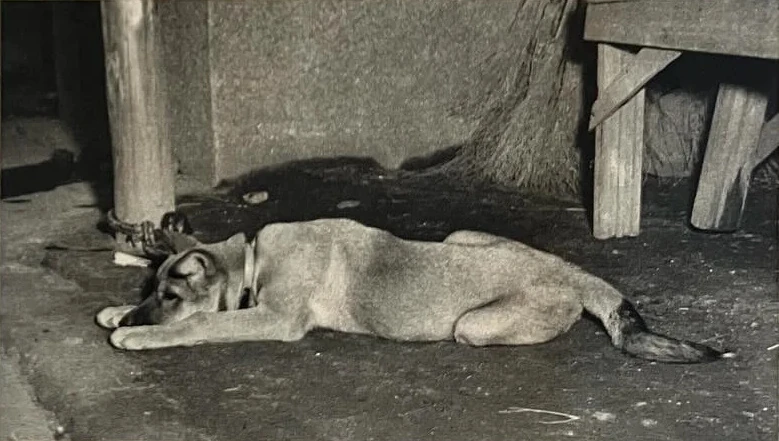
Jirō, Asanuma's Akita, stopped eating after the assassination and died shortly afterwards, reportedly of grief

After the assassination, Jirō sensed his master's permanent absence. He stopped eating and died shortly afterward, reportedly of grief "as if following his master." Contemporary coverage in the Asahi Graph (30 October 1960, issue No. 1896) included a photograph of the grieving Akita lying dejectedly outside the apartment, alongside images of Asanuma relaxing at home and his death mask.

This detail was also highlighted in Prime Minister Hayato Ikeda's eulogy, where he noted Asanuma's daily pleasure of walking his beloved dog in the neighborhood as emblematic of his approachable, everyman lifestyle.

=== Imperial reaction ===
On 17 October 1960, an imperial envoy personally visited Asanuma's family home in Shirakawa Town, Kōtō Ward, to deliver a sacrificial offering (saishiryō) from Emperor Hirohito himself, a rare and symbolic gesture of imperial condolence for a socialist politician.

One day later, on 18 October 1960, Emperor Hirohito addressed a special session of the Diet, condemning the assassination and appealing for public order and national unity in the face of the shock and potential unrest caused by the killing.

=== Ikeda's memorial speech ===
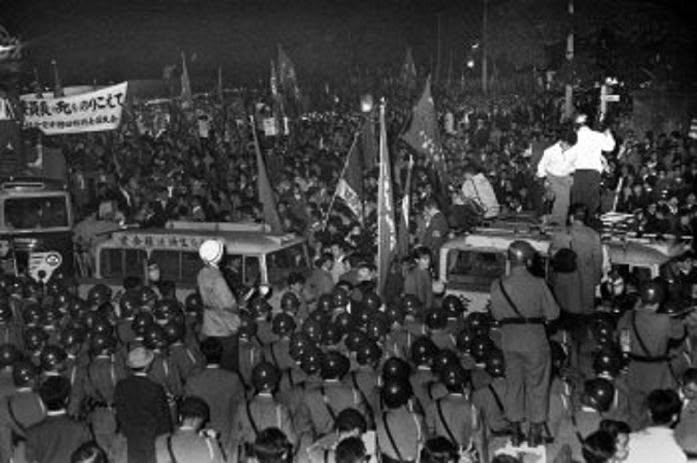
On 13 October 1960, more than 25,000 people took to the streets to demonstrate after the assassination of Asanuma

The Ikeda administration had been riding high going into the election debate. Ikeda's newly announced Income Doubling Plan had proven popular, and polls showed his party in a strong position heading toward the election. However, on the night of Asanuma's assassination, approximately 20,000 protesters spontaneously flooded the streets of Tokyo calling for the entire Ikeda cabinet to resign in order to take responsibility for failing to ensure Asanuma's safety. Ikeda and his advisors worried that a new protest movement might arise that would be the second coming of the Anpo protests that had toppled the cabinet of his immediate predecessor, Nobusuke Kishi.

To respond to the crisis, Ikeda took the unusual step of delivering a memorial speech at a plenary session of the Diet on 18 October. The Socialist Party Diet members vocally opposed the speech. Despite Ikeda's reputation as a poor public speaker and the expectation that he would give a short boilerplate speech, Ikeda surprised the crowd by delivering a lengthy oration in which he offered an eloquent and generous assessment of Asanuma's love for his country and the Japanese people as well as his hard work ethic. The speech was reported to have moved many Diet members to tears.

Ikeda's party went on to win the election, increasing its number of seats in the Diet, although Asanuma's Japan Socialist Party also fared well.

=== Yamaguchi's imprisonment and suicide ===
Following the assassination, Yamaguchi was arrested and imprisoned awaiting trial. Throughout his imprisonment, he remained calm and composed and freely gave extensive testimony to police. Yamaguchi consistently asserted that he had acted alone and without any direction from others. Finally, on 2 November, he wrote "Long live the Emperor" (天皇陛下万歳, tennōheika banzai) and "Would that I had seven lives to give for my country" (七生報国, shichishō hōkoku) on the wall of his cell using toothpaste, the latter a reference to the last words of 14th-century samurai Kusunoki Masasue, and hanged himself with knotted bed sheets. He was found hanging at 8:31 p.m. and was apparently still alive at the time, but was pronounced dead three hours later after unsuccessful attempts to revive him by artificial respiration.

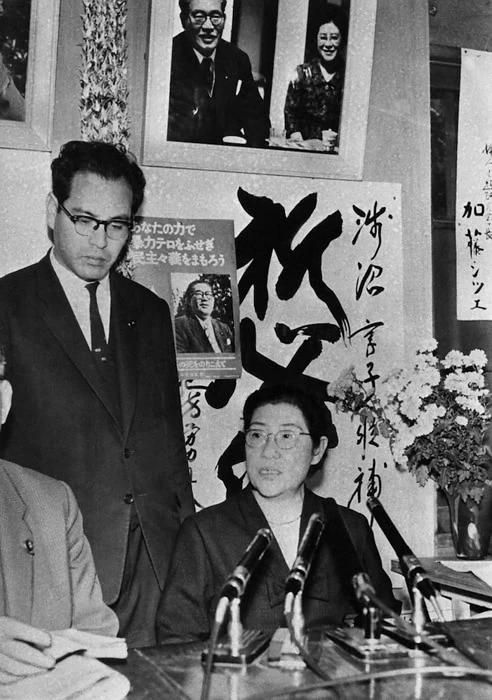
Kyōko at a press conference following news of Otoya Yamaguchi's suicide, 3 November 1960

On 3 November, the day after Yamaguchi's suicide, Kyōko Asanuma, widow of Inejirō Asanuma, held a press conference to address the news. She stated that she had learned of Yamaguchi's death from the morning newspapers and expressed pity for the young man rather than hatred, while directing strong condemnation toward the influences that had radicalized him:

I first learned of Yamaguchi's suicide this morning through the newspaper. Rather than feeling hatred toward the boy, I feel more pity for him. My anger is burning up from the bottom of my heart once again toward the unseen forces that instilled such dangerous ideas into a 17-year-old boy and drove him to commit assassination.

Her response was widely regarded as an embodiment of the principle of "hating the sin but not the sinner".

Yamaguchi's mother continued to visit Asanuma's grave on the anniversary of the latter's death.

=== Broader targets and views on the imperial family ===
In his November 1960 police confession, Yamaguchi compiled a list of primary targets for assassination to curb what he saw as Japan's slide toward communism, including figures like Iwao Kobayashi (Nikkyoso chairman), Sanzo Nosaka (Japanese Communist Party leader), Inejirō Asanuma (his victim), Ichiro Kono, Tanzan Ishibashi, and Koichiro Matsumoto. He extended criticism to Prince Mikasa, brother of Emperor Hirohito, including him on a broader target list. Yamaguchi accused the prince of opposing Kigen-setsu (National Foundation Day), making statements that denied the imperial family's role, and allowing himself to be "used by the left wing." He expressed a desire to seek the prince's "reflection by some means", interpreted in context as implying potential confrontation or violence, due to Mikasa's liberal and pacifist views, including criticisms of Japan's actions in the Greater East Asia War. No evidence indicates Yamaguchi acted on plans beyond Asanuma before his arrest and suicide.

== Legacies ==
=== Decline of the Japan Socialist Party ===
The Japan Socialist Party had been an unhappy marriage between far-left socialists, centrist socialists and right socialists who had been forced together in order to oppose the consolidation of conservative parties into the Liberal Democratic Party in 1955. Asanuma was a charismatic figure who had been able to hold many of these mutually antagonistic factions together through the force of his personality. Under Asanuma's leadership, the party had won an increasing number of seats in the Diet in every election over the latter half of the 1950s and seemed to be gathering momentum. Asanuma's death deprived the party of his adroit leadership, and thrust Saburō Eda into the leadership role instead. Eda rapidly took the party in a more centrist direction, far faster than the left socialists were ready to accept. This led to growing infighting within the party and drastically damaged its ability to present a cohesive message to the public. Over the rest of the 1960s and going forward, the number of seats the socialists held in the Diet continued to decline until the party's extinction in 1996.

=== Cultural impact and public memory ===
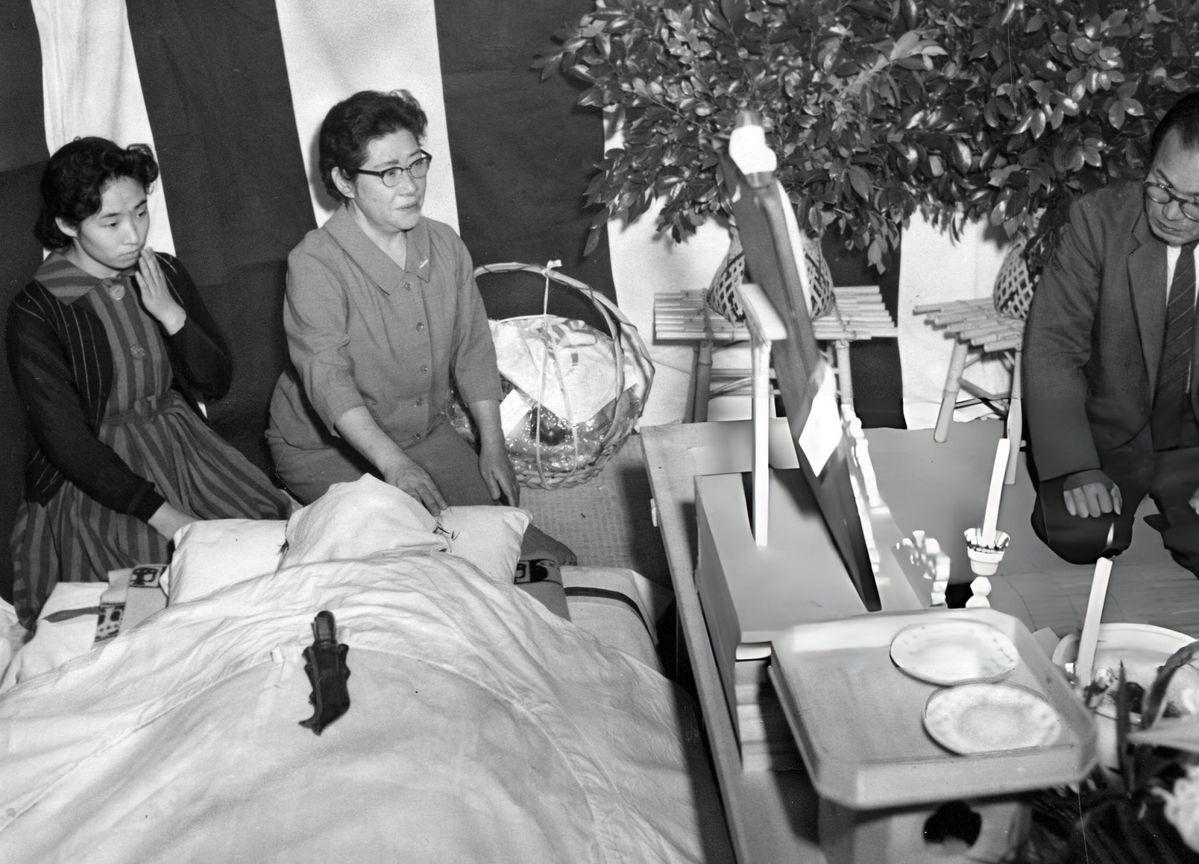
Kyōko and her daughter Kinue at Asanuma's wake following his assassination, 12 October 1960. On his chest rests a mamori-gatana, a ceremonial knife traditionally placed on the deceased as a talisman to ward off evil spirits and protect the soul on its journey to the afterlife.

News spread quickly outside the hall. According to former Mainichi Shimbun reporter Michio Ozaki, then a Waseda University student, a large banner reading "Inejirō Asanuma Has Been Assassinated!" appeared that evening near the university's literature department, leaving him stunned upon seeing it while leaving a café with friends.

Students, including Ozaki, visited Asanuma's modest rented apartment in Kōtō Ward to pay respects. A worker-like man greeted them with "Students, thanks for your trouble" and guided them inside, where Asanuma's wife and son-in-law Norikuni Nakano (then at Fuji TV) bowed deeply to the visiting mourners in front of the body."

Because Asanuma's assassination took place in front of television cameras, it was repeatedly shown on television for weeks and was seen by almost everyone in Japan with access to a television. Within a few weeks of the assassination, Nobel Prize-winning author Kenzaburō Ōe wrote two novellas, Seventeen and The Death of a Political Youth, that were obviously inspired by Yamaguchi's actions, although he was not mentioned by name.

The most notable copycat crime was the Shimanaka incident of 1 February 1961. In this incident, Kazutaka Komori, a 17-year-old member of the Greater Japan Patriotic Party, attempted to assassinate the president of Chūō Kōron magazine for publishing a graphic dream sequence depicting the beheading of the emperor and his family. This played a role in establishing what came to be known as the Chrysanthemum taboo.

One notable reaction came from Kakuei Tanaka, then a senior Liberal Democratic Party politician who would later serve as Prime Minister of Japan. According to a later recollection by his son Kyō, Tanaka was at his family's home in Kagurazaka when he learned of Asanuma's assassination and immediately prepared to leave. When his son, then a third-grade elementary school student, remarked that Asanuma was a Socialist and therefore his father's political opponent, Tanaka reportedly replied: 「馬鹿野郎！たとえ社会党でも、国を良くしようと考える同士だ！俺が行かなくて、どうする！」 ("You idiot! Even if he was a Socialist, he was someone who wanted to make the country better! How could I not go?"). The anecdote was reported from an interview with Kyō published in Bessatsu Takarajima. A separate account states that Tanaka attended Asanuma's funeral.

One unusual aspect of Asanuma's posthumous image was the retrospective account given by prominent right-wing ultranationalist and political fixer Yoshio Kodama. Kodama was a major postwar "kuromaku" (behind-the-scenes power broker) active in both politics and the underworld from the 1930s to the 1970s; he organized right-wing groups, maintained ties to organized crime, and wielded significant influence as a fixer for conservative politicians. In a dialogue with writer Shūsaku Endō published in his 1975 book Ware Kaku Tatakaeri (われかく戦えり), Kodama stated that he opposed the assassination: "I am opposed to it. Asanuma and I were on good terms. We often drank together. Asanuma personally was a fine person. That's why I said, 'Why did they do such a foolish thing? With this, they have eliminated the forum for dialogue between the Liberal Democratic Party and the Socialist Party.''" He further noted that he had publicly criticized similar violence (such as the subsequent Shimanaka incident) as not representing true nationalistic activism. According to the same account, Kodama is said to have provided money and information to Asanuma, both men were listed as patrons of professional wrestler Rikidōzan, and Asanuma allegedly used materials supplied by Kodama during the 1958 First FX fighter-aircraft selection controversy to criticize links between Grumman and Nobusuke Kishi.

=== Yasushi Nagao photograph ===
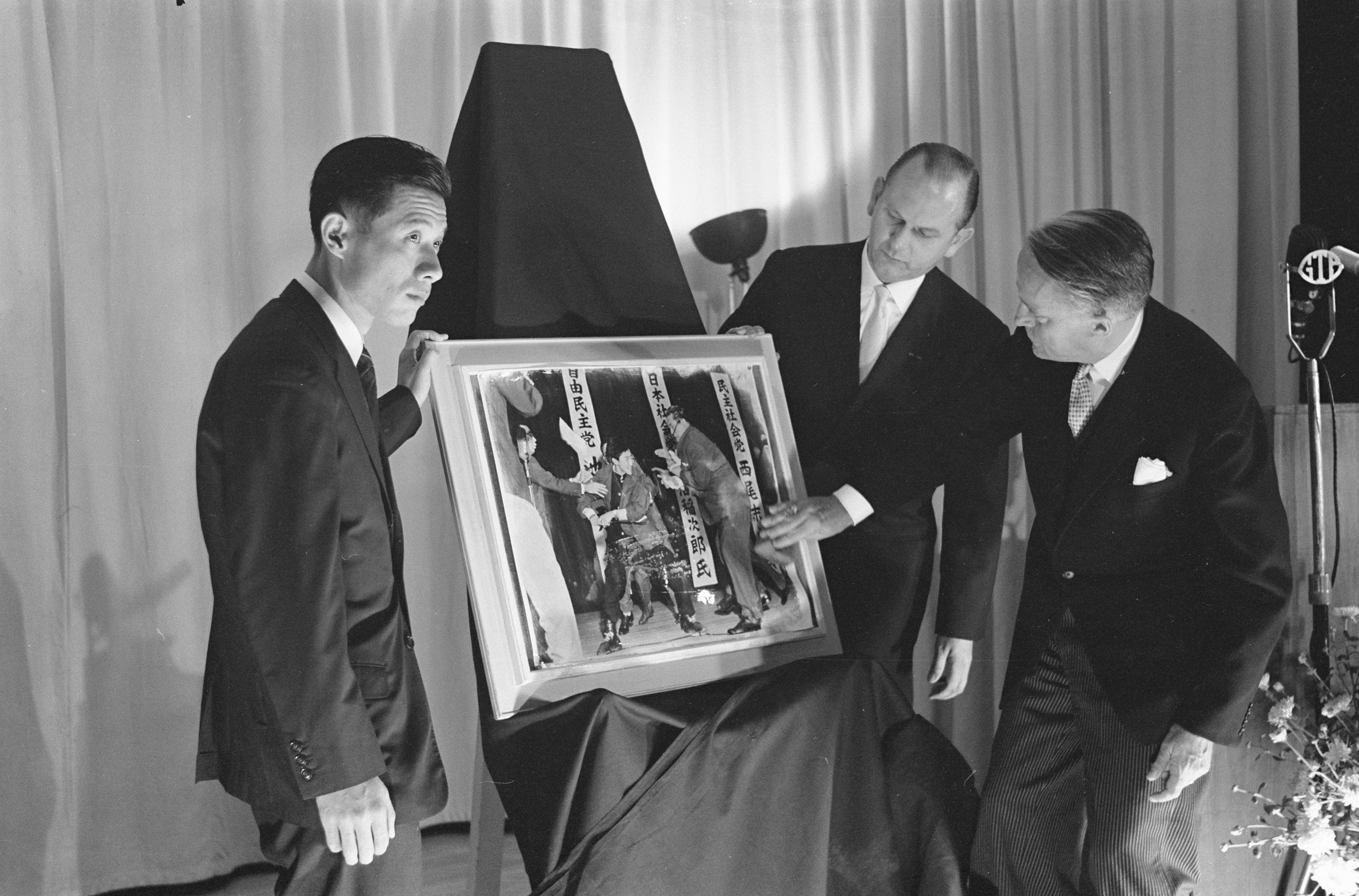
Yasushi Nagao (left) with the Pulitzer Prize-winning photograph (1961)

A photograph of the moment immediately after Yamaguchi stabbed Asanuma was taken by Mainichi Shinbun newspaper photographer Yasushi Nagao, who had been assigned to cover the debate. As Yamaguchi rushed Asanuma, Nagao instinctively adjusted the focal distance of his lens from 4,5 m (15 ft.) to 3 meters (10 ft.) and captured an extremely clear image of the assassination. Nagao's photograph won the World Press Photo of the Year award for 1960, and the 1961 Pulitzer Prize.

Tokyo Shimbun photographer Yoshitake Takayoshi also captured the assassination from a nearly identical angle. Positioned at the front of the stage slightly to the left, he initially used a 35 mm camera with a 105 mm telephoto lens to photograph Asanuma's speech. Sensing the disturbance, he switched to a pre-focused Speed Graphic camera equipped with a flash bulb (set at approximately 5 meters). He later described the chaotic scene as unfolding "like a slow-motion movie," with Asanuma's face slowly turning toward him as he pressed the shutter. His photograph appeared in the Tokyo Shimbun evening extra edition the same day, providing one of the earliest visual records.

Decades later, Yoshitake reflected on the emotional weight of the image: "I regard this photograph as a 'lucky scoop,' but it was also a heavy one. It was a scoop obtained through the death of Asanuma. My feeling of regret toward Asanuma has not changed even now, 50 years later." His image was slightly blurred due to the slower flash duration of the older bulb (approximately 1/100 second) compared to the faster electronic strobe lighting used by Nagao.

=== Martyr status ===
Yamaguchi became a hero and martyr to several Japanese far-right groups. On 15 December 1960, a large number of Japanese far-right groups gathered in the Hibiya Public Hall where the assassination had taken place to hold a "National Memorial Service for Our Martyred Brother Yamaguchi Otoya." The Greater Japan Patriotic Party has continued to hold an annual memorial service for Yamaguchi every year on 2 November, the anniversary of his suicide. An especially large event was held on 2 November 2010, the 50th anniversary of his suicide.

=== Outside Japan ===
On 12 October 2018, Gavin McInnes of the Proud Boys, along with members of the group, participated in a reenactment of the 1960 assassination at the Metropolitan Republican Club.

=== Asanuma Memorial Day ===
12 October, the anniversary of the assassination, is officially observed as Asanuma Memorial Day (浅沼稲次郎追悼の日) by the Japan Socialist Party and its successor groups, including the Social Democratic Party.

The day serves to honor Inejirō Asanuma's lifelong dedication to the labor movement, democratic socialism, and his efforts to represent ordinary working people. Annual memorial gatherings are held in Tokyo, typically featuring speeches by politicians (often from multiple parties), symposia on democracy and political violence, and exhibitions of historical materials. Since 2007, the Asanuma Inejirō Memorial Gathering Executive Committee (浅沼稲次郎追悼集会実行委員会) has organized larger-scale events around this date.

A bronze statue of Asanuma stands in his birthplace on Miyake-jima. Some of his personal items, including the blood-stained clothing he wore on the day of his death, are preserved and occasionally displayed at the National Diet Library's Constitutional Memorial Hall.

== See also ==
- List of assassinations in Asia
