= Motonari Iguchi =

Japanese pianist and educator

- Born: March 17, 1908; Japan Tokyo
- Died: September 29, 1983
- Other name: 井口 基成
- Occupation: pianist
- Spouse: Aiko Iguchi

Motonari Iguchi 井口 基成 (Iguchi Motonari) (17 May 1908, in Tokyo – 29 September 1983, in Tokyo) was a Japanese pianist and educator.

== Biography ==
He was influential in the post-war Japanese classical music world and his editions, published by Shunjūsha, are still the standard ones in that country. At the Tokyo Academy of Music Iguchi was a student of Leonid Kreuzer, a German piano instructor known for his powerful playing style, which Iguchi adopted. Later, Motonari Iguchi and his wife, Aiko, went on to become professors at the Tokyo Academy of Music.
