= Hibiya Public Hall =

Multi-purpose hall in Tokyo, Japan

Hibiya Public Hall 日比谷公会堂
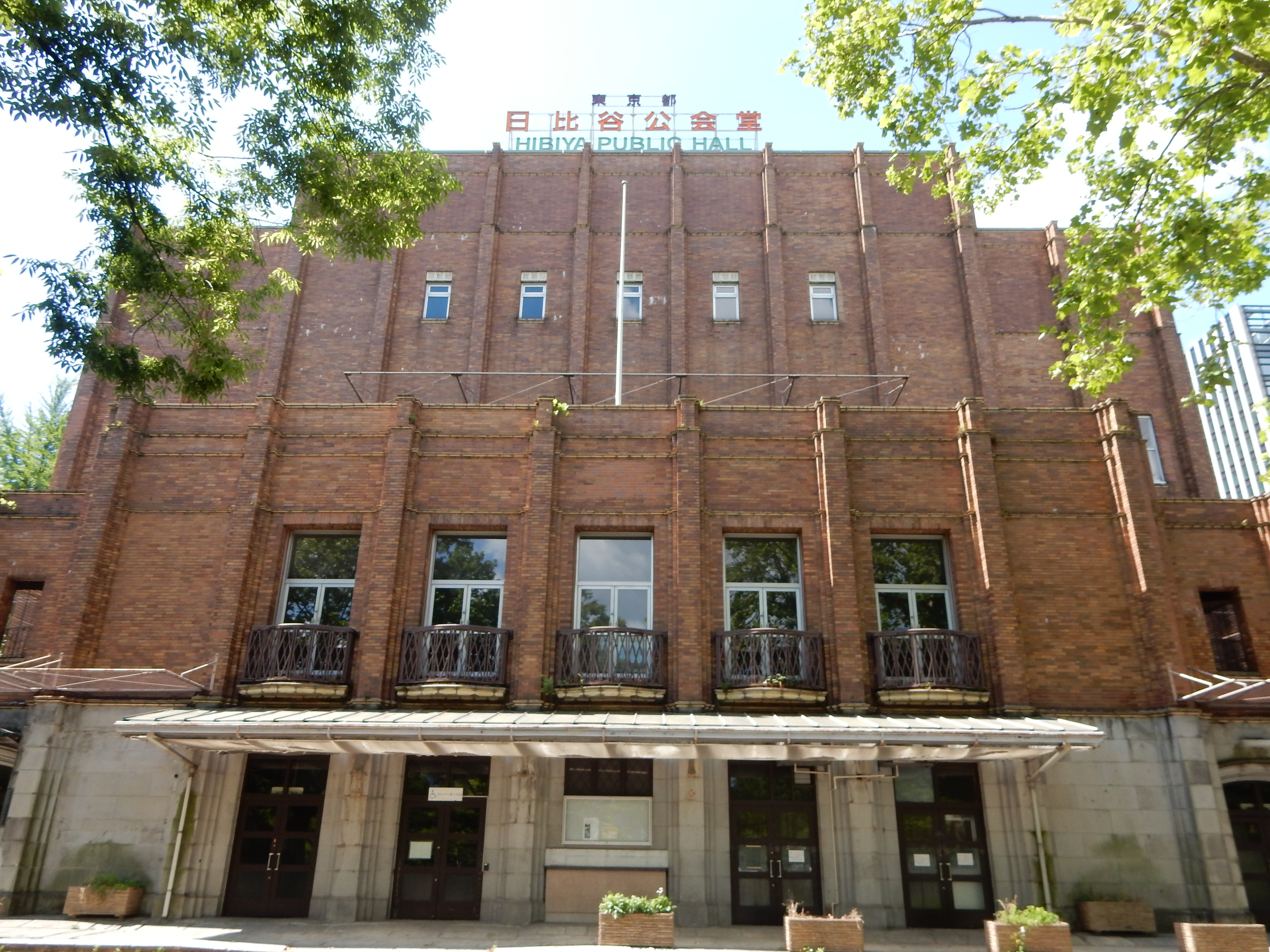
- Hibiya Public Hall
- Interactive map of Hibiya Public Hall 日比谷公会堂
- Location: 1-3 Hibiya Park, Chiyoda, Tokyo
- Coordinates: 35°40′18.1″N 139°45′20.4″E
- Owner: Tokyo Metropolitan Government
- Operator: Hibiya Public Hall and Open-Air Concert Hall Management Office (designated administrator)
- Capacity: 2,085
- Type: Concert hall, multipurpose

Construction
- Built: 1929
- Opened: October 19, 1929
- Architect: Kōichi Satō

Website
- hibiya-kokaido.com

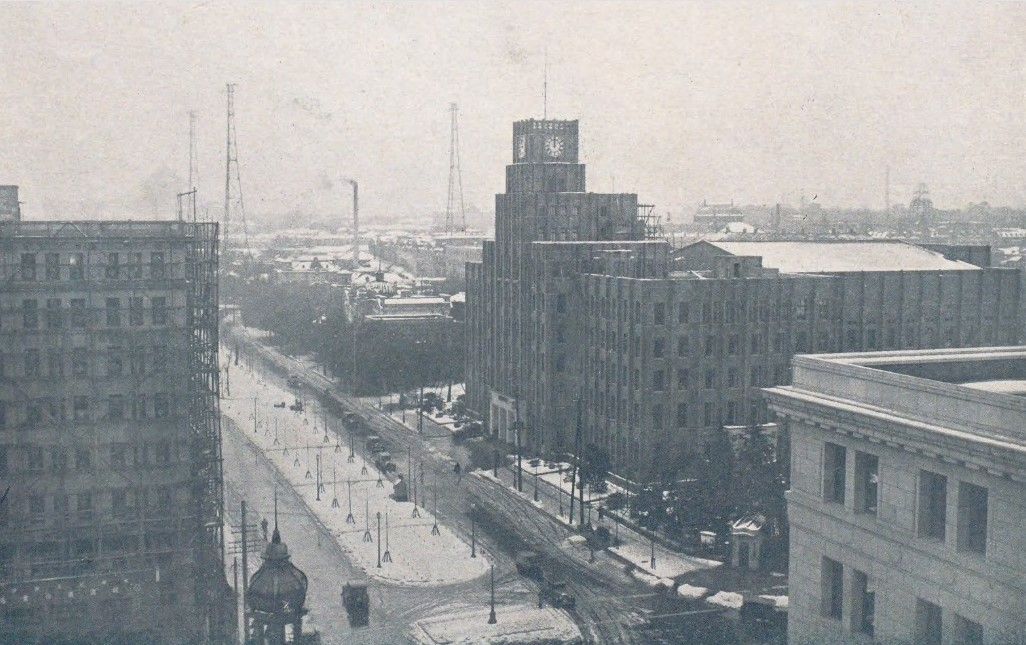
Hibiya Public Hall (right portion of the central building) around 1930, when it was known as Tokyo City Public Hall

The Hibiya Public Hall is a public hall located in Hibiya Park, Chiyoda, Tokyo, Japan. It was Japan's first full-scale concert hall and is designated as a Historic Building Selected by Tokyo and a Tokyo Metropolitan Designated Tangible Cultural Property (Structure).

Due to seismic issues, it has been closed for renovation since 2016. It is expected to reopen in 2029, the 100th anniversary of its opening.

== Overview ==
It forms a complex building with the Shisei Kaikan (Municipal Research Building), consisting of 1 basement level, 6 above-ground floors, and a 4-story tower. The office wing (Shisei Kaikan) faces the southern road, while the hall portion with the large auditorium protrudes northward into the park. The entrance to the public hall is on the park side, with the second floor designed as a balcony integrated with the park's gardens. The exterior is clad in brownish scratch tiles in a Neo-Gothic style.

As one of the early steel-frame reinforced concrete buildings, it is considered historically important in architectural engineering.

In March 2023, it was designated a Tokyo Metropolitan Tangible Cultural Property (Structure).

== History ==
=== Construction ===
After becoming mayor of Tokyo City in 1920 (Taishō 9), Shinpei Gotō advocated for a neutral research institute for municipal administration and established the Tokyo Municipal Research Association in 1922. With a large donation of 3.5 million yen (a huge sum at the time) from Zenjirō Yasuda, the plan was made for the association's hall (Shisei Kaikan) and an attached public hall.

The building was designed by Kōichi Satō, who won first place in a designated design competition, and was completed on October 19, 1929. The Gotō-Yasuda Memorial Tokyo Institute of Municipal Research (formerly the Tokyo Municipal Research Association) remains in the Shisei Kaikan portion. At the opening ceremony, the sound of tearing newspaper was reportedly audible to all attendees. Lessons from the 1923 Great Kantō earthquake led to the ground being reinforced with over 2,000 pine piles.

=== Development ===
It was long effectively Tokyo's only concert hall, hosting many professional orchestra concerts and recitals. On September 6, 1945, the first full-scale postwar concert featuring Yoshie Fujiwara and others was held here. However, with the opening of dedicated concert halls such as Tokyo Bunka Kaikan, NHK Hall, Hitomi Memorial Hall at Showa Women's University, Suntory Hall, Orchard Hall, and Tokyo Metropolitan Theatre, its status as a concert venue declined. Use shifted to lectures, events, and non-music purposes, and classical music concerts became rare.

Notably, during the 1975 Japan tour of the Bavarian Radio Symphony Orchestra, conductor Rafael Kubelík changed the program citing acoustic problems at the hall.

Concerned cultural figures advocated revival, leading to a 2007 autumn project: conductor Michiyoshi Inoue led the complete symphonies of Dmitri Shostakovich in the "Japan-Russia Friendship Shostakovich Symphonies Complete Performance Project 2007."

It has long hosted political speeches and mass rallies. The Liberal Democratic Party (Japan) held multiple extraordinary party congresses here for leadership elections.

The assassination of Inejirō Asanuma occurred on October 12, 1960, during a joint speech event at the hall.

Since April 1, 2006, management (together with Hibiya Open-Air Concert Hall) has been by a private group as Tokyo's designated administrator.

=== Renovation ===
On December 25, 2014, Tokyo announced the hall would close from 2016 for major renovation due to aging and seismic retrofitting.

Plans include restoring the interior closer to its original 1929 state. However, toilets (added later, including on a mezzanine) require expansion for barrier-free access, and a 2019 basic design revealed that matching the original appearance would violate the Entertainment Establishments Law toilet quota.

Adjustments led to a revised basic design in fiscal 2023, implementation design funding in the 2024 initial budget, and construction start from fiscal 2025 onward. Reopening is projected for 2029, the centennial year.

== Location and access ==
1-3 Hibiya Park, Chiyoda, Tokyo

- Tokyo Metro Hibiya Line / Tokyo Metro Chiyoda Line: Hibiya Station
- Tokyo Metro Hibiya Line / Tokyo Metro Marunouchi Line / Tokyo Metro Chiyoda Line: Kasumigaseki Station (Tokyo)
- Toei Mita Line: Uchisaiwaichō Station

== Gallery ==
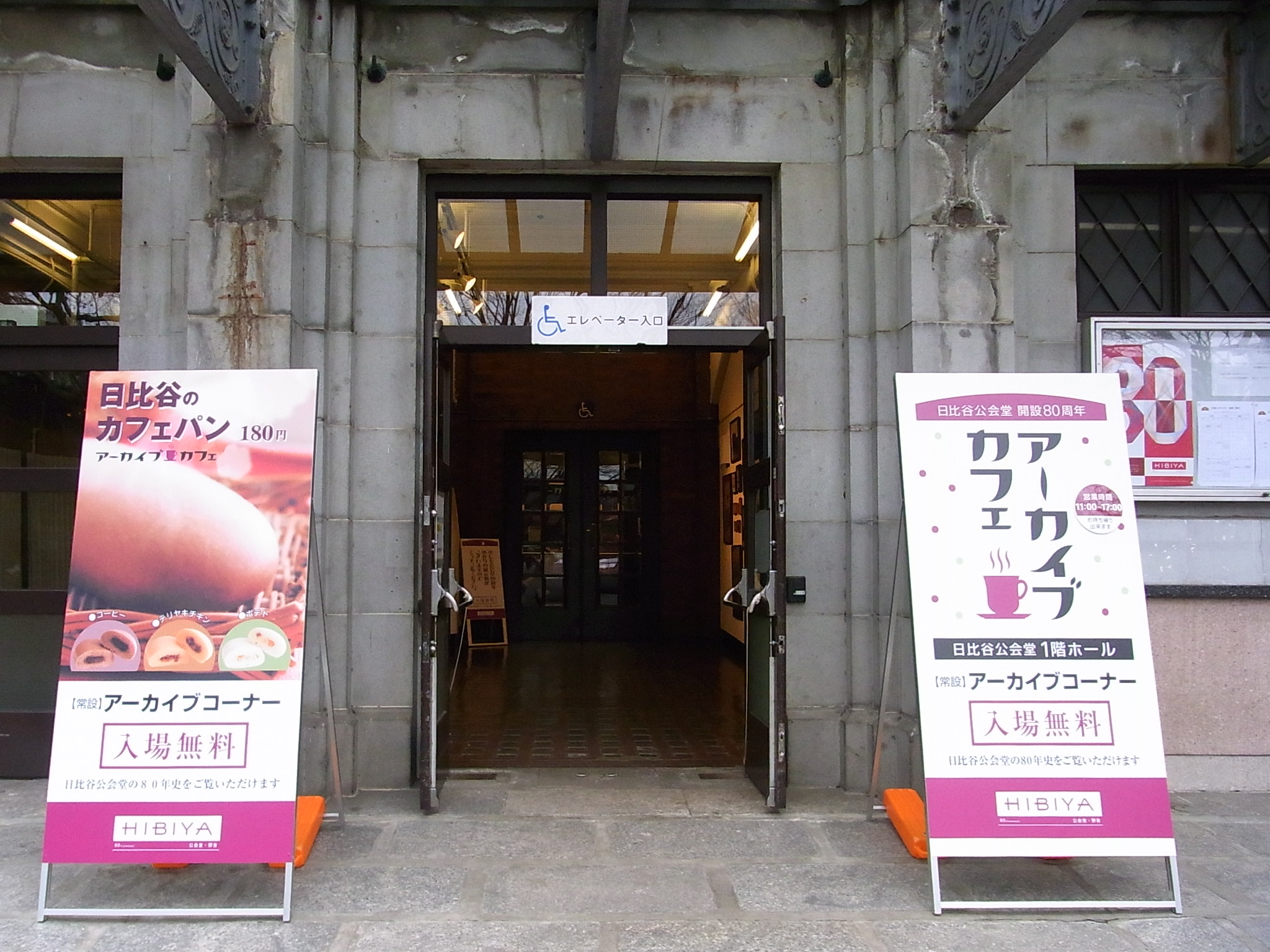
Hall entrance (photo February 12, 2010)

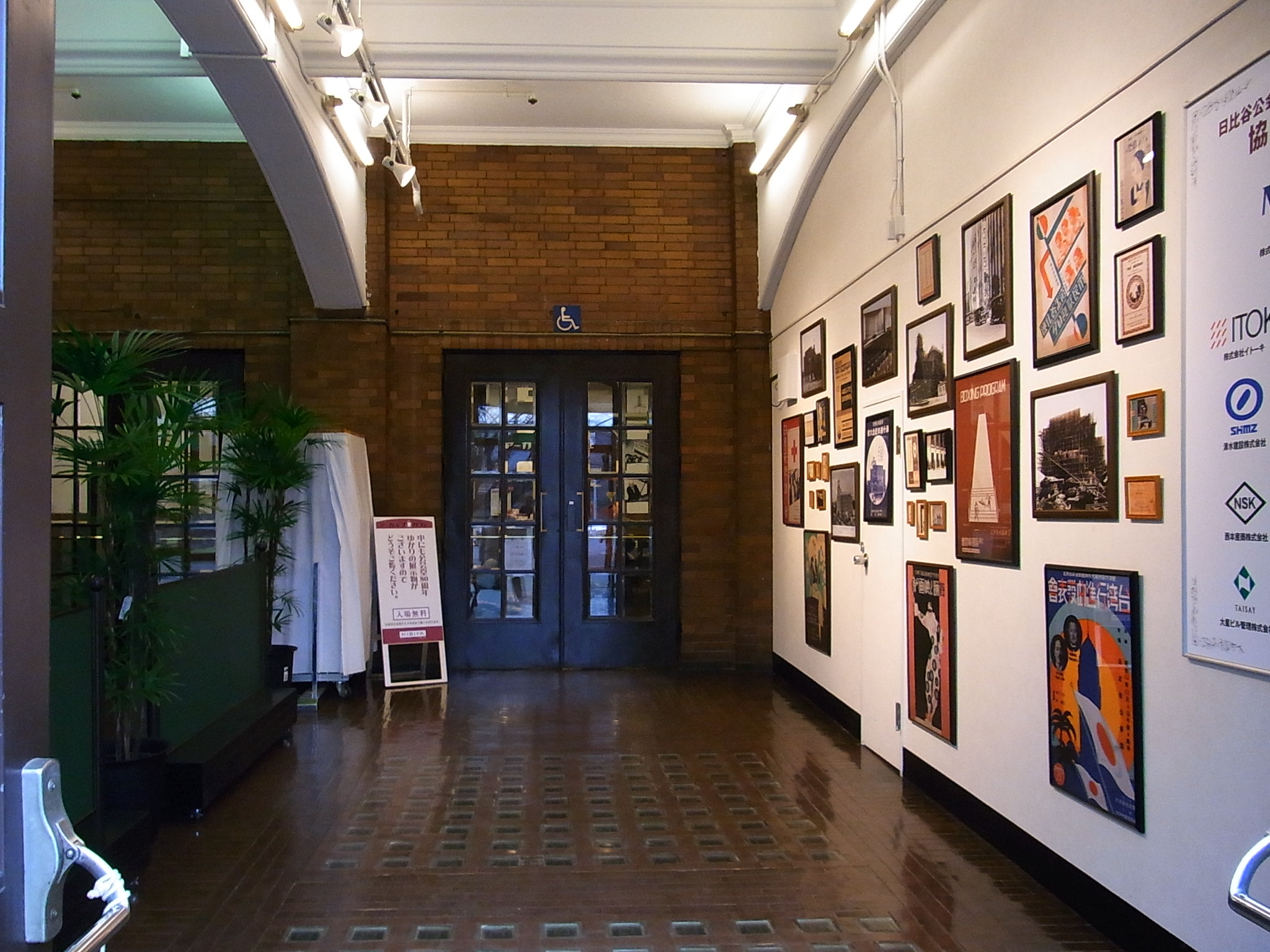
Exhibition space inside the hall (February 12, 2010)

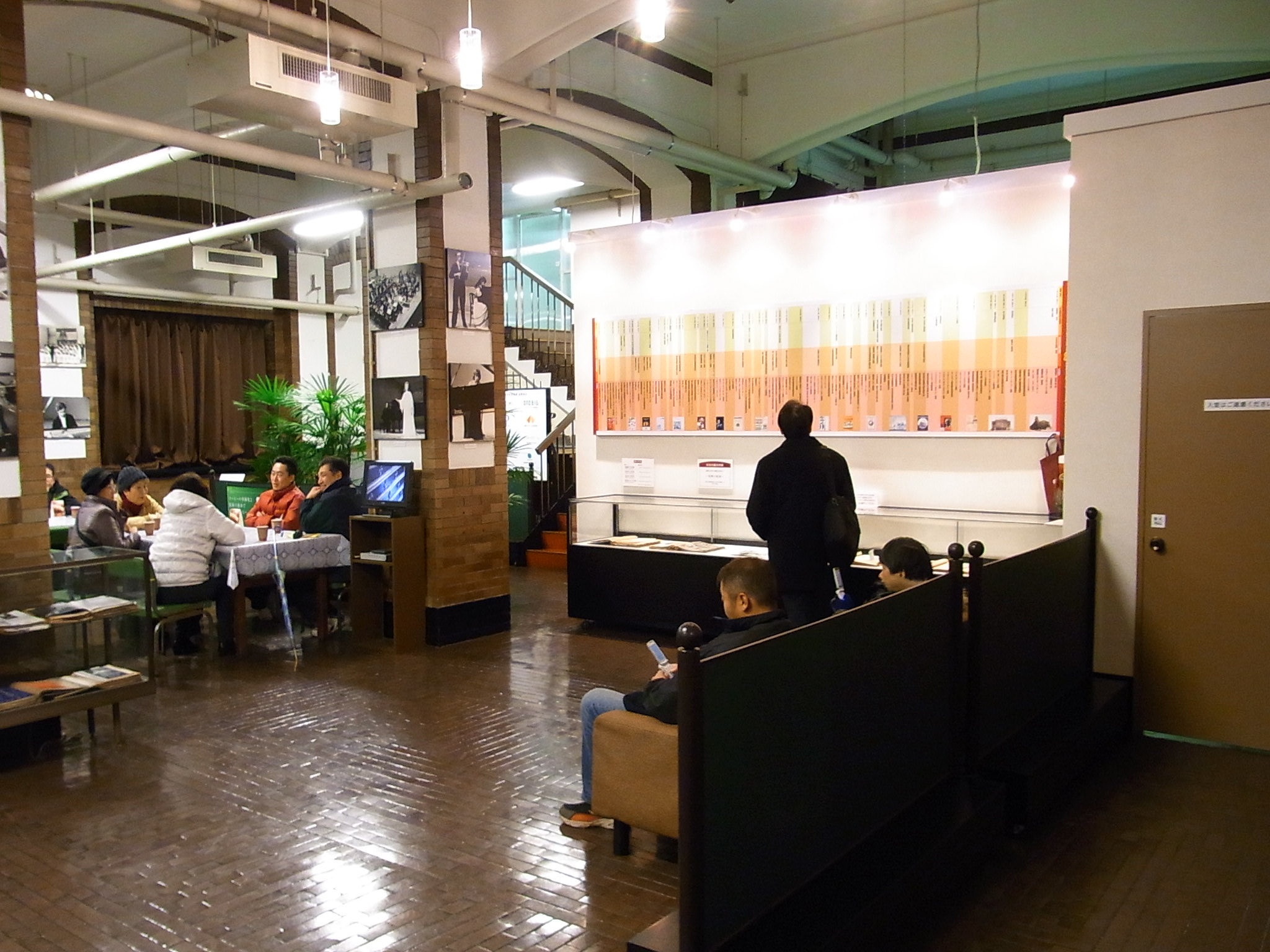
Exhibition space inside the hall (February 12, 2010)

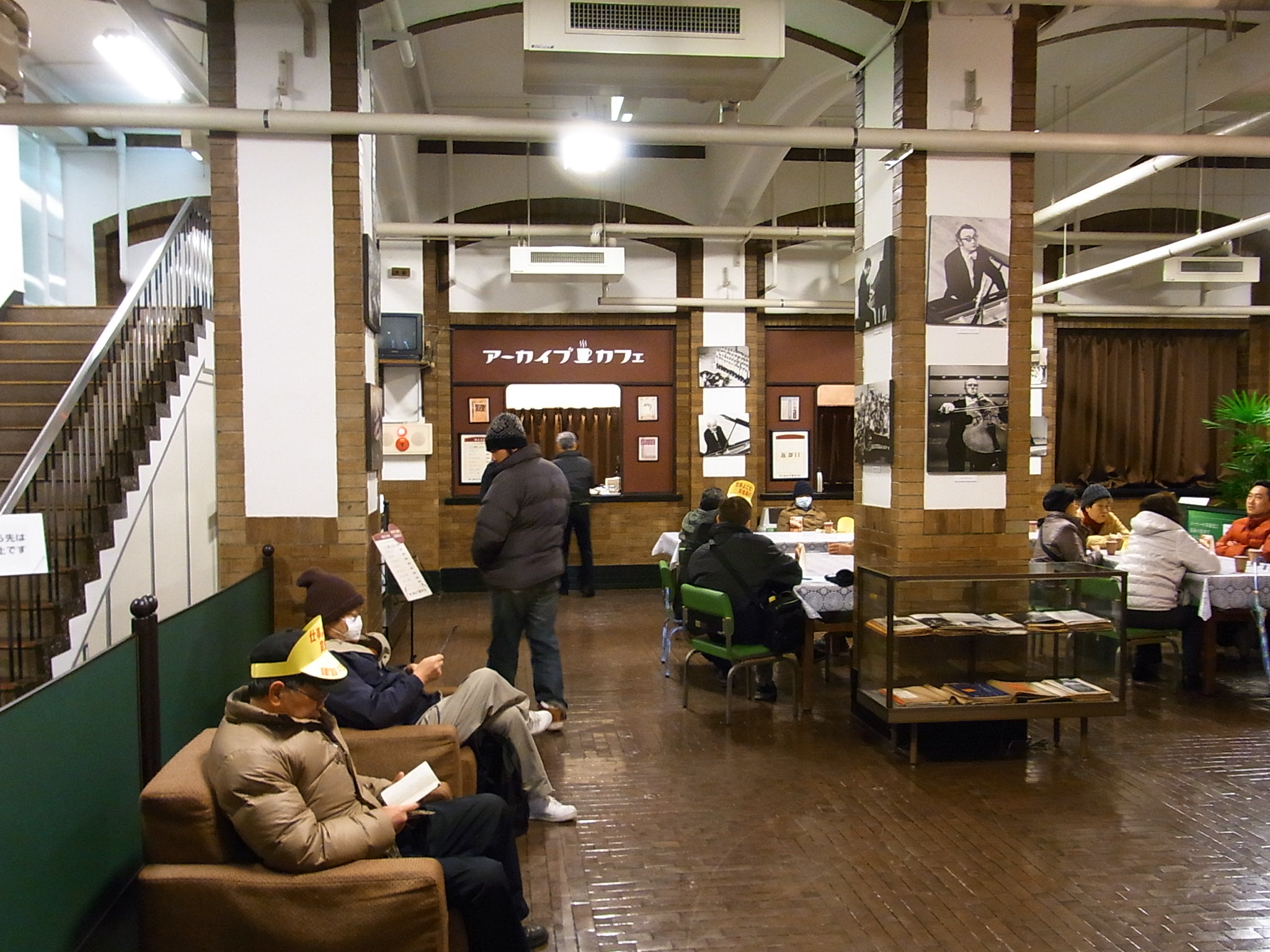
Café inside the hall (February 12, 2010)

== See also ==
- Assassination of Inejirō Asanuma
- Hibiya
- Hibiya Park
- Hibiya Open-Air Concert Hall
