= List of Blue Box episodes =

Key visual for the series

Blue Box is an anime television series based on Kouji Miura's manga series of the same name. An anime series adaptation, planned and produced by TMS Entertainment, (Note: Under the "Unlimited Produce by TMS" brand) with animation production by Telecom Animation Film, was announced in November 2023. It is directed by Yūichirō Yano, with Yūko Kakihara serving as series composer and screenplay writer, and Miho Tanino acting as chief animation director and character designer. The series aired for two consecutive cours from October 3, 2024, to March 27, 2025, on TBS and its affiliates. (Note: The first two episodes were released simultaneously on Netflix Japan, while subsequent episodes were released a week before their televised broadcast and international streaming release. As such, this article uses the latter dates.) Netflix licensed the series and is streaming it worldwide.

For the first cours, the opening theme song is "Same Blue" performed by Official Hige Dandism, and the ending theme song is "Teenage Blue" (ティーンエイジブルー) performed by Eve; for the second cours, the opening theme song is "Saraba" (然らば) performed by Macaroni Empitsu, and the ending theme song is "Contrast" (コントラスト) performed by Tomoo.

A second season was announced immediately following the airing of the finale episode of the first season, with Daisuke Sakō taking over as director and animated by Electric Circus. It premiered on TBS on October 4, 2026. The opening theme is "Anata no Hana no Iro" (あなたの花の色) by Aiko, and the ending theme is "Blue In" by Elsewhere Kikou.

== Series overview ==
Season	Episodes	Originally released	
Season	Episodes	First released	Last released
1	25	October 3, 2024	March 27, 2025
2	12	October 4, 2026	TBA

== Episodes ==
=== Season 1 (2024–25) ===
No. overall	No. in season	Title	Directed by (Note: Production staff information is taken from the ending credits of each episode)	Storyboarded by	Chief animation directed by	Original release date	Ref.
1	1	"Chinatsu Senpai" (Japanese: 千夏先輩)	Keiko Oyamada	Yūichirō Yano	Miho Tanino	October 3, 2024	
Taiki Inomata rushes to school in order to see Chinatsu Kano, whom he has a crush on. He confides to his friends Kyo Kasahara and Hina Chōno about his feelings for Chinatsu, who then comment how she is out of his league. Despite this, they offer Taiki tips on how he can break the ice. Sometime later, Taiki encounters Chinatsu on a cold morning and offers his scarf to her. Charmed, she begins calling Taiki by his full name. Feeling pride, Taiki further pursues this endeavor and meets with Chinatsu to know her better, opening up how he felt inspired to improve his badminton skills after seeing Chinatsu practicing her basketball skills when she missed the nationals. Taiki learns from his mother, who is close friends with Chinatsu's mother, that she and her family will be moving abroad, prompting him to run to the gym and bid good luck to Chinatsu. Chinatsu clears the confusion by stating she will be living with an acquaintance. The next morning, Taiki finds out Chinatsu will be staying in his house, much to his shock.
2	2	"You Have to Go to Nationals"; Transliteration: "Intāhai Itte Kudasai" (Japanese: インターハイ行ってください)	Hitomi Ezoe	Yūichirō Yano	Shinobu Isoko	October 10, 2024	
Chinatsu is welcomed into the Inomata household as Taiki attempts to process the sudden change in his status quo. At school, Kyo picks up on Taiki's cheerful attitude and advises him to keep it a secret. Taiki also expresses his desire to join the nationals to be able to reach Chinatsu's level, surprising Kyo. Chinatsu later learns of this and gifts him a good luck bracelet as she shows her own. The next day, Hina encounters Taiki exercising at the gym and suspects it has something to do with Chinatsu, teasing him in the process. Afraid of Hina learning the secret, Taiki distances himself from Chinatsu and later admits to her his worry of people gossiping over them if they are seen together, confusing Chinatsu as she was under the impression that Taiki and Hina liked each other. At the start of the school year, Taiki strives to work hard to achieve his goal. Hina bumps into him after school and they see Chinatsu walking towards their direction but then notice her talking to Taiki's badminton upperclassman Kengo Haryū, shocking him.
3	3	"Chii" (Japanese: ちー)	Harume Kosaka	Yūichirō Yano	Manabu Nii	October 17, 2024	
Despite reassurances that Haryū and Chinatsu are classmates, Taiki is troubled as he continues to see them talk and hears Haryū call Chinatsu "Chii". When Chinatsu notices his behavior and worries for him, Taiki calms down and tries to clear his mind to focus on the upcoming matches. This, however, fails after hearing his upperclassmen comment on Haryū and Chinatsu hanging out lately. This is further exacerbated when Taiki plays a match against Haryū. Taiki manages to finish the game with a better performance despite losing to Haryū, which Chinatsu commends when she and Taiki practice playing badminton after the game. He also learns that "Chii" is a nickname given to Chinatsu by her classmates. Taiki is notified the following day he will be playing doubles with Haryū. His heart sinks when Haryū hears him mentioning Chinatsu and teases him as they rigorously practice. Haryū then introduces him to his and Chinatsu's friend group, praising his skills. Taiki later learns that Haryū already has a girlfriend and Chinatsu was assisting him, realizing he was being toyed with by Haryū, much to his annoyance and frustration.
4	4	"If He Wins"; Transliteration: "Aitsu ga Kattara" (Japanese: あいつが勝ったら)	Masato Kitagawa	Masayoshi Nishida	Shinobu Isoko, Manabu Nii & Aya Miyajima	October 24, 2024	
Taiki begins to get accustomed to living with Chinatsu after a month has passed. He later receives a text message from Chinatsu informing him that he accidentally grabbed her gym uniform, which he eventually returns. That night, Taiki continues practicing for the upcoming badminton preliminaries at home. Seeing this, Chinatsu asks him to take it easy and rest. When Chinatsu adds he can attempt again the following year, however, Taiki is left despondent, knowing Chinatsu will graduate by that time. On the day of the preliminaries, Taiki and Haryū begin advancing through the matches when they meet Haryū's previous doubles partner Shoichiro Kishi. Kishi calls Haryū out for not giving him Chinatsu's number and he challenges Haryū to a singles match to uphold the deal. Haryū accepts and lets him play against Taiki, much to the latter's annoyance. Arriving home, Taiki overhears Chinatsu share her insecurities of discouraging him to his mother, motivating him to win against Kishi. Taiki and Kishi begin their match the next day as Haryū and Kyo watch on. When Chinatsu and her teammates arrive, Kyo shares to her the stakes involved and how much she motivates Taiki.
5	5	"Aquarium"; Transliteration: "Suizokukan" (Japanese: 水族館)	Keiko Oyamada	Yūichirō Yano	Miho Tanino	October 31, 2024	
Kyo proposes to Chinatsu on taking Taiki to an aquarium as Taiki wins the match against Kishi. As his peers congratulate him, Taiki receives Chinatsu's offer, surprising him. Witnessing this, Hina congratulates him on getting closer with Chinatsu and calls their upcoming outing a date, though her friend Niina Shimazaki takes note of her looking sullen after separating from Taiki. Taiki nervously prepares for the outing, but he oversleeps and rushes to the aquarium. Chinatsu apologizes to Taiki for discouraging him the previous day, which he accepts, adding he is open for Chinatsu to talk about her worries. At school, Taiki thanks Kyo on setting up the outing as Kyo brings up the possibility of Chinatsu liking him back, taking Taiki off-guard and Kyo and Hina make him focus back on practicing. Hina later has a chance meeting with Chinatsu and sees a keychain from the aquarium, making Hina believe Taiki has a chance with Chinatsu while Hina fondly recounts her interactions with Taiki. Chinatsu leaves but forgets her phone, prompting Hina to return it when she discovers Chinatsu entering Taiki's house and talking with him, disconcerting Hina as she begins to develop feelings for Taiki.
6	6	"Wish Me Luck"; Transliteration: "Ganbarette Itte" (Japanese: がんばれって言って)	Yasuro Tsuchiya	Issei Iba	Miho Tanino, Manabu Nii & Shinobu Isoko	November 7, 2024	
Hina confronts Taiki and Chinatsu on their relationship, forcing Taiki to explain the circumstances. While she understands the situation, Hina expresses her dismay that Taiki kept it a secret from her. Hina becomes distracted with the revelation during practice while being put under pressure from the expectations of her peers and is further troubled upon learning Taiki and Chinatsu motivate each other in reaching the nationals, hindering her ability to perform well. Noticing her shortcomings, Hina practices more, but while thinking on where to improve after a session, Hina bumps into a student and sprains her ankle, sending her into a panic before Taiki comes to her aid. He lends an ear to Hina's worries as she also subtly references her jealousy for Chinatsu. After recovering, Hina asks Taiki to wish her luck on her practice; Hina achieves first place in the qualifiers. At home, Chinatsu shares to Taiki on encountering Hina where Taiki shows his enthusiasm for her, making Chinatsu assume she is getting in the way of their relationship.
7	7	"Can I Have One?"; Transliteration: "Hitotsu Chōdai?" (Japanese: 一つちょうだい？)	Hitomi Ezoe	Hitomi Ezoe	Manabu Nii, Aya Miyajima, Miho Tanino & Shinobu Isoko	November 14, 2024	
Taiki begins vigorously practicing for the qualifiers. When Chinatsu mentions her qualifiers and Taiki's coinciding on the same day, Taiki wonders if she is looking forward to his match. They later cross paths while walking home and they head to a shrine and pray on reaching the nationals. The next day after their team's qualifiers, Chinatsu and her friend Nagisa Funami overhear their rivals comment on Chinatsu's lackluster performance. Taiki later notices the team's melancholic behavior and eavesdrops on Nagisa's frustration with the situation. Chinatsu spots him and shares on wanting to prove her rivals wrong with her skills. Inspired by Chinatsu's drive, Taiki practices harder with Haryū. After wrapping up, Kyo questions Taiki if he plans to ask Chinatsu out when he reaches the nationals, but Taiki wishes to not yet force his feelings on her. They encounter Haryū at a convenience store and are later joined by Hina, Chinatsu, and their friends. Hina grabs a bite from Taiki's snack and expresses on wanting to give him gifts. Seeing this, an envious Chinatsu also grabs a bite, leaving Taiki perplexed with her intentions.
8	8	"Score!"; Transliteration: "Ippon!" (Japanese: 一本っ！)	Shunji Yoshida	Masayoshi Nishida	Miho Tanino, Manabu Nii & Aya Miyajima	November 21, 2024	
Chinatsu sees Taiki exercising for his qualifiers and joins him. While discussing their upcoming matches, Chinatsu asks him what kind of cheer Taiki's badminton club uses. At the qualifiers, Taiki and Haryū watch the doubles match of Sajikawa High player and competitor Shōta Hyōdō and take note of his playing style. Taiki and Haryū play against Hyōdō as Hyōdō's teammate Shūji Yusa observes their gameplay, taking special attention on Taiki's playing. Chinatsu later learns that Taiki lost the match and while thinking of how to cheer him up, she sees his notes and writes words of encouragement. The next day, Taiki plays a singles match against Yusa but also loses. Hina visits the qualifiers and hears about Taiki's performance, leading her to check up on him; Taiki opens up to Hina on doubting his ability to reach the nationals. After the qualifiers conclude, Taiki strives to continue improving. Taiki overhears Chinatsu reaching the nationals upon arriving home, frustrating him further despite being proud of her.
9	9	"I'll Be Rooting For You"; Transliteration: "Ōen Suru yo" (Japanese: 応援するよ)	Yuka Yamato	Yuka Yamato	Miho Tanino & Aya Miyajima	November 28, 2024	
Upon learning about the upcoming exams, Taiki begins to study as he observes Chinatsu's team practicing for the nationals; seeing this, Taiki instead practices his badminton skills, leaving Kyo and Hina worried. The badminton club is tasked to write their goals, which Taiki uses to write on improving his skills. Taiki balances his studies and badminton practice as he continues to hear of Chinatsu's progress, discouraging him. Sometime later, Taiki falls ill after overworking himself and wonders if he failed to achieve his promises. Chinatsu reassures him and tends to his health despite Taiki warning she might contract his illness. Chinatsu asks why he did not write reaching the nationals on his goal note after seeing it during the club activity, leading Taiki to open up on being overconfident with his expectations. Chinatsu shares she harbors the same doubts as Taiki and replies he should still aim for his goal while setting expectations. Hearing this, Taiki feels calmed by her empathy and states on writing Chinatsu's advice on his goal note before losing his balance, prompting Chinatsu to catch him as she also falls on top of him and they share a gaze, with Chinatsu leaning closer.
10	10	"It's Not a Good Thing"; Transliteration: "Yokunai Koto" (Japanese: 良くないこと)	Ryōsuke Azuma	Masayoshi Nishida	Shinobu Isoko	December 5, 2024	
Chinatsu leans in to fix the patch on Taiki's head, leaving him restless throughout the night. The next day, Taiki helps Haryū and his class clean the school's pool when Haryū asks him on his progress with Chinatsu. Taiki consults him for relationship advice and Haryū mentions Chinatsu keeping a distance towards boys she is not interested in, prompting Taiki to wonder on the recent events. Taiki later thanks Chinatsu on tending to his health as he notices a flustered Chinatsu returning the gesture; he impulsively grabs her hand, leaving him embarrassed. Chinatsu then talks to Nagisa on love as Nagisa humors the idea of an individual falling in love with someone after living with them for a period of time. Later during dinner, Chinatsu learns of the commitment of Taiki's parents in taking care of her as she and Taiki head out to buy food. The two engage in small talk when an oncoming car almost hits them, with Taiki grabbing Chinatsu by her arm out of harm's way. Upon experiencing this action, Chinatsu asks Taiki to forget the recent events and apologizes for her carelessness, causing Taiki to believe she is setting boundaries between them as summer vacation begins.
11	11	"Uncool!"; Transliteration: "Dasai zo!!" (Japanese: ダサいぞ！！)	Mizuki Iwata	Masayoshi Nishida	Shinobu Isoko	December 12, 2024	
Taiki joins his classmates in accomplishing summer homework as he and Hina overhear from other students about a summer festival happening soon. Taiki recalls to Hina how he cheered her up after she missed the fireworks display of the previous festival; a flustered Hina requests him to accompany her to the festival, and Taiki agrees. Some days later during practice, Haryū invites Taiki to a practice session with his seniors taking place on the same day as the festival. Taiki updates Hina on his schedule and asks her who else is joining them at the festival, leaving Hina dismayed as she wanted only Taiki to join. After inviting Kyo along, Taiki opens up to Hina with his concerns on progressing his friendship with Chinatsu, causing Hina to reassure him to take care of himself and compliment his ability to stay positive before running off. Taiki joins Haryū in the practice session and encounters Hyōdō, who gives advice on his stances. After practice, Taiki plans to head to the festival when Kyo messages on being unable to go, forcing him to contend on going alone with Hina. Taiki arrives at the festival and sees Hina in a yukata.
12	12	"Girls..."; Transliteration: "Onnanoko tte" (Japanese: 女の子って)	Keiko Oyamada	Yuka Yamato & Yūichirō Yano	Miho Tanino, Manabu Nii & Aya Miyajima	December 19, 2024	
When Chinatsu and her friends visit the festival, she notices Taiki and Hina hanging out, surprising her due to initially hearing from Taiki earlier in the day that he planned to go with a group. A nervous Hina becomes conscious of her appearance around Taiki when he compliments her on looking cute, satisfying Hina and they watch the fireworks. Taiki separates from Hina during the break and sees Chinatsu comforting a lost child, prompting Taiki to assist her in finding the child's mother; they encounter Haryū's girlfriend Karen Moriya along the way, who secretly roots for them. The two eventually reunite the lost child with her mother and later part ways. Taiki returns to Hina as the fireworks resume; Taiki wonders where his future will lead him. The next day, during a break in practice, Chinatsu sees a sleeping Taiki and nervously asks if he is dating Hina, revealing she was hurt with Taiki lying about his intentions of attending the festival, and leaves before Taiki wakes up.
13	13	"I Want a Back-and-Forth Rally"; Transliteration: "Rarī Shitai Desu" (Japanese: ラリーしたいです)	Ryōsuke Azuma	Masayoshi Nishida	Miho Tanino, Shinobu Isoko, Manabu Nii & Aya Miyajima	January 3, 2025 (Note: Episode 13 aired at 12:55 a.m. JST, 59 minutes after the original air time on TBS)	
Chinatsu leaves for the nationals and Taiki wishes her good luck. He then learns from Kyo that Chinatsu's group saw him with Hina during the festival, worrying Taiki. He travels to the badminton nationals to support Haryū and meets Karen, who shares she is aware of Taiki's crush on Chinatsu; Taiki also learns of Karen and Haryū's support for each other, and Karen explains how they made their relationship work despite both focusing on their aspirations. The two then cheer for Haryū as he faces off Hyōdō once more, but he begins losing to him and Haryū notices Karen looking concerned. As Haryū recounts how he fell in love with Karen, he fights back to show her he will not give up and scores a tie, though he loses to Hyōdō much to his frustration. After Karen encourages Taiki to not overthink his relationship with Chinatsu, she catches up to Haryū and he promises to win again for her.
14	14	"What's the Connection?"; Transliteration: "Dōiu Bunmyaku?" (Japanese: どういう文脈？)	Hitomi Ezoe	Yūichirō Yano & Yuka Yamato	Miho Tanino, Shinobu Isoko, Manabu Nii & Aya Miyajima	January 9, 2025	
Chinatsu's basketball team begins preparing for the nationals and she becomes pressured upon hearing from Nagisa their seniors would be leaving the team after the game. Back at school, Taiki wonders how Chinatsu would be performing at the game before Hina sees him and they hang out. Hina reveals she scored a podium position at the nationals, surprising him; Hina then takes him to a playground where she notices Taiki's worry for Chinatsu. She calms him down by playing a game where the loser must share a secret and Taiki easily wins. Hina confesses to Taiki on her feelings for him, though she acknowledges his crush on Chinatsu and reassures him not to give an immediate response before leaving ahead. A speechless Taiki looks back and realizes Hina was hinting her feelings in their past interactions. Arriving home, he learns from his mother that Chinatsu's team lost the game. The next day, Taiki and Hina engage in banter with Hina teasing him and boasting about her confession, which Chinatsu overhears.
15	15	"August 26"; Transliteration: "Hachi-tsuki Nijūroku-nichi" (Japanese: 8月26日)	Takahiro Ōkawa	Takahiro Ōkawa	Miho Tanino, Shinobu Isoko, Manabu Nii & Aya Miyajima	January 16, 2025	
With the nationals concluding, Chinatsu also celebrates her birthday. Taiki notes she has been feeling down from losing their game as he thinks of his present to her. Later, Chinatsu talks to her mom on her worries of being promoted as the team's vice-captain and her need to improve after losing when she encounters Taiki, who takes her to the beach to clear her mind and presents her a birthday cake. They are unable to go home as heavy rain suddenly pours and the trains are out of service, forcing the two to stay at a nearby inn. Taiki and Chinatsu decide to pass the time by playing boardgames when they are interrupted by Nagisa calling Chinatsu, prompting Taiki to stay quiet as he eavesdrops on Nagisa supporting her amid her worries and their visit to the festival; hearing this, Taiki explains the circumstances of his outing with Hina and apologizes, which Chinatsu takes to also apologize on setting boundaries with him. In the following morning, Chinatsu wakes up refreshed to start anew after her birthday.
16	16	"Unfair Woman"; Transliteration: "Zurui Onna" (Japanese: ずるい女)	Jirō Arimoto	Masayoshi Nishida	Miho Tanino, Shinobu Isoko, Manabu Nii & Aya Miyajima	January 23, 2025	
Taiki works as the class representative for his class on the upcoming school festival, accomplishing their errands while his class prepares for a play on Snow White. He also learns that Chinatsu will be staying with her mother for a month as her mother returned from abroad to take care of her father, causing Taiki to see her infrequently the next day at school; he learns however that Chinatsu was also attempting to find him, leading the two to try and get accustomed to the current norm. Chinatsu contemplates on her friendship with Taiki with Hina in the picture after hearing her mother voice her opinion on complicated relationships, as Kyo voices his concern to Hina on her pursuing Taiki despite his crush on Chinatsu. While fulfilling a class errand, Hina and Chinatsu encounter each other, which Hina uses to proclaim to Chinatsu she had confessed her feelings to Taiki.
17	17	"Of Course I Want to See It"; Transliteration: "Mitai Desho" (Japanese: 見たいでしょ)	Yoshiko Okuda	Yoshiko Okuda	Miho Tanino, Shinobu Isoko, Manabu Nii & Aya Miyajima	January 30, 2025	
Chinatsu expresses surprise towards Hina's proclamation as the latter runs off. Taiki's badminton skills gradually improve, though he feels anxious on facing Yusa at an upcoming practice match against Sajikawa High. Hina and Chinatsu separately learn of the match and tell Taiki they will watch and cheer him on, giving Taiki the drive to further improve. Later, while preparing for the school festival, Taiki meets with Hina and helps her rehearse the "true love's kiss" scene for the Snow White play. Taiki expresses admiration towards Hina's dedication, which Hina reciprocates. Hina then shares to Taiki on imagining the latter kissing her and asks him if he wants to act it out, leaving the two flustered. Taiki declines and he kneels in embarrassment towards his conflicting feelings for Hina. Haryū and Chinatsu later discuss about Taiki and his aimless motivation, where Chinatsu encourages Haryū to help Taiki. The next day, Taiki leaves the school gym to accomplish an errand when he encounters Yusa, who is finding the gym.
18	18	"I Know"; Transliteration: "Watashi wa Shitteru" (Japanese: 私は知ってる)	Daisuke Tsukushi	Yūichirō Yano	Miho Tanino, Shinobu Isoko, Manabu Nii & Aya Miyajima	February 6, 2025	
The practice match between Eimei High and Sajikawa High begins in earnest, and Taiki and his teammates observe Yusa defeat his opponents. Yusa learns he would be playing against Taiki, and they begin the match. Hina and Chinatsu nervously watch Taiki's match, and Taiki gradually loses to Yusa. Taiki ponders on his inability to improve and indecisiveness towards his own feelings, motivating him to perform on par with Yusa. Chinatsu realizes Taiki's determination despite him facing hardship was rooted from her own determination. Taiki wins against Yusa, much to everyone's surprise; Taiki and Yusa later shake hands as Yusa acknowledges him as an opponent and equal. Taiki is left relieved and believes he can now be able to move forward, and Chinatsu congratulates him. Chinatsu shares that Hina also watched and asks about their play and the kiss scene, and Taiki tries brushing it off. Later at night, Taiki dreams of his conflicting feelings for both Chinatsu and Hina, and he wakes up much to his bewilderment.
19	19	"I've Got Plans"; Transliteration: "Yotei Arun da" (Japanese: 予定あるんだ)	Keiko Oyamada	Yuka Yamato	Miho Tanino, Shinobu Isoko, Manabu Nii & Aya Miyajima	February 13, 2025	
As the day of the school festival slowly approaches, Taiki conducts final preparations for the Snow White play and he sees Hina in her Snow White costume, leaving him in awe. A flustered Hina turns away from Taiki and continues practicing. The next day, Chinatsu invites Taiki to watch a music performance during the school festival, and Taiki accepts. Taiki visits Chinatsu's class, where he learns that her class is doing a maid cafe theme for the festival. Taiki sees Chinatsu in maid uniform serving patrons, flustering him. Taiki and Chinatsu later meet to watch the music performance, and Taiki enjoys his outing with Chinatsu. Taiki asks Chinatsu her reason for inviting him, and Chinatsu whispers her response; however, Taiki did not catch her response and Chinatsu refuses to elaborate, much to his dismay. Taiki participates in a fortune telling session with badminton teammate Ryōsuke Nishida and learns of an ordeal that will befall him, leaving him nervous as Nishida's previous predictions have come true. Taiki encounters his class worrying on finding a replacement actor for the prince in the play, leading the class to set their eyes on Taiki.
20	20	"As One of Her Closest Friends"; Transliteration: "Shinyū to Shite" (Japanese: 親友として)	Yūma Suzuki	Yūma Suzuki	Miho Tanino, Shinobu Isoko, Manabu Nii & Aya Miyajima	February 20, 2025	
Despite his protests and stage fright, Taiki reluctantly agrees to substitute for the role of the prince after realizing the effort made by Hina and the class. Chinatsu heads to the theater to watch as she is informed by Taiki of the role change. Before the start of the play, a nervous Taiki and Hina encourage the other to do their best. Kyo arrives to oversee the play and eavesdrops on two students discussing Taiki and Hina's relationship, leading him to wonder the difference between platonic love and romantic love. Taiki grows anxious on acting out the kiss scene with Hina, leading him to fake the kiss. Although he is relieved, a prop suddenly falls on Hina, and Taiki jumps in to shield her. Taiki falls on top of Hina and their heads make contact, causing everyone to misinterpret the incident as the two kissing and they gossip about their relationship. Taiki expresses annoyance towards the rumors and demands people to not discuss about it. Kyo later asks Taiki if he reciprocates Hina's feelings, and he urges him to think about it. The next day, after the end of the festival, Taiki learns that Chinatsu is moving back into his house, and he wonders what Chinatsu thought about the incident.
21	21	"A Chance to Blossom"; Transliteration: "Hana ga Saku Made" (Japanese: 花が咲くまで)	Yuka Yamato	Yūichirō Yano & Yuka Yamato	Miho Tanino, Shinobu Isoko, Manabu Nii & Aya Miyajima	February 27, 2025	
Chinatsu brushes off the rumors, though Taiki remains worried for her thoughts. At a sleepover in Karen's apartment, Chinatsu opens up to Karen that she is interested in Taiki after knowing him more, though she elaborates it is not yet romantic; she also expresses being unable to focus on her feelings due to being distracted with basketball and the recent rumors between Taiki and Hina. Karen points out Chinatsu's cautious approach to falling in love, and she asks Chinatsu to be ready on facing her feelings for Taiki when the time comes. At the school gym the following morning, Karen's sister Ayame introduces herself as the badminton club's new team manager, and Taiki guides her on her duties. Chinatsu encounters the two and notices their quick bond, causing her to wonder back on Karen's words about falling in love.
22	22	"Inota!" (Japanese: いのた！)	Risa Suzuki	Risa Suzuki	Miho Tanino	March 6, 2025	
Ayame presses Karen on information about the person Chinatsu is interested in. Worried that Ayame may find out it is Taiki, Karen describes a person different from Taiki to satisfy Ayame's curiosity. Ayame also catches on to Hina's crush on Taiki during practice, but she learns he has not given his answer to Hina's confession. The sports clubs also prepare for an upcoming training camp, allowing Ayame to help Hina on her feelings for Taiki. Meanwhile, Chinatsu hears from her teammates of a ritual conducted at the camp where two people who ask each other out during a campfire may live a loving life. The clubs travel to the camp and immediately conduct practices. At night, Nishida invites Taiki, Kyo, and Ayame to a card game where they must follow a command to whoever will take the turn, with Hina, Chinatsu and Nagisa, and Haryū also joining. Ayame rigs the game to reach Taiki's turn, and Taiki is shocked upon learning his command is to confess his feelings to the person he likes. Taiki follows the command, and the group eagerly awaits his response.
23	23	"Spinning"; Transliteration: "Guruguru" (Japanese: ぐるぐる)	Hitomi Ezoe	Yūko Horikawa	Miho Tanino, Manabu Nii, Aya Miyajima & Shinobu Isoko	March 13, 2025	
Kyo answers the command on Taiki's behalf with a different person, and he notices Taiki being unsure on his feelings. Taiki decides to go on an evening jog, allowing him to thoroughly think on his feelings for both Chinatsu and Hina. He then crosses paths with Chinatsu, who is assisting an elderly woman, and Taiki decides to help her to the woman's home. The elderly woman thanks Taiki and Chinatsu, and she remarks that Taiki acted like a boyfriend to Chinatsu. She further points out how Taiki looked worried and went out to find her, taking Chinatsu by surprise. The next day, Taiki continues practicing, and Hina catches a glance of him before leaving. Niina, wondering why Hina and Taiki are not yet going out, suggests to Hina that she can ask Taiki for his answer at the campfire ritual. Hina refuses, stating she does not need an answer until Taiki also falls for her.
24	24	"A Roller Coaster"; Transliteration: "Jetto Kōsutā (Note: Jet Coaster)" (Japanese: ジェットコースター)	Yoshiko Okuda	Yoshiko Okuda	Miho Tanino, Manabu Nii, Aya Miyajima & Shinobu Isoko	March 20, 2025	
Hina grows increasingly anxious on her feelings for Taiki despite being aware of his crush on Chinatsu, as the sports clubs set up the campfire. Hina also reflects on the events since she confessed to Taiki, and she imagines a reality where she and Taiki are dating, flustering Hina. Hina internally remarks that she is willing to wait on his answer for the foreseeable future. The campfire begins in the evening, and Ayame overhears Taiki heading to the gym. Ayame plots on getting him and Hina together by leading Hina to the gym under the excuse of acquiring equipment. Hina and Taiki meet, and they later bond. Hina finally asks Taiki on who he was going to confess his feelings during the card game, while reaffirming her love for him despite the circumstances. However, Taiki reiterates his crush towards Chinatsu and turns down Hina's reciprocations, explaining that his indecisiveness towards his own feelings may hurt them both. Faced with the reality of the situation, Hina runs away and breaks down in tears.
25	25	"Even So"; Transliteration: "Sore de mo" (Japanese: それでも)	Keiko Oyamada & Yasuro Tsuchiya	Yūichirō Yano & Yuka Yamato	Miho Tanino, Manabu Nii, Aya Miyajima & Shinobu Isoko	March 27, 2025	
Ayame witnesses Hina crying and comforts her, leading Ayame to become remorseful over her attempt in getting her and Taiki together. Kyo realizes the situation through a sullen Ayame, and he remarks that Taiki made his decision, adding that Taiki and Hina worked better as friends. Meanwhile, Taiki finishes a match with Haryū, and Haryū shares that despite being faced with losses, he must nevertheless move forward and grow stronger. The clubs return to school, and Taiki heads home with Chinatsu. Taiki asks her on going out to a mall, which Chinatsu agrees. Ayame tries to cheer up Hina, but is only partially successful, when they encounter one of Ayame's ex-boyfriends, who negatively comments on Ayame's demeanor. Hina stands up for Ayame, stating his negative comments are a way to protect himself from further pain before tearing up. Hina distances herself from Taiki and grows depressed upon having to see him and Chinatsu frequently, growing cold towards him and beginning to resent Chinatsu even more. Ayame becomes angry at Taiki for his decision and perceived lack of care, questioning him about what he even sees in Chinatsu. Despite her anger, Taiki explains he still cares for Hina even he doesn't love her, but he addresses their friendship will not be the same and waits for Hina's response, possibly hinting at her cutting ties with him. Taiki later leaves to meet with Chinatsu on their outing, feeling more confident in deepening his relationship with her.

=== Season 2 (2026) ===
No. overall	No. in season	Title	Directed by	Storyboarded by	Chief animation directed by	Original release date
26	1	"Déjà Vu"; Transliteration: "Dejabu" (Japanese: デジャブ)	Daisuke Sakō	Daisuke Sakō	Miho Tanino	October 4, 2026
Taiki and Chinatsu begin their outing at a sports shop, and Taiki is ecstatic at its casual nature. They head to a cafe to encounter Kazuma Matsuoka, a popular student and basketball player who has returned from America, unexpectedly joining them to Taiki's annoyance. Matsuoka sharply remarks to Taiki privately that he has no place to pursue romance with his lackluster badminton skills. Taiki encourages Chinatsu to join Matsuoka in watching a college basketball game and gain experience, only for her to rejoin him later on having changed her mind. They watch the sunset at a rooftop deck, where Chinatsu points out the similarities of the outing to their first meeting. Chinatsu opens up on already seeing Taiki as a hardworking person before they met, surprising him. Taiki attempts to confess when they are confronted by Chinatsu's former teammate Yumeka Kido, who mocks Chinatsu on giving up basketball and the nationals to pursue romance with Taiki.
27	2	"Admiration"; Transliteration: "Akogare" (Japanese: 憧れ)	Yasuro Tsuchiya	Yūichirō Yano	Miho Tanino & Nana Mori	October 11, 2026
After Yumeka leaves, Taiki recalls seeing her play with the basketball team in middle school. He assures Chinatsu of being able to reach the nationals. The sports clubs train for their upcoming matches, which includes Christmas training. Taiki learns from Haryū that Chinatsu holds a deep admiration for Yumeka, who was formerly her longtime friend. He runs into Yumeka again at a dental clinic and senses their friction. Yumeka plainly admits she hates Chinatsu and became bored with basketball, leaving him to wonder on their strained friendship. Taiki asks Chinatsu during an evening walk on her past with Yumeka. Chinatsu recounts how she aspired to reach Yumeka's level in elementary. Yumeka tutored her into improving her form, earning the ire of their peers. The two continued to play as a unit upon entering middle school until Yumeka quit, citing her frustrations of Chinatsu overly relying on her. Taiki later sees Yumeka playing basketball, where Yumeka insists there is no value in focusing on sports in the face of constant losses. Taiki retorts she wasted her talent due to her fear of failing, prompting an offended Yumeka to slap him and call out his lack of understanding.
28	3	"They're One and the Same"; Transliteration: "Hitotsu no Koto Da yo" (Japanese: 1つのことだよ)	Nana Harada	Nobuo Tomizawa	Miho Tanino & Nana Mori	October 18, 2026
Yumeka blurts out that Chinatsu should not falter in her practice if she still aims for the nationals, surprising Taiki. He later observes Chinatsu practicing with her team for the Winter Cup as Hina continues avoiding him. During a tense practice session, one of Chinatsu's teammates scolds her out of stress for trying to force them to adapt to her skills. Chinatsu is left reminded of her sacrificing rest for nonstop practice to catch up to Yumeka. She later inquires with Taiki on skipping practice, making Taiki wonder if Chinatsu has ever considered it. Sometime later, Taiki sets his sights on gaining an extra ticket to Chinatsu's Winter Cup game, only for Matsuoka to also express interest. The two boys settle their dispute through a shuttle run, with Matsuoka daring Taiki to give up on pursuing Chinatsu. Meanwhile, Chinatsu runs into Yumeka at the clinic, where Yumeka sullenly reveals she secretly admired Chinatsu's determination for basketball and felt offended seeing her waste her skills by hanging out with Taiki. Although dismayed at losing contact with Yumeka, Chinatsu asserts that Taiki has become her source of strength in reaching and fulfilling her goals.
29	4	"Love is the Most Powerful Feeling"; Transliteration: "Suki wa Saikyō no Kanjō" (Japanese: 好きは最強の感情)	Yūichirō Yano	Daisuke Sakō & Yūichirō Yano	Miho Tanino & Haruki Moriya	October 25, 2026
Chinatsu leaves ahead, causing Yumeka to recall losing her love for basketball after overtraining herself to compensate for her fading strength and witnessing her parents divorce. Yumeka began to hide her resentment from Chinatsu and tearfully observed Chinatsu working hard, concluding that her efforts led to more suffering. Yumeka encounters Taiki again, who had won the bet for the Winter Cup ticket against Matsuoka. He offers the ticket to Yumeka, explaining that having an important person to Chinatsu's growth cheer her on would motivate her. Matsuoka also reevaluates Taiki's determination upon hearing his intent to give the ticket to Yumeka. Chinatsu offers to become a close confidant to Taiki during hard times, leaving him warmed. On Christmas Eve, Taiki declines Hina's invitation to a hangout and bids good luck to Chinatsu's team. Meanwhile, Yumeka is encouraged by her boyfriend to not let outside forces hinder her love for basketball and watch Chinatsu's Winter Cup game.
30	5	"It's Back"; Transliteration: "Modotte Kita yo" (Japanese: 戻ってきたよ)	Yūichirō Yano	Yūichirō Yano	Miho Tanino, Haruki Moriya & Nana Mori	November 8, 2026
Yumeka heads to the stadium just as Chinatsu's game begins. Upon seeing the improvement of Chinatsu and her team, Yumeka gradually regains her love for the sport. Meanwhile, Taiki assists Hina in setting up the school's Christmas decorations, where they muse on Hina's upcoming hangout. Taiki hears of the joys of dating during Christmas Eve, though he remains set on mending Chinatsu and Yumeka's friendship. Back at the Winter Cup, Chinatsu's team is forecasted to lose the game. A nervous Yumeka loudly cheers her on, allowing Chinatsu to narrowly win for the team and advance to the next round. Yumeka congratulates Chinatsu as the two girls emotionally reconcile from their previous regrets. Yumeka promises on playing together again, which Chinatsu excitedly accepts. In its aftermath, Taiki, Chinatsu, and their friends celebrate Christmas Eve in their own ways, though Chinatsu splits from the team to find Taiki at school. She then learns from Taiki's friends of his determination to win the ticket against Matsuoka as part of mending her friendship with Yumeka, surprising her as she encounters Taiki setting up the gym's Christmas tree.
31	6	"Christmas Eve"; Transliteration: "Kurisumasu Ibu" (Japanese: クリスマスイブ)	Hitoshi Motoi	Mamoru Kurosawa	Miho Tanino, Haruki Moriya & Nana Mori	November 15, 2026
Chinatsu thanks Taiki for reconnecting her with Yumeka, voicing deep gratitude towards his efforts. Taiki meekly expresses he returned the favor, causing Chinatsu to hug him to his shock. He is left to wonder on her reasons for the hug when he runs into Yumeka, who shares her intention to join her school's basketball team and catch up to Chinatsu. Yumeka is exasperated to learn that Taiki has not confessed his feelings to Chinatsu, though she tells him to take the risk. Although Chinatsu's team loses the Winter Cup, they remain positive at having significantly improved. Chinatsu later prepares for a trip to Nagano to spend New Year with her family, while Taiki is unable to ask her about the hug. During a deep cleaning of the gym, Chinatsu quietly asks if the hug offended him, though Taiki is unable to reply. Taiki later rushes home to directly tell his answer to Chinatsu, only to learn to his dismay that she has already departed for her family trip.
32	7	"I Need to Tell You Something"; Transliteration: "Hanashitai Koto ga Aru kara" (Japanese: 話したいことがあるから)	Yasuro Tsuchiya	Nobuo Tomizawa	Miho Tanino & Nana Mori	November 22, 2026
Taiki celebrates New Year with his family before joining his friends at a shrine and festival. He then messages Chinatsu during her video call with Karen for them to talk after she returns from her family trip, with Karen taking note of a flustered Chinatsu. After the group splits, Karen voices to Ayame her observation of her assumed crush on Kyo, though Ayame bashfully denies it. Taiki spends the next few days in boredom but grows restless at wanting to tell his feelings to Chinatsu. He reminisces on their close friendship, when he receives a letter from Chinatsu thanking his family for aiding her growth. As this is happening, Chinatsu bonds with her family in Nagano as her grandparents ask about her romantic life. Recalling on seeing Taiki repeatedly visit the gym before they became friends and imagining on spending time with him during the winter, Chinatsu realizes her own burgeoning feelings for him upon learning how her grandparents became a couple through mutual yearning.
33	8	"January 4"; Transliteration: "Ichigatsu Yokka" (Japanese: 1月4日)	TBA	TBA	TBA	November 29, 2026

== Home media release ==
=== Japanese ===
Toho Animation (Japan – Region 2/A)
Vol.	Episodes	Cover character(s)	Release date	Ref.
Season 1
1	1–4	Taiki Inomata, Chinatsu Kano and Hina Chono	January 22, 2025	
2	5–8	Taiki Inomata and Chinatsu Kano	February 19, 2025	
3	9–12	Taiki Inomata, Chinatsu Kano and Hina Chono	March 19, 2025	
4	13–16	Taiki Inomata and Hina Chono	April 16, 2025	
5	17–20	Chinatsu Kano	May 21, 2025	
6	21–25	Taiki Inomata, Chinatsu Kano, Hina Chono, Kyo Kasahara and Ayame Moriya	June 18, 2025	
Season 2
1	26–29	Chinatsu Kano and Yumeka Kido	January 20, 2027	
2	30–33	TBA	February 17, 2027	
3	34–37	TBA	March 17, 2027	
