= Akira Matsu =

Japanese actress and politician

- 松 あきら
- Official portrait, 2005

Member of the House of Councillors
- In office 7 September 2007 – 28 July 2013
- Preceded by: Yutaka Kobayashi
- Succeeded by: Sayaka Sasaki
- Constituency: Kanagawa at-large
- In office 23 July 1995 – 28 July 2007
- Preceded by: Seat established
- Succeeded by: Hiroe Makiyama
- Constituency: Kanagawa at-large

Personal details
- Born: 3 December 1947 (age 78) Nakahara, Kawasaki, Japan
- Party: Komeito (since 1998)
- Other political affiliations: New Frontier (1994–1998)
- Spouse: Tomoo Nishikawa
- Education: Takarazuka Music School

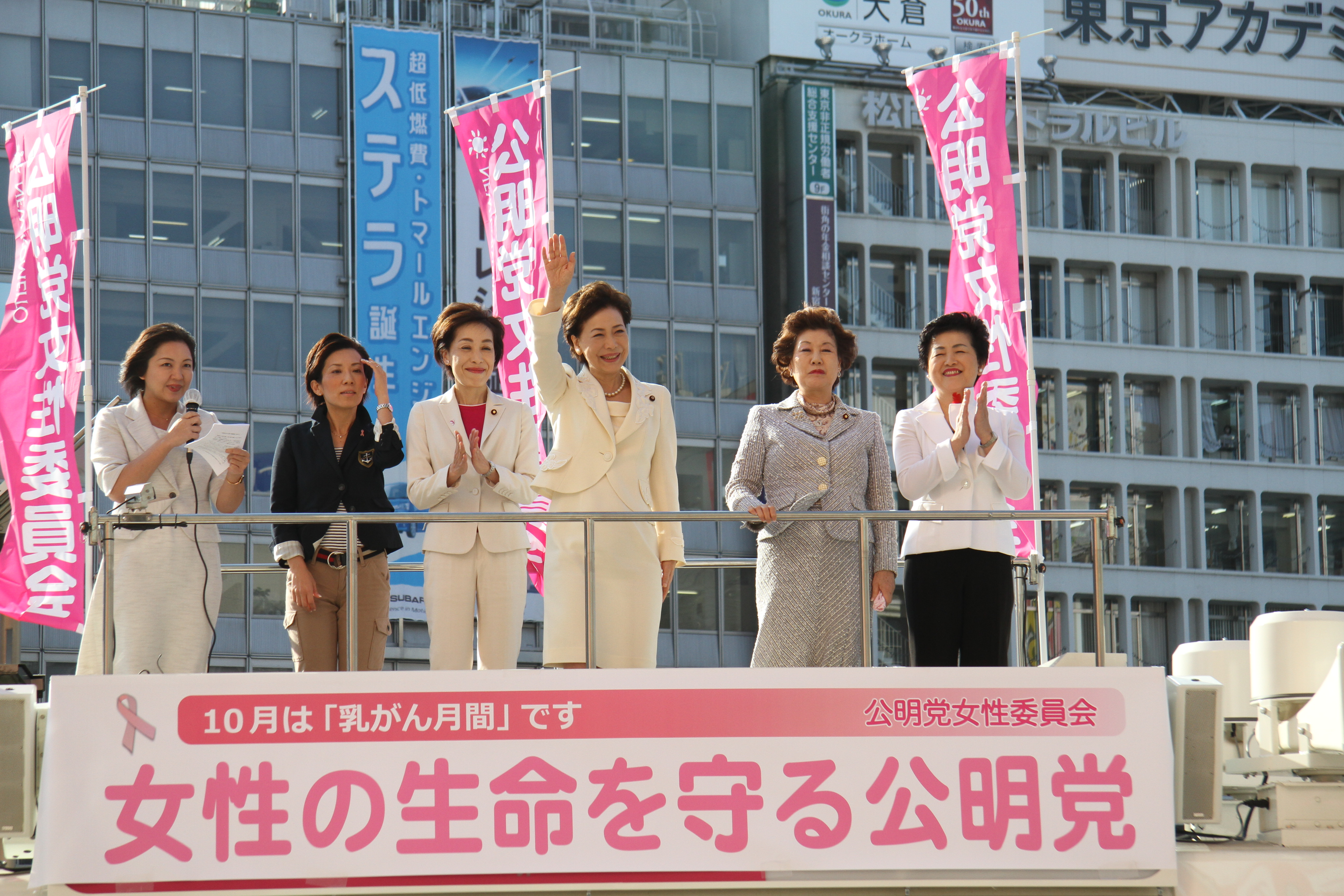
Akira Matsu along with other New Komeito

Akira Matsu (松 あきら, Matsu Akira; born 3 December 1947) is a Japanese politician of the New Komeito Party, a member of the House of Councillors in the Diet (national legislature). A native of Kanagawa Prefecture and former member of Takarazuka Revue, she was elected to the House of Councillors for the first time in 1995 as a candidate for the New Frontier Party. She lost her re-election in July 2007 but in September 2007 took over the seat in the house that was vacated when Yutaka Kobayashi, a member of the house, resigned.

Her husband Tomoo Nishikawa is a lawyer and a former Representative of Japan.

House of Councillors
| Preceded by Tadashi Kobayashi; Kiyoharu Ishiwata | Councillor for Kanagawa's At-large district 1995–2007; 2007– Served alongside: Kiyoharu Ishiwata, Yutaka Kobayashi, Tsuyoshi Saito, Yoriko Kawaguchi, Masashi Mito, Hiroe Makiyama | Incumbent |
