= Yutaka Kobayashi (politician) =

Japanese politician (born 1964)

- 小林 温
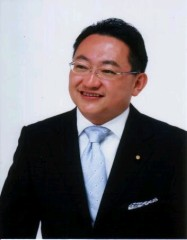
- Kobayashi in 2005

Member of the House of Councillors
- In office 30 July 2001 – 4 September 2007
- Preceded by: Kiyoharu Ishiwata
- Succeeded by: Akira Matsu
- Constituency: Kanagawa at-large

Personal details
- Born: 21 April 1964 (age 62) Inawashiro, Fukushima, Japan
- Party: Liberal Democratic
- Education: Waseda University

Yutaka Kobayshi (小林 温, Kobayashi Yutaka; born April 21, 1964) is a former Japanese politician of the Liberal Democratic party, serving as a member of the House of Councillors in the Diet of Japan.

== Early life ==
Kobayashi was born in Fukushima Prefecture in 1964 and graduated from Waseda University in 1988.

== Political career ==
Kobayashi was elected to the House of Councillors for the first time in 2001 representing Kanagawa at-large. He won his re-election in July 2007 but resigned on 4 September after members of his campaign were arrested for violating election rules regarding paying volunteers.

== Scandal ==
Kobayashi resigned from politics as the result of a scandal where his campaign was found to have violated election financing rules.

House of Councillors
Preceded by Akira Matsu; Kiyoharu Ishiwata; Tsuyoshi Saito	Councillor for Kanagawa's At-large district 2001–2007; 2007–2007; Served alongside: Akira Matsu, Yutaka Kobayashi, Tsuyoshi Saito, Yoriko Kawaguchi, Masashi Mito, Hiroe Makiyama	Succeeded by Akira Matsu
