= Tomoo =

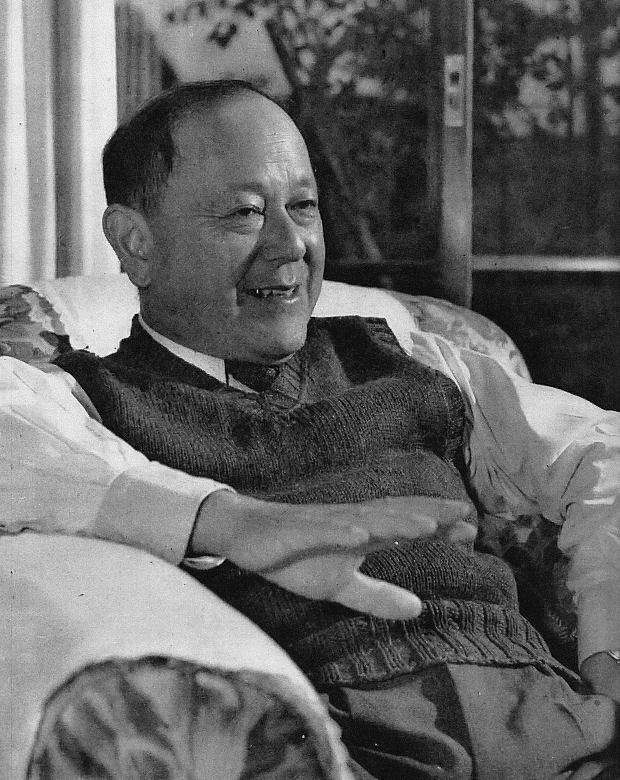
- Tomoo Maki (1891-1968), Japanese political scientist
- Pronunciation: tomoo (IPA)
- Gender: Male

Origin
- Origin: Japanese
- Meaning: Different meanings depending on the kanji used

Tomoo is a masculine Japanese given name.

== Written forms ==
Tomoo can be written using different combinations of kanji characters. Some examples:

- 友雄, "friend, masculine"
- 友男, "friend, man"
- 友夫, "friend, husband"
- 知雄, "know, masculine"
- 知男, "know, man"
- 知夫, "know, husband"
- 智雄, "intellect, masculine"
- 智男, "intellect, man"
- 智夫, "intellect, husband"
- 共雄, "together, masculine"
- 共男, "together, man"
- 朋雄, "companion, masculine"
- 朋男, "companion, man"
- 朝雄, "morning/dynasty, masculine"
- 朝男, "morning/dynasty, man"
- 朝夫, "morning/dynasty, husband"

The name can also be written in hiragana ともお or katakana トモオ.

== Notable people with the name ==
- Tomoo Amino (網野 友雄; born 1980), Japanese basketball player
- Tomoo Ishii (石井 朝夫; 1923–2022), Japanese golfer
- Tomoo Kudaka (久高 友雄; 1963–1999), Japanese footballer
- Tomoo Maki (槇 智雄; 1891-1968), Japanese political scientist
- Tomoo Nishikawa (西川 知雄; born 1948), Japanese lawyer and politician
- Tomoo Otaguro (太田黒 伴雄; 1836–1876), Japanese rebel
- Tomoo Torii (鳥居 智男; born 1973), Japanese judoka
- Tomoo (singer) (born 1993), Japanese singer
