= List of Blue Box chapters =

Blue Box is a Japanese manga series written and illustrated by Kouji Miura. It was originally a one-shot that was published in Shueisha's shōnen manga magazine Weekly Shōnen Jump on August 3, 2020. It was later serialized in the same magazine from April 12, 2021, to July 13, 2026. Shueisha has collected its chapters into individual tankōbon volumes. The first volume was released on August 4, 2021. As of October 2, 2026, 27 volumes have been released.

Blue Box has been licensed for simultaneous publication in North America as it is released in Japan, with its chapters being digitally launched by Viz Media on its Shonen Jump website. Shueisha also simulpublishes the series in English for free on the Manga Plus app and website. In February 2022, Viz Media announced that they had licensed the series in print format; the first volume was released on November 1 of the same year. The manga is also licensed in Indonesia by Elex Media Komputindo.

== Volumes ==
No.	Original release date	Original ISBN	English release date	English ISBN
1	August 4, 2021	978-4-08-882731-5	November 1, 2022	978-1-9747-3462-7
1. "Chinatsu Senpai" (千夏先輩); 2. "You Have to Go to Nationals" (インターハイ行ってください, Intāhai Itte Kudasai); 3. "Pretending to Be a Stranger" (他人のフリ, Tanin no Furi); 4. "Chosen One" (選ばれし者, Erabareshi Mono); 5. "What I Call Her" (呼び方, Yobikata); 6. "At Least One Step" (一歩でも, Ippo de mo); 7. "You'll Be Fine" (大丈夫, Daijōbu)
2	October 4, 2021	978-4-08-882794-0	January 3, 2023	978-1-9747-3611-9
8. "Doubles" (ダブルス, Daburusu); 9. "Gym Uniforms" (ジャージ, Jāji); 10. "The Day Before" (前日, Zenjitsu); 11. "Regional Preliminaries" (地区予選, Chiku Yosen); 12. "If He Wins" (あいつが勝ったら, Aitsu ga Kattara); 13. "Date" (デート, Dēto); 14. "Aquarium" (水族館, Suizokukan); 15. "An Ordinary Girl" (普通の女子, Futsū no Joshi); 16. "Kindred Spirits" (同志, Dōshi)
3	January 4, 2022	978-4-08-883007-0	March 7, 2023	978-1-9747-3626-3
17. "No Problems" (問題ないです, Mondai Nai Desu); 18. "Wish Me Luck" (がんばれって言って, Ganbare tte Itte); 19. "I'll Carry Your Bags" (荷物お運びします, Nimotsu o Hakobi Shimasu); 20. "Eavesdropping" (盗み聞き, Nusumigiki); 21. "Can I Have One?" (一つちょうだい？, Hitotsu Chōdai?); 22. "Score!" (一本っ！, Ippon!); 23. "I'll Definitely Get It In!" (絶対入れる！, Zettai Ireru!); 24. "That's Just Sports" (それがスポーツだろ, Sore ga Supōtsu Daro); 25. "Good Job" (お疲れ様, Otsukaresama)
4	March 4, 2022	978-4-08-883063-6	May 2, 2023	978-1-9747-3641-6
26. "I'll Be Rooting For You" (応援するよ, Ōen Suru yo); 27. "A Chance" (脈アリ, Myaku Ari); 28. "Your Own House" (自分の家, Jibun no Ie); 29. "It's Not a Good Thing" (良くないこと, Yoku Nai Koto); 30. "Getting Closer" (お近づきに, Ochikazuki ni); 31. "Is It a Date?" (おデートでしょうか, O-Dēto Deshō ka); 32. "Uncool!" (ダサいぞ！！, Dasai zo!!); 33. "When the Underdog Wins" (大穴が勝ちをさらう展開, Ōana ga Kachi o Sarau Tenkai); 34. "Girls..." (女の子って, Onna no Ko tte)
5	June 3, 2022	978-4-08-883149-7	July 4, 2023	978-1-9747-3741-3
35. "Something Interesting" (おもしろいもの, Omoshiroi Mono); 36. "Better Get Going" (行かないと, Ikanai to); 37. "Helloooo" (もしもーし, Moshi Mōshi); 38. "A Flirt" (人たらし, Hitotarashi); 39. "Testing it Out" (実験中, Jikken-chū); 40. "The One Who's Cool..." (かっこいいのは, Kakkoii no wa); 41. "I Want a Back-and-Forth Rally" (ラリーしたいです, Rarī Shitai Desu); 42. "An Impossible Notion" (無理なお話, Muri na Ohanashi); 43. "What's the Connection?" (どういう文脈？, Dō Iu Bunmyaku?)
6	August 4, 2022	978-4-08-883192-3	September 5, 2023	978-1-9747-4037-6
44. "It Didn't Come True" (叶ってないよ, Kanattenai yo); 45. "August 26" (8月26日, Hachigatsu Nijūrokunichi); 46. "August 26, Part 2" (8月26日②, Hachigatsu Nijūrokunichi 2); 47. "August 26, Part 3" (8月26日③, Hachigatsu Nijūrokunichi 3); 48. "If We Weren't a Year Apart" (1年違えば, Ichinen Chigaeba); 49. "At Morning Practice Again" (また朝練で, Mata Asaren de); 50. "Unfair Woman" (ずるい女, Zurui Onna); 51. "This is Just Right" (このくらいが丁度いい, Kono Kurai ga Chōdo Ii); 52. "Of Course I Want to See It" (見たいでしょ, Mitai Desho)
7	October 4, 2022	978-4-08-883259-3	November 7, 2023	978-1-9747-4072-7
53. "Doing Great" (良くやってるよ, Yoku Yatteru yo); 54. "Hydration" (水分補給, Suibun Hokyū); 55. "Inomata" (イノマタ君, Inomata-kun); 56. "Who Do I Think I Am?" (何様だよ, Nanisama da yo); 57. "I Know" (私は知ってる, Watashi wa Shitteru); 58. "Right or Left?" (右と左, Migi to Hidari); 59. "We Didn't!" (してないですよ, Shitenai Desu yo); 60. "Let's Go See It" (観に行こうよ, Mi ni Ikō yo); 61. "I've Got Plans" (予定あるんだ, Yotei Aru n Da)
8	December 2, 2022	978-4-08-883389-7	January 2, 2024	978-1-9747-4280-6
62. "What'd You Say?" (なんて言いました？, Nante Iimashita?); 63. "Help Me Out!" (力を貸してよ！, Chikara o Kashite yo!); 64. "As One of Her Closest Friends" (親友として, Shinyū to Shite); 65. "It's Not That" (そこじゃない, Soko ja Nai); 66. "I'm Here to Lend an Ear" (話なら聞くぞ, Hanashi nara Kiku zo); 67. "A Chance to Blossom" (花が咲くまで, Hana ga Saku made); 68. "Girl Manager" (女子マネージャー, Joshi Manējā); 69. "Inota!" (いのた！); 70. "An Exciting Event" (ワクワクイベント, Wakuwaku Ibento)
9	February 3, 2023	978-4-08-883433-7	March 5, 2024	978-1-9747-4316-2
71. "Joint Training Camp" (合同合宿, Gōdō Gasshuku); 72. "Spinning" (ぐるぐる, Guruguru); 73. "That's What I Know" (俺はわかってる, Ore wa Wakatteru); 74. "I Don't Need an Answer" (いらないの, Iranai no); 75. "A Roller Coaster" (ジェットコースター, Jetto Kōsutā); 76. "Didn't Mean to Say" (言うつもり, Iu Tsumori); 77. "Even So" (それでも, Sore de mo); 78. "You Are Too" (お前もだろ, Omae mo Daro); 79. "Shopping for a Tracksuit" (ジャージ買いに, Jāji Kai ni); 80. "Because That's Who I Am" (それが私なので, Sore ga Watashi na no de)
10	May 2, 2023	978-4-08-883539-6	May 7, 2024	978-1-9747-4595-1
81. "I Was Hoping You Could Try It" (食べてほしくて, Tabete Hoshikute); 82. "Where It Hurts" (痛いところ, Itai Tokoro); 83. "Déjà Vu" (デジャブ, Dejabu); 84. "How That Made Her Feel" (どんな気持ち, Don'na Kimochi); 85. "Because I Hate Her" (キライだから, Kirai Da kara); 86. "Admiration" (憧れ, Akogare); 87. "Excuses and Sound Arguments" (言い訳と正論, Iiwake to Seiron); 88. "Can't Stay Like This" (このままじゃダメだよ, Kono Mama ja Dame Da yo); 89. "Yumeka, You..." (夢佳って, Yumeka tte); 90. "They're One and the Same" (1つのことだよ, Hitotsu no Koto Da yo)
11	August 4, 2023	978-4-08-883591-4	July 2, 2024	978-1-9747-4596-8
91. "The Most Powerful Feeling" (最強の感情, Saikyō no Kanjō); 92. "Whenever You're Struggling" (つらい時には, Tsurai Toki ni wa); 93. "To Strip Away" (剥ぎ取っていかないと, Hagitotte Ikanai to); 94. "Has It Been Two Years?" (2年か？, Ni-nen ka?); 95. "It's Back" (戻ってきたよ, Modotte Kita yo); 96. "Christmas Eve" (クリスマスイブ, Kurisumasu Ibu); 97. "Are You Having Problems?" (おかしくなった?, Okashiku Natta?); 98. "The End of the Year" (年の瀬, Toshi no Se); 99. "Don't Hesitate" (ためらうな, Tamerau-na)
12	October 4, 2023	978-4-08-883690-4	October 1, 2024	978-1-9747-4871-6
100. "I Wanna See Her" (会いたいな, Aitai na); 101. "Today Too" (今日も, Kyō mo); 102. "It's So Beautiful" (キレイでしょ, Kirei Desho); 103. "I Need to Tell You Something" (話したいことがあるから, Hanashitai Koto ga Aru kara); 104. "January 4" (1月4日, Ichigatsu Yokka); 105. "Let's Keep It a Secret" (秘密にしよう, Himitsu ni Shiyō); 106. "So Nervous" (緊張してて, Kinchō Shitete); 107. "Your Style of Love, Chii" (ちーらしい恋, Chiirashii Koi); 108. "It's Already Settled" (決着ついたでしょ, Ketchaku Tsuita Desho)
13	December 4, 2023	978-4-08-883790-1	December 3, 2024	978-1-9747-4921-8
109. "January 15" (1月15日, Ichigatsu Jūgonichi); 110. "Interview" (インタビュー, Intabyū); 111. "Reward" (ご褒美, Go Hōbi); 112. "Gotten It All Sorted Out" (整理できたんだ, Seiri Dekita n Da); 113. "A Waste" (勿体なくて, Mottainakute); 114. "Challenger" (挑戦者, Chōsensha); 115. "Lucky" (ラッキー, Rakkī); 116. "It's Rude" (失礼でしょう, Shitsurei Deshou); 117. "A Big Step" (大一歩, Dai Ippo)
14	March 4, 2024	978-4-08-883848-9	March 4, 2025	978-1-9747-5177-8
118. "That Kind of Person" (そういう人, Sō Iu Hito); 119. "Almost Got the Wrong Idea" (勘違いするところだった, Kanchigai Suru Tokoro Datta); 120. "Outrageous" (とんでもないのが, Tondemonai no ga); 121. "Good Luck, Senpai" (がんばれ先輩, Ganbare Senpai); 122. "Show Off Your Skills" (腕の見せ所, Ude no Misedokoro); 123. "Difference Between Grades" (学年差なんて, Gakunensa nante); 124. "Great to Hear" (喜ばしいこと, Yorokobashii Koto); 125. "You Know What That Means" (そういうこと, Sō Iu Koto); 126. "Take Our Time" (俺達のタイミングで, Oretachi no Taimingu de)
15	June 4, 2024	978-4-08-884041-3	May 6, 2025	978-1-9747-5489-2
127. "Gives Me Goosebumps" (震えるね, Furueru ne); 128. "With Hyodo" (兵藤さんと, Hyōdō-san to); 129. "With the Right Effort" (正しい努力で, Tadashii Doryoku de); 130. "I'm Borrowing One" (拝借します, Haishaku Shimasu); 131. "That Can't Be True" (そんなことないですよね, Sonna Koto Nai Desu yo ne); 132. "I Get That" (わかってるよ, Wakatteru yo); 133. "Why?" (なんで⋯？, Nan de...?); 134. "Get On" (乗ってください, Notte Kudasai); 135. "That's Not True" (そんなことないです, Sonna Koto Nai Desu)
16	August 2, 2024	978-4-08-884133-5	July 1, 2025	978-1-9747-5537-0
136. "Go Eimei!" (ファイト栄明, Faito Eimei); 137. "The Guy Who Carried Her" (おんぶの人, Onbu no Hito); 138. "A Badminton Day" (バドミントンの日, Badominton no Hi); 139. "I've Done My Fair Share" (やってきたこと, Yatte Kita Koto); 140. "A Senpai's Love" (先輩としての想い, Senpai to Shite no Omoi); 141. "You Can Do It!" (がんばれっ, Ganbare); 142. "Final Game" (ファイナルゲーム, Fainaru Gēmu); 143. "Forehead Flick" (デコピン, Dekopin); 144. "Let's Replace It" (上書きしよっか, Uwagaki Shiyokka)
17	October 4, 2024	978-4-08-884207-3	September 2, 2025	978-1-9747-5490-8
145. "She Really Is Tough" (やっぱり強ぇ, Yappari Tsuē); 146. "The Feeling's Mutual" (お互いさまです, Otagai-sama Desu); 147. "Secret Someone" (ひみつのお相手, Himitsu no O-Aite); 148. "If We Hadn't Broken Up" (別れてなきゃ, Wakaretenakya); 149. "Deck of Kindness" (優しさの手札, Yasashisa no Tefuda); 150. "Last Fireworks" (最後の花火, Saigo no Hanabi); 151. "Hello" (「こんにちは」, Kon'nichi wa); 152. "Because It's So Precious" (大切だからこそ, Taisetsu Da kara koso); 153. "Don't Eat Ice Cream" (アイスを食べない, Aisu o Tabenai)
18	December 4, 2024	978-4-08-884383-4	November 4, 2025	978-1-9747-5881-4
154. "Into That Box" (あの箱には, Ano Hako ni wa); 155. "Could It Be" (もしかして, Moshi ka Shite); 156. "Winning" (勝つことが, Katsu Koto ga); 157. "The Beach in Summer" (夏の海, Natsu no Umi); 158. "Ten Challenges" (10本勝負, Juppon Shōbu); 159. "Guest of Honor" (今日の主役, Kyō no Shuyaku); 160. "A Wish" (願い事, Negaigoto); 161. "Thanks for Taking Care of Us" (楽しめよ, Tanoshime yo); 162. "It Might Work Out" (いいかも, Ii ka mo)
19	March 4, 2025	978-4-08-884410-7	February 3, 2026	978-1-9747-6155-5
163. "Show Up When Someone's in Trouble" (誰かのピンチに現れる, Dare-ka no Pinchi ni Arawareru); 164. "Socially Awkward" (不器用だよ, Bukiyō Da yo); 165. "The Haunted House" (お化け屋敷, Obake Yashiki); 166. "This Feeling Is" (この気持ちは, Kono Kimochi wa); 167. "If It's Not Too Late" (まだ間に合うなら, Mada Ma ni Au nara); 168. "This Is Who I Am" (これが私だ, Kore ga Watashi da); 169. "Your Stamp" (スタンプ, Sutanpu); 170. "A Year Since Then" (あれから一年, Are kara Ichi-nen); 171. "Are You Over Him?" (諦めついた?, Akirametsuita?)
20	May 2, 2025	978-4-08-884510-4	May 5, 2026	978-1-9747-6571-3
172. "What's in Front of You Right Now" (目の前の"今", Me no Mae no Ima"); 173. "Let Me Carry That Weight" (持たせてください, Motasete Kudasai); 174. "Only Basketball" (バスケだけ, Basuke dake); 175. "A Child" (子供なんだ, Kodomo na n Da); 176. "I Want to Be in a Relationship" (恋人でいたい, Koibito de Itai); 177. "It's Been Essential" (欠かせなかった, Kakasenakatta); 178. "Thanks" (ありがとね, Arigato ne); 179. "Seeing Things" (幻, Maboroshi); 180. "Rewards" (報わせてあげるんだ, Mukuwasete Ageru n Da)
21	July 4, 2025	978-4-08-884564-7	August 4, 2026	978-1-9747-1644-9
181. "Not Gonna Miss" (もう外さない, Mō Hazusanai); 182. "So Much Fun, I Could Cry" (泣きそうなほど楽しいんだ, Naki-sō na hodo Tanoshii n Da); 183. "Let's Play Basketball" (バスケしよう, Basuke Shiyō); 184. "You're Parent Approved" (親公認だね, Oyakōnin Da ne); 185. "A Problem" (マズイのではないのでしょうか？, Mazui no de wa Nai no deshou ka?); 186. "I Hope He Doesn't Feel Lonely" (寂しくないといいな, Sabishiku Nai to Ii na); 187. "Stay Close to Her" (そばにいてあげてね, Soba ni Ite Agete ne); 188. "When You're Lonely" (正しい選択, Tadashii Sentaku); 189. "To a Good Game" (お願いします, Onegai Shimasu)
22	October 3, 2025	978-4-08-884693-4	November 3, 2026	978-1-9747-6839-4
190. "No Such Thing as Fate" (運命なんて, Unmei Nante); 191. "It's Your Turn" (お前の番だ, Omae no Banda); 192. "I'm Indebted to You" (お世話になりました, Osewa ni Narimashita); 193. "New Year" (あけまして, Akemashite); 194. "Pure Happiness" (幸せの正面に, Shiawase no Shōmen ni); 195. "Stay Right Here" (ここにいよ, Kokoniyo); 196. "I Love You" (好き, Suki); 197. "Take It Slow" (徐々に, Jojoni); 198. "You Have to Attack" (攻めないと, Semenaito)
23	December 4, 2025	978-4-08-884817-4	February 2, 2027	978-1-9747-6945-2
199. "Show Some Understanding" (寄り添って, Yorisotte); 200. "I Wanna Get Closer" (近づけたらいいな, Chikadzuketara ī na); 201. "Preciously" (大切に, Taisetsu ni); 202. "Just As I Am" (私のまま, Watashi no Mama); 203. "Jigsaw Puzzle" (ジグソーパズル, Jigusō Pazuru); 204. "The Possibilities" (可能性に, Kanōsei ni); 205. "What're You Doing?" (何してんだよ, Nani Shite nda yo); 206. "Nothing Yet" (まだないよ, Madana Iyo); 207. "Welcome Home" (おかえり, Okaeri)
24	February 4, 2026	978-4-08-884833-4	—	—
208. "Became Memories" (思い出に, Omoide ni); 209. "My Treasure" (私の宝物, Watashi no Takaramono); 210. "All in Here" (すべて詰まってる, Subete Tsumatteru); 211. "The Final Year" (最後の1年, Saigo no Ichi-nen); 212. "New Challenges to Face" (これからの課題, Korekara no Kadai); 213. "The Final Burden" (最後の重荷, Saigo no Omoni); 214. "Do Your Best" (頑張んなさい, Ganban Nasai); 215. "That's Youth for Ya" (青春だねぇ, Seishun da nē); 216. "I'm Gonna Win" (俺 勝つよ, Ore katsu yo)
25	May 1, 2026	978-4-08-885035-1	—	—
217. "Wanna Take a Detour?" (寄り道しない?, Yorimichi Shinai?); 218. "A Place of Memories" (思い出の場所, Omoide no Basho); 219. "I've Got Someone on My Side" (味方がいる, Mikata ga Iru); 220. "I'm Going to Nationals" (インターハイ行きます, Intāhai Ikimasu); 221. "I'll See you When You're Done" (いってらっしゃい, Itte Rasshai); 222. "I'm Definitely Gonna Win!" (絶対勝つから!, Zettai Katsukara!); 223. "First Page of an Adventure" (冒険の1ページ, Bōken no Ichi Pēji); 224. "Best Friends" (親友, Shin'yū); 225. "It's Precious" (尊いものだよ, Tōtoi Monoda yo)
26	July 3, 2026	978-4-08-885092-4	—	—
226. "That Was So Much Fun!" (楽しかった!, Tanoshikatta!); 227. "Change" (変化, Henka); 228. "Going Forward" (これからまた, Korekara Mata); 229. "Amusement Park Date!!!" (遊園地デート!!!, Yuenchi Dēto!!!); 230. "In Sickness and in Health" (病める時も 健やかなる時も, Yameru Toki mo Sukoyaka naru Toki mo); 231. "Happiest I've Ever Been" (人生で一番幸せだ, Jinsei de Ichiban Shiawase da); 232. "A Natural Challenger" (生粋の挑戦者, Kissui no Chōsensha); 233. "It's On!" (やってやろうじゃねーか, Yatte Yarou ja ne ka); 234. "You're in the Thick of It" (渦中にいるから, Kachū ni Irukara)
27	October 2, 2026	978-4-08-885198-3	—	—
235. "The Same Box" (同じ〝ハコ〟, Onaji "Hako"); 236. "Blue Box" (アオのハコ, Ao no Hako); 237. "Guys with Talent" (才能のあるやつは, Sainō no aru Yatsu wa); 238. "Being Like This" (こんな自分も, Kon'na Jibun mo); 239. "Ally" (仲間, Nakama); 240. "Because I Came to Eimei" (栄明に来たからだ, Eimei ni Kita Kara da); 241. "Love All, Play!" (ラヴオールプレイ, Ravu Ōru Purei); 242. "What Makes Badminton So Fun" (バドミントンの楽しさだよ, Badominton no Tanoshisa da yo); 243. "Effort" (努力, Doryoku)
28	December 4, 2026	978-4-08-885376-5	—	—

== Chapters not yet in tankōbon format ==
These chapters have yet to be published in a tankōbon volume.

244. "Because She's Trying Her Hardest" (頑張っているから, Ganbatte iru Kara)
245. "All-Out Effort" (懸命, Kenmei)
246. "The Winner Is..." (マッチ ワンバイ, Matchi Wan Bai)
247. "Let's Eat Together" (一緒に食べよう, Issho ni Tabeyō)
248. "No Matter How Much Our Worlds Expand" (どんなに世界が広がっても, Don'nani Sekai ga Hirogattemo)
249. "We See Each Other Every Morning" (毎朝会えてるね, Maiasa Aeteru ne)
250. "In This Box" (このハコに, Kono Hako ni)
