= Hiroe Makiyama =

Japanese politician

- 牧山 弘恵
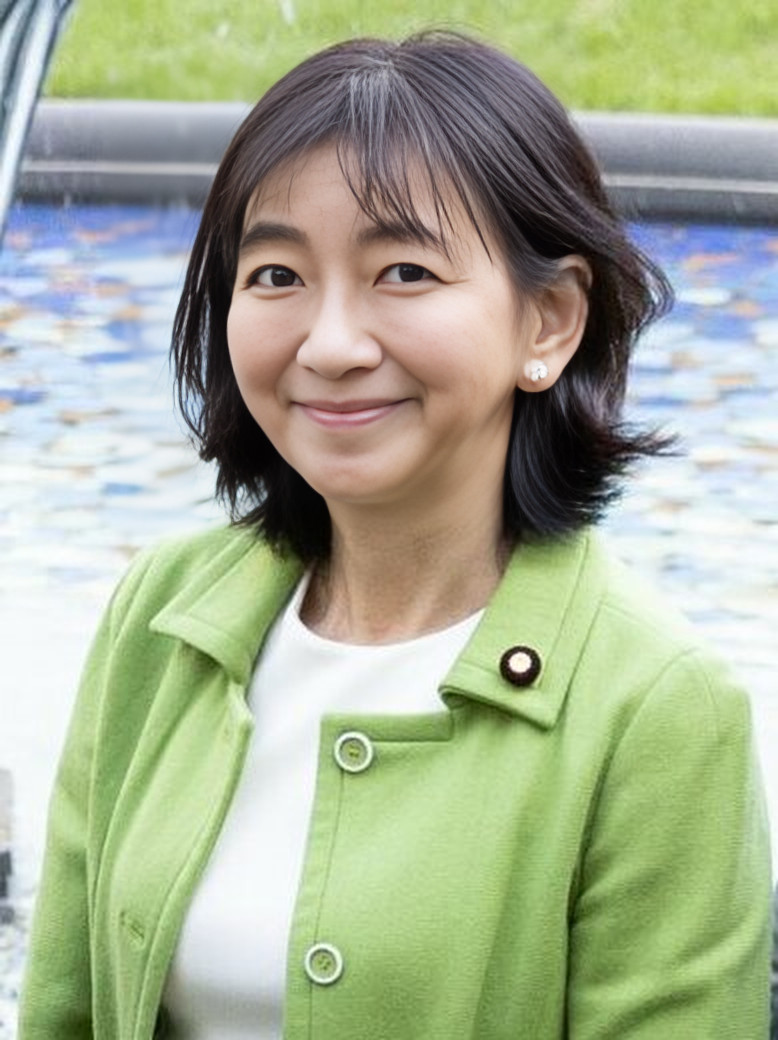
- Makiyama in 2023

Member of the House of Councillors
- Incumbent
- Assumed office 29 July 2007
- Preceded by: Akira Matsu
- Constituency: Kanagawa at-large

Personal details
- Born: 29 September 1964 (age 62) Shinjuku, Tokyo, Japan
- Party: CDP (since 2018)
- Other political affiliations: DPJ (2005–2016); DP (2016–2018)
- Education: International Christian University; Thomas M. Cooley Law School
- Website: Official website

Hiroe Makiyama (牧山 弘恵, Makiyama Hiroe; born 29 September 1964) is a Japanese politician of the Constitutional Democratic Party and a member of the House of Councillors in the Diet (national legislature) representing the Kanagawa at-large district. Makiyama is part of the CDP's shadow cabinet 'Next Cabinet' as the shadow Minister of Justice.

== Early life ==
Makiyama graduated from International Christian University in 1987 and briefly worked for the Tokyo Broadcasting System before moving to the United States to attend the Thomas M. Cooley Law School. She was admitted to the bar in New York and Connecticut and practiced at the New York law firm of Marks & Murase (later Bingham Dana).

== Political career ==
Makiyama entered politics by running in the 2005 general election for the House of Representatives, in which she was defeated by former foreign minister Yoriko Kawaguchi. She was elected for the first time in the 2007 House of Councillors election. When the Democratic Party merged with the Party of Hope in May 2018 to form the Democratic Party for the People, Makiyama did not join the new party and decided to join the CDP instead.

House of Councillors
Preceded by Yutaka Kobayashi; Akira Matsu; Yoriko Kawaguchi	Councillor for Kanagawa at-large district 29 July 2007– Served alongside: Yutaka Kobayashi, Masashi Mito, Akira Matsu	Incumbent
