= Anderson Mōri & Tomotsune =

Japanese law firm

Anderson Mōri & Tomotsune アンダーソン・毛利・友常法律事務所
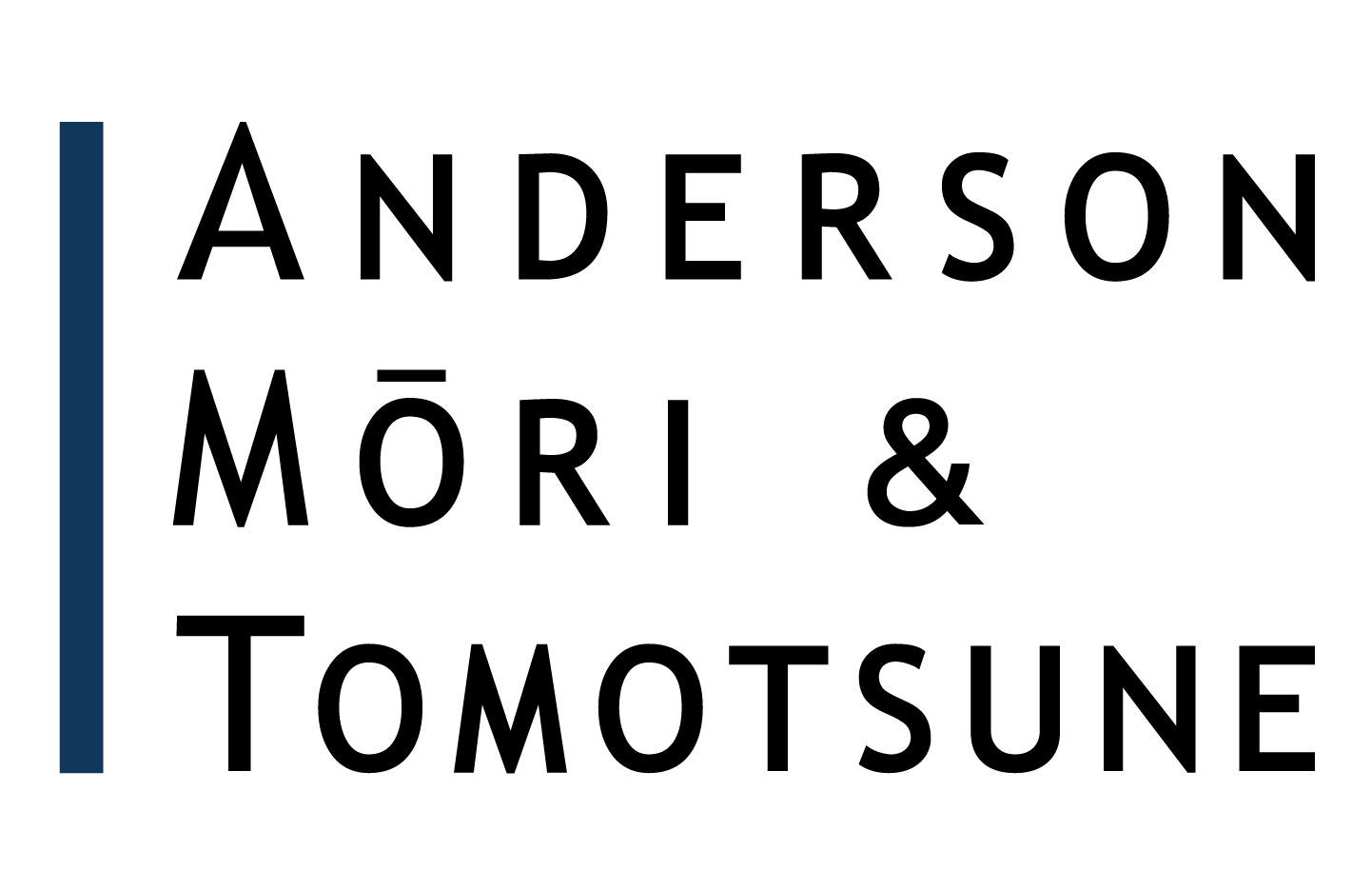
- No. of offices: 11
- No. of attorneys: 700+ (Mar. 2026)
- Major practice areas: General practice
- Date founded: July 8, 1952
- Founder: James Buell Anderson
- Company type: Partnership under Japanese law
- Website: Anderson Mōri & Tomotsune

Anderson Mōri & Tomotsune (アンダーソン・毛利・友常法律事務所, Andāson Mōri Tomotsune Hōritsu Jimusho) is one of the "Big Four" law firms in Japan.

The firm was founded on July 8, 1952, as O'Gorman, Nattier & Anderson after its three initial partners who were all American attorneys. The firm merged with Shenoh & Mōri in 1961 to form Anderson, Nattier, Mōri & Rabinowitz, which was renamed to Anderson Mōri & Rabinowitz in 1963. The firm changed its name to Anderson & Mōri in 1991 following the departure of partner Richard Rabinowitz, who joined several other Anderson Mori attorneys to form the firm of Tōzai Sōgō in 1994. The firm adopted its present name after merging with Tomotsune & Kimura in 2005; Tomotsune & Kimura was itself an offshoot of the law firm founded by Toshiro Nishimura in 1967, which would eventually become Nishimura & Asahi.

Following the collapse of Bingham McCutchen in 2014, 50 of the 60 lawyers at Bingham's Tokyo office joined Anderson Mori in 2015, with the remainder joining the Tokyo office of Morgan, Lewis & Bockius.

Anderson operates as a two-tiered partnership, under which associates become non-equity "junior partners" in their 10th to 12th year of practice, but only become equity-holding senior partners at a later stage (if ever).

The firm joined Ius Laboris in 2014.

== Offices ==
Anderson Mori's main office is in Otemachi Park Building, Otemachi, Chiyoda-ku, Tokyo.

Its first overseas office was in Beijing, opened in 1998. As of 2026, the firm has two domestic branch offices in Osaka and Nagoya, and five overseas offices in Beijing, Shanghai, Singapore, Hanoi, Ho Chi Minh City, Bangkok, London and Brussels. It also has associated firms in Hong Kong, Jakarta and Kuala Lumpur. The firm's Asian offices focus on supporting Japanese clients abroad.

== Notable people ==
- Kunio Hamada, former Supreme Court justice, founding partner of one of the forerunner firms of Mori Hamada & Matsumoto
- Katsuhito Yokokume, member of the House of Representatives, worked as an Anderson Mori associate from 2007 to 2008
- Yasumasa Nagamine, former justice of the Supreme Court of Japan in 2021 and director-general of the International Legal Affairs Bureau
