= Big Four (law firms) =

The Big Four law firms (四大法律事務所, yondai hōritsu jimusho) or the Big Four (四大, yondai) is a term informally used in Japan to refer to those firms which, collectively, are perceived to be the largest firms headquartered in Japan and distinguished in comparison to their other competitors. The Big Four firms are:

- Anderson Mōri & Tomotsune
- Mori Hamada & Matsumoto
- Nagashima Ohno & Tsunematsu
- Nishimura & Asahi

Nowadays, the term "Big Five" is sometimes used to include the fifth-largest firm in Japan by number of lawyers, TMI Associates.

These are the leading law firms practicing corporate law and are considered to be the top tier of the legal industry in Japan.

== "International firm" ==
In Japanese, the term "international firm" (渉外法律事務所, shōgai hōritsu jimusho) is used to refer to the Big Four firms and other Japanese law firms that specialize in international business matters. During the years immediately following World War II, several American lawyers established such firms in Japan (e.g. Anderson Mori). Japanese lawyers with international training began establishing international firms in the 1960s, and since regulatory changes in the 1990s, many Japanese lawyers have joined or partnered with Tokyo offices of major multinational law firms.

Other Japanese firms historically grouped in the "international firm" category include:

- Mitsui, Yasuda, Wani & Maeda (dissolved in 2004, with a number of lawyers joining the Tokyo office of Linklaters)
- Tokyo Aoyama Law Offices and Aoki Law Offices (merged in 2001 to form the Japanese arm of Baker McKenzie)

== See also ==
- White shoe firm
- Magic circle law firms
- Red circle law firms
