= Inter-Pacific Bar Association =

The Inter-Pacific Bar Association or IPBA is an international association of business and commercial lawyers, founded in 1991. Its members consist of residents of the Asia-Pacific region, or lawyers with a strong interest in that region. It brings together lawyers from different backgrounds and legal systems and fosters communication and builds stronger ties between these lawyers and thus their countries.

It was founded in April 1991 at an initial conference in Tokyo attended by 500 lawyers. The association has since grown to over 1,200 members from 65 countries and jurisdictions, such as Australia, China, Singapore, India, the United States and Japan.

Through its IPBA Scholars program the Association brings young lawyers and lawyers from developing countries to its annual conferences and thus helps to ensure the continued development of the legal profession in the region.

The IPBA is open to practicing attorneys anywhere in the world interested in the Asia-Pacific region.

== Former presidents ==
- 2019–2020 Francis Xavier, Singapore
- 2018–2019 Perry Pe, The Philippines
- 2017–2018 Denis McNamara, New Zealand
- 2016–2017 Dhinesh Bhaskaran, Malaysia
- 2015–2016 Kwai Huen Wong, Hong Kong
- 2014–2015 William Scott, Canada
- 2013–2014 Young-Moo Shin, Korea
- 2012–2013 Lalit Bhasin, India
- 2011–2012 Shiro Kuniya, Japan
- 2010–2011 Lee Suet-Fern, Singapore
- 2009–2010 Rafael A. Morales, The Philippines
- 2008–2009 Gerold W. Libby, United States
- 2007–2008 Gao Zongze, China
- 2006–2007 James McH. FitzSimons, Australia
- 2005–2006 Felix O. Soebagjo, Indonesia
- 2004–2005 Sang-Kyu Rhi, Korea
- 2003–2004 Ravinder Nath, India
- 2002–2003 Vivien Chan, Hong Kong
- 2001–2002 Nobuo Miyake, Japan
- 2000–2001 John W. Craig, Canada
- 1999–2000 Dej-Udom Krairit, Thailand
- 1998–1999 Susan Glazebrook, New Zealand
- 1997–1998 Cecil Abraham, Malaysia
- 1996–1997 Teodoro D. Regala, The Philippines
- 1995–1996 Carl E. Anduri, Jr., United States
- 1994–1995 Pathmanaban Selvadurai, Singapore
- 1993–1994 Ming-Sheng Lin, Taiwan
- 1992–1993 Richard James Marshall, Switzerland
- 1991–1992 Kunio Hamada, Japan
