= Masashi Mito =

Japanese politician

- 水戸 将史
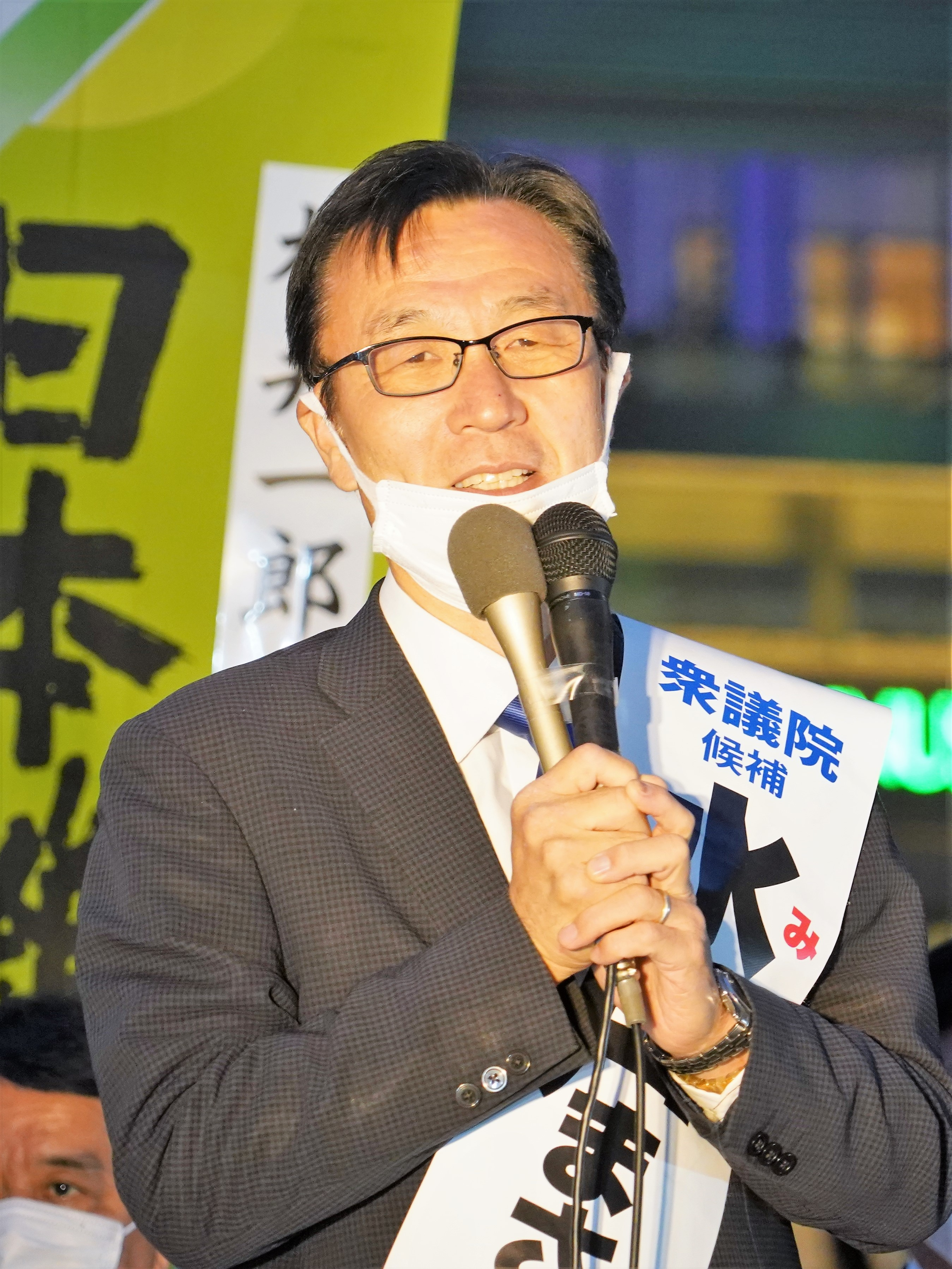
- Mito in 2021

Member of the House of Representatives
- In office 19 December 2014 – 28 September 2017
- Constituency: Southern Kanto PR

Member of the House of Councillors
- In office 29 July 2007 – 28 July 2013
- Preceded by: Yoriko Kawaguchi
- Succeeded by: Dai Shimamura
- Constituency: Kanagawa at-large

Member of the Kanagawa Prefectural Assembly
- In office 1995–2007
- Constituency: Izumi Ward

Personal details
- Born: 28 July 1962 (age 64) Haboro, Hokkaido, Japan
- Party: Innovation (since 2020)
- Other political affiliations: NFP (1994–1998); DPJ (1998–2012); JRP (2012–2014); JIP (2014–2016); DP (2016–2018); Independent (2018–2020)
- Education: Keio University

Masashi Mito (水戸 将史, Mito Masashi; born July 28, 1962) is a former Japanese politician of the Democratic Party of Japan, and a former member of the House of Councillors in the Diet (national legislature). A native of Tomamae District, Hokkaidō and 1985 graduate of Keio University, he was elected to the House of Councillors for the first time in 2007 after serving in the assembly of Kanagawa Prefecture for three terms from 1995 until 2007.

House of Councillors
Preceded by Akira Matsu	Councillor for Kanagawa's At-large district 2007-2013; Served alongside: Hiroe Makiyama, Yutaka Kobayashi, Akira Matsu	Succeeded by Shigefumi Matsuzawa
