= Tomoo Nishikawa =

- 西川 知雄

Member of the House of Representatives
- In office 20 October 1996 – 25 June 2000
- Preceded by: Hachiro Okonogi
- Succeeded by: Hachiro Okonogi
- Constituency: Kanagawa 3rd

Personal details
- Born: 17 December 1948 (age 77) Ōmihachiman, Shiga, Japan
- Party: Independent
- Other political affiliations: New Frontier
- Spouse: Akira Matsu
- Education: University of Tokyo
- Occupation: Attorney

Tomoo Nishikawa (西川 知雄, Nishikawa Tomoo) is a Japanese attorney and former politician, having previously served for one term in the House of Representatives.

== Background ==
Nishikawa graduated from the Faculty of Law at the University of Tokyo and worked at the Ministry of Construction until 1975. Having passed the bar examination in university, he attended the Legal Research and Training Institute from 1975 and was admitted to the bar in 1977.

Following admission, he became a partner at the law firm of Anderson & Mori (now Anderson Mori & Tomotsune) before leaving to co-found the firm of Komatsu, Koma & Nishikawa. While at Anderson, he completed an LLM at Harvard Law School in 1979.

In October 1996, he ran in the Japanese general election for a seat representing the Kanagawa 3rd district as a member of the New Frontier Party, and defeated the LDP incumbent Hachiro Okonogi to win the seat. After the NFP dissolved in 1997, Nishikawa joined the Reform Club party led by Tatsuo Ozawa. He remained a member of this party until his defeat in the June 2000 election, following which he returned to law practice. During this time, Nishikawa was involved in the formation of the Financial Services Agency and the bail-out of the Long-Term Credit Bank of Japan.

In October 2002, Nishikawa's partners elected to join the Asahi Law Offices (a predecessor of Nishimura & Asahi), while Nishikawa established a law firm affiliated with Sidley Austin. He was named as the member of the Executive Committee of Sidley LLP and served until December 2014.

Nishikawa serves as Outside Director of INPEX CORPORATION since March 2020 and as Distinguished University Professor of Josai International University since June 2020.

== Personal life ==
He is married to Komeito politician Akira Matsu.
