= I Love You, My Teacher =

Japanese manga series by Kouji Miura

- First tankōbon volume cover, featuring Ichikawa

先生、好きです。 (Sensei, Suki Desu)
- Genre: Romantic comedy
- Manga
- Written by: Kouji Miura
- Published by: Kodansha
- Imprint: Shōnen Magazine Comics
- Magazine: Weekly Shōnen Magazine (2017–2018); Magazine Pocket (2018)
- Original run: 27 December 2017 – 29 August 2018
- Volumes: 4

I Love You, My Teacher (Japanese: 先生、好きです。, Hepburn: Sensei, Suki Desu) is a Japanese manga series written and illustrated by Kouji Miura. It was serialized in Kodansha's shōnen manga magazine Weekly Shōnen Magazine from December 2017 to June 2018, before moving to the Magazine Pocket website where it ran from June to August of that same year. Its 33 chapters were collected in four tankōbon volumes.

== Plot ==
Yūki Higuchi is a teacher at an all-girls high school, and a bit of a late bloomer when it comes to love. One of his students, Ichikawa, declares her love for him and tries various things to get him to notice her as a woman rather than as a student. Another student, Tamao Watanabe, also pursues his affections.

== Characters ==
Yūki Higuchi (樋口 夕樹, Higuchi Yūki)
The protagonist and the homeroom teacher of the second year Sakura-gumi class. He is also the Japanese language instructor. He has a very serious demeanor and has no romantic experience at the beginning of the story.
Ichikawa (市川)
Voiced by: Kana Hanazawa (2018 PV)
One of the heroines. She is a class representative for the second year Sakura-gumi class. She has a spirited personality and is very friendly. She likes Higuchi and actively tries to get him to see her as a woman rather than just a student.
Tamao Watanabe (渡辺 玉緒)
One of the heroines. She is a class representative for the second year Sakura-gumi class and a member of the astronomy club. She is very formal when talking to classmates. She has excellent grades, but is horrible at cooking. She met Higuchi when she was in junior high, where she started liking him because he said Tamao was a wonderful name.

== Publication ==
Written and illustrated by Kouji Miura, a one-shot chapter of I Love You, My Teacher won a contest on Kodansha's Magazine Pocket web comics site, where it was published on 25 January 2017. The one-shot was later published in Kodansha's shōnen manga magazine Weekly Shōnen Magazine on 24 May of the same year, where it was popular with readers, who called it "cute and erotic". I Love You, My Teacher started its serialization in Weekly Shōnen Magazine on 27 December of the same year, where it ran until 13 June 2018. It was then moved to the Magazine Pocket website, where it ran from 20 June to 29 August of the same year. Kodansha collected its 33 chapters in four tankōbon volumes.

The first volume was released on 16 March 2018; for the release of the volume, the cosplayer Kyouka (of the group Yumemiru Adolescence) appeared at a release party held at the Akihabara location of Karaoke Adores. She dressed as Ichikawa for the event. The last volume was released on 17 October 2018.

=== Volume list ===
No.	Release date	ISBN
1	16 March 2018	978-4-06-510979-3
2	17 May 2018	978-4-06-511411-7
3	17 July 2018	978-4-06-511795-8
4	17 October 2018	978-4-06-512724-7
