= Kunio Hamada =

Japanese judge

Kunio Hamada (濱田 邦夫, Hamada Kunio, born May 24, 1936) is a former member of the Supreme Court of Japan from 2001 until 2006.

Until his appointment to the court, he worked in private practice, initially at Anderson Mori & Rabinowitz and Pillsbury Madison & Sutro. He founded the law firm of Yanagida & Hamada in 1972, his portion of which eventually became part of Mori Hamada & Matsumoto.

In November 2007, he was awarded the Grand Cordon of the Order of the Rising Sun, by the Japanese Government for his public service.
