= Nagashima Ohno & Tsunematsu =

- No. of offices: 7
- No. of attorneys: 543 (June 2013)
- No. of employees: about 950
- Major practice areas: General practice
- Date founded: 2000
- Company type: a partnership under Japanese law and a limited liability partnership under NY law and under Singapore Law
- Website: Official website

Nagashima Ohno & Tsunematsu (長島・大野・常松法律事務所, Nagashima Ōno Tsunematsu Hōritsu Jimusho) is one of the "Big Four" law firms in Japan.

It was founded in 2000 upon the merger of Nagashima & Ohno with Tsunematsu Yanase & Sekine. Nagashima & Ohno was founded in 1961 and was considered to be one of the "Big Four" prior to the merger. Tsunematsu Yanase & Sekine was founded in 1987 by a group of lawyers who left the firm of Blakemore & Mitsuki.

The firm's clients include Bank of Tokyo-Mitsubishi UFJ, Goldman Sachs, GREE, Japan Airlines, JFE Holdings, LaSalle Investment Management, Mizuho Bank, Nomura Holdings, Renault, Sumitomo Mitsui Banking Corporation, Tokyo Electric Power Company, Tokyo Stock Exchange and Yahoo Japan.

NO&T partner Hiroshi Mitoma was voted best corporate lawyer in Japan, and partner Hiroki Inoue was voted best international lawyer in Japan, in a December 2013 Nihon Keizai Shimbun poll of attorneys and corporate legal departments.

NO&T operates as a two-tiered partnership, under which associates become non-equity "junior partners" in their 10th to 12th year of practice, but only become equity-holding senior partners at a later stage (if ever).

== Offices ==
- Tokyo (headquarters) - Located in Kioichō, Chiyoda, Tokyo, on the former site of the Legal Research and Training Institute of the Supreme Court of Japan.
- New York City (2010) - formerly the law firm of Masuda International
- Singapore (2013) - Nagashima & Ohno also operated an office in Singapore from 1993 to 1996

The firm is affiliated with Allens Arthur Robinson in Australia and with Zhong Lun in the People's Republic of China.
