= Gao Zongze =

Chinese lawyer

Gao Zongze is a Beijing attorney and politician. He currently a senior partner at multinational law firm King & Wood Mallesons. Gao also holds many national political appointments, serves on multiple corporate boards, and was the former president of the All China Lawyers Association, the national bar association for China governing the nation's 110,000 lawyers. He also serves as a consultant to the Supreme People's Court of the People's Republic of China.

== Career ==
Gao graduated from the Dalian Maritime Transportation College and then continued his studies at the China Academy of Social Sciences where he later became a lecturer. he served as the president of the All China Lawyer's Association and serves on the boards of Huaneng Power International, Tianjin Capital Environmental Protection Group, Golden Meditech Holdings, HL Corp, and Lumena Resources Group. Gao also served as the President of the Inter-Pacific Bar Association. He currently is a senior partner at King & Wood since 2004.

Gao's political involvement also extends to the Chinese People's Political Consultative Conference, a national advisory board to the legislature.
