= Kanagawa 3rd district =

- Parliamentary constituency for the Japanese House of Representatives
- Numbered map of the Kanagawa Prefecture single seats in Yokohama
- Prefecture: Kanagawa
- Proportional District: Southern Kanto
- Electorate: 447,128

Current constituency
- Created: 1994
- Seats: One
- Party: LDP
- Representatives: Kenji Nakanishi
- Municipalities: Kanagawa-ku and Tsurumi-ku of Yokohama

Kanagawa 3rd district (神奈川県第3区, Kanagawa-ken dai-sanku or simply 神奈川3区, Kanagawa-sanku) is a single-member constituency of the House of Representatives in the national Diet of Japan located in Kanagawa Prefecture.

== Areas covered ==
=== Since 1994 ===
- Yokohama
  - Kanagawa-ku
  - Tsurumi-ku

== List of representatives ==
| Election | Representative | Party | Notes |
|---|---|---|---|
| 1996 | Tomoo Nishikawa | New Frontier | |
| 1996 | Tomoo Nishikawa | Reform Club | |
| 2000 | Hachiro Okonogi | LDP | |
| 2003 | Hachiro Okonogi | LDP | |
| 2005 | Hachiro Okonogi | LDP | |
| 2009 | Eiko Okamoto | Democratic | |
| 2009 | Eiko Okamoto | PLF | |
| 2009 | Eiko Okamoto | Tomorrow | |
| 2012 | Hachiro Okonogi | LDP | Okonogi resigned on July 18, 2021 to run for mayor of Yokohama. |
| 2014 | Hachiro Okonogi | LDP | Okonogi resigned on July 18, 2021 to run for mayor of Yokohama. |
| 2017 | Hachiro Okonogi | LDP | Okonogi resigned on July 18, 2021 to run for mayor of Yokohama. |
| 2021 | Kenji Nakanishi | LDP | |
| 2024 | Kenji Nakanishi | LDP | |
| 2026 | Kenji Nakanishi | LDP | |

== Election results ==
=== 2026 ===
2026
| Party | Candidate | Votes | % | ±% |
|---|---|---|---|---|
| LDP | Kenji Nakanishi (Incumbent) | 114,485 | 47.7 | ▲7.16 |
| Centrist Reform | Taketo Nakamura | 48,460 | 20.2 | ▼11.25 |
| DPP | Ken Ninomiya | 41,843 | 17.4 | New |
| Sanseitō | Mie Ogino | 22,074 | 9.2 | ▲0.90 |
| JCP | Seigo Yokoyama | 12,974 | 5.4 | ▼2.59 |
| Majority | | 66,025 | 27.5 | ▲18.41 |
| Registered electors | | 448,375 | | |
| Turnout | | 239,836 | 54.43 | ▲1.88 |
| LDP hold | | | | |

=== 2024 ===
2024
| Party | Candidate | Votes | % | ±% |
|---|---|---|---|---|
| LDP | Kenji Nakanishi (Incumbent) | 92,125 | 40.54 | ▼12.00 |
| CDP | Taketo Nakamura | 71,464 | 31.45 | ▲1.28 |
| Ishin | Kaoru Sato | 26,622 | 11.72 | New |
| Sanseitō | Emiko Uchida | 18,866 | 8.30 | New |
| JCP | Seigo Yokoyama | 18,145 | 7.99 | ▼2.28 |
| Majority | | 20,661 | 9.09 | |
| Registered electors | | 445,947 | | |
| Turnout | | | 52.55 | ▼0.09 |
| LDP hold | | | | |

=== 2021 ===
2021
| Party | Candidate | Votes | % | ±% |
|---|---|---|---|---|
| LDP | Kenji Nakanishi | 119,199 | 52.54 | ▲2.32 |
| CDP | Taketo Kobayashi | 68,457 | 30.17 | New |
| JCP | Tadaaki Kisaki | 23,310 | 10.27 | ▼1.39 |
| Independent | Akiko Fujimura | 15,908 | 7.02 | New |
| Majority | | 50,742 | 22.37 | |
| Registered electors | | 442,398 | | |
| Turnout | | | 52.64 | ▲4.78 |
| LDP hold | | | | |

=== 2017 ===
2017
| Party | Candidate | Votes | % | ±% |
|---|---|---|---|---|
| LDP | Hachiro Okonogi (Incumbent) | 101,157 | 50.22 | ▲0.03 |
| Kibō no Tō | Koichiro Katsumata | 46,284 | 22.98 | New |
| Independent | Kumiko Ito | 26,314 | 13.07 | New |
| JCP | Susumu Kugimaru | 23,476 | 11.66 | ▼3.96 |
| Happiness Realization | Aiko Iki | 4,177 | 2.07 | N/A |
| Majority | | 54,873 | 27.24 | |
| Registered electors | | 433,774 | | |
| Turnout | | | 47.86 | ▼2.79 |
| LDP hold | | | | |

=== 2014 ===
2014
| Party | Candidate | Votes | % | ±% |
|---|---|---|---|---|
| LDP | Hachiro Okonogi (Incumbent) | 102,323 | 50.19 | ▲13.21 |
| Democratic | Koichiro Katsumata | 50,199 | 24.62 | ▲9.59 |
| JCP | Tadaaki Kisaki | 31,853 | 15.62 | ▲8.36 |
| Future Generations | Mitsuhiro Yokota | 19,516 | 9.57 | New |
| Majority | | 52,124 | 25.57 | |
| Registered electors | | 419,186 | | |
| Turnout | | | 50.65 | ▼6.80 |
| LDP hold | | | | |

=== 2012 ===
2012
| Party | Candidate | Votes | % | ±% |
|---|---|---|---|---|
| LDP | Hachiro Okonogi | 85,451 | 36.98 | ▲2.49 |
| Restoration | Mayumi Takahashi | 39,781 | 17.21 | New |
| Democratic | Koichiro Katsumata | 34,738 | 15.03 | ▼33.42 |
| Your | Takeshi Moro | 32,189 | 13.93 | ▲6.07 |
| Tomorrow | Eiko Okamoto (Incumbent) | 22,163 | 9.59 | New |
| JCP | Kayo Motohashi | 16,773 | 7.26 | ▼0.22 |
| Majority | | 45,670 | 19.77 | |
| Registered electors | | | | |
| Turnout | | | 57.45 | ▼7.63 |
| LDP gain from Tomorrow | | | | |

=== 2009 ===
2009
| Party | Candidate | Votes | % | ±% |
|---|---|---|---|---|
| Democratic | Eiko Okamoto | 125,856 | 48.45 | ▲17.53 |
| LDP | Hachiro Okonogi (Incumbent) | 89,588 | 34.49 | ▼18.71 |
| Your | Masanori Kato | 20,407 | 7.86 | New |
| JCP | Yasuhiko Furuya | 19,419 | 7.48 | ▼1.32 |
| Independent | Koichiro Yamashita | 2,279 | 0.88 | ▼1.14 |
| Happiness Realization | Masahiro Tokushima | 2,206 | 0.84 | New |
| Majority | | 36,268 | 13.96 | |
| Registered electors | | | | |
| Turnout | | | 65.08 | |
| Democratic gain from LDP | | | | |

=== 2005 ===
2005
| Party | Candidate | Votes | % | ±% |
|---|---|---|---|---|
| LDP | Hachiro Okonogi (Incumbent) | 131,831 | 53.20 | ▲9.08 |
| Democratic | Naohiko Kato | 76,625 | 30.92 | ▼8.75 |
| JCP | Tsutomu Ohtani | 21,810 | 8.80 | ▼0.33 |
| NP-Nippon | Toshihisa Kono | 12,537 | 5.06 | New |
| Independent | Koichiro Yamashita | 5,007 | 2.02 | ▼0.15 |
| Majority | | 55,206 | 22.28 | |
| Registered electors | | | | |
| Turnout | | | | |
| LDP hold | | | | |

=== 2003 ===
2003
| Party | Candidate | Votes | % | ±% |
|---|---|---|---|---|
| LDP | Hachiro Okonogi (Incumbent) | 91,207 | 44.12 | ▲14.85 |
| Democratic | Naohiko Kato (Won PR seat) | 81,996 | 39.67 | ▲5.68 |
| JCP | Tsutomu Ohtani | 18,867 | 9.13 | ▼5.04 |
| Social Democratic | Shigeru Wada | 10,158 | 4.91 | New |
| Independent | Koichiro Yamashita | 4,489 | 2.17 | New |
| Majority | | 9,211 | 4.45 | |
| Registered electors | | | | |
| Turnout | | | | |
| LDP hold | | | | |

=== 2000 ===
2000
| Party | Candidate | Votes | % | ±% |
|---|---|---|---|---|
| LDP | Hachiro Okonogi | 61,016 | 29.27 | ▼0.14 |
| Democratic | Naohiko Kato | 55,389 | 26.57 | New |
| Reform Club | Tomoo Nishikawa (Incumbent) | 41,429 | 19.87 | New |
| JCP | Tetsuya Ōmachi | 29,546 | 14.17 | ▲0.03 |
| Liberal | Shigenori Kamachi | 15,478 | 7.42 | New |
| Liberal League | Sayoko Kimura | 5,613 | 2.70 | ▲2.03 |
| Majority | | 5,627 | 2.70 | |
| Registered electors | | | | |
| Turnout | | | | |
| LDP gain from Reform Club (Japan, 1998) | | | | |

=== 1996 ===
1996
| Party | Candidate | Votes | % | ±% |
|---|---|---|---|---|
| New Frontier | Tomoo Nishikawa | 60,360 | 31.31 | New |
| LDP | Hachiro Okonogi (Won PR seat) | 56,700 | 29.41 | New |
| Democratic | Naohiko Kato | 41,750 | 21.66 | New |
| JCP | Takezi Kurasaki | 27,258 | 14.14 | New |
| New Socialist | Nobuhiro Akita | 5,426 | 2.81 | New |
| Liberal League | Shuma Sawaguchi | 1,291 | 0.67 | New |
| Majority | | 3,660 | 1.90 | |
| Registered electors | | | | |
| Turnout | | | | |
| New Frontier win (new seat) | | | | |
