= Chiba College of Health Science =

Public junior college in Mihama-ku, Chiba, Japan

Coordinates: 35°39′53.62″N 140°03′53.86″E

- 千葉県立衛生短期大学; Chiba kenritsu eisei tanki daigaku
- Type: Public
- Active: 1981–2011
- Location: Mihama-ku, Chiba, Chiba, Japan
- Website: Official website

Chiba College of Health Science (千葉県立衛生短期大学, Chiba kenritsu eisei tanki daigaku) was a Public junior college in Mihama-ku, Chiba, Japan, established in 1981. It was merged into Chiba Prefectural University of Health Sciences in 2009 and closed in March 2011.
