= Chiba Prefectural University of Health Sciences =

University in Chiba, Japan

Coordinates: 35°39′9″N 140°3′5.7″E

- 千葉県立保健医療大学
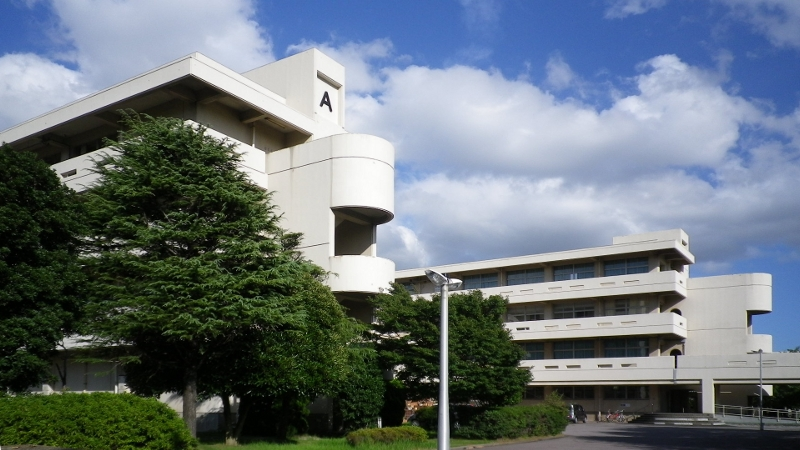
- Makuhari Campus
- Type: Public
- Established: 2009
- Faculty: Full-time 89 (May 2011)
- Students: 729 (June 2012)
- Location: Chiba, Chiba Prefecture, Japan
- Website: www.pref.chiba.lg.jp/hoidai/index.html

Chiba Prefectural University of Health Sciences (千葉県立保健医療大学, Chiba Kenritsu Hoken Iryō Daigaku) is a public university in Mihama-ku, Chiba, Chiba Prefecture, Japan. It was established in 2009 by integrating Chiba College of Health Science (present-day Makuhari Campus, founded in 1981) with Chiba Prefectural College of Allied Medical Science (present-day Nitona Campus).

== Organization ==
=== Undergraduate schools ===
- Faculty of Health Care Sciences
  - Department of Nursing (Makuhari Campus)
  - Department of Nutrition (Makuhari Campus)
  - Department of Dental Hygiene (Makuhari Campus)
  - Department of Rehabilitation Sciences (Nitona Campus)
