= Blue Box (manga) =

Japanese manga series by Kouji Miura

- First tankōbon volume cover, featuring Chinatsu Kano (left) and Taiki Inomata (right)

アオのハコ (Ao no Hako)
- Genre: Romance; Sports
- Manga
- Written by: Kouji Miura
- Published by: Shueisha
- English publisher: NA: Viz Media
- Imprint: Jump Comics
- Magazine: Weekly Shōnen Jump
- Original run: April 12, 2021 – July 13, 2026
- Volumes: 27
- Anime television series
- Directed by: Yūichirō Yano (S1); Daisuke Sakō (S2)
- Written by: Yūko Kakihara
- Music by: Takashi Ohmama
- Studio: Telecom Animation Film (animation) (S1); Electric Circus (animation) (S2); TMS Entertainment (production and planning) (Note: Under the "Unlimited Produce by TMS" brand)
- Licensed by: Netflix
- Original network: JNN (TBS)
- Original run: October 3, 2024 – present
- Episodes: 32
- icon

Blue Box (Japanese: アオのハコ, Hepburn: Ao no Hako) is a Japanese manga series written and illustrated by Kouji Miura. It was serialized in Shueisha's Weekly Shōnen Jump from April 2021 to July 2026, with its chapters collected in 27 tankōbon volumes as of October 2026. An anime television series adaptation produced by TMS Entertainment and animated by Telecom Animation Film aired from October 2024 to March 2025. A second season animated by Electric Circus premiered in October 2026.

By May 2026, the manga has over 10 million copies in circulation.

== Synopsis ==
The series focuses on Taiki Inomata, a student at Eimei Junior and Senior High, an athletics-oriented school, where he is a member of the boys' badminton team and is considered simply average. Every morning, he trains to get better early in the gym, often at the same time and place as his upperclasswoman Chinatsu Kano, the star of the girls' basketball team. Taiki quickly develops a crush on her, but is initially too shy to speak to her despite their continual alone time together. His fortunes change, however, when Chinatsu moves in with Taiki's family after her parents leave Japan to work abroad. With Chinatsu now living with him, Taiki aims to slowly develop his relationship with her as they both strive to make it to the national championship with their respective teams.

== Characters ==
=== Main ===
Taiki Inomata (猪股 大喜, Inomata Taiki)
Voiced by: Shōya Chiba (Japanese); Zach Aguilar (English)
An avid badminton player, Taiki strives to succeed despite setbacks. He greatly admires Chinatsu for her dedication to basketball and harbors a huge crush on her. While he is often awkward and emotional, his unwavering determination and sincerity slowly earns him respect from others. His goal is to reach the national championship, a dream he shares with Chinatsu in their respective sports. His mother was Chinatsu's mother's teammate and friend, hence the decision for Chinatsu to move in with Taiki. He is aware of Hina being in love with him, but doesn't reciprocate her feelings and rejects her, leading to the two drifting apart. He later starts a relationship with Chinatsu.
Chinatsu Kano (鹿野 千夏, Kano Chinatsu)
Voiced by: Reina Ueda (Japanese); Xanthe Huynh (English)
Chinatsu is the star player of the girls' basketball team. She is one grade above Taiki and is often the first person at practice. Once a terrible basketball player, her dedication has helped her grow into a strong player with hopes of making it into the national championships. She moves in with Taiki's family when her parents leave to work abroad, and she and Taiki slowly become friends supporting each other. She is oblivious to Taiki being in love with her, but she enjoys his company and cares for him deeply. She later becomes Taiki's girlfriend, with the two continuing their relationship even after she moves out of the Inomata household.
Hina Chōno (蝶野 雛, Chōno Hina)
Voiced by: Akari Kitō (Japanese); Kayli Mills (English)
Hina is Taiki's childhood friend who is on the rhythmic gymnastics team. She is quite theatrical and loves to tease Taiki. Although initially only seeing him as a close friend, she slowly realizes she has fallen in love with Taiki later on, despite encouraging him to go after Chinatsu. Taiki is completely oblivious to her feelings, and is often annoyed by her playful teasing, although he does genuinely care for her. She later confesses her feelings to Taiki, and becomes rivals with Chinatsu for his love, wanting him to be her boyfriend. However, Taiki rejects her, telling her that he doesn't reciprocate her feelings at all, which devastates her deeply. Following his rejection, she grows cold towards him and they drift apart from each other, before finally trying to repair their friendship despite still struggling with her feelings towards him.

=== Supporting ===
Kyo Kasahara (笠原 匡, Kasahara Kyō)
Voiced by: Chiaki Kobayashi (Japanese); Caden Shaffer (English)
Kyo is Taiki's best friend and fellow badminton player. Quiet and observant, he often understands more than anyone else. Though sarcastic, especially with Taiki, he is a genuinely caring and wise person.
Kengo Haryū (針生 健吾, Haryū Kengo)
Voiced by: Yuma Uchida (Japanese); Daman Mills (English)
Kengo is a skilled badminton player in Chinatsu's grade who ends up becoming a mentor and rival to Taiki. Though he is often hard on Taiki, he slowly grows to admire his tenacity and growing skill.
Ryōsuke Nishida (西田 諒介, Nishida Ryōsuke)
Voiced by: Shogo Sakata (Japanese); Jacob Hopkins (English)
The captain of the badminton team.
Nagisa Funami (船見 渚, Funami Nagisa)
Voiced by: Anna Nagase (Japanese); Emi Lo (English)
A member of the basketball team alongside Chinatsu.
Niina Shimazaki (島崎 にいな, Shimazaki Niina)
Voiced by: Asaki Yuikawa (Japanese); Kira Buckland (English)
A member of the rhythmic gymnastics team alongside Hina.
Shoichiro Kishi (岸 祥一郎, Kishi Shōichirō)
Voiced by: Kengo Kawanishi (Japanese); Sean Chiplock (English)
Haryū's previous doubles match partner.
Shōta Hyōdō (兵藤 将太, Hyōdō Shōta)
Voiced by: Yūki Ono (Japanese); Christian La Monte (English)
A skilled badminton player from Sajikawa High whom Haryū considers his chief rival, due to Haryū having never beaten him in badminton matches.
Shūji Yusa (遊佐 柊仁, Yusa Shūji)
Voiced by: Kensho Ono (Japanese); Griffin Burns (English)
A skilled badminton player from Sajikawa High who is a teammate of Hyōdō despite appearing lethargic.
Karen Moriya (守屋 花恋, Moriya Karen)
Voiced by: Haruka Shiraishi (Japanese); Cristina Vee (English)
Haryū's girlfriend and Ayame's older sister who is a childhood friend of him and Chinatsu.
Ayame Moriya (守屋 菖蒲, Moriya Ayame)
Voiced by: Kana Ichinose (Japanese); Megan Taylor Harvey (English)
Karen's younger sister who is the team manager of the badminton team. She becomes a close friend of Hina following her being rejected by Taiki.
Kazuma Matsuoka (松岡 一馬, Matsuoka Kazuma)
Voiced by: Yuki Kaji (Japanese); Ryan Colt Levy (English)
A member of the boys' basketball team who returned to Japan from studying abroad in America.
Yumeka Kido (木戸 夢佳, Kido Yumeka)
Voiced by: Yoshino Aoyama (Japanese); Abby Trott (English)
A former member of the basketball team and former friend of Chinatsu who left after losing her passion and love for the sport.

== Media ==
=== Manga ===
Written and illustrated by Kouji Miura, Blue Box was originally a one-shot that was published in Shueisha's shōnen manga magazine Weekly Shōnen Jump on August 3, 2020. It was later serialized in the same magazine from April 12, 2021, to July 13, 2026. Shueisha has collected its chapters into individual tankōbon volumes. The first volume was released on August 4, 2021. As of October 2, 2026, 27 volumes have been released.

Blue Box has been licensed for simultaneous publication in North America as it is released in Japan, with its chapters being digitally launched by Viz Media on its Shonen Jump website. Shueisha also simulpublishes the series in English for free on the Manga Plus app and website. In February 2022, Viz Media announced that they had licensed the series in print format; the first volume was released on November 1 of the same year. The manga is also licensed in Indonesia by Elex Media Komputindo.

=== Anime ===
An anime television series adaptation was announced in November 2023. Planned and produced by TMS Entertainment, it is animated by Telecom Animation Film and directed by Yūichirō Yano, with Yūko Kakihara handling series composition and Miho Tanino designing the characters. The series aired for two consecutive cours from October 3, 2024, to March 27, 2025, on TBS and its affiliates. (Note: The first two episodes were released simultaneously on Netflix Japan, while subsequent episodes were released a week before their televised broadcast and international streaming release.) For the first cours, the opening theme is "Same Blue" by Official Hige Dandism, and the ending theme is "Teenage Blue" (ティーンエイジブルー) by Eve; for the second cours, the opening theme is "Saraba" (然らば) by Macaroni Empitsu, and the ending theme is "Contrast" (コントラスト) by Tomoo. Netflix licensed the series and is streaming it worldwide.

A second season was announced immediately following the airing of the finale episode of the first season, with Daisuke Sakō taking over as director and animated by Electric Circus. It premiered on TBS on October 4, 2026. The opening theme is "Anata no Hana no Iro" (あなたの花の色) by Aiko, and the ending theme is "Blue In" by Elsewhere Kikou.

== Reception ==
=== Popularity ===
In August 2021, the first volume of the manga had over 170,000 copies in circulation in less than a week after its release. By October 2025, the manga had over 9 million copies in circulation; by May 2026, the manga had over 10 million copies in circulation.

In June 2021, Blue Box was nominated for the seventh Next Manga Award in the Best Print Manga category; it placed eighth out of 50 nominees, but won the Global Prize. The series ranked fourth on the Nationwide Bookstore Employees' Recommended Comics of 2022.

=== Critical response ===
Blue Box received critical acclaim. Anthony Gramuglia of Comic Book Resources (CBR) stated, "Blue Box is a sentimental story about human connection. It's beautifully drawn, at times resembling a shōjo manga more than a typical shōnen. If Blue Box continues, it will likely become an earnest, sincere entry in Shōnen Jump's romantic catalog". Timothy Donohoo of CBR compared Blue Box to Kenta Shinohara's Witch Watch and Shigure Tokita's Don't Blush, Sekime-san! due to both series having concepts and romantic aspects similar to Blue Box's.

=== Accolades ===
Year	Award	Category	Recipient	Result	Ref.
2025	Reiwa Anisong Awards	Artist Song Award	"Same Blue" by Official Hige Dandism	Nominated	
2025	D Anime Store Awards	Heart-Pounding Anime	Blue Box	Won	
2025	9th Crunchyroll Anime Awards	Best Romance	Blue Box	Won	
2025	Japan Expo Awards	Daruma for Best Anime	Blue Box	Nominated	
2025	Japan Expo Awards	Daruma for Best Romance Anime	Blue Box	Won	
2025	Japan Expo Awards	Daruma for Best Slice of Anime	Blue Box	Nominated	
2025	Japan Expo Awards	Daruma for Best Opening	"Same Blue" by Official Hige Dandism	Nominated	
2025	20th AnimaniA Awards	Best TV Series: Online	Blue Box	Nominated	
2025	20th AnimaniA Awards	Best Anime Song	"Same Blue" by Official Hige Dandism	Nominated	
2026	12th Anime Trending Awards	Anime of the Year	Blue Box	Nominated	
2026	12th Anime Trending Awards	Girl of the Year	Chinatsu Kano	Nominated	
2026	12th Anime Trending Awards	Couple or Ship of the Year	Taiki and Chinatsu	Nominated	
2026	12th Anime Trending Awards	Supporting Boy of the Year	Kyo Kasahara	Nominated	
2026	12th Anime Trending Awards	Best in Adapted Screenplay	Blue Box	Nominated	
2026	12th Anime Trending Awards	Best in Character Design	Blue Box	Nominated	
2026	12th Anime Trending Awards	Best in Sceneries and Visuals	Blue Box	Nominated	
2026	12th Anime Trending Awards	Opening Theme Song of the Year	"Same Blue" by Official Hige Dandism	Nominated	
2026	12th Anime Trending Awards	Ending Theme Song of the Year	"Teenage Blue" by Eve	Nominated	
2026	12th Anime Trending Awards	Drama Anime of the Year	Blue Box	Nominated	
2026	12th Anime Trending Awards	Romance Anime of the Year	Blue Box	Nominated	
2026	12th Anime Trending Awards	Sports Anime of the Year	Blue Box	Nominated	
2026	12th Anime Trending Awards	Best Voice Acting Performance - Female	Akari Kitō as Hina Chōno	Nominated	
2026	10th Crunchyroll Anime Awards	Best Drama	Blue Box	Nominated	
2026	10th Crunchyroll Anime Awards	Best Romance	Blue Box	Nominated	
2026	10th Crunchyroll Anime Awards	Best Slice of Life	Blue Box	Nominated	
