= Kouji Miura =

Japanese manga artist (born 1995)

- 三浦 糀
- Born: 28 March 1995 (age 31)
- Occupation: Manga artist
- Known for: Blue Box; I Love You, My Teacher

Kouji Miura (三浦 糀, Miura Kōji; born 28 March 1995) is a Japanese manga artist best known as the creator of the Blue Box and I Love You, My Teacher manga series. She won a special honorable mention for new artists at the 90th Weekly Shōnen Magazine Awards in 2013, and a second honorable mention at the 91st Weekly Shōnen Magazine Awards that same year. In 2017, her one-shot of I Love You, My Teacher won the Magazine Pocket One-Shot Award. Her one-shot Parasol Alliance won the Garyokin Pro Drawing King Award in 2019, and Blue Box won the Global Prize at the 2021 Next Manga Awards.

She has used Satoshi Yūki and Amami as pseudonyms during her manga career.

== Biography ==
Kouji Miura was born on 28 March 1995. She graduated from the Department of Arts and Culture at Musashino Art University. Her debut work was the one-shot manga Yoku to (よくと) under the pseudonym Satoshi Yūki (結城智史, Yūki Satoshi). It won a Newcomers Special Honorable Mention at the 90th Weekly Shōnen Magazine Awards. Her second one-shot manga, Thirst, won an Honorable Mention at the 91st Weekly Shōnen Magazine Awards. It was subsequently released in the January 2014 issue of Magazine Special.

Her first serialized story, Aozora Rubber (青空ラバー, Aozora Rabā), ran from 2015 to 2016 on the mobile manga app Manga Box. A one-shot version of I Love You, My Teacher won a contest on the Magazine Pocket web comics site, where it was published on January 25, 2017. It was subsequently published in the print manga magazine Weekly Shōnen Magazine in 2017 issue 25 where it was popular with readers, who called it "cute and erotic". Because of that positive reader response, Teacher was serialized from issue 4/5 to issue 28 of Weekly Shōnen Magazine. It moved to Magazine Pocket beginning 4 July 2018 before finishing its run on 29 August with a total of 33 chapters.

Miura received the Drawing King Gold Award from Shueisha for the one-shot Parasol Alliance, which was published in the Spring 2020 issue of Jump Giga. The romantic comedy Blue Box was serialized from issue 2021 #19 to issue 2026 #33 of Weekly Shōnen Jump. It won the Global Prize at the 2021 Next Manga Awards, where it also placed 8th overall in the Best Print Manga category. Viz Media is releasing the series in print and digitally English in North America.

== Bibliography ==
Works are listed in order of publication.

- Yoku to (よくと) (one-shot under Satoshi Yūki, won a Newcomers Special Honorable Mention at the 90th Weekly Shōnen Magazine Awards)
- Thirst (one-shot under Yūki Satoshi, won an Honorable Mention at the 91st Weekly Shōnen Magazine Awards)
- Aozora Lover (青空ラバー, Aozora Rabā) (2015–2016, first serialized story, 2 volumes, Manga Box)
- I Love You, My Teacher (先生、好きです。, Sensei, Suki Desu) (2017–2018, 4 volumes, Weekly Shōnen Magazine and the Magazine Pocket website)
- Haru's Repayment (ハルの恩返し, Haru no Ongaeshi) (one-shot, 2019 #52 issue of Weekly Shōnen Magazine)
- Parasol Alliance (ぱらそる同盟, Parasoru Dōmei) (one-shot under the pseudonym Amami (あまみ), spring 2020 issue of Jump Giga)
- Ao no Hako (アオのハコ) (one-shot, 2020 #35 issue of Weekly Shōnen Jump)
- Blue Box (アオのハコ, Ao no Hako) (2021–2026, Weekly Shōnen Jump)

== Reception ==
Readers of the 2017 one-shot of I Love You, My Teacher described the work as "cute and erotic", and it was popular enough that it begin serialization in Weekly Shōnen Magazine in 2018. Comic Book Resources described Miura's art work on Blue Box as "beautifully drawn, at times resembling a shojo manga more than a typical shonen [manga]". The Daily Star praised her use of romantic tropes in Blue Box—stating she handled them "in a more realistic and grounded way" than many other series—and her "clean and realistic art style" and "careful accuracy and attention-to-detail". However, they criticized how she handled the secondary sports, stating they "aren't nearly as fleshed out".

=== Awards and recognition ===
Miura has received the following accolades and recognition:

Year	Organization	Award title, Category	Work	Result	Refs
2013	Weekly Shōnen Magazine	90th Weekly Shōnen Magazine Newcomer Manga Award	Yoku to	Special Honorable Mention	
2013	Weekly Shōnen Magazine	91st Weekly Shōnen Magazine Newcomer Manga Award	thirst	Honorable Mention	
2017	Kodansha	Magazine Pocket One-Shot	I Love You, My Teacher	Won	
2019	Shueisha	4th Garyokin Pro, Drawing King Gold	Parasol Alliance	Won	
2021	Da Vinci / Niconico	Next Manga Award, Best Print Manga	Blue Box	8	
2021	Da Vinci / Niconico	Next Manga Award, Global Prize	Blue Box	Won	
