= Tomoo (singer) =

Japanese singer (born 1995)

- Born: June 28, 1995 (age 31); Tokyo, Japan
- Genre: J-pop
- Occupations: Singer, songwriter
- Years active: 2014–present
- Label: Pony Canyon

Tomoo (stylized as TOMOO, born June 28, 1995) is a Japanese singer from Tokyo who is affiliated with Pony Canyon under its label Irori Records. She began her music career after being a finalist at a Yamaha Corporation-sponsored contest in 2013. She released her first mini-album in 2016 and made her major debut in 2021. Her songs have been featured in anime series such as Blue Box and City: The Animation. She held a solo concert at the Nippon Budokan in 2025.

== Biography ==
Tomoo was born in Tokyo on June 28, 1995. Her interest in music began at an early age from watching The Lion King and imitating the film's songs, as well as from watching Studio Ghibli films. Her parents bought her a toy piano which she kept playing until she broke it. Not long after, her parents bought her an electronic piano, with which she would play music from the films she watched by ear. When she was in elementary, she started taking piano lessons from a teacher who lived in the same apartment building as her family. In junior high school, she became a member of the drama club, having been inspired by a class performance she was a part of in elementary. It was during this time she decided to pursue a music career after reading a letter given to her by a friend, which inspired her to write a song.

In 2013, Tomoo entered Music Revolution, a music contest organized by Yamaha Corporation. At the time, she had been interested in participating in singing contests but did not join them as they were targeted towards bands rather than solo singers. However, as she was close to taking university entrance exams, she decided to join one. Although she was chosen as one of the finalists, she was unhappy with her performance as she felt her singing skills were inadequate, having never sung in public prior to the contest. After entering university, she started a music career in 2014, releasing the mini-album Wanna V in 2016.

Tomoo gained attention in 2021 after releasing the song "Ginger"; its music video has been viewed over a million times. In 2022, she made her major debut under Pony Canyon's label Irori Records. She released her first album Two Moon in September 2023. In 2025, she released her first anime song, "Contrast", which was used as the second ending theme to the anime television series Blue Box. She held a solo concert at the Nippon Budokan in May 2025. Her song "Lucky" was used as the ending theme to the anime television series City: The Animation.

== Musical style and influences ==
Tomoo cites Joe Hisaishi's music as a major influence in her work, having been inspired by her childhood love for Studio Ghibli's works. She was also a fan of Japanese artists such as Yui, Aqua Timez, Kobukuro, and Kōji Tamaki. In junior high school, she became a fan of Evanescence; at the time, she was going through a phase where she preferred listening to darker music than to more cheerful songs.

Her musical style and production evolved throughout her career: in an interview with Spice, she noted that Wanna V's production was complicated owing to her having no prior band experience. Her next two mini-albums, Blink and Topaz, had desktop music influences, although its songs were arranged by others.

Tomoo's breakout song "Ginger" was inspired by a pet cat she had gotten, which was not particularly attached to her. She wanted to write a song inspired by her cat, but ended up also being influenced by herself and the people around her. Her sentiment was for people to not just label things based on whether or not they believe things are good or bad.

Tomoo's song "Lucky", which was used as the ending theme to City: The Animation, was composed to sound like a song from the 1970s. Tomoo read the original manga to prepare for writing the song, wanting to express the character's quirkiness and personality. Some of the words used in the song were inspired by moments from the series; for example, the use of the word "juice" in the lyrics was inspired by multiple scenes of people buying juice in the story.

== Discography ==
=== Albums ===
List of studio albums, with selected details, chart positions
Title	Details	Peak positions
Title	Details	JPN
Two Moon	Released: September 27, 2023; Label: Pony Canyon/Irori Records; Formats: CD, digital download, streaming	17
Dear Mysteries	Released: November 12, 2025; Label: Pony Canyon/Irori Records; Formats:	10

=== Singles ===
List of singles, with year released and album name
Title	Year	Album
"Yukidatta / Michi" (雪だった / 道)	2019	
"10 Seconds of Falling in Love" (恋する10秒)	2019	
"Stand in the Wind" (風に立つ)	2020	
"Honey Boy"	2021	Two Moon
"Ginger"	2021	Two Moon
"Superstar" (スーパースター)	2021	
"Eimosezu/Good Luck" (酔ひもせす/グッドラック)	2022	
"Othello" (オセロ)	2022	Two Moon
"17"	2022	Two Moon
"Cinderella"	2023	Two Moon
"Yume wa Sametemo" (夢はさめても)	2023	Two Moon
"Yoake no Kimi e" (夜明けの君へ)	2023	Two Moon
"Grapefruit Moon"	2023	Two Moon
"Present"	2024	Dear Mysteries
"Awaini" (あわいに)	2024	Dear Mysteries
"Endless" (エンドレス)	2024	Dear Mysteries
"Contrast" (コントラスト)	2025	Dear Mysteries
"Lucky"	2025	Dear Mysteries
"Gyoza" (餃子)	2025	Dear Mysteries
