= Kiyoharu Ishiwata =

Japanese politician

Kiyoharu Ishiwata (石渡 清元, Ishiwata Kiyoharu, 9 December 1940 – January 20, 2014) was a Japanese politician. He was a member of the House of Councillors from 1989 to 2001.

Ishiwata died of heart failure at the age of 73.
