= Nishimura & Asahi =

Japanese law firm

Nishimura & Asahi 西村あさひ
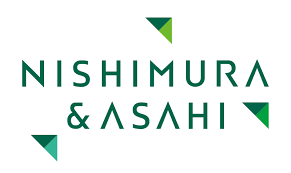
- Headquarters: Tokyo, Japan
- No. of offices: 22+
- No. of lawyers: 900+ (2026)
- Major practice areas: General Practice
- Date founded: 1966
- Founder: Toshiro Nishimura
- Company type: Consists of a Japanese partnership, Japanese professional corporation and Singaporean limited liability partnership
- Website: Official website

Nishimura & Asahi (西村あさひ) is the largest of the "Big Four" law firms in Japan, as of January 2024, by number of lawyers.

== History ==
The firm's current form was established in 2007 by the acquisition of the Kokusai Bumon (International Division) of Asahi Law Offices (the former Asahi Koma Law Offices, itself a merger of the Masuda & Ejiri and Komatsu Koma law firms) by Nishimura & Partners (one of the "Big Four" and founded in 1966). The firm is a member of the international legal network Lex Mundi.

In October 2023, Nishimura & Asahi updated its logo.

== Clients and services ==
The Legal 500 ranks N&A as a top tier firm in the fields of antitrust and competition law, banking and finance, capital markets, corporate and M&A, dispute resolution, intellectural property, investment funds, labor and employment, private wealth, projects and energy, real estate and construction, restructuring and insolvency, risk management and investigations, tax, as well as technology, media, and telecommunications. Chambers & Partners ranks the firm as "Band 1" in banking and finance, capital markets, corporate/M&A, dispute resolution, international & cross-border capabilities (Japanese firms), and international trade.

N&A clients include América Móvil, Citibank, France Telecom, Fuji Fire and Marine Insurance, Johnny & Associates, KDDI, Microsoft, Mizuho Securities, Nippon Steel, NTT, Oriental Land, Tokyo Broadcasting System and Universal Studios Japan.

== Offices ==
Nishimura is headquartered in Tokyo (Otemachi) and has domestic branch offices in Fukuoka, Nagoya, Osaka, and Sapporo. It also has overseas offices in Bangkok, Brussels, Dubai, Dusseldorf, Frankfurt, Hanoi, Ho Chi Minh City, Hong Kong, Jakarta, Kuala Lumpur, Manila, New York, Shanghai, Singapore, Taipei and Yangon.
