= Yoriko Kawaguchi =

Japanese politician (born 1941)

- 川口 順子
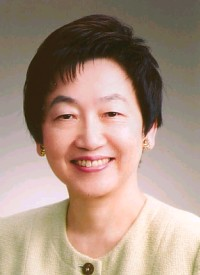
- Official portrait, 2001

Minister for Foreign Affairs
- In office 1 February 2002 – 27 September 2004
- Prime Minister: Junichiro Koizumi
- Preceded by: Junichiro Koizumi (acting); Makiko Tanaka
- Succeeded by: Nobutaka Machimura

Minister of the Environment
- In office 6 January 2001 – 8 February 2002
- Prime Minister: Yoshirō Mori; Junichiro Koizumi
- Preceded by: Herself (as Director-General of the Environmental Agency)
- Succeeded by: Hiroshi Ohki

Director-General of the Environmental Agency
- In office 4 July 2000 – 5 January 2001
- Prime Minister: Yoshirō Mori
- Preceded by: Kayoko Shimizu
- Succeeded by: Herself (as Minister of the Environment)

Member of the House of Councillors
- In office 24 October 2005 – 28 July 2013
- Preceded by: Tsuyoshi Saito
- Succeeded by: Multi-member district
- Constituency: Kanagawa at-large (2005–2007); National PR (2007–2013)

Personal details
- Born: 14 January 1941 (age 85) Tokyo, Empire of Japan (Now Japan)
- Party: Liberal Democratic Party
- Spouse: Toru Kawaguchi
- Children: 2
- Education: University of Tokyo; Yale University
- Website: http://yoriko-kawaguchi.jp

Yoriko Kawaguchi (川口 順子, Kawaguchi Yoriko; born 14 January 1941) is a Japanese politician and former economist, who served as a Japanese Minister of Foreign Affairs from 2002 to 2004 and continued as a special advisor to then-Japanese Prime Minister Junichiro Koizumi for foreign affairs from 2004 to 2005. A member of Liberal Democratic Party, she previously served as a Japanese Minister of the Environment from 2000 to 2002. She was also a member of the House of Councillors for Liberal Democratic Party from 2005 to 2013. In July 2008, she was appointed co-chair of a new International Commission on Nuclear Non-proliferation and Disarmament, with former Australian Foreign Minister Gareth Evans.

Currently, she is a professor at Meiji Institute for Global Affairs, Meiji University in Tokyo.

== Early life and career ==
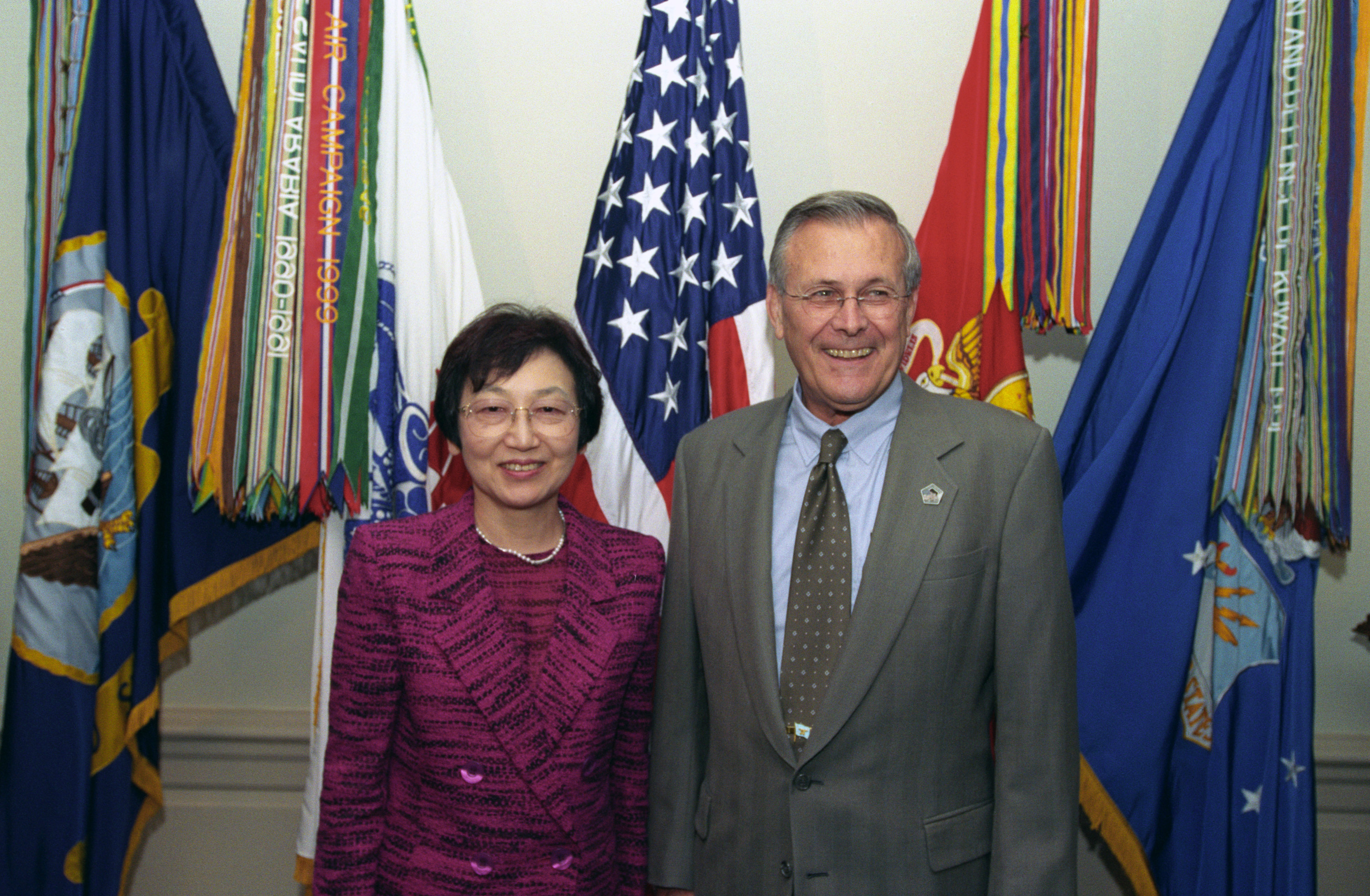
Kawaguchi meeting with then-American Defense Secretary Donald Rumsfeld

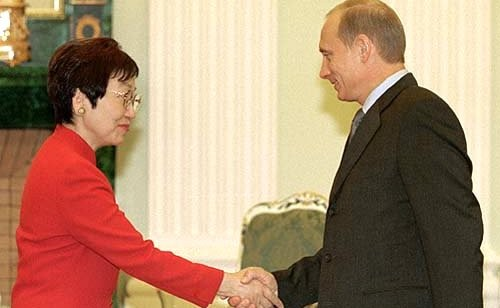
Kawaguchi meeting with Russian President Vladimir Putin (14 October 2002)

Yoriko Kawaguchi was born on 14 January 1941 in Tokyo, Empire of Japan (Now Japan). During her childhood, when she was four years old, she and her family were survived from advancing firebombs in Tokyo during Asia-Pacific War in World War II, although she and her family were remains live in Tokyo throughout the war.

In 1960, at aged 19, she graduated from Tokyo University of Education High School (Now Junior and Senior High School at Komaba, University of Tsukuba). Some of her high school classmates were included Nobuo Habeyanagi (former President of Mitsubishi UFJ Financial Group), Hideki Shimamura (former Director of the National Institute of Polar Research), Yutaka Hoshide (Professor at Showa Academy of Music), Hajime Matsumoto (neuroscientist), and Yozo Yokota (former Special Advisor to the President of the United Nations University).

In early 1965, at aged 24, she graduated with her degree in international relations from the College of Arts and Sciences at the University of Tokyo. In April of the same year, she began working at a Japanese Ministry of International Trade and Industry. In 1972, at aged 31, she obtained her MPhil in economics from Yale University, where would be allow her to work at the World Bank, and she became as a member of President's Council on International Activities.

In 1990, Kawaguchi served as a Minister at a Japanese Embassy to the United States of America. She worked as a Director-General of Global Environmental Affairs at the Ministry of International Trade and Industry (now Japanese Ministry of Economy, Trade, and Industry) between 1992 and 1993 before becoming as a Managing Director of Suntory Holdings Ltd. in September 1993. She was also appointed as a Director-General of the Economic Cooperation Division of Trade Policy Office.

In 2000, she served as a Director-General of the Environment Agency, appointed by then-Japanese Prime Minister Yoshiro Mori. However, as she remains in office, on 6 January 2001, Japanese government announced that Environment Agency has changed into a Ministry of the Environment, with Director-General's position becoming the Minister of the Environment. This is a part of larger effort to strengthen environmental administration, which included expanding ministry's responsibilities, personnel, and focus on global environmental issues. During her brief tenure, she participated as a Japanese delegate at the Climate Summit held in Bonn, Germany, successfully lifting Japan's veto of Kyoto Protocol.

Prior to her term as a Minister of the Environment, on February 1, 2002, she was served as a Japanese Minister of Foreign Affairs, appointed by then-Japanese Prime Minister Junichiro Koizumi, a position she held until her resignation on September 27, 2004 due to facilitate a reorganization of ministerial cabinet, and she was succeeded by Nobutaka Machimura.

She was elected to the House of Councillors in 2005, where she served as two terms until 2013. During her years as a National Diet member, she served as a deputy chair of the General Assembly of Liberal Democratic Party members in the Upper House. She also became the director and chair of the Environment Committee, director of the Budget Committee and director of the Commission on the Constitution. Kawaguchi served as the chair of LDP Okinawa Promotion Committee, as well as a co-chair of International Commission on Nuclear Non-Proliferation and Disarmament and a board member of World Economic Forum's Young Global Leaders Foundation in 2008. Currently, she is a member of Tokyo Foundation CSR Committee.

On 14 April 2011, just one month after the massive earthquake, tsumami, and nuclear disaster in Japan, Kawaguchi participated in a bipartisan study group, opposing the proposed cuts to official development assistance to fundraised for reconstruction budget following triple disaster crisis. Since that same year, she served as a director of Sasakawa Peace Foundation.

After 2013 House of Councillors election, Kawaguchi has decided to announces her retirement from active politics.

=== Controversies ===
Kawaguchi, then-senior lawmaker of ruling coalition Liberal Democratic Party, was ousted from her post as head of the Environment Committee of the House of Councillors when Japan's Upper House passed a resolution to fire her back in May 2013. This is due to her unauthorized extension of stay in China, which made a panel that she led cancel a scheduled session.

Kawaguchi earned the approval of Japanese parliament to go to China from April 23 to 24 to attend a conference but without prior permission, she extended for one more day to meet foreign policy official State Councilor Yang Jiechi. Kawaguchi apologizes to Prime Minister Shinzō Abe, who is also the head of the LDP, of her unannounced leave but reasons that the last-minute arrangements with Yang was for Japan's best interests. This extension gained a lot of criticisms from the opposition parties as Kawaguchi violated parliamentary rules as well neglected her duties. However those who are in defense of the lawmaker such as Chief Cabinet Secretary Yoshihide Suga and LDP Secretary General Shigeru Ishiba say that the meeting between the two ministers was in order to address the territorial dispute going on between Japan and China in the East China Sea.

The meeting was considered a rare chance given the escalated tensions going on between the two countries and that this might not be possible again anytime in the near future. This commotion by the opposition was then seen as a futile attempt to weaken the power of LDP seeing as they control the Lower House and they might take hold of the Upper House with the upcoming elections. However, on 9 May 2013, the resolution of ousting Kawaguchi was passed despite the attempts of administration officials to defend her intentions. The cancelled session scheduled on 25 April of the same year, was the basis of resolution and dismissal. Furthermore, her actions were perceived as disrespect of the power of the Upper House and her duties. The resolution was backed up by 7 opposition parties who then had the control of the Upper House.

== Personal life ==
She is married to Toru Kawaguchi and they have two children together.

Her older sister, Takako Shirai, is a former professor at Chiba Prefectural College of Health Sciences and a researcher of women's liberation theory, including Mary Wollstonecraft .

Her hobbies are reading, listening to music, skiing, and haiku.

== Honors and awards ==
In December 2003, Kawaguchi received "Aguila Azteca Medal" from then-Mexican President Vicente Fox. She is a recipient of an Anniversary Medal from a mayor of Sankt-Peterburg during the 300th anniversary of the city. In March 2004, Paraguayan government awarded Kawaguchi with a "Gran Cruz Extraordinaria" (National Testimonial Medal), and also, in September of the same yeaar, she received a Certificate of Doctor Honoris Causa by the authority of the Academic Council of National University of Mongolia in Ulaanbaatar. In October 2008, Kawaguchi received a Wilbur Cross Medal from Yale University in New Haven, Connecticut for distinguished public service.

In October 2010, Kawaguchi also awarded a "Star of Jerusalem" by Palestinian President Mahmoud Abbas from Palestinian National Authority. At the same month of the same year, she received once again an Anniversary Medal for a major contribution to global security promotion and non-proliferation regime by K. Kadyrzhanov, Director-General of the National Nuclear Center.

On 29 April 2017, Kawaguchi received a Grand Cordon of the Order of Rising Sun in a spring honors, awarded by then-Japanese Emperor Akihito.

House of Councillors
Preceded by Yoshifumi Matsumura	Chair, Committee on Environment of the House of Councillors; 2012–2013	Succeeded by Issei Kitagawa
Political offices
Preceded by Kayoko Shimizu	Director-General of the Environmental Agency; 2000–2001	Succeeded by Herself as Minister of the Environment
Preceded by Herself as Director-General of the Environmental Agency	Minister of the Environment; 2001–2002	Succeeded by Hiroshi Ohki
Preceded by Makiko Tanaka	Minister for Foreign Affairs of Japan; 2002–2004	Succeeded by Nobutaka Machimura
