= Mori Hamada & Matsumoto =

- Headquarters: Chiyoda, Tokyo, Japan
- No. of offices: 17 (9 international)
- No. of attorneys: 819 (Mar. 2026)
- No. of employees: 481 (Jul. 2018)
- Major practice areas: General practice
- Date founded: 1949
- Company type: Partnership under Japanese law
- Website: mhmjapan.com

Mori Hamada & Matsumoto (森・濱田松本法律事務所, Mori Hamada Matsumoto Hōritsu Jimusho) is a law firm in Japan.

The firm was founded in 2002 by the merger of Mori Sogo Law Offices and Hamada & Matsumoto. Mori Sogo Law Offices was founded in 1949. It opened offices in Singapore and Yangon.

== Offices ==
Mori Hamada's main office is in the Marunouchi Park Building in Tokyo. It has domestic branch offices in Fukuoka, Nagoya, Osaka, Takamatsu, Sapporo, Yokohama and Kōchi, and overseas offices in Beijing, Shanghai, Singapore, Bangkok, Yangon, Ho Chi Minh City, Hanoi, New York and San Francisco.
