= Kimie Hatano =

Japanese politician

- 畑野 君枝
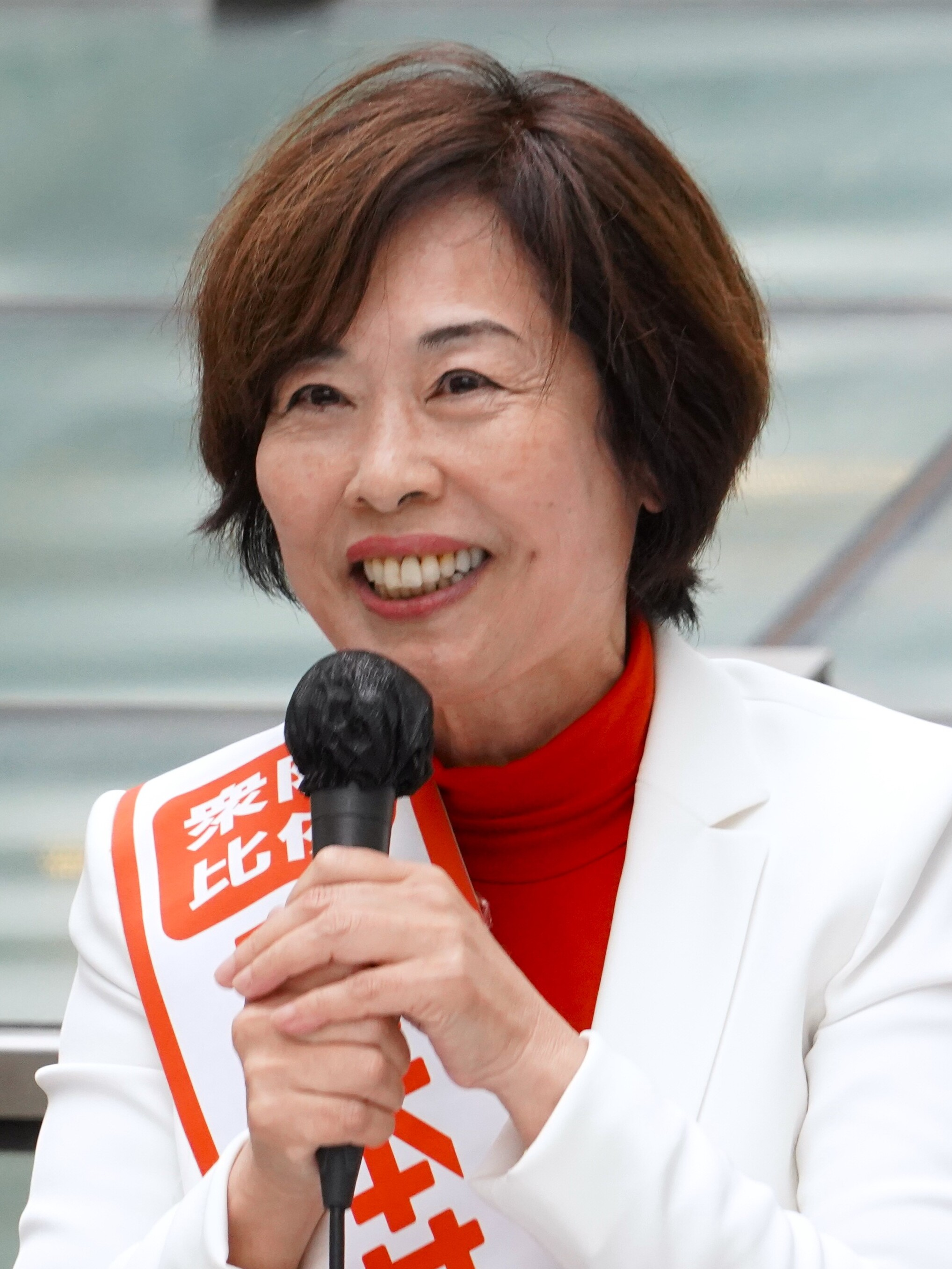
- Hatano in 2024

Member of the House of Representatives
- Incumbent
- Assumed office 8 February 2026
- Preceded by: Kazuo Shii
- Constituency: Southern Kanto PR
- In office 19 December 2014 – 14 October 2021
- Preceded by: Katsuhito Nakajima
- Succeeded by: Ryo Tagaya
- Constituency: Southern Kanto PR

Member of the House of Councillors
- In office 26 July 1998 – 25 July 2004
- Preceded by: Fumio Saito
- Succeeded by: Akio Koizumi
- Constituency: Kanagawa at-large

Personal details
- Born: Onishi Kimie; 19 January 1957 (age 69) Nakahara, Kawasaki, Japan
- Party: Communist
- Education: Yokohama National University (B.Ed.)

Kimie Hatano (Japanese: 畑野君枝, Hepburn: Hatano Kimie; born 28 January 1957, in Kawasaki, Kanagawa) is a member of the Japanese Communist Party who served in both the House of Representatives and the House of Councillors. In the House of Representatives, she represented the 10th District of Kanagawa prefecture, while in the House of Councillors she represented the second seat of the Kanagawa at-large district. Hatano is opposed to the Technical Intern Training Program, saying that the workers in the program are being subordinated. She is also opposed to the Trans-Pacific Partnership. Hatano supports having more classes available in the evenings at junior high schools and is opposed to stopping state grants to national universities, saying that tuition would increase dramatically.

== Early life ==
Hatano was born on 19 January 1957 in Nakahara Ward, Kawasaki City, Kanagawa Prefecture. She would eventually graduate from Kamimaruko Primary School, Kamanigaya Middle School and Midorigaoka High School. During high school, she wished to become a manga artist, so much so that she created a manga study group for that purpose. After leaving high school however, she went on to earn a Bachelor of Education from Yokohama National University. which she used to become a teacher in a number of high schools and junior high schools in Kanagawa Prefecture, as well as for a Junior High school in Ōta Ward, Tokyo.

== Political career ==
After being invited by former classmates from her high school who were supportive of the Japanese Communist Party, she began working as the chairman of the Kanagawa Prefectural Committee for the Democratic Youth League and around the same time joined the Communist Party.

In the 1995 House of Councillors election, she ran as a Communist Party candidate for the Kanagawa at-large district, but was unsuccessful coming in 6th place. In the 1998 House of Councillors election, she again ran for the Kanagawa district and won, in part thanks to a boom of support for the Communist Party and the fact that the conservative vote had been split among a number of different candidates. She is so far the on member of the Communist Party to have been elected to the Kanagawa district.

During her time in the House of Councillors, she was a member of the Committee on Education and Science, Accounting Committee, the National Life and Economic Survey Committee and was the vice-chairman of the National Diet Affairs Committee of the House of Councillors with the Communist Party.

She ran for re-election in the 2004 House of Councillors election for the Kanagawa district but was defeated, in part due to a decline in support for the Communist Party and in part due to the consolidation of the conservative vote around the candidate from the Liberal Democratic Party.

She ran in the 2005 By-election and in the 2007 election but was defeated both times.

== Election results ==
=== House of Councillor elections ===
2007
Party	Candidate	Votes	%	±%
LDP	Hiroe Makiyama	1,010,866	25.4	
LDP	Yutaka Kobayashi	895,752	22.5	
Democratic	Masaki Mito	781,533	19.7	
Komeito	Akira Mito	691,842	17.4	
JCP	Kimie Hatano	385,619	9.7	
Social Democratic	Shigeru Wada	128,757	3.2	
People's New	Sachiko Saito	61,219	1.5	
Ishin Seito Shimpu	Toshimori Mizoguchi	21,645	0.5	

2005 By-Election
Party	Candidate	Votes	%	±%
LDP	Yoriko Kawaguchi	1,150,868	50.2	
Democratic	Hiroe Makiyama	765,589	33.4	
JCP	Kimie Hatano	375,507	16.4	

2004
Party	Candidate	Votes	%	±%
LDP	Akio Koizumi	1,217,100	33.2	
Democratic	Keiichiro Asao (Incumbent)	856,504	23.4	
Democratic	Keiko Chiba (Incumbent)	843,759	23.0	
JCP	Kimie Hatano (Incumbent)	397,660	10.9	
Social Democratic	Keiko Ueda	254,943	7.0	
Independent	Hajime Manabe	71,170	1.9	
Ishin	Isao Kuwakubo	22,275	0.6	

1998
Party	Candidate	Votes	%	±%
Democratic	Keiichiro Asao	640,463	18.0	
JCP	Kimie Hatano	527,799	14.8	
Democratic	Keiko Chiba	510,371	14.3	
Independent	Marutei Tsurunen	502,712	14.1	
LDP	Fumio Saito	463,193	13.0	
Social Democratic	Tomoko Abe	298,244	8.4	
LDP	Isao Makishima	286,604	8.1	
Liberal	Takeshi Hidaka	241,189	6.8	
New Socialist	Yoshiko Bannai	27,335	0.8	
Youth Liberal Party	Katsuo Sato	19,567	0.6	
Green Communist Party	Kazunari Sugiuchi	14,842	0.4	
Sports & Peace	Takashi Hayashi	12,350	0.4	
Sports & Peace	Teruo Takano	10,272	0.3	
Ishin Seito Shimpu	Minoru Hashimoto	8,686	0.2	
Sports & Peace	Yoshien Waguri	2,149	0.1	

1995
Party	Candidate	Votes	%	±%
New Frontier	Akira Matsu	718,030	28.2	
LDP	Kiyoharu Ishiwata	466,457	18.3	
Socialist	Tsuyoshi Saito	371,889	14.6	
Independent	Marutei Tsurunen	339,484	13.3	
NP-Sakigake	Yoshimi Ishikawa	259,327	10.2	
JCP	Kimie Hatano	256,015	10.1	
Independent	Tadashi Kobayashi	56,491	2.2	
Party to Create a New Era	Mariko Miyazaki	25,901	1.0	
Japan Wellfare Party	Yukiko Matsuzaki	20,425	0.8	
Green Farming Coalition	Shingo Umezu	10,367	0.4	
Green Citizens and Farmers Union	Yutaka Otada	8,559	0.3	
Education Party	Yuko Ashina	5,749	0.2	
New Political Wind	Satoshi Yanagisawa	4,351	0.2	
World Johrekai	Masayuki Kanai	1,559	0.1	
