= Kanagawa at-large district =

Japan House of Councillors constituency

- 神奈川県選挙区
- Parliamentary constituency for the House of Councillors
- Prefecture: Kanagawa
- Electorate: 7,712,688 (as of July 2025)

Current constituency
- Created: 1947
- Seats: 8
- Councillors: Class of 2028: Junko Mihara (LDP); Shigefumi Matsuzawa (Ishin); Nobuhiro Miura (Komeito); Keiichiro Asao (LDP); Class of 2031: Hiroe Makiyama (CDP); Akihiro Kagoshima (DPFP); Masaaki Waki (LDP); Hiroki Hajikano (Sanseitō)

The Kanagawa at-large district (神奈川県選挙区, Kanagawa-ken senkyo-ku) is a constituency of the House of Councillors in the Diet of Japan (national legislature) represented by eight Councillors. It comprises the entire prefecture of Kanagawa and elects four Councillors every three years by single non-transferable vote.

Between 1947 and 1995 Kanagawa was represented by four Councillors. The 1994 electoral reform reapportioned the number of seats, increasing the number of Councillors in Miyagi, Saitama, Gifu, and Kanagawa by two each (one per election) and reducing the number in Hokkaido, Hyogo and Fukuoka. Kanagawa, like most two-member districts, had often split seats between the two major parties, the Liberal Democratic Party (LDP) and the Japan Socialist Party (JSP). Following another reapportionment in the 2007 election when Tokyo gained an additional Councillor, Kanagawa had the lowest electoral weight for the House of Councillors countrywide. This resulted in Tottori voters having five times more voting power than Kanagawa voters during the 2010 House of Councillors election. After a Supreme Court ruling on this election, the National Diet amended the Public Offices Election Law in November 2012 to add two seats to Kanagawa and Osaka each. However, this only reduced the largest vote disparity from five-fold to 4.77-fold (as of 2015).

As of July 2025, 7,712,688 voters were registered in Kanagawa.

== Councillors from Kanagawa ==
Class of (1947/1953/...)				Election	Class of (1950/1956/...)			
#1 1947: #1, 6 Year Term 1987: 2 Year Term	#2 1947: #2, 6 Year Term	#3 2005: #1, 2 Year Term	#4	Election	#1 1947: #3, 3 Year Term 1967: #1, 1 Year Term	#2 1947: #4, 3 Year Term 2009: #1, 1 Year Term	#3	#4
Jiro Miki (JSP)	Seiichi Ogushi (LP)			1947	Kenichi Suzuki (NCP)	Kenji Ōsumi (LP)		
Jiro Miki (JSP)	Seiichi Ogushi (LP)			1950	Eki Sone (JSP)	Kosaku Ishimura (Yoshida LP)		
Jiro Miki (JSP, Right)	Kenzō Kōno (Indep.)			1953	Eki Sone (JSP)	Kosaku Ishimura (Yoshida LP)		
Jiro Miki (JSP, Right)	Kenzō Kōno (Indep.)			1956	Eki Sone (JSP)	Shigeaki Aizawa (JSP)		
Kenzō Kōno (LDP)	Matsue Tagami (JSP)			1959	Eki Sone (JSP)	Shigeaki Aizawa (JSP)		
Kenzō Kōno (LDP)	Matsue Tagami (JSP)			1962	Eki Sone (JSP)	Shigeaki Aizawa (JSP)		
Saburo Oka (JSP)	Kenzō Kōno (LDP)			1965	Eki Sone (JSP)	Shigeaki Aizawa (JSP)		
Saburo Oka (JSP)	Kenzō Kōno (LDP)			1967 by-el.	Ichirō Satō (LDP)	Shigeaki Aizawa (JSP)		
Saburo Oka (JSP)	Kenzō Kōno (LDP)			1968	Ichirō Satō (LDP)	Shirō Takeda (JSP)		
Kenzō Kōno (LDP)	Katsuji Kataoka (JSP)			1971	Ichirō Satō (LDP)	Shirō Takeda (JSP)		
Kenzō Kōno (LDP)	Katsuji Kataoka (JSP)			1974	Shirō Takeda (JSP)	Akira Hatano (LDP)		
Kenzō Kōno (Indep.)	Katsuji Kataoka (JSP)			1977	Shirō Takeda (JSP)	Akira Hatano (LDP)		
Kenzō Kōno (Indep.)	Katsuji Kataoka (JSP)			1980	Akira Hatano (LDP)	Shirō Takeda (JSP)		
Shingo Hattori (New Komeito)	Tsuneo Sugimoto (LDP)			1983	Akira Hatano (LDP)	Shirō Takeda (JSP)		
Shingo Hattori (New Komeito)	Tsuneo Sugimoto (LDP)			1986	Fumio Saitō (LDP)	Keiko Chiba (JSP)		
Kenichiro Sato (LDP)	Tsuneo Sugimoto (LDP)			1987 by-el.	Fumio Saitō (LDP)	Keiko Chiba (JSP)		
Tadashi Kobayashi (JSP)	Kiyoharu Ishiwata (LDP)			1989	Fumio Saitō (LDP)	Keiko Chiba (JSP)		
Tadashi Kobayashi (JSP)	Kiyoharu Ishiwata (LDP)			1992	Fumio Saitō (LDP)	Keiko Chiba (JSP)		
Akira Matsu (NFP)	Kiyoharu Ishiwata (LDP)	Tsuyoshi Saito (JSP)		1995	Fumio Saitō (LDP)	Keiko Chiba (JSP)		
Akira Matsu (NFP)	Kiyoharu Ishiwata (LDP)	Tsuyoshi Saito (JSP)		1998	Keiichirō Asao (LDP)	Kimie Hatano (JCP)	Keiko Chiba (DPJ)	
Yutaka Kobayashi (LDP)	Akira Matsu (Komeito)	Tsuyoshi Saito (DPJ)		2001	Keiichirō Asao (LDP)	Kimie Hatano (JCP)	Keiko Chiba (DPJ)	
Yutaka Kobayashi (LDP)	Akira Matsu (Komeito)	Tsuyoshi Saito (DPJ)		2004	Akio Koizumi (LDP)	Keiichirō Asao (LDP)	Keiko Chiba (DPJ)	
Yutaka Kobayashi (LDP)	Akira Matsu (Komeito)	Yoriko Kawaguchi (LDP)		2005 by-el.	Akio Koizumi (LDP)	Keiichirō Asao (LDP)	Keiko Chiba (DPJ)	
Hiroe Makiyama (DPJ)	Yutaka Kobayashi (LDP) (Note: Yutaka Kobayashi was elected in July 2007 but resigned in September after it was found he had violated the electoral law. Fourth-placed Akira Matsu was awarded the seat as it had fallen vacant within three months of the election.)	Masashi Mito (DPJ)		2007	Akio Koizumi (LDP)	Keiichirō Asao (LDP)	Keiko Chiba (DPJ)	
Hiroe Makiyama (DPJ)	Akira Matsu (Komeito)	Masashi Mito (DPJ)		2007	Akio Koizumi (LDP)	Keiichirō Asao (LDP)	Keiko Chiba (DPJ)	
Hiroe Makiyama (DPJ)	Akira Matsu (Komeito)	Masashi Mito (DPJ)		2009 by-el.	Akio Koizumi (LDP)	Yōichi Kaneko (DPJ)	Keiko Chiba (DPJ)	
Hiroe Makiyama (DPJ)	Akira Matsu (Komeito)	Masashi Mito (DPJ)		2010	Akio Koizumi (LDP)	Kenji Nakanishi (Your Party)	Yōichi Kaneko (DPJ)	
Dai Shimamura (LDP)	Shigefumi Matsuzawa (Your Party)	Sayaka Sasaki (Komeito)	Hiroe Makiyama (DPJ)	2013	Akio Koizumi (LDP)	Kenji Nakanishi (Your Party)	Yōichi Kaneko (DPJ)	
Dai Shimamura (LDP)	Shigefumi Matsuzawa (Your Party)	Sayaka Sasaki (Komeito)	Hiroe Makiyama (DPJ)	2016	Junko Mihara (LDP)	Nobuhiro Miura (Komeito)	Yuichi Mayama (DPJ)	Kenji Nakanishi (Indep.)
Dai Shimamura (LDP)	Hiroe Makiyama (CDP)	Sayaka Sasaki (Komeito)	Shigefumi Matsuzawa (Nippon Ishin)	2019	Junko Mihara (LDP)	Nobuhiro Miura (Komeito)	Yuichi Mayama (DPJ)	Kenji Nakanishi (Indep.)
Dai Shimamura (LDP)	Hiroe Makiyama (CDP)	Sayaka Sasaki (Komeito)	Shigefumi Matsuzawa (Nippon Ishin)	2022 (with by-el.)	Junko Mihara (LDP)	Shigefumi Matsuzawa (Nippon Ishin)	Nobuhiro Miura (Komeito)	Keiichirō Asao (LDP)
Hiroe Makiyama (CDP)	Akihiro Kagoshima (DPFP)	Masaaki Waki (LDP)	Hiroki Hajikano (Sanseitō)	2025	Junko Mihara (LDP)	Shigefumi Matsuzawa (Nippon Ishin)	Nobuhiro Miura (Komeito)	Keiichirō Asao (LDP)

== Election results ==
=== Elections in the 2020s ===
2025: Kanagawa at-large 4 seats
Party	Candidate	Votes	%	±%
CDP	Hiroe Makiyama (Incumbent)	731,605	16.1	▼4.3
DPP	Akihiro Kagoshima	731,342	16.1	
LDP	Masaaki Waki	722,917	15.9	
Sanseitō	Hiroki Hajikano	577,085	12.7	
Komeito	Sayaka Sasaki (Incumbent) (endorsed by the LDP)	571,796	12.6	▼4.3
JCP	Yuka Asaka	285,221	6.3	▼5.3
Reiwa	Ryō Miyoshi	251,192	5.5	
Ishin	Shūhei Chiba	240,775	5.3	
Team Mirai	Michio Kawai	139,475	3.1	
Independent Alliance	Satoru Utsumi	129,978	2.9	
Social Democratic	Tokio Kaneko	53,153	1.2	
Anti-NHK	Keisuke Horikawa	34,300	0.8	
Independent	Rie Mishima	33,185	0.7	
Nippon Seishinkai	Hisashi Aya	23,756	0.5	
Japan Reform Party	Takahiro Hatakeyama	11,438	0.3	
Japan Reform Party	Goichi Sakuma	8,134	0.2	

2022: Kanagawa at-large 4 seats + 1 by-election
Party	Candidate	Votes	%	±%
LDP	Junko Mihara	807,390	19.7	
Ishin	Shigefumi Matsuzawa	605,248	14.8	
Komeito	Nobuhiro Miura (Incumbent) (endorsed by the LDP)	547,028	13.4	
LDP	Keiichiro Asao	544,597	13.3	
CDP	Motoko Mizuno (Note: Because Shigefumi Matsuzawa was also running to be Mayor of Yokohama, it was decided that the candidate in 5th place would take his seat should he win that election. He was defeated however and so retained his seat)	394,303	9.6	
JCP	Yuka Asaka	354,456	8.7	
DPP	Jesús Fukasaku	253,234	6.2	
CDP	Yuusuke Terasaki	210,016	5.1	
Sanseitō	Akiko Fujimura	120,471	2.9	
Social Democratic	Yoichi Utsumi	49,787	1.2	
Anti-NHK	Yuhei Jukuroki	25,784	0.6	
Independent	Megumi Akita	24,389	0.6	
Ganbare Nippon	Gulistan Ezuzu	22,043	0.5	
Anti-NHK	Hiroyuki Hashimoto	19,920	0.5	
Ishin	Daisuke Hariya	19,867	0.5	
Independent	Ayumi Fujisawa	19,155	0.5	
Anti-NHK	Towako Iida	17,609	0.4	
Republican Party	Nobuhiko Suto	13,904	0.3	
Anti-NHK	Kiyohito Onozuka	11,623	0.3	
Happiness Realization	Aiko Iki	11,073	0.3	
Party to Realize Bright Japan with a Female Emperor	Kei Kubota	10,628	0.3	
Japan First	Ayumi Hagiyama	8,099	0.2	

=== Elections in the 2010s ===
2019
Party	Candidate	Votes	%	±%
LDP	Dai Shimamura (Incumbent)	917,058	25.2	
CDP	Hiroe Makiyama	742,658	20.4	
Komeito	Sayaka Sasaki (Incumbent) (endorsed by the LDP)	615,417	16.9	
Ishin	Shigefumi Matsuzawa	575,884	15.8	
JCP	Yuka Asaka	422,603	11.6	
DPP	Ryosuke Nogi	126,672	3.5	
Anti-NHK	Daisuke Hayashi	79,208	2.2	
Social Democratic	Rinko Aihara	61,709	1.7	
Independent	Masakatsu Morishita	22,057	0.6	
Happiness Realization	Aiko Iki	21,755	0.6	
Assembly to Consider Euthanasia	Tomoyuki Kato	21,598	0.6	
Olive Tree Party	Taishi Enomoto	17,170	0.5	
Independent	Mitsugi Shibuya	11,185	0.3	
Workers Party Aiming for Liberation of Labour	Takuyuki Akutsu	8,514	0.2	

2016
Party	Candidate	Votes	%	±%
LDP	Junko Mihara	1,004,877	24.5	
Komeito	Nobuhiro Miura (Endorsed by LDP)	628,582	15.3	
Democratic	Yuichi Mayama (Endorsed by the Liberal Party)	582,127	14.2	
Independent	Kenji Nakanishi (Endorsed by the LDP)	524,070	12.8	
JCP	Yuka Asaka	487,729	11.9	
Democratic	Yoichi Kaneko	448,954	10.9	
Ishin	Dai Niwa	218,853	5.3	
Social Democratic	Hideo Mori(Endorsed by the Japan)	76,424	1.9	
Japanese Kokoro	Taichi Shimizu	50,256	1.2	
Independent	Masanori Sato	32,113	0.8	
Shiji Seitō Nashi	Eiji Katano	25,714	0.6	
Happiness Realization	Aiko Iki	21,611	0.5	

2013
Party	Candidate	Votes	%	±%
LDP	Dai Shimamura	1,130,652	28.8	
Your	Shigefumi Matsuzawa	740,207	18.8	
Komeito	Sayaka Sasaki	629,662	16.0	
Democratic	Hiroe Makiyama	461,006	11.7	
JCP	Kimie Hatano	444,955	11.3	
Ishin	Masashi Mito	242,462	6.2	
Greens	Junichi Tsuyuki	119,633	3.0	
Social Democratic	Eiko Kimura	76,792	2.0	
Ishin Seito Shimpu	Toshimori Mizoguchi	41,359	1.1	
Independent	Masakatsu Morishita	30,403	0.8	
Happiness Realization	Yukihisa Oikawa	10,006	0.3	

2010
Party	Candidate	Votes	%	±%
LDP	Akio Koizumi (Incumbent)	982,220	25.2	
Your	Kenji Nakanishi	788,729	20.2	
Democratic	Youichi Kaneko	745,143	19.1	
Democratic	Keiko Chiba (Incumbent)	696,739	17.9	
JCP	Kimie Hatano	304,059	7.8	
Social Democratic	Eiko Kimura	113,712	2.9	
New Renaissance	Takahito Kai	113,453	2.9	
Sunrise	Manabu Matsuda	93,437	2.4	
Independent	Seiichi Yamamoto	47,776	1.2	
Happiness Realization	Bunko Kato	13,459	0.4	

=== Elections in the 2000s ===
2009 By-Election
Party	Candidate	Votes	%	±%
Democratic	Yoichi Kaneko	1,010,180	49.1	
LDP	Hiroko Tsunoda	792,634	38.513	
JCP	Masahiko Okada	230,143	11.2	
Happiness Realization	Bunko Kato	24,793	1.2	

2007
Party	Candidate	Votes	%	±%
LDP	Hiroe Makiyama	1,010,866	25.4	
LDP	Yutaka Kobayashi	895,752	22.5	
Democratic	Masaki Mito	781,533	19.7	
Komeito	Akira Mito	691,842	17.4	
JCP	Kimie Hatano	385,619	9.7	
Social Democratic	Shigeru Wada	128,757	3.2	
People's New	Sachiko Saito	61,219	1.5	
Ishin Seito Shimpu	Toshimori Mizoguchi	21,645	0.5	

2005 By-Election
Party	Candidate	Votes	%	±%
LDP	Yoriko Kawaguchi	1,150,868	50.2	
Democratic	Hiroe Makiyama	765,589	33.4	
JCP	Kimie Hatano	375,507	16.4	

2004
Party	Candidate	Votes	%	±%
LDP	Akio Koizumi	1,217,100	33.2	
Democratic	Keiichiro Asao (Incumbent)	856,504	23.4	
Democratic	Keiko Chiba (Incumbent)	843,759	23.0	
JCP	Kimie Hatano (Incumbent)	397,660	10.9	
Social Democratic	Keiko Ueda	254,943	7.0	
Independent	Hajime Manabe	71,170	1.9	
Ishin	Isao Kuwakubo	22,275	0.6	

=== Elections in the 1990s ===
1998
Party	Candidate	Votes	%	±%
Democratic	Keiichiro Asao	640,463	18.0	
JCP	Kimie Hatano	527,799	14.8	
Democratic	Keiko Chiba	510,371	14.3	
Independent	Marutei Tsurunen	502,712	14.1	
LDP	Fumio Saito	463,193	13.0	
Social Democratic	Tomoko Abe	298,244	8.4	
LDP	Isao Makishima	286,604	8.1	
Liberal	Takeshi Hidaka	241,189	6.8	
New Socialist	Yoshiko Bannai	27,335	0.8	
Youth Liberal Party	Katsuo Sato	19,567	0.6	
Green Communist Party	Kazunari Sugiuchi	14,842	0.4	
Sports & Peace	Takashi Hayashi	12,350	0.4	
Sports & Peace	Teruo Takano	10,272	0.3	
Ishin Seito Shimpu	Minoru Hashimoto	8,686	0.2	
Sports & Peace	Yoshien Waguri	2,149	0.1	

1995
Party	Candidate	Votes	%	±%
New Frontier	Akira Matsu	718,030	28.2	
LDP	Kiyoharu Ishiwata	466,457	18.3	
Socialist	Tsuyoshi Saito	371,889	14.6	
Independent	Marutei Tsurunen	339,484	13.3	
NP-Sakigake	Yoshimi Ishikawa	259,327	10.2	
JCP	Kimie Hatano	256,015	10.1	
Independent	Tadashi Kobayashi	56,491	2.2	
Party to Create a New Era	Mariko Miyazaki	25,901	1.0	
Japan Wellfare Party	Yukiko Matsuzaki	20,425	0.8	
Green Farming Coalition	Shingo Umezu	10,367	0.4	
Green Citizens and Farmers Union	Yutaka Otada	8,559	0.3	
Education Party	Yuko Ashina	5,749	0.2	
New Political Wind	Satoshi Yanagisawa	4,351	0.2	
World Johrekai	Masayuki Kanai	1,559	0.1	

1992
Party	Candidate	Votes	%	±%
LDP	Fumio Saito (Incumbent)	753,852	30.6	
Socialist	Keiko Chiba (Incumbent)	693,301	28.1	
Social Democratic	Hisako Oishi	370,280	15.0	
Progressive Party	Masaya Maruyama	348,264	14.1	
JCP	Takeshi Omori	218,175	8.9	
Small Business Life Party	Haruka Oka	18,331	0.7	
Japanese Social Reform Party	Takusen Fukuda	8,473	0.3	
Japanese Social Reform Party	Hideaki Horiuchi	8,073	0.3	
Earth Restoration Party	Hideo Shirane	7,579	0.3	
Cultural Forum	Kotaro Yamazaki	5,874	0.2	
Cultural Forum	Norio Okamoto	5,043	0.2	
Taikosha Political Federation	Kohei Ogo	3,058	0.1	

=== Elections in the 1980s ===
1989
Party	Candidate	Votes	%	±%
Socialist	Tadashi Kobayashi	1,175,262	36.2	
LDP	Kiyomoto Ishiwata	673,544	20.8	
Progressive Party	Masaya Maruyama	604,505	18.6	
Democratic Socialist	Hisako Oishi	388,808	12.0	
JCP	Takeshi Omori	240,359	7.4	
Independent	Daisuke Yagi	79,957	2.5	
Green Party (Japan, 1981)	Hideko Araki	34,597	1.1	
MPD, Peace and Democracy Movement	Yoshihisa Abe	24,711	0.8	
Environmental Party	Mizuhiko Matsubara	8,691	0.3	
Education Party	Shoji Sasaoka	7,858	0.2	
Nihon Seinensha	Kinya Hamamoto	3,372	0.1	
Kikumori Youth League	Toranosuke Sato	2,543	0.1	
Japan National Defense League	Hiroshi Kunno	1,856	0.1	

1987 By-Election
Party	Candidate	Votes	%	±%
LDP	Kenichiro Sato	483,582	46.0	
Socialist	Mitsuji Morohoshi	365,517	34.8	
JCP	Tokisho Saito	190,989	18.2	
Japanese Social Reform Party	Kusuo Shigematsu	10,563	1.0	

1986
Party	Candidate	Votes	%	±%
LDP	Fumio Saito	806,159	26.2	
Socialist	Keiko Chiba	777,298	25.2	
Democratic Socialist	Masuo Uotani	568,382	18.4	
Independent	Takeo Kono	514,155	16.7	
JCP	Kyohei Okamura	325,733	10.6	
Education Party	Shoji Sasaoka	14,392	0.5	
Japan Green Union	Shigeki Mitsunaga	13,078	0.4	
Environmental Party	Masao Idei	12,351	0.4	
Socialist Workers Party	Shuji Irahara	12,239	0.4	
Japanese Social Reform Party	Masanori Hiraishi	10,639	0.4	
Environmental Party	Hisae Yamazaki	9,889	0.3	
Japanese Social Reform Party	Kiyo Shigematsu	7,915	0.3	
Republican Party	Sakuo Kato	5,965	0.2	
Republican Party	Mitsugu Oba	4,064	0.1	

1983
Party	Candidate	Votes	%	±%
Komeito	Shingo Hattori	688,049	26.7	
LDP	Tsuneo Sugimoto	529,445	20.5	
Independent	Takeo Kono	508,767	19.7	
Socialist	Katsuji Kataoka	477,919	18.5	
JCP	Hatsue Koizumi	301,459	11.7	
Katteren to expel Takusen Fukuda from the Political World	Tomie Ono	26,422	1.0	
Education Party	Michiyo Sato	11,488	0.4	
Education Party	Sadami Takahashi	7,655	0.3	
Independent	Morikazu Makino	7,241	0.3	
Japanese Social Reform Party	Kou Matsunaga	6,337	0.3	
Japanese Social Reform Party	Toshio Shirane	4,140	0.2	
Independent	Kazuo Minoura	3,940	0.2	
Mob Party	Michiko Ito	3,908	0.2	
Mob Party	Kato Minae	3,179	0.1	
Japan National Political Union	Seino Bungoro	1,877	0.1	

1980
Party	Candidate	Votes	%	±%
LDP	Hatano Akira	902,170	28.6	
Socialist	Shiro Takeda	692,100	22.0	
Democratic Socialist	Hironaga Keitaro	664,167	21.1	
JCP	Hatsue Koizumi	462,753	14.7	
New Liberal Club	Hiroshi Onishi	349,989	11.1	
Social Democratic	Hiroshi Nomura	28,765	0.9	
Marxist Workers Union	Tamio Hagiwara	23,670	0.8	
Independent	Kaname Nakaoka	20,262	0.6	
Democratic Association of Japan	Yoshikawa Ason	6,628	0.2	

=== Elections in the 1970s ===
1977
Party	Candidate	Votes	%	±%
Independent	Kenzō Kōno	1,086,512	41.3	
Socialist	Kataoka Katsuji	593,009	22.6	
Independent	Hironaga Keitaro	518,272	19.7	
JCP	Hatsue Koizumi	344,239	13.1	
Japan Labour Party	Kenzo Tokita	40,917	1.6	
Independent	Kaname Nakaoka	25,886	1.0	
Marxist Workers Union	Hiroyoshi Hayashi	20,813	0.8	

1974
Party	Candidate	Votes	%	±%
Socialist	Shiro Takeda	814,098	28.7	
LDP	Hatano Akira	736,016	25.9	
Kōmeitō	Takeshi Kusano	508,762	17.9	
Independent	Keinosuke Suyama (Endorsed by the JCP)	417,549	14.7	
Democratic Socialist	Takamochi Takahashi	336,241	11.8	
Independent	Kaname Nakaoka	17,025	0.6	
Independent	Kiyotoku Fukuda	11,137	0.4	

1971
Party	Candidate	Votes	%	±%
LDP	Kenzō Kōno	795,799	42.7	
Socialist	Kataoka Katsuji	695,402	37.3	
JCP	Masahiro Nakaji	370,941	19.9	

=== Elections in the 1960s ===
1968
Party	Candidate	Votes	%	±%
LDP	Ichiro Sato	721,102	37.9	
Socialist	Shiro Takeda	666,039	35.0	
Democratic Socialist	Kazuma Sato	329,627	17.3	
JCP	Masahiro Nakaji	184,210	9.7	

1967 By-Election
Party	Candidate	Votes	%	±%
LDP	Ichiro Sato	318,002	45.7	
Socialist	Kataoka Katsuji	304,392	43.8	
JCP	Masahiro Nakaji	58,313	8.4	
Independent	Umeshige Yamagishi	14,686	2.1	

1965
Party	Candidate	Votes	%	±%
Socialist	Saburo Oka	522,094	34.7	
LDP	Kenzō Kōno	519,027	34.5	
Democratic Socialist	Shunsuke Kaneko	257,352	17.1	
JCP	Shuji Sasaki	94,506	6.3	
Independent	Sadao Ishii	92,316	6.1	
Parliamentary Politics Advocacy National Alliance	Seijiro Fukasaku	10,298	0.7	
Independent	Saichi Nojima	9,142	0.6	

1962
Party	Candidate	Votes	%	±%
Democratic Socialist	Eki Sone	442,468	32.8	
Socialist	Shigeaki Aizawa	437,708	32.4	
LDP	Shoji Matsuoka	401,842	29.8	
JCP	Matsushima Matsutaro	68,031	5.0	

=== Elections in the 1950s ===
1959
Party	Candidate	Votes	%	±%
LDP	Kenzō Kōno	364,120	38.9	
Socialist	Matsue Tagami	342,542	36.6	
Independent	Kitaro Kato	111,902	12.0	
Independent	Makichi Horiuchi	58,490	6.3	
JCP	Matsushima Matsutaro	54,416	5.8	
Human Political League	Yoshizo Ito	4,721	0.5	

1956
Party	Candidate	Votes	%	±%
Socialist	Eki Masu (Incumbent)	190,673	23.0	
Socialist	Shigeaki Aizawa	190.673	23.0	
LDP	Tokio Nagayama	176,810	21.3	
LDP	Kosaku Ishimura	175,352	21.1	
JCP	Isao Nakanishi	45,945	5.5	

1953
Party	Candidate	Votes	%	±%
Right Socialist	Jiro Miki	172,093	22.1	
Independent	Kenzō Kōno	164,324	21.1	
Liberal	Yozo Nagai	150,212	19.3	
Kaishintō	Sei Yoshida	137,302	17.6	
Left Socialist	Shigeaki Aizawa	115,604	14.8	
JCP	Kazuo Okazaki	40,561	5.2	

1950
Party	Candidate	Votes	%	±%
Socialist	Eki Sone	252,305	31.3	
Liberal	Kosaku Ishimaru	263,284	20.3	
Liberal	Seisaku Ishiwata	134,346	16.7	
National Democratic	Sadao Nishimura	96,756	12.0	
JCP	Kazuo Okazaki	88,369	11.0	
Independent	Tozaburo Kogure	53,258	6.6	
Independent	Matsuo Biaogo	16,778	2.1	

=== Elections in the 1940s ===
1947
Party	Candidate	Votes	%	±%
Socialist	Jiro Miki	174,914	30.7	
Liberal	Seichi Ogushi	106,689	18.8	
National Cooperative	Kenichi Suzuki	102,075	17.9	
Liberal	Kenji Osumi	56,445	9.9	
Democratic	Sadao Nishimura	49,237	8.7	
JCP	Kazuo Okazaki	29,824	5.2	
Democratic	Yasuzol Numata	24,483.	4.3	
Independent	Takashige Matsuyama	21,925	3.9	
Democratic People's League	Yutaka Sanbu	3,395	0.6	
