= Keiko Chiba =

Japanese politician (born 1948)

- 千葉 景子
- Official portrait, 2005

Minister of Justice
- In office 16 September 2009 – 17 September 2010
- Prime Minister: Yukio Hatoyama; Naoto Kan
- Preceded by: Eisuke Mori
- Succeeded by: Minoru Yanagida

Member of the House of Councillors
- In office 8 July 1986 – 25 July 2010
- Preceded by: Shirō Takeda
- Succeeded by: Yōichi Kaneko
- Constituency: Kanagawa at-large

Personal details
- Born: 11 May 1948 (age 78) Yokohama, Kanagawa, Japan
- Party: Democratic (1998–2016)
- Other political affiliations: JSP (1986–1996); SDP (1996–1997); DP 1996 (1997–1998); DP 2016 (2016–2018)
- Education: Chuo University
- Profession: Lawyer

Keiko Chiba (千葉 景子, Chiba Keiko; born 11 May 1948) is a former justice minister of Japan.

== Former career ==
After graduating from Chuo University in 1971, where she studied law, she became a lawyer in 1982. She belongs to the Yokohama Bar Association. As a lawyer, she was involved in a lawsuit filed by local residents over noise pollution caused by jets taking off and landing at the U.S. Naval Air Facility Atsugi in Kanagawa Prefecture. She also worked to protect the rights of women and seniors.

== Political career ==
Throughout her activity as lawyer, Chiba developed a relationship with Japan Socialist Party. In 1986 she was nominated as the official candidate of the party and elected to the House of Councillors for the first time. She held executive posts in the Japan Socialist Party and in its successor the Social Democratic Party, but she left the party to the Democratic Party of Japan in January 1997. Nevertheless, she strengthened her footing with continuous support by All-Japan Prefectural and Municipal Workers' Union (JICHIRO) and Japanese Trade Union Confederation and took charge of the Director General of a parliament group supporting Amnesty International.

At the 20th House of Councillors election Chiba ran for the Diet representing Kanagawa and was elected to the House of Councillors for the fourth time. In the course of election canvassing, two executives of the Kawasaki Municipal Transportation Workers Union were arrested because of their involvement in soliciting votes for Chiba for cash payment. Both executives were sentenced to 1.5 years imprisonment with 5 years suspension execution. In the Next Cabinet Chiba served as Minister of State for Gender Equiality and as Minister of Justice.

After the 45th general election, she was appointed Minister of Justice in Yukio Hatoyama's cabinet on 16 September 2009. On 9 October 2009 Chiba granted special permission to two Chinese sisters who lost a lawsuit against a government deportation order. She later enacted legislation to abolish the statute of limitations for murder and robbery-murder.

She is a prominent member of various anti-death penalty organizations in Japan. Chiba expressed her intention to give "warm treatment" to illegal immigrants in Japan, and she has also reportedly said that all illegal immigrants in Japan should be allowed to stay in Japan without any legal documentation.

Chiba was reappointed as justice minister in the cabinet of Prime Minister Naoto Kan in June 2010.

Chiba lost her seat in the House of Councillors on 11 July 2010, but Prime Minister Naoto Kan had kept her as the Minister of Justice until September. Her successor to the position was Minoru Yanagida, who was appointed by Prime Minister Kan.

== Activities ==
- In 1989, Chiba, Naoto Kan, Takako Doi, Tomiichi Murayama and another 129 Japanese politicians from the Japan Socialist Party, Socialist Democratic Federation and Komeito signed a petition to the South Korean President Roh Tae-woo for the release of former death row inmate including Sin Gwang-su who had kidnapped a Japanese citizen in June 1980. After Kim Jong-Il admitted to abducting 13 Japanese citizens and issued an oral apology on 17 September 2002, Chiba was personally criticized by then Deputy Chief Cabinet Secretary Shinzo Abe, who called her "an idiot". During a meeting of the Budget Committee of the Lower house of the Diet held on 5 November 2009, Tomomi Inada confronted Chiba on the petition issue and Chiba replied to Inada that she had not realized that the list of the release petition included a criminal like Sin Gwang-su.
- On 5 August 1999 Chiba voted against the Law Regarding the National Flag and National Anthem.
- On 7 April 2004 at the Diet Chiba criticized the Reporting System for Illegal Aliens of the Immigration Bureau.
- In November 2006 Chiba became the promoter of a movement requesting the withdrawal of an Iranian's deportation sentence by the Immigrant Bureau.
- On 15 August 2008 Chiba participated in and made a speech at the ceremony held by Mindan celebrating the 63rd Gwangbokjeol.
- On 16 August 2008 Chiba assented to the political assembly held by Mindan supporting the non-citizen voting rights.
- On 4 December 2008 at the House of Councillors, Committee on Judicial Affairs, Chiba oppressed the speech of Kazuya Maruyama, a member of the Liberal Democratic Party concerning the amendment on the part of the Japanese Nationality Act.
- On 17 March 2009 at the Diet Chiba requested from then Minister of Justice Eisuke Mori not to deport a family that had illegally entered Japan by means of false-name passports, which amounted to a request for special treatment for these immigrants.
- On 21 September 2009 at "TV Tuckle" by TV Asahi Chiba expressed her intention to exercise her authority so as to prevent the runaway of public prosecutors.
- In July 2010, Chiba signed execution orders for convicted murderers Kazuo Shinozawa and Hidenori Ogata, then attended their executions by hanging on 28 July 2010. Chiba was the first justice minister in Japan's history to personally witness an execution.

== Manifesto ==
- To oppose the use of Yokosuka as a home port for nuclear-powered aircraft carriers of the United States Navy
- Advocates moving the night landing practices from the naval air facility at Atsugi to one in Iwo Jima.
- To set up the Civil Liberties Commission independent from the government.
- To realize a society in which symbiotic relationships between naturalized citizens and foreign residents is possible.

== Policies ==
- She supports non-citizen voting rights.
- She supports Multiple citizenship.
- She supports the amendment of the Japanese nationality Act.
- She supports the dual-surname system.
- She supports the Human Rights Protection Bill.

== Honours ==
- Grand Cordon of the Order of the Rising Sun (2018)

House of Councillors
Preceded by Akira Hatano	Councillor for Kanagawa's at-large district 1986–2010; Served alongside: Fumio Saito, Keiichiro Asao, Kimie Hatano, Akio Koizumi, Yoichi Kaneko	Succeeded by Akio Koizumi
Preceded by Shiro Takeda	Councillor for Kanagawa's at-large district 1986–2010; Served alongside: Fumio Saito, Keiichiro Asao, Kimie Hatano, Akio Koizumi, Yoichi Kaneko	Succeeded by Kenji Nakanishi
Preceded by Shiro Takeda	Councillor for Kanagawa's at-large district 1986–2010; Served alongside: Fumio Saito, Keiichiro Asao, Kimie Hatano, Akio Koizumi, Yoichi Kaneko	Succeeded by Yoichi Kaneko
Political offices
Preceded by Eisuke Mori	Minister of Justice; 2009–2010	Succeeded by Minoru Yanagida
