= Akio Koizumi =

Japanese politician

- 小泉 昭男
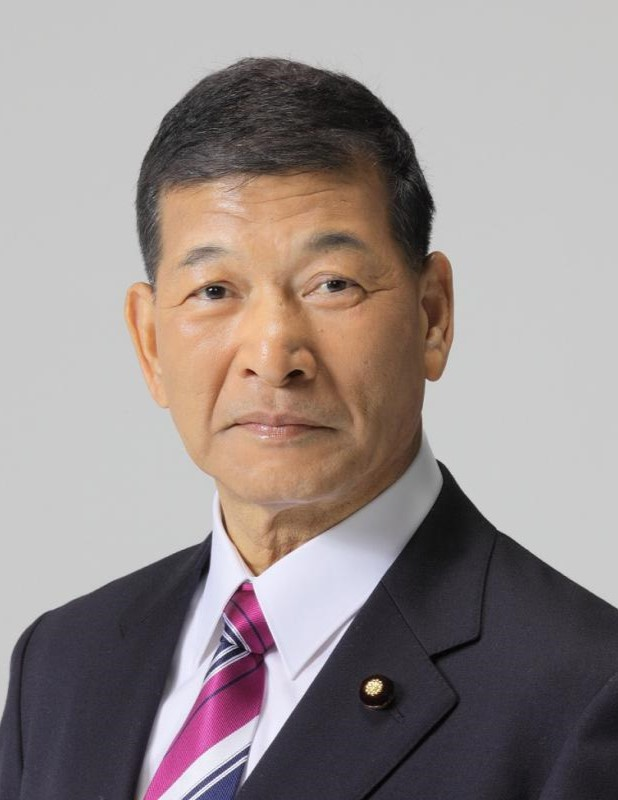
- Official portrait, 2014

Member of the House of Councillors
- In office 26 July 2004 – 25 July 2016
- Preceded by: Kimie Hatano
- Succeeded by: Junko Mihara
- Constituency: Kanagawa at-large

Member of the Kawasaki City Council
- In office 1987–2004
- Constituency: Miyamae Ward

Personal details
- Born: 6 October 1945 (age 80) Kawasaki, Kanagawa, Japan
- Party: Liberal Democratic
- Children: 3
- Education: Tokyo Metropolitan Engei Senior High School

Akio Koizumi (小泉 昭男, Koizumi Akio; born October 6, 1945) is a Japanese politician of the Liberal Democratic Party, a member of the House of Councillors in the Diet. A native of Kawasaki, Kanagawa, he was elected to the House of Councillors for the first time in 2004 after serving in the city assembly of Kawasaki.

House of Councillors
Preceded by Keiichiro Asao; Kimie Hatano; Keiko Chiba	Councillor for Kanagawa's At-large district 2004– Served alongside: Keiichiro Asao, Keiko Chiba, Yoichi Kaneko	Incumbent
