= Akira Hatano =

Japanese politician

- 秦野 章
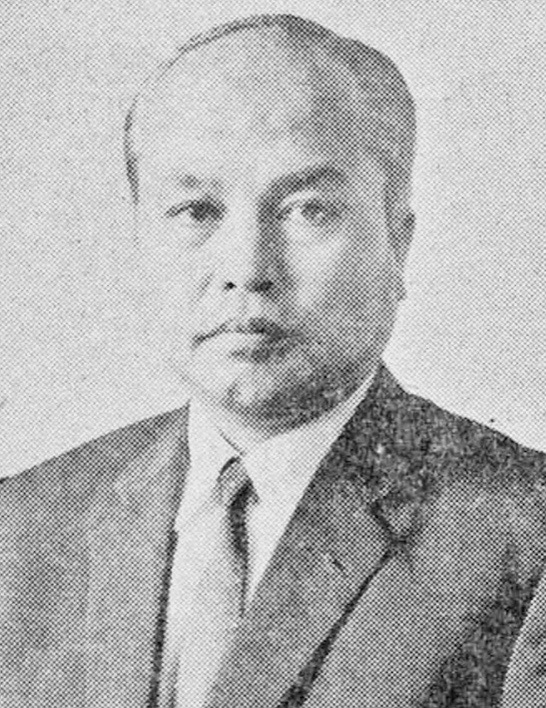
- Hatano in 1967

Minister of Justice
- In office 27 November 1982 – 27 December 1983
- Prime Minister: Yasuhiro Nakasone
- Preceded by: Michita Sakata
- Succeeded by: Eisaku Sumi

Member of the House of Councillors
- In office 8 July 1974 – 7 July 1986
- Preceded by: Ichirō Satō
- Succeeded by: Fumio Saitō
- Constituency: Kanagawa at-large

Personal details
- Born: 10 October 1911 Fujisawa, Kanagawa, Japan
- Died: 6 November 2002 (aged 91)
- Party: Liberal Democratic
- Education: Nihon University

Akira Hatano (秦野 章, Hatano Akira; 10 October 1911 – 6 November 2002) was Japanese politician who served as a Minister of Justice from 1982 to 1983, under Prime Minister Yasuhiro Nakasone. He served in the House of Councillors from 1974 to 1986.

Hatano was born in Fujisawa, Kanagawa. Before entering politics he was a police officer, serving as security chief of the Tokyo Metropolitan Police Department, and as the department's superintendent general from 1967 to 1970. Hatano ran for Governor of Tokyo in 1971, but he was defeated by incumbent Governor Ryokichi Minobe. Hatano became Minister of Justice in 1982, in the administration of Yasuhiro Nakasone. He was known to be a friend of former prime minister Kakuei Tanaka. Hatano made headlines in the Western press by announcing that Japan sent a secret envoy to Iran and Syria in 1985, for hostage negotiations.

Political offices
Preceded by Michita Sakata	Minister of Justice of Japan; 1982–1983	Succeeded by Eisaku Sumi
House of Councillors
Preceded by Ichirō Satō; Shirō Takeda	Councillor for Kanagawa's At-large district 1974–1986; Served alongside: Shirō Takeda	Succeeded by Fumio Saitō; Keiko Chiba
