= Kagoshima (disambiguation) =

Kagoshima is a city in Japan.

Kagoshima may also refer to:

== Places ==
- Kagoshima Airport, an airport in Kagoshima Prefecture
- Kagoshima Prefecture, a prefecture of Japan (Kagoshima City is the capital of this prefecture)
- Kagoshima Station, a station in Kagoshima City
- Satsuma Domain, a historical region in Japan, also known as Kagoshima

== People ==
- Akihiro Kagoshima (籠島 彰宏; born 1988), Japanese politician

== Sports ==
- Kagoshima Rebnise, Japanese professional basketball team located in Kagoshima
- Kagoshima United FC, Japanese professional football club based in Kagoshima

== See also ==
- 4703 Kagoshima, a minor planet, also called 1988 BL
