= Kazufumi Taniguchi =

Japanese politician

- 谷口 和史
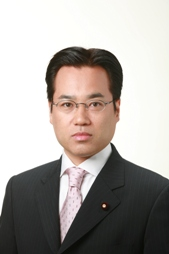

Member of the Kanagawa Prefectural Assembly
- Incumbent
- Assumed office 2011
- Constituency: Yamato City

Member of the House of Representatives
- In office 11 September 2005 – 21 July 2009
- Preceded by: Nobuo Kawakami
- Succeeded by: Keiichiro Asao
- Constituency: Southern Kanto PR

Personal details
- Born: 14 April 1962 (age 64) Kainan, Wakayama, Japan
- Party: Komeito
- Education: Sōka University

Kazufumi Taniguchi (谷口 和史, Taniguchi Kazufumi; born 14 April 1962) is a Japanese politician serving in the House of Representatives in the Diet (national legislature) as a member of the New Komeito Party. A native of Wakayama Prefecture and graduate of Soka University he was elected for the first time in 2005.
