= Sayaka Sasaki (politician) =

Japanese politician (born 1981)

- 佐々木 さやか
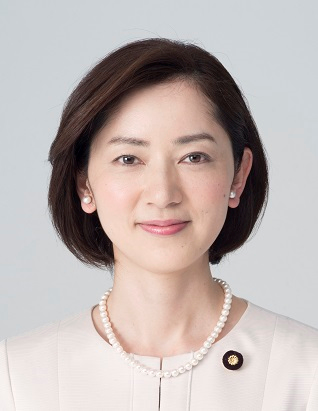
- Official portrait, 2019

Member of the House of Councillors
- In office 29 July 2013 – 28 July 2025
- Preceded by: Akira Matsu
- Succeeded by: Akihiro Kagoshima
- Constituency: Kanagawa at-large

Personal details
- Born: 18 January 1981 (age 45) Hachinohe, Aomori, Japan
- Party: Komeito
- Education: Sōka University; Carleton University

Sayaka Sasaki (born 18 January 1981) is a Japanese politician who was a member of the House of Councillors of Japan from 2013 to 2025.

== Biography ==
Sasaki was born in 1981 in Hachinohe and studied at Sōka University Graduate School of Law, and briefly attended Carleton University. She was elected in 2013 and 2019, representing Kanagawa at-large district, until her defeat in 2025.
