= Kenzō Kōno =

Japanese politician (1901–1983)

- 河野 謙三
- Kōno in 1953

President of the House of Councillors
- In office 17 July 1971 – 3 July 1977
- Monarch: Hirohito
- Vice President: Yasoichi Mori; Kazuo Maeda
- Preceded by: Yūzō Shigemune
- Succeeded by: Ken Yasui

Vice President of the House of Councillors
- In office 30 July 1965 – 3 August 1968
- President: Yūzō Shigemune
- Preceded by: Yōtoku Shigemasa
- Succeeded by: Ken Yasui

Member of the House of Councillors
- In office 3 May 1953 – 9 July 1983
- Preceded by: Seiichi Ogushi
- Succeeded by: Tsuneo Sugimoto
- Constituency: Kanagawa at-large

Member of the House of Representatives
- In office 24 January 1949 – 28 August 1952
- Preceded by: Toshio Hagiwara
- Succeeded by: Ichirō Kōno
- Constituency: Kanagawa 3rd

Personal details
- Born: 14 May 1901 Odawara, Kanagawa, Japan
- Died: 16 October 1983 (aged 82)
- Party: Liberal Democratic
- Other political affiliations: DLP (1948–1950); LP (1950–1953); Ryokufūkai (1953–1958)
- Relatives: Ichirō Kōno (brother); Yōhei Kōno (nephew); Taro Kono (great-nephew)
- Education: Waseda University

Kenzō Kōno (河野 謙三, Kōno Kenzō; 14 May 1901 – 16 October 1983) was a Japanese politician who served as President of the House of Councillors (1971–1977) and President of the Japan Association of Athletics Federations (1965–1975).

== Biography ==
Kōno was born on 14 May 1901. Belonging to a political dynasty, he was the younger brother of his predecessor, Ichirō Kōno and the uncle of Yōhei Kōno (Ichiro's son); Tarō Kōno is his great-nephew. He graduated from the Waseda University. In his youth he was a long-distance runner and won stages of the Hakone Ekiden in 1921 and 1922.

In his political career, he was the president of the House of Councillors from 17 July 1971 to 3 July 1977, was elected five times as a member of the House of Councillors for Kanagawa Prefecture between 1953 and 1983, and was a Member of the House of Representatives for Kanagawa's third district from 24 January 1949 to 28 August 1952.

House of Councillors
Preceded by Masataka Toyota	Chairman of the Finance Committee; 1958	Succeeded by Hisakichi Maeda
Preceded by Tōnosuke Ōtani	Chairman of the Cabinet Affairs Committee; 1962	Succeeded by Michio Murayama
Preceded by Yōtoku Shigemasa	Vice-President of the House of Councillors of Japan; 1965–1968	Succeeded by Ken Yasui
Preceded by Yūzō Shigemune	President of the House of Councillors of Japan; 1971–1977	Succeeded by Ken Yasui
Sporting positions
Preceded by Ichirō Kōno	President of the Japan Association of Athletics Federations; 1965–1975	Succeeded by Hanji Aoki
Preceded by Mitsujirō Ishii	President of the Japan Sport Association; 1975-1983	Succeeded by Kenji Fukunaga
