= Dai Shimamura =

Japanese politician (1960–2023)

- 島村 大
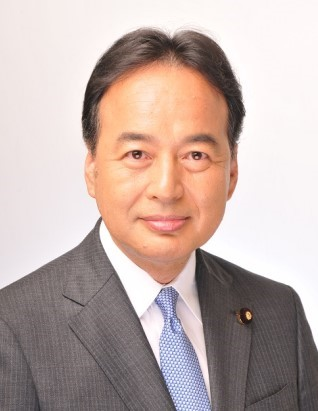
- Official portrait, 2021

Member of the House of Councillors
- In office 29 July 2013 – 30 August 2023
- Preceded by: Masashi Mito
- Succeeded by: Masaaki Waki
- Constituency: Kanagawa at-large

Personal details
- Born: 11 August 1960 Ichikawa, Chiba, Japan
- Died: 30 August 2023 (aged 63) Tokyo, Japan
- Party: Liberal Democratic
- Education: Tokyo Dental College

Dai Shimamura (August 11, 1960 – August 30, 2023) was a Japanese politician who was a member of the House of Councillors.

== Career ==
Shimamura graduated in 1985 from Tokyo Dental College and worked in industry until his election in 2011.

Shimamura died on August 30, 2023, at the age of 63.
