= Junko Mihara =

Japanese politician (born 1964)

- 三原 じゅん子
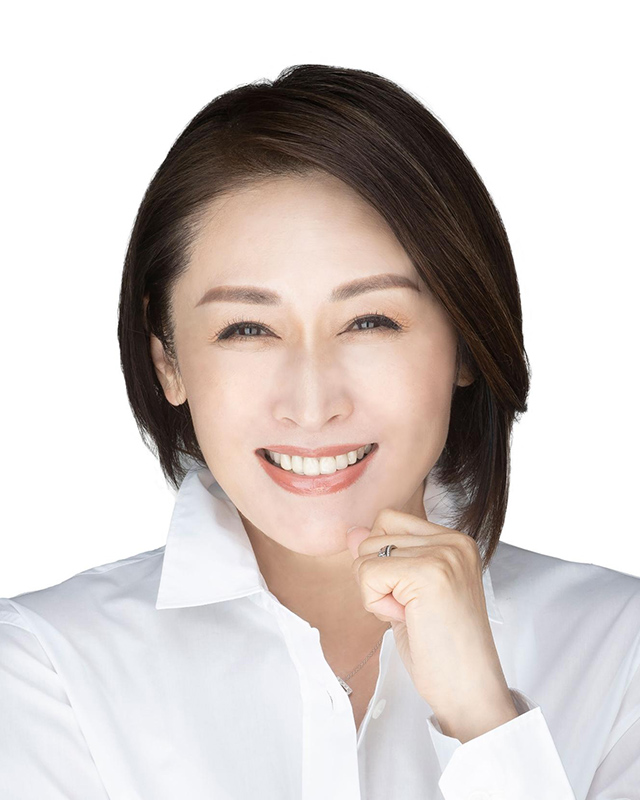
- Official portrait, 2022

Minister of State for Special Missions, Cabinet Office
- In office 1 October 2024 – 21 October 2025
- Prime Minister: Shigeru Ishiba
- Preceded by: Ayuko Kato

Member of the House of Councillors
- Incumbent
- Assumed office 26 July 2010
- Preceded by: Multi-member district
- Constituency: National PR (2010–2016); Kanagawa at-large (2016–present)

Personal details
- Born: 13 September 1964 (age 62) Itabashi, Tokyo, Japan
- Party: LDP (since 2010)
- Spouse(s): Masahiro Matsunaga (m. 1990; div. 1999) Nobuya "Koala" Miyatani (m. 1999; div. 2007) Yuya Nakane (m. 2016)
- Occupation: Singer • Actress • Racing driver • Politician
- Website: http://www.miharajunco.org/

Junko Mihara (三原 じゅん子, Mihara Junko; born 13 September 1964) is a Japanese politician and former singer, actress, and racing driver. She is a member of the Liberal Democratic Party.

== Entertainment career ==
Mihara made her debut as a teenager in the 1979 television series Kinpachi-sensei, and began a singing career in 1980. Her first hit sold more than 300,000 copies.

In 1987, Mihara began competing in auto racing. Mihara drove a Toyota Corolla in the Japanese Touring Car Championship from 1990 to 1991, sharing the car with her husband Masahiro Matsunaga and Shinichi Yamaji. From 1992 to 1995, she raced in the Spa 24 Hours in Belgium, followed by the All Japan Grand Touring Car Championship with Kumi Sato in 1996 and 1997; Mihara and Sato were co-drivers in the 1995 Spa 24 Hours. In 1998, she and Sato participated in the American Toyota Pro/Celebrity Race at the Grand Prix of Long Beach. Mihara remained involved in racing—particularly the JGTC's successor Super GT—after entering politics, serving as the secretary general of the Liberal Democratic Party's Parliamentary League for Motorsports.

Mihara underwent treatment for cervical cancer later in her life, and established a nursing home in March 2010 prior to her political debut.

== Political career ==
Mihara ran in the House of Councillors election in July 2010 as a proportional candidate of the Liberal Democratic Party and won, campaigning on her experience with women's health issues. She first appeared in the Diet on 30 July 2010. She was elected to a seat representing the Kanagawa at-large district in the July 2016 election and the July 2022 election.

Positions within the LDP:

- Member, Committee on Budget, HC
- Member, Special Committee on North Korean Abduction Issue and Related Matters, HC
- Director, Women's Affairs Division, LDP
- Deputy Chairperson, LDP Diet Affairs Committee in the House of Councillors, LDP
- Deputy Director, Health, Labour and Welfare Division, LDP

== Controversies ==
Mihara is in favor of visits to the controversial Yasukuni Shrine.

In March 2015, when speaking about dealing with tax evasion she urged Prime Minister Shinzō Abe to promote hakkō ichiu, a slogan meaning "the world under one roof". Although it is controversial as it was used during the WW2 for patriotism, she explained it as "an ethic which Japan has valued since its genesis".

== HPV vaccine ==
Mihara, a member of the House of Councillors and herself a cervical cancer survivor, became a vocal advocate for resuming proactive HPV vaccination. Although Mihara was never vaccinated herself, her personal experience with cervical cancer—including undergoing a hysterectomy—motivated her to campaign for broader access to the vaccine and stronger government support for inoculation programs. In public statements and interviews, she emphasized the urgency of protecting young women and expressed frustration over the years lost to misinformation and policy hesitation. Mihara described her advocacy as part of a broader fight against cancer, drawing on her own suffering to push for systemic change.
