= Hiroki Hajikano =

Japanese politician

- 初鹿野裕樹
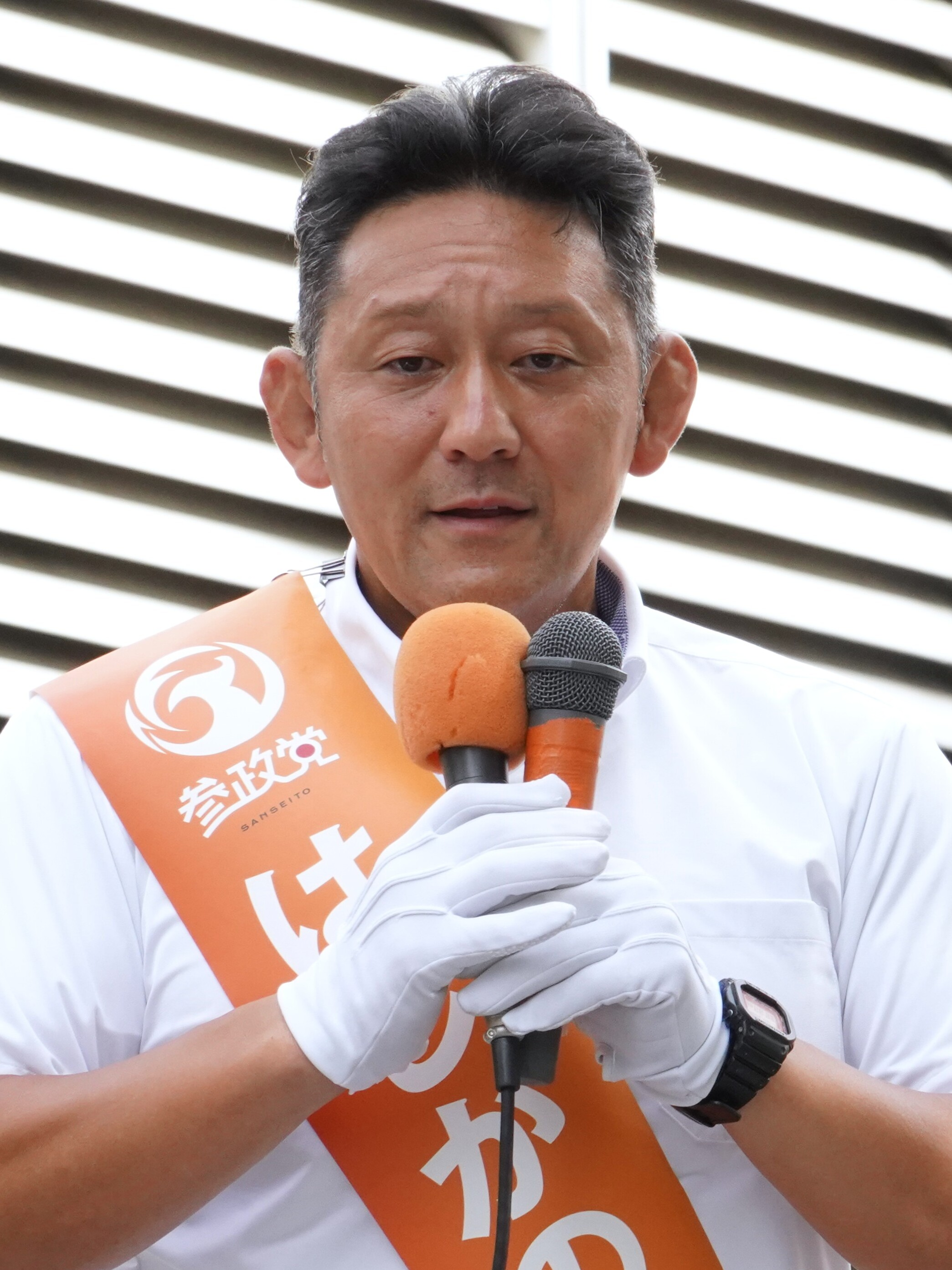

Member of the House of Councillors
- Incumbent
- Assumed office 29 July 2025
- Constituency: Kanagawa at-large district

Personal details
- Born: 6 July 1977 (age 49) Yokosuka, Kanagawa, Japan
- Party: Sanseito
- Education: Tokai University
- Occupation: Politician former police officer judo instructor

Hiroki Hajikano (初鹿野裕樹, Hajikano Hiroki, also known as Hiroki Hatsukano) is a Japanese politician and former Tokyo Metropolitan Police officer. He is a member of the House of Councillors representing the Kanagawa at-large district, elected in 2025 as a candidate of Sanseito, a right-wing party.

== Early life ==
Hajikano was born on 6 July 1977, in Yokosuka, Kanagawa Prefecture, and spent his school years in Yokohama. He began practicing judo in the second grade of elementary school after being introduced to it through an acquaintance of his older brother. While attending Higashi-Kanazawa High School he competed in the All Japan Junior Judo Weight Category Championships.

He then enrolled at Tokai University on a judo recommendation and competed in the 66 kilogram weight class for the university's judo club. He graduated from Tokai University's Faculty of Physical Education in March 2000.

== Law enforcement career ==
Hajikano joined the Tokyo Metropolitan Police Department in April 2000 and competed for its judo team, which won seven consecutive national team championships.

After retiring from active competition, he spent about 23 years as an instructor teaching judo, arrest techniques, and handgun use to officers, including patrol officers, riot police, and headquarters staff. He also held positions such as director and deputy head of referees for the Minato and Taito ward judo associations. Hajikano rose to the rank of assistant police inspector eventually.

He left the police department in December 2022, stating he had come to feel limited by police administration and wanted to enter politics instead. After leaving the force, he worked as an advisor to a security company and a precision machinery company.

== Political career ==
Hajikano ran for a seat on the Hayama town council in 2023 as an independent and lost. In October 2024, he ran for the House of Representatives in the Kanagawa 11th district as a Sanseito-endorsed candidate and lost.

In July 2025, he ran for the House of Councillors in the Kanagawa at-large constituency, a district electing four members, on the Sanseito ticket. He won the seat, receiving support from 577,085 voters and giving Sanseito its first seat in that constituency. He took office on 29 July 2025.

In the National Diet, he has served on the Land, Infrastructure, Transport, and Tourism Committee; and the House Steering Committee. Within Sanseito, he has also held roles including head of the party's general affairs division.

=== Political positions ===
On the campaign trail he argued for eliminating the consumption tax and gasoline tax in stages, opposed what he called excessive immigration policy, and called for better pay and treatment for police officers and members of the Self-Defense Forces. He supports the party's 'Japan First' platform, describing it as drawing distinction rather than discrimination against foreign residents.

== Controversies ==
During the 2025 campaign, Hajikano posted on X (formerly known as Twitter) on 18 June questioning the Nanjing Massacre, writing that it was regrettable that people still believed it had occurred and describing the Japanese army as having followed a code of "no burning, no raping, no killing." When another user said on 28 July that the massacre was historical fact, Hajikano responded with "Are you dreaming?”, and claimed a Chinese police chief at the time had denied it. Tokushi Kasahara, professor emeritus at Tsuru University, said the occurrence of the massacre is an established academic finding that the Japanese government has itself acknowledged, and criticized Hajikano's statements.

Separately on 7 July 2025, Hajikano posted claims on X that members of the Japanese Communist Party had killed and injured his associates through violent means. The party's Kanagawa prefectural committee called the claims false, demanded a retraction and apology, and, after receiving no response, filed a criminal complaint alleging the posts violated the Public Offices Election Act. The Kanagawa Prefectural Police officially accepted and processed the defamation and election law criminal complaint on 12 August 2025.
