= Kyosen Ōhashi =

Japanese politician (1934–2016)

- 大橋 巨泉
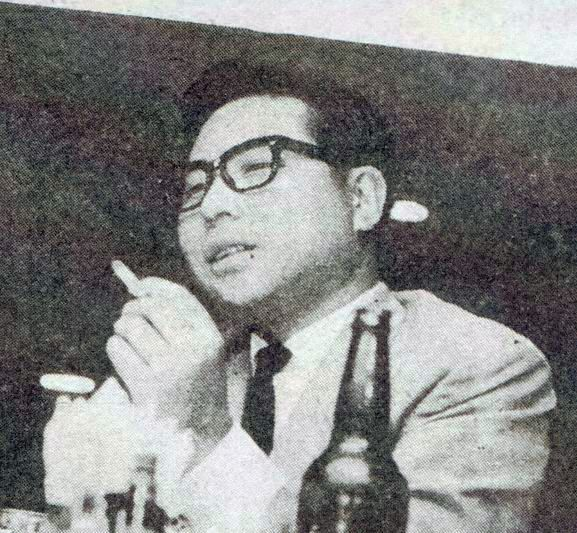
- Ōhashi in 1966

Member of the House of Councillors
- In office 29 July 2001 – 31 January 2002
- Preceded by: Multi-member district
- Succeeded by: Marutei Tsurunen
- Constituency: National PR

Personal details
- Born: 大橋 克巳 (Ōhashi Katsumi); 22 March 1934 Sumida, Tokyo, Japan
- Died: 12 July 2016 (aged 82) Chiba Prefecture, Japan
- Party: Democratic
- Spouse(s): Martha Miyake (m. 1956; div. 1964) Junko Asano (m. 1969)
- Education: Waseda University
- Occupation: Television host and writer

Kyosen Ōhashi (大橋 巨泉, Ōhashi Kyosen; March 22, 1934 – July 12, 2016) was a Japanese television host and writer. He also served briefly as a member of the House of Councillors in the Diet of Japan. His real name was Ōhashi Katsumi (大橋 克巳).

Born in Sumida, Tokyo, he grew up in Chiba prefecture and dropped out of the Waseda University. Declaring "semi-retirement", he then spent most of his time outside Japan, particularly in Canada during the summer, as well as in Australia and New Zealand during the winter in the northern hemisphere, in which he ran his "OK Gift Shop" (OK stands for Ohashi Kyosen).

When he resigned in the House of Councillors, Ōhashi was succeeded by Marutei Tsurunen, the first European-descended and openly foreign-born Japanese person to serve in the Diet.
