= 2022 Japanese House of Councillors election =

- 10 July 2022

124 of the 248 seats in the House of Councillors 125 seats needed for a majority
- Opinion polls
- Registered: 105,019,203 (▼0.86%)
- Turnout: 52.05% (▲3.25pp; Const. votes); 52.04% (▲3.25pp; National votes)
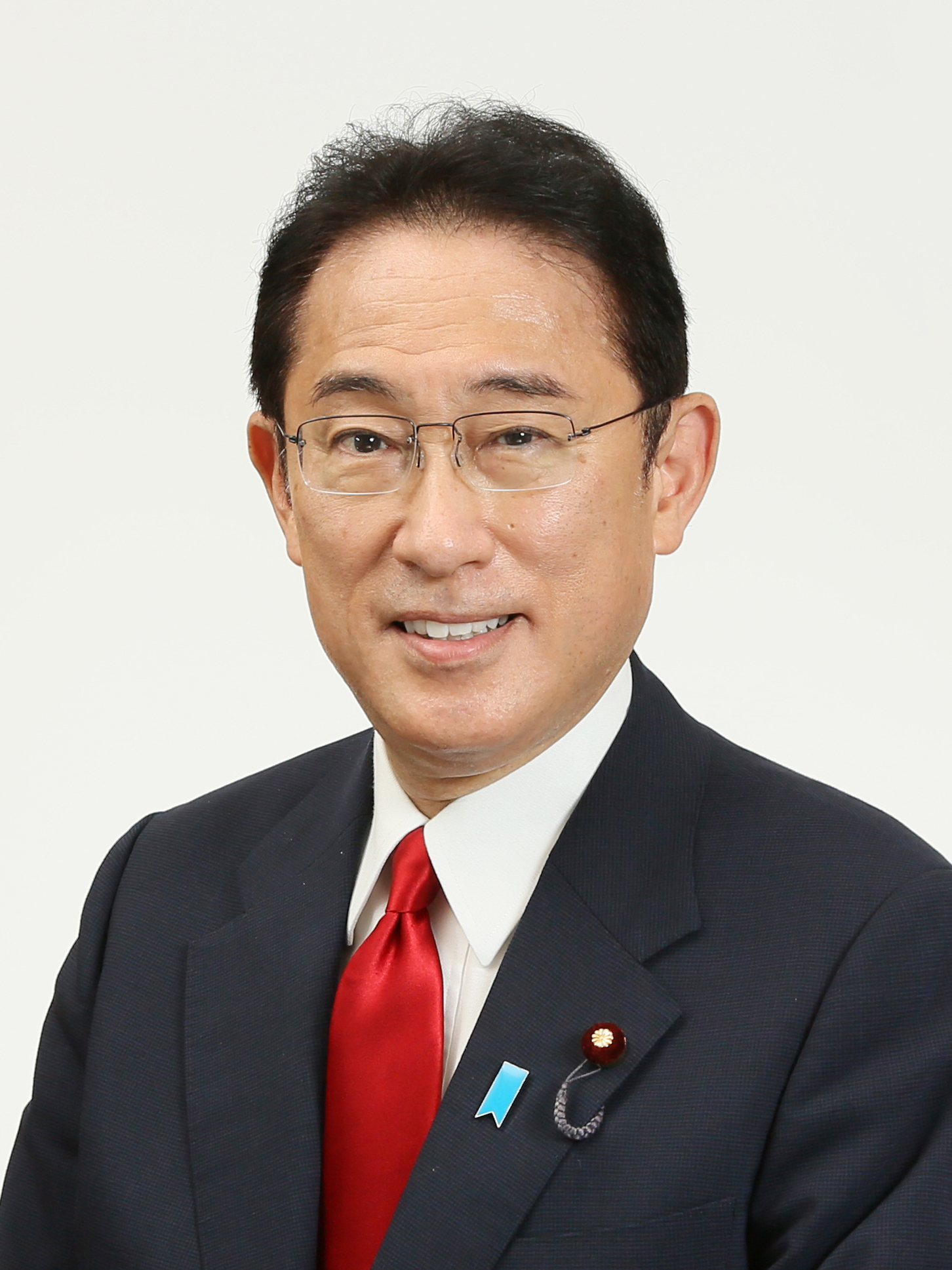

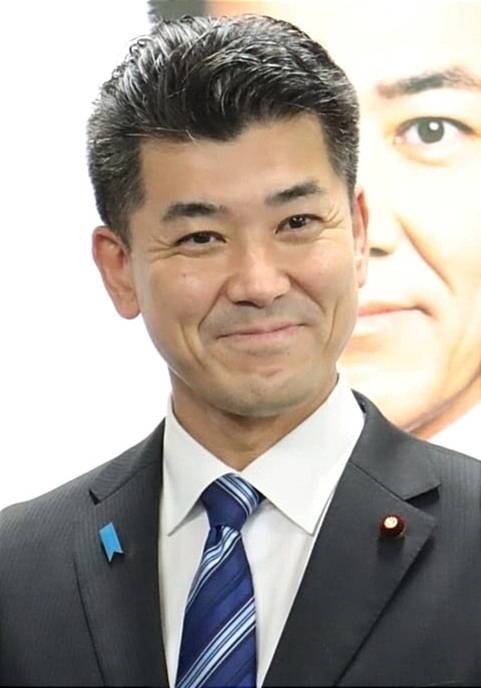

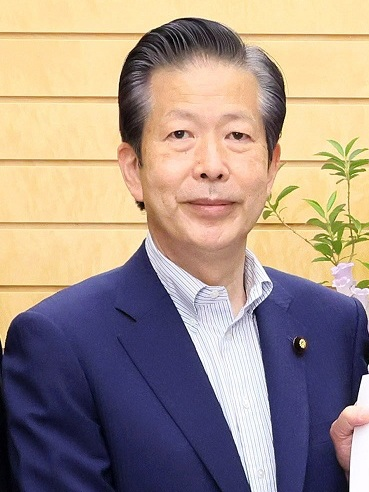

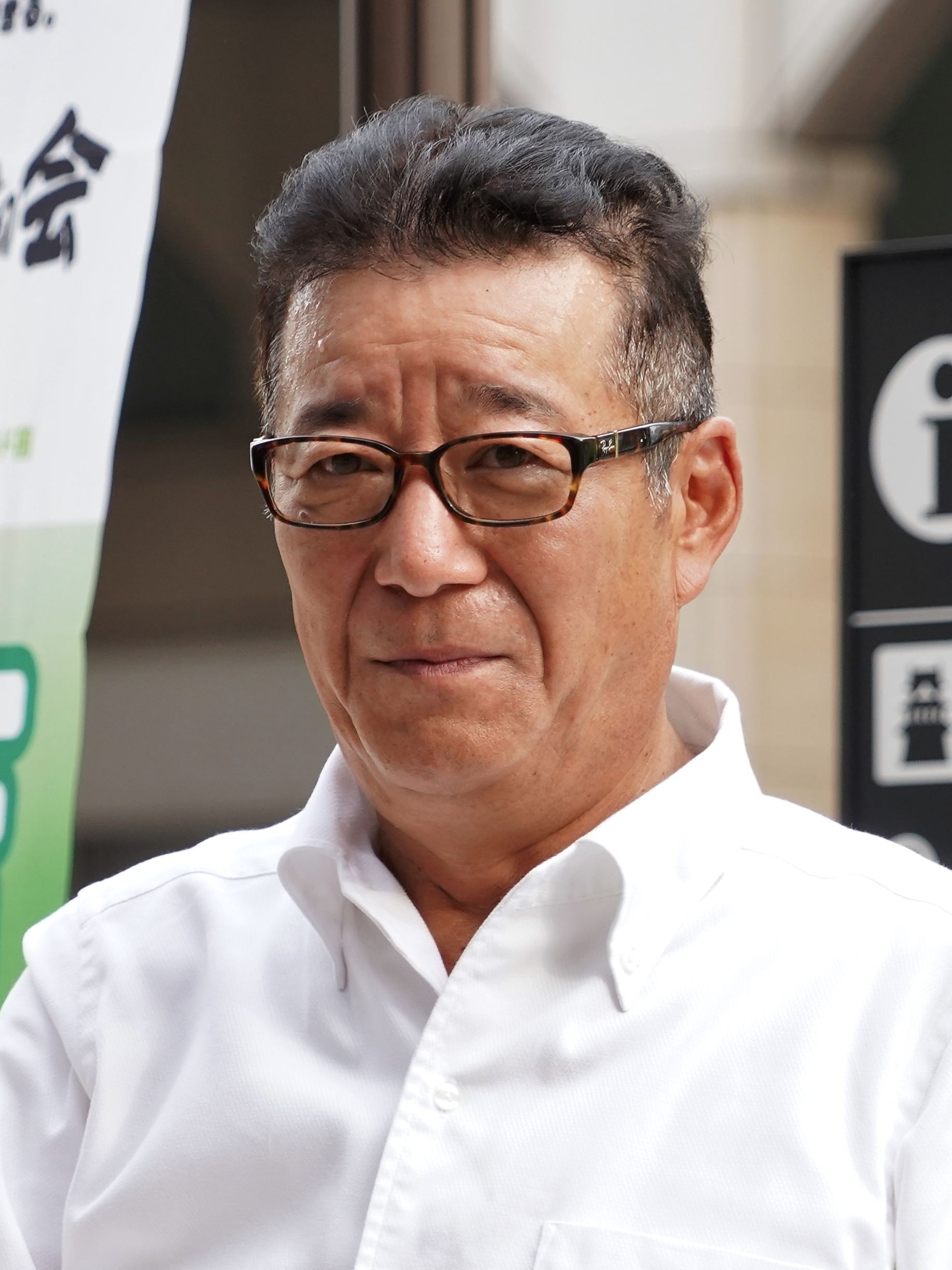

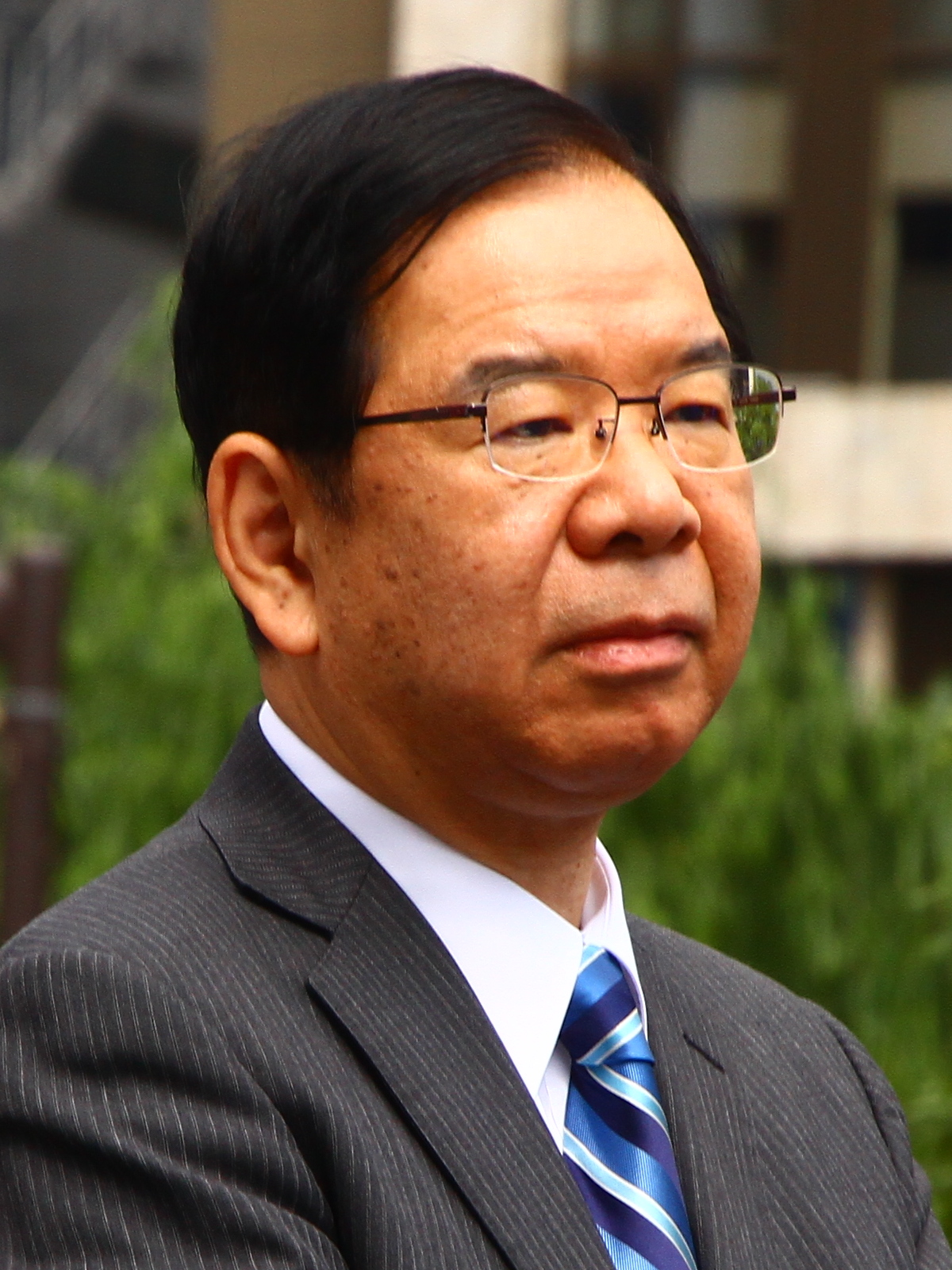

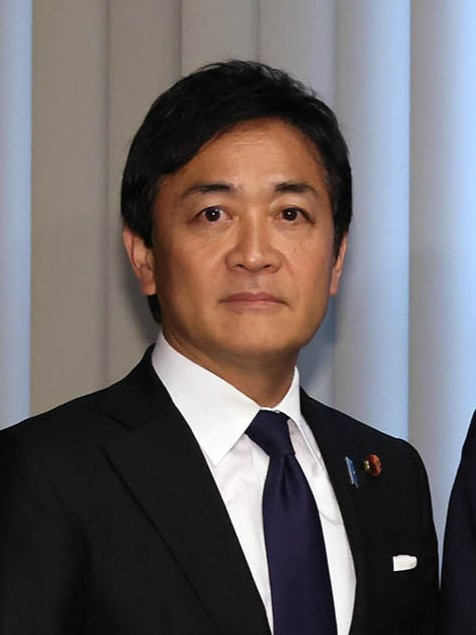

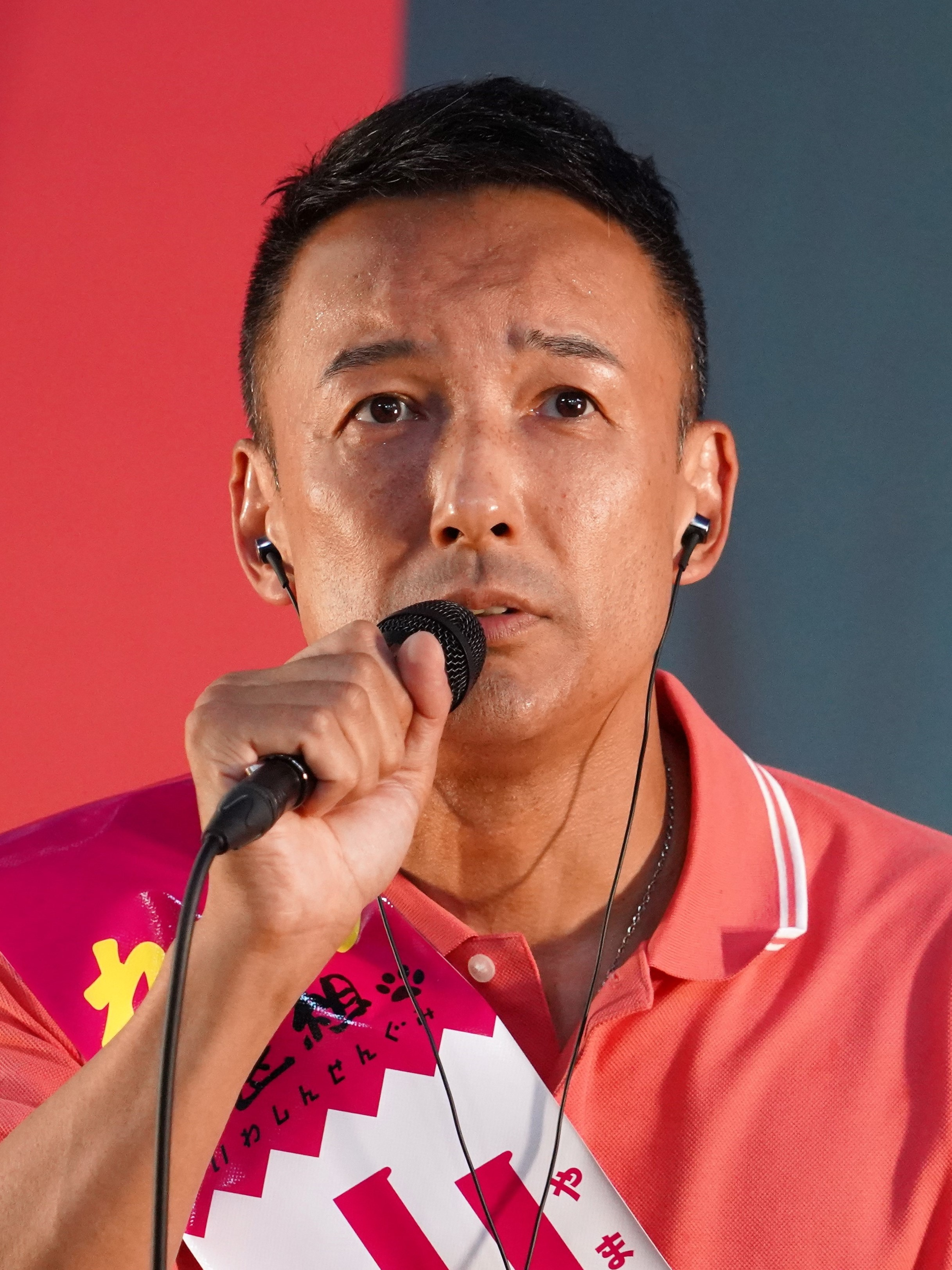

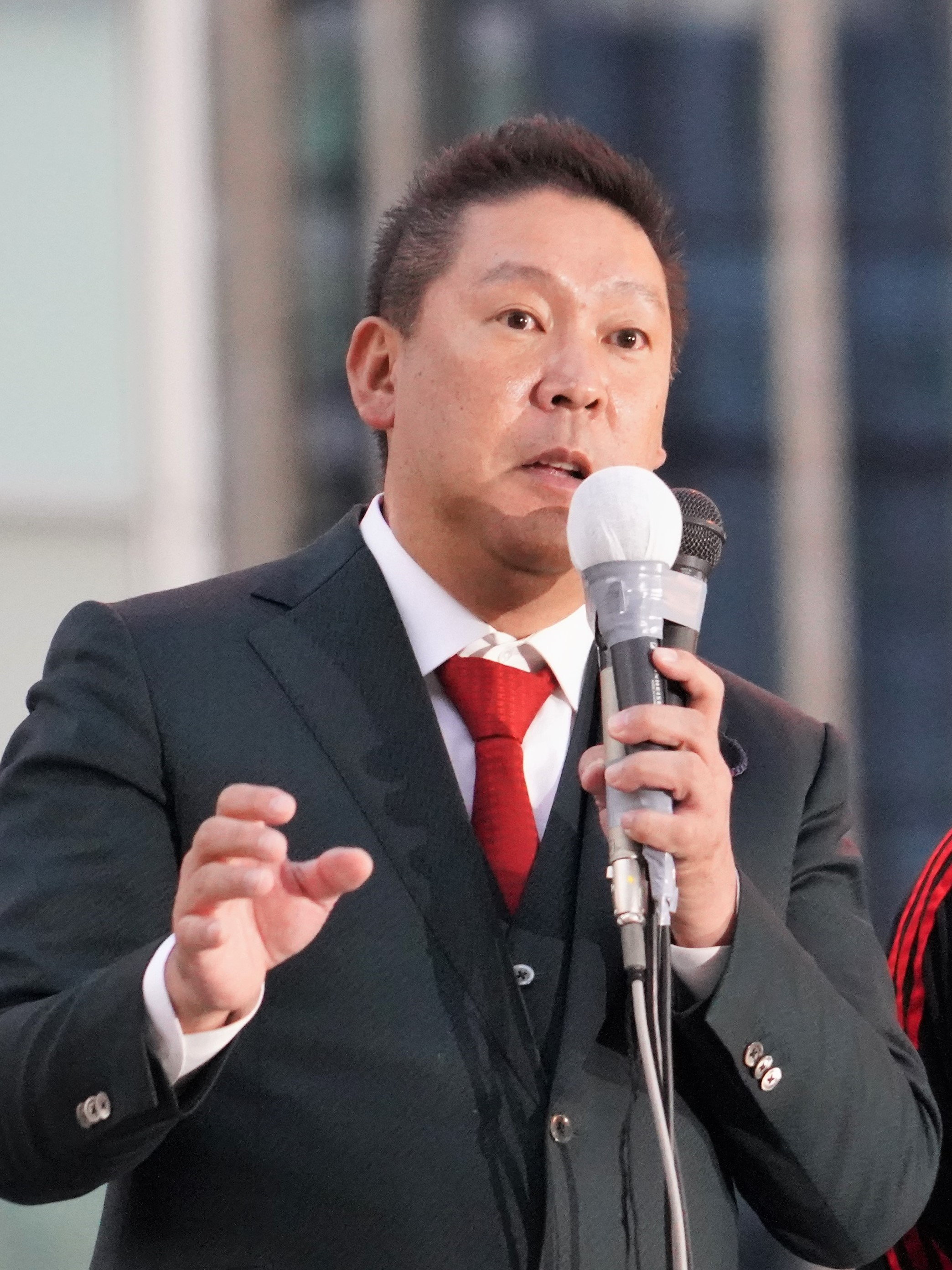

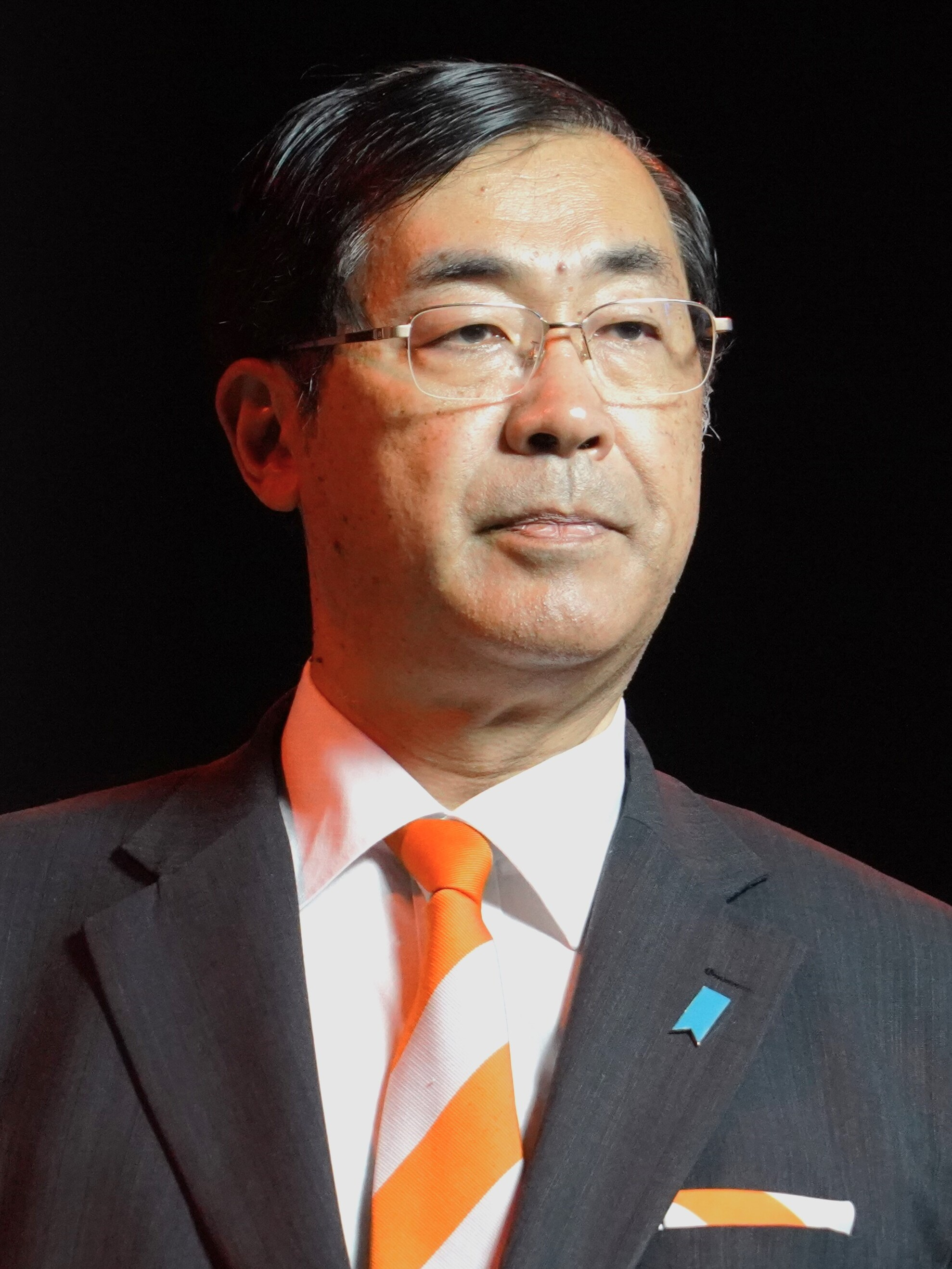
	First party	Second party	Third party
Leader	Fumio Kishida	Kenta Izumi	Natsuo Yamaguchi
Party	LDP	CDP	Komeito
Last election	113 seats	Did not exist	28 seats
Seats won	63	17	13
Seats after	119	39	27
Seat change	▲6	New (Note: The Constitutional Democratic Party was formally re-founded in September 2020 following a merger between the CDP, a majority of the former Democratic Party for the People and some independent Diet members.)	▼1
Constituency vote	20,603,298	8,154,330	3,600,490
% and swing	38.74% (▼1.03pp)	15.33% (New)	6.77% (▼1.00pp)
National vote	18,256,245	6,771,914	6,181,432
% and swing	34.43% (▼0.94pp)	12.77% (New)	11.66% (▼1.39pp)
	Fourth party	Fifth party	Sixth party
Leader	Ichiro Matsui	Kazuo Shii	Yuichiro Tamaki
Party	Ishin	JCP	DPP
Last election	16 seats	13 seats	Did not exist
Seats won	12	4	5
Seats after	21	11	11
Seat change	▲5	▼2	New (Note: The Democratic Party For the People was formally re-founded in September 2020 following a merger between a minority of the former DPP and some independent Diet members. The new party voted to retain the DPP name and Tamaki as leader.)
Constituency vote	5,533,657	3,636,534	2,038,655
% and swing	10.41% (▲3.13pp)	6.84% (▼0.53pp)	3.83% (New)
National vote	7,845,995	3,618,343	3,159,657
% and swing	14.80% (▲5.00pp)	6.82% (▼2.13pp)	5.96% (New)
	Seventh party	Eighth party	Ninth party
Leader	Tarō Yamamoto	Takashi Tachibana	Manabu Matsuda
Party	Reiwa	Anti-NHK	Sanseitō
Last election	2 seats	1 seat	Did not exist
Seats won	3	1	1
Seats after	5	2	1
Seat change	▲3	▲1	New
Constituency vote	989,716	1,106,508	2,018,215
% and swing	1.86% (▲1.43pp)	2.08% (▼0.94pp)	3.80% (New)
National vote	2,319,157	1,253,872	1,768,385
% and swing	4.37% (▼0.18pp)	2.36% (▲0.39pp)	3.33% (New)
- Results by constituency
President before election
Akiko Santō
LDP
Elected President
Hidehisa Otsuji
LDP

House of Councillors elections were held in Japan on 10 July 2022 to elect 125 of the 248 members of the upper house of the National Diet, for a term of six years. The elected candidate with the fewest votes in the Kanagawa prefectural district will serve for three years, as the district combined its regular and byelections.

The elections occurred within the first year of premiership of Fumio Kishida, President of the Liberal Democratic Party and it saw Kenta Izumi debut as the Leader of the opposition Constitutional Democratic Party. The election was overshadowed by the assassination of former Prime Minister Shinzo Abe (served 2006–2007 and 2012–2020) which led the anti-government protests and riots, which took place two days before ballots were cast. Abe was shot while delivering a campaign speech for Kei Satō, a member of the House of Councillors running for reelection. The assassin, who had previously served in the Japan Maritime Self-Defence Force, was arrested at the scene and reportedly confessed to targeting Abe due to a grudge he held against the Unification Church. Prime Minister Kishida denounced the assassination as an attack on Japan's democracy and vowed to defend a "free and fair election at all cost". In a post-election survey, 62.5 percent of the voters said their votes were not swayed by the assassination, while 15.1 percent said they were.

The governing Liberal Democratic Party modestly increased its seats in the chamber. Turnout slightly increased compared to the previous election while a new record was set for women elected to the chamber at 28%. Parties supportive of constitutional revision gained a combined total of 93 seats, thus gaining the two-thirds majority needed to trigger the parliamentary procedure which was lost in the 2019 election.

The disparity in the value of a vote between prefectural districts in the election ranged up to 3.03 times, leading to nationwide legal challenges.

== Background ==
Following the closing of the 208th session of the National Diet on 15 June 2022, the Second Kishida Cabinet held an extraordinary session to schedule an upper house election in which it was determined that the election would be formally announced to the public on June 22 with the vote to be held on 10 July 2022.

In May 2018, the government enacted a revision to the Public Offices Election Law that increased the number of seats in the House of Councillors by six, with three new seats being contested in 2019 and the other three being contested in 2022. As such, three new seats — one in the Saitama at-large district and two in the national PR block — were added to the House of Councillors as a result of the election.

A seat in the Kanagawa at-large district was left vacant following the resignation of Shigefumi Matsuzawa (independent), who was elected to the House of Councillors in the 2019 election. Matsuzawa resigned from his seat in the House of Councillors to run in the 2021 Yokohama mayoral election, for which he came in fifth. Since the seat was not eligible for a by-election, a merger election was held as a part of this election. This was the first time in 30 years - since the Saitama at-large district held one as part of the 1992 election - that a merger election was held. As a result, the Kanagawa at-large district elected five members this election instead of four, with the fifth-place winner serving for only three years instead of six. Furthermore, in October 2021, Kenji Nakanishi (Liberal Democratic), who was elected to the House of Councillors from the Kanagawa at-large district in the 2016 election, resigned his seat to compete in the 2021 Japanese general election for a seat in the House of Representatives, leaving his seat in the House of Councillors vacant prior to this election as well.

The "Special Postal Voting" system - put in place by the Corona Postal Voting Act passed in response to the global COVID-19 pandemic - was still in effect during this election. This system secured voting opportunities for those who could not vote in-person due to the pandemic. It was the first time the "Special Postal Voting" system was used for a House of Councillors election. In addition, a revision to the Public Offices Election Act was passed in April 2022 that allowed for party political broadcasts to be made through FM broadcasting.

On 8 July 2022, former Prime Minister Shinzo Abe (served 2006–2007 and 2012–2020) was assassinated in Nara City while delivering a campaign speech for Kei Satō, a member of the House of Councillors running for reelection. The assassination took place just two days before the election. In response, some candidates from the Liberal Democratic Party and other political parties canceled their campaign events on that day. Prime Minister Kishida denounced the assassination as an attack on Japan's democracy and vowed to defend a "free and fair election at all cost". In a post-election survey, 62.5 percent of the voters said their votes were not swayed by the assassination, while 15.1 percent said they were.

At 20:00 (8pm) JST on July 10, when the voting ended, various media outlets across Japan - including NHK and Japan's five major commercial broadcasting networks (Nippon TV, TV Asahi, TBS TV, TV Tokyo, and Fuji TV) - all reported the results of the exit poll all at once. It was reported that the ruling Liberal Democratic Party and their coalition partner Komeito won significantly more seats than was needed for a majority, while the opposition parties of the Constitutional Democratic Party, Democratic Party For the People, and the Japanese Communist Party all lost seats. In addition, the Japan Innovation Party (also known as the Innovation Party or the Restoration Party) was also projected to gain seats, and the exit poll projected that several independents would acquire seats as well.

The Democratic Party For the People had been described as "cozying up" to the Liberal Democratic Party (LDP). The lack of policy agreements and electoral pacts led to more opposition candidates contesting in single-seat prefectural districts.

=== Pre-election Composition ===
↓
39	37	14	13	1	2	14	55	14	56
O not up	O seats up	RO	RO up	I	V	K up	LDP seats up	K	LDP seats not up

== Electoral system ==
75 members were elected by single non-transferable vote (SNTV) and first-past-the-post (FPTP) voting in 45 multi-member and single-member prefectural electoral districts. The nationwide district elected 50 members by D'Hondt proportional representation with optionally open lists; the previous most open list system was modified in 2018 to give parties the option to prioritize certain candidates over the voters' preferences in the proportional election.

== Opinion polls ==
=== Proportional voting intention ===
Fieldwork date	Polling firm	Sample size	LDP	CDP	Ishin	KMT	JCP	DPFP	REI	DIY	SDP	NHK	Others	None/Und.	No ans.	Lead
10 Jul 2022	Election results	52.05% (Note: Election turnout.)	34.4	12.8	14.8	11.7	6.8	6.0	4.4	3.3	2.4	2.4	1.1	3.0	–	19.6
22–23 Jun 2022	Yomiuri/NNN	1,585	36	8	10	6	3	2	2	1	1	1	–	23	7	13
18–19 Jun 2022	ANN	1,043	33.1	8.5	7.3	5.4	4.8	2	1.2	–	0.6	0.4	1.7	35 (Note: Undecided/no answer: 31%; Do not vote: 4%)		1.9
17–19 Jun 2022	Nikkei/TV Tokyo	912	43	8	10	6	3	2	2	–	1	1	1	17	6	26
11–13 Jun 2022	Kyodo News	1,051	39.7	9.7	9.9	5.8	3.7	1.8	1.7	–	0.8	0.3	1.1	25.5		14.2
11–12 Jun 2022	go2senkyo/JX	983	36.1	16	12.6	6.3	7.9	2.8	1.8	0.7	0.7	0.8	1.8 (Note: Happiness Realization Party: 0.2%; Kunimori Conservative Party: 0.2%; Ishin Seito Shimpu: 0%; First no Kai: 0.2%; Others: 1.2%)	12.3	–	20.1
3–5 Jun 2022	Yomiuri/NNN	1,485	45	7	9	4	4	3	2	–	1	1	–	17	8	28
27–29 May 2022	Nikkei/TV Tokyo	935	50	7	8	4	3	2	2	–	0	0	1	15	8	35
21–22 May 2022	ANN	1,035	35.1	6.4	7.3	4.1	3.6	1.7	1.4	–	0.6	0.1	1.7	38 (Note: Undecided/no answer: 35.4%; Do not vote: 2.6%)		2.9
21–22 May 2022	Kyodo News	1,048	44	10	8.7	4.7	3.5	2.4	1.9	–	0.2	0.6	1.5	22.5		21.5
13–16 May 2022	Jiji Press	1,254	38.5	6.1	6.3	5.5	2.6	1.5	2	–	1	–	–	36.7	–	1.8
14–15 May 2022	go2senkyo/JX	995	34.5	17	14.8	6.5	6.8	2.9	1.7	–	1	0.5	1.5	12.7	–	17.5
13–15 May 2022	Yomiuri/NNN	1,052	44	8	10	5	2	3	1	–	–	–	–	18	8	26
16–17 Apr 2022	go2senkyo/JX	995	33.3	15.5	13.7	5.6	7.9	2.8	1.8	–	1.2	1.1	1.9	15.2	–	17.8
16–17 Apr 2022	ANN	1,014	33.9	9.2	7.3	3.3	4.8	1.6	0.9	–	0.7	0	1.3	37 (Note: Undecided/no answer: 34.1%; Do not vote: 2.9%)		3.1
16–17 Apr 2022	Kyodo News	1,067	41.9	8.7	10.9	4.6	3.6	1.4	1.6	–	0.3	1.6	0.7	24.7		17.2
8–11 Apr 2022	Jiji Press	1,226	37.4	7	8.6	3.8	2.4	2.1	1.7	–	0.2	0.5	–	34.9	–	2.5
19–20 Mar 2022	ANN	1,008	35.1	8.5	6.7	3.5	5.2	2.4	0.8	–	0.5	0.1	0.4	36.8 (Note: Undecided/no answer: 34.5%; Do not vote: 2.3%)		1.7
19–20 Mar 2022	Kyodo News	1,053	42.1	9.5	13.3	3.8	3.7	2.5	2.2	–	0.4	0.7	1.1	20.7		21.4
15 Mar–25 Apr 2022	Asahi	1,892	43	14	17	5	4	3	2	–	1	–	–	11		26
12–13 Mar 2022	go2senkyo/JX	1,001	31.2	19.1	17.8	5.4	6	2.3	1.2	–	0.8	0.8	2.3	13.2	–	12.1
19–20 Feb 2022	ANN	1,008	36.3	8.3	8.2	4.3	2.7	1.7	1.1	–	0.8	0.1	0.5	36 (Note: Undecided/no answer: 34%; Do not vote: 2%)		0.3
19–20 Feb 2022	Kyodo News	1,054	42.7	9.2	13.5	4.2	2	3.1	2.4	–	0.7	0.8	1.5	19.9		22.8
12–13 Feb 2022	go2senkyo/JX	1,004	32.5	13.9	19.2	5.3	6.5	2.5	1.5	–	1	0.9	3.1	13.6	–	13.3
4–6 Feb 2022	Yomiuri/NNN	1,071	41	9	14	4	3	2	2	–	1	1	–	18	6	23
22–23 Jan 2022	ANN	1,025	33.8	9.8	9.3	3.7	4.5	1.7	1.2	–	0.5	0.2	0.1	35.2 (Note: Undecided/no answer: 32.3%; Do not vote: 2.9%)		1.4
22–23 Jan 2022	Kyodo News	1,059	38.3	15.3	13.5	4.5	3.8	2.4	1.5	–	0.9	0.8	0.8	18.2		20.1
15–16 Jan 2022	go2senkyo/JX	~1,000	32.8	17.7	16.7	5.8	5.9	2	1.5	–	1.6	0.7	1.5	13.9	–	15.1
14–16 Jan 2022	Yomiuri/NNN	1,057	42	9	14	4	3	3	1	–	1	–	–	16	6	26
11–12 Dec 2021	go2senkyo/JX	~1,000	25.2	18.3	22.9	5.5	6.3	3	2.4	–	0.9	1.4	1.6	12.6	–	2.3
13–14 Nov 2021	go2senkyo/JX	~1,000	30.2	17.3	18.4	6.2	8.6	2.9	1.5	–	1.1	1.1	1.7	11.1	–	11.8
31 Oct 2021	2021 general election	55.97%	34.7	20.0	14.0	12.4	7.3	4.5	3.9	–	1.8	1.4	–	1.7	–	14.7

=== Seat projections ===
Seat projections from analysts (district seats + proportional representation)
Fieldwork date	Polling firm	LDP	CDP	Ishin	KMT	JCP	DPFP	REI	DIY	SDP	NHK	Ind./ Oth.	Majority	Gov.	Opp.
7 Jul	Election results	63 (45+18)	17 (10+7)	12 (4+8)	13 (7+6)	4 (1+3)	5 (2+3)	3 (1+2)	1 (0+1)	1 (0+1)	1 (0+1)	5 (5+0)	– (Note: LDP–KMT coalition: +13)	76 (52+24)	49 (23+26)
7 Jul	Kaoru Matsuda for Weekly Fuji	62 (44+18)	16 (9+7)	13 (5+8)	14 (7+7)	5 (2+3)	4 (2+2)	3 (1+2)	–	1 (0+1)	0	7 (5+2)	–1 (Note: LDP–KMT coalition: +13)	76 (51+25)	49 (24+25)
4-5 Jul	Asahi Shimbun	56–65	12–20	10–16	12–15	3–8	2–7	1–5	–	0–1	0–1	4–11	–	68–80	32–69
1-3 Jul	Yomiuri-NNN	55–65	13–24	11–19	10–15	3–8	2–5	2–4	–	0–1	0–1	4–7	–	65–80	35–69
23 Jun	Sankei Shimbun												–	70–82	
22-23 Jun	Asahi Shimbun	56–66	13–22	9–15	12–15	4–8	1–7	1–5	–	0–2	0–2	4–8	–	68–81	32–69
21 Jun	Hiroshi Miura for Sports Hōchi	62 (43+19)			14								–	76	

== Results ==
The ruling Liberal Democratic Party modestly increased its seats in the chamber. Turnout slightly increased compared to the previous election while a new record was set for women elected to the chamber at 28%.

Parties supportive of constitutional revision (Liberal Democratic Party, Komeito, Japan Innovation Party, and Democratic Party For the People) won a combined total of 93 seats, and maintained the two-thirds majority needed to trigger the parliamentary procedure. Sanseito and NHK Party, with three seats combined, are also in favour of rewriting the Constitution.

The disparity in the value of a vote between prefectural districts in the election ranged up to 3.03 times (with a vote in Kanagawa Prefecture having only one-third the impact of a vote in Fukui Prefecture), leading to nationwide legal challenges. The Supreme Court had previously concluded after Upper House elections in 2010 and 2013 that a maximum vote-weight disparity of around 5 times was in a "state of unconstitutionality", with the current disparity coming somewhat close to that number. Prefectures have been resistant to combining electoral districts within their boundaries.

Party	National			Constituency			Seats			
Party	Votes	%	Seats	Votes	%	Seats	Won	Not up	Total after	+/–
Liberal Democratic Party	18,256,245	34.43	18	20,603,298	38.74	45	63	56	119	+6
Japan Innovation Party	7,845,995	14.80	8	5,533,657	10.41	4	12	9	21	+5
Constitutional Democratic Party	6,771,914	12.77	7	8,154,330	15.33	10	17	22	39	+7
Komeito	6,181,432	11.66	6	3,600,490	6.77	7	13	14	27	–1
Japanese Communist Party	3,618,343	6.82	3	3,636,534	6.84	1	4	7	11	–2
Democratic Party For the People	3,159,657	5.96	3	2,038,655	3.83	2	5	5	10	New
Reiwa Shinsengumi	2,319,157	4.37	2	989,716	1.86	1	3	2	5	+3
Sanseitō	1,768,385	3.33	1	2,018,215	3.80	0	1	0	1	New
Social Democratic Party	1,258,502	2.37	1	178,911	0.34	0	1	0	1	–1
NHK Party	1,253,872	2.36	1	1,106,508	2.08	0	1	1	2	+1
Burdock Party	193,724	0.37	0				0	0	0	New
Happiness Realization Party	148,020	0.28	0	134,718	0.25	0	0	0	0	0
Japan First Party	109,046	0.21	0	74,097	0.14	0	0	0	0	New
Kunimori Conservative Party	77,861	0.15	0	111,956	0.21	0	0	0	0	New
Ishin Seito Shimpu	65,107	0.12	0	204,102	0.38	0	0	0	0	New
First no Kai				284,629	0.54	0	0	0	0	New
Children's Party				50,662	0.10	0	0	0	0	New
Japan Reform Party				46,641	0.09	0	0	0	0	New
Kyowa Party				41,014	0.08	0	0	0	0	New
Free Republican Party				33,636	0.06	0	0	0	0	New
Metaverse Party				19,100	0.04	0	0	0	0	New
Party to Realize Bright Japan with a Female Emperor				10,268	0.02	0	0	0	0	New
Smile Japan Party				5,409	0.01	0	0	0	0	New
Party to Know the Truth of Renewable Energy				3,868	0.01	0	0	0	0	New
Peace Party				3,559	0.01	0	0	0	0	New
Tenmei Party				3,283	0.01	0	0	0	0	New
Party to take over U.S. military base in Okinawa to Tokyo				3,043	0.01	0	0	0	0	New
Wake Up the Japanese Party				2,440	0.00	0	0	0	0	New
Nuclear Fusion Party				1,913	0.00	0	0	0	0	New
Independents				4,285,360	8.06	5	5	7	12	–5
Total	53,027,260	100.00	50	53,180,012	100.00	75	125	123	248	0
Valid votes	53,027,260	97.02		53,180,012	97.29					
Invalid/blank votes	1,626,202	2.98		1,479,020	2.71					
Total votes	54,653,462	100.00		54,659,032	100.00					
Registered voters/turnout	105,019,203	52.04		105,019,203	52.05					
Source: Ministry of Internal Affairs and Communications

=== By constituency ===
Constituency	Total seats	Seats won										
Constituency	Total seats	LDP	CDP	Komeito	Ishin	DPP	JCP	Reiwa	Sansei	NHK	SDP	Ind.
Aichi	4	1	1	1		1						
Akita	1	1										
Aomori	1		1									
Chiba	3	2	1									
Ehime	1	1										
Fukui	1	1										
Fukuoka	3	1	1	1								
Fukushima	1	1										
Gifu	1	1										
Gunma	1	1										
Hiroshima	2	1										1
Hokkaido	3	2	1									
Hyōgo	3	1		1	1							
Ibaraki	2	1										1
Ishikawa	1	1										
Iwate	1	1										
Kagawa	1	1										
Kagoshima	1	1										
Kanagawa	5	2	1	1	1							
Kumamoto	1	1										
Kyoto	2	1	1									
Mie	1	1										
Miyagi	1	1										
Miyazaki	1	1										
Nagano	1		1									
Nagasaki	1	1										
Nara	1	1										
Niigata	1	1										
Ōita	1	1										
Okinawa	1											1
Okayama	1	1										
Osaka	4	1		1	2							
Saga	1	1										
Saitama	4	1	1	1								1
Shiga	1	1										
Shizuoka	2	1										1
Tochigi	1	1										
Tokushima–Kōchi	1	1										
Tokyo	6	2	1	1			1	1				
Tottori–Shimane	1	1										
Toyama	1	1										
Wakayama	1	1										
Yamagata	1					1						
Yamaguchi	1	1										
Yamanashi	1	1										
National	50	18	7	6	8	3	3	2	1	1	1	
Total	125	63	17	13	12	5	4	3	1	1	1	5
