= Ichirō Kōno =

Japanese politician (1898-1965)

- 河野 一郎
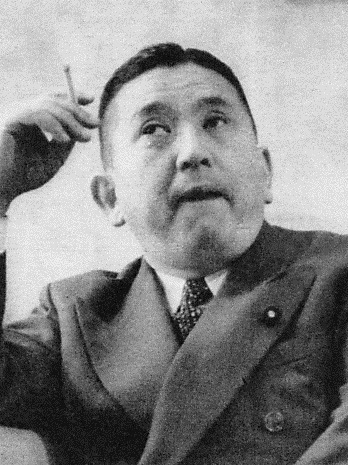
- Kōno in 1953

Deputy Prime Minister of Japan
- In office 18 July 1964 – 8 July 1965
- Prime Minister: Hayato Ikeda; Eisaku Satō
- Preceded by: Shūji Masutani (1960)
- Succeeded by: Takeo Miki (1972)
Ministerial offices
Minister of Construction
In office 18 July 1962 – 18 July 1964
Prime Minister	Hayato Ikeda
Preceded by	Umekichi Nakamura
Succeeded by	Osanori Koyama
Minister of Agriculture and Forestry
In office 18 July 1961 – 18 July 1962
Prime Minister	Hayato Ikeda
Preceded by	Hideyo Sutō
Succeeded by	Seishi Shigemasa
In office 10 December 1954 – 23 December 1956
Prime Minister	Ichirō Hatoyama
Preceded by	Shigeru Hori
Succeeded by	Ichitarō Ide
Director-General of the Economic Planning Agency
In office 10 July 1957 – 12 June 1958
Prime Minister	Nobusuke Kishi
Preceded by	Kōichi Uda
Succeeded by	Takeo Miki
Director-General of the Administrative Management Agency
In office 22 November 1955 – 23 December 1956
Prime Minister	Ichirō Hatoyama
Preceded by	Shōjirō Kawashima
Succeeded by	Tomejirō Ōkubo

Member of the House of Representatives
- In office 2 October 1952 – 8 July 1965
- Preceded by: Kenzō Kōno
- Succeeded by: Yōhei Kōno
- Constituency: Kanagawa 3rd
- In office 21 February 1932 – 22 June 1946
- Preceded by: Kyūjirō Okazaki
- Succeeded by: Inosuke Nakanishi
- Constituency: Kanagawa 3rd (1932–1946); Kanagawa at-large (1946)

Personal details
- Born: 2 June 1898 Ashigarashimo, Kanagawa, Japan
- Died: 8 July 1965 (aged 67)
- Party: Liberal Democratic (1955–1965)
- Other political affiliations: Rikken Seiyūkai (1932–1940); IRAA (1940–1945); JLP (1945–1946); LP (1951–1953); LP–H (1953–1954); JDP (1954–1955)
- Children: Yōhei Kōno
- Relatives: Kenzō Kōno (brother); Taro Kono (grandson)
- Education: Waseda University

Ichirō Kōno (河野 一郎, Kōno Ichirō; June 2, 1898 – July 8, 1965) was a Japanese politician during the postwar period who served as Deputy Prime Minister and a member of the National Diet. As Deputy Prime Minister, he was in charge of the 1964 Tokyo Olympics. In the 1950s and 1960s, he was the head of the powerful "Kōno Faction" within the ruling Liberal Democratic Party. Kōno aspired to become prime minister, but although he held a large number of important party and cabinet positions, reflecting his power and influence, he was not able to rise to the premiership before his death in 1965.

Elected to represent a portion of Kanagawa Prefecture, Kōno also exercised a powerful influence over his home prefecture, to such an extent that Kanagawa came to be nicknamed "Kōno Kingdom" (河野王国, Kōno ōkoku).

== Early life ==
Kōno was born in 1898 to a wealthy farming family (gōnō) in Toyokawa village, Ashigarashimo District, Kanagawa Prefecture (present-day Naruda, Odawara City). His father, Jihei Kōno, served successively as mayor of Toyokawa, a member of the district council, and chairman of the Kanagawa Prefectural Assembly. Ichirō would later inherit many of his father's connections as he built up his own powerful political faction.

Groomed for a life in politics from a young age, Kōno graduated with a degree in political science from Waseda University, where he also competed in track and field. After graduation, Kōno worked for the Asahi Shimbun newspaper before entering electoral politics.

Kōno was first elected to the National Diet in 1932, and represented the Rikken Seiyūkai party. In the 1942 election, following the forced dissolution of all political parties except for a single national party called the Imperial Rule Assistance Association (IRAA), Kōno ran for reelection as a "non-recommended candidate," meaning he was not recommended by the IRAA. However, Kōno's base of power in Kanagawa was too strong and he easily won reelection. After winning the election, Kōno immediately joined the IRAA.

== Postwar power broker ==
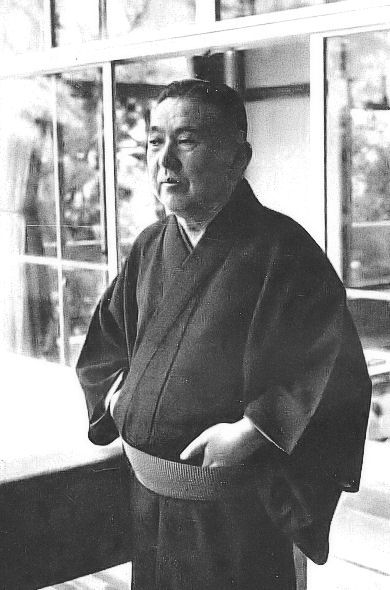
Kōno in 1961

After Japan's defeat in World War II, Kōno was purged as a wartime leader by the US military occupation of Japan. Depurged in 1951 as part of the Reverse Course, Kōno helped Ichirō Hatoyama found the Liberal Party, which later merged with the Democratic Party in 1955 to become the Liberal Democratic Party.

In 1956, Kōno founded a "study group" called the "Spring and Autumn Society" (春秋会, Shunjūkai), which became the basis of his powerful personal faction in the Diet. Thereafter, Kōno routinely contended for the premiership in LDP party elections, and held a number of party and cabinet posts, including director of the Economic Planning Agency (1957-1958), Minister of Agriculture and Forestry (1961-1962), Minister of Construction (1962-1964), and Minister of State in charge of planning the 1964 Tokyo Olympics (1964-1965).

In 1959, Prime Minister Nobusuke Kishi made it clear that he intended to seek an unprecedented third term in office, in violation of a longstanding norm that Japanese prime ministers serve only two terms before stepping aside to make way for the next person in line. To facilitate this, Kishi signed a secret written agreement with Kōno, also co-signed by fellow faction leaders and LDP heavyweights Eisaku Satō and Banboku Ōno, stating that Ōno would be the next prime minister after Kishi's time in office concluded, followed in turn by Kōno and Satō, in exchange for all three leaders vocally supporting Kishi's administration and his bid for a third term.

However, when Kishi's mishandling of the renewal of the US-Japan Security Treaty led to the massive Anpo protests, Kōno saw an opportunity to move up the timeline and scuttle Kishi's proposed third term. When Kishi called for a surprise vote on the revised treaty without informing rival factions in his own party, Kōno deliberately absented himself and his faction from the vote in a show of protest. Thereafter, Kōno devoted himself to bringing down the Kishi cabinet as soon as possible. As punishment for his rebellion, Kōno was entirely excluded from the first cabinet of Kishi's successor Hayato Ikeda. In August 1960, Kōno threatened to bring down 1955 System by bolting the Liberal Democratic Party along with his faction and other allied factions, but was at length convinced to remain, and was eventually brought back into the cabinet as Minister of Agriculture and Forestry in 1961.

In the aftermath of the Anpo Protests, a wave of right-wing violence against major political figures was unleashed in Japan, and as part of this wave, police uncovered a plot to assassinate Kōno in 1963.

Over the years, Kōno had developed a reputation as an energetic and prudent cabinet minister across a number of different cabinets. Accordingly, in 1964 Prime Minister Ikeda tasked Kōno with the crucial task of overseeing the 1964 Tokyo Olympics. The Olympics were hailed by the Japanese media and around the world as a great success, winning Kōno praise for his effective management.

When Ikeda was forced to resign due to laryngeal cancer which ultimately proved fatal, Kōno was a leading candidate to succeed Ikeda as prime minister, along with Kishi's younger brother Eisaku Satō. However, out of respect for Ikeda's dying wish that Satō succeed him, Kōno declined to run for party president and instead supported Satō's ascension to the premiership. Kōno was rewarded with posts in the Satō cabinet as Deputy Prime Minister and Minister of Sports in charge of physical education.

Kōno died suddenly on July 8, 1965, of a ruptured aortic aneurysm. After Kōno's death, leadership of Kōno's powerful faction was inherited by faction member Yasuhiro Nakasone.

== Legacy ==
Kōno was the founding member of a political dynasty in Japanese politics which later featured his younger brother Kenzō Kōno, his second son Yōhei Kōno, and his grandson (and Yohei's son) Tarō Kōno.

Political offices
Preceded by Shigeru Hori	Minister of Agriculture and Forestry; 1954–1956	Succeeded by Ichitarō Ide
Preceded by Shōjirō Kawashima	Director General of the Administrative Management Agency; 1955–1956	Succeeded by Tomejirō Ōkubo
Preceded by Kōichi Uda	Director General of the Economic Planning Agency; 1957–1958	Succeeded by Takeo Miki
Preceded by Hideo Sutō	Minister of Agriculture and Forestry; 1961–1962	Succeeded by Seishi Shigemasa
Preceded by Umekichi Nakamura	Minister of Construction; 1962–1964	Succeeded by Osanori Koyama
New office	Minister of State (with responsibility for the Tokyo Olympics); 1964–1965	Office abolished
Party political offices
New office	Secretary General of the Liberal Party; 1945–1946	Succeeded by Banboku Ōno
Preceded by Eisaku Satō	Chair, General Affairs Committee of the Liberal Democratic Party; 1958–1959	Succeeded by Shuji Masutani
New title	Head of Shunjūkai; 1956–1965	Succeeded by Kiyoshi Mori
Sporting positions
Preceded by Hiroshi Kasuga	President of the Japan Association of Athletics Federations; 1965	Succeeded by Kenzō Kōno
