= Akihiro Kagoshima =

Japanese politician (born 1988)

- 籠島 彰宏
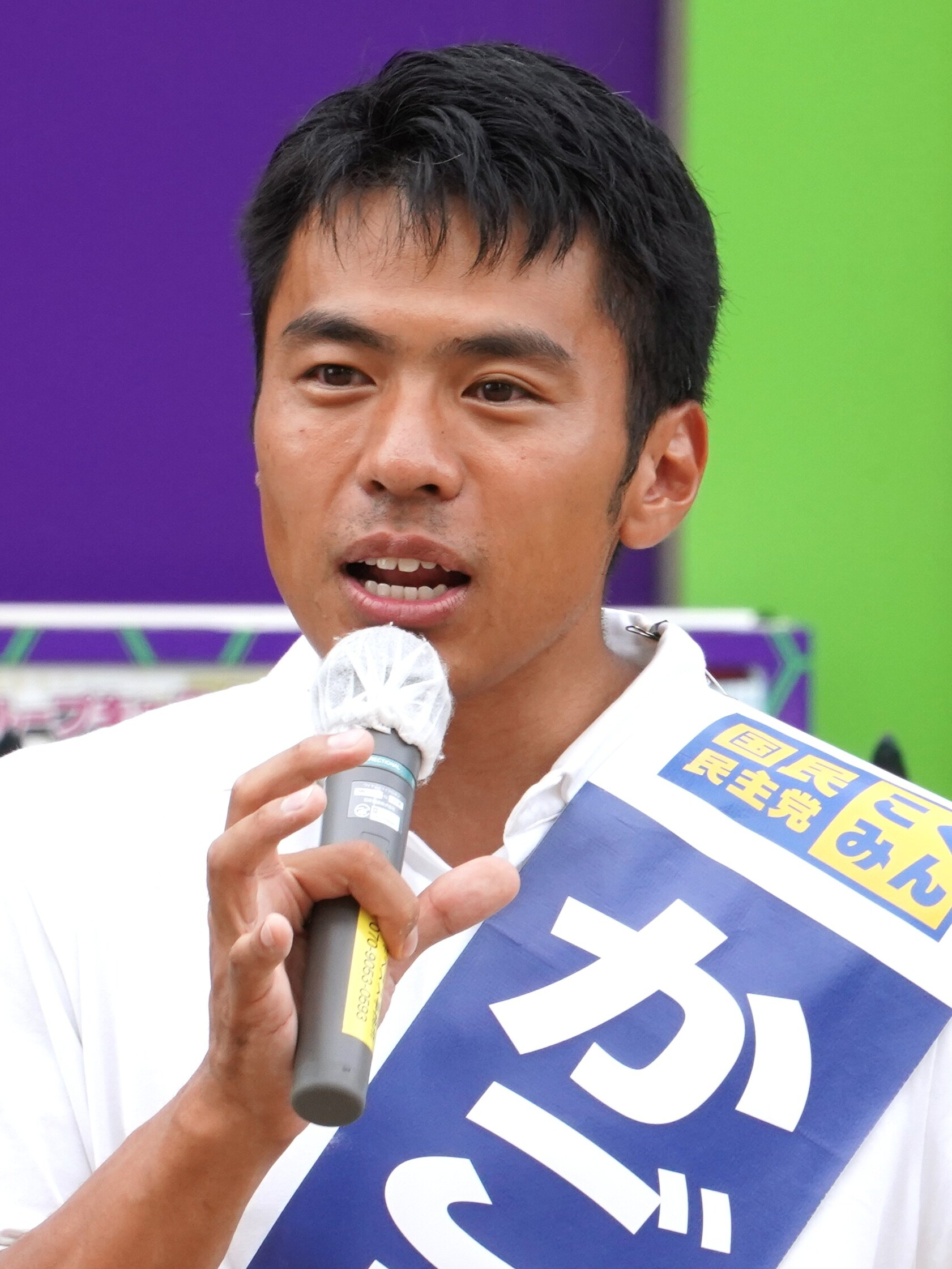
- Kagoshima in 2025

Member of the House of Councillors
- Incumbent
- Assumed office 29 July 2025
- Preceded by: Sayaka Sasaki
- Constituency: Kanagawa at-large

Personal details
- Born: 8 December 1988 (age 37) Sapporo, Hokkaido, Japan
- Party: DPP
- Education: Tokyo Institute of Technology; University of Tokyo

Akihiro Kagoshima (籠島彰宏, Kagoshima Akihiro; born 8 December 1988) is a Japanese politician serving as a member of the House of Councillors since 2025. He previously worked at the Ministry of Agriculture, Forestry and Fisheries and the OECD.
