= Marutei Tsurunen =

Japanese politician (born 1940)

- 弦念 丸呈

Member of the House of Councillors
- In office 8 February 2002 – 28 July 2013
- Preceded by: Kyosen Ōhashi
- Succeeded by: Multi-member district
- Constituency: National PR

Member of the Yugawara Town Council
- In office 1992–1995

Personal details
- Born: Martti Ilmari Turunen; 30 April 1940 (age 86) Lieksa, North Karelia, Finland
- Citizenship: Japan (since 1979)
- Party: Democratic
- Occupation: Writer, translator

Japanese name
- Kanji: 弦念 丸呈
- Hiragana: つるねん・まるてい
- Katakana: ツルネン・マルテイ

Marutei Tsurunen (Japanese: ツルネン・マルテイ, romanized: Tsurunen Marutei, Finnish: Martti Turunen; born 30 April 1940) is a Finnish-born Japanese retired politician, translator, and author. He is the first foreign-born Japanese of European origin to serve as a member of the Diet of Japan. He was a member of the Democratic Party of Japan, where he served as Director General of the International Department. He served in the House of Councillors from 2002 until losing reelection in 2013 and retiring from politics.

== Early life ==
Tsurunen was born Martti Ilmari Turunen in the village of Höntönvaara in Lieksa, Finland, and grew up in nearby Jaakonvaara. Near the end of the Continuation War, Tsurunen (then four years old) and his family were among the few survivors of a Soviet partisan attack on the village.

In 1967, at the age of 27, Tsurunen traveled to Japan as a lay missionary of the Lutheran Church, accompanied by his first wife, who was also a Finn; they later divorced. Having decided to become Japanese, he gained his Japanese citizenship in 1979.

In the 1980s, he published multiple Finnish translations of Japanese texts, including The Tale of Genji.

== Political career ==
He first ran for city council in 1992 in the town of Yugawara and won a seat, coming in fourth place with 1,051 votes.

He ran for a seat in the House of Councilors, the Japanese diet's Upper House, for Kanagawa at-large district without party backing in 1995. He received 339,484 votes, coming in fourth (the top three candidates were elected), losing a seat to the Socialist candidate who won 371,889 votes. He ran again in 1998 and received 502,712, just 8,000 short of winning a seat, telling voters "Please vote for me and send the first Japanese citizen with blue eyes to the upper house" and "Let's change Japan from an economic power into a citizen-friendly nation, where you don't need to worry about old age and pollution". He also proposed "sexual quotas for legislative bodies, so that from 40% to 60% of parliament and local assemblies would be female". In 2000, he ran as a candidate of the Democratic Party of Japan for a seat in the Lower House, and again in 2001 for a seat in the Upper House, both unsuccessfully. In 2001, running for the nationwide proportional representation district, he garnered 159,920 votes, 14,036 short of what he needed to win a seat. However, in 2002, an incumbent, Kyosen Ohashi, resigned from the house and he won a seat by "kuriage" replacement, by which he took the seat because he had the largest number of votes after the winner.

He was directly reelected in 2007 with 242,742 votes, the 6th-highest in his party, but lost his seat in the 2013 election after garnering only 82,858 votes (finishing in 12th place).

== Family ==
Tsurunen is married to Sachiko Tanaka, and they have two children. He also had three children with his first wife. He currently lives in Kamakura with his wife, their son, and his children.

== In the media ==
Finnish media personality Markus Kajo interviewed Tsurunen in Finnish for the third episode of the documentary series Nousevan auringon Kajo in 2006.

Tsurunen published his autobiography Sinisilmäinen samurai ("The blue-eyed samurai") in 2015 via Gummerus.

== See also ==
- List of naturalized Japanese politicians
