= Kenji Nakanishi =

Japanese politician

- 中西 健治
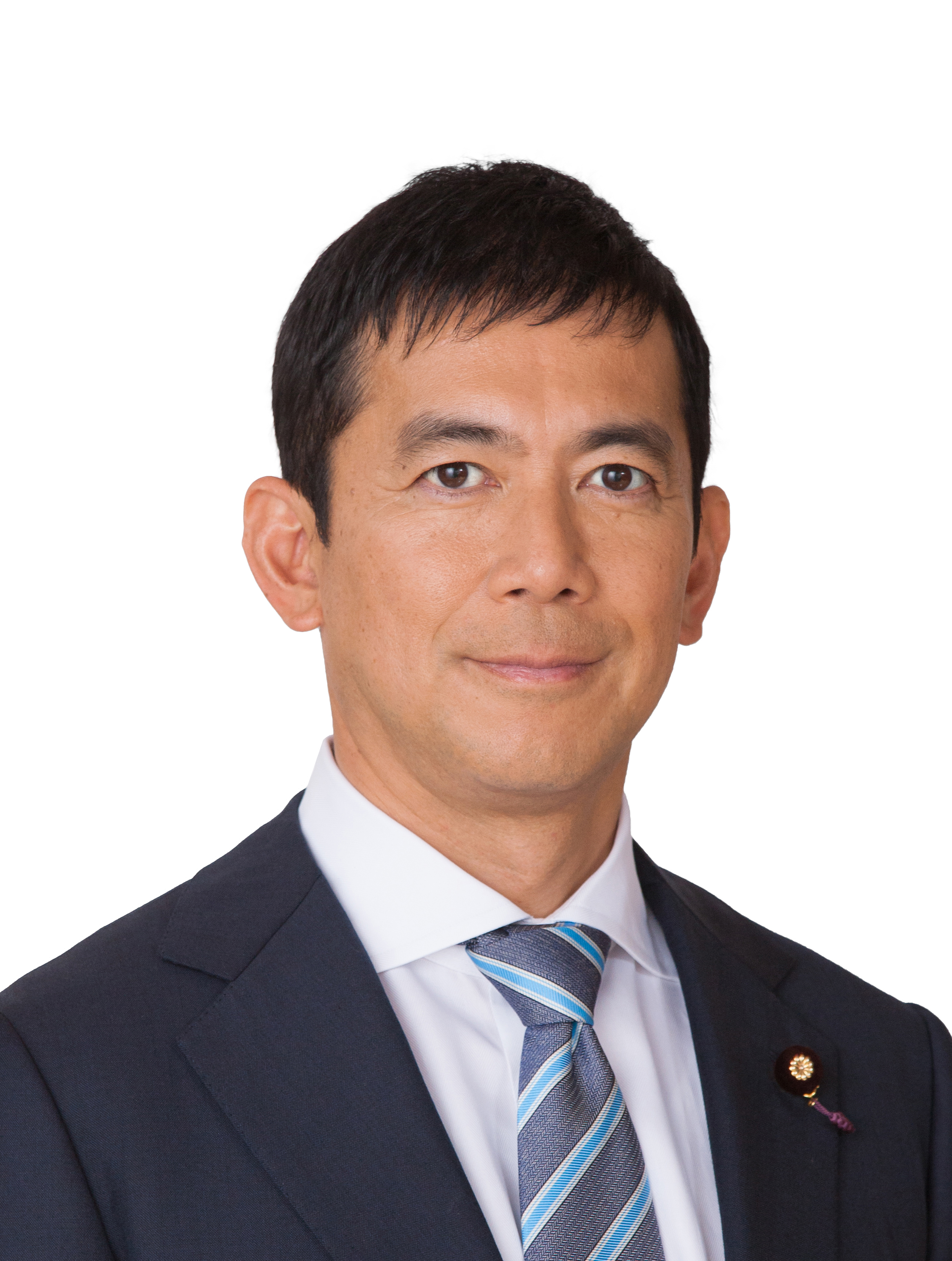
- Official portrait, 2016

Member of the House of Representatives
- Incumbent
- Assumed office 3 November 2021
- Preceded by: Hachiro Okonogi
- Constituency: Kanagawa 3rd

Member of the House of Councillors
- In office 26 July 2010 – 8 October 2021
- Preceded by: Yōichi Kaneko
- Succeeded by: Keiichiro Asao
- Constituency: Kanagawa at-large

Personal details
- Born: 4 January 1964 (age 62) Toshima, Tokyo, Japan
- Party: LDP (since 2016)
- Other political affiliations: Independent (before 2010; 2014–2016); Your Party (2010–2014)
- Education: University of Tokyo

Kenji Nakanishi (中西健治, Nakanishi Kenji; Born January 4, 1964) is a Japanese politician and member of the House of Representatives.

A former executive of JP Morgan Securities Japan, he was elected to the House of Councillors in 2010 as a member of Your Party for the Kanagawa at-large district, and he later joined the Liberal Democratic Party House of Councillors parliamentary group.

== Business career ==
Nakanishi was born in Tokyo, and after graduating from the faculty of law of the University of Tokyo, in 1988 he joined JP Morgan Securities Japan and in 2006 he rose to the position of Vice President.

== Political career ==
Nakanishi ran for mayor of Yokohama in 2009 as an independent, but effectively supported by the Liberal Democratic Party and Komeito. He narrowly lost the election to Fumiko Hayashi, who was supported by the Democratic Party of Japan and the People's New Party. He beat Masahiko Okada of the Japanese Communist Party, who also ran.

In 2010 he ran and was elected to the House of Councillors as a member of Your Party for the Kanagawa at-large district, defeating Keiko Chiba, who was then the Justice Minister in the DPJ government of Naoto Kan. In 2011 it was reported that he was the third-wealthiest member of the upper house, with assets of ¥258.7 million. He became policy chief for Your Party. Your Party was dissolved in November 2014, and Nakanishi joined the Liberal Democratic Party upper house parliamentary group. In the 2016 regular election, he was re-elected from Kanagawa as an independent with LDP endorsement with the fourth-most votes behind candidates from LDP, DP and Kōmeitō, and – Kanagawa's fourth seat was the last prefectural district seat countrywide to be called on election night – received retroactive nomination (tsuika kōnin) from the LDP, in effect giving the party two seats from Kanagawa in one election for the first time.
