= Ishin Seito Shimpu =

Restoration Political Party – New Wind: 維新政党・新風; Ishin Seitō・Shimpū
- President: Tetsuō Uotani
- Founded: 9 December 1995
- Ideology: Monarchism; Japanese nationalism
- Political position: Right-wing to far-right

Website
- www.shimpu.jpn.org

The Restoration Political Party – New Wind (維新政党・新風, Ishin Seitō Shimpū) is a minor right-wing Japanese political party. They support using the armed forces to defend Japan and increasing the authority of the Japanese emperor.

However it also invited to one of their discussions Kimura Mitsuhiro of another extreme right group Issuikai (一水会). Kimura made friends with politicians like Jean Marie Le Pen. One of Jean Marie Le Pen's rallies in France was discussed in one of Restoration Political Party New Wind's magazines.

== Logos ==

=== Councillors election results ===
House of Councillors
Election	Leader	Seats		Nationwide		Prefecture		Status
Election	Leader	Total (Note: The Upper house is split in two classes, one elected every three years.)	Contested	Number	%	Number	%	Status
2001	Tetsuō Uotani	0 / 242	0 / 121	59,385	0.11%	72,066	0.13%	Extra-parliamentary
2004	Tetsuō Uotani	0 / 242	0 / 121	128,478	0.23%	117,780	0.21%	Extra-parliamentary
2007	Tetsuō Uotani	0 / 242	0 / 121	170,510	0.29%	129,222	0.22%	Extra-parliamentary
2013	Nobuyuki Suzuki	0 / 242	0 / 121			157,971	0.30%	Extra-parliamentary
2016	Nobuyuki Suzuki	0 / 242	0 / 121			42,858	0.08%	Extra-parliamentary
2022	Tetsuō Uotani	0 / 245	0 / 125	65,107	0.12%	204,102	0.38%	Extra-parliamentary
