= Keiichiro Asao =

Japanese politician (born 1964)

- 浅尾 慶一郎
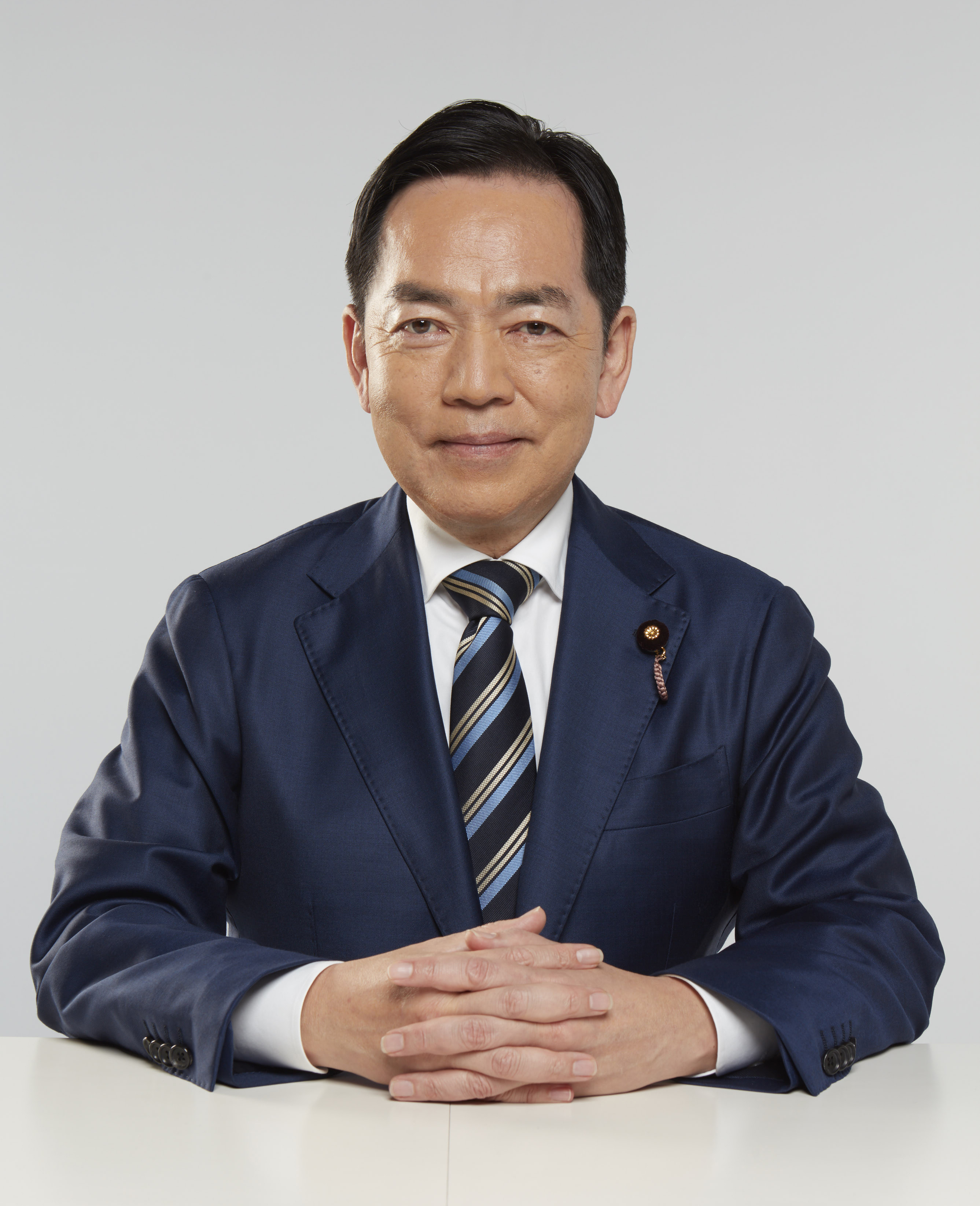
- Official portrait, 2023

Minister of the Environment
- In office 1 October 2024 – 21 October 2025
- Prime Minister: Shigeru Ishiba
- Preceded by: Shintaro Ito
- Succeeded by: Hirotaka Ishihara

Member of the House of Councillors
- Incumbent
- Assumed office 26 July 2022
- Preceded by: Kenji Nakanishi
- Constituency: Kanagawa at-large
- In office 26 July 1998 – 18 August 2009
- Preceded by: Fumio Saitō
- Succeeded by: Yōichi Kaneko
- Constituency: Kanagawa at-large

Member of the House of Representatives; from Southern Kanto
- In office 30 August 2009 – 28 September 2017
- Preceded by: Kazufumi Taniguchi
- Succeeded by: Yuki Waseda
- Constituency: PR block (2009–2012); Kanagawa 4th (2012–2017)

Personal details
- Born: 11 February 1964 (age 62) Tokyo, Japan
- Party: Liberal Democratic (since 2017)
- Other political affiliations: New Frontier (1996–1997); New Fraternity (1997–1998); Democratic (1998–2009); Your Party (2009–2014); Independent (2014–2017)
- Relatives: Mitani Takanobu (grandfather)
- Education: University of Tokyo; Stanford University (MBA)
- Website: https://asao.net/

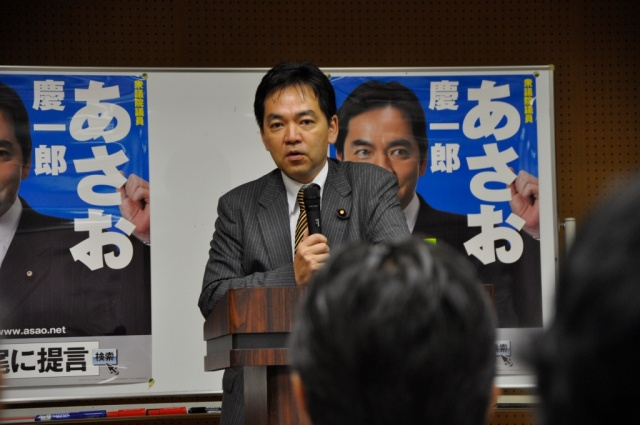
Asao in 2011

Keiichiro Asao (浅尾 慶一郎, Asao Keiichirō; born 11 February 1964) is a Japanese politician and a member of the House of Councillors in the Diet (national legislature).

He has been a member of the Democratic Party of Japan (DPJ), then of Your Party, then an independent. In September 2017, he applied to join the LDP.

A native of Tokyo and graduate of the law faculty of the University of Tokyo, he joined Industrial Bank of Japan in 1987, receiving MBA in 1992 from Stanford University while working at the bank. Leaving the bank in 1995, he was elected to the House of Councillors for the first time in 1998 to represent Kanagawa Prefecture. He was re-elected in 2004, and was appointed the Shadow Foreign Minister by the DPJ leader Seiji Maehara. He was later expelled from the DPJ after announcing he would run for a district seat in Kanagawa during the 2009 General election, joining Your Party as a founding member one month later. Taking helm of the party in April 2014 after a financial scandal touching its founder, he voted in favor of disbanding it in November 2014 over dissension against plans to support the LDP. In October 2016 however, Asao began voting with the LDP lower house fraction, and then joined the LDP in September 2017 after the announcement of anticipated elections by prime minister Abe.

Political offices
| Preceded by Shintaro Ito | Minister of the Environment; 2024–present | Incumbent |
