= Fumio Saito =

Japanese basketball player (1953–2019)

Personal information
- Nationality: Japanese
- Born: 22 August 1953; Tokyo, Japan
- Died: 25 March 2019 (aged 65)

Sport
- Sport: Basketball

Fumio Saito (斎藤 文夫, Saitō Fumio, 22 August 1953 – 25 March 2019) was a Japanese basketball player. He competed in the men's tournament at the 1976 Summer Olympics.
