= 2001 Liberal Democratic Party presidential election =

Political leadership election in Japan

- 24 April 2001
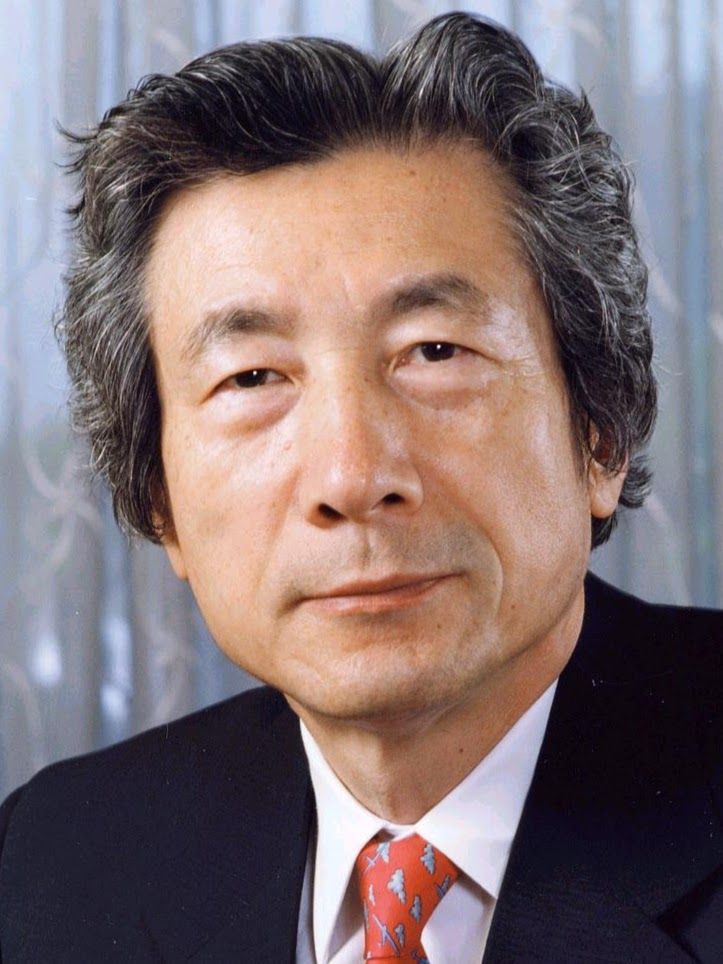

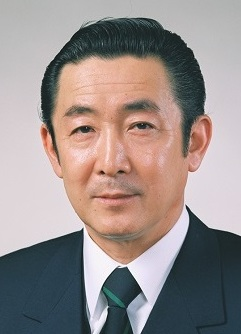

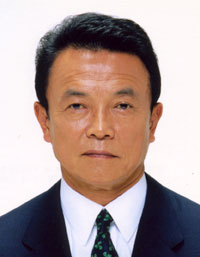

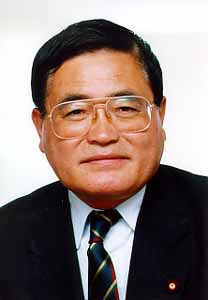
Candidate	Junichiro Koizumi	Ryutaro Hashimoto
Leader's seat	Kanagawa 11th	Okayama 4th
LDP MPs	175 (50.58%)	140 (40.46%)
Party members	123 (89.13%)	15 (10.87%)
Total	298 (61.57%)	155 (32.02%)
Candidate	Taro Aso	Shizuka Kamei
Leader's seat	Fukuoka 8th	Hiroshima 6th
LDP MPs	31 (8.96%)	-
Party members	0 (0.00%)	-
Total	31 (6.41%)	Withdrew
President before election
Yoshirō Mori
Elected President
Junichiro Koizumi

The 2001 Liberal Democratic Party presidential election was held on 24 April 2001 to elect the President of the Liberal Democratic Party of Japan.

== Overview ==
On 10 March 2001, Prime Minister Yoshirō Mori summoned the five top LDP officials to his office. At this meeting, Mori stated that "we will bring forward this autumn's LDP presidential election", effectively announcing his resignation. On March 13, at the LDP convention held at the Nippon Budokan, Mori announced, "We will hold an early presidential election". With the Tokyo Metropolitan Assembly election looming in June, the LDP's Tokyo Metropolitan Assembly members issued a protest statement expressing dissatisfaction with Mori's "confusing resignation announcement". However, with the convention over, the LDP began the process of electing the next president. Koizumi was elected.

As the election had occurred only to fill remainder of Mori's term, Koizumi's term would expire in September 2001. Mori asked Koga to "increase the local votes," and Koga replied, "I'll do it because it's the president's order," increasing the prefectural vote count from one to three. Shizuka Kamei, who had been running, concluded a policy agreement with Junichiro Koizumi and withdrew from the general election, supporting Koizumi instead (though after the election, Koizumi unilaterally reneged on all policy agreements). The date for the presidential election was then set for September, when the term of office expired. However, as a special measure, the party asked party members in the Diet whether they wanted to run prior to the announcement. Only one (Junichiro Koizumi) expressed interest in running. Therefore, Junichiro Koizumi was re-elected without a vote, and at the general meeting of both houses of the National Diet, which replaced the party convention on 10 August 2001, Junichiro Koizumi was reappointed as President.

Prefectural votes, which correspond to local votes, were expanded from one to three. Local primaries were held in 45 prefectures, excluding Hiroshima and Yamaguchi. The prefectural votes were awarded using a winner-take-all system, with the top candidate in the prefectural primary receiving three votes.

== Candidates ==
=== Declared ===
Candidate(s)	Date of birth	Current position	Party faction	Electoral district
Junichiro Koizumi	8 January 1942 (age 61)	Member of the House of Representatives (since 1972) Previous offices held: Minister of Health, Labour and Welfare (1988–1989; 1996–1998); Minister for Internal Affairs and Communications (1992–1993)	Seiwa Seisaku Kenkyūkai (Mori)	Kanagawa 11th
Ryutaro Hashimoto	29 July 1937 (age 63)	Member of the House of Representatives (since 1963) Previous offices held: Prime Minister (1996–1998); President of the Liberal Democratic Party (1996–1998); Deputy Prime Minister of Japan (1995–1996); Minister of International Trade and Industry (1994–1996); Minister of Finance (1989–1991); Secretary-General of the Liberal Democratic Party (1989); Minister of Transport (1986–1987); Minister of Health and Welfare (1978–1979)	Heisei Kenkyūkai (Hashimoto)	Okayama 4th
Tarō Asō	20 September 1940 (age 60)	Member of the House of Representatives (1979–1983, since 1986)	Daiyukai (Kōno)	Fukuoka 8th
Shizuka Kamei	1 November 1936 (age 66)	Member of the House of Representatives (since 1979) Previous offices held: Minister of Construction (1996–1997); Minister of Transport (1994–1995)	Shisuikai (Eto)	Hiroshima 6th

=== Recommenders ===
Party regulations require candidates to have the written support at least 20 Diet members, known as recommenders, to run.

Junichiro Koizumi

Leader of recommenders

- Masajuro Shiokawa (Member of the House of Representatives for Osaka 13th district) (Seiwakai)

Campaign Manager

- Hiroshi Mitsuzuka (Member of the House of Representatives for Miyagi 3rd district) (Seiwakai)

Recommenders

- Shozaburo Nakamura (Member of the House of Representatives for Chiba 12th district) (Seiwakai)
- Kosuke Ito (Member of the House of Representatives for Tokyo 23rd district) (Seiwakai)
- Kayoko Shimizu (Member of the House of Councillors from National PR block) (Seiwakai)
- Kunishige Kamamoto (Member of the House of Councillors from National PR block) (Seiwakai)
- Hiroo Nakashima (Member of the House of Councillors from National PR block) (Seiwakai)
- Taku Yamasaki (Member of the House of Representatives for Fukuoka 2nd district) (Kinmirai Seiji Kenkyūkai)
- Yoshiyuki Kamei (Member of the House of Representatives for Kanagawa 16th district) (Kinmirai Seiji Kenkyūkai)
- Akira Amari (Member of the House of Representatives for Kanagawa 13th district) (Kinmirai Seiji Kenkyūkai)
- Kisaburo Tokai (Member of the House of Representatives for Hyōgo 10th district) (Kinmirai Seiji Kenkyūkai)
- Kazunori Tanaka (Member of the House of Representatives for Kanagawa 10th district) (Kinmirai Seiji Kenkyūkai)
- Toshio Yamauchi (Member of the House of Councillors from Kagawa) (Kinmirai Seiji Kenkyūkai)
- Koichi Kato (Member of the House of Representatives for Yamagata 4th district) (Yūrinkai)
- Sadakazu Tanigaki (Member of the House of Representatives for Kyoto 5th district) (Yūrinkai)
- Gen Nakatani (Member of the House of Representatives for Kōchi 2nd district) (Yūrinkai)
- Koichi Kishi (Member of the House of Councillors from Yamagata) (Yūrinkai)
- Junzo Iwasaki (Member of the House of Councillors from Tochigi) (Banchōken)
- Makiko Tanaka (Member of the House of Representatives for Niigata 5th district) (no faction)
- Katsuei Hirasawa (Member of the House of Representatives for Tokyo 17th district) (Heiseiken)
Ryutaro Hashimoto

Leader of recommenders

- Osamu Takatori (Member of the House of Representatives for Hokuriku-Shin'etsu PR block) (Heiseiken)

Campaign Manager

- Hiromu Nonaka (Member of the House of Representatives for Kyoto 4th district) (Heiseiken)

Recommenders

- Fumio Kyūma (Member of the House of Representatives for Nagasaki 2nd district) (Heiseiken)
- Hosei Norota (Member of the House of Representatives for Akita 2nd district) (Heiseiken)
- Tadahiro Matsushita (Member of the House of Representatives for Kyushu PR block) (Heiseiken)
- Takamori Yoshikawa (Member of the House of Representatives for Hokkaido 2nd district) (Heiseiken)
- Makoto Taki (Member of the House of Representatives for Nara 2nd district) (Heiseiken)
- Masatoshi Kurata (Member of the House of Representatives for Tōkai PR block) (Heiseiken)
- Yūko Obuchi (Member of the House of Representatives for Gunma 5th district) (Heiseiken)
- Juro Saito (Member of the House of Councillors from Mie) (Heiseiken)
- Shigenobu Sakano (Member of the House of Councillors from Tottori) (Heiseiken)
- Yutaka Okano (Member of the House of Councillors from National PR block) (no faction)
- Mitsuhiro Uesugi (Member of the House of Councillors from Miyazaki) (Banchōken)
- Ryotaro Sudo (Member of the House of Councillors from National PR block) (Heiseiken)
- Shuntaro Kageyama (Member of the House of Councillors from Shimane) (Heiseiken)
- Yuya Niwa (Member of the House of Representatives for Ibaraki 6th district) (Shin Zaisei Kenkyūkai)
- Yoshitaka Murata (Member of the House of Representatives for Okayama 5th district) (Shin Zaisei Kenkyūkai)
- Ichizo Miyamoto (Member of the House of Representatives for Hyōgo 9th district) (Shin Zaisei Kenkyūkai)
- Ichiro Ichikawa (Member of the House of Councillors from Miyagi) (Shin Zaisei Kenkyūkai)
- Keisuke Sunada (Member of the House of Representatives for Kinki PR block) (Banchōken)
Tarō Asō

Leader of recommenders

- Hideyuki Aizawa (Member of the House of Representatives for Tottori 2nd district) (Daiyukai)

Campaign Manager

- Yozo Ishikawa (Member of the House of Representatives for Tokyo 25th district) (Daiyukai)

Recommenders

- Tsuneo Suzuki (Member of the House of Representatives for Kanagawa 7th district) (Daiyukai)
- Eisuke Mori (Member of the House of Representatives for Chiba 11th district) (Daiyukai)
- Katsuhito Asano (Member of the House of Representatives for Aichi 14th district) (Daiyukai)
- Takeshi Iwaya (Member of the House of Representatives for Ōita 3rd district) (Daiyukai)
- Hideo Usui (Member of the House of Representatives for Chiba 1st district) (Banchōken)
- Norihiko Akagi (Member of the House of Representatives for Ibaraki 1st district) (Banchōken)
- Akira Shichijo (Member of the House of Representatives for Shikoku PR block) (Banchōken)
- Seiko Noda (Member of the House of Representatives for Gifu 1st district) (Banchōken)
- Mayumi Moriyama (Member of the House of Representatives for Northern Kanto PR block) (Banchōken)
- Yoshiro Hayashi (Member of the House of Representatives for Chūgoku PR block) (Shin Zaisei Kenkyūkai)
- Shun'ichi Suzuki (Member of the House of Representatives for Iwate 2nd district) (Shin Zaisei Kenkyūkai)
- Kazuna Matsumoto (Member of the House of Representatives for Chiba 7th district) (Heiseiken)
- Hiroyuki Arai (Member of the House of Representatives for Tohoku PR block) (no faction)
- Hiroyuki Morishita (Member of the House of Councillors from Kōchi) (no faction)
- Shunichi Yamaguchi (Member of the House of Representatives for Tokushima 2nd district) (no faction)
- Hachiro Okonogi (Member of the House of Representatives for Kanagawa 3rd district) (no faction)
- Yasukazu Hamada (Member of the House of Representatives for Southern Kanto PR block) (no faction)
- Yoshitada Konoike (Member of the House of Councillors from Hyōgo) (no faction)
Shizuka Kamei

Leader of recommenders

- Yasuhiro Nakasone (Member of the House of Representatives for Northern Kanto PR block) (Shisuikai)

Campaign Manager

- Takami Eto (Member of the House of Representatives for Miyazaki 2nd district) (Shisuikai)

Recommenders

- Shizuo Satō (Member of the House of Representatives for Hokkaido 4th district) (Shisuikai)
- Keiji Furuya (Member of the House of Representatives for Gifu 5th district) (Shisuikai)
- Takeo Kawamura (Member of the House of Representatives for Yamaguchi 3rd district) (Shisuikai)
- Toshikatsu Matsuoka (Member of the House of Representatives for Kumamoto 3rd district) (Shisuikai)
- Kōki Kobayashi (Member of the House of Representatives for Tokyo 10th district) (Shisuikai)
- Yukihiro Yoshida (Member of the House of Representatives for Tōkai PR block) (Shisuikai)
- Isao Matsumiya (Member of the House of Representatives for Fukui 1st district) (Shisuikai)
- Yoshitake Masuhara (Member of the House of Representatives for Hiroshima 3rd district) (Shisuikai)
- Shonosuke Hayashi (Member of the House of Representatives for Kinki PR block) (Shisuikai)
- Kyoko Nishikawa (Member of the House of Representatives for Kyushu PR block) (Shisuikai)
- Hiroyuki Kurata (Member of the House of Councillors from Chiba) (Shisuikai)
- Yasu Kano (Member of the House of Councillors from Ibaraki) (Shisuikai)
- Sanzo Hosaka (Member of the House of Councillors from Tokyo) (Shisuikai)
- Tsuyako Ohno (Member of the House of Councillors from Gifu) (Shisuikai)
- Hirohide Uozumi (Member of the House of Councillors from Kumamoto) (Shisuikai)
- Tomoharu Yoda (Member of the House of Councillors from National PR block) (Shisuikai)
- Taro Nakayama (Member of the House of Representatives for Osaka 18th district) (no faction)
- Hideki Miyazaki (Member of the House of Councillors from National PR block) (no faction)

Number of supporters by factions

Candidates	Junichiro Koizumi	Ryutaro Hashimoto	Taro Aso	Shizuka Kamei
Banchō Seisaku Kenkyūjo	1	2	5	0
Heisei Kenkyūkai	1	13	1	0
Daiyukai	0	0	6	0
Kinmirai Seiji Kenkyūkai	6	0	0	0
Seiwa Seisaku Kenkyūkai	7	0	0	0
Shin Zaisei Kenkyūkai	0	4	2	0
Shisuikai	0	0	0	18
Yūrinkai	4	0	0	0
No faction	1	1	6	2

== Results ==
Full results
Candidate	Diet members		Party members				Total points	
Candidate	Votes	%	Popular votes	%	Allocated votes	%	Total votes	%
Junichiro Koizumi 当	175	50.58%			123	89.13%	298	61.57%
Ryutaro Hashimoto	140	40.46%			15	10.87%	155	32.02%
Taro Aso	31	8.96%			0	0.00%	31	6.41%
~~Shizuka Kamei~~ (Note: Withdrew after prefectural vote counting.)	0	0.00%			0	0.00%	0	0.00%
Total	346	100.00%			138	100.00%	484	100.00%
Valid votes	346	100.00%			138	97.87%	484	99.38%
Invalid and blank votes	0	0.00%			3	2.13%	3	0.62%
Turnout	346	100.00%			141	100.00%	487	100.00%
Registered voters	346	100.00%			141	100.00%	487	100.00%

=== Results of Party Members' Votes by Prefecture ===
Results of Party Members' Votes by Prefecture
Prefecture	Junichiro Koizumi			Ryutaro Hashimoto			Tarō Asō			Shizuka Kamei		
Prefecture	Votes	%		Votes	%		Votes	%		Votes	%	
Aichi									0			0
Akita									0			0
Aomori									0			0
Chiba									0			0
Ehime									0			0
Fukui									0			0
Fukuoka									0			0
Fukushima									0			0
Gifu									0			0
Gunma									0			0
Hiroshima (Note: Hiroshima didn't hold a primary election and voted for Kamei. These votes were annulled after Kamei withdrew from the election.)	No votes		0	No votes		0	No votes		0	No votes		~~3~~
Hokkaido									0			0
Hyōgo									0			0
Ibaraki									0			0
Ishikawa									0			0
Iwate									0			0
Kagawa									0			0
Kagoshima									0			0
Kanagawa	27,077	77.04%	3	3,432	9.76%	0	3,805	10.83%	0	618	1.76%	0
Kōchi									0			0
Kumamoto									0			0
Kyoto									0			0
Mie									0			0
Miyagi									0			0
Miyazaki									0			0
Nagano									0			0
Nagasaki									0			0
Nara									0			0
Niigata									0			0
Ōita									0			0
Okayama			0			3			0			0
Okinawa									0			0
Osaka									0			0
Saga									0			0
Saitama									0			0
Shiga									0			0
Shimane									0			0
Shizuoka									0			0
Tochigi									0			0
Tokushima									0			0
Tokyo									0			0
Tottori									0			0
Toyama									0			0
Wakayama									0			0
Yamagata									0			0
Yamaguchi (Note: Yamaguchi didn't hold a primary election.)	No votes			No votes			No votes		0	No votes		0
Yamanashi									0			0
Total			123			15			0			0
