= List of female cabinet ministers of Japan =

The current Cabinet of Japan, Second Takaichi cabinet (Reshuffled), has 16 male officers and 3 female officers, including Sanae Takaichi, Satsuki Katayama and Kimi Onoda.

denotes the first female minister of that particular department.

Minister	Position	Year Appointed	Administration
Prime Minister
Sanae Takaichi	Prime Minister	2025	Takaichi Cabinet
Minister of Internal Affairs and Communications
Yuriko Koike	Minister of State for Okinawa and Northern Territories Affairs	2004	Koizumi II
Sanae Takaichi	Minister of State for Okinawa and Northern Territories Affairs	2006	Koizumi III
Sanae Takaichi	Minister of Internal Affairs and Communications	2014	Abe II, III and IV
Seiko Noda	Minister of Internal Affairs and Communications	2017	Abe III and IV
Minister of Justice
Ritsuko Nagao	Minister of Justice	1996	Hashimoto I
Mayumi Moriyama	Minister of Justice	2001	Koizumi I
Chieko Nono	Minister of Justice	2004	Koizumi II
Keiko Chiba	Minister of Justice	2009	Hatoyama and Kan
Midori Matsushima	Minister of Justice	2014	Abe II
Yōko Kamikawa	Minister of Justice	2014, 2017, 2020	S. Abe II, III, IV and Suga
Masako Mori	Minister of Justice	2019	Abe IV
Minister of Foreign Affairs
Makiko Tanaka	Minister of Foreign Affairs	2001	Koizumi I
Yoriko Kawaguchi	Minister of Foreign Affairs	2002	Koizumi II
Yōko Kamikawa	Minister of Foreign Affairs	2023	Kishida II (R2)
Minister of Finance
Satsuki Katayama	Minister of Finance	2025	Takaichi Cabinet
Minister of Education, Culture, Sports, Science and Technology
Tsuruyo Kondo	Minister of State for Science and Technology	1962	
Akiko Santo	Minister of State for Science and Technology	1990	
Mayumi Moriyama	Minister of Education, Science, Sport and Culture	1992	
Ryōko Akamatsu	Minister of Education	1993	
Makiko Tanaka	Minister of State for Science and Technology	1994	
Seiko Noda	Minister of Post and Telecommunication	1996	
Atsuko Toyama	Minister of State for Science and Technology	2001	
Seiko Noda	Minister of State for Science and Technology	2008	
Makiko Tanaka	Minister of Education, Culture, Sports, Science and Technology	2012	
Keiko Nagaoka	Minister of Education, Culture, Sports, Science and Technology; Minister in charge of Education Rebuilding	2022	Kishida II (R1)
Toshiko Abe	Minister of Education, Culture, Sports, Science and Technology	2024	Ishiba
Minister of Health, Labour and Welfare
Masa Nakayama	Minister of Health and Social Welfare	1960	Ikeda I
Yoko Komiyama	Minister of Health and Social Welfare	2011	Noda
Minister of Agriculture, Forestry and Fisheries
None
Minister of Economy, Trade and Industry
Yuko Obuchi	Minister of Economy, Trade and Industry	2014	Shinzo Abe
Minister of Land, Infrastructure, Transport and Tourism
Chikage Ogi	Minister of Construction	2000	
Chikage Ogi	Minister of State for the National Land	2000	
Chikage Ogi	Minister of Land, Infrastructure and Transport	2000	
Minister of Environment
Shigeru Ishimoto	Minister of State for Environment	1984	
Mayumi Moriyama	Minister of State for Environment	1989	
Wakako Hironaka	Minister of State for Environment	1993	
Toshiko Hamayotsu	Minister of State for Environment	1994	
Michiko Ishii	Minister of State for Environment	1996	
Kayoko Shimizu	Minister of State for Environment	1999	
Yoriko Kawaguchi	Minister of State for Environment	2000	
Yoriko Kawaguchi	Minister of Environment	2001	
Yuriko Koike	Minister of Environment	2003	
Tamayo Marukawa	Minister of Environment	2015	Shinzo Abe
Minister of Defense
Yuriko Koike	Minister of Defense	2007	
Tomomi Inada	Minister of Defense	2016	
Chief Cabinet Secretary
Mayumi Moriyama	Chief Cabinet Secretary	1989	Toshiki Kaifu
Minister for Reconstruction
Shinako Tsuchiya	Minister of Reconstruction; Minister in charge of Comprehensive Policy Coordination for Revival from the Nuclear Accident at Fukushima	2023	Kishida II (R2)
Chairman of the National Public Safety Commission
Tomiko Okazaki	Chairman of the National Public Safety Commission	2010	
Eriko Yamatani	Chairman of the National Public Safety Commission	2014	S. Abe II (R) and III
Minister of State
Sanae Takaichi	Minister of State for Food Safety	2006	
Seiko Noda	Minister of State for Consumer Affairs and Food Safety	2008	
Mizuho Fukushima	Minister of State for Consumer Affairs and Food Safety	2009	
Sumiko Takahara	Minister of State for Economic Planning	1989	
Manae Kubota	Minister of State for Economic Planning	1993	
Sanae Takaichi	Minister of State for Innovation	2006	
Sanae Takaichi	Minister of State for Science and Technology Policy	2006	
Hiroko Ota	Minister of State for Economic and Fiscal Policy	2006	
Renho Murata	Minister of State of Administrative Reform	2010	
Renho Murata	Minister of State of Administrative Reform	2012	
Tomomi Inada	Minister of State of Administrative Reform	2012	
Chieko Nono	Minister of State for Measures for the Declining Birthrate	2004	
Sanae Takaichi	Minister of State for Measures for the Declining Birthrate and Social Affairs	2006	
Yoko Kamikawa	Minister of State for Measures for the Declining Birthrate and Social Affairs	2007	
Masako Mori	Minister of State for Measures for the Declining Birthrate	2012	
Yuko Obuchi	Minister of State for Social Affairs and Gender Equality	2008	
Mizuho Fukushima	Minister of State for Social Affairs and Gender Equality	2009	
Masako Mori	Minister of State for Gender Equality	2012	
Haruko Arimura	Minister of State for Gender Equality	2014	
Tamayo Marukawa	Minister of State for the Tokyo Olympic and Paralympic Games	2016, 2021	S. Abe III (R2) and Suga
Seiko Hashimoto	Minister of State for the Tokyo Olympic and Paralympic Games; Minister of State for Gender Equality	2020	Suga
Tamayo Marukawa	Minister of State for Gender Equality	2021	Suga
Noriko Horiuchi	Minister of State for the Tokyo Olympic and Paralympic Games; Minister in charge of Promoting Vaccinations	2021	Kishida I, II
Karen Makishima	Minister for Digital Transformation; Minister in charge of Administrative Reform; Minister of State for Regulatory Reform	2021	Kishida I, II
Seiko Noda	Minister of State for Regional Revitalization; Minister of State for Measures for Declining Birthrate; Minister of State for Gender Equality; Minister in charge of Women's Empowerment; Minister in charge of Policies Related to Children; Minister in charge of Measures for Loneliness and Isolation	2021	Kishida I, II
Ayuko Kato	Minister in charge of Policies Related to Children; Minister in charge of Cohesive Society; Minister in charge of Women's Empowerment; Minister in charge of Measures for Loneliness and Isolation; Minister of State for Measures for Declining Birthrate; Minister of State for Gender Equality	2023	Kishida II (R2)
Sanae Takaichi	Minister in charge of Economic Security; Minister of State for "Cool Japan" Strategy; Minister of State for Intellectual Property Strategy; Minister of State for Science and Technology Policy; Minister of State for Space Policy; Minister of State for Economic Security	2022	Kishida II (R1) (R2)
Hanako Jimi	Minister of State for Okinawa and Northern Territories Affairs; Minister of State for Regional Revitalization; Minister of State for Regulatory Reform; Minister of State for Ainu-Related Policies; Minister in charge of Digital Garden City Nation Vision; Minister for the World Expo 2025	2023	Kishida II (R2)
Junko Mihara	Minister of State for Policies Related to Children; Minister of State for Measures for Declining Birthrate; Minister of State for Youth's Empowerment; Minister of State for Gender Equality; Minister in charge of Women's Empowerment; Minister in charge of Cohesive Society; Minister in charge of Measures for Loneliness and Isolation	2024	Ishiba
Kimi Onoda	Minister of State for Economic Security; Minister of State for a Society of Well-Ordered and Harmonious Coexistence with Foreign Nationals; Minister of State for "Cool Japan" Strategy; Minister of State for Intellectual Property Strategy; Minister of State for Science and Technology Policy; Minister of State for Space Policy; Minister of State for AI Strategy; Minister of State for Economic Security	2025	Takaichi

== See also ==
- Cabinet
- Cabinet of Japan
- Politics of Japan
