= Democratic backsliding in Asia by country =

This article discusses instances of democratic backsliding by country in Asia. Democratic backsliding is the process of a country losing democratic qualities over time.

== Armenia ==
The National Interest has stated that despite high hopes after the 2018 Armenian Revolution, Armenia has backslided quickly, especially after the snap 2021 parliamentary election.

Under the rule of Nikol Pashinyan, large-scale measures against political dissents, human rights activists, and journalists increased. Pashinyan began persecuting members of the previous cabinet on politically motivated charges, such as two former defense ministers Seyran Ohanyan (for embezzlement) and David Tonoyan (as part of an investigation to the supplying of an outdated missile to the Armed Forces of Armenia).

The democratic backsliding worsened especially after the 2021 parliamentary election, after which the government continued to find "the enemies of the people". Media freedom remained restricted and arrests against journalists increased in 2022. The Armenian diaspora has been especially targeted, with authorities refusing to allow Mourad Papazian, a French chairman of a diaspora organization, into the country due to his involvement in anti-Pashinyan protests in Paris in July 2022. On 1 August, two Dutch-Armenians, Massis Abrahamian and Suneh Abrahamian, also spoke out against the government and were designated persona non grata in Armenia.

Members of the opposition Armenian Revolutionary Federation (Dashnaktsutyun) have also been targeted. It was revealed in May 2022 that the Armenian government under Pashinyan unlawfully installed the Predator spyware against journalists, dissidents, and human rights activists and hacked devices of several opposition leaders

In January 2023, Artavazd Margaryan, head of the faction, was detained for 72 hours along with party activist Gerasim Vardanyan. Margaryan's lawyer mocked the detention as illegal. Film producer and opposition supporter Armen Grigorian was put in pre-trial custody despite committing no crimes and died in July 2022 as his immune system got worse.

== Bangladesh ==
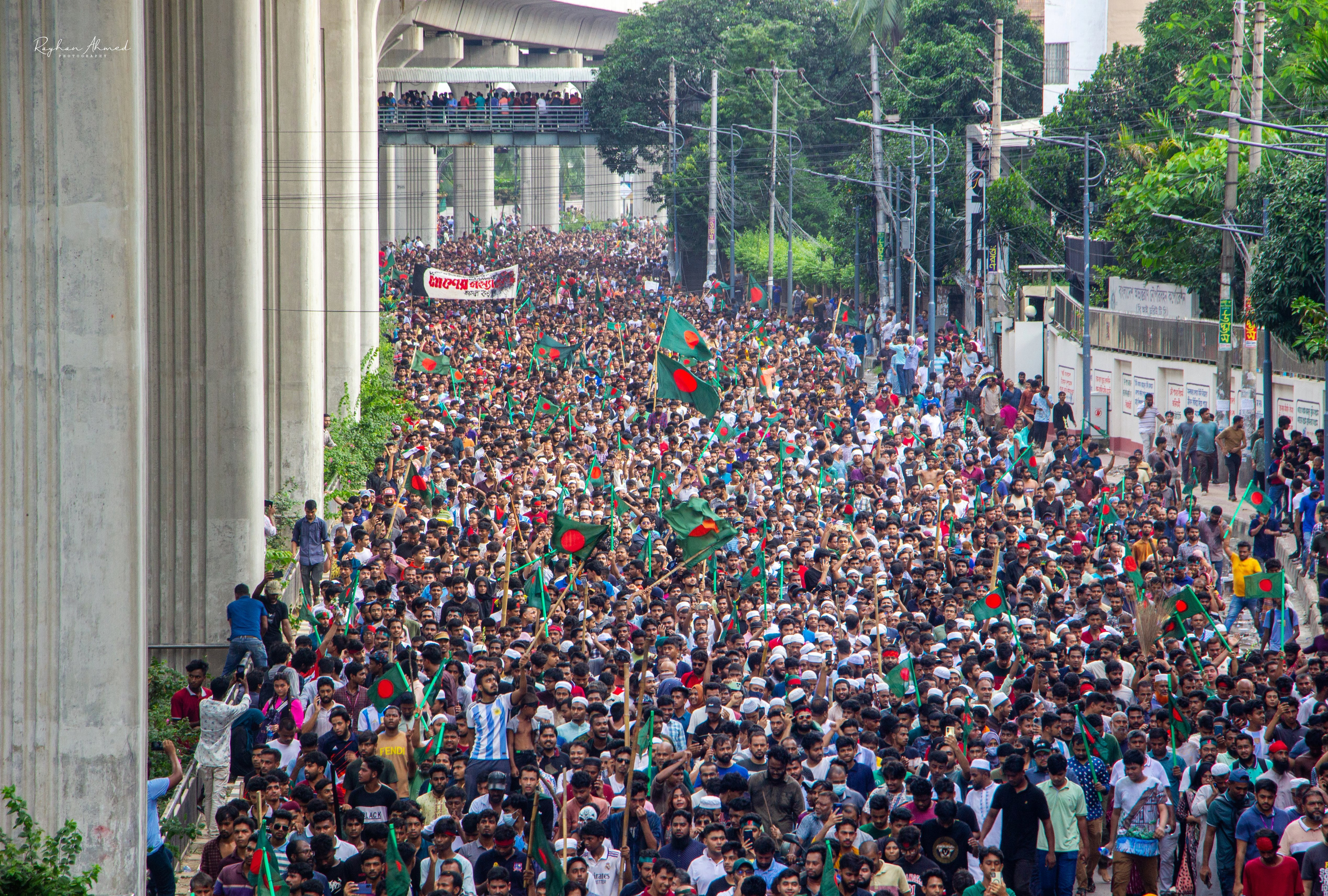
Victory march by protesters after the resignation of Sheikh Hasina in 2024

Bangladesh has faced multiple episodes of democratic backsliding since its transition to parliamentary rule in 1991. At first, Bangladesh's democratisation was very promising with the media becoming freer and an independent judiciary being promised by all parties. However, the two main parties, the Bangladesh Nationalist Party (BNP) and Awami League (AL) showed a lack of respect for democratic rules, undermining the legitimacy of elections by refusing election results. In late 1994, the opposition Awami League resigned from parliament, demanding for a caretaker government system to oversee elections. This change was refused by the incumbent BNP which insisted the AL adhere to the constitution.

The authoritarian behaviour increased significantly in late 1995. While the opposition AL endorsed violence by their supporters, the incumbent BNP used heavy-handed measures to restrict civil liberties against the opposition. Although this ended with the BNP gaining complete control of the parliament in February 1996, a caretaker government system was finally implemented, potentially paving the way for more peaceful transitions of power. However, an extreme concentration of power in the post of the prime minister developed where they concurrently held several offices: the leader of the House, leader of the majority party in parliament, and chief of the party. Article 70 of the constitution also allowed the prime minister to revoke the membership of members of parliament if they vote against their own party or abstain from sitting or voting. Violence by parties' supporters continued.

On 17 May 2004, an amendment to the constitution allowed the previous Chief Justice to be eligible for the head of the caretaker government and Bangladesh started to transition into a competitive authoritarian regime where democratic institutions are viewed as exercising political authority but are violated by incumbents and elections become farcical. During this system, corruption became institutionalised and anti-corruption mechanisms were used against the political opposition. In October 2006, when a new caretaker government was about to be appointed, the opposition parties did not accept the immediate past Chief Justice and the president became the head of state. In the 2006–2008 Bangladeshi political crisis, the BNP tried to influence the 2007 election and activists violently demonstrated with much condoning from the political parties. The military intervened, but political pressure forced the military to host an election at the end of 2008, which was won by the Awami League.

After Sheikh Hasina won the 2008 election, Bangladesh began to backslide into an electoral autocracy where the elections are noncompetitive and not free or fair. This process started with the 15th amendment to the constitution which removed the caretaker government system, allowing for the AL to dominate state institutions and future elections. It removed uncertainty in election results, allowing unchecked electoral fraud. The removal of the caretaker government was based on a Supreme Court ruling in May 2011 which was declared unconstitutional. The opposition criticised the removal of this system and boycotted the 2014 general election. Because of this boycott, more than half the parliament was elected unopposed and Bangladesh became a de facto one-party state, even when the Jatiya Party was declared to be the official opposition. The 2018 election results only increased the AL coalition's dominance to 288 out of 300 seats, although opposition parties participated. The election was condemned as "farcical" and "transparently fraudulent" by international media. Main opposition party BNP and others labelled it the "Midnight Election". They claimed that the ballot boxes were filled at night in favour of the incumbent Awami League. It was considered the biggest backsliding of Bangladeshi Democracy.

In addition, the AL brought frivolous charges and court battles against the opposition, particularly against the BNP. While former Prime Minister and BNP Chairperson Khaleda Zia had 36 cases filed against her and was sentenced to 5 years in prison in a graft case in February 2018, the courts dropped all cases against Hasina filed during the BNP government in May 2010. Freedom of expression also declined significantly with the Information and Communication Technology Act, 2006 allowing charges against people who publish material which is "false", "prejudicial to the state or person" and/or "hurt religious beliefs". However, there were no defined offences until an amendment in 2013 defined a steep penalty at 14 years imprisonment and a fine of 10,000,000 (1 crore) taka which has been used to legally and extra legally charge human rights defenders, journalists, newspapers, editors and other media organisations. Another act restricting freedom of expression, the Digital Security Act, 2018, also criminalised many forms of legitimate freedom of expression and dissent.

Extrajudicial killings and enforced disappearances, collectively termed as "crossfire", increased significantly. Furthermore, the AL tightened control over various institutions, especially onto the courts after 2014. The 16th amendment to the constitution allowed the parliament to impeach Supreme Court judges for incapability and misconduct, leading to the 21st Chief Justice of Bangladesh Surendra Kumar Sinha to resign and be exiled.

Bangladesh's increasing autocratization was cited by political observers as a key factor behind the Student–People's uprising in 2024. The movement successfully ousted Hasina who resigned and fled to India in self-imposed exile.

== Cambodia ==
In July 1997, Hun Sen seized power after months of tension and a grenade attack against the FUNCINPEC party, tightening his grip on power ever since by cracking down on the opposition. 20 years later, another opposition party, the Cambodia National Rescue Party, was dissolved after it was expected to gain sufficient support to win over Hun Sen's Cambodian People's Party. Party leader Kem Sokha was charged with treason, and many other opposition leaders fled or were banned from politics. This caused the CPP to dominate the parliament.

Vitit Muntarbhorn, who was appointed as the UN Special Rapporteur on the situation of human rights in Cambodia in 2021, warned that Cambodia had been backsliding since the 1991 Paris Peace Agreements, especially since the COVID-19 pandemic, during which the government cracked down criticism on its response by arresting hundreds of people and handing prison sentences of over 20 years under a draconian law.

== India ==
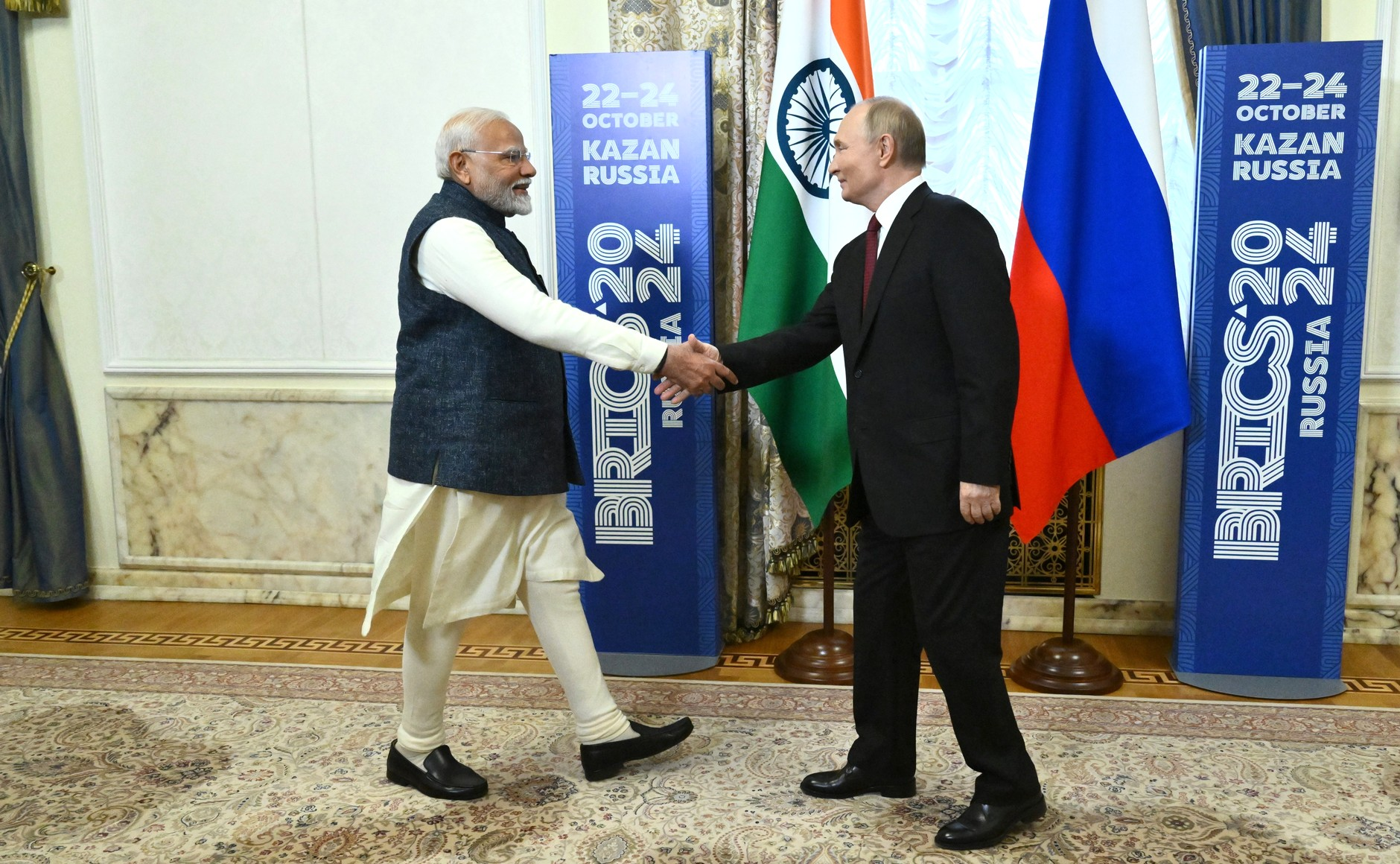
Indian Prime Minister Narendra Modi with Russian President Vladimir Putin at the 16th BRICS Summit in Russia, October 2024

The V-Dem Democracy Indices found that democratic backsliding is taking place in India under prime minister Narendra Modi and the ruling Bharatiya Janata Party (BJP), citing the passage of the 2019 Citizenship (Amendment) Act and the government's subsequent response to the Citizenship Amendment Act protests. It also accused the Indian government of attempting to "stifle critics in the media and academia".

In 2020, the V-Dem Institute identified India as one of five severe cases of democratic backsliding, relating to disproportionate limitations being placed upon the role of the Parliament of India through measures responding to the COVID-19 pandemic. This, they asserted, may lead to an "increased danger of power abuse by the executive". As of their Democracy Report 2021, V-Dem lists India as an electoral autocracy, with significant downward movement to a number of indicators. According to V-Dem, "In general, the Modi-led government in India has used laws on sedition, defamation, and counterterrorism to silence critics. In addition, critics have also accused him of arresting rival politicians to combat his opposition. A major politician that was arrested for corruption under him was Chief Minister of Delhi Arvind Kejriwal, a prominent opponent of Modi and the BJP." In 2023, it referred to India as "one of the worst autocratisers in the last 10 years". According to V-Dem's Democracy Report 2025, India ranked at 100 of 179 countries globally.

Foreign policy commentator Jonah Blank has described the 2019 revocation of the special status of Jammu and Kashmir as an example of the "slow transmogrification of democracy" under the Modi government.

Indian lawyer Gautam Bhatia asserts that the Indian government has taken advantage of "vaguely worded" legislative clauses, some of a "colonial vintage", to effectively bypass the "deliberative organ" (the legislature) in relation to COVID-19. Some of these laws, he further asserted, technically hold "formal statutory backing", making it more difficult for the legislature to oppose executive power.

According to the Democracy Index of the Economist Intelligence Unit (EIU), India is a flawed democracy. The EIU downgraded India from 51st place to 53rd place in their 2020 Democracy Index, citing "democratic backsliding" and "crackdowns" on civil liberties.

In its 2021 Democracy under Siege report, Freedom House downgraded India from "free" to "partly free", citing the response to the Citizenship Amendment Act protests. In 2023, according to the Freedom in the World report by Freedom House, India was classified as a "partly free" country for the third consecutive year.

== Indonesia ==
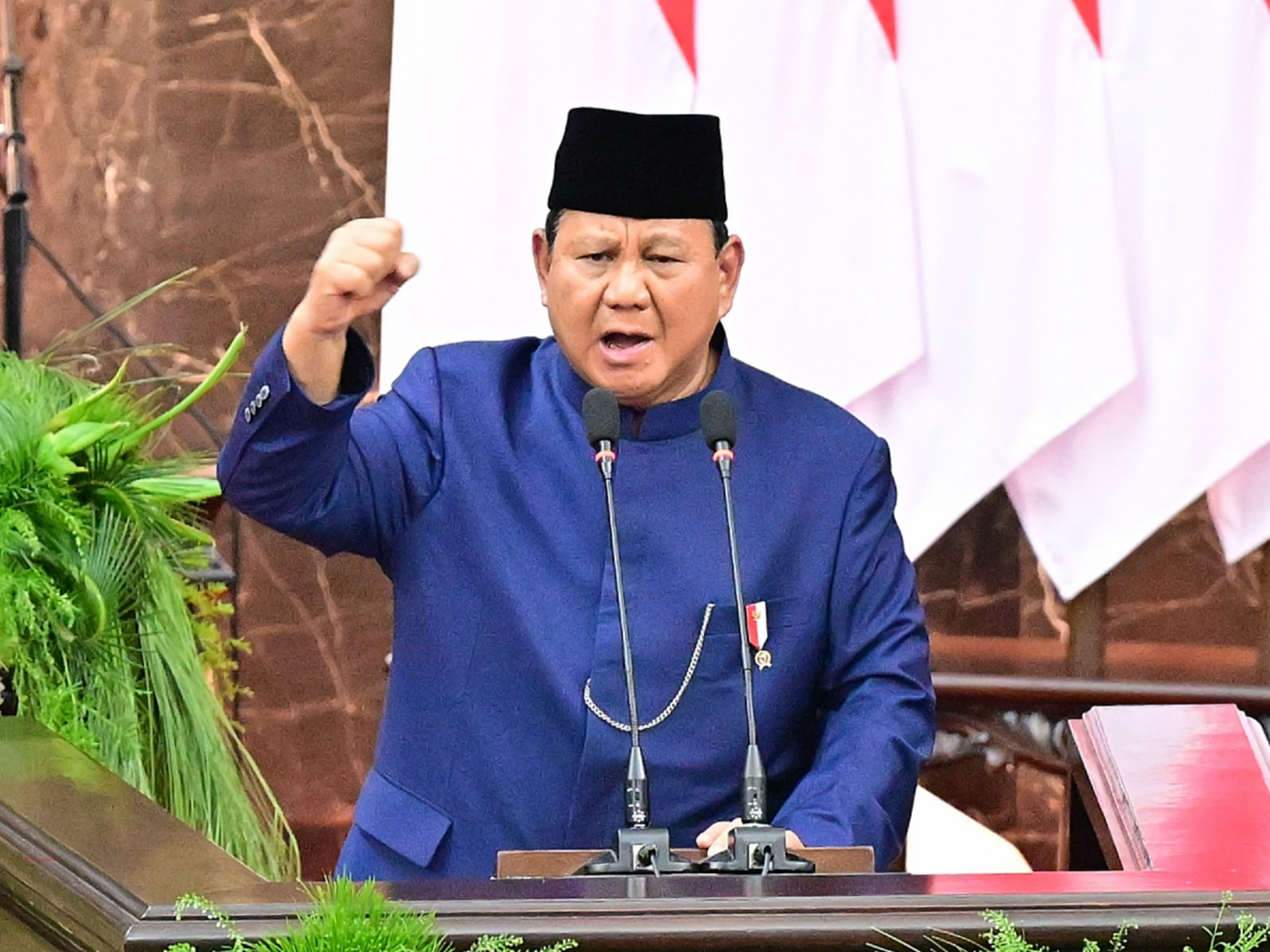
Indonesian President Prabowo Subianto in October 2024

There have been concerns of declining freedom of expression during the first term of the Joko Widodo administration, evidenced by the arrest, detainment, and imprisonment of many people for their social media activity being interpreted as an "insult" to the president.

On 10 June 2020, Human Rights Watch urged the Indonesian authorities to drop all charges against seven Papuan activists and students, who are on trial for their involvement in anti-racism protests in August 2019. On 2 December 2019, four students along with the other 50 students, peacefully protested against the human rights abuses in Papua and West Papua, asking the Indonesian government to release the Papuan political prisoners. A civil lawsuit was filed against 4 student activists following their expulsion from their university. On 13 July 2020, the police charged one of the four students with "treason" and "public provocation." Human Rights Watch urged the Indonesia's Khairun University to reinstate the four students who were expelled and support academic freedom and free expression.

The Ministry of Communications and Information is often criticized for its censorship, as it blocks websites "to protect its citizen from hoax" [sic]. In 2020, the Director General Ministry Semuel Abrijani Pangerapan and Johnny G. Plate introduced a law that requires foreign companies to register under the Electronic System Operator list which could give the government access to the citizen's personal info and threaten the company to block access from the country if the company did not register. The law was revised and passed in 2021. In July 2022, a ban was implemented for several notable websites such as PayPal, Epic Games, Steam, Origin, and Yahoo, and games such as Counter-Strike: Global Offensive and Dota 2 as they did not register under the ministry's new law.

After People's Representative Council approved a revision of Indonesia's criminal code on 6 December 2022, academician of Mulawarman University, Hardiansyah Hamzah stated that Indonesia is currently autocratizing and blamed the government for being "blind and deaf with public criticism".

After Prabowo Subianto assumed power, there were widespread reports of eroding democratic institution in the country. After his removal from Minister of Higher Education, Science, and Technology position, Satryo Soemantri Brodjonegoro made a revelation to the media that the president was allegedly "allergic" to mass protests. The palace officials would later deny and condemn Brodjonegoro statement as inaccurate. In March 2025, Draft Law on the Indonesian National Army (RUU TNI) was passed by the People's Representative Council which will give active military personnel access to hold position in the judiciary system, state-owned enterprises, and civil services and feared to reduce civilian participations.

The eroding democratic institution is one factor that prompted the 2025 Indonesian protests. The protest saw numerous repressions against activists, artistic workers, and journalists ranging from censorship and usage of weapons against protesters. 32 people were reportedly injured (including non-protesting civilian) with total 30 people arrested and one missing. Pop-punk duo Sukatani was targeted by government censorship after performing a song critical of police corruption and brutality. The protest also saw numerous verbal and physical intimidation against rights groups and critical journalists. The media also highlighted Prabowo Subianto's usage of provocative tones in response to the protest.

In 2024, Thomas Lembong and Hasto Kristiyanto were named suspect to a separate corruption cases. Many speculated that their trials were politically charged and accused the corruption cases were made to silence opposition figures. Tom was sentenced to 4.5 years in prison for sugar import case while Hasto was sentenced for 7 years according to the attorney general for corruption case cover-up.

== Israel ==
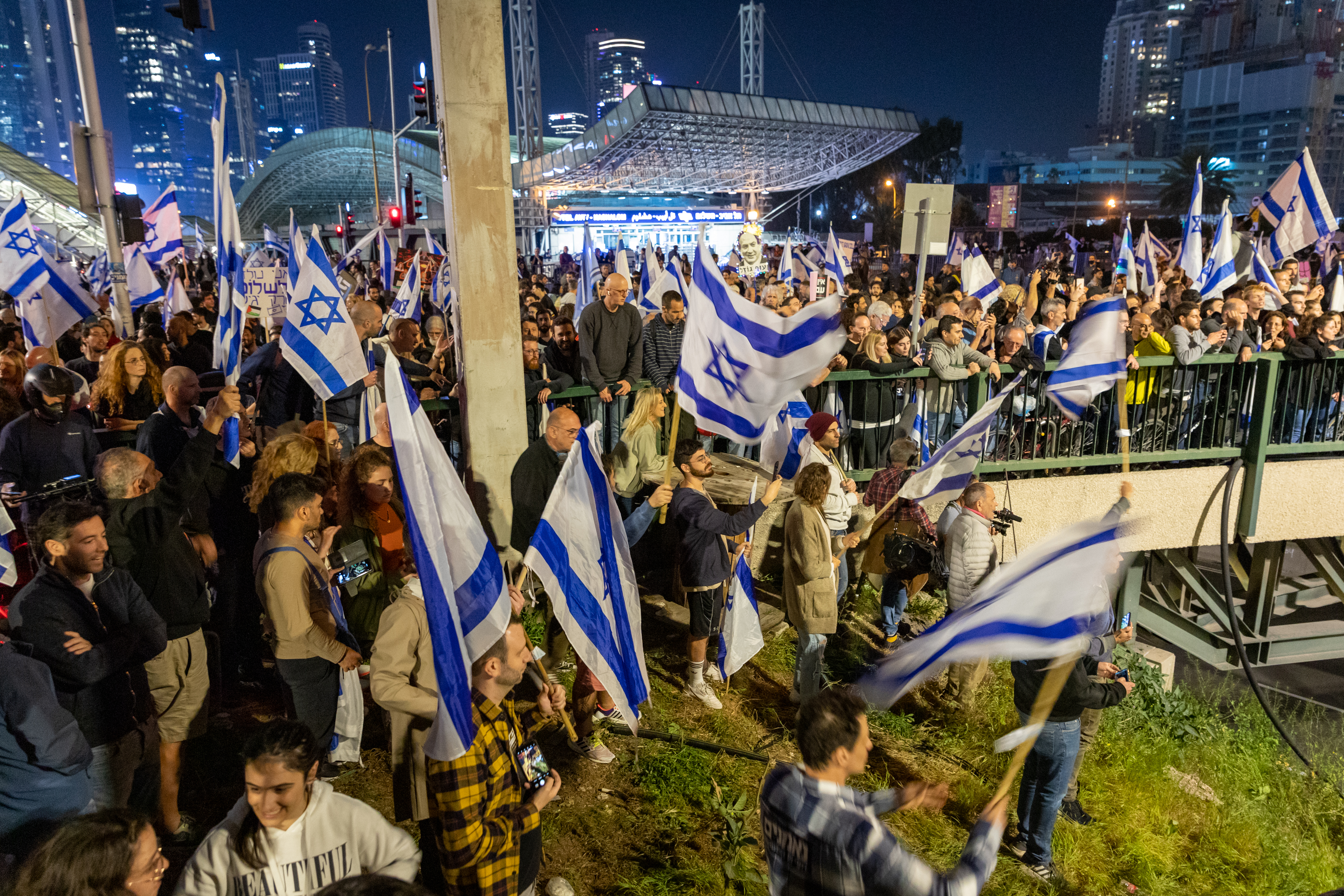
Demonstration against Benjamin Netanyahu's plans to suppress the Supreme Court in March 2023

A number of scholars and commentators have identified Israel in the late 2010s under the premiership of Prime Minister Benjamin Netanyahu as facing a crisis of liberal democracy and a risk of right-wing populism-fueled democratic decline, undermining its traditional status as a democratic state.

Israeli legal scholar Aeyal Gross wrote that while Netanyahu's early premiership embraced a U.S.-style neoconservative approach, his later tenure "increasingly resembled the model of right wing populism with authoritarian tendencies" in the mode of Trump, Orbán, and Bolsonaro. Yaniv Roznai of the Radzyner Law School at Interdisciplinary Center Herzliya wrote in 2018 that while Israel remained "a vibrant democracy with strong and effective judicial and democratic institutions", its liberal democracy was at risk from "incremental erosion of Israel's democratic institutions through countless initiatives to prevent antigovernment criticism, to weaken the judiciary, to infringe minority rights, and to modify the democratic rules of the game." Various scholars and commentators have cited as examples of democratic risks in Israel the "rise of ethno-nationalist populism"' the passage of the Nation-State Law; the use of nativist and exclusionary rhetoric by Netanyahu and his cabinet ministers; including comments during the 2015 election campaign delegitimizing Arab Israeli voters and comments labeling opponents and left-wing critics as traitors and tools of outside forces; proposals to change Israeli law to modify the status of (or unilaterally annex) the West Bank; Netanyahu's effort to grant himself immunity from prosecution on charges of corruption; legislative proposals to limit the powers and independence of the Israeli Supreme Court, including the scope of its judicial review competence; overtly racist or fear-mongering campaign advertisements by some parties of the populist right; and efforts to exert greater control over the media and NGOs. In a 2019 report, Tamara Cofman Wittes and Yael Mizrahi-Arnaud of the Brookings Institution argue that Israeli politics has "sources of resilience" that offer "pathways away from illiberal populism" including structural features of the Israeli political system (such as norms of liberal democracy and a fragmented parliamentary system that leads to competing populist parties) and cultural features of the Israeli society (such as a burgeoning women's movement that spans "secular-religious, Ashkenazi-Mizrachi, and Jewish-Arab divides").

In 2019 and 2020, four national elections were held. The first three resulted in a tie, essentially deadlocking between pro- and anti-Netanyahu forces. The March 2021 election resulted in Netanyahu's ouster and the formation of a broad-based coalition government consisting of right-wing anti-Netanyahu parties, centrist, center-left, left-wing, and Arab parties. Scholars discussed whether the change in power would mark the end of democratic backsliding that had occurred under Netanyahu.

After the collapse of the Bennet-Lapid government, Netanyahu was inaugurated again as Prime Minister and formed a new government which is considered to be the most far-right, ultra-nationalist, religiously conservative government in Israel's history. Netanyahu's government unveiled plans to weaken the judicial system, including overriding Supreme Court decisions with a simple 61-vote majority of the Knesset and changing the structure of the Judicial Selection Committee by adding more politicians. The ultranationalist Itamar Ben-Gvir, who was also previously convicted of supporting a terrorist group known as Kach, which espoused Kahanism and anti-Arabism, was appointed Minister of National Security after changing the law, giving Ben-Gvir unprecedented power over the police.

== Japan ==
Some scholars consider Japan to have experienced mild democratic backsliding under the rule of Shinzo Abe, but on the other hand, many institutions such as the Brookings Institution and Chatham House consider Japan has been one of the most successful and stable democracies in an area of populist turbulence. In 2024, Japan was upgraded from "narrowed" to "open" in the CIVICUS monitor report due to its efforts to protect freedom of assembly and association, notwithstanding the State Secrecy Law.

According to the Leiden Asia Centre, in the lead-up to the 2020 Summer Olympics, Japan had been backsliding under Shinzo Abe due to increasing government surveillance capabilities in the name of making Japan "the safest in the world". It started in 2013 through the creation of the Japan National Security Council and Counter Terrorism Unit Japan and the enactment of the State Secrecy Law in 2014 and Anti-Conspiracy Bill in 2017. These laws were passed without accountability and oversight and only surveilled the Japanese population with a lack of transparency. Despite the postponement of the games due to the COVID-19 pandemic, the government's policies did not change. The Security Coordination Centre (SCC), which was established in May 2020 as a watchdog for government surveillance, shut down due to the postponement of the Olympics, diminishing the oversight. Despite the increasing government surveillance, its efforts failed to prevent the assassination of Shinzo Abe and the attempted assassination of Fumio Kishida.

Japan's democratic backsliding allegations also coincided with its strengthening of security measures in order to better support the US and its blatant disregard of human rights and democracy issues in Myanmar, specifically the Rohingya genocide and the 2021 coup d'état and the neglect of the needs and interests of ethnic minorities. The Suga and Kishida administrations have largely continued the lines of Abe, continuing to support his policies.

Abe's constant interference and intimidation of media outlets, incomplete coverage of the Fukushima nuclear accident, and the State Secrets Law increased self-censorship, and they were cited as the major reasons why Japan fell to 72nd place on the Press Freedom Index in 2016, in contrast to its previous 11th-place ranking from six years prior. In addition to that, his conservative friend Katsuto Momii became the Director-General of NHK on 20 December 2013, compromising the NHK's independence by publicly stating that NHK should not deviate from the government's position, members of Abe's Liberal Democratic Party urged the government to punish media outlets critical of it, and the removal of three television presenters Ichiro Furutachi, Hiroko Kuniya, and Shigetada Kishii from their positions for being critical of his administration. As of 2024, Japan is ranked 70th in the Press Freedom Index and remained the lowest in the G7.

However, whether or not had press freedom declined in Japan remains heavily contested, especially among Japanese. While Constitutional Democratic Party of Japan member Ichirō Ozawa went as far to concern that Japan has experienced "incredible democratic backsliding" due to the erosion of press freedoms, several X users voiced their suspicions about the decline, with some users noting that Japan's press freedom rating rising during the Democratic Party of Japan's rule was arbitrary. In fact, Furutachi remarked on an episode of Yomiuri TV program Sokomadeitteiinkai NP that "after the Democratic Party came into power, we would get calls from ministers and politicians...They would ring up telling us to silence certain newscasters or demanding apologies...since the second Abe administration, the calls have completely stopped". Another user suspected that the sudden decline in Japan's press freedom ranking in 2013 was due to the recognition of kisha clubs in November 2012. Toshio Katsukawa, an associate professor at Tokyo University of Marine Science and Technology, opined that the issue of press freedom was more of an issue of press accountability, noting that "while exercising the freedom not to report inconvenient truths, the media resorts to fabrication and bias in condemning its targets".

There is also disagreement on the prevalence of populism in Japan and its contribution to democratic backsliding. Journalist Takeshi Niinami noted that populism persists in Japanese society in the form of unsustainable government spending that caused mounting government debt and the Lost Decades from the 1990s. Another view expressed by Bećirbegović Selim of the University of Sarajevo considers the dominant Liberal Democratic Party to be populist, while also noting that more populist parties appeared after the 2008 financial crisis and that the LDP under Shinzo Abe used populistic policies in their campaigns such as Abenomics in an October 2020 thesis. Other scholars disagree and noted that particularly since the 2020s, Japan has remained politically stable compared to many European countries and the US, where populist political parties gained popularity. The lack of populism has been attributed to several factors including the party system which requires politicians to compromise on their views, its social safety nets being well-maintained, the prioritization of egalitarianism and cooperation, the lack of an urban-rural cultural divide, and less stigma towards immigration due to an aging population. Still, populism still persists somewhat at the local level, but it is significantly different from populism in G7 nations because it does not contribute to much political polarization.

== Kuwait ==
On 10 May 2024, Emir Mishal Al-Ahmad Al-Jaber Al-Sabah suspended Kuwait's National Assembly, which was considered to be freely democratically elected by men and women. Although it could not appoint the Prime Minister or government leaders, it could pass legislation, investigate and remove cabinet ministers, reject the budget, and approve treaties.

Meshal suspended some of the constitution's provisions, stated that the National Assembly can be dissolved for at least 4 years, and claimed that the legislature was dissolved to improve Kuwait's economic and security situation, although there were other problems outside of the gridlock between the Emir and the legislature. This decision was in line with Kuwaitis becoming more dissatisfied with democracy due to political gridlock.

== Philippines ==
Under the rule of President Rodrigo Duterte, the Philippines has been described as undergoing democratic backsliding.

David Timberman of the Carnegie Endowment for International Peace has argued that the Duterte government has "run roughshod over human rights, its political opponents, and the country's democratic institutions", citing intimidation of political opponents, institutions and the media, increased extrajudicial killings, and suggestions of implementing martial law. Duterte has claimed to have looked to Vladimir Putin and Donald Trump as a role model to do more democratic backsliding.

During his term, Duterte threatened the shutdown of Philippine's largest TV network ABS-CBN. On 5 May 2020 the network met its fate when the National Telecommunications Commission issued a cease and desist order against to the network due to its expired franchise. Duterte also told the media that he would not sign the network's franchise even if the Congress of the Philippines agrees to renew the franchise of the TV network.

== Singapore ==
According to a 2020 study, it claimed that Singapore experienced some democratic backsliding after the 2015 general election.

== South Korea ==
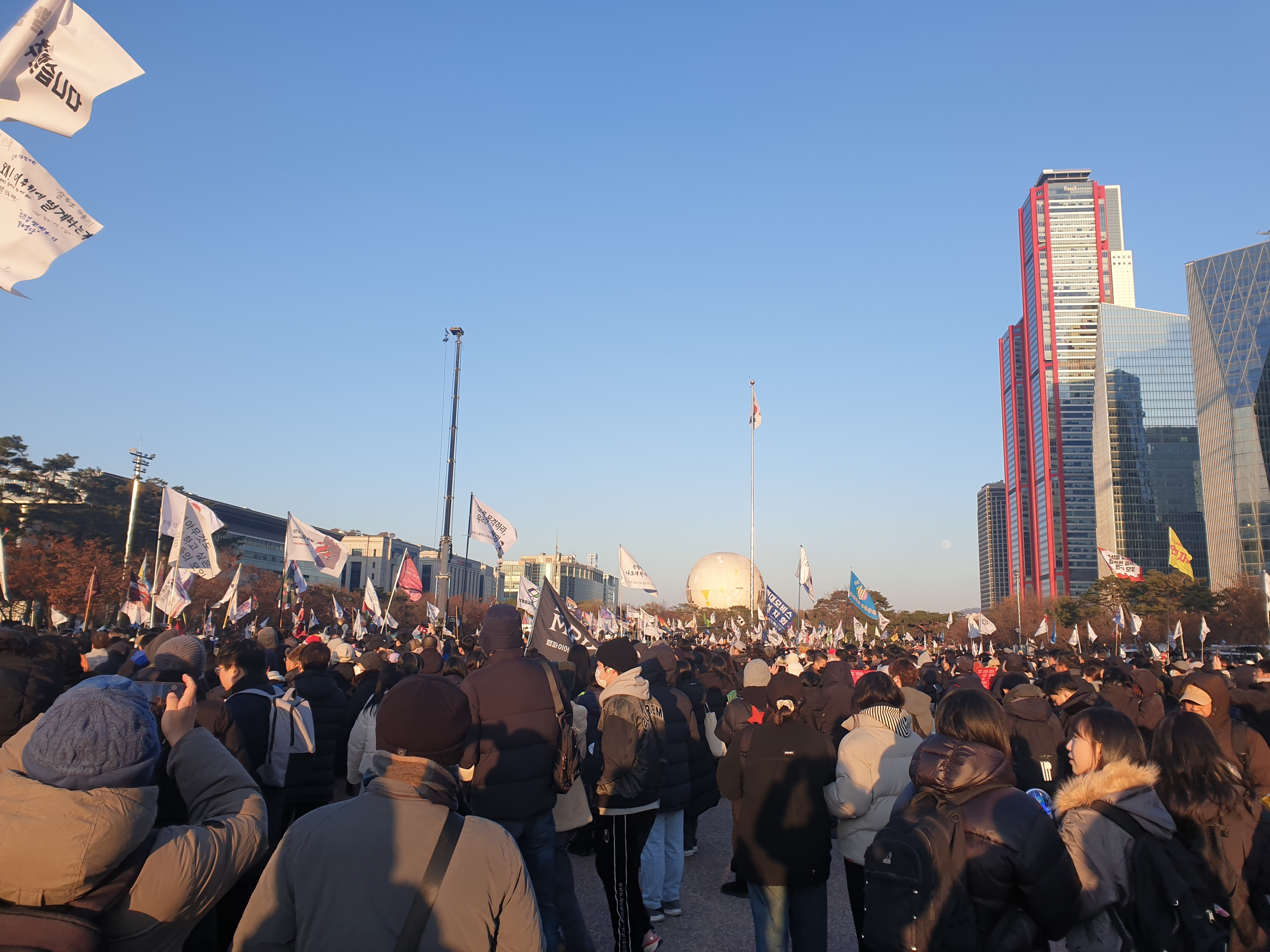
Protests in the aftermath of the 2024 martial law crisis, the first time military rule was attempted since 1980

Democratic backsliding allegations first rose the Lee Myung-bak and Park Geun-hye administrations from 2009 to 2015 due to decreasing executive constraints and illegal government surveillance of the opposition and journalists. After their administrations, in 2018, Lee was arrested for bribery and embezzlement, while Park was impeached and then sentenced to 24 years in prison (later increased to 25 years) for corruption and abuse of power.

During Moon Jae-in presidency after Park's impeachment, South Korea improved its ratings on democracy indices such as the V-Dem Democracy Indices, Freedom in the World, Democracy Index, and World Press Freedom Index. However, Moon's presidency also had politically selective cases against foreign high-ranking officials Prosecutor General Yoon Suk-yeol and weakening judicial independence from the executive by allowing former prosecutors and judges to earn a position in the Blue House and for retired judges to run for and win seats in the National Assembly. The Democratic Party of Korea also tried to curb opposition power by enacting a new electoral system based on mixed-member proportional representation to increase the share of minority parties, which was responded with confrontations in April 2019 that ended in several legislators from both sides receiving charges.

In another case, the Democratic Party threatened to sue a professor for asking readers of a newspaper column she wrote to vote for any party except for the Democratic Party in the 2020 South Korean legislative election. Despite the Moon administration effectively containing COVID-19 in the early stages of the pandemic, the success was at the costs of widespread violations against the right to privacy by surveilling infected people and collecting and publishing their personal information.

Under the Yoon Suk-yeol administration from May 2022, with politically motivated investigations against opposition figures (albeit targeting Moon-era personnel), intimidation against journalists for reporting on to him and his wife, heightening marginalization of communities that lack adequate legal protection such as the LGBTQ+ community, the suppression of strikers, and a lack of accountability from senior government officials. Despite declining use of laws against government critics, charges against individuals and organizations for breaching the National Security Act spiked in 2023, as part of a trend in conservative-leading presidencies.

As of 2024, Sweden's V-Dem is claiming that South Korea autocratized based on their Liberal Democracy Index. As this was reported in South Korea, this word was introduced to South Korea.

South Korea's ranking in World Press Freedom Index published by Reporters Without Borders (RSF) fell sharply in May 2024 compared to 2023. It fell from 47th place to 62nd place, which was influenced by the excessive use of legal sanctions against media outlets that were critical of the government, such as MBC, and severe punishment for critical reporting.

In December 2024, Yoon declared martial law in South Korea, the first time since the military dictatorship of Chun Doo-hwan in 1980, though it was nullified by the National Assembly hours after the declaration. Yoon was subsequently impeached and removed from office.

== Turkey ==
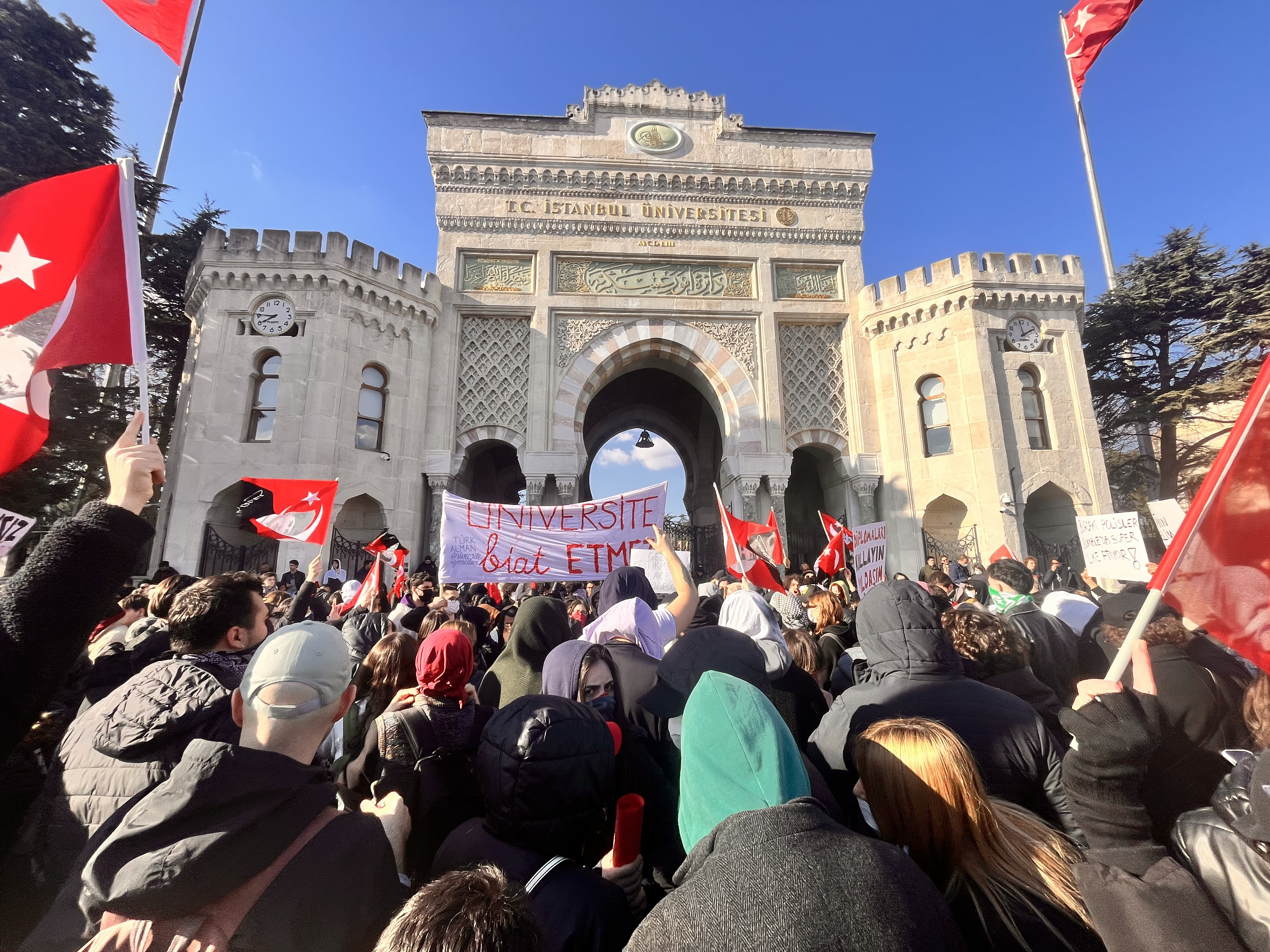
2025 Turkish protests

Turkey under Recep Tayyip Erdoğan has experienced democratic backsliding. Scholar Ozan Varol writes that Erdoğan engaged in a form of "stealth authoritarianism" that incrementally increased pressure on democratic institutions over time and eventually culminated in authoritarianism. Although Erdoğan was originally seen as a reformer, the Turkish government took an authoritarian turn when it violently suppressed the Gezi Park protests in May 2013. Increasing curbs on freedom of the press, freedom of expression, and freedom of assembly coincided with Erdoğan's purge of liberal and conciliatory figures from the Justice and Development Party (AKP).

A constitutional referendum in October 2007 changed the method of selection of the President of Turkey from election by the Grand National Assembly to direct election, which made Turkey a de facto presidential republic, although it took until 2017 to legally formalize this change.. Erdoğan consolidated his executive power through his election in 2014 as the first directly elected President of Turkey and resignation of then Prime Minister Ahmet Davutoğlu in May 2016, who was a member of AKP, following multiple fierce disagreements with Erdoğan which was enabled by both Erdoğan’s influence over the ruling party Justice and Development Party (although he was legally nonpartisan) and his superior public legitimacy over Davutoğlu since he was directly elected and Davutoğlu was not.

Attempts from the government to find a democratic and peaceful solution to 2013–2015 PKK–Turkey peace process has also failed. Following a failed coup attempt in 2016 (which Erdoğan blamed on the Hizmet movement of his former ally-turned-rival, Fethullah Gülen), Erdoğan declared a state of emergency; undertook a series of major purges targeting civil society and perceived political opponents, including those within the bureaucracy, police, judiciary, and academia, and prosecutors; and dismantled the rule of law. A 2017 constitutional referendum formally adopted a presidential system and further aggrandized executive power. The effect of the shifts, partly enabled by a weak and internally divided Turkish opposition, was to transform Turkey into a hybrid regime. In its 2018 annual report, Freedom House classified Turkey as "not free" for the first time since it began publishing annual reports in 1999, having lost a total of 34 points since Erdogan's presidency, including a record 21 points in a span of two years, with a record loss of 15 in 2017 alone. A 2019 report from the European Commission identified Turkey as "seriously backsliding" on areas of human rights, the rule of law and economic policy.

In May 2026, Ankara appeals court issued an interim measure removing the leadership of Turkey's main opposition party, the Republican People’s Party (CHP), including its chair Özgür Özel, and reinstating former leader Kemal Kılıçdaroğlu. HRW described the ruling as "the latest deeply damaging blow to the rule of law, democracy, and human rights" in Turkey. Benjamin Ward, the group's deputy Europe and Central Asia director, stated that the act was part of the Erdoğan administration's "broader political efforts to sideline the main political opposition in ways that profoundly undermine civil and political rights and Turkey’s democratic process."

== See also ==
- Democracy in Asia
- Democracy in the Middle East and North Africa
