= Kenji Manabe =

Japanese politician (1935–2024)

- 真鍋 賢二
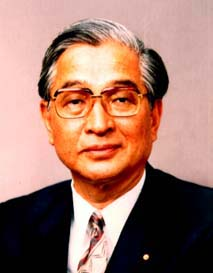
- Official portrait, 1998

Director-General of the Environmental Agency
- In office 30 July 1998 – 5 October 1999
- Prime Minister: Keizō Obuchi
- Preceded by: Hiroshi Oki
- Succeeded by: Kayoko Shimizu

Member of the House of Councillors
- In office 23 July 1995 – 28 July 2007
- Preceded by: Jun Kioka
- Succeeded by: Emiko Uematsu
- Constituency: Kagawa at-large
- In office 10 July 1977 – 9 July 1989
- Preceded by: Tan Maekawa
- Succeeded by: Jun Kioka
- Constituency: Kagawa at-large

Personal details
- Born: 14 July 1935 Mitoyo, Kagawa, Japan
- Died: 2 March 2024 (aged 88) Tokyo, Japan
- Party: Liberal Democratic
- Children: 2
- Education: Gifu University
- Occupation: Pathologist

Kenji Manabe (Japanese: 真鍋賢二 Manabe Kenji; 14 July 1935 – 2 March 2024) was a Japanese pathologist and politician. A member of the Liberal Democratic Party, he served in the House of Councillors from 1977 to 1989 and again from 1995 to 2007. He was also Director-General of the Environmental Agency from 1998 to 1999.

Manabe died in Tokyo on 2 March 2024, at the age of 88.
