= Yasuhide Nakayama =

Japanese politician

- 中山 泰秀
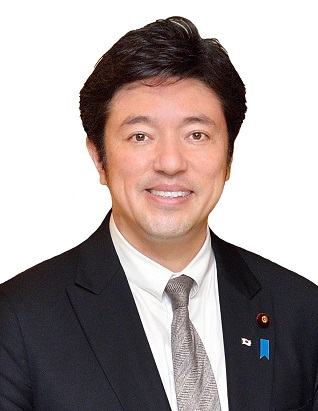
- Official portrait, 2020

Member of the House of Representatives
- Incumbent
- Assumed office 9 February 2026
- Preceded by: Multi-member district
- Constituency: Kinki PR
- In office 21 December 2012 – 14 October 2021
- Preceded by: Multi-member district
- Succeeded by: Teruo Minobe
- Constituency: Kinki PR (2012–2014); Osaka 4th (2014–2021)
- In office 9 November 2003 – 21 July 2009
- Preceded by: Multi-member district
- Succeeded by: Osamu Yoshida
- Constituency: Kinki PR (2003–2005); Osaka 4th (2005–2009)

Personal details
- Born: 14 October 1970 (age 55) Kita, Osaka, Japan
- Party: Liberal Democratic
- Relatives: Masa Nakayama (grandmother); Taro Nakayama (uncle)
- Education: Seijo University; Waseda University

Yasuhide Nakayama (中山 泰秀, Nakayama Yasuhide; born 14 October 1970) is a Japanese politician who served as the Senior Vice Minister of Defense of Japan. A member of the Liberal Democratic Party (LDP), he was elected in December 2012 as a member of the House of Representatives of Japan and re-elected in the December 2015 and 2017 elections. After the snap elections in October 2017, Nakayama was appointed the Chairman of the Foreign Affairs Committee.

== Early life and education ==
Born in Osaka, Japan, Yasuhide Nakayama worked for advertising agency Dentsu on high-profile issues after obtaining a law degree from Seijo University. During high school, he studied abroad for three years in France. He obtained a master's degree from Waseda University in March 2010.

He is a member of the Nakayama political dynasty of Japan, which includes the following members:

- his grandfather Fukuzō Nakayama (1887-1978), a lawyer and politician, former member of the House of Representatives, and of the House of Councilors
- his grandmother Masa Nakayama (1891-1976), the first woman appointed to the Cabinet of Japan when she became Minister of Health and Welfare in 1960
- his uncle Taro Nakayama, member of the House of Councilors and of the House of Representatives, served as Minister of Foreign affairs
- his father Masaaki Nakayama, member of the House of Representatives

== Political career ==
In past governments, Nakayama was a Japanese Vice Minister for Foreign Affairs and served as a member of the House of Representatives of Japan for six years representing the Liberal Democratic Party (LDP). Nakayama has been involved in the Japanese government since 1995 when he became the Secretary to the Commissioner of the Management and Coordination Agency. He has served as secretary to the Minister of Construction, secretary to the State Minister of the Management and Co-ordination Bureau, and as policy secretary for the former Minister of Defense and former Minister of the Environment, Yuriko Koike. Both Koike and Nakayama are affiliated to the openly revisionist lobby Nippon Kaigi, that advocates a return to militarism in Japan.

Nakayama has also been Chairman of the Defense Committee of the LDP, was chairman of the Japan-Israel Parliamentary Friendship League, chairman of the Committee on Organizations Involved with Public Safety, Director of the Special Committee on North Korean Abductions and Other Issues, and Secretary-General for the Parliamentary League for the Promotion of International Market Competitiveness, among many other high-profile posts in parliament and within the LDP.

Nakayama is a supporter of Taiwan. Nakayama has stated that it was important to 'wake up' to China's growing threat and protect Taiwan 'as a democratic country.'

== Business career ==
Nakayama, who after university worked for advertising agency Dentsu on high-profile issues, is currently working as Assistant to President for Pasona Group Inc., a manpower company headquartered in his hometown Osaka, and until his re-election, he served as Senior Adviser to GR Japan, a government relations consultancy.

== Popular culture ==
Nakayama made a cameo appearance in the season finale of the game show I Survived a Japanese Game Show. In the episode, Nakayama congratulated the final two contestants on behalf of the Japanese people for making it to the end of the competition, and thanked them for furthering the understanding of the Japanese culture.

== Sources ==
- 政治家情報 〜中山 泰秀〜. ザ･選挙 (in Japanese). Janjan.
