= Osaka 4th district =

- Parliamentary constituency for the Japanese House of Representatives
- Numbered map of the Osaka city single seats
- Prefecture: Osaka
- Proportional District: Kinki
- Electorate: 417,674

Current constituency
- Created: 1994
- Seats: One
- Party: Ishin
- Representative: Teruo Minobe
- Municipalities: Fukushima-ku, Jōtō-ku, Kita-ku, and Miyakojima-ku of Osaka.

Osaka 4th district (大阪府第4区, Osaka-fu dai-yonku or simply 大阪4区, Osaka-yonku ) is a single-member constituency of the House of Representatives in the national Diet of Japan located in Osaka Prefecture.

== Areas covered ==
=== Since 2017 ===
- Part of Osaka
  - Fukushima-ku
  - Jōtō-ku
  - Kita-ku
  - Miyakojima-ku

=== 1994 - 2017 ===
- Part of Osaka
  - Fukushima-ku
  - Higashinari-ku
  - Jōtō-ku
  - Kita-ku
  - Miyakojima-ku

== List of representatives ==
Election	Representative	Party	Notes
1996	Tadashi Maeda	New Frontier	
1996	Tadashi Maeda	Reform Club	
2000	Masaaki Nakayama	LDP	
2003	Osamu Yoshida	Democratic	
2005	Yasuhide Nakayama	LDP	
2009	Osamu Yoshida	Democratic	
2012	Masatoshi Murakami	Restoration	
2012	Masatoshi Murakami	Innovation	
2014	Yasuhide Nakayama	LDP	
2017	Yasuhide Nakayama	LDP	
2021	Teruo Minobe	Ishin	
2024	Teruo Minobe	Ishin	
2026	Teruo Minobe	Ishin	

== Election results ==
=== 2026 ===
2026
Party	Candidate	Votes	%	±%
Ishin	Teruo Minobe	87,309	37.2	▼5.95
LDP	Yasuhide Nakayama (elected in Kinki PR block)	71,040	30.3	▲0.7
DPP	Tadashi Okamoto	28,240	12.0	
Sanseitō	Miki Fujita	24,019	10.2	▲1.1
JCP	Minori Yamada	19,832	8.4	▼6.9
Mushozoku Rengō	Kazuya Hashiguchi	4,299	1.8	
Registered electors		416,717		
Turnout			58.87	▲4.50
Ishin hold				

=== 2024 ===
2024
Party	Candidate	Votes	%	±%
Ishin	Teruo Minobe	94,129	43.14	
LDP	Yasuhide Nakayama	64,424	29.53	
JCP	Tadashi Shimizu	33,585	15.39	
Sanseitō	Yōji Kurokawa	20,038	9.18	New
Independent	Sanae Terakawa	6,008	2.75	New
Majority		29,705	13.61	
Registered electors		414,741		
Turnout			54.37	▼3.96
Ishin hold				

=== 2021 ===
2021
Party	Candidate	Votes	%	±%
Ishin	Teruo Minobe	107,585	46.15	
LDP	Yasuhide Nakayama	72,835	31.24	
CDP	Osamu Yoshida	28,254	12.12	New
JCP	Tadashi Shimizu	24,469	10.50	
Majority		34,750	14.91	
Registered electors		408,256		
Turnout			58.33	▲8.59
Ishin gain from LDP				

=== 2017 ===
2017
Party	Candidate	Votes	%	±%
LDP	Yasuhide Nakayama	80,083	42.29	
Ishin	Teruo Minobe	72,446	38.26	New
JCP	Tadashi Shimizu	36,825	19.45	
Majority		7,637	4.03	
Registered electors		390,850		
Turnout			49.74	▼0.50
LDP hold				

=== 2014 ===
2014
Party	Candidate	Votes	%	±%
LDP	Yasuhide Nakayama	82,538	38.87	
Innovation	Hirofumi Yoshimura (Won PR seat)	74,101	34.90	New
JCP	Tadashi Shimizu (Won PR seat)	31,478	14.83	
Independent	Osamu Yoshida	24,213	11.40	New
Majority		8,437	3.97	
Registered electors		434,977		
Turnout			50.24	
LDP gain from Innovation				

=== 2012 ===
2012
Party	Candidate	Votes	%	±%
Restoration	Masatoshi Murakami	95,452	38.64	New
LDP	Yasuhide Nakayama (Won PR seat)	89,894	36.39	
Democratic	Osamu Yoshida	30,563	12.37	
JCP	Tadashi Shimizu	25,694	10.40	
Social Democratic	Yukihiro Inoue	5,438	2.20	New
Majority		5,558	2.25	
Registered electors				
Turnout				
Restoration gain from Democratic				

=== 2009 ===
2009
Party	Candidate	Votes	%	±%
Democratic	Osamu Yoshida	135,411	50.81	
LDP	Yasuhide Nakayama	98,576	36.98	
JCP	Yoshio Hasegawa	28,432	10.67	
Happiness Realization	Yoshikazu Haruyama	4,111	1.54	New
Majority		36,835	13.83	
Registered electors				
Turnout				
Democratic gain from LDP				

=== 2005 ===
2005
Party	Candidate	Votes	%	±%
LDP	Yasuhide Nakayama	132,072	52.25	
Democratic	Osamu Yoshida	91,756	36.30	
JCP	Yoshio Hasegawa	28,931	11.45	
Majority		40,316	15.95	
Registered electors				
Turnout				
LDP gain from Democratic				

=== 2003 ===
2003
Party	Candidate	Votes	%	±%
Democratic	Osamu Yoshida	92,470	44.79	
LDP	Yasuhide Nakayama (Won PR seat)	87,187	42.24	
JCP	Yoshio Hasegawa	26,776	12.97	
Majority		5,283	2.55	
Registered electors				
Turnout				
Democratic gain from LDP				

=== 2000 ===
2000
Party	Candidate	Votes	%	±%
LDP	Masaaki Nakayama	63,290	30.71	
Democratic	Osamu Yoshida	54,038	26.22	New
JCP	Yoshio Hasegawa	36,804	17.86	
Reform Club	Tadashi Maeda	34,476	16.73	New
Liberal	Fumiyoshi Murakami	17,450	8.47	New
Majority		9,252	4.49	
Registered electors				
Turnout				
LDP gain from Reform Club (Japan, 1998)				

=== 1996 ===
1996
Party	Candidate	Votes	%	±%
New Frontier	Tadashi Maeda	76,297	38.97	New
LDP	Masaaki Nakayama (Won PR seat)	66,127	33.78	New
JCP	Tomoko Yamanaka	47,904	24.47	New
Independent	Seiichi Kato	5,439	2.78	New
Majority		10,170	5.19	
Registered electors				
Turnout				
New Frontier win (new seat)				
