= Masa Nakayama =

Japanese politician

- 中山 マサ
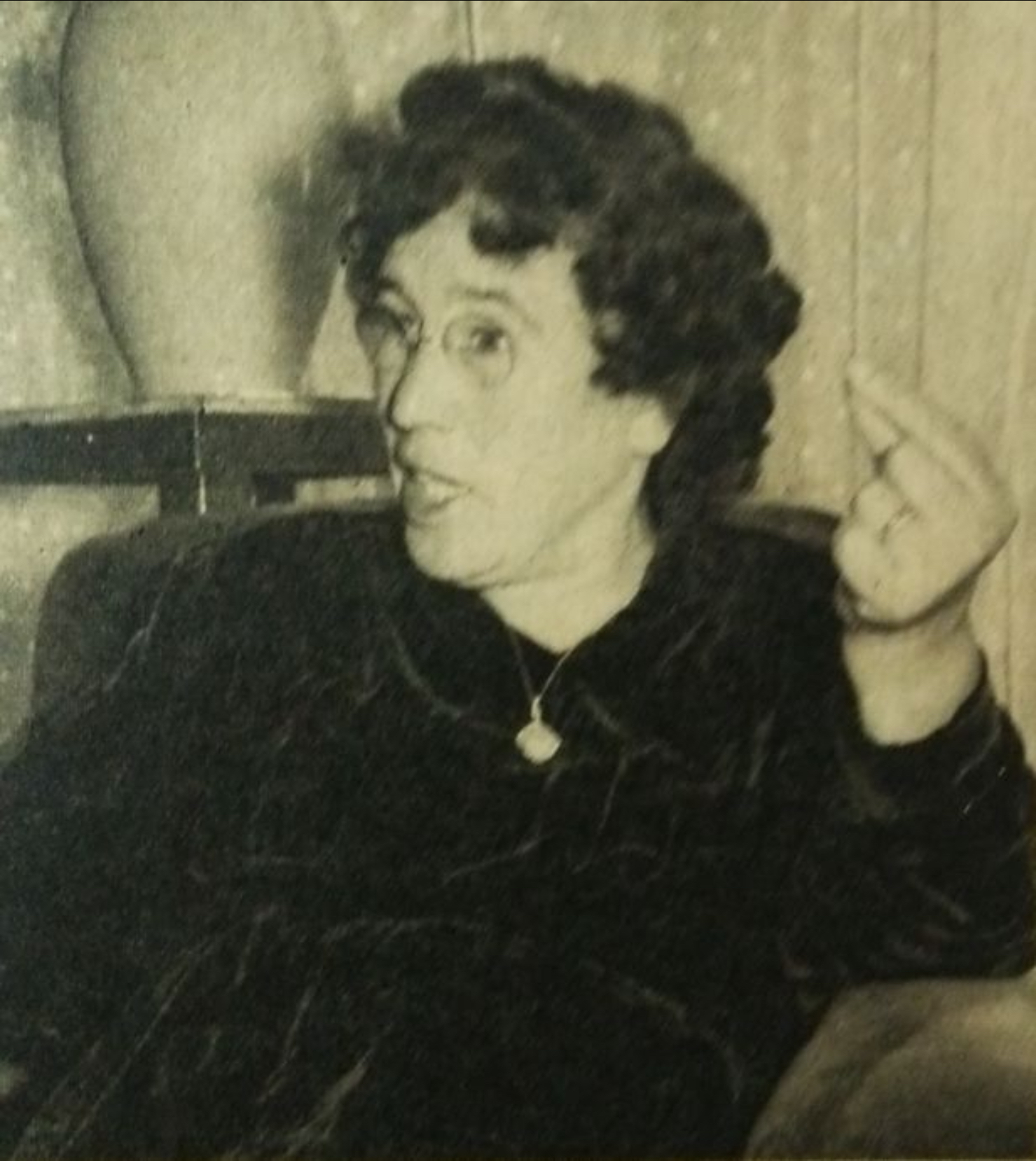
- Nakayama in 1952

Minister of Health and Welfare
- In office 19 July 1960 – 8 December 1960
- Prime Minister: Hayato Ikeda
- Preceded by: Yoshio Watanabe
- Succeeded by: Kimi Furui

Member of the House of Representatives
- In office 30 January 1967 – 2 December 1969
- Preceded by: Tomizō Oshitani
- Succeeded by: Masaaki Nakayama
- Constituency: Osaka 2nd
- In office 26 April 1947 – 23 October 1963
- Preceded by: Constituency established
- Succeeded by: Tomizō Oshitani
- Constituency: Osaka 2nd

Personal details
- Born: Masa Iida-Powers; 19 January 1891 Nagasaki, Japan
- Died: 11 October 1976 (aged 85) Osaka, Japan
- Party: Liberal Democratic
- Other political affiliations: DP (1947); Dōshi Club (1947–1948); DLP (1948–1950); LP (1950–1955)
- Spouse: Fukuzō Nakayama
- Children: Taro Nakayama; Masaaki Nakayama
- Relatives: Yasuhide Nakayama (grandson)
- Education: Kwassui Women's University; Ohio Wesleyan University

Masa Nakayama (中山 マサ, Nakayama Masa; January 19, 1891 – October 11, 1976) was a Japanese politician and educator who was the first woman appointed to the Cabinet of Japan when she became Minister of Health and Welfare in 1960.

== Early life and education ==
Nakayama was born Masa Iida-Powers in Nagasaki, the daughter of Rodney H. Powers, an American businessman who had settled in Nagasaki in the 1860s, and his Japanese partner, Naka Iida. Masa attended Kwassui Jogakko, a mission school run by American Methodist missionaries. In 1911, she moved to the United States where she enrolled at Ohio Wesleyan University, graduating in 1916. Returning to Japan, she had a distinguished career as a high school and college educator prior to the outbreak of World War II. In 1923, Nakayama married Fukuzō Nakayama, a lawyer and politician who served in the lower house from 1932 to 1942, and later in the upper house after World War II.

== Political career ==
In 1947, she was elected as a member of the House of Representatives in the Diet, representing the second district of Osaka Prefecture. In 1960, she became the first woman appointed to the Cabinet of Japan when she was appointed Minister of Health and Welfare by Prime Minister Hayato Ikeda. She served as a minister for five months, stepping down in December 1960.

== Later life and death ==
Nakayama retired from the Diet in 1969, and was succeeded in her seat by her son, Masaaki. Nakayama died of throat cancer at an Osaka hospital on October 11, 1976, aged 85.

== Family and descendants ==
Nakayama and her husband had two sons who also went into national politics: Representative Taro Nakayama and Representative Masaaki Nakayama. Representative Yasuhide Nakayama is her grandson and Masaaki's son.

Political offices
Preceded by Yoshio Watanabe	Minister of Health and Welfare; 1960	Succeeded by Kimi Furui
