= Yoshihiko Isozaki =

Japanese politician

- 磯﨑 仁彦
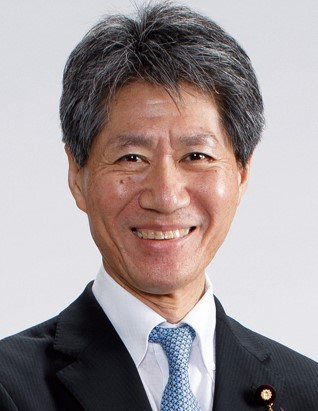
- Official portrait, 2021

Deputy Chief Cabinet Secretary (Political affairs, House of Councillors)
- In office 4 October 2021 – 13 September 2023
- Prime Minister: Fumio Kishida
- Preceded by: Naoki Okada
- Succeeded by: Hiroshi Moriya

Member of the House of Councillors
- Incumbent
- Assumed office 26 July 2010
- Preceded by: Toshio Yamauchi
- Constituency: Kagawa at-large

Personal details
- Born: 8 September 1957 (age 68) Marugame, Kagawa, Japan
- Party: Liberal Democratic
- Education: University of Tokyo

Yoshihiko Isozaki (born September 8, 1957, in Kagawa Prefecture, Japan) is a Japanese politician who has served as a member of the House of Councillors of Japan since 2010. He represents the Kagawa at-large district and is a member of the Liberal Democratic Party.

He is a member of the following committees in the House of Councillors:

- Committee on Judicial Affairs (director)
- Committee on Budget
- Special Committee on North Korean Abduction Issue and Related Matters
- Commission on the Constitution
- Board of Oversight and Review of Specially Designated Secrets
