= Shigeru Ishimoto =

Japanese politician (1913–2007)

- 石本 茂

Director-General of the Environmental Agency
- In office 1 November 1984 – 28 December 1985
- Prime Minister: Yasuhiro Nakasone
- Preceded by: Minoru Ueda
- Succeeded by: Yoshihide Mori

Member of the House of Councillors
- In office 5 July 1965 – 9 July 1989
- Constituency: National district (1965–1983); National PR (1983–1989)

Personal details
- Born: 6 September 1913 Komatsu, Ishikawa, Japan
- Died: 10 October 2007 (aged 94) Kanazawa, Ishikawa, Japan
- Party: Liberal Democratic
- Other political affiliations: Independent (1965–1970)

Shigeru Ishimoto (1913–2007) was a Japanese politician. She served as Director-General of the Environmental Agency from 1984 to 1985. She was the third woman to become a Cabinet minister in Japan.
