= Shingo Miyake =

Japanese politician

- 三宅 伸吾
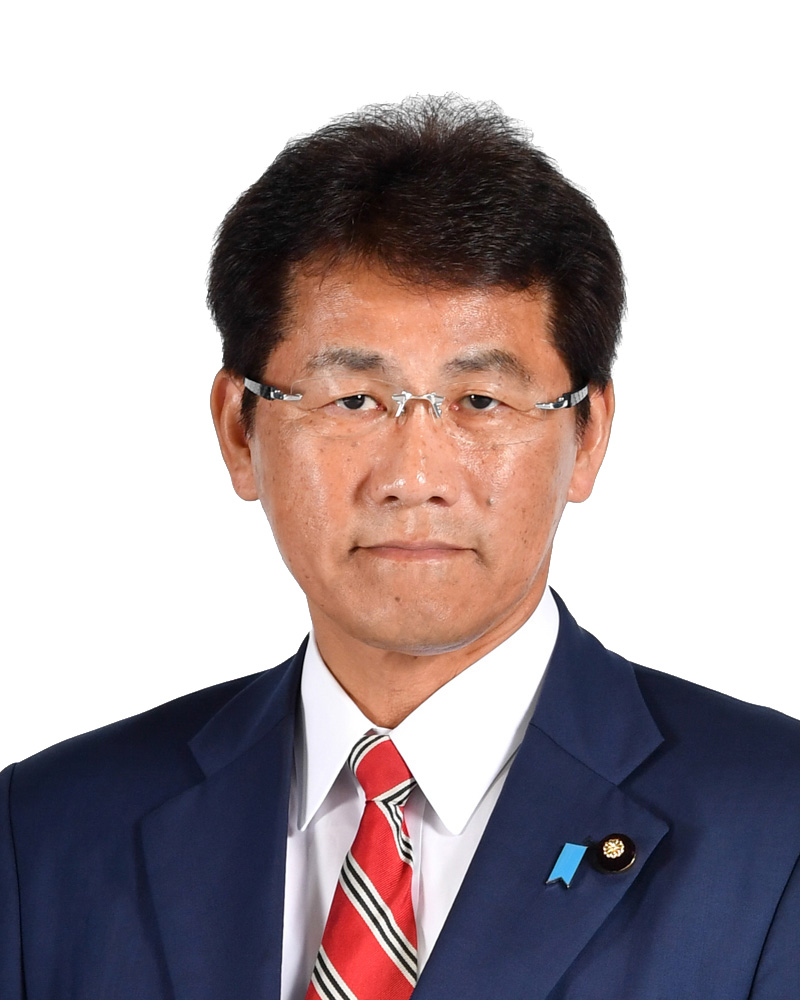
- Official portrait, 2023

Member of the House of Councillors
- In office 29 July 2013 – 28 July 2025
- Preceded by: Emiko Uematsu
- Succeeded by: Hidekazu Harada
- Constituency: Kagawa at-large

Personal details
- Born: 24 November 1961 (age 64) Shido, Kagawa, Japan
- Party: Liberal Democratic
- Education: Waseda University; Columbia University; University of Tokyo

Shingo Miyake (born November 24, 1961) is a Japanese politician who is a former member of the House of Councillors of Japan.

== Career ==
He graduated from Waseda University in 1986 from the School of Political Science and Economics. In 1989, he graduated from Columbia University in New York City, and finally the Graduate school for Law and Politics in 1995.

He worked for Nikkei Inc. as a writer.

Since 2001, he has worked in the field of international labour standards.

He was elected in 2013 and 2019 and serves as a parliamentary vice-Minister for Foreign affairs. In 2017, he was chosen as chairman of the Committee on Foreign Affairs and Defense, and 2021 as Vice-Minister for Foreign Affairs.

On November 28, 2024, he was appointed as Chairman of the Finance and Financial Committee.
