= Kayoko Shimizu =

Japanese female nurse and politician (1935-)

- 清水 嘉与子
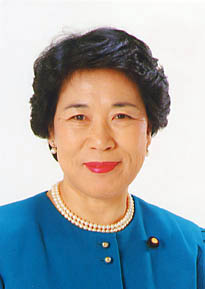
- Official portrait, 1999

Director-General of the Environmental Agency
- In office October 5, 1999 – July 4, 2000
- Prime Minister: Keizō Obuchi; Yoshirō Mori
- Preceded by: Kenji Manabe
- Succeeded by: Yoriko Kawaguchi

Member of the House of Councillors
- In office July 24, 1989 – July 28, 2007
- Constituency: National PR

Personal details
- Born: November 9, 1935 (age 90) Tokyo, Japan
- Party: Liberal Democratic
- Education: Health and Nursing, University of Tokyo
- Occupation: Nurse and Politician
- Website: Official Website

Kayoko Shimizu (清水嘉与子) (born November 9, 1935) is a Japanese politician and nurse. She has served as the Minister of the Environment Agency (37th and 38th terms) and a member of the House of Councillors (3 terms), as well as various other governmental and political party positions.

== Early life and nursing career ==
Shimizu graduated from Kitazono High School in Tokyo and the Department of Health and Nursing, Faculty of Medicine, University of Tokyo. As a nurse, she served as head nurse of the nursing department at Kanto Teishin Hospital, a lecturer at the Faculty of Medicine, University of Tokyo, and head of the Nursing Division of the Medical Affairs Bureau of the Ministry of Health and Welfare. She served as Chair of the Japan Nursing Federation from June 2009 to July 2013.

== Political career ==
In the 15th regular election for the House of Councillors in 1989, she was endorsed by the Liberal Democratic Party and recommended by the Japanese Nursing Association and the Japanese Nursing Federation (as successor to Shigeru Ishimoto), and ran in the proportional representation district of the House of Councillors, winning her first election. She was elected three times in a row. She was a member of the Seiwa-kai faction within the party. After serving as Parliamentary Vice-Minister of Labor and Chairman of the House of Councillors' Education Committee, she first joined the Obuchi Cabinet in 1999 as Minister of the Environment. She was reappointed to the first Mori Cabinet, which was formed the following year. She retired from politics in 2007. In November 2007, she was awarded the Grand Cordon of the Order of the Rising Sun.

Shimizu was part of the scandal of Japanese politicians not paying their pensions that was discovered in 2004.

== Books ==
- "Our Law: Commentary on the Public Health Nurse, Midwife and Nurse Law" Japan Nursing Association Publishing, 1985
- "Our Law: Learning about the Law for Public Health Nurses, Midwives, and Nurses" 2nd Edition, Japan Nursing Association Publishing, 1988
- "A First-Year Diet Member's Nagatacho Diary: 365 Days of Shimizu Kayoko," Shimizu Kayoko Policy Research Group, 1990
- "Nagatacho Diary: Kayoko Shimizu's Activities" Kayoko Shimizu Policy Research Group, 1992
- "Creating a Recycling-Based Society and Medical Waste" Japan Nursing Association Publishing, 2001

== Co-editor ==
- "Nursing Law Handbook" co-edited by Toyoko Kadowaki, Igaku Shoin, 1984
- "Nursing for all: Nursing in Society" (ed.) Japan Nursing Association Publishing, 1988
- Nursing Law Handbook 1997 Edition, co-edited by Toyoko Kadowaki and Hiroko Moriyama, Japan Nursing Association Publishing, 1997
- "Nursing and Care Legislation Handbook" co-edited by Toyoko Kadowaki, Igaku Shoin, 2001

== Political offices ==
House of Councillors
Preceded by	Member of the House of Councillors (proportional); 1989-2007	Succeeded by
Political offices
Preceded by	Special Committee on the North Korean Abduction Issue; 2004	Succeeded by
Preceded by Kenji Manabe	Minister of the Environment and Minister of Global Environmental; 1999–2000	Succeeded by Yoriko Kawaguchi
Preceded by Kiyoko Ono	Chairman of the House of Councillors' Education Committee; 1996–1997	Succeeded by Yoshihisa Oshima
