= Emiko Uematsu =

Japanese politician

- 植松 恵美子

Member of the House of Councillors
- In office 29 July 2007 – 28 July 2013
- Preceded by: Kenji Manabe
- Succeeded by: Shingo Miyake
- Constituency: Kagawa at-large

Personal details
- Born: 13 November 1967 (age 58) Takamatsu, Kagawa, Japan
- Party: Democratic (2003–2013)
- Other political affiliations: Independent (2013–2017); Kibō no Tō (2017–2018)
- Education: Kobe University
- Website: Official website

Emiko Uematsu (植松 恵美子, Uematsu Emiko; born November 13, 1967) is a former Japanese politician in the Democratic Party of Japan (DPJ), who served as a member of the House of Councillors in the Diet (national legislature). A native of Takamatsu, Kagawa and graduate of Kobe University, she ran unsuccessfully for the House of Councillors in 2004. She ran again in 2007 and was elected for the first time. She left the DPJ in 2013 because of a difference of political policy.

House of Councillors
Preceded by Kenji Manabe	Councillor for Kagawa; 2007–2013	Succeeded by Shingo Miyake
