= Tadashi Shimizu =

Japanese politician

- 清水 忠史

Member of the House of Representatives
- In office 17 April 2019 – 14 October 2021
- Preceded by: Takeshi Miyamoto
- Succeeded by: Takeshi Miyamoto
- Constituency: Kinki PR
- In office 19 December 2014 – 28 September 2017
- Constituency: Kinki PR

Member of the Osaka City Council
- In office 2007–2010
- Constituency: Fukushima Ward

Personal details
- Born: 5 May 1968 (age 58) Suita, Osaka, Japan
- Party: Communist
- Education: Osaka University of Economics

Tadashi Shimizu (清水 忠史, Shimizu Tadashi) is a member of the Japanese Communist Party who served in the House of Representatives. He is against the passed anti-conspiracy bill. He is also against paying welfare benefits with pre-paid credit cards, saying that it would only benefit credit card companies.

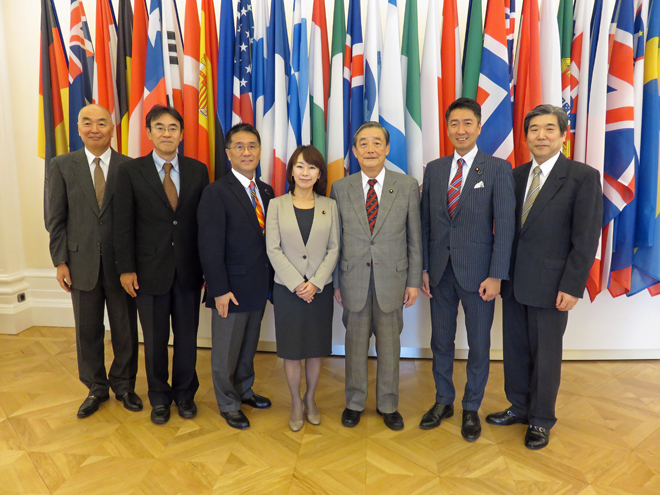
Shimizu Tadashi with the Committee on Judicial Affairs in 2015.
