= Michiko Ishii =

Japanese politician (1933–2012)

- 石井 道子
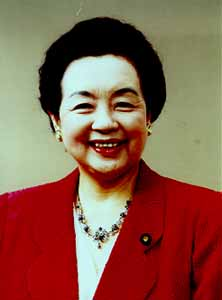
- Official portrait, 1996

Director-General of the Environmental Agency
- In office 7 November 1996 – 11 September 1997
- Prime Minister: Ryutaro Hashimoto
- Preceded by: Sukio Iwatare
- Succeeded by: Hiroshi Ōki

Member of the House of Councillors
- In office 5 September 1984 – 22 July 2001
- Preceded by: Kiyoshi Chikunai
- Succeeded by: Multi-member district
- Constituency: National PR

Personal details
- Born: 5 February 1933 Iruma, Saitama, Japan
- Died: 7 December 2012 (aged 79) Tokyo, Japan
- Party: Liberal Democratic
- Education: Tokyo University of Pharmacy and Life Sciences

Michiko Ishii (5 February 1933 – 7 December 2012) was a Japanese politician.

Ishii was born on 5 February 1933 and attended the Tokyo College of Pharmacy. She was a member of the Liberal Democratic Party. She served as Minister of the Environment in 1996.
