= Tadashi Maeda (politician) =

Japanese politician

- 前田 正
- Official portrait, 1999

Member of the House of Representatives
- In office 20 October 1996 – 2 June 2000
- Preceded by: Constituency established
- Succeeded by: Masaaki Nakayama
- Constituency: Osaka 4th
- In office 18 February 1990 – 18 June 1993
- Preceded by: Masao Nakamura
- Succeeded by: Osamu Yoshida
- Constituency: Osaka 2nd

Personal details
- Born: 7 December 1946 Osaka, Japan
- Died: 28 October 2013 (aged 66) Osaka, Japan
- Party: Reform Club
- Other political affiliations: LDP (before 1994); NFP (1994–1998)
- Spouse: Yukie Maeda
- Parent: Jiichirō Maeda (father)
- Education: Osaka University

Tadashi Maeda (前田 正, Maeda Tadashi; December 7, 1946 – October 28, 2013) was a Japanese politician who served two terms in the House of Representatives.

== Early life and education ==
Maeda was born in Osaka in 1946, he was the son of House of Representatives member Jiichirō Maeda. In 1969 he graduated from the Engineering Department of Osaka University.

== Political career ==
After serving as promotions director of the Osaka branch of the LDP, he was elected to the Diet in the 39th general election on an LDP ticket, and joined the Kōmoto faction. In the 1993 general election he failed to be reelected, but managed to be reelected on a New Frontier Party ticket in the 1996 general election. In 1998, he joined the so-called Reform Club led by Tatsuo Ozawa. In 1999, he became Parliamentary Vice-Minister in the Ministry of Posts and Telecommunications, a post he also had in the Obuchi Cabinet and in the First Mori Cabinet.

== Death ==
He died on October 28, 2013, in Osaka from heart failure.
