= Hiroo Nakashima =

Japanese politician (1937–2024)

- 中島 啓雄
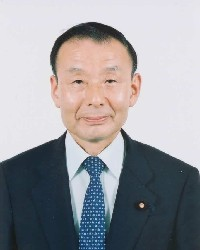

Member of the House of Councillors
- In office 3 October 2001 – 28 July 2007
- Preceded by: Kenji Kōso
- Succeeded by: Multi-member district
- Constituency: National PR
- In office 20 August 1999 – 22 July 2001
- Preceded by: Hiroshi Ishikawa
- Succeeded by: Multi-member district
- Constituency: National PR

Personal details
- Born: 25 December 1937 Dalian, Kwantung Leased Territory, Japan
- Died: 7 February 2024 (aged 86) Ōme, Tokyo, Japan
- Party: Liberal Democratic
- Education: University of Tokyo
- Occupation: Businessman

Hiroo Nakashima (Japanese: 中島啓雄; 25 December 1937 – 7 February 2024) was a Japanese businessman and politician. A member of the Liberal Democratic Party, he served in the House of Councillors from 1995 to 2007.

Nakashima died of lung cancer in Ōme, on 7 February 2024, at the age of 86.
