= Kagawa at-large district =

Japan House of Councillors constituency

- 香川県選挙区
- Parliamentary constituency for the House of Councillors
- Prefecture: Kagawa
- Electorate: 800,572 (as of September 2022)

Current constituency
- Created: 1947
- Seats: 2
- Councillors: Class of 2019: Shingo Miyake (LDP); Class of 2022: Yoshihiko Isozaki (LDP)

Kagawa at-large district (香川県選挙区, Kagawa-ken Senkyo-ku) is a constituency of the House of Councillors in the Diet of Japan (national legislature). It consists of Kagawa Prefecture and elects two Councillors, one every three years by a first-past-the-post system for a six-year term. In the first election in 1947, Kagawa like all districts used single non-transferable vote to elect both its Councillors in one election.

Single-member districts (ichinin-ku) for the House of Councillors often play a decisive role for the outcome of elections as little swing in votes is required to achieve a change of the Councillors elected there. Kagawa in predominantly rural Shikoku has in most elections voted for candidates from the Liberal Democratic Party (LDP); but in 1950, 1965, 1971 and in the landslide election of 1989 – the first that led to a nejire kokkai ("twisted parliament": opposition control of the House of Councillors) – the main opposition Japan Socialist Party (JSP) managed to pick up a seat in Kagawa. Following the decline of the 1955 System of LDP and JSP and the party realignments of the 1990s, the JSP was replaced by the Democratic Party of Japan (DPJ) as main opposition party. DPJ candidate Emiko Uematsu could win Kagawa by a large margin against LDP incumbent Kenji Manabe in the 2007 election that also led to a nejire kokkai. It now, similar to other 2-seat districts, serves as an LDP stronghold. When the opposition consolidated behind Miwako Oda in 2019, they lost by thirteen points to Miyake still.

== Current Councillors ==
As of July 2025, the current councillors representing this district are as follows:

- Shingo Miyake (Class of 2019, 2nd term, expires 2025)
- Yoshihiko Isozaki (Class of 2022, 3rd term, expires 2028)

== Elected Councillors ==
Class of 1947	Election year	Class of 1950
#1 (1947: #1, 6-year term)	Election year	#1 (1947: #2, 3-year term)
Hajime Miyoshi (Co-op)	1947	Tsunetarō Katō (JLP)
Hajime Miyoshi (Co-op)	1950	Takashi Morisaki (JSP)
Kazuo Shirakawa (Indep.)	1953	Takashi Morisaki (JSP)
Kazuo Shirakawa (Indep.)	1956	Tarō Hirai (LDP)
Keikichi Masuhara (LDP)	1957 by-el.	Tarō Hirai (LDP)
Juichi Tsushima (LDP)	1959	Tarō Hirai (LDP)
Juichi Tsushima (LDP)	1962	Tarō Hirai (LDP)
Tan Maekawa (JSP)	1965	Tarō Hirai (LDP)
Tan Maekawa (JSP)	1968	Tarō Hirai (LDP)
Tan Maekawa (JSP)	1971	Tarō Hirai (LDP)
Tan Maekawa (JSP)	1974 by-el.	Takushi Hirai (LDP)
Tan Maekawa (JSP)	1974	Takushi Hirai (LDP)
Kenji Manabe (LDP)	1977	Takushi Hirai (LDP)
Kenji Manabe (LDP)	1980	Takushi Hirai (LDP)
Kenji Manabe (LDP)	1983	Takushi Hirai (LDP)
Kenji Manabe (LDP)	1986	Takushi Hirai (LDP)
Jun Kioka (JSP)	1989	Takushi Hirai (LDP)
Jun Kioka (JSP)	1992	Takushi Hirai (LDP)
Kenji Manabe (LDP)	1995	Takushi Hirai (LDP)
Kenji Manabe (LDP)	1998	Toshio Yamauchi (LDP)
Kenji Manabe (LDP)	2001	Toshio Yamauchi (LDP)
Kenji Manabe (LDP)	2004	Toshio Yamauchi (LDP)
Emiko Uematsu (DPJ)	2007	Toshio Yamauchi (LDP)
Emiko Uematsu (DPJ)	2010	Yoshihiko Isozaki (LDP)
Shingo Miyake (LDP)	2013	Yoshihiko Isozaki (LDP)
Shingo Miyake (LDP)	2016	Yoshihiko Isozaki (LDP)
Shingo Miyake (LDP)	2019	Yoshihiko Isozaki (LDP)
Shingo Miyake (LDP)	2022	Yoshihiko Isozaki (LDP)
Hidekazu Harada (DPP)	2025	Yoshihiko Isozaki (LDP)

== Election results ==
In the 2025 election held on 20 July, Hidekazu Harada of the Democratic Party for the People (DPP) won the Kagawa constituency seat with 174,728 votes (40.35%), defeating LDP incumbent Shingo Miyake, who received 149,902 votes (34.62%). The result represented the LDP's first defeat in the Kagawa constituency since 2007.
