= Taro Nakayama =

Japanese politician (1924–2023)

- 中山 太郎
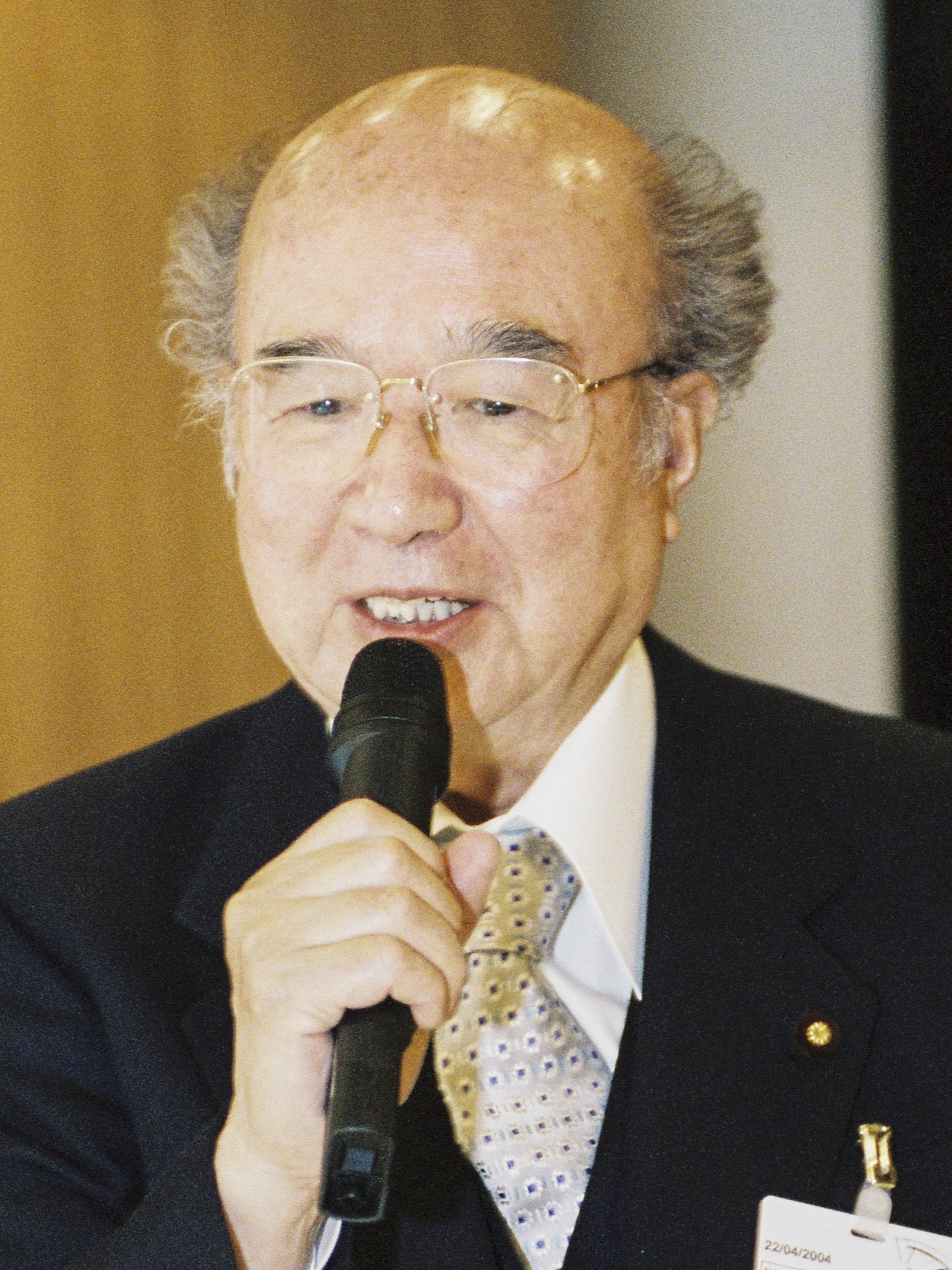
- Nakayama in 2004

Minister for Foreign Affairs
- In office 10 August 1989 – 5 November 1991
- Prime Minister: Toshiki Kaifu
- Preceded by: Hiroshi Mitsuzuka
- Succeeded by: Michio Watanabe

Director-General of the Okinawa Development Agency
- In office 17 July 1980 – 30 November 1981
- Prime Minister: Zenkō Suzuki
- Preceded by: Keizō Obuchi
- Succeeded by: Kunio Tanabe

Member of the House of Representatives
- In office 8 July 1986 – 21 July 2009
- Preceded by: Sadao Wada
- Succeeded by: Osamu Nakagawa
- Constituency: Osaka 5th (1986–1996); Osaka 18th (1996–2009)

Member of the House of Councillors
- In office 8 July 1968 – 18 June 1986
- Preceded by: Fukuzo Nakayama
- Succeeded by: Kiyoshi Nishikawa
- Constituency: Osaka at-large

Member of the Osaka Prefectural Assembly
- In office 23 April 1955 – 8 June 1968
- Constituency: Osaka City Ikuno Ward

Personal details
- Born: 27 August 1924 Osaka, Japan
- Died: 15 March 2023 (aged 98) Sakai, Osaka, Japan
- Party: Liberal Democratic
- Parent(s): Fukuzō Nakayama; Masa Nakayama
- Relatives: Masaaki Nakayama (brother); Yasuhide Nakayama (nephew)
- Education: Osaka Medical College

Taro Nakayama (中山 太郎, Nakayama Tarō; 27 August 1924 – 15 March 2023) was a Japanese doctor and politician who served in the House of Councillors and the House of Representatives in the Diet (national legislature) as a member of the Liberal Democratic Party. A native of Osaka he received a Ph.D. in medicine from Osaka Medical College in 1960 for the study of infantile paralysis. After serving in the assembly of Osaka Prefecture he was elected to the Diet for the first time in 1968 as a member of the House of Councilors and to the House of Representatives for the first time in 1986. From 1989 to 1990 he served as Minister for Foreign Affairs in Toshiki Kaifu's cabinet (1989–1991).

Nakayama's parents, Fukuzō and Masa, were also politicians and members of the Diet, as are his brother Masaaki and nephew Yasuhide.

Nakayama also made history by hiring the first non-Japanese aide, Timothy Langley, into the Japanese Diet as was showcased on 60 Minutes.

Nakayama was affiliated to the openly revisionist organization Nippon Kaigi. He was a mentor to Nippon Ishin no Kai politician Nobuyuki Baba.

Nakayama died on 15 March 2023, at the age of 98.

House of Councillors
Preceded by Takenori Kato	Chair, Cabinet Affairs Committee of the House of Councillors of Japan; 1976–1977	Succeeded by Keikichi Masuhara
Preceded by Mutsuo Kimura	Chair, Rules and Administration Committee of the House of Councillors of Japan; 1979–1980	Succeeded by Tokutaro Higaki
Political offices
Preceded by Keizō Obuchi	Director General of Prime Minister's Office; 1980–1981	Succeeded by Kunio Tanabe
Preceded by Keizō Obuchi	Director General of Okinawa Development Agency; 1980–1981	Succeeded by Kunio Tanabe
Preceded by Hiroshi Mitsuzuka	Minister for Foreign Affairs; 1989–1991	Succeeded by Michio Watanabe
Honorary titles
Preceded by Sadanori Yamanaka	Oldest member of the House of Representatives of Japan; 2004–2009	Succeeded by Tetsuo Kutsukake
