= Toshio Yamauchi =

Japanese politician

- 山内 俊夫
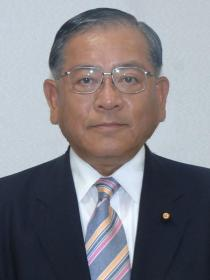
- Official portrait, 2008

Member of the House of Councillors
- In office 26 July 1998 – 25 July 2010
- Preceded by: Takushi Hirai
- Succeeded by: Yoshihiko Isozaki
- Constituency: Kagawa at-large

Member of the Kagawa Prefectural Assembly
- In office 1991–1998

Personal details
- Born: 17 December 1946 (age 79) Marugame, Kagawa, Japan
- Party: Liberal Democratic
- Other political affiliations: New Renaissance (2010)
- Education: Waseda University

Toshio Yamauchi (山内 俊夫, Yamauchi Toshio; born December 17, 1946) is a Japanese former politician of the Liberal Democratic Party, a member of the House of Councillors in the Diet (national legislature). A native of Marugame, Kagawa and graduate of Waseda University, he was elected to the House of Councillors for the first time in 1998 after serving in the assembly of Kagawa Prefecture since 1991.

House of Councillors
Preceded by Takushi Hirai	Councillor for Kagawa; 1998–2010	Succeeded by Yoshihiko Isozaki
Party political offices
New political party	General Council Chairman of the New Renaissance Party; Diet Affairs Committee Chairman of the New Renaissance Party; 2010–present	Incumbent
Political offices
Preceded by Kenshirō Matsunaka; Yasuko Ikenobō	Senior Vice Minister of Education, Culture, Sports, Science and Technology; 2008–2009; Served alongside: Hirokazu Matsuno	Succeeded by Masaharu Nakagawa; Kan Suzuki
