= Osaka 18th district =

Japan House of Representatives constituency

- Parliamentary constituency for the Japanese House of Representatives
- Numbered map of the Osaka Prefecture single seats
- Prefecture: Osaka
- Proportional District: Kinki
- Electorate: 426,329

Current constituency
- Created: 1994
- Seats: One
- Party: Ishin
- Representative: Takashi Endo
- Municipalities: Izumi, Izumiōtsu, Kishiwada, Takaishi, and Senboku District.

Osaka 18th district (大阪府第18区, Osaka-fu dai-ju-hakku or simply 大阪18区, Osaka-ju-hakku ) is a single-member constituency of the House of Representatives in the national Diet of Japan located in Osaka Prefecture.

== Areas covered ==
=== Since 1994 ===
- Izumi
- Izumiōtsu
- Kishiwada
- Takaishi
- Senboku District

== List of representatives ==
| Election | Representative | Party | Notes |
|---|---|---|---|
| 1996 | Taro Nakayama | LDP | |
| 2000 | Taro Nakayama | LDP | |
| 2003 | Taro Nakayama | LDP | |
| 2005 | Taro Nakayama | LDP | |
| 2009 | Osamu Nakagawa | Democratic | |
| 2009 | Osamu Nakagawa | PLF | |
| 2009 | Osamu Nakagawa | Tomorrow | |
| 2012 | Takashi Endo | Restoration | |
| 2014 | Takashi Endo | Innovation | |
| 2017 | Takashi Endo | Ishin | |
| 2021 | Takashi Endo | Ishin | |
| 2024 | Takashi Endo | Ishin | |
| 2026 | Takashi Endo | Ishin | |

== Election results ==
=== 2026 ===
2026
| Party | Candidate | Votes | % | ±% |
|---|---|---|---|---|
| Ishin | Takashi Endo | 121,948 | 58.4 | ▲7.2 |
| LDP | Takatsugu Uchida | 58,889 | 28.2 | ▲4.4 |
| JCP | Hideki Baba | 27,906 | 13.4 | ▼0.8 |
| Registered electors | | 424,263 | | |
| Turnout | | | 52.90 | ▲5.21 |
| Ishin hold | | | | |

=== 2024 ===
2024
| Party | Candidate | Votes | % | ±% |
|---|---|---|---|---|
| Ishin | Takashi Endo | 99,973 | 51.24 | |
| LDP | Takatsugu Uchida | 46,366 | 23.77 | |
| JCP | Hideki Baba | 27,675 | 14.19 | |
| Sanseitō | Yoshinori Matsuoka | 21,086 | 10.81 | New |
| Majority | | 53,607 | 27.47 | |
| Registered electors | | 427,656 | | |
| Turnout | | | 47.69 | ▼5.22 |
| Ishin hold | | | | |

=== 2021 ===
2021
| Party | Candidate | Votes | % | ±% |
|---|---|---|---|---|
| Ishin | Takashi Endo | 118,421 | 52.97 | |
| LDP | Noboru Kamitani | 61,597 | 27.55 | |
| CDP | Yasushi Kawato | 24,490 | 10.95 | New |
| JCP | Ryosuke Mochizuki | 19,075 | 8.53 | |
| Majority | | 56,824 | 25.42 | |
| Registered electors | | 434,309 | | |
| Turnout | | | 52.91 | ▲6.64 |
| Ishin hold | | | | |

=== 2017 ===
2017
| Party | Candidate | Votes | % | ±% |
|---|---|---|---|---|
| Ishin | Takashi Endo | 87,040 | 44.32 | New |
| LDP | Noboru Kamitani (Won PR seat) | 80,198 | 40.83 | |
| JCP | Tadashige Yano | 29,164 | 14.85 | |
| Majority | | 6,842 | 3.49 | |
| Registered electors | | 437,120 | | |
| Turnout | | | 46.27 | ▼2.43 |
| Ishin hold | | | | |

=== 2014 ===
2014
| Party | Candidate | Votes | % | ±% |
|---|---|---|---|---|
| Innovation | Takashi Endo | 88,638 | 44.24 | New |
| LDP | Noboru Kamitani (Won PR seat) | 82,460 | 41.15 | |
| JCP | Tadashige Yano | 29,275 | 14.61 | |
| Majority | | 6,178 | 3.09 | |
| Registered electors | | 425,818 | | |
| Turnout | | | 48.70 | ▼7.24 |
| Innovation hold | | | | |

=== 2012 ===
2012
| Party | Candidate | Votes | % | ±% |
|---|---|---|---|---|
| Restoration | Takashi Endo | 100,312 | 43.68 | New |
| LDP | Noboru Kamitani | 83,388 | 36.31 | |
| Tomorrow | Osamu Nakagawa | 24,467 | 10.65 | New |
| JCP | Tadashige Yano | 21,500 | 9.36 | |
| Majority | | 16,924 | 7.37 | |
| Registered electors | | 425,921 | | |
| Turnout | | | 55.94 | ▼9.55 |
| Restoration gain from Tomorrow | | | | |

=== 2009 ===
2009
| Party | Candidate | Votes | % | ±% |
|---|---|---|---|---|
| Democratic | Osamu Nakagawa | 132,399 | 48.60 | |
| LDP | Taro Nakayama | 104,699 | 38.43 | |
| JCP | Yasuki Ōtsuka | 27,440 | 10.07 | |
| Happiness Realization | Yutaka Nishikawa | 7,915 | 2.91 | New |
| Majority | | 27,700 | 10.17 | |
| Registered electors | | 424,742 | | |
| Turnout | | | 65.49 | ▲1.30 |
| Democratic gain from LDP | | | | |

=== 2005 ===
2005
| Party | Candidate | Votes | % | ±% |
|---|---|---|---|---|
| LDP | Taro Nakayama | 139,616 | 52.90 | |
| Democratic | Osamu Nakagawa | 93,402 | 35.39 | |
| JCP | Yasuki Ōtsuka | 30,912 | 11.71 | |
| Majority | | 46,214 | 17.51 | |
| Registered electors | | 420,929 | | |
| Turnout | | | 64.19 | ▲7.94 |
| LDP hold | | | | |

=== 2003 ===
2003
| Party | Candidate | Votes | % | ±% |
|---|---|---|---|---|
| LDP | Taro Nakayama | 108,996 | 47.94 | |
| Democratic | Osamu Nakagawa (Won PR seat) | 89,930 | 39.56 | |
| JCP | Yasuki Ōtsuka | 28,417 | 12.50 | |
| Majority | | 19,066 | 8.38 | |
| Registered electors | | 417,574 | | |
| Turnout | | | 56.25 | |
| LDP hold | | | | |

=== 2000 ===
2000
| Party | Candidate | Votes | % | ±% |
|---|---|---|---|---|
| LDP | Taro Nakayama | 103,402 | 47.47 | |
| Democratic | Makoto Kita | 64,259 | 29.50 | New |
| JCP | Nobuo Kokubo | 42,750 | 19.63 | |
| Liberal League | Shinobu Okitsu | 7,402 | 3.40 | |
| Majority | | 39,143 | 17.97 | |
| Registered electors | | | | |
| Turnout | | | | |
| LDP hold | | | | |

=== 1996 ===
1996
| Party | Candidate | Votes | % | ±% |
|---|---|---|---|---|
| LDP | Taro Nakayama | 88,147 | 41.82 | New |
| New Frontier | Yasuto Ōnishi | 78,822 | 37.39 | New |
| JCP | Nobuo Kokubo | 38,932 | 18.47 | New |
| Liberal League | Tatsuya Matsumoto | 4,892 | 2.32 | New |
| Majority | | 9,325 | 4.43 | |
| Registered electors | | | | |
| Turnout | | | | |
| LDP win (new seat) | | | | |
