= Katsuto Momii =

Japanese businessman

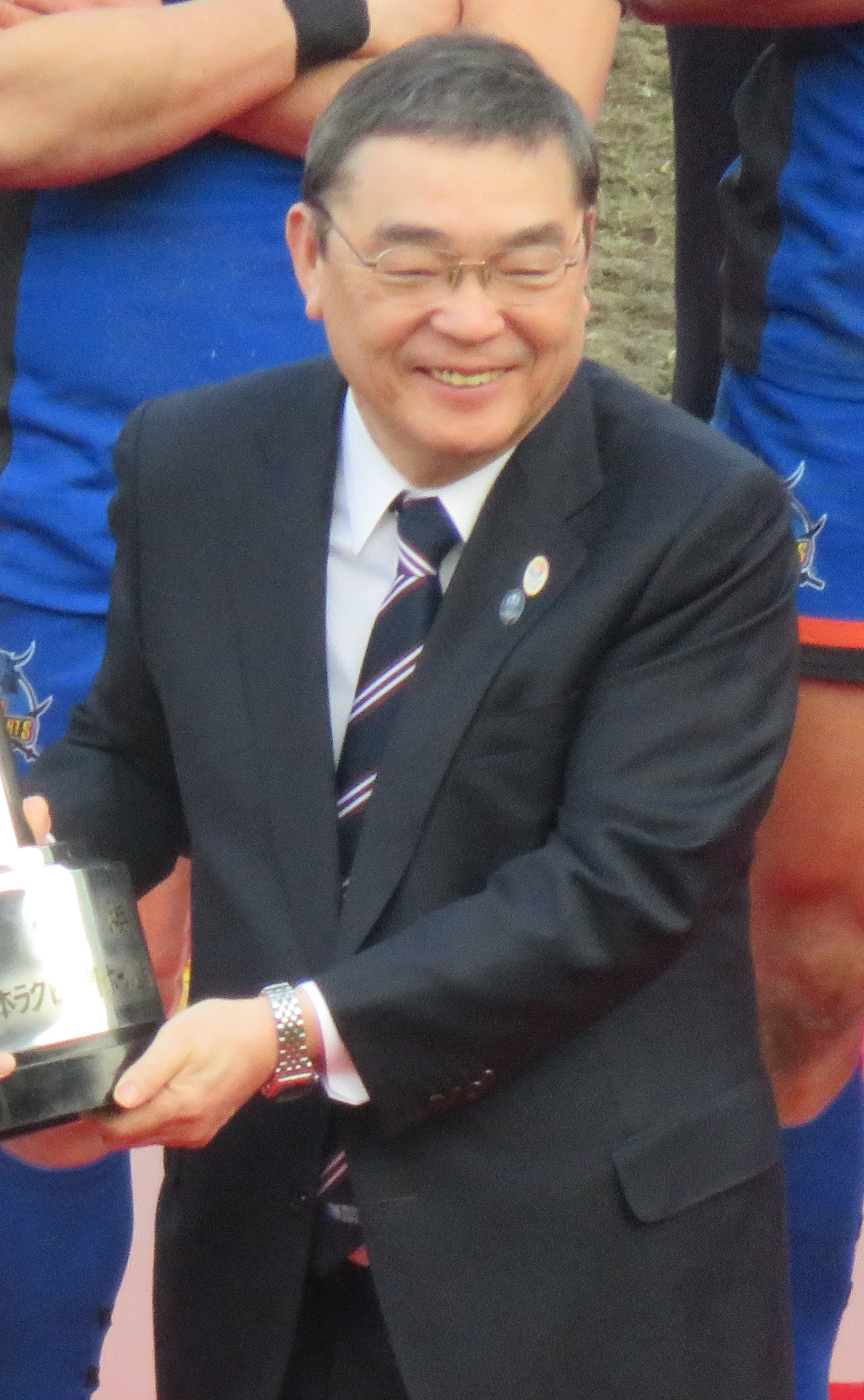
- Born: March 4, 1943 (age 83); Yamada, Fukuoka Prefecture
- Citizenship: Japan
- Education: Department of Economics, Kyushu University
- Occupation: Director-General of NHK (2013–2017)

Katsuto Momii (籾井 勝人, Momii Katsuto; born 4 March 1943) is a Japanese businessman who was elected as NHK's 21st Director-General on 20 December 2013. He worked for Mitsui & Co. from 1965 until 2005. From 2005 until 2011, he worked as President and representative director of Unisys Japan.

== NHK ==
On 25 January 2014 at his first interview with the press upon being appointed Director-General Momii caused controversy by playing down the issue of comfort women and whether they were forced to work in Japanese military brothels during World War II. On taking the helm of Japan's public broadcaster, he also announced that NHK should support the Japanese government in its coverage, telling his inaugural press conference: "We cannot say left when the government says right." During the 2016 Kumamoto earthquakes, Momii instructed NHK's journalists that their coverage must be "based on official government announcements" to prevent them from making unapproved reports about the safety of a nearby nuclear plant. He also told NHK to adhere to the official Japanese government line in its coverage of territorial disputes with China, Taiwan and South Korea. It was subsequently reported by Kyodo News that on his first day at NHK Momii asked members of the executive team to hand in their resignation on the grounds that they had all been appointed by his predecessor.
