= Anti-Conspiracy Bill =

The so-called Anti-Conspiracy Bill (共謀罪法案 kyōbōzai hōan), a bill intended to modify the Act on Punishment of Organized Crimes and Control of Crime Proceeds, was submitted to the Japanese National Diet on 21 March 2017 and passed on 15 June 2017.

== Letter from the United Nations Special Rapporteur on the right to privacy ==
In a letter dated 18 May 2017, the United Nations special rapporteur on the right to privacy, Joseph Cannataci wrote a letter to the Japanese Prime-Minister, Shinzō Abe, expressing concerns about the bill. The United Nations Special Rapporteur is an individual, independent expert appointed by the United Nations Human Rights Council to investigate, monitor, advise upon, and publicize the human rights situation in specific countries. Joseph Cannataci wrote that the bill,

Would permit the application of laws for crimes which appear to be totally unrelated with the scope of organized crime and terrorism, such as ... theft of forestry products in reserved forests ... exporting without permission and destroying important cultural properties.

and that,

Serious concern is expressed that the proposed bill, in its current form and in combination with other legislation, may affect the exercise of the right to privacy as well as other fundamental public freedoms given its potential broad application. In particular I am concerned by the risks of arbitrary application of this legislation given the vague definition of what would constitute the 'planning' and 'preparatory actions' and given the inclusion of an overbroad range of crimes in the Appendix which are apparently unrelated to terrorism and organized crime.

— Joseph Cannataci, "Mandate of the Special Rapporteur of the right to privacy" (PDF). United Nations Human Rights Officer of the High Commissioner.

At a press conference on May 22, the Chief Cabinet Secretary Yoshihide Suga responded aggressively to the letter, saying, "The letter was released unilaterally without the Japanese government or the Ministry of Foreign Affairs having had the opportunity to directly explain the legislation (to Cannataci). The content was inappropriate, and we lodged a strong protest" with Cannataci. Cannataci responded in a second letter that "The 'strong protest' received from the Japanese government was just angry words but no substance ... It did not address even one of my many concerns about privacy or other defects. ... There is absolutely no justification for the Japanese government to behave in this way and push through seriously defective legislation in such a rush."

== Background ==
The reason this law was created was to implement the United Nations Convention against Transnational Organized Crime. As for the theft of forest products, it has been suggested that it could be a potential source of funding for terrorism. Japan became the 188th country to become a party to the convention.
