= Minister of the Environment (Japan) =

Japanese cabinet role

- Emblem of the Government of Japan

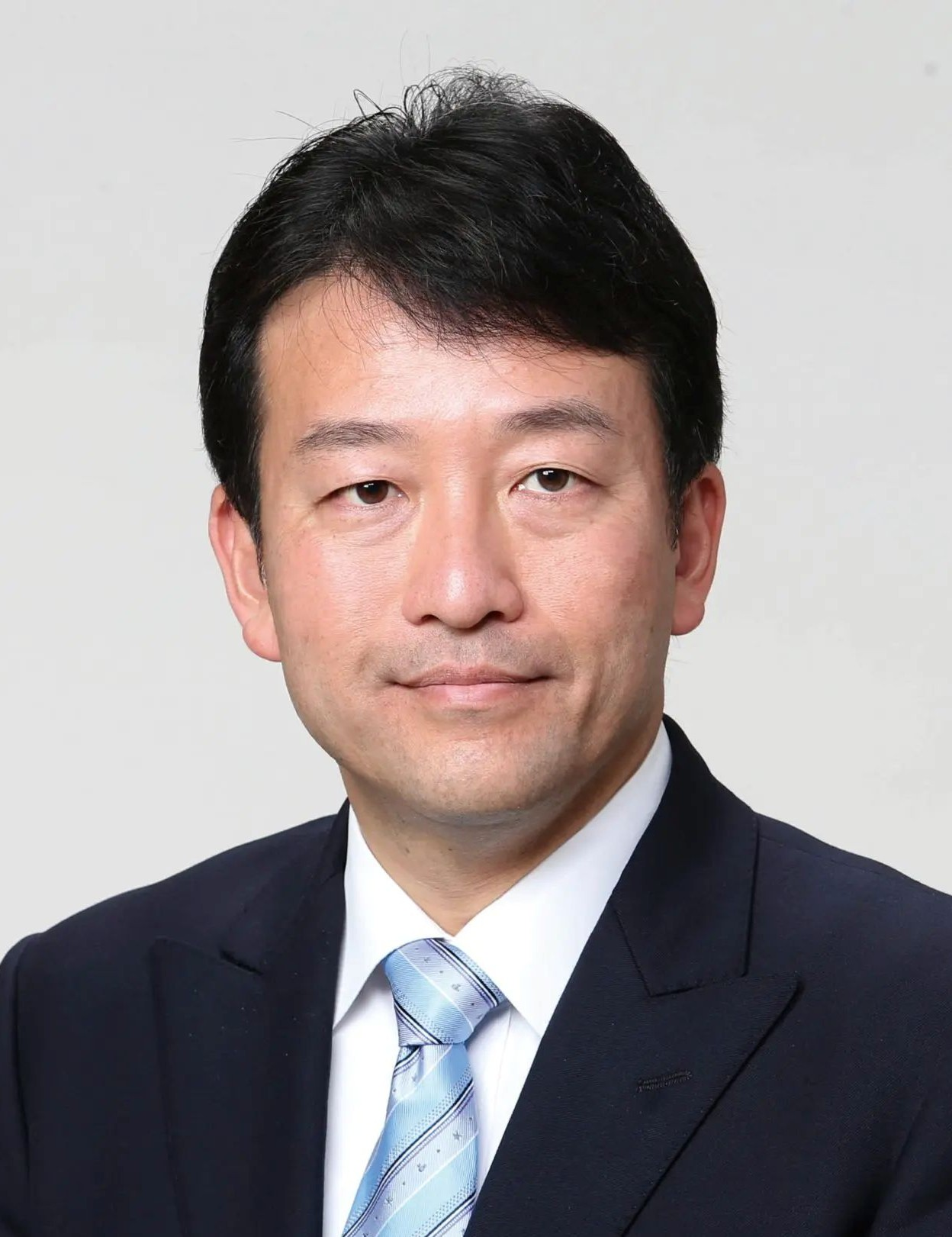
- Incumbent; Hiroyoshi Sasagawa since 17 September 2026
- Ministry of the Environment
- Style: His Excellency
- Member of: Cabinet of Japan
- Reports to: Prime Minister of Japan
- Nominator: Prime Minister of Japan
- Appointer: Emperor of Japan; attested to by the Emperor
- Precursor: Director-General of the Environmental Agency
- Formation: January 6, 2001; 25 years ago
- Deputy: State Minister of the Environment
- Salary: ¥20,916,000

The Minister of the Environment (環境大臣, Kankyou Daijin) is a member of the Cabinet of Japan and is the leader and chief executive of the Ministry of the Environment. The minister is nominated by the Prime Minister of Japan and is appointed by the Emperor of Japan.

The current minister is Hiroyoshi Sasagawa, who took office on 17 September 2026.

== List of ministers of the environment (2001–2025) ==
Liberal Democratic
New Komeito/Komeito
Democratic

Minister			Term of office			Prime Minister
#	Portrait	Name	Took office	Left office	Days	Prime Minister
1		Yoriko Kawaguchi	January 6, 2001	February 8, 2002	398	Yoshirō Mori
1		Yoriko Kawaguchi	January 6, 2001	February 8, 2002	398	Junichiro Koizumi
2		Hiroshi Ōki	February 8, 2002	September 30, 2002	234	Junichiro Koizumi
3		Shun'ichi Suzuki	September 30, 2002	September 22, 2003	357	Junichiro Koizumi
4		Yuriko Koike	September 22, 2003	September 26, 2006	1100	Junichiro Koizumi
5		Masatoshi Wakabayashi	September 26, 2006	August 27, 2007	335	Shinzō Abe
6		Ichirō Kamoshita	August 27, 2007	August 2, 2008	341	Shinzō Abe
6		Ichirō Kamoshita	August 27, 2007	August 2, 2008	341	Yasuo Fukuda
7		Tetsuo Saito	August 2, 2008	September 16, 2009	410	Yasuo Fukuda
7		Tetsuo Saito	August 2, 2008	September 16, 2009	410	Taro Aso
8		Sakihito Ozawa	September 16, 2009	September 21, 2010	370	Yukio Hatoyama
8		Sakihito Ozawa	September 16, 2009	September 21, 2010	370	Naoto Kan
9		Ryu Matsumoto	September 21, 2010	June 27, 2011	279	Naoto Kan
10		Satsuki Eda	June 27, 2011	September 2, 2011	67	Naoto Kan
11		Goshi Hosono	September 2, 2011	October 1, 2012	395	Yoshihiko Noda
12		Hiroyuki Nagahama	October 1, 2012	December 26, 2012	86	Yoshihiko Noda
13		Nobuteru Ishihara	December 26, 2012	September 3, 2014	616	Shinzō Abe
14		Yoshio Mochizuki	September 3, 2014	October 7, 2015	399	Shinzō Abe
15		Tamayo Marukawa	October 7, 2015	August 3, 2016	301	Shinzō Abe
16		Koichi Yamamoto	August 3, 2016	August 3, 2017	365	Shinzō Abe
17		Masaharu Nakagawa	August 3, 2017	October 2, 2018	425	Shinzō Abe
18		Yoshiaki Harada	October 2, 2018	September 11, 2019	344	Shinzō Abe
19		Shinjirō Koizumi	September 11, 2019	October 4, 2021	754	Yoshihide Suga
20		Tsuyoshi Yamaguchi	October 4, 2021	August 10, 2022	310	Fumio Kishida
21		Akihiro Nishimura	August 10, 2022	September 13, 2023	399	Fumio Kishida
22		Shintaro Ito	September 13, 2023	October 1, 2024	384	Fumio Kishida
23		Keiichiro Asao	October 1, 2024	October 21, 2025	385	Shigeru Ishiba
24		Hirotaka Ishihara	October 21, 2025	September 17, 2026	331	Sanae Takaichi
25		Hiroyoshi Sasagawa	September 17, 2026	Incumbent	0	Sanae Takaichi
