= Higuchi =

Higuchi (樋口; literally "mouth of the drain") is a common Japanese surname.

== People with the surname ==
- Akihiro Higuchi, Ukrainian-born film director known by his alias Higuchinsky
- Asa Higuchi (ひぐち アサ; born 1970), Japanese manga artist
- Chieko Higuchi (樋口 智恵子; born 1981), Japanese voice actress
- Daisuke Higuchi (樋口 大輔; born 1966), Japanese manga artist
- Dean Higuchi, American professional wrestler better known as Dean Ho
- Hirotaro Higuchi (樋口 廣太郎; born 1926), Japanese business executive
- Hisako Higuchi (樋口 久子; born 1945), Japanese golfer
- Ichiyō Higuchi (樋口 一葉; 1872–1896), Japanese Meiji-era author
- Kanako Higuchi (樋口 可南子; born 1958), Japanese actress
- Kanetsugu Higuchi (樋口 兼続; 1559–1620), Japanese samurai better known as Naoe Kanetsugu
- Kazusada Higuchi (樋口 和貞; born 1988), Japanese professional wrestler
- Keiko Higuchi (樋口 恵子; born 1932), Japanese journalist
- Keiko Sofía Fujimori Higuchi (born 1975), Peruvian politician, daughter of Alberto Fujimori and Susana Higuchi
- Kenji Higuchi (樋口 健二; born 1937), Japanese photographer
- Kiichiro Higuchi (樋口 季一郎; 1888–1970), Imperial Army lieutenant-general
- Kozo Higuchi (樋口 浩三; born 1956), Japanese swimmer
- Munetaka Higuchi (樋口 宗孝; 1958 – 2008), Japanese drummer for the band Loudness
- Naomi Higuchi (樋口 直巳; born 1961), Japanese sport wrestler
- Shinji Higuchi (樋口 真嗣; born 1965), Japanese storyboard artist
- Sojiro Higuchi (樋口 壮士朗; born 1992), Japanese professional wrestler better known as Jiro Kuroshio
- Susana Higuchi, Peruvian politician, wife of Alberto Fujimori and mother of Keiko Sofía Fujimori Higuchi
- Tachibana Higuchi (樋口 橘; born 1976), Japanese manga artist
- Tadao Higuchi (樋口 忠男; 1916 - 1992), Japanese photographer
- Tokihiko Higuchi (樋口 時彦; born 1941), Japanese volleyball player
- Yasuhiro Higuchi (樋口 靖洋; born 1961), Japanese football player
- Wakaba Higuchi (樋口新葉, born 2001), Japanese figure skater
- William Higuchi (樋口 宇生利明夢), American chemist and professor
- Yuta Higuchi (樋口 雄太; born 1996), Japanese footballer
- Yutaka Higuchi (figure skater) (樋口 豊; born 1949), Japanese figure skater
- Yutaka Higuchi (bassist) (桶口 豊; born 1967), Japanese bassist for the band Buck-Tick

== Fictional characters ==
- Kotaro Higuchi (樋口 湖太郎), Pita-Ten character
- Kyosuke Higuchi (火口 卿介), Death Note character

== Others ==
- Higuchi Station (Ibaraki)
- Higuchi Station (Saitama)
