= Yuki Waseda =

Japanese politician

- 早稲田 夕季
- Waseda in 2026

Member of the House of Representatives
- Incumbent
- Assumed office 22 October 2017
- Preceded by: Keiichiro Asao
- Constituency: Kanagawa 4th (2017–2026); Southern Kanto PR (2026–present)

Member of the Kanagawa Prefectural Assembly
- In office 30 April 2011 – 25 September 2017
- Constituency: Kamakura City

Member of the Kamakura City Assembly
- In office 2005–2011

Personal details
- Born: 6 December 1958 (age 67) Shibuya, Tokyo, Japan
- Party: DRP (since 2026)
- Other political affiliations: DPJ (2005–2016); DP (2016–2017); CDP (2017–2026); CRA (2026)
- Education: Waseda University (LLB)

Yuki Waseda (born 6 December 1958) is a Japanese politician who is a member of the House of Representatives of Japan.

== Biography ==
She graduated from the Waseda University School of Law and worked for a bank. She was elected in 2017 and 2021.
