= Mohammad Shorif Uddin =

Bangladeshi academic

Professor Dr. Mohammad Shorif Uddin
- মোহাম্মদ শরীফ উদ্দিন

Vice-Chancellor of Green University of Bangladesh
- Incumbent
- Assumed office May 16, 2024
- Chancellor: President Mirza Fakhrul Islam Alamgir
- Preceded by: Golam Samdani Fakir

Personal details
- Education: Bangladesh University of Engineering and Technology; Shiga University; Kyoto Institute of Technology

Mohammad Shorif Uddin (Bengali: মোহাম্মদ শরীফ উদ্দিন) is a Bangladeshi academic serving as the vice-chancellor of Green University of Bangladesh since May 16, 2024. He was appointed by the President of Bangladesh, Mohammed Shahabuddin, on March 28, 2024, for a four-year term.

== Biography ==
Shorif Uddin completed his undergraduate studies in electrical and electronic engineering at Bangladesh University of Engineering and Technology in 1991. He earned a master's degree in technology education from Shiga University, Japan, and a PhD in engineering from Kyoto Institute of Technology in 2002.

=== Career ===
He began his career as a lecturer at Chittagong University of Engineering & Technology in 1991. In 1992, he joined the Department of Computer Science and Engineering at Jahangirnagar University, where he held positions such as department chairman and head of the engineering and ICT cells.

Shorif Uddin was appointed vice-chancellor of Green University of Bangladesh on March 28, 2024, and took office on May 16, 2024.
