= Shiga University =

National university in Shiga, Japan

Coordinates: 35°16′38″N 136°14′46″E

- 滋賀大学
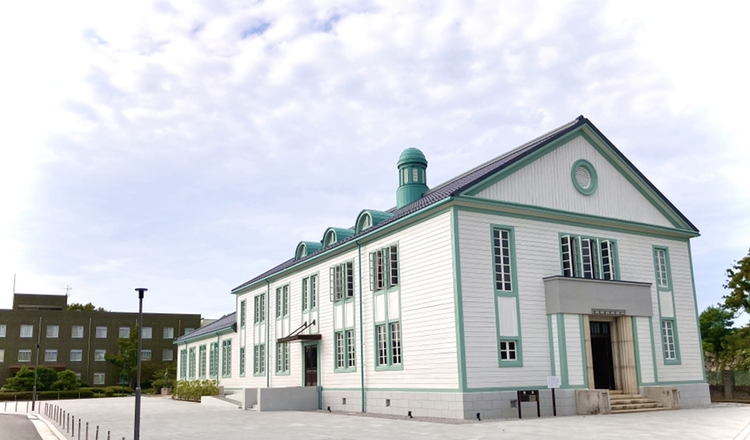
- Shiga University Auditorium, Hikone Campus (renovated in 2020, Nationally Registered Tangible Cultural Property) where the commemorative lecture was given by Helen Keller on May 7, 1937 and Headquarter Building
- Motto: 素顔で学ぶ、素直に生きる [To learn with accepting yourself as you are, to live honestly]
- Type: Public (National)
- Established: May 1949; Founded: 1874
- President: Ryuichi Ida
- Academic staff: 413 (as of May 1, 2020): Faculty of Economics: 77; Faculty of Education: 99; Faculty of Data Science: 22; Affiliated Highschool, etc: 215
- Undergraduates: 3,502 as of 30 November 2020
- Postgraduates: 215 as of 30 November 2020
- Location: Hikone, Otsu, Shiga Prefecture, Japan
- Foreign Students: 158 from 10 countries as of May 1, 2016
- Nickname: Shigadai
- Mascot: Kamon-chan
- Athletics: 26 varsity teams
- Website: http://www.shiga-u.ac.jp/english/

Shiga University (滋賀大学, Shiga daigaku) or Shigadai (滋賀大, Shigadai) is a national university in Shiga Prefecture, Japan, with campuses in the cities of Ōtsu and Hikone. Founded in 1874, it was chartered as a university in 1949.

== Faculties & Graduate Schools ==
Shiga University has three faculties, the Faculty of Education in Ōtsu Campus, the Faculty of Economics, the largest among national universities and the Faculty of Data Science, the first for faculty in Japan where students can systematically study data science, which is essential for Society 5.0, in Hikone Campus. Each faculty has a graduate school.

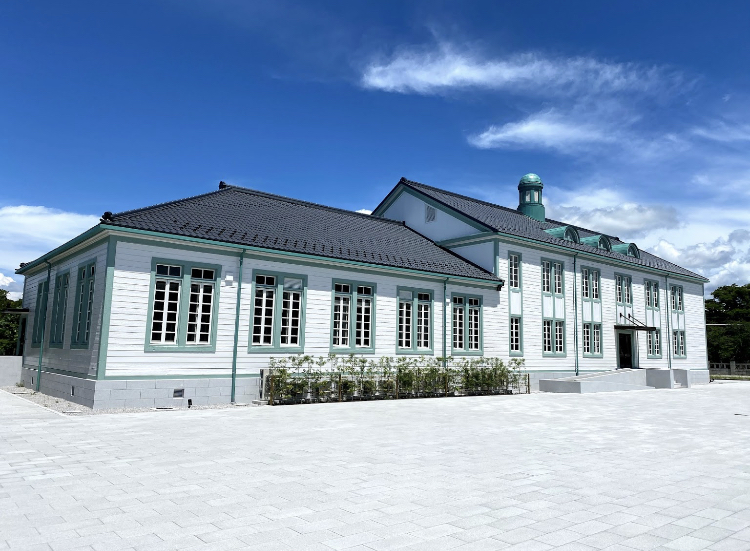
Shiga University Auditorium (renovated in 2020, Nationally Registered Tangible Cultural Property) located on the grounds of the Faculty of Economics in Hikone

See also "The improvement work of Shiga University Auditorium"

=== The Faculty of Education ===
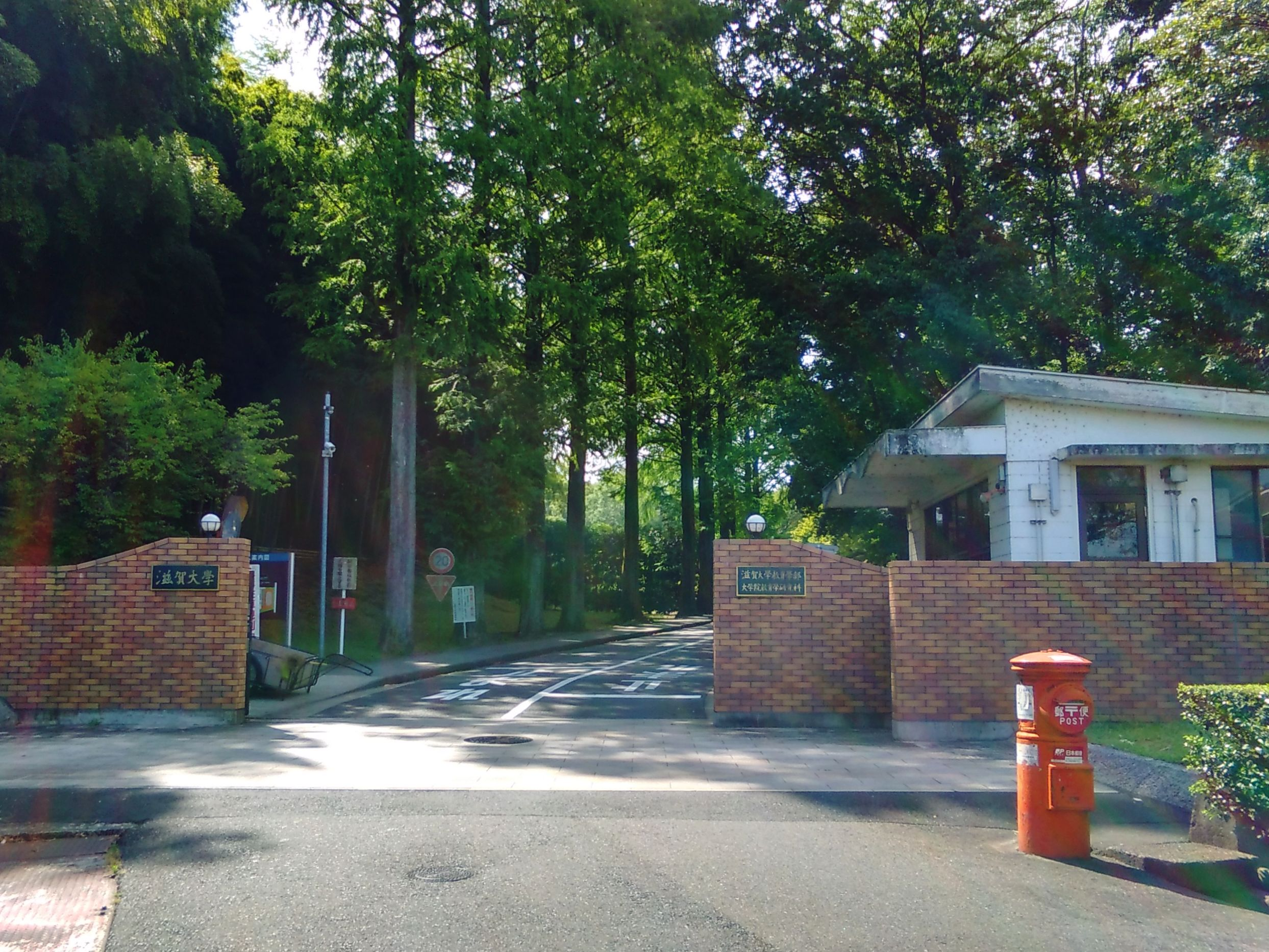
The Entrance of Otsu Campus of Shiga University

The Faculty of Education consists of three departments:

(1) Department of School Teachers' Training, which aims to develop teachers with attractive personality as well as practical leadership to respond productively to the new school education;

(2) Department of Environment Education, which aims to enhance understanding of current environmental systems and problems and encourage students to create new ways to solve problems they are facing.

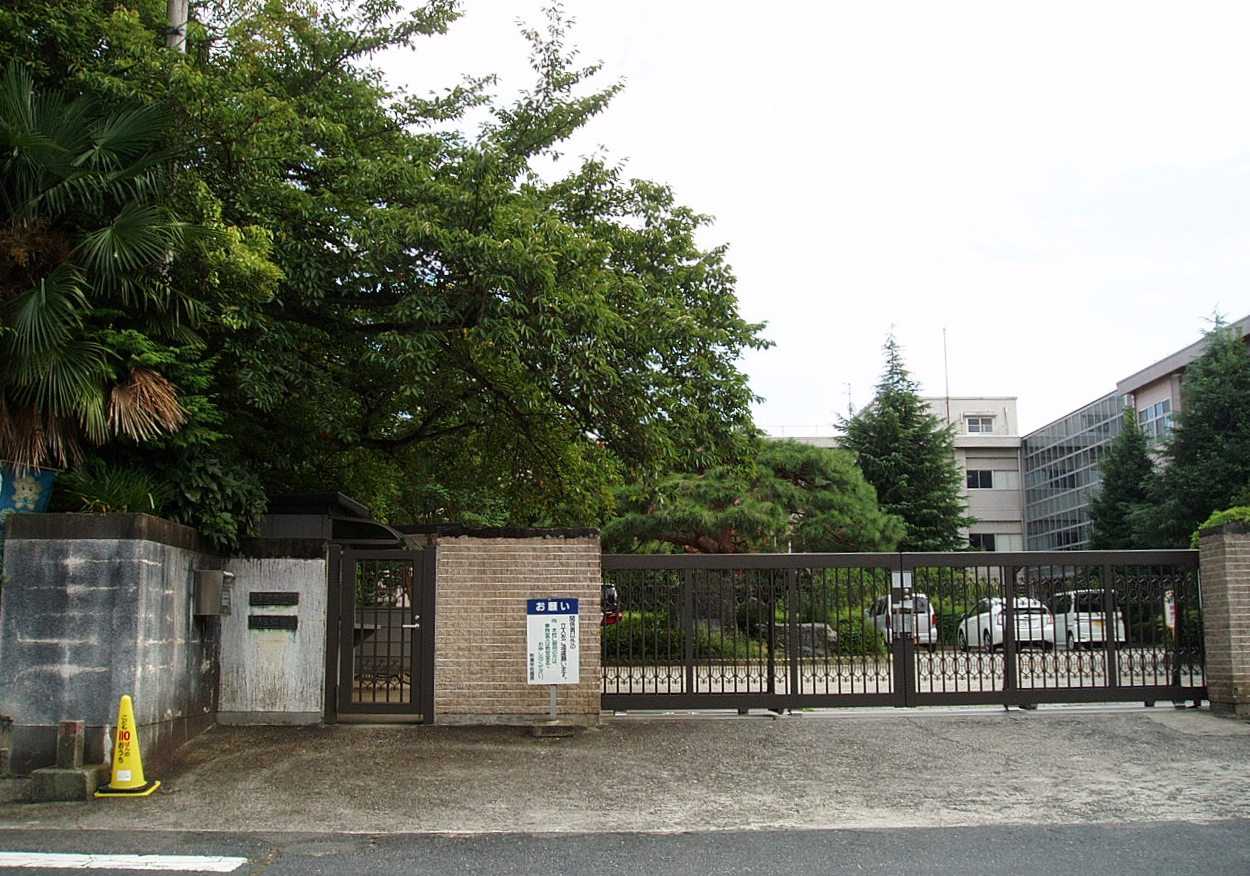
Main Entrance to the Affiliated Schools (kindergarten, elementary school and junior high school) of the Faculty of Education of Shiga University located in Ōtsu

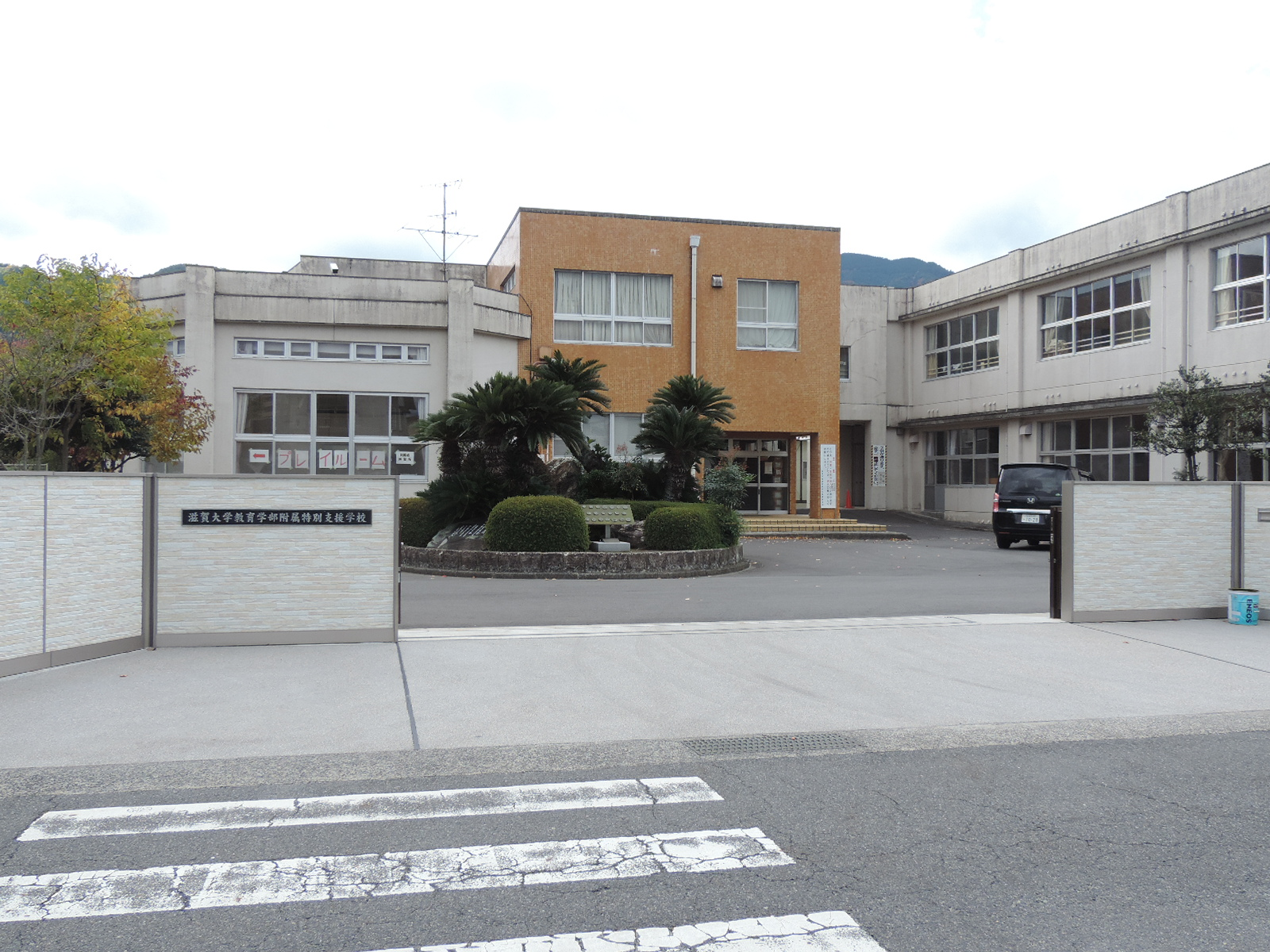
Special Support School attached to the Faculty of Education of Shiga University located in Ōtsu

==== Graduate School of Education ====
School Education (Master's Degree)

School Education offers 3 courses: Educational Science, Special Education, and Development of Teaching Materials

(1) Educational Science

The Educational Science course offers classes focusing on educational foundations and methods, development and learning.

- Educational Science
- Special Education

(2) The Special Education course offers classes focusing on the theory of educational practice, classes focusing on neuropsychology and clinical child development, and classes focusing on medicine for disabled children.

- Special Education

(3) Development of Teaching Materials

The Development of Teaching Materials course offers various specialization classes, with subject education, teaching material development, and lesson observation, and includes practical and theoretical education research.

- Japanese Education
- Social Studies Education
- Mathematics Education
- Science Education
- Music Education
- Visual Arts Education
- Health and Physical Education
- Technology Education
- Home Economics Education
- English Education
- Environmental Education

Advanced Professional Development for Teachers (Professional Degree Program in Education)

Advanced Professional Development for Teachers offers 2 courses: the Professional Development Course for School Management and the Professional Development Course for Curriculum and Instruction, Guidance, Classroom Management.

(1) Professional Development Course for School Management

The Professional Development Course for School Management is aimed at currently practicing teachers and focuses on improving school management skills.

- Professional Development Course for School Management

(2) Professional Development Course for Curriculum and Instruction, Guidance, Classroom Management

The Professional Development Course for Curriculum and Instruction, Guidance, Classroom Management is aimed at fresh graduates from the Faculty of Education and currently practicing teachers, and focuses on improving practical skills, including lesson and class management skills.

- Professional Development Course for Curriculum and Instruction, Guidance, Classroom Management

=== The Faculty of Economics ===
The Faculty of Economics consists of six departments. All disciplines of Economics aim to develop specialists in economics with a global perspective and a problem solving ability capable of responding to the needs of a global information society.

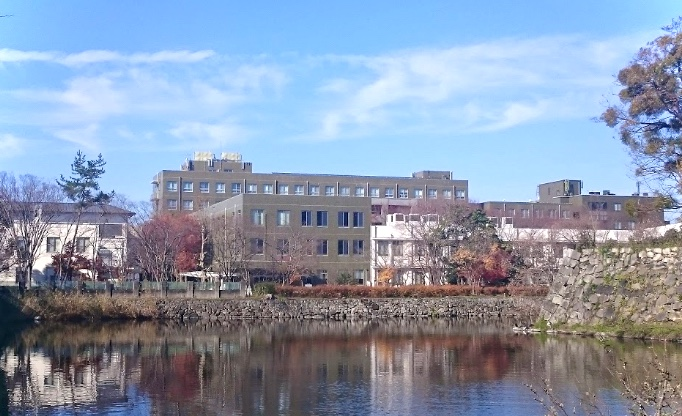
The Faculty of Economics in Hikone with the moat and stone wall of Hikone Castle

==== Graduate School of Economics ====
Objective

The academic objective of the Graduate School of Economics is to develop professionals with advanced expertise, as well as specialist researchers in specific fields. The common goal is educating global specialists, namely, businesspeople with a broad-based acumen and advanced expertise that speaks volumes in this age of globalization.

Overview

With the doctoral program in Economic and Business Risk established in 2003, the Graduate School of Economics now comprises three master's programs and one doctoral program. An outgrowth of the master's program in "Economics" (Accounting and Management) established in 1955, the School made a new start in 1973 with two master's programs in "Economics" and "Business administration", and added a master's program in "Global Finance", geared more to the development of professionals with advanced skills, in 2001.

The Graduate School of Economics aims to train professionals with advanced expertise, as well as specialist researchers in specific fields. The Master's Program comprises three fields of specialization as above-mentioned, and the Doctoral Program comprises three fields of education and research which are "Basic Research in Risk Analysis", "Research in Risk Management" and "Research in Risk and Creativity".

=== The Faculty of Data Science ===
The Department of Data Science is the first for faculty in Japan to meet a real society demand for rich imaginative leaders who use data efficiently. The curriculum provides the latest science in 21st century called “data science” (data centric science) which transcends conventional informatics and statistics along with the development of ICT (Information and Communication Technology).

==== Graduate School of Data Science ====
The Graduate School of Data Science offers the curriculum to learn project management and models unique to application domains as well as methodologies of data science and real-world examples. By understanding real-world data and experiencing the process of problem-solving through project research, students will not only acquire knowledge but also experience success in problem-solving and gain the ability to create values from data.

== History ==
The predecessor of the current school, the Shiga College of Education, was established in 1943 which originated from the Shiga Normal School, so-renamed in 1875 one year later after founded as the Training Institute for Elementary School Teachers in 1874. Thereafter in 1949 three colleges, namely the above-mentioned Shiga College of Education, Shiga Teachers Training College and Hikone Commercial College known as Hikone Kōshō which was founded in 1922, were combined into one institution and it was chartered as a university.

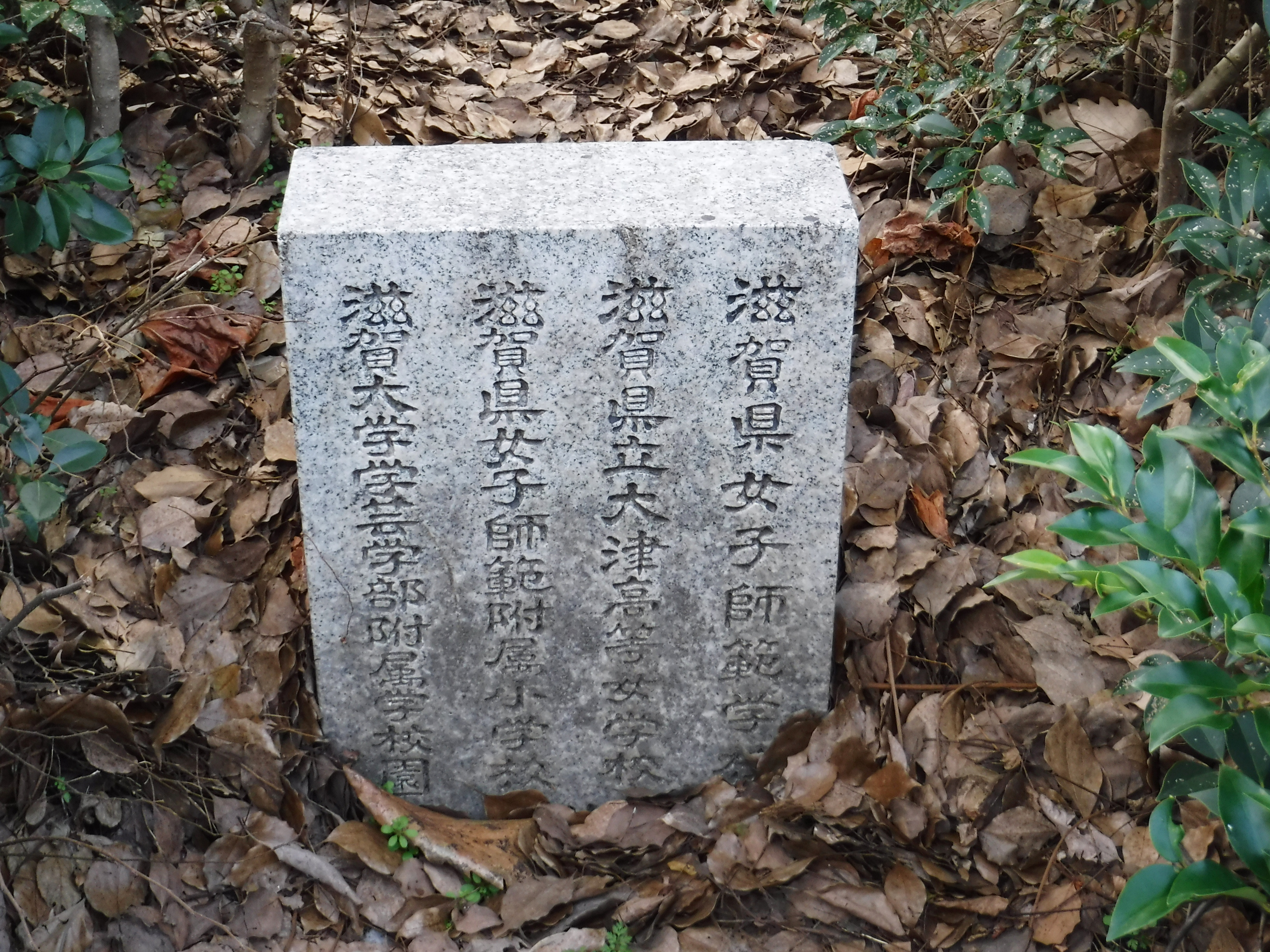
Memorial of Shiga Prefectural Girls' Normal School, one of the predecessors of Shiga University, located in Otsu, Shiga Prefecture

The Otsu campus of Shiga University has its origin in the establishment of Shiga Normal School in Otsu in 1874. This school was reorganized as the Shiga College of Education in 1943. Upon the founding of Shiga University in May, 1949, the Shiga College of Education and the Shiga Teachers Training College were brought together as the Faculty of Liberal Arts.

The Hikone campus has its origin in the establishment of the Hikone Commercial College in 1922 when Kizo Yasui as the town mayor of Hikone (Then Hikone was not a city but a town under the old system) had been making every effort to establish this college. This college was reorganized in 1944 as the Hikone College of Economics. At the time Shiga University was founded in May, 1949, the college had become the Faculty of Economics.

The administrative offices of the university are located on the Hikone campus.

The following table shows the development and reorganization of Shiga University since its foundation in 1949:

Year	Developments
1949	In accordance with National School Establishment Law, Shiga University is founded as a coeducational national university, consisting of the Faculty of Liberal Arts in Otsu, and the Faculty of Economics in Hikone.Both the Main Library on the Hikone campus and the Branch Library of Faculty of Liberal Arts on the Otsu campus are established.
1951	An elementary school and a junior high school, attached to the Faculty of Liberal Arts, are established.
1953	The Junior College of Economics is established and offers evening courses in Business Administration.
1955	A kindergarten attached to the Faculty of Liberal Arts is established.Post-graduate courses in Accounting and Business Administration are established.
1957	The Library of the Faculty of Economics is established.
1963	The four-year Faculty of Liberal Arts course is divided into two courses: the Elementary School Teachers Course and the Junior High School Teachers Course.
1966	The Faculty of Liberal Arts is renamed the Faculty of Education.The Branch Library of the Faculty of Liberal Arts is renamed the Library of the Faculty of Education.A certificate course in Pedagogy is established.
1967	A Special Education Teachers Course is established. The Economic History and Archival Museum of the Faculty of Economics is renamed the Faculty of Economics Archival Museum.
1972	The Department of Management Science of the Faculty of Economics is estab-lished.
1973	The Graduate School of Economics and Business Administration in the Faculty of Economics is established.The post-graduate courses in Economics are abolished.
1974	The course for Kindergarten Teachers in the Faculty of Education is established.
1975	A provisional course in Special Education is established. Business Management and Business Information Processing are added to the Junior College of Business Administration curriculum.
1976	The Research Center for Lake Science in the Faculty of Education is renamed the Research Institute for Lake Science.
1977	The Department of Accounting in the Faculty of Economics is established.
1978	The Health and Medical Services Center, and the Shiga University Attached Special School for the Mentally Handicapped are established.
1981	A certificate course in Special Education (Education of the Mentally Handicapped) is established.The provisional course for Special Education Teachers is abolished.
1985	The University Computer Center, providing computer services to university faculty, staff and students, is established.
1990	The Information Science Course in the Faculty of Education is established. The Department of Information Processing and Management in the Faculty of Economics is established in accordance with the reorganization of the Faculty.
1991	The Graduate School of Education is established, and grants degrees in School Education, Special Education and Subject Studies (Japanese, Social Studies, Natural Science, Art, and English.) The post-graduate course in Pedagogy is abolished. The Department of Finance in the Faculty of Economics is established. The Computer Center is renamed the Center for Information Processing.
1992	The Center for Teacher In-Service Training in the Faculty of Education is estab-lished.
1993	In accordance with the National School Establishment Law, the Junior College of Economics is abolished in March, 1996. At the same time, the Faculty of Economics established a Course for Workers in the Evening program. Then, the Departments of Management and Accounting in the Faculty of Economics are reorganized and renamed the Department of Business Administration and the Department of Accounting. The Department of Social Systems in the Faculty of Economics is established. Also, the Joint Research Center in the Faculty of Economics is established.
1994	In accordance with the National School Establishment Law, the Research Center for Lifelong Learning is established.
1995	The Research Institute for Lake Science is reorganized and renamed the Center for Environmental Education and Lake Science.
1997	The Faculty of Education is reorganized. The following courses are abolished: Junior High School Teachers, Special Education Teachers, and Kindergarten Teachers, and they are reorganized as Department of Education.
1999	Education of the Mentally Handicapped in the Certificate Course in Special Education is renamed Education of the Mentally Retarded.
2000	The Faculty of Education is reorganized. The Department of Information Science is reorganized and renamed the Department of Information Sciences and Education. The Department of Environmental Education is newly established. The Faculty of Education now consists of three Departments: the Department of Education, the Department of Information Science and Education and the Department of Environmental Education. The Center for Teacher In-Service Training in the Faculty of Education is reorgan-ized and renamed Center for Educational Research and Practice. 2000 The branch library of the Faculty of Economics is abolished. 2001 The Joint Research Center has changed to the ministerial ordinance facilities.
2001	The Global Finance Course in the Graduate School of Economics is instituted.
2001	The International Students Center is established.
2002	The Center for Community Partnership is established.
2003	The Research Center for Sustainability and Environment is established. A 'Risk Research in Economics and Management' curriculum is established as a doctoral program, the first of its kind among social science programs in Japan.
2004	Center for Risk Research is established.
2006	International Students Center is reorganized and renamed Shiga University International (SUI).
2012	Research Center for Cooperation with Society is established amalgamating the Research Center for Lifelong Learning, the Joint Research Center and the Center for Community Partnership.
2019	The Faculty and Graduate School of Data Science are established.

== As a base university selected by MEXT ==
Shiga University together with Hokkaido University, University of Tokyo, Kyoto University, Osaka University and kyushu University is one of the 6 base universities for education of applied mathematics and data science selected by MEXT (Ministry of Education, Culture, Sports, Science and Technology).

== Student activities ==
Shiga University offers a wide variety of clubs and circles.

Further information : Extracurricular activities (clubs and circles)

=== SIFE National Champion & World Cup semifinalist ===
In 2010, Shiga University team of Students in Free Enterprise (SIFE), which won twice in Japan in 2007 and 2010 by beating Kyoto University, Waseda University, Keio University and so on, became the first-ever Japanese semifinalist of SIFE World Cup.

== Evaluation from Business World ==
The university ranking according to the ratio of "president and chief executive officer of listed company in Japan"
	Ranking
all universities in Japan	9th out of all the 744 universities which existed as of 2006
Source	2006 Survey by Weekly Diamond 〈ja〉 on the ranking of the universities which produced the high ratio of the graduates who hold the position of "president, representative director or chief executive officer of listed company" to all the graduates of each university

The university ranking according to the ratio of the number of the officers & managers produced by each university to the number of graduates
	Ranking
all universities in Japan	4th out of all the 778 universities which existed as of 2010
Source	2010 Survey by Weekly Economist 〈ja〉 on the ranking of universities according to the ratio of the number of the officers & managers produced by each university to the number of graduates

The university ranking according to the order of the evaluation by Personnel Departments of Leading Companies in Japan
	Ranking
Kinki region	5th (out of 156 universities which existed in Kinki region as of 2020)
Japan	20th (out of 781 universities in Japan as of 2020)
As for interpersonal power of students	9th (out of 781 universities in Japan as of 2020)
Source	2020 Nikkei Survey to all listed (3,714) and leading unlisted (1,100), totally 4,814 companies

== Notable people ==
- Yoshiji Fukushima, businessperson
- Hirotaro Higuchi, businessperson
- Kakuzo Kawamoto, businessperson and politician
- Gentaro Kawase, businessperson
- Koji Kobayashi, businessperson
- Masahiro Murakami, businessperson
- Shoji Nishida, politician
- Yoshiomi Tamai, activist, philanthropist and educator
- Sōsuke Uno, prime minister
- Mohammad Shorif Uddin, Vice-Chancellor of Green University of Bangladesh.
