= Kanagawa 4th district =

- Parliamentary constituency for the Japanese House of Representatives
- Numbered map of the Kanagawa Prefecture single seats in Yokohama
- Prefecture: Kanagawa
- Proportional District: Southern Kanto
- Electorate: 331,515

Current constituency
- Created: 1994
- Seats: One
- Party: LDP
- Representatives: Marina Nagata
- Municipalities: Sakae-ku of Yokohama, Cities of Kamakura and Zushi, Districts of Miura

Kanagawa 4th district (神奈川県第4区, Kanagawa-ken dai-yonku or simply 神奈川4区, Kanagawa-yonku) is a single-member constituency of the House of Representatives in the national Diet of Japan located in Kanagawa Prefecture.

== Areas covered ==
=== Since 1994 ===
- Yokohama city
  - Sakae-ku
- Kamakura
- Zushi
- Miura District

== List of representatives ==
Election	Representative	Party	Notes
1996	Tadayoshi Iijima	LDP	
2000	Hisako Ōishi	Democratic	
2003	Hisako Ōishi	Democratic	
2005	Jun Hayashi	LDP	
2009	Kazuyoshi Nagashima	Democratic	
2012	Keiichiro Asao	Your	
2014	Keiichiro Asao	Independent	
2017	Yuki Waseda	CDP	
2021	Yuki Waseda	CDP	
2024	Yuki Waseda	CDP	
2026	Yuki Waseda	CRA	

== Election results ==
=== 2026 ===
2026
Party	Candidate	Votes	%	±%
LDP	Marina Nagata	93,954	47.6	▲24.2
Centrist Reform	Yuki Waseda (Incumbent) (Won a seat in the PR Block)	82,939	42.0	▼9.5
Sanseitō	Reichirō Tamiya	20,655	10.5	▲3.7
Majority		11,015	5.6	▼22.48
Registered electors		328,186		
Turnout			61.83	▲2.71
LDP gain from Centrist Reform				

=== 2024 ===
2024
Party	Candidate	Votes	%	±%
CDP	Yuki Waseda (Incumbent)	96,874	51.47	▲18.44
LDP	Tomohiro Yamamoto	44,016	23.39	▼0.09
Ishin	Chika Kato	34,625	18.40	▲10.22
Sanseitō	Teruhisa Tsuno	12,704	6.74	New
Majority		52,858	28.08	
Registered electors		330,487		
Turnout			59.12	▼2.58
CDP hold				

=== 2021 ===
2021
Party	Candidate	Votes	%	±%
CDP	Yuki Waseda (Incumbent)	66,841	33.03	New
Independent	Keiichiro Asao	63,687	31.47	▲4.77
LDP	Tomohiro Yamamoto (Won PR seat)	47,511	23.48	▼5.41
Ishin	Akihiko Takaya	16,559	8.18	New
Independent	Tsuneki Ōnishi	7,790	3.84	New
Majority		3,154	1.56	
Registered electors		332,708		
Turnout			61.70	▲2.66
CDP hold				

=== 2017 ===
2017
Party	Candidate	Votes	%	±%
CDP	Yuki Waseda	67,020	34.76	New
LDP	Tomohiro Yamamoto (Won PR seat)	55,700	28.89	▼3.60
Independent	Keiichiro Asao (Incumbent)	51,495	26.70	▼21.42
Kibō no Tō	Noriko Kazama	18,618	9.65	New
Majority		11,320	5.87	
Registered electors		332,192		
Turnout			59.04	▼0.07
CDP gain from Independent				

=== 2014 ===
2014
Party	Candidate	Votes	%	±%
Independent	Keiichiro Asao (Incumbent)	91,063	48.12	New
LDP	Tomohiro Yamamoto (Won PR seat)	61,479	32.49	▲4.65
JCP	Katsuhiro Kato	20,063	10.60	▲3.12
Independent	Takahiro Ogiwara	16,633	8.79	New
Majority		29,584	15.63	
Registered electors		327,687		
Turnout			59.17	▼5.25
Independent hold				

=== 2012 ===
2012
Party	Candidate	Votes	%	±%
Your	Keiichiro Asao	100,632	48.70	▲18.55
LDP	Tomohiro Yamamoto (Won PR seat)	57,542	27.84	▲0.56
Democratic	Takahiro Ogiwara	33,022	15.98	▼21.99
JCP	Katsuhiro Kato	15,456	7.48	N/A
Majority		43,090	20.86	
Registered electors				
Turnout			64.42	▲7.82
Your gain from Democratic				

=== 2009 ===
2009
Party	Candidate	Votes	%	±%
Democratic	Kazuyoshi Nagashima	89,082	37.97	▲3.57
Your	Keiichiro Asao (Won PR seat)	70,728	30.15	New
LDP	Jun Hayashi (Incumbent)	64,006	27.28	▼25.26
Independent	Kohei Ito	7,270	3.10	New
Happiness Realization	Mari Obara	3,505	1.50	New
Majority		18,354	7.82	
Registered electors				
Turnout			72.24	
Democratic gain from LDP				

=== 2005 ===
2005
Party	Candidate	Votes	%	±%
LDP	Jun Hayashi	119,618	52.54	▲13.65
Democratic	Hisako Ōishi (Incumbent)	78,326	34.40	▼12.48
NP-Nippon	Yoshihiro Takano	15,961	7.01	New
JCP	Nobuaki Hayashi	13,774	6.05	▼1.00
Majority		41,292	18.14	
Registered electors				
Turnout				
LDP gain from Democratic				

=== 2003 ===
2003
Party	Candidate	Votes	%	±%
Democratic	Hisako Ōishi (Incumbent)	89,515	46.88	▲9.23
LDP	Jun Hayashi	74,267	38.89	▲12.19
Independent	Tatsuharu Mawatari	13,706	7.18	New
JCP	Nobuaki Hayashi	13,473	7.05	▼3.19
Majority		15,248	7.99	
Registered electors				
Turnout				
Democratic hold				

=== 2000 ===
2000
Party	Candidate	Votes	%	±%
Democratic	Hisako Ōishi	73,979	37.65	New
LDP	Tadayoshi Iijima (Incumbent)	52,468	26.70	▲1.61
Liberal League	Yoshihiro Takano	36,528	18.59	▲8.07
JCP	Yoshihiko Tanaka	20,127	10.24	▼1.49
Independent	Fumihiko Sakai	8,969	4.56	New
Independent	Masatoshi Kawakami	2,549	1.30	New
Independent	Kazuya Atsumi	1,896	0.96	New
Majority		21,511	10.95	
Registered electors				
Turnout				
Democratic gain from LDP				

=== 1996 ===
1996
Party	Candidate	Votes	%	±%
LDP	Tadayoshi Iijima	46,389	25.09	New
New Frontier	Keiichiro Asao	38,725	20.95	New
Democratic	Akio Nakajima	29,967	16.21	New
Independent	Kazuyoshi Nagashima	28,656	15.50	New
JCP	Yasuko Utsunomiya	21,681	11.73	New
Liberal League	Yoshihiro Takano	19,464	10.52	New
Majority		7,664	4.14	
Registered electors				
Turnout				
LDP win (new seat)				
