= Kanagawa 3rd district (1947–1993) =

Former multi-member constituency of the Japanese House of Representatives

Kanagawa 3rd district (Japanese: 神奈川県第3区, romanized: Kanagawa-ken dai-san-ku) was a multi-member constituency of the House of Representatives in the National Diet of Japan. It existed from the 1947 Japanese general election until the electoral reform of 1994 and was used in general elections from 1947 to 1993.

== Area ==
The modern single-member districts that cover the former area are Kanagawa 12th district, Kanagawa 13th district, Kanagawa 14th district, Kanagawa 15th district, Kanagawa 16th district and Kanagawa 20th district. It has no relation to the current Kanagawa 3rd district.

=== 1992 boundaries (5 seats) ===
At the time of the 1992 amendment to the Public Offices Election Act the district consisted of the following areas (5 seats):

- Fujisawa
- Chigasaki
- Sagamihara
- Yamato
- Ebina
- Zama
- Ayase
- Kōza District
- Tsukui District

=== 1986 boundaries (4 seats) ===
At the time of the 1986 amendment to the Public Offices Election Act the district consisted of the following areas (4 seats):

- Fujisawa
- Chigasaki
- Sagamihara
- Yamato
- Ebina
- Zama
- Ayase
- Kōza District
- Tsukui District

=== 1975 boundaries (3 seats) ===
At the time of the 1975 amendment to the Public Offices Election Act the district consisted of the following areas (3 seats):

- Fujisawa
- Chigasaki
- Sagamihara
- Yamato
- Ebina
- Zama
- Kōza District
- Tsukui District

=== 1950 boundaries (5 seats) ===
At the time of the enactment of the Public Offices Election Act in 1950 the district consisted of the following areas (5 seats):

- Hiratsuka
- Fujisawa
- Odawara
- Chigasaki
- Kōza District
- Naka District
- Ashigarakami District
- Ashigarashimo District
- Aikō District
- Tsukui District

== History ==
=== Until 1972 (pre-split) ===
Created in 1947 with the reintroduction of the multi-member system, the district originally covered a vast area from the Shōnan and central Kanagawa regions to the western Ashigara districts (including Odawara, Hakone and the Tanzawa mountains) and the northern Aikō and Tsukui districts. It elected five members.

The powerful Kōno family (based in the western Odawara area) — Ichirō Kōno, Kenzō Kōno and later Yōhei Kōno — dominated the district for decades. They competed with long-serving figures such as former Prime Minister Tetsu Katayama (Socialist, based in Fujisawa) and long-time Vice-Speaker Nobuyuki Iwamoto (based in Sagamihara).

In the first election (1947), Ichirō Kōno was still purged and could not run; his younger brother Kenzō finished just outside the winners. Kenzō won in 1949 and later moved to the House of Councillors. Ichirō returned in 1952 and held the seat until his death in 1965. Katayama topped the poll in 1947 but lost in 1949 amid the collapse of his coalition government; he returned in 1952 but was defeated for a second time in 1963 (as a Democratic Socialist) and retired — the only former prime minister to suffer two electoral defeats under the postwar constitution until that time.

After the retirements of Ichirō Kōno and Katayama, the 1967 election saw Yōhei Kōno (Ichirō’s second son) and Masaru Kawamura (Democratic Socialist, Katayama’s successor) take the top two places. From then until 1972 the four main incumbents (Yōhei Kōno, Takeshi Hirabayashi, Kawamura and Shinji Kohama of Kōmeitō) largely held their seats, with the fifth seat contested.

=== 1975–1993 (post-split) ===
In July 1975 the district was split. The southwestern portion (Odawara, Hiratsuka, Atsugi, etc.) became the new Kanagawa 5th district. The remaining Kanagawa 3rd district covered central and northwestern areas (Fujisawa, Chigasaki, Yamato, Sagamihara, Zama, etc.) and was reduced to three seats (raised to four in 1986 and five in 1993).

In the first post-split election (1976), Yōhei Kōno, Hirabayashi and Kawamura moved to the new 5th district. The 3rd district was contested by Shinji Kohama (Kōmeitō), Kazuhiko Masumoto (Communist), Mankichi Katō (Socialist, Chigasaki base) and Tadashi Amari (originally LDP, then New Liberal Club). Tadashi Amari topped the poll for the New Liberal Club; the LDP’s Masakata Tozawa took the second conservative seat and Katō returned for the Socialists. The Communists never regained a seat in the district after 1972.

Subsequent elections saw intense three- and four-seat contests, with seats frequently changing hands between the LDP/New Liberal Club, Socialists and Kōmeitō. In 1983 Tadashi Amari retired and was succeeded by his son Akira Amari (New Liberal Club, later LDP). Fumihiko Hashimoto (Kōmeitō) and later Nobuo Kawakami held the Kōmeitō seat. Hirohisa Fujii entered the Diet from this district in 1990 (LDP) and topped the poll in 1993 as a member of the Japan Renewal Party.

In the final multi-member election (1993) the district elected five members: Fujii (Japan Renewal Party), Akira Amari (LDP), Kawakami (Kōmeitō), Katō (Socialist) and Akio Nakajima (Japan New Party).

After the 1994 electoral reform the area was divided into single-member districts. Akira Amari moved to the new Kanagawa 13th district, Fujii to Kanagawa 14th district, etc.

== Elected members ==
Election	Year	1st	2nd	3rd	4th	5th
23rd	1947	Tetsu Katayama (JSP)	Yūji Suzuki (JSP)	Hisao Hagiwara (National Cooperative)	Nobuyuki Iwamoto (Japan Liberal)	Teijo Isozaki (Japan Liberal)
24th	1949	Katsuo Okazaki (Democratic Liberal)	Nobuyuki Iwamoto (Democratic Liberal)	Yoshiteru Kogane (Independent)	Kenzō Kōno (Democratic Liberal)	Inosuke Nakanishi (JCP)
25th	1952	Tetsu Katayama (Rightist Socialist)	Ichirō Kōno (Liberal)	Yoshiteru Kogane (Liberal)	Nobuyuki Iwamoto (Liberal)	Katsuo Okazaki (Liberal)
26th	1953	Tetsu Katayama (Rightist Socialist)	Satoru Andō (Liberal Separatists)	Ichirō Kōno (Liberal Separatists)	Katsuo Okazaki (Liberal)	Yoshiteru Kogane (Liberal)
27th	1955	Ichirō Kōno (Japan Democratic)	Tetsu Katayama (Rightist Socialist)	Morito Morishima (Leftist Socialist)	Satoru Andō (Japan Democratic)	Yoshiteru Kogane (Liberal)
28th	1958	Morito Morishima (JSP)	Ichirō Kōno (LDP)	Nobuyuki Iwamoto (LDP)	Tetsu Katayama (JSP)	Yoshiteru Kogane (LDP)
29th	1960	Morito Morishima (JSP)	Ichirō Kōno (LDP)	Yoshiteru Kogane (LDP)	Satoru Andō (LDP)	Tetsu Katayama (DSP)
30th	1963	Ichirō Kōno (LDP)	Takeshi Hirabayashi (JSP)	Satoru Andō (LDP)	Gōsuke Kimura (LDP)	Yoshiteru Kogane (LDP)
31st	1967	Yōhei Kōno (LDP)	Masaru Kawamura (DSP)	Mankichi Katō (JSP)	Takeshi Hirabayashi (JSP)	Shinji Kohama (Kōmeitō)
32nd	1969	Yōhei Kōno (LDP)	Shinji Kohama (Kōmeitō)	Masaru Kawamura (DSP)	Yoshiteru Kogane (LDP)	Takeshi Hirabayashi (JSP)
33rd	1972	Yōhei Kōno (LDP)	Shinji Kohama (Kōmeitō)	Kazuhiko Masumoto (JCP)	Takeshi Hirabayashi (JSP)	Masaru Kawamura (DSP)
34th	1976	Tadashi Amari (New Liberal Club)	Mankichi Katō (JSP)	Masakata Tozawa (LDP)		
35th	1979	Shinji Kohama (Kōmeitō)	Mankichi Katō (JSP)	Masakata Tozawa (LDP)		
36th	1980	Masakata Tozawa (LDP)	Mankichi Katō (JSP)	Tadashi Amari (New Liberal Club)		
37th	1983	Fumihiko Hashimoto (Kōmeitō)	Mankichi Katō (JSP)	Akira Amari (New Liberal Club)		
38th	1986	Fumihiko Hashimoto (Kōmeitō)	Mankichi Katō (JSP)	Akira Amari (New Liberal Club)	Masakata Tozawa (LDP)	
39th	1990	Mankichi Katō (JSP)	Nobuo Kawakami (Kōmeitō)	Akira Amari (LDP)	Hirohisa Fujii (LDP)	
40th	1993	Hirohisa Fujii (Japan Renewal Party)	Akira Amari (LDP)	Nobuo Kawakami (Kōmeitō)	Mankichi Katō (JSP)	Akio Nakajima (Japan New Party)

== Election results ==
=== 1993 (40th general election) ===
Rank	Candidate	Age	Party	Status	Votes
1	Hirohisa Fujii	61	Japan Renewal Party	Incumbent	132,236
2	Akira Amari	43	LDP	Incumbent	129,149
3	Nobuo Kawakami	47	Kō meitō	Incumbent	105,823
4	Mankichi Katō	66	JSP	Incumbent	101,879
5	Akio Nakajima	57	Japan New Party	New	100,032
6	Mitsuhiro Yokota	35	New Party Sakigake	New	94,084
7	Kōji Kōno	47	JCP	New	46,343
8	Shigeyuki Kadohiro	42	LDP	New	41,791
9	Hisako Fujimura	49	Independent	New	41,431

=== 1990 (39th general election) ===
Rank	Candidate	Age	Party	Status	Votes
1	Mankichi Katō	63	JSP	Incumbent	241,995
2	Nobuo Kawakami	43	Kōmeitō	New	137,147
3	Akira Amari	40	LDP	Incumbent	124,931
4	Hirohisa Fujii	57	LDP	New	113,661
5	Masakata Tozawa	70	LDP	Incumbent	106,512
6	Kōji Kōno	44	JCP	New	64,612
7	Tomomasa Nakagawa	27	Truth Party	New	1,445

=== 1986 (38th general election) ===
Rank	Candidate	Age	Party	Status	Votes
1	Fumihiko Hashimoto	47	Kōmeitō	Incumbent	140,930
2	Mankichi Katō	59	JSP	Incumbent	136,369
3	Akira Amari	36	New Liberal Club	Incumbent	125,563
4	Masakata Tozawa	67	LDP	Former	121,846
5	Hirohisa Fujii	54	LDP	New	95,331
6	Kōji Kōno	40	JCP	New	56,971

=== 1983 (37th general election) ===
Rank	Candidate	Age	Party	Status	Votes
1	Fumihiko Hashimoto	44	Kōmeitō	New	147,500
2	Mankichi Katō	57	JSP	Incumbent	130,501
3	Akira Amari	34	New Liberal Club	New	125,939
4	Masakata Tozawa	64	LDP	Incumbent	124,766
5	Kazuhiko Masumoto	47	JCP	Former	71,463
6	Kyūshūo Shigematsu	71	Japan Yonaoshi Party	New	1,968

=== 1980 (36th general election) ===
Rank	Candidate	Age	Party	Status	Votes
1	Masakata Tozawa	61	LDP	Incumbent	162,054
2	Mankichi Katō	53	JSP	Incumbent	131,889
3	Tadashi Amari	63	New Liberal Club	Former	128,587
4	Shinji Kohama	65	Kōmeitō	Incumbent	128,067
5	Kazuhiko Masumoto	44	JCP	Former	83,793
6	Shō Tōma	36	Japan Labor Party	New	4,460

=== 1979 (35th general election) ===
Rank	Candidate	Age	Party	Status	Votes
1	Shinji Kohama	64	Kōmeitō	Former	123,389
2	Mankichi Katō	52	JSP	Incumbent	110,137
3	Masakata Tozawa	60	LDP	New	100,682
4	Tadashi Amari	62	New Liberal Club	Incumbent	99,936
5	Kazuhiko Masumoto	43	JCP	Former	73,433
6	Shō Tōma	36	Japan Labor Party	New	2,965

=== 1976 (34th general election) ===
Rank	Candidate	Age	Party	Status	Votes
1	Tadashi Amari	60	New Liberal Club	New	162,029
2	Mankichi Katō	49	JSP	Former	112,209
3	Masakata Tozawa	57	LDP	New	110,585
4	Shinji Kohama	61	Kōmeitō	Incumbent	108,182
5	Kazuhiko Masumoto	40	JCP	Incumbent	82,525
6	Kyūshūo Shigematsu	64	Independent	New	1,573
7	Kiyotoku Fukuda	43	Independent	New	1,077

=== 1972 (33rd general election) ===
Rank	Candidate	Age	Party	Status	Votes
1	Yōhei Kōno	35	LDP	Incumbent	141,448
2	Shinji Kohama	57	Kōmeitō	Incumbent	112,297
3	Kazuhiko Masumoto	36	JCP	New	107,245
4	Takeshi Hirabayashi	51	JSP	Incumbent	99,440
5	Masaru Kawamura	57	DSP	Incumbent	97,436
6	Tadashi Amari	56	LDP	New	96,592
7	Mankichi Katō	45	JSP	Former	93,504
8	Yoshiteru Kogane	74	LDP	Incumbent	79,624
9	Makoto Yamada	27	Independent	New	11,403

=== 1969 (32nd general election) ===
Rank	Candidate	Age	Party	Status	Votes
1	Yōhei Kō no	32	LDP	Incumbent	100,216
2	Shinji Kohama	54	Kōmeitō	Incumbent	99,341
3	Masaru Kawamura	54	DSP	Incumbent	94,558
4	Yoshiteru Kogane	71	LDP	Former	92,466
5	Takeshi Hirabayashi	48	JSP	Incumbent	79,859
6	Tadashi Amari	53	LDP	New	68,020
7	Mankichi Katō	43	JSP	Incumbent	66,321
8	Kazuhiko Masumoto	33	JCP	New	42,577
9	Tetsu Andō	40	Independent	New	25,138
10	Kōzō Ōtsuka	45	Independent	New	4,973

=== 1967 (31st general election) ===
Rank	Candidate	Age	Party	Status	Votes
1	Yōhei Kōno	30	LDP	New	106,827
2	Masaru Kawamura	51	DSP	New	91,123
3	Mankichi Katō	40	JSP	New	77,806
4	Takeshi Hirabayashi	45	JSP	Incumbent	71,493
5	Shinji Kohama	51	Kōmeitō	New	68,516
6	Satoru Andō	67	LDP	Incumbent	67,336
7	Yoshiteru Kogane	68	LDP	Incumbent	60,992
8	Gōsuke Kimura	49	LDP	Incumbent	52,792
9	Takechiyo Uchino	65	JCP	New	22,834

=== 1963 (30th general election) ===
Rank	Candidate	Age	Party	Status	Votes
1	Ichirō Kōno	65	LDP	Incumbent	98,830
2	Takeshi Hirabayashi	42	JSP	New	61,765
3	Satoru Andō	64	LDP	Incumbent	57,215
4	Gōsuke Kimura	45	LDP	New	53,370
5	Yoshiteru Kogane	65	LDP	Incumbent	52,275
6	Tetsu Katayama	76	DSP	Incumbent	51,525
7	Morito Morishima	67	JSP	Incumbent	44,506
8	Isamu Togawa	39	Independent	New	19,871
9	Hideo Kanezō	50	Independent	New	19,540
10	Takechiyo Uchino	62	JCP	New	13,652
11	Seijirō Fukasaku	52	Parliamentary Democracy Defense League	New	230

=== 1960 (29th general election) ===
Rank	Candidate	Age	Party	Status	Votes
1	Morito Morishima	64	JSP	Incumbent	76,255
2	Ichirō Kōno	62	LDP	Incumbent	66,515
3	Yoshiteru Kogane	62	LDP	Incumbent	58,272
4	Satoru Andō	61	LDP	Former	56,738
5	Tetsu Katayama	73	DSP	Incumbent	48,541
6	Nobuyuki Iwamoto	65	LDP	Incumbent	48,274
7	Gōsuke Kimura	42	LDP	New	47,886
8	Takechiyo Uchino	59	JCP	New	11,281
9	Kōmei Kōno	55	Independent	New	677

=== 1958 (28th general election) ===
Rank	Candidate	Age	Party	Status	Votes
1	Morito Morishima	62	JSP	Incumbent	64,676
2	Ichirō Kōno	59	LDP	Incumbent	63,265
3	Nobuyuki Iwamoto	63	LDP	Former	62,699
4	Tetsu Katayama	70	JSP	Incumbent	60,589
5	Yoshiteru Kogane	60	LDP	Incumbent	58,751
6	Satoru Andō	58	LDP	Incumbent	49,732
7	Gōsuke Kimura	40	Independent (conservative)	New	43,391
8	Takechiyo Uchino	56	JCP	New	9,793

=== 1955 (27th general election) ===
Rank	Candidate	Age	Party	Status	Votes
1	Ichirō Kōno	56	Japan Democratic	Incumbent	69,433
2	Tetsu Katayama	67	Rightist Socialist	Incumbent	58,923
3	Morito Morishima	58	Leftist Socialist	New	45,784
4	Satoru Andō	55	Japan Democratic	Incumbent	43,998
5	Yoshiteru Kogane	56	Liberal	Incumbent	42,156
6	Nobuyuki Iwamoto	59	Liberal	Former	39,299
7	Kengichi Satō	57	Japan Democratic	New	38,815
8	Katsuo Okazaki	57	Liberal	Incumbent	32,323
9	Kan'ichirō Kamei	62	Rightist Socialist	Former	16,496

=== 1953 (26th general election) ===
Rank	Candidate	Age	Party	Status	Votes
1	Tetsu Katayama	65	Rightist Socialist	Incumbent	81,402
2	Satoru Andō	53	Liberal Separatists	Former	51,180
3	Ichirō Kōno	54	Liberal Separatists	Incumbent	47,774
4	Katsuo Okazaki	55	Liberal	Incumbent	46,454
5	Yoshiteru Kogane	55	Liberal	Incumbent	42,492
6	Nobuyuki Iwamoto	58	Liberal	Incumbent	37,034
7	Morito Morishima	57	Leftist Socialist	New	26,601
8	Takechiyo Uchino	51	JCP	New	7,332
9	Minoru Sakata	48	Progressive	New	3,037
10	Kiichi Gotō	53	Independent	New	1,911

=== 1952 (25th general election) ===
Rank	Candidate	Age	Party	Status	Votes
1	Tetsu Katayama	65	Rightist Socialist	Former	102,838
2	Ichirō Kōno	54	Liberal	Former	57,580
3	Yoshiteru Kogane	54	Liberal	Incumbent	49,445
4	Nobuyuki Iwamoto	57	Liberal	Incumbent	40,038
5	Katsuo Okazaki	55	Liberal	Incumbent	36,837
6	Kengichi Satō	55	Liberal	New	35,054
7	Satoru Andō	53	Independent	Former	32,241
8	Takechiyo Uchino	51	JCP	New	9,954
9	Minoru Sakata	47	Progressive	New	1,929

=== 1949 (24th general election) ===
Rank	Candidate	Age	Party	Status	Votes
1	Katsuo Okazaki	51	Democratic Liberal	New	43,818
2	Nobuyuki Iwamoto	53	Democratic Liberal	Incumbent	39,540
3	Yoshiteru Kogane	50	Independent (conservative)	New	33,788
4	Kenzō Kōno	47	Democratic Liberal	New	33,673
5	Inosuke Nakanishi	61	JCP	Former	31,491
6	Tetsu Katayama	61	JSP	Incumbent	31,214
7	Yūji Suzuki	39	JSP	Incumbent	28,605
8	Kengichi Satō	51	Democratic Liberal	New	26,553
9	Yoshinobu Soeda	48	Independent	New	22,233
10	Hisao Hagiwara	52	National Cooperative	Incumbent	17,169
11	Ichirō Kanezō	44	Democratic	New	8,995
12	Tōichi Fuse	36	Workers and Farmers	New	3,335
13	Kamisūzō Ueki	72	Independent	New	916

=== 1947 (23rd general election) ===
Rank	Candidate	Age	Party	Status	Votes
1	Tetsu Katayama	59	JSP	Incumbent	55,515
2	Yūji Suzuki	38	JSP	New	48,421
3	Hisao Hagiwara	51	National Cooperative	New	42,517
4	Nobuyuki Iwamoto	52	Japan Liberal	Incumbent	34,161
5	Teijo Isozaki	57	Japan Liberal	Incumbent	21,872
6	Kenzō Kōno	45	Japan Liberal	New	18,716
7	Kinki Kobayashi	62	Democratic	New	18,451
8	Ichirō Kanezō	43	Democratic	New	11,135
9	Inosuke Nakanishi	60	JCP	Incumbent	9,061
10	Jozo Ōmori	46	Democratic People’s League	New	4,704
11	Bunsaku Hagiwara	59	Independent Farmers	New	2,370
12	Chizuko Mori	37	Independent	New	2,163
13	Shūzō Wada	47	Independent	New	1,792
14	Kamisūzō Ueki	45	Autonomy Party	New	1,027
15	Denzaburō Inoue	58	Independent	New	1,018

== See also ==
- Kanagawa 12th district
- Kanagawa 13th district
- Kanagawa 14th district
- Kanagawa 15th district
- Kanagawa 16th district
