= Kyoto Institute of Technology =

University in Kyoto, Japan

Coordinates: 35°01′27″N 135°43′29″E

- 京都工芸繊維大学
- Type: Public (national)
- Established: Founded 1949, Chartered 1899
- Location: Kyoto, Kyoto, Japan
- Nickname: Kosen
- Website: www.kit.ac.jp

Kyoto Institute of Technology (Japanese: 京都工芸繊維大学, Hepburn: Kyōto Kōgei Sen'i Daigaku) is a national university established in 1949 in Kyoto, Japan.

The Institute's history extends back to two schools, Kyoto Craft High School (established in 1902 at Sakyo-ku, Yoshida) and Kyoto Sericulture Training School (established in 1899 at Kita-ku, Daishogun, under the jurisdiction of the Ministry of Agriculture and Commerce), which were forerunners of the Faculty of Engineering and Design and the Faculty of Textile Science, respectively. The former was moved to Sakyo-ku, Matsugasaki in 1930 and changed its name to Kyoto Industrial High School in 1944. The latter developed into Kyoto Sericulture High School, under supervision of the Ministry of Education in 1914, and changed its name to Kyoto Sericulture Technical High School in 1931 and then to Kyoto Technical High School of Sericulture in 1944. The two forerunners merged in 1949, due to educational system revisions, to establish the present School of Science and Technology. Together with Shinshu University and Tokyo University of Agriculture and Technology, the Institute is one of Japan's three historical centers of textile research.

Kyoto Institute of Technology has a campus at Matsugasaki in Sakyō-ku. Another campus is at Saga in Ukyō-ku. Its Japanese nickname is Kōsen (工繊). In English it is known as KIT.

Beginning in October 2007, graduate course instruction became available in English through the International Program for Science and Technology for specially selected students from the 50 institutions worldwide with KIT Exchange Agreements.

== Statistics ==
3954 undergraduates (29% women) and 1110 graduate students (23% women), 170 of whom are international students from 30 countries, comprised the student body as of May 1, 2011. From 2008 to 2009, 330 KIT researchers traveled abroad and 175 researchers came to KIT from abroad.

== Programs ==
=== Undergraduate programs ===
- Applied Biology
- Biomolecular Engineering
- Macromolecular Science and Engineering
- Chemistry and Materials Technology
- Electronics
- Information Science
- Mechanical and System Engineering
- Design Engineering and Management
- Architecture and Design
- Integrated Science and Technology (evening programs in Bioscience, Nanomaterial Science, Mechatronics Technology, and Information Design Technology)

The university graduate school, established in 1988, awards master's and doctoral degrees in science and technology.

=== Master's programs ===
- Applied Biology
- Biomolecular Engineering
- Macromolecular Science and Engineering
- Chemistry and Materials Technology
- Electronics
- Information Science
- Mechanical and Systems Engineering
- Design Engineering and Management
- Architecture and Design
- Design
- Architectural Engineering
- Advanced Fibro-Science

=== Doctoral programs ===
- Materials and Life Science
- Engineering Design
- Design Science
- Advanced Fibro-Science
- Biobased Materials Science

== Centers and campus facilities ==
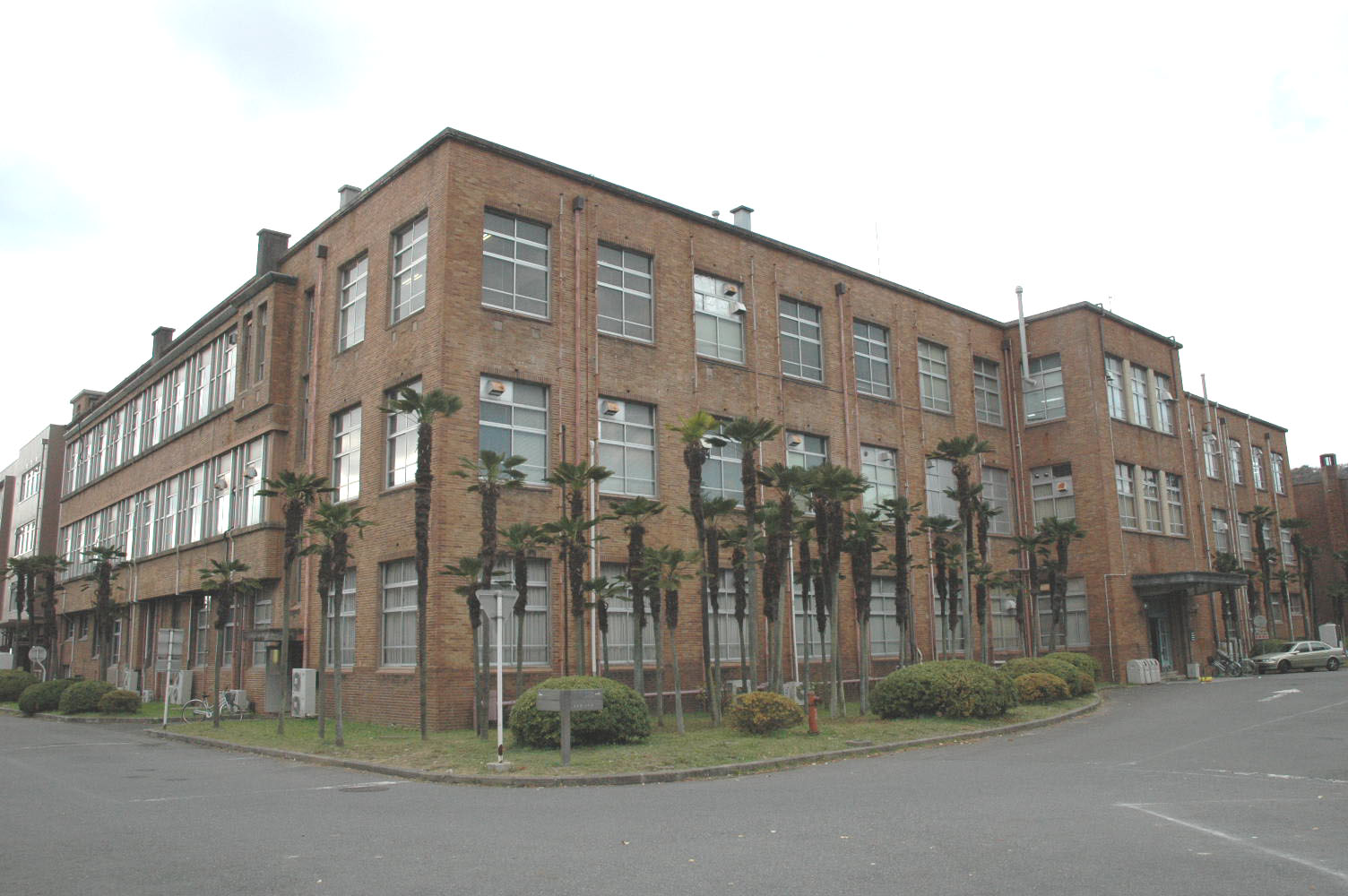
The Building No.3 built in 1930

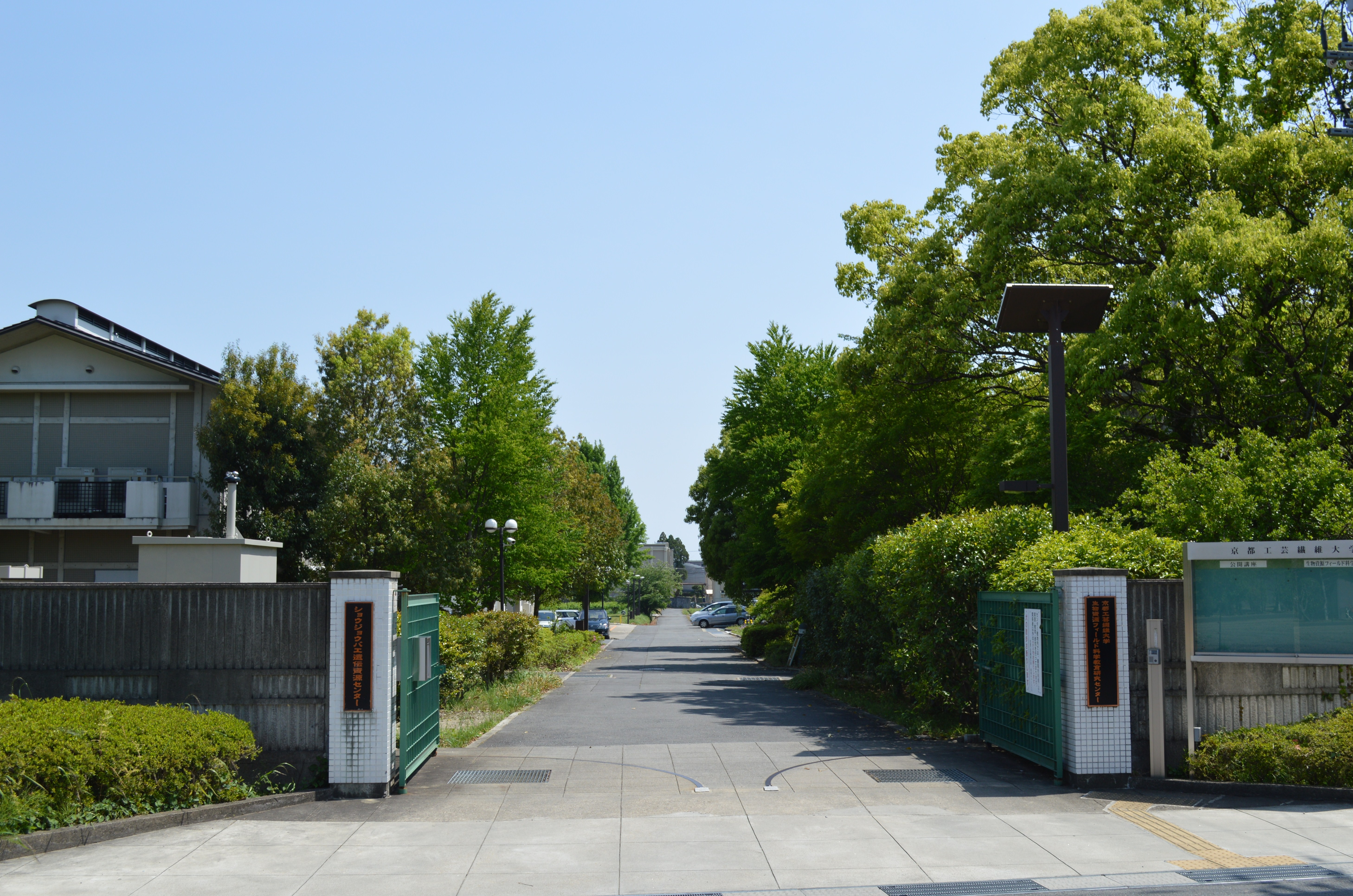
Saga Campus (Center for Bioresource Field Science)

- Cooperative Research Center
- Drosophila Genetic Resource Center
- Center for Instrumental Analysis
- Center for Environmental Science
- Center for Information Science
- Radioisotope Laboratory
- Venture Laboratory
- Incubation Center
- Center for Fiber and Textile Science
- Center for Bioresource Field Science
- Center for Manufacturing Technology
- International Exchange Center
- Health Care Service Center
- Center Hall
- University Library
- Museum and Archives
- Sustainable Design Education Research Center

In 2006, 28 patents were attributed to Kyoto Institute of Technology.

== Notable KIT graduates and professors ==
- Asai Chu (1856–1907), Artist
- Motono, Seigo (1882–1944) (architect, professor)
- Sei-ichi (1905–1983) Architect, KIT graduate
- Kimura, Kosuke (professor emeritus, former president)
- Nakamura, Masao (professor emeritus, architect and researcher of tea houses and sukiya-style construction)
- Takeda, Goichi 1872–1938
- Yoshitake, Touri 1886–1945 (alumni and architect, designer of the Diet Yokohama Customs Buildings)
- Matsukuma, Hiroshi (History and Philosophy of Architecture, Public Space Planner)
- Jinnai, Hiroshi (professor),
- Kishi, Waro (born 1950, professor emeritus, architect)
- Kimura, Hiroaki (born 1952, professor, architect)
- Kojima, Kazuhiro (1958 – professor, architect)
- Yoneda, Akira (born 1959, professor, architect)
- Kidosaki, Nagisa (born 1960, professor, architect)
- Nagasaka, Dai (born 1960, professor, architect)
- Sakamoto, Chikao (1911–1998) alumni and former director of Hokkaido and Okinawa Development Bureaux
- Ono, Shinji (1947–1967) former governor of Wakayama Prefecture
- Matsui, Takaji (1956) – alumni, Biologist at Kyoto Municipal Zoo, Japan Center for Amphibians and Reptiles
- Satō, Sanpei (1929-2021) - alumni, manga artist
- Mishima, Hisanori (alumni, architect and urban planner)
- Kita, Chikara (alumni and architect)
- Itoh, Sekisui (born 1914, alumni, ceramic artist and living national treasure)
- Kurosaki, Akira (born 1937, alumni, woodblock artist)
- Yama, Rokuro (1897–1982)
- Mohammad Shorif Uddin, Vice-Chancellor of Green University of Bangladesh.
