= Yoshiomi Tamai =

Japanese philanthropist (1935–2025)

Yoshiomi Tamai 玉井義臣
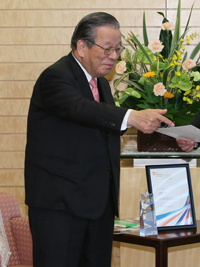
- Tamai in 2012
- Born: 6 February 1935; Osaka Prefecture, Empire of Japan (Now Japan)
- Died: 5 July 2025 (aged 90); Tokyo, Japan
- Education: Shiga University
- Known for: Founder of Ashinaga

Yoshiomi Tamai (玉井 義臣, Tamai Yoshiomi; 6 February 1935 – 5 July 2025) was a Japanese activist, philanthropist and educator who was the founder and president of Ashinaga and the founder and headmaster of Kokorojuku dormitory.

== Early and personal life ==
Yoshiomi Tamai was born on 6 February 1935 in Ikeda, Osaka Prefecture. He grew up in Kansai region, and in 1958, he graduated from Shiga University with a degree in economics. In 1961, he left his job at a brokerage firm to pursue a career in economic journalism. In 1963, Tamai's mother died after being involved in a traffic accident caused by a reckless driver. At that time, Tamai decided he would become Japan's first "traffic critic." Over the next few years, his wife was diagnosed with cancer and died at 29 years old. These two losses were the starting point for Tamai's work on the Ashinaga movement.

== Career ==
=== Association for Traffic Accident Orphans ===
In 1966, Tamai began appearing as a regular guest in a weekly traffic accident prevention corner on the Katsura Kokinji Afternoon Show (TV Asahi), showcasing problems such as the rise in auto insurance premiums and campaigning for the introduction of corporate manslaughter in the Penal Code of Japan. In October 1968, Tamai and Shinji Okajima, who had lost his sister and nephew in a traffic accident, launched the Association to Support Traffic Accidents Orphans and held their first street fundraising campaign in Tokyo. In 1969, the overwhelming public reaction to the collection of poems by traffic accident orphans Tengoku ni iru otōsama (My Father Is in Heaven) prompted the House of Representatives' Budget Committee to formally establish an Association for Traffic Accidents Orphans. The association's purpose was to provide high-school and university students who had lost one or both parents in traffic accidents with student loans. Tamai was appointed as executive director of the association, while Shigeo Nagano, who used to appear with him on the Katsura Kokinji Afternoon Show, was appointed as president. Among the young talents Tamai recruited into the organization, there were future National Diet members Takashi Yamamoto and Osamu Fujimura.

=== Kokorojuku and Ashinaga ===
In 1978, Tamai founded the Kokorojuku dormitory in Hino, Tokyo and was appointed its headmaster. In 1989, he won the Asahi Shimbun Social Welfare Award. Around this time, a part of the Association for Traffic Accident Orphans began accusing Tamai of disloyalty for his interest in supporting other orphaned students, such as those who lost their parents to natural disasters. At the same time, some former Government bureaucrats who were working in the organization fell under suspicion of being too heavily influenced by their political affiliations. Tamai, who opposed the presence of revolving door personnel, ultimately decided to create a new, strictly non-political association in support of all orphaned students. The new organization, established in 1993, was named Ashinaga. Yutaka Takeda, then-CEO of Nippon Steel, was appointed president of Ashinaga, while Tamai himself was appointed vice-president.

=== Other philanthropic work ===
After the Great Hanshin Earthquake of 1995, Tamai started working on providing support for children who had lost one or both parents in a tragic disaster, as well as conducting a comprehensive survey of all previous student loan recipients. In 1998, he took on the role of president at Ashinaga. In 1999, Ashinaga raised funds from donors in over 150 foreign countries, as well as Japan, and used these resources to build Rainbow House, a facility for the emotional care of orphaned children in Kobe. Since 2000, Tamai worked to reduce extreme poverty in the world and he established Rainbow Houses in several developing countries. He also organized a number of international meetings for orphans of war, terrorism, HIV/AIDS, natural disasters, famines, and various pandemics. In June 2010, his collection of essays Dakara, Ashinaga undō wa suteki da (The Beauty of the Ashinaga Movement) was published for Hihyōsha's "Psycho Critique 13" series. In March and April 2011, after the Great East Japan Earthquake, tsunami, and subsequent Fukushima nuclear disaster, Tamai announced that the construction of three new Rainbow Houses in Tohoku region. Since 2012, Tamai worked on developing Ashinaga Africa Initiative, a project that aims to support the higher education of orphaned students from 49 countries in Sub-Saharan Africa. The goal of this project is to foster future leaders, who will bring positive change to their home countries and work to reduce poverty in the region.

== Death ==
On 5 July 2025, Tamai died of sepsis at Japanese Red Cross Medical Center in Shibuya, Tokyo, at the age of 90.

== Recognition ==
=== Awards ===
- 1989: Asahi Shimbun Social Welfare Award
- 1995: Brazilian Order of Rio Branco Medal
- 2003: Asahi Shimbun Social Welfare Award
- 2012: Global Award for Fundraising
- 2015: Eleanor Roosevelt Award for Human Rights
- 2016: Eiji Yoshikawa Culture Award

== Bibliography ==
=== Author ===
- 『株の兵法―名人100人のことば』 (The Art of Stock Trading According to 100 Experts), Dōbunkan Shuppan, 1963
- 『交通犠牲者―恐怖の実態を追跡する』 (Traffic's Sacrificial Victims: Tracing the Dreadful True State of Traffic Accidents in Japan) Kōbundō, 1965
- 『経済市況欄の見方』 (The Companion to Economics and Market Conditions), Dōbunkan Shuppan, 1966
- 『示談―交通事故の知識』 (Settled Out of Court: What We Know about Traffic Accidents), Ushio Shuppansha, Ushio Shinsho, 1966 (a revised edition was published in 1968)
- 『ゆっくり歩こう日本―くるまが地球を滅ぼす』 (Walk Slow, Japan: How Cars Destroy the Planet), Saimaru Shuppankai, 1973
- 『だから、あしなが運動は素敵だ』 (The Beauty of the Ashinaga Movement), Psycho Critique 13, Hihyōsha, 2010

=== Editor ===
- 『金融・証券・商品市場用語辞典』 (A Dictionary of Financing, Security, and Commodity Market Terminology), Dōbunkan Shuppan, 1965 (with Aomizu Masaki)
- 『天国にいるおとうさま』 (My Father Is in Heaven), Saimaru Shuppankai, 1968
- 『明日があるから生きるんだ―君たちの青春のために』 (Living for Tomorrow: Writings for Our Youth), Saimaru Shuppankai, 1971
- 『母さん、がんばろうね―続・天国にいるおとうさま』 (Mommy, Let's Do Our Best! A Sequel to My Father Is in Heaven), Saimaru Shuppankai, 1974
- 『天国にいるおとうさま 改訂版』 (My Father Is in Heaven: Revised Edition), Saimaru Shuppankai, 1977
- 『母が泣いた日』 (The Day My Mother Cried), Saimaru Shuppankai, 1979
- 『あしながおじさん物語』 (Tales of Ashinaga Ojisan), Saimaru Shuppankai, 1985
- 『交通遺児育英会十五年史』 (A Fifteen-year History of the Association for Traffic Accident Orphans), Saimaru Shuppankai, 1985
- 『災害がにくい―災害遺児作文集』 (The Horror of Disasters: Essays by Orphans of Natural Disasters), Saimaru Shuppankai, 1986
