= Hisako Ōishi =

Japanese politician (1936–2012)

- 大石 尚子

Member of the House of Councillors
- In office 28 December 2007 – 4 January 2012
- Preceded by: Takashi Yamamoto
- Succeeded by: Kazuya Tamaki
- Constituency: National PR

Member of the House of Representatives
- In office 26 June 2000 – 8 August 2005
- Preceded by: Tadayoshi Iijima
- Succeeded by: Jun Hayashi
- Constituency: Kanagawa 4th

Member of the Kanagawa Prefectural Assembly
- In office 1971–1989
- Constituency: Kamakura City

Personal details
- Born: 26 August 1936 Etajima, Hiroshima, Japan
- Died: 4 January 2012 (aged 75) Tokyo, Japan
- Party: Democratic (1998–2012)
- Other political affiliations: DSP (1971–1994); NFP (1994–1998)
- Relatives: Akiyama Saneyuki (grandfather)
- Education: Yokohama National University

Hisako Ōishi (大石 尚子, Ōishi Hisako; 26 August 1936 – 4 January 2012) was a Japanese politician of the Democratic Party of Japan, a member of the House of Councillors in the Diet (national legislature). She was born in Etajima, Hiroshima, grew up in Kamakura, Kanagawa Prefecture and a graduate of Yokohama National University. She served in the assembly of Kanagawa Prefecture for five terms since 1971 and in the House of Representatives in Diet for two terms since 2000. In the 2005 general election, she lost her electoral district (Kanagawa 4th) to LDP candidate Jun Hayashi and also failed to win a proportional seat. After that, she made an unsuccessful for the House of Councillors in 2007 when she received 59,718 votes nationwide and ranked 21st on the Democratic list while the Democratic Party only won 20 proportional seats, thereby becoming the top replacement for a seat falling vacant. On December 28, 2007, she took over the seat left vacant by Takashi Yamamoto when he died of cancer.

She was a granddaughter of Akiyama Saneyuki, a Vice Admiral in the Imperial Japanese Navy.
