= Koji Kobayashi (corporate executive) =

Japanese business executive

Koji Kobayashi (小林 耕士, Kobayashi Koji, born October 23, 1948) is a Japanese business executive and the current vice president of Toyota Motor Corporation.

== Career ==
In 1972, Koji Kobayashi graduated from Shiga University and joined Toyota Motor Industry Corporation (later, Toyota Motor Corporation). In 2000, he became the chief manager of the 3rd sales department, was sent on loan to Toyota Financial Services in 2000 and to DENSO Corporation. In 2010, he became representative director and vice president of Denso. He came back to Toyota Motor Corporation as the adviser in 2016 and became vice president of Toyota Motor Corporation in 2018, holding the post of director of Toyota Financial Services. He has been introduced by Shūkan Gendai as the person with the straight talk, nicknamed "Destroyer" or "Idea Man" who calls the president "Toyoda-kun" (The suffix "-kun" is used when the superior speaks to the male junior in the office), as the tower of strength to President Akio Toyoda, and as the person who does not fear demotion and gives fear to 370,000 employees.

He served as a member of the administrative board of the Organising Committee of 2020 Summer Olympics and 2020 Summer Paralympics in 2014 and as a member of the administrative board of the alumni association of Shiga University, "Ryōsui-kai" (陵水会), and the vice chairperson of Nagoya Chamber of Commerce and Industry in 2016.
