= Yoshiji Fukushima =

Japanese corporate executive (born 1933)

Yoshiji Fukushima (福島 吉治, Fukushima Yoshiji; born 5 October 1933) was a Japanese business executive, who served as vice president of Nomura Securities, chairman of the board of directors of Nomura Securities Investment Trust Management Co., Ltd. (later, Nomura Asset Management Co., Ltd.) and chairman of the board of directors of CSK Corporation (later, SCSK) and Sega Corporation.

== Career ==
Yoshiji Fukushima graduated from Shiga University in 1956 and joined Nomura Securities. He moved up through the ranks to the level of director, managing director, senior managing director and vice president of Nomura Securities. He, who had been asserting that increasing deposit assets should be emphasized in the sales to individual clients, was the rival of Yoshihisa Tabuchi who became the president of Nomura Securities later.

After lost in power struggle, he started working for Nomura Securities Investment Trust Management Co., Ltd. (later, Nomura Asset Management Co., Ltd.) as the president in 1990 and then as the chairman of the board of directors. In 1996, he was invited to CSK Corporation (later, SCSK) as the president. After that, he became the chairman of the board of directors of Sega (later, Sega Games).

== Publications ==
- 「緊急インタビュー CSK会長・セガ会長 福島吉治 オーナー・大川功亡き後のCSK・セガの今後を語る」財界 49(9) (通号 1234) p. 56～59 (24 April 2001)
- 「腹心・福島吉治CSK会長が語る「大川功の最期」 (特集 大川功という生き方)」月刊経営塾 16(5) (通号 199) p. 11～17 (May, 2001)
