= Ashinaga (organization) =

Children's charity based in Tokyo, Japan

ASHINAGA
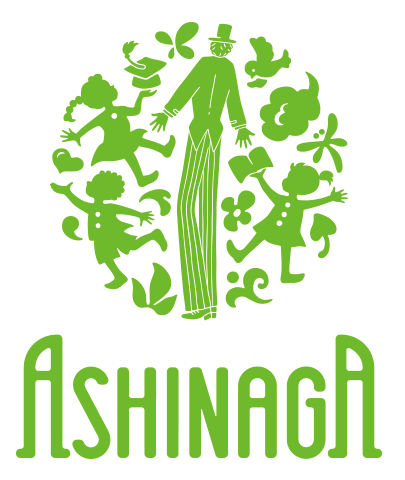
- Founded: 1993
- Founder: Yoshiomi Tamai
- Type: NGO
- Headquarters: Sabo Kaikan 4F, 2-7-5 Hirakawacho, Chiyoda-ku, Tokyo 102-0093, Japan
- Origins: Tokyo, Japan
- Website: www.ashinaga.org

Ashinaga (あしなが育英会 Ashinaga Ikueikai) is a non-profit organization headquartered in Tokyo, Japan that provides educational funding and psychological support to children who have lost one or both guardians, as well as to those whose guardians suffer from serious disabilities. Since its founding in 1993, the organization has raised an estimated $1 billion and has helped over 95,000 students complete high school and/or attend university. Ashinaga also provides residential facilities, psychological support, day programs and camps for both younger children and Ashinaga student loan recipients.

== Origins and mission ==
"Ashinaga" means "long legs" in Japanese. The organization was named after the 1912 novel by Jean Webster called Daddy-Long-Legs, about an orphan whose college attendance is sponsored by an anonymous benefactor. Ashinaga was inspired by, and named after, the anonymous donor described in this novel. In the style of the novel, Ashinaga developed the first anonymous donation system in Japan, in which donors are called "Ashinaga-san."

Yoshiomi Tamai, former president of Ashinaga, advocated for orphans since his mother was killed in a traffic accident in 1963. Ashinaga has had several organizational precursors, with the initial focus on traffic accident orphans eventually expanding to include children who have been orphaned by illness, accidents, suicides, and disasters, as well as those with parents and guardians who have a serious disability. Today, the organization is still headquartered in Japan but has offices in Uganda, Senegal, United Kingdom, Brazil, France and the United States of America and provides assistance to overseas orphans as well. As a movement, therefore, Ashinaga has to date raised an estimated $1 billion and helped over 95,000 students graduate from high school, university and vocational school.

The support Ashinaga provides is both financial, with funds going toward education, and emotional. To domestic students Ashinaga offers interest-free student loans designed to support them in their efforts to attend high school, college, or vocational school, which they repay within 20 years of their graduation date to fund subsequent loans. Since 2006, the organization has been providing full scholarships to overseas orphans to study at Japanese high school and universities, and is currently sponsoring 48 international students from Uganda, Somalia, Rwanda, Indonesia, Sri Lanka, Pakistan, Turkey, Haiti, Iraq and Afghanistan. Ashinaga runs annual summer camps for loan and scholarship recipients with the aim of putting them in touch with those who share similar experiences. For younger orphans, the organization runs day programs and camps with a similar aim at purpose-built Rainbow Houses.

=== Funds ===
Ashinaga operates two complementary systems for fundraising. The first consists of street fundraising campaigns held each spring and fall across Japan, organized by college students receiving Ashinaga student loans. These fundraising activities are staged at over 200 train stations and other sites around Japan. When these campaigns began in 1970, donations were solely for children who had lost parents in traffic accidents. Over the years, support was extended to children who had lost parents due to other kind of accidents, illness, suicide, and natural disasters. From Ashinaga’s first campaign, more than $80 million was raised by street fundraising.

The second system is the deployment of regular anonymous donors, called Ashinaga-san ("Mr." or "Ms. Long-Legs"). All Ashinaga funding comes from individual donors and private companies. Ashinaga receives no government subsidies.

As Ashinaga’s former president, Yoshiomi Tamai received the Resource Alliance’s Global Fundraiser Award at the 2012 International Fundraising Congress. The award is given to individuals who have demonstrated fundraising success over a sustained period of time.

=== 2011 Great East Japan earthquake, tsunami, and nuclear disaster ===
On 11 March 2011, Japan was hardest hit by triple disaster: 9.0 magnitude earthquake, tsunami, and as well as subsequent Fukushima nuclear disaster, which claimed 20,000 deaths. More than two thousand children lost their parents in a triple disaster that hit Tohoku region. On 14 March of that year, Ashinaga moved to provide these children with one-time emergency relief grants and immediately began fundraising for this cause, the organization's first major overseas fundraiser being held in New York City, and later in Philadelphia. As of 31 March 2013, Ashinaga has received nearly 200,000 donations totaling ¥5.9 billion from Japan and overseas for use in providing these grants, as well as scholarships and emotional care for the children, who lost parents in a triple disaster. The majority of the funds eventually gathered came from anonymous donations; 2,081 children, including newborns and students of various educational levels, were provided with emergency relief grants worth ¥2.8 million.

== Activities ==
=== Facilities ===
The organization runs two kinds of facilities for orphans: the Kokoro Juku and Rainbow House.

The Kokoro Juku (こころ塾, "Heart Academy") is a residential facility for university students receiving student loans from Ashinaga. Families of children who have lost parents often struggle financially – meaning tuition and living costs can be a barrier to entering university – so the Kokoro Juku offers students both room and board at low cost. These facilities also offer social guidance and various programs designed to improve reading, writing, and public speaking abilities, the goal being "to help students develop into responsible adults who will contribute to society from a base of kindness and compassion, a board perspective, and an international mindset." There are currently two Kokoro Juku in Tokyo and Kobe, and another such facility in Uganda and Senegal. The Kokoro Juku in Uganda was shortlisted for the Aga Khan Award for Architecture in the 2017–2019 cycle. The dormitory was designed by Terrain Architects, Tokyo, Japan, with a size of 2,140 m². This facility provides accommodation and support for students who have lost one or both parents, enabling them to pursue their education in a supportive environment.

The Rainbow House is for younger orphans, designed as a place where they can receive psychological support. The facilities are used for weekly one-day gatherings on weekends for bereaved children and guardians and overnight events held several times a year for families. The facilities typically also provide training courses for facilitators, volunteers who take care of children who visit the facility. These centers have rubber-walled "volcano rooms", where orphans can hit punching bags to vent frustrations, and a "quiet room" to talk about their emotions. The name for the Rainbow House comes from the aftermath of the 1995 earthquake, when a fourth-grade boy attending an Ashinaga summer camp drew a rainbow, but colored it black. There are now Rainbow Houses in Kobe, Tokyo, Sendai, Ishinomaki and Rikuzentakata in Japan, and Nansana, Uganda.

=== Summer camps ===
Every year, Ashinaga organizes tsudoi (‘集い, lit. "gathering"), summer camps for student loan recipients in 11 different locations across Japan. From 2000 to 2007, Ashinaga held eight international summer camps in Japan for orphans of earthquakes, war, and other disasters overseas. Camps focused on the emotional and psychological care of the children, and allowed both Japanese orphans and those from overseas to interact and share their experiences. Ashinaga also organizes tsudoi in other offices.

=== Ashinaga Uganda ===
Ashinaga Uganda was established in 2001 as an international NGO that provides emotional and educational support to orphans who have lost one or both parents as a result of HIV/AIDS. In 2003, the President of Uganda, H.E. Yoweri Kaguta Museveni, formally opened the Ashinaga Uganda Rainbow House in Nansana.

The Uganda Rainbow House runs several programs. Since 2007, Rainbow House has run a literacy education program called terakoya (寺子屋, lit. "temple schools," private elementary schools), which currently provides lessons in English, Math, Science, Social studies, and Physical education to over 52 orphans, aged 7 to 15. It also runs a care program that provides children with psychological support. The program takes place on Saturdays, and is held about 40 times a year. Each year, a total of approximately 2,000 children participate. Additionally, there is a yearly outing for young children, aged from 9 to 13, and a camp for teenagers, aged 14 and older.

On 13 June 2012, the son of the Emperor of Japan, Prince Akishino, and his wife, Princess Kiko, visited Ashinaga Uganda.

=== Internship program ===
Ashinaga ran its first major internship program in 2014, hosting 100 interns from 28 different universities based in 13 countries. The interns’ main aims were to improve Ashinaga students’ conversational and communicative skills, help them develop educationally, and encourage a self-help mind-set. In addition, the 100 interns along with 50 Japanese students took part in a three-day "Global Student Conference" to discuss ways in which to implement the Ashinaga Africa Initiative.

== Ashinaga Africa Initiative ==
In 2012, Ashinaga announced the start of a new project, the Ashinaga Africa Initiative, which has the stated aim "to liberate bereaved children in Africa from the chains of poverty and provide them with the education that they require to return to their homes as leaders in the fight against poverty, corruption, and exploitation."

The aims of the Ashinaga Africa Initiative include:

- Identifying and select one gifted but needy student who has lost one or both parents from each of Africa's 49 Sub-Saharan nations
- Supporting these students to attend the world's top-ranked universities by providing them with necessary scholarships and living expenses for four years of education
- Coordinating with international "Ashinaga-san" contributors to provide necessary financial assistance in cases where university-based funding is not sufficient to cover the support needed
- Establishing an advisory board consisting of influential individuals (so-called Kenjin and Tatsujin) throughout the world who can serve as mentors for the project
- Eradicating poverty for all orphaned students through increased access to education and professional training

A Kokoro Juku was constructed in Nansana, Uganda, in 2015 support of these aims.

=== "At Home in the World" performances ===
The "At Home in the World" (世界がわが家) performance is the Ashinaga Africa Initiative’s public awareness program. It was first held in March 2014, in Sendai and Tokyo. The concert is a collaborative effort between Ashinaga and Vassar College, directed by John Caird, and features dancing and singing by children from a school run by Ashinaga Uganda, music by members of the Vassar College Choirs, and a wadaiko (traditional Japanese drumming) performed by a team of teenagers from Tohoku region that was devastated by triple disaster in March 2011. More performances are planned for 2015, to be held in New York City, Philadelphia, Washington, D.C., Tokyo, Osaka, and among other cities.

=== Kenjin-Tatsujin Council ===
The council's purpose is to act as an advisory board to Ashinaga, to provide guidance for the Ashinaga Africa Initiative and to develop Ashinaga's institutional trust and authority internationally. Kenjin are intellectual and business leaders held in high public regard and who are knowledgeable about global issues, while Tatsujin are nationally or internationally recognized artists, performers, and athletes who are socially active and globally conscious. As of June 2015, the Council comprises 66 members: 25 members from Europe, 17 members from North America, 11 members from South America and 13 members from Asia. The council is chaired by Louis Schweitzer.
