= Jun Hayashi =

Japanese politician

- 林 潤

Member of the House of Representatives
- In office 11 September 2005 – 21 July 2009
- Preceded by: Hisako Ōishi
- Succeeded by: Kazuyoshi Nagashima
- Constituency: Kanagawa 4th

Personal details
- Born: 23 October 1972 (age 53) Shibuya, Tokyo, Japan
- Party: Liberal Democratic
- Other political affiliations: Restoration (2012)
- Education: Keio University

Jun Hayashi (林 潤, Hayashi Jun; born 23 October 1972) is a former Japanese politician of the Liberal Democratic Party (LDP), who served as a member of the House of Representatives in the Diet (national legislature). A native of Kamakura, Kanagawa and graduate of Keio University, he worked at the national newspaper Mainichi Shimbun from 1995 to 2001. In 2005 he was elected to the House of Representatives for the first time, after running unsuccessfully in 2003.
