= Akira Amari =

Japanese politician

- 甘利 明
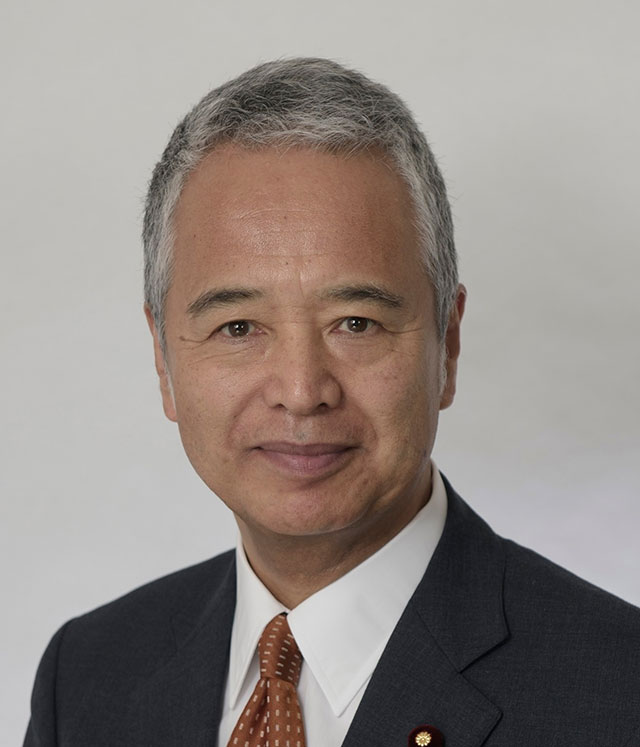
- Official portrait, 2015

Secretary-General of the Liberal Democratic Party
- In office 1 October 2021 – 4 November 2021
- President: Fumio Kishida
- Vice President: Tarō Asō
- Preceded by: Toshihiro Nikai
- Succeeded by: Toshimitsu Motegi

Minister of State for Economic and Fiscal Policy Minister in charge of Economic Revitalization
- In office 26 December 2012 – 28 January 2016
- Prime Minister: Shinzo Abe
- Preceded by: Seiji Maehara
- Succeeded by: Nobuteru Ishihara

Minister of Economy, Trade and Industry
- In office 26 September 2006 – 2 August 2008
- Prime Minister: Shinzo Abe; Yasuo Fukuda
- Preceded by: Toshihiro Nikai
- Succeeded by: Toshihiro Nikai

Minister of Labour
- In office 30 July 1998 – 5 October 1999
- Prime Minister: Keizō Obuchi
- Preceded by: Bunmei Ibuki
- Succeeded by: Takamori Makino

Member of the House of Representatives; from Southern Kanto
- In office 19 December 1983 – 9 October 2024
- Preceded by: Tadashi Amari
- Succeeded by: Multi-member district
- Constituency: See list: Kanagawa 3rd (1983–1996); PR block (1996–2000); Kanagawa 13th (2000–2009); PR block (2009–2012) Kanagawa 13th (2012–2021); PR block (2021–2024)

Personal details
- Born: 27 August 1949 (age 77) Atsugi, Kanagawa, Japan
- Party: Liberal Democratic
- Other political affiliations: NLC (1983–1986)
- Parent: Tadashi Amari (father)
- Education: Keio University

Akira Amari (甘利 明, Amari Akira; born 27 August 1949) is a Japanese politician of the Liberal Democratic Party (LDP) and a former member of the lower house.

== Personal life ==
Amari is a native of Atsugi, Kanagawa, where he attended Kanagawa Prefectural Atsugi High School. He graduated from Keio University in 1972 with a degree in political science. After spending two years working at Sony, he left to work as a secretary for his father, Tadashi Amari, who at the time represented Kanagawa's 3rd district in the House of Representatives.

== Career ==
He is a member of the Japan–Korea Parliamentarians' Union and the Japan-China Friendship Parliamentarians' Union.

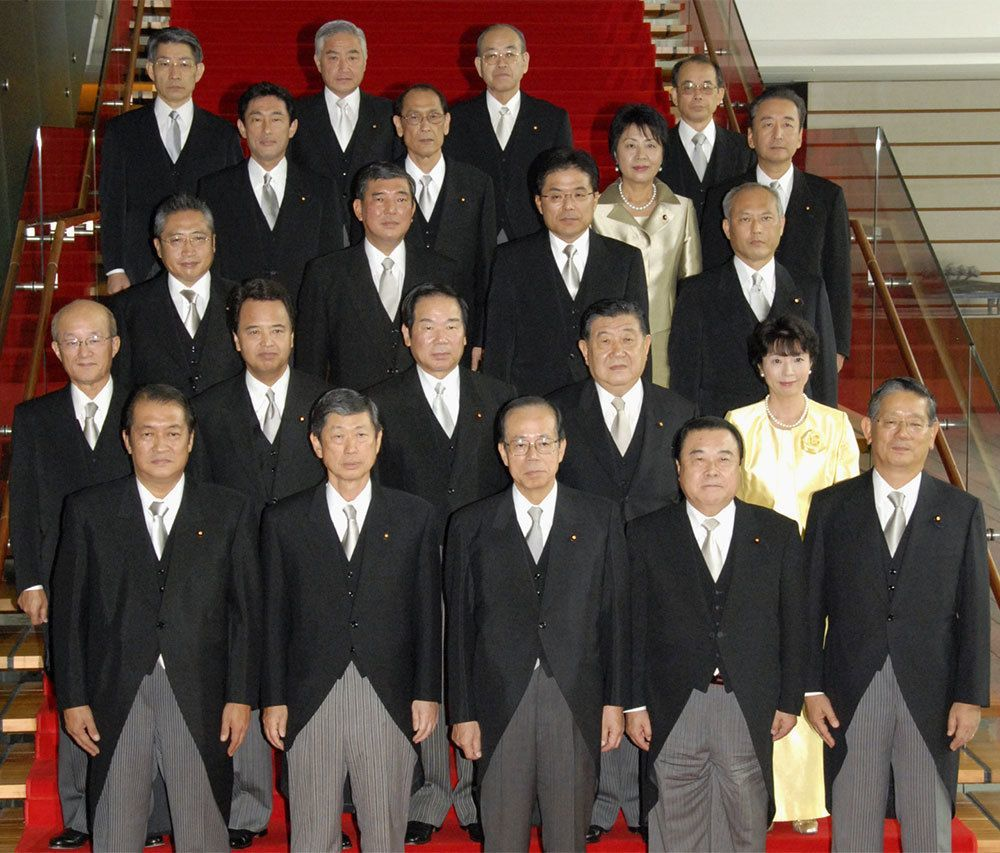
With members of the Yasuo Fukuda Cabinet (September 26, 2007)

He was the Minister of Economy, Trade and Industry from 2006 to 2008.

In the Cabinet of Prime Minister Taro Aso, appointed on 24 September 2008, Amari was appointed as Minister of State in charge of Administrative Reform.

On December 26, 2012, Amari was appointed to the newly created cabinet-level position of Minister of State for Economic Revitalization in the second Cabinet of Prime Minister Shinzo Abe. Amari's responsibilities within the Abe government also include tax and social security reform. Like Abe and most members of the Cabinet, he is affiliated to the openly revisionist organization Nippon Kaigi.

In 2016, Amari resigned from his Cabinet post amidst allegations of bribery, and was succeeded by Nobuteru Ishihara.

In late September 2021, newly elected Prime Minister Fumio Kishida appointed Amari to succeed Toshihiro Nikai as the Secretary General of the LDP. In an upset, Amari lost his seat representing Kanagawa's 13th district to Constitutional Democratic Party opponent Hideshi Futori during the 2021 Japanese general elections, but retained his seat in the lower house as representative of the Southern Kanto proportional representation block. Nevertheless, Amari resigned from his position as the party's Secretary General, and Kishida appointed Toshimitsu Motegi to be his replacement. In the 2024 general election, Amari lost his Kanagawa No. 20 seat to Sayuri Otsuka of the Constitutional Democratic Party of Japan.

Political offices
| Preceded by Bunmei Ibuki | Minister of Labour; 1998–1999 | Succeeded by Takamori Makino |
| Preceded by Toshihiro Nikai | Minister of Economy, Trade and Industry; 2006–2008 | Succeeded by Toshihiro Nikai |
| Preceded by Kaoru Yosano | Minister of State for Regulatory Reform; 2008–2009 | Succeeded by Tomomi Inada (2012) |
| Preceded by Seiji Maehara | Minister of State for Economic and Fiscal Policy; 2012–2016 | Succeeded by Nobuteru Ishihara |
Party political offices
| Preceded by Toshimitsu Motegi | Chief of the Public Relations Headquarters, Liberal Democratic Party; 2011-2012 | Succeeded by Sanae Takaichi |
| Preceded by Toshimitsu Motegi | Chairman of the Policy Research Council, Liberal Democratic Party; 2012 | Succeeded by Sanae Takaichi |
| Preceded by Hiroyuki Hosoda | Chief of the Administrative Reform Promotion Headquarters, Liberal Democratic Party; 2017-2018 | Succeeded by Yasuhisa Shiozaki |
| Preceded by Ryu Shionoya | Chairman of the Election Strategy Committee, Liberal Democratic Party; 2018-2019 | Succeeded by Hakubun Shimomura |
| Preceded by Yoichi Miyazawa | Chairman of the Tax Research Commission, Liberal Democratic Party; 2019-2021 | Succeeded by Yoichi Miyazawa |
| Preceded by Toshihiro Nikai | Secretary-General of the Liberal Democratic Party; 2021 | Succeeded by Toshimitsu Motegi |
