= Kazuhiko Masumoto =

Japanese politician (1936–2022)

- 増本 一彦

Member of the House of Representatives
- In office 10 December 1972 – 9 December 1976
- Preceded by: Yoshiteru Kogane
- Succeeded by: Seat abolished
- Constituency: Kanagawa 3rd

Personal details
- Born: 9 May 1936 Fujisawa, Kanagawa, Japan
- Died: 6 February 2022 (aged 85) Kamakura, Kanagawa, Japan
- Party: Communist
- Education: Chuo University

Kazuhiko Masumoto (Japanese: 増本 一彦 Masumoto Kazuhiko; 9 May 1936 – 6 February 2022) was a Japanese politician of the Japanese Communist Party who served in the House of Representatives from 1972 to 1976, before dying of bile duct cancer at age 85.
