= Hideshi Futori =

Japanese politician

- 太 栄志
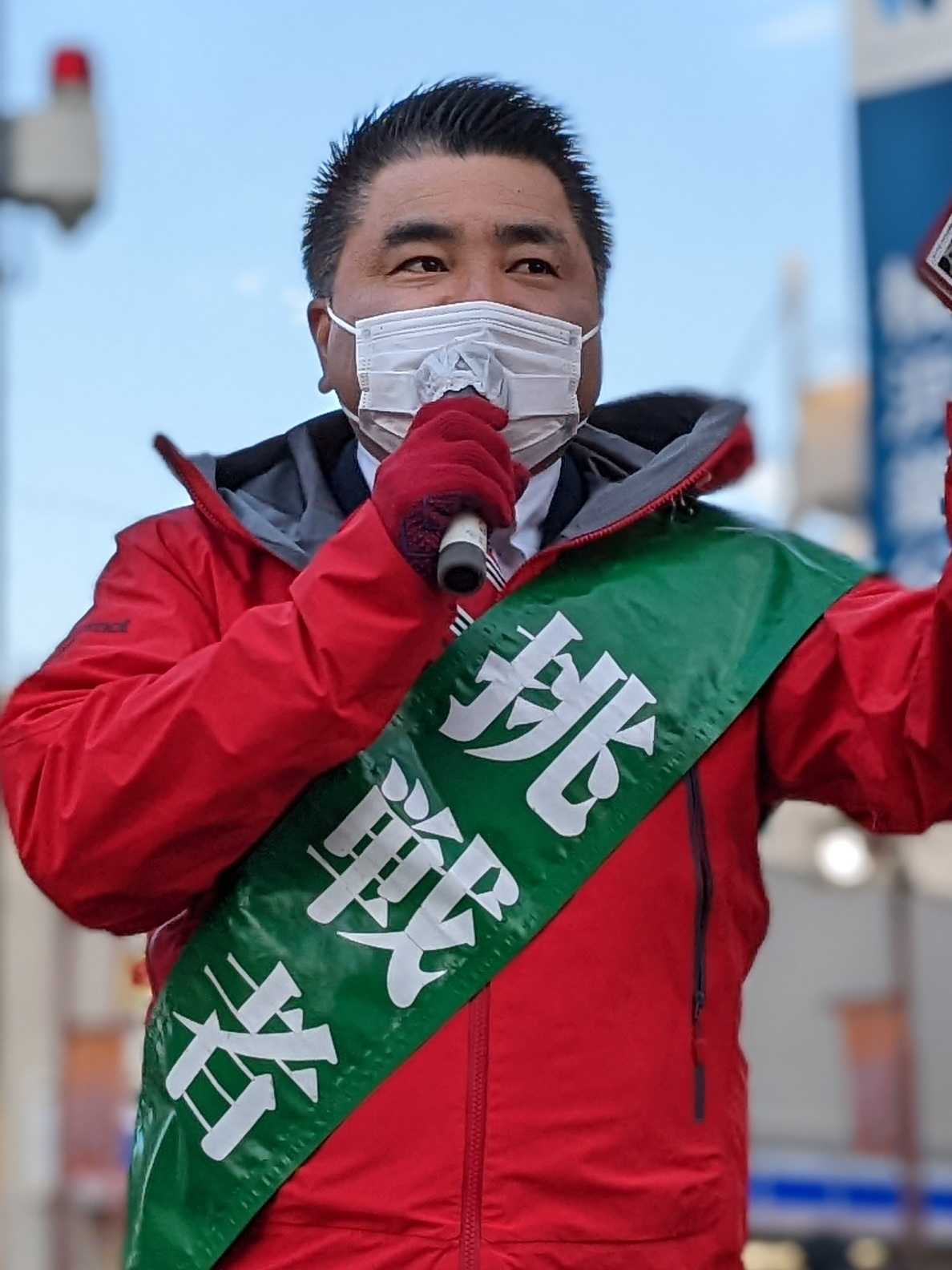
- Futori in 2022

Member of the House of Representatives
- In office 3 November 2021 – 23 January 2026
- Preceded by: Akira Amari
- Succeeded by: Koichiro Maruta
- Constituency: Kanagawa 13th

Personal details
- Born: 27 April 1977 (age 49) China, Kagoshima, Japan
- Party: CRA (since 2026)
- Other political affiliations: DPJ (2003–2016); DP (2016–2017); KnT (2017–2018); DPP (2018–2020); CDP (2020–2026)
- Education: Chuo University (LL.B., M.A.)

Hideshi Futori (Japanese: 太 栄志, romanized: Futori Hideshi; born 27 April 1977) is a Japanese politician who currently serves as a member of the Constitutional Democratic Party (CDP) in the House of Representatives, representing Kanagawa 13th district.

== Early life ==
Hideshi Futori was born in China Town (知名町, China Chō), Kagoshima Prefecture. The town is located in Okinoerabujima which is one of the Amami Islands. He raised there until he finished the junior high school. He entered Reimei Senior High School where is Sendai City, Kagoshima Prefecture. He graduated from the Faculty of Law at Chuo University and the master's course of its graduate school.

== Career ==
He joined the Democratic Party of Japan in 2003 after he began working as a public secretary for Akihisa Nagashima, a member of the House of Representatives representing Tokyo's 21st district (representing the Tokyo proportional representation block from 2005 onwards), and later as his chief of staff. In 2009, he left his position to become a visiting fellow at the Center for U.S.-Japan Studies and Cooperation at Vanderbilt University. Two years later, Futori became a research associate for the Weatherhead Center for International Affairs at Harvard University. He joined the Pacific Forum of the Center for Strategic and International Studies (CSIS) as a Sasakawa Peace Foundation Fellow and the East-West Center as a Japan Studies Fellow in 2012. In 2013, he was made a Japan Scholar in the Asia Program of the Woodrow Wilson International Center for Scholars ("Wilson Center") in Washington, D.C.

Futori unsuccessfully ran as the Kibō no Tō candidate for Kanagawa's 13th district in the 48th House of Representatives general election in 2017, losing to the Liberal Democratic Party's Akira Amari 56.1% to 27.7%. However, facing Amari again in the 2021 Japanese general elections, Futori won 51.1% to 48.9%.
