= Gentaro Kawase =

Japanese businessman, President of Nippon Life Insurance

Gentaro Kawase (川瀬 源太郎, Kawase Gentaro, May 3, 1916 – January 23, 2003) was a Japanese business executive, a former president of Nippon Life Insurance, and was conferred with the Grand Cordon of the Order of the Sacred Treasure.

== Career ==
Gentaro Kawase was born in Ōmihachiman, Shiga Prefecture. He graduated from Hikone Commercial College (later, Shiga University), entered Nippon Life Insurance in 1937 and moved up through the ranks to the level of manager of securities department, chief treasurer in Tokyo, manager of related business. In 1981, he became the vice president of Nippon Life Insurance and the president of Nippon Life Insurance in 1982. He led Nippon Life Insurance to the largest in the world in all 4 indicators, namely insurance premium income, total assets, total amount of new contracts and total amount of insurance in force, as the full year business result of 1987–88. In 1989, he became the chairman of the board of directors of Nippon Life Insurance. From 1996 to 1998, he was the senior adviser and honorary chairman of Nippon Life Insurance. From 1987 until 1994, he served as the vice-chairman of Kansai Economic Federation.

In 1988, he was conferred with the Grand Cordon of the Order of the Sacred Treasure. He died at the hospital in Takarazuka, Hyōgo at 86.
