= William Higuchi =

American chemist

William Higuchi is an American chemist and pharmaceutical scientist and known figure in his field, currently Distinguished Professor Emeritus at University of Utah and who was given an honorary degree from University of Michigan in 2013.
