= Golam Samdani Fakir =

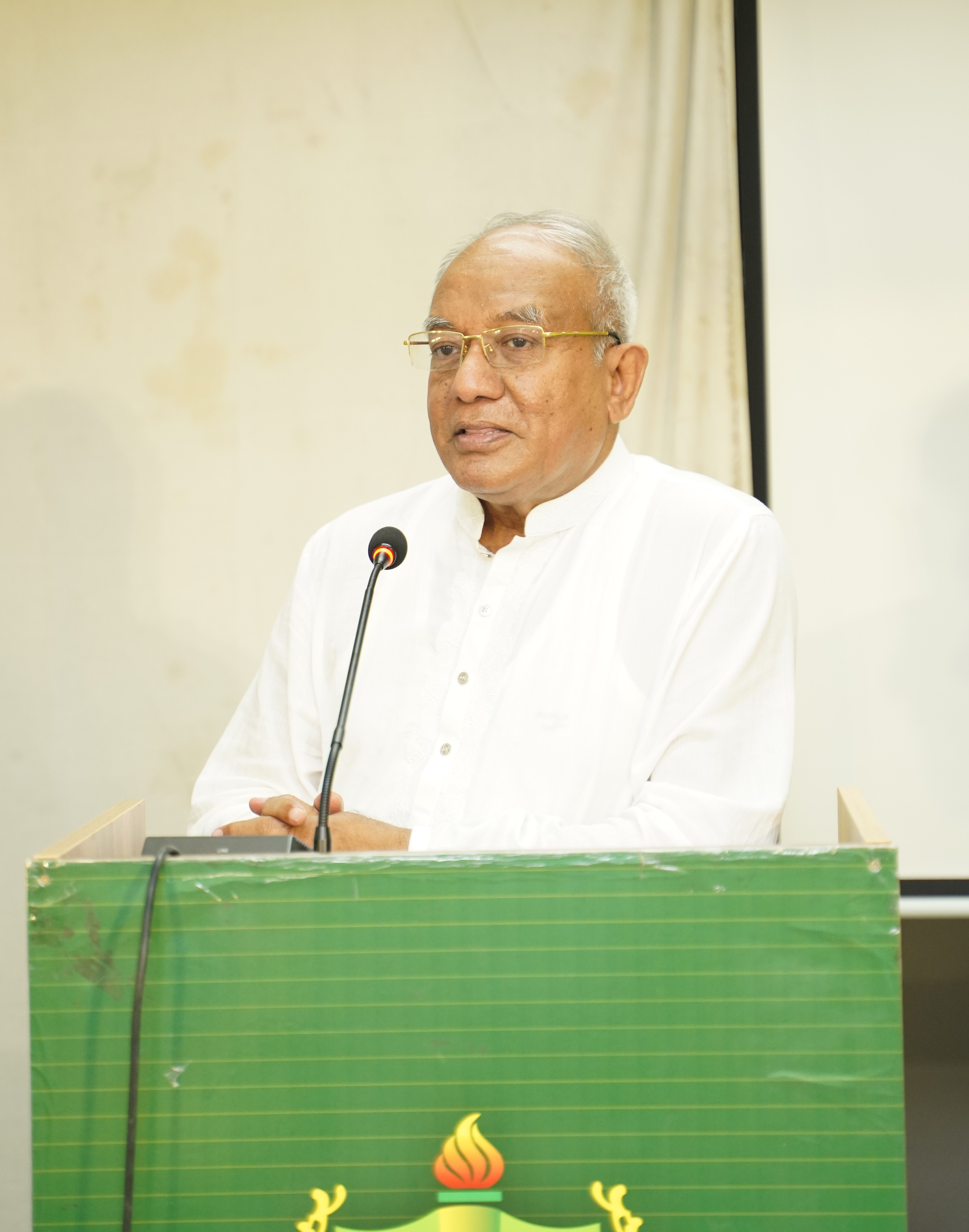
- Born: Brahmanbaria
- Citizenship: Bangladeshi
- Education: University of Dhaka
- Occupation: Professor
- Employer: Green University of Bangladesh
- Known for: Vice Chancellor of Green University of Bangladesh
- Title: Vice Chancellor
- Term: May 16 2013 - August 2023

Golam Samdani Fakir (Bengali: গোলাম সামদানী ফকির) is a Bangladeshi academic. He is serving as the Vice Chancellor of the Green University of Bangladesh from 2013 to 2023.

== Biography ==
Ghulam Samdani was born in 1952 to a Muslim family in Brahmanbaria District. His father, Ataur Rahman Fakir, and his mother Rabeya Khatun Fakir. Ghulam Samdani has one child.

Ghulam Samdani received his honours degree in 1973 and master's degree in 1976 from the Department of Economics in University of Dhaka. Then he received his PhD in Industrial Economics in Bucharest, Romania.

In 1984, Samdani joined BRAC as a Senior Research Economist. Later, from 1997 to 2006, he served as director of the training department of the same institution and the academic head of the postgraduate diploma program in NGO management and leadership at BRAC University. Samdani Fakir worked as a 'Visiting Professor' at the SIT Graduate Institute in the US from 2006 to 2009.

He served as the Deputy Vice-Chancellor of BRAC University from 2009 to 2012.

He joined as vice-chancellor of The Green University of Bangladesh on May 16, 2013, and was later re-appointed after the end of his first term in 2017.

For his contribution to the field of education, Ghulam Samdani Fakir received the 'Global Award' given by the World Education Congress of India, Award for Excellence in Human Resource Development, Award for Excellence in Human Resource Development, George Harrison Award-2016 of the Freelance Journalist Association of Bangladesh, Gold Medal by Atish Dipankar Smriti Parishad-2016 and lifetime achievement by Bangladesh Organization for Learning and Development (BOLD).
