= Akio Nakajima =

Japanese politician (1936–2024)

- 中島 章夫

Member of the House of Councillors
- In office 23 April 2003 – 25 July 2004
- Preceded by: Yoko Komiyama
- Succeeded by: Multi-member district
- Constituency: National PR

Member of the House of Representatives
- In office 19 July 1993 – 27 September 1996
- Preceded by: Seat established
- Succeeded by: Constituency abolished
- Constituency: Kanagawa 3rd

Personal details
- Born: 27 January 1936 Hirakata, Osaka, Japan
- Died: 8 June 2024 (aged 88) Yokohama, Kanagawa, Japan
- Party: Democratic
- Other political affiliations: JNP (1992–1994); NPS (1994–1996); DP (1996–1998)
- Education: Osaka University of Foreign Studies; University of Tokyo
- Occupation: Educational administrator

Akio Nakajima (Japanese: 中島章夫; 27 January 1936 – 8 June 2024) was a Japanese politician. As a member of the Japan New Party, the New Party Sakigake, and the Democratic Party, he served in the House of Representatives from 1993 to 1996 and in the House of Councillors from 2003 to 2004.

== Death ==
Nakajima died in Yokohama on 8 June 2024, at the age of 88.
