= Kanagawa 13th district =

Legislative district of Japan

Kanagawa 13th District
- Parliamentary constituency for the Japanese House of Representatives
- Numbered map of Kanagawa Prefecture single-member districts
- Prefecture: Kanagawa
- Proportional District: Southern Kanto
- Electorate: 373,756

Current constituency
- Created: 1994
- Seats: One
- Party: LDP
- Representative: Kōichirō Maruta
- Municipalities: Ayase, Yamato and Yokohama(Seya-ku)

Kanagawa 13th district is a single-member constituency of the House of Representatives, the lower house of the National Diet of Japan. It is located in Kanagawa Prefecture, and includes the cities of Ayase, Yamato, and Seya-ku.

== List of representatives ==
Election	Representative	Party	Notes
1996	Atsuhiro Tomizawa	New Frontier	
2000	Akira Amari	Liberal Democratic	
2003	Akira Amari	Liberal Democratic	
2005	Akira Amari	Liberal Democratic	
2009	Hidenori Tachibana	Democratic	
2012	Akira Amari	Liberal Democratic	
2014	Akira Amari	Liberal Democratic	
2017	Akira Amari	Liberal Democratic	
2021	Hideshi Futori	CDP	
2024	Hideshi Futori	CDP	
2026	Kōichirō Maruta	LDP	

== Election results ==
2026
Party	Candidate	Votes	%	±%
LDP	Koichiro Maruta	95,453	48.6	▲16.64
CRA	Hideshi Futori (Incumbent)	77,992	39.7	▼7.43
Sanseitō	Tadashi Ishii	22,788	11.6	▲5.14
Majority		17,461	8.9	▼6.27
Registered electors		373,123		
Turnout		196,233	53.80	▲1.83
LDP gain from CDP				

2024
Party	Candidate	Votes	%	±%
CDP	Hideshi Futori (Incumbent)	88,833	47.13	▼3.96
Liberal Democratic	Koichiro Maruta	60,237	31.96	▼16.95
Innovation	Kyo Toshihide	16,531	8.77	New
Sanseitō	Tadashi Ishii	12,177	6.46	New
Communist	Hayakawa Utako	10,703	5.68	New
Majority		28,596	15.17	▲12.99
Registered electors		373,137		
Turnout		188,481	51.97	▼3.80
CDP hold				

2021
Party	Candidate	Votes	%	±%
CDP	Hideshi Futori	130,124	51.09	New
Liberal Democratic	Akira Amari (Incumbent) (elected by PR)	124,595	48.91	▼7.23
Registered electors		471,671		
Turnout			55.77	▲5.15
CDP gain from LDP				

2017
Party	Candidate	Votes	%	±%
Liberal Democratic	Akira Amari (Incumbent)	127,214	56.14	▼4.33
Kibō no Tō	Hideshi Futori	62,779	27.70	New
Communist	Hiroshi Okazaki	36,627	16.16	▲1.70
Registered electors		460,572		
Turnout			50.62	▼1.67
LDP hold				

2014
Party	Candidate	Votes	%	±%
Liberal Democratic	Akira Amari (Incumbent)	142,201	60.47	▲17.51
Innovation	Yūta Ito	58,941	25.06	New
Communist	Yoshimi Takahisa	34,014	14.46	▲8.64
Registered electors		463,907		
Turnout			52.29	▼5.68
LDP hold				

2012
Party	Candidate	Votes	%	±%
Liberal Democratic	Akira Amari (Incumbent - PR)	111,733	42.96	▼2.49
Your	Naotoshi Sugawara	50,826	19.54	New
Restoration	Yūsuke Ōta	43,754	16.82	New
Democratic	Hidenori Tachibana (Incumbent)	38,637	14.86	▼31.24
Communist	Katsuyuki Miyaō	15,131	5.82	▼0.43
Turnout			56.30	
LDP gain from Democratic				

2009
Party	Candidate	Votes	%	±%
Democratic	Hidenori Tachibana	138,104	46.10	▲15.22
Liberal Democratic	Akira Amari (Incumbent) (elected by PR)	136,164	45.45	▼15.62
Communist	Tomoaki Kondō	18,721	6.25	▼1.80
Happiness Realization	Chihiro Suzuki	6,588	2.20	New
Turnout				
Democratic gain from LDP				

2005
Party	Candidate	Votes	%	±%
Liberal Democratic	Akira Amari (Incumbent)	174,361	61.07	▲4.22
Democratic	Ryuji Tsuchida	88,170	30.88	▼4.34
Communist	Tomoaki Kondō	22,970	8.05	▲0.12
Turnout				
LDP hold				

2003
Party	Candidate	Votes	%	±%
Liberal Democratic	Akira Amari (Incumbent)	139,239	56.85	▲11.07
Democratic	Ryuji Tsuchida	86,256	35.22	▲0.44
Communist	Shunji Arai	19,431	7.93	▼0.40
Turnout				
LDP hold				

2000
Party	Candidate	Votes	%	±%
Liberal Democratic	Akira Amari (Incumbent - PR)	114,351	45.78	▲12.56
Democratic	Atsuhiro Tomizawa (Incumbent)	86,879	34.78	New
Communist	Yasuo Nagashima	20,804	8.33	▼3.15
Social Democratic	Hiroyo Chiba	20,695	8.29	New
Liberal League	Tōru Nakamura	7,040	2.82	▲0.62
Turnout				
LDP gain from Democratic				

1996
Party	Candidate	Votes	%	±%
New Frontier	Atsuhiro Tomizawa	73,773	34.03	New
Liberal Democratic	Akira Amari (elected by PR)	72,022	33.22	New
Democratic	Junko Koyama	32,928	15.19	New
Communist	Hiroyuki Ueda	24,895	11.48	New
New Socialist	Yukio Hiraoka	8,413	3.88	New
Liberal League	Masanori Shimizu	4,775	2.20	New
Turnout				
