= Hirotaro Higuchi =

Japanese businessman (1926–2012)

Hirotaro Higuchi (樋口 廣太郎, Higuchi Hirotaro; January 25, 1926 - September 16, 2012) was a Japanese business executive, the representative director and president of The Sumitomo Bank, the representative director and president of Asahi Breweries, and the vice chairman of Keidanren.

== Career ==
Hirotaro Higuchi was born to the family running futon shop in Kyoto in 1926. He graduated from Hikone Commercial College (now, Shiga University). and joined Nomura Securities and got a new job in Nomura Bank (later, The Daiwa Bank, now, Resona Bank). After leaving Nomura Bank, he entered Kyoto University in 1946. In 1949, he graduated from Kyoto University and joined The Sumitomo Bank.

He moved up through the ranks to the level of director of The Sumitomo Bank in 1973, managing director thereof in 1975, representative & senior managing director thereof in 1979 and the representative director & vice president thereof in 1982. After losing in the presidential race with Ichiro Isoda, in 1986, he became the advisor of Asahi Breweries which was then thought unrebuildable and the representative director & president thereof. He became the representative director & chairman of the board of directors thereof in 1992 and director, advisor and honorary chairman in 1999.

He also served as the vice chairman of Keidanren, the president of New National Theatre Foundation, the chairman of Osaka Securities Exchange and the special adviser to the Cabinet.
