= Takashi Yamamoto (politician) =

Japanese politician

- 山本 孝史

Member of the House of Councillors
- In office 29 July 2001 – 22 December 2007
- Preceded by: Yoshiki Yamashita
- Succeeded by: Hisako Ōishi
- Constituency: Osaka at-large (2001–2007); National PR (2007)

Member of the House of Representatives
- In office 19 July 1993 – 2 June 2000
- Preceded by: Takumi Ueda
- Succeeded by: Multi-member district
- Constituency: Osaka 4th (1993–1996); Kinki PR (1996–2000)

Personal details
- Born: 7 July 1949 Ashiya, Hyōgo, Japan
- Died: 22 December 2007 (aged 58) Ariake, Tokyo, Japan
- Party: Democratic (1998–2007)
- Other political affiliations: JNP (1993–1994); NFP (1994–1998); GGP (1998)
- Education: Ritsumeikan University; Michigan State University

Takashi Yamamoto (山本 孝史, Yamamoto Takashi; 7 July 1949 – 22 December 2007) was a Japanese politician of the Democratic Party of Japan, a member of the House of Councillors in the Diet (national legislature).

== Early life and education ==
Yamamoto was a native of Ashiya, Hyōgo close to Osaka. He graduated from Shimizudani High school and Ritsumeikan University, and received a master's degree in sociology of the family from Michigan State University in the United States.

== Political career ==
Yamamoto was elected to the House of Representatives for the first time in 1993 as a member of Morihiro Hosokawa's Japan New Party but lost the seat in 2000. In 2001, he was elected to the House of Councillors for the first time.

He was the expert of the social welfare, and wrestled with many problems in the social security system, such as the reform of a pension policy and the medical system, and the foundation of "the nursing care insurance". During his time in the Diet he was one of the most prolific askers of questions to the house. Hardly any legislation is introduced to the Diet by representatives in Japan ("Act of Parliament"). However, he performed numerous "Acts of Parliament" during his time there.

On May 22, 2006, Yamamoto announced in a speech in the House of Councilors plenary session that he was suffering from cancer. He made an effort for the early conclusion of "The Basic Law to Promote Anti-Cancer (Cancer Control Act) ja:がん対策基本法".

== Charity work ==
From his school days, Yamamoto continued volunteer activities. After graduation, he served a non-profit organization "ASHINAGA" (lit. Daddy Long Legs), an association which helps children orphaned by traffic accidents by providing scholarships.

== Death ==
On December 22, 2007, Yamamoto died of thymic carcinoma. His seat in the House of Councillors was taken over by Hisako Ōishi on December 28.

== Bibliography ==
- "Act of Parliament; A way to the Japanese political activation (議員立法 -- 日本政治活性化への道, Giin-Rippou; Nihon-Seiji Kasseika heno Michi ISBN 978-4-88646-140-7)", published by Daiichi Shorin, 1998.
- ""The Japan Initiavive"; A Political Commentary (構想日本 政治時評, KOSO-NIPPON; Seiji-Jihyo ISBN 978-4-88065-164-4)", published by SUIYOSHA, 2006.
- "For "life" to be able to save; A proposal to the Japanese cancer medical care (救える「いのち」のために -- 日本のがん医療への提言, Sukueru "Inochi" no tame ni; Nihon no Gan-Iryo heno Teigen ISBN 978-4-02-250388-6)", published by Asahi Shimbun, 2008.
