= Green University of Bangladesh =

Private university in Bangladesh

Coordinates: 23.8295015°N 90.5663123°E

- গ্রিন ইউনিভার্সিটি অব বাংলাদেশ
- Monogram of Green University of Bangladesh
- Motto: A Global Higher Education Center of Excellence
- Type: Private Research University
- Established: 2003; 23 years ago
- Accreditation: Institution of Engineers, Bangladesh; Institution of Textile Engineers and Technologists
- Affiliations: University Grants Commission (UGC)
- Chancellor: President Mirza Fakhrul Islam Alamgir
- Vice-Chancellor: Mohammad Shorif Uddin
- Students: 5000
- Location: Purbachal American City, Kanchon 1460, Bangladesh
- Campus: Urban
- Language: English
- Colours
- Website: green.edu.bd

University rankings

Regional – Overall
- QS Asia: 1201-1300 (2026)

Green University of Bangladesh (GUB) (Bengali: গ্রিন ইউনিভার্সিটি অব বাংলাদেশ) is a private research and teaching university located in Purbachal American City, Kanchan, Rupganj, Narayanganj. Established in 2003 under the Private University Act, 1992, the university operates under the accreditation and supervision of the University Grants Commission of Bangladesh (UGC). The President of the People’s Republic of Bangladesh serves as its Chancellor, while Professor Mohammad Shorif Uddin currently serves as the Vice-Chancellor.

Its academic structure comprises four main faculties: the Faculty of Science and Engineering (FSE), Faculty of Business Studies (FBS), Faculty of Arts and Social Sciences (FASS), and Faculty of Law (LAW). All academic curricula are designed and periodically updated in compliance with UGC standards and international quality assurance frameworks.

The university’s permanent campus in Purbachal features academic buildings, laboratories, libraries, and co-curricular facilities. GUB maintains international collaborations and exchange programs with universities in the United States, Canada, the United Kingdom, China, Malaysia, and other countries. It is a member of organizations such as the Association of Private Universities of Bangladesh (APUB), the International Association of University Presidents (IAUP), and the Association of Universities of Asia and the Pacific (AUAP).

Green University of Bangladesh is recognized in the SCImago Institutions Rankings 2025, placing it among the top private universities in Bangladesh.

== History ==
Green University of Bangladesh (GUB) was founded in 2003 under the Private University Act 1992. It is owned by US-Bangla group.

== Administration ==
The university has four faculties. Each faculty has departments. A dean is the head of each faculty, while departments are headed by chairpersons.

== List of vice-chancellors ==
- Md. Golam Samdani Fakir (May 2013 – 2023)
- Mohammad Shorif Uddin (16 May 2024 - current)

== Faculties and departments ==
=== Faculty of Science and Engineering ===
==== Undergraduate programs ====
- B.Sc. in Artificial Intelligence and Data Science
- B.Sc. in Computer Science and Engineering
- B.Sc. in Electrical and Electronics Engineering
- B.Sc. in Software Engineering
- B.Sc. in Textile Engineering
- B.Sc. in Civil Engineering (Proposed)
- B.Sc. in Robotics and Intelligence Systems (Proposed)

=== Faculty of Business Studies ===
==== Undergraduate program ====
- Bachelor of Business Administration (BBA)

==== Graduate program ====
- Master of Business Administration (MBA)
- Master of Business Administration (EMBA)

=== Faculty Arts and Social Sciences ===
==== Undergraduate program ====
- Bachelor of Arts (Hons) in English
- BSS (Hons) Journalism & Media Communication
- BSS (Hons) in Sociology

=== Faculty of Law ===
==== Undergraduate program ====
- Bachelor of Laws (LL.B.)

==== Graduate program ====
- Master of Laws (LL.M.)

== Scholarship arrangement ==
There are special discounts on tuition fees including scholarships for poor and meritorious students. Scholarships can provide discounts ranging from 25% to 100% for undergraduate programs.

== Journals ==
- Green University of Bangladesh Journal of Science and Engineering (GUBJSE)
- Green University Review of Social Sciences (GURSS)
