= Kanagawa Prefectural Assembly =

Parliament of Kanagawa, Japan

Kanagawa Prefectural Assembly 神奈川県議会

Type
- Type: Unicameral

Leadership
- Chairman: Hiroyuki Umezawa, LDP
- Vice Chairman: Hitoshi Watanabe, Kōmeitō

Structure
- Seats: 105
- Political groups: Metropolitan Government (98) LDP (50) CDP (26) DPFP (8) Kōmeitō (8) Prefectural Government (5) Oshikai (1) Neutral (2) My Town (1) Kanagawa Movement Network (1) Metropolitan Opposition (5) JCP (5)

Elections
- Last election: 7 April 2019

Meeting place
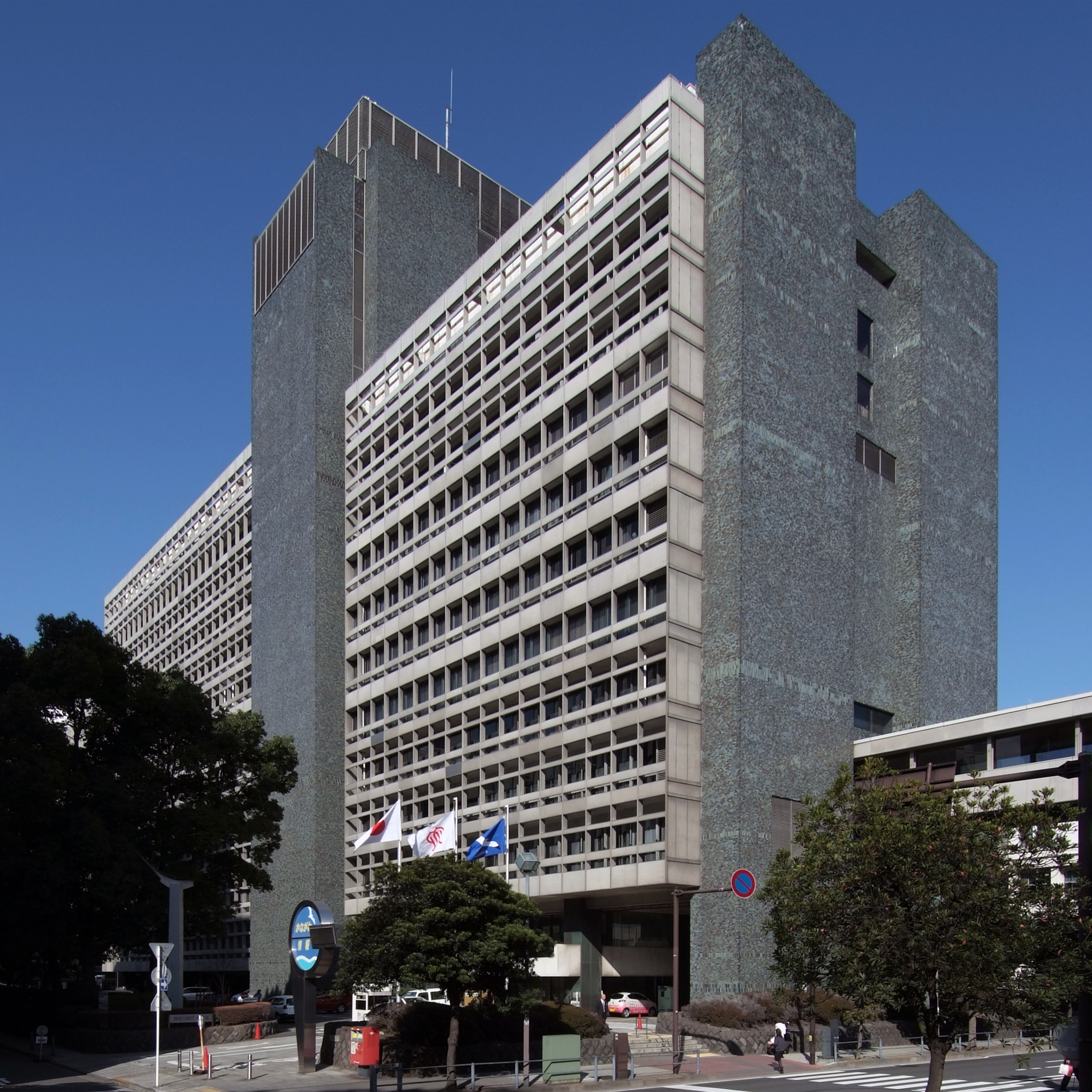

Website
- www.pref.kanagawa.jp/cnt/gikai/

Kanagawa Prefectural Assembly is a prefectural assembly of Kanagawa Prefecture.

== History ==
The Kanagawa Prefectural Assembly was established on 22 July 1878 and prefectural rule was established on the basis of the 1878 Prefectural Regulation No.18 (daijō-kan No. 18). For the first assembly, 47 members were elected by registered votes from one district and 15 counties. The term is four years.

== Organisation ==
=== President and Vice-President ===
- President: Makoto Kunimatsu (LDP), elected from Fujisawa
- Vice-President: Takanori Takita (CDP), elected from Nakahara-ku.
