= Shimane 1st district =

Japan House of Representatives constituency

- Parliamentary constituency for the Japanese House of Representatives
- Numbered map of Shimane Prefecture single-member districts
- Prefecture: Shimane
- Proportional District: Chugoku
- Electorate: 259,179

Current constituency
- Created: 1994
- Seats: One
- Party: LDP
- Representative: Emiko Takagai
- Municipalities: Matsue, Yasugi, Unnan, Nita District, Iishi District, and Oki District

Shimane 1st district is a constituency of the House of Representatives in the Diet of Japan.

== History ==
Since the introduction of the Single-member district to Japan beginning in 1994, Hiroyuki Hosoda of the Liberal Democratic Party has been elected continuously, backed by the solid foundation of support the Hosoda family has built in Shimane, starting with Hiroyuki Hosoda's father, Kichizo Hosoda. Shimane also serves as a conservative kingdom for the LDP. Hiroyuki was extremely knowledgeable in elections; Noboru Takeshita praised him as "the most knowledgeable about politics outside of myself". In 2005, Hosoda became Chief Cabinet Secretary, and has additionally held the roles of Secretary-General of the Liberal Democratic Party and Party Chairman of General Affairs. Due to this, Hosoda himself rarely returned to campaign in the district, but usually won by hefty margins, with no other candidates even winning a spot in the overall Chūgoku proportional representation block (outside of the 2009 Japanese general election, where Toshiaki Komuro managed to win a spot. He lost it in the 2012 Japanese general election).

The death of the Takeshita brothers (Noboru, along with Wataru Takeshita) has strained LDP influence in the prefecture. Additionally, Hiroyuki Hosoda himself died in October 2023. Prior to this, Hosoda's margin of victory had been halved; prior to 2017, he had won by nearly thirty points in every election. In the 2017 Japanese general election, this was cut down to twenty, and Akiko Kamei became the first opposition politician since 2009 to return on a proportional block. Despite her losing the proportional seat in the 2021 Japanese general election, Hosoda's margin of victory had been cut down to a further fifteen points. With Hosoda's death and extreme unpopularity relating to his sexual harassment scandals and ties to the Unification Church, the by-election due to occur in April 2024, were projected to be unusually close. The opposition unified around Akiko Kamei, who won with a clear majority, marking the first time an opposition delegate had ever been elected from Shimane since the introduction of FPTP seats.

== Areas covered ==
- Matsue
- Yasugi
- Unnan
- Nita District
- Iishi District
- Oki District

Additionally, the Liancourt Rocks are included in the district.

== List of representatives ==
Election	Representative	Party	Notes
1996	Hiroyuki Hosoda	Liberal Democratic	Hosoda died on November 10, 2023.
2000	Hiroyuki Hosoda	Liberal Democratic	Hosoda died on November 10, 2023.
2003	Hiroyuki Hosoda	Liberal Democratic	Hosoda died on November 10, 2023.
2005	Hiroyuki Hosoda	Liberal Democratic	Hosoda died on November 10, 2023.
2009	Hiroyuki Hosoda	Liberal Democratic	Hosoda died on November 10, 2023.
2012	Hiroyuki Hosoda	Liberal Democratic	Hosoda died on November 10, 2023.
2014	Hiroyuki Hosoda	Liberal Democratic	Hosoda died on November 10, 2023.
2017	Hiroyuki Hosoda	Liberal Democratic	Hosoda died on November 10, 2023.
2021	Hiroyuki Hosoda	Liberal Democratic	Hosoda died on November 10, 2023.
Vacant (November 2023 - April 2024)
2024 b	Akiko Kamei	CDP	
2024	Akiko Kamei	CDP	
2026	Emiko Takagai	LDP	

== Election results ==
2026
Party	Candidate	Votes	%	±%
LDP (Endorsed by Ishin)	Emiko Takagai	67,438	51.0	▲7.00
CRA	Akiko Kamei	49,687	37.7	▼13.39
Sanseitō	Reiji Ito	10,041	7.6	New
JCP	Eriko Muraho	4,978	3.8	▼1.20
Registered electors		248,789		
Turnout		132,324	53.83	▼4.28
LDP gain from Centrist Reform				

2024
Party	Candidate	Votes	%	±%
CDP	Akiko Kamei	73,484	51.08	▼7.74
LDP, Komeito	Emiko Takagai	63,238	43.96	▲2.78
JCP	Eriko Muraho	7,142	4.96	New
Turnout		252,586	58.11	▲3.49

2024 by-election
Party	Candidate	Votes	%	±%
CDP	Akiko Kamei	82,691	58.82	▲17.51
LDP, Komeito	Norimasa Nishikori	57,897	41.18	▼14.84
Turnout		261,190	54.62	▼6.61

2021
Party	Candidate	Votes	%	±%
LDP, Komeito	Hiroyuki Hosoda	90,638	56.02	▼3.38
CDP, SDP, JCP	Akiko Kamei	66,847	41.31	▲0.71
Independent	Akiko Kamei (Note: Unrelated to Akiko Kamei, the CDP candidate.)	4,319	2.67	New
Turnout		268,337	61.23	▲2.06

2017
Party	Candidate	Votes	%	±%
LDP, Komeito	Hiroyuki Hosoda	95,513	59.40	▼4.86
CDP, SDP, DPP	Akiko Kamei	65,285	40.60	New
Turnout		276,664	59.17	▲1.23

2014
Party	Candidate	Votes	%	±%
LDP, Komeito	Hiroyuki Hosoda	100,376	64.26	▼0.41
DPJ	Shoichiro Wada	38,346	24.55	▼2.64
JCP	Yoshio Uedai	17,476	11.19	▲3.05

2012
Party	Candidate	Votes	%	±%
LDP, Komeito	Hiroyuki Hosoda	112,605	64.67	▲7.48
DPJ	Toshiaki Komuro	47,343	27.19	▼10.5
JCP	Keiko Yoshigi	14,173	8.14	▲3.98

2009
Party	Candidate	Votes	%	±%
LDP	Hiroyuki Hosoda	122,595	57.19	▼3.33
DPJ, PNP	Toshiaki Komuro	80,789	37.69	▲9.05
JCP	Ikuhisa Ishitobi	8,923	4.16	▼2.01
HRP	Kenichiro Ikeda	2,060	0.96	New

2005
Party	Candidate	Votes	%	±%
LDP	Hiroyuki Hosoda	125,401	60.52	▼0.5
DPJ	Kazuhisa Hamaguchi	59,334	28.64	▼2.97
JCP	Kiyoichi Tanaka	12,786	6.17	▼1.2
SDP	Katsumi Kano	9,675	4.67	New

2003
Party	Candidate	Votes	%	±%
LDP	Hiroyuki Hosoda	117,897	61.02	▲10.1
DPJ	Kazuhiza Hamaguchi	61,071	31.61	▲5.98
JCP	Yoshio Uedai	14,237	7.37	▲1.54

2000
Party	Candidate	Votes	%	±%
LDP	Hiroyuki Hosoda	74,163	50.92	▼1.2
DPJ	Daikichi Ishibashi	37,323	25.63	▼7.15
Independents	Hisato Iwamoto	25,671	17.63	New
JCP	Haruo Yoshikawa	8,484	5.83	▼9.27

1996
Party	Candidate	Votes	%	±%
LDP	Hiroyuki Hosoda	73,907	52.12	New
DPJ	Daikichi Ishibashi	46,481	32.78	New
JCP	Yoshiko Nakabayashi	21,416	15.10	New
