= 2nd district =

2nd district may refer to:

== Australia ==
- 2nd Military District (Australia)

== Hungary ==
- 2nd district of Budapest

== Japan ==
- Aomori 2nd district
- Aomori 2nd district (1947–1993)
- Hyogo 2nd district
- Ishikawa 2nd district
- Kagawa 2nd district
- Kagoshima 2nd district
- Kanagawa 2nd district
- Kumamoto 2nd district
- Kyoto 2nd district
- Kyoto 2nd district (1947–93)
- Nagasaki 2nd district
- Nara 2nd district
- Okinawa 2nd district
- Tokyo 2nd district
- Tokyo 2nd district (1928–42)
- Tokyo 2nd district (1947–93)
- Tochigi 2nd district
- Yamaguchi 2nd district
- Yamaguchi 2nd district (1928–42)

== Philippines ==
- 2nd District of Agusan del Norte
- 2nd District of Manila
- 2nd District of Rizal
- Albay's 2nd congressional district
- Batangas's 2nd congressional district
- Bohol's 2nd congressional district
- Bulacan's 2nd congressional district
- Cagayan's 2nd congressional district
- Cavite's 2nd congressional district
- Cebu's 2nd congressional district
- Ilocos Sur's 2nd congressional district
- Iloilo's 2nd congressional district
- La Union's 2nd congressional district
- Laguna's 2nd congressional district
- Leyte's 2nd congressional district
- Negros Occidental's 2nd congressional district
- Negros Oriental's 2nd congressional district
- Nueva Ecija's 2nd congressional district
- Pampanga's 2nd congressional district
- Pangasinan's 2nd congressional district
- Quezon City's 2nd congressional district
- Quezon's 2nd congressional district
- Rizal's 2nd congressional district
- Samar's 2nd congressional district
- Sorsogon's 2nd congressional district
- Tarlac's 2nd congressional district

== Turkey ==
- Ankara (2nd electoral district)
- Bursa (2nd electoral district), an electoral district of Turkey
- Istanbul (2nd electoral district)
- İzmir (2nd electoral district)

== United States ==
=== Legislative districts ===
- Alabama's 2nd congressional district
- Arkansas's 2nd congressional district
- Arizona's 2nd congressional district
- Arizona's 2nd legislative district
- California's 2nd district (disambiguation)
  - California's 2nd congressional district
  - California's 2nd State Assembly district
  - California's 2nd State Senate district
- Colorado's 2nd congressional district
- Colorado's 2nd Senate district
- Connecticut's 2nd congressional district
- Florida's 2nd congressional district
- Georgia's 2nd congressional district
- Georgia's 2nd Senate district
- Hawaii's 2nd congressional district
- Idaho's 2nd congressional district
- Indiana's 2nd congressional district
- Iowa's 2nd congressional district
- Illinois's 2nd congressional district
- Kansas's 2nd congressional district
- Kentucky's 2nd congressional district
- Louisiana's 2nd congressional district
- Maine's 2nd congressional district
- Maryland's 2nd congressional district
- Massachusetts's 2nd congressional district
- Michigan's 2nd congressional district
- Michigan's 2nd House of Representatives district
- Michigan's 2nd Senate district
- Minnesota's 2nd congressional district
- Mississippi's 2nd congressional district
- Missouri's 2nd congressional district
- Nebraska's 2nd congressional district
- Nevada's 2nd congressional district
- New Hampshire's 2nd congressional district
- New Jersey's 2nd congressional district
- 2nd Legislative District (New Jersey)
- New Mexico's 2nd congressional district
- New York's 2nd congressional district
- North Carolina's 2nd congressional district
- Oklahoma's 2nd congressional district
- Ohio's 2nd congressional district
- Ohio's 2nd senatorial district
- Oregon's 2nd congressional district
- Pennsylvania's 2nd congressional district
- Rhode Island's 2nd congressional district
- South Carolina's 2nd congressional district
- Tennessee's 2nd congressional district
- Texas's 2nd congressional district
- Utah's 2nd congressional district
- Utah's 2nd State Senate district
- Virginia's 2nd congressional district
- West Virginia's 2nd congressional district
- Wisconsin's 2nd congressional district

== Other uses ==
- 2nd District of Columbia Infantry Regiment, an infantry unit during the American Civil War

== See also ==
- District 2 (disambiguation)
