= Hajime Tamura =

Japanese politician (1924–2014)

- 田村 元
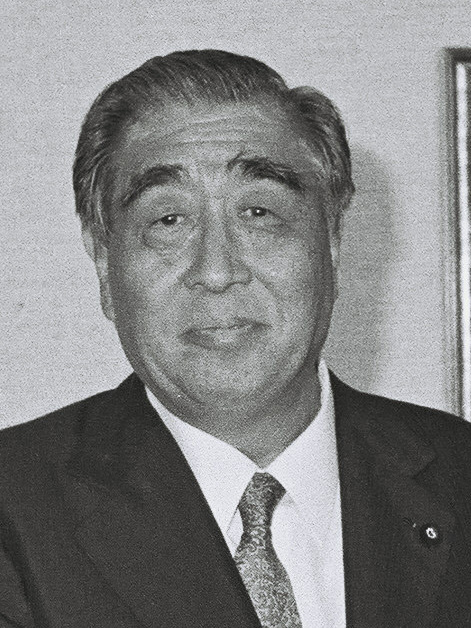
- Tamura in 1986

Speaker of the House of Representatives
- In office 2 June 1989 – 24 January 1990
- Monarch: Akihito
- Deputy: Yoshinori Yasui
- Preceded by: Kenzaburo Hara
- Succeeded by: Yoshio Sakurauchi

Minister of International Trade and Industry
- In office 22 July 1986 – 27 December 1988
- Prime Minister: Yasuhiro Nakasone; Noboru Takeshita
- Preceded by: Michio Watanabe
- Succeeded by: Hiroshi Mitsuzuka

Minister of Transport
- In office 14 December 1976 – 28 November 1977
- Prime Minister: Takeo Fukuda
- Preceded by: Hirohide Ishida
- Succeeded by: Kenji Fukunaga

Minister of Labour
- In office 7 July 1972 – 22 December 1972
- Prime Minister: Kakuei Tanaka
- Preceded by: Toshio Tsukahara
- Succeeded by: Tsunetaro Kato

Member of the House of Representatives
- In office 28 February 1955 – 27 September 1996
- Preceded by: Kiyoshi Nakamura
- Succeeded by: Constituency abolished
- Constituency: Mie 2nd

Personal details
- Born: 9 May 1924 Matsuzaka, Mie, Japan
- Died: 1 November 2014 (aged 90) Shibuya, Tokyo, Japan
- Party: Liberal Democratic
- Children: 3
- Relatives: Norihisa Tamura (nephew); Masahito Moriyama (son-in-law)
- Education: Keio University

Hajime Tamura (田村 元, Tamura Hajime) (5 May 1924 – 1 November 2014) was a Japanese politician. He held different cabinet posts and served as the speaker of the House of Representatives.

== Early life and education ==
Tamura was born in Matsuzaka, Mie Prefecture, in 1924. In 1950, he received a law degree from Keio University.

== Political career ==
Tamura was a member of the Liberal Democratic Party. He was first elected to the House of Representatives in 1955. In the party Tamura was one of the leaders of the Interparty Relations Committee and belonged to the faction led by Kakuei Tanaka.

He was appointed labour minister in 1972 and transport minister in 1976. As of 1975 he was the chairman of the Committee of Korean Affairs of the Afro-Asian Problems Study Group. In July that year Tamura headed a delegation which visited North Korea and met with Korean ruler Kim Il Sung in Pyongyang.

From 1986 until 1988, Tamura served as Minister of International Trade and Industry (MITI) in the cabinets led by Prime Minister Yasuhiro Nakasone and then by Noboru Takeshita. Tamura's brief tenure as MITI minister largely revolved around the Toshiba–Kongsberg scandal, when Toshiba was caught illegally selling machinery intended for the production of nuclear submarine propellers to the Soviet Union. According to then-congressman Duncan Hunter, these noise-reduced propellers meant that the range at which American nuclear submarines could detect Soviet nuclear submarines was reduced by 50%. In the midst of the ensuing scandal, Tamura traveled to the United States at the behest of Prime Minister Nakasone to formally apologize to US Secretary of Defense Caspar Weinberger. In December 1988, Hiroshi Mitsuzuka replaced Tamura as MITI minister.

Tamura became the speaker of the House of Representatives on 2 June 1989, replacing Kenzaburo Hara in the post. Tamura's term ended on 24 January 1990 when Yoshio Sakurauchi was appointed speaker. Tamura, nicknamed the “wheeler-dealer” in political arena, continued to serve as a member of the House of Representatives until his retirement from politics in 1996.

== Personal life and death ==
Tamura was married and has three daughters. His nephew, Norihisa Tamura, served as the Minister of Health, Labour, and Welfare under Prime Minister Yoshihide Suga. Tamura died of natural causes in November 2014, at age 90.

House of Representatives (Japan)
Preceded by Kinji Moriyama	Chair, Committee on Construction of the House of Representatives; 1966	Succeeded by Kunio Morishita
Preceded by Tsuneo Uchida	Chair, Committee on Financial Affairs of the House of Representatives; 1968	Succeeded by Masami Tanaka
Preceded by Noboru Takeshita	Chair, Committee on Budget of the House of Representatives; 1979–1980	Succeeded by Osanori Koyama
Preceded by Kenzaburo Hara	Speaker of the House of Representatives of Japan; 1989–1990	Succeeded by Yoshio Sakurauchi
Party political offices
Preceded by Kichirō Tazawa	Chair, Diet Affairs Committee of the Liberal Democratic Party; 1981–1982	Succeeded by Hikosaburō Okonigi
Political offices
Preceded by Toshio Tsukahara	Minister of Labour; 1972	Succeeded by Tsunetaro Kato
Preceded by Hirohide Ishida	Minister of Transport; 1976–1977	Succeeded by Kenji Fukunaga
Preceded by Michio Watanabe	Minister of International Trade and Industry; 1986–1988	Succeeded by Hiroshi Mitsuzuka
