= Kazuya Kondo =

Japanese politician

- 近藤 和也
- Kondo in 2026

Member of the House of Representatives; from Hokuriku-Shin'etsu
- Incumbent
- Assumed office 22 October 2017
- Preceded by: Multi-member district
- Constituency: PR block (2017–2024); Ishikawa 3rd (2024–2026); PR block (2026–present)
- In office 30 August 2009 – 16 November 2012
- Preceded by: Shigeo Kitamura
- Succeeded by: Shigeo Kitamura
- Constituency: Ishikawa 3rd

Personal details
- Born: 12 December 1973 (age 52) Nakanoto, Ishikawa, Japan
- Party: DRP (since 2026)
- Other political affiliations: DPJ (2006–2016); DP (2016–2017); KnT (2017–2018); DPP (2018–2020); CDP (2020–2026); CRA (2026)
- Education: Kyoto University

Kazuya Kondo (born 12 December 1973) is a Japanese politician who is a member of the House of Representatives of Japan.

== Biography ==
He studied economics at the University of Tokyo.

In 2009 he was elected to the House of Representatives as member of the Democratic Party of Japan, but lost his seat in 2012, and lost again in 2014. He was elected in the 2017 Japanese general election and re-elected in 2021 as a member of the Constitutional Democratic Party of Japan.
