= Emiko Takagai =

Japanese politician

- 高階 恵美子
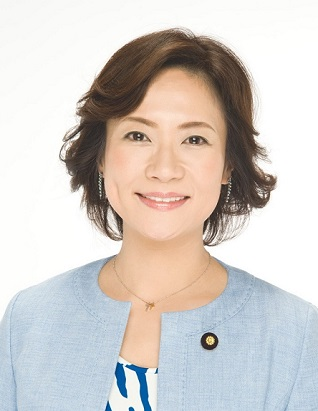
- Official portrait, 2018

Member of the House of Representatives
- Incumbent
- Assumed office 9 February 2026
- Preceded by: Akiko Kamei
- Constituency: Shimane 1st
- In office 1 November 2021 – 9 October 2024
- Constituency: Chugoku PR

Member of the House of Councillors
- In office 26 July 2010 – 19 October 2021
- Constituency: National PR

Personal details
- Born: 21 December 1963 (age 62) Kami, Miyagi, Japan
- Party: Liberal Democratic
- Education: Tokyo Medical and Dental University
- Website: Emiko Takagai website

Emiko Takagai (高階 恵美子, Takagai Emiko; born 21 December 1963) is a Japanese politician of the Liberal Democratic Party, who serves as a member of the House of Representatives.

== Early years ==
On 21 December 1963, Takagai was born in Kami, Kami District, Miyagi Prefecture. In March 1993, she graduated from the Department of Health Care Sciences at Tokyo Medical and Dental University's Faculty of Medicine. She went on to complete the Master's program at the Graduate School of Medical and Dental Sciences in March 1995, earning a Master of Health Sciences. In March 1997, she withdrew from the doctoral program at the same graduate school and, that April, was appointed as an education instructor within the Faculty of Medicine at Tokyo Medical and Dental University.

Later, in 2000, she joined the Ministry of Health, Labour and Welfare as a Nursing Technical Officer, and in 2008, she was appointed as an executive of the Japanese Nursing Association.

== Political career ==
In the 2010 House of Councillors election, Takagai ran in National PR and won a seat.

In September 2014, she was appointed to the Parliamentary Secretary for Health, Labour and Welfare in the Second Abe reshuffled cabinet. After the general election, she was re-appointed to the Parliamentary Secretary for Health, Labour and Welfare in the Third Abe cabinet and served until October 2015.

In the 2016 House of Councillors election, she was re-elected.

In October 2018, she was appointed to State Minister of Health, Labour and Welfare in the Fourth Abe first reshuffled cabinet and served until September 2019.

In the 2021 general election, the LDP nominated her on the party list of the Chugoku PR block so that she lost the position as a member of the House of Councillors automatically. As a result of election, she won a seat in the PR block.

On 7 September 2024, the LDP Shimane Prefectural Federation decided to nominate Takagai as a candidate for the Shimane 1st district.

In the 2024 general election, she lost to CDP incumbent Akiko Kamei and lost re-election.

In the 2026 general election, she defeated CRA's Kamei and gained the Shimane 1st seat.
