= District 2 =

District 2 may refer to:

== Places by country ==
- II District, Turku, in Finland
- District 2, Düsseldorf, Germany
- District 2, Grand Bassa County, a district in Liberia
- District 2, an electoral district of Malta
- District 2, a police district of Malta
- District 2 (Zürich), a district in the city of Zürich, Switzerland
- District 2 (New York City Council), a New York city council district, U.S.
- District 2, Ho Chi Minh City, Vietnam

== Fiction ==
- District 2 (Hunger Games), a fictional district in the Hunger Games books and films

== See also ==
- 2nd district (disambiguation)
- Sector 2 (Bucharest)
