= Kichirō Tazawa =

Japanese politician (1918–2001)

- 田澤 吉郎
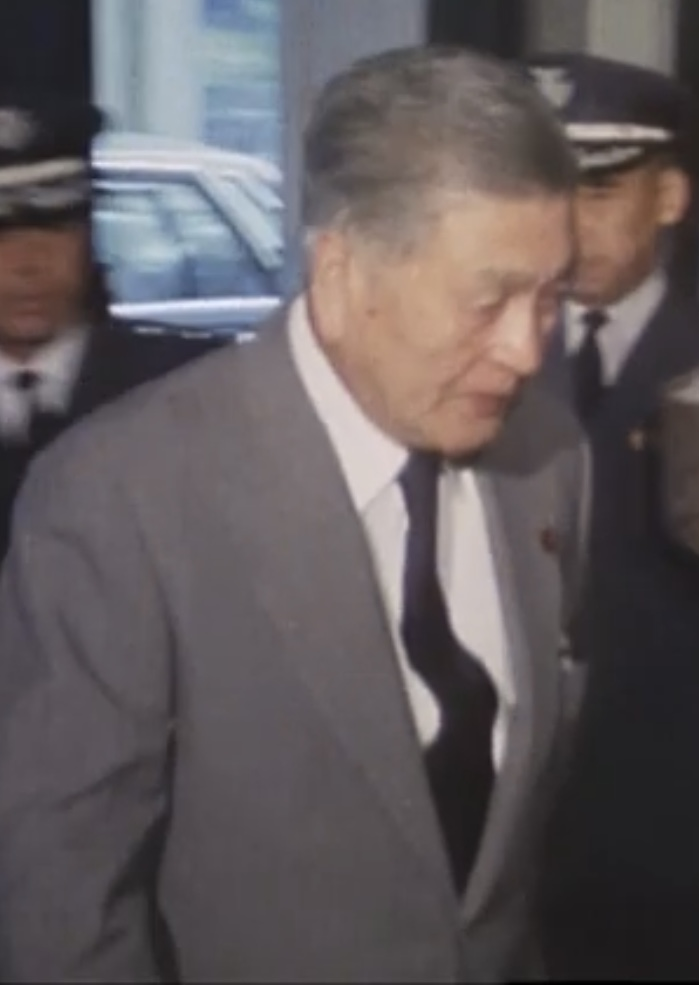

Director-General of the Japan Defense Agency
- In office 24 August 1988 – 3 June 1989
- Prime Minister: Noboru Takeshita
- Preceded by: Tsutomu Kawara
- Succeeded by: Taku Yamasaki

Minister of Agriculture, Forestry and Fisheries
- In office 30 November 1981 – 26 November 1982
- Prime Minister: Zenko Suzuki
- Preceded by: Takao Kameoka
- Succeeded by: Iwazo Kaneko

Director-General of the National Land Agency
- In office 24 December 1976 – 28 November 1977
- Prime Minister: Takeo Fukuda
- Preceded by: Kosei Amano
- Succeeded by: Yoshio Sakurauchi

Member of the House of Representatives
- In office 21 November 1960 – 27 September 1996
- Preceded by: Jūjirō Shimaguchi
- Succeeded by: Constituency abolished
- Constituency: Aomori 2nd

Member of the Aomori Prefectural Assembly
- In office 23 April 1947 – 31 October 1960
- Constituency: Minamitsugaru District

Personal details
- Born: 1 January 1918 Inakadate, Aomori, Japan
- Died: 12 December 2001 (aged 83) Hirosaki, Aomori, Japan
- Party: Liberal Democratic
- Relatives: Bunji Tsushima (father-in-law)
- Education: Waseda University

Kichirō Tazawa (田沢 吉郎, Tazawa Kichirō; 1918 – 12 December 2001) was a Japanese politician. He held different cabinet posts and served as defense minister from 1988 to 1989.

== Early life ==
Tazawa was born in 1918. He was a native of Inakadate, Aomori Prefecture.

== Career ==
Tazawa was a member of the Liberal Democratic Party. He was first elected to the House of Representatives in 1960 and served there until 1996 when he lost his seat in the election. From 24 December 1976 to 28 November 1977 he was the director of national land agency.

He was appointed minister of agriculture, forestry and fisheries on 30 November 1981 in a cabinet reshuffle and succeeded Takeo Kameoka in the post. The cabinet was headed by Prime Minister Zenko Suzuki. Tazawa was in office until 26 November 1982. He was appointed minister of state and director-general of the Japan Defense Agency (today defense minister) on 24 August 1988 to the cabinet led by Prime Minister Noboru Takeshita. He replaced Tsutomu Kawara in the post who had resigned from office. Tazawa retained his post in the late December 1988 reshuffle. He was in office until 3 June 1989 when Taku Yamasaki was appointed to the post. Tazawa retired from politics and was appointed president of Hirosaki Gakuin University. He served in the post until his death in 2001.

== Personal life and death ==
Tazawa's wife managed a large farm in Aomori which is one of the significant agricultural and fishing regions in Japan. Tazawa died of esophagus cancer at a hospital in Hirosaki, Aomori Prefecture, on 12 December 2001.

House of Representatives (Japan)
Preceded by Motosaburo Tokai	Chair, Committee on Rules and Administration of the House of Representatives of Japan; 1971–1972	Succeeded by Toshiki Kaifu
Preceded by Hideyo Sasaki	Chair, Committee on Rules and Administration of the House of Representatives of Japan; 1974–1976	Succeeded by Shin Kanemaru
Political offices
Preceded by Kosei Amano	Head of the National Land Agency; 1976–1977	Succeeded by Yoshio Sakurauchi
Preceded by Takao Kameoka	Minister of Agriculture, Forestry and Fisheries; 1981–1982	Succeeded by Iwazo Kaneko
Preceded by Tsutomu Kawara	Head of the Japan Defense Agency; 1988–1989	Succeeded by Taku Yamasaki
Party political offices
Preceded by Shin Kanemaru	Chair, Diet Affairs Committee of the Liberal Democratic Party of Japan; 1980–1981	Succeeded by Hajime Tamura
