= Yoshinobu Ohira =

Japanese politician (born 1978)

- 大平 喜信

Member of the House of Representatives
- In office 19 December 2014 – 28 September 2017
- Preceded by: Multi-member district
- Succeeded by: Akiko Kamei
- Constituency: Chūgoku PR

Personal details
- Born: 28 February 1978 (age 48) Hiroshima, Japan
- Party: Communist
- Education: Hiroshima University

Yoshinobu Ohira (Japanese: 大平 喜信, Hepburn: Ōhiro Yoshinobu; 28 February 1978) is a member of the Japanese Communist Party serving in the House of Representatives as a representative of the Chūgoku region's proportional block. He is against a reinterpretation of Article 9 of the Japanese Constitution to allow for collective self defence. Ohira is also against nuclear weapons and thinks that the world should cooperate in the goal of eliminating them.
