= Kozaemon Kimura =

Japanese politician (1888–1952)

- 木村 小左衛門
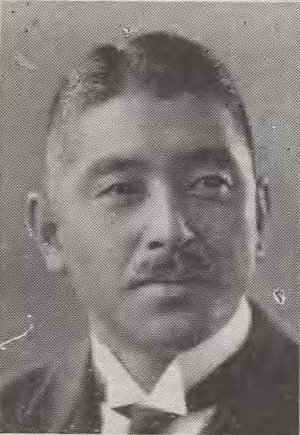

Minister of Home Affairs
- In office 1 June 1947 – 31 December 1947
- Prime Minister: Tetsu Katayama
- Preceded by: Etsujirō Uehara; Tetsu Katayama (acting)
- Succeeded by: Position abolished

Minister of Agriculture and Forestry
- In office 15 February 1947 – 24 May 1947
- Prime Minister: Shigeru Yoshida
- Preceded by: Shigeru Yoshida
- Succeeded by: Tetsu Katayama (acting); Rikizō Hirano

Vice Speaker of the House of Representatives
- In office 22 May 1946 – 15 February 1947
- Speaker: Senzō Higai; Takeshi Yamazaki
- Preceded by: Eikichi Katsuta
- Succeeded by: Tomoharu Inoue

Member of the House of Representatives
- In office 10 April 1946 – 28 August 1952
- Preceded by: Constituency established
- Succeeded by: Yoshio Sakurauchi
- Constituency: Shimane at-large
- In office 10 May 1924 – 31 March 1937
- Preceded by: Hara Fujirō
- Succeeded by: Enzaburō Takahashi
- Constituency: Shimane 3rd (1924–1928); Shimane 1st (1928–1937)

Personal details
- Born: 2 February 1888 Daitō, Shimane, Japan
- Died: 28 February 1952 (aged 64)
- Party: Kaishintō (1952–1954)
- Other political affiliations: Kenseikai (1924–1927); CDP (1927–1940); JPP (1945–1947); DP (1947–1950); NDP (1950–1952)
- Education: Waseda University

Kozaemon Kimura (木村 小左衛門; 1888–1952) was a Japanese businessman and politician who held several cabinet posts. He was one of the long-term members of the House of Representatives. He joined several political parties, including the Democratic Party.

== Biography ==
Kimura was born in the Shimane Prefecture in 1888. He was a graduate of Waseda University. Following graduation he worked at different banks and headed various companies. He served as a secretary to the prime minister, minister of finance and minister of home and also, a parliament counselor. As of 1946 Kimura was the vice speaker of the House of Representatives to which he was first elected in 1924. In 1947 he was appointed minister of agriculture to the cabinet led by Prime Minister Shigeru Yoshida and in June 1947 he was named minister of home affairs to the cabinet led by Prime Minister Tetsu Katayama. In 1949 he was again elected to the House of Representatives and was appointed state minister to the cabinet of Shigeru Yoshida.

Kimura was a member of the Progressive Party. In the late 1940s he became a member of the Democratic Party and part of the faction led by Takeru Inukai. He was the general secretary of the party until 10 June 1947 when he resigned from the post, and Kimura was replaced by Gizo Tomabechi. In 1951 Kimura established and headed a faction within the party which included nine members. During this period he was part of a group in the party called "four emperors". The other members of this group were Takahashi Eikichi, Suzuki Shimpachi and Makino Kansaku. He died in 1952.
