= Akiko Kamei =

Japanese politician (born 1965)

- 亀井 亜紀子
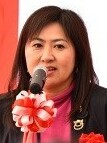
- Kamei in 2017

Member of the House of Representatives
- In office 28 April 2024 – 23 January 2026
- Preceded by: Hiroyuki Hosoda
- Succeeded by: Emiko Takagai
- Constituency: Shimane 1st
- In office 27 October 2017 – 31 October 2021
- Preceded by: Yoshinobu Ohira
- Succeeded by: Multi-member district
- Constituency: Chūgoku PR

Member of the House of Councillors
- In office 29 July 2007 – 28 July 2013
- Preceded by: Shuntarō Kageyama
- Succeeded by: Saburō Shimada
- Constituency: Shimane at-large

Personal details
- Born: 14 May 1965 (age 61) Meguro, Tokyo, Japan
- Party: CRA (since 2026)
- Other political affiliations: PNP (2007–2012); Independent (2012); Green Wind (2012–2013); DP (2016–2017); CRA (2017–2026)
- Parent: Hisaoki Kamei (father)
- Education: Gakushuin University; Carleton University
- Website: Official website

Akiko Kamei (亀井 亜紀子, Kamei Akiko; born 14 May 1965) is a Japanese politician of the Constitutional Democratic Party of Japan, and a former member of the House of Representatives. She is also a former member of People's New Party and of the House of Councillors. A native of Tokyo and graduate of Gakushuin University and Carleton University, she was elected for the first time in 2007 in the Shimane at-large district. Her father Hisaoki Kamei was a veteran member of the House of Representatives. She is married.

Kamei contested the Shimane 1st district in 2017 election. While she lost against the longtime incumbent Hiroyuki Hosoda in the race, she received enough votes to be elected through the PR block.
