= Shoji Nishida (House of Representatives) =

Japanese politician (born 1969)

- 西田 昭二
- Official portrait, 2022

Member of the House of Representatives; from Hokuriku-Shin'etsu
- Incumbent
- Assumed office 22 October 2017
- Preceded by: Shigeo Kitamura
- Constituency: Ishikawa 3rd (2017–2024); PR block (2024–2026); Ishikawa 3rd (2026–present)

Member of the Ishikawa Prefectural Assembly
- In office 30 April 2007 – 28 September 2017
- Constituency: Nanao City

Member of the Nanao City Council
- In office 2001–2007

Personal details
- Born: 1 May 1969 (age 57) Nanao, Ishikawa, Japan
- Party: Liberal Democratic
- Education: Aichi Gakuin University

Shoji Nishida (西田昭二, Nishida Shoji; born 1 May 1969) is a Japanese politician serving as a member of the House of Representatives since 2017. From 2007 to 2017, he was a member of the Ishikawa Prefectural Assembly.
