= Ishikawa 3rd district =

Legislative district of Japan

- Parliamentary constituency for the Japanese House of Representatives
- Numbered map of Ishikawa Prefecture single-member districts
- Prefecture: Ishikawa
- Proportional District: Hokuriku-Shinetsu
- Electorate: 224,873

Current constituency
- Created: 1994
- Seats: One
- Party: LDP
- Representative: Shoji Nishida
- Municipalities: Hakui, Kahoku, Nanao, Suzu, and Wajima, Hakui District, Hōsu District, Kahoku District, and Kashima District.

Ishikawa 3rd district (石川県第3区, Ishikawa-ken dai-sanku or simply 石川3区, Ishikawa sanku) is a single-member constituency of the House of Representatives in the national Diet of Japan located in Ishikawa Prefecture.

== Areas covered ==
=== since 2013 ===
- Hakui
- Kahoku
- Nanao
- Suzu
- Wajima
- Hakui District
- Hōsu District
- Kahoku District
- Kashima District

=== 1994 - 2013 ===
- Hakui
- Nanao
- Suzu
- Wajima
- Hakui District
- Kahoku District
- Kashima District
- Suzu District
- Fugeshi District

== List of representatives ==
Election	Representative	Party	Notes
1996	Tsutomu Kawara	Liberal Democratic	
2000	Tsutomu Kawara	Liberal Democratic	
2003	Tsutomu Kawara	Liberal Democratic	
2005	Shigeo Kitamura	Liberal Democratic	
2009	Kazuya Kondo	Democratic	
2012	Shigeo Kitamura	Liberal Democratic	
2014	Shigeo Kitamura	Liberal Democratic	
2017	Shoji Nishida	Liberal Democratic	
2021	Shoji Nishida	Liberal Democratic	
2024	Kazuya Kondo	Constitutional Democratic	
2026	Shoji Nishida	Liberal Democratic	

== Election results ==
=== 2026 ===
2026
Party	Candidate	Votes	%	±%
LDP	Shōji Nishida	73,034	51.9	▲8.7
Centrist Reform	Kazuya Kondo (elected in PR block)	64,893	46.1	▼8.3
JCP	Shōji Minami	2,850	2.0	▲0.4
Registered electors		224,873		
Turnout		140,777	63.54	▲1.04
LDP gain from Centrist Reform				

=== 2024 ===
2024
Party	Candidate	Votes	%	±%
CDP	Kazuya Kondo	77,247	54.4	
LDP	Shōji Nishida (elected in PR block)	61,308	43.2	
JCP	Shōji Minami	3,438	2.4	
Registered electors		230,800		
Turnout			62.50	▼3.59
CDP gain from LDP				

=== 2021 ===
2021
Party	Candidate	Votes	%	±%
Liberal Democratic (endorsed by Komeito)	Shoji Nishida (incumbent)	80,692	50.74	
CDP (endorsed by SDP)	Kazuya Kondo (PR seat incumbent) (won PR seat)	76,747	48.26	New
Independent	Manami Sato	1,588	1.00	New
Majority		3,945	2.48	
Registered electors		243,618		
Turnout			66.09	▲0.77
LDP hold				

=== 2017 ===
2017
Party	Candidate	Votes	%	±%
Liberal Democratic (endorsed by Komeito)	Shoji Nishida	80,416	49.05	
Kibō no Tō	Kazuya Kondo (won PR seat)	78,306	47.77	New
Communist	Kōta Suzuki	5,212	3.18	
Majority		2,110	1.28	
Registered electors		255,051		
Turnout			65.32	▲8.02
LDP hold				

=== 2014 ===
2014
Party	Candidate	Votes	%	±%
Liberal Democratic (endorsed by Komeito)	Shigeo Kitamura (incumbent)	71,384	49.56	
Democratic	Kazuya Kondo	64,940	45.08	
Communist	Yūko Watanabe	7,726	5.36	
Majority		6,444	4.48	
Registered electors		256,406		
Turnout			57.30	▼7.45
LDP hold				

=== 2012 ===
2012
Party	Candidate	Votes	%	±%
Liberal Democratic (endorsed by Komeito)	Shigeo Kitamura (PR seat incumbent)	89,266	54.45	
Democratic (endorsed by PNP)	Kazuya Kondo (incumbent)	62,543	38.15	
Communist	Yūko Watanabe	12,147	7.41	N/A
Majority		26,723	16.30	
Registered electors		260,929		
Turnout			64.75	▼11.91
LDP gain from Democratic				

=== 2009 ===
2009
Party	Candidate	Votes	%	±%
Democratic (endorsed by PNP)	Kazuya Kondo	100,832	49.85	
Liberal Democratic (endorsed by Komeito)	Shigeo Kitamura (incumbent) (won PR seat)	98,799	48.84	
Happiness Realization	Yoshikazu Higashi	2,654	1.31	New
Majority		2,033	1.01	
Registered electors		268,230		
Turnout			76.66	▲4.42
Democratic gain from LDP				

=== 2005 ===
2005
Party	Candidate	Votes	%	±%
Liberal Democratic (endorsed by Komeito)	Shigeo Kitamura	116,215	60.00	
Democratic (endorsed by SDP)	Yutaka Kuwabara	77,463	40.00	
Majority		38,752	20.00	
Registered electors		275,961		
Turnout			72.24	▲7.05
LDP hold				

=== 2003 ===
2003
Party	Candidate	Votes	%	±%
Liberal Democratic	Tsutomu Kawara (incumbent)	102,864	58.09	
Democratic	Yutaka Kuwabara (PR seat incumbent)	66,240	37.41	
Communist	Hiroshi Sakamoto	7,972	4.50	
Majority		36,624	20.68	
Registered electors		278,157		
Turnout			65.19	▼3.15
LDP hold				

=== 2000 ===
2000
Party	Candidate	Votes	%	±%
Liberal Democratic	Tsutomu Kawara (incumbent)	133,667	72.39	
Democratic	Kenzaburo Ikeda	39,687	21.49	New
Communist	Hiroshi Sakamoto	8,176	4.43	
Liberal League	Hideyuki Tanebe	3,123	1.69	New
Majority		93,980	50.90	
Turnout			68.34	▼6.24
LDP hold				

=== 1996 ===
1996
Party	Candidate	Votes	%	±%
Liberal Democratic	Tsutomu Kawara	92,820	45.45	New
Independent	Tomiro Yata	90,798	44.46	New
Democratic	Masanori Kaginushi	14,129	6.92	New
Communist	Kosaku Furukawa	6,471	3.17	New
Majority		2,022	0.99	
Registered electors		279,420		
Turnout			74.58	
LDP win (new seat)				
