= Kazuyoshi Kaneko =

Japanese politician

- 金子 一義
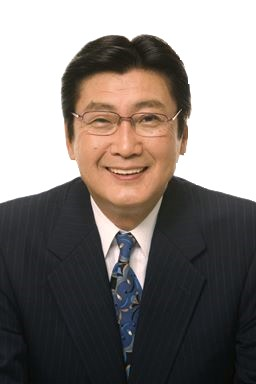
- Official portrait, 2008

Minister of Land, Infrastructure, Transport and Tourism
- In office 29 September 2008 – 16 September 2009
- Prime Minister: Tarō Asō
- Preceded by: Nariaki Nakayama
- Succeeded by: Seiji Maehara

Minister of State for Regulatory Reform
- In office 22 September 2003 – 27 September 2004
- Prime Minister: Junichiro Koizumi
- Preceded by: Nobuteru Ishihara
- Succeeded by: Seiichiro Murakami

Member of the House of Representatives
- In office 6 July 1986 – 28 September 2017
- Preceded by: Ippei Kaneko
- Succeeded by: Shunpei Kaneko
- Constituency: Gifu 2nd (1986–1996); Tōkai PR (1996–2000); Gifu 4th (2000–2003); Tōkai PR (2003–2005); Gifu 4th (2005–2017)

Personal details
- Born: 20 December 1942 Takayama, Gifu, Japan
- Party: Liberal Democratic
- Children: Shunpei Kaneko
- Parent: Ippei Kaneko (father)
- Education: Keio University

Kazuyoshi Kaneko (金子 一義, Kaneko Kazuyoshi; born 20 December 1942) is a Japanese politician of the Liberal Democratic Party and a member of the House of Representatives in the Diet (national legislature).

== Early life ==
A native of Takayama, Gifu and graduate of Keio University, his father is former minister of finance, Ippei Kaneko.

== Career ==
Kaneko was elected to the Diet for the first time in 1986. In September 2008 he was appointed Ministry of Land, Infrastructure, Transport and Tourism and succeeded Nariaki Nakayama in the post.

Political offices
Preceded by Nariaki Nakayama	Minister of Land Infrastructure, Transport and Tourism of Japan; 2008–2009	Succeeded by Seiji Maehara
Preceded by Nobuteru Ishihara	Minister of State for Regulatory Reform of Japan; 2003–2004	Succeeded by Seiichiro Murakami
