= Shigeo Kitamura =

Japanese politician

- 北村 茂男
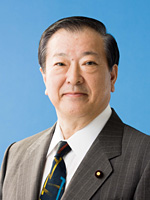
- Official portrait, 2012

Member of the House of Representatives; from Hokuriku-Shin'etsu
- In office 11 September 2005 – 28 September 2017
- Preceded by: Riki Kawara
- Succeeded by: Shoji Nishida
- Constituency: Ishikawa 3rd (2005–2009); PR block (2009–2012); Ishikawa 3rd (2012–2017)

Speaker of the Ishikawa Prefectural Assembly
- In office 9 September 1994 – 29 April 1995

Member of the Ishikawa Prefectural Assembly
- In office 30 April 1983 – 25 August 2005
- Constituency: Wajima City
- In office 30 April 1975 – 29 April 1979
- Constituency: Wajima City

Personal details
- Born: 8 November 1945 (age 80) Wajima, Ishikawa, Japan
- Party: Liberal Democratic
- Relatives: Takuo Komori (son-in-law)
- Education: Meiji University

Shigeo Kitamura (北村 茂男, Kitamura Shigeo; born 8 November 1945) is a retired Japanese politician of the Liberal Democratic Party, who served as a member of the House of Representatives in the Diet (national legislature).

== Political career ==
A native of Wajima, Ishikawa and graduate of Meiji University, Kitamura was elected to the House of Representatives for the first time in 2005 after having served in the assembly of Ishikawa Prefecture for seven terms since 1975.

His profile on the LDP website:

- Member, Ishikawa Prefectural Assembly
- Deputy Chairman, General Council of LDP
- Deputy Chairman, Diet Affairs Committee of LDP
- Acting Director, Cabinet Division of LDP
- Chairman, Committee on Organizations Involved with NPO and NGO of LDP
- Parliamentary Secretary of Internal Affairs and Communications
- Parliamentary Secretary of Cabinet Office
- Member of Japan-US Parliamentary Association, Japan-South Korea Parliamentary Association, Japan-Taiwan Parliamentary Commission

== Positions ==
A member of the Diet groups affiliated to the openly revisionist lobby Nippon Kaigi, and to the fundamentalist league Shintō Seiji Renmei, Kitamura is in favor of the revision of the Constitution, of the right to collective-self-defense, of the change from a bicameral to a unicameral legislative system, of nuclear power plants, of relocating the US base in Okinawa, and against the participation of Japan to the Trans-Pacific Partnership, and against a nuclear-armed Japan
