= Ippei Kaneko =

Japanese politician (1913–1989)

- 金子 一平
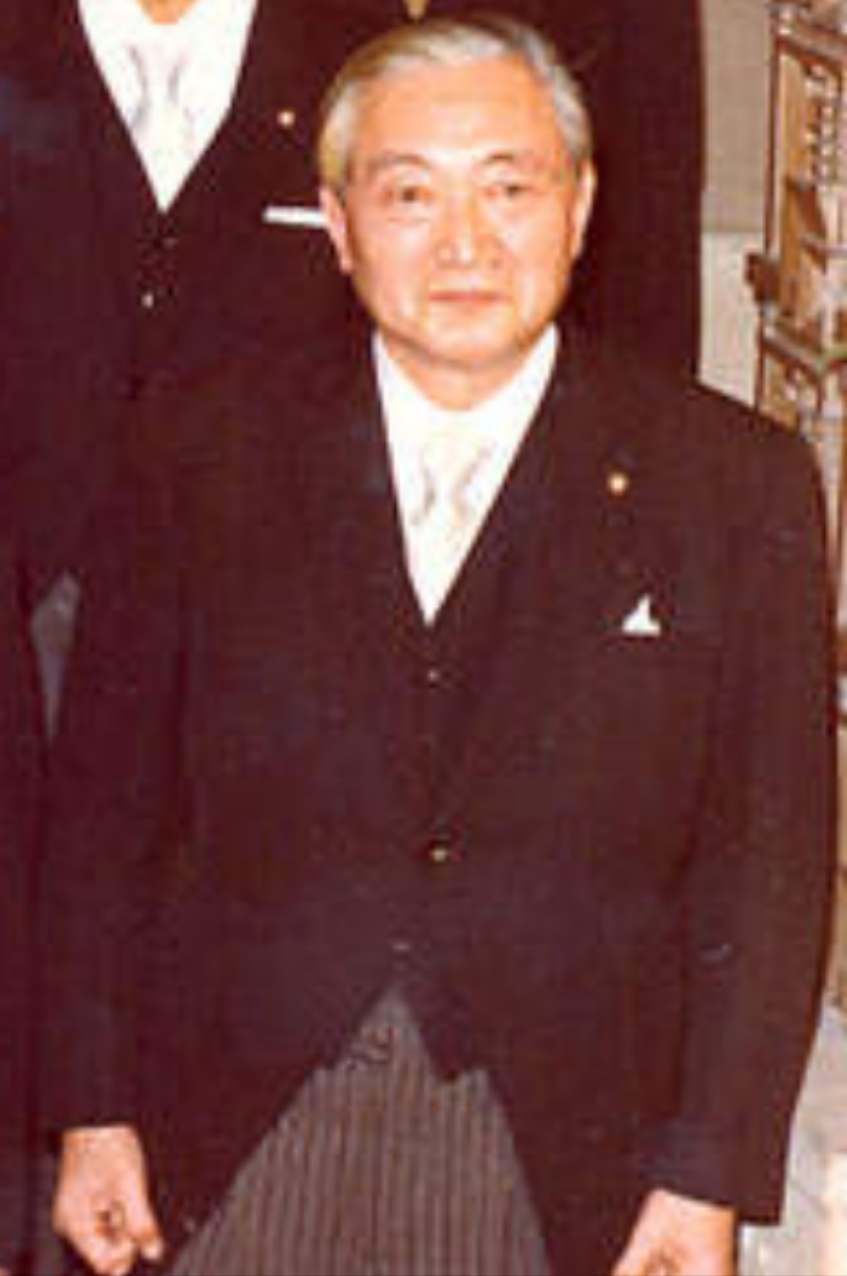
- Kaneko in 1978

Director-General of the Economic Planning Agency
- In office 1 November 1984 – 28 December 1985
- Prime Minister: Yasuhiro Nakasone
- Preceded by: Toshio Kōmoto
- Succeeded by: Wataru Hiraizumi

Minister of Finance
- In office 8 December 1978 – 8 November 1979
- Prime Minister: Masayoshi Ōhira
- Preceded by: Tatsuo Murayama
- Succeeded by: Noboru Takeshita

Member of the House of Representatives
- In office 21 November 1960 – 8 June 1986
- Preceded by: Ryōzō Katō
- Succeeded by: Kazuyoshi Kaneko
- Constituency: Gifu 2nd

Personal details
- Born: 12 February 1913 Takayama, Gifu, Japan
- Died: 28 March 1989 (aged 76) Tokyo, Japan
- Party: Liberal Democratic
- Children: Kazuyoshi Kaneko
- Relatives: Shunpei Kaneko (grandson)
- Education: Tokyo Imperial University

Ippei Kaneko (金子 一平, Kaneko Ippei; 12 February 1913 – 28 March 1989) was a Japanese politician. He served as finance minister of Japan from 1978 to 1979.

== Career ==
Kaneko was a member of the Liberal Democratic Party (LDP) and part of the Ikeda faction led by Hayato Ikeda. Kaneko was the chairman of the LDP's tax system research council. He ran for Diet seat in the 1960 general election as a member of the Ikeda faction.

He worked at the ministry of finance as bureaucrat and had experience on tax policy. He served as the head of the Osaka Tax Bureau until 1978.

He was appointed minister of finance in the Masayoshi Ōhira's cabinet on 8 December 1978, replacing Tatsuo Murayama in the post. Kaneko was in office until 8 November 1979. He was part of the faction led by Masayoshi Ohira in the LDP during this period. Then Kaneko served as the director of the Economic Planning Agency (EPA) in the mid-1980s.

== Personal life ==
Kaneko's eldest son Kazuyoshi Kaneko is also a politician and held different cabinet portfolios, including transport minister.

House of Representatives (Japan)
Preceded by Kunikichi Saito	Chair, Finance Committee of the House of Representatives of Japan; 1972	Succeeded by Soichi Kamoda
Political offices
Preceded by Tatsuo Murayama	Minister of Finance; 1978–1979	Succeeded by Noboru Takeshita
Preceded by Toshio Komoto	Head of the Economic Planning Agency; 1984–1985	Succeeded by Wataru Hiraizumi
