= Keigo Masuya =

Japanese politician

- 桝屋 敬悟
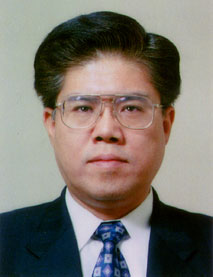

Member of the House of Representatives
- In office 21 December 2012 – 14 October 2021
- Constituency: Chūgoku PR
- In office 19 July 1993 – 21 July 2009
- Preceded by: Mitsuteru Yoshii
- Succeeded by: Multi-member district
- Constituency: Yamaguchi 2nd (1993–1996); Chūgoku PR (1996–2009)

Personal details
- Born: 3 April 1951 (age 75) Yamaguchi City, Yamaguchi, Japan
- Party: Komeito
- Other political affiliations: CGP (1993–1994); NFP (1994–1998)
- Education: Sōka University

Keigo Masuya (桝屋 敬悟, Masuya Keigo; born 3 April 1951) is a former Japanese politician of the New Komeito Party, a member of the House of Representatives in the Diet (national legislature). A native of Abu District, Yamaguchi and graduate of the Soka University, he worked at the government of Yamaguchi Prefecture from 1975 to 1992. He was elected to the House of Representatives for the first time in 1993.
