= Hisaoki Kamei =

Japanese politician (born 1939)

- 亀井 久興
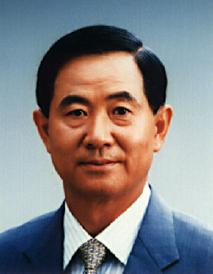
- Official portrait, 1997

Director-General of the National Land Agency
- In office 11 September 1997 – 30 July 1998
- Prime Minister: Ryutaro Hashimoto
- Preceded by: Kosuke Ito
- Succeeded by: Hakuo Yanagisawa

Member of the House of Representatives
- In office 21 October 1996 – 21 July 2009
- Preceded by: Constituency established
- Succeeded by: Multi-member district
- Constituency: Shimane 3rd (1996–2003); Chūgoku PR (2003–2009)
- In office 19 February 1990 – 18 June 1993
- Preceded by: Yoneji Yoshihara
- Succeeded by: Atsushi Nishikōri
- Constituency: Shimane at-large

Members of the House of Councillors
- In office 8 July 1974 – 21 June 1986
- Preceded by: Toshinaga Yamamoto
- Succeeded by: Mikio Aoki
- Constituency: Shimane at-large

Personal details
- Born: 8 November 1939 (age 86) Shibuya, Tokyo, Japan
- Party: People's New Party (2005–2012)
- Other political affiliations: LDP (1974–2005)
- Children: Akiko Kamei
- Education: Gakushuin University

Hisaoki Kamei (亀井 久興, Kamei Hisaoki; born 8 November 1939) is a former Japanese politician of the now defunct People's New Party and was a member of the House of Representatives in the Diet (national legislature). A native of Kanoashi District, Shimane and graduate of Gakushuin University, he ran unsuccessfully for the House of Representatives in 1971 as an independent. He ran again three years later as a member of the Liberal Democratic Party and was elected for the first time.

His daughter Akiko Kamei is also a politician.
