= Tatsuo Murayama =

Japanese politician (1915–2010)

- 村山 達雄

Minister of Finance
- In office 27 December 1988 – 9 August 1989
- Prime Minister: Noboru Takeshita Sōsuke Uno
- Preceded by: Kiichi Miyazawa; Noboru Takeshita (acting)
- Succeeded by: Ryutaro Hashimoto
- In office 28 November 1977 – 8 December 1978
- Prime Minister: Takeo Fukuda Masayoshi Ōhira
- Preceded by: Hideo Bo
- Succeeded by: Ippei Kaneko

Minister of Health and Welfare
- In office 18 May 1981 – 30 November 1981
- Prime Minister: Zenkō Suzuki
- Preceded by: Sunao Sonoda
- Succeeded by: Motoharu Morishita

Member of the House of Representatives; from Hokuriku-Shin'etsu
- In office 22 November 1963 – 2 June 2000
- Preceded by: Ichirō Ōno
- Succeeded by: Multi-member district
- Constituency: Niigata 3rd (1963–1996); PR block (1996–2000)

Personal details
- Born: 8 February 1915 Nagaoka, Niigata, Japan
- Died: 20 May 2010 (aged 95) Tokyo, Japan
- Party: Liberal Democratic
- Education: Tokyo Imperial University

Tatsuo Murayama (村山 達雄, Murayama Tatsuo; 8 February 1915 – 20 May 2010) was a Japanese politician who was a member of the Liberal Democratic Party (LDP) and finance minister for two times.

== Early life ==
Tatsuo Murayama was born in 1915.

== Career ==
Murayama was a tax expert and helped the development of the tax overhaul bills. He worked in the ministry of finance as a bureaucrat and was the general director of the tax bureau.

Then he joined the LDP and served as finance minister twice. Murayama replaced Hideo Bo as finance minister on 28 November 1977. Murayama's successor was Ippei Kaneko who was appointed on 8 December 1978. In the 1979 general elections, he won a seat in the Niigata constituency's second district. He served as the chairman of the LDP's tax system research council. He also led a fiscal expansion research committee of the party which later called the Murayama committee. He was part of the Suzuki and then Miyazawa faction within the LDP.

The second term of Murayama as finance minister was from 27 December 1988 to 9 August 1989 in the cabinet of Prime Minister Noboru Takeshita. He replaced Noboru Takeshita, who had served as acting finance minister since the resignation of Kiichi Miyazawa due to his alleged involvement in the Recruit stock scandal on 9 December 1988. On 9 August 1989, Ryutaro Hashimoto replaced Murayama as finance minister.

In the 1993 elections Murayama was elected to the lower house winning a seat from the Niigata constituency's third district. He was not included in the LDP's proportional representation list for the 25 June 2000 general elections, and he retired from the politics.

== Death ==
Murayama died on 20 May 2010 at the age of 95.

Political offices
Preceded by Hideo Bo	Minister of Finance; 1977–1978	Succeeded by Ippei Kaneko
Preceded by Sunao Sonoda	Minister of Health and Welfare; 1981	Succeeded by Motoharu Morishita
Preceded by Noboru Takeshita	Minister of Finance; 1988–1989	Succeeded by Ryutaro Hashimoto
