= Hiroyuki Hosoda =

Japanese politician (1944–2023)

- 細田 博之
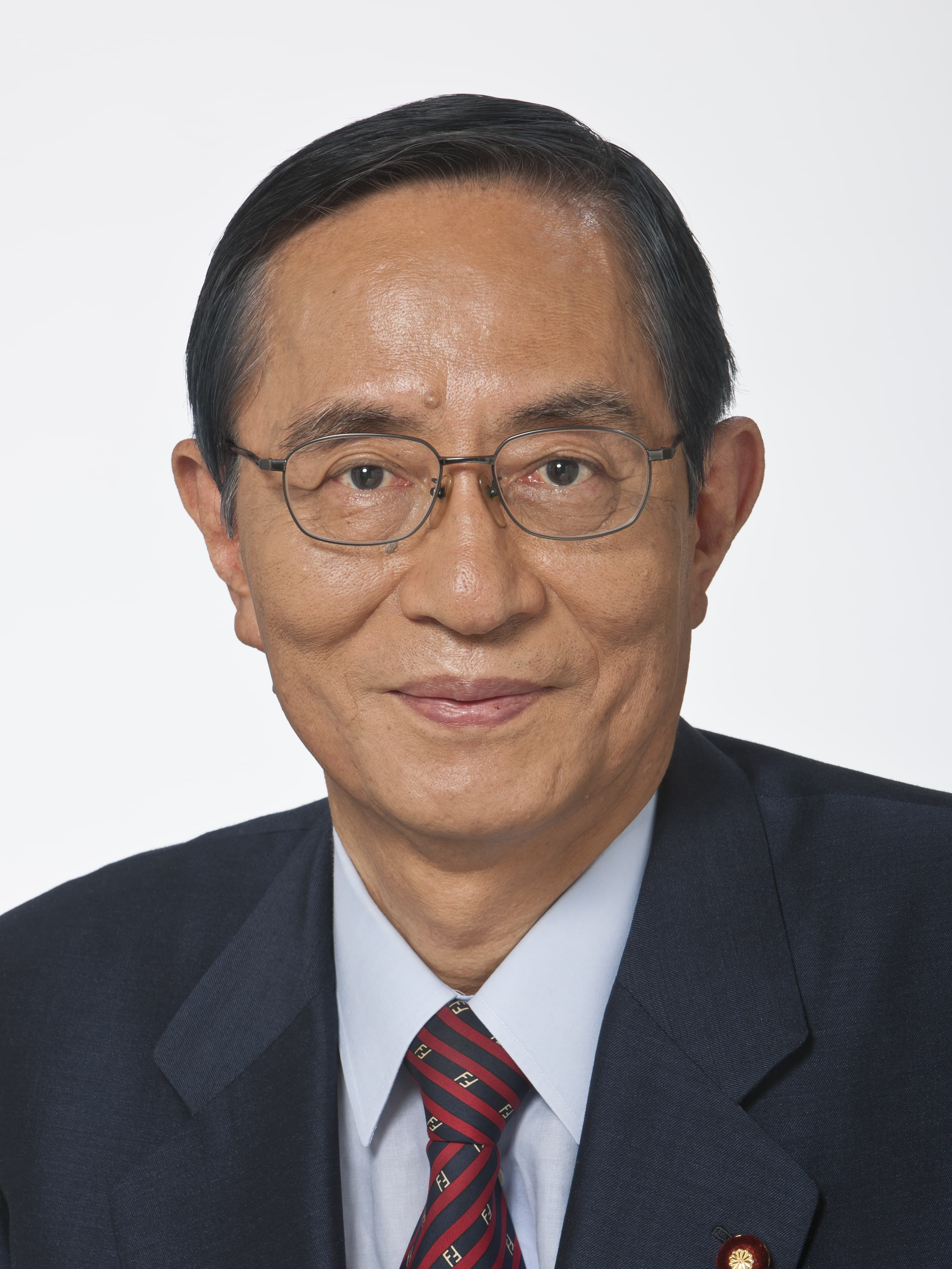
- Official portrait, 2012

Speaker of the House of Representatives
- In office 10 November 2021 – 20 October 2023
- Monarch: Naruhito
- Deputy: Banri Kaieda
- Preceded by: Tadamori Ōshima
- Succeeded by: Fukushiro Nukaga

Secretary-General of the Liberal Democratic Party
- In office 22 September 2008 – 29 September 2009
- President: Tarō Asō
- Preceded by: Tarō Asō
- Succeeded by: Tadamori Oshima

Chief Cabinet Secretary
- In office 7 May 2004 – 31 October 2005
- Prime Minister: Junichiro Koizumi
- Preceded by: Yasuo Fukuda
- Succeeded by: Shinzo Abe

Deputy Chief Cabinet Secretary (Political affairs, House of Representatives)
- In office 22 September 2003 – 7 May 2004
- Prime Minister: Junichiro Koizumi
- Preceded by: Shinzo Abe
- Succeeded by: Seiken Sugiura

Member of the House of Representatives
- In office 18 February 1990 – 10 November 2023
- Preceded by: Kichizō Hosoda
- Succeeded by: Akiko Kamei
- Constituency: Shimane at-large (1990–1996); Shimane 1st (1996–2023)

Personal details
- Born: 5 April 1944 Matsue, Shimane, Japan
- Died: 10 November 2023 (aged 79) Tokyo, Japan
- Party: Liberal Democratic
- Parent: Kichizō Hosoda (father)
- Education: University of Tokyo

Hiroyuki Hosoda (細田 博之, Hosoda Hiroyuki; 5 April 1944 – 10 November 2023) was a Japanese politician who served as the speaker of the House of Representatives of Japan from November 2021 to October 2023. He was a member of the House of Representatives from 1990, and served as Chief Cabinet Secretary in Junichiro Koizumi's cabinet from 2004 to 2005, and as Secretary-General of the Liberal Democratic Party from 2008 to 2009.

== Early life ==
Hiroyuki Hosoda was born in Matsue, Shimane Prefecture on 5 April 1944. He graduated from the law faculty of the University of Tokyo, and worked at the Ministry of International Trade and Industry from 1967 to 1986, serving as Director of the Washington Office of Japan National Oil Corporation from 1983 to 1985, and as Director of the Price Policy Division in the Industrial Policy Bureau from 1985 to 1986.

Hosoda enjoyed playing contract bridge.

== Political career ==
Hosoda left government service in 1986 to become a secretary to his father, Kichizō Hosoda (1912–2007), who was then a member of the House of Representatives. He was elected to the House of Representatives for the first time in the 1990 general election, representing the Shimane Prefecture at-large district, which had previously been his father's constituency.

=== Koizumi government ===
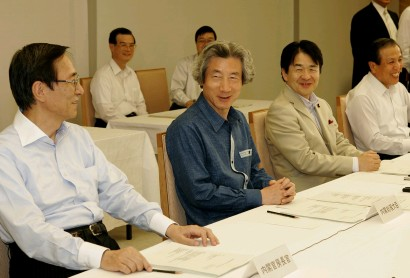
Hosoda with then-Japanese Prime Minister Junichiro Koizumi, Heizo Takenaka, and others in June 2005

Prime Minister Junichiro Koizumi appointed Hosoda to the Cabinet posts of Minister of State for Okinawa and Northern Territories Affairs, Minister of State for Science and Technology Policy, and Minister of State for IT Policy in 2002. Hosoda became Deputy Chief Cabinet Secretary in September 2003, and was promoted to Chief Cabinet Secretary and Minister of State for Gender Equality following Yasuo Fukuda's resignation in May 2004.

=== Aso government ===
After Tarō Asō was elected to the LDP presidency and became Prime Minister, Hosoda was appointed Secretary-General of the LDP. He served in this post from September 2008 to September 2009, when he resigned following the party's historic defeat in the 2009 general election.

=== Abe government ===
Following Shinzo Abe's victory in the 2012 LDP presidential election, Abe appointed Hosoda to head the Seiwa Seisaku Kenkyukai (Seiwa-kai), the largest faction in the party, replacing Nobutaka Machimura. The faction is now commonly known as the "Hosoda faction".

Hosoda briefly served as Acting LDP Secretary-General following Sadakazu Tanigaki's hospitalization for a spinal cord injury in July 2016. In August 2016, Hosoda was appointed Chairman of the LDP General Council.

Hosoda chaired the LDP's 2018 task force on reforming the Constitution of Japan, drawing up a four-point revision proposal in March 2018 that included an amendment to Article 9 to make explicit reference to the Self-Defense Forces. Abe named Hosoda as head of the LDP Headquarters for the Promotion of Revision of the Constitution in September 2019, replacing Hakubun Shimomura, who was viewed as more "dogmatic" than Hosoda and had antagonized opposition parties.

Hosoda was a member of the LDP Parliamentary Group on the Promotion and Conservation of Japanese Sword and Ironwork Culture, which supported subsidies for Tatara steel.

=== Kishida government ===
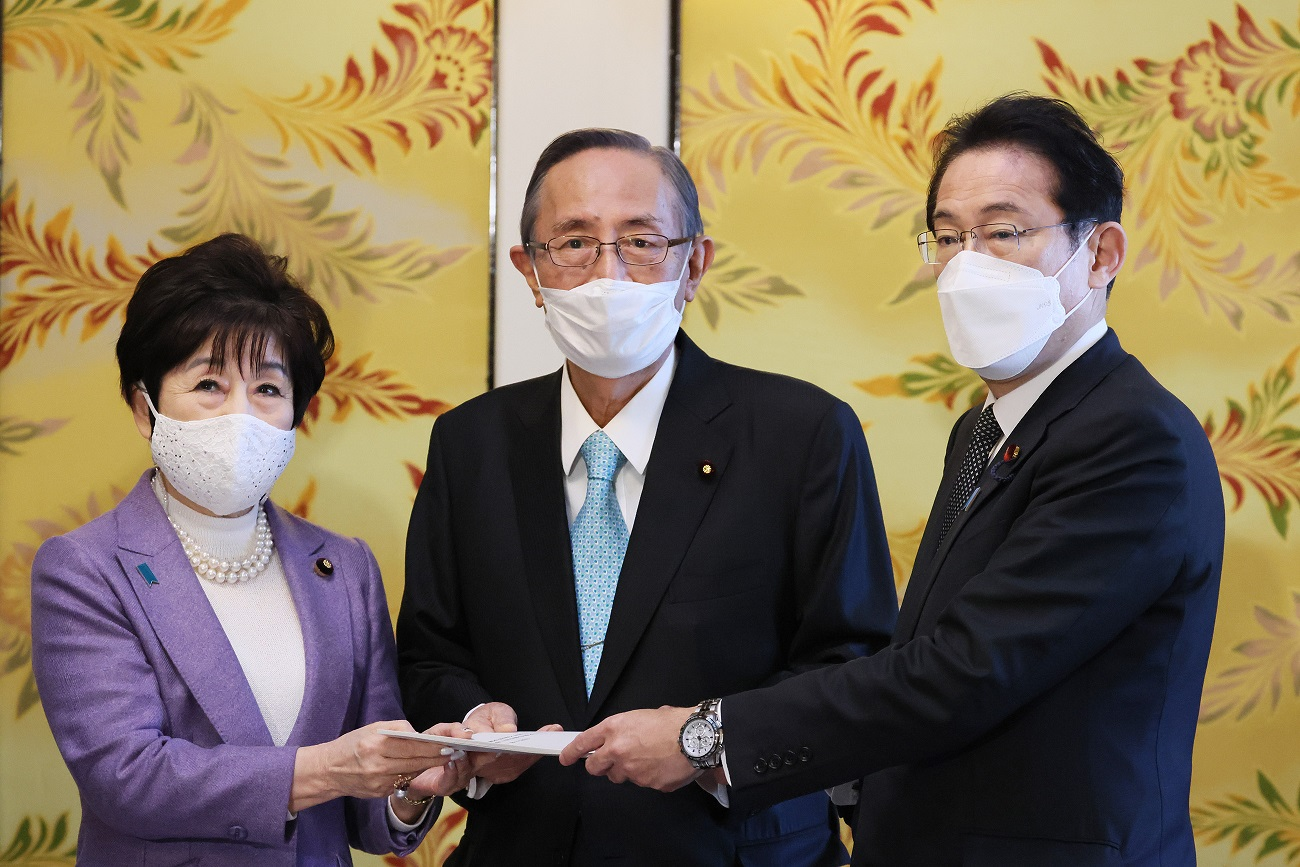
Hosoda with Akiko Santō (left) and Japanese Prime Minister Fumio Kishida (right) in January 2022

After the 2021 Japanese general election, Hosoda, at 77 years old, was elected as Speaker of the Lower House. After he was twice hospitalized over the summer months in 2023, Hosoda stepped down as the Lower House Speaker due to health problems. The House of Representatives accepted the resignation and Fukushiro Nukaga was elected on 20 October to take over as Hosoda's replacement.

== Death ==
On 10 November 2023, Hosoda died of multiple organ failure at the hospital in Tokyo, at the age of 79, just one month after he resigned from the House of Representatives. After stepping down as chairman, Hosoda was reportedly hospitalized and absent from plenary sessions, but says that his condition suddenly deteriorated the day before his death.

House of Representatives (Japan)
Preceded by Ichiro Aisawa	Chairman of the Deliberative Council on Political Ethics; 2018–2020	Succeeded by Eisuke Mori
Preceded by Tsutomu Sato	Chairman of the Commission on the Constitution; 2020–2021	Succeeded by Eisuke Mori
Preceded by Tadamori Ōshima	Speaker of the House of Representatives of Japan; 2021–2023	Succeeded by Fukushiro Nukaga
Political offices
Preceded by Koji Omi	Minister of State for Science and Technology Policy; 2002–2003	Succeeded by Toshimitsu Motegi
Preceded by Koji Omi	Minister of State for Okinawa and Northern Territories Affairs; 2002–2003	Succeeded by Toshimitsu Motegi
Preceded by Shinzō Abe	Deputy Chief Cabinet Secretary (Political affairs - House of Representatives); 2003–2004	Succeeded by Seiken Sugiura
Preceded by Yasuo Fukuda	Chief Cabinet Secretary; 2004–2005	Succeeded by Shinzō Abe
Party political offices
Preceded by Hidenao Nakagawa	Chairman of the Diet Affairs Committee, Liberal Democratic Party; 2005-2006	Succeeded by Toshihiro Nikai
Preceded by Nobuteru Ishihara	Acting Secretary General, Liberal Democratic Party; 2007–2008	Succeeded by Nobuteru Ishihara
Preceded by Taro Aso	Secretary General of the Liberal Democratic Party; 2008–2009	Succeeded by Tadamori Oshima
Preceded by Ryu Shionoya	Chairman of the General Council, Liberal Democratic Party; 2012	Succeeded by Seiko Noda
Preceded by Yoshihide Suga	Executive Acting Secretary General, Liberal Democratic Party; 2012-2016	Succeeded by Hakubun Shimomura
Preceded by Toshihiro Nikai	Chairman of the General Council, Liberal Democratic Party; 2016-2017	Succeeded by Wataru Takeshita
