= Yoshio Sakurauchi =

Japanese politician (1912–2003)

- 櫻内 義雄
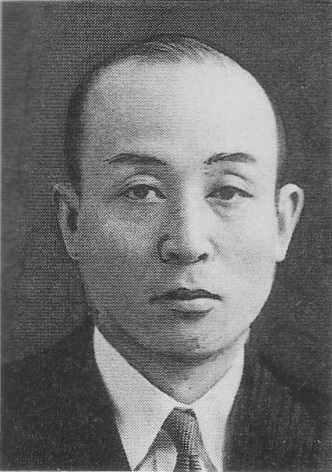
- Sakurauchi in 1950

Speaker of the House of Representatives
- In office 27 February 1990 – 18 June 1993
- Monarch: Akihito
- Deputy: Kiichi Murayama
- Preceded by: Hajime Tamura
- Succeeded by: Takako Doi
Ministerial offices
Minister of Foreign Affairs
In office 30 November 1981 – 27 November 1982
Prime Minister	Zenkō Suzuki
Preceded by	Sunao Sonoda
Succeeded by	Shintaro Abe
Minister of Construction
In office 28 November 1977 – 7 December 1978
Prime Minister	Takeo Fukuda
Preceded by	Shiro Hasegawa
Succeeded by	Motosaburo Tokai
Director-General of the National Land Agency
In office 28 November 1977 – 7 December 1978
Prime Minister	Takeo Fukuda
Preceded by	Kichirō Tazawa
Succeeded by	Shiro Nakano
Minister of Agriculture and Forestry
In office 22 December 1972 – 25 November 1973
Prime Minister	Kakuei Tanaka
Preceded by	Tokuro Adachi
Succeeded by	Tadao Kuraishi
Minister of International Trade and Industry
In office 18 July 1964 – 3 June 1965
Prime Minister	Hayato Ikeda; Eisaku Satō
Preceded by	Hajime Fukuda
Succeeded by	Takeo Miki
Party political offices
Secretary-General of the Liberal Democratic Party
In office November 1979 – November 1981
President	Masayoshi Ōhira; Eiichi Nishimura (acting); Zenkō Suzuki
Vice President	Eiichi Nishimura (1979–1980)
Preceded by	Kunikichi Saitō
Succeeded by	Susumu Nikaidō

Member of the House of Representatives
- In office 2 October 1952 – 2 June 2000
- Preceded by: Kozaemon Kimura
- Succeeded by: Multi-member district
- Constituency: Shimane at-large (1952–1996); Chūgoku PR (1996–2000)
- In office 25 April 1947 – 23 December 1948
- Preceded by: Constituency established
- Succeeded by: Mitsuji Ide
- Constituency: Tokyo 1st

Member of the House of Councillors
- In office 5 June 1950 – December 1951
- Preceded by: Noboru Utsunomiya
- Succeeded by: Akira Kodaki
- Constituency: Shimane at-large

Personal details
- Born: 8 May 1912 Tokyo, Japan
- Died: 5 July 2003 (aged 91) Shibuya, Tokyo, Japan
- Party: Liberal Democratic (after 1955)
- Other political affiliations: DP (1947–1950); NDP (1950–1952); Kaishintō (1952–1954); JDP (1954–1955)
- Parent: Yukio Sakurauchi (father)
- Relatives: Seiichi Ota (nephew)
- Education: Keio University

Yoshio Sakurauchi (櫻内 義雄, Sakurauchi Yoshio; 8 May 1912 – 5 July 2003) was a Japanese politician and a significant member of the Liberal Democratic Party (LDP). He was speaker of the House of Representatives of which he was a member for 53 years.

== Early life and education ==
Sakurauchi was born in Tokyo on 8 May 1912. He was the son of Yukio Sakurauchi, a lower house member and finance minister. Yoshio Sakurauchi attended the Keio schools from kindergarten through Keio University. His brother, Kimio, served as president (from 1961) and chairman of the board of directors (from 1971) at Chugoku Electric.

== Political career ==
Sakurauchi began his political career in 1947 when he was first elected to the lower house of Parliament. His constituency included Kashima. He served at the lower house for 18 terms. He was also once elected to the upper house, serving there for 19 months.

Sakurauchi held different ministerial and party posts in his career. In addition, he was leader of the Kano faction in the LDP. This faction was renamed as the Nakasone faction in 1965. His leadership of the faction lasted until 1989. Then the faction was headed by Michio Watanabe.

In addition, Sakurauchi served as foreign minister, agriculture minister, minister of international trade and industry and construction minister. Prime Minister Hayato Ikeda appointed Sakurauchi the minister of international trade and industry on 18 July 1964. Sakurauchi continued to serve in the same post in the next cabinet headed by Prime Minister Eisaku Satō, but he was fired and replaced by Miki Takeo in June 1965. On 28 April 1977, Sakurauchi was appointed construction minister to the government of Takeo Fukuda in a cabinet reshuffle, replacing Shiro Hasegawa in the post. Sakurauchi served as construction minister until 7 December 1978.

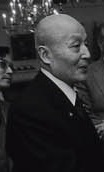
Sakurauchi in 1982

Sakurauchi was appointed the secretary general of the LDP on 16 November 1979. During his term, he called for making the Yasukuni Shrine a state shrine. His term lasted until 30 November 1981 when he was named foreign minister. Susumu Nikaido replaced him as the secretary general of the LDP. He was appointed foreign minister in the cabinet led by Prime Minister Zenkō Suzuki on 30 November 1981, replacing Sunao Sonoda in the post.

Sakurachi also served as the head of the LDP's chief policy-making body. In addition, he was appointed speaker of Japan's lower house of parliament on 27 February 1990, replacing Hajime Tamura in the post. In January 1992, he argued that the United States' economic problems resulted from its work force since the US workers were "too lazy" to compete with Japan, and that nearly a third of its workers "cannot even read." Sakurachi's term as speaker ended on 18 June 1993 and Takako Doi became the speaker.

Besides these positions, Sakurauchi was named as the first chairman of the League for Japan-Vietnam Friendship that was established by Japanese and Vietnamese politicians in 1974 to promote mutual understanding and friendship between Japan and Vietnam.

Sakurauchi was not included in the LDP's proportional representation list for the 25 June 2000 general elections, and he stated that he would retire from politics. Eventually, he retired from politics in June 2000.

== Death and funeral ==
Sakurauchi died of respiratory failure at a Tokyo hospital on 5 July 2003. He was 91. His funeral service was held at Ikegami Hommonji Temple in Tokyo's Ota Ward on 8 July 2003.

== Honors ==
In 1986, Sakurauchi, a former board member of the Boy Scouts of Japan and President of the Scout Parliamentary Caucus, received the 185th Bronze Wolf Award of the World Scout Committee for services to world Scouting. In 1981 he also received the highest distinction of the Scout Association of Japan, the Golden Pheasant Award.

The Government of India awarded him the third highest civilian honour of the Padma Bhushan, in 1989, for his contributions to public affairs.

House of Representatives (Japan)
Preceded by Tokuji Tokonami	Chair, Committee on Foreign Relations of the House of Representatives of Japan; 1958–1959	Succeeded by Saeki Ozawa
Preceded by Seigo Hamano	Chair, Committee on Education of the House of Representatives of Japan; 1961–1962	Succeeded by Tokuji Tokonami
Preceded by Kakuei Tanaka	Chair, Committee on Foreign Affairs of the House of Representatives of Japan; 1971–1972	Succeeded by Tokuyasu Fukuda
Preceded by Hajime Tamura	Speaker of the House of Representatives of Japan; 1990–1993	Succeeded by Takako Doi
Political offices
Preceded by Hajime Fukuda	Minister of International Trade and Industry; 1964–1965	Succeeded by Takeo Miki
Preceded by Tokuro Adachi	Minister of Agriculture and Forestry; 1973–1974	Succeeded by Tadao Kuraishi
Preceded by Shiro Hasegawa	Minister of Construction; 1977–1978	Succeeded by Motosaburo Tokai
Preceded by Kichirō Tazawa	Head of the National Land Agency; 1977–1978	Succeeded by Shiro Nakano
Preceded by Sunao Sonoda	Minister for Foreign Affairs of Japan; 1981–1982	Succeeded by Shintaro Abe
Party political offices
Preceded by Zentaro Kosaka	Chair, Policy Research Committee of the Liberal Democratic Party of Japan; 1972	Succeeded by Tadao Kuraishi
Preceded by Raizo Matsuno	Chair, Policy Research Committee of the Liberal Democratic Party of Japan; 1976	Succeeded by Toshio Komoto
Preceded by Kunikichi Saito	Secretary-General of the Liberal Democratic Party; 1979–1981	Succeeded by Susumu Nikaido
Preceded by Yasuhiro Nakasone	Chair, Seisaku Kagaku Kenkyūjo; 1982–1987	Succeeded by Yasuhiro Nakasone
Preceded by Yasuhiro Nakasone	Chair, Seisaku Kagaku Kenkyūjo; 1989–1990	Succeeded by Michio Watanabe
Non-profit organization positions
Preceded by Hisato Ichimada	Chair, Japan-India Association; 1955–2003	Succeeded by Yoshirō Mori
Sporting positions
New title	Chairman of the Japan Professional Sports Association; 1990-2002	Succeeded by Kakuji Yanagawa
