= Shimane at-large district (House of Representatives) =

Electoral district in Japan

The Shimane at-large district (Japanese: 島根県全県区, Hepburn: Shimane-ken Zenken-ku) was an electoral district represented in the House of Representatives in the National Diet of Japan. From 1947 until 1993, it elected five representatives from Shimane Prefecture. Prime Minister Noboru Takeshita was elected to the seat in the last thirteen elections (out of eighteen) the district existed.

== History ==
In the 1947 Japanese general election, for the only time in the district's history, left-leaning parties held a majority of the district's seats. However, conservative parties took a majority of the seats in the 1949 Japanese general election, and would continue to do so for the rest of the district's existence, including after the formation of the Liberal Democratic Party. Due to the 1994 Japanese electoral reform, the at-large district was replaced with three single-member districts starting with the 1996 Japanese general election.

At the time the Public Offices Election Law came into law in 1950, the district encompassed the entirely of Shimane Prefecture.

Among the district's representatives were Prime Minister Noboru Takeshita, who was elected to the seat in the last thirteen elections (out of eighteen) the district existed; House speakers Yoshio Sakurauchi and Hiroyuki Hosoda; and cabinet member Kozaemon Kimura.

== Results ==
1947
| Party | Candidate | Votes | % | ±% |
|---|---|---|---|---|
| Democratic | Kozaemon Kimura | 124,443 | 33.4 | New |
| Socialist | Toshi Nakazaki | 51,994 | 14.0 | New |
| Socialist | Junzō Matsumoto | 50,939 | 13.7 | New |
| Democratic | Saburō Ogoshi | 30,800 | 8.3 | New |
| JCP | Sakae Kimura | 20,597 | 5.5 | New |
| National Cooperative | Dentoku Shirakawa | 17,532 | 4.7 | New |
| Liberal | Kūzen Undō | 16,900 | 4.5 | New |
| Socialist | Risaburō Fukuda | 15,805 | 4.2 | New |
| Liberal | Tadashi Nanba | 15,050 | 4.0 | New |
| Independent | Shigenori Sasada | 9,853 | 2.6 | New |
| Socialist | Tatsujirō Hatao | 7,698 | 2.1 | New |
| Independent | Toraji Tanaka | 5,682 | 1.5 | New |
| Independent | Yoshio Ninomiya | 4,783 | 1.3 | New |

1949
| Party | Candidate | Votes | % | ±% |
|---|---|---|---|---|
| Democratic | Kozaemon Kimura | 74,213 | 17.4 | −16.0 |
| Democratic Liberal | Takeo Ōhashi | 59,486 | 14.0 | New |
| Democratic | Toshinaga Yamamoto | 50,722 | 11.9 | 3.6 |
| Socialist | Toshi Nakazaki | 48,383 | 11.3 | −2.8 |
| JCP | Sakae Kimura | 47,724 | 11.2 | New |
| Independent | Yūtarō Mishima | 45,071 | 10.6 | New |
| Democratic Liberal | Saburō Ogoshi | 39,085 | 9.2 | New |
| Socialist | Junzō Matsumoto | 30,712 | 7.2 | −6.5 |
| National Cooperative | Dentoku Shirakawa | 16,490 | 3.9 | −0.8 |
| Socialist | Yoshinori Higuchi | 14,232 | 3.3 | −0.9 |

1952
| Party | Candidate | Votes | % | ±% |
|---|---|---|---|---|
| Liberal | Takeo Ōhashi | 95,892 | 21.7 | New |
| Kaishintō | Yoshio Sakurauchi | 75,335 | 17.1 | New |
| Liberal | Tadao Hidaka | 57,661 | 13.1 | New |
| Right Socialist | Toshi Nakazaki | 53,553 | 12.1 | New |
| Other | Hideo Nakamura | 52,258 | 11.8 | New |
| Kaishintō | Toshinaga Yamamoto | 46,566 | 10.5 | New |
| Liberal | Enzaburō Takahashi | 45,363 | 10.3 | New |
| JCP | Hirotaka Kanamori | 15,200 | 3.4 | −7.8 |

1953
| Party | Candidate | Votes | % | ±% |
|---|---|---|---|---|
| Liberal | Enzaburō Takahashi | 88,420 | 20.2 | −1.5 |
| Kaishintō | Yoshio Sakurauchi | 65,426 | 15.0 | −2.1 |
| Independent | Hideo Nakamura | 61,858 | 14.2 | New |
| Liberal | Takeo Ōhashi | 60,660 | 13.9 | 0.8 |
| Right Socialist | Toshi Nakazaki | 57,594 | 13.2 | 1.1 |
| Kaishintō | Toshinaga Yamamoto | 49,438 | 11.3 | 0.8 |
| Liberal | Tadao Hidaka | 49,130 | 11.2 | 0.9 |
| Independent | Akira Terato | 4,281 | 1.0 | New |

1955
| Party | Candidate | Votes | % | ±% |
|---|---|---|---|---|
| Democratic | Yoshio Sakurauchi | 79,170 | 17.5 | New |
| Democratic | Toshinaga Yamamoto | 77,899 | 17.2 | New |
| Liberal | Takeo Ōhashi | 75,039 | 16.6 | −3.6 |
| Left Socialist | Hideo Nakamura | 62,579 | 13.8 | New |
| Right Socialist | Toshi Nakazaki | 59,321 | 13.1 | −0.1 |
| Liberal | Enzaburō Takahashi | 54,284 | 12.0 | −1.9 |
| Independent | Akiyoshi Tajiri | 29,022 | 6.4 | New |
| JCP | Hirotaka Kanamori | 14,821 | 3.3 | New |

1958
| Party | Candidate | Votes | % | ±% |
|---|---|---|---|---|
| LDP | Noboru Takeshita | 95,611 | 21.1 | New |
| LDP | Takeo Ōhashi | 79,791 | 17.6 | New |
| Socialist | Toshi Nakazaki | 71,680 | 15.8 | New |
| LDP | Yoshio Sakurauchi | 69,009 | 15.2 | New |
| Socialist | Hideo Nakamura | 67,851 | 14.9 | New |
| LDP | Toshinaga Yamamoto | 55,979 | 12.3 | New |
| JCP | Sakae Kimura | 14,083 | 3.1 | −0.2 |

1960
| Party | Candidate | Votes | % | ±% |
|---|---|---|---|---|
| LDP | Takeo Ōhashi | 89,878 | 19.4 | −1.7 |
| LDP | Yoshio Sakurauchi | 79,932 | 17.2 | −0.4 |
| LDP | Noboru Takeshita | 78,286 | 16.9 | 1.7 |
| Socialist | Hideo Nakamura | 77,888 | 16.8 | 1.0 |
| LDP | Kichizō Hosoda | 72,732 | 15.7 | 3.4 |
| Democratic Socialist | Toshi Nakazaki | 54,483 | 11.8 | New |
| JCP | Ichirō Katō | 9,862 | 2.1 | −1.0 |
| Higo Tōru Office | Gen'ichi Horii | 408 | 0.1 | New |

1963
| Party | Candidate | Votes | % | ±% |
|---|---|---|---|---|
| LDP | Takeo Ōhashi | 81,080 | 17.9 | −1.5 |
| LDP | Noboru Takeshita | 77,745 | 17.2 | 0.0 |
| Socialist | Masami Urabe | 75,031 | 16.6 | −0.2 |
| LDP | Yoshio Sakurauchi | 71,229 | 15.8 | −1.1 |
| LDP | Kichizō Hosoda | 67,503 | 14.9 | −0.8 |
| Socialist | Hideo Nakamura | 66,875 | 14.8 | New |
| JCP | Hirotaka Kanamori | 12,450 | 2.8 | 0.7 |

1967
| Party | Candidate | Votes | % | ±% |
|---|---|---|---|---|
| LDP | Yoshio Sakurauchi | 81,891 | 18.1 | 0.2 |
| LDP | Noboru Takeshita | 78,307 | 17.3 | 0.1 |
| LDP | Kichizō Hosoda | 77,845 | 17.2 | 1.4 |
| Socialist | Shimao Gōdo | 71,816 | 15.9 | −0.7 |
| LDP | Takeo Ōhashi | 68,008 | 15.1 | 0.2 |
| Socialist | Masami Urabe | 63,959 | 14.2 | −0.6 |
| JCP | Kazuo Wada | 9,546 | 2.1 | −0.7 |

1969
| Party | Candidate | Votes | % | ±% |
|---|---|---|---|---|
| LDP | Takeo Ōhashi | 87,865 | 19.7 | 1.6 |
| LDP | Noboru Takeshita | 79,525 | 17.8 | 0.5 |
| Socialist | Masami Urabe | 71,614 | 16.0 | 0.1 |
| LDP | Yoshio Sakurauchi | 71,075 | 15.9 | −1.3 |
| LDP | Kichizō Hosoda | 64,649 | 14.5 | −0.6 |
| Socialist | Shimao Gōdo | 60,367 | 13.5 | −0.7 |
| JCP | Kazuo Wada | 11,495 | 2.6 | 0.5 |

1972
| Party | Candidate | Votes | % | ±% |
|---|---|---|---|---|
| LDP | Noboru Takeshita | 105,977 | 22.6 | 2.9 |
| Socialist | Shimao Gōdo | 82,109 | 17.5 | 1.5 |
| LDP | Yoshio Sakurauchi | 73,021 | 15.6 | −2.2 |
| LDP | Kichizō Hosoda | 67,860 | 14.5 | −1.4 |
| LDP | Takeo Ōhashi | 61,413 | 13.1 | −1.4 |
| Socialist | Masami Urabe | 60,480 | 12.9 | −0.6 |
| JCP | Yukio Iizuka | 17,652 | 3.8 | 1.2 |

1976
| Party | Candidate | Votes | % | ±% |
|---|---|---|---|---|
| LDP | Noboru Takeshita | 87,919 | 18.1 | −4.5 |
| LDP | Yoshio Sakurauchi | 68,395 | 14.1 | −1.5 |
| Socialist | Yoneji Yoshihara | 61,411 | 12.6 | −4.9 |
| LDP | Kichizō Hosoda | 60,519 | 12.4 | −2.1 |
| Socialist | Taiji Togano | 58,692 | 12.1 | −0.8 |
| LDP | Takeo Ōhashi | 49,580 | 10.2 | −2.9 |
| JCP | Yoshiko Nakabayashi | 47,350 | 9.7 | 5.9 |
| Kōmeitō | Shigeru Nagase | 31,493 | 6.5 | New |
| New Liberal Club | Yoshikiyo Wada | 17,129 | 3.5 | New |
| Independent | Tetsuyō Ikeda | 3,622 | 0.7 | New |

1979
| Party | Candidate | Votes | % | ±% |
|---|---|---|---|---|
| LDP | Noboru Takeshita | 103,586 | 21.6 | 3.5 |
| LDP | Yoshio Sakurauchi | 78,531 | 16.4 | 2.3 |
| JCP | Yoshiko Nakabayashi | 67,154 | 14.0 | 4.3 |
| LDP | Kichizō Hosoda | 58,828 | 12.2 | −0.2 |
| Socialist | Yoneji Yoshihara | 56,121 | 11.7 | −0.9 |
| Socialist | Taiji Togano | 55,382 | 11.5 | −0.6 |
| Democratic Socialist | Kizan Shimada | 51,122 | 10.6 | New |
| New Liberal Club | Yoshikiyo Wada | 9,527 | 2.0 | −1.5 |

1980
| Party | Candidate | Votes | % | ±% |
|---|---|---|---|---|
| LDP | Noboru Takeshita | 112,565 | 22.9 | 1.3 |
| LDP | Kichizō Hosoda | 107,890 | 22.0 | 5.6 |
| LDP | Yoshio Sakurauchi | 82,670 | 16.8 | 4.6 |
| Socialist | Taiji Togano | 67,573 | 13.8 | 2.1 |
| Socialist | Yoneji Yoshihara | 60,168 | 12.3 | 0.8 |
| JCP | Yoshiko Nakabayashi | 59,546 | 12.1 | −1.9 |
| Son'nō Gijuku Jingi-sha | Sanzō Andō | 648 | 0.1 | New |

1983
| Party | Candidate | Votes | % | ±% |
|---|---|---|---|---|
| LDP | Noboru Takeshita | 117,529 | 24.9 | 2.0 |
| LDP | Yoshio Sakurauchi | 86,620 | 18.4 | −3.6 |
| JCP | Yoshiko Nakabayashi | 70,156 | 14.9 | 2.8 |
| Socialist | Yoneji Yoshihara | 68,525 | 14.5 | 0.7 |
| LDP | Kichizō Hosoda | 64,227 | 13.6 | −3.2 |
| Socialist | Taiji Togano | 64,026 | 13.6 | 1.3 |

1986
| Party | Candidate | Votes | % | ±% |
|---|---|---|---|---|
| LDP | Noboru Takeshita | 139,903 | 27.9 | 3.0 |
| LDP | Yoshio Sakurauchi | 80,384 | 16.1 | −2.3 |
| LDP | Kichizō Hosoda | 75,629 | 15.1 | 1.5 |
| Socialist | Misao Ishibashi | 53,707 | 10.7 | −3.8 |
| Socialist | Yoneji Yoshihara | 52,686 | 10.5 | −3.1 |
| JCP | Yoshiko Nakabayashi | 50,363 | 10.1 | −4.8 |
| Independent | Hisaoki Kamei | 48,146 | 9.6 | New |

1990
| Party | Candidate | Votes | % | ±% |
|---|---|---|---|---|
| LDP | Noboru Takeshita | 108,169 | 21.4 | −6.5 |
| LDP | Yoshio Sakurauchi | 79,890 | 15.8 | −0.3 |
| LDP | Hiroyuki Hosoda | 77,099 | 15.3 | 0.2 |
| Independent | Hisaoki Kamei | 75,252 | 14.9 | 5.3 |
| Socialist | Misao Ishibashi | 61,604 | 12.2 | 1.5 |
| Socialist | Yoneji Yoshihara | 60,072 | 11.9 | 1.4 |
| JCP | Yoshiko Nakabayashi | 42,583 | 8.4 | −1.7 |

1993
| Party | Candidate | Votes | % | ±% |
|---|---|---|---|---|
| Independent | Noboru Takeshita | 105,296 | 21.7 | New |
| LDP | Hiroyuki Hosoda | 72,277 | 14.9 | −6.5 |
| Socialist | Daikichi Ishibashi | 69,037 | 14.3 | 2.1 |
| LDP | Yoshio Sakurauchi | 63,905 | 13.2 | −2.6 |
| NP-Sakigake | Atsushi Nishikōri | 57,962 | 12.0 | New |
| LDP | Hisaoki Kamei | 55,584 | 11.5 | −3.8 |
| JCP | Yoshiko Nakabayashi | 42,744 | 8.8 | 0.4 |
| Independent | Kiyoshi Sakamoto | 16,188 | 3.3 | New |
| Independent | Etsuo Minami | 1,255 | 0.3 | New |
| Turnout | | 592,509 | 82.6 | |
