= Michihiro Ishibashi =

Japanese politician (born 1965)

- 石橋 通宏
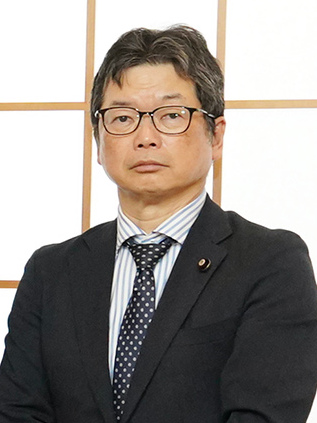
- Ishibashi in 2025

Member of House of Councillors
- Incumbent
- Assumed office 26 July 2010
- Constituency: National PR

Personal details
- Born: 1 July 1965 (age 61) Yasugi, Shimane, Japan
- Party: CDP (since 2018)
- Other political affiliations: DPJ (2010–2016); DP (2016–2018)
- Parent: Daikichi Ishibashi (father)
- Education: Chuo University
- Website: Official website

Michihiro Ishibashi (石橋 通宏, Ishibashi Michihiro; born 1 July 1965) is a Japanese politician from the Constitutional Democratic Party and a former trade union leader. He currently serves as members of the House of Councillors being elected from the National Representation list in 2010.

His father Daikichi Ishibashi was a member of the House of Representatives.
