= Riki Kawara =

Japanese politician (1937–2013)

- 瓦 力
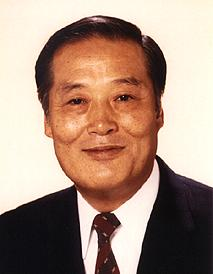
- Official portrait, 1997

Director-General of the Japan Defense Agency
- In office 5 October 1999 – 4 July 2000
- Prime Minister: Keizō Obuchi
- Preceded by: Hosei Norota
- Succeeded by: Kazuo Torashima
- In office 6 November 1987 – 24 August 1988
- Prime Minister: Noboru Takeshita
- Preceded by: Kurihara Yoshiyuki
- Succeeded by: Kichirō Tazawa

Minister of Construction
- In office 11 September 1997 – 30 July 1998
- Prime Minister: Ryutaro Hashimoto
- Preceded by: Shizuka Kamei
- Succeeded by: Katsutsugu Sekiya

Deputy Chief Cabinet Secretary (Political affairs)
- In office 17 July 1980 – 30 November 1981
- Prime Minister: Zenkō Suzuki
- Preceded by: Koichi Kato
- Succeeded by: Yukihiko Ikeda

Member of the House of Representatives; from Hokuriku-Shin'etsu
- In office 10 December 1972 – 21 July 2009
- Preceded by: Shūji Masutani
- Succeeded by: Multi-member district
- Constituency: Ishikawa 2nd (1972–1996); Ishikawa 3rd (1996–2005); PR block (2005–2009)

Personal details
- Born: 1 April 1937 Nanao, Ishikawa, Japan
- Died: 13 January 2013 (aged 75) Nanao, Ishikawa, Japan
- Party: Liberal Democratic
- Education: Chuo University

Tsutomu Kawara (瓦 力, Kawara Tsutomu; 1 April 1937 – 13 January 2013) was a Japanese politician of the Liberal Democratic Party.

== Biography ==
Kawara was a member of the House of Representatives in the Diet (national legislature). A native of Nanao, Ishikawa and graduate of Chuo University, he was elected for the first time in 1972. In 1987, he assumed the post of Director General of the Japan Defense Agency (and again in 1999 to 2000). He resigned a year later after taking responsibility for the Nadashio incident. Kichirō Tazawa replaced him in the post.

He was later appointed construction minister in the Hashimoto cabinet. He retired from politics in 2009. He died in Nanao, Ishikawa, in early January 2013 of pneumonia.
