= District 2, Grand Bassa County =

District of Liberia

Coordinates: 6°21′22″N 9°51′29″W

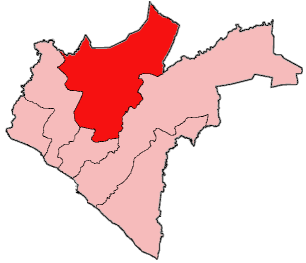
Location of District #2 in Grand Bassa County

District #2 is one of six districts located in Grand Bassa County, Liberia.
