= Daikichi Ishibashi =

Japanese politician (1932–2022)

- 石橋 大吉

Member of the House of Representatives
- In office 8 July 1986 – 2 June 2000
- Preceded by: Yoshiko Nakabayashi
- Succeeded by: Multi-member district
- Constituency: Shimane at-large (1986–1996); Chūgoku PR (1996–2000)

Personal details
- Born: 7 January 1932 Matsue, Shimane, Japan
- Died: 26 August 2022 (aged 90) Matsue, Shimane, Japan
- Party: Democratic (1998–2005)
- Other political affiliations: JSP (1980–1996); SDP (1996); DP (1996–1998)
- Children: Michihiro Ishibashi

Daikichi Ishibashi (Japanese: 石橋 大吉 Ishibashi Daikichi; 7 January 1932 – 26 August 2022) was a Japanese politician. A member of the Japan Socialist Party, the Social Democratic Party, and later the Democratic Party of Japan, he served in the House of Representatives from 1986 to 2000.

Ishibashi died in Matsue on 26 August 2022, at the age of 90.
