= California's 2nd district =

California's 2nd district may refer to:

- California's 2nd congressional district
- California's 2nd State Assembly district
- California's 2nd State Senate district
