= Aomori 2nd district (1947–1993) =

Former Japan House of Representatives constituency

== List of representatives ==
- Kichirō Tazawa, Liberal Democratic Party, 1960・1963・1967・1969・1972・1976・1979・1980・1983・1986・1990・1993

== Election results ==
- 1993 Japanese general election
  - Kichirō Tazawa, Liberal Democratic Party
- 1990 Japanese general election
  - Kichirō Tazawa, Liberal Democratic Party
- 1986 Japanese general election
  - Kichirō Tazawa, Liberal Democratic Party
- 1983 Japanese general election
  - Kichirō Tazawa, Liberal Democratic Party
- 1980 Japanese general election
  - Kichirō Tazawa, Liberal Democratic Party
- 1979 Japanese general election
  - Kichirō Tazawa, Liberal Democratic Party
- 1976 Japanese general election
  - Kichirō Tazawa, Liberal Democratic Party
- 1972 Japanese general election
  - Kichirō Tazawa, Liberal Democratic Party
- 1969 Japanese general election
  - Kichirō Tazawa, Liberal Democratic Party
- 1967 Japanese general election
  - Kichirō Tazawa, Liberal Democratic Party
- 1963 Japanese general election
  - Kichirō Tazawa, Liberal Democratic Party
- 1960 Japanese general election
  - Kichirō Tazawa, Liberal Democratic Party
- 1947 Japanese general election
