= Chūgoku proportional representation block =

Japanese House of Representatives constituency

Chūgoku Proportional Representation Block
- Parliamentary constituency for the Japanese House of Representatives
- Map of House of Representatives proportional blocks, with the Chūgoku block highlighted
- Prefecture: Tottori, Shimane, Okayama, Hiroshima and Yamaguchi
- Electorate: 5,832,097 (2026)

Current constituency
- Created: 1994
- Representatives: 10

The Chūgoku proportional representation block (Japanese: 比例中国ブロック, Hepburn: Hirei chūgo ku burokku) is one of eleven proportional representation (PR) "blocks", multi-member constituencies for the House of Representatives in the Diet of Japan. It consists of the prefectures of Tottori, Shimane, Okayama, Hiroshima, and Yamaguchi. Following the introduction of proportional voting, Chūgoku elected 13 representatives by PR in the 1996 general election, reduced to 11 in the election of 2000, and again to 10 in 2024.

== Results timeline ==
=== Vote share ===
| Party | 1996 | 2000 | 2003 | 2005 | 2009 | 2012 | 2014 | 2017 | 2021 | 2024 | 2026 |
|---|---|---|---|---|---|---|---|---|---|---|---|
| LDP | 42.81 | 35.59 | 37.41 | 36.72 | 32.37 | 34.53 | 38.16 | 39.18 | 43.36 | 35.89 | 43.17 |
| NFP | 23.96 | | | | | | | | | | |
| DPJ (Note: 1996 DP) | 12.59 | 21.68 | 33.80 | 28.59 | 39.73 | 16.28 | 17.08 | | | | |
| JCP | 9.66 | 8.91 | 6.31 | 5.90 | 5.71 | 4.98 | 9.19 | 6.25 | 5.55 | 5.07 | 3.66 |
| SDP | 6.37 | 9.23 | 4.77 | 5.15 | 3.64 | 1.96 | 2.11 | 1.39 | 1.69 | 1.82 | 1.25 |
| NPS | 1.19 | | | | | | | | | | |
| Komeito | | 15.32 | 17.71 | 15.74 | 12.95 | 14.08 | 16.66 | 14.94 | 13.98 | 12.04 | |
| LP | | 8.87 | | | | | | | | | |
| PNP | | | | 7.90 | 4.85 | | | | | | |
| Ishin (Note: 2012 JRP, 2014 JIP) | | | | | | 17.75 | 12.71 | 4.74 | 9.18 | 6.37 | 7.10 |
| Your | | | | | | 5.98 | | | | | |
| TPJ | | | | | | 4.03 | | | | | |
| CDP | | | | | | | | 16.72 | 18.38 | 19.45 | |
| KnT | | | | | | | | 16.13 | | | |
| DPFP | | | | | | | | | 3.65 | 10.45 | 9.09 |
| Reiwa | | | | | | | | | 3.03 | 5.90 | 2.90 |
| Sanseitō | | | | | | | | | | 3.00 | 8.39 |
| CRA | | | | | | | | | | | 20.64 |
| Others | 3.41 (Note: NSP 3.41) | 0.40 | | | 0.75 (Note: HRP 0.75) | 0.41 (Note: HRP 0.41) | 4.09 (Note: Generations 3.51, HRP 0.58) | 0.65 (Note: HRP 0.65) | 1.18 (Note: NHK 1.18) | | 1.35 (Note: Genyu 1.35) |
| Turnout | | 64.97 | 61.74 | 68.90 | 70.94 | 58.35 | 51.96 | 52.58 | 52.69 | 51.19 | 52.47 |

=== Seat distribution ===
| Election | Distribution | Seats |
|---|---|---|
| 1996 | | 13 |
| 2000 | | 11 |
| 2003 | | 11 |
| 2005 | | 11 |
| 2009 | | 11 |
| 2012 | | 11 |
| 2014 | | 11 |
| 2017 | | 11 |
| 2021 | | 11 |
| 2024 | | 10 |
| 2026 | | 10 |

== List of representatives ==
| D'Hondt allocation order | 1996 | 2000 | 2003 | 2005 | 2009 | 2012 | 2014 | 2017 |
|---|---|---|---|---|---|---|---|---|
| 1 | Kazuko Nose | Kiichi Miyazawa | Hisaoki Kamei | Toshiko Abe | Shunji Yuhara | Toshifumi Kojima | Toshiko Abe | Toshifumi Kojima |
| 2 | Tetsuo Saito | Isao Yamauchi | Isao Yamauchi | Takashi Wada | Toshiko Abe | Kei Nakamaru | Toshifumi Kojima | Mio Sugita |
| 3 | Yoshio Sakurauchi | Yoshiro Hayashi | Katsuyuki Kawai | Katsunobu Kato | Takashi Takai | Toshiko Abe | Michiyoshi Yunoki | Akiko Kamei |
| 4 | Yoshiro Hayashi | Tetsuo Saito | Tetsuo Saito | Tetsuo Saito | Yoshitaka Murata | Michiyoshi Yunoki | Tetsuo Saito | Michiyoshi Yunoki |
| 5 | Daikichi Ishibashi | Kozo Hirabayashi | Keisuke Tsumura | Mitsuo Mitani | Hiroshi Sugakawa | Tetsuo Saito | Masayoshi Shintani | Tetsuo Saito |
| 6 | Keigo Masuya | Toshimasa Yamada | Katsunobu Kato | Yoshitake Masuhara | Tetsuo Saito | Masayoshi Yoshino | Takashi Takai | Michitaka Ikeda |
| 7 | Kazuho Tanigawa | Tetsuo Kaneko | Koji Sato | Daisuke Matsumoto | Katsuyuki Kawai | Daisuke Sakamoto | Michitaka Ikeda | Keiichi Furuta |
| 8 | Seiji Masamori | Yoshiko Nakabayashi | Kazuko Nose | Seiji Hagiwara | Hiroki Hanasaki | Mitsuhiro Uesugi | Yoshinobu Ohira | Takashi Takai |
| 9 | Kozo Hirabayashi | Kazuho Tanigawa | Keigo Masuya | Hisaoki Kamei | Hidenao Nakagawa | Keisuke Tsumura | Keisuke Tsumura | Keisuke Tsumura |
| 10 | Mutsuki Kato | Koji Sato | Takashi Wada | Keigo Masuya | Noboru Miura | Keigo Masuya | Keigo Masuya | Shogo Nemoto |
| 11 | Hinokita Hitoshi | Keigo Masuya | Shinji Sato | Gaku Hashimoto | Toshiaki Komuro | Michitaka Ikeda | Keiichi Furuta | Keigo Masuya |
| 12 | Tadatoshi Akiba | Seats abolished | | | | | | |
| 13 | Shingo Nakagiri | Seats abolished | | | | | | |

== Election results ==
=== 2026 ===
2026 results in the Chugoku PR block
| Party | Votes | Swing | % | Seats | +/– |
|---|---|---|---|---|---|
| Liberal Democratic Party (LDP) | 1,297,078 | 43.17 | ▲7.28 | 5 (Note: One of six seats forfeited due to lack of candidates) | 0 |
| Centrist Reform Alliance (CRA) (Note: Swings compared to CDP and Komeito) | 620,211 | 20.64 | ▼10.85 | 2 | ▼2 |
| Democratic Party For the People (DPFP) | 273,263 | 9.09 | ▼1.36 | 1 | 0 |
| Sanseitō | 252,036 | 8.39 | ▲5.39 | 1 | ▲1 |
| Japan Innovation Party (Ishin) | 213,428 | 7.10 | ▲0.73 | 1 | ▲1 |
| Japanese Communist Party (JCP) | 109,968 | 3.66 | ▼1.41 | 0 | 0 |
| Reiwa Shinsengumi (Reiwa) | 87,272 | 2.90 | ▼3.00 | 0 | 0 |
| Conservative Party of Japan (CPJ) | 73,431 | 2.44 | New | 0 | New |
| Tax Cuts Japan and Yukoku Alliance (Genyu) | 40,460 | 1.35 | New | 0 | New |
| Social Democratic Party (SDP) | 37,654 | 1.25 | ▼0.57 | 0 | 0 |
| Total | 3,004,801 | 100.00 | | 10 | |
| Invalid votes | 55,122 | 1.80 | | | |
| Turnout | 3,059,923 | 52.47 | ▲1.28 | | |
| Registered voters | 5,832,097 | | | | |

=== 2024 ===
2024 results in the Chugoku PR block
| Party | Votes | Swing | % | Seats | +/– |
|---|---|---|---|---|---|
| Liberal Democratic Party (LDP) | 1,056,320 | 35.89 | ▼7.47 | 5 | ▼1 |
| Constitutional Democratic Party of Japan (CDP) | 572,598 | 19.45 | ▲1.08 | 3 | ▲1 |
| Komeito | 354,291 | 12.04 | ▼1.95 | 1 | ▼1 |
| Democratic Party For the People (DPFP) | 307,681 | 10.45 | ▲6.80 | 1 | ▲1 |
| Japan Innovation Party (Ishin) | 187,517 | 6.37 | ▼2.81 | 0 | ▼1 |
| Reiwa Shinsengumi (Reiwa) | 173,622 | 5.90 | ▲2.87 | 0 | 0 |
| Japanese Communist Party (JCP) | 149,218 | 5.07 | ▼0.48 | 0 | 0 |
| Sanseitō | 88,358 | 3.00 | New | 0 | New |
| Social Democratic Party (SDP) | 53,620 | 1.82 | ▲0.13 | 0 | 0 |
| Total | 2,943,225 | 100.00 | | 10 | ▼1 |
| Invalid votes | 78,661 | 2.60 | | | |
| Turnout | 3,021,886 | 51.19 | ▼1.49 | | |
| Registered voters | 5,902,785 | | | | |

=== 2021 ===
2021 results in the Chugoku PR block
| Party | Votes | Swing | % | Seats | +/– |
|---|---|---|---|---|---|
| Liberal Democratic Party (LDP) | 1,352,723 | 43.36 | ▲4.18 | 6 | ▲1 |
| Constitutional Democratic Party of Japan (CDP) | 573,324 | 18.38 | ▲1.66 | 2 | 0 |
| Komeito | 436,220 | 13.98 | ▼0.98 | 2 | 0 |
| Japan Innovation Party (Ishin) | 286,302 | 9.18 | ▲4.43 | 1 | ▲1 |
| Japanese Communist Party (JCP) | 173,117 | 5.55 | ▼0.70 | 0 | 0 |
| Democratic Party For the People (DPFP) | 113,899 | 3.65 | New | 0 | New |
| Reiwa Shinsengumi (Reiwa) | 94,446 | 3.03 | New | 0 | New |
| Social Democratic Party (SDP) | 52,638 | 1.69 | ▲0.30 | 0 | 0 |
| NHK Party | 36,758 | 1.18 | New | 0 | New |
| Total | 3,119,427 | 100.00 | | 11 | |
| Invalid votes | 72,840 | 2.28 | | | |
| Turnout | 3,192,267 | 52.69 | ▲0.11 | | |
| Registered voters | 6,058,900 | | | | |

=== 2017 ===
2017 results in the Chugoku PR block
| Party | Votes | Swing | % | Seats | +/– |
|---|---|---|---|---|---|
| Liberal Democratic Party (LDP) | 1,249,073 | 39.18 | ▲1.02 | 5 | 0 |
| Constitutional Democratic Party of Japan (CDP) | 533,050 | 16.72 | New | 2 | New |
| Kibō no Tō | 514,191 | 16.13 | New | 2 | New |
| Komeito | 476,270 | 14.94 | ▼1.72 | 2 | 0 |
| Japanese Communist Party (JCP) | 199,152 | 6.25 | ▼2.95 | 0 | ▼1 |
| Japan Innovation Party (Ishin) | 151,221 | 4.74 | New | 0 | New |
| Social Democratic Party (SDP) | 44,240 | 1.39 | ▼0.72 | 0 | 0 |
| Happiness Realization Party (HRP) | 20,701 | 0.65 | ▲0.07 | 0 | 0 |
| Total | 3,187,898 | 100.00 | | 11 | |
| Invalid votes | 66,055 | 2.03 | | | |
| Turnout | 3,253,953 | 52.58 | ▲0.61 | | |
| Registered voters | 6,189,041 | | | | |

=== 2014 ===
2014 results in the Chugoku PR block
| Party | Votes | Swing | % | Seats | +/– |
|---|---|---|---|---|---|
| Liberal Democratic Party (LDP) | 1,183,903 | 38.16 | ▲3.63 | 5 | 0 |
| Democratic Party of Japan (DPJ) | 529,819 | 17.08 | ▲0.80 | 2 | 0 |
| Komeito | 516,892 | 16.66 | ▲2.58 | 2 | 0 |
| Japan Innovation Party (JIP) | 394,306 | 12.71 | ▼5.04 | 1 | ▼1 |
| Japanese Communist Party (JCP) | 285,224 | 9.19 | ▲4.21 | 1 | ▲1 |
| Party for Future Generations | 109,016 | 3.51 | New | 0 | New |
| Social Democratic Party (SDP) | 65,349 | 2.11 | ▲0.15 | 0 | 0 |
| Happiness Realization Party (HRP) | 18,015 | 0.58 | ▲0.17 | 0 | 0 |
| Total | 3,102,524 | 100.00 | | 11 | |
| Invalid votes | 75,864 | 2.39 | | | |
| Turnout | 3,178,388 | 51.96 | ▼6.38 | | |
| Registered voters | 6,116,465 | | | | |

=== 2012 ===
2012 results in the Chugoku PR block
| Party | Votes | Swing | % | Seats | +/– |
|---|---|---|---|---|---|
| Liberal Democratic Party (LDP) | 1,210,400 | 34.53 | ▲2.16 | 5 | ▲1 |
| Japan Restoration Party (JRP) | 622,226 | 17.75 | New | 2 | New |
| Democratic Party of Japan (DPJ) | 570,764 | 16.28 | ▼23.45 | 2 | ▼4 |
| Komeito | 493,800 | 14.08 | ▲1.13 | 2 | ▲1 |
| Your Party | 209,627 | 5.98 | New | 0 | New |
| Japanese Communist Party (JCP) | 174,648 | 4.98 | ▼0.72 | 0 | 0 |
| Tomorrow Party of Japan (TPJ) | 141,360 | 4.03 | New | 0 | New |
| Social Democratic Party (SDP) | 68,653 | 1.96 | ▼1.69 | 0 | 0 |
| Happiness Realization Party (HRP) | 14,383 | 0.41 | ▼0.34 | 0 | 0 |
| Total | 3,505,861 | 100.00 | | 11 | |
| Invalid votes | 82,531 | 2.30 | | | |
| Turnout | 3,588,392 | 58.35 | ▼12.59 | | |
| Registered voters | 6,150,109 | | | | |

=== 2009 ===
2009 results in the Chugoku PR block
| Party | Votes | Swing | % | Seats | +/– |
|---|---|---|---|---|---|
| Democratic Party of Japan (DPJ) | 1,704,242 | 39.73 | ▲11.13 | 6 | ▲3 |
| Liberal Democratic Party (LDP) | 1,388,451 | 32.37 | ▼3.45 | 4 | ▼1 |
| Komeito | 555,552 | 12.95 | ▼2.79 | 1 | ▼1 |
| Japanese Communist Party (JCP) | 244,761 | 5.71 | ▼0.20 | 0 | 0 |
| People's New Party (PNP) | 208,208 | 4.85 | ▼3.04 | 0 | ▼1 |
| Social Democratic Party (SDP) | 156,291 | 3.64 | ▼1.51 | 0 | 0 |
| Happiness Realization Party (HRP) | 32,319 | 0.75 | New | 0 | New |
| Total | 4,289,824 | 100.00 | | 11 | |
| Invalid votes | 106,928 | 2.43 | | | |
| Turnout | 4,396,752 | 70.94 | ▲2.04 | | |
| Registered voters | 6,197,763 | | | | |

=== 2005 ===
2005 results in the Chugoku PR block
| Party | Votes | Swing | % | Seats | +/– |
|---|---|---|---|---|---|
| Liberal Democratic Party (LDP) | 1,537,080 | 36.72 | ▼0.69 | 5 | 0 |
| Democratic Party of Japan (DPJ) | 1,196,971 | 28.59 | ▼5.21 | 3 | ▼1 |
| Komeito | 658,702 | 15.74 | ▼1.97 | 2 | 0 |
| People's New Party (PNP) | 330,546 | 7.90 | New | 1 | New |
| Japanese Communist Party (JCP) | 247,073 | 5.90 | ▼0.41 | 0 | 0 |
| Social Democratic Party (SDP) | 215,636 | 5.15 | ▲0.38 | 0 | 0 |
| Total | 4,186,008 | 100.00 | | 11 | |
| Invalid votes | 105,032 | 2.45 | | | |
| Turnout | 4,291,040 | 68.90 | ▲7.15 | | |
| Registered voters | 6,228,051 | | | | |

=== 2003 ===
2003 results in the Chugoku PR block
| Party | Votes | Swing | % | Seats | +/– |
|---|---|---|---|---|---|
| Liberal Democratic Party (LDP) | 1,388,768 | 37.41 | ▲1.82 | 5 | ▲1 |
| Democratic Party of Japan (DPJ) | 1,254,880 | 33.80 | ▲12.12 | 4 | ▲2 |
| Komeito | 657,311 | 17.71 | ▲2.39 | 2 | 0 |
| Japanese Communist Party (JCP) | 234,359 | 6.31 | ▼2.60 | 0 | ▼1 |
| Social Democratic Party (SDP) | 176,942 | 4.77 | ▼4.46 | 0 | ▼1 |
| Total | 3,712,260 | 100.00 | | 11 | |
| Invalid votes | 120,691 | 3.15 | | | |
| Turnout | 3,832,951 | 61.74 | ▼3.23 | | |
| Registered voters | 6,207,801 | | | | |

=== 2000 ===
2000 results in the Chugoku PR block
| Party | Votes | Swing | % | Seats | +/– |
|---|---|---|---|---|---|
| Liberal Democratic Party (LDP) | 1,364,938 | 35.59 | ▼7.23 | 4 | ▼2 |
| Democratic Party of Japan (DPJ) | 831,747 | 21.68 | ▲9.09 | 2 | 0 |
| Komeito | 587,603 | 15.32 | New | 2 | New |
| Social Democratic Party (SDP) | 353,973 | 9.23 | ▲2.86 | 1 | 0 |
| Japanese Communist Party (JCP) | 341,851 | 8.91 | ▼0.75 | 1 | 0 |
| Liberal Party (LP) | 340,358 | 8.87 | New | 1 | New |
| Liberal League (LL) | 15,164 | 0.40 | New | 0 | New |
| Total | 3,835,634 | 100.00 | | 11 | ▼2 |
| Invalid votes | 165,994 | 4.15 | | | |
| Turnout | 4,001,628 | 64.97 | | | |
| Registered voters | 6,158,811 | | | | |

=== 1996 ===
1996 results in the Chugoku PR block
| Party | Votes | % | Seats |
|---|---|---|---|
| Liberal Democratic Party (LDP) | 1,578,140 | 42.81 | 6 |
| New Frontier Party (NFP) | 883,319 | 23.96 | 3 |
| Democratic Party (DP) | 464,197 | 12.59 | 2 |
| Japanese Communist Party (JCP) | 356,108 | 9.66 | 1 |
| Social Democratic Party (SDP) | 234,642 | 6.37 | 1 |
| New Socialist Party (NSP) | 125,824 | 3.41 | 0 |
| New Party Sakigake (NPS) | 43,772 | 1.19 | 0 |
| Total | 3,686,002 | 100.00 | 13 |
