= Noboru Takeshita =

Prime Minister of Japan from 1987 to 1989

- 竹下 登
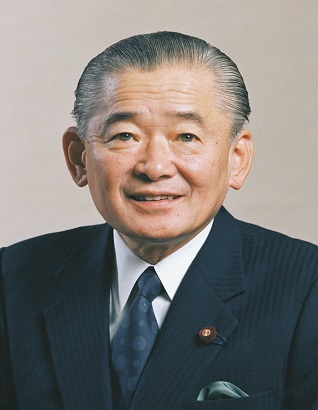
- Official portrait, 1987

Prime Minister of Japan
- In office 6 November 1987 – 3 June 1989
- Monarchs: Hirohito; Akihito
- Deputy: Kiichi Miyazawa
- Preceded by: Yasuhiro Nakasone
- Succeeded by: Sōsuke Uno

President of the Liberal Democratic Party
- In office 31 October 1987 – 2 June 1989
- Secretary-General: Shintaro Abe
- Preceded by: Yasuhiro Nakasone
- Succeeded by: Sōsuke Uno
Ministerial offices
Minister of Finance
Acting; 9 December 1988 – 24 December 1988
Preceded by	Kiichi Miyazawa
Succeeded by	Tatsuo Murayama
In office 27 November 1982 – 22 July 1986
Prime Minister	Yasuhiro Nakasone
Preceded by	Michio Watanabe
Succeeded by	Kiichi Miyazawa
In office 9 November 1979 – 17 July 1980
Prime Minister	Masayoshi Ōhira
Preceded by	Ippei Kaneko
Succeeded by	Michio Watanabe
Minister of Construction
In office 19 January 1976 – 15 September 1976
Prime Minister	Takeo Miki
Preceded by	Takeo Miki
Succeeded by	Tatsui Chūman
Chief Cabinet Secretary
In office 11 November 1974 – 9 December 1974
Prime Minister	Kakuei Tanaka
Preceded by	Susumu Nikaidō
Succeeded by	Ichitarō Ide
In office 5 July 1971 – 7 July 1972
Prime Minister	Eisaku Satō
Preceded by	Shigeru Hori
Succeeded by	Susumu Nikaidō
Deputy Chief Cabinet Secretary (Political affairs)
In office 9 November 1964 – 7 August 1966
Prime Minister	Eisaku Satō
Preceded by	Kunikichi Saitō
Succeeded by	Toshio Kimura
Party political offices
Secretary-General of the Liberal Democratic Party
In office July 1986 – October 1987
President	Yasuhiro Nakasone
Preceded by	Shin Kanemaru
Succeeded by	Shintaro Abe

Member of the House of Representatives
- In office 22 May 1958 – 2 June 2000
- Preceded by: Toshinaga Yamamoto
- Succeeded by: Wataru Takeshita
- Constituency: Shimane at-large (1958–1996); Shimane 2nd (1996–2000)

Member of the Shimane Prefectural Assembly
- In office 1951–1958

Personal details
- Born: 26 February 1924 Kakeyama, Shimane, Empire of Japan
- Died: 19 June 2000 (aged 76) Minato, Tokyo, Japan
- Party: Liberal Democratic
- Spouses: Masae Takeuchi (m. 1944; died 1945) Naoko Endō (m. 1946)
- Relatives: Wataru Takeshita (brother); Eiki Eiki (granddaughter); Daigo (grandson)
- Education: Waseda University
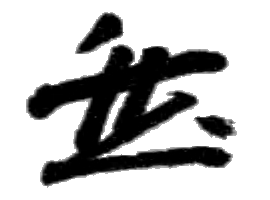
- Signature
- Noboru Takeshita's voice Takeshita on Japan–United States relations Recorded 13 January 1988

Noboru Takeshita (竹下 登, Takeshita Noboru; 26 February 1924 – 19 June 2000) was a Japanese politician who served as prime minister of Japan from 1987 to 1989.

Born in Shimane Prefecture, Takeshita attended Waseda University and was drafted into the army during the Pacific War. He was first elected to the National Diet in 1958, and served as chief cabinet secretary in 1971–1972 and in 1974, and as finance minister from 1979–1980, 1982–1986, and in 1988, during which he signed the Plaza Accord in 1985. In 1987, Takeshita became head of the Liberal Democratic Party and succeeded Yasuhiro Nakasone as prime minister. He inherited the powerful LDP faction of Kakuei Tanaka, and was dubbed the "last shadow shogun" for his behind-the-scenes influence in politics. Takeshita was forced to resign in 1989 after being implicated in the Recruit scandal, but continued to lead the largest LDP faction until his death in 2000. He was the last prime minister to serve during the rule of Emperor Shōwa.

== Early life and education ==
Noboru Takeshita was born on 26 February 1924, in present-day Unnan, Shimane Prefecture, the only son of Yūzō Takeshita, a sake brewer, and his first wife, Yuiko. His family had been sake brewers for generations, and Takeshita was the 20th head of the Takeshita brewing family. Both his father Yūzō and his grandfather Gizō had been men of high repute in the region, and Takeshita followed in their footsteps and decided to become a politician when he was in junior high school.

Takeshita attended Waseda University in Tokyo.

He married Masae Takeuchi prior to joining the Imperial Japanese Army to serve as an instructor during World War II. His wife committed suicide while he was away for the war, which author Jacob Schlesinger argued made Takeshita obsessive about his composure and highly reserved about showing anger to others.

After the war, he remarried, to Naoko Endō, a distant relative, and worked as an English teacher and managed a high school judo team before entering politics in 1951. As a young judo competitor, he was known as "master of the draw" for his ability to avoid easy victories over weaker opponents and to avert defeat by stronger opponents.

== Political career ==
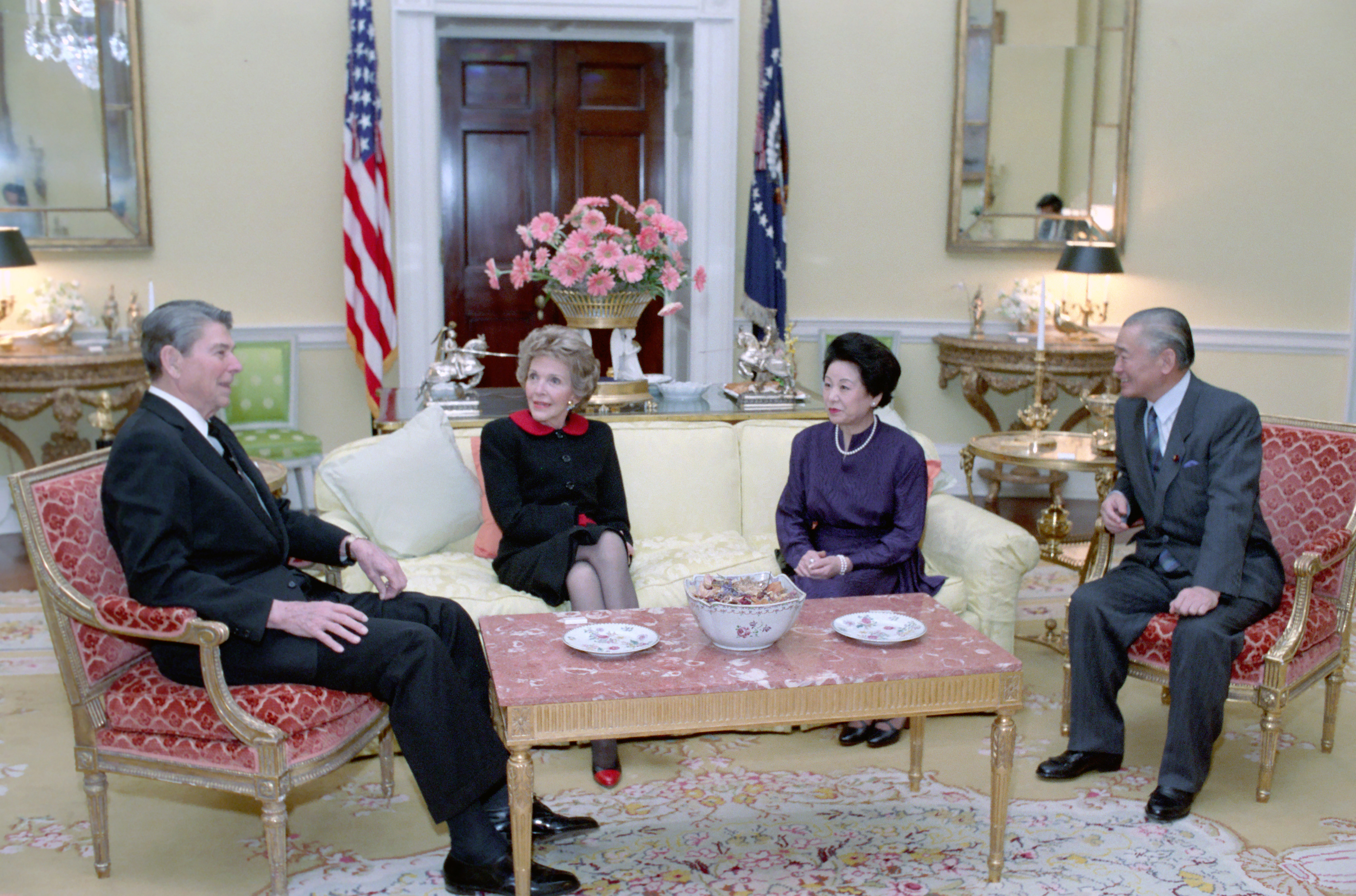
Takeshita and his wife with President Ronald Reagan and First Lady Nancy Reagan in 1988

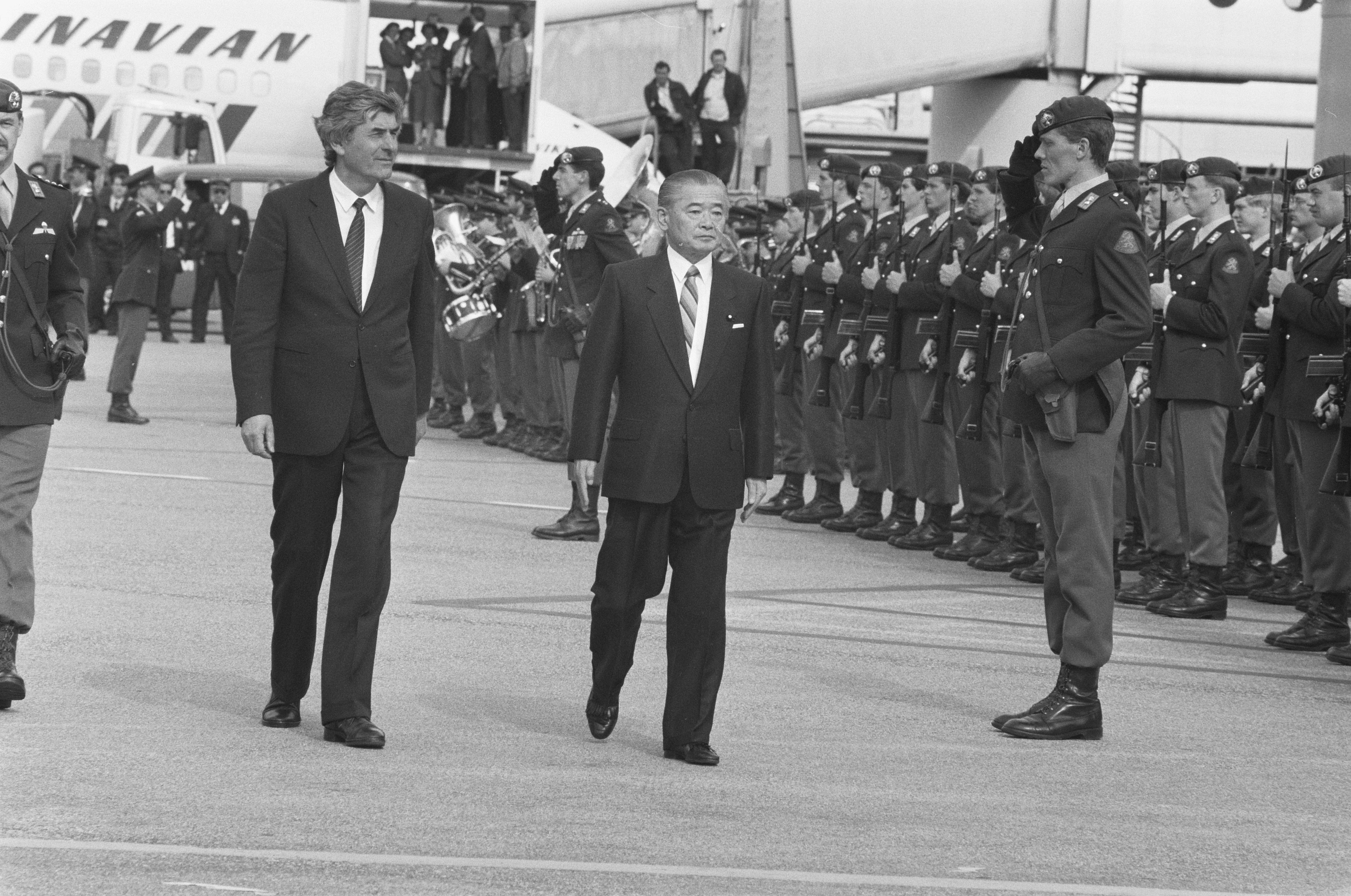
Takeshita with Ruud Lubbers in 1988

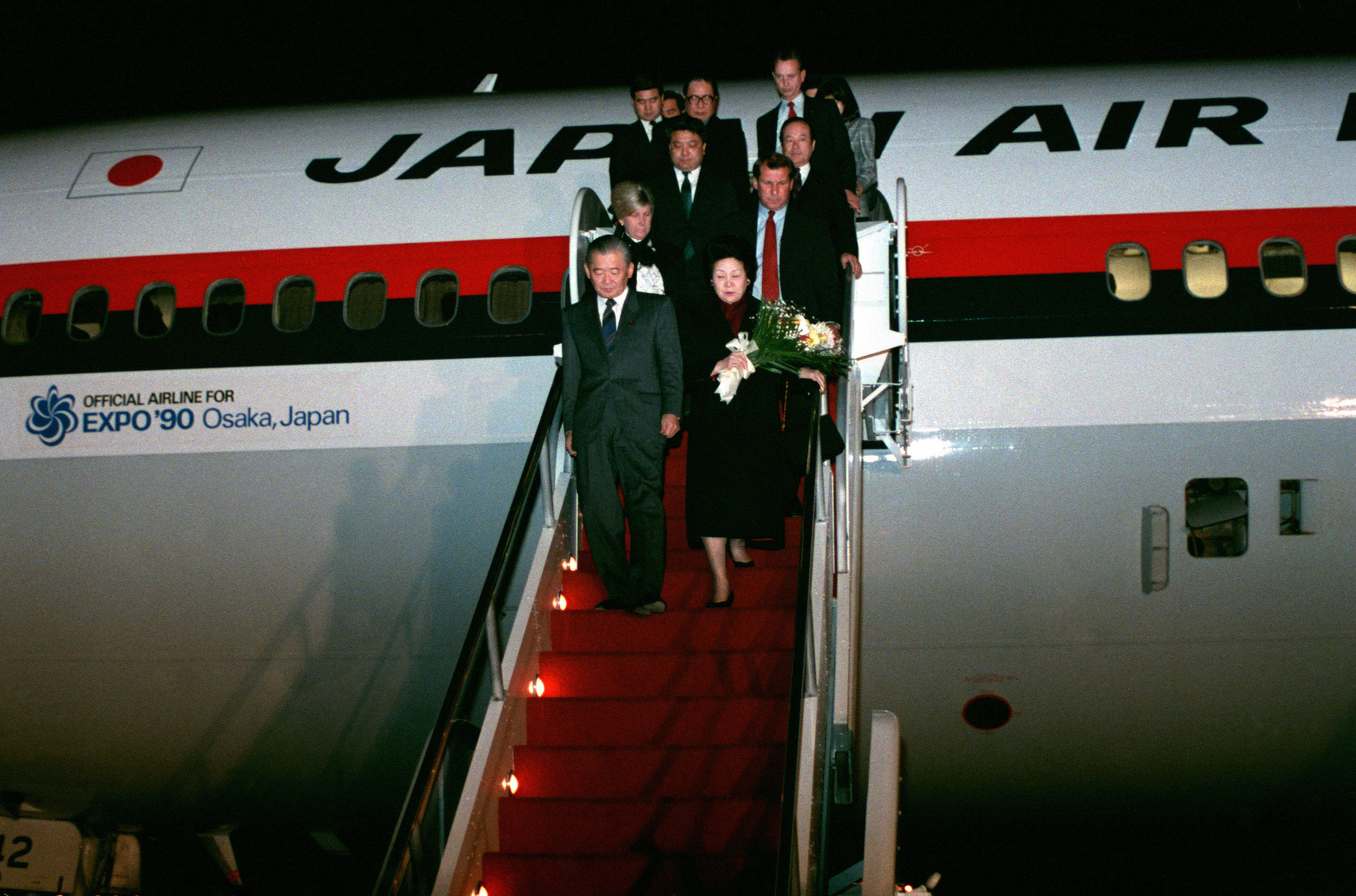
Takeshita and his wife disembarking from a Japan Airlines DC-10 (at Andrews AFB in 1989)

Takeshita served as a local assemblyman in Shimane Prefecture from 1951. In the 1958 general election he won a seat in the House of Representatives, joining the powerful faction of Kakuei Tanaka in the Liberal Democratic Party. He was elected at the same time as Shin Kanemaru, and the two remained close allies through their respective political careers. Takeshita eventually became Tanaka's primary fundraiser, traveling the country to garner support for the LDP's coffers. Like Tanaka, Takeshita was fond of "pork barrel" politics, retaining his own seat by bringing excessively huge public works projects to Shimane. Takeshita served as chief cabinet secretary from 1971 to 1974 and as minister of construction in 1976.

Takeshita was the minister of finance from 1979 to 1980, and he again accepted the finance position and was in office from 1982 to 1986. In this period, he achieved prominence as Japan's negotiator during deliberations which led to the agreement which is known as the Plaza Accord in New York. In the period Takeshita was finance minister, the Yen appreciated relative to other international currencies. The rise of the strong Yen (endaka) enhanced Japan's status as a financial powerhouse and led to the Japanese asset price bubble of the 1980s.

Kakuei Tanaka was arrested in connection with the Lockheed bribery scandals in 1976 and found guilty by a lower court in 1983, placing pressure on his political strength. In February 1985, Takeshita formed a "study group" called Soseikai, which counted among its ranks 43 of the 121 Tanaka faction members. Weeks after this defection, Tanaka suffered a stroke and became hospitalized, sparking further uncertainty over the future of his faction. Tanaka never recovered from his stroke, and by July 1987, Takeshita's faction counted 113 of the 143 Tanaka faction members, while only thirteen supported Takeshita's rival Susumu Nikaido. The Tanaka faction members who moved to Takeshita's faction included Ichiro Ozawa, Tsutomu Hata, Ryutaro Hashimoto, Keizo Obuchi and Kozo Watanabe.

In July 1986, Takeshita left the Cabinet and was named to the key post of secretary general of the party.

== Premiership (1987–1989) ==
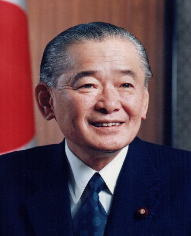
- Premiership of Noboru Takeshita; 6 November 1987 – 3 June 1989
- Monarchs: Emperor Shōwa; Emperor Akihito
- Cabinet: Takeshita Cabinet
- Party: Liberal Democratic
- Seat: Naikaku Sōri Daijin Kantei
- Constituency: Shimane at-large
- Emblem of the Government of Japan

In November 1987, Takeshita became president of the LDP and was thus elected Prime Minister of Japan, replacing Yasuhiro Nakasone. Among the highlights of the period in which Takeshita led the government, he acknowledged that Japan had been an aggressor during World War II. This statement was part of a speech in the Japanese Diet. Takeshita attended the third annual ASEAN summit in Manila in December 1987 and formalised a $2 billion development fund package in order to help stimulate ASEAN economies, continuing previous efforts at enhancing Japanese relations with Southeast Asian countries. Takeshita also pursued diplomacy in the rest of the world, including tours of several western nations as well as discussions for debt forgiveness to developing countries. Takeshita's initial tenure was relatively comfortable due to steady success in the Japanese economy at the time, but soon his administration began to see some issues. The number of unskilled foreign workers (from areas such as the Philippines and Bangladesh) doubled between 1986 and 1988, and the American government passed into law the Omnibus Trade Bill, which threatened Japanese exports to the country. Moreover, despite Takeshita's diplomatic gestures, trade imbalance with both Western Europe and East Asia continued to widen, leading to friction between the Japanese and foreign governments.

Takeshita was mainly remembered within Japan for implementing the country's first consumption tax, which his government forced through the Diet in 1988 amid public opposition. His government also passed legislation liberalizing the beef, citrus and rice markets, and passed an enhanced security pact with the United States, with the support of Shin Kanemaru who bought the opposition's support.

The Recruit scandal forced Takeshita to resign in 1989.

=== Economics ===
The economic policies of him and his two successors are seen as part of the neoliberal cycle by Post keynesians. He advocated for deregulation.

== Later years and death ==
Although Takeshita was accused of insider trading and corruption, he was never charged and was able to retain his seat in the Diet until shortly before his death. He remained a major behind-the-scenes player in the LDP, mentoring future prime ministers Sōsuke Uno, Toshiki Kaifu, and Keizō Obuchi. Tsutomu Hata and Ichiro Ozawa left Takeshita's faction to form the Japan Renewal Party. Keizo Obuchi inherited what was left of the faction, supported the election of Ryutaro Hashimoto as prime minister, and himself became prime minister from 1999 to 2000; he died of a stroke in early 2000 and Hashimoto took over control of the faction.

Takeshita himself died of respiratory failure in June 2000 after over a year in hospital, during which time he was said to have "masterminded" the coalition between the LDP and New Komeito and to have arranged the election of Prime Minister Yoshiro Mori from his hospital bed. He had planned to retire from the Diet as of the 2000 general election, which occurred just days after his death. The Economist characterized his death as the end of an era that was "a dizzy mixture of brilliance and corruption" in Japanese politics.

Hashimoto led the former Takeshita faction until refusing to stand in the 2005 general election due to a fundraising scandal, and died shortly thereafter. The remnants of the faction, formally known by this time as Heisei Kenkyūkai (Heisei Research Council), remained active under the leadership of Yūji Tsushima, who resigned prior to the 2009 general election, passing control to Fukushiro Nukaga. The faction raised much less in donations during the 1990s and 2000s than it did under Tanaka and Takeshita in the 1980s, as electoral reforms enacted in 1994, coupled with new campaign finance regulations and the ongoing economic slump that followed the Japanese asset price bubble, weakened the power of factions in Japanese politics.

== Personal life ==
Takeshita was twice married, and survived by three daughters (his only son, Rikidō, died one month after his birth in 1954) and several grandchildren, including singer Daigo (formerly known as Daigo☆Stardust) and manga artist Eiki Eiki.

His younger half-brother, Wataru (1946–2021) was a reporter with NHK, who then began working for Noboru as an aide in 1985. Wataru entered politics in 2000 and served as leader of his old Takeshita faction (now known as the Heisei Kenkyūkai faction) from 2018 until his death in September 2021. Takeshita's two other younger half-siblings were Saburō (born 1948) and Sakae.

== Honours ==
- Grand Cordon of the Order of the Chrysanthemum (20 June 2000; posthumous)
- Golden Pheasant Award of the Scout Association of Japan (1991)

Political offices
Preceded by Shigeru Hori	Chief Cabinet Secretary; 1971–1972	Succeeded by Susumu Nikaido
Preceded by Susumu Nikaido	Chief Cabinet Secretary; 1974	Succeeded by Ichitaro Ide
Preceded by Tadao Kariya	Minister of Construction; 1976	Succeeded by Tatsui Chuma
Preceded by Ippei Kaneko	Minister of Finance; 1979–1980	Succeeded by Michio Watanabe
Preceded by Michio Watanabe	Minister of Finance; 1982–1986	Succeeded by Kiichi Miyazawa
Preceded by Yasuhiro Nakasone	Prime Minister of Japan; 1987–1989	Succeeded by Sōsuke Uno
Party political offices
Preceded by Shin Kanemaru	Secretary-General of the Liberal Democratic Party; 1986–1987	Succeeded by Shintaro Abe
Preceded by Yasuhiro Nakasone	President of the Liberal Democratic Party; 1987-1989	Succeeded by Sosuke Uno
