= Hanako Jimi =

Japanese politician

- 自見 英子
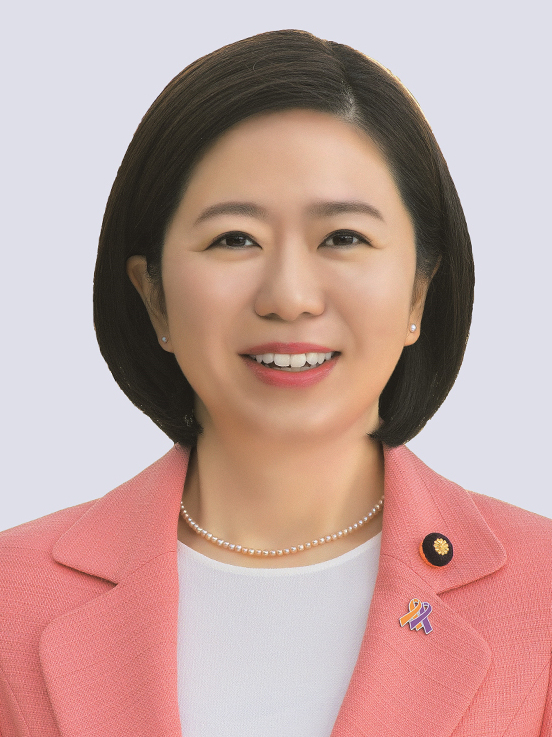
- Official portrait, 2022

Minister of State for Okinawa and Northern Territories Affairs Minister of State for Regional Revitalization Minister of State for Ainu-Related Policies Minister for the World Expo 2025
- In office 13 September 2023 – 1 October 2024
- Prime Minister: Fumio Kishida
- Preceded by: Naoki Okada
- Succeeded by: Yoshitaka Itō

Minister for Consumer Affairs and Food Safety
- In office 13 September 2023 – 1 October 2024
- Prime Minister: Fumio Kishida
- Preceded by: Taro Kono
- Succeeded by: Yoshitaka Itō

Member of the House of Councillors
- Incumbent
- Assumed office 26 July 2016
- Constituency: National PR

Personal details
- Born: 15 February 1976 (age 50) Sasebo, Nagasaki, Japan
- Party: Liberal Democratic
- Spouse: Gaku Hashimoto (m. 2021)
- Children: 4
- Parent: Shozaburo Jimi (father)
- Relatives: Ryutaro Hashimoto (father-in-law); Daijiro Hashimoto (uncle-in-law)
- Education: University of Tsukuba; Tokai University
- Occupation: Pediatrician • Politician

Hanako Jimi (自見 英子, Jimi Hanako; born 15 February 1976) is a Japanese politician who has served as Minister of State for Okinawa and Northern Territories Affairs, Minister of State for Regional Revitalization, Minister of State for Ainu-Related Policies, and Minister for the World Expo 2025 since September 2023. She is a member of the Liberal Democratic Party and she also serves in the House of Councillors of Japan.

== Biography ==
She was elected in 2016, and re-elected in 2022.
