= Hashimoto Cabinet =

Hashimoto Cabinet may refer to:

- First Hashimoto Cabinet, the Japanese majority government led by Ryutaro Hashimoto in 1996
- Second Hashimoto Cabinet, the Japanese majority government led by Ryutaro Hashimoto from 1996 to 1998
