= 1997 Liberal Democratic Party presidential election =

- 11 September 1997
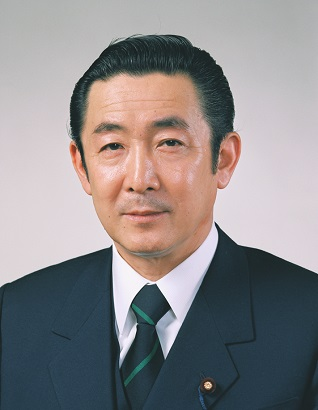
Candidate	Ryutaro Hashimoto
Leader's seat	Okayama 4th
LDP MPs	Unopposed
Party members	Unopposed
Total	Unopposed
President before election
Ryutaro Hashimoto
Elected President
Ryutaro Hashimoto

The 1997 Liberal Democratic Party presidential election was held on 11 September 1997 to elect the President of the Liberal Democratic Party of Japan (LDP).

This election was held upon the expiration of the term of office following the 1995 Liberal Democratic Party presidential election. As there were no candidates other than the incumbent, Ryutaro Hashimoto, he was re-elected unopposed for a full two year term. The election also determined the Prime Minister of Japan as the LDP was the largest party in the House of Representatives.
