= Saga at-large district =

Japanese House of Councillors constituency

- 佐賀県選挙区
- Parliamentary constituency for the House of Councillors
- Prefecture: Saga
- Electorate: 672,859 (as of September 2022)

Current constituency
- Created: 1947
- Seats: 2
- Councillors: Class of 2019: Yuhei Yamashita (LDP); Class of 2022: Takamaro Fukuoka (LDP)

The Saga at-large district is an electoral district of the Japanese House of Councillors covering Saga prefecture in Kyushu. It has historically elected primarily members of the Liberal Democratic Party.

== Current Councillors ==
The Councillors currently representing Saga are:

- Takamaro Fukuoka (Liberal Democratic Party (LDP)), elected to his first term in 2010, which will end in 2016. Previously served one term in the House of Representatives representing the Saga 1st district.
- Yuhei Yamashita (LDP); elected to his first term in 2013, which will end in 2019.

== Elected Councillors ==
Class of 1947	Election year	Class of 1950
(1947: 6-year term)	Election year	(1947: 3-year term)
Eizaemon Fukagawa (Democratic)	1947	Masaki Imaizumi (JLP)
Eizaemon Fukagawa (Democratic)	1950	Arata Sugihara (Liberal)
Heiichi Matsuoka (Liberal)	1953	Arata Sugihara (Liberal)
Heiichi Matsuoka (Liberal)	1956	Arata Sugihara (Ind.)
Naotsugu Mabeshima (LDP) (Note: Died in office 16 November 1981)	1959	Arata Sugihara (Ind.)
Naotsugu Mabeshima (LDP)	1962	Arata Sugihara (LDP)
Naotsugu Mabeshima (LDP)	1965	Arata Sugihara (LDP)
Naotsugu Mabeshima (LDP)	1968	Arata Sugihara (LDP)
Naotsugu Mabeshima (LDP)	1971	Arata Sugihara (LDP)
Naotsugu Mabeshima (LDP)	1974	Hidemaro Fukuoka (LDP)
Naotsugu Mabeshima (LDP)	1977	Hidemaro Fukuoka (LDP)
Naotsugu Mabeshima (LDP)	1980	Hidemaro Fukuoka (LDP)
Kenichiro Otsubo (LDP) (Note: Resigned 19 June 1986)	1982 by-election (Note: Held 10 January 1982)	Hidemaro Fukuoka (LDP)
Kenichiro Otsubo (LDP)	1983	Hidemaro Fukuoka (LDP)
Kenichiro Otsubo (LDP)	1986	Seijiro Otsuka (LDP) (Note: Died in office 3 October 1995)
Makoto Miike (LDP) (Note: Died in office 20 February 1988)	1986 by-election (Note: Held 10 August 1986)	Seijiro Otsuka (LDP)
Takao Jinnouchi (LDP)	1988 by-election (Note: Held 10 April 1988)	Seijiro Otsuka (LDP)
Takao Jinnouchi (LDP)	1989	Seijiro Otsuka (LDP)
Takao Jinnouchi (LDP)	1992	Seijiro Otsuka (LDP)
Takao Jinnouchi (LDP)	1995	Seijiro Otsuka (LDP)
Takao Jinnouchi (LDP)	1995 by-election (Note: Held 19 November 1995)	Hiromi Iwanaga (LDP)
Takao Jinnouchi (LDP)	1998	Hiromi Iwanaga (LDP)
Takao Jinnouchi (LDP)	2001	Hiromi Iwanaga (LDP)
Takao Jinnouchi (LDP)	2004	Hiromi Iwanaga (LDP)
Minoru Kawasaki (DPJ)	2007	Hiromi Iwanaga (LDP)
Minoru Kawasaki (DPJ)	2010	Takamaro Fukuoka (LDP)
Yuhei Yamashita (LDP)	2013	Takamaro Fukuoka (LDP)
Yuhei Yamashita (LDP)	2016	Takamaro Fukuoka (LDP)
Yuhei Yamashita (LDP)	2019	Takamaro Fukuoka (LDP)
Yuhei Yamashita (LDP)	2022	Takamaro Fukuoka (LDP)

== Election results ==
2013
Party	Candidate	Votes	%	±%
LDP	Yuhei Yamashita (endorsed by Komeito)	223,810	64.6	
Democratic	Kazunori Aoki	83,447	24.1	
JCP	Yasutoshi Kamimura	30,920	8.9	
Happiness Realization	Toru Nakshima	8,067	2.3	
Turnout				

2010
Party	Candidate	Votes	%	±%
LDP	Takamaro Fukuoka	256,673	60.5	
Democratic	Michiko Kakki (Endorsed by People's New Party)	143,540	33.8	
JCP	Katsuhiro Yamaguchi	23,974	5.7	
Turnout				

2007
Party	Candidate	Votes	%	±%
Democratic	Minoru Kawasaki (Endorsed by People's New Party)	210,452	49.6	
LDP	Yoshiyuki Kawakami (Endorsed by Komeito)	189,212	44.6	
JCP	Junko Nakao	25,028	5.9	
Turnout				

2004
Party	Candidate	Votes	%	±%
LDP	Hiromi Iwanaga (Endorsed by Komeito)	197,100	47.7	
Democratic	Minoru Kawasaki	177,139	42.9	
JCP	Akemi Muto	39,101	9.5	
Turnout				

== See also ==
- List of districts of the House of Councillors of Japan

Saga Prefecture districts for the House of Representatives:

- Saga 1st district
- Saga 2nd district
- Saga 3rd district
