= Minoru Kawasaki =

Minoru Kawasaki may refer to:

- Minoru Kawasaki (film director) (河崎 実, born 1958)
- Minoru Kawasaki (politician) (川崎 稔, born 1961)
