= Obuchi cabinet =

Cabinet of the Japanese government,1998–2000

- 84th Cabinet of Japan

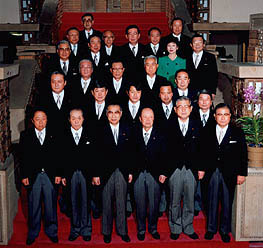
- Prime Minister Keizō Obuchi (front row, centre) with the newly-elected cabinet inside the Kantei, July 30, 1998
- Date formed: July 30, 1998
- Date dissolved: January 14, 1999

People and organisations
- Emperor: Akihito
- Prime Minister: Keizō Obuchi; Acting: Mikio Aoki (April 3 – April 5, 2000)
- Member party: LDP (1998-99); LDP-LP (1999); LDP-LP-NKP (1999-2000); LDP-NCP-NKP (2000)
- Status in legislature: HR majority, HC minority government (Twisted Diet) (1998-99); Majority coalition (1999-2000)
- Opposition party: Democratic Party of Japan
- Opposition leader: Naoto Kan (until September 25, 1999); Yukio Hatoyama (from September 25, 1999)

History
- Predecessor: Hashimoto II (Reshuffle)
- Successor: Obuchi (First Reshuffle)

The Obuchi cabinet governed Japan from July 1998 to April 2000 under the leadership of Prime Minister Keizō Obuchi, who took office after winning the Liberal Democratic Party leadership. Initially a continued LDP single-party government without legislative majority in parliament on its own after the 1998 election, it expanded to become a coalition involving first the Liberal Party and then the New Komeito over the course of its term. The government focused on economic revival, with former Prime Minister Kiichi Miyazawa recalled to the position of Finance Minister, and introduced policies designed to stimulate the economy through tax cuts and public spending increases.

Obuchi reshuffled his cabinet twice, firstly in January 1999 after having negotiated a coalition agreement with the Liberal Party. This did not bring about any major change in personnel other than to bring Liberal Takeshi Noda into government as Home Minister, and reduce the number of ministers by doubling up portfolios. The second reshuffle in October 1999 was a more substantial reconstruction, and took place following Obuchi's re-election as LDP president. At the same time, the coalition expanded again to include the New Komeito, beginning the long-running LDP-NKP partnership. The coalition continued until April 2000 when Liberal Leader Ichirō Ozawa decided to withdraw from the arrangement, causing a section of the Liberal Party to break away and form the New Conservative Party, which remained in the government.

The Obuchi cabinet ended in early April 2000 when Obuchi fell into a coma after suffering a serious, and ultimately fatal stroke. With the Prime Minister unable to discharge his duties, Chief Cabinet Secretary Mikio Aoki served as Acting Prime Minister for several days, until the cabinet determined to resign and Yoshirō Mori was chosen to replace Obuchi.

== Election of the prime minister ==
Obuchi's election demonstrated how the Diet was divided following the 1998 upper house election. In the House of Representatives, Obuchi was elected on the first ballot, however the first ballot in the House of Councillors did not produce a majority for any candidate. In the subsequent runoff vote, opposition leader Naoto Kan won with the support of all opposition parties allied against the LDP. This did not affect Obuchi's appointment as Prime Minister, as the constitution stipulates that in such a scenario, the will of the lower house prevails.

30 July 1998
House of Representatives Absolute majority (251/500) required
Choice	First Vote
Choice	Votes
Keizō Obuchi	268 / 500
Naoto Kan	164 / 500
Others and Abstentions (Including Speaker and Deputy)	68 / 500
Source Diet Minutes - 143rd Session (Representatives)

30 July 1998
House of Councillors Absolute majority (127/252) required
Choice	First Vote
Choice	Votes
Keizō Obuchi	103 / 252
Naoto Kan	98 / 252
Others and Abstentions (Including Speaker and Deputy)	51 / 252
Source Diet Minutes - 143rd Session (Councillors)

30 July 1998
House of Councillors Simple majority required
Choice	Runoff Vote
Choice	Votes
Naoto Kan	142 / 252
Keizō Obuchi	103 / 252
Others and Abstentions (Including Speaker and Deputy)	7 / 252
Source Diet Minutes - 143rd Session (Both houses)

== Ministers ==
Liberal Democratic
Liberal (1998)
New Komeito
Independent
R = Member of the House of Representatives
C = Member of the House of Councillors

=== Cabinet ===
Cabinet of Keizō Obuchi from July 30, 1998, to January 14, 1999
Portfolio	Minister		Term of Office
Prime Minister	Keizō Obuchi	R	July 30, 1998 - April 5, 2000
Minister of Justice	Shozaburo Nakamura	R	July 30, 1998 - March 8, 1999
Minister of Foreign Affairs	Masahiko Kōmura	R	July 30, 1998 - October 5, 1999
Minister of Finance	Kiichi Miyazawa	R	July 30, 1998 - April 26, 2001
Minister of Education	Akito Arima	C	July 30, 1998 - October 5, 1999
Minister of Health and Welfare	Sohei Miyashita	R	July 30, 1998 - October 5, 1999
Minister of Agriculture, Forestry and Fisheries	Shōichi Nakagawa	R	July 30, 1998 - October 5, 1999
Minister of International Trade and Industry	Kaoru Yosano	R	July 30, 1998 - October 5, 1999
Minister of Transport	Jirō Kawasaki	R	July 30, 1998 - October 5, 1999
Minister of Posts and Telecommunications	Seiko Noda	R	July 30, 1998 - October 5, 1999
Minister of Labour	Akira Amari	R	July 30, 1998 - January 14, 1999
Minister of Construction	Katsutsugu Sekiya	R	July 30, 1998 - October 5, 1999
Minister of Home Affairs; Director of the National Public Safety Commission	Mamoru Nishida	R	July 30, 1998 - January 14, 1999
Chief Cabinet Secretary	Hiromu Nonaka	R	July 30, 1998 - October 5, 1999
Director of the Management and Coordination Agency	Seiichi Ota	R	July 30, 1998 - October 5, 1999
Director of the Hokkaido Development Agency; Director of the Okinawa Development Agency	Kichio Inoue	C	July 30, 1998 - January 14, 1999
Director of the Japan Defense Agency	Fukushiro Nukaga	R	July 30, 1998 - November 21, 1998
Director of the Japan Defense Agency	Hosei Norota	R	November 21, 1998 - October 5, 1999
Director of the Economic Planning Agency	Taichi Sakaiya	-	July 30, 1998 - December 5, 2000
Director of the Science and Technology Agency	Yutaka Takeyama	C	July 30, 1998 - January 14, 1999
Director of the Environment Agency	Kenji Manabe	C	July 30, 1998 - October 5, 1999
Director of the National Land Agency	Hakuo Yanagisawa	R	July 30, 1998 - October 23, 1998
Director of the National Land Agency	Kichio Inoue	C	October 23, 1998 - January 14, 1999
Minister of State for Financial Reconstruction	Hakuo Yanagisawa	R	October 23, 1998 - December 15, 1998
Chairman of the Financial Reconstruction Commission	Hakuo Yanagisawa	R	December 15, 1998 - October 5, 1999
Deputy Secretaries
Deputy Chief Cabinet Secretary (Political Affairs - House of Representatives)	Muneo Suzuki	R	July 30, 1998 - October 5, 1999
Deputy Chief Cabinet Secretary (Political Affairs - House of Councillors)	Mitsuhiro Uesugi	C	July 30, 1998 - October 5, 1999
Deputy Chief Cabinet Secretary (Bureaucrat)	Teijiro Furukawa	-	February 24, 1995 - September 22, 2003

==== Changes ====
- October 23 - Hakuo Yanagisawa the Director of the National Land Agency was moved to become the Minister of State for Financial Reconstruction (which later became the Chairman of the Financial Reconstruction Commission) and was replaced with Yoshio Inoue, who doubled up as Hokkaido and Okinawa development minister.
- November 21 - Fukushiro Nukaga resigned as Defence Minister due to a corruption scandal, he was replaced with Hosei Norota.

=== First reshuffled cabinet ===
Obuchi cabinet (First Reshuffle)
- 84th Cabinet of Japan

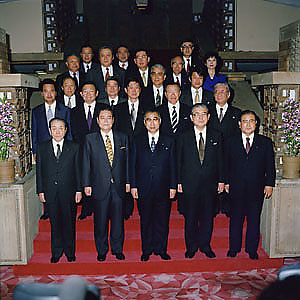
- Prime Minister Keizō Obuchi (front row, centre) with his reshuffled cabinet inside the Kantei, January 14, 1999
- Date formed: January 14, 1999
- Date dissolved: October 5, 1999

People and organisations
- Emperor: Akihito
- Prime Minister: Keizō Obuchi; Acting: Mikio Aoki (April 3 – April 5, 2000)
- Member party: LDP (1998-99); LDP-LP (1999); LDP-LP-NKP (1999-2000); LDP-NCP-NKP (2000)
- Status in legislature: HR majority, HC minority government (Twisted Diet) (1998-99); Majority coalition (1999-2000)
- Opposition party: Democratic Party of Japan
- Opposition leader: Naoto Kan (until September 25, 1999); Yukio Hatoyama (from September 25, 1999)

History
- Predecessor: Obuchi
- Successor: Obuchi (Second Reshuffle)

Cabinet of Keizō Obuchi from January 14, 1999, to October 5, 1999
Portfolio	Minister		Term of Office
Prime Minister	Keizō Obuchi	R	July 30, 1998 - April 5, 2000
Minister of Justice	Shozaburo Nakamura	R	July 30, 1998 - March 8, 1999
Minister of Justice	Takao Jinnouchi	C	March 8, 1999 - October 5, 1999
Minister of Foreign Affairs	Masahiko Kōmura	R	July 30, 1998 - October 5, 1999
Minister of Finance	Kiichi Miyazawa	R	July 30, 1998 - April 26, 2001
Minister of Education; Director of the Science and Technology Agency	Akito Arima	C	July 30, 1998 - October 5, 1999
Minister of Health and Welfare	Sohei Miyashita	R	July 30, 1998 - October 5, 1999
Minister of Agriculture, Forestry and Fisheries	Shōichi Nakagawa	R	July 30, 1998 - October 5, 1999
Minister of International Trade and Industry	Kaoru Yosano	R	July 30, 1998 - October 5, 1999
Minister of Transport; Director of the Hokkaido Development Agency	Jirō Kawasaki	R	July 30, 1998 - October 5, 1999
Minister of Posts and Telecommunications	Seiko Noda	R	July 30, 1998 - October 5, 1999
Minister of Labour	Akira Amari	R	July 30, 1998 - October 5, 1999
Minister of Construction; Director of the National Land Agency	Katsutsugu Sekiya	R	July 30, 1998 - October 5, 1999
Minister of Home Affairs; Director of the National Public Safety Commission	Takeshi Noda	R	January 14, 1999 - October 5, 1999
Chief Cabinet Secretary; Director of the Okinawa Development Agency	Hiromu Nonaka	R	July 30, 1998 - October 5, 1999
Director of the Management and Coordination Agency	Seiichi Ota	R	July 30, 1998 - October 5, 1999
Director of the Japan Defense Agency	Hosei Norota	R	November 21, 1998 - October 5, 1999
Director of the Economic Planning Agency	Taichi Sakaiya	-	July 30, 1998 - December 5, 2000
Director of the Environment Agency	Kenji Manabe	C	July 30, 1998 - October 5, 1999
Chairman of the Financial Reconstruction Commission	Hakuo Yanagisawa	R	December 15, 1998 - October 5, 1999
Deputy Secretaries
Deputy Chief Cabinet Secretary (Political Affairs - House of Representatives)	Muneo Suzuki	R	July 30, 1998 - October 5, 1999
Deputy Chief Cabinet Secretary (Political Affairs - House of Councillors)	Mitsuhiro Uesugi	C	July 30, 1998 - October 5, 1999
Deputy Chief Cabinet Secretary (Bureaucrat)	Teijiro Furukawa	-	February 24, 1995 - September 22, 2003

==== Changes ====
- March 8, 1999 - Minister of Justice Shozaburo Nakamura resigned over a controversy relating to actor Arnold Schwarzenegger being allowed to enter Japan without a passport, and was replaced by Takao Jinnouchi.

=== Second reshuffled cabinet ===
Obuchi cabinet (Second reshuffle)
- 84th Cabinet of Japan

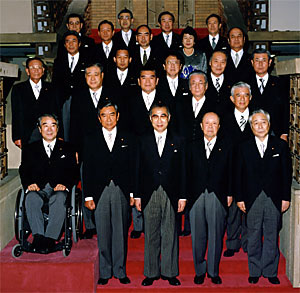
- Prime Minister Keizō Obuchi (front row, centre) with his reshuffled cabinet inside the Kantei, October 5, 1999
- Date formed: October 5, 1999
- Date dissolved: April 5, 2000

People and organisations
- Emperor: Akihito
- Prime Minister: Keizō Obuchi; Acting: Mikio Aoki (April 3 – April 5, 2000)
- Member party: LDP (1998-99); LDP-LP (1999); LDP-LP-NKP (1999-2000); LDP-NCP-NKP (2000)
- Status in legislature: HR majority, HC minority government (Twisted Diet) (1998-99); Majority coalition (1999-2000)
- Opposition cabinet: First Next Cabinet of Yukio Hatoyama
- Opposition party: Democratic Party of Japan
- Opposition leader: Naoto Kan (until September 25, 1999); Yukio Hatoyama (from September 25, 1999)

History
- Predecessor: Obuchi (First Reshuffle)
- Successor: Mori I

Cabinet of Keizō Obuchi from October 5, 1999, to April 5, 2000
Portfolio	Minister		Term of Office
Prime Minister	Keizō Obuchi	R	July 30, 1998 - April 5, 2000
Minister of Justice	Hideo Usui	R	October 5, 1999 - July 4, 2000
Minister of Foreign Affairs	Yōhei Kōno	R	October 5, 1999 - April 26, 2001
Minister of Finance	Kiichi Miyazawa	R	July 30, 1998 - April 26, 2001
Minister of Education; Director of the Science and Technology Agency	Hirofumi Nakasone	C	October 5, 1999 - July 4, 2000
Minister of Health and Welfare	Yuya Niwa	R	October 5, 1999 - July 4, 2000
Minister of Agriculture, Forestry and Fisheries	Tokuichiro Tamazawa	R	October 5, 1999 - July 4, 2000
Minister of International Trade and Industry	Takashi Fukaya	R	October 5, 1999 - July 4, 2000
Minister of Transport; Director of the Hokkaido Development Agency	Toshihiro Nikai	R	October 5, 1999 - July 4, 2000
Minister of Posts and Telecommunications	Eita Yashiro	R	October 5, 1999 - July 4, 2000
Minister of Labour	Takamori Makino	R	October 5, 1999 - July 4, 2000
Minister of Construction; Director of the National Land Agency	Masaaki Nakayama	R	October 5, 1999 - July 4, 2000
Minister of Home Affairs; Director of the National Public Safety Commission	Kosuke Hori	R	October 5, 1999 - July 4, 2000
Chief Cabinet Secretary; Director of the Okinawa Development Agency	Mikio Aoki	C	October 5, 1999 - July 4, 2000
Chairman of the Financial Reconstruction Commission	Michio Ochi	R	October 5, 1999 - February 25, 2000
Chairman of the Financial Reconstruction Commission	Sadakazu Tanigaki	R	February 25, 2000 - July 4, 2000
Director of the Management and Coordination Agency	Kunihiro Tsuzuki	C	October 5, 1999 - December 5, 2000
Director of the Japan Defense Agency	Tsutomu Kawara	R	October 5, 1999 - July 4, 2000
Director of the Economic Planning Agency	Taichi Sakaiya	-	July 30, 1998 - December 5, 2000
Director of the Environment Agency	Kayoko Shimizu	C	October 5, 1999 - July 4, 2000
Deputy Secretaries
Deputy Chief Cabinet Secretary (Political Affairs - House of Representatives)	Fukushiro Nukaga	R	October 5, 1999 - July 4, 2000
Deputy Chief Cabinet Secretary (Political Affairs - House of Councillors)	Soichiro Matsutani	C	October 5, 1999 - July 4, 2000
Deputy Chief Cabinet Secretary (Bureaucrat)	Teijiro Furukawa	-	February 24, 1995 - September 22, 2003

==== Changes ====
- February 25, 2000 - Chairman of the Financial Reconstruction Commission Michio Ochi resigned following controversial comments he made related to regulation and inspection of banks. He was replaced by Sadakazu Tanigaki.
- April 1, 2000 - Coalition negotiations between the Liberal Party and the LDP broke down leading to the party pulling out of the coalition. This caused a split, with some Liberals wishing to remain in government.
- April 2, 2000 - Prime Minister Obuchi suffered a debilitating stroke and fell into a coma. Chief Cabinet Secretary Mikio Aoki assumed his duties as Acting Prime Minister until April 5 when LDP Secretary-general Yoshiro Mori was appointed as replacement Prime Minister. Obuchi died on May 14.
- April 3, 2000 - The dissident Liberals launched the New Conservative Party under the leadership of Chikage Oogi, and remained in government under that banner, including Transport Minister Toshihiro Nikai.
