= Second Hashimoto cabinet =

Second Hashimoto Cabinet
- 83rd Cabinet of Japan

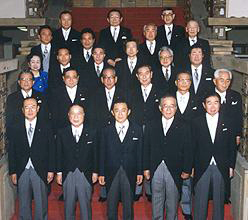
- Prime Minister Ryutaro Hashimoto (front row, centre) with the re-elected cabinet inside the Kantei, November 7, 1996
- Date formed: November 7, 1996
- Date dissolved: September 11, 1997

People and organisations
- Emperor: Akihito
- Prime Minister: Ryutaro Hashimoto
- Member party: Liberal Democratic Party Confidence and supply Social Democratic Party; New Party Sakigake
- Status in legislature: HoR: Minority government HoC: Minority government
- Opposition party: New Frontier Party (1996-97); Democratic Party (1997-98); Japanese Communist Party
- Opposition leader: Ichirō Ozawa (until December 31, 1997); Naoto Kan (from December 31, 1997)

History
- Election: 1996 Japanese general election
- Predecessor: First Hashimoto Cabinet
- Successor: Second Hashimoto Cabinet (Reshuffle)

The Second Hashimoto Cabinet governed Japan from November 1996 to July 1998 under the leadership of Ryutaro Hashimoto.

== Political background ==
Hashimoto had become Prime Minister in January 1996 at the head of a three-party coalition, and was returned to office in the general election of November 1996. While the coalition parties (the Liberal Democratic Party, the Social Democratic Party and the New Party Sakigake) won a slim majority in the House of Representatives, the SDP and NPS had seen their popularity collapse due to their association with the coalition, and decided to remain outside the government. Therefore, Hashimoto formed a minority, wholly LDP government (the first since 1993) with the promise of SDP and NPS support when he was elected by the National Diet on November 7. He promised to continue his policies of "six great reforms" in the areas of administration, financial markets, education, social security, fiscal policy and economic policy, and appointed several former ministers to cabinet to help achieve this.

Less than a year into Hashimoto's second term in September 1997, the LDP regained a slim majority in the lower house due to defections from, and eventual break up of the opposition New Frontier Party, although the government maintained its alliance with the SDP and NPS. Several days later, Hashimoto conducted a cabinet reshuffle, which backfired when he was severely criticised for his appointment of Koko Sato, who had been convicted of bribery in relation to the Lockheed Scandal. This criticism forced Sato to resign after only 11 days in office. The government was damaged further when Finance Minister Hiroshi Mitsuzuka resigned in January 1998 because of a corruption scandal that had been uncovered in the Finance Ministry. At the same time, as part of efforts to close the budget deficit, Hashimoto's government raised the consumption tax in 1998, which negatively affected consumer demand and caused a recession at a time of high unemployment.

By 1998 the poor economic situation, the backlash against economic reforms and the cabinet resignations had greatly diminished Hashimoto's popularity. In the 1998 House of Councillor's election, the LDP lost several seats, leaving the government in a minority. Hashimoto immediately resigned and was replaced by Foreign Minister Keizō Obuchi, who took office on July 30, 1998, and inaugurated the Obuchi Cabinet.

== Election of the prime minister ==
7 November 1996 Absolute majority required
House of Representatives
Choice	Runoff Vote
Choice	Votes
Ryutaro Hashimoto	262 / 500
Ichirō Ozawa	152 / 500
Others and Abstentions (Including Speaker and Deputy)	86 / 500
Source Diet Minutes - 138th Session

== List of ministers ==
Liberal Democratic
R = Member of the House of Representatives
C = Member of the House of Councillors

=== Cabinet ===
Cabinet of Ryutaro Hashimoto from November 7, 1996, to September 11, 1997
Portfolio	Minister		Term of office
Prime Minister	Ryutaro Hashimoto	R	January 11, 1996 - July 30, 1998
Minister of Justice	Isao Matsuura	C	November 7, 1996 - September 11, 1997
Minister of Foreign Affairs	Yukihiko Ikeda	R	January 11, 1996 - September 11, 1997
Minister of Finance	Hiroshi Mitsuzuka	R	November 7, 1996 - January 28, 1998
Minister of Education	Takashi Kosugi	R	November 7, 1996 - September 11, 1997
Minister of Health and Welfare	Junichiro Koizumi	R	November 7, 1996 - July 30, 1998
Minister of Agriculture, Forestry and Fisheries	Takao Fujimoto	R	November 7, 1996 - September 11, 1997
Minister of International Trade and Industry	Shinji Sato	R	November 7, 1996 - September 11, 1997
Minister of Transport	Makoto Koga	R	November 7, 1996 - September 11, 1997
Minister of Posts and Telecommunications	Hisao Horinōchi	R	November 7, 1996 - September 11, 1997
Minister of Labour	Yutaka Okano	C	November 7, 1996 - September 11, 1997
Minister of Construction	Shizuka Kamei	R	November 7, 1996 - September 11, 1997
Minister of Home Affairs; Director of the National Public Safety Commission	Katsuhiko Shirakawa	R	November 7, 1996 - September 11, 1997
Chief Cabinet Secretary	Seiroku Kajiyama	R	January 11, 1996 - September 11, 1997
Director of the Management and Coordination Agency	Kabun Mutō	R	November 7, 1996 - September 11, 1997
Director of the Hokkaido Development Agency; Director of the Okinawa Development Agency	Jitsuo Inagaki	R	November 7, 1996 - September 11, 1997
Director of the Japan Defense Agency	Fumio Kyūma	R	November 7, 1996 - July 30, 1998
Director of the Economic Planning Agency	Tarō Asō	R	November 7, 1996 - September 11, 1997
Director of the Science and Technology Agency	Riichiro Chikaoka	R	November 7, 1996 - September 11, 1997
Director of the Environment Agency	Michiko Ishii	C	November 7, 1996 - September 11, 1997
Director of the National Land Agency	Kosuke Ito	R	November 7, 1996 - September 11, 1997

=== Reshuffled cabinet ===
Second Hashimoto Cabinet (Reshuffle)
- 83rd Cabinet of Japan

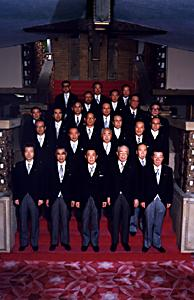
- Prime Minister Ryutaro Hashimoto (front row, centre) with his reshuffled cabinet inside the Kantei, September 11, 1997
- Date formed: September 11, 1997
- Date dissolved: July 30, 1998

People and organisations
- Emperor: Akihito
- Prime Minister: Ryutaro Hashimoto
- Member party: Liberal Democratic Party Confidence and supply Social Democratic Party; New Party Sakigake
- Status in legislature: HoR: Minority government HoC: Minority government
- Opposition party: New Frontier Party (1996-97); Democratic Party (1997-98); Democratic Party of Japan (1998); Japanese Communist Party; New Komeito
- Opposition leader: Ichirō Ozawa (until December 31, 1997); Naoto Kan (from December 31, 1997)

History
- Outgoing election: 1998 Japanese House of Councillors election
- Predecessor: Hashimoto II
- Successor: Obuchi

Cabinet of Ryutaro Hashimoto from September 11, 1997, to July 30, 1998
Portfolio	Minister		Term of office
Prime Minister	Ryutaro Hashimoto	R	January 11, 1996 - July 30, 1998
Minister of Justice	Kokichi Shimoinaba	C	September 11, 1997 - July 30, 1998
Minister of Foreign Affairs	Keizō Obuchi	R	September 11, 1997 - July 30, 1998
Minister of Finance	Hiroshi Mitsuzuka	R	November 7, 1996 - January 28, 1998
Minister of Finance	Hikaru Matsunaga	R	January 30, 1998 - July 30, 1998
Minister of Education	Nobutaka Machimura	R	September 11, 1997 - July 30, 1998
Minister of Health and Welfare	Junichiro Koizumi	R	November 7, 1996 - July 30, 1998
Minister of Agriculture, Forestry and Fisheries	Ihei Ochi	R	September 11, 1997 - September 25, 1997
Minister of Agriculture, Forestry and Fisheries	Yoshinobu Shimamura	R	September 26, 1997 - July 30, 1998
Minister of International Trade and Industry	Mitsuo Horiuchi	R	September 11, 1997 - July 30, 1998
Minister of Transport	Takao Fujii	R	September 11, 1997 - July 30, 1998
Minister of Posts and Telecommunications	Shozaburo Jimi	R	September 11, 1997 - July 30, 1998
Minister of Labour	Bunmei Ibuki	R	September 11, 1997 - July 30, 1998
Minister of Construction	Tsutomu Kawara	R	September 11, 1997 - July 30, 1998
Minister of Home Affairs; Director of the National Public Safety Commission	Mitsuhiro Uesugi	C	September 11, 1997 - July 30, 1998
Chief Cabinet Secretary	Kanezo Muraoka	R	September 11, 1997 - July 30, 1998
Director of the Management and Coordination Agency	Koko Sato	R	September 11, 1997 - September 22, 1997
Director of the Management and Coordination Agency	Sadatoshi Ozato	R	September 22, 1997 - July 30, 1998
Director of the Hokkaido Development Agency; Director of the Okinawa Development Agency	Muneo Suzuki	R	September 11, 1997 - July 30, 1998
Director of the Japan Defense Agency	Fumio Kyūma	R	November 7, 1996 - July 30, 1998
Director of the Economic Planning Agency	Kōji Omi	R	September 11, 1997 - July 30, 1998
Director of the Science and Technology Agency	Sadakazu Tanigaki	R	September 11, 1997 - July 30, 1998
Director of the Environment Agency	Hiroshi Oki	C	September 11, 1997 - July 30, 1998
Director of the National Land Agency	Hisaoki Kamei	R	September 11, 1997 - July 30, 1998

==== Changes ====
- September 22, 1997 - Director of the Management and Co-Ordination Agency, Koko Sato resigned due to criticism of a previous conviction for bribery in connection with the Lockheed Scandal and was replaced by Sadatoshi Ozato.
- September 27, 1997 - Agriculture Minister Ihei Ochi resigned after suffering a stroke and was replaced with Yoshinobu Shimamura.
- January 28, 1998 - Finance Minister Hiroshi Mitsuzuka resigned to take responsibility for departmental corruption and was replaced with Hikaru Matsunaga.
