= Iwanaga =

Iwanaga (written: 岩永) is a Japanese surname. Notable people with the surname include:

- Hiroaki Iwanaga (岩永 洋昭, born 1979), Japanese model and actor
- Hiromi Iwanaga (岩永 浩美, born 1942), Japanese politician
- Mineichi Iwanaga (岩永 峯一, born 1941), Japanese politician
- Rin Iwanaga (岩永 鈴, born 1999), Japanese badminton athlete
- Tetsuya Iwanaga (岩永 哲哉, born 1970), Japanese voice actor
