= Miyagi 3rd district =

- Parliamentary constituency for the Japanese House of Representatives
- Numbered map of the Miyagi Prefecture single seats
- Prefecture: Miyagi
- Proportional District: Tohoku
- Electorate: 276,350

Current constituency
- Created: 1994
- Seats: One
- Party: LDP
- Representative: Akihiro Nishimura
- Municipalities: Iwanuma, Kakuda, Natori, Shiroishi, Igu District, Katta District, Shibata District, and Watari District.

Miyagi 3rd district (宮城県第3区, Miyagi-ken dai-sanku or simply 宮城3区, Miyagi-sanku) is a single-member constituency of the House of Representatives in the national Diet of Japan located in Miyagi Prefecture.

== Areas covered ==
=== Since 2022 ===
- Iwanuma
- Kakuda
- Natori
- Shiroishi
- Igu District
- Katta District
- Shibata District
- Watari District

=== 2017 - 2022 ===
- Part of Sendai
  - Taihaku-ku (former Akiu area)
- Iwanuma
- Kakuda
- Natori
- Shiroishi
- Igu District
- Katta District
- Shibata District
- Watari District

=== 1994 - 2017 ===
- Iwanuma
- Kakuda
- Natori
- Shiroishi
- Igu District
- Katta District
- Shibata District
- Watari District

== List of representatives ==
Election	Representative	Party	Notes
1996	Hiroshi Mitsuzuka	LDP	
2000	Hiroshi Mitsuzuka	LDP	
2003	Akihiro Nishimura	LDP	
2005	Akihiro Nishimura	LDP	
2009	Kiyohito Hashimoto	Democratic	
2012	Akihiro Nishimura	LDP	
2014	Akihiro Nishimura	LDP	
2017	Akihiro Nishimura	LDP	
2021	Akihiro Nishimura	LDP	
2024	Tsuyoshi Yanagisawa	CDP	
2024	Tsuyoshi Yanagisawa	CRA	
2026	Akihiro Nishimura	LDP	

== Election results ==
=== 2026 ===
2026
Party	Candidate	Votes	%	±%
LDP	Akihiro Nishimura	83,705	54.72	
Centrist Reform	Tsuyoshi Yanagisawa	47,303	30.92	
Sanseitō	Moeko Hayashi	17,440	11.40	New
Independent	Takashi Yūki	3,412	2.23	New
Independent	Koji Asada	1,121	0.73	N/A
Majority		36,402	23.80	
Registered electors		275,158		
Turnout			56.85	▲1.81
LDP gain from Centrist Reform				

=== 2024 ===
2024
Party	Candidate	Votes	%	±%
CDP	Tsuyoshi Yanagisawa	82,566	55.24	
LDP	Akihiro Nishimura	66,906	44.76	
Majority		15,660	10.48	
Registered electors		277,931		
Turnout			55.04	▼2.67
CDP gain from LDP				

=== 2021 ===
2021
Party	Candidate	Votes	%	±%
LDP	Akihiro Nishimura	96,210	59.27	
CDP	Sonoko Ohno	60,237	37.11	New
Independent	Koji Asada	5,890	3.63	New
Majority		35,973	22.16	
Registered electors		286,936		
Turnout			57.71	▲3.65
LDP hold				

=== 2017 ===
2017
Party	Candidate	Votes	%	±%
LDP	Akihiro Nishimura	92,893	60.31	
Kibō no Tō	Yoshihiro Ichijo	40,670	26.40	New
JCP	Go Yoshida	20,469	13.29	
Majority		52,223	33.91	
Registered electors		292,288		
Turnout			54.06	▲3.49
LDP hold				

=== 2014 ===
2014
Party	Candidate	Votes	%	±%
LDP	Akihiro Nishimura	76,246	54.49	
Democratic	Kiyohito Hashimoto	48,957	34.99	
JCP	Go Yoshida	14,712	10.51	
Majority		27,289	19.50	
Registered electors		283,873		
Turnout			50.57	▼5.32
LDP hold				

=== 2012 ===
2012
Party	Candidate	Votes	%	±%
LDP	Akihiro Nishimura	88,801	58.24	
Democratic	Kiyohito Hashimoto	47,298	31.02	
JCP	Go Yoshida	16,370	10.74	N/A
Majority		41,503	27.22	
Registered electors		283,645		
Turnout			55.89	▼13.68
LDP gain from Democratic				

=== 2009 ===
2009
Party	Candidate	Votes	%	±%
Democratic	Kiyohito Hashimoto	108,718	55.04	
LDP	Akihiro Nishimura	85,897	43.49	
Happiness Realization	Mutsuaki Kobayashi	2,895	1.47	New
Majority		22,821	11.55	
Registered electors		289,304		
Turnout			69.57	▲3.06
Democratic gain from LDP				

=== 2005 ===
2005
Party	Candidate	Votes	%	±%
LDP	Akihiro Nishimura	98,269	52.26	
Democratic	Kiyohito Hashimoto	78,503	41.75	
JCP	Koji Takahashi	11,256	5.99	
Majority		19,766	10.51	
Registered electors		287,647		
Turnout			66.51	▲8.58
LDP hold				

=== 2003 ===
2003
Party	Candidate	Votes	%	±%
LDP	Akihiro Nishimura	74,045	46.35	
Democratic	Kiyohito Hashimoto (Won PR seat)	73,803	46.20	
JCP	Koji Takahashi	11,915	7.46	
Majority		242	0.15	
Registered electors		285,294		
Turnout			57.93	
LDP hold				

=== 2000 ===
2000
Party	Candidate	Votes	%	±%
LDP	Hiroshi Mitsuzuka	84,278	51.99	
Democratic	Katsuhiro Koyama	40,896	25.23	New
Liberal	Makoto Hori	22,501	13.88	New
JCP	Mikio Katō	14,429	8.90	
Majority		43,382	26.76	
Registered electors				
Turnout				
LDP hold				

=== 1996 ===
1996
Party	Candidate	Votes	%	±%
LDP	Hiroshi Mitsuzuka	81,784	53.14	New
New Frontier	Kenichi Mukade	53,150	34.53	New
JCP	Hiromi Otomo	18,972	12.33	New
Majority		28,634	18.61	
Registered electors				
Turnout				
LDP win (new seat)				
