= Akihiro Nishimura (politician) =

Japanese politician

- 西村 明宏
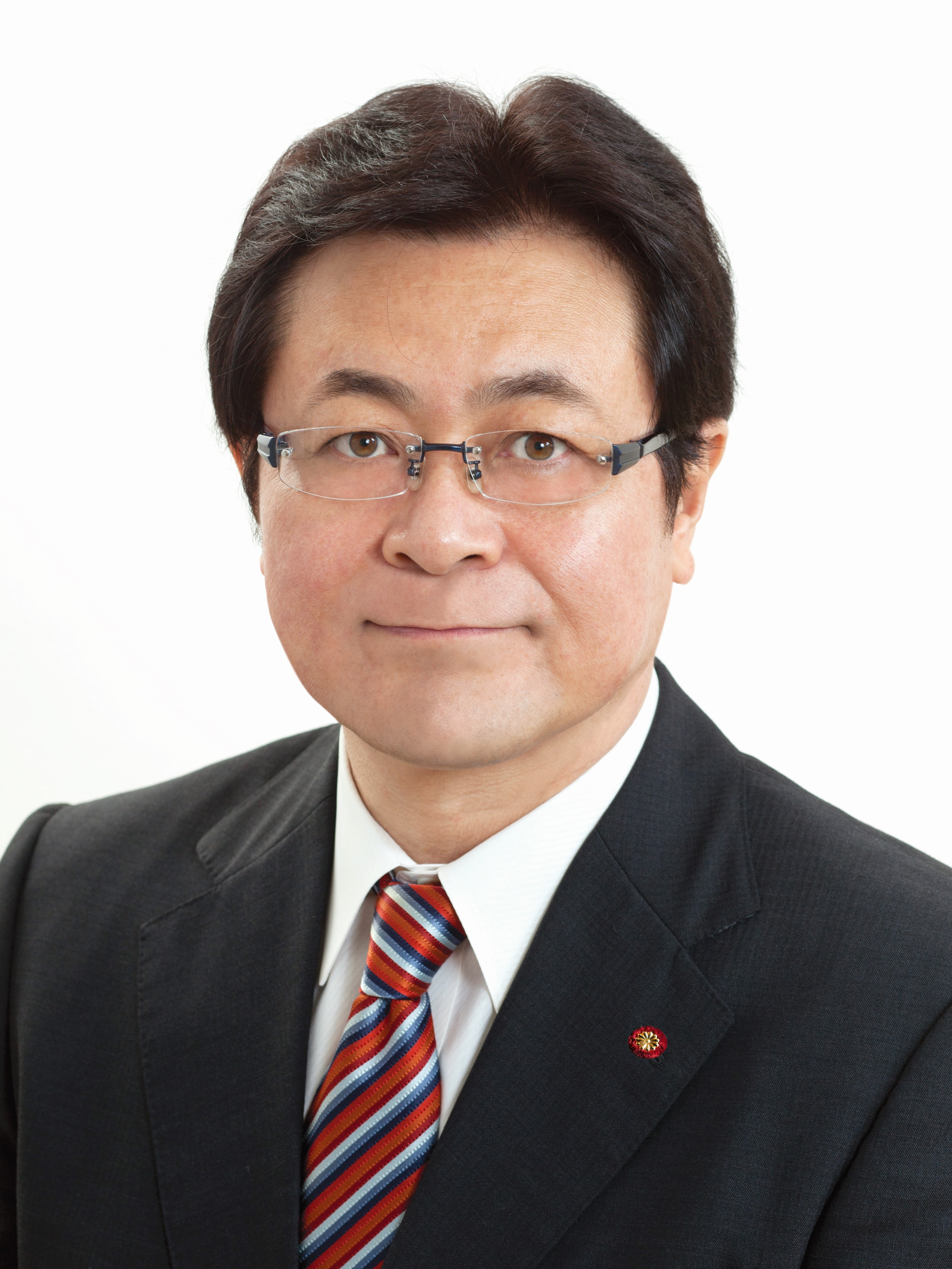
- Official portrait, 2012

Minister of the Environment
- In office 10 August 2022 – 13 September 2023
- Prime Minister: Fumio Kishida
- Preceded by: Tsuyoshi Yamaguchi
- Succeeded by: Shintaro Ito

Deputy Chief Cabinet Secretary (Political affairs, House of Representatives)
- In office 11 September 2019 – 16 September 2020
- Prime Minister: Shinzo Abe
- Preceded by: Yasutoshi Nishimura
- Succeeded by: Manabu Sakai

Member of the House of Representatives
- Incumbent
- Assumed office 9 February 2026
- Preceded by: Tsuyoshi Yanagisawa
- Constituency: Miyagi 3rd
- In office 16 December 2012 – 9 October 2024
- Preceded by: Kiyohito Hashimoto
- Succeeded by: Tsuyoshi Yanagisawa
- Constituency: Miyagi 3rd
- In office 9 November 2003 – 21 July 2009
- Preceded by: Hiroshi Mitsuzuka
- Succeeded by: Kiyohito Hashimoto
- Constituency: Miyagi 3rd

Personal details
- Born: 16 July 1960 (age 66) Kitakyūshū, Fukuoka, Japan
- Party: Liberal Democratic
- Education: Waseda University

Akihiro Nishimura (西村 明宏, Nishimura Akihiro; born 16 July 1960) is a Japanese politician of the Liberal Democratic Party and a member of the House of Representatives in the Diet (national legislature).

== Biography ==
A native of Kitakyūshū, Fukuoka he attended Waseda University as both undergraduate and graduate students.

In 2003, he was elected to the Diet for the first time.

Political offices
Preceded by Tsuyoshi Yamaguchi	Minister of the Environment; 2022–2023	Succeeded by Shintaro Ito
