= Gaku Hashimoto =

Japanese politician

- 橋本 岳
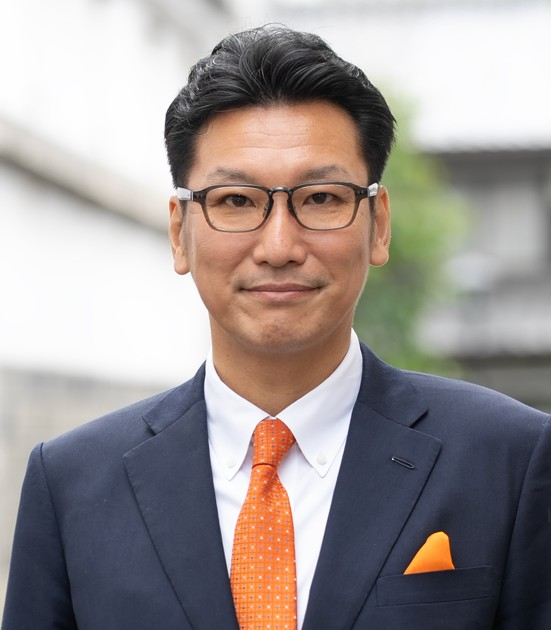
- Official portrait, 2026

Member of the House of Representatives
- Incumbent
- Assumed office 9 February 2026
- Preceded by: Michiyoshi Yunoki
- Constituency: Okayama 4th
- In office 16 December 2012 – 9 October 2024
- Preceded by: Michiyoshi Yunoki
- Succeeded by: Michiyoshi Yunoki
- Constituency: Okayama 4th
- In office 11 September 2005 – 21 July 2009
- Constituency: Chūgoku PR

Personal details
- Born: 5 February 1974 (age 52) Sōja, Okayama, Japan
- Party: Liberal Democratic
- Spouse: Hanako Jimi (m. 2021)
- Children: 4
- Parent: Ryutaro Hashimoto (father)
- Relatives: Daijiro Hashimoto (uncle); Ryogo Hashimoto (grandfather)
- Education: Keio University
- Website: 衆議院議員 橋本がく

Gaku Hashimoto (橋本 岳, Hashimoto Gaku; born 5 February 1974) is a Japanese politician of the Liberal Democratic Party and a member of the House of Representatives in the Diet. He represents the 4th District of Okayama prefecture.

== Background ==
A native of Sōja, Okayama, Gaku Hashimoto is the son of a former Prime Minister of Japan, Ryutaro Hashimoto, and the grandson of Ryugo Hashimoto, also a member of the House of Representatives.

His uncle Daijiro Hashimoto is a former governor of Kōchi Prefecture. His mother Kumiko Nakamura belongs to another dynasty, the Nakamura family.

His great-grandfather Utaro Hashimoto headed the quasi-monopolistic Dai-Nippon Beer Company, Ltd., which is now Sapporo Brewery.

== Career ==
Hashimoto attended the Keio University as both undergraduate and graduate, and joined the Mitsubishi Research Institute.

In 2005, Hashimoto was elected to the House of Representatives for the first time. He also served as Member, Special Committee on Okinawa and Northern Problems, Director, Special Committee on Anti-Piracy Measures, Prevention of International Terrorism, and Japan's Cooperation and Support, Director, Committee on Internal Affairs and Communications.

== Ideology ==
Hashimoto is affiliated to the openly revisionist lobby Nippon Kaigi, and a member of the following right-wing groups in the Diet:

- Nippon Kaigi Diet discussion group (日本会議国会議員懇談会 - Nippon kaigi kokkai giin kondankai)
- Conference of parliamentarians on the Shinto Association of Spiritual Leadership (神道政治連盟国会議員懇談会 - Shinto Seiji Renmei Kokkai Giin Kondankai) - NB: SAS a.k.a. Sinseiren, Shinto Political League
- 83 Group (83会)

Hashimoto gave the following answers to the questionnaire submitted by Mainichi to parliamentarians:

- In 2012:
  - in favor of the revision of the Constitution
  - in favor of the right of collective self-defense (revision of Article 9)
  - against the reform of the National assembly (unicameral instead of bicameral)
  - in favor of reactivating nuclear power plants
  - against the goal of zero nuclear power by 2030s
  - in favor of the relocation of Marine Corps Air Station Futenma (Okinawa)
  - against evaluating the purchase of Senkaku Islands by the Government
  - in favor of a strong attitude versus China
  - no answer regarding the participation of Japan to the Trans-Pacific Partnership
  - in favor of considering a nuclear-armed Japan in the future
  - against the reform of the Imperial Household that would allow women to retain their Imperial status even after marriage
- In 2014:
  - in favor of the revision of the Article 9 of the Japanese Constitution
  - in favor of the right of collective self-defense
  - in favor of nuclear plants
  - no problem for visits of a Prime Minister to the controversial Yasukuni Shrine
  - in favor of the revision of the Murayama Statement
  - against the revision of the Kono Statement
  - against laws preventing hate speech
  - considers that Marine Corps Air Station Futenma is a burden for Okinawa
  - in favor of the Special Secrecy Law
  - against teaching 'morality' in school
