= Takao Jinnouchi =

Japanese politician (1933–2026)

- 陣内 孝雄
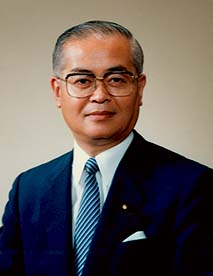
- Official portrait, 1999

Minister of Justice
- In office 8 March 1999 – 5 October 1999
- Prime Minister: Keizo Obuchi
- Preceded by: Shozaburo Nakamura
- Succeeded by: Hideo Usui

Member of the House of Councillors
- In office 10 April 1988 – 28 July 2007
- Preceded by: Makoto Miike
- Succeeded by: Minoru Kawasaki
- Constituency: Saga at-large

Personal details
- Born: 24 August 1933 Kanzaki, Saga, Japan
- Died: 8 September 2026 (aged 93)
- Party: Liberal Democratic
- Education: Kyoto University

Takao Jinnouchi (陣内 孝雄, Jinnouchi Takao; 24 August 1933 – 8 September 2026) was a Japanese bureaucrat and politician who was a member of the Liberal Democratic Party (LDP). He served as the Minister of Justice in 1999.

== Life and career ==
Jinnouchi was born in Kanzaki, Saga, Japan on 24 August 1933. He worked as a bureaucrat in the construction ministry. He was a member of the LDP and was first part of the faction headed by Keizo Obuchi. Jinnouchi then joined the faction led by Ryutaro Hashimoto in the party. He served in the Upper House for the LDP for three terms. He held the post of the parliamentary vice minister for agriculture, forestry, and fisheries.

He was appointed justice minister in the cabinet led by Prime Minister Keizo Obuchi. Jinnouchi succeeded Shozaburo Nakamura in the post who resigned from office over giving permission for Arnold Schwarzenegger to enter the country without a passport. Jinnouchi's tenure ended on 5 October 1999 when Hideo Usui replaced him as justice minister.

Jinnouchi died on 8 September 2026, at the age of 93.
