= Yūhei Yamashita =

- 山下 雄平
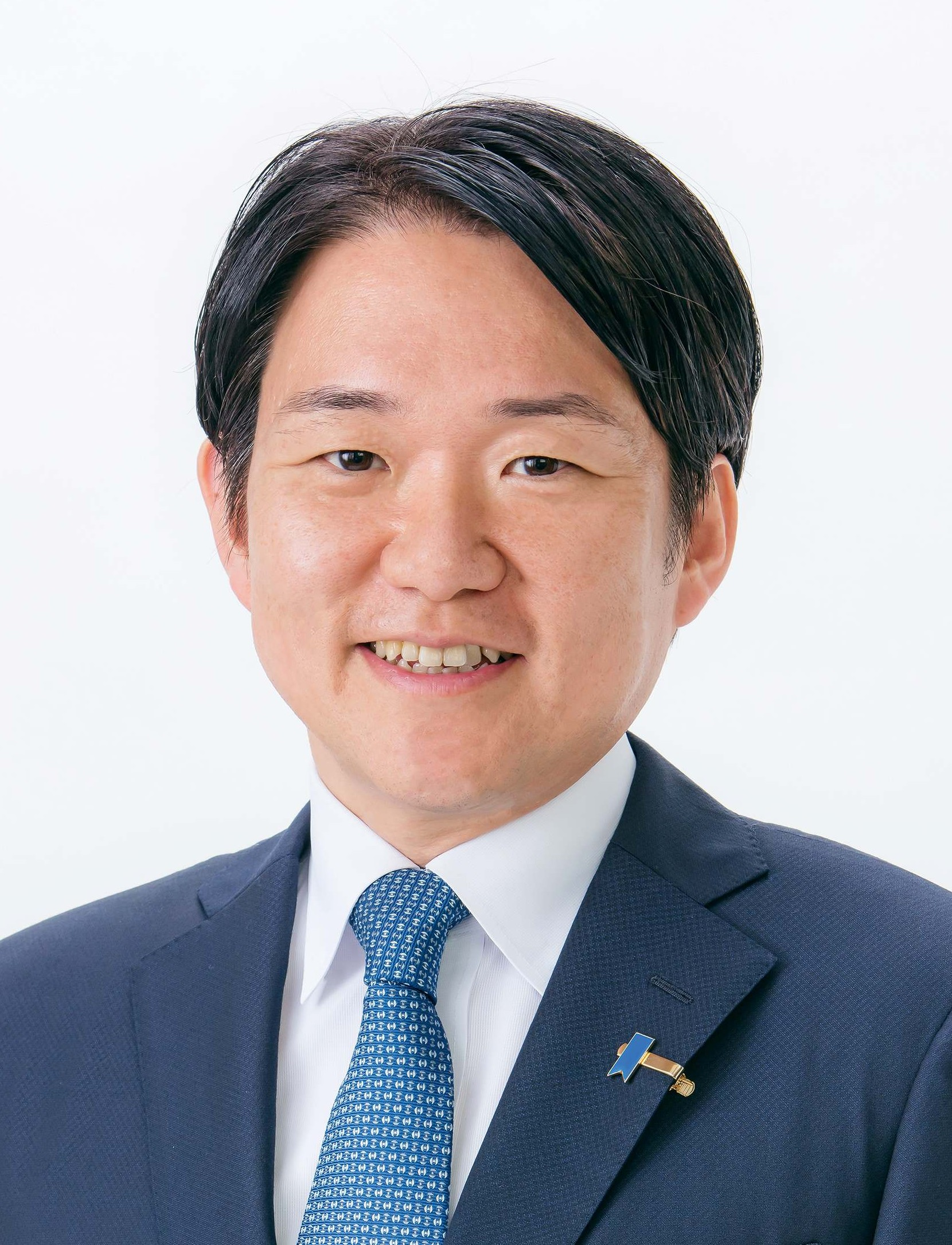
- Official portrait, 2024

Member of the House of Councillors
- Incumbent
- Assumed office 29 July 2013
- Preceded by: Minoru Kawasaki
- Constituency: Saga at-large

Personal details
- Born: 27 August 1979 (age 47) Karatsu, Saga, Japan
- Party: Liberal Democratic
- Education: Keio University

Yūhei Yamashita is a Japanese politician who is a member of the House of Councillors of Japan.

== Biography ==
He had served one term from 1995 to 2001. He also had served since 2007, and was reelected in 2013, and 2019.
