= Iwanuma =

Iwanuma 岩沼市
- City
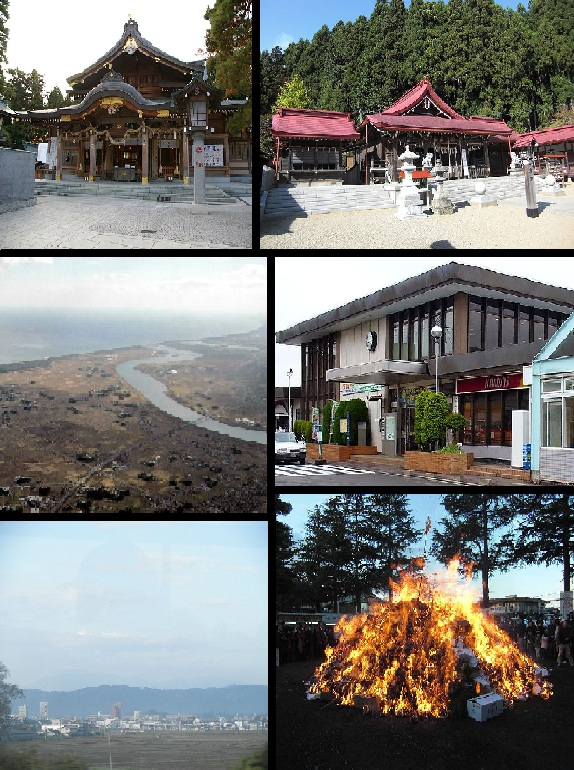
- Takekoma Shrine, Kanahebisui Shrine; Abukuma River, Iwanuma Station; Iwanuma urban area, Dontosai festival

- Flag Seal

- Location of Iwanuma in Miyagi Prefecture

- Coordinates: 38°06′15.4″N 140°52′12.6″E
- Country: Japan
- Region: Tōhoku
- Prefecture: Miyagi
- First official recorded: 842 AD
- City settled: November 1, 1971

Government
  - Mayor: Sō Kisawa (鬼沢聡) from June 2026

Area
  - Total: 60.45 km^{2} (23.34 sq mi)

Population (May 31, 2020)
  - Total: 43,946
  - Density: 727.0/km^{2} (1,883/sq mi)
- Time zone: UTC+9 (Japan Standard Time)
- Tree: Japanese Black Pine
- Flower: Azalea
- Bird: Seagull
- Phone number: 0223-22-1111
- Address: 1-6-20 Sakura, Iwanuma-shi, Miyagi-ken 989-2480
- Website: Official website

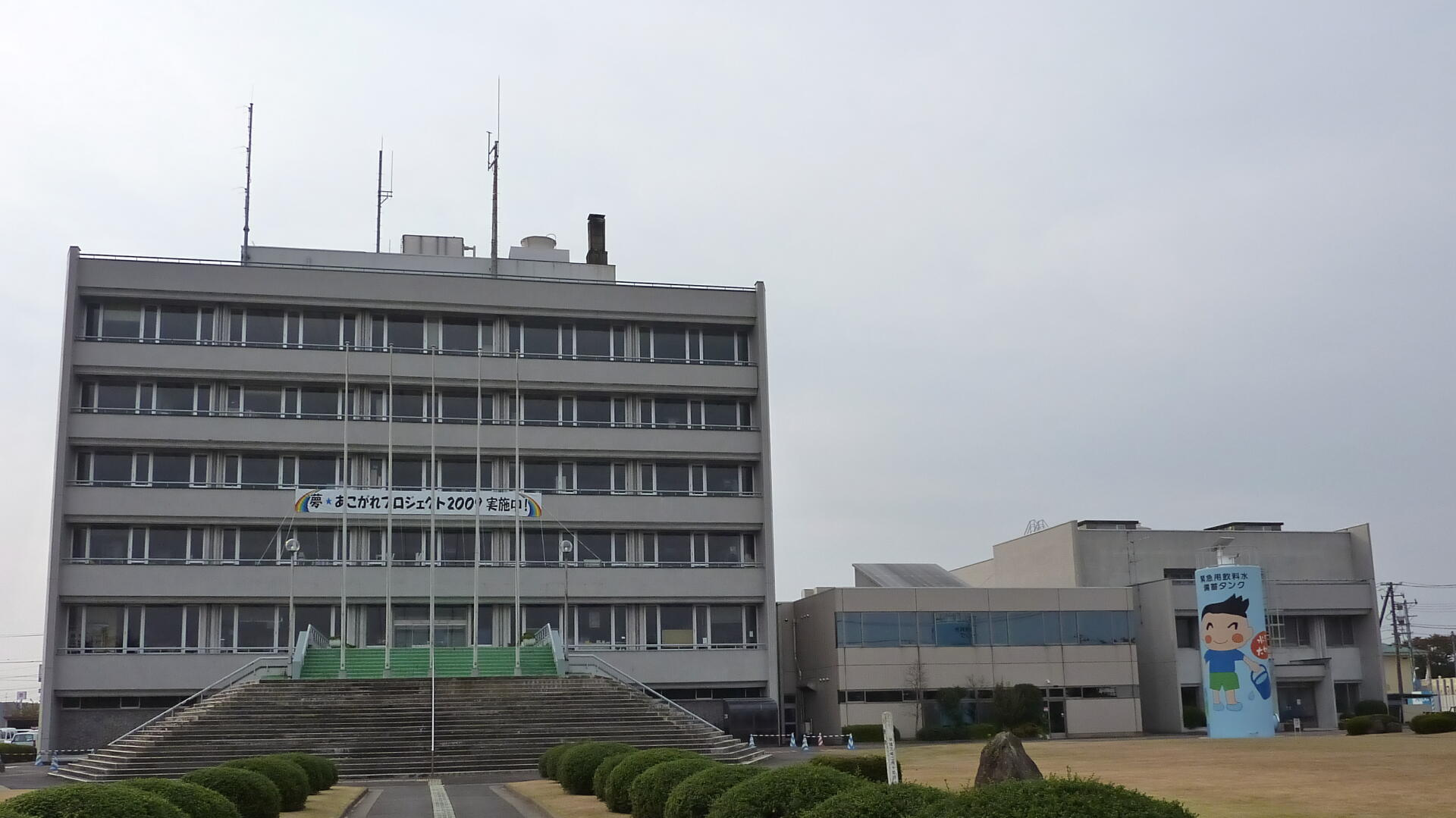
Iwanuma City Hall

Iwanuma (岩沼市, Iwanuma-shi; Japanese pronunciation: [ì.β̞ä́.nɨ́.mä́(.ɕì)]) is a city located in Miyagi Prefecture, Japan. As of 31 March 2020, the city had an estimated population of 43,946 in 18,062 households, and a population density of 730 persons per km². The total area of the city is 60.45 square kilometres (23.34 sq mi). Iwanuma is at the convergence of two ancient roads, the Tōkaidō and the Rikuzen-Hama Kaidō.

== Geography ==
Iwanuma is in the east-center Miyagi Prefecture, bordered by the Pacific Ocean to the east. It is also located at the mouth of the Abukuma River.

=== Neighboring municipalities ===
Miyagi Prefecture

- Murata
- Natori
- Shibata
- Watari

== Climate ==
Iwanuma has a humid subtropical climate (Köppen climate classification Cfa) characterized by mild summers and cold winters. The average annual temperature in Iwanuma is 12.6 °C. The average annual rainfall is 1252 mm with September as the wettest month. The temperatures are highest on average in August, at around 24.9 °C, and lowest in January, at around 1.6 °C.

== Demographics ==
Per Japanese census data, the population of Iwanuma has recently plateued after a long period of growth.

Historical population
Year	Pop.	±%
1920	15,428	—
1930	17,524	+13.6%
1940	18,490	+5.5%
1950	25,303	+36.8%
1960	26,452	+4.5%
1970	29,822	+12.7%
1980	34,910	+17.1%
1990	38,091	+9.1%
2000	41,407	+8.7%
2010	44,187	+6.7%
2020	44,068	−0.3%

== History ==
The area of present-day Iwanuma was part of ancient Mutsu Province, and the Takekoma Inari Shrine claims to have been founded in 842 AD. Mention of “Iwanuma Castle” appears in early Muromachi period documents. The area came under the control of the Date clan of Sendai Domain during the Edo period, under the Tokugawa shogunate. The town of Iwanuma was established on June 1, 1889 with the establishment of the modern municipalities system.

The village of Okuma merged with Iwanuma on January 11, 1947, followed by Sengan and Tamaura on April 1, 1955. Iwanuma was raised to city status on November 1, 1971.

The city was seriously affected by the tsunami associated with the 2011 Tōhoku earthquake, which resulted in 180 deaths.

== Government ==
Iwanuma has a mayor-council form of government with a directly elected mayor and a unicameral city legislature of 20 members. Iwanuma contributes one seat to the Miyagi Prefectural legislature. In terms of national politics, the city is part of Miyagi 3rd district of the lower house of the Diet of Japan.

== Education ==
Iwanuma has four public elementary school and four public middle schools operated by the city government, and one public high school operated by the Miyagi Prefectural Board of Education. The prefectural also operates a special education school for the handicapped.

== Transportation ==
=== Railway ===
East Japan Railway Company (JR East) - Tōhoku Main Line/Jōban Line

- Iwanuma

=== Highway ===
- Sendai-Tōbu Road – Iwanuma IC
- National Route 4
- National Route 6

== Media ==
- Iwanuma Community FM Station

== Local attractions ==
- Takekoma Inari Shrine, - claiming to be the second oldest Inari shrine

== Sister cities ==
- (United States) Dover, Delaware, USA friendship city since 2003
- Nankoku, Kōchi, Japan since July 23, 1973
- (United States) Napa, California, USA, since February 15, 1973 .
- Obanazawa, Yamagata, Japan since November 7, 1999

== Noted people from Iwanuma ==
- Akiko Okamoto, politician
- Kiyoko Ono, former politician and artistic gymnast
- Ryusuke Taguchi, professional wrestlerʋ
