= Kokichi Shimoinaba =

Japanese politician (1926–2014)

- 下稲葉 耕吉
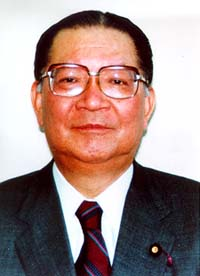
- Official portrait, 1997

Minister of Justice
- In office 11 September 1997 – 30 July 1998
- Prime Minister: Ryutaro Hashimoto
- Preceded by: Isao Matsuura
- Succeeded by: Shozaburo Nakamura

Member of the House of Councillors
- In office 15 July 1986 – 25 July 1998
- Constituency: National PR

Personal details
- Born: 29 April 1926 Kagoshima Prefecture, Japan
- Died: 17 February 2014 (aged 87) Nakano, Tokyo, Japan
- Party: Liberal Democratic
- Education: University of Tokyo

Kokichi Shimoinaba (April 29, 1926 – February 17, 2014) was a Japanese politician and police chief. He served as the Minister of Justice from 1997 to 1998.

Shimoinaba joined the former Home Ministry in 1947, just before the ministry was abolished. He then served as the Prefectural Police chief of Tokushima, Osaka and the Tokyo Metropolitan Police Department.

Shimoinaba was elected to the House of Councillors in 1986. Japanese Prime Minister Ryutaro Hashimoto appointed him as Minister of Justice in 1997.

Kokichi Shimoinaba died from sepsis on February 17, 2014, at the age of 87.
