= Michiyoshi Yunoki =

Japanese politician

- 柚木 道義
- Official portrait, 2012

Member of the House of Representatives
- In office 11 September 2005 – 23 January 2026
- Preceded by: Ryutaro Hashimoto
- Succeeded by: Gaku Hashimoto
- Constituency: Okayama 4th (2005–2012); Chūgoku PR (2012–2024); Okayama 4th (2024–2026)

Personal details
- Born: 28 May 1972 (age 54) Kurashiki, Okayama, Japan
- Party: CRA (since 2026)
- Other political affiliations: DPJ (before 2016); DP (2016–2017); KnT (2017–2018); DPP (2018); Independent (2018–2020); CDP (2020–2026)
- Education: Okayama University
- Website: 柚木みちよし

Michiyoshi Yunoki (柚木 道義, Yunoki Michiyoshi; born 28 May 1972) is a Japanese politician and a member of the House of Representatives for the Constitutional Democratic Party of Japan. A native of Kurashiki, Okayama and graduate of Okayama University, he worked at the publisher Yurindo from 1997 to 2002. He was elected to the House of Representatives for the first time in 2005 for the DPJ after an unsuccessful run in 2003.
