= Kazuchika Iwata =

Japanese politician

- 岩田 和親
- Official portrait, 2024

Member of the House of Representatives from Kyushu
- Incumbent
- Assumed office 19 December 2012
- Preceded by: Kazuhiro Haraguchi
- Constituency: Saga 1st (2012–2014); Kyushu PR (2014–2026); Saga 1st (2026–present)

Member of the Saga Prefectural Assembly
- In office 1999–2011
- Constituency: Saga City

Personal details
- Born: 20 September 1973 (age 53) Saga, Japan
- Party: Liberal Democratic
- Education: Kyushu University

Kazuchika Iwata (born 20 September 1973) is a Japanese politician who has been serving as a member of the House of Representatives since 2012. He has also served as the State Minister of Economy, Trade and Industry and State Minister of Cabinet Office.

== Biography ==
He graduated from the Faculty of Law at Kyushu University and was first elected in 2012.
