= Takamaro Fukuoka =

Japanese politician (born 1973)

- 福岡 資麿
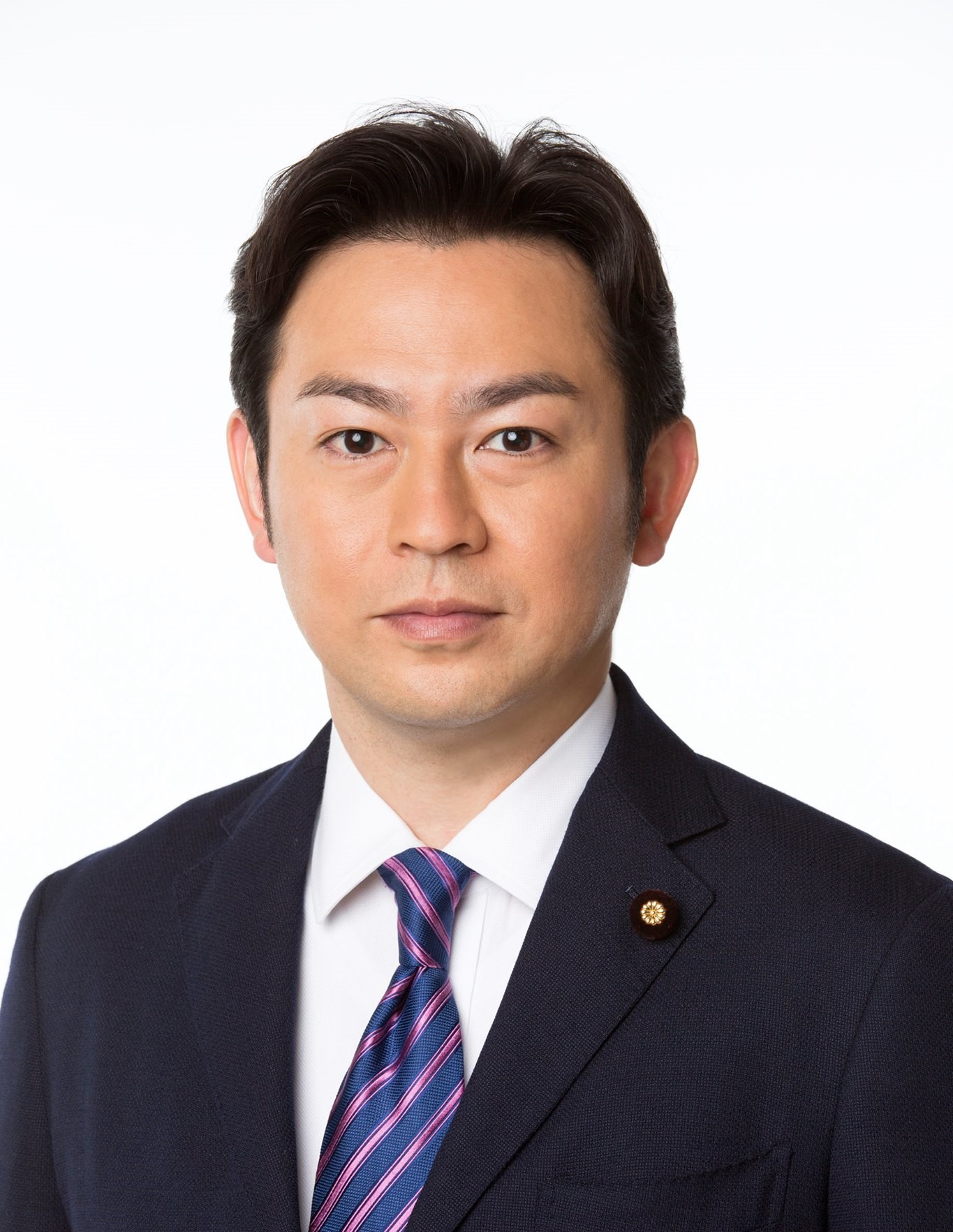
- Official portrait, 2015

Minister of Health, Labour, and Welfare
- In office 1 October 2024 – 21 October 2025
- Prime Minister: Shigeru Ishiba
- Preceded by: Keizō Takemi
- Succeeded by: Kenichiro Ueno

Member of the House of Councillors
- Incumbent
- Assumed office 26 July 2010
- Preceded by: Hiromi Iwanaga
- Constituency: Saga at-large

Member of the House of Representatives
- In office 11 September 2005 – 21 July 2009
- Preceded by: Kazuhiro Haraguchi
- Succeeded by: Kazuhiro Haraguchi
- Constituency: Saga 1st

Personal details
- Born: 9 May 1973 (age 53) Kawasoe, Saga, Japan
- Party: Liberal Democratic
- Education: Keio University

Takamaro Fukuoka (福岡 資麿, Fukuoka Takamaro; born 9 May 1973) is a Japanese politician from Saga City and member of the Liberal Democratic Party. Fukuoka was elected to the House of Representatives in Saga 1st district in after an unsuccessful run in 2003. He lost the seat in the 2009 election but was elected to the House of Councillors in 2010. In October 2024, Fukuoka became the Minister of Health, Labour and Welfare in the Ishiba Cabinet.

Fukuoka graduated from the Department of Political Science, Faculty of Law, Keio University in 1996 and joined the Mitsubishi Estate company.

Political offices
Preceded by Keizō Takemi	Minister of Health, Labour and Welfare; 2024–present	Incumbent
House of Representatives (Japan)
Preceded by Kazuhiro Haraguchi	Representative for Saga's 1st district 2005–2009	Succeeded by Kazuhiro Haraguchi
