= Kazuhiro Haraguchi =

Japanese politician (born 1959)

- 原口 一博
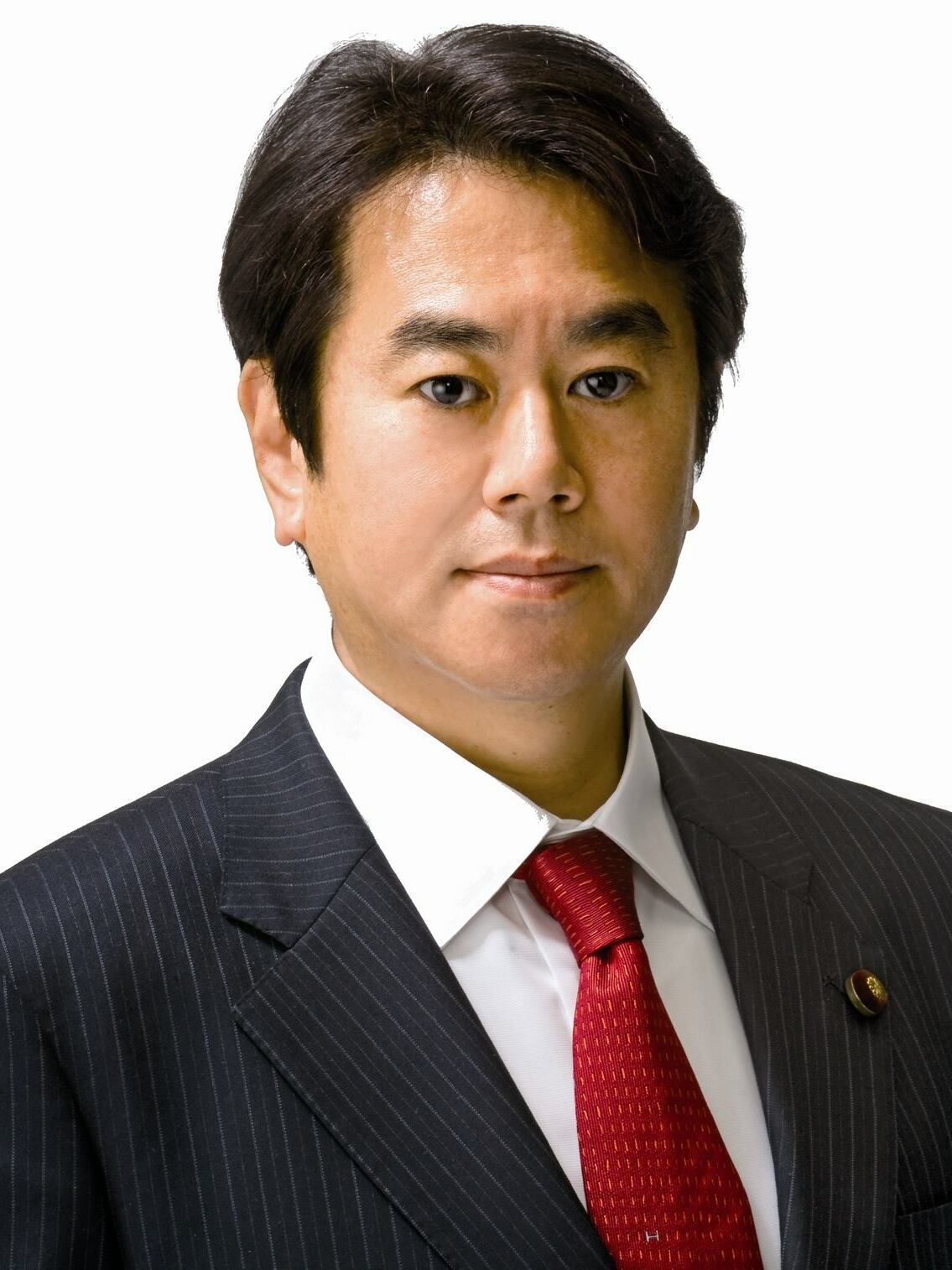
- Official portrait, 2009

Co-leader of Tax Cuts Japan and Yukoku Alliance
- Incumbent
- Assumed office 24 January 2026 Serving with Takashi Kawamura
- Preceded by: Office established

Minister for Internal Affairs and Communications
- In office 16 September 2009 – 17 September 2010
- Prime Minister: Yukio Hatoyama; Naoto Kan
- Preceded by: Tsutomu Sato
- Succeeded by: Yoshihiro Katayama

Member of the House of Representatives; from Kyushu
- In office 21 October 1996 – 23 January 2026
- Preceded by: Constituency established
- Succeeded by: Kazuchika Iwata
- Constituency: See list: Saga 1st (1996–2000) PR block (2000–2003); Saga 1st (2003–2005) PR block (2005–2009); Saga 1st (2009–2012) PR block (2012–2014); Saga 1st (2014–2026)

Member of the Saga Prefectural Assembly
- In office April 1987 – 6 July 1993
- Constituency: Saga City

Personal details
- Born: 2 July 1959 (age 67) Saga, Japan
- Party: Genzei–Yukoku (since 2026)
- Other political affiliations: LDP (until 1993); Independent (1993–1996); NFP (1996–1998); DPJ (1998–2016); DP (2016–2018); DPP (2018–2020); CDP (2020–2026)
- Education: University of Tokyo

Kazuhiro Haraguchi (Japanese: 原口 一博, Hepburn: Haraguchi Kazuhiro; born 2 July 1959) is a Japanese politician of the Tax Cuts Japan and Yukoku Alliance, and a former member of the House of Representatives in the Diet (national legislature).

== Political career ==
A native of Saga and a graduate of the University of Tokyo, he was elected to the assembly of Saga Prefecture (District #1) for the first time in 1987 as a member of the Liberal Democratic Party, serving there for two times. In 1996 he was elected to the House of Representatives from Saga's 1st district for the first time as a member of the New Frontier Party (Shinshinto) after running unsuccessfully in 1993 as an independent. He switched to the DPJ in 1998. He was Minister of Internal Affairs from 2009 to 2010, in Yukio Hatoyama and Naoto Kan's Cabinets.

Haraguchi studied Psychology at the University of Tokyo and attended the Matsushita Institute of Government and Management. He often appears on television in which he discusses tax, pension, and decentralization issues.

In the 2012 general election, Haraguchi lost his single-seat electorate but retained a seat in the diet through the proportional representation system. He regained his seat in the 2014 election.

Following Constitutional Democratic Party (CDP) leader Yoshihiko Noda's announcement that the CDP and Komeito would merge to form the Centrist Reform Alliance, Haraguchi criticized Noda on X, announcing that he would not join the new party, but instead would turn his existing organization, the Yukoku Alliance, into a political party in the House of Representatives. Haraguchi lost his seat in the 2026 general election.

== Positions ==
Haraguchi gave the following answers to the questionnaire submitted by the Mainichi Shimbun to parliamentarians in 2012:

- in favor of the revision of the Constitution
- in favor of right of collective self-defense (revision of Article 9)
- in favor of reform of the National assembly (unicameral instead of bicameral)
- in favor of zero nuclear power by 2030s
- in favor of the relocation of Marine Corps Air Station Futenma (Okinawa)
- in favor of the reform of the Imperial Household that would allow women to retain their Imperial status even after marriage
- against participation of Japan to the Trans-Pacific Partnership
- against a nuclear-armed Japan

Haraguchi is a member of the association of parliamentarians promoting visits to Yasukuni Shrine.

=== Controversial remarks about Russia's invasion of Ukraine ===
Haraguchi mentioned support for Ukraine in a YouTube video and said, "Japan is behind the neo-Nazi regime." The Ukrainian Embassy in Japan protested Haraguchi's remarks on X. Haraguchi explained, "The intention was that Russia was telling us that we were behind the neo-Nazi regime," and the Constitutional Democratic Party to which Haraguchi belongs warned him verbally.

=== Vaccine remarks lawsuit ===
In December 2024, the pharmaceutical company Meiji Seika Pharma filed a lawsuit against Haraguchi after he described the company's new coronavirus vaccine as being like a "biological weapon" in a post on X.

House of Representatives (Japan)
| Preceded by New district Takanori Sakai; Takamaro Fukuoka | Representative for Saga's 1st district 1996–2000; 2003–2005; 2009–present | Succeeded by Takanori Sakai; Takamaro Fukuoka; Incumbent |
| Preceded by N/A | Representative for the Kyūshū proportional representation block 2000–2003; 2005–2009 | Succeeded by N/A |
Political offices
| Preceded by Tsutomu Sato | Minister for Internal Affairs and Communications; 2009–2010 | Succeeded by Yoshihiro Katayama |
| New office | Minister of State for Promotion of Local Sovereignty; 2009–2010 | Succeeded by Yoshihiro Katayama |
