= Shozaburo Nakamura =

Japanese business leader and politician (1934–2023)

- 中村 正三郎
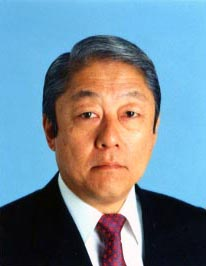
- Official portrait, 1998

Minister of Justice
- In office 30 July 1998 – 8 March 1999
- Prime Minister: Keizō Obuchi
- Preceded by: Kokichi Shimoinaba
- Succeeded by: Takao Jinnouchi

Director-General of the Environmental Agency
- In office 5 November 1991 – 12 December 1992
- Prime Minister: Kiichi Miyazawa
- Preceded by: Kazuo Aichi
- Succeeded by: Taikan Hayashi

Member of the House of Representatives; from Southern Kanto
- In office 7 October 1979 – 8 August 2005
- Preceded by: Chūji Yoshiura
- Succeeded by: Multi-member district
- Constituency: Chiba 3rd (1979–1996); PR block (1996–2000); Chiba 12th (2000–2003); PR block (2003–2005)

Personal details
- Born: 18 July 1934 Miyoshi, Chiba, Japan
- Died: 1 September 2023 (aged 89)
- Party: Liberal Democratic
- Parent: Yōichirō Nakamura (father)
- Education: Keio University

Shozaburo Nakamura (中村 正三郎, Nakamura Shōzaburō; 18 July 1934 – 1 September 2023) was a Japanese business leader and politician. He served in the House of Representatives of Japan and was the Minister of Justice from 1998 to 1999.

== Early life and career ==
Shozaburo Nakamura was born in 1934. He was a business leader. He served in the lower house of the Japanese Diet. He also held the positions of state minister for the environment agency and parliamentary vice-minister for finance.

Nakamura was appointed Justice Minister in the cabinet led by Prime Minister Keizo Obuchi on 30 July 1998. Nakamura replaced Kokichi Shimoinaba as Justice Minister. Nakamura's term ended on 8 March 1999 when he resigned from office over the controversy sparked when Arnold Schwarzenegger was allowed to enter Japan without a passport in October 1998. Takao Jinnouchi became Justice Minister on 8 March 1999, replacing Nakamura in the post.

== Personal life and death ==
Nakamura was among the richest members of the lower house and was ranked fourth with assets worth about 1.5 billion yen in 2000.

Shozaburo Nakamura died on 1 September 2023, at the age of 89.
