= Wataru Kubo =

Japanese politician (1929–2003)

- 久保 亘
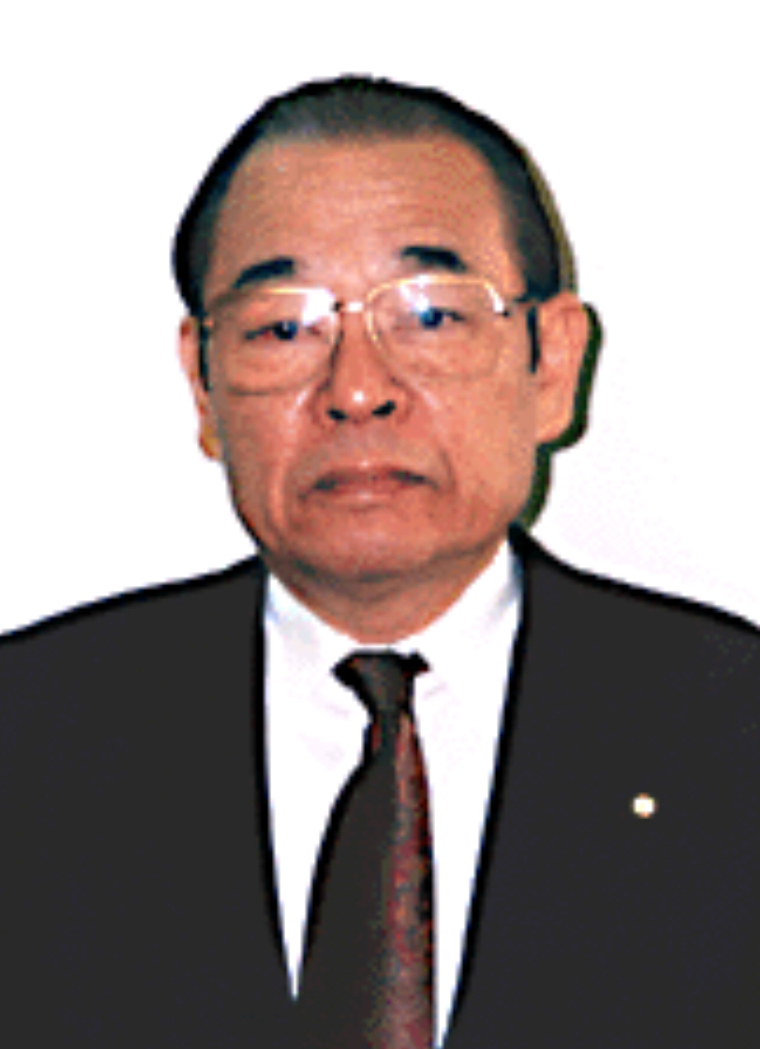
- Official portrait, 1996

Deputy Prime Minister of Japan
- In office 11 January 1996 – 7 November 1996
- Prime Minister: Ryutaro Hashimoto
- Preceded by: Ryutaro Hashimoto
- Succeeded by: Naoto Kan (2009)

Minister of Finance
- In office 11 January 1996 – 7 November 1996
- Prime Minister: Ryutaro Hashimoto
- Preceded by: Masayoshi Takemura
- Succeeded by: Hiroshi Mitsuzuka

Member of the House of Councillors
- In office 10 July 1983 – 22 July 2001
- Preceded by: Takeo Tahara
- Succeeded by: Seat abolished
- Constituency: Kagoshima at-large
- In office 8 July 1974 – 7 July 1980
- Preceded by: Tameji Kawakami
- Succeeded by: Shinjirō Kawahara
- Constituency: Kagoshima at-large

Member of the Kagoshima Prefectural Assembly
- In office 1963–1974
- Constituency: Kagoshima City

Personal details
- Born: 15 January 1929 Aira, Kagoshima, Japan
- Died: 24 June 2003 (aged 74) Kagoshima City, Kagoshima, Japan
- Party: Democratic (1998–2003)
- Other political affiliations: JSP (1963–1996); SDP (1996–1997); DRP (1997–1998)
- Education: Hiroshima University of Literature and Science

Wataru Kubo (久保 亘, Kubo Wataru; 15 January 1929 – 24 June 2003) was a Japanese politician from the Japan Socialist Party, and then from the Democratic Party of Japan. He served as deputy prime minister and finance minister of Japan from 11 January 1996 to 7 November 1996.

== Early life and education ==
Kubo was born in Kagoshima Prefecture on 15 January 1929. He finished Kagoshima Normal School (currently Kagoshima University) and entered Department of Western History, Hiroshima University of Literature and Science (currently Hiroshima University). He received a bachelor's degree from Hiroshima University of Literature and Science in 1952.

== Career ==
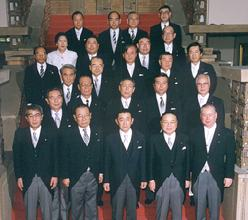
Kubo with members of the First Hashimoto Cabinet (at the Prime Minister's Official Residence on January 11, 1996)

Kubo started his career as a high-school teacher. Then he was involved in politics, and in 1963, he was elected to the Kagoshima Prefectural Assembly where he served for three terms. He was first elected to the upper house in July 1974 from Kagoshima at-large district. Until 1993 he served as chairman and a member of different committees at the house, including the budget and finance committee in the upper house. In September 1993, he was named as secretary general of the Social Democratic Party during the term of the party chief Tomiichi Murayama. He was also chief finance policy strategist and deputy chairman of the party.

He served as deputy prime minister and finance minister from 11 January to 7 November 1996 in the first cabinet of Prime Minister Ryutaro Hashimoto that was a coalition of the Liberal Democratic Party, the SDP and New Party Sakigake. Kubo's term ended when Hashimoto inaugurated his second cabinet and the coalition parties SPD and New Party Sakigake remained outside the government. Kubo was succeeded by Hiroshi Mitsuzuka as finance minister.

Kubo left the SPD on 6 January 1997 due to the disagreements with the SPD chief Takako Doi. After his resignation, Kubo joined the Democratic Party of Japan (DPJ). Then he became a member of the upper house with the DPJ. He retired from politics as a member of the DPJ in June 2001 after serving four terms at the upper house, being a representative of Kagoshima Prefecture.

== Personal life ==
Kubo had a high rank in kendo. He received the Grand Cordon of the Order of the Rising Sun, Japan's top award for contributions to the state and society, in November 2001.

== Death ==
Kubo died at a hospital in Kagoshima on 24 June 2003. He was 74.
