= Saga 1st district =

Legislative district of Japan

Saga 1st District
- Parliamentary constituency for the Japanese House of Representatives
- Numbered map of Saga Prefecture single-member districts
- Prefecture: Saga
- Proportional District: Kyushu

Current constituency
- Created: 1994
- Seats: One
- Party: LDP
- Representative: Kazuchika Iwata

Saga 1st district (佐賀県第1区, Saga-ken dai-ikku) is a single-member constituency of the House of Representatives in the national Diet of Japan located in Saga Prefecture.

Kazuhiro Haraguchi initially won the district narrowly for the New Frontier Party (NFP) in 1996 but lost it in 2000 to Takanori Sakai (LDP) who was appointed as Cabinet Office Vice Minister in the 2nd realigned Mori cabinet. In March 2003, Sakai was arrested (and later sentenced to 32 months in prison) for having received illicit corporate donations in violation of the Political Funds Control Law.
Takamaro Fukuoka replaced Sakai as LDP candidate for Saga 1 in the 2003 election and lost to Haraguchi. The "postal privatization" election of 2005 gave the LDP a landslide victory, and Fukuoka beat Haraguchi despite the fact that the DPJ's opposition ally, the Social Democratic Party (SDP), unlike in previous elections did not nominate a candidate in Saga 1st district. In the landslide LDP defeat of 2009, Haraguchi won the district for the third time and became the Minister for Internal Affairs and Communications in the Hatoyama Cabinet.
Haraguchi was defeated by Kazuchika Iwata (LDP), a former second-generation Saga prefectural assemblyman, in 2012 but regained the seat in 2014.

In September 2023 the district had 331,037 eligible voters. In 2012 they were 237,748.

Before the 1994 electoral reform, the area had been part of Saga At-large district where five representatives were elected by single non-transferable vote.

== Area ==
- Saga City
- Tosu
- Kanzaki
- Yoshinogari (town in Kanzaki District)
- Towns of Miyaki District

== List of representatives ==
Election	Representative	Party	Notes
1996	Kazuhiro Haraguchi	NFP	After the dissolution of NFP, Haraguchi joined DPJ through Voice of the people, GGP.
2000	Takanori Sakai	LDP	
2003	Kazuhiro Haraguchi	DPJ	
2005	Takamaro Fukuoka	LDP	Elected to the House of Councillors in 2010
2009	Kazuhiro Haraguchi	DPJ	
2012	Kazuchika Iwata	LDP	
2014	Kazuhiro Haraguchi	DPJ	
2017	Kazuhiro Haraguchi	Ind.	Haraguchi tried to run for office in Kibō no Tō, but gave up.
2021	Kazuhiro Haraguchi	CDP	
2024	Kazuhiro Haraguchi	CDP	
2026	Kazuchika Iwata	LDP	

== Election results ==
2026
Party	Candidate	Votes	%	±%
LDP	Kazuchika Iwata	84,220	45.7	▲0.4
Genzei–Yukoku	Kazuhiro Haraguchi	83,028	45.0	▼9.7
Sanseitō	Takami Shigematsu	17,229	9.3	
Registered electors		328,646		
Turnout			57.74	
LDP gain from Genzei–Yukoku				

2024
Party	Candidate	Votes	%	±%
CDP	Kazuhiro Haraguchi	96,083	54.7	
LDP	Kazuchika Iwata (Won PR seat)	79,723	45.3	
Registered electors		330,285		
Turnout			54.48	
CDP hold				

2021
Party	Candidate	Votes	%	±%
CDP	Kazuhiro Haraguchi	92,452	50.04	
LDP (Komeito)	Kazuchika Iwata (Won PR seat)	92,319	49.96	

2017
Party	Candidate	Votes	%	±%
Independent (Democratic)	Kazuhiro Haraguchi	105,487	55.65	
LDP (Komeito)	Kazuchika Iwata (Won PR seat)	78,972	41.66	
Happiness Realization	Toru Nakajima	5086	2.68	

2014
Party	Candidate	Votes	%	±%
Democratic	Kazuhiro Haraguchi	85,903	47.5	
LDP	Kazuchika Iwata (Won PR seat)	83,421	46.1	
JCP	Makoto Koga	11,483	6.4	
Registered electors		327,125		
Turnout			56.43	
Democratic gain from LDP				

2012
Party	Candidate	Votes	%	±%
LDP (Komeito)	Kazuchika Iwata	70,547	49.2	
Democratic (People's New)	Kazuhiro Haraguchi (Won PR seat)	63,007	43.9	
JCP	Hitoshi Ōmori	9,857	6.9	

2009
Party	Candidate	Votes	%	±%
DPJ (SDP, PNP support)	Kazuhiro Haraguchi	96,618		
LDP (Kōmeitō)	Takamaro Fukuoka	75,475		
Happiness Realization	Ken Koba	1,568		
Turnout		175,824	74.77	

2005
Party	Candidate	Votes	%	±%
LDP	Takamaro Fukuoka	84,643		
Democratic	Kazuhiro Haraguchi (Won PR seat)	75,449		
JCP	Akemi Mutō	8,029		
Turnout		170,282	73.28	

2003
Party	Candidate	Votes	%	±%
Democratic	Kazuhiro Haraguchi	70,271		
LDP	Takamaro Fukuoka	66,446		
Social Democratic	Hisahiro Shibata	8,315		
JCP	Yasutoshi Kamimura	4,977		
Turnout		152,297	66.13	

2000
Party	Candidate	Votes	%	±%
LDP	Takanori Sakai	70,155		
Democratic	Kazuhiro Haraguchi (Won PR seat)	62,932		
Social Democratic	Katsuyō Ogata	30,018		
JCP	Yasutoshi Kamimura	7,173		
Liberal League	Kō Nagai	1,612		

1996
Party	Candidate	Votes	%	±%
New Frontier	Kazuhiro Haraguchi	62,515		
LDP	Takanori Sakai (Won PR seat)	60,286		
Social Democratic	Katsuyō Ogata	27,514		
JCP	Yasutoshi Kamimura	7,670		
Liberal League	Takashi Kimura	2,493		
