= Okayama 4th district =

Japanese parliamentary constituency

Okayama 4th District
- Parliamentary constituency for the Japanese House of Representatives
- Numbered map of Okayama Prefecture single-member districts
- Prefecture: Okayama
- Proportional District: Chūgoku
- Electorate: 405,558 (2022)

Current constituency
- Created: 1994
- Party: LDP
- Representative: Gaku Hashimoto

Okayama 4th district is a single-member electoral district for the House of Representatives, the lower house of the national Diet of Japan. It is located in central coastal Okayama and covers the city of Kurashiki and the town of Hayashima. As of September 2012, 367,702 eligible voters were registered in the district, giving it slightly below average vote weight.

The first representative for Okayama 4th district was Liberal Democrat Ryūtarō Hashimoto who had represented the five-member 2nd district before the electoral reform, as had his father Ryōgo before him. Hashimoto, hit by a scandal over political donations from the Japanese Dentists' Federation in 2004, retired from politics in the 2005 general election. His son Gaku tried to "inherit" the seat, but lost to Democrat Michiyoshi Yunoki by a margin of about 6,000 votes. Hashimoto won a seat in the Chūgoku proportional representation block. In his second attempt in the 2009 general election, he lost to Yunoki by an even wider margin (sekihairitsu 72.4) and also failed to win a proportional seat. In his third attempt in the landslide election of 2012, Hashimoto won the district.

== List of representatives ==
Representative	Party	Dates	Notes
Ryūtarō Hashimoto	LDP	1996 – 2005	Prime Minister of Japan (1996 – 1998); Retired in 2005
Michiyoshi Yunoki	Democratic	2005 – 2012	Re-elected to a proportional seat in the Chūgoku block
Gaku Hashimoto	LDP	2012 – 2024	
Michiyoshi Yunoki	CDP	2024 – 2026	
Gaku Hashimoto	LDP	2026 –	

== Recent election results ==
2026
Party	Candidate	Votes	%	±%
LDP	Gaku Hashimoto (Endorsed by Ishin)	104,826	50.91	▲8.36
Centrist Reform	Michiyoshi Yunoki	65,960	32.03	▼18.28
DPP	Sayumi Miyake	28,765	13.97	
JCP	Yūichi Kakiuchi	6,372	3.09	▼4.05
Registered electors		399,672		
Turnout		205,923	52.46	▲6.07
LDP gain from Centrist Reform				

2024
Party	Candidate	Votes	%	±%
CDP	Michiyoshi Yunoki	89,149	50.3	▲3.5
LDP	Gaku Hashimoto	75,400	42.6	▼7.1
JCP	Yūichi Kakiuchi	12,648	7.1	
Registered electors		401,198		
Turnout			46.39	▼1.65
CDP gain from LDP				

2021
Party	Candidate	Votes	%	±%
LDP	Gaku Hashimoto	89,052	49.7	▼2.3
CDP	Michiyoshi Yunoki (won PR seat)	83,859	46.8	▲5.0
Independent	Tomoharu Nakagawa	6,146	3.4	
Turnout			48.04	▼0.07
LDP hold				

2017
Party	Candidate	Votes	%	±%
LDP	Gaku Hashimoto	93,172	51.95	▲0.33
Kibō no Tō	Michiyoshi Yunoki (won PR seat)	72,280	40.30	▼1.52
JCP	Akinari Hirabayashi	13,907	7.75	▲0.18
Turnout			48.11	▲1.80
LDP hold		Swing	▲0.9	

2014
Party	Candidate	Votes	%	±%
LDP	Gaku Hashimoto	91,189	50.62	▲4.20
Democratic	Michiyoshi Yunoki (won PR seat)	75,338	41.82	▲9.80
JCP	Yūichi Kakiuchi	13,629	7.57	▲1.90
LDP hold		Swing	▼2.8	

2012
Party	Candidate	Votes	%	±%
LDP (Komeito)	Gaku Hashimoto	91,155	46.4	
Democratic (People's New)	Michiyoshi Yunoki (won PR seat)	64,293	32.7	
Restoration	Masaharu Akazawa	29,798	15.2	
JCP	Nobuko Sumasu	11,125	5.7	

2009
Party	Candidate	Votes	%	±%
Democratic (People's New)	Michiyoshi Yunoki	134,319	57.0	
LDP (Komeito)	Gaku Hashimoto	97,284	41.3	
Happiness Realization	Miyuka Koiwai	3,929	1.7	
Turnout		240,713	66.1	

2005
Party	Candidate	Votes	%	±%
Democratic	Michiyoshi Yunoki	102,370	47.4	
LDP	Gaku Hashimoto (elected by PR)	96,356	44.6	
JCP	Tsuyoshi Azuma	17,094	7.9	
Turnout		223,514	62.4	

2003
Party	Candidate	Votes	%	±%
LDP	Ryūtarō Hashimoto	104,653	56.5	
Democratic	Michiyoshi Yunoki	66,199	35.7	
JCP	Tsuyoshi Azuma	14,367	7.8	
Turnout		192,293	54.3	
