= Hiroshi Mitsuzuka =

Japanese politician (1927–2004)

- 三塚 博
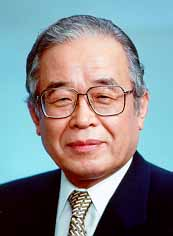
- Official portrait, 1996

Minister of Finance
- In office 7 November 1996 – 28 January 1998
- Prime Minister: Ryutaro Hashimoto
- Preceded by: Wataru Kubo
- Succeeded by: Hikaru Matsunaga

Secretary-General of the Liberal Democratic Party
- In office August 1995 – October 1995
- President: Yōhei Kōno
- Vice President: Keizō Obuchi
- Preceded by: Yoshirō Mori
- Succeeded by: Koichi Kato

Minister of Foreign Affairs
- In office 3 June 1989 – 10 August 1989
- Prime Minister: Sosuke Uno
- Preceded by: Sosuke Uno
- Succeeded by: Taro Nakayama

Minister of International Trade and Industry
- In office 28 December 1988 – 3 June 1989
- Prime Minister: Noboru Takeshita
- Preceded by: Hajime Tamura
- Succeeded by: Seiroku Kajiyama

Minister of Transport
- In office 28 December 1985 – 22 July 1986
- Prime Minister: Noboru Takeshita
- Preceded by: Tokuo Yamashita
- Succeeded by: Ryutaro Hashimoto

Member of the House of Representatives
- In office 11 December 1972 – 10 October 2003
- Preceded by: Hiroo Furuuchi
- Succeeded by: Akihiro Nishimura
- Constituency: Miyagi 1st (1972–1996); Miyagi 3rd (1996–2003)

Member of the Miyagi Prefectural Assembly
- In office 1963–1970

Personal details
- Born: 1 August 1927 Misato, Miyagi, Japan
- Died: 25 April 2004 (aged 76) Chūō, Tokyo, Japan
- Party: Liberal Democratic
- Education: Waseda University

Hiroshi Mitsuzuka (三塚博, Mitsuzuka Hiroshi; 1 August 1927 – 25 April 2004) was a veteran Japanese politician. He was a member of the Liberal Democratic Party of Japan. He represented his party at the House of Representatives from 1972 to 2003. In addition, he served as transport minister, international trade minister, finance minister and foreign affairs minister.

== Early life and education ==
Mitsuzuka was born in the town of Misato, Miyagi prefecture, on 1 August 1927. He first received a degree in veterinary medicine. Then he obtained a law degree from Waseda University.

== Political career ==
=== LDP career ===
Mitsuzuka was a leading member of the Liberal Democratic Party (LDP), being a member of the Seirankai. He was also Kokkai secretary. He served ten terms at the House of Representatives. He was first elected to the House in December 1972 from Miyagi Prefecture's No. 3 constituency. He held significant posts in the LDP, including policy research council chairman and secretary general.

Mitsuzuka was a member of the Abe faction, headed by Shintaro Abe. The first head of this faction that occupies the right wing of the LDP was Nobusuke Kishi, who was succeeded by Takeo Fukuda. Abe was the third head of the faction. Mitsuzuka was one of the "big four" in the faction consisted of he, Masajuro Shiokawa, Mutsuki Kato and Yoshirō Mori. On 20 June 1991, Mitsuzuka became leader of the Abe faction in the LDP, inheriting it after Abe's death in 1991. On the other hand, he and Mutsuki Kato toughly struggled over the control of the faction, resulting in Matsuki's removal from the faction in 1991. His election as faction leader led to the collapse of the solid coalition between the Takeshita faction, led by Noboru Takeshita, and Abe faction in the party. The Abe faction was later renamed as the Mitsuzuka faction under his leadership. His faction became one of the five influential factions in the LDP at the beginning of the 1990s. In December 1992, the faction was the largest group in the LDP with 73 members. In 1996, the faction of Mitsuzuka was still the largest one in the party with seventy-four members. The control of his faction was assumed by Yoshirō Mori by 1999.

In 1991, Mitsuzuka ran for the LDP president, but lost the election, and Kiichi Miyazawa became the president of the party. In 1994, Mitsuzuka ran for the prime ministership. However, due to the allegations of involvement in the construction scandals of 1994 his bid was not successful. Although he was not charged, criticisms about him became public. Mitsuzuka was appointed secretary general of the party by the LDP President Kono Yohei in 1996.

=== Ministerial career ===
Mitsuzuka's first ministerial post was the minister of transport in the cabinet led by Prime Minister Noboru Takeshita. He was in office from 1985 to 1986. Then he was appointed minister of international trade and industry in the same cabinet in a reshuffle on 28 December 1988, replacing Hajime Tamura in the post. His term continued until 1989.

Mitsuzuka was named the minister of foreign affairs in June 1989 in the cabinet headed by Prime Minister Sousuke Uno. When Mitsuzuka was in office, he harshly criticised the Japan firms, arguing that they created an image of Japan as "trying to make money like a thief at fire." His term as foreign minister lasted until August 1989.

Mitsuzuka was appointed minister of finance in the second cabinet of Ryutaro Hashimoto on 7 November 1996, replacing Wataru Kubo in the post. He resigned from office on 28 January 1998 to take responsibility for corrupt behavior by the officials at the ministry, although he was not personally involved in the incident. Hikaru Matsunaga succeeded him as finance minister on 1 February 1998.

=== Other positions and retirement ===
Mitsuzuka served as chairman of the Japan Palau Friendship Diet Representatives' Association. He retired from politics in August 2003 due to health concerns.

== Death ==
Mitsuzuka injured his back in June 2003, leading to deterioration of his health. He died of illness at a Tokyo hospital on 25 April 2004. He was 76.

Political offices
Preceded by Tokuo Yamashita	Minister of Transport; 1985–1986	Succeeded by Ryutaro Hashimoto
Preceded by Hajime Tamura	Ministry of International Trade and Industry; 1988–1989	Succeeded by Seiroku Kajiyama
Preceded by Sosuke Uno	Minister for Foreign Affairs; 1989	Succeeded by Taro Nakayama
Preceded by Wataru Kubo	Minister of Finance; 1996–1998	Succeeded by Ryutaro Hashimoto
House of Representatives (Japan)
Preceded by Ihei Ochi	Chair, Rules and Administration Committee of the House of Representatives of Japan; 1987–1988	Succeeded by Toshio Yamaguchi
Party political offices
Preceded by Sadanori Yamanaka	Chair, Tax System Research Council of the Liberal Democratic Party of Japan; 1989	Succeeded by Takeo Nishioka
Preceded by Keijiro Murata	Chair, Policy Research Council of the Liberal Democratic Party of Japan; 1989–1990	Succeeded by Mutsuki Kato
Preceded by Yoshirō Mori	Chair, Policy Research Council of the Liberal Democratic Party of Japan; 1992–1993	Succeeded by Ryutaro Hashimoto
Preceded by Yoshirō Mori	Secretary-General of the Liberal Democratic Party; 1995	Succeeded by Koichi Kato
Preceded by Shintaro Abe	Head of Seiwa Seisaku Kenkyūkai; 1991–1998	Succeeded by Yoshirō Mori
