= Daijiro Hashimoto =

- 橋本 大二郎
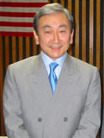

Governor of Kōchi Prefecture
- In office 7 December 1991 – 6 December 2007
- Monarch: Akihito
- Preceded by: Tsutomu Nakauchi
- Succeeded by: Masanao Ozaki

Personal details
- Born: 12 January 1947 (age 79) Tokyo, Japan
- Party: Independent
- Parent: Ryogo Hashimoto (father)
- Relatives: Ryutaro Hashimoto (brother); Gaku Hashimoto (nephew)
- Education: Keio University

Daijiro Hashimoto (Japanese: 橋本 大二郎, Hepburn: Hashimoto Daijirō; born 12 January 1947) is a politically independent former governor of the Kōchi Prefecture who served from 1991 to 2007, with an intermediate resignation in 2004 to test support after a scandal alleging transactions between his campaign aide and a construction company in 1991. He is also the host of "Wide Scramble", a morning show on TV Asahi. His policies included encouraging a more open government and the implementation of a green tax to help preserve forests. He is considered to be a reformer. Hashimoto is the brother of the former Japanese Prime Minister Ryutaro Hashimoto.
