= First Hashimoto cabinet =

1996 cabinet of Japan

First Hashimoto Cabinet
- 82nd Cabinet of Japan

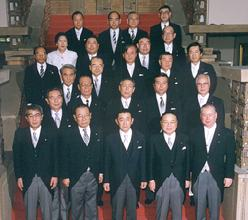
- Prime Minister Ryūtarō Hashimoto (front row, centre) with the newly-elected cabinet inside the Kantei, January 11, 1996
- Date formed: January 11, 1996
- Date dissolved: November 7, 1996

People and organisations
- Head of state: Emperor Akihito
- Head of government: Ryūtarō Hashimoto
- Deputy head of government: Wataru Kubo
- Member party: LDP–JSP–NPS Coalition
- Status in legislature: Coalition majority
- Opposition party: New Frontier Party
- Opposition leader: Ichirō Ozawa

History
- Predecessor: Murayama Cabinet
- Successor: Second Hashimoto Cabinet

The First Hashimoto Cabinet was formed in January 1996 under the leadership of Ryutaro Hashimoto, following the resignation of Tomiichi Murayama as Prime Minister of Japan and head of the coalition between the Liberal Democratic Party, Japan Socialist Party and New Party Sakigake. The smaller Socialist party relinquished the leadership of the government to the LDP, which was the largest party in the Diet and Hashimoto (LDP President since September 1995) assumed the premiership, becoming the first LDP Prime Minister since August 1993.

The three-party coalition continued, although all ministers from the Murayama Cabinet were replaced. The Socialists renamed themselves as the Social Democratic Party and Secretary-general Wataru Kubo became Deputy Prime Minister and Finance Minister. The cabinet lasted until November 1996, when it was dissolved following the 1996 general election and replaced with the Second Hashimoto Cabinet.

== Election of the prime minister ==
11 January 1996 Absolute majority required
House of Representatives
Choice	Runoff Vote
Choice	Votes
Ryutaro Hashimoto	288 / 511
Ichirō Ozawa	167 / 511
Others and Abstentions (Including Speaker and Deputy)	56 / 511
Source Diet Minutes

== Ministers ==
Liberal Democratic
New Party Sakigake
Social Democratic
R = Member of the House of Representatives
C = Member of the House of Councillors

Cabinet of Ryutaro Hashimoto from January 11 to November 7, 1996
Portfolio	Minister		Term of Office
Prime Minister	Ryutaro Hashimoto	R	January 11, 1996 - July 30, 1998
Deputy Prime Minister; Minister of Finance	Wataru Kubo	C	January 11, 1996 - November 7, 1996
Minister of Justice	Ritsuko Nagao	-	January 11, 1996 - November 7, 1996
Minister of Foreign Affairs	Yukihiko Ikeda	R	January 11, 1996 - September 11, 1997
Minister of Education	Mikio Okuda	R	January 11, 1996 - November 7, 1996
Minister of Health and Welfare	Naoto Kan	R	January 11, 1996 - November 7, 1996
Minister of Agriculture, Forestry and Fisheries	Ichizo Ohara	R	January 11, 1996 - November 7, 1996
Minister of International Trade and Industry	Shunpei Tsukahara	R	January 11, 1996 - November 7, 1996
Minister of Transport	Yoshiyuki Kamei	R	January 11, 1996 - November 7, 1996
Minister of Posts and Telecommunications	Ichiro Hino	R	January 11, 1996 - November 7, 1996
Minister of Labour	Takanobu Nagai	R	January 11, 1996 - November 7, 1996
Minister of Construction	Eiichi Nakao	R	January 11, 1996 - November 7, 1996
Minister of Home Affairs; Director of the National Public Safety Commission	Hiroyuki Kurata	C	January 11, 1996 - November 7, 1996
Chief Cabinet Secretary	Seiroku Kajiyama	R	January 11, 1996 - September 11, 1997
Director of the Management and Coordination Agency	Sekisuke Nakanishi	R	January 11, 1996 - November 7, 1996
Director of the Hokkaido Development Agency; Director of the Okinawa Development Agency	Saburo Okabe	C	January 11, 1996 - November 7, 1996
Director of the Japan Defense Agency	Hideo Usui	R	January 11, 1996 - November 7, 1996
Director of the Economic Planning Agency	Shusei Tanaka	R	January 11, 1996 - November 7, 1996
Director of the Science and Technology Agency	Hidenao Nakagawa	R	January 11, 1996 - November 7, 1996
Director of the Environment Agency	Sukio Iwadare	R	January 11, 1996 - November 7, 1996
Director of the National Land Agency	Kazumi Suzuki	C	January 11, 1996 - November 7, 1996
