= Minoru Kawasaki (politician) =

Japanese politician

- 川崎 稔

Member of the House of Councillors
- In office 29 July 2007 – 28 July 2013
- Preceded by: Takao Jinnouchi
- Succeeded by: Yūhei Yamashita
- Constituency: Saga at-large

Personal details
- Born: 7 March 1961 (age 65) Saga City, Saga, Japan
- Party: DPP (since 2025)
- Other political affiliations: Democratic (2004–2013); Independent (2013–2025)
- Education: Kyoto University

Minoru Kawasaki (川崎 稔, Kawasaki Minoru; born March 7, 1961) is a former Japanese politician of the Democratic Party of Japan, a member of the House of Councillors in the Diet (national legislature). A native of Saga Prefecture and graduate of Kyoto University, he worked at the Bank of Japan from 1984 until 2004 when he ran unsuccessfully for the House of Councillors. He ran again in 2007 and was elected for the first time.
