= Hiromi Iwanaga =

Japanese politician

- 岩永 浩美
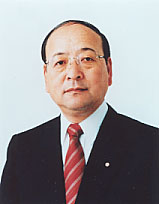
- Official portrait, 2001

Member of the House of Councillors
- In office 19 November 1995 – 25 July 2010
- Preceded by: Seijiro Otsuka
- Succeeded by: Takamaro Fukuoka
- Constituency: Saga at-large

Member of the Saga Prefectural Assembly
- In office 1975–1995

Personal details
- Born: 17 June 1942 (age 84) Arita, Saga, Japan
- Party: Liberal Democratic
- Education: Chuo University

Hiromi Iwanaga (岩永 浩美, Iwanaga Hiromi; born June 17, 1942) is a Japanese politician of the Liberal Democratic Party, a member of the House of Councillors in the Diet (national legislature). A native of Arita, Saga and dropout of Chuo University, he had served in the assembly of Saga Prefecture for six terms since 1975 and was elected to the House of Councillors for the first time in 1995.
