= Ryutaro Hashimoto =

Prime Minister of Japan from 1996 to 1998

- 橋本 龍太郎
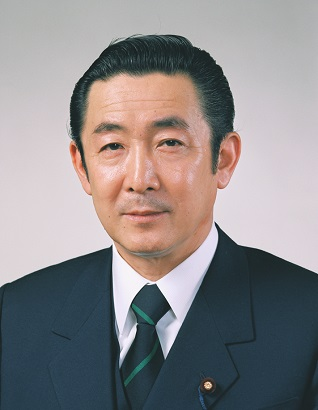
- Official portrait, 1996

Prime Minister of Japan
- In office 11 January 1996 – 30 July 1998
- Monarch: Akihito
- Deputy: Wataru Kubo (1996)
- Preceded by: Tomiichi Murayama
- Succeeded by: Keizō Obuchi

President of the Liberal Democratic Party
- In office 1 October 1995 – 24 July 1998
- Secretary-General: Koichi Kato
- Preceded by: Yōhei Kōno
- Succeeded by: Keizō Obuchi

Deputy Prime Minister of Japan
- In office 2 October 1995 – 11 January 1996
- Prime Minister: Tomiichi Murayama
- Preceded by: Yōhei Kōno
- Succeeded by: Wataru Kubo
Ministerial offices
Director-General of the Okinawa Development Agency
In office 5 December 2000 – 6 January 2001
Prime Minister	Yoshirō Mori
Preceded by	Yasuo Fukuda
Succeeded by	Office abolished
Minister of International Trade and Industry
In office 30 June 1994 – 11 January 1996
Prime Minister	Tomiichi Murayama
Preceded by	Eijiro Hata
Succeeded by	Shunpei Tsukahara
Minister of Finance
In office 10 August 1989 – 14 October 1991
Prime Minister	Toshiki Kaifu
Preceded by	Tatsuo Murayama
Succeeded by	Toshiki Kaifu
Minister of Transport
In office 22 July 1986 – 6 November 1987
Prime Minister	Yasuhiro Nakasone
Preceded by	Hiroshi Mitsuzuka
Succeeded by	Shintaro Ishihara
Minister of Health and Welfare
In office 7 December 1978 – 9 November 1979
Prime Minister	Masayoshi Ōhira
Preceded by	Tatsuo Ozawa
Succeeded by	Kyoichi Noro
Party political offices
Secretary-General of the Liberal Democratic Party
In office June 1989 – August 1989
President	Sōsuke Uno
Preceded by	Shintaro Abe
Succeeded by	Ichirō Ozawa

Member of the House of Representatives
- In office 21 November 1963 – 8 August 2005
- Preceded by: Ryōgo Hashimoto
- Succeeded by: Michiyoshi Yunoki
- Constituency: Okayama 2nd (1963–1996); Okayama 4th (1996–2005)

Personal details
- Born: 29 July 1937 Sōja, Okayama, Japan
- Died: 1 July 2006 (aged 68) Shinjuku, Tokyo, Japan
- Party: Liberal Democratic
- Spouse: Kumiko Nakamura (m. 1966)
- Children: Gaku Hashimoto
- Parent: Ryōgo Hashimoto (father)
- Relatives: Daijiro Hashimoto (brother)
- Education: Keio University; National Taiwan Normal University
- Ryutaro Hashimoto's voice Hashimoto at a press conference following the first Asia–Europe Meeting summit Recorded 2 March 1996

Ryutaro Hashimoto (橋本 龍太郎, Hashimoto Ryūtarō; 29 July 1937 – 1 July 2006) was a Japanese politician who served as prime minister of Japan from 1996 to 1998.

Born in Okayama Prefecture, Hashimoto graduated from Keio University in 1960 and entered the National Diet in 1963. He rose through the ranks of the Liberal Democratic Party and became major figure in the Tanaka/Takeshita faction, and served as health and welfare minister under Masayoshi Ōhira, transport minister under Yasuhiro Nakasone, and finance minister under Toshiki Kaifu. In 1994, he became minister of international trade and industry, then became prime minister in 1996 as the head of a coalition with the Social Democratic Party and New Party Sakigake. During his tenure, Hashimoto sought currency reform and tried to revive the Japanese economy. He resigned after the LDP lost its majority in the 1998 upper house election, but remained leader of his faction until a scandal in 2004. He retired from politics in 2005.

== Early life ==
Hashimoto was born on 29 July 1937, in Sōja in Okayama Prefecture. His father, Ryōgo Hashimoto, was a cabinet minister under Prime Minister Nobusuke Kishi. Following his father's lead, Ryutaro received his degree in political science from Keio University in 1960. He then studied Chinese at National Taiwan Normal University and was elected to the House of Representatives of Japan in 1963.

== Early political career ==
He moved through the ranks of the Liberal Democratic Party over the next twenty years, landing a spot as Minister of Health and Welfare under premier Masayoshi Ōhira in 1978, and in 1980 became the LDP's director of finance and public administration. He again became a cabinet minister in 1986 under Yasuhiro Nakasone, and in 1989 became secretary general of the LDP, the highest rank short of party president (if the LDP is in government, usually also the prime minister.)

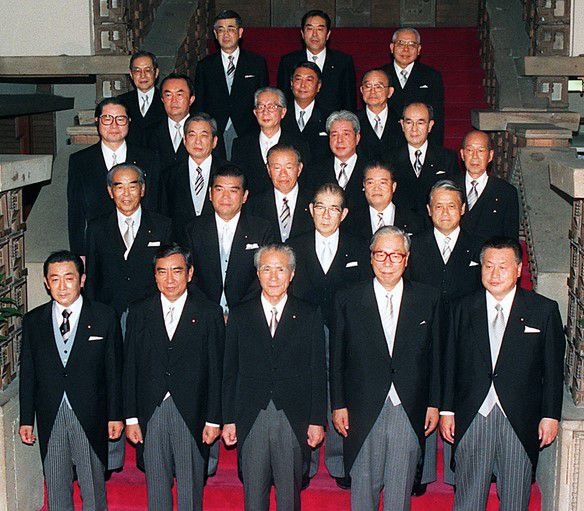
Hashimoto with Tomiichi Murayama and the Ministers of Murayama Government (at the Prime Minister's Official Residence on 30 June 1994)

Hashimoto became a key figure in the strong LDP faction founded by Kakuei Tanaka in the 1970s, which later fell into the hands of Noboru Takeshita, who then was tainted by the Recruit scandal of 1988. In 1991, the press had discovered that one of Hashimoto's secretaries had been involved in an illegal financial dealing. Hashimoto retired as Minister of Finance from the Second Kaifu Cabinet. Following the collapse of the bubble economy, the LDP momentarily lost power in 1993/94 during the Hosokawa and Hata anti-LDP coalition cabinets negotiated by LDP defector Ichirō Ozawa. Hashimoto was brought back to the cabinet when the LDP under Yōhei Kōno returned to power in 1994 by entering a ruling coalition with traditional archrival Japanese Socialist Party (JSP), giving the prime ministership to the junior partner, and the minor New Party Harbinger (NPH). Hashimoto became Minister of International Trade and Industry in the Murayama Cabinet of Tomiichi Murayama. As the chief of MITI, Hashimoto made himself known at meetings of APEC and at summit conferences.

In September 1995, Yōhei Kōno did not stand for another term. Hashimoto won the election to LDP president against Jun'ichirō Koizumi 304 votes to 87, and succeeded Kōno as leader of the party and as deputy prime minister in the Murayama cabinet.

== Premiership (1996–1998) ==
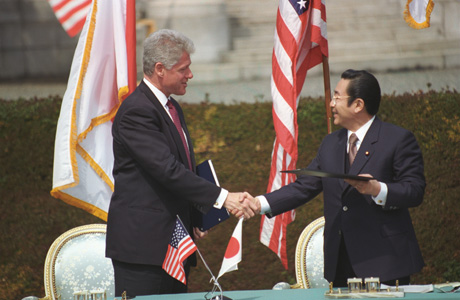
Hashimoto with Bill Clinton (at Akasaka Palace on 17 April 1996)

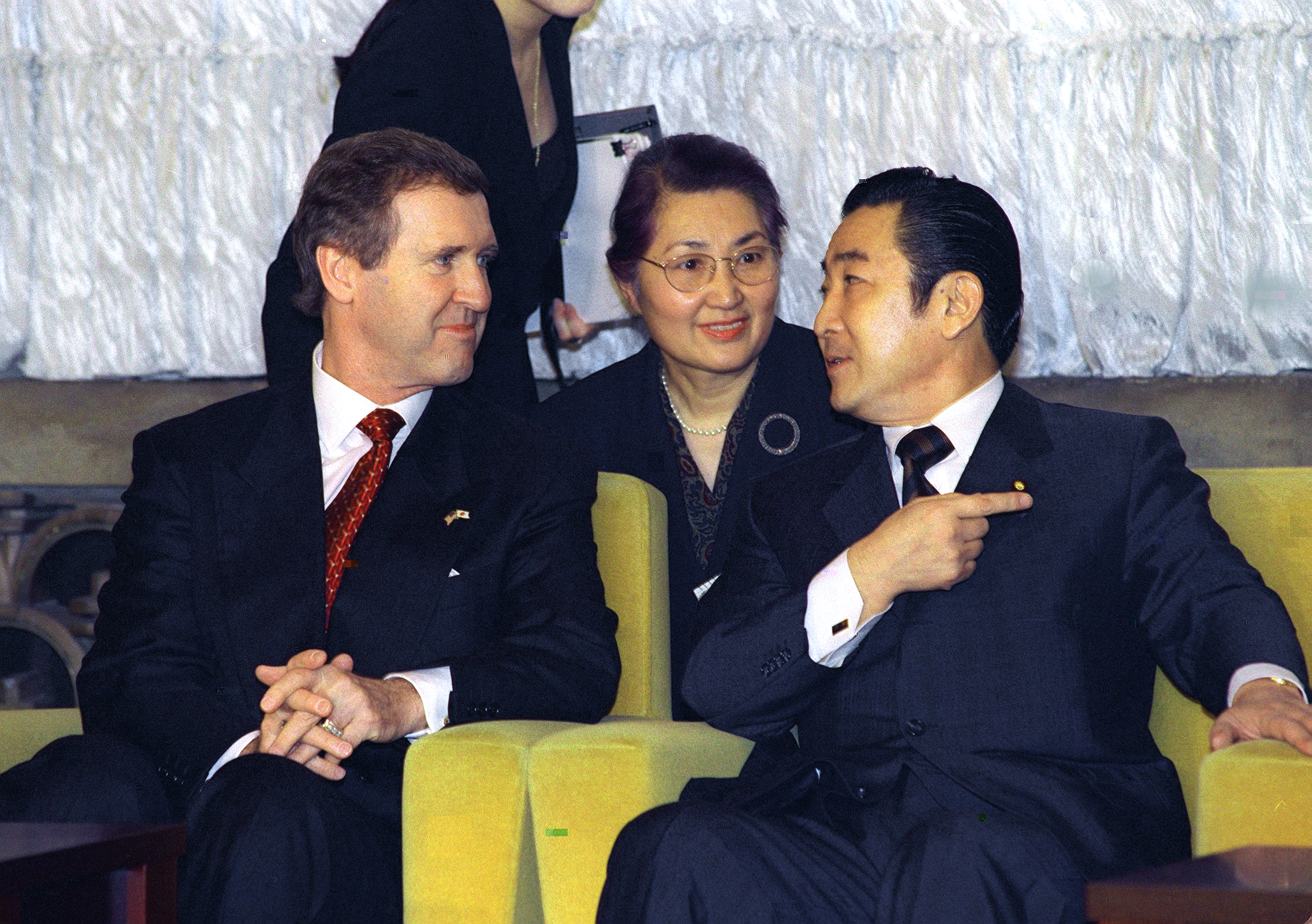
Hashimoto with William Cohen (at the Prime Minister's Official Residence on 9 April 1997)

When Murayama stepped down in 1996, the 135th National Diet elected Hashimoto to become Japan's 82nd prime minister – he was elected against NFP leader Ichirō Ozawa with 288 votes to 167 in the lower house and 158 to 69 in the upper house – and lead the continued LDP-JSP-NPH coalition government (First Hashimoto Cabinet).

Hashimoto reached an agreement with the United States for the repatriation of MCAS Futenma, a controversial U.S. military base in an urban area of Okinawa, in April 1996. The deal was opposed by Japan's foreign ministry and defense agency but was backed by Hashimoto's American counterpart, President Bill Clinton. The repatriation of the base has yet to be completed as of 2015, as Okinawans have opposed efforts to relocate the base to a new site. Hashimoto's domestic popularity increased during the Japanese-US trade dispute when he publicly confronted Mickey Kantor, US Trade Representative for the Clinton administration.

Hashimoto's popularity was largely based on his attitude. When asked about why Japanese car dealerships did not sell American cars, he answered, "Why doesn't IBM sell Fujitsu computers?" When Japan's economy did not seem to be recovering from its 1991 collapse, Hashimoto ordered a commission of experts from the private sector to look into improving the Japanese market for foreign competition, and eventually opening it completely.

On 27 September 1996, the Hashimoto cabinet dissolved the lower house of the National Diet. In the ensuing general lower house election in October, the LDP made gains while its coalition partners SDP – the JSP had been renamed briefly after the formation of the Hashimoto cabinet – and NPH lost seats. Both parties ended the coalition with the LDP, but they remained Diet allies in a cooperation outside the cabinet (kakugai kyōryoku) until 1998. Thus, the LDP and the Second Hashimoto Cabinet safely controlled both houses of the Diet, although it was initially technically in the minority by a few seats in the lower house, and well short of a majority in the upper house. It was the first single-party LDP government since 1993. Having achieved this, Hashimoto was confirmed without challenger as party president in September 1997.

Hashimoto's government raised the Japanese consumption tax in 1997. Although the government implemented a reduction in the personal income tax prior to raising the consumption tax, the hike still had a negative effect on consumer demand in Japan.

During the Upper House regular election 1998, the LDP failed to restore its majority (lost in 1989 and not to be regained until 2016) and instead lost more seats. Hashimoto resigned to take responsibility for this failure, and was succeeded as LDP president and Prime Minister by Foreign Minister Keizō Obuchi.

== Later political life ==
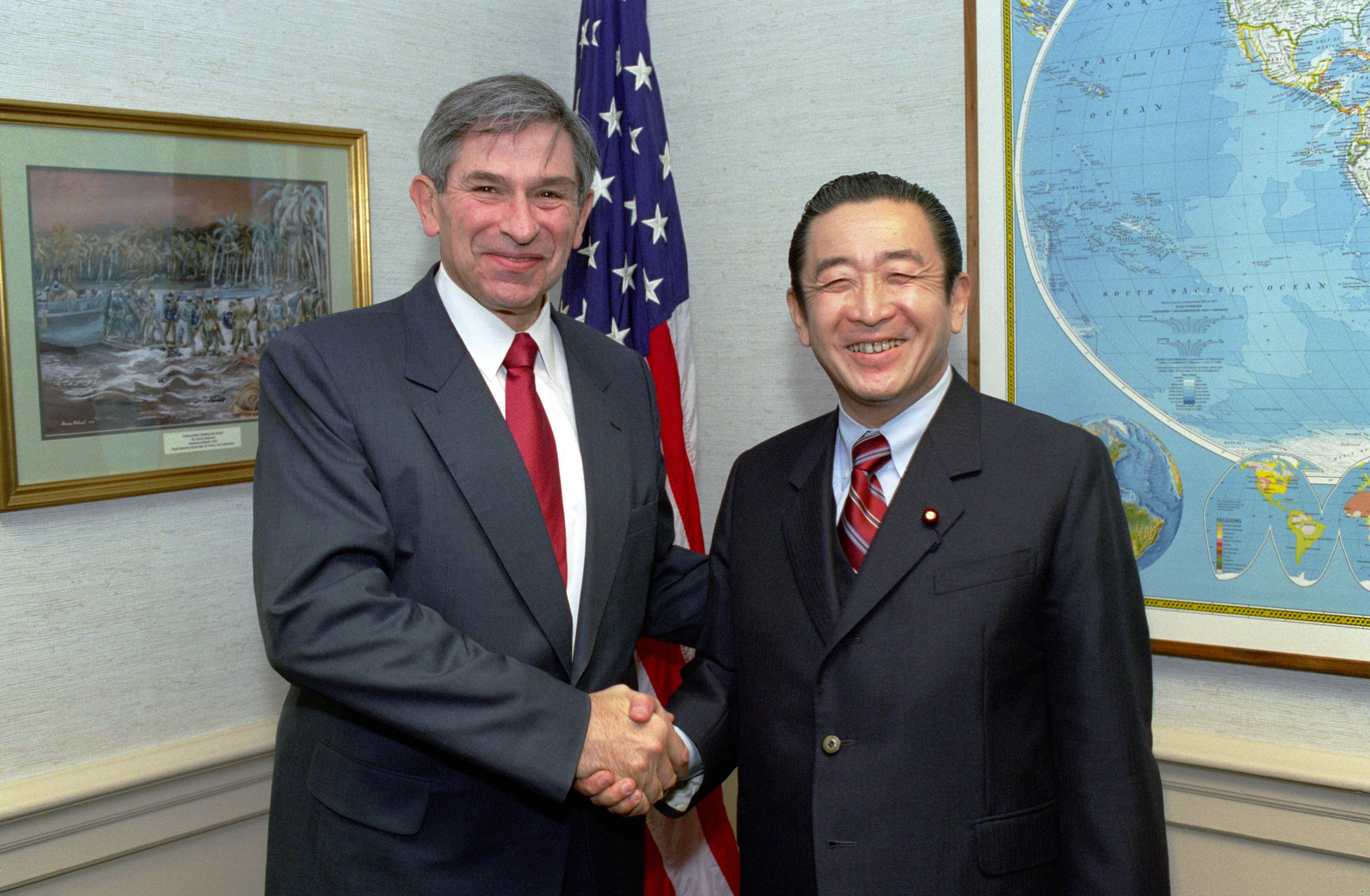
Hashimoto with Paul Wolfowitz at the Pentagon in October 2002

Hashimoto stayed in a LDP adviser party, and in the 2nd Mori Cabinet the Minister of Okinawa Development Agency and Minister in charge of administrative reform were appointed. He led the faction for several years. In 2001 he was one of the leading candidates to take office as prime minister but lost in the election of the more popular Prime Minister Junichiro Koizumi.

Hashimoto's faction began to collapse late in 2003 while debating over whether to re-elect Koizumi. In December 2004, Hashimoto stepped down as faction leader when he was found to have accepted a ¥100 million cheque from the Japan Dental Association, and announced that he would not run for re-election in his lower house district.

On World Water Day (22 March) in 2004, United Nations Secretary-General Kofi Annan established a global advisory board on Water and Sanitation, and appointed Ryutaro Hashimoto as its chairman. Just prior to his death, Hashimoto submitted a letter addressed to "The People of the World" for publication in the book Water Voices from Around The World (October 2007), which is a book affiliated with the United Nations' decade of water (2005–15). In his letter, he addressed water-related disasters around the world, with an urgent appeal to the United Nations to halve the number of deaths caused by water disasters by 2015. Hashimoto closes this letter by writing: "An old proverb says 'Dripping water wears away the stone.' I humbly suggest, that through steadfast efforts, we can overcome any obstacle our civilization may encounter in the coming decade."

== Personal life ==
He was married to Kumiko Hashimoto (born 1941) (橋本 久美子 Hashimoto Kumiko), and the couple had two sons and three daughters: Ryu, Gaku, Hiroko, Atsuko, and Danko.

An exchange program between the Scout Association of Japan and the Boy Scouts of America was started in 1998, at the suggestion of then-Prime Minister Hashimoto in a 1996 meeting with U.S. President Bill Clinton. In 1998, he was presented with the Silver World Award by Jere Ratcliffe, Chief Scout Executive of the Boy Scouts of America, "for outstanding contributions to young people on an international level".

== Death ==
In June 2006, Hashimoto was hospitalized in an ICU to undergo surgery to remove a large part of his colon. On 1 July 2006 at the age of 68, Hashimoto died from complications of multiple organ failure and septic shock at the National Center for Global Health and Medicine in Shinjuku, Tokyo, just 4 weeks before his 69th birthday.

== Honours ==
- Golden Pheasant Award of the Scout Association of Japan (1992)
- Grand Cordon of the Order of the Chrysanthemum (1 July 2006; posthumous)
- Senior Second Rank (1 July 2006; posthumous)
- Grand Cross with Diamonds of the Order of the Sun of Peru (1996)

Party political offices
Preceded by Shintaro Abe	Secretary-General of the Liberal Democratic Party; 1989	Succeeded by Ichiro Ozawa
Preceded by Yōhei Kōno	President of the Liberal Democratic Party; 1995–1998	Succeeded by Keizō Obuchi
Preceded by Tamisuke Watanuki	Head of Heisei Kenkyūkai; 2000–2004	Vacant Title next held by Yūji Tsushima
Political offices
Preceded by Tatsuo Ozawa	Minister of Health and Welfare; 1978–1979	Succeeded by Kyoichi Noro
Preceded by Hiroshi Mitsuzuka	Minister of Transport; 1986–1987	Succeeded by Shintaro Ishihara
Preceded by Tatsuo Murayama	Minister of Finance; 1989–1991	Succeeded by Toshiki Kaifu
Preceded by Eijiro Hata	Minister of International Trade and Industry; 1994–1996	Succeeded by Shunpei Tsukahara
Preceded by Yōhei Kōno	Deputy Prime Minister of Japan; 1995–1996	Succeeded by Wataru Kubo
Preceded by Tomiichi Murayama	Prime Minister of Japan; 1996–1998	Succeeded by Keizō Obuchi
Preceded by Yasuo Fukuda	Director General of the Okinawa Development Agency; 2000–2001	Merged with Cabinet Office
New office	Minister of State for Okinawa and Northern Territories Affairs; 2001	Succeeded by Kōji Omi
New office	Minister of State for Regulatory Reform; 2001	Succeeded by Nobuteru Ishihara
