= Mio Sugita =

Japanese politician (born 1967)

- 杉田 水脈
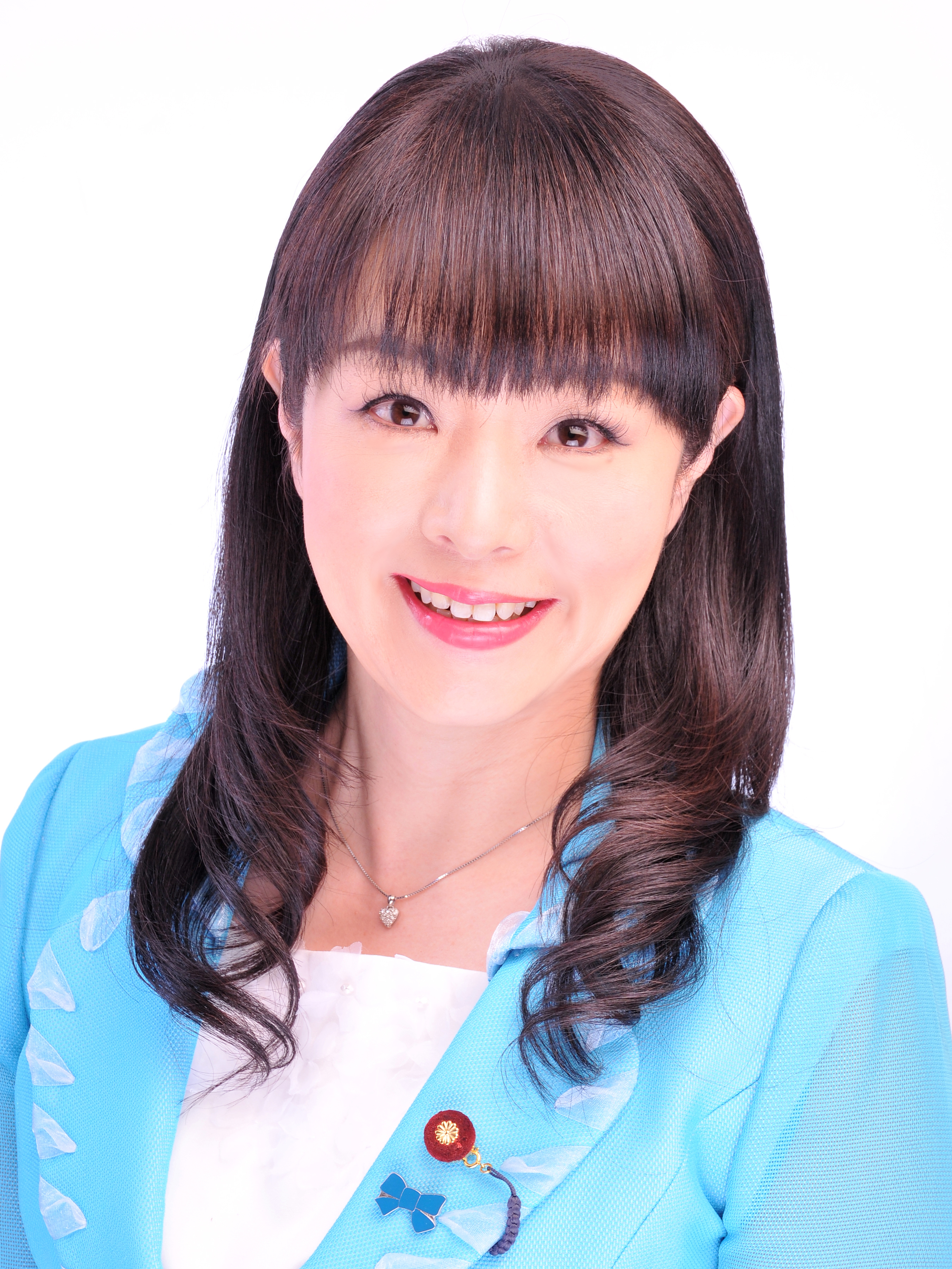
- Official portrait, 2018

Member of the House of Representatives
- In office 23 October 2017 – 9 October 2024
- Preceded by: Multi-member district
- Succeeded by: Multi-member district
- Constituency: Chugoku PR
- In office 17 December 2012 – 21 November 2014
- Preceded by: Multi-member district
- Succeeded by: Multi-member district
- Constituency: Kinki PR

Personal details
- Born: 22 April 1967 (age 59) Kobe, Japan
- Party: LDP (since 2017)
- Other political affiliations: Your (2010–2012); JRP (2012–2014); PJK (2014–2017)
- Children: 1
- Education: Tottori University

Mio Sugita (Japanese: 杉田 水脈, Hepburn: Sugita Mio; born 22 April 1967) is a Japanese politician and member of the Liberal Democratic Party of Japan. She served in the House of Representatives from 2012 to 2014, and again from 2017 to 2024.

Sugita has faced criticism for her statements and views, including comments regarding gender diversity and LGBT issues as well as Ainu and Korean individuals. She stated on a livestream in 2015 that the LGBT community should not receive support from taxpayer money, and repeated her claim in a monthly magazine piece in 2018.

The Kishida cabinet appointed her Parliamentary Vice-Minister for Internal Affairs and Communications in August 2022. She has since resigned from this position, because, according to Kishida, she had no intention of retracting some of her statements and to avoid disrupting administrative affairs. When interviewed, Sugita insisted that she had never dismissed diversity and had not discriminated against sexual minorities.

In December 2022, at the request of minister Takeaki Matsumoto, Sugita retracted and apologized for her past remarks regarding minorities, saying that they had "lacked consideration."

== Education and early career ==
Sugita graduated from the Faculty of Agriculture of Tottori University in 1990.

Following her graduation, worked as a Nishinomiya government employee and member of the Japan Restoration Party and the Next Generation Party.

After unsuccessfully running in the 2014 election for the Hyogo Prefectural 6th District as a member of the Party for Japanese Kokoro, Sugita joined the Liberal Democratic Party and ran for the Proportional Chugoku Block as a member. She was made a representative of that Block by the party without having to rely on a direct election.

== Political views ==
=== Women using maiden names ===
A debate has been continuing in Japan on whether or not married couples should be allowed to retain their own names after marriage and thus have different surnames. At present, married people must share the same surname, whether the husband's name or the wife's maiden name. During a Diet session on the issue in January 2020, a female Diet member shouted out of turn, "if you don't want your husband's name, you shouldn't get married!" The Diet member was reported to have been Sugita.

=== Nurseries ===
In July 2016, Sugita wrote an article in the Sankei Shimbun opposing increases in the number of nurseries.

=== Comfort women ===
Sugita has called the comfort women issue a fabrication. In 2013, Sugita joined fellow Japan Restoration Party members Yuzuru Nishida and Hiromu Nakamaru at the Study Group for Japan's Rebirth based in Los Angeles to request removal of a statue in Glendale, Los Angeles County, California. The statue commemorates as many as 200,000 comfort women from Korea and other countries forced into sex slavery by Japanese soldiers during World War II. Statue opponents, including Sugita, said, "the women acted willingly" and that the numbers of them reported are inflated. The three politicians also stated that they wanted the Japanese Ministry of Foreign Affairs to retract an apology made in the 1990s to comfort women.

=== Ainu culture and people ===
In 2016, commenting on a blog post, Sugita referred to participants wearing indigenous clothing at a U.N. gathering as "middle-aged cosplayers." Among these participants were members dressed in traditional Korean and Ainu clothing, present to discuss the "elimination of discrimination against women."

In November 2023, Sugita made discriminatory remarks toward Ainu people that caused outrage.

=== Shiori Itō rape case ===
Sugita appeared in a 2018 BBC documentary, "Japan's Secret Shame", which detailed the alleged rape of Shiori Itō. In the interview, Sugita was quoted as saying, "With this case, there were clear errors on her part as a woman: drinking that much in front of a man and losing her memory. With things like this I think men are the ones who suffer significant damage."

Sugita also laughed at an illustration with a woman apparently made to look like Itō and the words "failure at sleeping around for business".

The video has subsequently drawn criticism on social media. Sugita was criticized by Lully Miura, an instructor at the Policy Alternatives Research Institute at the University of Tokyo who wrote, "Behavior as if questioning the actions of the victim instead of the perpetrator will spread the misunderstanding that it cannot be helped if something happens to a woman when she gets drunk in front of a man. There seems to be a sense of dislike against women strongly speaking up to men that is embedded in Sugita's attitude." When approached for comment about the documentary by the Mainichi Shimbun, Sugita stated the video had been edited in a way that misrepresented her intentions and she was considering releasing her own footage of the interview.

In September 2020, at a party gathering for the LDP government, participants claimed that Sugita remarked, "Women can tell lies as much as they want," during a briefing about the government's support program for sexual violence victims. The remark was likely related to Itō, a controversial figure due to her rape allegations, who was recently selected by Time magazine, as one of the world's 100 Most Influential People of 2020. Sugita later denied having made those comments.

In October 2022 Sugita was ordered by the Tokyo High Court to pay Itō ¥550,000 in damages for clicking "like" on several Twitter tweets that Itō alleged defamed her. In overturning the dismissal of the litigation by the Tokyo District Court, the High Court found that Sugita's actions intentionally harmed Itō's dignity.

=== LGBT issues ===
In June 2015, Sugita made an appearance on the Japanese Culture Channel Sakura television program Hi Izuru Kuni Yori alongside music composer Koichi Sugiyama and fellow politician Kyoko Nakayama in which she claimed that there was no need for LGBT education in schools, dismissing concerns about high suicide rates among the community. She went on to quip "Where is the justification in [spending taxpayer's money] to support homosexual people who are not 'productive' [i.e., do not produce children]".

In July 2018, Sugita wrote a controversial magazine article that said tax money should not be used to fund LGBT right initiatives because same-sex couples cannot reproduce and have "no productivity." Her comments were denounced by various prominent Japanese politicians, including former Japanese prime minister Yukio Hatoyama, with thousands of protesters gathering outside the headquarters of the Liberal Democratic Party on July 27, 2018, to demand her resignation from the party.

Two months later, a group of LGBT politicians and civil rights leaders demanded that she account for the comments.

=== 2022 cabinet reshuffle ===
Sugita was appointed as Parliamentary Vice-Minister at the Ministry of Internal Affairs and Communications in the reshuffled cabinet of Prime Minister Fumio Kishida in August 2022.

=== Anti-Korean sentiment ===
Sugita has made a number of blog posts that were viewed by others as discriminatory towards Korean people. In one such post, she described women dressed in traditional Korean clothing as "[looking] filthy". In 2023, she was found guilty in a non-binding case by the Legal Affairs Bureau of racial abuse and human rights violations against Korean people.

=== 2025 House of Councillors election ===
In July 2025, Sugita ran as an LDP candidate for the House of Councillors, losing the election. She blamed the far-right Conservative Party of Japan for splitting conservative votes, causing her loss.
