= Nariaki Nakayama =

Japanese politician (born 1943)

- 中山 成彬
- Official portrait, 2000

Leader of Kibō no Tō
- In office 28 May 2019 – 1 October 2021
- Preceded by: Shigefumi Matsuzawa
- Succeeded by: Position abolished

Minister of Land, Infrastructure, Transport and Tourism
- In office 24 September 2008 – 28 September 2008
- Prime Minister: Tarō Asō
- Preceded by: Sadakazu Tanigaki
- Succeeded by: Kazuyoshi Kaneko

Minister of Education, Culture, Sports, Science and Technology
- In office 27 September 2004 – 31 October 2005
- Prime Minister: Junichiro Koizumi
- Preceded by: Takeo Kawamura
- Succeeded by: Kenji Kosaka

Member of House of Representatives
- In office 23 October 2017 – 14 October 2021
- Constituency: Kyushu PR
- In office 21 December 2012 – 21 November 2014
- Constituency: Kyushu PR
- In office 20 October 1996 – 21 July 2009
- Preceded by: Constituency established
- Succeeded by: Hidesaburo Kawamura
- Constituency: Miyazaki 1st
- In office 6 July 1986 – 18 June 1993
- Preceded by: Osanori Koyama
- Succeeded by: Seat abolished
- Constituency: Miyazaki 2nd

Personal details
- Born: 7 June 1943 (age 83) Kobayashi, Miyazaki, Japan
- Party: Independent (since 2021)
- Other political affiliations: LDP (1986–2010); SPJ (2010–2012); JRP (2012–2014); PJK (2014–2017); KnT (2017–2021)
- Spouse: Kyoko Nakayama
- Education: University of Tokyo

Nariaki Nakayama (中山 成彬, Nakayama Nariaki; born 7 June 1943) is a Japanese politician who has served as leader of Kibō no Tō from 2019 to 2021. He served as Minister of Education, Culture, Sports, Science and Technology in the Cabinet of Junichiro Koizumi and later as Minister of Land, Infrastructure, Transport and Tourism under Tarō Asō.

After only four days in office he resigned due to a series of gaffes. Appointed on 24 September 2008, he resigned on 28 September 2008. After being de-endorsed by the LDP he lost his seat in the 2009 general election, eventually returning to the Diet as a member of the Japan Restoration Party in the 2012 general election. He lost his seat again in the 2014 general election.

Nakayama's beliefs have been met with controversy, and have been characterized as historical revisionism. He denies the Nanjing Massacre and has pushed to censor textbook mentions of comfort women.

== Background ==
Nakayama graduated from the Faculty of Law at the University of Tokyo in 1966, and then joined the Ministry of Finance. In 1986 he was elected to the House of Representatives for the first time, and in September 2004, he became the Minister of Education, Culture, Sports, Science and Technology. He is married to Kyoko Nakayama, also a conservative politician.

== Conservative positions ==
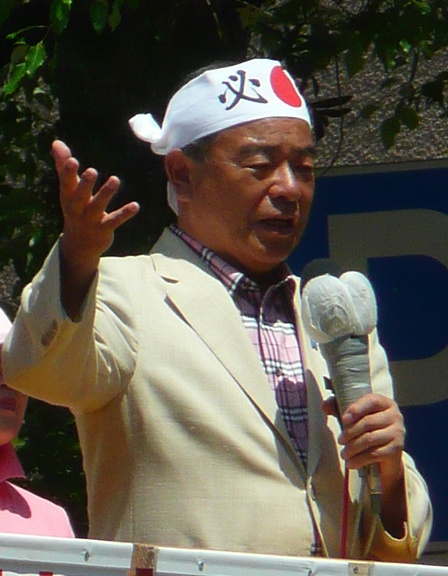
Nakayama in 2009

Nakayama is affiliated with the Nippon Kaigi, a revisionist, ultra-nationalist organization. When he was a member of the Liberal Democratic Party, Nakayama was prominent in efforts to censor sections of junior high textbooks in Japan that made references to comfort women. As of 2013, he continued to deny that women were forced to work in brothels during wartime. He claims that the Nanjing Massacre was a complete fabrication, was a supporter of right-wing filmmaker Satoru Mizushima's 2007 film The Truth about Nanjing, which denied that the massacre ever occurred.

During the first administration of Prime Minister Shinzō Abe, Nakayama made efforts to revise the Kono statement of 1993. He has continued to express right-wing conservative visions of history.

== As a four-day cabinet minister ==
In the Cabinet of Prime Minister Taro Aso, appointed on 24 September 2008, Nakayama was appointed as Minister of Construction and Transport. He made several controversial statements since his appointment, such as saying: "I will stand at the forefront to destroy the Japan Teachers' Union, which is a cancer for Japanese education". In a press conference related to his Minister of Tourism portfolio, he declared that Japan is basically "ethnically homogeneous," which greatly angered the Ainu, an indigenous ethnic minority living mostly in Northern Japan. He also said that Japanese people "do not like nor desire foreigners". He resigned on 27 September 2008.

== Loss of LDP confidence and loss of lower house seat ==
In the 2009 general election the LDP was reluctant to run Nakayama as a candidate. He ran as an independent and lost his seat.

== Move to the Sunrise Party of Japan, Japan Restoration Party, and Party for Future Generations ==
On 21 June 2010 Nakayama and his wife Kyoko announced that they would move from the Liberal Democratic Party to the Sunrise Party of Japan. He ran for the House of Councilors in the July 11 2010 election, but was not elected. The Sunrise Party became part of the Japan Restoration Party, and Nariaki returned to the Diet in the 2012 general election. When Shintaro Ishihara's group left that party to form the Party for Future Generations he and his wife went too. He lost his seat again in the 2014 general election.

Political offices
Preceded by Sadakazu Tanigaki	Minister of Land，Infrastructure，Transport and Tourism; 2008	Succeeded by Kazuyoshi Kaneko
Preceded by Takeo Kawamura	Minister of Education, Culture, Sports, Science and Technology; 2004–2005	Succeeded by Kenji Kosaka
