= Miyagi 2nd district =

Japan House of Representatives constituency

Miyagi 2nd District
- 宮城県第2区
- Parliamentary constituency for the Japanese House of Representatives
- Numbered map of Miyagi Prefecture single-member districts
- Prefecture: Miyagi
- Proportional District: Tohoku
- Electorate: 452,387

Current constituency
- Created: 1994
- Seats: One
- Party: LDP
- Representative: Katsuyuki Watanabe

Miyagi 2nd district (Japanese: 宮城県第2区, Hepburn: Miyagi-ken Dainiku) is a single-member constituency of the House of Representatives, the lower house of the National Diet of Japan. It is located on the island of Honshu, in Miyagi Prefecture, and includes parts of the city of Sendai, the prefectural capital (the city is shared with District 2).

As of 2020, the district was home to 454,848 constituents.

== Area ==
Since the constituency was established in 1994, it has included the following area:

- Sendai
  - Miyagino-ku
  - Wakabayashi-ku
  - Izumi-ku

== Elected representatives ==
Representative	Party	Years	Notes
Masashi Nakano	LDP	1996 – 2000	
Sayuri Kamata	DPJ	2000 – 2004	Stepped down due to violations of the public election law
Kenya Akiba	LDP	2005 – 2009	
Yasunori Saito	DPJ	2009 – 2012	
Kenya Akiba	LDP	2012 – 2021	
Sayuri Kamata	CDP	2021 – 2026	
Katsuyuki Watanabe	LDP	2026 –	

== Election results ==
2026
Party	Candidate	Votes	%	±%
LDP	Katsuyuki Watanabe	101,364	41.4	▲8.7
Centrist Reform	Sayuri Kamata	73,695	30.1	▼23.1
Sanseitō	Masamune Wada (Won a seat in the PR Block	36,086	14.7	
DPP	Ririka Sato	23,237	9.5	
Ishin	Atsushi Hayasaka	10,394	4.2	▼9.9
Registered electors		452,387		
Turnout		246,776	54.96	▲4.93
LDP gain from Centrist Reform				

2024
Party	Candidate	Votes	%	±%
CDP	Sayuri Kamata	116,390	53.2	▲4.2
LDP	Kenya Akiba	71,633	32.7	▼16.0
Ishin	Atsushi Hayasaka	30,967	14.1	
Registered electors		453,658		
Turnout			50.03	▼3.59
CDP hold				

2021
Party	Candidate	Votes	%	±%
CDP	Sayuri Kamata	116,320	49.0	
LDP	Kenya Akiba (elected in Tohoku PR block)	115,749	48.7	
Anti-NHK	Hayashi Maria Yuki	5,521	2.3	
Turnout		244,190	53.6	
CDP gain from LDP				

2017
Party	Candidate	Votes	%	±%
LDP	Kenya Akiba (endorsed by Komeito and the Party for Japanese Kokoro)	111,559	50.3	
Independent	Sayuri Kamata	110,243	49.7	
Turnout		227,943	50.6	
LDP hold				

2014
Party	Candidate	Votes	%	±%
LDP	Kenya Akiba	91,289	45.5	
Ishin	Hiroki Hayashi	60,653	30.3	
JCP	Mari Ouchi	21,630	10.8	
Japanese Kokoro	Masumoto Teruaki	15,228	7.6	
Social Democratic	Takashi Kuwashima	11,725	5.9	
Turnout			53.6	
LDP hold				

2012
Party	Candidate	Votes	%	±%
LDP	Kenya Akiba (endorsed by Komeito)	76,595	33.5	
Restoration	Masahi Nakano	45,316	19.8	
Democratic	Konno Higashi (endorsed by the PNP)	35,085	15.3	
Tomorrow	Yasunori Saito (endorsed by New Party Daichi)	34,348	15.0	
Your	Fumihiro Kikuchi	23,138	10.1	
JCP	Kazue Fukushima	14,494	6.3	
Turnout			54.6	
LDP gain from Democratic				

2009
Party	Candidate	Votes	%	±%
Democratic	Yasunori Saito	158,041	58.9	
LDP	Masashi Nakano (incumbent)	98,517	36.7	
Independent	Yutaka Sato	9,912	3.7	
Happiness Realization	Kimito Abe	2,086	0.8	
Turnout			64.5	
Democratic gain from LDP				

2005
Party	Candidate	Votes	%	±%
LDP	Kenya Akiba	130,257	52.8	
Democratic	Yukiko Monma	98,645	40.0	
JCP	Daira Goto	17,906	7.3	
Turnout			61.3	
LDP hold				

2005 by-election
Party	Candidate	Votes	%	±%
LDP	Kenya Akiba	58,023	39.1	
Democratic	Yukiko Monma	52,381	35.3	
Independent	Fumihiro Kikuchi	22,702	15.3	
JCP	Daira Goto	8,358	5.6	
Social Democratic	Eiji Tayama	6,808	4.6	
Turnout				
LDP gain from Democratic				

2003
Party	Candidate	Votes	%	±%
Democratic	Sayuri Kamata (incumbent)	98,028	45.4	
LDP	Masashi Nakano (elected in Tohoku PR block)	94,621	43.8	
JCP	Daira Goto	11,311	5.2	
Social Democratic	Eiji Tayama	9,107	4.2	
Independent	Koichi Shibata	3,019	1.4	
Turnout			54.9	
Democratic hold				

2000
Party	Candidate	Votes	%	±%
Democratic	Sayuri Kamata	99,498	47.8	
LDP	Masashi Nakano	87,949	42.2	
JCP	Nobukatsu Tsuda	20,914	10.0	
Turnout				
Democratic gain from LDP				

1996
Party	Candidate	Votes	%	±%
LDP	Masashi Nakano	68,137	35.8	
New Frontier	Kunio Chiba (incumbent - previous district)	62,533	32.9	
Democratic	Yutaka Sato	27,328	14.4	
JCP	Daira Goto	18,157	9.5	
Social Democratic	Kenji Ishikawa	12,629	6.6	
Liberal League	Tatsuya Igarashi	1,490	0.8	
Turnout		195,098	52.9	
LDP win (new seat)				
