= Sonoda =

Sonoda (written: 園田, 薗田, 其田 or 苑田) is a Japanese surname. Notable people with the surname include:

- Hiroyuki Sonoda (園田 博之; 1942–2018), Japanese politician
- Isamu Sonoda (園田 勇; born 1946), Japanese judoka
- Jun Sonoda (薗田 淳; born 1989), Japanese footballer
- Kazuharu Sonoda (薗田 一治; 1956–1987), Japanese professional wrestler
- Keigo Sonoda (園田 啓悟; born 1990), Japanese badminton player
- Kenichi Sonoda (園田 健一; born 1962), Japanese manga artist and character designer
- Mitsuyoshi Sonoda (園田 光慶; 1940–1997), Japanese manga artist
- Nobuhiro Sonoda, Japanese luthier
- Pearl Mitsu Sonoda (1918–2015), American ichthyologist and biologist
- Ryuji Sonoda (園田 隆二; born 1973), Japanese judoka
- Shunsuke Sonoda (薗田 峻輔; born 1989), Japanese golfer
- Shuta Sonoda (其田 秀太; born 1969), Japanese footballer
- Sunao Sonoda (園田 直; 1913–1984), Japanese politician
- Takuya Sonoda (園田 拓也; born 1984), Japanese footballer
- Tenkoko Sonoda (園田 天光光; born 1919), Japanese politician
- Yasuhiro Sonoda (園田 康博; born 1967), Japanese politician
- Yoshiro Sonoda (園田 裕四郎; born 1932), Japanese long jumper
- Yuji Sonoda (苑田 右二; born 1973), Japanese rugby union player

== Fictional characters ==
- Chiyoko Sonoda (園田 智代子), a character from The Idolmaster Shiny Colors
- Umi Sonoda (園田 海未), a character from the multimedia franchise Love Live!
- Mari Sonoda (園田 真理), a character from the Kamen Rider Faiz
- Sarina Sonoda (園田 紗里奈), a character from the Kamen Rider Fourze
- Yū Sonoda (園田 優), a character from Sakura Trick
- Mitsuki Sonoda (園田 美月), a character from Sakura Trick
- Taisei Sonoda (園田 大勢), a character from Komi Can't Communicate
