= Sayuri Kamata =

Japanese lawyer & politician (born 1980)

- 鎌田 さゆり
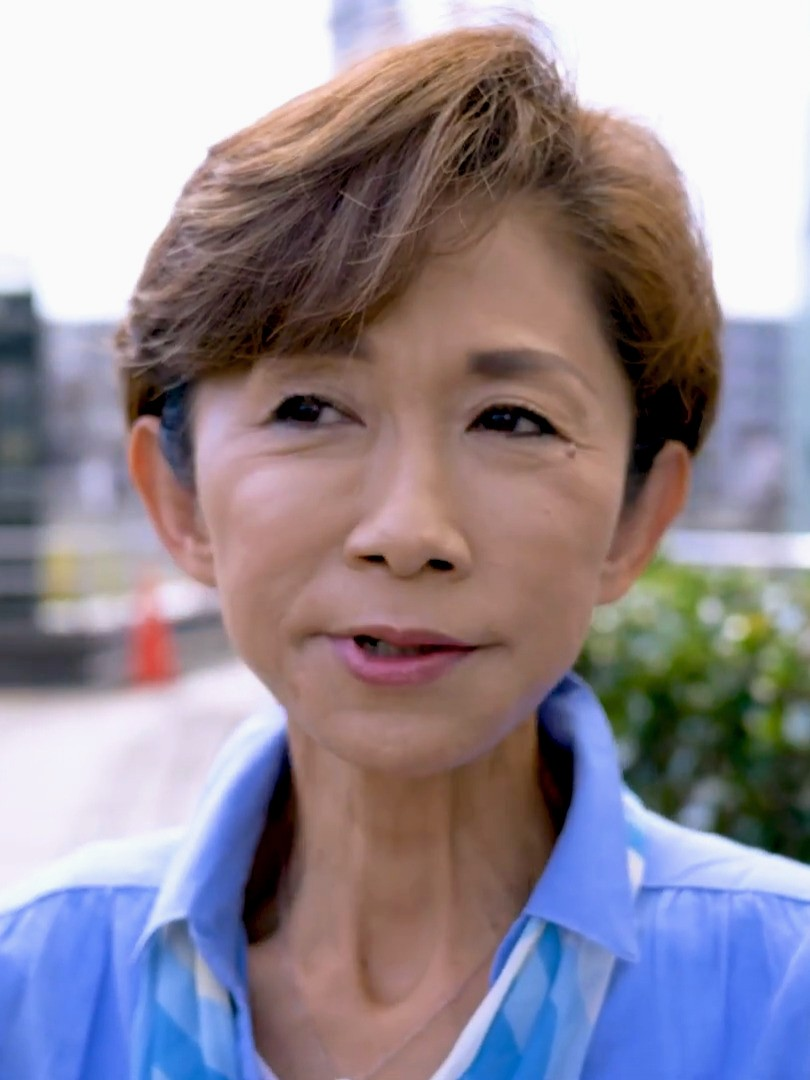
- Sayuri Kamata, 2021

Member of the House of Representatives
- In office November 3, 2021 – January 23, 2026
- Preceded by: Kenya Akiba
- Succeeded by: Katsuyuki Watanabe
- Constituency: Miyagi 2nd
- In office June 25, 2000 – December 24, 2004
- Preceded by: Masashi Nakano
- Succeeded by: Kenya Akiba
- Constituency: Miyagi 2nd

Member of the Miyagi Prefectural Assembly
- In office October 25, 2015 – October 22, 2017
- Constituency: Izumi Ward

Member of the Sendai City Council
- In office April 9, 1995 – 1997
- Constituency: Izumi Ward

Personal details
- Born: January 8, 1965 (age 61) Sendai, Miyagi, Japan
- Party: CRA (since 2026)
- Other political affiliations: LDP (1995–2000); DPJ (2000–2005; 2012–2016); Independent (2005–2012); DP (2016–2018); CDP (2018–2026)
- Education: Bachelor of Economics, Tohoku Gakuin University
- Occupation: Politician
- Website: Official Website

Sayuri Kamata (鎌田 さゆり) (born January 8, 1965) is a Japanese politician. She is a member of the House of Representatives (four terms) and the acting representative of the Constitutional Democratic Party of Japan (CDP) of Japan's Miyagi Prefectural Chapter. She also served as a member of the Miyagi Prefectural Assembly (one term) and a member of the Sendai City Assembly (one term).

== Early life ==
She was born in Sendai City. Her father served as secretary-general of the Miyagi Prefectural Liberal Democratic Party (LDP) branch and passed away in 2009. Her mother was in charge of accounting for the Miyagi Prefectural LDP branch. After graduating from Miyagi Gakuin High School, she graduated from the Faculty of Economics at Tohoku Gakuin University.

== Career ==
In 1995, Kamata was elected to the Sendai City Council, and served as a member of the LDP until 1997.

In 1998, with the endorsement of the LDP Sendai City Federation, she ran in the 18th regular election for the House of Councillors in the Miyagi Prefecture electoral district (2 seats), and advocated policies similar to those of the New Party Heiwa and the Komeito Party, such as the issuance of time-limited regional promotion coupons. However, as she was the third LDP candidate in the same district, she was defeated.

Kamata joined the Democratic Party and ran in the 42nd general election for the House of Representatives in Miyagi 2nd district, where she was elected and became a member of the House of Representatives. During her term in office, she participated in a signature campaign for Diet members opposing the construction of Shizuoka Airport. In November 2003, she ran in the 43rd general election for the House of Representatives in Miyagi 2nd district, where she was re-elected.

The following December, nine people, including the chairman of the Miyagi Regional Council of the All Japan Electrical, Electronics and Information-related Industries Workers' Union (Denki Rengo), were arrested and indicted on charges of violating the Public Offices Election Act for outsourcing a telephone campaign encouraging voters to vote for Kamata and Konno Higashi (Miyagi 1st District) to a marketing company. The case went all the way to the Supreme Court, but on December 21, 2004, the appeal was dismissed and the guilty verdict was upheld. Following this, on December 24, Kamata submitted her resignation from the House of Representatives and resigned voluntarily.

On March 22, 2005, Kamata was banned from running in Miyagi 2nd District for five years. Following the ruling, she left the Democratic Party and ran as an independent in the July 2005 Sendai mayoral election. The Miyagi Prefectural Chapter of the Democratic Party decided to allow its members to vote freely, but the Democratic Party's then-president Yukio Hatoyama and several Diet members who were Kamata's contemporaries came to support her. As a result of the voting held on the 31st of the same month, newcomer and former Ministry of Economy, Trade and Industry employee Katsuhiko Umehara was elected, and Kamata lost by a margin of 59,116 votes.

In 2006, Kamata founded the "Mori no Miyako Political School" and the "Sendai Speech Academy." In 2012, she rejoined the Democratic Party. In December of the same year, she ran as a Democratic Party candidate in the 46th general election for the House of Representatives in the Miyagi 6th district, but lost to Itsunori Onodera and was not re-elected through proportional representation. In December 2014, she also ran as a Democratic Party candidate in the Miyagi 6th district in the 47th general election for the House of Representatives, but was again defeated. In October 2015, she ran as an independent candidate in the 2015 Miyagi Prefectural Assembly Election Miyagi Prefectural Assembly election in the Izumi Ward constituency, endorsed by the Democratic Party, and won first place.

On October 22, 2017, Kamata ran as an independent in the Miyagi 2nd District in the 48th general election for the House of Representatives. She was automatically removed from office on October 10, the day the election was announced. She initially applied for the Party of Hope's endorsement, but expressed her desire to repeal the national security legislation. She announced her candidacy as an independent. Caught between the Party of Hope and the Constitutional Democratic Party, Kamata stated, "I have liberal beliefs. I'm not a hawk," but also stated, "I want to make a choice that will win." With the Japanese Communist Party consolidating its candidate on Kamata, she faced a close race against incumbent LDP candidate Kenya Akiba, but lost by 1,316 votes. On November 24, she announced her intention to leave the Democratic Party and join the Constitutional Democratic Party by the end of the year. On December 16, she attended a town meeting of the Constitutional Democratic Party of Japan held in Sendai City and expressed her intention to join the party on New Year's Day. On the same day, after the Miyagi Prefectural DPJ convention, she submitted her resignation from the party. On December 28, the Miyagi Prefectural DPJ accepted her resignation.

On January 1, 2018, Kamata joined the former Constitutional Democratic Party of Japan and became the Secretary-General of the Miyagi Prefectural Chapter. On the 10th of the same month, she was appointed as the General Branch Chief of the Miyagi 2nd District at the party's Standing Executive Committee Meeting.

On September 29, 2020, the Constitutional Democratic Party of Japan, a new party formed by the merger of the former Constitutional Democratic Party of Japan and the former Democratic Party for the People, held a standing executive committee meeting and selected Kamata as its official candidate for the Miyagi 2nd District in the upcoming House of Representatives election.

In the 49th general election for the House of Representatives on October 31, 2021, she again faced a close race with Akiba, but narrowly won by 571 votes, marking her return to national politics for the first time in 16 years and 10 months (Akiba was elected through proportional representation). In the Constitutional Democratic Party leadership election following the resignation of party leader Yukio Edano, she was one of Ogawa's supporters. The leadership election was held on November 30. Kamata voted for Ogawa in the first round of voting, and for Izumi Kenta in the runoff.

On May 15, 2023, Constitutional Democratic Party leader Kenta Izumi appeared on BS Fuji 's news program Prime News and stated that the party would not cooperate with the Japanese Communist Party or the Japan Innovation Party in the upcoming House of Representatives election. The Communist Party rebelled. On May 22, the party announced its intention to actively field candidates in single-seat constituencies, even if it was in competition with the Constitutional Democratic Party. On June 16, Kamata and other members of the Constitutional Democratic Party launched the "Group of Volunteers to Achieve a Change of Government by Unifying Opposition Candidates" and held a press conference, calling on Izumi to correct course. The group's founders were Kamata, Tomoko Abe, Junya Ogawa, and Ichirō Ozawa; along with 20 others. Fifty-three members of the House of Representatives, more than half of the party's members, agreed, and the anti-Izumi movement came to the surface.

In the leadership election held on September 23, 2024, Kamata was one of Yoshihiko Noda's supporters.

On October 15 of the same year, the 50th general election for the House of Representatives was announced, with three candidates running: Kamata, Akiba, and the incumbent Japan Restoration Party member, Atsushi Hayasaka. On October 17, the Nihon Keizai Shimbun reported that "Kamata is fighting a solid fight. Akiba has secured 60% of the LDP's support base." The LDP faced headwinds due to the slush fund scandal, the Unification Church scandal, and the October 23 revelation of the payment of 20 million yen to an unofficial candidate. The general election was held on October 27. Immediately after the voting deadline at 8:00 PM, Miyagi Television Broadcasting reported that Kamata had been declared the winner, and she was elected to her fourth term. Akiba, who had a low rate of close losses, was unable to regain his seat through proportional representation and lost his seat. The Japan Restoration Party was unable to win a seat in the proportional representation block in the Tohoku region. As a result, Hayasaka also lost his seat.

== Political positions ==
=== Constitution ===
Regarding constitutional reform, in a 2014 survey she answered "against", and in a 2017 survey she answered "somewhat against."

=== Diplomacy/Security ===
She does not approve of the Abe Cabinet 's cabinet decision to allow the exercise of the right of collective self-defense. She is opposed to the security legislation that allows the exercise of the right of collective self-defense. The three non-nuclear principles should be adhered to. She is somewhat opposed to the idea that Japan's defense capabilities should be strengthened. She is opposed to preemptive attacks on other countries. She does not approve of the Abe Cabinet's approach to the North Korea issue. Regarding the idea that pressure should be prioritized over dialogue with North Korea, she answered "neither agree nor disagree" in a 2014 survey, and "disagree" in a 2017 survey.

=== Political system ===
She supports lowering the voting age.

=== Historical awareness ===
She opposes the prime minister's visits to Yasukuni Shrine.

=== Tax system ===
She is somewhat opposed to raising the consumption tax rate above 10 percent in the long term. She is somewhat opposed to lowering the corporate tax rate. She is somewhat in favor of increasing taxes on the wealthy who have high incomes and assets.

=== Economy ===
She is somewhat negative about the economic policies of the Abe Cabinet (Abenomics). If anything, they prioritize reducing disparities.

=== Energy policy ===
She is opposed to the restart of nuclear power plants that have passed inspection by the Nuclear Regulation Authority. Regarding the abolition of nuclear power plants (zero nuclear power plants), in a 2014 survey she answered "somewhat in favor", and in a 2017 surveys he answered "in favor".

=== Society ===
She opposes restricting privacy and individual rights in the name of maintaining public order. She does not approve of the passage of the Act on the Protection of Specially Designated Secrets. The establishment of the crime of conspiracy is not appreciated. In 2000, 50 female Diet members from across the political spectrum, including Kamata, submitted a petition to then Prime Minister Yoshiro Mori calling for the optional system of separate surnames for married couples. The petition stated, "There is a growing demand for the optional system of separate surnames for married couples, especially among the younger generation. We hope that the government will make efforts to introduce the optional system of separate surnames for married couples, including by raising public opinion." In a 2014 survey, respondents answered "I can't decide", and in a 2017 survey, she answered "I support it." There is a wide variety of family structures, including single-parent families and DINKs. In favor of legalizing same-sex marriage. She supports free education from kindergarten and nursery school to university. She is somewhat in favor of regulating hate speech through legislation. Regarding the acceptance of foreign workers, in a 2014 survey he answered "neither agree nor disagree", and in a 2017 survey she answered "in favor". She is opposed to legalizing casinos. She supports immigrants, legal and illegal.

== Criticism ==
During the 49th general election for the House of Representatives, Kamata campaigned with a goat named "Sendai Mary." However, on the evening of November 3, after her election victory was confirmed, she tweeted, "It is difficult to responsibly care for and raise the goat until the end, so I will have a foster parent in Kurikoma raise it." She announced her intention to place the goat in a foster home. Some Twitter users criticized his decision, saying things like, "Using the goat for the election campaign" and "Animals have lives, too." In response, Kamata replied, "I appreciate everyone's opinions and advice. As you pointed out, I cannot deny that I was overly optimistic, and I regret that. I will continue to live with her." She then changed her mind and decided to keep the goat at his home in Sendai. However, Kamata stated that he had always intended to place the goat in a foster home if he was elected. In response to criticism that he was using the goat for the election campaign, he said, "There were also comments saying, 'I will get rid of it,' or 'I will use it for the election and then throw it away.' I am sad that it was misunderstood."

Kamata has been accused of being harsh with people and overly-demanding. This resulted in nine of her secretaries resigning within three years, from 2021 to 2024.

== Elections ==
House of Representatives (Japan)
Preceded by Kenya Akiba	Member of the House of Representatives for Miyagi 2nd district (single-member); 2021–present	Incumbent
Preceded by Masashi Nakano	Member of the House of Representatives for Miyagi 2nd district (proportional); 2000–2004	Succeeded by Kenya Akiba
Political offices
Preceded by Unknown	Miyagi Prefectural Assembly Member; 2015–2017	Succeeded by Unknown
Political offices
Preceded by Unknown	Sendai City Council; Izumi Ward; 1995–1997	Succeeded by Unknown
