= Masashi Nakano =

Japanese politician

- 中野 正志
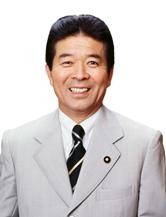
- Official portrait, 2007

Leader of the Party for Japanese Kokoro
- In office 30 September 2017 – 1 November 2018
- Preceded by: Kyoko Nakayama
- Succeeded by: Position abolished

Member of the House of Councillors
- In office 21 July 2013 – 21 July 2019
- Constituency: National PR

Member of the House of Representatives
- In office 9 November 2003 – 30 August 2009
- Constituency: Tōhoku PR
- In office 20 October 1996 – 25 June 2000
- Preceded by: Constituency established
- Succeeded by: Sayuri Kamata
- Constituency: Miyagi 2nd

Member of the Miyagi Prefectural Assembly
- In office 1991–1995
- Constituency: Sendai City Miyagino Ward
- In office 1983 – 23 July 1989
- Constituency: Sendai City Miyagino Ward

Personal details
- Born: 29 February 1948 (age 78) Shiogama, Miyagi, Japan
- Party: Liberal Democratic (1983–2012; 2018–present)
- Other political affiliations: Sunrise (2012); JRP (2012–2014); PJK (2014–2018)

Masashi Nakano (中野 正志, Nakano Masashi; born 29 February 1948) is a Japanese politician and former Secretary-General of the Party for Japanese Kokoro.

A native of Shiogama, Miyagi Prefecture and graduate of Tohoku Gakuin University, he was first elected to the assembly of Miyagi Prefecture in 1983. During his second term as an assemblyman, he contested the national House of Councillors election in 1989 as an independent but was defeated. He was elected to the House of Representatives in the national Diet as a member of the Liberal Democratic Party in the 1996 general election, representing Miyagi District No.2. In the 2000 general election he was defeated in his district by Sayuri Kamata. In the 2003 general election he was again defeated by Kamata in Miyagi No.2, but was elected to return to the House of Representatives as a member for the Tōhoku proportional block. He retained his seat in the 2005 general election and was appointed Senior Vice-Minister of Economy, Trade and Industry in Shinzo Abe's first ministry in 2007. He contested his seat in the 2009 general election as a Liberal Democratic Party candidate and with an endorsement from the Komeito Party, but lost his seat as the LDP lost a general election for the first time since the party was formed in 1955.

Nakano contested the July 2010 House of Councillors election but was unable to win a seat in the national proportional representation block. In 2012 he was appointed as Miyagi No.2 district leader of the Sunrise Party and resigned from the LDP. Following the Sunrise Party's merger with the Japan Restoration Party in November 2012, Nakano was elected to the national proportional representation block as a JRP member in the July 2013 House of Councillors election. With JRP's split in August 2014 he joined the newly formed Party for Future Generations. He was appointed as the party's secretary-general in November 2015. In December 2015 the party changed its name to the Party for Japanese Kokoro.

In November 2018, the Party for Japanese Kokoro dissolved, and Nakano returned to the LDP.
