= Japanese Culture Channel Sakura =

Japanese right-wing television channel

Coordinates: 35°39′41″N 139°42′25″E

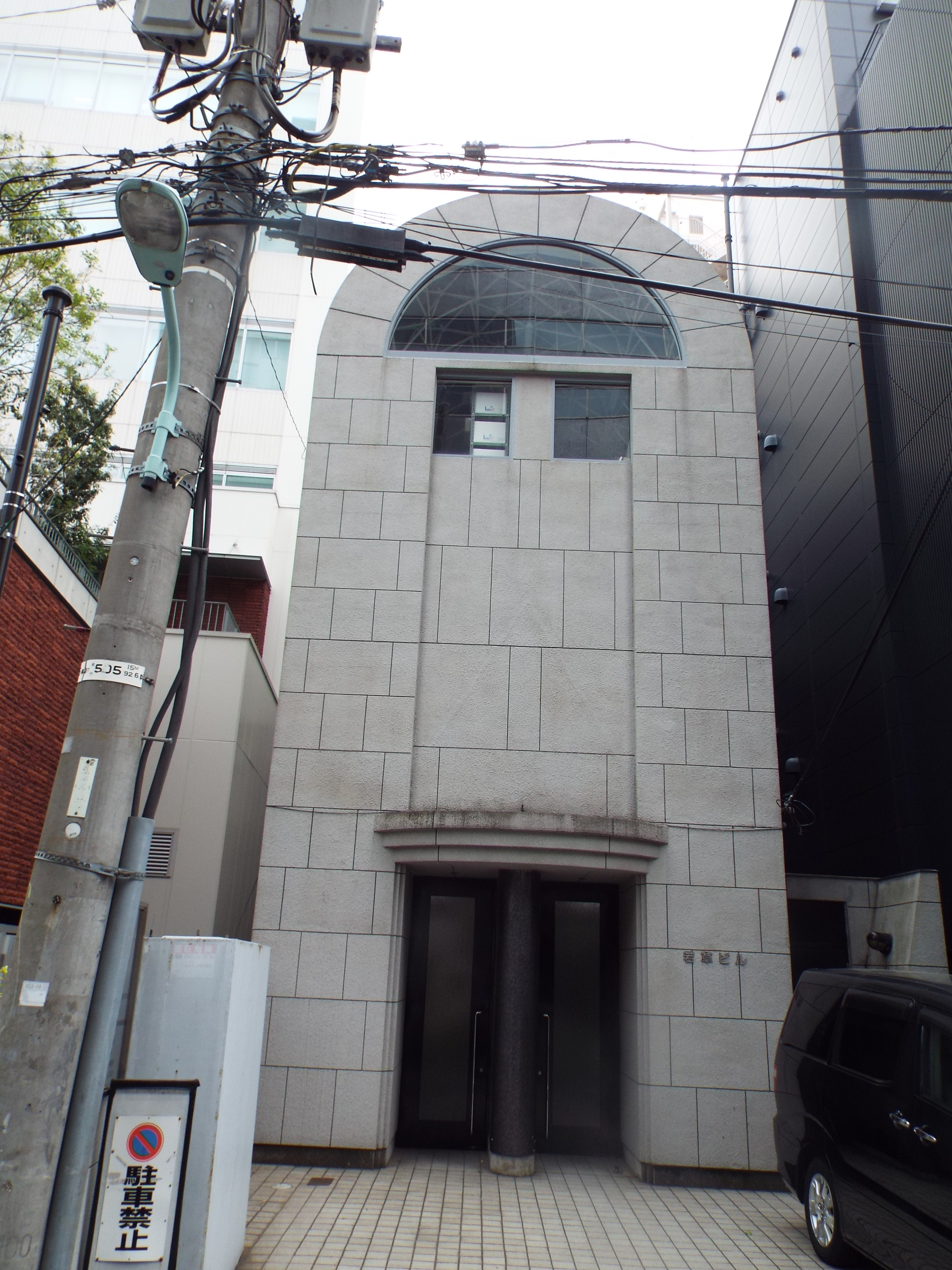
Head office

Japanese Culture Channel Sakura (日本文化チャンネル桜, Nihon Bunka Channeru Sakura), also known as simply Channel Sakura, is a Japanese right-wing television channel and video-sharing website founded in 2004. It is known for its support for conservatism and Japanese nationalism, with its main spokesperson being Satoru Mizushima.

The channel broadcasts Japanese history, culture, politics, economics, etc. from a right-wing point of view and has hosted Shinzō Abe, the PM of Japan and President of Liberal Democratic Party, many ministers, members of the Liberal Democratic Party as well as the Democratic Party of Japan, local government delegates, well-known intellectuals and people in various fields. Discussion topics often include positive portrayal of Japanese imperialism, war crime denial, anti-Korean and anti-Chinese sentiments as well as attempting to present a "pure" Japanese cultural image. In addition, the channel is associated with nationalist and right-wing Japanese political groups, such as Nippon Kaigi, Ganbare Nippon and the Sunrise Party of Japan ("Tachiagare Nippon").

Channel Sakura also participates in mass political rallies, which have garnered as many as several thousand participants, carrying Japanese Hinomaru flags. For example, these groups demonstrated against China during the 2011 Diaoyutai/Senkaku dispute, against Fuji TV's showing of Korean dramas and other content (during which time they called Fuji TV the "traitor network"), and against Naoto Kan's administration in the aftermath of the 2011 Tohoku earthquake as well as the handling of the 2011 Senkaku Dispute.

== Criticism ==
Channel Sakura was criticized for showing the 2007 film The Truth About Nanjing, which portrays the Nanjing Massacre as a hoax.

Channel Sakura and President Mizushima himself have denied being a right-wing historical revisionists, and held a press conference with the Asahi Shimbun held at the Foreign Correspondents' Club of Japan in February 2015. He said he affirmed what was described as "Conservative." Hideaki Kase, who attended the press conference with Mizushima, told a foreign reporter, "I'm totally ignorant about Japan, and I'm talking about sloppy things." He criticized the report as "only reporting with the same ideological color as the Asahi Shimbun," and criticized Japan's conservatives in the form of right-wing historical revisionists. Saying "I even get angry," "I want you to tell me the truth," and "I'm very sad."

== See also ==
- Neoconservatism in Japan
- Ethnic issues in Japan
- Nihonjinron
- Tsargrad TV
- România TV
- Balkan Info
