= Hiranuma =

Japanese surname

Hiranuma is a Japanese surname. Notable people with the surname include:

- Kiichirō Hiranuma (1867–1952), 35th Prime Minister of Japan
- Takeo Hiranuma (born 1939), Japanese politician
