= Ganbare Nippon =

Japanese political group

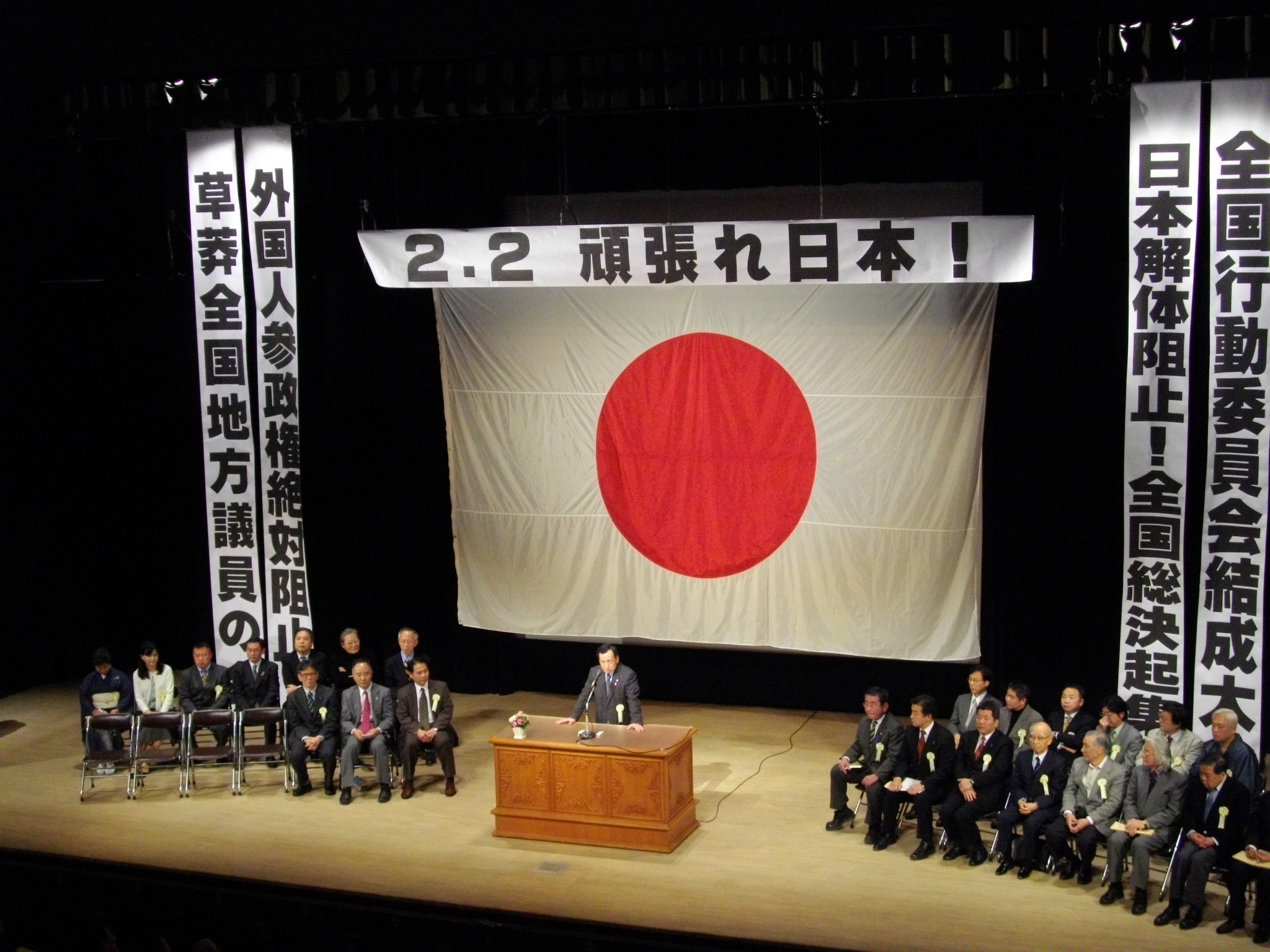
Ganbare Nippon's Inaugural Meeting, February 2, 2010

Ganbare Nippon! Zenkoku Kōdō Iinkai (頑張れ日本！全国行動委員会) (literally: Do Your Best, Japan! National Action Committee), usually abbreviated to Ganbare Nippon (頑張れ日本), is a Japanese conservative nationalist group founded on February 2, 2010. One of the founders was right-wing filmmaker and playwright Satoru Mizushima.

The inaugural chair was former Chief of Staff of Air Self-Defense Force Toshio Tamogami. As of March 2015 he was no longer the head of the group.

== Activities ==
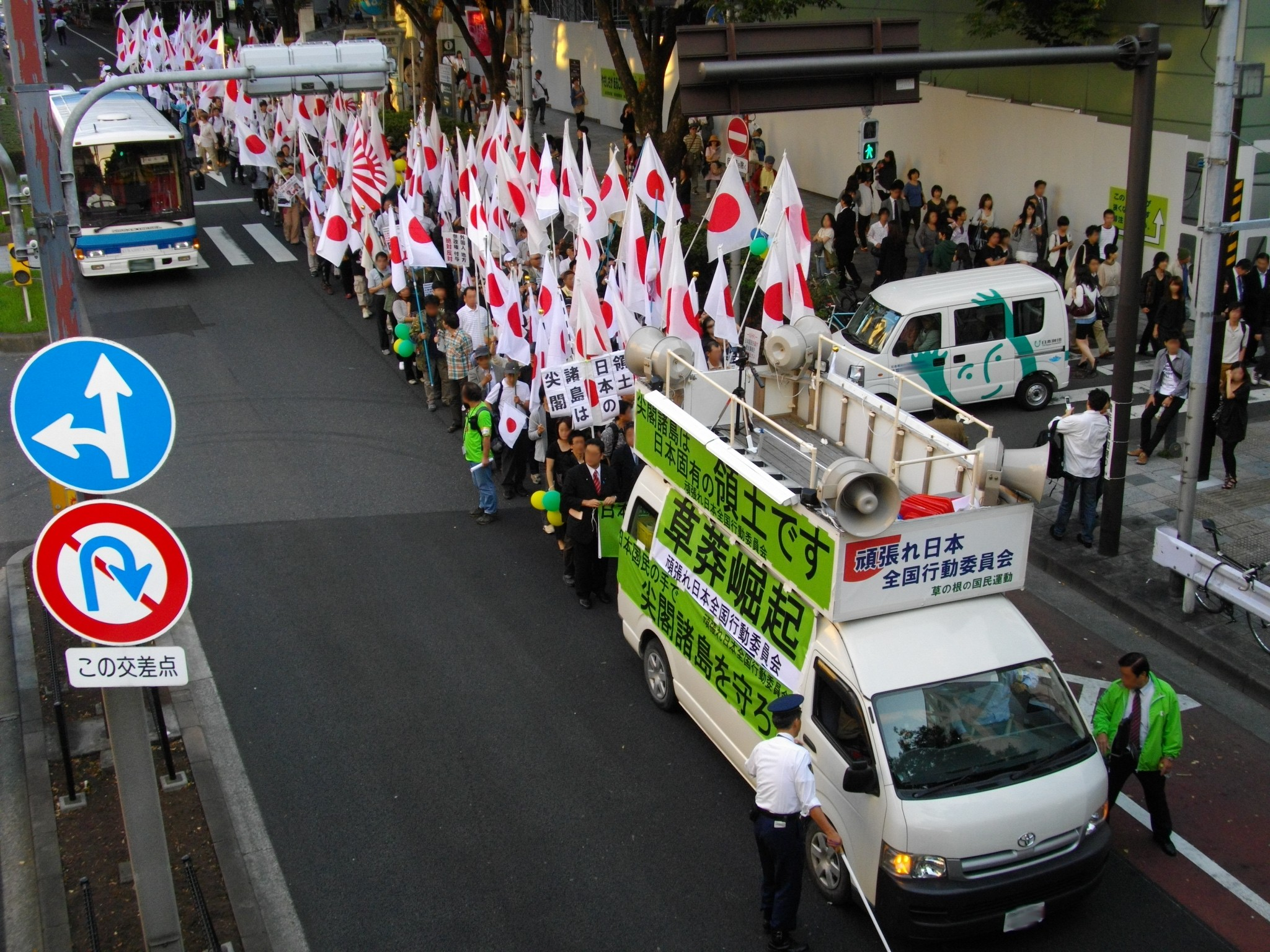
Anti-Chinese government protest after the 2010 Senkaku boat collision incident

Ganbare Nippon has participated in a number of demonstrations and actions concerning right-wing issues.

=== Protests against Democratic Party of Japan ===
In January 2011 the group organized a protest against the ruling Democratic Party of Japan. Around 1,900 people joined the event calling on the DPJ to step down. Several lawmakers attended, including Takeo Hiranuma, head of the Sunrise Party of Japan.

=== Protest against Yomiuri Shimbun ===
In January 2012 it protested against the conservative Yomiuri Shimbun newspaper. The Yomiuri had editorialized in favor of the Imperial succession being opened to female members of the Imperial family.

=== Senkaku Islands flag-raising ===
Following a visit to the disputed Senkaku Islands by a group of 14 Hong Kong pro-China activists, five of whom went ashore, who were deported by Japan without being charged, Ganbare Nippon arranged an unauthorized visit to the Senkakus.

About 150 people on about 20 boats left Ishigaki Island in Okinawa Prefecture and sailed to the island to hold a service for Japanese who died near the Senkakus during World War Two.

After the service ten people swam ashore, five of those who swam ashore were from the organizing group and five were local assembly members from Tokyo, Hyōgo Prefecture, Suginami and Arakawa Wards in Tokyo, and Toride in Ibaraki Prefecture. They raised several Hinomaru flags after landing. Tamogami said: "With the Chinese activists just having landed, this is a way of telling them not to mess around. We hope to convey to both China and to Japanese people, through the media, or whatever means, that the Senkakus are our territory.” The flotilla arrival at the archipelago set off anti-Japanese rallies in more than 25 Chinese cities, Chinese protestors overturned Japanese-branded cars and smashed windows of Japanese-themed businesses.

=== Protest against Chinese protests ===
Japan formally nationalized the three Senkaku islands that had been held in the ownership of Kunioki Kurihara. Substantial Chinese protests followed, and on 18 September 2012, Ganbare Nippon organized an anti-Chinese counterprotest in Tokyo which was attended by about 50 people.

=== Protest against homosexuality ===
On 10 March 2015, Ganbare Nippon organized a protest in Shibuya against homosexuality, with slogans such as "Normal love is between a man and a woman" and "LGBT ruins society".

=== Participating in elections ===
Members of Ganbare Nippon ran in the 2021 Japanese general election under the banner of Kunimori Conservative Party (新党くにもり), fielding two candidates. In the Wakayama 3rd district, Nana Honma received 19,034 votes (12.83%), while in the Chiba 10th district Mari Azusa received 10,272 votes (5.8%).
