= Kenya Akiba =

Japanese politician (born 1962)

- 秋葉 賢也
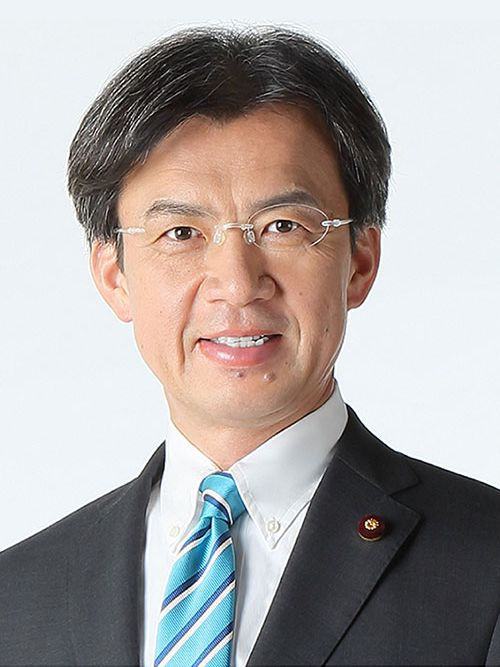
- Official portrait, 2019

Minister for Reconstruction
- In office 10 August 2022 – 27 December 2022
- Prime Minister: Fumio Kishida
- Preceded by: Kosaburo Nishime
- Succeeded by: Hiromichi Watanabe

Member of the House of Representatives
- Incumbent
- Assumed office 9 February 2026
- Constituency: Tohoku PR
- In office 25 April 2005 – 9 October 2024
- Preceded by: Sayuri Kamata
- Succeeded by: Multi-member district
- Constituency: Miyagi 2nd (2005–2009); Tohoku PR (2009–2012); Miyagi 2nd (2012–2021); Tohoku PR (2021–2024)

Member of the Miyagi Prefectural Assembly
- In office 1995–2005
- Constituency: Sendai City Izumi Ward

Personal details
- Born: 3 July 1962 (age 64) Miyagi, Japan
- Party: Liberal Democratic
- Education: Chuo University; Tohoku University

Kenya Akiba (秋葉 賢也, Akiba Ken'ya; born 3 July 1962) is a Japanese politician of the Liberal Democratic Party, a member of the House of Representatives in the Diet (national legislature). A native of Miyagi Prefecture, he attended Chuo University as an undergraduate and received his master's degree from Tohoku University. He was elected to the first of his three terms in the assembly of Miyagi Prefecture in 1995 and then to the House of Representatives for the first time in 2005.
