= Hiroyuki Sonoda =

Japanese politician

- 園田 博之
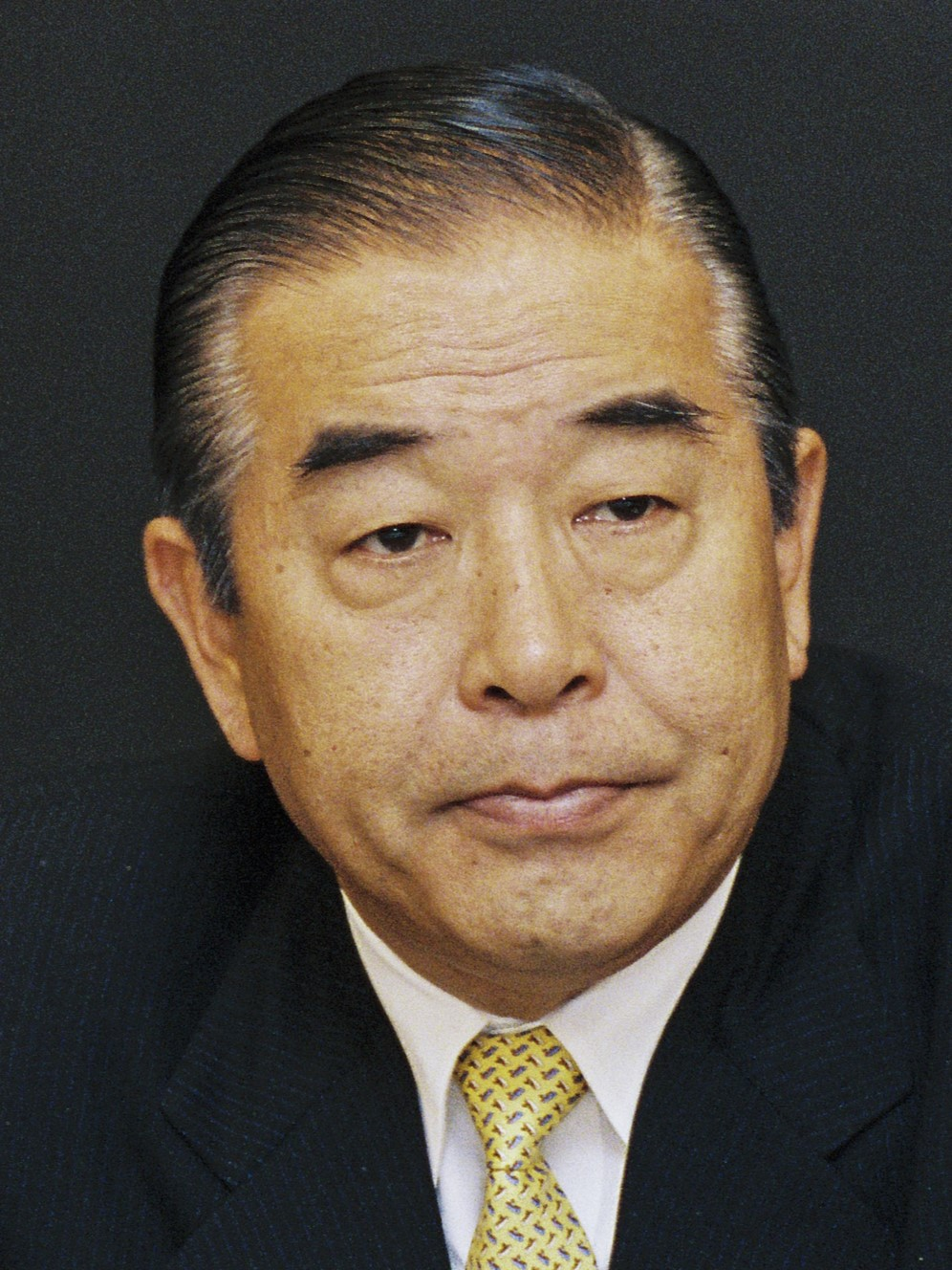
- Sonoda in 2004

Deputy Chief Cabinet Secretary (Political affairs)
- In office 30 June 1994 – 11 January 1996
- Prime Minister: Tomiichi Murayama
- Preceded by: Naoto Kitamura
- Succeeded by: Kazō Watanabe

Member of the House of Representatives
- In office 8 July 1986 – 11 November 2018
- Preceded by: Sunao Sonoda
- Succeeded by: Masahisa Miyazaki
- Constituency: Kumamoto 2nd (1986–1996); Kumamoto 4th (1996–2017); Kyushu PR (2017–2018)

Personal details
- Born: 19 February 1942 Kawaura, Kumamoto, Japan
- Died: 11 November 2018 (aged 76) Tokyo, Japan
- Party: Liberal Democratic
- Other political affiliations: NPS (1993–1994); Sunrise (2010–2012); JRP (2012–2014); PJK (2014–2015)
- Parent(s): Sunao Sonoda (father); Tenkoko Sonoda (stepmother)
- Education: Nihon University

Hiroyuki Sonoda (園田 博之, Sonoda Hiroyuki; 19 February 1942 – 11 November 2018) was a Japanese politician who served in the Diet (national legislature) as a member of the House of Representatives for Kumamoto 4th district; following the 2017 general election when Kumamoto lost one seat due to reapportionment, he moved to the Kyūshū proportional representation block. He was a member of the Liberal Democratic Party (LDP), previous party affiliations have been independent→LDP→New Party Sakigake→Independent→LDP→Sunrise Party of Japan→Sunrise Party→Japan Restoration Party→Party for Future Generations→Sunrise Party→Party for Future Generations→LDP.

== Career ==
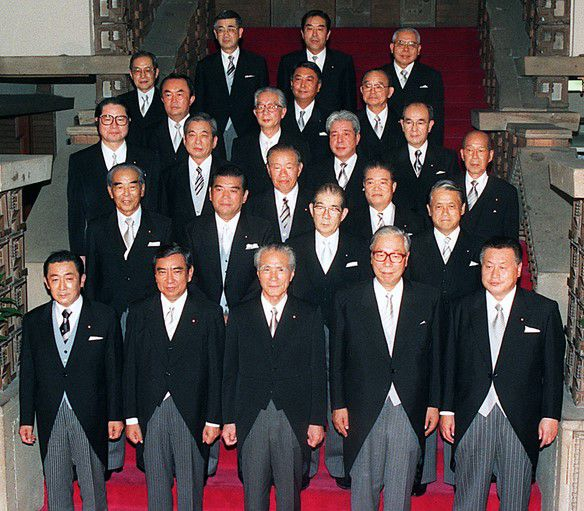
Sonoda with members of Murayama Reshuffled Cabinet (at the Prime Minister's Official Residence on August 8, 1995)

A native of Amakusa District, Kumamoto and graduate of Nihon University, Sonoda was elected for the first time in 1986, when he ran for his father's seat in Kumamoto Prefecture's 2nd district, a five-member district at the time. His father, the Foreign Minister Sunao Sonoda, died in 1984.

Hiroyuki Sonoda joined the Sunrise Party of Japan on April 10, 2010. The Sunrise Party merged with the Japan Restoration Party in 2012. In 2014 the former Sunrise Party members including Sonoda split away to form the Party for Future Generations.

Hiroyuki Sonoda was affiliated to the openly revisionist lobby Nippon Kaigi, and his late step-mother Tenkoko Sonoda (the second wife and the widow of his father) was a member of its representative committee.

== Death ==
Sonoda died of pneumonia on November 11, 2018.
