= Tohoku International School =

Coeducational international school in Izumi-ku, Sendai, Japan

Coordinates: 38°18′39.2″N 140°47′57.2″E

- 東北インターナショナルスクール

Location
- 7-101-1 Yakata, Izumi-ku, Sendai 981-3214; Japan

Information
- Type: Private/Co-educational
- Motto: Together Igniting Success
- Established: 1950
- Principal: Hiroko Yoshida
- Grades: K-12
- Language: English
- Colors: Blue and Orange
- Mascot: Eagle
- Accreditation: WASC
- Affiliation: International Bachelor's Program
- Website: http://www.tisweb.net/

Tohoku International School (TIS) is a coeducational international school located in Izumi-ku, Sendai, Japan. There are about 100 students from kindergarten (ages 4–5) to grade 12. TIS is accredited by the Western Association of Schools and Colleges (WASC).

== History ==
The school was founded in 1950 as a school for the children of Christian missionary families. It was originally known as Sendai American School, though it changed its name to Sendai Christian Academy and then back to Sendai American School before finally renaming itself Tohoku International School in 1997. It is currently now applying to be part of the International Baccalaureate and appears to have a musical theater programme.

There are currently 95 students enrolled at Tohoku International School: 10 pre-school pupils, 47 primary school pupils, 24 secondary school pupils, and 14 pupils of unknown age.

The school is known for its musicals, including Hairspray Jr., Aladdin Jr., and the upcoming Into the Woods Jr.
