= Shojiro Hiranuma =

Japanese politician (born 1979)

- 平沼 正二郎
- Official portrait, 2026

Member of the House of Representatives
- Incumbent
- Assumed office 3 November 2021
- Preceded by: Toshiko Abe
- Constituency: Okayama 3rd (2021–2024); Chūgoku PR (2024–present)

Personal details
- Born: 11 November 1979 (age 46) Okayama, Japan
- Party: Liberal Democratic
- Parent: Takeo Hiranuma (father)
- Education: Gakushuin University

Shojiro Hiranuma (平沼正二郎, Hiranuma Shojiro; born 11 November 1979) is a Japanese politician serving as a member of the House of Representatives since 2021. He is the son of Takeo Hiranuma.

Hiranuma was appointed director of the LDP Youth Division in October 2025.
