= Kyoko Nakayama =

Japanese politician (born 1940)

- 中山 恭子
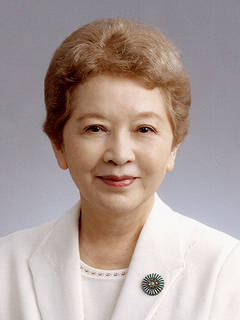
- Official portrait, 2008

Leader of the Party for Japanese Kokoro
- In office 1 October 2015 – 22 September 2017
- Preceded by: Shintarō Ishihara
- Succeeded by: Masashi Nakano

Minister for the Abduction Issue
- In office 2 August 2008 – 24 September 2008
- Prime Minister: Yasuo Fukuda
- Preceded by: Nobutaka Machimura
- Succeeded by: Takeo Kawamura

Member of the House of Councillors
- In office 29 July 2007 – 28 July 2019
- Constituency: National PR

Personal details
- Born: 26 January 1940 (age 86) Tokyo, Japan
- Party: Kibō no Tō (2017–2021)
- Other political affiliations: LDP (2007–2010); Sunrise (2010–2012); JRP (2012–2014); PJK (2014–2017)
- Spouse: Nariaki Nakayama
- Education: University of Tokyo

Kyoko Nakayama (中山 恭子, Nakayama Kyōko; born 26 January 1940) is a Japanese politician and a former leader of the Party for Japanese Kokoro. In the past she has been a member of the Liberal Democratic Party (LDP), Sunrise Party of Japan and Japan Restoration Party and is serving her second term as a member of the House of Councillors (Upper House) in the Diet (national legislature). She was Special Advisor to the Prime Minister (naikaku sōri-daijin hosakan) for the North Korean abduction issue under Junichiro Koizumi, beginning in 2002. She left the post in 2004 but was reappointed by Shinzō Abe in 2006. She was appointed by Yasuo Fukuda as State Minister in charge of the Population and Gender Equality Issues on August 1, 2008.

== Career ==
A graduate of the University of Tokyo (with a major in French literature), she worked at the Ministry of Finance from 1966 until 1999, when she was appointed as ambassador of Japan to Uzbekistan and Tajikistan. She was elected to the House of Councillors for the first time in 2007, and again in 2013. During her campaign, she pledged to resolve the abduction issue. Her husband, Nariaki Nakayama, is a former transport minister and was also a diet member.

She and her husband left the LDP and joined the Sunrise Party of Japan on June 21, 2010. Along with other members of that party she moved to Shintaro Ishihara's short lived Sunrise Party, and with the merger of that party with the Japan Restoration Party she became a member of that party. When Shintaro Ishihara's group left that party to form the Party for Future Generations she and her husband went too. Her husband lost his seat at the 2014 general election, but she remains in the diet. In October 2015 she became leader of the Party for Future Generations and in December of that year led the party in changing its name to the Party for Japanese Kokoro.
