= Teša Tešanović =

Serbian journalist

- Теша Тешановић
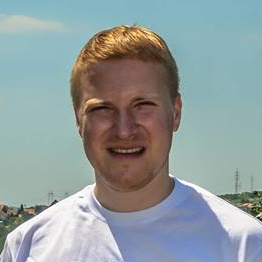
- Born: 17 May 1988 (age 37); Vršac, SR Serbia, SFR Yugoslavia
- Occupations: Journalist, talk show host
- Known for: Being the founder of Balkan Info

Teša Tešanović (Serbian Cyrillic: Теша Тешановић; born 17 May 1988) is a Serbian journalist and TV host who founded Balkan Info, an independent Serbian talk show.

== Biography ==
Tešanović was born in 1988 in Vršac, in Socialist Republic of Serbia, which at the time was part of the Socialist Federal Republic of Yugoslavia. He studied philosophy at the Faculty of Philosophy at the University of Belgrade.

He is the founder of a YouTube television and talk show Balkan Info from Belgrade, where he has been working since 2015. Together with Aleksandar Pavković, Nemanja Blagojević and Nemanja Oblaković, he is one of the hosts on this internet television.

The channel has gained wide popularity as a leading alternative media outlet, providing diverse content from controversial coverage of current affairs to popular culture and entertainment. It was the first media of this kind to emerge in Serbia and has exerted major influence on public life, repeatedly reaching over one million views on YouTube.

Tešanović considers himself a Serbian nationalist and has stated that Greater Serbia is a normal aspiration of the Serbian people.

In 2022 he left Balkan Info over personal disputes with the team.
