= Sendai Shirayuri Women's College =

Catholic women's college in Sendai, Japan

Coordinates: 38°19′17.1″N 140°54′13.8″E

- 仙台白百合女子大学
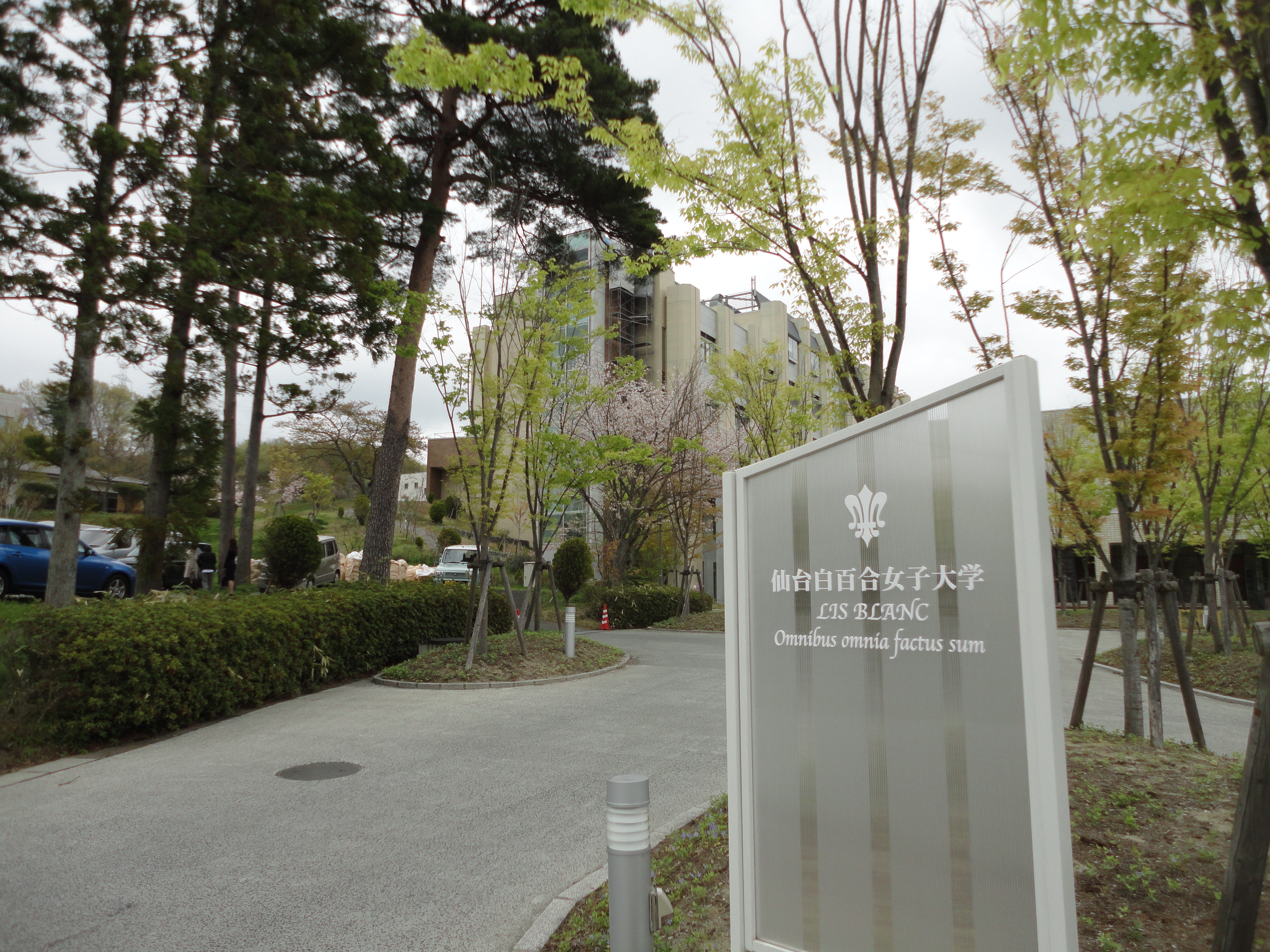
- Entry to the
- Type: Private
- Established: 1966
- Affiliations: Roman Catholic Church
- Location: Sendai, Japan
- Website: http://www.sendai-shirayuri.ac.jp/

Sendai Shirayuri Women's College (仙台白百合女子大学, Sendai shirayuri joshi daigaku) is a private, women's college located in Izumi-ku, Sendai, Miyagi Prefecture, Japan. The school is affiliated with the Roman Catholic Church.

== History ==
The Sisters of Charity of St. Paul from France established a school for women (Sendai Jogakkou) in 1893. This school received official recognition in 1907. It was officially chartered as Sendai Shirayuri Junior College in 1966 and as a four-year college in 1996. The junior college was abolished in April 2003. On July 8, 2025, it was announced that the college will begin admitting male students in April 2027.

== Organization ==
- Faculty of Humanities
  - Department of Child Education
  - Department of Psychology and Social Work
  - Department of Health and Nutrition
  - Department of Global Studies

== Affiliated schools ==
- Sendai Shirayuri Gakuen Junior High School and High School
- Sendai Shirayuri Gakuen Elementary School
- Sendai Shirayuri Gakuen Kindergarten
