= Tohoku Seikatsu Bunka College =

Japanese private university

Coordinates: 38°18′13.8″N 140°52′22.6″E

- 東北生活文化大学
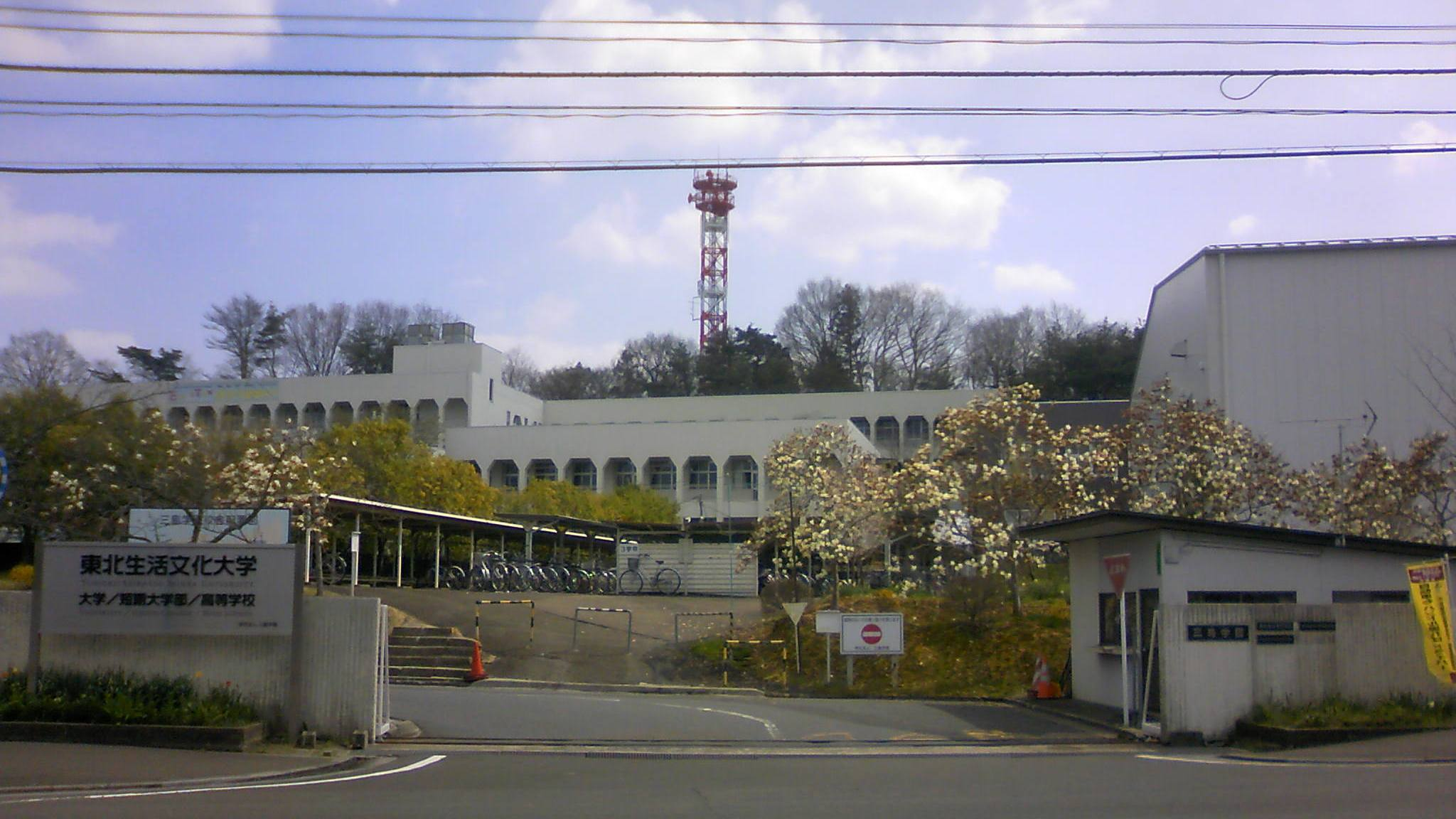
- Type: Private
- Established: 1900
- Location: Izumi-ku, Sendai, Japan
- Mascot: http://www.mishima.ac.jp/univ/index.html

Tohoku Seikatsu Bunka College (東北生活文化大学, Tōhoku seikatsu bunka daigaku) is a private university in Sendai, Miyagi, Japan.

== History ==
The predecessor of the school, a law school, was founded in 1900. In 1947 it was promoted to a women's vocational school. A year later, an attached women's high school was established. It was re-established as a women's junior college in 1951. In 1958 a four-year college opened. In 1987, it became coeducational, adopting the name "Tohoku Seikatsu Bunka College" at the same time.
