= Shellcom Sendai =

Stadium in Izumi-ku, Sendai, Japan

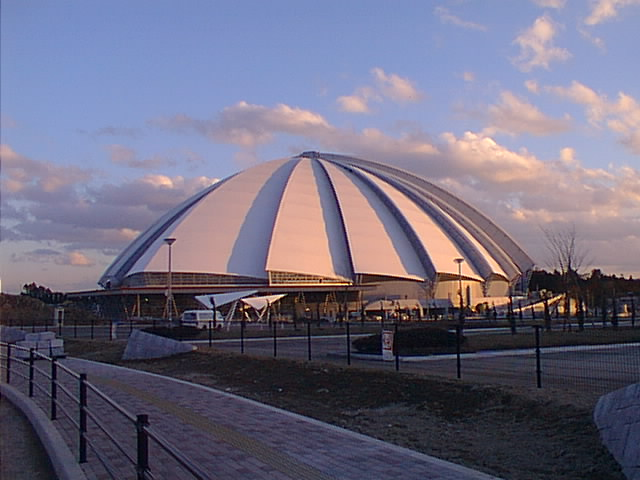
- Interactive map of Shellcom Sendai
- Location: Izumi-ku, Sendai, Japan
- Coordinates: 38.328595°N 140.861592°E
- Owner: city of Sendai
- Capacity: 1,050
- Surface: Artificial turf
- Field size: 115.8 m x 91.5 m

Construction
- Opened: 2000

Shellcom Sendai (シェルコムせんだい, Sherukomu Sendai) is a multipurpose athletic facility located in Izumi-ku, Sendai, Japan. Managed by the city of Sendai, it can be configured for softball, futsal and tennis, among other sports. International events, such as exhibition matches between the United States women's softball team and Japan, have taken place there, and the facility has also hosted concerts by SMAP and other artists.

It is named for its seashell-like appearance. The entire southern half (outfield, when configured for softball) is capable of rotating around the outside of the rest of the stadium, giving an open-air feel at times.

Completed in 2000, the facility has a total of 21,324 m^{2} of enclosed space spread across four levels, including the entrance hall, locker rooms, permanent and temporary seating areas, and the main athletic ground, which is 13,132 m^{2} in size. Up to 1050 seats are available for spectator matches, although most of the time the grounds are being used by residents of the city for recreational purposes.

Part of a larger athletic compound, including several other tennis courts, a gymnasium, and the practice fields for Vegalta Sendai, Shellcom Sendai is located approximately 25 minutes by foot from Izumi-Chūō Station, on the Sendai Subway Namboku Line; and less than five minutes from the Izumi parking area ETC exit of the Tōhoku Expressway.
