= Sendai Shirayuri Gakuen Junior High School and High School =

Educational institutions in Sendai, Japan

Coordinates: 38.3474°N 140.8354°E

- 仙台白百合学園中学校・高等学校
- The school in 2018

Information
- Religious affiliation: Catholicism
- Established: 1893; 133 years ago
- Website: jh.sendaishirayuri.net

Sendai Shirayuri Gakuen Junior High School and High School (仙台白百合学園中学校・高等学校, Sendai Shirayuri Gakuen Chūgakkō Kōtōgakkō; Shirayuri is a reference to the Virgin Mary) is a private Roman Catholic girls' junior and senior high school in Izumi-ku, Sendai, Miyagi Prefecture, Japan.

The campus, which also houses the kindergarten and elementary school, is 15 kilometres (9.3 mi) from the city's center.

Sendai Private School for Girls was established in central Sendai 1893 by the Sisters of St. Paul de Chartres. In 1948 the school received its current name, and in 1998 it moved to its present location. As of 2019 it had 1,080 students.
