= Sunao Sonoda =

Japanese politician (1913–1984)

Senior Third Rank Sunao Sonoda
- 園田 直
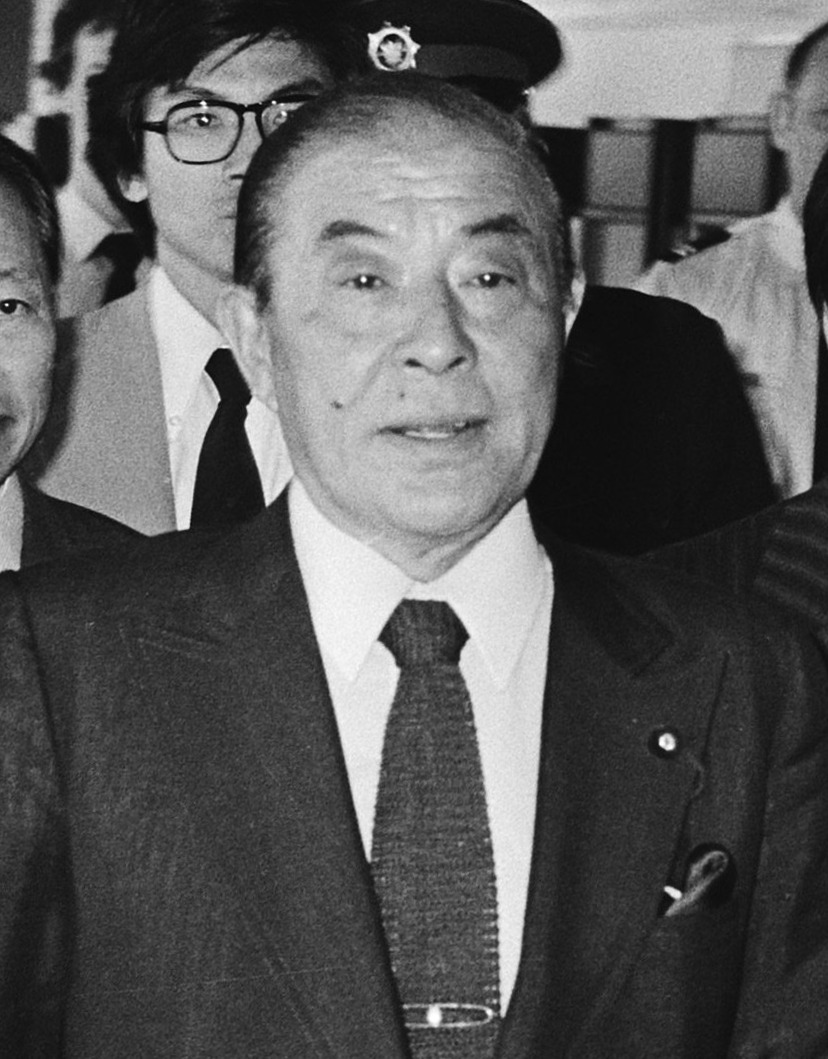
- Sonoda at Schiphol in July 1979

Minister for Foreign Affairs
- In office 18 May 1981 – 30 November 1981
- Prime Minister: Zenkō Suzuki
- Preceded by: Masayoshi Ito
- Succeeded by: Yoshio Sakurauchi
- In office 28 November 1977 – 9 November 1979
- Prime Minister: Takeo Fukuda; Masayoshi Ohira
- Preceded by: Iichirō Hatoyama
- Succeeded by: Saburo Okita

Minister of Health and Welfare
- In office 19 September 1980 – 18 May 1981
- Prime Minister: Zenkō Suzuki
- Preceded by: Kunikichi Saitō
- Succeeded by: Tatsuo Murayama
- In office 25 November 1967 – 30 November 1968
- Prime Minister: Eisaku Satō
- Preceded by: Hideo Bō
- Succeeded by: Noboru Saitō

Chief Cabinet Secretary
- In office 24 December 1976 – 28 November 1977
- Prime Minister: Takeo Fukuda
- Preceded by: Ichitaro Ide
- Succeeded by: Shintaro Abe

Vice Speaker of the House of Representatives
- In office 20 December 1965 – 25 November 1967
- Speaker: Kikuichirō Yamaguchi; Kentarō Ayabe; Mitsujirō Ishii
- Preceded by: Isaji Tanaka
- Succeeded by: Hisao Kodaira

Member of the House of Representatives
- In office 26 April 1947 – 2 April 1984
- Preceded by: Constituency established
- Succeeded by: Hiroyuki Sonoda
- Constituency: Kumamoto 2nd

Personal details
- Born: 11 December 1913 Amakusa, Kumamoto, Japan
- Died: 2 April 1984 (aged 70) Shinjuku, Tokyo, Japan
- Party: LDP (1955–1984)
- Other political affiliations: DP (1947–1950); NDP (1950–1952); Kaishintō (1952–1954); JDP (1954–1955)
- Spouse: Tenkoko Sonoda
- Children: Hiroyuki Sonoda
- Education: Osaka Dental University
- Military career
- Allegiance: Japan
- Branch: Imperial Japanese Army
- Service years: 1935–1945
- Rank: Captain
- Conflicts: Second Sino-Japanese War; Second World War

Sunao Sonoda (園田 直, Sonoda Sunao; 11 December 1913 – 2 April 1984) was a Japanese politician of the Liberal Democratic Party (LDP) who served as minister for foreign affairs and minister of health and welfare. He was called "flying foreign minister" due to his active diplomacy in increasing the role of Japan when he was in office. He was one of the significant figures in normalizing the relations between Japan and China.

== Early life ==
Sonoda was born in Kumamoto Prefecture on 11 December 1913.

== Career ==
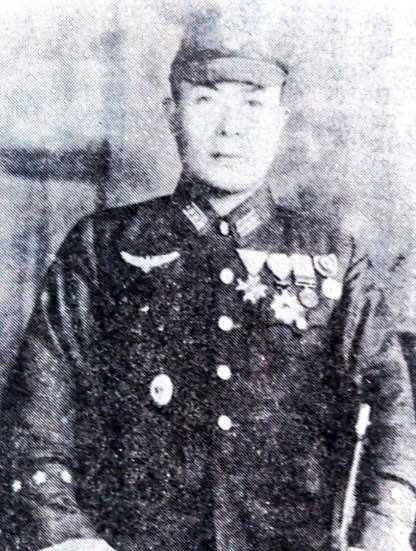
Sonoda as Captain

Sonoda joined the Japanese army in 1938, and served both in China and in the Pacific area during World War II. He was commander of a kamikaze squad during the war. In 1947, Sonoda was elected to the House of Representatives, the lower house of the Diet, representing the Kumamoto Prefecture. He was previously a member of the Democratic Party. Then he became a member of the LDP when the Democratic Party joined the Liberals.

In the 1950s, he was the special envoy of the LDP. He served as parliamentary vice-foreign minister in 1955, and actively involved in normalizing the relations between Japan and the USSR. However, in 1960, he resigned from the LDP due to his objections to the ratification of the US-Japan mutual security treaty.

After rejoining the LDP, Sonoda also served as vice speaker of the lower house for two terms: from 20 December 1965 to 27 December 1966 and from 15 February 1967 to 25 November 1967. He served as minister of health and welfare from 1967 to 1968, which he held again from 1980 to 1981.

In addition, Sonoda was chief cabinet secretary in the cabinet led by Takeo Fukuda from 24 December 1976 to 28 November 1977.

Within the LDP Sonoda was against the Nakasone faction and formed his own. He and the members of his faction joined the faction headed by Fukuda in 1972. However, he later left it and joined the faction headed by Masayoshi Ōhira.

=== Minister of foreign affairs ===
Sonoda served as minister of foreign affairs three times: in the cabinet of Prime Minister Takeo Fukuda from November 1977 to December 1978, in the cabinet of Prime Minister Masayoshi Ohira from December 1978 to November 1979, and in the cabinet of Prime Minister Zenko Suzuki from 17 May to 30 November 1981.

During his first term in the ministry of foreign affairs, Japan signed the treaty of peace and friendship with China. This treaty formed the basis of the relationships between two countries. Sonoda represented his country at the signature of this treaty in Beijing in 1978. He was secondly appointed foreign minister to the cabinet of Masayoshi Ohira who kept this and other three ministries for his own faction. When in office for the second time, Sonoda visited five African countries in July 1979, including Tanzania, Nigeria, Kenya, Ivory Coast and Senegal. He also traveled South America in August 1979.

On 17 May 1981, Sonoda was appointed by Prime Minister and his close friend Zenko Suzuki as foreign minister for the last time due to unexpected resignation of the former Foreign Minister Masayoshi Ito. Sonoda called for adopting the omnidirectional diplomacy and unlike his two predecessors, issued entry visas to Soviet economic delegations. He was replaced by Yoshio Sakurauchi in the post 30 November 1981. The reason for Sonoda's removal from his post was his blunt remarks concerning U.S. policies in June 1981 as well as his other statements detrimental to Japan's relations with South Korea.

== Personal life ==
Sunao Sonoda married twice. His son from the first marriage, Hiroyuki Sonoda, ran for his father seat in the Kumamoto Prefecture in the general elections of 1986. Sonoda'a second wife, Tenkoko Sonoda, also tried to take over her husband's seat in the same election following his death. She was a member of the Diet during her marriage to Sunao. They married after World War II and had two children.

== Death ==
Sonoda died of kidney failure at the hospital of Keio University in Tokyo on 2 April 1984.

== Honours ==
=== National honour ===
- Grand Cordon of the Order of the Rising Sun (2 April 1984; posthumous)

=== Foreign honour ===
- West Germany: Grand Crosses 1st class of the Order of Merit of the Federal Republic of Germany (17 April 1978)
- Bolivia: Grand Cross of the Order of the Condor of the Andes (6 July 1978)
- Mexico: Grand Cross of the Order of the Aztec Eagle (1 November 1978)
- Brazil: Grand Cross of the Order of the Southern Cross (16 August 1979)
- Peru: Grand Cross of the Order of the Sun (18 August 1979)
- Chile: Grand Cross of the Order of Merit (21 August 1979)

House of Representatives (Japan)
Preceded by Kinji Moriyama	Chair, Social and Labour Affairs Committee of the House of Representatives of Japan; 1958–1959	Succeeded by Tadanori Nagayama
Preceded by Isaji Tanaka	Vice-Speaker of the House of Representatives; 1965–1967	Succeeded by Hisao Kodaira
Party political offices
Preceded by Yūtarō Takeyama	Chairman of the Diet Policy Committee, Liberal Democratic Party; 1963–1964	Succeeded by Hideyo Sasaki
Preceded by Shirō Hasegawa	Chairman of the Diet Policy Committee, Liberal Democratic Party; 1968–1970	Succeeded by Toshio Tsukahara
Political offices
Preceded by Hideo Bō	Minister of Health and Welfare; 1967–1968	Succeeded by Noboru Saitō
Preceded by Ichitaro Ide	Chief Cabinet Secretary; 1976–1977	Succeeded by Shintaro Abe
Preceded by Iichirō Hatoyama	Minister for Foreign Affairs; 1977–1979	Succeeded by Saburo Okita
Preceded by Kunikichi Saitō	Minister of Health and Welfare; 1980–1981	Succeeded by Tatsuo Murayama
Preceded by Masayoshi Ito	Minister for Foreign Affairs; 1981	Succeeded by Yoshio Sakurauchi
