= Lully Miura =

Japanese academic

Lully Miura is a Japanese essayist and academic in the field of International Politics.

== Biography ==
Miura graduated from the University of Tokyo and the Graduate School of Public Policy (GraSPP), and completed a PhD at the Graduate School for Law and Politics of the University of Tokyo. She was a researcher at the Policy Alternatives Research Institute (PARI) of the University of Tokyo until 2013, when she was appointed a lecturer.

Miura has founded her own think tank, Yamaneko Research Institute, Inc.

2003 married with Kiyoshi Miura, divorce on 2024.
