= Tenkoko Sonoda =

Japanese politician (1919–2015)

- 園田 天光光
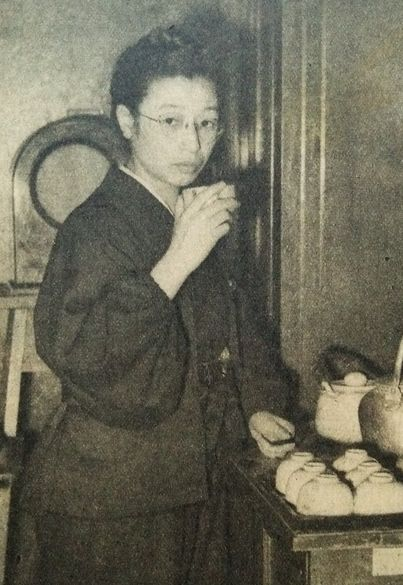
- Sonoda in 1949

Member of the House of Representatives
- In office 10 April 1946 – 28 August 1952
- Preceded by: Constituency established
- Succeeded by: Takaichi Nakamura
- Constituency: Tokyo 2nd (1946–1947); Tokyo 7th (1947–1952)

Personal details
- Born: 23 January 1919 Tokyo, Japan
- Died: 29 January 2015 (aged 96) Tokyo, Japan
- Party: Liberal Democratic
- Other political affiliations: JSP (1946–1948); LFP (1948–1952); Kaishintō (1952–1954); JDP (1954–1955)
- Spouse: Sunao Sonoda
- Children: Hiroyuki Sonoda (stepson)

Tenkōkō Sonoda (園田 天光光, Sonoda Tenkōkō; 23 January 1919 – 29 January 2015) was a Japanese politician who was a member of the Japanese Diet from 1946–1952. In 1950, she became the first woman in Japanese political history to have a baby while in office.

== Biography ==
Sonoda was born in Tokyo on 23 January 1919.

Tenkoko Sonoda was the widow of Minister for Foreign Affairs Sunao Sonoda. She was the step-mother to Hiroyuki Sonoda.

== Political career ==
She was a socialist at first, and belonged to the Japan Socialist Party (the Social Democratic Party Japan; SDPJ) and the Workers and Farmers Party (Maoism) in the Diet, but changed her opinion by herself to be conservative after her marriage to Sunao.

She was a member of the representative committee of the openly revisionist lobby Nippon Kaigi, to which her son-in-law Hiroyuki is also affiliated.

Sonoda died on 29 January 2015 at the age of 96.
