= Satoru Mizushima =

Japanese film director (born 1949)

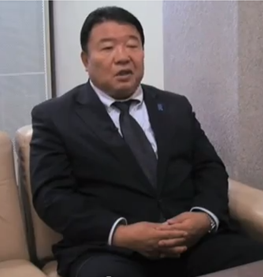
Satoru Mizushima (October 11, 2012)

Satoru Mizushima (水島 総, Mizushima Satoru; born June 18, 1949 in Kakegawa, Shizuoka Prefecture) is a Japanese filmmaker.

== Early life ==
Mizushima graduated from Waseda University majoring in German literature.

== Career ==
Mizushima is the main host of the right-wing Japanese media organization, Channel Sakura, which maintains an active YouTube broadcasting account "SakuraSoTV". The Japan Times has said Channel Sakura "is widely known for its glorification of Japan's role in World War II and for airing shows that deny the Japanese military forced Korean women into sexual slavery."

In 1988, he released his first film, The Story of the Panda, about a Japanese woman who helps Chinese people raise a panda. In 1992, he released his second film, Goodbye Heiji, about a blind girl and her seeing-eye dog.

== Historical negationism ==
He can often be seen and heard during nationalist rallies in Tokyo, especially during anti-Chinese protests. He denies Japan's destructive role in World War II. In 2007, he released The Truth about Nanjing, a Japanese film that denies the occurrence of the Nanjing Massacre. The film was based on the work of Shūdō Higashinakano.

Mizushima has said it is an "indisputable fact" that no massacre occurred and he is "certain there was no bloodshed and rapes of civilians". He dismissed evidence of the massacre, calling it "faked" and "Chinese Communist propaganda". He described several Western witnesses who were in Nanjing at the time as communist spies. Estimates for the death toll vary but serious historians do not doubt that the massacre occurred. He alleged that there were no illegal deaths, whereas historians have put the number between 20,000 and 300,000 deaths.

In 2010 he was one of the founders of Ganbare Nippon, a nationalist group.

Mizushima has said The Asahi Shimbun, a liberal newspaper, has "fabricated history and transmitted lies" and called for the newspaper to stop publishing.

== See also ==
- Japanese war crimes
