= Balkan Info =

Media company in Serbia

- Available in: Serbian
- Owner: Private
- Website: www.balkaninfo.rs
- Commercial: Yes
- Launched: June 2015; 11 years ago
- Current status: Online

Balkan Info (Serbian Cyrillic: Балкан инфо) is an independent media production company based in Belgrade, Serbia.

It was founded in 2015 by journalist and author Teša Tešanović, who was later joined by Marko Jeremić, Aleksandar Pavković, Ognjen Radosavljević, Nemanja Blagojević and Nemanja Oblaković.

Balkan Info's team has interviewed more than 400 prominent individuals including Milan Gutović, Nele Karajlić, Ljubodrag Simonović, Nebojša Pavković, Draško Stanivuković, Muamer Zukorlić, Ajs Nigrutin and many more. It has been criticized for its interviews with Serbian nationalists, far-right conspiracy theorists and anti-vax activists.
