= Takeo Hiranuma =

Japanese politician

- 平沼 赳夫
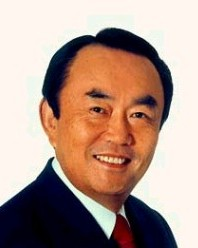
- Official portrait, 2000

Minister of Economy, Trade and Industry
- In office 6 January 2001 – 22 September 2003
- Prime Minister: Yoshiro Mori; Junichiro Koizumi
- Preceded by: Office established
- Succeeded by: Shoichi Nakagawa

Minister of International Trade and Industry
- In office 4 July 2000 – 6 January 2001
- Prime Minister: Yoshiro Mori
- Preceded by: Takashi Fukaya
- Succeeded by: Office abolished

Minister of Transport
- In office 8 August 1995 – 11 January 1996
- Prime Minister: Tomiichi Murayama
- Preceded by: Shizuka Kamei
- Succeeded by: Yoshiyuki Kamei

Member of the House of Representatives
- In office 23 June 1980 – 22 October 2017
- Preceded by: Shin'ichi Noritake
- Succeeded by: Toshiko Abe
- Constituency: Okayama 1st (1980–1996); Okayama 3rd (1996–2017)

Personal details
- Born: 3 August 1939 (age 87) Shibuya, Tokyo, Japan
- Party: Liberal Democratic (1980–2005; 2015–present)
- Other political affiliations: SPJ (2010–2012); JRP (2012–2014); PJK (2014–2015)
- Spouse: Masako Hiranuma
- Children: Keiichiro; Shōjirō; Hiroko
- Education: Keio University
- Website: http://www.hiranuma.org/

Takeo Hiranuma (平沼 赳夫, Hiranuma Takeo; born 3 August 1939) is a former Japanese politician who served as a member of the House of Representatives. He is a member of the Liberal Democratic Party and is former chairperson of the Party for Future Generations.

== Early life ==
Takeo Hiranuma was born in Tokyo in 1939. His mother was a grandniece of Prime Minister Kiichirō Hiranuma. He and his father Kyoshiro were adopted by the Hiranuma family, and took its name, when Takeo was two years old. Kiichiro was imprisoned as a Class A war criminal at Sugamo Prison in 1946, making Kyoshiro the de facto patriarch of the family. As the family's assets were largely frozen, Kyoshiro was forced into entrepreneurship, establishing a school and trading company and serving as the director of an oil company.

Hiranuma attended Azabu High School and Keio University, and worked in the private sector at Nitto Boseki from 1962 to 1973. He left to become a political aide for Ichiro Nakagawa and Eisaku Satō. He then ran for a seat in the House of Representatives twice and failed, but was finally elected in 1980 as a member of Japan's Liberal Democratic Party.

== Political career ==
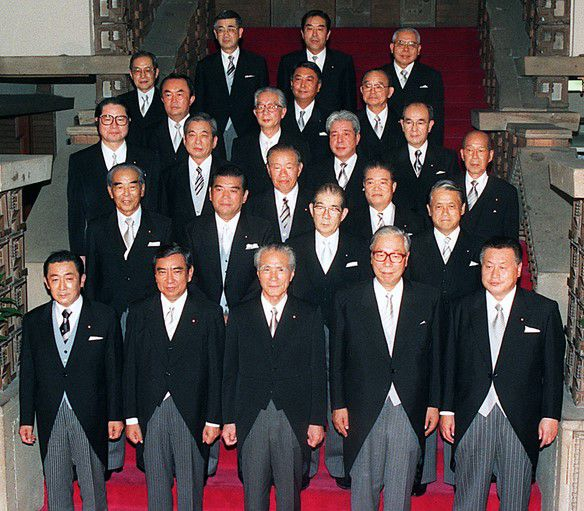
Hiranuma with members of Murayama Reshuffled Cabinet (at the Prime Minister's Official Residence on August 8, 1995)

=== Liberal Democratic Party ===
In 1986, Hiranuma led an intra-LDP revolt against Prime Minister Yasuhiro Nakasone's decision to fire his education minister Masayuki Fujio after several statements that offended Chinese, Koreans and other Asians. Hiranuma publicly attacked Nakasone for making concessions and groveling to foreign governments.

Hiranuma served as vice minister for the ministry of finance in 1987 and minister of transport in 1995.

Hiranuma was made minister of international trade and industry in July 2000. The ministry was renamed Ministry of Economy, Trade and Industry in January 2001.

Prime Minister Junichiro Koizumi reappointed Hiranuma to head METI in April 2001, breaking party custom by not seeking permission of Hiranuma's faction leaders Shizuka Kamei and Takami Eto. Hiranuma retained his post in the cabinet reshuffle of September 2002, becoming the longest-serving trade minister of Japan in postwar period. Under the Koizumi government, Hiranuma came into conflict with Heizo Takenaka, an economist appointed to the Cabinet to promote Japanese economic revitalization. Hiranuma orchestrated a government bailout of the Daiei supermarket chain in 2003 over Takenaka's objections.

Hiranuma was fired in August 2005 when he refused to support Koizumi's plans to privatize Japan Post. He was not endorsed by the Liberal Democratic Party in the 2005 general election, but was nonetheless reelected.

=== Third party activities ===
As early as 2000, both Hiranuma and Tokyo Governor Shintaro Ishihara had publicly proposed creating a "conservative urban party" that would effectively split the LDP into two parties, one representing urban interests and one representing rural interests.

On 10 April 2010, Hiranuma, Ishihara and several other politicians established a new political party, the Sunrise Party of Japan. This party merged with the Japan Restoration Party on 17 November 2012. Hiranuma was one of a number of politicians who subsequently left the Japan Restoration Party to form the Party for Future Generations on 1 August 2014, but was one of only two members of this party to win a seat in the 2014 general election.

Hiranuma rejoined the Liberal Democratic Party on 25 September 2015. He announced in September 2017 that he would not run in the 2017 general election, signaling his retirement from politics.

== Personal life ==
Hiranuma married Masako Tokugawa, a great-granddaughter of Tokugawa Yoshinobu and a niece of Princess Takamatsu. His son, Shōjirō Hiranuma, was elected to the House of Representatives in the 2021 general election.

== Controversial statements ==
Following a downgrade of Japan's sovereign credit rating by Moody's in 2002, Hiranuma stated that ''Half of the people of Botswana are AIDS patients... It is outrageous [that Japan's] rating is lower than such a country.'' He later apologized for the statements.

In 2006, he argued against the proposed imperial reform bill on the grounds that Princess Aiko could potentially marry and have children with a "blue-eyed foreigner" in the future. At a public rally organized by Nippon Kaigi, he stated that Japan's "unbroken male line for 125 generations" was "the precious, precious treasure of the Japanese race, as well as a world treasure."

During a 2009 speech, Hiranuma criticized diet member Renhō's support of budget cuts to Japan's supercomputer program by insinuating that she may not have Japan's best interests at heart because she is not a Japanese national by birth.

== Honours ==
- Grand Cordon of the Order of the Rising Sun (2018)
