= Izumi-ku, Sendai =

Izumi 泉区
- Ward
- Izumi Ward
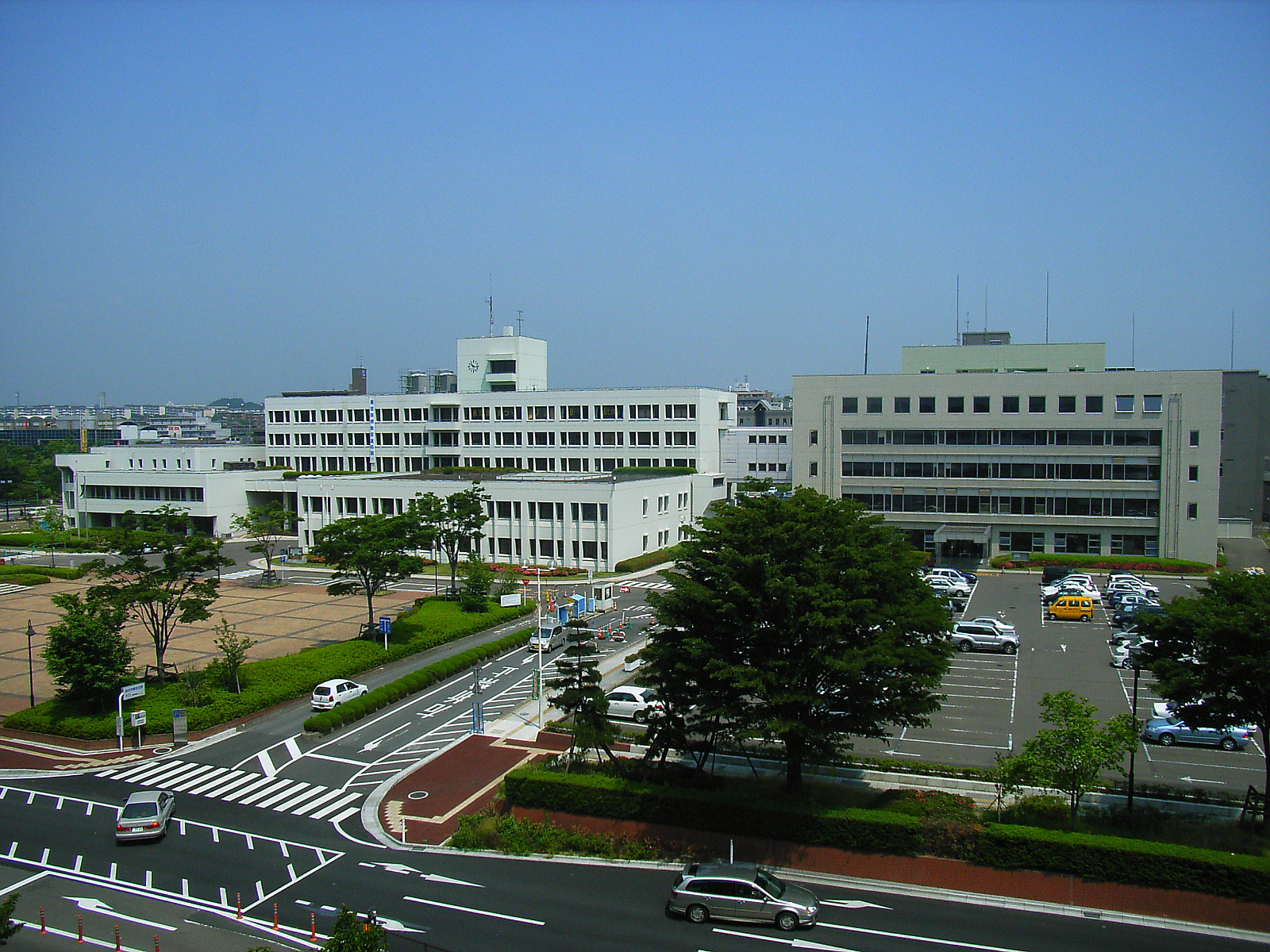
- Izumi Ward Office

- Flag

- Location of Izumi-ku in Sendai

- Coordinates: 38°19′35″N 140°52′53″E
- Country: Japan
- Region: Tohoku
- Prefecture: Miyagi
- City: Sendai

Area
  - Total: 146.61 km^{2} (56.61 sq mi)

Population (July 1, 2017)
  - Total: 215,048
  - Density: 1,470/km^{2} (3,800/sq mi)
- Time zone: UTC+9 (Japan Standard Time)
- Symbols
  - Tree: Pine
  - Flower: Narcissus
  - Bird: Common pheasant
- Phone number: 022-372-3111
- Address: 2-1-1 Izumi-Chuo, Izumi-ku, Sendai-shi, Miyagi-ken 981-3189
- Website: Official website (in Japanese)

Izumi-ku (泉区) is the northernmost ward of the city of Sendai, in Miyagi Prefecture, Japan. As of 1 July 2017, the ward had a population of 215,048 and a population density of 1470 persons per km^{2} in 90,336 households. The total area of the ward was 146.61 square kilometres (56.61 sq mi). Izumi-ku is the twelfth-largest ward in Japan in terms of area, and third-largest in Sendai (behind Aoba-ku and Taihaku-ku). Formerly the independent city of Izumi, the population of the area expanded extremely rapidly from the mid-1970s onwards as a bedroom community for central Sendai. In 1988, the city of Izumi was annexed by Sendai.

== Geography ==
Izumi-ku is located inland, forming the northern portion of Sendai metropolis. The area is mountainous to the west, with Izumigatake as the highest point at 1172 meters.

=== Neighboring municipalities ===
- Miyagi Prefecture
  - Aoba-ku, Sendai
  - Miyagino-ku, Sendai
  - Tomiya
  - Taiwa

== History ==
The area of present-day Izumi-ku was part of ancient Mutsu Province, and has been settled since at least the Japanese Paleolithic period. The area was inhabited by the Emishi people, and came under the control of the imperial dynasty during the late Nara period. During the Heian period, it was controlled by the Abe clan, followed by the Northern Fujiwara clan of Hiraizumi. During the Sengoku period, the area was dominated by various samurai clans before coming under the control of the Date clan during the Edo period, who ruled Sendai Domain under the Tokugawa shogunate. With the establishment of the post-Meiji restoration municipalities system, the area was organised into the villages of Fukuoka, Nishi-Tanaka, Nenoshiroishi, Hōzawa, Sanezawa, Ogaku, Nanakita, Ichinazaka, Matsumori, Furuuchi, Kamiyagari, No, Aramaki and Kitane within Miyagi District of Miyagi Prefecture prior to April 1, 1889

=== Municipal timeline ===
- April 1, 1889 - In Miyagi District, the villages of Izumidake (merger of the villages of Fukuoka, Nishi-Tanaka, Nenoshiroishi, Hōzawa, Sanezawa and Ogaku) and Nanakita (merger of the villages of Nanakita, Ichinazaka, Matsumori, Furuuchi, Kamiyagari, No, Aramaki and Kitane) were established.
- September 7, 1897 - Izumidake was renamed to Nenoshiroishi.
- April 1, 1931 - A portion of Nanakita (Aramaki and Kitane) was annexed by Sendai (specifically now part of Aoba-ku).
- April 10, 1955 - The remaining portion of Nanakita and Nenoshiroishi were combined to create the village of Izumi.
- August 1, 1957 - The village of Izumi was elevated to town status. (see Municipalities of Japan)
- November 1, 1971 - The town of Izumi was elevated to a city status.
- March 1, 1988 - Izumi was annexed to Sendai
- April 1, 1989 - When Sendai was designated as a city by the national government, Izumi-ku was formed as one of the five wards of the city.

History of Izumi-ku since 1889. Unless noted, all places are villages
until April 1, 1889	April 1, 1889	September 7, 1897	April 1, 1931	April 10, 1955	August 1, 1957	November 1, 1971	March 1, 1988	April 1, 1989
Miyagi District						Izumi	Sendai	
Fukuoka (副岡村)	Izumidake (泉嶽村)	Nenoshirorishi (根白石村)	Nenoshirorishi (根白石村)	Izumi (泉村)	Izumi (泉町) promotion to town	Izumi (泉市) promotion to city	Merged to Sendai	Izumi-ku is founded
Nishi-Tanaka (西田中村)	Izumidake (泉嶽村)	Nenoshirorishi (根白石村)	Nenoshirorishi (根白石村)	Izumi (泉村)	Izumi (泉町) promotion to town	Izumi (泉市) promotion to city	Merged to Sendai	Izumi-ku is founded
Nenoshiroishi (根白石村)	Izumidake (泉嶽村)	Nenoshirorishi (根白石村)	Nenoshirorishi (根白石村)	Izumi (泉村)	Izumi (泉町) promotion to town	Izumi (泉市) promotion to city	Merged to Sendai	Izumi-ku is founded
Hōzawa (朴沢村)	Izumidake (泉嶽村)	Nenoshirorishi (根白石村)	Nenoshirorishi (根白石村)	Izumi (泉村)	Izumi (泉町) promotion to town	Izumi (泉市) promotion to city	Merged to Sendai	Izumi-ku is founded
Sanezawa (実沢村)	Izumidake (泉嶽村)	Nenoshirorishi (根白石村)	Nenoshirorishi (根白石村)	Izumi (泉村)	Izumi (泉町) promotion to town	Izumi (泉市) promotion to city	Merged to Sendai	Izumi-ku is founded
Ogaku (小角村)	Izumidake (泉嶽村)	Nenoshirorishi (根白石村)	Nenoshirorishi (根白石村)	Izumi (泉村)	Izumi (泉町) promotion to town	Izumi (泉市) promotion to city	Merged to Sendai	Izumi-ku is founded
Nanakita (七北田村)	Nanakita (七北田村)		Nanakita (七北田村)	Izumi (泉村)	Izumi (泉町) promotion to town	Izumi (泉市) promotion to city	Merged to Sendai	Izumi-ku is founded
Ichinazaka (市名坂村)	Nanakita (七北田村)		Nanakita (七北田村)	Izumi (泉村)	Izumi (泉町) promotion to town	Izumi (泉市) promotion to city	Merged to Sendai	Izumi-ku is founded
Matsumori (松森村)	Nanakita (七北田村)		Nanakita (七北田村)	Izumi (泉村)	Izumi (泉町) promotion to town	Izumi (泉市) promotion to city	Merged to Sendai	Izumi-ku is founded
Furuuchi (古内)	Nanakita (七北田村)		Nanakita (七北田村)	Izumi (泉村)	Izumi (泉町) promotion to town	Izumi (泉市) promotion to city	Merged to Sendai	Izumi-ku is founded
Kamiyagari (上谷刈村)	Nanakita (七北田村)		Nanakita (七北田村)	Izumi (泉村)	Izumi (泉町) promotion to town	Izumi (泉市) promotion to city	Merged to Sendai	Izumi-ku is founded
No (野村)	Nanakita (七北田村)		Nanakita (七北田村)	Izumi (泉村)	Izumi (泉町) promotion to town	Izumi (泉市) promotion to city	Merged to Sendai	Izumi-ku is founded
Aramaki (荒巻村)	Nanakita (七北田村)		Merged to Sendai					Aoba-ku
Kitane (北根村)	Nanakita (七北田村)		Merged to Sendai					Aoba-ku

== Economy ==
Although Izumi-ku is mostly a residential area, it is also home to several college campuses; and companies such as Alps, Freescale Semiconductor, and Toppan have a large presence in the Izumi Parktown Industrial Park.

== Education ==
=== Colleges and universities ===
- Tohoku Gakuin University - Izumi campus
- Sendai Shirayuri Women's College
- Tohoku Seikatsu Bunka College
- Seiwa Gakuen College

=== Primary and secondary schools ===
Izumi-ku has 29 public elementary schools and 17 public junior high schools operated by the city government. The ward also has three public high schools operated by the Miyagi Prefectural Board of Education. The Tohoku International School and Sendai Shirayuri Gakuen Junior High School and High School (a private school) are also located in the ward.

== Transportation ==
=== Railway ===
- Sendai Subway - Namboku Line
  - Izumi-Chūō - Yaotome - Kuromatsu

=== Highway ===
- Tōhoku Expressway – (Izumi Interchange; Izumi Parking Area (ETC exit gate))
- National Route 4
- National Route 457

== Notable buildings ==
- Yurtec Stadium Sendai (Sendai Stadium)
- Shellcom Sendai
