= Party for Japanese Kokoro =

Party for Japanese Kokoro 日本のこころ
- Leader: Masashi Nakano
- Secretary-General: Masamune Wada
- Founded: 1 August 2014
- Dissolved: 1 November 2018
- Split from: Japan Restoration Party
- Merged into: Liberal Democratic Party
- Headquarters: 1-11-28 Nagatachō, Chiyoda, Tokyo 100-0014, Japan
- Ideology: Japanese nationalism; Japanese neoconservatism; Economic liberalism
- Political position: Far-right
- Colors: Orange

Website
- nippon-kokoro.jp

The Party for Japanese Kokoro (日本のこころ, Nippon no Kokoro; "Spirit of Japan"), officially the Party to Cherish the Heart of Japan (日本のこころを大切にする党, Nippon no kokoro o taisetsu ni suru tō), was a Japanese political party. It was formed as the Party for Future Generations (次世代の党, Jisedai no Tō) on 1 August 2014 by a group of Diet members led by Shintarō Ishihara. The party adopted its final name in December 2015, and ended up dissolving in November 2018.

== History ==
=== Formation ===
The Japan Restoration Party was formed in 2012 and was led by Tōru Hashimoto and Ishihara. In May 2014 Hashimoto and Ishihara announced that the party had agreed to split due to disagreement over a merger with another opposition party, the Unity Party. Ishihara's faction left the JRP to form the Party for Future Generations, which registered as a party on 1 August 2014. Takeo Hiranuma was chosen as the party's leader and he appointed Hiroshi Yamada as Secretary-General and Ishihara as chief advisor.

=== Party for Future Generations (2014–2015) ===
Logo of the original Party for Future Generations

The party suffered a near-wipeout at the 47th general election in December 2014, collapsing from 19 seats in the House of Representatives to just two, with Hiranuma and party advisor Hiroyuki Sonoda the only two of the party's 48 candidates to win a seat. Senior party members who lost their seat included Ishihara, Yamada and policy committee chairman Hiroshi Nakada. The party received 2.65% of the proportional representation vote, just clearing the 2% minimum required to ensure continued existence as an official party within the Diet. Ishihara announced his retirement from politics two days after the election.

=== Party for Japanese Kokoro (2015–2018) ===
Following Hiranuma and Sonoda's defection from the party back to the LDP, Kyoko Nakayama was elected unopposed as party leader on 28 August 2015 and officially started a two-year term from 1 October. Secretary-General Shigefumi Matsuzawa initially intended to contest the leadership vote and maintain the party's "unbiased" stance towards the ruling LDP, as opposed to Nakayama wanting to work with the government. Rather than force a vote that would split the party, Matsuzawa instead chose to resign and sit as an independent; his resignation was accepted at the 28 August meeting and Masamune Wada replaced him as secretary-general.

In November 2018, Masashi Nakano, the last member was transferred to LDP. The party was dissolved.

== Policies ==
The party's policies had been described as a combination of conservatism in matters of national security, immigration law, and traditional cultural values, as well as 'liberalism' in economic issues (e.g. regulatory reform).

== Members ==
At the time of the party's name change in December 2015, it had five members in the House of Councillors in the national Diet. Katsuhiko Eguchi opposed the name change and joined the Initiatives from Osaka party, leaving the party with four members in the national parliament. In April 2016 Kazuyuki Hamada, the only party member facing re-election in the summer 2016 House of Councillors election, resigned from the party to join Initiatives from Osaka. In November 2016 Wada left the party and joined the LDP's parliamentary group within the House of Councillors, but did not officially join the LDP.

In October 2015 the party had a further eight members in regional assemblies.

In November 2018, Nakano rejoined the Liberal Democratic Party.

== Presidents of PFJK ==
| No. | Name | Image | Term of office | |
| No. | Name | Image | Took office | Left office |
|---|---|---|---|---|
Split from: Restoration Party
| 1 | Takeo Hiranuma | | 1 August 2014 | 25 September 2015 |
| — | Masamune Wada | | 25 September 2015 | 1 October 2015 |
| 2 | Kyoko Nakayama | | 1 October 2015 | 25 September 2017 |
| 3 | Masashi Nakano | | 25 September 2017 | 1 November 2018 |
Successor parties: Liberal Democratic Party

== Election results ==
=== House of Representatives ===
House of Representatives
| Election | Leader | # of candidates | # of seats won | # of Constituency votes | % of Constituency vote | # of PR Block votes | % of PR Block vote | Government |
|---|---|---|---|---|---|---|---|---|
| 2014 | Takeo Hiranuma | 2/48 | 2 / 475 | 947,395 | 1.79% | 1,414,919 | 2.65% | LDP-KM Cabinet |
| 2017 | Masashi Nakano | 0/2 | 0 / 475 | - | - | 85,552 | 0.15% | LDP-KM Cabinet |

=== House of Councillors ===
House of Councillors
| Election year | Leader | Seats | | Nationwide | | Prefecture | | Status |
| Election year | Leader | Total | Contested | Number | % | Number | % | Status |
|---|---|---|---|---|---|---|---|---|
| 2016 | Kyoko Nakayama | 3 / 242 | 3 / 121 | 734,024 | 1.31% | 535,517 | 0.95% | Opposition |

== See also ==
- Category:Party for Japanese Kokoro politicians
