= Sunrise Party =

Former Japanese political party

Sunrise Party 太陽の党 Taiyō no Tō
- Abbreviation: Taiyō, TT
- President: Shintaro Ishihara; Takeo Hiranuma
- Secretary-General: Hiroyuki Sonoda
- Councillors leader: Takao Fujii
- Founded: 10 April 2010
- Dissolved: 17 November 2012
- Split from: Liberal Democratic Party
- Succeeded by: Japan Restoration Party
- Ideology: Japanese nationalism; Conservatism
- Colours: Red and blue

Website
- www.taiyounotou.jp

The Sunrise Party (太陽の党, Taiyō no Tō; literally "Party of the Sun", SP), formerly known as the Sunrise Party of Japan (たちあがれ日本, Tachiagare Nippon; literally "Rise up, Japan!", SPJ), was a conservative and nationalist political party in Japan. The SPJ was formed on 10 April 2010 by five Japanese lawmakers and parliamentarians, four former members of the Liberal Democratic Party (LDP) and an independent politician. It was named by the then-Tokyo Metropolitan Governor Shintarō Ishihara who supported the action. At its inception, the party described itself as an "anti-DPJ, non-LDP" political force.

It was renamed and re-formed on 14 November 2012 by co-leaders Ishihara and Takeo Hiranuma. The party merged into the Japan Restoration Party on 17 November 2012.

== Party name ==
When the party was founded in 2010 as "Tachiagare Nippon" – the Sunrise Party of Japan. It was named by Shintaro Ishihara, who was then still governor of Tokyo. In 2012, after Ishihara stepped down as governor and announced he would form a new party he renamed the party "The Sunrise Party". The Japanese name of the party, "Taiyō no Tō", literally translates as "party of the sun", and is taken from Ishihara's novel Season of the Sun. Some other proposed names had included "Nippon Kaishin Tō" (Japan reform and progress party) and "Reimei" (Dawn).

== 2010–2011 arrivals and departures ==
Yoshio Nakagawa belonged to the party but did not contest his Hokkaidō seat in the 2010 House of Councillors election, and ran instead on the party's national proportional list. Toranosuke Katayama won the party's only proportional seat in this election. LDP Councillor Kyōko Nakayama (proportional, up in 2013) had joined the party in June 2010 together with her husband Nariaki Nakayama, a former LDP Representative.

Kaoru Yosano, one of the founding members, left this party on 13 January 2011 to join the Naoto Kan's cabinet as the minister of economic and fiscal policy.

== 2012 reformation ==
In October 2012, when Ishihara stepped down as Tokyo governor and announced that he would set up a new national political party, it was expected that he would form it with members of the Sunrise party. When announced by co-leaders Ishihara and Hiranuma in mid-November, 2012, The Sunrise Party incorporated all five members of the SPJ. The SP looked to form a coalition with other small parties including Osaka Mayor Tōru Hashimoto's Japan Restoration Party for possibly impending elections. On 13 November, Ishihara stated that: "Taiyō no Tō is only a part of the process. We will definitely form a coalition before the [lower house] election. I don't mind if [our party] is absorbed [into the alliance] and vanishes".

== Aborted merger with Genzei Nippon ==
On 15 November 2012, Ishihara and Takashi Kawamura of the Nagoya-based Genzai Nippon (Tax Reduction Party). announced that they would merge. The following day Ishihara had a meeting with Hashimoto and decided to unilaterally cancel the plans for the Genzai Nippon merger. Kawamura was disappointed but said he would continue to seek a merger with Ishihara's group.

== Merger with Japan Restoration Party ==
On 17 November 2012, Ishihara and Hashimoto decided to merge their parties, with Ishihara becoming the head of the Japan Restoration Party. Your Party would not join the party, nor would Genzei Nippon, as the latter party's anti-consumption tax increase policy does not match the JRP's pro-consumption tax policy.

== Presidents ==
No.	Name	Term of office	
No.	Name	Took office	Left office
Split from: Liberal Democratic Party
1	Co-leadership: Takeo Hiranuma / Kaoru Yosano	10 April 2010	13 January 2011
2	Takeo Hiranuma	13 January 2011	13 November 2012
3	Co-leadership: Takeo Hiranuma / Shintaro Ishihara	13 November 2012	19 November 2012
4	Shintaro Ishihara	13 November 2012	19 November 2012
Successor party: Restoration Party

== Politicians ==
- Takeo Hiranuma
- Hiroyuki Sonoda
- Takao Fujii
- Toranosuke Katayama
- Kyoko Nakayama
- Nariaki Nakayama
- Shintarō Ishihara

== Election results ==
=== House of Councillors ===
Election	Leader	Constituency			Party list			Seats		Position	Status
Election	Leader	Votes	%	Seats	Votes	%	Seats	Election	Total	Position	Status
2010	Takeo Hiranuma	328,475	0.56	0 / 73	1,232,207	2.11	1 / 48	1 / 121	3 / 242	7th	Opposition
