= Japan Restoration Party =

Japan Restoration Party 日本維新の会 Nippon Ishin no Kai
- Abbreviation: JRP, NIK
- Leader: Tōru Hashimoto
- Secretary-General: Ichirō Matsui
- Representatives leader: Yorihisa Matsuno
- Founded: 28 September 2012
- Dissolved: 31 July 2014
- Merger of: Osaka Restoration Association; Sunrise Party
- Split from: Liberal Democratic Party; Democratic Party; Your Party; Spirit of Japan Party
- Succeeded by: Japan Innovation Party
- Headquarters: Osaka, Osaka Prefecture, Japan
- Ideology: Japanese nationalism; Neoconservatism; Neoliberalism; Economic liberalism; Right-wing populism
- Political position: Right-wing to far-right
- Colors: Green (official); Lime green (customary)

Website
- j-ishin.jp (archived)

The Japan Restoration Party (日本維新の会, Nippon Ishin no Kai), also referred to in English as the Japan Restoration Association, was a Japanese political party. It was launched on 12 September 2012 and gained official recognition on 28 September 2012. The party grew from the regional Osaka Restoration Association, headed by Tōru Hashimoto, Mayor of Osaka, and Ichirō Matsui, Governor of Osaka Prefecture.

On 17 November 2012 Hashimoto and Shintaro Ishihara, leader of the Sunrise Party, announced a merger of their parties to create a "third force" to contest the general election of December 2012. The merged organization, which retained the name "Japan Restoration Party", was at that time Japan's only national political party based outside Tokyo. After the election it had 54 seats in the lower house and 9 members in the upper house.

On May 28, 2014, co-leaders Hashimoto and Ishihara agreed to split the party after many internal differences, including disagreement over a proposed merger with the Unity Party. As a result, Ishihara's group split off from the JRP and formed the Party for Future Generations. Later, Hashimoto and Kenji Eda of the Unity Party agreed to merge their parties. The JRP was subsequently dissolved and the result of the merger was the formation of the Japan Innovation Party.

== History ==
=== Party launch and early days ===
National political parties in Japan require a minimum of five Diet members to be recognized, and in 2012 the party gained seven sitting Diet members through defections from other parties. On 28 September 2012 an application for party recognition was submitted to the Ministry of the Interior through the Osaka prefectural electoral board. This was accepted and the party was officially launched. The Osaka Restoration Association, also headed by Hashimoto and Matsui, was placed under the umbrella of the new national party.

The first meeting of the nine JRA lawmakers was held on 3 October 2012. Yorihisa Matsuno, a member of the House of Representatives who had formerly been in the Democratic Party of Japan, was selected as the leader of the nine lawmakers, and rules of conduct were also adopted.

The party's first general meeting was held on 6 October 2012, with Matsuno formally becoming a deputy party leader, along with Yutaka Imai, a member of the Osaka Prefectural Assembly. Hashimoto said that in cases where national NRA members and regional assembly members could not agree he would make a decision.

=== Merger with the Sunrise Party ===
After much discussion, on 17 November 2012 Ishihara and Hashimoto decided to merge their parties, with Ishihara becoming the head of the Japan Restoration Party. Your Party would not join the party, nor would Tax Cuts Japan, as the latter party's opposition to any increase in the consumption tax did not match the JRP's policy in favour of an increase. Following Hashimoto's controversial remarks on the issue of comfort women during World War II, Yoshimi Watanabe announced that Your Party had decided to end their planned alliance for the upcoming Upper House elections.

=== Split with former Sunrise members ===
On May 28, 2014, co-leaders Hashimoto and Shintarō Ishihara agreed to split the party after many internal differences and a proposed merger with the Unity Party, especially their differences regarding the Constitution of Japan. The division is to be in accordance with the Political Parties Subsidies Act in order to split the subsidies each group receives. Ishihara's followers created a new party, the Party for Future Generations (次世代の党, Jisedai no tō), led by Takeo Hiranuma. The party launched with 19 representatives and 3 councilors on 1 August 2014, the day after the formalities of the "dissolution" of the Japan Restoration Party. Hashimoto's followers relaunched a new Japan Restoration Party, which has a similar organization to the old one. Hashimoto's Japan Restoration Party planned to unite with the Unity Party within 1–2 months. Upon the division of the party, two representatives chose to join neither group, and became independents.

=== Merger with Unity Party ===
On 22 September 2014, Hashimoto and Kenji Eda of the Unity Party agreed to merge their parties. The JRP was subsequently dissolved; the result of the merger is the Japan Innovation Party.

== Ideology ==
The party supported legalizing same-sex marriage.

The party advocated revising the Constitution of Japan, which it characterized as "the Occupation Constitution".

When the Japanese government proposed to revise the laws so that Japan's military would be able to mobilise overseas, the party was the only one to vote no, while other opposition parties walked out.

== Presidents of JRP ==
No.	Name	Photo	Took office	Left office
Preceding parties: Osaka Restoration Association (national wing) & Sunrise Party
1	Tōru Hashimoto		12 September 2012	17 November 2012
2	Shintaro Ishihara		17 November 2012	19 January 2013
3	Co-leadership: Shintaro Ishihara & / Tōru Hashimoto		19 January 2013	31 July 2014
4	Tōru Hashimoto		1 August 2014	22 September 2014
Successor parties: Innovation Party & Party for Future Generations

== Election results ==
=== House of Representatives ===
Election	Leader	Constituency			Party list			Total	Position	Status
Election	Leader	Votes	%	Seats	Votes	%	Seats	Total	Position	Status
2012	Shintaro Ishihara	6,942,353	11.64	14 / 300	12,262,228	20.50	40 / 180	54 / 480	2nd	Opposition

=== House of Councillors ===
Election	Leader	Constituency			Party list			Seats		Position	Status
Election	Leader	Votes	%	Seats	Votes	%	Seats	Election	Total	Position	Status
2013	Shintaro Ishihara	6,355,299	11.94	2 / 73	3,846,649	7.25	6 / 48	8 / 121	9 / 242	4th	Opposition

== See also ==
- Osaka Restoration Association
