= List of members of Nippon Kaigi =

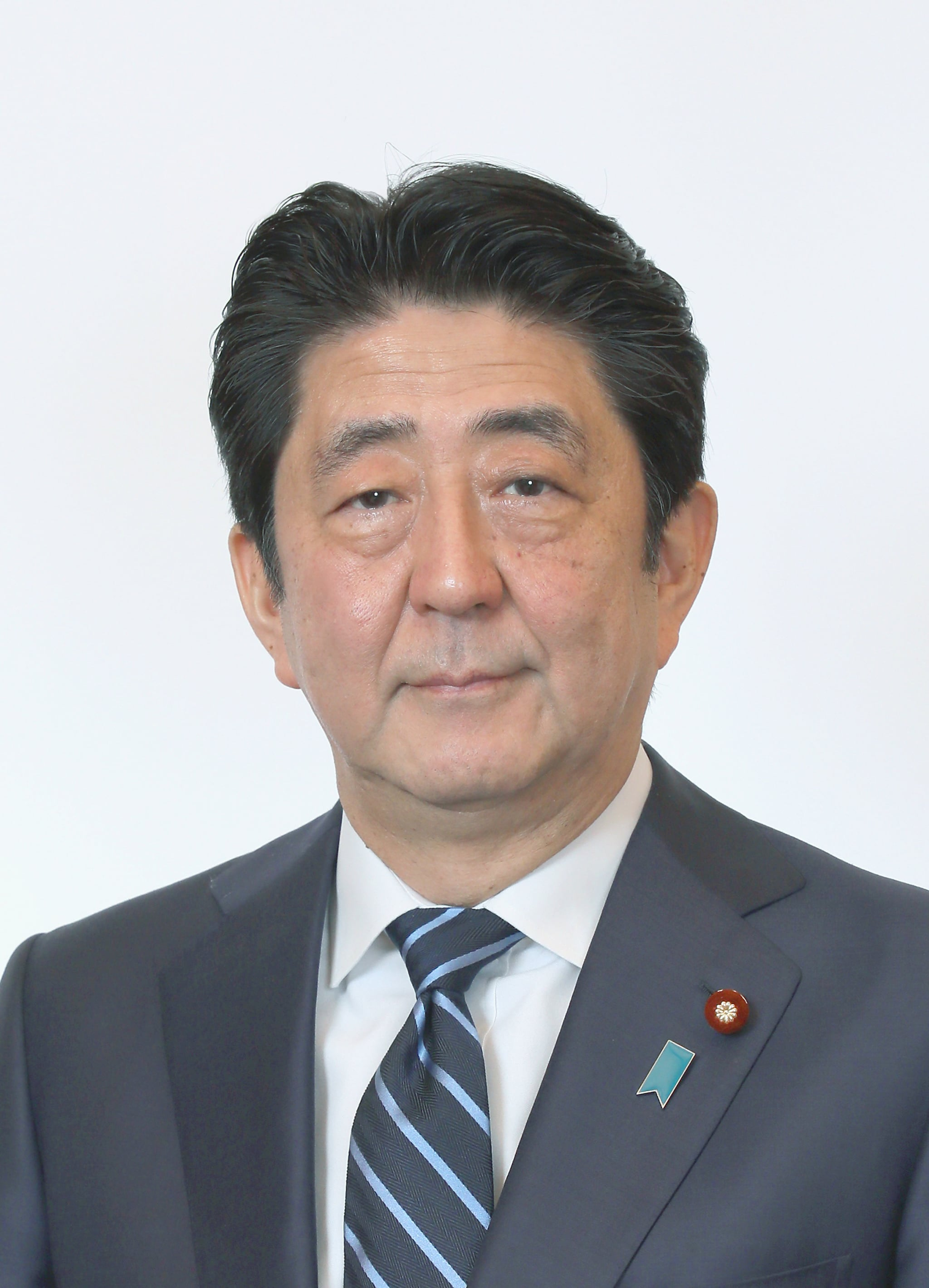
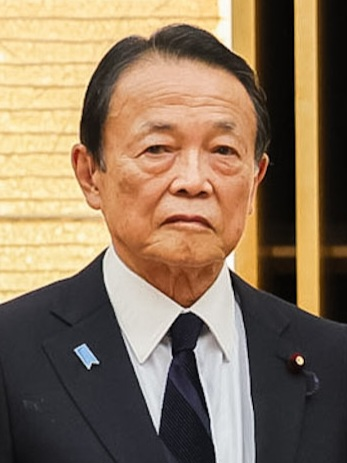
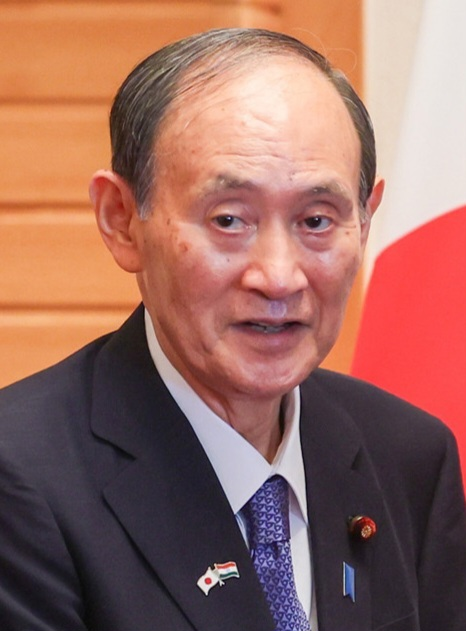
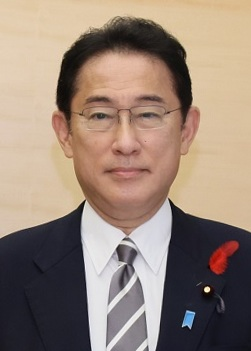
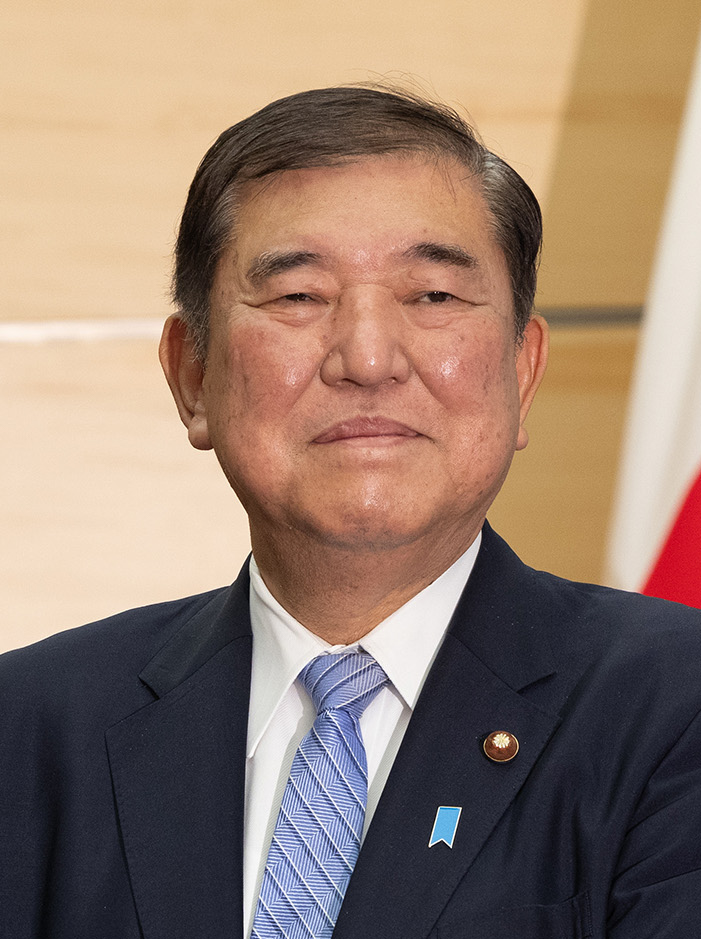
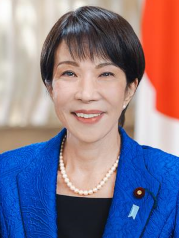
Six Prime Ministers have been members of Nippon Kaigi. They include:
- Top left: Shinzo Abe (2006–2007, 2012–2020)
- Top centre: Tarō Asō (2008–2009)
- Top right: Yoshihide Suga (2020–2021)
- Bottom left: Fumio Kishida (2021–2024)
- Bottom centre: Shigeru Ishiba (2024–2025)
- Bottom right: Sanae Takaichi (2025–present)

Among the members, former members, and members of affiliated organizations of the Nippon Kaigi ("Japan Conference") are lawmakers, cabinets ministers and a few prime ministers. (Note: Toshiro Mayuzumi is not included on this list. While intended as Nippon Kaigi's first chairman, he died in April 1997; seven weeks before the inaugural general meeting in May 1997.)

== Members and affiliates, by profile ==
=== Prime ministers ===
- Shinzō Abe, Liberal Democratic Party (2006–2007, 2012–2020)
- Tarō Asō, Liberal Democratic Party (2008–2009)
- Yoshihide Suga, Liberal Democratic Party (2020–2021)
- Fumio Kishida, Liberal Democratic Party (2021–2024)
- Shigeru Ishiba, Liberal Democratic Party (2024–2025)
- Sanae Takaichi, Liberal Democratic Party (2025–present)

=== Ministers ===
- Akira Amari, Liberal Democratic Party
- Haruko Arimura, Liberal Democratic Party
- Akinori Eto, Liberal Democratic Party
- Kazuhiro Haraguchi, Democratic Party of Japan
- Kunio Hatoyama, Liberal Democratic Party
- Takeo Hiranuma, Party for Future Generations
- Bunmei Ibuki, Liberal Democratic Party
- Masahiro Imamura, Liberal Democratic Party
- Tomomi Inada, Liberal Democratic Party
- Takeo Kawamura, Liberal Democratic Party
- Nobuo Kishi, Liberal Democratic Party
- Yuriko Koike, Liberal Democratic Party
- Kenji Kosaka, Liberal Democratic Party
- Fumio Kyūma, Liberal Democratic Party
- Seiji Maehara, Democratic Party of Japan
- Hirokazu Matsuno, Liberal Democratic Party
- Toshikatsu Matsuoka, Liberal Democratic Party
- Yoshio Mochizuki, Liberal Democratic Party
- Eisuke Mori, Liberal Democratic Party
- Satoshi Morimoto, Independent
- Shoichi Nakagawa, Liberal Democratic Party
- Hiroshi Nakai, Democratic Party of Japan
- Hirofumi Nakasone, Liberal Democratic Party
- Gen Nakatani, Liberal Democratic Party
- Nariaki Nakayama, Liberal Democratic Party, Japan Restoration Party
- Takeshi Noda, Liberal Democratic Party
- Fukushiro Nukaga, Liberal Democratic Party
- Tatsuo Ozawa, NFP～the Reform Club
- Itsunori Onodera, Liberal Democratic Party
- Hidehisa Otsuji, Liberal Democratic Party
- Hakubun Shimomura, Liberal Democratic Party
- Yoshitaka Shindō, Liberal Democratic Party
- Yasuhisa Shiozaki, Liberal Democratic Party
- Shun'ichi Suzuki, Liberal Democratic Party
- Wataru Takeshita, Liberal Democratic Party
- Sadakazu Tanigaki, Liberal Democratic Party
- Shunichi Yamaguchi, Liberal Democratic Party
- Eriko Yamatani, Liberal Democratic Party

=== Nippon Kaigi leaders ===
==== Honor presidents ====
- Toru Miyoshi – The third president, former Chief Justice of the Supreme Court of Japan

==== Presidents ====
- Koichi Tsukamoto (1997–1998) – also the founder of Wacoal
- Kosaku Inaba (1998–2001) – former president of Ishikawajima-Harima Heavy Industries Co., head of the Japan Chamber of Commerce and Industry
- Toru Miyoshi (2001–2015) – former Chief Justice of the Supreme Court of Japan
- Tadae Takubo (2015–2024) – Diplomatic critic, Professor Emeritus, Kyorin University

==== Vice-presidents ====
- Aiko Anzai – a vocalist and politician
- Ichiro Aisawa – former Senior Vice-Minister for Foreign Affairs – Diet member – Chairman, House of Representatives Rules and Administration Committee – Vice-President of the Japan Scout Parliamentary Association
- Shiro Odamura – President of MEISEISHA Co., Ltd, former Head teacher of Takushoku University, also head of the Friends of Lee Teng-hui Association
- Koichiro Ishii – former chairman, Bridgestone Cycle Corp.
- Keiichiro Kobori – Professor Emeritus, University of Tokyo
- Kenko Matsuki – politician
- Tsunekiyo Tanaka – President of Association of Shinto Shrines, Chief priest of Iwashimizu Hachimangū.

==== Advisors ====
The presence of Shinto chief priests, some with imperial blood, is consistent with Nippon Kaigi's aim to restore the Shinto god-like status of the Emperor of Japan.

- Michihisa Kitashirakawa – High Priest of the Ise Grand Shrine, and great-grandson of the Emperor Meiji
- Naotake Takatsukasa – Chief Priest of the Ise Grand Shrine, adopted child of princess Kazuko Takatsukasa
- Sadahiro Hattori – Honorary Chief Priest of the Iwazu Tenmangu Shrine
- Eshin Watanabe – Chief Priest of Enryaku-ji Temple, Supreme Priest of the Tendai Buddhist Denomination, Honorary President of the Japan Conference of Religious Representatives (JCRR)

==== Secretary-General ====
Yuzo Kabashima – Chairman of Nippon Kyogikai (Council of Japan)

==== Key person ====
Iwao Andoh – Teacher of New Thought Seicho-no-Ie ("House of Growth")

== Members and affiliates, by name ==
(In italics, already listed above)

=== A ===
- Shinzō Abe (1954–2022) (Prime Minister)
- Masashi Adachi (Liberal Democratic Party)
- Yoichi Anami (Liberal Democratic Party)
- Aiko Anzai (Vice President, Nippon Kaigi) – a vocalist and politician
- Jiro Aichi (Liberal Democratic Party)
- Ichiro Aisawa (Vice President, Nippon Kaigi) – former Senior Vice-Minister for Foreign Affairs – Diet member – Chairman, House of Representatives Rules and Administration Committee – Vice-President of the Japan Scout Parliamentary Association
- Masaaki Akaike (Liberal Democratic Party – member of the House of Representatives in the Diet)
- Kyotoku Akimoto (Representative, Shinsei Bukkyo – Buddhist sect – member of Nippon Kaigi representative committee)
- Tsukasa Akimoto (Liberal Democratic Party – member of the House of Councillors in the Diet)
- Akira Amari (Minister)
- Kazuhiko Aoki (Liberal Democratic Party)
- Kazuo Aoyagi (Executive director, Reiyūkai – member of Nippon Kaigi representative committee)
- Shuhei Aoyama (Liberal Democratic Party)
- Eiko Araki (Part of a delegation of 41 Nippon Kaigi members from Tokyo who went to Saipan in 2005)
- Haruko Arimura (Minister)
- Hiroshi Ando (Liberal Democratic Party)
- Tarō Asō (Vice Prime Minister, Minister of Finance)
- Toru Azuma (Nippon Ishin no Kai)

=== C ===
- Nobuaki Chosokabe (Chairman of the Sinseiren / Shinto Seiji Renmei Kokkai Giin Kondankai / Shinto Political League / Shinto Association of Spiritual Leadership / 神道政治連盟国会議員懇談会 – Chief Priest, Iyozuhikonomikoto Shrine – member of Nippon Kaigi representative committee)

=== D ===
- Tōru Doi (Liberal Democratic Party – member of the House of Representatives in the Diet)

=== E ===
- Yoshihiko Ebihara (Former Prime Minister's Office deputy director – Former member of the House of Councilors – Keidanren, military pension – member of Representative Committee of Nippon Kaigi)
- Takashi Endo (Nippon Ishin no Kai)
- Akinori Eto (Minister)
- Seiichi Eto (Liberal Democratic Party – member of the Diet)
- Seishiro Eto (Liberal Democratic Party)
- Taku Etō (Liberal Democratic Party – member of the House of Representatives in the Diet)
- Michio Ezaki (Former Editor in Chief, Sokoku to seinen (Fatherland and youth) author or co-author of 'Japan and Korea: Kindred Spirits for 2000 Years', 'The Alleged "Nanking Massacre"', 'Japan's Rebuttal to China's Forged Claims', 'The World Judges the Tokyo Trials', 'Anti-Japanese Networks Drag Japan into a Quagmire – Senior Fellow at Nippon Kaigi, policy research)

=== F ===
- Keiji Furuya (Liberal Democratic Party, a member of the Diet – National Public Safety Commissioner)

=== G ===
- Pema Gyalpo (Political scientist, first non-Japanese member)

=== H ===
- Koichi Hagiuda (Liberal Democratic Party – Diet member)
- Kazuhiro Haraguchi (Minister)
- Gaku Hashimoto (Liberal Democratic Party – member of the House of Representatives in the Diet)
- Seiko Hashimoto (Liberal Democratic Party - former member of the House of Councillors, President of the Tokyo 2020 Organizing Committee)
- Kunio Hatoyama (Minister)
- Sadahiro Hattori (Advisor, Nippon Kaigi)
- Motoo Hayashi (Liberal Democratic Party – member of the House of Representatives in the Diet)
- Takeo Hiranuma (Minister)
- Katsuei Hirasawa (Minister)

=== I ===
- Tatsunori Ibayashi (Liberal Democratic Party)
- Bunmei Ibuki (Minister)
- Takumi Ihara (Liberal Democratic Party)
- Kazuo Ijiri (Author, former Director of the Institute of Japanese Identity, Takushoku – Council Chairman, Japan Institute for National Fundamentals – member of Nippon Kaigi representative committee)
- Michitaka Ikeda (Liberal Democratic Party)
- Yoshitaka Ikeda (Liberal Democratic Party)
- Soichiro Imaeda (Liberal Democratic Party)
- Masahiro Imamura (Minister)
- Yuichi Imaoka, (head of the Yonago branches of Nippon Kaigi and the National Association for the Rescue of Japanese Kidnapped by North Korea)
- Hiroshi Imazu (Liberal Democratic Party)
- Kosaku Inaba (President, Nippon Kaigi)
- Tomomi Inada (Liberal Democratic Party – Diet member)
- Reiho Inayama (Chief priest of the Nenpou Shinkyou Buddhist Denomination – member of Nippon Kaigi representative committee)
- Hidetaka Inoue (Nippon Ishin no Kai)
- Shinji Inoue (Liberal Democratic Party – member of the House of Representatives in the Diet)
- Takahiro Inoue (Liberal Democratic Party)
- Yoshiyuki Inoue (Independent)
- Shigeru Ishiba (Minister, Prime minister)
- Hirotaka Ishihara (Liberal Democratic Party)
- Shintaro Ishihara, Japan Restoration Party (former Governor of Tokyo – Director, Japan Institute for National Fundamentals – member of Nippon Kaigi representative committee)
- Junichi Ishii (Liberal Democratic Party)
- Masahiro Ishii (Liberal Democratic Party)
- Koichiro Ishii (Vice President, Nippon Kaigi)
- Takashi Ishizeki (Democratic Party)
- Yoshihiko Isozaki (Liberal Democratic Party)
- Yosuke Isozaki (Liberal Democratic Party)
- Tadashi Itagaki (Liberal Democratic Party – the son of General Seishiro Itagaki – a Lower House Representative – "a leading figure of promoting prime ministers' official visits to the (Yasukuni shrine – member of Nippon Kaigi representative committee))
- Kenichi Itō (a political analyst and former diplomat – President & CEO of the Japan Forum on International Relations, Inc., Vice Chairman of the Worldwide Support for Development, President & CEO of the Council on East Asian Community, President & CEO of the Global Forum of Japan, Professor Emeritus of Aoyama Gakuin University, former Director of the First Southeast Asian Division in the Japanese Ministry of Foreign Affairs – member of Nippon Kaigi representative committee)
- Yoshitaka Ito (Liberal Democratic Party)
- Shigeki Iwai (Liberal Democratic Party – member, House of Councillors)
- Kazuchika Iwata (Liberal Democratic Party)
- Takeshi Iwaya (Liberal Democratic Party – member, House of Representatives in the Diet)

=== K ===
- Yasushi Kaneko (Liberal Democratic Party – member of the House of Representatives in the Diet)
- Hideaki Kase (a diplomatic critic, and the son of World War II diplomat Toshikazu Kase – Chairman of Society for the Dissemination of Historical Fact – member of Nippon Kaigi representative committee)
- Katsunobu Katō (Liberal Democratic Party – member of the House of Representatives in the Diet)
- Sato Kazuo (Professor Emeritus, Aoyama Gakuin University – International Law – member of Nippon Kaigi representative committee)
- Yoshio Keino (President, Japan Teachers' Association – Professor at Heisei International University, Faculty of Law, Law and Political Science – Board member of Kenpo Gakkai (The Constitutional Law Association), and of Nippon Kaigi)
- Minoru Kihara (Liberal Democratic Party – member of the House of Representatives in the Diet)
- Seiji Kihara (Liberal Democratic Party – member of the House of Representatives in the Diet)
- Yoshio Kimura (Liberal Democratic Party – member of the House of Representatives in the Diet)
- Nobuo Kishi (Minister – brother of Shinzō Abe and grandson of Nobusuke Kishi)
- Fumio Kishida (Prime Minister)
- Shigeo Kitamura (Liberal Democratic Party – member of the House of Representatives in the Diet)
- Yasumitsu Kiuchi (Commissioner General of the National Police Agency – Representative Committee, Nippon Kaigi – Father of Minoru Kiuchi, Parliamentary Vice-Minister of Foreign Affairs – member of Nippon Kaigi representative committee)
- Takeo Kawamura (Minister)
- Keiichiro Kobori (Vice President, Nippon Kaigi)
- Kazuo Kogushi (Chief Priest, Atsuta Shrine – member of Nippon Kaigi representative committee)
- Yuriko Koike (Minister)
- Kenji Kosaka (Minister)
- Kishō Kurokawa (1934–2007 – architect and one of the founders of the Metabolist Movement)
- Muneharu Kurozumi (Chief Patriarch of Kurozumikyō, a Shinto sect that worships the rising sun – member of Nippon Kaigi representative committee)
- Fumio Kyūma (Minister)

=== M ===
- Seiji Maehara (Minister)
- Hideki Makihara (Liberal Democratic Party – member of the House of Representatives in the Diet)
- Tamayo Marukawa (Liberal Democratic Party – member of the House of Representatives in the Diet, former Minister of State for the Tokyo Olympic and Paralympic Games)
- Tade Masanari ("the executive director of Nippon Kaigi Hiroshima and the son of an A-bomb victim")
- Jin Matsubara (Constitutional Democratic Party of Japan – member of the House of Representatives in the Diet)
- Rui Matsukawa (Liberal Democratic Party – member of the House of Representatives in the Diet)
- Shigefumi Matsuzawa (Nippon Ishin no Kai – member of the House of Councillors in the Diet)
- Kenko Matsuki (Vice President, Nippon Kaigi)
- Fumiaki Matsumoto (Liberal Democratic Party – member of the House of Representatives in the Diet)
- Yohei Matsumoto (Liberal Democratic Party – member of the House of Representatives in the Diet)
- Hirokazu Matsuno (Minister)
- Toshikatsu Matsuoka (Minister) (1945–2007)
- Kitashirakawa Michihisa (Advisor, Nippon Kaigi)
- Asahiko Mihara (Liberal Democratic Party – member of the House of Representatives in the Diet)
- Junko Mihara (Liberal Democratic Party – member of the House of Representatives in the Diet)
- Toru Miyoshi (President, Nippon Kaigi)
- Yoshio Mochizuki (Minister)
- Eisuke Mori (Minister)
- Satoshi Morimoto (Minister)

=== N ===
- Akihisa Nagashima (Democratic Party of Japan – member of the House of Representatives in the Diet)
- Tadayoshi Nagashima (Liberal Democratic Party – member of the House of Representatives in the Diet)
- Shoichi Nakagawa (Minister)
- Hiroshi Nakai (Minister)
- Hirokazu Nakaima (Former Governor of Okinawa)
- Hirofumi Nakasone (Minister)
- Gen Nakatani (Minister)
- Nariaki Nakayama (Minister)
- Yasuhide Nakayama (Liberal Democratic Party – member of the House of Representatives in the Diet)
- Kyoko Nishikawa (Liberal Democratic Party – Diet member)
- Shingo Nishimura (Independent – member of the House of Representatives in the Diet – ejected from Toru Hashimoto's party for saying that Japan is full of Korean prostitutes)
- Yasutoshi Nishimura (Liberal Democratic Party – member of the House of Representatives in the Diet)
- Takeshi Noda (Minister)
- Kotaro Nogami (Minister)
- Fukushiro Nukaga (Minister) – also former head of the Defense Agency

=== O ===
- Takao Ochi (Liberal Democratic Party, House of Representatives)
- Shiro Odamura (Vice President, Nippon Kaigi)
- Kiyoshi Odawara (Liberal Democratic Party, House of Representatives)
- Masanobu Ogura (Liberal Democratic Party, House of Representatives)
- Hideo Ohnishi (Liberal Democratic Party, House of Representatives)
- Hiroyuki Ohnishi (Liberal Democratic Party)
- Keitaro Ohno (Liberal Democratic Party)
- Fusae Ohta (House of Councilors, former Governor of Osaka)
- Satoshi Oie (Liberal Democratic Party)
- Yasuhiko Ōishi (1922–2014 – Economist, Professor Emeritus, University of Tokyo – member of Representative Committee of Nippon Kaigi)
- Hiroshi Okada (Liberal Democratic Party)
- Keishu Okada (the daughter of Yoshikazu Okada, who founded the Mahikari cult, she founded the Sukyo Mahikari cult, which states that Adolf Hitler and the Second World War had the blessing of the Creator God – member of Nippon Kaigi representative committee)
- Seiho Okano (Leader of the Gedatsu-kai cult – Chairman of Shinshuren, the Federation of New Religious Organizations of Japan – member of Nippon Kaigi representative committee)
- Shohei Okashita (Liberal Democratic Party)
- Hisahiko Okazaki (1930–2014 – diplomat, director of the Okazaki Institute)
- Kazuhide Okuma (Liberal Democratic Party)
- Shinsuke Okuno (Liberal Democratic Party)
- Asako Omi (Liberal Democratic Party of Japan - member of the House of Representatives)
- Makoto Oniki (Liberal Democratic Party – member of the House of Representatives at the Diet)
- Kiyoko Ono (former Olympic gymnast, Minister of State, chairman of National Safety Commission)
- Hiroo Onoda (1922–2014 – the Imperial Japanese Army intelligence officer who refused to surrender after World War II, hiding in the Philippines until 1974 – member of Nippon Kaigi representative committee)
- Itsunori Onodera (Minister)
- Toshitaka Ooka (Liberal Democratic Party)
- Hidehisa Otsuji (Minister) – member of Nippon Kaigi representative committee
- Tadamori Oshima (Liberal Democratic Party)
- Taku Otsuka (Liberal Democratic Party)
- Takashi Otsuka (Liberal Democratic Party)
- Yasuhiro Ozato (Liberal Democratic Party)
- Tatsuo Ozawa, NFP～the Reform Club

=== R ===
- Hirofumi Ryu (Democratic Party of Japan – member of the House of Representatives in the Diet)

=== S ===
- Shoichi Saeki (Professor Emeritus, University of Tokyo – literary critic – member of Nippon Kaigi representative committee)
- Tetsushi Sakamoto (Liberal Democratic Party – member of the House of Representatives in the Diet)
- Yoshitaka Sakurada (Liberal Democratic Party, a member of the House of Representatives in the Diet)
- Yoshiko Sakurai (Journalist, TV presenter, and writer – President, Japan Institute for National Fundamentals)
- Akiko Santo (Liberal Democratic Party – member of the House of Councillors in the Diet – former actress)
- Noritaka Sekiguchi (the Chairman of and the son of the founders of the cult Bussho Gonenkai Kyōdan – member of Nippon Kaigi representative committee)
- Masayuki Shibuki (Chairman, Kohken Co. Ltd – member of Nippon Kaigi representative committee)
- Atsushi Shima (Chief of Staff, Japanese Government Self Defense Force – General – member of Nippon Kaigi representative committee)
- Yoshiko Shima (Chairman, Asahi Photos News Inc. – member of Nippon Kaigi representative committee)
- Hakubun Shimomura (Minister)
- Yoshitaka Shindō (Minister)
- Sadanoyama Shinmatsu (actual name Shinmatsu Ichikawa – former sumo wrestler, yokozuna, and head of the Japan Sumo Association – member of Nippon Kaigi representative committee)
- Yasuhisa Shiozaki (Minister)
- Hiroyuki Sonoda (Liberal Democratic Party – member of the House of Representatives at the Diet)
- Tenkoko Sonoda (Liberal Democratic Party – member of the Diet – widow of former Foreign Minister Sunao Sonoda – member of Nippon Kaigi representative committee)
- Hansō Sōshitsu (the 15th in a series of Japanese tea masters of the Urasenke family – member of Nippon Kaigi representative committee)
- Yoshihide Suga (Minister and Prime Minister)
- Isshu Sugawara (Liberal Democratic Party – member of the House of Representatives in the Diet)
- Iwao Sumoge (President of Densho Engineering Co., Ltd – member of Nippon Kaigi representative committee)
- Shun'ichi Suzuki (Minister)

=== T ===
- Takemoto Tadao (Professor Emeritus, University of Tsukuba – religious, political and literary critic specialized in French literature – co-author of 'The Alleged "Nanking Massacre": Japan's Rebuttal to China's Forged Claims' – member of Nippon Kaigi representative committee)
- Sanae Takaichi (Minister, current Prime minister)
- Irie Takanori (Professor Emeritus, Meiji University – member of Nippon Kaigi representative committee)
- Harunobu Takashiro (Chief Priest, Ise Grand Shrine – member of Nippon Kaigi representative committee)
- Sangmu Takatsukasa (Naotake Takatsukasa) (Advisor, Nippon Kaigi)
- Kakuchō Take (Chief Priest, Hieizan Enryakuji / Enryaku-ji Tendai monastery – member of Nippon Kaigi representative committee)
- Wataru Takeshita (Minister)
- Ryota Takeda (Liberal Democratic Party – member of the House of Representatives in the Diet)
- Naokazu Takemoto (Liberal Democratic Party – member of the House of Representatives in the Diet)
- Sonkyo Takito (Takifuji Takashikyo) (1922–2010 – 105th Superintendent priest of Shitennoji Temple – member of Nippon Kaigi representative committee)
- Tadae Takubo (Professor Emeritus, Kyorin University – Vice President, Japan Institute for National Fundamentals – member of Nippon Kaigi representative committee)
- Toshio Tamogami (former Chief of Staff of Japan's Air Self-Defense Force)
- Norihisa Tamura (Liberal Democratic Party – Minister of Health, Labor and Welfare)
- Hiro Tanaka (Chief Priest, Meiji Jingu Shrine)
- Sadakazu Tanigaki (Minister)
- Tsunekiyo Tanaka (Vice President, Nippon Kaigi)
- Minoru Terada (Liberal Democratic Party – member of the House of Representatives in the Diet)
- Taizō Terashima (18th Chairman, Joint Staff Council, Japan Self-Defense Force – Chief of Staff, Japan Ground Self-Defense Force – Order of the Sacred Treasure, 2004 – member of Nippon Kaigi representative committee)
- Yasuhisa Tokugawa (Chief priest, Yasukuni Shrine – great-grandson of Tokugawa Yoshinobu, the last shōgun – member of Nippon Kaigi representative committee)
- Koichi Tsukamoto (President, Nippon Kaigi)

=== U ===
- Keiichiro Uchino (CEO of Uchino, a law firm – President of the Tokyo Nakano Branch of Nippon Kaigi – Organized a November 2013 party to celebrate the Shinzō Abe cabinet where the Imperial Rising Sun Flag was flown, the "Kimigayo" sung, and the pledge to "break away from the post-war regime" renewed.
- Kazuo Uemura (Institute of Japanese Culture and Nationality / Kokubunken – member of Nippon Kaigi representative committee)
- Kenichiro Ueno (Liberal Democratic Party – member of the House of Representatives in the Diet)
- Michiko Ueno (Liberal Democratic Party)
- Yasuto Urano (Nippon Ishin no Kai)
- Tadanobu Usami (President of UI Zensen Domei labor union – RENGO – member of the Representative Committee of Nippon Kaigi)
- Takashi Uto (Liberal Democratic Party)
- Tetsuhiko Utsunomiya (Chairman of Nikka Corp – member of Nippon Kaigi representative committee)

=== W ===
- Eshin Watanabe (Advisor, Nippon Kaigi)
- Shōichi Watanabe (English scholar known for his extreme positions)
- Yoshimi Watanabe (Your Party – member of the House of Representatives in the Diet)

=== Y ===
- Hiroshi Yamada (Secretary-General, Party for Future Generations – member of the Diet)
- Daishiro Yamagiwa (Liberal Democratic Party – member of the House of Representatives in the Diet)
- Shunichi Yamaguchi (Minister)
- Koichi Yamamoto (Liberal Democratic Party – member of the House of Representatives in the Diet)
- Tomohiro Yamamoto (Liberal Democratic Party – member of the House of Representatives in the Diet)
- Eriko Yamatani (Minister, chairperson of National Public Safety Committee)
- Masaaki Yamazaki (Liberal Democratic Party – member of the Diet)
- Kazuhiro Yoshida (Part of a delegation of 41 Nippon Kaigi members from Tokyo who went to Saipan in 2005)
- Teruki Yoshioka (Head of Nippon Kaigi Fukuoka branch)
