= Michitaro Watanabe =

Japanese politician (born 1982)

- 渡辺 美知太郎
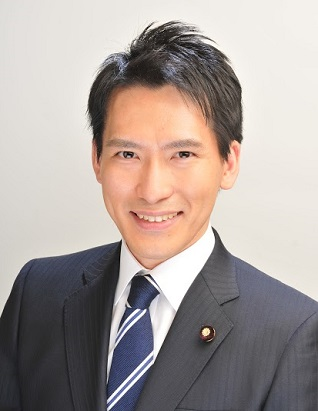
- Official portrait, 2018

Mayor of Nasushiobara
- Incumbent
- Assumed office 22 April 2019
- Preceded by: Hiroshi Kimijima

Member of the House of Councillors
- In office 29 July 2013 – 12 April 2019
- Constituency: National PR

Personal details
- Born: 28 December 1982 (age 43) Tokyo, Japan
- Party: Independent
- Other political affiliations: Your Party (until 2014)
- Relatives: Michio Watanabe (grandfather); Yoshimi Watanabe (uncle)
- Education: Keio University

Michitaro Watanabe (渡辺美知太郎, Watanabe Michitaro; born 28 December 1982) is a Japanese politician serving as mayor of Nasushiobara since 2019. From 2013 to 2019, he was a member of the House of Councillors. He is the grandson of Michio Watanabe and the nephew of Yoshimi Watanabe.
