= Saitama 1st district =

Constituency in Saitama Prefecture, Japan

- Parliamentary constituency for the Japanese House of Representatives
- Numbered map of Saitama Prefecture single-member districts
- Prefecture: Saitama
- Proportional District: Northern Kanto
- Electorate: 384,548

Current constituency
- Created: 1994
- Seats: One
- Party: Liberal Democratic
- Representative: Hideki Murai
- Municipalities: Midori-ku, Minuma, and Urawa-ku of Saitama City.

Saitama 1st district (埼玉県第1区, Saitama-ken dai-ikku or simply 埼玉1区, Saitama-ken ikku ) is a single-member constituency of the House of Representatives in the national Diet of Japan located in Saitama Prefecture.

== Areas covered ==
=== since 2022 ===
- Saitama City
  - Midori-ku
  - Minuma
  - Urawa-ku

=== 2017 - 2022 ===
- Saitama City
  - Midori-ku
  - Part of Minuma-ku
  - Urawa-ku
  - Iwatsuki-ku

=== 2013 - 2017 ===
- Saitama City
  - Midori-ku
  - Minuma-ku
  - Urawa-ku
  - Iwatsuki-ku

=== 2003 - 2013 ===
- Saitama City
  - Midori-ku
  - Minuma-ku
  - Urawa-ku
- Iwatsuki

=== 2002 - 2003 ===
- Part of Saitama City
- Iwatsuki

=== 1994 - 2002 ===
- Urawa
- Warabi

== List of representatives ==
Election	Representative	Party	Notes
1996	Hikaru Matsunaga	Liberal Democratic	
2000	Koichi Takemasa	Democratic	
2003	Koichi Takemasa	Democratic	
2005	Koichi Takemasa	Democratic	
2009	Koichi Takemasa	Democratic	
2012	Hideki Murai	Liberal Democratic	
2014	Hideki Murai	Liberal Democratic	
2017	Hideki Murai	Liberal Democratic	
2021	Hideki Murai	Liberal Democratic	
2024	Hideki Murai	Liberal Democratic	
2026	Hideki Murai	Liberal Democratic	

== Election results ==
=== 2026 ===
2026
Party	Candidate	Votes	%	±%
LDP	Hideki Murai	121,002	55.7	▲14.2
Centrist Reform	Koichi Takemasa	67,980	31.3	▼8.6
Sanseitō	Shirō Sugamata	21,329	9.8	
Independent	Kazuki Haneda	7,115	3.3	
Registered electors		387,337		
Turnout			57.30	▲2.55
LDP hold				

=== 2024 ===
2024
Party	Candidate	Votes	%	±%
Liberal Democratic (endorsed by Komeito)	Hideki Murai (incumbent)	85,347	41.46	▼6.12
CDP	Koichi Takemasa (elected in N. Kanto PR)	82,134	39.90	▲1.83
Innovation	Asanome Yoshihide	19,039	9.25	▼0.07
Communist	Yukiko Yano	15,106	7.34	New
NHK	Tokuji Nakajima	4,234	2.06	New
Majority		3,213	1.56	▼7.95
Registered electors		385,255		
Turnout		205,860	54.75	▼0.73
LDP hold				

=== 2021 ===
2021
Party	Candidate	Votes	%	±%
Liberal Democratic (endorsed by Komeito)	Hideki Murai (incumbent)	120,856	47.58	
CDP	Koichi Takemasa	96,690	38.07	New
Innovation	Gosuke Yoshimura	23,670	9.32	
Independent	Manami Sato	11,540	4.54	New
Independent	Tokuji Nakajima	1,234	0.49	New
Majority		24,166	9.51	
Registered electors		465,306		
Turnout			55.48	▲3.63
LDP hold				

=== 2017 ===
2017
Party	Candidate	Votes	%	±%
Liberal Democratic (endorsed by Komeito)	Hideki Murai (incumbent)	106,699	46.88	
Kibō no Tō	Koichi Takemasa (PR seat incumbent)	75,716	33.27	New
Communist	Megumi Toba	33,593	14.76	
Innovation	Kiyoto Kohiyama	11,577	5.09	New
Majority		30,983	13.61	
Registered electors		449,270		
Turnout			51.85	▼1.38
LDP hold				

=== 2014 ===
2014
Party	Candidate	Votes	%	±%
Liberal Democratic (endorsed by Komeito)	Hideki Murai (incumbent)	105,760	46.93	
Democratic	Koichi Takemasa (PR seat incumbent) (won PR seat)	82,857	36.77	
Communist	Toshio Matsumura	28,259	12.54	
Social Democratic	Sho Matsumoto	8,492	3.77	
Majority		22,903	10.16	
Registered electors		435,352		
Turnout			53.23	▼4.90
LDP hold				

=== 2012 ===
2012
Party	Candidate	Votes	%	±%
Liberal Democratic (endorsed by Komeito)	Hideki Murai	96,242	39.74	
Democratic (endorsed by PNP)	Koichi Takemasa (incumbent) (won PR seat)	76,583	31.62	
Your (endorsed by JRP)	Takayoshi Hiiro	42,451	17.53	New
Communist	Shinji Aoyagi	18,503	7.64	
Social Democratic	Yasumasa Kawakami	8,396	3.47	N/A
Majority		19,659	8.12	
Registered electors		428,119		
Turnout			58.13	▼7.18
LDP gain from Democratic				

=== 2009 ===
2009
Party	Candidate	Votes	%	±%
Democratic	Koichi Takemasa (incumbent)	163,973	60.91	
Liberal Democratic (endorsed by Komeito)	Zenjiro Kaneko (PR seat incumbent)	77,988	28.97	
Communist	Gaku Ito	23,623	8.78	
Happiness Realization	Hirotada Utsumi	3,615	1.34	New
Majority		85,985	31.94	
Registered electors		419,401		
Turnout			65.31	▲0.02
Democratic hold				

=== 2005 ===
2005
Party	Candidate	Votes	%	±%
Democratic	Koichi Takemasa (incumbent)	115,262	44.20	
Liberal Democratic	Zenjiro Kaneko (won PR seat)	112,340	43.08	N/A
Communist	Gaku Ito	19,319	7.41	
Social Democratic	Masayo Ikeda	13,869	5.32	
Majority		2,922	1.12	
Registered electors		405,970		
Turnout			65.29	▲11.73
Democratic hold				

=== 2003 ===
2003
Party	Candidate	Votes	%	±%
Democratic	Koichi Takemasa (incumbent)	117,587	56.27	
New Conservative	Zenjiro Kaneko (PR seat incumbent)	59,910	28.67	New
Communist	Gaku Ito	16,257	7.78	
Social Democratic	Takeo Amatatsu	8,960	4.29	
Party for New Deal	Setsuo Yamaguchi	6,237	2.98	New
Majority		57,677	27.60	
Turnout			53.56	▼4.61
Democratic hold				

=== 2000 ===
2000
Party	Candidate	Votes	%	±%
Democratic	Koichi Takemasa	105,783	42.65	New
Liberal Democratic	Hikaru Matsunaga (incumbent)	87,358	35.22	
Communist	Ryoji Yoshino	34,973	14.10	
Social Democratic	Takeo Amatatsu	19,887	8.02	New
Majority		18,425	7.43	
Turnout			58.17	▲3.77
Democratic gain from LDP				

=== 1996 ===
1996
Party	Candidate	Votes	%	±%
Liberal Democratic	Hikaru Matsunaga	85,109	38.96	New
New Frontier	Takujiro Hamada	79,930	36.59	New
Communist	Renzo Togashi	46,243	21.17	New
Liberal League	Satoshi Nakagōri	7,177	3.29	New
Majority		5,179	2.37	
Turnout			54.40	
LDP win (new seat)				
