= Hirokazu Matsuno =

Japanese politician (born 1962)

- 松野 博一
- Official portrait, 2021

Chief Cabinet Secretary
- In office 4 October 2021 – 14 December 2023
- Prime Minister: Fumio Kishida
- Preceded by: Katsunobu Katō
- Succeeded by: Yoshimasa Hayashi

Minister of Education, Culture, Sports, Science and Technology
- In office 3 August 2016 – 3 August 2017
- Prime Minister: Shinzō Abe
- Preceded by: Hiroshi Hase
- Succeeded by: Yoshimasa Hayashi

Member of the House of Representatives; from Southern Kanto
- Incumbent
- Assumed office 26 June 2000
- Preceded by: Masayuki Okajima
- Constituency: See list: Chiba 3rd (2000–2003); PR block (2003–2005); Chiba 3rd (2005–2009); PR block (2009–2012); Chiba 3rd (2012–present)

Personal details
- Born: 13 September 1962 (age 64) Kisarazu, Chiba, Japan
- Party: Liberal Democratic
- Education: Waseda University

Hirokazu Matsuno (松野 博一, Matsuno Hirokazu; born 13 September 1962) is a Japanese politician who served as the Chief Cabinet Secretary from October 2021 until December 2023. He is serving in the House of Representatives as a member of the Liberal Democratic Party.

Matsuno does not believe that the 1923 Kantō Massacre occurred, and does not believe that the World War II era comfort women were coerced.

== Career ==
A native of Kisarazu, Chiba and graduate of Waseda University, Matsuno originally wanted to work in the film industry but instead took a job in advertising at Lion Corporation. He was elected to the House of Representatives for the first time in 2000 after an unsuccessful run in 1996.

In the 3 August 2016 reshuffle, Matsuno joined the Shinzō Abe cabinet as Minister of education. Matsuno became the Chief Cabinet Secretary in the Cabinet of Japan under Prime Minister Fumio Kishida.This role’s responsibilities include overseeing general affairs that pertain to the Cabinet and Security Council of Japan, as well as the collection of information concerning the important policies of the cabinet, as well as others.

Matsuno held three other ministry head positions simultaneously whilst being the Chief Cabinet Secretary for the Kishida Cabinet. Matsuno’s additional positions included the Minister in charge of promoting vaccinations, the Minister in Charge of Mitigating the Impact of U.S. forces in Okinawa, and the Minister in charge of the abduction issue. During his time as the Minister in Charge of Mitigating the Impact of U.S. forces in Okinawa, Matsuno visited the Sakishima Islands within the Okinawa prefecture in preparation for the worst in July 2023. There, Matsuno discussed and agreed with local governments on the need for more defense planning and infrastructure, such as the need for shelters and the upgrading of airport and seaport functions for evacuations. Matsuno is the first Chief Cabinet Secretary ever to visit the Sakishima Islands. In his occupation of the position of the Minister in Charge of the Abduction Issue, He addressed the United Nations Online Symposium on 29 July 2023, regarding the issue.

Matsuno was one of several cabinet ministers who resigned from their posts in December 2023 amid allegations of a slush fund involving members of the LDP.

In February 2026, Matsuno became chief of the LDP Organisation and Movement Headquarters.

== Controversy ==
Affiliated to the openly revisionist lobby Nippon Kaigi, along with most members of the Abe cabinet, Matsuno denies the existence of the Imperial Japan sex slavery system known under the euphemism 'Comfort women', and in 2014 demanded the revision of the Kono and Murayama statements, considered as landmark declarations from Japanese governments towards the recognition of war crimes.

Matsuno is also a member of the following right-wing Diet groups:

- Conference of parliamentarians on the Shinto Association of Spiritual Leadership (神道政治連盟国会議員懇談会 - Shinto Seiji Renmei Kokkai Giin Kondankai) - NB: SAS a.k.a. Sinseiren, Shinto Political League
- Japan Rebirth (創生「日本」- Sosei Nippon)

Matsuno has expressed doubt that the 1923 Kantō Massacre occurred. In a 2023 press conference, he stated that there was insufficient evidence for the event, directly contradicting a 2009 expert panel of the government's Central Disaster Management Council. Matsuno disavowed the conclusions found by that panel.

=== Slush fund scandal ===
In November 2023 Japanese prosecutors began voluntarily questioning members of several factions of the LDP, including the largest faction of which Matsuno was a member, on suspicion of receiving slush fund money in the form of revenues from fundraising parties totaling over ¥100 million that had not been reported in political funding statements. On December 8, 2023, it was reported that Matsuno allegedly failed to declare over ¥10 million in income over the previous five years. The following day, multiple news outlets reported that Prime Minister Fumio Kishida was preparing to replace Matsuno as Chief Cabinet Secretary. On December 12 the lower house, of which the LDP holds a majority, voted down a motion of no confidence against Matsuno that had been put forward by the opposing Constitutional Democratic Party of Japan. Matsuno submitted his resignation from the cabinet on December 14, 2023, along with several other LDP officials.

Political offices
Preceded by Hiroshi Hase	Minister of Education, Culture, Sports, Science and Technology; 2016–2017	Succeeded by Yoshimasa Hayashi
Preceded by Katsunobu Katō	Chief Cabinet Secretary; 2021–2023	Succeeded by Yoshimasa Hayashi
Party political offices
Preceded by Yoshitaka Shindō	Chief of the Organisation and Movement Headquarters, Liberal Democratic Party; 2026-present	Incumbent
