= Hideki Murai =

Japanese politician (born 1980)

- 村井 英樹
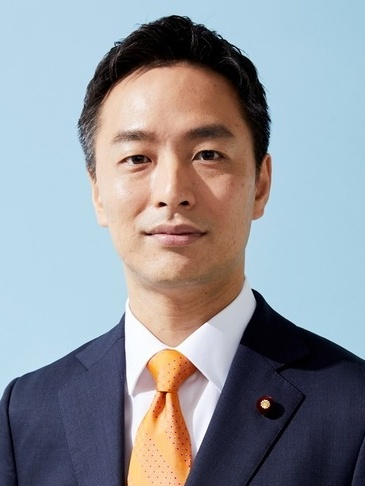
- Official portrait, 2021

Deputy Chief Cabinet Secretary (Political affairs, House of Representatives)
- In office 13 September 2023 – 1 October 2024
- Prime Minister: Fumio Kishida
- Preceded by: Seiji Kihara
- Succeeded by: Keiichiro Tachibana

Member of the House of Representatives
- Incumbent
- Assumed office 16 December 2012
- Preceded by: Koichi Takemasa
- Constituency: Saitama 1st

Personal details
- Born: 14 May 1980 (age 46) Urawa, Saitama, Japan
- Party: Liberal Democratic
- Education: University of Tokyo

Hideki Murai (村井 英樹, Murai Hideki; born 14 May 1980) is a Japanese politician who serves as chairman of the Diet Affairs Committee in the Liberal Democratic Party since 2026. He was Deputy Chief Cabinet Secretary from 2023 to 2024. He has represented Saitama 1st district in the House of Representatives since 2012.

Born in Saitama Prefecture and educated at the University of Tokyo, Murai was an official in the Ministry of Finance before entering politics.

== Biography ==
Hideki Murai was born on 14 May 1980 in Urawa, Saitama Prefecture. After attending Kaijo Academy, he studied at the University of Tokyo. Initially a science major, he switched to study international politics, and joined the Ministry of Finance after graduating in 2003. Murai was involved in FTA negotiations and tax administration and was also seconded to the Ministry of Agriculture, Forestry and Fisheries. While in the Ministry he attended Harvard University and graduated in 2010. Murai left the ministry the following year and applied to become a candidate for the Liberal Democratic Party in the upcoming election.

Murai was elected as the LDP candidate for Saitama 1st district in the 2012 House of Representatives election, in which the LDP regained power. Murai joined the Kōchikai and became a close aide to its leader Fumio Kishida. In 2021, Murai headed the ruling Liberal Democratic Party's panel on digital currencies.

After Fumio Kishida became prime minister, he appointed Murai as Special Adviser to the Prime Minister for Domestic Economic and other special issues. In the September 2023 reshuffle he was promoted to Deputy Chief Cabinet Secretary. He stepped down along with the cabinet in October 2024.

After the end of the Kishida cabinet, Murai served as first deputy chairman of the LDP Diet Affairs Committee. In September 2026, he was made chairman of the Diet Affairs Committee.
