= Michio Watanabe =

Japanese politician (1923–1995)

- 渡辺 美智雄
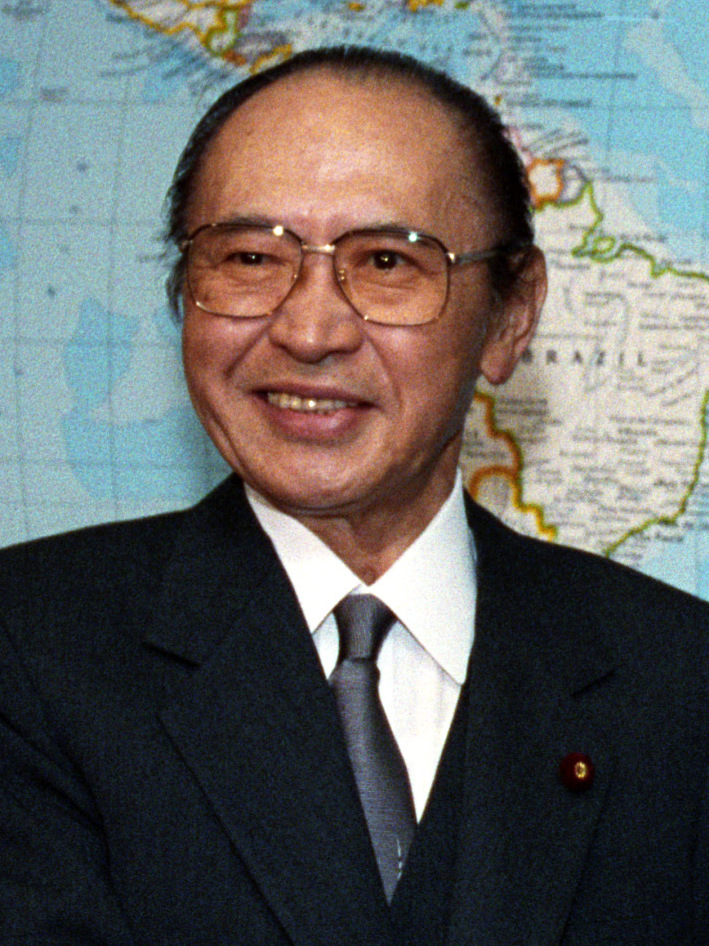
- Watanabe in 1993

Deputy Prime Minister of Japan
- In office 5 November 1991 – 7 April 1993
- Prime Minister: Kiichi Miyazawa
- Preceded by: Kiichi Miyazawa (1988)
- Succeeded by: Masaharu Gotoda
Ministerial offices
Minister for Foreign Affairs
In office 5 November 1991 – 7 April 1993
Prime Minister	Kiichi Miyazawa
Preceded by	Taro Nakayama
Succeeded by	Kabun Mutō
Minister of International Trade and Industry
In office 28 December 1985 – 22 July 1986
Prime Minister	Yasuhiro Nakasone
Preceded by	Keijiro Murata
Succeeded by	Hajime Tamura
Minister of Finance
In office 17 July 1980 – 17 November 1982
Prime Minister	Zenkō Suzuki
Preceded by	Noboru Takeshita
Succeeded by	Noboru Takeshita
Minister of Agriculture, Forestry and Fisheries
In office 7 December 1978 – 9 November 1979
Prime Minister	Masayoshi Ōhira
Preceded by	Ichiro Nakagawa
Succeeded by	Kabun Mutō
Minister of Health and Welfare
In office 24 December 1976 – 28 November 1977
Prime Minister	Takeo Fukuda
Preceded by	Takashi Hayakawa
Succeeded by	Tatsuo Ozawa

Member of the House of Representatives
- In office 22 November 1963 – 15 September 1995
- Preceded by: Giichi Ozeki
- Succeeded by: Constituency abolished (1996)
- Constituency: Tochigi 1st

Personal details
- Born: 28 July 1923 Ōtawara, Tochigi, Japan
- Died: 15 September 1995 (aged 72) Shinjuku, Tokyo, Japan
- Cause of death: Heart failure
- Party: Liberal Democratic (1955–1995)
- Other political affiliations: Liberal (1950–1955)
- Spouse: Sumiko Nagayama
- Children: Yoshimi Watanabe; Michiaki Watanabe
- Relatives: Michitaro Watanabe (grandson)
- Education: Tokyo College of Commerce

Michio Watanabe (渡辺 美智雄, Watanabe Michio; 28 July 1923 – 15 September 1995) was a Japanese political figure. He was born in Ōtawara, Tochigi and graduated from the Tokyo College of Commerce (now Hitotsubashi University) in 1942. He worked as a reporter for the Yomiuri Shimbun, a certified tax accountant, and a member of Tochigi prefectural assembly before serving as a member of House of Representatives of Japan.

== Political career ==
Watanabe was a member of Seiran-kai, a conservative faction within the LDP, from 1973 to 1976. He later served as Health Minister from 1976 to 1977, Minister of Agriculture and Forestry from 1978 to 1979, and Minister of Finance from 1980 to 1982. He served as Deputy Prime Minister of Japan and Minister for Foreign Affairs from 1991 to 1993, and made unsuccessful bids for the presidency of the Liberal Democratic Party in 1991 and 1993. He gained some international notoriety for stating in 1988 that African Americans had "no qualms about not paying their bills," and for stating in 1995 that the Japanese annexation of Korea was done with Korea's consent.

Although he was ideologically opposed to communist China and favored Taiwan, he made efforts as Deputy Prime Minister to facilitate diplomacy between China and Japan in the wake of the 1989 Tiananmen Square protests and massacre, developing a relationship with the Chinese ambassador to Japan. He visited China for a meeting with foreign minister Qian Qichen in 1992, and the dialogue during this visit paved the way for Emperor Akihito to visit China later that year.

He was hospitalized for gallstones in 1992, but rumors of a more serious illness spread shortly thereafter, and he resigned for health reasons in 1993. After leading a Japanese delegation to North Korea in March 1995, he died from heart failure in September 1995. His eldest son, Yoshimi Watanabe, inherited his Diet seat and serves as the leader of Your Party. His grandson Michitaro Watanabe (the eldest son of his second son Michiaki Watanabe) is a member of the House of Councillors.

Political offices
Preceded by Takashi Harakawa	Minister of Health and Welfare; 1976–1977	Succeeded by Tatsuo Ozawa
Preceded by Ichiro Nakagawa	Minister of Agriculture, Forestry and Fisheries; 1978–1979	Succeeded by Kabun Mutō
Preceded by Noboru Takeshita	Minister for Finance of Japan; 1980–1982	Succeeded by Noboru Takeshita
Preceded by Keijirō Murata	Minister of International Trade and Industry; 1985–1986	Succeeded by Hajime Tamura
Preceded by Taro Nakayama	Minister for Foreign Affairs of Japan; 1991–1993	Succeeded by Kabun Mutō
Preceded by Kiichi Miyazawa	Deputy Prime Minister of Japan; 1991–1993	Succeeded by Masaharu Gotōda
House of Representatives (Japan)
Preceded by Yoshimasa Sakamura	Chair, Committee on Cabinet of the House of Representatives; 1976	Succeeded by Keijiro Shoji
Party political offices
Preceded by Masayoshi Ito	Chair, Policy Research Council of the Liberal Democratic Party; 1987–1989	Succeeded by Keijiro Murata
Preceded by Yoshio Sakurauchi	Head of Seisaku Kagaku Kenkyūkai; 1990–1995	Succeeded by Yasuhiro Nakasone; Interim
