= Hikaru Matsunaga =

Japanese politician (1928–2022)

- 松永 光
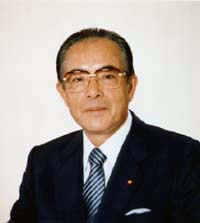
- Official portrait, 1998

Minister of Finance
- In office 27 January 1998 – 30 July 1998
- Prime Minister: Ryutaro Hashimoto
- Preceded by: Hiroshi Mitsuzuka
- Succeeded by: Kiichi Miyazawa

Minister of International Trade and Industry
- In office 9 August 1989 – 28 February 1990
- Prime Minister: Toshiki Kaifu
- Preceded by: Seiroku Kajiyama
- Succeeded by: Kabun Mutō

Minister of Education
- In office 1 November 1984 – 28 December 1985
- Prime Minister: Yasuhiro Nakasone
- Preceded by: Yoshirō Mori
- Succeeded by: Toshiki Kaifu

Member of the House of Representatives
- In office 27 December 1969 – 2 June 2000
- Preceded by: Yūji Tadamatsu
- Succeeded by: Koichi Takemasa
- Constituency: Former Saitama 1st (1969–1996); Saitama 1st (1996–2000)

Personal details
- Born: 23 November 1928 Minamikushiyama, Nagasaki, Japan
- Died: 11 October 2022 (aged 93) Saitama City, Saitama, Japan
- Party: Liberal Democratic
- Education: Waseda University

Hikaru Matsunaga (松永 光, Matsunaga Hikaru; 23 November 1928 – 11 October 2022) was a Japanese politician of the Liberal Democratic Party (LDP) who briefly served as the Minister of Finance from 27 January to 30 July 1998.

== Early life and education ==
Matsunaga was born on 23 November 1928. He is a graduate of Waseda University's law school.

== Career ==
Matsunaga was an attorney and prosecutor. He began his career as a public prosecutor in southern regions of Japan in the 1950s. Later he became a member of the LDP, a member of the Seirankai. Matsunaga was education minister in the mid-1980s. He served as minister of international trade and industry. He was appointed by Prime Minister Toshiki Kaifu to this post on 9 August 1989.

Then he was appointed by Prime Minister Ryutaro Hashimoto as the minister of finance on 27 January 1998. Matsunaga replaced Hiroshi Mitsuzuka as finance minister. Mitsuzuka was forced to resign due to the corrupt behaviour of the officials at the ministry. In April 1998, Matsunaga reported that 112 ministry officials would be punished due to their excessive entertainment from banks, brokerage firms and insurers under their supervision. Matsunaga's term as finance minister was short lived, and he resigned on 30 July 1998, replaced by Kiichi Miyazawa, another veteran LDP politician.

In addition to these cabinet roles, Matsunaga held the following positions in the Diet: Chairman of the lower house budget committee until 1998, director of the Diet education committee and vice-chairman of the PARC education division. He lost his seat in the lower house election on 25 June 2000.

== Death ==
Matsunaga died on 11 October 2022, at the age of 93.
