= Gifu 3rd district =

Legislative district of Japan

Gifu 3rd District
- Parliamentary constituency for the Japanese House of Representatives
- Numbered map of Gifu Prefecture single-member districts
- Prefecture: Gifu
- Proportional District: Tōkai
- Electorate: 411,722

Current constituency
- Created: 1994
- Seats: One
- Party: Liberal Democratic
- Representative: Yoji Muto
- Municipalities: Hashima, Kakamigahara, Mino, Mizuho, Motosu, Seki, Yamagata, Hashima District and Motosu District

Gifu 3rd district (岐阜県第3区, Gifu-ken dai-sanku or simply 岐阜3区, Gifu-sanku) is a single-member constituency of the House of Representatives in the national Diet of Japan located in Gifu Prefecture.

== List of representatives ==
| Election | Representative | Party | Notes |
|---|---|---|---|
| 1996 | Kabun Mutō | Liberal Democratic | |
| 2000 | Kabun Mutō | Liberal Democratic | |
| 2003 | Kabun Mutō | Liberal Democratic | |
| 2005 | Yoji Muto | Liberal Democratic | |
| 2009 | Yasuhiro Sonoda | Democratic | |
| 2012 | Yoji Muto | Liberal Democratic | |
| 2014 | Yoji Muto | Liberal Democratic | |
| 2017 | Yoji Muto | Liberal Democratic | |
| 2021 | Yoji Muto | Liberal Democratic | |
| 2024 | Yoji Muto | Liberal Democratic | |
| 2026 | Yoji Muto | Liberal Democratic | |

== Election results ==
2026
| Party | Candidate | Votes | % | ±% |
|---|---|---|---|---|
| LDP | Yoji Muto | 118,346 | 53.4 | ▲6.6 |
| DPP | Akihiro Senda | 51,021 | 23 | ▼7.4 |
| Reiwa | Naoto Sakaguchi | 28,872 | 13 | ▼9.8 |
| Sanseitō | Keisuke Ito (elected in PR block) | 23,204 | 10.5 | |
| Turnout | | 221,443 | 56.60 | ▲3.43 |
| LDP hold | | | | |

2024
| Party | Candidate | Votes | % | ±% |
|---|---|---|---|---|
| LDP | Yoji Muto | 98,370 | 46.8 | ▼11.8 |
| DPP | Akihiro Senda(elected in Tōkai PR block) | 64,039 | 30.4 | |
| Reiwa | Naoto Sakaguchi (elected in Tōkai PR block) | 48,002 | 22.8 | |
| Turnout | | | 53.17 | ▼1.38 |
| LDP hold | | | | |

2021
| Party | Candidate | Votes | % | ±% |
|---|---|---|---|---|
| Liberal Democratic | Yoji Muto (Incumbent) | 132,357 | 58.57 | |
| CDP | Naoto Sakaguchi | 93,616 | 41.43 | New |
| Registered electors | | 422,993 | | |
| Turnout | | | 66.37 | ▲1.01 |
| LDP hold | | | | |

2017
| Party | Candidate | Votes | % | ±% |
|---|---|---|---|---|
| Liberal Democratic | Yoji Muto | 127,308 | 56.88 | |
| Kibō no Tō | Naoto Sakaguchi | 68,404 | 30.56 | New |
| Communist | Satoshi Inoue | 28,093 | 12.55 | |
| Registered electors | | 426,163 | | |
| Turnout | | | 53.94 | ▲3.28 |
| LDP hold | | | | |
