= Chiba 3rd district =

Electoral constituency in Chiba Prefecture, Japan

- Parliamentary constituency for the Japanese House of Representatives
- Numbered map of the Chiba Prefecture single seats
- Prefecture: Chiba
- Proportional District: Southern Kanto
- Electorate: 333,990

Current constituency
- Created: 1994
- Seats: One
- Party: LDP
- Representatives: Hirokazu Matsuno
- Municipalities: Midori-ku of Chiba, Ichihara

Chiba 3rd district (千葉県第3区, Chiba-ken dai-sanku or simply 千葉3区, Chiba-sanku) is a single-member constituency of the House of Representatives in the national Diet of Japan located in Chiba Prefecture.

== Areas covered ==
=== Since 2002 ===
- Part of Chiba city
  - Midori-ku
- Ichihara

=== 1994 - 2002 ===
- Part of Chiba city
  - Midori-ku
  - Wakaba-ku
- Ichihara

== List of representatives ==
Election	Representative	Party	Notes
1996	Masayuki Okajima	New Frontier	
1996	Masayuki Okajima	Liberal	
1996	Masayuki Okajima	New Conservative	
2000	Hirokazu Matsuno	LDP	
2003	Kazumasa Okajima	Democratic	
2005	Hirokazu Matsuno	LDP	
2009	Kazumasa Okajima	Democratic	
2009	Kazumasa Okajima	PLF	
2009	Kazumasa Okajima	Tomorrow	
2012	Hirokazu Matsuno	LDP	
2014	Hirokazu Matsuno	LDP	
2017	Hirokazu Matsuno	LDP	
2021	Hirokazu Matsuno	LDP	
2024	Hirokazu Matsuno	LDP	
2026	Hirokazu Matsuno	LDP	

== Election results ==
=== 2026 ===
2026
Party	Candidate	Votes	%	±%
LDP	Hirokazu Matsuno	86,687	52.0	▲11.8
Centrist Reform	Kazumasa Okajima	48,689	29.2	▼10.0
Sanseitō	Masayuki Yamamoto	22,750	13.6	
JCP	Kumiko Watanabe	8,591	5.2	▼0.5
Registered electors		331,011		
Turnout			51.64	▲0.88
LDP hold				

=== 2024 ===
2024
Party	Candidate	Votes	%	±%
LDP	Hirokazu Matsuno (Incumbent)	67,308	41.17	▼20.70
CDP	Kazumasa Okajima (Won PR seat)	64,169	39.25	▲1.12
Independent	Yūya Ōsuki	22,717	13.89	New
JCP	Kazuo Kato	9,297	5.69	N/A
Majority		3,139	1.92	
Registered electors		332,979		
Turnout			50.76	▼1.60
LDP hold				

=== 2021 ===
2021
Party	Candidate	Votes	%	±%
LDP	Hirokazu Matsuno (Incumbent)	106,500	61.87	▲8.60
CDP	Kazumasa Okajima	65,627	38.13	New
Majority		40,873	23.74	
Registered electors		336,241		
Turnout			52.36	▲3.76
LDP hold				

=== 2017 ===
2017
Party	Candidate	Votes	%	±%
LDP	Hirokazu Matsuno (Incumbent)	85,461	53.27	▼0.10
CDP	Kazumasa Okajima (Won PR seat)	52,018	32.42	New
Kibō no Tō	Mari Kushibuchi	22,962	14.31	New
Majority		33,443	20.85	
Registered electors		336,797		
Turnout			48.60	▼1.71
LDP hold				

=== 2014 ===
2014
Party	Candidate	Votes	%	±%
LDP	Hirokazu Matsuno (Incumbent)	85,277	53.37	▲9.13
People's Life	Kazumasa Okajima	30,238	18.92	New
Democratic	Asuka Aoyama	29,656	18.56	▲2.68
JCP	Yohei Kabasawa	14,611	9.15	▲4.05
Majority		55,039	34.45	
Registered electors		327,236		
Turnout			50.31	▼7.45
LDP hold				

=== 2012 ===
2012
Party	Candidate	Votes	%	±%
LDP	Hirokazu Matsuno	80,710	44.24	▲1.78
Tomorrow	Kazumasa Okajima (Incumbent)	31,161	17.08	New
Restoration	Takashi Kobayashi	30,565	16.75	New
Democratic	Asuka Aoyama	28,979	15.88	▼39.58
JCP	Tadashi Ishikawa	9,298	5.10	N/A
Independent	Yukiko Inoue	1,723	0.95	New
Majority		49,549	27.16	
Registered electors		325,289		
Turnout			57.76	▼6.81
LDP gain from Tomorrow				

=== 2009 ===
2009
Party	Candidate	Votes	%	±%
Democratic	Kazumasa Okajima	112,035	55.46	▲13.57
LDP	Hirokazu Matsuno (Incumbent) (Won PR seat)	85,777	42.46	▼10.78
Happiness Realization	Yūzō Furukawa	4,210	2.08	New
Majority		26,258	13.00	
Registered electors		320,113		
Turnout			64.57	▼2.29
Democratic gain from LDP				

=== 2005 ===
2005
Party	Candidate	Votes	%	±%
LDP	Hirokazu Matsuno	108,937	53.24	▲5.94
Democratic	Kazumasa Okajima (Incumbent)	85,707	41.89	▼5.92
JCP	Mitsumasa Konno	9,957	4.87	▼0.02
Majority		23,230	11.35	
Registered electors		310,927		
Turnout			66.86	▲6.93
LDP gain from Democratic				

=== 2003 ===
2003
Party	Candidate	Votes	%	±%
Democratic	Kazumasa Okajima	85,610	47.81	▲25.77
LDP	Hirokazu Matsuno (Incumbent) (Won PR seat)	84,693	47.30	▲8.29
JCP	Mitsumasa Konno	8,768	4.89	▼6.26
Majority		917	0.51	
Registered electors		305,727		
Turnout			59.93	▼0.61
Democratic gain from LDP				

=== 2000 ===
2000
Party	Candidate	Votes	%	±%
LDP	Hirokazu Matsuno	95,311	39.01	▲4.56
New Conservative	Masayuki Okajima (Incumbent)	64,182	26.27	New
Democratic	Keiji Takeuchi	53,862	22.04	New
JCP	Yasuyo Kurosu	27,248	11.15	▼3.28
Liberal League	Seigō Fujino	3,725	1.53	▲0.69
Majority		31,129	12.74	
Registered electors		414,880		
Turnout			60.54	
LDP gain from New Conservative				

=== 1996 ===
1996
Party	Candidate	Votes	%	±%
New Frontier	Masayuki Okajima	84,846	39.90	New
LDP	Hirokazu Matsuno	73,254	34.45	New
JCP	Michiko Chiba	30,691	14.43	New
Democratic	Keiji Takeuchi	22,068	10.38	New
Liberal League	Mitsumoto Higashi	1,765	0.84	New
Majority		11,592	5.45	
Registered electors				
Turnout				
New Frontier win (new seat)				
