= Kabun Mutō =

Japanese politician (1926–2009)

- 武藤 嘉文
- Official portrait, 1996

Director-General of the Management and Coordination Agency
- In office 7 November 1996 – 11 September 1997
- Prime Minister: Ryutaro Hashimoto
- Preceded by: Sekisuke Nakanishi
- Succeeded by: Takayuki Satō

Minister for Foreign Affairs
- In office 7 April 1993 – 9 August 1993
- Prime Minister: Kiichi Miyazawa
- Preceded by: Michio Watanabe
- Succeeded by: Tsutomu Hata

Minister of International Trade and Industry
- In office 28 February 1990 – 29 December 1990
- Prime Minister: Toshiki Kaifu
- Preceded by: Hikaru Matsunaga
- Succeeded by: Eiichi Nakao

Minister of Agriculture, Forestry and Fisheries
- In office 9 November 1979 – 17 July 1980
- Prime Minister: Masayoshi Ōhira; Masayoshi Ito (acting)
- Preceded by: Michio Watanabe
- Succeeded by: Takao Kameoka

Member of the House of Representatives
- In office 30 January 1967 – 8 August 2005
- Preceded by: Shigenobu Takahashi
- Succeeded by: Yoji Muto
- Constituency: Gifu 1st (1967–1996); Gifu 3rd (1996–2005)

Personal details
- Born: 18 November 1926 Kakamigahara, Gifu, Japan
- Died: 4 November 2009 (aged 82) Tokyo, Japan
- Party: Liberal Democratic
- Children: Yoji Muto
- Parent: Kaichi Muto (father)
- Education: Kyoto University

Kabun Mutō (武藤 嘉文, Mutō Kabun; 18 November 1926 – 4 November 2009) was a Japanese politician who served as the Minister for Foreign Affairs for a brief period in 1993.

== Early life ==
Mutō was born in Kakamigahara in Gifu Prefecture in 1926. He studied at the Kyoto University. He was later elected to the House of Representatives of Japan.

== Political career ==
Mutō founded and directed a minority studies group serving the Japanese government. Mutō replaced Michio Watanabe as Minister for Foreign Affairs. After his stint as Foreign Minister, Mutō would later hold positions at the Ministry of International Trade and Industry. He subsequently retired from politics in 2005.

== Honors ==
In March 1993 he was appointed an Honorary Officer of the Order of Australia, for service to Australia–Japan relations.

== Death ==
Mutō died in a Tokyo hospital from pancreatic cancer on 4 November 2009, at age 82.

Political offices
Preceded by Michio Watanabe	Minister of Agriculture and Forestry; 1979–1980	Succeeded by Takeo Kameoka
Preceded by Hikaru Matsunaga	Minister of International Trade and Industry; 1990	Succeeded by Eiichi Nakao
Preceded by Michio Watanabe	Minister for Foreign Affairs; 1993	Succeeded by Tsutomu Hata
Preceded by Sekisuke Nakanishi	Head of the Management and Coordination Agency; 1996–1997	Succeeded by Kōkō Satō
Party political offices
Preceded by Yoshiaki Kibe	Chairman of the Executive Council, Liberal Democratic Party; 1995	Succeeded by Masajuro Shiokawa
