= Yoji Muto =

Japanese politician

- 武藤 容治
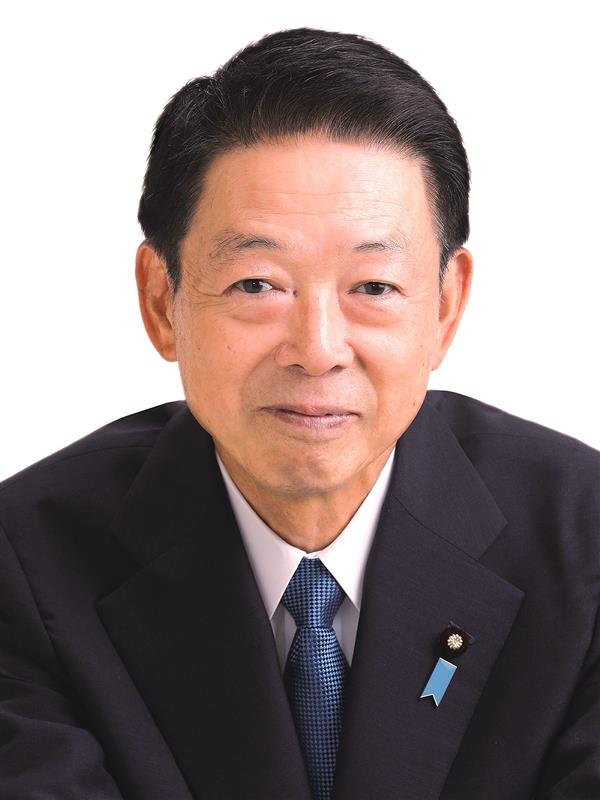
- Official portrait, 2024

Minister of Economy, Trade and Industry
- In office 1 October 2024 – 21 October 2025
- Prime Minister: Shigeru Ishiba
- Preceded by: Ken Saitō
- Succeeded by: Ryosei Akazawa

Member of the House of Representatives
- Incumbent
- Assumed office 18 December 2012
- Preceded by: Yasuhiro Sonoda
- Constituency: Gifu 3rd
- In office 12 September 2005 – 21 July 2009
- Preceded by: Kabun Mutō
- Succeeded by: Yasuhiro Sonoda
- Constituency: Gifu 3rd

Personal details
- Born: 武藤 容治 (Mutō Yōji); 18 October 1955 (age 71) Gifu, Japan
- Party: Liberal Democratic (Shikōkai)
- Parent: Kabun Mutō (father)
- Education: Keio University

Yoji Muto (武藤 容治, Mutō Yōji; born 18 October 1955) is a Japanese politician of the Liberal Democratic Party (LDP), a member of the House of Representatives in the Diet (national legislature). A native of Gifu, Gifu and graduate of Keio University, he was elected to the House for the first time in 2005. His father is former foreign minister Kabun Muto, and his grandfather is former member of the House of Representatives Kaichi Muto. He served as state minister of economy, trade and industry.

Political offices
| Preceded by Ken Saitō | Minister of Economy, Trade and Industry; 2024–present | Incumbent |
