= Yoshimi Watanabe =

Japanese politician (born 1952)

- 渡辺 喜美
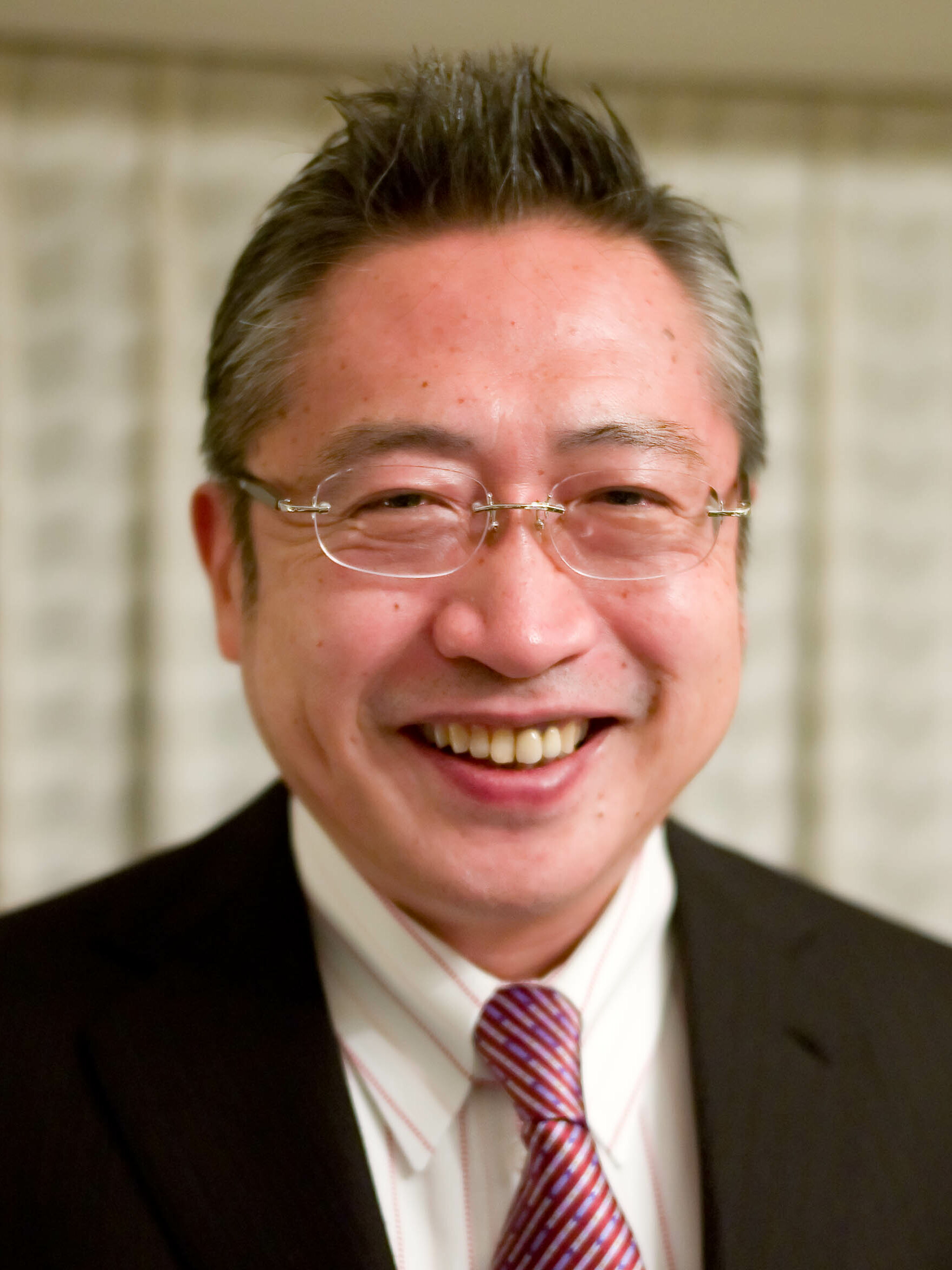
- Watanabe in 2010

Minister of State for Financial Services
- In office 27 August 2007 – 2 August 2008
- Prime Minister: Shinzo Abe; Yasuo Fukuda
- Preceded by: Yuji Yamamoto
- Succeeded by: Toshimitsu Motegi

Minister for Administrative Reform
- In office 28 December 2006 – 2 August 2008
- Prime Minister: Shinzo Abe; Yasuo Fukuda
- Preceded by: Genichiro Sata
- Succeeded by: Toshimitsu Motegi

Minister of State for Regulatory Reform
- In office 28 December 2006 – 27 August 2007
- Prime Minister: Shinzo Abe
- Preceded by: Genichiro Sata
- Succeeded by: Fumio Kishida

Member of the House of Councillors
- In office 26 July 2016 – 25 July 2022
- Constituency: National PR

Member of the House of Representatives
- In office 21 October 1996 – 21 November 2014
- Preceded by: Constituency established
- Succeeded by: Kazuo Yana
- Constituency: Tochigi 3rd

Personal details
- Born: 17 March 1952 (age 74) Nasushiobara, Tochigi, Japan
- Party: Independent
- Other political affiliations: LDP (1995–2009); Your Party (2009–2014); JIP (2016–2019)
- Parent: Michio Watanabe (father)
- Relatives: Michitaro Watanabe (nephew)
- Education: Waseda University; Chuo University

Yoshimi Watanabe (渡辺 喜美, Watanabe Yoshimi; born 17 March 1952) is a former Japanese politician. He was formerly a member of the Liberal Democratic Party and later the founder of Your Party, after which he became a member of Nippon Ishin no Kai until 2019 when he then became an independent politician. He was a member of the House of Representatives from 1996 to 2014, and returned to the Diet (national legislature) in 2016 as a member of the House of Councillors.

== Early life ==
Watanabe is a native of Nishinasuno, Nasu District, Tochigi (now part of the city of Nasushiobara) and graduated from Waseda University and Chuo University.

His father is Michio Watanabe, a major political figure first elected to the Diet while Watanabe was in junior high school.

Watanabe developed an interest in politics soon after his father was elected to office, and served as his father's secretary during the elder Watanabe's appointments as Minister of International Trade and Industry and Minister of Foreign Affairs.

Yoshimi Watanabe's nephew Michitaro Watanabe is also a politician (member of the House of Councilors).

== Political career ==
Following his father's death in 1995, Watanabe was elected to the House of Representatives for the first time in the 1996 general election, representing the Tochigi 3rd district, a newly created seat in his father's previous constituency in Tochigi Prefecture. Watanabe continued to represent the district, having successfully defended it in five subsequent general elections before being defeated in 2014.

He was tapped by Prime Minister Shinzo Abe to lead an administrative reform commission studying the potential for implementing the dōshūsei federal government system in Japan, and served in this capacity from 2006 to 2007. From August 2007 to August 2008, Cabinet of Yasuo Fukuda served as Minister in charge of financial services and Minister in charge of administrative reform, he urged the U.S. government to use public funds to solve the deepening subprime mortgage crisis, stating that "if there is a big hole in the bottom of the tub, no matter how much hot water you keep adding, you will never have enough hot water."

He supported Yuriko Koike in the 2008 LDP leadership election, which was ultimately won by Taro Aso.

=== Your Party ===
Watanabe formed Your Party as a splinter from the Liberal Democratic Party prior to the 2009 general election. His party ran on a platform of downsizing Japan's vast bureaucracy, but managed to win only five seats in the election, which was a resounding victory for the opposition Democratic Party of Japan. The party pushed forward into 2010 with a platform of deregulation and halving the corporate tax rate. His new party became popular among private investors and upper middle-class professionals.

Your Party won ten seats in the House of Councillors in the 2010 election, the third-strongest showing behind the LDP and DPJ. Watanabe planned to use his party's popularity to push for fiscal reforms, stating: "Our priority is anti-deflation legislation because Japan's economy faces the risk of a double-dip recession. We want to revise the BOJ law so the central bank and the government can agree on a goal of 2 percent inflation within two to three years." Watanabe was chosen as the Japanese public's most preferred candidate for prime minister in a July 2010 poll.

In January 2012, Watanabe announced that Your Party would join forces with Osaka governor Toru Hashimoto's political group Osaka Ishin-no-kai, and praised Hashimoto's economic reform efforts in Osaka. He announced that Your Party would sever ties with Hashimoto's Japan Restoration Party in May 2013 after Hashimoto made controversial comments regarding comfort women being a necessary part of World War II and suggesting that American servicemen use the Japanese sex industry to keep their urges under control.

Watanabe opposed the appointment of Haruhiko Kuroda as president of the Bank of Japan, saying that he would prefer to see a president come from a background other than the Ministry of Finance; he instead supported Heizo Takenaka for the position.

=== Scandal and resignation ===
In April 2014, Watanabe was found to have accepted a loan of 800 million yen from the chairman of a cosmetics company without disclosing it as a political donation. While insisting that the loan was used for personal purposes and not for political activities, he resigned as president of Your Party. The party commissioned an investigation by an outside attorney and CPA, who found that Watanabe had paid interest on the loan and had mainly used the funds for paying credit card bills for himself and his wife. While they found no violation of campaign finance laws, they discovered that Watanabe had also borrowed money from five other parties totaling 615 million yen.

In the 2014 House of Representatives election, Watanabe lost his Tochigi 3 seat as an independent to Liberal Democrat Kazuo Yana by more than 11.000 votes. In the 2016 House of Councillors election, Initiatives from Osaka announced that he would be nominated in the (nationwide) proportional district. He won a seat in the election, stating after the victory that "the story of my 'revenge' starts today. I would like to restart from scratch and work hard."

== Political positions ==
Affiliated to the openly revisionist lobby Nippon Kaigi, Watanabe is a member of the following right-wing groups in the Diet:

- Nippon Kaigi Diet discussion group (日本会議国会議員懇談会 - Nippon kaigi kokkai giin kondankai)
- Conference of parliamentarians on the Shinto Association of Spiritual Leadership (神道政治連盟国会議員懇談会 - Shinto Seiji Renmei Kokkai Giin Kondankai) - NB: SAS a.k.a. Sinseiren, Shinto Political League
- Diet Members to Discuss Japanese Future and History Education (日本の前途と歴史教育を考える議員の会)
- Pro-Yasukuni Alliance (みんなで靖国神社に参拝する国会議員の会)

Watanabe gave the following answers to the questionnaire submitted by Mainichi to parliamentarians in 2014:

- in favor of the revision of the Article 9 of the Japanese Constitution
- in favor of the right of collective self-defense
- against nuclear plants
- no problem for visits of a Prime Minister to the controversial Yasukuni Shrine
- no answer regarding the revision of the Murayama Statement
- no answer regarding the revision of the Kono Statement
- in favor of laws preventing hate speech
- no answer regarding question whether Marine Corps Air Station Futenma is a burden for Okinawa
- in favor of the Special Secrecy Law
- in favor of teaching 'morality' in school

== In media ==
He appears in "Takeshi-no-TV-tackle", a humorous political discussion show hosted by comedian Takeshi Kitano.

== Personal life ==
Watanabe is married with three children.

House of Representatives (Japan)
Preceded by Seat created	Representative for Tochigi's 3rd District; 1996 – 2014	Succeeded by Kazuo Yana
Political offices
Preceded by Yuji Yamamoto; Financial Services; Genichiro Sata; Administrative Reform	Minister of State for Financial Services and Administrative Reform of Japan; 2007–2008	Succeeded by Toshimitsu Motegi
Preceded by Kōki Chūma	Minister of State for Regulatory Reform of Japan; 2006–2007	Succeeded by Fumio Kishida
