= Sekisuke Nakanishi =

Japanese politician (1926–2025)

- 中西 績介

Director-General of the Management and Coordination Agency
- In office 11 January 1996 – 7 November 1996
- Prime Minister: Ryutaro Hashimoto
- Preceded by: Masaaki Nakayama
- Succeeded by: Kabun Mutō

Member of the House of Representatives
- In office 10 December 1976 – 10 October 2003
- Preceded by: Hōsei Yoshida
- Succeeded by: Multi-member district
- Constituency: Fukuoka 4th (1976–1996); Kyushu PR (1996–2003)

Personal details
- Born: 6 February 1926 Kawara, Fukuoka, Japan
- Died: 24 January 2025 (aged 98) Fukuoka, Japan
- Party: Social Democratic
- Other political affiliations: Socialist (1976–1996)
- Education: Mie University
- Occupation: Schoolteacher

Sekisuke Nakanishi (Japanese: 中西 績介 Nakanishi Sekisuke; 6 February 1926 – 24 January 2025) was a Japanese politician. A member of the Japan Socialist Party and the Social Democratic Party, he served in the House of Representatives from 1976 to 2003.

Nakanishi died on 24 January 2025, at the age of 98.
