= Toshikazu Kase =

Japanese diplomat (1903–2004)

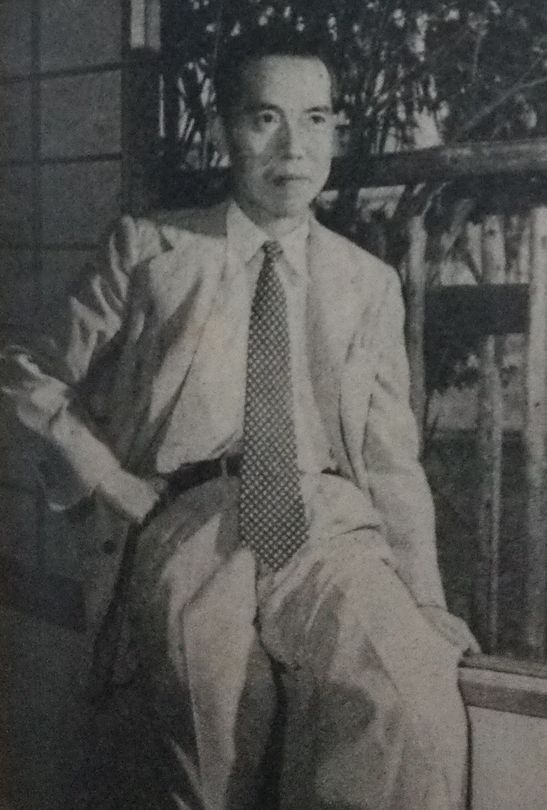
- Born: January 12, 1903; Chiba, Japan
- Died: May 21, 2004 (aged 101); Kamakura, Japan
- Occupation: Diplomat

Toshikazu Kase (加瀬 俊一, Kase Toshikazu; January 12, 1903 – May 21, 2004) was a Japanese civil servant and career diplomat. During World War II he was a high-ranking Foreign Ministry official. Hideaki Kase (1936–2022) was his son and Yoko Ono is his niece.

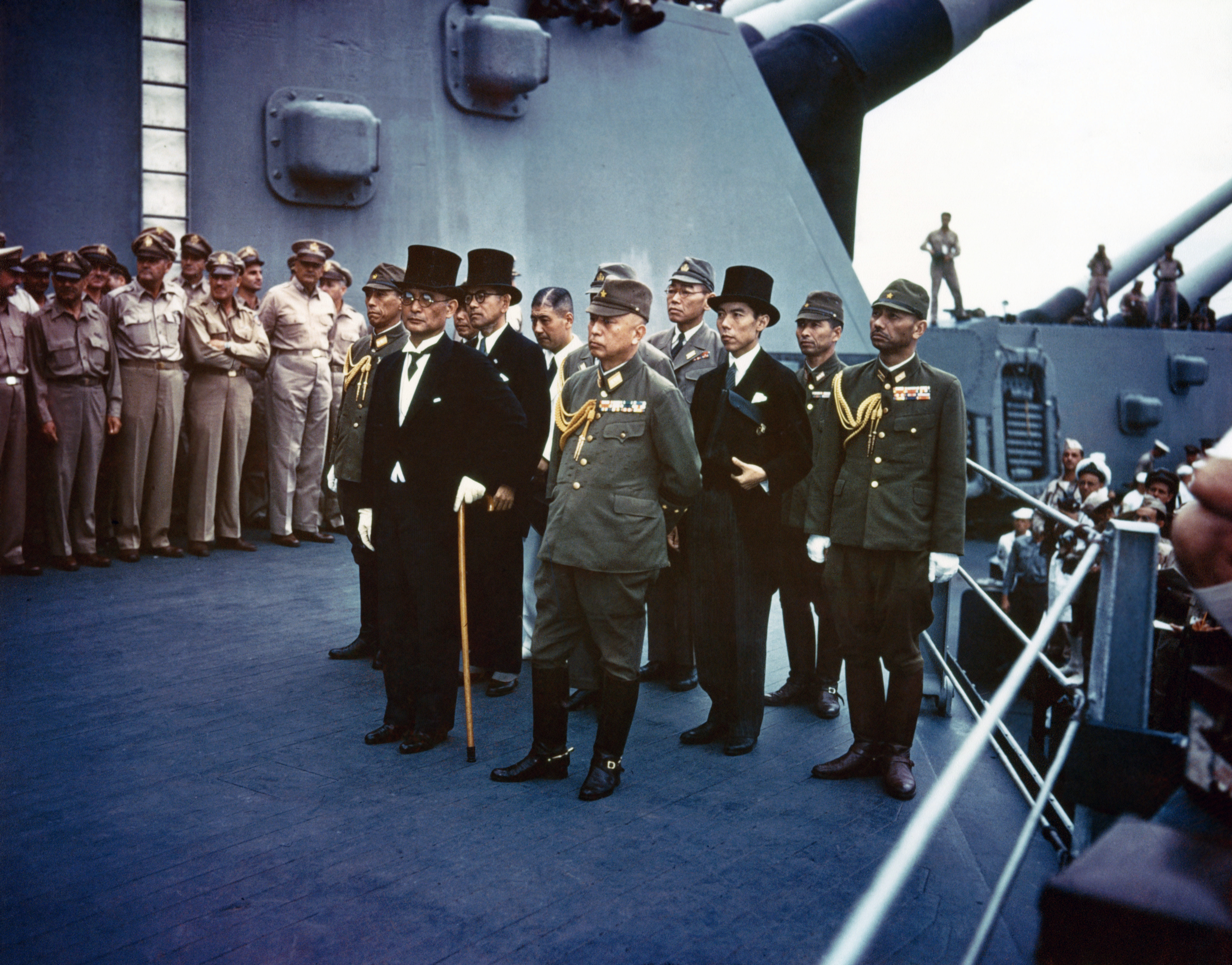
The Japanese representatives on board USS Missouri during the surrender ceremonies on September 2, 1945. Kase on right, wearing top hat.

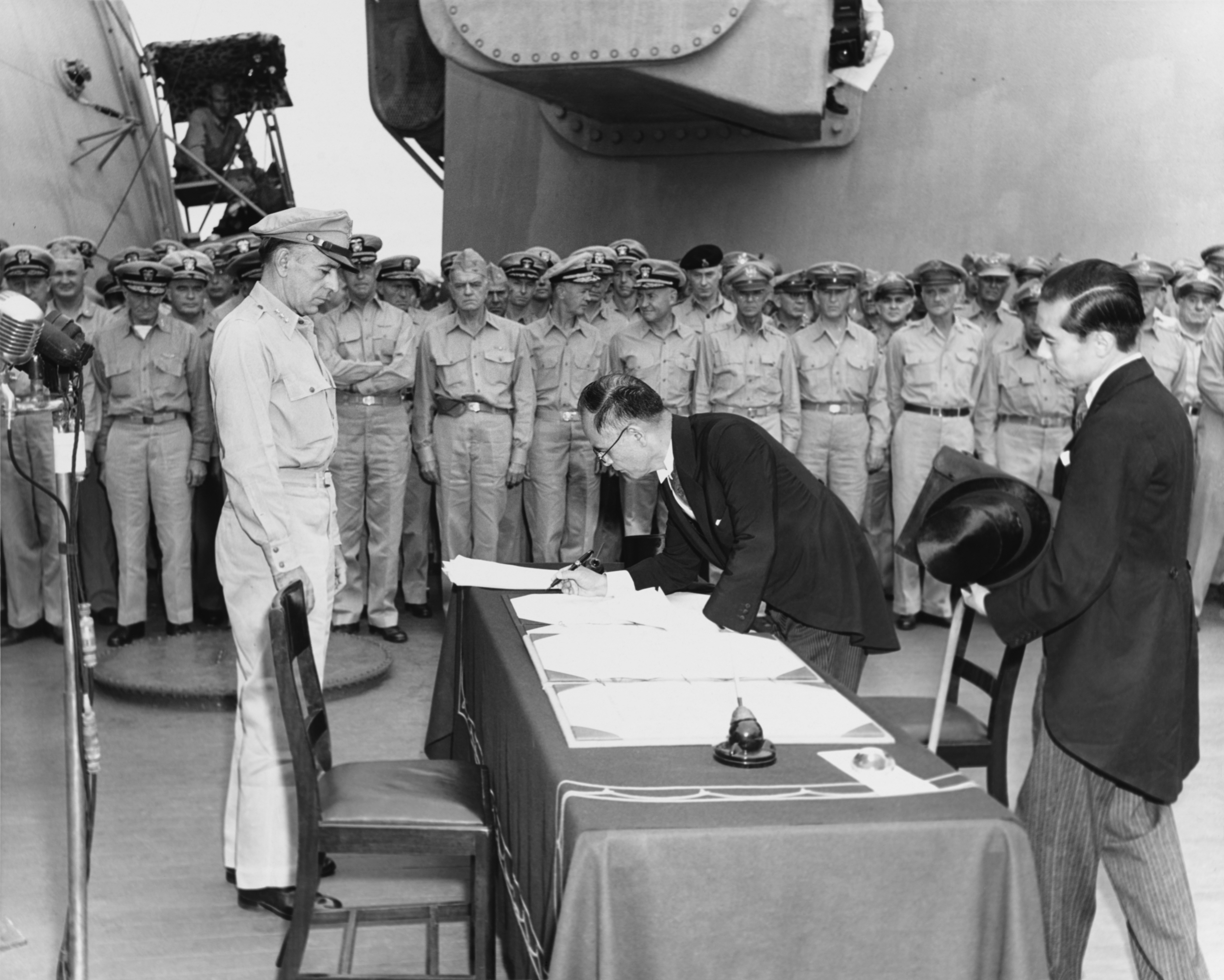
Kase (right) with Japanese Foreign Minister Shigemitsu at signing of Instrument of Surrender on board USS Missouri, September 2, 1945

== Biography ==
Kase was born in Chiba, Japan, from a family of upper-class landowners. After passing his Foreign Service Examination in 1925 he left Tokyo Higher Commercial College (later Hitotsubashi University) and attended Amherst College and Harvard as a Research Fellow, graduating in 1927.

He had a son, Hideaki Kase (1936–2022), who became a diplomatic critic in promoting Japanese WWII historical revisionism books and films.

He took up diplomatic posts in both Berlin and London before returning to Tokyo where he was posted to the North America desk of the Japanese Foreign Office. He was on duty on the weekend of the Pearl Harbor attack in December 1941. Acting as secretary to Foreign Minister Shigenori Togo, Kase had assisted in the preparation of the document formally terminating negotiations with the United States. In an interview after retirement, he blamed Japanese diplomats in Washington for delays in decoding and delivering the cabled text of the statement, which he claimed should have been delivered an hour prior to the beginning of the attack.

On September 2, 1945, Kase was present as part of the Japanese delegation on board USS Missouri for the signing of the treaty of surrender in 1945. At his suggestion Foreign Minister Mamoru Shigemitsu and other civilian members of the party wore formal diplomatic attire of morning dress and top hats "because we were representing our sovereign" (an exception to this was Saburo Ota, who wore no hat and whose white suit contrasted with other civilian members' mostly black morning dress). Kase had drafted the English text of the document accepting the terms of the Potsdam Declaration.

Kase continued to work in the Foreign Ministry until 1948 when he left to practice journalism. In 1950 Kase published a book that gave an account of the war from a Japanese perspective.

Resuming his diplomatic career in 1954, Kase took up an appointment as chief advisor to the same foreign minister whom he had assisted at the surrender ceremony on board the USS Missouri. In 1955 he became Japan's first ambassador to the United Nations. His final diplomatic posting, before retiring in 1960, was as ambassador to Belgrade.

Kase was interviewed in English for the 1970s documentary series The World at War.

Kase died, aged 101 years, in Kamakura, of heart failure.

== See also ==
- Shun'ichi Kase, Japanese diplomat whose name is spelt with the same characters as Toshikazu's
- Japanese nationalism

== Other sources ==
- Toshikazu Kase at IMDb
- Journey To The Missouri at the Internet Archive

Diplomatic posts
Preceded by Renzō Sawada	Japanese Ambassador to the United Nations; 1955–1957	Succeeded by Koto Matsudaira
Preceded by New office	Japanese Ambassador to Yugoslavia; 1958–1960	Succeeded by Yōsuke Nakae
