= Koichi Takemasa =

Japanese politician

- 武正 公一
- Official portrait, 2012

Member of the House of Representatives; from Northern Kanto
- In office 1 November 2024 – 23 January 2026
- Constituency: PR block
- In office 26 June 2000 – 28 September 2017
- Preceded by: Hikaru Matsunaga
- Succeeded by: Multi-member district
- Constituency: Saitama 1st (2000–2012); PR block (2012–2017)

Member of the Saitama Prefectural Assembly
- In office 1995–2000
- Constituency: South 3rd

Personal details
- Born: 23 March 1961 (age 65) Shimizu, Shizuoka, Japan
- Party: CRA (since 2026)
- Other political affiliations: Independent (before 2000); DPJ (2000–2016); DP (2016–2017); KnT (2017–2018); CDP (2018–2026)
- Education: Keio University

Koichi Takemasa (武正 公一, Takemasa Kōichi; born 23 March 1961) is a Japanese politician who served in the House of Representatives in the Diet (national legislature) as a member of the Constitutional Democratic Party. A native of Shimizu, Shizuoka and graduate of Keio University he was elected for the first time in 1995 after an unsuccessful run in 1991.
