= Kosaku Inaba =

Japanese businessman

Kosaku Inaba (稲葉 興作, Inaba Kōsaku, January 16, 1924 – November 16, 2006) was a Singapore-born Japanese businessman, former president of Ishikawajima-Harima Heavy Industries Co., head of the Japan Chamber of Commerce and Industry (1993–2001) and second president of Nippon Kaigi (1998–2001). He was a graduate of Azabu High School and Tokyo Institute of Technology. He joined the Ishikawajima Shibaura Turbine Co. in 1946. In 1962, the company merged with Ishikawajima-Shibaura Seiki Co. and Shibaura Sewing Machine Co. and changed its name to its current one. Inaba rose through the ranks as board director, managing director and senior vice president before becoming president of the company in 1983 and chairman in 1995. He was a recipient of the Order of the Rising Sun.

Preceded by Rokuro Ishikawa	Chairman of the Japan Chamber of Commerce and Industry; 1993–2001	Succeeded by Nobuo Yamamoto
Preceded by Rokuro Ishikawa	Chairman of the Tokyo Chamber of Commerce and Industry; 1993–2001	Succeeded by Nobuo Yamamoto
Preceded by Koichi Tsukamoto	President of Nippon Kaigi; 1998–2001	Succeeded by Toru Miyoshi
