= Koichi Tsukamoto =

Japanese businessman (1920–1998)

Tsukamoto during his days at Hachiman Commercial School

Tsukamoto during his military career

Koichi Tsukamoto (塚本 幸一, Tsukamoto Kōichi; September 17, 1920 – June 10, 1998) was a Japanese businessman, the founder of Wacoal, and the first President of Nippon Kaigi (1997–1998).

He was from the former town of Gokashō, now part of Higashiōmi, in Shiga Prefecture. He enlisted in the Imperial Japanese Army in 1940 and fought in Battle of Imphal during the Burma Campaign of the Pacific War, aged only 19. He was demobilized 3 years later at age 21.

In 1968, at an event held by the Japanese industrialist Kōnosuke Matsushita to celebrate the hundred years anniversary of the Meiji Restoration, he met the composer Toshiro Mayuzumi. He had a three decade friendship with him and attended his memorial on May 29, 1997.

== Business activities ==
In 1946, he founded his own company in Kyoto, which made women's underwear such as bras, girdles, and nightgowns. His company became global after obtaining its current name (Wacoal) in 1957, with subsidiaries in United States, France, China, Singapore, Vietnam, and Thailand. He was a recipient of the Order of the Sacred Treasure. In 1998, the year of his death, his company had a net income of 8.2 billion Japanese yen ($61.2 million US) with sales of 170 billion yen ($1.2 billion US). His son, Yoshikata Tsukamoto, is the current chairman and president of Wacoal.

Preceded by New office	President of Nippon Kaigi; 1997–1998	Succeeded by Kosaku Inaba

== Bibliography ==
- 塚本幸一『私の履歴書』日本経済新聞社 1991年1月25日 ISBN 4532160030
