= Nippon Kaigi =

Japanese far-right organisation

Japan Conference 日本会議
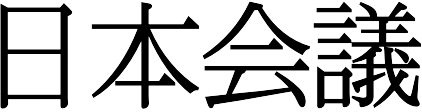
- Chairman: Tomohiko Taniguchi
- General Secretary: Yuzo Kabashima
- Founder: Koichi Tsukamoto
- Founded: 30 May 1997; 29 years ago
- Merger of: Nihon wo mamoru Kokumin Kaigi and Nihon wo mamoru Kai
- Headquarters: Vort Aobadai II, Aobadai, Meguro, Tokyo
- Membership: c. 38,000 – 40,000 (2020 est.)
- Ideology: Ultraconservatism (Japanese); Religious nationalism; Japanese ultranationalism; Historical negationism; Militarism; Reactionism
- Political position: Far-right
- Affiliations: Nippon Kaigi National Lawmakers Friendship Association
- Colours: Black; Carmine

Website
- www.nipponkaigi.org

Nippon Kaigi (日本会議; lit. 'Japan Conference') is Japan's largest ultraconservative and ultranationalist far-right non-governmental organisation and lobbying group. It was established in 1997 and has approximately 38,000 to 40,000 members as of 2020. (Note: The group influences the legislative and executive branches of the Japanese government through its affiliates. Former prime minister and LDP President, Shinzo Abe, served as a special advisor to the group's parliamentary league. The group's membership includes grassroots activists as well as national and local politicians; with most of its active members being retired men over 60 years of age as the organisation has faced difficulty attracting young people.)

The organisation describes its aims as to "change the postwar national consciousness based on the Tokyo Tribunal's view of history as a fundamental problem" and to revise Japan's current constitution, especially Article 9 which forbids the maintenance of a standing army. The group also aims to promote "patriotic education" and a nationalist interpretation of State Shinto, negationist views in regards to World War II, and supports official visits to the Yasukuni Shrine by Japanese ministers. It also denies that comfort women, recruited by Japan during World War II, were forced to work.

The group has significant influence in Japanese politics. Many current and former ministers and prime ministers have been members, including Sanae Takaichi, Shigeru Ishiba, Tarō Asō, Shinzō Abe and Yoshihide Suga. In the words of Hideaki Kase, an influential member of Nippon Kaigi, "We are dedicated to our conservative cause. We are monarchists. We are for revising the constitution. We are for the glory of the nation."

== Objectives ==
Nippon Kaigi has described six official goals of the organisation as:

1. "A beautiful traditional sovereignty for Japan's future" (美しい伝統の国柄を明日の日本へ): Fostering a sense of Japanese unity and social stability, based around the Imperial Household and shared history, culture, and traditions of the Japanese people, including by designating Japanese as the official language of the nation.
2. "A new constitution appropriate for the new era" (新しい時代にふさわしい新憲法を): Restoring national defense rights, rectifying the imbalance of rights and obligations, strengthening the emphasis on the family system, and loosening the separation of religion and state.
3. "Politics that protect the state's reputation and the people's lives" (国の名誉と国民の命を守る政治を): Addressing the loss of public interest in politics and government by taking a more aggressive stance in historical debates and crisis management.
4. "Creating education that fosters a sense of Japanese identity" (日本の感性をはぐくむ教育の創造を): Addressing various problems arising in the Japanese educational system (bullying, prostitution, etc.) and instituting respect for the national flag and anthem of Japan, and for national history, culture, and traditions.
5. "Contributing to world peace by strengthening national security" (国の安全を高め世界への平和貢献を): Strengthening Japanese defense power in order to counterbalance China, North Korea, Russia, and other hostile powers, and remembering Japan's war dead.
6. "Friendship with the world tied together by a spirit of co-existence and mutual prosperity" (共生共栄の心でむすぶ世界との友好を): Building friendly relations with foreign countries through social and cultural exchange programs.

Nippon Kaigi believes that "Japan should be applauded for liberating much of East Asia from Western colonial powers; that the 1946–1948 Tokyo War Crimes tribunals were illegitimate; and that killings by Imperial Japanese troops during the 1937 Nanjing Massacre were exaggerated or fabricated". (Note: For further information, see the articles Nanjing Massacre denial, Japanese history textbook controversies, and China–Japan relations.) The group vigorously defends Japan's claim in its territorial dispute over the Senkaku Islands with China, and denies that Japan forced the comfort women into sexual slavery during World War II. Nippon Kaigi opposes feminism, LGBTQ rights, and the 1999 Gender Equality Law. It has specifically worked to oppose the legalization of same-sex marriage in Japan. It also wants to restore the divine status of Japan's emperor, make women's place in society be in the home and place public order above civil liberties.

== History ==
Nippon Kaigi was founded in 1997 through the merger of two groups whose agendas included constitutional revision:

- Nihon wo mamoru Kokumin Kaigi (National Conference to Defend [or Protect] Japan, founded in 1981) included many veterans of Japan's Imperial Army and Navy, and published its own constitutional reform draft in 1994. Its predecessor was Gengo Houseika Jitsugen Kokumin Kaigi (National Conference to Implement Regnal Year Legislation, founded in 1978).
- Nihon wo mamoru Kai (Society for the Protection of Japan, founded in 1974), that comprised several Shinto and religious organisations.

Toshiro Mayuzumi, leader of the Nihon wo mamoru Kokumin Kaigi, was a pivotal figure in the merger, and was slated to become the first president of Nippon Kaigi, but he died of illness on 10 April 1997, shortly before the new organisation's first meeting in May 1997. The position of founding president fell to Koichi Tsukamoto, the founder of Japanese clothier Wacoal. Yuzo Kabashima, the secretary general of Nippon Kaigi, established a sister organisation Nihon Seinen Kyogikai in 1977, which is headquartered in the same building as Nippon Kaigi and acts as the organisation's secretariat. The Nippon Kaigi Parliamentarian Association was also established in 1997.

The organisation saw swift success in establishing strong connections among the establishment and in passing legislation that was congruent with the group's aims. In 1999, the Diet at last formally recognised Kimigayo as Japan's national anthem and the Hi no Maru as Japan's national flag. After the legislation passed, ensuing years saw the Ministry of Education and prefectural educational committees such as those of Tokyo governor Shintaro Ishihara issue guidelines requiring school teachers to adhere to specific procedures concerning these national symbols in the educational context.

== Organisation and membership ==
Nippon Kaigi claims 40,000 individual members, 47 prefectural chapters, and about 230 local chapters. The organisation's website lists the members depending on their seniority in the organisation headed by a President seconded by Vice Presidents and a pool of "advisors", including Shinto priests leading key shrines, some of them belonging to the Imperial family.

Following the 2014 reshuffle, 15 of the 19 Third Abe Cabinet members, including the Prime Minister himself (as 'special adviser'), were members of Nippon Kaigi. Among the members, former members, and affiliated have been countless lawmakers, many ministers and a few prime ministers including Sanae Takaichi, Tarō Asō, Shinzō Abe, and Yoshihide Suga. Abe's brother Nobuo Kishi is also a member of the Nippon Kaigi group in the Diet. Its ex-chairman, Toru Miyoshi, was the former Chief Justice of the Supreme Court of Japan.

After campaigning actively for Liberal Democratic Party (LDP) candidates in July 2016, Nippon Kaigi campaigned for constitutional revision in September 2016.

== Presidency ==
List of presidents
Year	Name	Period	Time in office
1997	Koichi Tsukamoto	1997–1998	1 year
1998	Kosaku Inaba	1998–2001	3 years
2001	Toru Miyoshi	2001–2015	14 years
2015	Tadae Takubo	2015–2024	9 years
2025	Tomohiko Taniguchi	2025–present	—N/a

== Criticism ==
Journalist Norimitsu Onishi says that the organisation promotes a revival of the values of the Empire of Japan. Tamotsu Sugano, the author of the bestselling exposé on the group, Research on Nippon Kaigi (日本会議の研究), describes it as a movement democratic in method but intent on examining gender equality, restoring patriarchal/family values and returning Japan to a pre-war constitution that is neither democratic nor modern. On 6 January 2017, sale of the book was banned by a district court for defamation, pending removal of the offending portion; a revised digital edition continued to be sold. Sales resumed that March when the court allowed a revised edition with 36 characters deleted to appear.

Muneo Narusawa, the editor of Friday Weekly (週刊金曜日, Shūkan Kin'yōbi), says that, in parallel with historical negationism, the organisation often highlights historical facts that portray Japan as a victim, such as with the atomic bombings of Hiroshima and Nagasaki, the Soviet declaration of war and invasion of Manchuria, and the North Korean abductions of Japanese citizens. Former education minister Hakubun Shimomura, the secretary general of the Discussion Group of Nippon Kaigi Diet Members (日本会議国会議員懇談会, Nippon Kaigi Kokkai Giin Kondankai), argues for patriotic education and opposes a "masochistic view of history".

The Hankyoreh, a liberal newspaper in South Korea, denounced right-wing nationalism led by Shinzo Abe and Nippon Kaigi as "anti-Korean nationalism" in its English column. Gabriel Rodriguez, in Jacobin, an American left-wing magazine, wrote the LDP and Nippon Kaigi carry the legacy of Japanese fascism.

== See also ==
- Historical negationism – Distortion of historical record
- Historical revisionism – Reinterpretation of a historical account
- Japanese militarism – Militaristic ideology espoused by the Empire of Japan (1873–1945)
- Japanese nationalism
- Japanese Society for History Textbook Reform – Japanese policy advocacy organization
- Liberal Democratic Party of Japan – Japanese political party
  - Seiwa Seisaku Kenkyūkai – Japanese political party faction
  - Shinzo Abe – Prime Minister of Japan (2006–2007; 2012–2020)
  - Sanae Takaichi – Prime Minister of Japan since 2025
- Seicho-no-Ie – Fundamental movement sect
- Ultranationalism (Japan) – Political ideology in Japan
