= Toru Miyoshi =

Japanese jurist (1927–2023)

Chief Justice of Japan
- In office 7 October 1995 – 30 October 1997
- Preceded by: Ryohachi Kusaba
- Succeeded by: Shigeru Yamaguchi

Personal details
- Born: 31 October 1927 Tokyo Prefecture, Japan
- Died: 6 March 2023 (aged 95) Tokyo, Japan
- Education: Imperial Japanese Naval Academy; University of Tokyo
- Occupation: Jurist
- The third president and honorary Chairman of Nippon Kaigi

Toru Miyoshi (Japanese: 三好達 Miyoshi Tōru; 31 October 1927 – 6 March 2023) was a prominent Japanese jurist and political activist. He held the position of Chief Justice of Japan from 1995 to 1997.

Miyoshi also served as the third president and later as honorary Chairman of Nippon Kaigi.

He died in Tokyo on 6 March 2023, at the age of 95.
