= Tatsuo Ozawa =

Japanese politician (1916–2013)

- 小沢 辰男

President of the Reform Club
- In office 1 January 1998 – 25 June 2000
- Preceded by: Position established
- Succeeded by: Position abolished

Minister of Health and Welfare
- In office 28 November 1977 – 7 December 1978
- Prime Minister: Takeo Fukuda
- Preceded by: Michio Watanabe
- Succeeded by: Ryutaro Hashimoto

Director-General of the Environmental Agency
- In office 9 December 1974 – 15 September 1976
- Prime Minister: Takeo Miki
- Preceded by: Matsuhei Mōri
- Succeeded by: Shigesada Marumo

Minister of Construction
- In office 11 November 1974 – 9 December 1974
- Prime Minister: Kakuei Tanaka
- Preceded by: Takao Kameoka
- Succeeded by: Tadao Kariya

Member of the House of Representatives
- In office 21 November 1960 – 2 June 2000
- Preceded by: Hideichi Ōshima
- Succeeded by: Multi-member district
- Constituency: Niigata 1st (1960–1996); Hokuriku-Shin'etsu PR (1996–2000)

Personal details
- Born: 7 December 1916 Niigata City, Niigata, Japan
- Died: 13 October 2013 (aged 96) Minato, Tokyo, Japan
- Party: Reform Club
- Other political affiliations: LDP (1960–1993); JRP (1993–1994); NFP (1994–1998)
- Education: Tokyo Imperial University

Tatsuo Ozawa (小沢 辰男, Ozawa Tatsuo; 7 December 1916 – 13 October 2013) was a Japanese politician who served as minister of health and welfare, construction minister, and head of the Environment Agency.

Born in Niigata City as the son of House of Representatives member Kuniji Ozawa, and a graduate of Tokyo Imperial University's Law Department (School of Political Science), Ozawa joined the Home Ministry upon graduation. When that ministry was abolished in 1947, he was transferred to the Welfare Ministry.

He first won a seat in the House of Representatives in 1960, (on an LDP ticket) and served 13 consecutive terms.

In 1994, he founded the Niigata University of International and Information Studies.

Ozawa founded the Reform Club (Japanese: 改革クラブ) political party in 1998, and served as its leader until his retirement from politics in 2000.

== Awards ==
- Grand Cordon of the Rising Sun, First Class (2000)

House of Representatives (Japan)
| Preceded by Kinji Moriyama | Chair, Committee on Social and Labour Affairs of the House of Representatives; 1972 | Succeeded by Seiichi Tagawa |
| Preceded by Megumu Sato | Chair, Committee on Discipline of the House of Representatives; 1997 | Succeeded by Atsushi Kanda |
Political offices
| Preceded by Takao Kameoka | Minister of Construction; 1974 | Succeeded by Tadao Kariya |
| Preceded by Matsuhei Mōri | Director of the Environmental Agency; 1974–1976 | Succeeded by Shigesada Marumo |
| Preceded by Michio Watanabe | Ministry of Health and Welfare; 1977–1978 | Succeeded by Ryutaro Hashimoto |
Party political offices
| New title | President of the Reform Club; 1998–2000 | Party dissolved |
