= Hideaki Kase =

Japanese historical revisionist (1936–2022)

- 加瀬 英明
- Born: 22 December 1936; Tokyo, Japan
- Died: 15 November 2022 (aged 85)
- Occupations: Chairman of Society for the Dissemination of Historical Fact; Takushoku University Lecturer
- Known for: Historical revisionism Historical negationism Anti-Korean sentiment

Hideaki Kase (加瀬 英明, Kase Hideaki; 22 December 1936 – 15 November 2022) was a Japanese diplomatic critic known for promoting historical negationism. His father, Toshikazu Kase, was a diplomat under Shigenori Tōgō who negotiated an end to the Pacific war. Yoko Ono is his cousin.

== Revisionist organizations ==
Kase was the Chairman of Society for the Dissemination of Historical Fact, a right-wing organization promoting historical revisionism, including denial of Imperial Japan's war crimes, such as the Nanjing Massacre and abduction of comfort women. In an interview with BBC journalist Bethan Jinkinson, Kase said: "The majority of our people believe that Japan was forced into war by the United States. America was making unreasonable demands upon us. So we were fighting a war of national self-defence". Kase wrote episodes of friendship with John Lennon for the Sankei Shinbun newspaper on 8 December 2016. Kase said to John Lennon, "the USA forced Japan to fight the USA and reluctantly Japan fought in self-defense. Japanese were the same as Vietnamese who were attacked by the USA." John Lennon visited many Japanese Shinto Shrines, and one of them was Yasukuni Shrine. Kase and Ono were in the family of Yasuda zaibatsu, and Yoko Ono was seen as a nuisance in this prestigious financial clan, but Hideaki Kase got along with Yoko Ono.

Also a member of Nippon Kaigi, Kase said about that openly revisionist lobby: "We are dedicated to our conservative cause. We are monarchists. We are for revising the constitution. We are for the glory of the nation".

== "Ugly Korean" ==
He was published in March 1993 and is the author of "Ugly Korean" (醜い韓国人), a Kenkan genre book that has gained considerable popularity in Japan. The contents of the book are accused of maliciously distorting Korean culture and history.

== Revisionist films ==
Hideaki Kase had a history of promoting controversial films that contest Japanese war crimes:

- Kase was the head of the production committee for the Japanese film "Merdeka 17805" (2001), which caused minor outrage in Indonesia because it depicted Imperial Japan as a liberating force instead of the aggressor.
- Merdeka 17805 was produced in partnership with Katsuaki Asano, the president of Tokyo Film Production, also his partner in the movie "Pride, the Fateful Moment" (1998), that stirred debate by the way it depicted the Tokyo war crimes tribunal and General Hideki Tojo.
- Kase was also among the main advocates of the movie The Truth about Nanjing (2007), that negates Japan's responsibility in the Nanjing massacre.

== Personal life and death ==
Kase died on 15 November 2022, at the age of 85.

== See also ==
- Kowner, Rotem. "Hidea Kase, the Ultranationalist Figure Who wanted to Make Japan Great Again", online Haartz Weekend Brief, 25 Nov. 2022.
- Japanese nationalism
- Nippon Kaigi
- Nanking Massacre denial
- Historical revisionism (negationism)
