= Wacoal =

Manufacturer of women's lingerie and underwear

Wacoal Holdings
- Native name: 株式会社ワコールホールディングス
- Type: Public
- Traded as: TYO: 3591
- Founded: 1 November 1949; 76 years ago
- Headquarters: Kyoto, Japan
- Brands: Wacoal; b.tempt'd; Elomi; Eveden; Fantasie; Freya; Lively; Goddess
- Website: www.wacoalholdings.jp/en/

Wacoal (Japanese: ワコール) is a manufacturer of women's lingerie and underwear, founded in 1949 in Japan by Koichi Tsukamoto. The company has divisions in North America and Europe, and manufactures the brands Wacoal, b.tempt'd, Elomi, Eveden, Fantasie, Freya, Lively, and Goddess.

== Company history ==
The name Wacoal comes from Wakō Shoji (和江商事), the original legal business name (which meant harmonizing (wa, 和) with Kōshu (江, short for Ōmi Province where founder Tsukamoto spent his childhood). Adding "forever" (aru, 留) in 1957, the brand was formed.

In 1964, Wacoal established the Human Science Research Center to conduct scientific research on women's beauty, health, and bodies for product development.

In 1985, Wacoal launched in America. To encourage potential customers to purchase the new brand despite the higher prices than its competitors, Wacoal's fit experts partnered with sales associates in department stores across the country to educate consumers about the fit and quality of Wacoal products. In 2009, Wacoal launched b.tempt'd, an intimate apparel brand aimed toward younger consumers.

In 2012, Wacoal acquired the Eveden Group, a UK-based lingerie manufacturer founded in 1920, bringing the full-figure brands Freya, Elomi, Fantasie, and Goddess under its corporate umbrella.

Thai subsidiary Thai Wacoal Public Company Limited is listed on the Stock Exchange of Thailand.

== Brand portfolio ==
- Wacoal, flagship brand, launched in 1949 in Japan and 1985 in the United States
- b.tempt'd, junior brand (sizes 30AA–38E), launched in 2009 worldwide
- Elomi, launched 2008 in the UK by Eveden Group, full-figure bras and swimwear (34 bands and up, D through K cup)
- Eveden, launched 1920 in the UK
- Fantasie, full-figure bras and swimwear, formerly produced by Eveden Group
- Freya, launched 1998 in the UK by Eveden Group, large-bust bras and swimwear up to K cup and sports bras and swimwear up to H cup
- Goddess, launched in the US and acquired in 2002 by Eveden Group, full-figure bras and swimwear

== Product manufacturing ==
Wacoal products are manufactured almost entirely by hand. Much of the production occurs at Wacoal Vietnam, a manufacturing location established in 1997.

== Philanthropic efforts ==
Wacoal launched a bra in 1999 known as the Awareness Bra, which features a pink ribbon on each band to remind women to be conscious of their breast health. In 2001, the Fit for the Cure campaign was launched to raise funds for breast cancer awareness and research. Wacoal donates to Susan G. Komen for every woman who participates in a complimentary fitting during Fit for the Cure.

== Controversy ==
In 2026 Wacoal ad (collaboration with TV show Girl from Nowhere) sparked a controversy for inappropriate use of suggestive language in the advertisement featuring a female student unbuttoning her skirt in class.
