= Your Party (Japan) =

Political party in Japan (2009–2014)

Your Party みんなの党 Minna no Tō
- Founder: Yoshimi Watanabe
- Founded: August 8, 2009
- Dissolved: November 28, 2014
- Split from: Liberal Democratic Party; Democratic Party of Japan
- Ideology: Conservatism; Neoliberalism
- Political position: Centre-right
- Colors: Red (official); Hot pink (customary)

Website
- www.your-party.jp

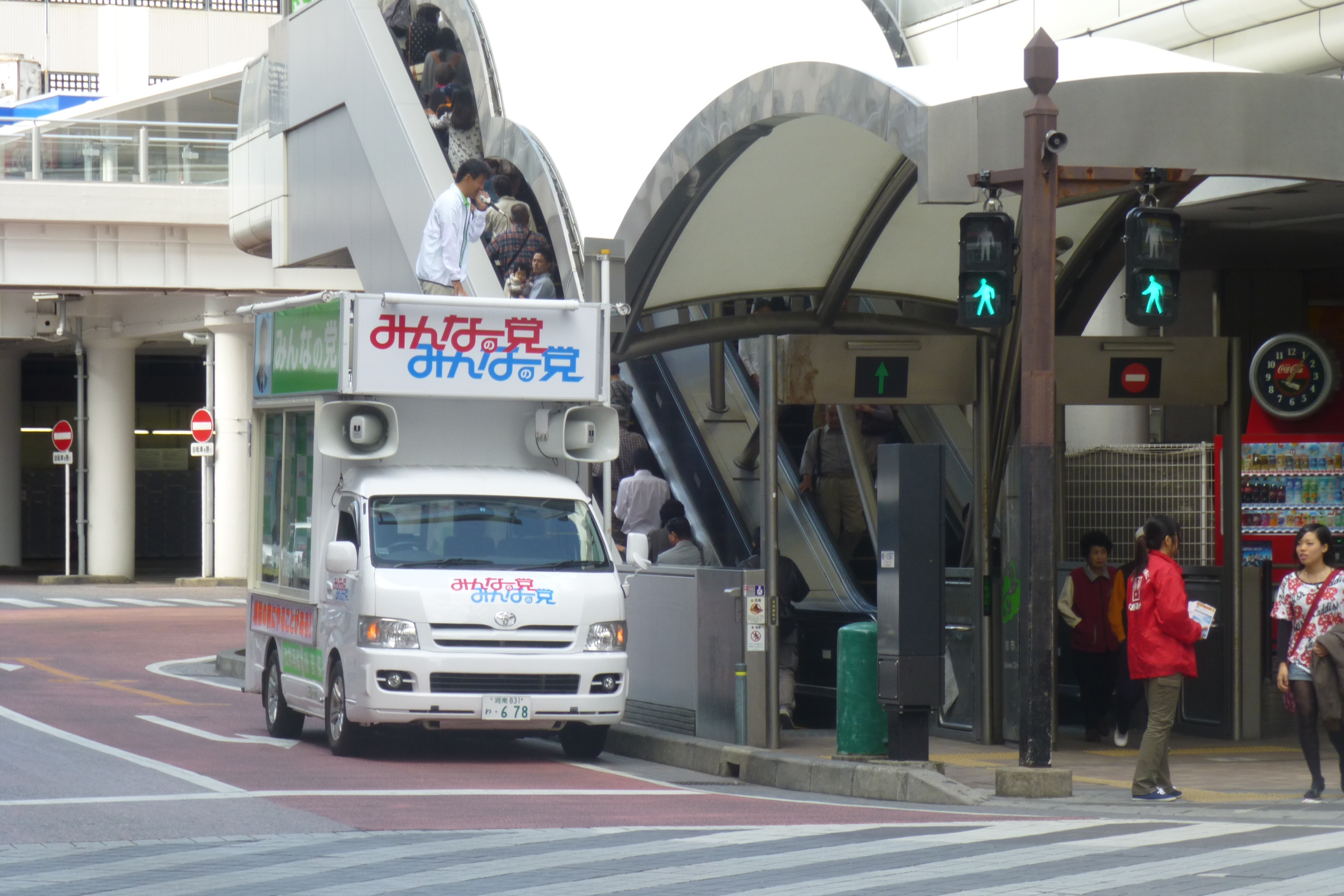
A campaign truck announcing policy outside Kashiwa Station in Chiba.

Your Party (みんなの党, Minna no Tō; lit. 'Everyone's Party') was a political party in Japan led by Yoshimi Watanabe from 2009 until its dissolution in 2014. The party was founded after Watanabe split from the Liberal Democratic Party, with the aim of making the government more democratic and reducing bureaucratic control of policymaking. Your Party was generally described as centre-right, conservative, and neoliberal, advocating lower taxation, free trade, smaller government, and reduced regulation. The party won seats in both houses of the National Diet following the 2009 and 2010 elections and expanded its representation in 2012 before dissolving in November 2014 amid falling support and internal disagreement over the upcoming general election.

== History ==
Led by Yoshimi Watanabe, who split from the Liberal Democratic Party (LDP), the party was founded on August 8, 2009 after then-Prime Minister Taro Aso dissolved the lower house. One concept behind the party was to make the government more democratic, and to eliminate control of the government by non-elected members established in the bureaucracy. In this respect, Watanabe has repeatedly stated that his position is compatible with the Democratic Party of Japan.

Your Party advocated lower taxation, free enterprise, smaller government, and less regulation.

The party fielded 13 candidates in the August 2009 general elections. Five of those candidates were elected to the lower house. In the 2010 house of Councillors election, it gained 10 seats. It also made gains at the 2011 regional elections, and in the 2012 general election, where it increased its seats from eight in the lower house to eighteen.

Following an announcement by Prime Minister Shinzō Abe for an election to be held in December 2014, the party's 20 members voted on November 19, 2014 to disband on November 28, 2014. Falling support and disagreement over whether to side with the ruling coalition in the upcoming election were identified as reasons for the split.

== Ideology and policies ==
The Your party has been described as centre-right, conservative, neoliberal, and economically liberal. The party's policies focused on fiscal reforms such as tax cuts, free trade, budget cuts, anti-deflation measures, financial liberalisation, and increased government involvement in the Bank of Japan's policy-making. The party also supported administrative reforms aimed at smaller government and transferring power from central ministries to local governments.

== Presidents of YP ==
No.	Name	Image	Term of office	
No.	Name	Image	Took office	Left office
1	Yoshimi Watanabe		September 2009	April 2014
2	Keiichiro Asao		April 2014	28 November 2014

== Election results ==
=== House of Representatives ===
Election	Leader	Constituency				Party list				Total		Position	Status
Election	Leader	Votes	%	Seats	+/-	Votes	%	Seats	+/-	Seats	+/-	Position	Status
2009	Yoshimi Watanabe	615,244	0.87	2 / 300	New	3,005,199	4.27	3 / 180	new	5 / 480	new	6th	Opposition
2012	Yoshimi Watanabe	2,807,244	4.71	4 / 300	▲2	5,245,586	8.77	14 / 180	▲9	18 / 480	▲13	5th	Opposition

=== House of Councillors ===
Election	Leader	Constituency				Party list				Seats				Position	Status
Election	Leader	Votes	%	Seats	+/-	Votes	%	Seats	+/-	Election	+/-	Total	+/-	Position	Status
2010	Yoshimi Watanabe	5,977,391	10.24	3 / 73	new	7,943,649	13.59	7 / 48	new	10 / 121	new	11 / 242	▲10	3rd	Opposition
2013	Yoshimi Watanabe	4,159,961	7.84	4 / 73	▲1	4,755,160	8.93	4 / 48	▼3	8 / 121	▼2	18 / 242	▲8	6th	Opposition
