= Chikako Asō =

Spouse of the Japanese Prime Minister from 2008 to 2009

- 麻生 千賀子 and 麻生 ちか子
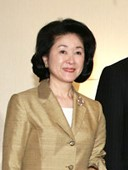
- Asō in 2008

Spouse of the Prime Minister of Japan
- In role September 24, 2008 – September 16, 2009
- Monarch: Akihito
- Prime Minister: Tarō Asō
- Preceded by: Kiyoko Fukuda
- Succeeded by: Miyuki Hatoyama

Personal details
- Born: Chikako Suzuki; May 30, 1950 (age 76) Tokyo, Japan
- Party: Liberal Democratic
- Spouse: Tarō Asō (m. 1983)
- Children: 2
- Parent: Zenkō Suzuki (father)
- Relatives: Shun'ichi Suzuki (brother)
- Education: Japan Women's University
- Occupation: Businesswoman

Chikako Asō (麻生 千賀子, also 麻生 ちか子) (Note: Asō's real name is the kanji form, 麻生 千賀子, but she uses the kana form, 麻生 ちか子, for things like signatures.) (born May 30, 1950), née Suzuki (鈴木 千賀子), is a Japanese businesswoman, daughter of the 44th Prime Minister of Japan, Zenkō Suzuki, wife of the 59th Prime Minister of Japan, Tarō Asō, and elder sister of the politician Shun'ichi Suzuki. Her husband is the brother of Princess Tomohito of Mikasa.

== Career ==
Asō is on the board of directors of Aso Cement, part of Aso Group, an Asō family-run conglomerate with divisions in mining, cement, medical care, theater, education, and the environmant. During World War II, Aso Mining used Koreans and prisoners of war (POWs) as slave labor under brutal conditions. After decades of seeking an apology, Asō's husband, Tarō Asō, finally admitted POWs had been used in the mines on December 18, 2008, but he refused to apologize.

Tarō was often on business in Tokyo, so Asō became the link between him and his constituency back in Fukuoka Prefecture on Kyushu Island. She spent three years learning the local dialect. She often campaigned for him in his hometown of Iizuka, where she is considered "more popular than Aso himself".

== Personal life ==
Asō was born May 30, 1950 in Tokyo to Zenkō Suzuki and Sachi Hagiwara. Suzuki was serving in the House of Representatives at the time and representing Iwate Prefecture's 1st district, which is where he was from. (Note: Asō's place of birth is also reported as Iwate Prefecture, but this seems to be a confusion as that is where her father was from and the prefecture he represented.) He later served as Japan's Prime Minister from July 17, 1980, to November 27, 1982. Her younger brother, Shun'ichi Suzuki is a politician. She graduated from the Home Economics Faculty of Japan Women's University.

Asō met her future husband, Tarō Asō, was invited to dinner with her family by her father Zenkō Suzuki while he was Prime Minister. Tarō was impressed with Chikako because she said he did not have to eat sea cucumber since he genuinely did not like it. (Note: This dinner might have been a Red Cross charity dinner.) They married on November 3, 1983. Tarō served as Prime Minister of Japan from September 24, 2008, to September 16, 2009. Tarō is Roman Catholic and he and Chikako and met Pope Benedict XVI. (Note: It is believed Chikako is also Roman Catholic.) Her husband is the brother of Princess Tomohito of Mikasa.

Tarō and Chikako have two children: Masahiro (麻生 将豊) (b. December 29, 1984) and Ayako (麻生 彩子) (b. April 27, 1987). Masahiro is the CEO of Aso Corporation, the holding company of Aso Group and the chairman of Junior Chamber International Japan, a youth leadership organization. Asō enjoys cooking and gardening, especially growing roses.

== Notes ==
Unofficial roles
Preceded by Kiyoko Fukuda	Spouse of the Prime Minister of Japan; 2008–2009	Succeeded by Miyuki Hatoyama
