= Suzuki Cabinet =

Suzuki Cabinet may refer to:

- Kantarō Suzuki Cabinet, the Japanese government led by Kantarō Suzuki in 1945
- Zenkō Suzuki Cabinet, the Japanese government led by Zenkō Suzuki from 1980 to 1982
