= Kiyoko Fukuda =

Kiyoko Fukuda may refer to:

- Kiyoko Fukuda (First Lady) (born 1944), spouse of the prime minister of Japan, wife of Yasuo Fukuda
- Kiyoko Fukuda (volleyball) (born 1970), Japanese former volleyball player
