= Dulles Intimidation =

The Dulles Intimidation refers to a negotiation tactic of U.S. Secretary of State John Foster Dulles, who pressured the Japanese delegates negotiating with the Soviet Union in 1956. In negotiating the content of the Soviet–Japanese Joint Declaration of 1956, one of the main issues was the resolution of the Kuril Islands dispute, and if the return of the four islands (Kunashiri, Etorofu, Shimai, and Shikotan) was not possible, only the two islands of Shimai and Shikotan were to be negotiated. However, U.S. Secretary of State Dulles pressured the Japanese government, saying, "If you give Kunashiri and Etorofu to the Soviet Union, the United States will claim Okinawa permanently," and negotiations for the return of the Northern Territories broke down.

== Background ==
Preliminary negotiations leading to the Soviet-Japanese Joint Declaration of the following year were held in London, England, from June to September 1955. Prime Minister Ichirō Hatoyama entrusted Shunichi Matsumoto, his plenipotentiary representative, with the task of negotiating the contents of the declaration in order to normalize diplomatic relations and, in particular, to resolve the Northern Territories issue.

Foreign Minister Mamoru Shigemitsu's instructions to plenipotentiary Matsumoto were (1) to return the four islands of Kunashiri, Etorofu, Habomai, and Shikotan, and (2) if the return of the four islands was difficult, to return the islands of Himai and Shikotan.

In the course of negotiations over the Soviet-Japanese Joint Declaration of 1956, the Soviet Union had decided to return the two northern islands to Japan on the premise that no U.S. military bases would be located on them.

Negotiations began on June 3 between Matsumoto and Soviet Ambassador to the United Kingdom Malik, who was the plenipotentiary of the Soviet side, and initially reached a stalemate as Japan insisted on the return of the four islands. However, in early August, the Soviet side offered to hand over the four islands to Japan, and it appeared that a compromise had been reached on the return of the two islands, but on June 27, the Ministry of Foreign Affairs issued a directive to return the four islands.

The U.S. is strongly wary of Japan and the Soviet Union moving closer together as the territorial issue develops, and on August 19, Foreign Minister Shigemitsu was pressured by Secretary of State Dulles at the U.S. Embassy in London that if Japan were to vest Kunashiri and Etorofu in the Soviet Union, Okinawa would become a U.S. territory.

As a result, Matsumoto Plenipotentiary returned to his stance of demanding the return of the four islands, including Kunashiri and Etorofu, and the Soviet side hardened its attitude, resulting in the breakdown of negotiations.

=== Evidence ===
A letter dated August 1956 was found in which Shunichi Matsumoto wrote to his wife that he had been pressured by the Soviet Union to take the Ryukyu Islands if the U.S. would take the Kuril Islands.

The record of this meeting is kept at the Ministry of Foreign Affairs. In February 2006, Muneo Suzuki asked the government whether the contents of Matsumoto's book were true, but the government avoided giving any clear answer, citing fears that the book might hinder future negotiations.
