= Jirō Ishiba =

Japanese politician (1908–1981)

- 石破 二朗
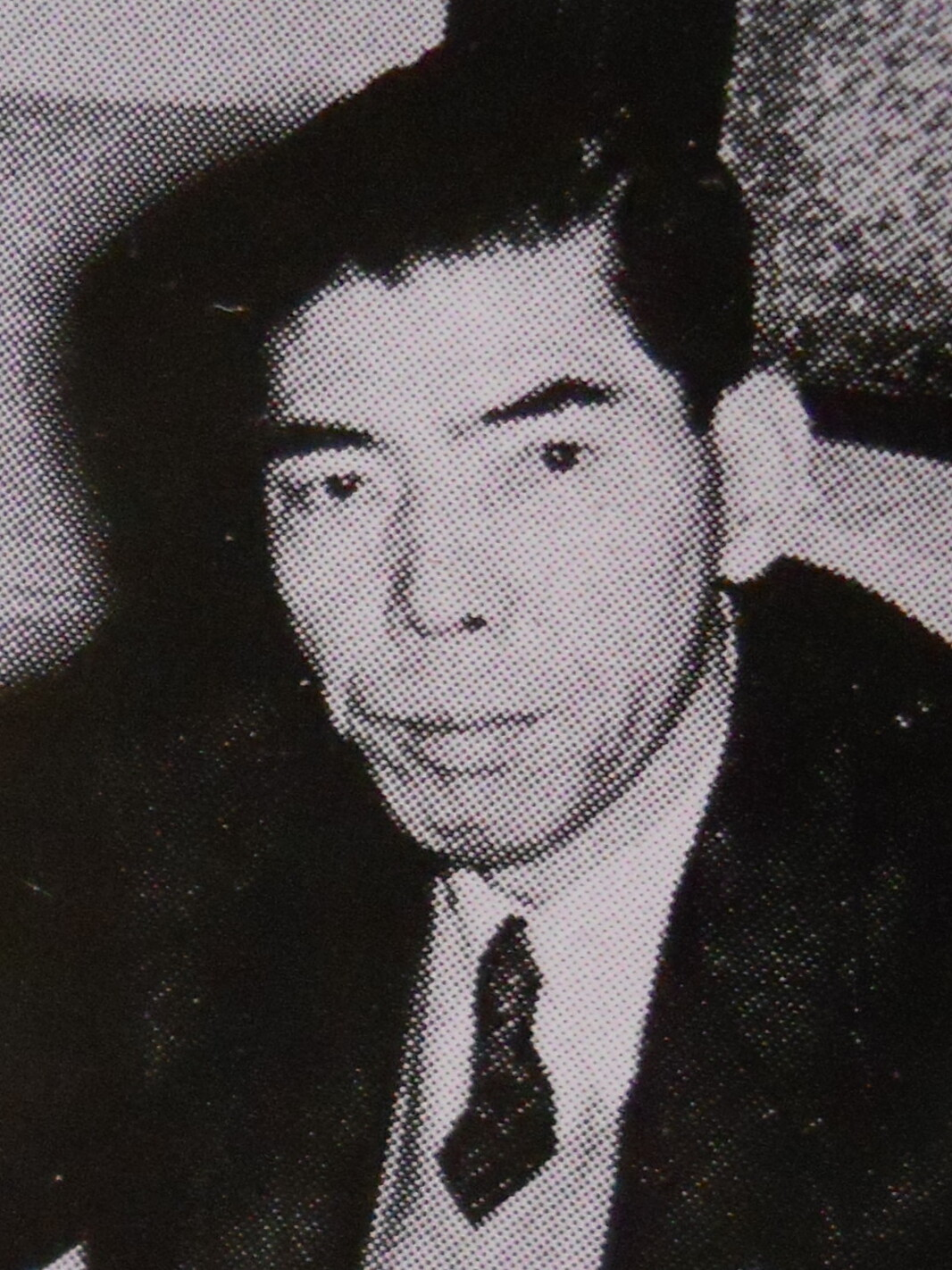
- Ishiba in 1956

Minister of Home Affairs and Chair of the National Public Safety Commission
- In office 17 July 1980 – 17 December 1980
- Prime Minister: Zenkō Suzuki
- Preceded by: Masaharu Gotōda
- Succeeded by: Tōkichi Abiko

Member of the House of Councillors for the Tottori at-large district
- In office 8 July 1974 – 16 September 1981
- Preceded by: Kaku Ashika
- Succeeded by: Kuniji Kobayashi

Governor of Tottori Prefecture
- In office 3 December 1958 – 22 February 1974
- Monarch: Hirohito
- Preceded by: Shigeru Endo
- Succeeded by: Kōzō Hirabayashi

Personal details
- Born: 29 July 1908 Yazu, Tottori, Japan
- Died: 16 September 1981 (aged 73) Tottori City, Tottori, Japan
- Party: Liberal Democratic
- Children: Shigeru Ishiba
- Education: Tokyo Imperial University

Jirō Ishiba (Japanese: 石破 二朗, Hepburn: Ishiba Jirō; 29 July 1908 – 16 September 1981) was a Japanese bureaucrat and politician who served as the governor of Tottori and as a member of the House of Councillors. He also held other high-ranking positions, including Minister of Home Affairs and Vice Minister of Construction. His son Shigeru Ishiba, served as the Prime Minister of Japan from 2024 to 2025.

== Early life and career ==
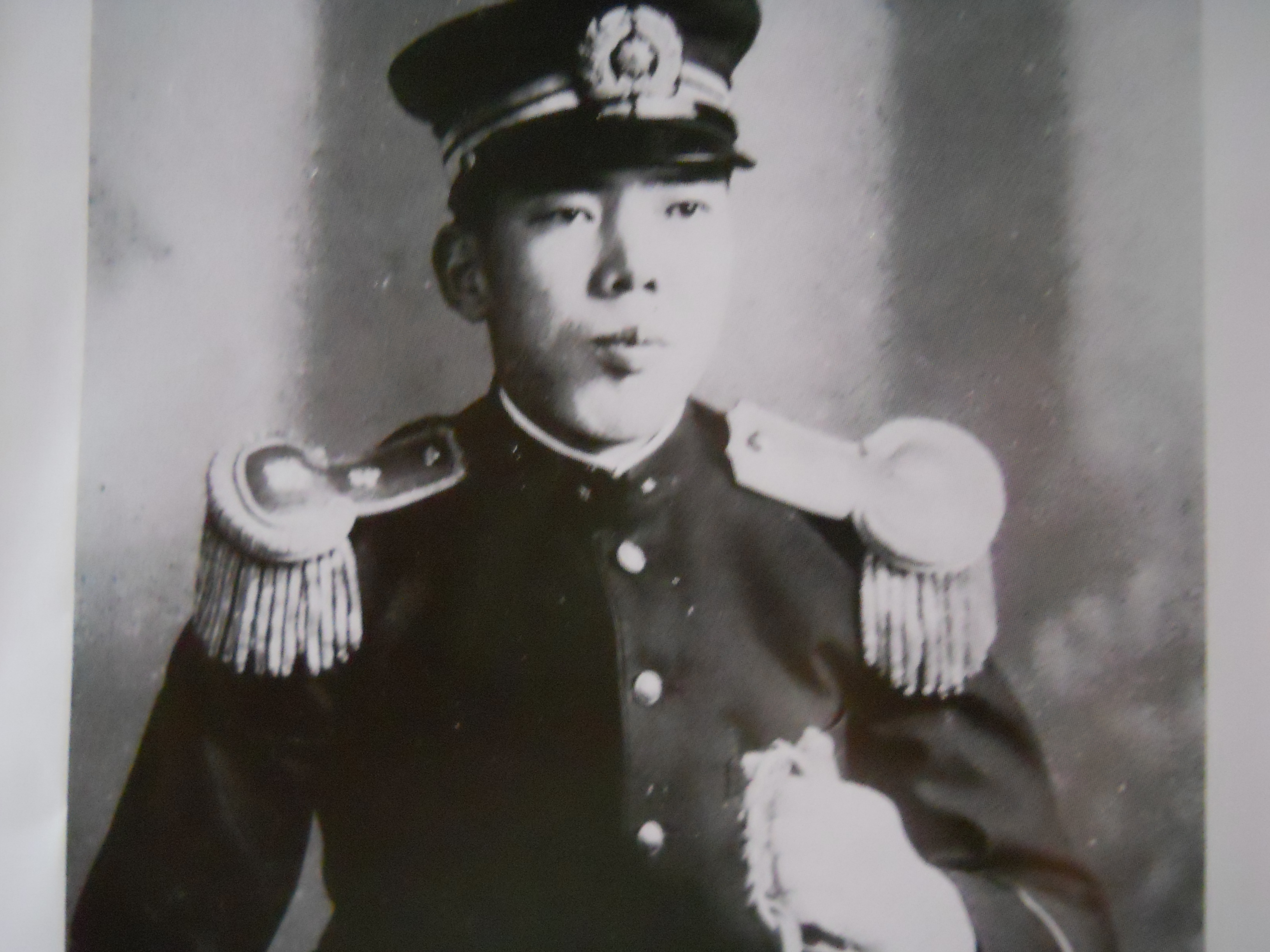
Ishiba during his police career in 1937

Ishiba was born on 29 July 1908. His father, Ichizo Ishiba, was a farmer who became the village chief in the year Jirō was born. He studied English law at the Faculty of Law, Tokyo Imperial University, and graduated in 1932.

He began his career as a bureaucrat at the Home Ministry but later transferred to the Metropolitan Police Department. He returned to the ministry in 1938, and during the Second World War, he was posted to Singapore, which had been occupied by the Japanese at an early stage of the war. After the war, he resumed his career at the Ministry of Construction, which had been spun off from the Home Ministry. He became Vice Minister, the highest office a bureaucrat can hold in a ministry, in 1955.

In 1958, he stood for the Tottori governorship election and was successfully elected. After serving for 16 years, he resigned in 1974 and was elected as a member of the House of Councillors. In July 1980, he was appointed Minister for Home Affairs in the Zenkō Suzuki Cabinet but had to step down when he was diagnosed with pancreatic cancer in December of the same year.

His funeral in Tokyo was organised by former prime minister Kakuei Tanaka, after which he instructed Ishiba's son and future prime minister, Shigeru, to stand for the general election.
