= Gunma 4th district =

Legislative district of Japan

Gunma 4th District
- 群馬県第4区
- Parliamentary constituency for the Japanese House of Representatives
- Prefecture: Gunma
- Proportional Block: Northern Kanto
- Electorate: 295,213 (as of 1 September 2022)

Current constituency
- Created: 1994
- Seats: One
- Party: LDP
- Representative: Tatsuo Fukuda

Gunma 4th district (群馬県第4区, Gunma-ken dai-yon-ku) is a single-member constituency of the House of Representatives in the Diet of Japan. It is located in Southern Gunma and consists of the city of Fujioka, the Southern part of Takasaki city (without the former municipalities of Gunma, Misato, Haruna and Kurabuchi) as well as Kanna town and Ueno village in Tano county. As of 2009, 292,356 eligible voters were registered in the district.

Before the electoral reform that took effect in 1996, the area was part of the multi-member Gunma 3rd district that elected four Representatives by single non-transferable vote.

Gunma is a "conservative kingdom" (hoshu ōkoku), a stronghold of the Liberal Democratic Party, and the pre-1996 multi-seat 3rd district had been home to the families of LDP presidents and Prime Ministers of Japan Yasuhiro Nakasone, Takeo Fukuda and Keizō Obuchi. The new 4th district's first representative was Fukuda's son Yasuo Fukuda (Machimura faction) who was elected LDP president and Prime Minister himself in 2007 over Tarō Asō (Asō faction). In the LDP's landslide defeat in 2009, Fukuda held his seat over Yukiko Miyake, one of the "Ozawa girls", a group of first-time female candidates handpicked by former Democratic Party president Ichirō Ozawa. Miyake easily won a seat in the Northern Kantō proportional representation block. She followed Ozawa out of the party in 2012 and ran for his Tomorrow Party of Japan in Democratic Party president Yoshihiko Noda's Chiba 4th district where she failed to win even a tenth of the vote, disqualifying her also for potential re-election in the proportional representation bloc.

In Gunma 4th district, Yasuo Fukuda retired in 2012 and was safely succeeded by his son Tatsuo.

== List of representatives ==
Representative	Party	Dates	Notes
Yasuo Fukuda	LDP	1996–2012	Prime Minister of Japan (2007-2008), retired in 2012
Tatsuo Fukuda	LDP	2012–	Son of Yasuo Fukuda

== Election results ==
2026
Party	Candidate	Votes	%	±%
LDP	Tatsuo Fukuda	84,938	53.4	▼2.64
Sanseitō	Hitomi Aoki (elected in N. Kanto PR block)	35,906	22.6	
Centrist Reform	Hiroki Yamada	28,627	18.0	▼14.69
JCP	Tatsuya Itō	16,129,556	6.0	▼5.28
Registered electors		289,300		
Turnout		159,027	56.25	▲4.79
LDP hold				

2024
Party	Candidate	Votes	%	±%
LDP	Tatsuo Fukuda (Endorsed by Kōmeitō)	80,130	56.04	▼8.98
CDP	Hiroki Yamada	46,740	32.69	▼2.20
JCP	Sadao Hagiwara	16,128	11.28	new
Registered electors		291,220		
Turnout		142,998	51.46	▼4.93
LDP hold				

2021
Party	Candidate	Votes	%	±%
LDP (Kōmeitō)	Tatsuo Fukuda	105,359	65.02	
CDP (SDP)	Kuniyoshi Suminokura	56,682	34.98	

2017
Party	Candidate	Votes	%	±%
LDP (Kōmeitō)	Tatsuo Fukuda	93,262	60.78	
Kibō no Tō (DPJ)	Hiroki Fuwa	36,167	23.57	

2012
Party	Candidate	Votes	%	±%
LDP (Kōmeitō, NRP)	Tatsuo Fukuda	93,220	55.7	
JRP	Ayaka Miyaharada	42,536	25.4	
DPJ	Kazuya Aoki	17,336	10.4	
JCP	Sadao Hagiwara	14,174	8.5	

2009
Party	Candidate	Votes	%	±%
LDP (Kōmeitō support)	Yasuo Fukuda	103,852	51.9	
DPJ (PNP support)	Yukiko Miyake (elected by PR)	91,904	45.9	
HRP	Takayuki Morita	4,315	2.2	
Turnout		205,416	70.72	

2005
Party	Candidate	Votes	%	±%
LDP	Yasuo Fukuda	118,517	62.8	
DPJ	Masaki Nakajima	56,364	29.9	
JCP	Etsuo Sakai	13,809	7.3	
Turnout		192,933	67.03	

2003
Party	Candidate	Votes	%	±%
LDP	Yasuo Fukuda	98,903	62.1	
DPJ	Yukio Tomioka	48,427	30.4	
JCP	Shinmei Ogasawara	11,815	7.4	
Turnout		164,403	57.5	

2000
Party	Candidate	Votes	%	±%
LDP	Yasuo Fukuda	94,517	57.7	
DPJ	Masaki Nakajima	49,063	29.9	
JCP	Kiyoko Nomura	20,284	12.4	

1996
Party	Candidate	Votes	%	±%
LDP	Yasuo Fukuda	73,674	46.0	
NFP	Minoru Komai	45,134	28.2	
DPJ	Masaki Nakajima	24,977	15.6	
JCP	Toshihiko Iizuka	16,425	10.3	
Turnout		166,505	60.47	

House of Representatives (Japan)
Preceded by Yamaguchi 4th district	Constituency represented by the prime minister 2007–2008	Succeeded by Fukuoka 8th district
