= Tanaka Tatsuo =

Japanese politician (1910–1998)

Tatsuo Tanaka
- 田中 龍夫
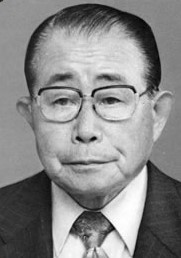
- Tanaka in 1980

Minister of Education
- In office 17 July 1980 – 30 November 1981
- Prime Minister: Zenko Suzuki
- Preceded by: Sen'ichi Tanigaki
- Succeeded by: Heiji Ogawa

Minister of International Trade and Industry
- In office 24 December 1976 – 28 November 1977
- Prime Minister: Takeo Fukuda
- Preceded by: Toshio Kōmoto
- Succeeded by: Toshio Kōmoto

Deputy Chief Cabinet Secretary (Political affairs)
- In office 12 July 1957 – 14 June 1958
- Prime Minister: Nobusuke Kishi
- Preceded by: Naokichi Kitazawa
- Succeeded by: Shunichi Matsumoto

Member of the House of Representatives
- In office 20 April 1953 – 24 January 1990
- Preceded by: Sadaichi Nishikawa
- Succeeded by: Takeo Kawamura
- Constituency: Yamaguchi 1st

Governor of Yamaguchi Prefecture
- In office 16 April 1947 – 24 March 1953
- Monarch: Hirohito
- Preceded by: Ichirō Aoyagi
- Succeeded by: Tarō Ozawa

Member of the House of Peers
- In office 11 May 1946 – 2 May 1947 Elected by the Barons

Personal details
- Born: 20 September 1910 Hagi, Yamaguchi, Japan
- Died: 30 March 1998 (aged 87)
- Resting place: Tama Cemetery
- Party: Liberal Democratic
- Other political affiliations: Independent (1946–1954); Democratic (1954–1955)
- Children: 3
- Parent: Tanaka Giichi (father)
- Education: Tokyo Imperial University

Tanaka Tatsuo (Japanese: 田中 龍夫, Tanaka Tatsuo; 20 September 1910 – 30 March 1998) was a Japanese politician and baron who served as Minister of Education from 1980 to 1981 and Minister of International Trade and Industry from 1976 to 1977.

He was the eldest son of Prime Minister Tanaka Giichi.

== Early life and education ==
Born on 20 September 1910, in Hagi, Yamaguchi, Japan, Tanaka was the eldest son of Tanaka Giichi, a general in the Imperial Japanese Army and future prime minister of Japan. After attending Gyosei High School, he entered Urawa High School (now Saitama University) and later enrolled in the Tokyo Imperial University. During this time, he inherited the title of baron following his father's death. He also married Takahashi Setsuko.

== Bureaucratic career ==
After graduating from Tokyo Imperial University in 1937, Tanaka joined the South Manchuria Railway. He later served as a researcher in the Planning Agency, a bureaucrat in the Ministry of Munitions, and a secretary to Minister of Agriculture and Commerce Shimada Toshio during the Koiso Cabinet.

Following the end of World War II, Tanaka was appointed as a secretary to Minister of Commerce and Industry Ogasawara Mikio in the Shidehara Cabinet.

== Political career ==
On 11 May 1946, he was elected to the House of Peers as a baron, where he served until its abolition on 2 May 1947. That same year, he was elected as the first governor of Yamaguchi Prefecture under the public election system.

In 1953, Tanaka resigned as governor midway through his second term to run as an independent candidate in the 26th House of Representatives election. He was elected from the old Yamaguchi 1st district and subsequently joined the Japan Liberal Party. He later followed Nobusuke Kishi, his senior from the same prefecture, into the newly formed Japan Democratic Party.

Tanaka joined the Liberal Democratic Party (LDP) upon its formation through a merger of conservative parties. He held various positions including Minister of International Trade and Industry during the Takeo Fukuda Cabinet, and Minister of Education during the Zenkō Suzuki Cabinet (17 July 1980 – 30 November 1981). In 1981, he was appointed as the LDP General Council Chairman under Prime Minister Zenkō Suzuki.

== Later life and death ==
Tanaka retired from politics following the dissolution of the House of Representatives in 1990. That same year, he was awarded the Grand Cordon of the Order of the Rising Sun. He died on 30 March 1998, at the age of 87. He is buried in Tama Cemetery.
