= Iwate 2nd district =

Japan House of Representatives constituency

Iwate 2nd District
- Parliamentary constituency for the Japanese House of Representatives
- Numbered map of Iwate Prefecture single-member districts
- Prefecture: Iwate
- Proportional District: Tohoku
- Electorate: 340,058

Current constituency
- Created: 1994
- Seats: One
- Party: LDP
- Representative: Shun'ichi Suzuki

Iwate 2nd district is a single-member constituency of the House of Representatives in the National Diet of Japan located in Iwate Prefecture. As of 2020, the district was home to 376,270 constituents.

The area was for a long time the location of the political support base of former prime minister Zenkō Suzuki and, for most of its existence, the 2nd district has been represented by his son Shun'ichi Suzuki, former Minister of Finance.

== 2011 earthquake and tsunami ==
The impact of the 2011 Tōhoku earthquake and tsunami was concentrated in Fukushima, Miyagi, and Iwate prefectures. As the 2nd district contains all of Iwate's coastline, it was hit the hardest of Iwate's three districts and was one of the worst affected districts in all of Japan.

== Area ==
The district spans Eastern and Northern Iwate. It is the largest Lower House electoral district on the island of Honshu, roughly 7000 km^{2}, more than three times the size of Tokyo Metropolis. After redistricting in 2017, it includes a large area that was previously of part of the Iwate 3rd district.

=== Cities ===
- Miyako
- Ōfunato
- Kuji
- Tōno
- Rikuzentakata
- Kamaishi
- Ninohe
- Hachimantai
- Takizawa

=== Districts ===
- Iwate
- Kesen
- Kamihei
- Shimohei
- Kunohe
- Ninohe

== List of representatives ==
Representative	Party	Dates	Notes
Shun'ichi Suzuki	LDP	1996 – 2009	Lost re-election
Kōji Hata	DPJ	2009 – 2012	Won a seat in PR block
Shun'ichi Suzuki	LDP	2012 –	

== Election results ==
2026
Party	Candidate	Votes	%	±%
LDP	Shun'ichi Suzuki	123,711	64.8	▲2.7
Centrist Reform	Makoto Sasaki (Won a seat in the PR Block	67,294	35.2	▼2.7
Registered electors		340,058		
Turnout		191,005	58.10	▲2.96
LDP hold				

2024
Party	Candidate	Votes	%	±%
LDP	Shun'ichi Suzuki	115,774	62.1	▼5.9
CDP	Yukiko Nakamura	70,716	37.9	▲7.5
Registered electors		349,223		
Turnout			55.14	▼5.14
LDP hold				
