= Alistair Urquhart =

Scottish writer and WWII POW (1919–2016)

- Born: 8 September 1919; Newtonhill, Aberdeenshire, Scotland
- Died: 7 October 2016 (aged 97); Dundee, Scotland
- Occupations: Businessman and author
- Known for: Japanese prisoner of war
- Notable work: The Forgotten Highlander

Alistair Urquhart (/ˈælɪstər ˈɜːrkərt/ AL-ist-ər UR-kərt; 8 September 1919 – 7 October 2016) was a Scottish businessman and the author of The Forgotten Highlander, an account of the years he spent as a Japanese prisoner of war during his service in the Gordon Highlanders infantry regiment during the Second World War.

== Military career ==
Urquhart was born in Newtonhill, Aberdeenshire in 1919. He was conscripted into the British Army in 1939, at the age of 19, and served with the Gordon Highlanders stationed at Fort Canning in Singapore. He was taken prisoner when the Japanese invaded the island during the Battle of Singapore, which lasted from December 1941 to February 1942. He was sent to work on the Burma Railway, built by the Empire of Japan to support its forces in the Burma campaign and referred to as "Death Railway" because of the tens of thousands of forced labourers who died during its construction. While working on the railway Urquhart suffered malnutrition, cholera and torture at the hands of his captors.

After working on the railway and in the docks in Singapore, Urquhart was loaded into the hold of the Kachidoki Maru, an American passenger and cargo ship captured by the Japanese and put to use as a "hell ship" transporting hundreds of prisoners. The ship was part of a convoy bound for Japan; on the voyage prisoners endured more illness, dehydration, and instances of cannibalism. On 12 September 1944, the ship was torpedoed and sunk by the US submarine USS Pampanito, whose commander was unaware of its cargo of prisoners. Urquhart was burned and covered in oil when the ship went down, and swallowed some oil which caused permanent damage to his vocal cords. He floated in a single-man raft for five days without food or water before being picked up by a Japanese whaling ship and taken to Japan.

In Japan, Urquhart was sent to work in coal mines belonging to the Aso Mining Company and later a labour camp ten miles from the city of Nagasaki. He was there when the city was hit with an atomic bomb by the United States.

== Post-war ==
In 2010, Urquhart published The Forgotten Highlander: My Incredible Story of Survival During the War in the Far East, an account of his experiences. In the book he expresses anger at the lack of recognition in Japan of its role in war crimes compared to the atonement in Germany. He resided in Broughty Ferry, Dundee, for many years and died on 7 October 2016, aged 97.
