= SoftBank (disambiguation) =

SoftBank may refer to:

- SoftBank Group, a Japanese multinational conglomerate holding company headquartered in Minato, Tokyo. SoftBank owns stakes in many technology, energy, and financial companies. It also runs Vision Fund
  - SoftBank Vision Fund, the world's largest technology-focused venture capital fund, with over $100 billion in capital
- SoftBank Capital, a venture capital group in the United States, focusing on technology and telecom early stage businesses. It was founded by SoftBank
- SoftBank Creative, or SB Creative Corp., a Japanese publishing company and a subsidiary of the SoftBank telecommunications company
- SoftBank Telecom, previously as Japan Telecom Co. Ltd., was a Japanese telephone company of the SoftBank group. On 1 April 2015 Softbank Telecom Corp. merged into Softbank Mobile Corp. and ceased to exist as a separate entity.

== See also ==
- SoftBank Tomatoh Abira Solar Park, a solar power generating station in Abira, Hokkaido, Japan
- Fukuoka SoftBank Hawks, a Japanese baseball team based in Fukuoka, Fukuoka Prefecture
