= Tatsuo Fukuda =

Japanese politician

- 福田 達夫
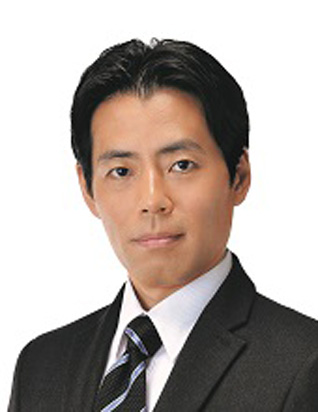
- Official portrait, 2017

Member of the House of Representatives
- Incumbent
- Assumed office 16 December 2012
- Preceded by: Yasuo Fukuda
- Constituency: Gunma 4th
- Majority: 105,359 (65,02%)

Personal details
- Born: 5 March 1967 (age 59) Tokyo, Japan
- Party: Liberal Democratic
- Parents: Yasuo Fukuda (father); Kiyoko Fukuda (mother)
- Relatives: Takeo Fukuda (grandfather)
- Education: Keio University

Tatsuo Fukuda (福田達夫, Fukuda Tatsuo; born 5 March 1967) is a Japanese politician who currently serves as a member of the House of Representatives for the Liberal Democratic Party. He previously serves chairman of the General Council of the ruling Liberal Democratic Party from 2024–2025. He is the son of former Prime Minister Yasuo Fukuda and grandson of former Prime Minister Takeo Fukuda.

== Early life and career ==
Tatsuo Fukuda was born on 5 March 1967 in Tokyo, Japan. Fukuda graduated from Keio University and subsequently studied at the School of Advanced International Studies at Johns Hopkins University. Following a decade as an employee of the Mitsubishi Corporation, Fukuda served as a secretary for his father, Yasuo, when he was chief cabinet secretary. Upon his father's ascension to the prime ministership in 2007, Fukuda served as his secretary.

== Political career ==
Following his father's retirement in 2012, Fukuda was elected to the House of Representatives in the 2012 General Election, representing Gunma 4th District. He was a member of the Seiwa Seisaku Kenkyūkai, the then largest faction in the Liberal Democratic Party.

=== Kishida government ===
Following his victory in the 2021 Liberal Democratic Party Leadership Election, Fumio Kishida appointed Fukuda chairman of the Liberal Democratic Party's General Council.

In 2022, following the assassination of former Prime Minister Shinzo Abe, Fukuda dismissed scrutiny emanating from revelations of connections between the Unification Church and his fellow party members, stating: "frankly speaking, I don’t really know what the problem is." Fukuda went on to add he had no connections with the organisation.
