= Shun'ichi Suzuki (politician) =

Japanese politician (born 1953)

- 鈴木 俊一
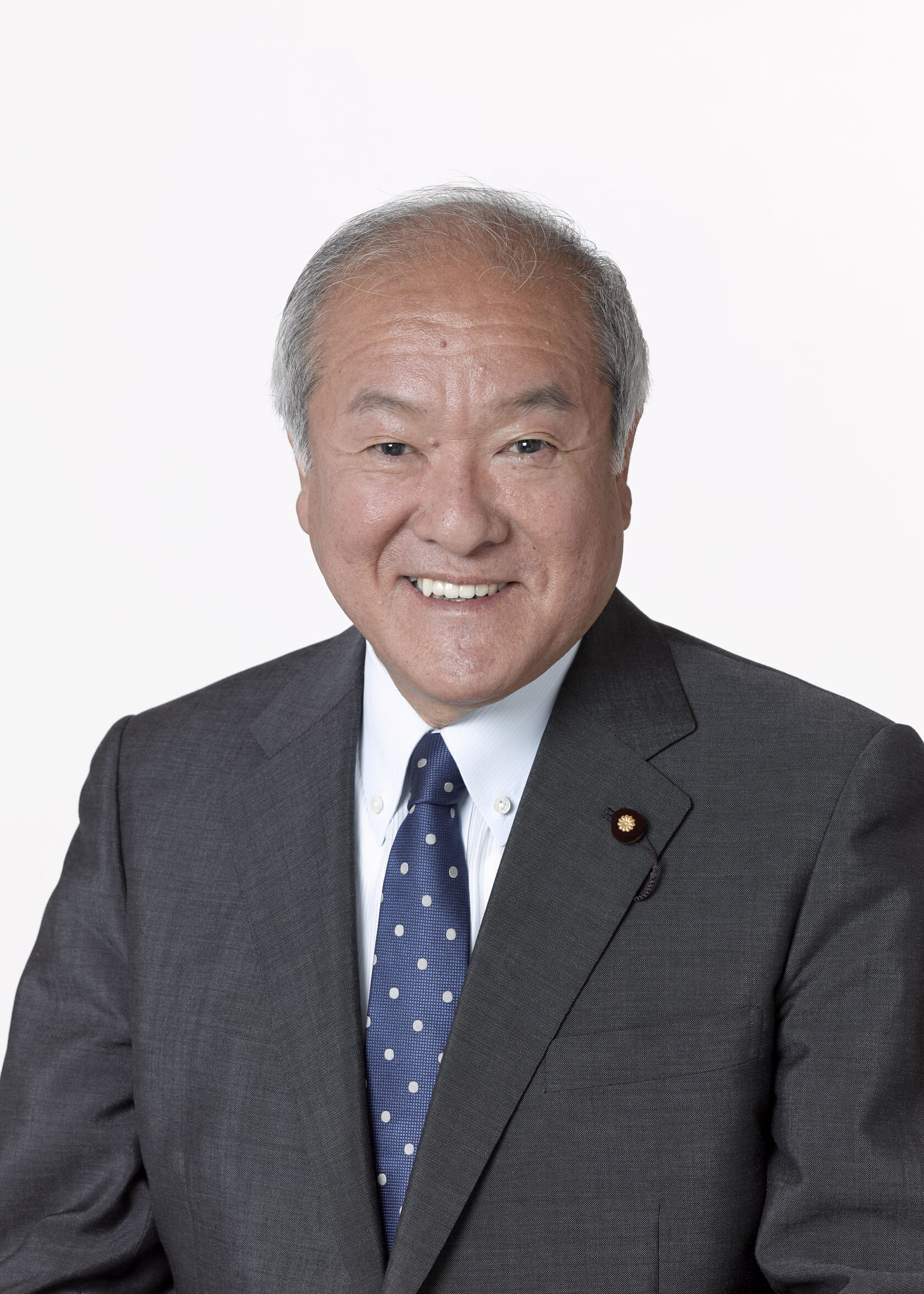
- Official portrait, 2021

Secretary-General of the Liberal Democratic Party
- Incumbent
- Assumed office 7 October 2025
- President: Sanae Takaichi
- Vice President: Tarō Asō
- Preceded by: Hiroshi Moriyama
Ministerial offices
Minister of Finance
In office 4 October 2021 – 1 October 2024
Prime Minister	Fumio Kishida
Preceded by	Tarō Asō
Succeeded by	Katsunobu Katō
Minister for the Tokyo Olympic and Paralympic Games
In office 10 April 2019 – 11 September 2019
Prime Minister	Shinzo Abe
Preceded by	Yoshitaka Sakurada
Succeeded by	Seiko Hashimoto
In office 3 August 2017 – 2 October 2018
Prime Minister	Shinzo Abe
Preceded by	Tamayo Marukawa
Succeeded by	Yoshitaka Sakurada
Minister of the Environment
In office 30 September 2002 – 22 September 2003
Prime Minister	Junichiro Koizumi
Preceded by	Hiroshi Ohki
Succeeded by	Yuriko Koike

Member of the House of Representatives
- Incumbent
- Assumed office 17 December 2012
- Preceded by: Kōji Hata
- Constituency: Iwate 2nd
- In office 19 February 1990 – 21 July 2009
- Preceded by: Zenkō Suzuki
- Succeeded by: Kōji Hata
- Constituency: Iwate 1st (1990–1996); Iwate 2nd (1996–2009)

Personal details
- Born: 13 April 1953 (age 73) Tokyo, Japan
- Party: Liberal Democratic (Shikōkai)
- Spouse: Atsuko Suzuki
- Children: 2
- Parent: Zenkō Suzuki (father)
- Relatives: Tarō Asō (brother-in-law)
- Education: Waseda University

Shun'ichi Suzuki (鈴木 俊一, Suzuki Shun'ichi; born 13 April 1953) is a Japanese politician who has served as Secretary-General of the Liberal Democratic Party since 2025 and previously served as minister of finance from 2021 to October 2024. He sits in the House of Representatives as a member of the Liberal Democratic Party.

== Background and career ==
Suzuki was born on 13 April 1953 on Tokyo, the son of Zenko Suzuki, a diet member from Iwate Prefecture who rose to serve as prime minister from 1980 to 1982. His elder sister Chikako is married to Tarō Asō. Suzuki graduated from Waseda University in 1977, and was employed by the National Federation of Fisheries Co-operative Associations. In April 1985, he became secretary to his father.

Suzuki was elected to the House of Representatives for the first time in 1990, when his father retired. He served as Minister of the Environment from 2002 to 2003 under Prime Minister Jun'ichirō Koizumi.

Suzuki served as Minister for the Tokyo Olympic and Paralympic Games twice under Prime Minister Shinzo Abe.

Suzuki was Minister of Finance under Prime Minister Fumio Kishida from 2021 to 2024. He authorised foreign-exchange interventions to counter the sharp depreciation of the yen.

After Sanae Takaichi was elected as LDP president in October 2025, she appointed Suzuki as secretary general.

== Political positions ==
Suzuki is affiliated to the openly revisionist lobby Nippon Kaigi, and is a member of the Shikōkai faction of the LDP. He gave the following answers to the questionnaire submitted by Mainichi to parliamentarians in 2012:

- in favor of the revision of the Constitution
- in favor of the right of collective self-defense (revision of Article 9)
- against the reform of the national legislature (unicameral instead of bicameral)
- in favor of reactivating nuclear power plants
- against the goal of zero nuclear power by 2030s
- in favor of the relocation of Marine Corps Air Station Futenma (Okinawa)
- in favor of evaluating the purchase of Senkaku Islands by the Government
- in favor of a strong attitude versus China
- against the participation of Japan to the Trans-Pacific Partnership
- against a nuclear-armed Japan
- against the reform of the Imperial Household that would allow women to retain their Imperial status even after marriage

== Scandal ==
- Opposition to the indoor smoking ban in his position as Minister of the Olympics: Suzuki has long been opposed to an indoor smoking ban, and immediately after his appointment as Minister of the Olympics in August 2017, he repeated statements such as, "Smoking should not be a principle, but should be achieved through thorough separation of smoking." He also said that he was opposed to a smoking ban indoors. Since this was contrary to the policies of the IOC and WHO, which promote a tobacco-free Olympics, the fact that he made the statement in his capacity as Minister of the Olympics was viewed as problematic. When questioned by the press about his consistency, he effectively retracted his statement, saying that it was "an introduction to past discussions within the Liberal Democratic Party."

== Personal life ==
Suzuki and his wife belong to political dynasties: former Prime Ministers Zenkō Suzuki and Tarō Asō are respectively his father and his brother-in-law; his wife Chikako is related to Heikichi Ogawa and Prime Minister Kiichi Miyazawa.

House of Representatives (Japan)
Preceded by Zenkō Suzuki	Representatives for former Iwate 1st and Iwate 2nd 1990–2009	Succeeded by Kōji Hata
Preceded by Kōji Hata	Representatives for Iwate 2nd 2012–present	Incumbent
Political offices
Preceded by Hiroshi Ohki	Minister of the Environment; 2002–2003	Succeeded by Yuriko Koike
Preceded by Tamayo Marukawa	Minister for the Tokyo Olympic and Paralympic Games; 2017–2018	Succeeded by Yoshitaka Sakurada
Preceded by Yoshitaka Sakurada	Minister for the Tokyo Olympic and Paralympic Games; 2019	Succeeded by Seiko Hashimoto
Preceded by Tarō Asō	Minister of Finance; 2021–2024	Succeeded by Katsunobu Katō
Party political offices
Preceded by Katsunobu Katō	Chairman of the General Council, Liberal Democratic Party; 2019–2020	Succeeded by Tsutomu Sato
Preceded by Hiroshi Moriyama	Chairman of the General Council, Liberal Democratic Party; 2024–2025	Succeeded by Haruko Arimura
Preceded by Hiroshi Moriyama	Secretary-General of the Liberal Democratic Party; 2025–present	Incumbent
Non-profit organization positions
Preceded by Yūji Tsushima	Chairman of the Chidorigafuchi National Cemetery Memorial Foundation; 2021–2026	Succeeded by Yoshitaka Shindo
