= The Forgotten Highlander =

Biography of Alistair Urquhart

- Author: Alistair Urquhart
- Genre: War Non-Fiction
- Publisher: Little, Brown & Company, Abacus
- Publication date: February 25, 2010
- Media type: Paperback Ebook Audiobook
- Pages: 320
- Awards: Short-listed for Independent Booksellers Award 2011 (UK).
- ISBN: 0-349-12257-1

The Forgotten Highlander: My Incredible Story of Survival During the War in the Far East is a memoir of Alistair Urquhart describing his three and a half years spent as a Japanese prisoner of war during his service in the Gordon Highlanders infantry regiment during the Second World War.

The book was first published on 25 February 2010. His story garnered national attention, with many publications writing about Urquhart and his story.

He was 92 when he wrote the book in 2010, having been silent for more than 60 years, saying he did not want people to forget humanity's inhumanities.

The book was exclusively sold in The Gordon Highlanders Museum, but soon grew in popularity for its honest account of his experience as a Japanese POW. The book went on to be a Sundays Times Best Seller in 2011. The proceeds from the book were donated to the Gordon Highlanders Museum.

In 2011, the book was shortlisted for the Independent Booksellers Award (UK)

== Summary ==
Alistair Urquhart was conscripted into the British Army at nineteen. His father was a veteran of The Battle of the Somme.

Alistair Urquhart was a soldier in the Gordon Highlanders captured by the Japanese while stationed in Singapore. He survived the labour of the Bridge on the River Kwai, and was eventually taken on one of the Japanese ‘hellships’ which was torpedoed enroute to Japan. Almost everyone on board died and Alistair Urquhart spent 5 days alone on a raft in the South China Sea. He was eventually rescued by a whaling ship and was taken to Japan, and forced to work in a mine close to Nagasaki. Two months after his arrival a nuclear bomb was dropped just ten miles away by the United States.

== Reception ==
In 2016, GQ magazine released an article in which Bear Grylls told of his favourite books: The Forgotten Highlander was included.
