= Yasuo Fukuda =

Prime Minister of Japan from 2007 to 2008

- 福田 康夫
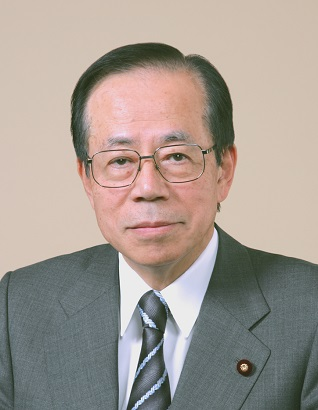
- Official portrait, 2007

Prime Minister of Japan
- In office 26 September 2007 – 24 September 2008
- Monarch: Akihito
- Preceded by: Shinzo Abe
- Succeeded by: Tarō Asō

President of the Liberal Democratic Party
- In office 23 September 2007 – 22 September 2008
- Secretary-General: Bunmei Ibuki; Tarō Asō
- Preceded by: Shinzo Abe
- Succeeded by: Tarō Asō

Chief Cabinet Secretary
- In office 27 October 2000 – 7 May 2004
- Prime Minister: Yoshirō Mori; Junichiro Koizumi
- Preceded by: Hidenao Nakagawa
- Succeeded by: Hiroyuki Hosoda

Director-General of the Okinawa Development Agency
- In office 27 October 2000 – 5 December 2000
- Prime Minister: Yoshirō Mori
- Preceded by: Hidenao Nakagawa
- Succeeded by: Ryutaro Hashimoto

Member of the House of Representatives
- In office 18 February 1990 – 16 November 2012
- Preceded by: Takeo Fukuda
- Succeeded by: Tatsuo Fukuda
- Constituency: Gunma 3rd (1990–1996); Gunma 4th (1996–2012)

Personal details
- Born: 16 July 1936 Takasaki, Japan
- Died: 22 October 2026 (aged 90) Tokyo, Japan
- Party: Liberal Democratic
- Spouse: Kiyoko Fukuda (m. 1966)
- Children: Tatsuo
- Parent: Takeo Fukuda (father)
- Education: Waseda University

Yasuo Fukuda (福田 康夫, Fukuda Yasuo; 16 July 1936 – 22 October 2026) was a Japanese politician who served as Prime Minister of Japan from 2007 to 2008. He was previously the longest-serving Chief Cabinet Secretary in Japanese history, serving in that role from 2000 to 2004 under prime ministers Yoshirō Mori and Junichiro Koizumi. His record was surpassed by Yoshihide Suga, who served almost twice as long.

Following the resignation of Prime Minister Shinzo Abe, Fukuda was elected as President of the Liberal Democratic Party and became prime minister in September 2007. Fukuda was also the first son of a former Japanese prime minister (Takeo Fukuda) to also take up the post. On 1 September 2008, Fukuda announced his resignation as party leader, and was succeeded by Tarō Asō. Although Japan hosted the G8 summit meeting without mishap during Fukuda's time in office, he himself earned little or no credit from ordinary Japanese, and when he resigned, he became the first of the G8 leaders to leave office.

== Early life ==
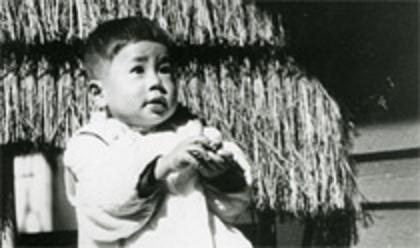
Fukuda as a child

Fukuda was born in Takasaki, Gunma, the eldest son of politician (later the 67th Prime Minister) Takeo Fukuda. He grew up in Tokyo, moving in September 1942 with his mother and younger brother to Nanjing, China, where his father was working as a fiscal policy adviser to the Wang Jingwei regime. Due to worsening conditions because of the war, the family left Nanjing after a few months and returned to Tokyo. The family later evacuated to Takasaki, returning to Tokyo after the surrender of Japan and settling in Setagaya. Fukuda completed his secondary education at Azabu High School and graduated from Waseda University in 1959 with a degree in economics. After graduating from that university, he joined Maruzen Petroleum (now part of the Cosmo Oil Company). He was only minimally involved in politics over the next seventeen years, working his way up to section chief as a typical Japanese "salaryman". He was posted to the United States from 1962 to 1964. While his father Takeo Fukuda was prime minister from 1976 to 1978, Yasuo became a political secretary. From 1978 to 1989, he was a director of the Kinzai Institute for Financial Affairs, serving as a trustee from 1986 on.

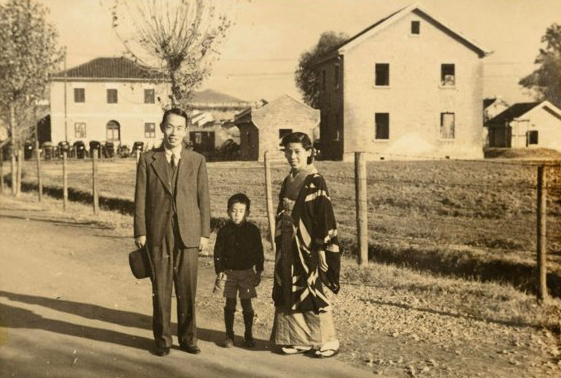
Fukuda with his father, Takeo, and mother, Mie, in Nanjing in 1942

He also served as president of the Japanese Canoe Federation prior to his September 2007 election as prime minister.

== Political career ==
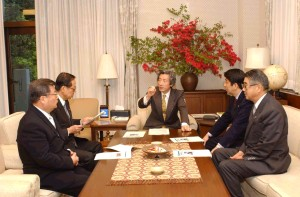
Fukuda with Junichiro Koizumi, Shinzo Abe, Kōsei Ueno and Teijirō Furukawa (at the Prime Minister's Official Residence on 26 April 2002)

Fukuda ran for the House of Representatives in 1990 and won a seat. He was elected deputy director of the Liberal Democratic Party in 1997 and became Chief Cabinet Secretary to Yoshirō Mori in October 2000. He resigned his position as Chief Cabinet Secretary on 7 May 2004 amid a large political scandal related to the Japanese pension system.

He was considered a contender for the leadership of the LDP in 2006, but, on 21 July, he decided that he would not seek the nomination. Instead, Shinzō Abe succeeded Junichirō Koizumi as leader of the LDP and Prime Minister of Japan. One of his most noted policy goals was to end prime ministerial visits to Yasukuni Shrine. In June 2006, Fukuda joined 134 other lawmakers in proposing a secular alternative to the shrine, citing constitutional concerns.

=== Premiership (2007–2008) ===
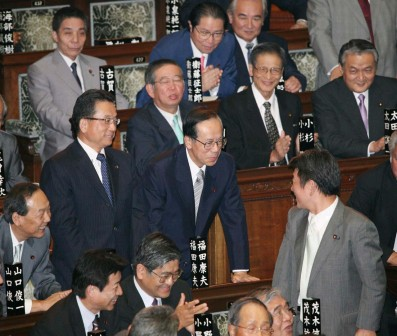
Fukuda was designated as Prime Minister by the House of Representatives (at the National Diet Building on 25 September 2007)

Following Abe's resignation in September 2007, Fukuda announced that he would run in the Liberal Democratic Party leadership election, which would also determine the prime minister, given the LDP's majority in the House of Representatives.

Fukuda received a great deal of support in his bid, including that of the LDP's largest faction, led by Foreign Minister Nobutaka Machimura, of which Fukuda was a member. Finance Minister Fukushiro Nukaga, who initially had intended to run for the leadership, also backed Fukuda. Fukuda's only competitor for the leadership, Tarō Asō, publicly acknowledged the likelihood of his own defeat a week before the election.

In the election, on 23 September, Fukuda defeated Aso, receiving 330 votes against Aso's 197. Fukuda was formally elected as Japan's 91st prime minister on 25 September. He received 338 votes, almost 100 more than necessary for a majority, in the House of Representatives; although the House of Councillors (the upper house), led by the opposition Democratic Party, elected Ichirō Ozawa over Fukuda by a margin of 133 to 106. This deadlock was then resolved in favor of the lower house's choice, according to Article 67 of the Constitution.

Fukuda and his cabinet were formally sworn in by Emperor Akihito on 26 September.

==== Refueling debate ====
One of the major issues during Fukuda's first months in office was the status of Japan's Indian Ocean refueling mission. After the 11 September attacks and the subsequent invasion of Afghanistan, the Diet passed a bill that allowed Japanese oil tankers to provide fuel for U.S. ships involved in military operations. When Fukuda became prime minister he vowed to continue the mission, this despite the fact that the DPJ which opposed the authorization bill now had a majority in the upper house. After several months of debate and aborted attempts at compromise the upper house rejected the bill to continue the mission. However, the bill ultimately became law as Fukuda used the LDP's 2/3 majority in the lower house to win successful passage for the bill.

==== Censure motion ====
On 11 June 2008, a non-binding censure motion was passed by parliament's opposition-controlled upper house against Fukuda. Filed by the Democratic Party of Japan and two other parties, it was the first censure motion against a prime minister under Japan's post-war constitution. Ahead of the G8 summit, it attacked his handling of domestic issues including an unpopular medical plan and called for a snap election or his resignation.

==== Motion of confidence ====
On 12 June, a motion of confidence was passed by the lower house's ruling coalition to counter the censure.

=== Sudden resignation ===
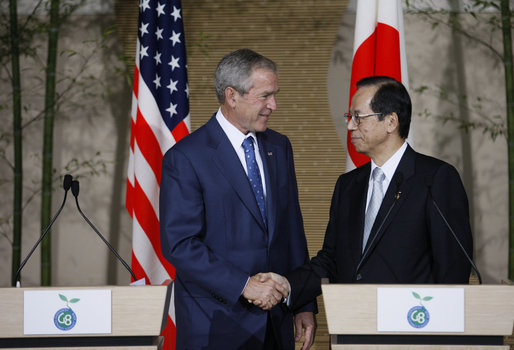
Fukuda with U.S. president George W. Bush (at the Windsor Hotel Toya Resort and Spa on 6 July 2008)

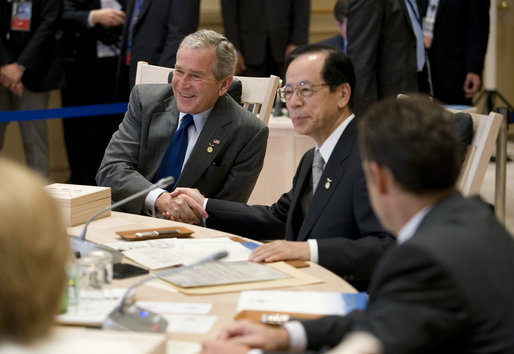
Fukuda with leaders of the G8 (at the G8 summit on 8 July 2008)

On 1 September 2008, Fukuda announced his resignation, citing reasons related to improving the flow of the political process. The sudden announcement began with a call for an emergency press conference issued at 6:00 pm, with the purpose not disclosed until 10 minutes prior to its scheduled start. The resignation was widely compared to the sudden resignation of Abe a year earlier. Fukuda said that while Abe's resignation was for health reasons, his own resignation was motivated by a desire to remove impediments to legislative and political process due to deadlock between his party and the opposition-controlled upper house of the Diet.

His resignation led to another leadership election within the LDP. Tarō Asō was viewed as the likely front-runner to replace Fukuda, and was elected a week later. His popularity was hit by a controversial medical plan for elderly people, falling below 30% at one stage. He said:

Today, I have decided to resign. We need a new line-up to cope with a new session of parliament. My decision is based on what I thought the future political situation ought to be. The Democratic Party has tried to stall every bill so it has taken a long time to implement any policies. For the sake of the Japanese people, this should not be repeated. If we are to prioritize the people's livelihoods, there cannot be a political vacuum from political bargaining, or a lapse in policies. We need a new team to carry out policies.

Taro Aso was elected to succeed Fukuda as LDP President on 22 September. Fukuda and his cabinet resigned en masse on 24 September 2008, to make way for a new Cabinet headed by Aso. Aso was elected as prime minister by the National Diet on the same day.

=== Post-premiership (2008–2026) ===
==== Diplomacy ====
Fukuda did not run in the 2012 general election and retired from politics. In June 2014, he visited Beijing for secret meetings with People's Republic of China government officials. The meeting was seen as the first after nearly 18 months between a senior Japanese political leader and PRC officials. During the meeting, Fukuda was passed the message that PRC leader Xi Jinping wanted to meet with the Japanese Prime Minister Shinzō Abe. Following this, in late July Fukuda conveyed the details of the discussion to Abe. On getting the consent from Abe, Fukuda returned to Beijing and on 28 July informed Xi about the consent from Abe, and thus laid the groundwork for the Japan-PRC summit that was held in November 2014. In 2018, Fukuda met with PRC Foreign Minister Wang Yi, during the 4th round of dialogue between entrepreneurs and former senior officials of the PRC and Japan.

In July 2019, Fukuda addressed the two-day Sino-U.S. trade relations forum in Hong Kong, attended by high-level attendees included former PRC vice-premier Zeng Peiyan and other previous government heads and officials, as well as entrepreneurs and scholars from around the world. Fukuda urged the PRC to seriously consider what role it wanted to play on the world stage, describing it as "the most serious issue of the era that we are faced with... Each step China takes not only affects relations between the United States and China, but also the entire world," he said.

==== After politics ====
After retiring in 2012, he was the President of the Japan-Indonesia Association.

Fukuda died from heart failure at a hospital in Tokyo, on 22 October 2026, at the age of 90.

== Controversies ==
=== Statements on "Super Free" ===
When Fukuda was Chief Cabinet Secretary to former Prime Minister Junichiro Koizumi he was reported to have made highly controversial comments during an off-the-record discussion with reporters in June 2003 regarding the victims of rape by male members of the Waseda University "Super Free" club, according to an article in the weekly magazine Shukan Bunshun.

The magazine quoted Fukuda as saying: "There are women who look like they are saying 'Do it to me'. Those who have that kind of appearance are at fault, because men are black panthers." In response, Fukuda claimed that the Shukan Bunshun had distorted his comments, stating that he had never intended to defend rape, and told a parliamentary panel afterward that rape was "a criminal act and an atrocious crime."

== Cabinet ==
Fukuda's cabinet was formed on 26 September 2007. It was almost identical to Abe's. After his administration started, the Cabinet's approval rating continually declined. According to the Asahi Shimbun newspaper, in late April 2008 the disapproval rating of the Cabinet was 60 percent and the approval rating at 25 percent. Fukuda reshuffled his cabinet on 1 August 2008.

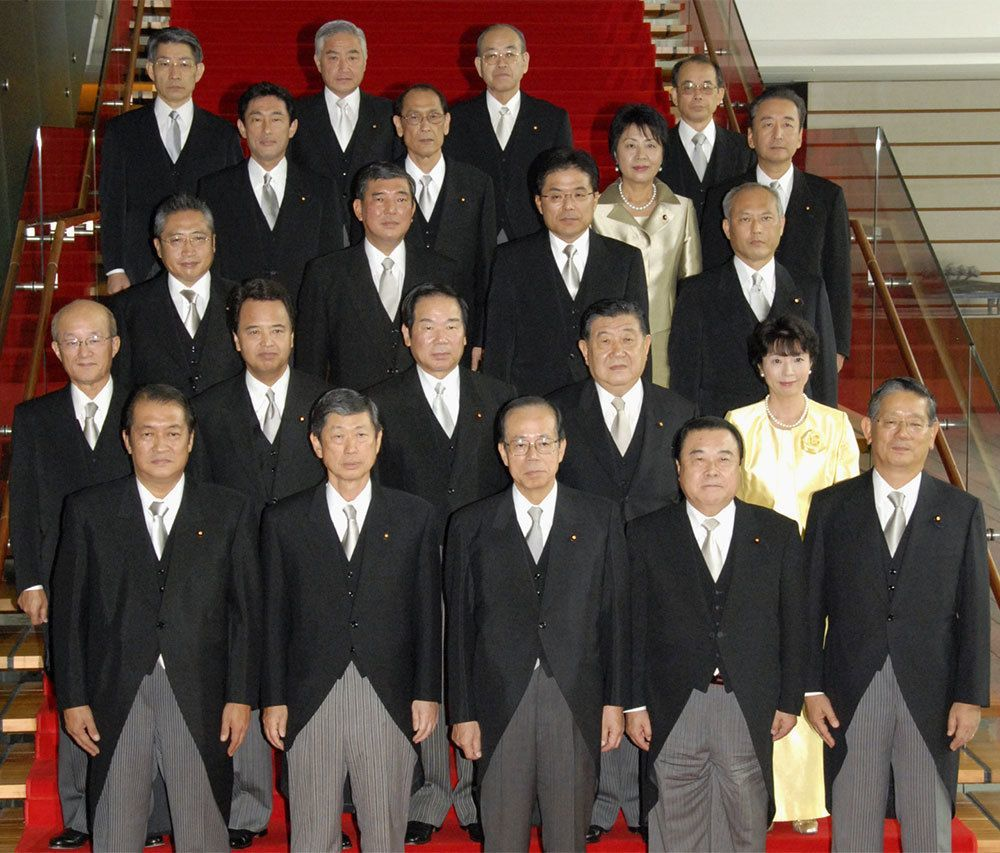
Fukuda with the Ministers of Fukuda Government (at the Prime Minister's Official Residence on 26 September 2007)

Secretary	Nobutaka Machimura
Internal Affairs	Hiroya Masuda
Justice	Kunio Hatoyama
Foreign Affairs	Masahiko Kōmura
Finance	Fukushiro Nukaga
Education	Kisaburo Tokai
Health	Yōichi Masuzoe
Agriculture	Masatoshi Wakabayashi
Economy	Akira Amari
Land	Tetsuzo Fuyushiba
Environment	Ichirō Kamoshita
Defense	Shigeru Ishiba
Public Safety, Disaster Prevention	Shinya Izumi
Economic Policy	Hiroko Ōta
Financial Services, Administrative Reform	Yoshimi Watanabe
Okinawa and Northern Territories, Technology Policy, Regulatory Reform	Fumio Kishida
Population, Youth and Gender Equality	Yōko Kamikawa

== Decorations ==
In March 2008, Croatian president Stjepan Mesić presented Fukuda with the Grand Order of Queen Jelena with the Sash and the Croatian Morning Star. The decoration was given to Fukuda for his efforts in promoting friendly relations between Japan and Croatia.

== Election history ==
Election	Age	District	Political party	Number of votes	election results
1990 Japanese general election	53	Gunma 3rd district	LDP	88,445	winning
1993 Japanese general election	57	Gunma 3rd district	LDP	83,501	winning
1996 Japanese general election	60	Gunma 4th district	LDP	73,674	winning
2000 Japanese general election	63	Gunma 4th district	LDP	94,517	winning
2003 Japanese general election	67	Gunma 4th district	LDP	98,903	winning
2005 Japanese general election	69	Gunma 4th district	LDP	118,517	winning
2009 Japanese general election	73	Gunma 4th district	LDP	103,852	winning

== See also ==
- Tokyo International Conference on African Development (TICAD-IV), 2008.

House of Representatives (Japan)
New constituency	Representative for Gunma's 4th district 1996–2012	Succeeded by Tatsuo Fukuda
Political offices
Preceded by Hidenao Nakagawa	Minister for Okinawa Development; 2000	Succeeded by Ryutaro Hashimoto
Preceded by Hidenao Nakagawa	Chief Cabinet Secretary; 2000–2004	Succeeded by Hiroyuki Hosoda
New office	Minister of State for Gender Equality and Social Affairs; 2001–2004	Succeeded by Kuniko Inoguchi
Preceded by Shinzō Abe	Prime Minister of Japan; 2007–2008	Succeeded by Tarō Asō
Party political offices
Preceded by Shinzō Abe	President of the Liberal Democratic Party; 2007–2008	Succeeded by Tarō Asō
Diplomatic posts
Preceded by Angela Merkel	Chairperson of the G8; 2008	Succeeded by Silvio Berlusconi
