= Zenkō Suzuki cabinet =

Cabinet of Japan (1980–1982)

Zenkō Suzuki Cabinet
- 70th Cabinet of Japan

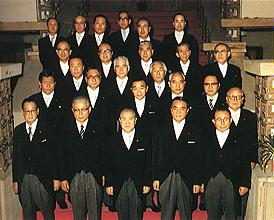
- Date formed: July 17, 1980
- Date dissolved: November 30, 1981

People and organisations
- Emperor: Shōwa
- Prime Minister: Zenkō Suzuki
- Member party: Liberal Democratic Party
- Status in legislature: Majority government (Lower House)
- Opposition parties: Japan Socialist Party; Kōmeitō; Democratic Socialist Party; Japanese Communist Party

History
- Predecessor: Second Ōhira Cabinet
- Successor: Zenkō Suzuki Cabinet (Reshuffle)

The Zenkō Suzuki Cabinet is the 70th Cabinet of Japan headed by Zenkō Suzuki from July 17, 1980, to November 27, 1982.

== Cabinet ==
Portfolio	Minister	Note	
Prime Minister	Zenkō Suzuki		
Minister of Justice	Seisuke Okuno		
Minister for Foreign Affairs	Masayoshi Ito		Resigned on May 18, 1981
Minister for Foreign Affairs	Sunao Sonoda		Appointed on May 18, 1981
Minister of Finance	Michio Watanabe		
Minister of Education	Tanaka Tatsuo		
Minister of Health	Kunikichi Saitō		Resigned on September 19, 1980
Minister of Health	Sunao Sonoda		Appointed on September 19, 1980; Resigned on May 18, 1981
Minister of Health	Tatsuo Murayama		Appointed on May 18, 1981
Minister of Agriculture, Forestry and Fisheries	Takao Kameoka		
Minister of International Trade and Industry	Rokusuke Tanaka		
Minister of Transport	Masajuro Shiokawa		
Minister of Posts	Ichirō Yamanouchi		
Minister of Labor	Masayuki Fujio		
Minister of Construction	Shigeyoshi Saitō		
Minister of Home Affairs; Chair of the National Public Safety Commission	Jirō Ishiba		Resigned on December 17, 1980
Minister of Home Affairs; Chair of the National Public Safety Commission	Tōkichi Abiko		Appointed on December 17, 1980
Chief Cabinet Secretary	Kiichi Miyazawa		
Director-General of the Prime Minister's Office; Director of the Okinawa Development Agency Development	Taro Nakayama		
Director of the Administrative Management Agency	Yasuhiro Nakasone		
Director of the Hokkaido Regional Development Agency; Director of the National Land Agency	Kenzaburo Hara		
Director of the Defense Agency	Jōji Ōmura		
Director of the Economic Planning Agency	Toshio Kōmoto		
Director of the Science and Technology Agency; Chair of the Atomic Energy Commission	Ichiro Nakagawa		
Director of the Environment Agency	Hyōsuke Kujiraoka		
Deputy Chief Cabinet Secretary	Riki Kawara		for Political Affairs
Deputy Chief Cabinet Secretary	Kyūjirō Okina	Bureaucrat	for General Affairs
Director-General of the Cabinet Legislation Bureau	Reijirō Tsunoda	Bureaucrat	
Deputy Chief Cabinet Secretary for the Prime Minister's Office	Shinji Sato		for Political Affairs
Deputy Chief Cabinet Secretary for the Prime Minister's Office	Hiroo Kanno	Bureaucrat	for General Affairs; Resigned on January 23, 1981
Deputy Chief Cabinet Secretary for the Prime Minister's Office	Hiroaki Kawamura	Bureaucrat	for General Affairs; Appointed on January 23, 1981

== Reshuffled Cabinet ==
Zenkō Suzuki Cabinet (Reshuffle)
- 70th Cabinet of Japan

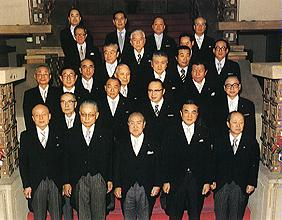
- Date formed: November 30, 1981
- Date dissolved: November 27, 1982

People and organisations
- Emperor: Shōwa
- Prime Minister: Zenkō Suzuki
- Member party: Liberal Democratic Party
- Status in legislature: Majority government (Lower House)
- Opposition parties: Japan Socialist Party; Kōmeitō; Democratic Socialist Party; Japanese Communist Party

History
- Predecessor: Zenkō Suzuki Cabinet
- Successor: First Nakasone Cabinet

A Cabinet reshuffle took place on November 30, 1981.

Portfolio	Minister	Note	
Prime Minister	Zenkō Suzuki		
Minister of Justice	Michita Sakata		
Minister for Foreign Affairs	Yoshio Sakurauchi		
Minister of Finance	Michio Watanabe		
Minister of Education	Heiji Ogawa		
Minister of Health	Motoharu Morishita		
Minister of Agriculture, Forestry and Fisheries	Kichirō Tazawa		
Minister of International Trade and Industry	Shintaro Abe		
Minister of Transport	Tokusaburō Kosaka		
Minister of Posts	Noboru Minowa		
Minister of Labor	Takiichirō Hatsumura		
Minister of Construction	Ihei Shiseki		
Minister of Home Affairs; Chair of the National Public Safety Commission	Masataka Sekō		
Chief Cabinet Secretary	Kiichi Miyazawa		
Director-General of the Prime Minister's Office; Director of the Okinawa Development Agency Development	Taro Nakayama		
Director of the Administrative Management Agency	Yasuhiro Nakasone		
Director of the Hokkaido Regional Development Agency; Director of the National Land Agency	Kenzaburo Hara		
Director of the Defense Agency	Soichiro Ito		
Director of the Economic Planning Agency	Toshio Kōmoto		
Director of the Science and Technology Agency; Chair of the Atomic Energy Commission	Ichiro Nakagawa		
Director of the Environment Agency	Bunbee Hara		
Deputy Chief Cabinet Secretary	Yukihiko Ikeda		for Political Affairs
Deputy Chief Cabinet Secretary	Kyūjirō Okina	Bureaucrat	for General Affairs
Director-General of the Cabinet Legislation Bureau	Reijirō Tsunoda	Bureaucrat	
Deputy Chief Cabinet Secretary for the Prime Minister's Office	Jōji Fukushima		for Political Affairs
Deputy Chief Cabinet Secretary for the Prime Minister's Office	Hiroaki Kawamura	Bureaucrat	for General Affairs; Resigned on August 27, 1982
Deputy Chief Cabinet Secretary for the Prime Minister's Office	Susumu Yamaji	Bureaucrat	for General Affairs; Appointed on August 27, 1982
