= Kiyoko Fukuda (socialite) =

Spouse of the Japanese Prime Minister from 2007 to 2008

- 福田 貴代子
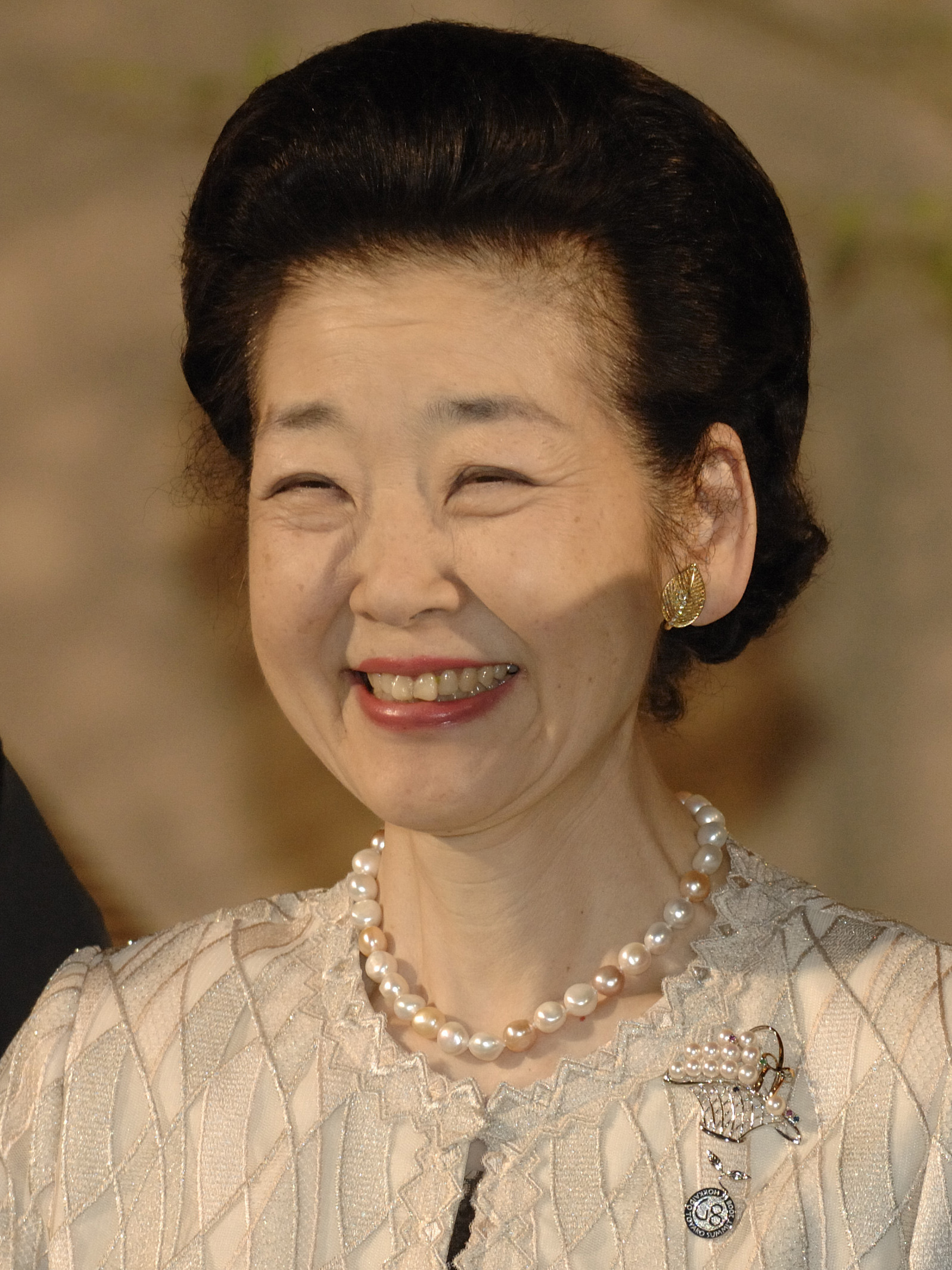
- Kiyoko in 2008

Spouse of the Prime Minister of Japan
- In role 26 September 2007 – 24 September 2008
- Monarch: Akihito
- Prime Minister: Yasuo Fukuda
- Preceded by: Akie Abe
- Succeeded by: Chikako Asō

Personal details
- Born: 13 January 1944 (age 82) Tokyo, Japan
- Spouse: Yasuo Fukuda (m. 1966; died 2026)
- Children: Tatsuo
- Relatives: Seiichi Ōta
- Education: Keio University

Kiyoko Fukuda (Note: Japanese: 福田 貴代子 Fukuda Kiyoko) (née Mine; born 13 January 1944) is a Japanese figure and the widow of Yasuo Fukuda, former Prime Minister of Japan. She became known for her signature orizuru origami, and campaigned in place of her husband in most elections he ran in.

== Biography ==
She was born into a prominent family as the niece of Yoshio Sakurauchi and sister-in-law of Akira Saito. She majored in psychology at Keio University's Faculty of Letters. After this, she met Fukuda's father Takeo, and sought to get his help in getting a job at Japan Airlines. However, his wife told her to not go to Japan Airlines and instead come live with them. She became closer to the family, and eventually married Yasuo Fukuda.

She was the one to convince her husband to run for office in the House of Representatives of Japan. Despite her stated determination to not become a politician, she led almost every single one of the campaigns of her husband in her husband's place.

Fukuda's cousin Seiichi Ōta was Minister of Agriculture, Forestry and Fisheries in her husband's cabinet.

As wife of the prime minister, she became known for her signature orizuru, which she learned how to fold from an acquaintance. She gave them out to first ladies she met, which came to be known as "origami crane diplomacy". During the Great East Japan Earthquake, she folded cranes and delivered them to temporary housing where victims of the earthquake were staying: these cranes became known as "cranes of hope". She has also held workshops on how to fold paper cranes.

== Gallery ==
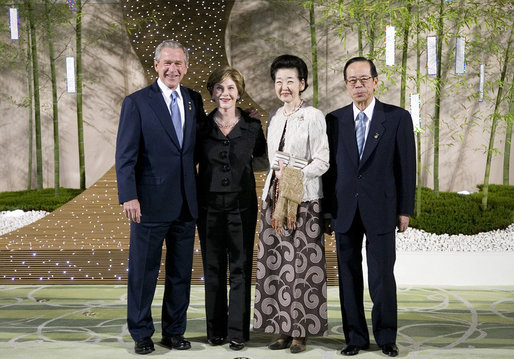
Kiyoko and Yasuo Fukuda with President of the United States George W. Bush and First Lady of the United States Laura Bush at the Windsor Hotel Toya Resort and Spa in Tōyako Town, Abuta District, Hokkaido on July 7, 2008.

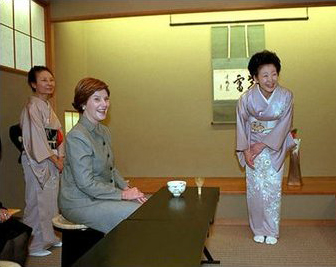
Kiyoko Fukuda and Laura Bush following a lunch and tea ceremony at Akasaka Palace, Minato, Tokyo on 18 February 2002.

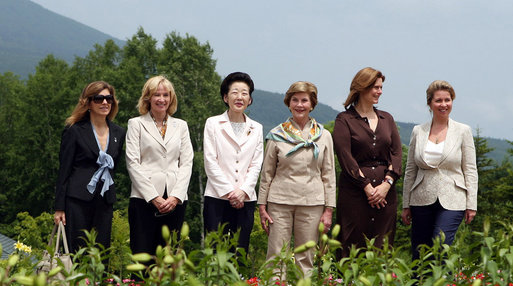
Kiyoko Fukuda with the spouses of other national leaders during the 34th G8 summit which was held in Makkari Village, Abuta District, Hokkaido, Japan,
on 8 July 2008

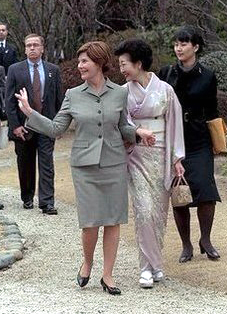
Kiyoko Fukuda and Laura Bush on 18 February 2002.

== Footnotes ==
Unofficial roles
Preceded by Akie Abe	Spouse of the Prime Minister of Japan; 2007–2008	Succeeded by Chikako Asō
