= Tarō Asō =

Prime Minister of Japan from 2008 to 2009

- 麻生 太郎
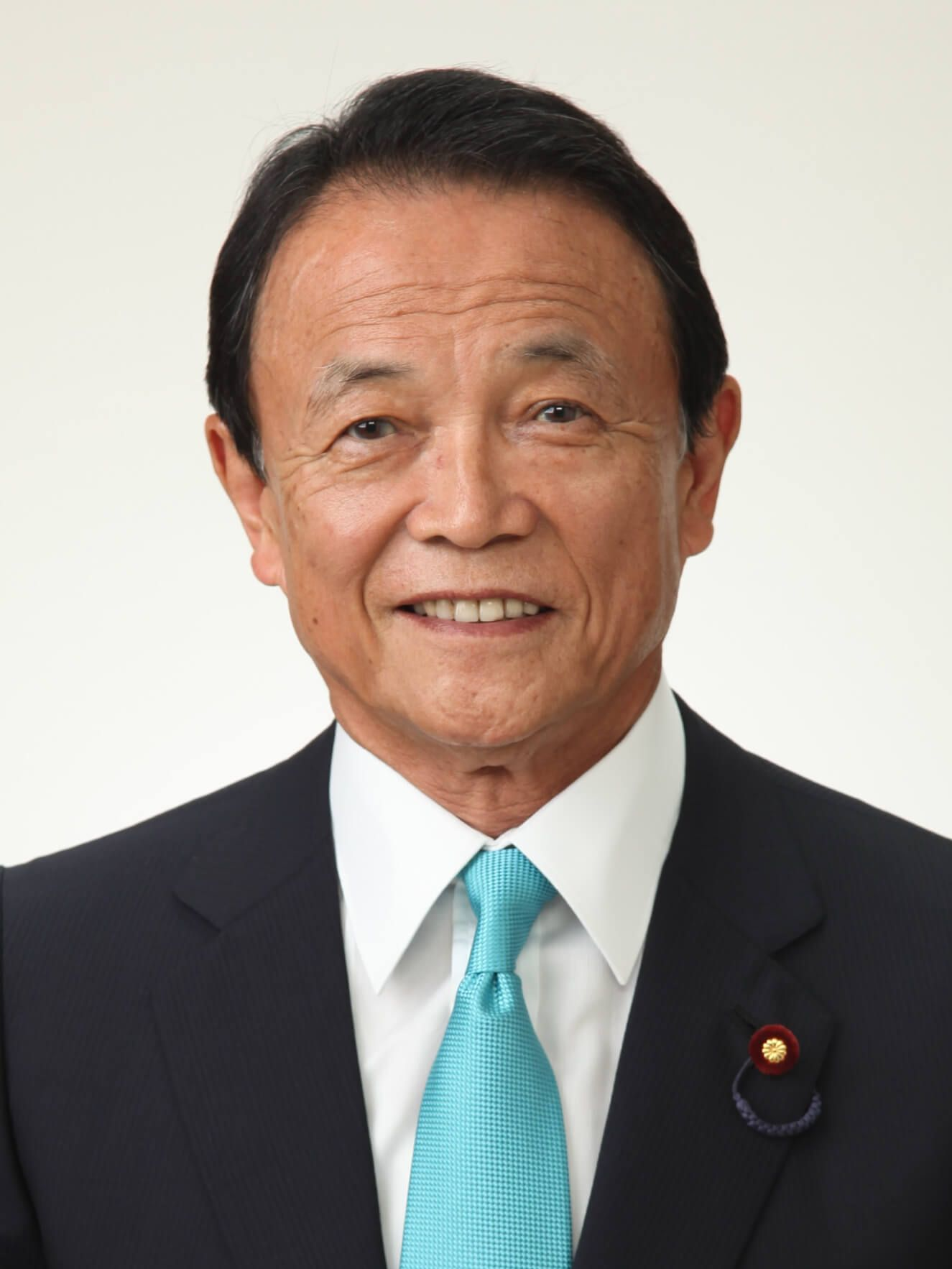
- Official portrait, 2017

Prime Minister of Japan
- In office 24 September 2008 – 16 September 2009
- Monarch: Akihito
- Preceded by: Yasuo Fukuda
- Succeeded by: Yukio Hatoyama

President of the Liberal Democratic Party
- In office 22 September 2008 – 28 September 2009
- Secretary-General: Hiroyuki Hosoda
- Preceded by: Yasuo Fukuda
- Succeeded by: Sadakazu Tanigaki

Vice President of the Liberal Democratic Party
- Incumbent
- Assumed office 7 October 2025
- President: Sanae Takaichi
- Secretary-General: Shun'ichi Suzuki
- Preceded by: Yoshihide Suga
- In office 8 October 2021 – 27 September 2024
- President: Fumio Kishida
- Secretary-General: Akira Amari; Toshimitsu Motegi
- Preceded by: Masahiko Kōmura
- Succeeded by: Yoshihide Suga

Deputy Prime Minister of Japan
- In office 26 December 2012 – 4 October 2021
- Prime Minister: Shinzo Abe; Yoshihide Suga
- Preceded by: Katsuya Okada
- Succeeded by: Vacant
Ministerial offices
Minister of Finance
In office 26 December 2012 – 4 October 2021
Prime Minister	Shinzo Abe; Yoshihide Suga
Preceded by	Koriki Jojima
Succeeded by	Shun'ichi Suzuki
Minister for Foreign Affairs
In office 31 October 2005 – 27 August 2007
Prime Minister	Junichiro Koizumi; Shinzo Abe
Preceded by	Nobutaka Machimura
Succeeded by	Nobutaka Machimura
Minister for Internal Affairs and Communications
In office 22 September 2003 – 31 October 2005
Prime Minister	Junichiro Koizumi
Preceded by	Toranosuke Katayama
Succeeded by	Heizō Takenaka

Member of the House of Representatives; from Fukuoka
- Incumbent
- Assumed office 8 July 1986
- Preceded by: Kazuaki Ozawa
- Constituency: 2nd district (1986–1996); 8th district (1996–present)
- In office 7 October 1979 – 28 November 1983
- Preceded by: Shichirō Matsumoto
- Succeeded by: Shinnen Tagaya
- Constituency: 2nd district

Personal details
- Born: 20 September 1940 (age 86) Iizuka, Fukuoka, Japan
- Party: Liberal Democratic (Shikōkai)
- Spouse: Chikako Suzuki (m. 1983)
- Children: 2
- Relatives: See list: Shigeru Yoshida (grandfather) Nobuko, Princess Tomohito of Mikasa (sister) Princess Akiko (niece) Princess Yōko (niece) Ken'ichi Yoshida (uncle) Zenkō Suzuki (father-in-law) Shun'ichi Suzuki (brother-in-law)
- Education: Gakushuin University; Stanford University; London School of Economics
- Website: Official website

Tarō Asō (麻生 太郎, Asō Tarō; born 20 September 1940) is a Japanese politician who served as Prime Minister of Japan from 2008 to 2009. A member of the Liberal Democratic Party (LDP), he also served as Deputy Prime Minister and Minister of Finance from 2012 to 2021. He was the longest-serving Deputy Prime Minister and Minister of Finance in Japanese history, having previously served as Minister for Foreign Affairs from 2005 to 2007 and as Minister for Internal Affairs and Communications from 2003 to 2005. He leads the Shikōkai faction within the LDP.

Asō was first elected to the House of Representatives in 1979. He served in numerous ministerial roles before becoming Secretary-General of the Liberal Democratic Party (LDP) in 2008, having also held that role temporarily in 2007. He was later elected LDP President in September 2008, becoming prime minister the same month. He led the LDP to the worst election result in its history a year later, marking only the second time in post-war Japan that a governing party had lost re-election, and resigned as the President of the party immediately afterwards.

After the LDP returned to government following the 2012 election under Shinzo Abe, Asō was appointed to the Cabinet as Deputy Prime Minister and Finance Minister, retaining those roles when Yoshihide Suga replaced Abe in 2020. After leaving cabinet, he's served as vice president of the LDP under Fumio Kishida and as senior advisor to the LDP under Shigeru Ishiba. He is a noted power broker inside the party, leading the Shikōkai.

Asō has been attached to a number of controversies in his career. He conceded in 2008 that his family had benefitted from forced labor during World War II, although he has refused to apologize for it. Asō also had a reputation for political gaffes and controversial remarks.

== Family and early life ==
Taro Asō was born in Iizuka in Fukuoka Prefecture on 20 September 1940, as the eldest son of Takakichi Asō and his wife Kazuko. The Asō family was one of the leading business families in Kyushu, going back to Asō's great grandfather Takichi Asō, who established himself as a coal mining magnate in the Meiji era. Takakichi Asō took over the family company after Takichi as a young man in the 1930s.

Kazuko was the daughter of the diplomat Shigeru Yoshida, who served as prime minister from 1946 to 1947, and 1948 to 1954. He is also by marriage related to Sato Eisaku, who served as prime minister from 1964 to 1974. Through his maternal grandmother, Aso is also a descendant of the Meiji statesman Toshimichi Okubo, considered one of the founders of modern Japan.

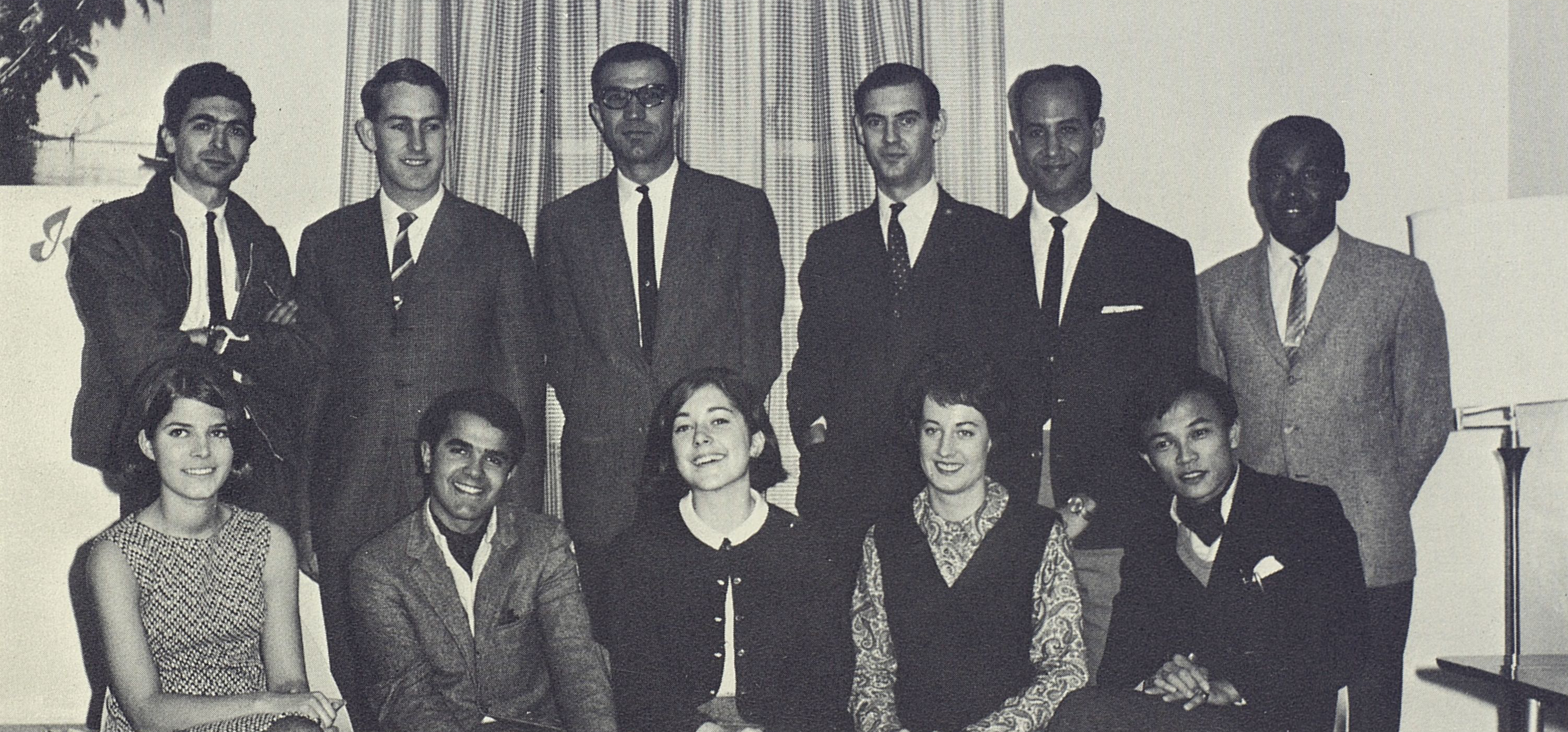
Asō (seated, far right) with other members of the International Club at Stanford University, 1965

Asō initially attended an elementary school affiliated with the Aso Group, but in his third year of elementary school he transferred to Gakushuin in Tokyo, the traditional school for children of the aristocracy. He graduated from Gakushuin University in 1963. He took the employment examination for the Sankei Shimbun, but decided to continue his studied overseas instead. Asō attended Stanford University in California, but later dropped out. By his own account, his anglophile grandfather Shigeru Yoshida, who had come to see him in connection to attending the funeral of General Douglas MacArthur, was displeased with him acquiring a "lousy Californian accent," leading to him being ordered by his family to study in Britain instead. He consequently transferred to the London School of Economics.

== Business career ==
In 1966, after he returned to Japan from his studies abroad, he entered the Aso Industry Company. Working for the company, he lived in Brazil during the 1960s and became fluent in Portuguese.

For two years from 1970, Asō worked in the diamond mining industry in Sierra Leone as a local representative of the Asō family, at a new mining area offered by a local authority after the nationalization of the diamond industry in the country. He was forced to return to Japan at the outbreak of civil unrest in Sierra Leone.

Asō served as president of the Aso Mining Company from 1973 to 1979. He was also a member of the Japanese shooting team at the 1976 Summer Olympics in Montreal and President of the Japan Junior Chamber in 1978.

== Political career ==
=== Early political career ===
Asō was first elected to the House of Representative in the 1979 election, as a LDP candidate in Fukuoka 3rd district. He handed over leadership of the family business to his brother Yutaka upon taking office. Asō joined the Kochikai, a political faction deriving from the legacy of his grandfather Shigeru Yoshida.

When he was a junior Diet member, Asō met Chikako, the daughter of Prime Minister Zenkō Suzuki, at a dinner party hosted by Suzuki. Asō and Chikako Suzuki were married in November 3, 1983.

=== Cabinet Minister ===
Asō received his first cabinet position as Minister of State and Director General of the Economic Planning Agency under Prime Minister Ryutaro Hashimoto in November 1996 and served until September 1997.

Although Asō was a member of the Kochikai, he was on bad terms with Koichi Kato, who was considered the "prince of the Kochikai" at the time. He participated in a factional defection led by Yohei Kono after Kato succeeded Kiichi Miyazawa as head of the Kochikai in 1998.

He joined the Cabinet of Junichiro Koizumi in 2003 as Minister of Internal Affairs and Communications. On 31 October 2005, he became Minister for Foreign Affairs. There has been some speculation that his position in the Cabinet was due to his membership in the Kōno Group, an LDP caucus led by pro-Chinese lawmaker Yōhei Kōno: by appointing Asō as Minister for Foreign Affairs, Koizumi may have been attempting to "rein in" Kōno's statements critical of Japanese foreign policy.

=== Candidate for the LDP Leadership ===
Asō was one of the final candidates to replace Koizumi as prime minister in 2006, but lost the internal party election to Shinzo Abe by a wide margin. Both Abe and Asō are conservative on foreign policy issues and have taken confrontational stances towards some East Asian nations, particularly North Korea and, to a lesser extent, the People's Republic of China. Abe was considered a more "moderate" politician than the more "hard-line" Asō, and led Asō in opinion polling within Japan. Asō's views on multilateralism are suggested in a 2006 speech, "Arc of Freedom and Prosperity: Japan's Expanding Diplomatic Horizons".

Asō acknowledged that he would most likely lose to Fukuda, but said that he wanted to run so that there would be an open election, saying that otherwise LDP would face criticism for making its choice "through back-room deals". In the President election, held on 23 September, Fukuda defeated Asō, receiving 330 votes against 197 votes for Asō.

On 1 August 2008, Fukuda appointed Asō as Secretary-General of LDP, a move that solidified Asō's position as the number two-man in the party.

=== Prime Minister of Japan ===
Unexpectedly on 1 September 2008, Fukuda announced his resignation as prime minister. Five LDP members including Asō ran for new party President to succeed Fukuda. On 21 September, one day before votes of Diet party members, Asō reportedly told a crowd of supporters outside Tokyo: "The greatest concern right now is the economy." "America is facing a financial crisis ... we must not allow that to bring us down as well." Finally on 22 September, Asō did win. He was elected as President of LDP with 351 of 525 votes (217 from 384 Diet party members, 134 from 47 prefecture branches); Kaoru Yosano, Yuriko Koike, Nobuteru Ishihara, Shigeru Ishiba got 66, 46, 37, 25 votes respectively.

Two days later on 24 September, Asō was designated by the Diet as prime minister, and was formally appointed to the office by the Emperor on that night. In the House of Representatives (lower house), he garnered 337 out of 478 votes cast; in the House of Councillors (upper house), Ichirō Ozawa, President of the main opposition Democratic Party of Japan, was named through two times of ballots. Because no agreement was reached at a joint committee of both Houses, the resolution of the House of Representatives became the resolution of the Diet, as is stipulated in the Constitution. Asō reportedly said, "If you look at the current period, it's not a stable one." and "These are turbulent times with the financial situation and everything else."

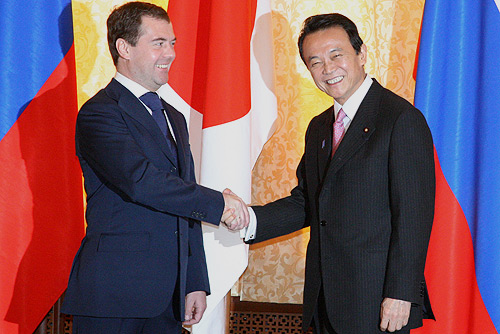
Tarō Asō meeting Russian President Dmitry Medvedev in Yuzhno-Sakhalinsk on 18 February 2009.

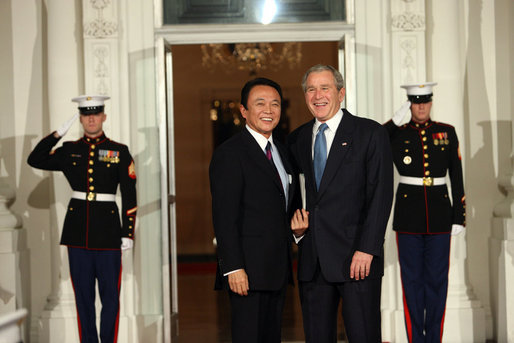
Tarō Asō meeting with U.S. President George W. Bush in the White House on 14 November 2008.

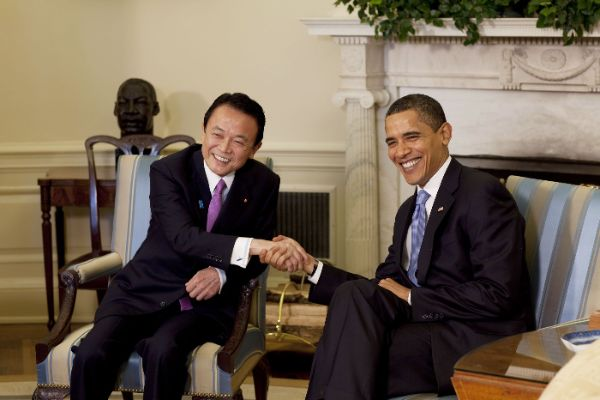
Tarō Asō meeting with U.S. President Barack Obama in the White House on 24 February 2009.

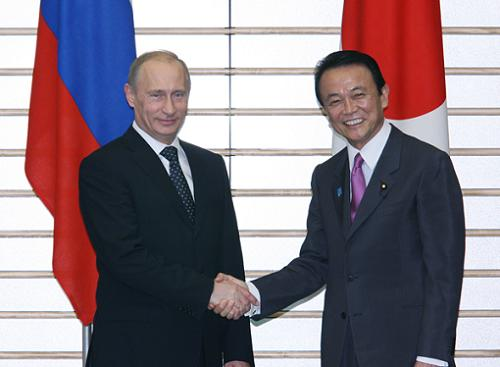
Tarō Asō meeting with Russian Prime Minister Vladimir Putin in Tokyo on 12 May 2009.

Later on the same day as his election as prime minister, Asō personally announced his new Cabinet (this is normally done by the Chief Cabinet Secretary). His Cabinet was markedly different from the preceding Cabinet under Fukuda. Five of its members had never previously served in the Cabinet, and one of them, 34-year-old Yūko Obuchi, was the youngest member of the Cabinet in the post-war era.

Prime Minister Asō flew to Washington to meet with United States President Barack Obama in February 2009. He was the first foreign leader to visit the Obama White House; however, reports suggested that the new administration was interested less in giving Asō a political boost than in sending a message that Japan continues to be an important ally and partner – a low-risk, high-payoff gesture for both Asō and Obama.

After his election as prime minister Asō was expected to dissolve the lower house to clear the way for a general election. But he repeatedly stressed the need for a functioning government to face the economic crisis and ruled out an early election. Only after passage of the extra budget for fiscal 2009 in May and facing internal pressure from the LDP after a series of defeats in regional elections – most notably the Tokyo prefectural election on 12 July – he decided to announce a general election for 30 August 2009. He dissolved the House of Representatives on 21 July 2009. The LDP lost by a landslide to the Democratic Party of Japan, in the face of record levels of post-war unemployment. Accepting responsibility for the worst (and second-only) defeat of a sitting government in modern Japanese history, Asō immediately resigned as LDP president.

=== Post-premiership and party kingmaker ===
Deputy Prime Minister Asō in front of the Gundam Cafe in Akihabara introducing prime minister Shinzo Abe (middle) with a speech, 2014.

When Shinzo Abe returned to the prime minister's office in December 2012, Aso is appointed deputy prime minister and minister of finance. He is the first former Japanese prime minister to subsequently serve as deputy prime minister. Following Shinzo Abe's second resignation as prime minister in August 2020 due to a resurgence of ulcerative colitis, many speculated Aso would launch a leadership bid. He took many people aback when he announced that he would not seek the post. Aso maintained his position as deputy prime minister under Abe's successor Yoshihide Suga, until Suga himself resigned in September 2021 and was succeeded by Fumio Kishida. Aso became the vice president of the Liberal Democratic Party under the new LDP leader and Prime Minister Fumio Kishida.

After Fumio Kishida was appointed prime minister in October 2021, Asō was moved to the role of vice president of the Liberal Democratic Party. Asō backed Taro Kono in the first round of the 2024 LDP presidential election, and then backed Sanae Takaichi, who ultimately lost to Shigeru Ishiba. He was considered to be visibly unhappy as Ishiba was announced the winner. He was replaced as Vice President by Yoshihide Suga, instead becoming Senior Advisor to the party.

Following the Liberal Democratic Party's significant loss of seats in the 2025 Japanese House of Councillors election, Aso stated, "I will not approve of Ishiba continuing." In the subsequent 2025 LDP presidential election held after Ishiba's resignation, Aso avoided publicly declaring his support for any candidate. However, on the day before the run-off vote, he issued the following instruction to members of his faction: "In the run-off, vote for the candidate who received more votes from rank-and-file party members." Based on internal polling that showed Takaichi leading among party members, this was effectively a declaration of support for Takaichi.

Since the camp of the third-place finisher, Hayashi, was certain to vote for Koizumi in a Koizumi vs. Takaichi run-off, Aso began groundwork with the fourth- and fifth-place camps. Aso requested their cooperation, proposing: "In the first round of voting, half of the Aso faction will vote for Motegi and the other half for Kobayashi. In exchange, we ask for your support for Takaichi in the run-off." After Takaichi won the election, Aso was appointed again as the LDP's vice president. Not only that, but Shun'ichi Suzuki, who is in the Aso faction (and Aso's brother-in-law), was appointed Secretary-General, and Haruko Arimura, also of the Aso faction, was appointed Chairperson of the General Council. Consequently, some media outlets described it as the "Second Aso Administration."

== Controversial statements ==
In 2001, he was quoted as saying he wanted to make Japan a country where "rich Jews" would like to live.

On 15 October 2005, during the opening ceremony of the Kyushu National Museum which also displays how other Asian cultures have influenced Japanese cultural heritage, he praised Japan for having "one culture, one civilization, one language, and one ethnic group", and stated that it was the only such country in the world. This statement sparked controversy for what critics described as invoking Japan's imperialist and racist past.

At a lecture in Nagasaki Prefecture, Asō referred to a Japanese peace initiative on the Middle East, stating, "The Japanese were trusted because they had never been involved in exploitation there, or been involved in fights or fired machine guns. Japan is doing what the Americans can't do. It would probably be no good to have blue eyes and blond hair. Luckily, we Japanese have yellow faces."

Kyodo News reported that he had said on 4 February 2006, "our predecessors did a good thing" regarding compulsory education implemented during Japan's colonization of Taiwan.

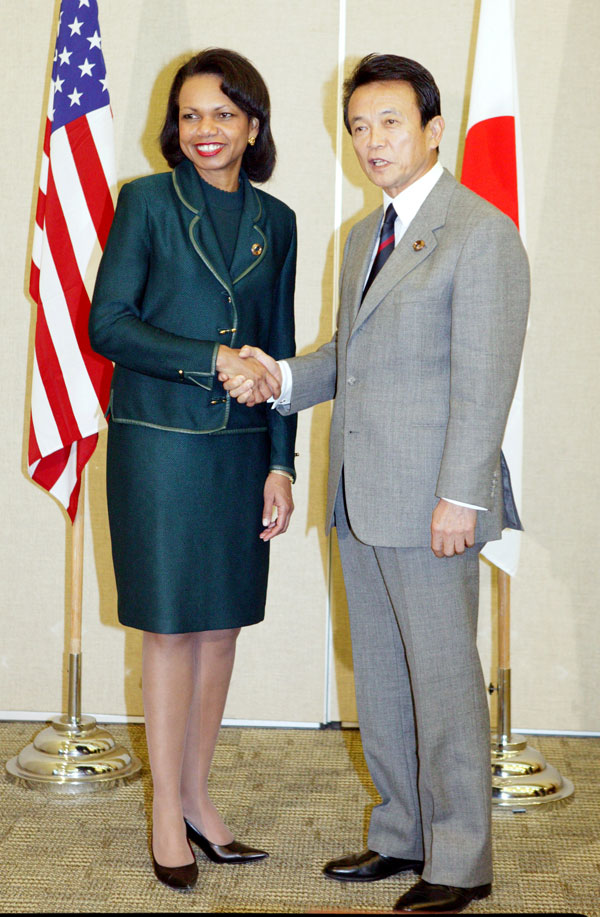
Tarō Asō shakes hands with then Secretary of State of U.S. Condoleezza Rice at APEC summit in 2005

On 21 December 2005, he said China was "a neighbour with one billion people equipped with nuclear bombs and has expanded its military outlays by double digits for 17 years in a row, and it is unclear as to what this is being used for. It is beginning to be a considerable threat". On 28 January 2006, he called for the emperor to visit the controversial Yasukuni Shrine. He later backtracked on the comment, but stated that he hoped such a visit would be possible in the future.

Mainichi Daily News reported that on 9 March 2006 he referred to Taiwan as a "law-abiding country", which drew strong protest from Beijing, which considers the island a part of China.

On 23 September 2008, Akahata, the daily newspaper published by the Japanese Communist Party, released a compiled list of these and other statements as the front-page article criticizing Asō. This compilation as well as similar lists of blunders have been frequently cited in the Japanese media.

Yahoo! News reported that he had said on 9 January 2009, "To work is good. It's completely different thinking from the Old Testament."

While speaking at a meeting of the National Council on Social Security Reform, in 2013, Asō referred to patients with serious illness as "tube persons" and remarked that they should be "allowed to die quickly" if they desired it. "Heaven forbid I should be kept alive if I want to die", he is quoted as saying. "You cannot sleep well when you think it's all paid by the government. This won't be solved unless you let them hurry up and die."

In 2014, while campaigning in Sapporo for the general election, Asō said that rising social welfare costs were not solely due to an aging population. He said, "There are many people who are creating the image that (the increasing number of) elderly people is bad, but more problematic is people who don't give birth". The comment was labeled as insensitive to those who are not able to have children for biological or economic reasons.

The Guardian reported on 30 August 2017, that he said, "Hitler, who killed millions of people, was no good even if his motive was right." He later retracted the remarks. On another occasion, he praised how the Nazi Party was able to stealthily and quickly change the constitution without alerting the general public.

According to The Japan Times, Asō "raised eyebrows" in June 2018 when he stated that the large support towards the LDP among voters under 35 in the 2017 general election was due to that demographic being less inclined than older Japanese to read newspapers, which had been critical of Abe's handling of cronyism scandals.

In May 2018, Asō downplayed alleged sexual harassment charges against his ministry's top bureaucrat by saying that "there is no such thing as a sexual harassment charge". When asked to comment on a formal complaint submitted to his ministry on the alleged sexual harassment, Asō remarked that his "only thought was that it would have been easier to read if they used a bigger font".

In October 2021, during Asō's speech for an LDP candidate in Otaru said that Hokkaido rice "has become tastier thanks to (global) warming," also adding that the rice "used to be unsalable" but now tastier and even exported "because of higher temperatures". Additionally he made the statement that people often associate global warming and the warmer temperature it brings with it as a negative but that there can be "something good" that can come out of it.

In January 2024, Aso referred to foreign minister Yoko Kamikawa as an "obasan" (roughly translated as old lady) and "not particularly beautiful" while remarking on her tenure during a speech in Fukuoka. Following widespread uproar and a rebuke by Prime Minister Fumio Kishida, Aso withdrew his remarks.

=== Aso Mining forced labor controversy ===
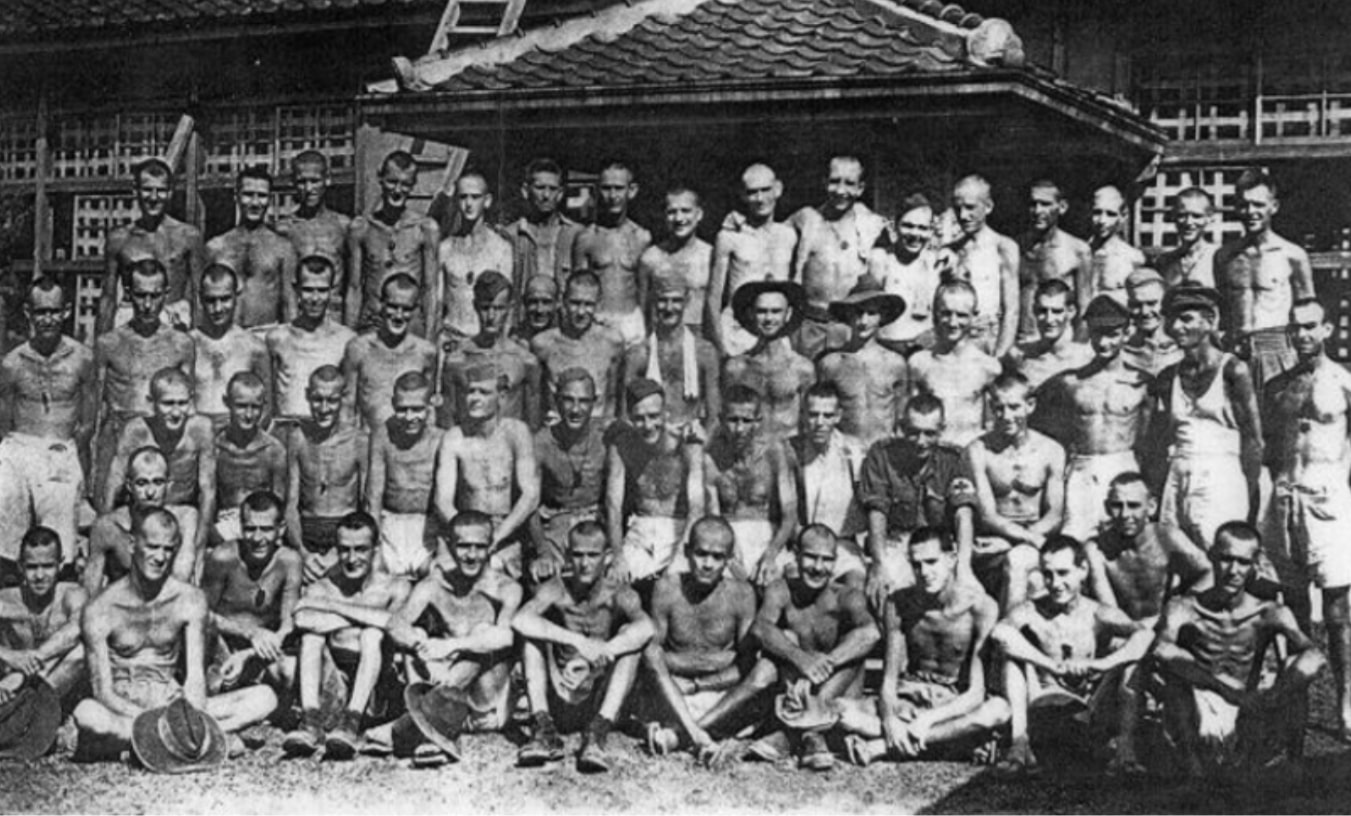
Malnourished Australian POWs forced to work at the Aso mining company, photographed in August 1945.

In mid-2008 Asō conceded that his family's coal mine, Aso Mining Company, was alleged to have forced Allied prisoners of war to work in the mines in 1945 without pay. Western media reported that 300 prisoners, including 197 Australians, 101 British, and two Dutch, worked in the mine. Two of the Australians, John Watson and Leslie Edgar George Wilkie, died while working in the Aso mine. In addition, 10,000 Korean conscripts worked in the mine between 1939 and 1945 under severe, brutal conditions in which many of them died or were injured while receiving little pay. The company, now known as the Aso Group, is run by Asō's younger brother. Asō's wife serves on its board of directors. Asō headed the company in the 1970s before going into politics.

Acting on a request from Yukihisa Fujita, the Foreign Ministry investigated and announced on 18 December 2008 that Aso Mining had, in fact, used 300 Allied POWs at its mine during World War II. The ministry confirmed that two Australians had died while working at the mine, but declined to release their names or causes of deaths for "privacy reasons". Said Fujita, "Prisoner policy is important in many ways for diplomacy, and it is a major problem that the issue has been neglected for so long." Asō has not responded to requests from former laborers to apologize for the way they were treated by his family's company.

=== Reading mistakes ===
The Japanese media noted in November 2008 that Asō often mispronounced or incorrectly read kanji words written in his speeches, even though many of the words are commonly used in Japanese. Asō spoke of the speaking errors to reporters on 12 November 2008 saying, "Those were just reading errors, just mistakes." Asō's tendency for malapropisms has led comparisons to George W. Bush (see Bushism), and the use of his name, "Tarō", as a schoolyard taunt.

An anatomy professor from the University of Tokyo, Takeshi Yoro, speculated that Asō could possibly have dyslexia.

=== Nonaka incident ===
In 2001, Asō, along with Hiromu Nonaka, was among the LDP's chief candidates to succeed Yoshirō Mori as prime minister of Japan. During a meeting of LDP leaders at which Nonaka was not present, Asō reportedly told the assembled group, "We are not going to let someone from the buraku become the prime minister, are we?" Asō's remark was apparently a reference to Nonaka's burakumin, a social minority group in Japan, heritage.

Nonaka subsequently withdrew as a candidate. Asō eventually lost the appointment to Jun'ichirō Koizumi. Asō's comment about Nonaka's heritage was revealed in 2005. Asō denied that he had made the statement, but Hisaoki Kamei, who was present at the 2001 meeting, stated in January 2009 that he had heard Asō say something, "to that effect". Nonaka said that he would "never forgive" Asō for the comment and went on to state that Asō was a "misery" to Japan.

== Personal life ==
Asō is married to Chikako Suzuki, who currently serves as the director of the Asō Group and is the daughter of former Prime Minister Zenkō Suzuki. The couple were married in 1983 and have two children, Masahiro and Ayako. Masahiro worked at Niwango, the company behind the video-sharing service website Niconico in 2005 before it was absorbed by Dwango in 2015. Masahiro is now the CEO of Aso Corporation, the holding company of Aso Group and the chairman of Junior Chamber International Japan, a youth leadership organization. Asō is also the elder brother of Nobuko, Princess Tomohito of Mikasa and is the maternal uncle of Princess Akiko of Mikasa and Princess Yōko of Mikasa. Asō is by religion Roman Catholic.

=== Fondness for fine dining ===
In October 2008, the Japanese media reported that Asō dined out or drank in restaurants and bars in luxury hotels almost nightly. When asked about it, Asō stated, "I won't change my style. Luckily I have my money and can afford it." Asō added that if he went anywhere else, he would have to be accompanied by security guards which would cause trouble.

According to the Asahi Shimbun, Asō dined out or drank at bars 32 times in September 2008, mainly at exclusive hotels. Asō's predecessor, Yasuo Fukuda, dined out only seven times in his first month in office. Both of the LDP's opposition parties have called Asō's frequent outings inappropriate. Asō's Deputy Chief Cabinet Secretary, Jun Matsumoto, commented on the issue by saying that Asō's frequent trips to restaurants "is his lifestyle and philosophy, and I am not in a position to express my opinion. If only there were more appropriate places when considering security issues and not causing trouble for other customers."

=== Net worth ===
According to The Japan Times in 2022, Tarō Asō is the wealthiest member of Japan's National Diet. While Taro Aso's exact net worth is unknown it is estimated that his net worth is 5 billion US dollars. This would make him not just one of the wealthiest politicians in Japan but one of the wealthiest politicians in the world. 80% of his estimated wealth is inherited while 20% of his estimated wealth has been earned by him.

=== Manga ===
Asō argues that embracing Japanese pop culture can be an important step to cultivating ties with other countries, hoping that manga will act as a bridge to the world.

Asō has been a fan of manga since childhood. He had his family send manga magazines from Japan while he was studying at Stanford University. In 2003, he described reading about 10 or 20 manga magazines every week (making up only part of Asō's voracious reading) and talked about his impression of various manga extemporaneously. In 2007, as Minister for Foreign Affairs, he established the International Manga Award for non-Japanese manga artists.

It was reported that he was seen reading the manga Rozen Maiden in Tokyo International Airport, which earned him the sobriquet "His Excellency Rozen". He admitted in an interview that he had read the manga; however, he said he did not remember whether he had read it in an airport. He is a fan of Golgo 13, a long-running manga about an assassin for hire.

Asō's candidacy for the position of Japanese Prime Minister actually caused share-value to rise among some manga publishers and companies related to the manga industry. Asō serves as chief advisor to the Parliamentarians' League for Japan's Anime, Manga, and Games.

=== Family tree ===
Toshimichi Ōkubo	Michitsune Mishima
Nobuaki Makino	Mineko	Takichi Asō
Yukiko	Shigeru Yoshida	Tarō Asō
Ken'ichi Yoshida	Kazuko	Takakichi Asō	Zenkō Suzuki
Prince Tomohito	Princess Nobuko	Tarō Asō	Chikako	Shun'ichi Suzuki
Princess Akiko	Princess Yōko

==== Ancestry ====
Incorporates information from the Japanese Wikipedia article

Asō is a patrilineal descendant of the Asō clan and is maternally descended from Ōkubo Toshimichi through his son Count Makino Nobuaki. Through his paternal grandmother the Hon. Kanō Natsuko, he descends from the Tachibana clan of the Miike Domain and from a cadet branch of the Ōkubo clan, who ruled the Odawara Domain.

Ancestors of Tarō Asō

16. Asō Goyō (d. 1887)
8. Asō Takichi (1857–1933)
17. Nagayomi Matsu
4. Asō Tarō (1887–1919)
9. Kikkawa Yazu (1856–1924)
2. Asō Takakichi (1911–1980)
20. Tachibana Tanemichi (1797–1855)
10. Viscount Kanō Hisayoshi, 4th Lord of Ichinomiya Domain (1848–1919)
21. NN (d. 1855)
5. Hon. Kanō Natsuko (1893–?)
22. Ōkubo Noriyoshi, 3rd Lord of Ogino-Yamanaka Domain (1825–1885)
11. Ōkubo Fumiko (1852–1893)
23. Seki Fukuko (d. 1916)
1. Asō Tarō
24. Tsuna NN
12. Tsuna Takeuchi (1840–1922)
6. Yoshida Shigeru (1878–1967)
3. Yoshida Kazuko (1915–1996)
28. Ōkubo Toshimichi (1830–1878)
14. Count Nobuaki Makino (1861–1949)
29. Hayasaki Masako (d. 1878)
7. Lady Makino Yukiko
30. Viscount Mishima Michitsune (1835–1888)
15. Hon. Mishima Mineko

== Honours ==
- Brazil :
  - Grand Cross of the Order of the Southern Cross (2 December 2020)
- Peru :
  - Grand Cross with Diamonds of the Order of the Sun of Peru (2008)

== Bibliography ==
- Takashi Hirose (広瀬隆); 『私物国家 日本の黒幕の系図』 Tokyo:Kobunsha (1997) Genealogy14
- Aso, Taro (2007). 自由と繁栄の弧. Tokyo: Gentosha. ISBN 978-4-344-41197-5.
- Aso, Taro (2007). とてつもない日本. Tokyo: Shinchosha. ISBN 978-4-10-610217-2.

== Election history ==
Election	Age	District	Political party	Number of votes	election results
1979 Japanese general election	39	Fukuoka 2nd district	LDP	71,041	winning
1980 Japanese general election	39	Fukuoka 2nd district	LDP	85,826	winning
1983 Japanese general election	43	Fukuoka 2nd district	LDP	75,412	lost
1986 Japanese general election	45	Fukuoka 2nd district	LDP	134,179	winning
1990 Japanese general election	49	Fukuoka 2nd district	LDP	99,876	winning
1993 Japanese general election	52	Fukuoka 2nd district	LDP	101,080	winning
1996 Japanese general election	56	Fukuoka 8th district	LDP	114,408	winning
2000 Japanese general election	59	Fukuoka 8th district	LDP	120,178	winning
2003 Japanese general election	63	Fukuoka 8th district	LDP	132,646	winning
2005 Japanese general election	64	Fukuoka 8th district	LDP	145,229	winning
2009 Japanese general election	68	Fukuoka 8th district	LDP	165,327	winning
2012 Japanese general election	72	Fukuoka 8th district	LDP	146,712	winning
2014 Japanese general election	74	Fukuoka 8th district	LDP	126,684	winning
2017 Japanese general election	77	Fukuoka 8th district	LDP	135,334	winning
2021 Japanese general election	81	Fukuoka 8th district	LDP	104,924	winning
2024 Japanese general election	84	Fukuoka 8th district	LDP	92,534	winning
2026 Japanese general election	85	Fukuoka 8th district	LDP	111,727	winning

Political offices
Preceded by Shusei Tanaka	Director General of the Economic Planning Agency; 1996–1997	Succeeded by Kōji Omi
Preceded by Fukushiro Nukaga	Minister of State for Economic and Fiscal Policy; 2001	Succeeded by Heizo Takenaka
Preceded by Toranosuke Katayama	Minister for Internal Affairs and Communications; 2003–2005	Succeeded by Heizo Takenaka
Preceded by Nobutaka Machimura	Minister for Foreign Affairs; 2005–2007	Succeeded by Nobutaka Machimura
Preceded by Yasuo Fukuda	Prime Minister of Japan; 2008–2009	Succeeded by Yukio Hatoyama
Preceded by Katsuya Okada	Deputy Prime Minister of Japan; 2012–2021	Vacant
Preceded by Koriki Jojima	Minister of Finance; 2012–2021	Succeeded by Shun'ichi Suzuki
Preceded by Ikko Nakatsuka	Minister of State for Financial Services; 2012–2021	Succeeded by Shun'ichi Suzuki
Party political offices
Preceded by Hidenao Nakagawa	Secretary-General of the Liberal Democratic Party; 2007	Succeeded by Bunmei Ibuki
Preceded by Bunmei Ibuki	Secretary-General of the Liberal Democratic Party; 2008	Succeeded by Hiroyuki Hosoda
Preceded by Yasuo Fukuda	President of the Liberal Democratic Party; 2008–2009	Succeeded by Sadakazu Tanigaki
Preceded by Masahiko Komura	Vice President of the Liberal Democratic Party; 2021–2024	Succeeded by Yoshihide Suga
Preceded by Yoshihide Suga	Vice President of the Liberal Democratic Party; 2025–present	Incumbent
