= Shunichi Matsumoto =

Japanese diplomat (1897–1987)

- 松本 俊一
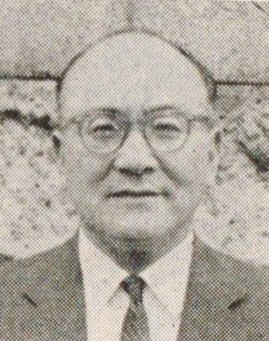
- Matsumoto in 1964

Deputy Chief Cabinet Secretary (Political affairs)
- In office 14 June 1958 – 19 July 1960
- Prime Minister: Nobusuke Kishi
- Preceded by: Tatsuo Tanaka
- Succeeded by: Heiji Ogawa

Member of the House of Representatives
- In office 28 February 1955 – 23 October 1963
- Preceded by: Kōzaburō Miyahara
- Succeeded by: Kazuo Tanikawa
- Constituency: Hiroshima 2nd

Personal details
- Born: 7 June 1897 Taipei, Taiwan, Empire of Japan
- Died: 25 January 1987 (aged 89)
- Party: Liberal Democratic
- Other political affiliations: Democratic (1955)
- Education: First Higher School
- Alma mater: Tokyo Imperial University

Shunichi Matsumoto (松本 俊一, Matsumoto Shun'ichi; 7 June 1897 – 25 January 1987) was a Japanese diplomat and politician who served as Deputy Chief Cabinet Secretary, ambassador to the United Kingdom and vice minister for foreign affairs.

== Diplomatic career ==
Matsumoto served as Vice Minister of Foreign Affairs under the cabinet of General Hideki Tōjō from 1942 to 1944, and Japanese Ambassador to French Indochina from November 1944 to March 1945, shortly before the Japanese authorities took actual control of the area. On 9 March 1945, he served French Governor-General Jean Decoux the ultimatum demanding the surrender of the French forces to the Japanese authorities. He came back to Japan as Vice Minister of Foreign Affairs at the Cabinet of Admiral Kantarō Suzuki in 1945, at the time of surrender. In this position, he advocated the acceptance of the Potsdam Declaration.

He was the first Japanese Ambassador to the United Kingdom following the reestablishing of diplomatic relations after the Second World War, serving in that position in from 1952 to 1955. From 1955 to 1963, he was a member of House of Representatives of Japan. In 1956, he took part in negotiations with the Soviet government on establishment of diplomatic relations. He served as Deputy Chief Cabinet Secretary for political affairs under Prime Minister Nobusuke Kishi from June 1958 to July 1960. In 1967, he was given the Order of the Sacred Treasure.

== Works ==
- Mosukuwa ni Kakeru Niji [Rainbow over Moscow—The Secret Record of Restoring Japan-Soviet Relations] (Asahi Shimbunsha, 1966) - diplomatic memoirs about talks with Moscow 1955-1956

Preceded by Tatsuo Tanaka	Deputy Chief Cabinet Secretary (Political affairs); 1958–1960	Succeeded by Heiji Ogawa
Preceded by Kōichirō Asakai as Chargés d'affaires ad interim	Ambassador to the United Kingdom; 1952–1955	Succeeded by Haruhiko Nishi
Preceded by Renzō Sawada	Vice Minister for Foreign Affairs; 1945	Succeeded by Tatsuo Kawai
Preceded by Kenkichi Yoshizawa	Ambassador to French Indochina; 1944–1945	Succeeded by Takeshi Tsukamoto
Preceded by Kumaichi Yamamoto	Vice Minister for Foreign Affairs; 1942–1944	Succeeded by Renzō Sawada
