= Aso Mining forced labor controversy =

Japanese used of forced labor in WWII

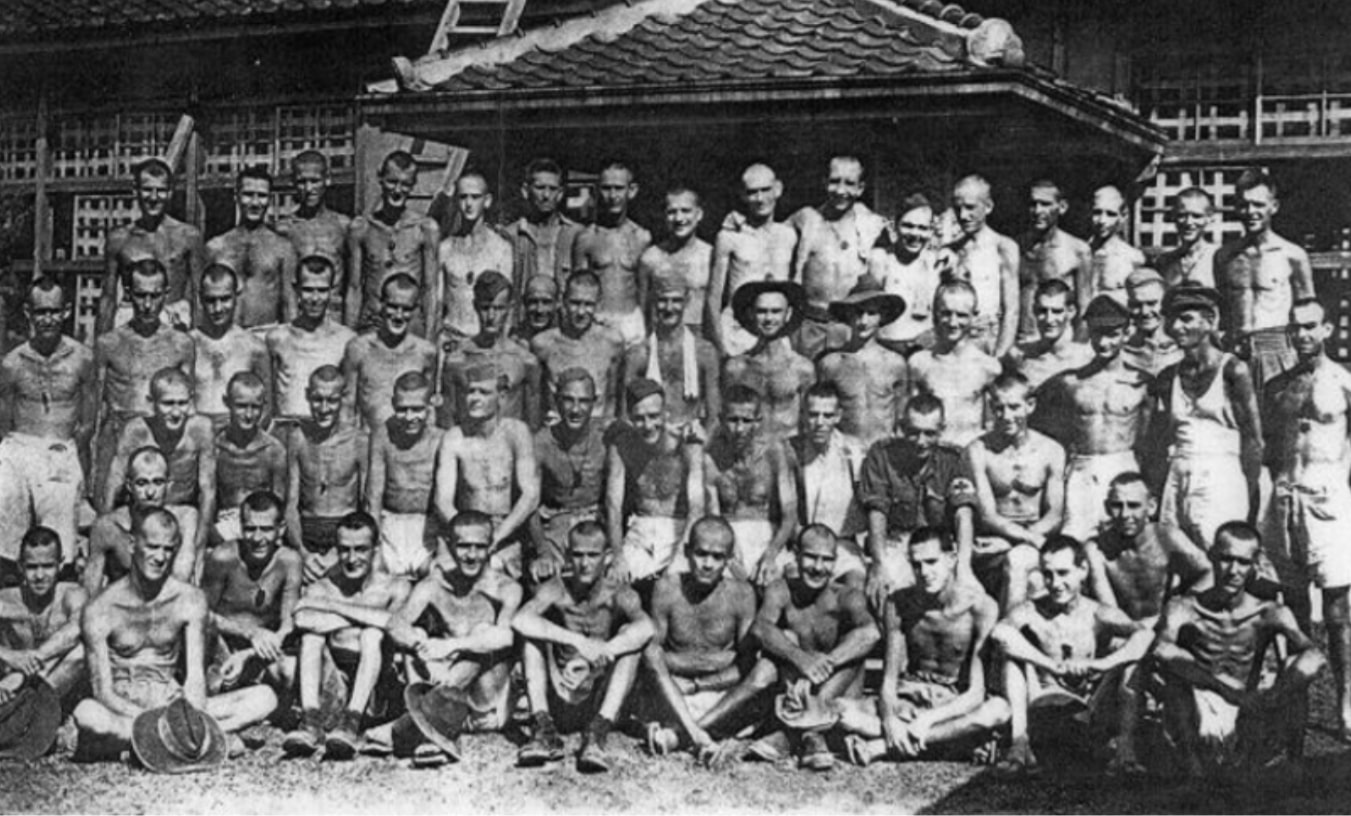
Australian POWs forced to work at the Aso mining company, photographed in August 1945.

The Aso Mining forced labour controversy concerns the use of Allied prisoners of war (POW) and Korean conscripts as labourers for the Aso Mining Company in Japan during World War II. Surviving labourers and other records confirmed that the prisoners and conscripts were forced to work in harsh, brutal conditions for little-to-no pay and that some died, at least in part, because of the ill-treatment at the mine.

Although reported by Western media sources, former Prime Minister of Japan Tarō Asō, whose immediate family owns the company, now called the Aso Group, repeatedly refused to confirm that his family's company had used forced labour until 2009 when it was acknowledged by the Japanese government. Since then, several surviving former Australian POWs have asked Aso and the company to apologise, but both have declined to do so.

== Denials ==
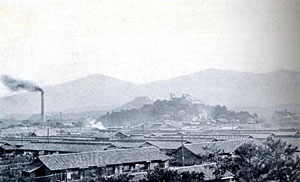
The Aso mine near Fukuoka photographed in 1933.

In mid-2008 Tarō Asō conceded that his family's coal mine, Aso Mining Company, was alleged to have forced Allied POWs to work in the mines in 1945 without pay. Western media had reported that 300 prisoners, including 197 Australians, 101 British, and two Dutch, worked in the mine. Two of the Australians, John Watson and Leslie Edgar George Wilkie, died while working in the Aso mine.

10,000 Korean conscripts worked in the mine between 1939 and 1945 under severe, brutal conditions in which many of them died or were injured while receiving little pay. Japanese American historian Mikiso Hane writes that Koreans already worked under such brutal conditions and even without compensation — i.e. as slaves — by 1932, which led to an unsuccessful strike supported by burakumin. Apart from Aso's admission, the Aso company has never acknowledged using forced labour or commented on the issue. The company, now known as the Aso Group, is currently run by Asō's younger brother. Asō's wife serves on its board of directors. Tarō Asō was president of the Aso Mining Company's successor, Aso Cement Company, in the 1970s before entering politics.

During the time that Asō served as minister of Japan's Ministry of Foreign Affairs, the ministry refused to confirm non-Japanese accounts of the use of forced labour by Japanese companies and challenged non-Japanese journalists to back up their claims with evidence. In October 2008, Diet member Shoukichi Kina asked Asō whether any data about the use of Korean labour by Aso Mining had been provided to the South Korean government, which has requested such data. Asō replied that his administration would not disclose how individual corporations have responded to Korean inquiries.

On 13 November 2008, during a discussion in the Upper House Committee on Foreign Affairs and Defense about the Tamogami essay controversy, Asō refused to confirm that forced labour had been used at his family's mine, stating that, "No facts have been confirmed." Aso added that, "I was 4, maybe 5 at the time. I was too young to recognize anything at that age." After Yukihisa Fujita responded that records at the United States National Archives and Records Administration indicated that forced labour had taken place at his family's mine, Aso repeated that "no factual details have been confirmed."

== Admission and requests for apology ==
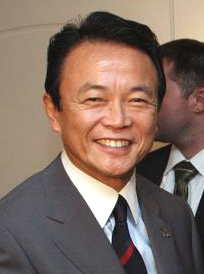
Tarō Asō

Acting on a request from Fujita, the Foreign Ministry investigated and announced on 18 December 2008 that Aso Mining had, in fact, used 300 Allied POWs at its mine during World War II. The ministry confirmed that two Australians had died while working at the mine, but declined to release their names or causes of deaths for "privacy reasons." Said Fujita, "Prisoner policy is important in many ways for diplomacy, and it is a major problem that the issue has been neglected for so long."

In February 2009, Fujita announced that he had interviewed three of the former Australian POWs forced to work at Aso Mining. All three confirmed that working conditions at the mine were terrible, that they were given little food, and were given "rags" to wear. The three veterans sent letters to Tarō Asō demanding an apology for their treatment at Aso Mining and for refusing to acknowledge that forced POW labour was used by his family's company.

The three also requested that the company pay them wages for the hours they worked. Fujita stated that Asō needed to apologise to the former labourers, as well as pay their wages if he cannot prove that money was paid, adding, "As a prime minister of a nation who represents the country, Aso needs to take responsibility for the past as well as the future." Later that month, Asō conceded that his family's mine had used POW labour.

In June 2009, former POW Joseph Coombs and the son of another, James McAnulty, travelled to Japan to personally seek an apology from Asō. Said Coombs, "We'd like an apology for the brutal treatment and the conditions we had to work under. The memory will always be there, but an apology will help ease some of the pain that we experienced." Aso Group officials met with Coombs and McAnulty, but declined to acknowledge that they had been forced to work for the company and apologise or offer compensation, even after Coombs and McAnulty showed the officials company records from 1946 which stated that POW labour had been used in the mine. Tarō Asō refused to meet the pair.

== See also ==
- Hashima Island – a Japanese island with Korean and Chinese forced laborers
