= Iwate 1st district (1947–1993) =

Former Japan House of Representatives constituency

== List of representatives ==
- Zenko Suzuki, 1947・1949・1952・1953・1955・1958・1960・1963・1967・1969・1972・1976・1979・1980・1983・1986
- Kentaro Kudo, New Life Party, 1993

== Election results ==
- 1993 Japanese general election
  - Kentaro Kudo, New Life Party, 73,452 votes
- 1986 Japanese general election
  - Zenko Suzuki
- 1983 Japanese general election
  - Zenko Suzuki
- 1980 Japanese general election
  - Zenko Suzuki
- 1979 Japanese general election
  - Zenko Suzuki
- 1976 Japanese general election
  - Zenko Suzuki
- 1972 Japanese general election
  - Zenko Suzuki
- 1969 Japanese general election
  - Zenko Suzuki
- 1967 Japanese general election
  - Zenko Suzuki
- 1963 Japanese general election
  - Zenko Suzuki
- 1960 Japanese general election
  - Zenko Suzuki
- 1958 Japanese general election
  - Zenko Suzuki
- 1955 Japanese general election
  - Zenko Suzuki
- 1953 Japanese general election
  - Zenko Suzuki
- 1952 Japanese general election
  - Zenko Suzuki
- 1949 Japanese general election
  - Zenko Suzuki
- 1947 Japanese general election
  - Zenko Suzuki
