= Zenkō Suzuki =

Prime Minister of Japan from 1980 to 1982

Zenko Suzuki
- 鈴木 善幸
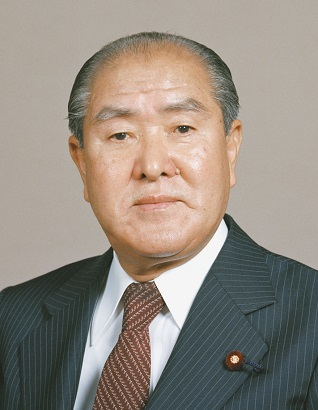
- Official portrait, 1980

Prime Minister of Japan
- In office 17 July 1980 – 27 November 1982
- Monarch: Hirohito
- Preceded by: Masayoshi Ōhira; Masayoshi Ito (acting)
- Succeeded by: Yasuhiro Nakasone

President of the Liberal Democratic Party
- In office 15 July 1980 – 25 November 1982
- Secretary-General: Yoshio Sakurauchi
- Preceded by: Masayoshi Ōhira; Eiichi Nishimura (acting)
- Succeeded by: Yasuhiro Nakasone
Ministerial offices
Minister of Agriculture and Forestry
In office 24 December 1976 – 28 November 1977
Prime Minister	Takeo Fukuda
Preceded by	Buichi Oishi
Succeeded by	Ichiro Nakagawa
Minister of Health and Welfare
In office 3 June 1965 – 3 December 1966
Prime Minister	Eisaku Satō
Preceded by	Hiroshi Kanda
Succeeded by	Hideo Bo
Chief Cabinet Secretary
In office 18 July 1964 – 9 September 1964
Prime Minister	Hayato Ikeda
Preceded by	Yasumi Kurogane
Succeeded by	Tomisaburo Hashimoto
Minister of Posts and Telecommunications
In office 19 July 1960 – 8 December 1960
Prime Minister	Hayato Ikeda
Preceded by	Haruhiko Uetake
Succeeded by	Yoshiteru Kogane

Member of the House of Representatives
- In office 25 April 1947 – 24 January 1990
- Preceded by: Constituency established
- Succeeded by: Shun'ichi Suzuki
- Constituency: Iwate 1st

Personal details
- Born: 11 January 1911 Yamada, Iwate, Japan
- Died: 19 July 2004 (aged 93) Shinjuku, Tokyo, Japan
- Party: Liberal Democratic
- Other political affiliations: JSP (1947–1948); JLP (1948–1950); DLP (1950–1955)
- Spouse: Sachi Hagiwara (m. 1939)
- Children: Chikako Suzuki; Shun'ichi Suzuki
- Relatives: Tarō Asō (son-in-law)
- Education: Tokyo University of Fisheries
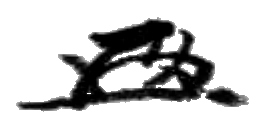
- Signature

Zenkō Suzuki (鈴木 善幸, Suzuki Zenkō; 11 January 1911 – 19 July 2004) was a Japanese politician who served as prime minister of Japan from 1980 to 1982.

Born in Iwate Prefecture, Suzuki graduated from the Tokyo University of Fisheries in 1935 and was elected to the Diet in 1947 as a member of the Japan Socialist Party, then shifted rightward and joined the Liberal Democratic Party. He briefly served as posts and telecommunications minister and cabinet secretary under Hayato Ikeda, as health and welfare minister under Eisaku Satō, and as agriculture, forests, and fisheries minister under Takeo Fukuda. After the sudden death of prime minister Masayoshi Ōhira in 1980, Suzuki assumed leadership of his faction, and he succeeded him as LDP president and prime minister until 1982.

== Early life and education ==
Zenkō Suzuki was born on 11 January 1911 in Yamada, Iwate Prefecture, the eldest son of a fishery owner. He studied at a fisheries high school and went on to study aquaculture at the Fisheries Training Institute of the Ministry of Agriculture. As a young man his political and economic views were influenced by the "cooperativism" of Toyohiko Kagawa.

After graduating in 1935, Suzuki worked in several fishery organisations. In 1939, he married Sachi Ogihara, the daughter of the president of a fisheries school.

== Political career ==
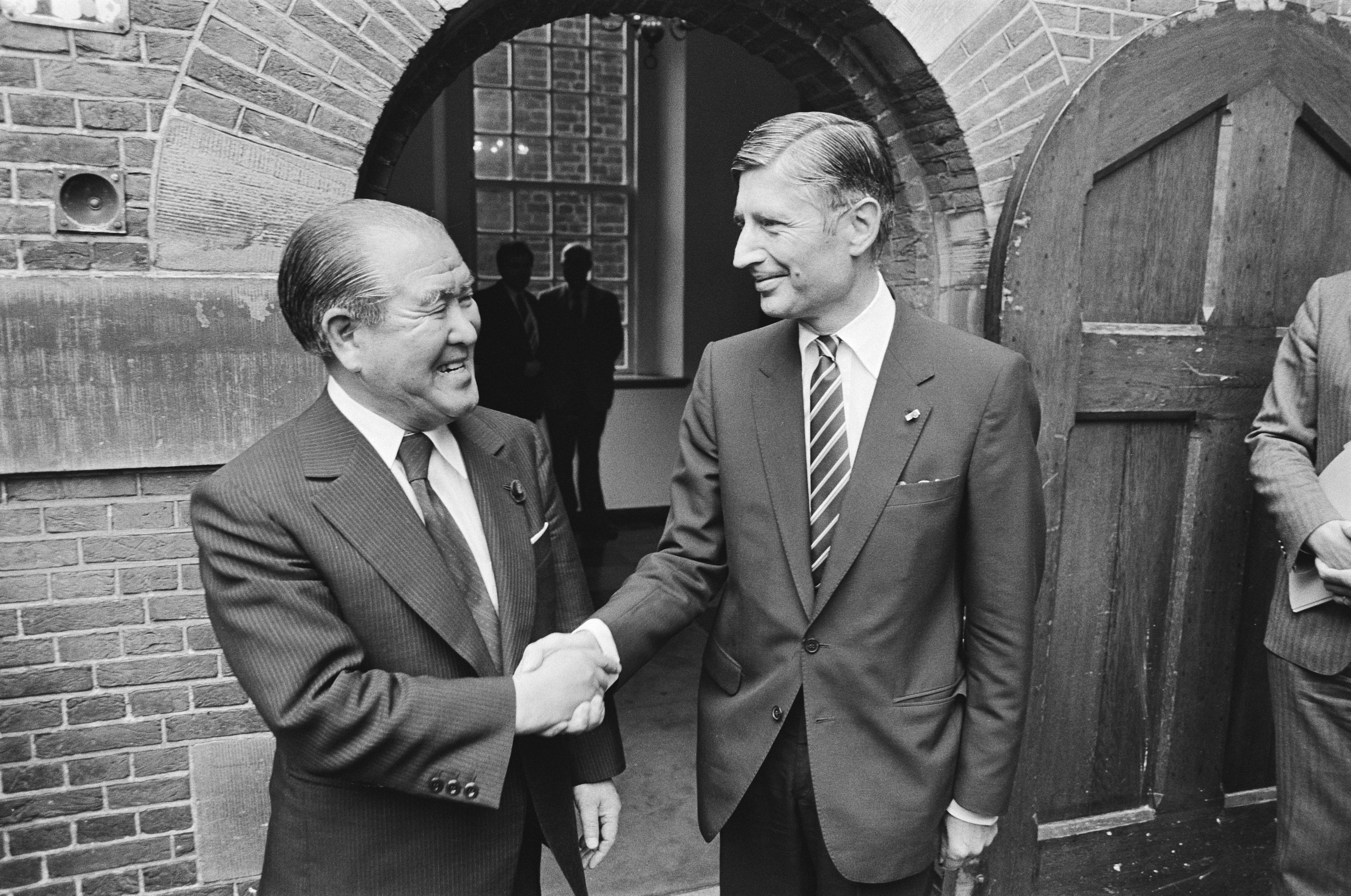
Suzuki with Dries van Agt in 1981

First elected as a member of the JSP in the 1947 election, Suzuki eventually became disillusioned with the Socialists and his politics shifted rightward. He joined the Liberal Party in 1948, and helped merge it with another right of center party to establish the Liberal Democratic Party (LDP) in 1955. He was Minister of Health from 1965 to 1966, and Minister of Agriculture & Fisheries from 1976 to 1977.

== Premiership (1980–1982) ==
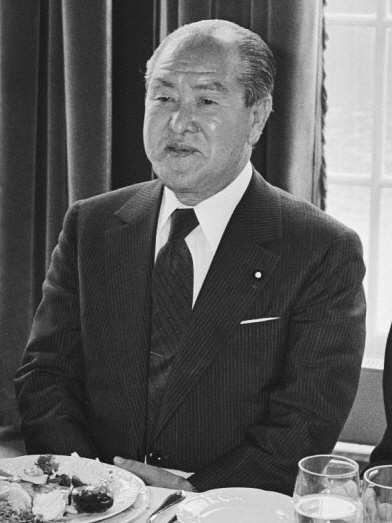
- Suzuki in the Netherlands, 1981
- Premiership of Zenkō Suzuki; 17 July 1980 – 27 November 1982
- Monarch: Emperor Shōwa
- Cabinet: Zenkō Suzuki Cabinet
- Party: Liberal Democratic
- Election: 1980
- Seat: Naikaku Sōri Daijin Kantei
- Constituency: Iwate 1st
- Emblem of the Government of Japan

Suzuki was appointed prime minister following the sudden death of Masayoshi Ōhira, who died of a heart attack during a general election campaign. The sympathy vote generated by Ohira's death resulted in a landslide for the ruling LDP, handing Suzuki the largest parliamentary majority any prime minister had enjoyed for many years. A major scandal erupted in 1982 when South Korea and China objected to the rewording of Japanese school textbooks to minimize the role of Japanese aggression in World War II. Suzuki vowed the changes would not be made to avoid offending Japan's economically important neighbors. This drew the ire of right-wing members of the LDP who believed it the issue to be an internal one and severely weakened his standing within the party. He chose not to run for reelection to the presidency of the LDP in 1982, and was succeeded by Yasuhiro Nakasone.

He served during a period of instability; cabinet members frequently changed, and parties were often split by fractional politics. His diplomatic skills allowed him to chair his party's executive council ten times, winning him support in his early career. Despite his foreign policy gaffes as prime minister, he later helped further foreign relations with the United States, during a 1988 summit with Ronald Reagan.

=== Economics ===
His government adopted some neoliberal economic policies and advocated and protected free trade.

== Personal life and death ==
Suzuki's daughter, Chikako Asō, is married to Tarō Asō, who served as the Prime Minister of Japan from 2008 to 2009. His son Shun'ichi Suzuki serves in the Diet.

Suzuki died at the International Medical Center of Japan in Tokyo of pneumonia on 19 July 2004 at the age of 93. His wife died in 2015.

== Honours ==
From the corresponding article in the Japanese Wikipedia

- Grand Cordon of the Order of the Chrysanthemum (July 2004; posthumous)
- Grand Cross of the Order of the Sun of Peru (1982)

Party political offices
Preceded by Tomisaburo Hashimoto	Chairman of the General Council, Liberal Democratic Party; 1968–1971	Succeeded by Yasuhiro Nakasone
Preceded by Yasuhiro Nakasone	Chairman of the General Council, Liberal Democratic Party; 1972–1974	Succeeded by Hirokichi Nadao
Preceded by Tadao Kuraishi	Chairman of the General Council, Liberal Democratic Party; 1979–1980	Succeeded by Susumu Nikaido
Preceded by Masayoshi Ōhira	President of the Liberal Democratic Party; 1980–1982	Succeeded by Yasuhiro Nakasone
Preceded by Masayoshi Ōhira	Head of Kōchikai; 1980–1986	Succeeded by Kiichi Miyazawa
Political offices
Preceded by Haruhiko Uetake	Minister of Posts and Telecommunications; 1960	Succeeded by Yoshiteru Kogane
Preceded by Yasumi Kurogane	Chief Cabinet Secretary; 1964	Succeeded by Tomisaburo Hashimoto
Preceded by Hiroshi Kanda	Minister of Health and Welfare; 1965–1966	Succeeded by Hideo Bō
Preceded by Buichi Ōishi	Minister of Agriculture and Forestry; 1976–1977	Succeeded by Ichiro Nakagawa
Preceded by Masayoshi Itō; Acting	Prime Minister of Japan; 1980–1982	Succeeded by Yasuhiro Nakasone
