= Shunsuke Takei =

Japanese politician

- 武井 俊輔
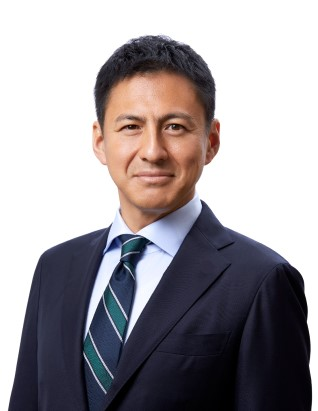
- Official portrait, 2022

Member of the House of Representatives
- Incumbent
- Assumed office 9 February 2026
- Preceded by: Multi-member district
- Constituency: Kyushu PR
- In office 17 December 2012 – 9 October 2024
- Preceded by: Hidesaburo Kawamura
- Succeeded by: Multi-member district
- Constituency: Miyazaki 1st (2012–2021); Kyushu PR (2021–2024)

Member of the Miyazaki Prefectural Assembly
- In office 2007–2011
- Constituency: Miyazaki City

Personal details
- Born: 29 March 1975 (age 51) Miyazaki, Miyazaki Prefecture, Japan
- Party: Liberal Democratic
- Other political affiliations: Independent (until 2011)
- Education: Chuo University; Waseda University
- Website: Shunsuke Takei website

Shunsuke Takei (武井 俊輔, Takei Shunsuke; born 29 March 1975) is a Japanese politician of the Liberal Democratic Party, who serves as a member of the House of Representatives.

== Early years ==
Takei was born in Miyazaki City, Miyazaki Prefecture, in 1975. After graduating from the Faculty of Letters at Chuo University, he joined Miyazaki Kotsu Co., Ltd., where he was in charge of introducing "Miyako Buska," an IC card system for local route buses. In 2003, he left the company and studied abroad in Singapore from February to August. In September 2003, he entered the Graduate School of Public Management at Waseda University, completing his studies in September 2005 and earning a Master of Public Management (Professional). Subsequently, he joined Rakuten Group, Inc. and was seconded to Rakuten Travel, where he managed tourism projects, including bus tours.

== Political career ==
In 2007, Takei ran for the Miyazaki Prefectural Assembly as an independent and was elected.

In 2011, Takei became the head of LDP Miyazaki 1st branch.

In the 2012 general election, Takei ran for Miyazaki 1st and defeated DPJ Incumbent Hidesaburo Kawamura and Restoration Party's Nariaki Nakayama.

In the 2014 general election, Takei defeated Innovation Party's Itsuki Toyama and hold the seat.

In 2016, Takei was appointed to Parliamentary Vice-Minister for Foreign Affairs in the Third Abe Second reshuffled cabinet.

In the 2017 general election, Takei defeated Kibō’s Toyama and hold the seat.

In the 2021 general election, LDP's Miyazaki prefectural federation asked LDP headquarters to stop the nomination of Takei due to the scandal involving his secretary. However, LDP headquarters nominated Takei as a candidate. Noriko Wakitani, member of the LDP's Miyazaki prefectural assembly who opposed Takei's nomination , left LDP and announced her candidacy.

As a result, Takei lost to CDP’s Sō Watanabe after a close race, partly because Wakitani's candidacy split votes of LDP supporters. He won a seat in Kyushu PR.

In 2022, Takei was appointed to State Minister for Foreign Affairs in the Second Kishida First reshuffled cabinet.

In the 2024 general election, Takei lost to CDP's Watanabe by a large margin because of a number of scandals and lost re-election.

In the 2026 general election, Takei lost to CRA's Watanabe again but won a seat in Kyushu PR.

== Scandals related to his staff ==
=== 2019 Drunk driving collision by his private secretary ===
On September 29, 2019, a private secretary for Takei caused a collision with a Tokyo Metropolitan Police Department vehicle while driving under the influence of alcohol. Immediately prior to the accident, the secretary had dropped Takei off at Haneda Airport. Regarding the incident, Takei stated, "I did not notice anything unusual while inside the car".

=== 2021 Hit-and-run incident by an official secretary ===
In June 2021, a car carrying Shunsuke Takei was involved in a hit-and-run accident. Dashcam footage reportedly captured Takei's voice saying, "just go", at the time of the incident. However, this statement was overlooked, and he was not charged with incitement of a hit-and-run. Due to the political calendar, the investigation could not proceed until after the election. On October 31, Takei secured his fourth term through Kyushu PR in the House of Representatives election. Seven months later, in January 2022, he was referred to prosecutors on suspicion of operating a vehicle without a valid inspection or insurance, but the charges were dropped in March.

On the evening of June 8, 2021, Takei's official secretary was driving a vehicle registered under Takei's name—which had an expired inspection and compulsory liability insurance—near an intersection in Roppongi, Minato-ku, Tokyo. The vehicle struck a bicycle, causing minor injuries to the cyclist, and fled the scene. After the accident, the victim chased the car and blocked it while it was stopped at a red light. Takei, who stepped out from the back seat, reportedly made no effort to assist the victim, stating, "I have nothing to do with this.

For the October House of Representatives election, LDP Miyazaki Prefectural federation requested that LDP headquarters withhold Takei's nomination. However, LDP headquarters proceeded to nominate him anyway. This led to a backlash from local lawmakers, resulting in a "conservative split" as a local LDP lawmaker in the Miyazaki Prefectural Assembly announced their candidacy to oppose Takei's nomination. As a result, Takei lost to CDP's Watanabe after a close race.

On January 5, 2022, seven months after the accident, the Metropolitan Police Department referred Takei to prosecutors on suspicion of violating the Road Transport Vehicle Act (no inspection) and the Automobile Liability Security Act (no insurance). The secretary at the time was also referred to prosecutors on charges. On March 30, the Tokyo District Public Prosecutors Office decided not to prosecute Takei due to insufficient evidence, stating there was no conclusive proof that he was aware the vehicle was uninspected or uninsured. The secretary was issued a summary indictment for professional negligence resulting in injury.

=== 2024 Speeding by his official secretary ===
On 28 April 2024, a vehicle carrying Takei, driven by his official secretary, was found to be significantly exceeding the speed limit while traveling on a national highway in Nichinan, Miyazaki Prefecture. Although the speed limit in the area was 60 km/h, a photo Takei took from the back seat and posted to X (formerly Twitter) clearly showed the speedometer at 91 km/h. The incident came to light after X users quoted his post, causing it to go viral. On May 2, Takei held a press conference in Miyazaki City to apologize, stating: "I was deeply immersed in my work and was not aware we were speeding. I sincerely apologize for this oversight".
