= Osaka 16th district =

- Parliamentary constituency for the Japanese House of Representatives
- Numbered map of the Osaka Prefecture single seats
- Prefecture: Osaka
- Proportional District: Kinki
- Electorate: 325,202

Current constituency
- Created: 1994
- Seats: One
- Party: Ishin
- Representative: Masaki Kuroda
- Municipalities: Higashi-ku, Kita-ku, and Sakai-ku of Sakai city.

Osaka 16th district (大阪府第16区, Osaka-fu dai-ju-rokku or simply 大阪16区, Osaka-ju-Roku ) is a single-member constituency of the House of Representatives in the national Diet of Japan located in Osaka Prefecture.

== Areas covered ==
=== Since 2013 ===
- Part of Sakai
  - Higashi-ku
  - Kita-ku
  - Sakai-ku

=== 2002 - 2013 ===
- Part of Sakai

=== 1994 - 2002 ===
- Part of Sakai

== List of representatives ==
Election	Representative	Party	Notes
1996	Kazuo Kitagawa	NFP	
2000	Kazuo Kitagawa	Komeito	
2003	Kazuo Kitagawa	Komeito	
2005	Kazuo Kitagawa	Komeito	
2009	Hiroyuki Moriyama	Democratic	
2012	Kazuo Kitagawa	Komeito	
2014	Kazuo Kitagawa	Komeito	
2017	Kazuo Kitagawa	Komeito	
2021	Kazuo Kitagawa	Komeito	
2024	Masaki Kuroda	Ishin	
2026	Masaki Kuroda	Ishin	

== Election results ==
=== 2026 ===
2026
Party	Candidate	Votes	%	±%
Ishin	Masaki Kuroda	73,063	41.2	▲3.95
Centrist Reform	Hiroyuki Moriyama	47,844	27.0	▼3.0
LDP	Haruhisa Hada	36,006	20.3	
Sanseitō	Wakako Ikegami	20,249	11.4	
Registered electors		324,169		
Turnout			56.13	▲2.06
Ishin hold				

=== 2024 ===
2024
Party	Candidate	Votes	%	±%
Ishin	Masaki Kuroda	63,288	37.29	New
Komeito	Kanae Yamamoto	55,474	32.69	−18.12
CDP	Hiroyuki Moriyama (elected in Kinki PR block)	50,943	30.02	−13.59
Majority		7,814	4.60	
Registered electors		324,209		
Turnout			54.07	▼1.43
Ishin gain from Komeito				

=== 2021 ===
2021
Party	Candidate	Votes	%	±%
Komeito	Kazuo Kitagawa	84,563	50.81	−3.23
CDP	Hiroyuki Moriyama (Won PR seat)	72,571	43.61	New
Anti-NHK	Kyoko Nishiwaki	9,288	5.58	New
Majority		11,992	7.20	
Registered electors		326,278		
Turnout			55.50	▲8.75
Komeito hold				

=== 2017 ===
2017
Party	Candidate	Votes	%	±%
Komeito	Kazuo Kitagawa	77,335	54.04	
CDP	Hiroyuki Moriyama (Won PR seat)	65,780	45.96	New
Majority		11,555	8.08	
Registered electors		325,021		
Turnout			46.75	▼4.41
Komeito hold				

=== 2014 ===
2014
Party	Candidate	Votes	%	±%
Komeito	Kazuo Kitagawa	66,673	43.19	
Democratic	Hiroyuki Moriyama	38,331	24.83	
Future Generations	Shingo Nishimura	26,567	17.21	New
JCP	Shuichi Masu	22,809	14.77	
Majority		28,342	18.36	
Registered electors		316,965		
Turnout			51.16	▼6.71
Komeito hold				

=== 2012 ===
2012
Party	Candidate	Votes	%	±%
Komeito	Kazuo Kitagawa	86,464	50.81	
Democratic	Hiroyuki Moriyama	42,328	24.88	
JCP	Tsutomu Okai	23,652	13.90	
21st Century Japan Restoration Party	Masaru Nakamura	17,711	10.41	New
Majority		44,136	25.93	
Registered electors				
Turnout			57.87	
Komeito gain from Democratic				

=== 2009 ===
2009
Party	Candidate	Votes	%	±%
Democratic	Hiroyuki Moriyama	100,548	48.05	
Komeito	Kazuo Kitagawa	84,883	40.56	
JCP	Shizuki Kishigami	19,379	9.26	
Happiness Realization	Yoshimori Nakagawa	4,459	2.13	New
Majority		15,665	7.49	
Registered electors				
Turnout				
Democratic gain from Komeito				

=== 2005 ===
2005
Party	Candidate	Votes	%	±%
Komeito	Kazuo Kitagawa	99,919	51.46	
Democratic	Yoshikazu Tarui	70,048	36.07	
JCP	Shizuki Kishigami	24,212	12.47	
Majority		29,871	15.39	
Registered electors				
Turnout				
Komeito hold				

=== 2003 ===
2003
Party	Candidate	Votes	%	±%
Komeito	Kazuo Kitagawa	74,718	46.12	
Democratic	Yoshikazu Tarui (Won PR seat)	63,867	39.42	New
JCP	Taisuke Sugano	23,434	14.46	
Majority		10,851	6.70	
Registered electors				
Turnout				
Komeito hold				

=== 2000 ===
2000
Party	Candidate	Votes	%	±%
Komeito	Kazuo Kitagawa	64,150	39.11	New
Independent	Taizo Masago	51,055	31.13	New
JCP	Taisuke Sugano	48,815	29.76	
Majority		13,095	7.98	
Registered electors				
Turnout				
Komeito hold				

=== 1996 ===
1996
Party	Candidate	Votes	%	±%
New Frontier	Kazuo Kitagawa	61,084	38.29	New
LDP	Taizo Masago	41,787	26.20	New
JCP	Shizuki Kishigami	33,153	20.78	New
Democratic	Masanobu Nishino	23,489	14.73	New
Majority		19,297	12.09	
Registered electors				
Turnout				
New Frontier win (new seat)				
