= Shigeharu Aoyama =

Japanese politician

- 青山 繁晴
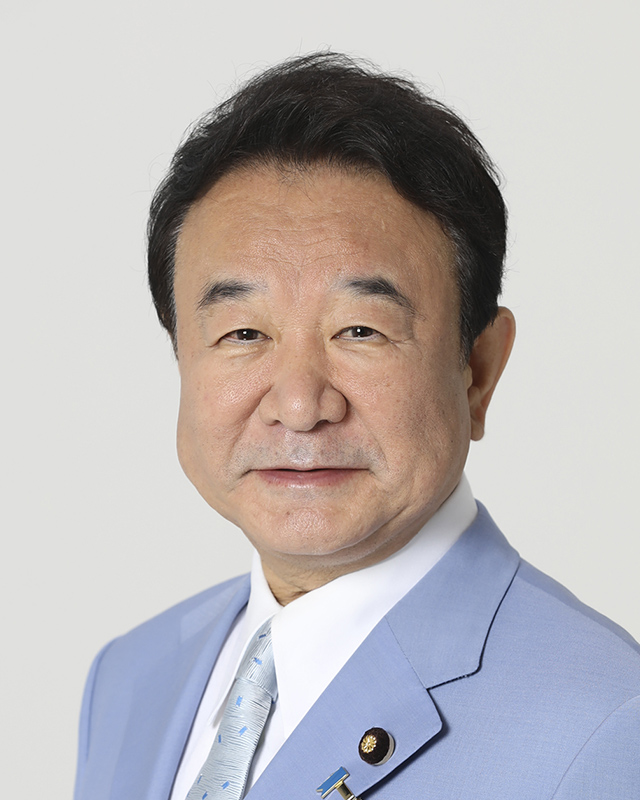
- Official portrait, 2025

Member of the House of Representatives
- Incumbent
- Assumed office 8 February 2026
- Preceded by: Hiromasa Nakano
- Constituency: Hyōgo 8th

Member of the House of Councillors
- In office 26 July 2016 – 27 January 2026
- Preceded by: Multi-member district
- Succeeded by: Yoshio Kimura
- Constituency: National PR

Personal details
- Born: 25 July 1952 (age 74) Nagata-ku, Kobe, Japan
- Party: Liberal Democratic
- Spouse: Chiharu Aoyama (m. 1979)
- Children: 1
- Education: Waseda University
- Occupation: Economist • Researcher • Politician

Shigeharu Aoyama (青山繁晴; born 25 July 1952) is a Japanese politician serving in the House of Representatives. Between 2016 and 2026, he was in the House of Councillors of Japan.

He represented the National proportional representation block. He has served on the Committee on Economy and Industry (as Director); Committee on Budget; and on the Special Committee on Official Development Assistance and Related Matters.

== Early life ==
Aoyama was born on 25 July 1952, in the Hyogo Prefecture of Japan. He graduated from Junshin Gakuin Junior and Senior High School in March 1971 and entered the Faculty of Letters at Keio University the following month. In February 1974, he withdrew from Keio University and sat for the entrance examination to the Department of Economics at Waseda University's School of Political Science and Economics. Aoyama graduated from the school of political science and economics of Waseda University in 1979.

== Career ==
Prior to his election to the House of Councillors, Aoyama worked as a journalist and founded a think tank. A summary of his career is below:

- 1979-98: Worked as a journalist for Kyodo News.
- 1998-2002: Researcher for Mitsubishi Research Institute (think tank).
- 2002: Founded "Japan's Independent Institute", a think tank (separated from Mitsubishi).

In 2016, he was elected to the House of Councillors.
