= Hyōgo 8th district =

Legislative district of Japan

Hyogo 8th district (兵庫県第8区, Hyōgo-ken Dai-hachiku), also referred to as Hyōgo hachi-ku (兵庫8区), is a constituency of the House of Representatives in the Diet of Japan. It is located in southwestern Hyōgo and consists of the city of Amagasaki. As of September 2015, 379,207 eligible voters were registered in the district. It is one of the 48 districts in the Kansai region that form the Kinki proportional representation block.

The district was established as part of the electoral reform of 1994; the area was previously part of Hyōgo 2nd district that elected five representatives by single non-transferable vote.

Since the district's creation, it has been represented by: former Minister of Land, Infrastructure and Transport Tetsuzo Fuyushiba, former governor of Nagano Prefecture Yasuo Tanaka, and Hiromasa Nakano, who worked under Fuyushiba in the Ministry of Land, Infrastructure and Transport.

== List of representatives ==
Representative	Party	Dates	
Tetsuzo Fuyushiba	New Frontier Party(1996–98)	1996 – 2009	
Tetsuzo Fuyushiba	Komeito(1998-2009)	1996 – 2009	
Yasuo Tanaka	New Party Nippon	2009 – 2012	
Hiromasa Nakano	Komeito	2012 – 2026	
Shigeharu Aoyama	LDP	2026 –	Former member of the House of Councillors

== Election results ==
2026
Party	Candidate	Votes	%	±%
LDP	Shigeharu Aoyama	85,970	43.3	
Ishin	Junko Tokuyasu	48,094	24.2	▼7.9
Centrist Reform	Yoshie Hirokawa	42,989	21.7	
JCP	Masae Bandō	11,252	5.7	▼8.6
Reiwa	Uiko Hasegawa	10,210	5.1	▼1.8
Registered electors		382,841		
Turnout			52.93	▲2.18
LDP gain from Komeito				

2024
Party	Candidate	Votes	%	±%
Komeito	Hiromasa Nakano	71,784	38.30	▼20.5
Ishin	Junko Tokuyasu	60,150	32.09	New
JCP	Jun Komura	26,873	14.34	▼12.27
Reiwa	Okan Yahata	12,920	6.89	▼7.71
Collaborative Party	Maria Yuki Hayashi	2,555	1.36	New
Sanseitō	Seiichirō Aburatani	13,155	7.02	New
Turnout			50.75	▲1.52

2021
Party	Candidate	Votes	%	±%
Komeito	Hiromasa Nakano	100,313	58.80	▼4.76
JCP	Jun Komura	45,403	26.61	▼9.83
Reiwa	Megumi Tsuji	24,880	14.6	
Turnout			48.83	▲6.74

2017
Party	Candidate	Votes	%	±%
Komeito	Hiromasa Nakano	94,116	63.6	▲2.7
JCP	Terufumi Horiuchi	53,964	36.4	▼2.7
Turnout			42.09	▼3.78

2014
Party	Candidate	Votes	%	±%
Komeito	Hiromasa Nakano	94,687	60.9	14.3
JCP	Etsuko Shōmoto	60,849	39.1	28.3
Turnout			45.87	▼11.64

2012
Party	Candidate	Votes	%	±%
Komeito	Hiromasa Nakano	97,562	46.6	5.3
NP-Nippon	Yasuo Tanaka	62,697	30.0	▼12.2
Democratic	Hideko Muroi	26,246	12.6	12.6
JCP	Etsuko Shōmoto	22,645	10.8	2.7
Turnout			57.51	▼9.76

2009
Party	Candidate	Votes	%	±%
NP-Nippon	Yasuo Tanaka	106,225	42.2	
Komeito	Tetsuzo Fuyushiba	103,918	41.3	▼5.0
JCP	Etsuko Shōmoto	20,327	8.1	▼4.5
Social Democratic	Banko Ichiki	18,770	7.5	1.6
Happiness Realization	Tomokazu Sumide	2,532	1.0	1.0
Turnout			67.27	

2005
Party	Candidate	Votes	%	±%
Komeito	Tetsuzo Fuyushiba	109,957	46.3	
Democratic	Kunihiko Muroi	83,288	35.1	
JCP	Etsuko Shōmoto	29,986	12.6	
Social Democratic	Munenori Ueda	14,019	5.9	
Turnout				
