= Sō Watanabe =

Japanese politician

- 渡辺 創
- Watanabe in 2026

President of the Centrist Reform Alliance
- Incumbent
- Assumed office 17 September 2026
- Preceded by: Junya Ogawa

Member of the House of Representatives
- Incumbent
- Assumed office 2 November 2021
- Preceded by: Shunsuke Takei
- Constituency: Miyazaki 1st

Personal details
- Born: 3 October 1977 (age 49) Miyazaki City, Miyazaki Prefecture, Japan
- Party: CRA (since 2026)
- Other political affiliations: DPJ (until 2016); DP (2016–2018); CDP (2018–2026)
- Education: Niigata University

Sō Watanabe (Japanese: 渡辺 創, Hepburn: Watanabe Sō; born 3 October 1977) is a Japanese politician who has been the president of the Centrist Reform Alliance since September 2026 and as a member of the House of Representatives since 2021. He was previously a member of the Constitutional Democratic and Democratic parties.

Watanabe became the sole member of the CRA following the decision to disband the party in September 2026.

== Career ==
Watanabe was born in Miyazaki City and studied law at Niigata University. After graduation, he began working at the Mainichi Shimbun. He resigned from the newspaper in 2009 in order to enter politics as a member of the Democratic Party of Japan.

Watanabe ran in the Miyazaki at-large district in the 2010 House of Councillors election, but lost to LDP incumbent Shinpei Matsushita. The following year, he was elected to the Miyazaki Prefectural Assembly for the first time. He was re-elected in 2015.

Watanabe left Democratic Party on 5 February 2018 to join Constitutional Democratic Party on 5 February 2018. He ran for re-election as a CDP candidate in 2019 and was successful.

On 6 September 2021, Watanabe resigned as a member of the prefectural assembly to run for Miyazaki 1st district in the 2021 Japanese general election and defeated incumbent Shunsuke Takei by a very narrow margin of just over 1,000 votes.

In the 2021 CDP presidential election, Watanabe served as an endorser of Chinami Nishimura. In the 2024 presidential election, he was an endorser of Yukio Edano.

Watanabe was re-elected in 2024 by a greatly increased margin of 30,000 votes.

In January 2026, he joined most members of the CDP lower house group in joining the new Centrist Reform Alliance (CRA). He ran again in the 2026 election and was re-elected by a margin of 14,000 votes despite the party's enormous defeat. This gave him the largest margin of the seven surviving CRA winners in single-member constituencies. He was considered a potential candidate for the subsequent leadership election, but did not stand.

After the decision was made to disband the CRA in September 2026, the party announced that Watanabe would remain as its sole member for a period of months in order to manage its dissolution, settle funding issues, and support defeated candidates.

== Political positions ==
In response to a 2021 election questionnaires from the NHK and Asahi Shimbun, Watanabe stated that he opposed amending the Constitution, supported allowing separate surnames for married couples, supported legalising same-sex marriage, and supported phasing out nuclear energy.
