= Kazuyoshi Akaba =

Japanese politician

- 赤羽 一嘉
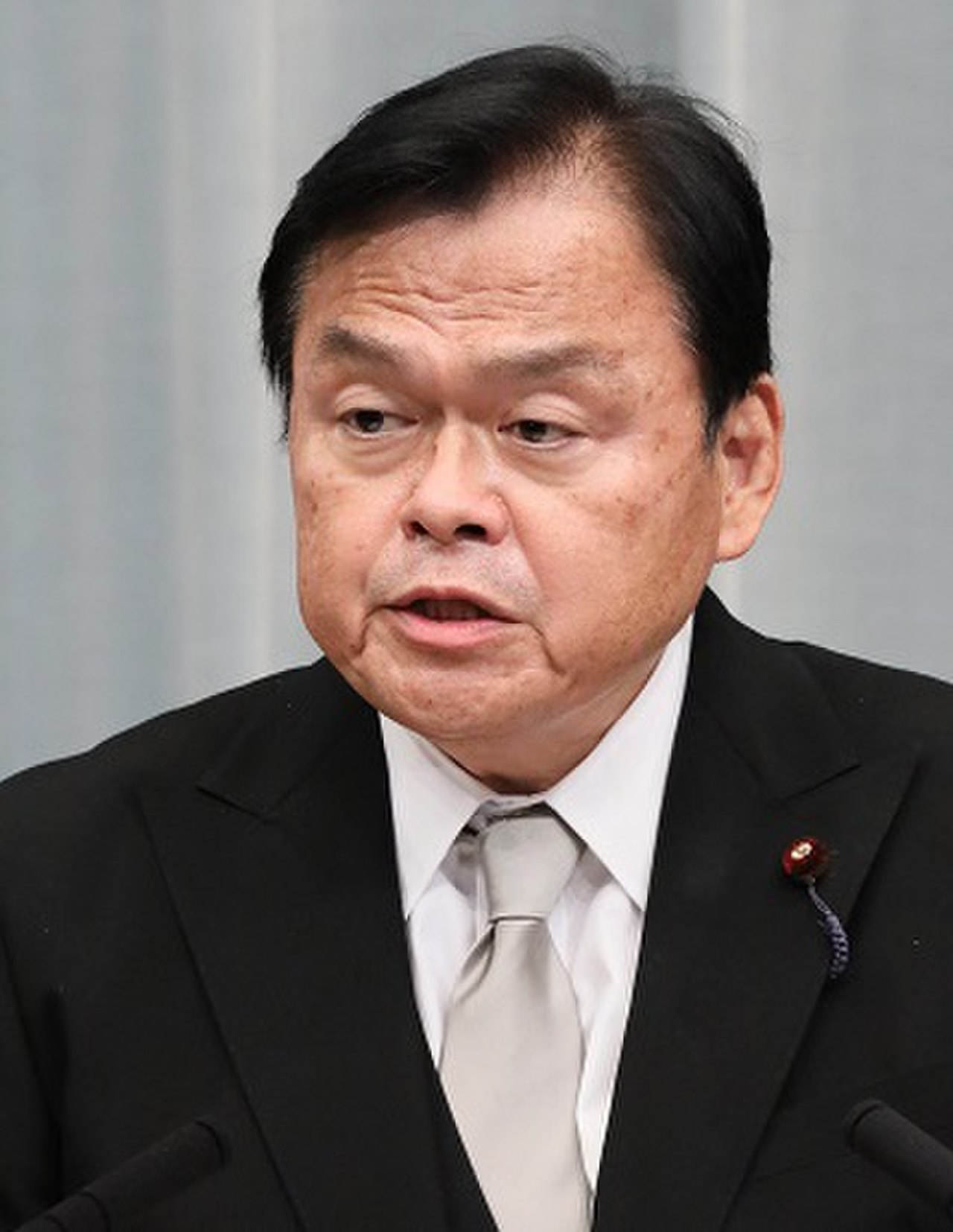
- Akaba in 2020

Minister of Land, Infrastructure, Transport and Tourism
- In office 11 September 2019 – 4 October 2021
- Prime Minister: Shinzo Abe; Yoshihide Suga
- Preceded by: Keiichi Ishii
- Succeeded by: Tetsuo Saito

Member of the House of Representatives
- Incumbent
- Assumed office 16 December 2012
- Preceded by: Koichi Mukoyama
- Constituency: Hyōgo 2nd (2012–2026); Kinki PR (2026–present)
- In office 18 July 1993 – 30 August 2009
- Preceded by: Ichirō Watanabe
- Succeeded by: Koichi Mukoyama
- Constituency: Hyōgo 1st (1993–1996); Hyōgo 2nd (1996–2012)

Personal details
- Born: 7 May 1958 (age 68) Nakaochiai, Shinjuku, Tokyo, Japan
- Party: Komeito (1998–2026; since 2026)
- Other political affiliations: CGP (1993–1996); NFP (1996–1998); Komeito (1998–2026); CRA (2026)
- Children: 2
- Education: Keio University

Kazuyoshi Akaba (Japanese: 赤羽 一嘉, Hepburn: Akaba Kazuyoshi; born 7 May 1958) is a Japanese politician who served as the Minister of Land, Infrastructure, Transport and Tourism from September 2019 to October 2021. He is also a member of the House of Representatives, representing the Hyogo 2nd district since 2012.

A member of Komeito, he was elected to the House of Representatives for the first time in 1993. He served as a representative until 2009, ending when he lost his re-election bid. In 2012, he ran again and won back the seat.

Political offices
Preceded by Keiichi Ishii	Minister of Land, Infrastructure, Transport and Tourism; 2019–2021	Succeeded by Tetsuo Saito
Party political offices
Preceded by Shigeki Sato	Chairman of the Komeito Central Executive Committee; 2024–2026	Succeeded by Masaaki Taniai
