= Nagano at-large district =

Japan House of Councillors constituency

- 長野県選挙区
- Parliamentary constituency for the House of Councillors
- Prefecture: Nagano
- Electorate: 1,710,930 (as of September 2022)

Current constituency
- Created: 1947
- Seats: 2
- Councillors: Class of 2019: Jiro Hata (Note: Elected in a by-election following the death of his brother, Yuichiro Hata, from COVID-19) (CDP); Class of 2022: Hideya Sugio (CDP)

The Nagano at-large district (長野県選挙区, Nagano-ken senkyo-ku) is a multi-member constituency of the House of Councillors in the Diet of Japan. It consists of Nagano Prefecture and elects four Councillors, two every three years by single non-transferable vote (SNTV) for six-year terms. It is unique among similar rural, two-seat districts for its loyalty to opposition parties; an LDP candidate has not won the district since it became a two-seat contest in 2016. The last time it won the prefecture-wide vote was in 2013, when the DP did not win a single prefecture nationwide, and it had remained an opposition bulwark since well before the House of Councilors reform election in 1995.

== Elected Councillors ==
class of 1947		election year	class of 1950	
#1 (1947: #1, 6-year term)	#2 (1947: #2, 6-year term)	election year	#1 (1947: #3, 3-year term)	#2 (1947: #4, 3-year term)
Sanshichi Hanyū (JSP)	Shirō Kiuchi (DP)	1947	Tatsuya Yonekura (Coop.)	Morio Kinoshita † 1947 (JLP)
Sanshichi Hanyū (JSP)	Shirō Kiuchi (DP)	1948 by-el.	Tatsuya Yonekura (Coop.)	Uemon Ikeda (JLP)
Sanshichi Hanyū (JSP)	Shirō Kiuchi (DP)	1950	Kotora Tanahashi (JSP)	Uemon Ikeda (LP)
Sanshichi Hanyū (leftist faction JSP)	Shirō Kiuchi (Yoshida faction LP)	1953	Kotora Tanahashi (JSP)	Uemon Ikeda (LP)
Sanshichi Hanyū (leftist faction JSP)	Shirō Kiuchi (Yoshida faction LP)	1956	Kotora Tanahashi (JSP)	Kunitarō Koyama (LDP)
Sanshichi Hanyū (JSP)	Shirō Kiuchi (LDP)	1959	Kotora Tanahashi (JSP)	Kunitarō Koyama (LDP)
Sanshichi Hanyū (JSP)	Shirō Kiuchi (LDP)	1962	Torao Hayashi (JSP)	Kunitarō Koyama (LDP)
Sanshichi Hanyū (JSP)	Shirō Kiuchi (LDP)	1965	Torao Hayashi (JSP)	Kunitarō Koyama (LDP)
Sanshichi Hanyū (JSP)	Shirō Kiuchi (LDP)	1968	Torao Hayashi (JSP)	Kunitarō Koyama (LDP)
Sanshichi Hanyū (JSP)	Shirō Kiuchi (LDP)	1971	Torao Hayashi (JSP)	Kunitarō Koyama (LDP)
Sanshichi Hanyū (JSP)	Shirō Kiuchi (LDP)	1974	Ippei Koyama (JSP)	Tadao Natsume (LDP)
Maki Murasawa (JSP)	Shin'ichirō Shimojō (LDP)	1977	Ippei Koyama (JSP)	Tadao Natsume (LDP)
Maki Murasawa (JSP)	Shin'ichirō Shimojō (LDP)	1980	Tadao Natsume (LDP)	Ippei Koyama (JSP)
Shin'ichirō Shimojō (LDP)	Maki Murasawa (JSP)	1983	Tadao Natsume (LDP)	Ippei Koyama (JSP)
Shin'ichirō Shimojō (LDP)	Maki Murasawa (JSP)	1986	Ippei Koyama (JSP)	Kazuto Mukaiyama (LDP)
Maki Murasawa (JSP)	Shin'ichirō Shimojō (LDP)	1989	Ippei Koyama (JSP)	Kazuto Mukaiyama (LDP)
Maki Murasawa (JSP)	Shin'ichirō Shimojō (LDP)	1992	Toshimi Kitazawa (LDP)	Kiyoshi Imai (JSP)
Mineo Koyama (NFP)	Maki Murasawa † 1999 (JSP)	1995	Toshimi Kitazawa (LDP)	Kiyoshi Imai (JSP)
Mineo Koyama (NFP)	Maki Murasawa † 1999 (JSP)	1998	Toshimi Kitazawa (DPJ)	Masatoshi Wakabayashi # 2010 (LDP)
Mineo Koyama (NFP)	Yūichirō Hata (DPJ)	1999 by-el.	Toshimi Kitazawa (DPJ)	Masatoshi Wakabayashi # 2010 (LDP)
Hiromi Yoshida (LDP)	Yūichirō Hata (DPJ)	2001	Toshimi Kitazawa (DPJ)	Masatoshi Wakabayashi # 2010 (LDP)
Hiromi Yoshida (LDP)	Yūichirō Hata (DPJ)	2004	Toshimi Kitazawa (DPJ)	Masatoshi Wakabayashi # 2010 (LDP)
Yūichirō Hata (DPJ)	Hiromi Yoshida (LDP)	2007	Toshimi Kitazawa (DPJ)	Masatoshi Wakabayashi # 2010 (LDP)
Yūichirō Hata (DPJ)	Hiromi Yoshida (LDP)	2010	Kenta Wakabayashi (LDP)	Toshimi Kitazawa (DPJ)

Party affiliations as of election day; #: resigned; †: died in office.

== Recent election results ==
2010
Party	Candidate	Votes	%	±%
LDP	Kenta Wakabayashi	293,539	26.4	
DPJ	Toshimi Kitazawa	290,027	26.1	
DPJ	Yōko Takashima	217,655	19.6	
YP	Yōsei Ide	183,949	16.6	
JCP	Sanae Nakano	116,496	10.5	
HRP	Hiroaki Usuda	8,959	0.8	
Turnout		1,138,024	64.72	

2007
Party	Candidate	Votes	%	±%
DPJ	Yūichirō Hata	538,690	47.9	
LDP (Kōmeitō support)	Hiromi Yoshida	301,635	26.8	
JCP	Sanae Nakano	194,407	17.3	
SDP	Hiroji Nakagawa	89,579	8.0	
Turnout		1,149,558	65.04	
