= Kanae Yamamoto (politician) =

Japanese politician (born 1971)

- 山本 香苗
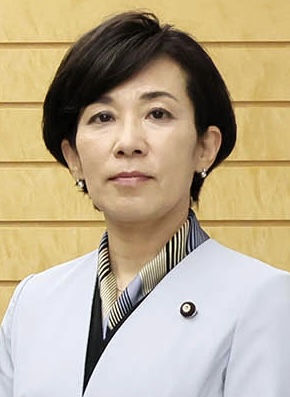
- Yamamoto in 2024

Member of the House of Representatives
- Incumbent
- Assumed office 9 February 2026
- Constituency: Kinki PR

Member of the House of Councillors
- In office 29 July 2001 – 15 October 2024
- Preceded by: Multi-member district
- Succeeded by: Jirō Takahashi
- Constituency: National PR

Personal details
- Born: 14 May 1971 (age 55) Hiroshima, Japan
- Party: Komeito (until 2026; since 2026)
- Other political affiliations: CRA (2026)
- Education: Kyoto University

Kanae Yamamoto (山本 香苗, Yamamoto Kanae; born 1971) is a Japanese politician of the Komeito who served as a member of the House of Councillors from 2001 to 2024.

A native of Hiroshima Prefecture and graduate of Kyoto University, she joined the Ministry of Foreign Affairs in 1995, attending Istanbul University while in the ministry. In 2001, after leaving the ministry, she was elected to the House of Councillors for the first time.

Yamamoto left the House of Councillors to run from Osaka 16th district, in the 2024 House of Representatives election, to replace the retiring Kazuo Kitagawa, but was defeated by Masaki Kuroda of the Japan Innovation Party.
