= Keiichi Ishii =

Japanese politician (born 1958)

- 石井 啓一
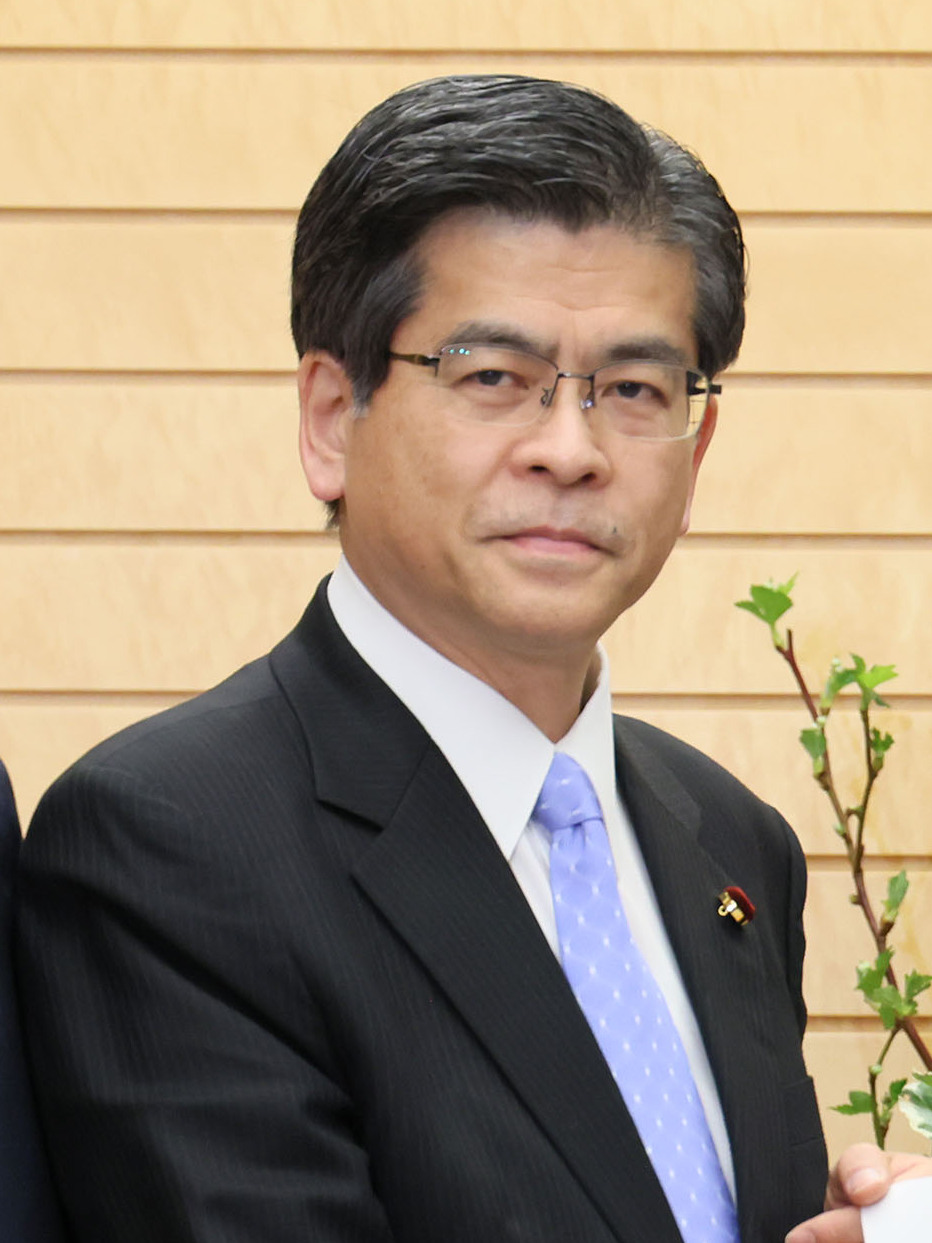
- Ishii in 2023

Vice Speaker of the House of Representatives
- Incumbent
- Assumed office 18 February 2026
- Speaker: Eisuke Mori
- Preceded by: Kōichirō Genba

Chief Representative of Komeito
- In office 28 September 2024 – 9 November 2024
- Preceded by: Natsuo Yamaguchi
- Succeeded by: Tetsuo Saito

Minister of Land, Infrastructure, Transport and Tourism
- In office 7 October 2015 – 11 September 2019
- Prime Minister: Shinzo Abe
- Preceded by: Akihiro Ota
- Succeeded by: Kazuyoshi Akaba

Member of the House of Representatives
- Incumbent
- Assumed office 9 February 2026
- Constituency: Northern Kanto PR
- In office 19 July 1993 – 9 October 2024
- Constituency: Tokyo 5th (1993–1996); Tokyo PR (1996–2000); Northern Kanto PR (2000–2024)

Personal details
- Born: 20 March 1958 (age 68) Toshima, Tokyo, Japan
- Party: Komeito (1998–2026; since 2026)
- Other political affiliations: Komeito (1992–1994); NFP (1994–1998); CRA (2026)
- Education: University of Tokyo
- Occupation: Construction engineer • Politician

Keiichi Ishii (石井 啓一, Ishii Keiichi; born 20 March 1958) is a Japanese politician who serves as Vice Speaker of the House of Representatives since February 2026. He was previously chief representative of Komeito in 2024, secretary general of the same party from 2020 to 2024, and Minister of Land, Infrastructure, Transport and Tourism under Prime Minister Shinzo Abe from 2015 to 2019.

Born in Tokyo and educated as an engineer at the University of Tokyo, he served as an official in the Ministry of Construction before entering politics. He was elected as a member of the House of Representatives in 1993 and served in the House until his defeat in 2024. He resigned as Komeito chief representative after his defeat, having held the position for just over a month.

Ishii returned to the House of Representatives in the 2026 election as a candidate of the Centrist Reform Alliance and was elected Vice Speaker of the House.

== Biography ==
Ishii was born in Toshima, Tokyo, on 20 March 1958. His father was a tailor. Ishii studied civil engineering at the University of Tokyo and joined the Ministry of Construction after graduating in 1981. At the ministry, he worked on public works projects, including roads and bridges. He left the ministry in 1992, when he was recruited into politics by the Komeito diet member Takeshi Osada. Ishii was elected to the House of Representatives for the first time in the 1993 election, as a Komeito candidate in the 5th Tokyo district.

Ishii became chairman of the Komeito Policy Research Council in 2010 and was instrumental in building consensus for the integrated social security and tax reform adopted under the Noda Cabinet. In October 2015, Ishii joined the cabinet of Prime Minister Shinzo Abe as Minister of Land, Infrastructure, Transport and Tourism. He was replaced as minister in September 2019 and was subsequently appointed as Secretary General of the Komeito in September 2020.

In September 2024, Ishii became Chief Representative of Komeito, succeeding the long-serving Natsuo Yamaguchi. Ishii was a candidate from the Saitama 14th district in the election held the following month. The election was a setback for the ruling coalition, which lost its majority in the house, and Ishii was unexpectedly defeated despite being an incumbent party leader. Due to this, Ishii announced his intention to resign. He was succeeded by Tetsuo Saito on 9 November 2024.

Ahead of the February 2026 general election, the Komeito and the Constitutional Democratic Party merged their lower house groups to form the Centrist Reform Alliance. Ishii was elected as a candidate in the Northern Kanto proportional representation block. When the Diet convened, he was elected Vice Speaker of the House of Representatives, having been nominated by the CRA.

House of Representatives (Japan)
Preceded by Kōichirō Genba	Vice Speaker of the House of Representatives; 2026–present	Incumbent
Political offices
Preceded by Akihiro Ota	Minister of Land, Infrastructure, Transport and Tourism; 2015–2019	Succeeded by Kazuyoshi Akaba
Party political offices
Preceded by Tetsuo Saito	Chairman of the Policy Research Council, Komeito; 2010–2015	Succeeded by Noritoshi Ishida
Preceded by Tetsuo Saito	Secretary General of the Komeito; 2020–2024	Succeeded by Makoto Nishida
Preceded by Natsuo Yamaguchi	Chief Representative of Komeito; 2024	Succeeded by Tetsuo Saito
