= Miyazaki 1st district =

Legislative district of Japan

- Parliamentary constituency for the Japanese House of Representatives
- Numbered map of Miyazaki Prefecture single-member districts
- Prefecture: Miyazaki
- Proportional District: Kyushu
- Electorate: 352,630

Current constituency
- Created: 1994
- Seats: One
- Party: CRA
- Representative: Sō Watanabe
- Municipalities: Miyazaki City and Higashimorokata District

Miyazaki 1st district (宮崎県第1区, Miyazaki-ken dai-ikku or simply 宮崎1区, Miyazaki-ikku ) is a single-member constituency of the House of Representatives in the national Diet of Japan located in Miyazaki Prefecture.

== Areas covered ==
=== Since 2013 ===
- Miyazaki City
- Higashimorokata District

=== 1994–2013 ===
- Miyazaki City
- Higashimorokata District
- Miyazaki District

== List of representatives ==
| Election | Representative | Party | Notes |
|---|---|---|---|
| 1996 | Nariaki Nakayama | Liberal Democratic | |
| 2000 | Nariaki Nakayama | Liberal Democratic | |
| 2003 | Nariaki Nakayama | Liberal Democratic | |
| 2005 | Nariaki Nakayama | Liberal Democratic | |
| 2005 | Nariaki Nakayama | Independent | |
| 2009 | Hidesaburo Kawamura | Independent | |
| 2009 | Hidesaburo Kawamura | Democratic | |
| 2012 | Shunsuke Takei | Liberal Democratic | |
| 2014 | Shunsuke Takei | Liberal Democratic | |
| 2017 | Shunsuke Takei | Liberal Democratic | |
| 2021 | Sō Watanabe | CDP | |
| 2024 | Sō Watanabe | CDP | |
| 2026 | Sō Watanabe | CRA | |

== Election results ==
2026
| Party | Candidate | Votes | % | ±% |
|---|---|---|---|---|
| Centrist Reform | Sō Watanabe | 72,280 | 40.28 | ▼6.3 |
| LDP | Shunsuke Takei (elected in Kyushu PR block) | 58,167 | 32.42 | ▲3.5 |
| Ishin | Tomohiro Yokota | 28,831 | 16.07 | ▲1.6 |
| Sanseitō | Kuniaki Shigei | 20,153 | 11.23 | ▲1.23 |
| Registered electors | | 346,846 | | |
| Turnout | | | 52.58 | ▲2.59 |
| Centrist Reform hold | | | | |

2024
| Party | Candidate | Votes | % | ±% |
|---|---|---|---|---|
| CDP | Sō Watanabe | 79,605 | 46.6 | ▲14.4 |
| LDP | Shunsuke Takei | 49,310 | 28.9 | ▼3.1 |
| Ishin | Itsuki Toyama | 24,846 | 14.5 | ▲2.5 |
| Sanseitō | Yuka Shigei | 17,100 | 10.0 | |
| Registered electors | | 349,621 | | |
| Turnout | | | 49.99 | ▼3.30 |
| CDP hold | | | | |

2021
| Party | Candidate | Votes | % | ±% |
|---|---|---|---|---|
| ' CDP (endorsed by SDP)' | Sō Watanabe | 60,719 | 32.60 | New |
| Liberal Democratic (endorsed by Komeito) | Shunsuke Takei (incumbent) (won PR seat) | 59,649 | 32.02 | |
| Independent | Noriko Wakitani | 43,555 | 23.38 | New |
| Innovation | Itsuki Toyama | 22,350 | 12.00 | New |
| Majority | | 1,070 | 0.58 | |
| Registered electors | | 354,691 | | |
| Turnout | | | 53.29 | ▲3.85 |
| CDP gain from LDP | | | | |

2017
| Party | Candidate | Votes | % | ±% |
|---|---|---|---|---|
| Liberal Democratic (endorsed by Komeito) | Shunsuke Takei (incumbent) | 94,780 | 55.18 | |
| Kibō no Tō | Itsuki Toyama | 57,047 | 33.21 | New |
| Communist | Shizuo Uchida | 19,937 | 11.61 | |
| Majority | | 37,733 | 21.97 | |
| Registered electors | | 356,152 | | |
| Turnout | | | 49.44 | ▲1.11 |
| LDP hold | | | | |

2014
| Party | Candidate | Votes | % | ±% |
|---|---|---|---|---|
| Liberal Democratic (endorsed by Komeito) | Shunsuke Takei (incumbent) | 89,171 | 54.19 | |
| Innovation | Itsuki Toyama | 39,394 | 23.94 | New |
| Democratic | Hidetoshi Murao | 23,127 | 14.05 | |
| Communist | Takashi Matsumoto | 12,871 | 7.82 | |
| Majority | | 49,777 | 30.25 | |
| Registered electors | | 349,006 | | |
| Turnout | | | 48.33 | |
| LDP hold | | | | |

2012
| Party | Candidate | Votes | % | ±% |
|---|---|---|---|---|
| Liberal Democratic | Shunsuke Takei | 78,392 | 41.36 | N/A |
| Democratic (endorsed by PNP) | Hidesaburo Kawamura (Incumbent) | 42,748 | 22.56 | N/A |
| Restoration | Nariaki Nakayama (won PR seat) | 37,198 | 19.63 | New |
| Tomorrow (endorsed by Daichi) | Itsuki Toyama | 15,300 | 8.07 | New |
| Social Democratic | Hidetoshi Matsumura | 8,414 | 4.44 | N/A |
| Communist | Takashi Matsumoto | 7,475 | 3.94 | |
| Majority | | 35,644 | 18.80 | |
| Turnout | | | | |
| LDP gain from Democratic | | | | |

2009
| Party | Candidate | Votes | % | ±% |
|---|---|---|---|---|
| Independent (endorsed by DPJ, SDP) | Hidesaburo Kawamura | 109,411 | 48.30 | New |
| Independent | Nariaki Nakayama (Incumbent) | 55,114 | 24.33 | New |
| Independent | Mitsuhiro Uesugi | 47,116 | 20.80 | New |
| Communist | Hiromitsu Baba | 11,143 | 4.92 | |
| Happiness Realization | Chika Tsurumaru | 3,726 | 1.64 | New |
| Majority | | 54,297 | 23.97 | |
| Turnout | | | | |
| Independent gain from Independent | | | | |

2005
| Party | Candidate | Votes | % | ±% |
|---|---|---|---|---|
| Liberal Democratic | Nariaki Nakayama (incumbent) | 121,355 | 56.90 | |
| Democratic | Takashi Yonezawa (PR seat incumbent) | 56,890 | 26.67 | |
| Social Democratic | Kenji Ukai | 26,297 | 12.33 | N/A |
| Communist | Emi Maeyashiki | 8,735 | 4.10 | |
| Majority | | 64,465 | 30.23 | |
| Turnout | | | | |
| LDP hold | | | | |

2003
| Party | Candidate | Votes | % | ±% |
|---|---|---|---|---|
| Liberal Democratic | Nariaki Nakayama (incumbent) | 99,969 | 52.71 | |
| Democratic | Takashi Yonezawa (PR seat incumbent) (won PR seat) | 71,616 | 37.76 | |
| Independent | Masakatsu Kojo | 9,196 | 4.85 | New |
| Communist | Akio Noda | 8,865 | 4.67 | |
| Majority | | 28,353 | 14.95 | |
| Turnout | | | | |
| LDP hold | | | | |

2000
| Party | Candidate | Votes | % | ±% |
|---|---|---|---|---|
| Liberal Democratic | Nariaki Nakayama (incumbent) | 91,472 | 42.92 | |
| Democratic | Takashi Yonezawa | 75,761 | 35.55 | New |
| Social Democratic | Ryoji Toyama | 24,791 | 11.63 | |
| Independent | Koki Kawagoe | 13,108 | 6.15 | New |
| Communist | Akio Noda | 7,974 | 3.74 | |
| Majority | | 15,711 | 7.37 | |
| Turnout | | | | |
| LDP hold | | | | |

- Yonezawa was additionally elected by Kyushu proportional representation block following Issei Koga's resignation (running in a by-election).

1996
| Party | Candidate | Votes | % | ±% |
|---|---|---|---|---|
| Liberal Democratic | Nariaki Nakayama | 78,145 | 41.14 | New |
| New Frontier | Takashi Yonezawa | 75,152 | 39.56 | New |
| Social Democratic | Toshihisa Matsuura | 23,730 | 12.49 | New |
| Communist | Chika Nagatomo | 12,025 | 6.33 | New |
| Liberal League | Kenichi Shiiba | 913 | 0.48 | New |
| Majority | | 2,993 | 1.58 | |
| Turnout | | | | |
| LDP win (new seat) | | | | |
