= Hyōgo 2nd district =

Legislative district of Japan

Hyogo 2nd district (兵庫県第2区, Hyōgo-ken Dai-niku), also referred to as Hyōgo ni-ku (兵庫2区), is a constituency of the House of Representatives in the Diet of Japan located in southwestern Hyogo Prefecture. The district consists of the Hyōgo, Kita and Nagata wards of Kobe and, after redistricting in 2017, a part of Nishinomiya (the former villages of Yamaguchi and Shiose). As of September 2015, 357,643 eligible voters were registered in the district. It is one of the 48 districts in the Kansai region that form the Kinki proportional representation block.

The district was established as part of the electoral reform of 1994; the area was previously part of Hyōgo 1st district, which covered the whole of Kobe and elected five representatives by single non-transferable vote.

From the district's creation until 2026, the seat was held by Kazuyoshi Akaba of the Komeito party, except for the DPJ landslide 2009 election when Koichi Mukoyama won the seat. Akaba subsequently defeated Mukoyama in the December 2012 election.

== List of representatives ==
Representative	Party	Dates	Notes
Kazuyoshi Akaba	New Frontier(1996–98)	1996 – 2009	Senior Vice-Minister of Finance (November 2005 – September 2006)
Kazuyoshi Akaba	Komeito(1998-2009)	1996 – 2009	Senior Vice-Minister of Finance (November 2005 – September 2006)
Koichi Mukoyama	Democratic	2009 – 2012	
Kazuyoshi Akaba	Komeito	2012 – 2026	Senior Vice-Minister of Economy, Trade and Industry and Cabinet Senior Vice-Minister (December 2012 – September 2014)
Keishi Abe	Ishin	2026 –	

== Election results ==
2026
Party	Candidate	Votes	%	±%
Ishin	Keishi Abe	82,982	45.0	▲19.4
Centrist Reform	Jirō Funakawa	46,308	25.1	▲4.0
Independent	Yasunaga Bō (Endorsed by Hyōgo branch of LDP)	41,929	22.7	
JCP	Hiroko Imura	13,141	7.1	▼1.6
Registered electors		375,717		
Turnout			50.66	▼0.32
Ishin gain from Komeito				

2024
Party	Candidate	Votes	%	±%
Komeito	Kazuyoshi Akaba (endorsed by the LDP)	70,018	37.27	▼16.94
Ishin	Keishi Abe (elected via PR)	48,289	25.63	New
CDP	Jirō Funakawa	39,785	21.12	▼12.61
JCP	Yumiko Takeuchi	16,333	8.67	▼3.39
Sanseitō	Eiji Seo	13,954	7.41	New
Turnout		188,379	50.98	▲0.01

2021
Party	Candidate	Votes	%	±%
Komeito	Kazuyoshi Akaba	99,455	54.2	▲1.7
CDP	Jirō Funakawa	61,884	33.7	
JCP	Tsuruo Miyano	22,124	12.1	▼11.1
Turnout			50.97	▲4.99
Komeito hold				

2017
Party	Candidate	Votes	%	±%
Komeito	Kazuyoshi Akaba	89,349	52.5	▲3.2
Independent	Jirō Funakawa	41,238	24.2	
JCP	Junko Hiramatsu	39,502	23.2	▲3.3
Turnout			45.98	▼2.03
Komeito hold				

2014
Party	Candidate	Votes	%	±%
Komeito	Kazuyoshi Akaba	78,131	49.3	▲2.0
Democratic	Koichi Mukoyama	48,796	30.8	▲7.2
JCP	Junko Hiramatsu	31,575	19.9	▲7.3
Turnout			48.01	▼7.15
Komeito hold				

2012
Party	Candidate	Votes	%	±%
Komeito	Kazuyoshi Akaba	87,969	47.3	
Democratic	Koichi Mukoyama	43,900	23.6	
Independent	Daisuke Gotō	30,658	16.5	
JCP	Yūna Nukina	23,367	12.6	
Turnout				

2009
Party	Candidate	Votes	%	±%
Democratic	Koichi Mukoyama	11,208	48.9	11.1
Komeito	Kazuyoshi Akaba	88,502	38.9	−9.2
JCP	Hiroko Imura	23,041	10.1	−4.0
Happiness Realization	Tomohiro Takeuchi	4,485	2.0	2.0
Turnout				

2005
Party	Candidate	Votes	%	±%
Komeito	Kazuyoshi Akaba	106,056	48.1	
Democratic	Fusaho Izumi	83,380	37.8	
JCP	Junko Hiramatsu	31,155	14.1	
Turnout				

== See also ==
- Hyogo at-large district, Hyogo Prefecture's district for the House of Councillors
