= Mitsubishi Research Institute DCS =

Japanese system integrator

- Company type: Incorporated
- Industry: System integration
- Founded: 1970
- Headquarters: 12-1, Higashi-Shinagawa 4-chome, Shinagawa, Tokyo 140-8506, Japan
- Key people: Hiroki Kameda (President and CEO)
- Revenue: 49,000,000,000 yen (Half-year ending in September, 2007)
- Number of employees: about 1800
- Website: Mitsubishi Research Institute DCS

Mitsubishi Research Institute DCS (三菱総研DCS), often simply called DCS, for Diamond Computer Service, its former name, is the system integrator of Mitsubishi UFJ Financial Group (MUFG), jointly owned by Mitsubishi Research Institute, Inc. (MRI) (60 percent) and MUFG (40 percent). It was established in 1970 from the IT service department of Mitsubishi Bank, listed in the First Floor of Tokyo Stock Exchange in 2001, but was delisted in 2004. It now employs about 1800 people.

DCS has several subsidiaries.

DC Operations (DCO) (1975)
Tohoku Diamond Computer Service (1993)
Diamond Fuji Soft (D&F) (1999)
with Fuji Soft (50%)
D&F will be separated to Idea Consulting (held by Fuji Soft) and MRV Solutions (held by DCS) on June 1st, 2010.
Nippon Card Processing (NICAP) (2001)
with NTT Data, First Data and Mitsubishi UFJ Nicos (formerly DC Card)
MRI Value Consulting (MRV) (2009)
with MRI (36%) and Mitsubishi Electric Information Systems (MDIS) (34%)
UBS Corporation (established in 1999, owned by DCS since 2010)
with Uni Charm (20%)
