= Kazuo Kitagawa =

Japanese politician

- 北側一雄
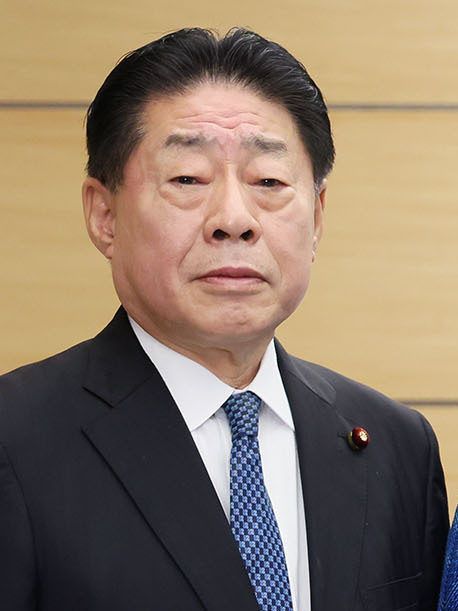
- Kitagawa in 2022

Minister of Land, Infrastructure, Transport and Tourism
- In office 27 September 2004 – 26 September 2006
- Prime Minister: Junichiro Koizumi
- Preceded by: Nobuteru Ishihara
- Succeeded by: Tetsuzo Fuyushiba

Member of the House of Representatives
- In office 17 December 2012 – 9 October 2024
- Preceded by: Hiroyuki Moriyama
- Succeeded by: Masaki Kuroda
- Constituency: Osaka 16th
- In office 19 February 1990 – 21 July 2009
- Preceded by: Yoshiaki Masaki
- Succeeded by: Hiroyuki Moriyama
- Constituency: Osaka 5th (1990–1996); Osaka 16th (1996–2009)

Personal details
- Born: 2 March 1953 (age 73) Ikuno, Osaka, Japan
- Party: Komeito
- Other political affiliations: CGP (1990–1994); NFP (1994–1998)
- Parent: Yoshikazu Kitagawa (father)
- Education: Sōka University

Kazuo Kitagawa (北側 一雄, Kitagawa Kazuo; born 2 March 1953) is a retired Japanese politician who served as the Minister of Land, Infrastructure and Transport in the cabinet of Junichiro Koizumi.

== Biography ==
Born in Ikuno-ku, Osaka, Kitagawa graduated from Faculty of Law at Sōka University and became a lawyer. In 1990, he was elected to the House of Representatives for the first time and was appointed as the Minister of Land, Infrastructure and Transport in 2004.

He was the secretary general of Komeito when the party suffered a major defeat in the 2009 Japanese general election. Komeito lost ten seats, including Kitagawa's and that of party leader Akihiro Ota. On 8 September 2009 Yoshihisa Inoue replaced Kitagawa as secretary general of Komeito. Notwithstanding the loss of his seat, Kitagawa became deputy president of the party.

Kitagawa regained his seat representing the Osaka 16th district (representing Sakai-ku, Higashi-ku and Kita-ku in Sakai City) in the 2012 general election, and held the seat in the 2014 general election. On 9 October 2024, he announced his retirement from politics and would not run in the 2024 general election.

Political offices
Preceded by Nobuteru Ishihara	Minister of Land, Infrastructure, Transport and Tourism; 2004–2006	Succeeded by Tetsuzo Fuyushiba
Party political offices
Preceded by Chikara Sakaguchi	Chairman of the Policy Research Council, Kōmeitō; 1999–2004	Succeeded by Yoshihisa Inoue
Preceded by Tetsuzo Fuyushiba	Secretary General of Kōmeitō; 2006–2009	Succeeded by Yoshihisa Inoue
Preceded by Yoshio Urushibara	Chairman of the Central Executive Committee, Kōmeitō; 2017–2024	Succeeded by Shigeki Sato
