= Jiro Hata =

Japanese politician (born 1969)

- 羽田 次郎
- Hata in 2025

Member of the House of Councillors
- Incumbent
- Assumed office 28 April 2021
- Preceded by: Yuichiro Hata
- Constituency: Nagano at-large

Personal details
- Born: 7 September 1969 (age 56) Chiyoda, Tokyo, Japan
- Party: Constitutional Democratic (since 2021)
- Other political affiliations: Democratic (2011–2016); Independent (2016–2017; 2018–2021); KnT (2017–2018)
- Relations: Yuichiro Hata (brother)
- Parents: Tsutomu Hata (father); Ayako Hata (mother)
- Education: Lycée Seijo
- Alma mater: Wake Forest University

Jiro Hata is a Japanese politician who is a member of the House of Councillors of Japan.

== Biography ==
He was born in Tokyo and attended Wake Forest University.

On December 27, 2020, his brother Yuichiro Hata, a member of the House of Councilors, died of coronovarius. He decided to run in a by-election in April 2021, defeating Yutaka Komatsu, a former member of the House of Representatives of Japan. He was re-elected in 2022.
