= Hiromi Yoshida =

Japanese politician (1949–2019)

- 吉田 博美
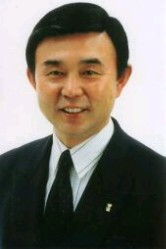
- Official portrait, 2005

Member of the House of Councillors
- In office 29 July 2001 – 28 July 2019
- Preceded by: Mineo Koyama
- Succeeded by: Seat abolished
- Constituency: Nagano at-large

Speaker of the Nagano Prefectural Assembly
- In office March 2000 – March 2001

Member of the Nagano Prefectural Assembly
- In office 1983–2001
- Constituency: Shimoina District

Personal details
- Born: 17 June 1949 Yanai, Yamaguchi, Japan
- Died: 26 October 2019 (aged 70) Tokyo, Japan
- Party: Liberal Democratic
- Education: Waseda University

Hiromi Yoshida (吉田 博美, Yoshida Hiromi; 17 June 1949 – 26 October 2019) was a Japanese politician of the Liberal Democratic Party, a member of the House of Councillors in the Diet (national legislature). A graduate of Waseda University, he was elected to the House of Councillors for the first time in 2001 after serving in the assembly of Nagano Prefecture for five terms since 1983.

House of Councillors
Preceded by Mineo Koyama; Yūichirō Hata	Councillor for Nagano (class of 1947/1953/...); 2001–2019; Served alongside: Yūichirō Hata	Succeeded by Yūichirō Hata
Party political offices
Preceded by Chūichi Date	Chairman of the Diet Affairs Committee for the Liberal Democratic Party in the House of Councillors; 2014—2016	Succeeded by Masaji Matsuyama
Preceded by Chūichi Date	Secretary-General for the Liberal Democratic Party in the House of Councillors; 2016—2019	Succeeded by Hiroshige Sekō
