= Tetsuo Saito =

Japanese politician (born 1952)

- 斉藤 鉄夫
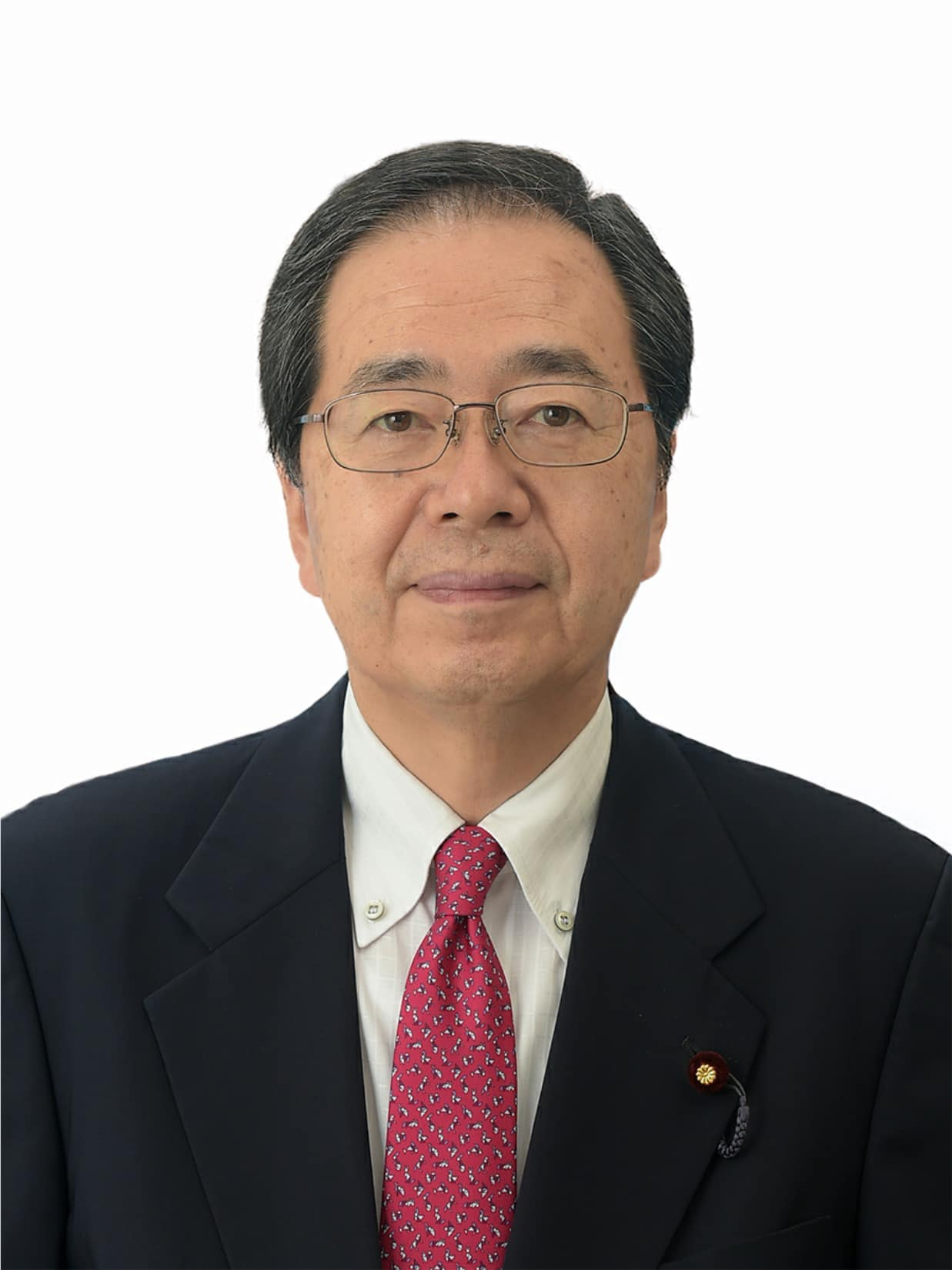
- Official portrait, 2021

Co-president of the Centrist Reform Alliance
- In office 22 January 2026 – 13 February 2026 Serving with Yoshihiko Noda
- Preceded by: Office established
- Succeeded by: Junya Ogawa

Chief Representative of Komeito
- In office 9 November 2024 – 21 January 2026
- Preceded by: Keiichi Ishii
- Succeeded by: Toshiko Takeya
Ministerial offices
Minister of Land, Infrastructure, Transport and Tourism
In office 4 October 2021 – 11 November 2024
Prime Minister	Fumio Kishida; Shigeru Ishiba
Preceded by	Kazuyoshi Akaba
Succeeded by	Hiromasa Nakano
Minister of the Environment
In office 2 August 2008 – 16 September 2009
Prime Minister	Yasuo Fukuda; Tarō Asō
Preceded by	Ichirō Kamoshita
Succeeded by	Sakihito Ozawa

Member of the House of Representatives
- Incumbent
- Assumed office 19 July 1993
- Preceded by: Seat established
- Constituency: Hiroshima 1st (1993–1996); Chugoku PR (1996–2021); Hiroshima 3rd (2021–2026); Chugoku PR (2026–present)

Personal details
- Born: 5 February 1952 (age 74) Ōnan, Shimane, Japan
- Party: Komeito (1998–2026; since 2026)
- Other political affiliations: CGP (1993–1994); NFP (1994–1998); CRA (2026)
- Education: Tokyo Institute of Technology

Tetsuo Saito (斉藤 鉄夫, Saitō Tetsuo; born 5 February 1952) is a Japanese politician who served as chief representative of the Komeito from 2024 to 2026. He served as Minister of Land, Infrastructure, Transport and Tourism from 2021 to 2024 and Minister of the Environment from 2008 to 2009.

Born in Shimane Prefecture, he was educated at the Tokyo Institute of Technology and worked as an engineer before entering politics. He was elected to serve as chief representative of the Komeito to succeed Keiichi Ishii, who was defeated in the 2024 election.

== Career ==
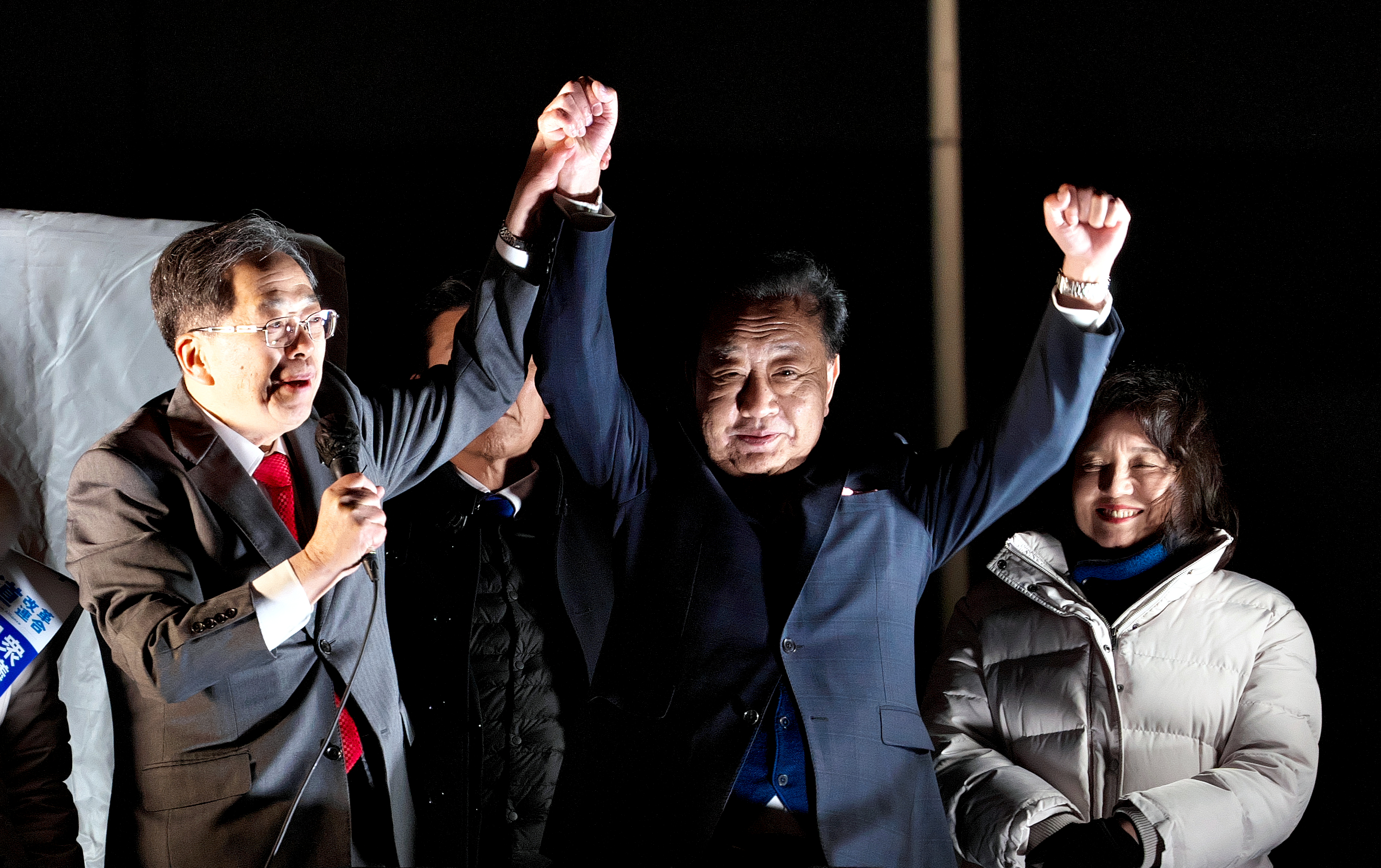
Saito gave a street speech for the general election with Yoshihiko Noda and Toshiko Takeya (7 February 2026)

Tetsuo Saito was born on 5 February 1952, in Ōchi District, Shimane. His father was a village councilman belonging to the Liberal Democratic Party and the head of a local group supporting Noboru Takeshita.

Saito attended the Tokyo Institute of Technology as an undergraduate studying applied physics, graduating in 1976, and received a Ph.D. in engineering from the same school. His first employment was with the major construction firm Shimizu Corporation. Saito was a visiting researcher at Princeton University for three years beginning in 1986. He was elected to the Diet for the first time in 1993.

Saito is known for his ties with NASA as well as expert knowledge of lunar bases and clean energy technology. Due to his knowledge in these areas, he was appointed parliamentary secretary of science and technology in 1999 in the Keizo Obuchi administration.

Saito was appointed Minister of the Environment by Prime Minister Yasuo Fukuda on 1 August 2008. In the Cabinet of Prime Minister Tarō Asō, appointed on 24 September 2008, Saito was retained in his post.

On 9 November 2024, Saito was selected as leader of Komeito following an extraordinary party convention to replace Keiichi Ishii, who lost his parliamentary seat in the 2024 Japanese general election.

On 10 October 2025, Saito announced that it would leave the ruling coalition, over disagreements with new LDP president Sanae Takaichi.

On 15 January 2026, Yoshihiko Noda and Saito announced that the Constitutional Democratic Party and Komeito would merge in the lower-house to form a new centrist party named the Centrist Reform Alliance. In the 2026 general election, the CRA collapsed to just 49 seats; following the election, Noda and Saito resigned as party co-presidents.

After the Diet convened, Saito was made chairman of the Committee on Discipline in the House of Representatives.

== Personal life ==
His main hobbies are swimming and trains.

House of Representatives (Japan)
Preceded by Yoshio Tezuka	Chairman of the Committee on Discipline; 2026–present	Incumbent
Political offices
Preceded by Ichirō Kamoshita	Minister of the Environment; 2008–2009	Succeeded by Sakihito Ozawa
Preceded by Kazuyoshi Akaba	Minister of Land, Infrastructure, Transport and Tourism; 2021–2024	Succeeded by Hiromasa Nakano
Party political offices
Preceded by Yoshihisa Inoue; Natsuo Yamaguchi	Chairman of the Policy Research Council, Komeito; 2006–2008; 2009–2010	Succeeded by Natsuo Yamaguchi; Keiichi Ishii
Preceded by Yoshihisa Inoue	Secretary General of the Komeito; 2018–2020	Succeeded by Keiichi Ishii
Preceded by Keiichi Ishii	Chief Representative of Komeito; 2024–2026	Succeeded by Toshiko Takeya
Preceded by Office established	Co-president of the Centrist Reform Alliance; 2026–2026	Succeeded by Junya Ogawa
