= Yuichiro Hata =

Japanese politician (1967–2020)

- 羽田 雄一郎
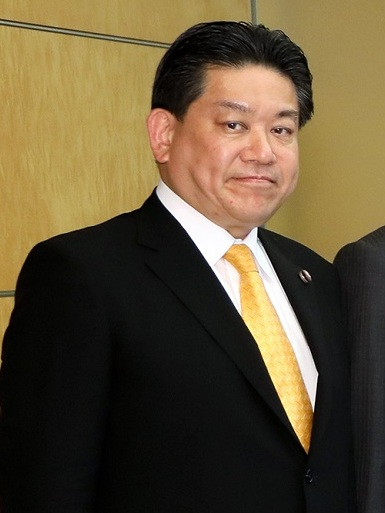
- Hata in 2019

Minister of Land, Infrastructure, Transport and Tourism
- In office 4 June 2012 – 26 December 2012
- Prime Minister: Yoshihiko Noda
- Preceded by: Takeshi Maeda
- Succeeded by: Akihiro Ota

Minister of State for Ocean Policy
- In office 4 June 2012 – 1 October 2012
- Prime Minister: Yoshihiko Noda
- Preceded by: Takeshi Maeda
- Succeeded by: Seiji Maehara

Member of the House of Councillors
- In office 3 January 1999 – 27 December 2020
- Preceded by: Maki Murasawa
- Succeeded by: Jiro Hata
- Constituency: Nagano at-large

Personal details
- Born: 羽田 雄一郎 (Hata Yūichirō); 29 July 1967 Tokyo, Japan
- Died: 27 December 2020 (aged 53) Tokyo, Japan
- Party: CDP (2020)
- Other political affiliations: DPJ (before 2016); DP (2016–2018); DPP (2018–2020)
- Relations: Jiro Hata (brother)
- Parents: Tsutomu Hata (father); Ayako Hata (mother)
- Education: Tamagawa University
- Website: http://www.y-hata.jp/

Yuichiro Hata (羽田 雄一郎, Hata Yūichirō; 29 July 1967 – 27 December 2020) was a Japanese politician of the Constitutional Democratic Party of Japan and a member of the House of Councillors in the Diet of Japan.

A native of Setagaya, Tokyo, and graduate of Tamagawa University, he was elected to the House of Councillors for the first time in 1999, a position he retained until his death in 2020. Hata was the Minister of Land, Infrastructure, Transport and Tourism from 4 June 2012 to 26 December 2012.

He was the son of the late Prime Minister Tsutomu Hata.

== Career ==
Hata was a member of the Itochu Foundation during his time as a student at Tamagawa University. He graduated from the university with a Bachelor of Arts in March 1993. Early in his career Hata was a secretary to his father, Prime Minister Tsutomu Hata, during the latter's tenure in the House of Representatives.

Hata served as member of the House of Councillors in the Diet beginning with his election in 1999. He was affiliated with the Democratic Party of Japan (DPJ), the Democratic Party for the People (DPP) after the merger of the Democratic Party and Kibō no Tō, and finally Constitutional Democratic Party of Japan (CDP) after the DPP's dissolution. On 4 June 2012 Hata was appointed to be the Minister of Land, Infrastructure, Transport and Tourism by Prime Minister Yoshihiko Noda. Following the loss of the Democratic Party of Japan to the Liberal Democratic Party in the 2012 Japanese general election, Noda and his Cabinet, including Hata, were succeeded by Shinzo Abe and his Cabinet on 26 December 2012. In all, he served as a legislator for five terms and was the initial Secretary-General of the Upper House caucus of the CDP at the time of his death in December 2020.

=== Visits to Yasukuni shrine ===
On 15 August 2012, Hata, along with National Safety Commissioner Jin Matsubara became the first cabinet ministers of the DPJ to openly visit the controversial Yasukuni Shrine since the party came to power in 2009. They made their visits to commemorate the 67th anniversary of the end of World War II despite requests from South Korea to refrain from doing so, and despite Prime Minister Yoshihiko Noda requesting his cabinet not to do so.

== Political positions ==
Generally, Hata was part of Japan's center-left political parties. He was a member of the DPJ and later, the CDP, both of which are center-left parties. He held positions consistent with the platform of those parties. He was opposed to the revision of Article 9 of the Japanese Constitution that prohibits Japan from going to war. After the Fukushima Daiichi nuclear disaster, he became critical of Japan's use of nuclear power, stating that the country should aim to get rid of its plants eventually and that the country should not support nuclear projects in other countries. Hata was a supporter of agricultural protectionism in regards to fair trade agreements such as the Trans-Pacific Partnership.

== Death ==
Yuichiro Hata died from COVID-19 in Tokyo on 27 December 2020, at age 53, during the COVID-19 pandemic in Japan while being transported to the University of Tokyo Hospital. He was the first Japanese legislator to die of the disease.

== See also ==
- Noda Cabinet

Political offices
| Preceded by Takeshi Maeda | Minister of Land, Infrastructure, Transport and Tourism; 2012 | Succeeded by Akihiro Ota |
House of Councillors
| Preceded by Mineo Koyama; Maki Murasawa | Councillor for Nagano (class of 1947/1953/...); 1999–2020; Served alongside: Mineo Koyama, Hiromi Yoshida | Vacant |
