= Takeshi Maeda =

Japanese politician (born 1937)

- 前田 武志
- Maeda in 2011

Minister of Land, Infrastructure, Transport and Tourism
- In office 2 September 2011 – 4 June 2012
- Prime Minister: Yoshihiko Noda
- Preceded by: Akihiro Ohata
- Succeeded by: Yuichiro Hata

Member of the House of Councillors
- In office 26 July 2004 – 25 July 2016
- Constituency: National PR

Member of the House of Representatives
- In office 6 July 1986 – 2 June 2000
- Preceded by: Chūzaburō Kagita
- Succeeded by: Ryotaro Tanose
- Constituency: Nara at-large (1986–1996); Nara 4th (1996–2000)

Personal details
- Born: 22 October 1937 (age 89) Yoshino, Nara, Japan
- Party: DPP (since 2018)
- Other political affiliations: LDP (1983–1993); JRP (1993–1994); NFP (1994–1996); Sun (1996–1998); GGP (1998); DPJ (1998–2016); DP (2016–2018)
- Education: Kyoto University

Takeshi Maeda (前田 武志, Maeda Takeshi; born 22 October 1937) is a retired Japanese politician of the Democratic Party of Japan, who served as a member of the House of Representatives and the House of Councillors in the Diet (national legislature).

== Early life ==
A native of Yoshino District, Nara, Maeda graduated from Kyoto University with a master's degree.

== Political career ==
Maeda was first elected to the House of Representatives in 1986, representing the Nara at-large constituency. After serving in the House of Representatives for four terms, one as representative for the Nara 4th constituency, he was elected to the House of Councillors for the first time in 2004.

In September 2011 he was appointed as Minister of Land, Infrastructure, Transport and Tourism in the cabinet of newly appointed prime minister Yoshihiko Noda. However, Maeda left the ministry the following year after a series of censure motions were passed by the House of Councillors in April 2012. These motions required prime minister Noda to dismiss both Maeda and the Minister of Defence Naoki Tanaka in order to get the necessary support from the opposition parties to pass his plan to increase Japan's consumption tax rate.

Maeda retired from the House of Councillors after his term expired in 2016.
