= Tetsuzo Fuyushiba =

Japanese politician (1936–2011)

- 冬柴鐵三
- Official portrait, 2006

Minister of Land, Infrastructure, Transport and Tourism
- In office 26 September 2006 – 2 August 2008
- Prime Minister: Shinzo Abe; Yasuo Fukuda
- Preceded by: Kazuo Kitagawa
- Succeeded by: Sadakazu Tanigaki

Member of the House of Representatives
- In office 8 July 1986 – 21 July 2009
- Preceded by: Tomio Okamoto
- Succeeded by: Yasuo Tanaka
- Constituency: Hyōgo 2nd (1986–1996); Hyōgo 8th (1996–2009)

Personal details
- Born: 29 June 1936 Shenyang, Manchukuo
- Died: 5 December 2011 (aged 75) Amagasaki, Hyōgo, Japan
- Party: Komeito
- Other political affiliations: CGP (1986–1994); NFP (1994–1998)
- Children: 4
- Education: Kansai University

Tetsuzo Fuyushiba (冬柴 鉄三, Fuyushiba Tetsuzō; 29 June 1936 – 5 December 2011) was a Japanese politician of the New Komeito Party, a member of the House of Representatives in the Diet (national legislature). He served as Minister of Land, Infrastructure and Transport as well as Minister of State for Tourism Promotion in Prime Minister Yasuo Fukuda's Cabinet.

Fuyushiba was born in Shenyang (which was then known as Hōten) in the Japanese-occupied territory of Manchukuo, in what is now northeastern China. He graduated from Kansai University in 1960 before working as a lawyer. He was elected to the House of Representatives for the first time in 1986.

Fuyushiba died on 5 December 2011, aged 75, of acute pneumonia at a hospital in Amagasaki, Hyōgo Prefecture.

Political offices
Preceded by Kazuo Kitagawa	Minister of Land, Infrastructure and Transport of Japan; 2006–2008	Succeeded by Sadakazu Tanigaki
Party political offices
New political party	Secretary General of Kōmeitō; 1998–2006	Succeeded by Kazuo Kitagawa
