= Makoto Nagamine =

Japanese politician

- 長峯 誠
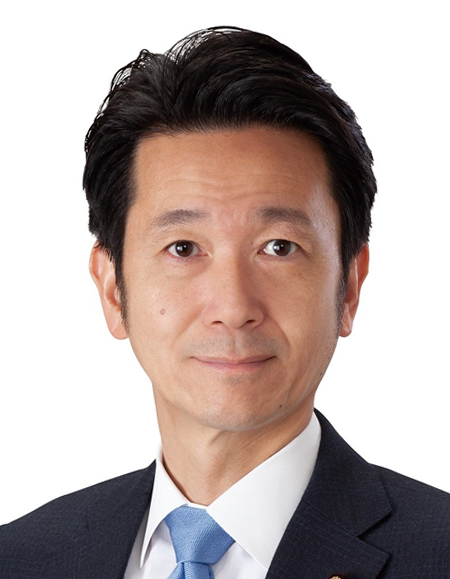
- Official portrait, 2022

Member of the House of Councillors
- In office 29 July 2013 – 28 July 2025
- Preceded by: Itsuki Toyama
- Succeeded by: Kanako Yamauchi
- Constituency: Miyazaki at-large

Mayor of Miyakonojō
- In office December 2004 – 21 November 2012
- Preceded by: Tatsuya Iwahashi
- Succeeded by: Takahisa Ikeda

Member of the Miyazaki Prefectural Assembly
- In office 1997 – September 2004
- Constituency: Miyakonojō City

Personal details
- Born: 2 August 1969 (age 57) Miyakonojō, Miyazaki, Japan
- Party: Liberal Democratic (1997–2006; 2013–present)
- Other political affiliations: Independent (2006–2013)
- Parent: Motoi Nagamine (father)
- Education: Waseda University

Makoto Nagamine is a Japanese politician who served as a member of the House of Councillors of Japan as a member of the Liberal Democratic Party. He was the parliamentary Vice-Minister of Economy, Trade and Industry.
