= Hiromasa Nakano =

Japanese politician (born 1978)

- 中野 洋昌
- Official portrait, 2024

Secretary-General of Centrist Reform Alliance
- In office 22 January 2026 – 18 February 2026 Serving with Jun Azumi
- Leader: Yoshihiko Noda; Tetsuo Saito
- Preceded by: Office established
- Succeeded by: Takeshi Shina

Minister of Land, Infrastructure, Transport and Tourism
- In office 11 November 2024 – 21 October 2025
- Prime Minister: Shigeru Ishiba
- Preceded by: Tetsuo Saito
- Succeeded by: Yasushi Kaneko

Member of the House of Representatives
- Incumbent
- Assumed office 18 December 2012
- Preceded by: Yasuo Tanaka
- Constituency: Hyōgo 8th (2012–2026); Kinki PR (2026–present)

Personal details
- Born: 4 January 1978 (age 48) Kyoto, Japan
- Party: Komeito (2012–2026; since 2026)
- Other political affiliations: CRA (2026)
- Education: University of Tokyo; Columbia University

Hiromasa Nakano (Japanese: 中野洋昌; born 4 January 1978) is a Japanese politician who served as the Minister of Land, Infrastructure, Transport and Tourism from 2024 to 2025. He has been a member of the House of Representatives for Hyōgo 8th district since 2012.
