= Itsuki Toyama =

Japanese politician (born 1976)

- 外山 斎

Member of the House of Councillors
- In office 29 July 2007 – 4 December 2012
- Preceded by: Toshifumi Kosehira
- Succeeded by: Makoto Nagamine
- Constituency: Miyazaki at-large

Personal details
- Born: 23 April 1976 (age 50) Nichinan, Miyazaki, Japan
- Party: Innovation (2016–2017; 2018–present)
- Other political affiliations: DPJ (2005–2007; 2009–2012); Independent (2007–2009; 2013–2014); PLF (2012); TPJ (2012–2013); PLP (2013); JIP (2014–2016); KnT (2017–2018)
- Education: University of Essex

Itsuki Toyama (外山 斎, Toyama Itsuki; born 1976) is a Japanese politician, an independent and member of the House of Councillors in the Diet (national legislature). He was elected to the House of Councillors for the first time in 2007 after running unsuccessfully for the House of Representatives in 2005.
