= Minister of Land, Infrastructure, Transport and Tourism =

Japanese cabinet role

- Emblem of the Government of Japan

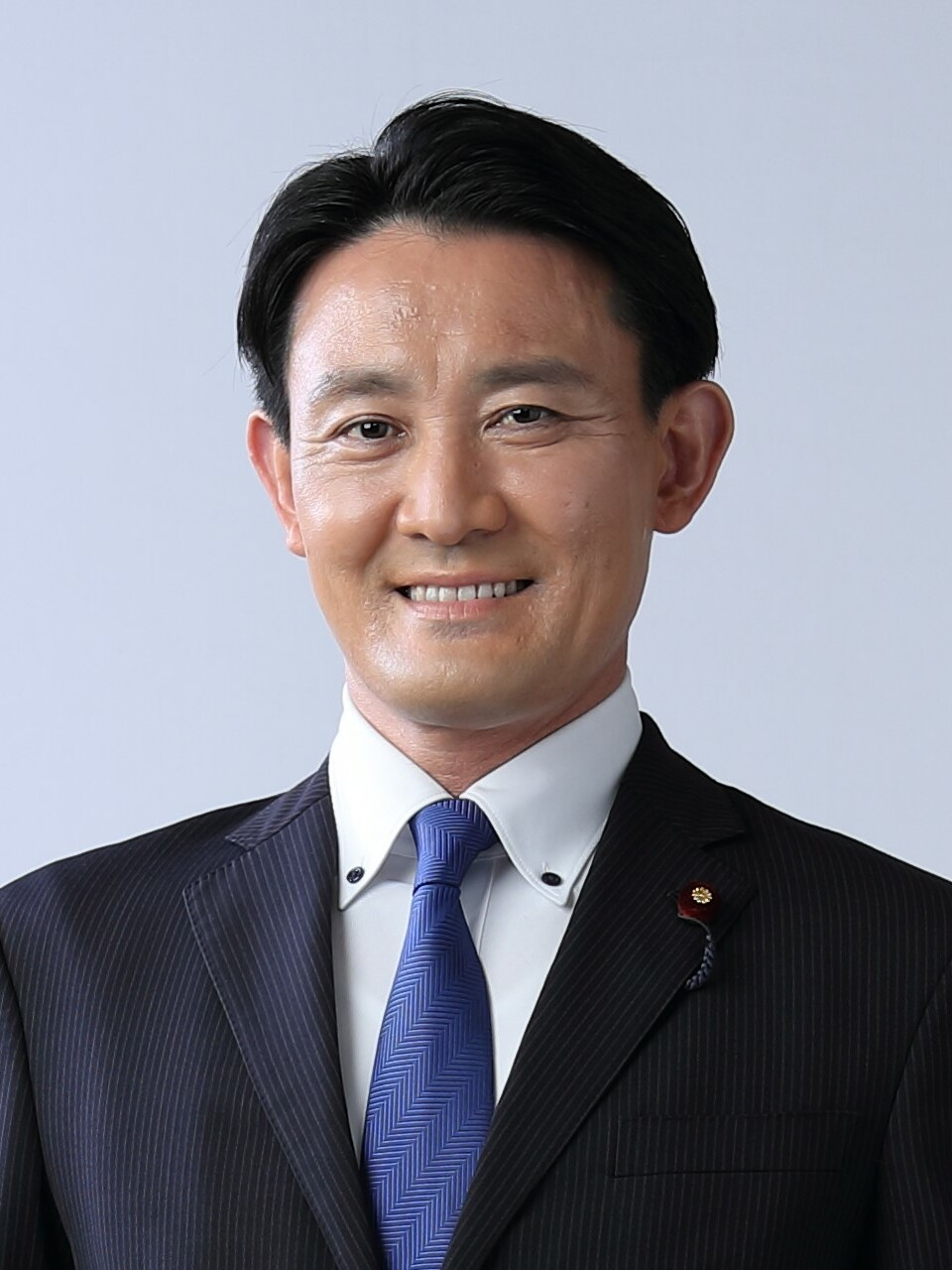
- Incumbent; Tatsunori Ibayashi since September 17, 2026
- Ministry of Land, Infrastructure, Transport and Tourism
- Style: His Excellency
- Member of: Cabinet of Japan; National Security Council; National Intelligence Council
- Reports to: Prime Minister of Japan
- Nominator: Prime Minister of Japan
- Appointer: Emperor of Japan; attested to by the Emperor
- Precursor: Minister of Transport; Minister of Construction; Director-General of the Hokkaido Development Agency; Director-General of the National Land Agency
- Formation: January 6, 2001; 25 years ago
- Deputy: State Minister of Land and Transportation
- Salary: ¥20,916,000

The Minister of Land, Infrastructure, Transport and Tourism (国土交通大臣, Kokudo-Koutsu Daijin) is a member of the Cabinet of Japan and is the leader and chief executive of the Ministry of Land, Infrastructure, Transport and Tourism. The minister is also a statutory member of the National Security Council, and is nominated by the Prime Minister of Japan and is appointed by the Emperor of Japan.

The current minister is Tatsunori Ibayashi, who took office on September 17, 2026.

== List of ministers of land, infrastructure, transport and tourism (2001–) ==
Liberal Democratic
New Conservative
New Komeito/Komeito
Democratic/Minshutō
Rikken-minshutō
Kokumin-minshutō

Minister			Term of office			Prime Minister
#	Portrait	Name	Took office	Left office	Days	Prime Minister
1		Chikage Oogi	January 6, 2001	September 22, 2003	989	Yoshirō Mori
1		Chikage Oogi	January 6, 2001	September 22, 2003	989	Junichiro Koizumi
2		Nobuteru Ishihara	September 22, 2003	September 27, 2004	371	Junichiro Koizumi
3		Kazuo Kitagawa	September 27, 2004	September 26, 2006	729	Junichiro Koizumi
4		Tetsuzo Fuyushiba	September 26, 2006	August 2, 2008	676	Shinzō Abe
4		Tetsuzo Fuyushiba	September 26, 2006	August 2, 2008	676	Yasuo Fukuda
5		Sadakazu Tanigaki	August 2, 2008	September 24, 2008	53	Yasuo Fukuda
6		Nariaki Nakayama	September 24, 2008	September 28, 2008	5	Tarō Asō
7		Kazuyoshi Kaneko	September 29, 2008	September 16, 2009	352	Tarō Asō
8		Seiji Maehara	September 16, 2009	September 17, 2010	366	Yukio Hatoyama
8		Seiji Maehara	September 16, 2009	September 17, 2010	366	Naoto Kan
9		Sumio Mabuchi	September 17, 2010	January 14, 2011	119	Naoto Kan
10		Akihiro Ohata	January 14, 2011	September 2, 2011	231	Naoto Kan
11		Takeshi Maeda	September 2, 2011	June 4, 2012	276	Yoshihiko Noda
12		Yuichiro Hata	June 4, 2012	December 26, 2012	205	Yoshihiko Noda
13		Akihiro Ota	December 26, 2012	October 7, 2015	1015	Shinzō Abe
14		Keiichi Ishii	October 7, 2015	September 11, 2019	1435	Shinzō Abe
15		Kazuyoshi Akaba	September 11, 2019	October 4, 2021	754	Yoshihide Suga
16		Tetsuo Saitō	October 4, 2021	November 11, 2024	1134	Fumio Kishida
16		Tetsuo Saitō	October 4, 2021	November 11, 2024	1134	Shigeru Ishiba
17		Hiromasa Nakano	November 11, 2024	October 21, 2025	344	Shigeru Ishiba
18		Yasushi Kaneko	October 21, 2025	September 17, 2026	331	Sanae Takaichi
19		Tatsunori Ibayashi	September 17, 2026	Incumbent	0	Sanae Takaichi
