= Mitsubishi Research Institute =

Japanese research company

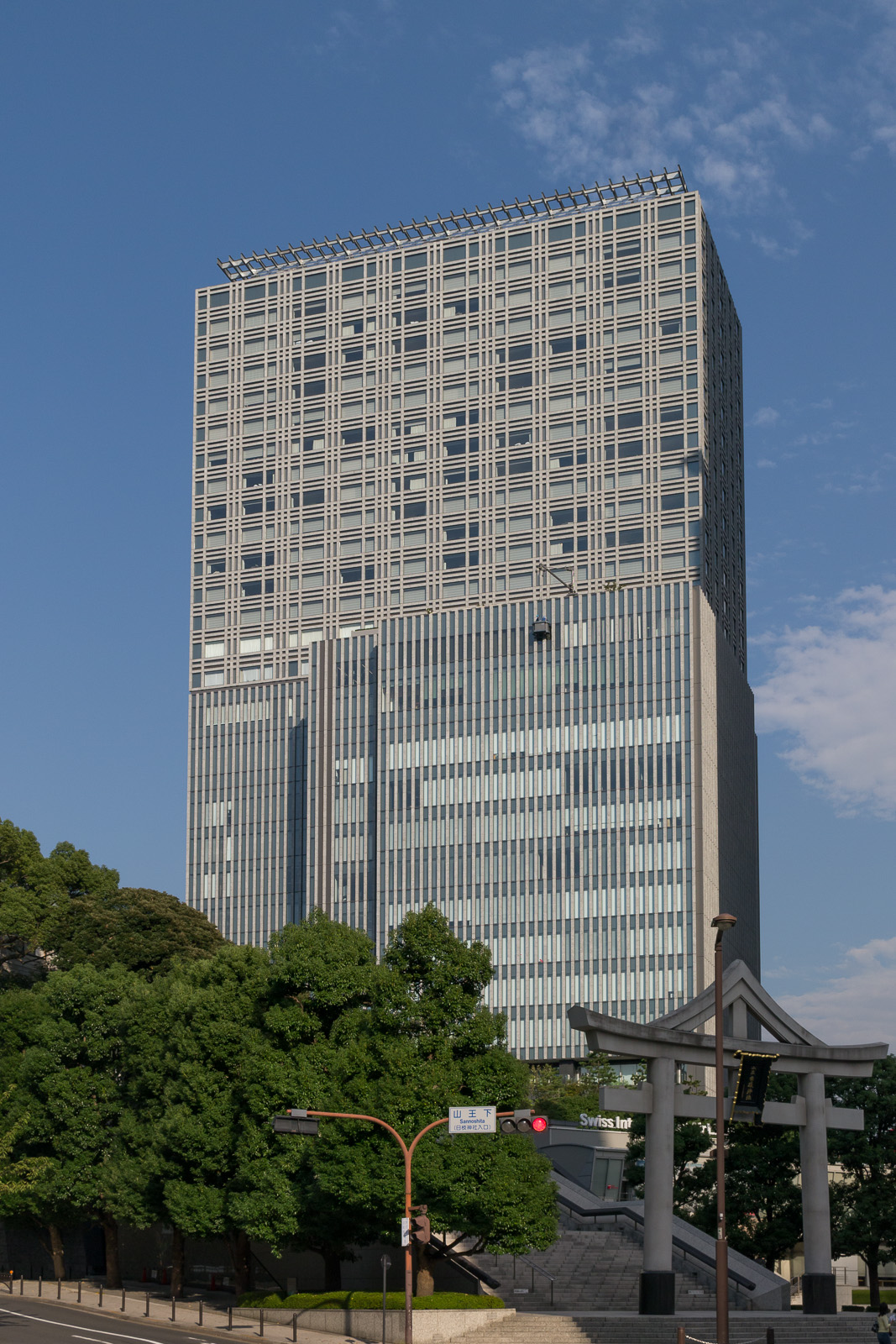
- View of the Tokyu Capitol Tower, Mitsubishi Research Institute, Inc.'s headquarters in Nagatacho, Chiyoda-ku, Tokyo
- Company type: Incorporated
- Industry: Consulting
- Founded: 1970
- Headquarters: 10-3, Nagatacho 2-chome, Chiyoda-ku, Tokyo, Japan, with 4 other offices in Japan & United States
- Key people: Takashi Morisaki (Chairman); Kenji Yabuta (President) num_employees = 3,741 (Consolidated), 896 (Non-consolidated) as of September 30, 2016
- Products: Management consulting reports
- Revenue: 72.5 billion yen (FY2011/9, Consolidated)
- Website: Mitsubishi Research Institute

Mitsubishi Research Institute, Inc. (in Japanese, 三菱総合研究所 or 三菱総研 for short) (TYO: 3636), often called MRI, was established at the centennial anniversary of Japan's Mitsubishi Group in 1970, invested by the various companies of the group (currently capitalized at 5,302,000,000 yen), and is a Think tank, representative of Japan. It is the consulting firm of Mitsubishi Group and now employs about 900 people.

== General ==
Mitsubishi Research Institute, Inc., often called MRI, was established at the centennial anniversary of Japan's Mitsubishi Group in 1970, invested by the various companies of the group (currently capitalized at 5,302,000,000 yen), and is a Think tank, representative of Japan.

It is the consulting firm of Mitsubishi Group and now employs about 900 people. It has its branches in Tokyo, Osaka and Nagoya, and has an office in Washington, D.C.

== Subsidiaries ==
MRI owns subsidiaries, such as Mitsubishi Research Institute DCS, often called DCS (Diamond Computer Service), the IT support arm of Mitsubishi UFJ Financial Group (MUFG), which is jointly owned by MRI (60 percent) and MUFG (40 percent). Separately, MUFG has its own Think tank, Mitsubishi UFJ Research and Consulting (MURC) with a staff of 700 people, a conglomeration of former Mitsubishi Bank's Diamond Business Consulting, Bank of Tokyo's Tokyo Research International, Sanwa Bank's Sanwa Research Institute and Tokai Bank's Tokai Research Institute.

== Competition ==
Its competitors are:

- Nomura Research Institute of Nomura Group
- Mizuho Research Institute of Mizuho Financial Group
- Japan Research Institute of Sumitomo Mitsui Financial Group
- Boston Consulting Group
- Arthur D. Little

etc.

== See also ==
- Mitsubishi Group
- Mitsubishi UFJ Financial Group
- Mitsubishi UFJ Research and Consulting
- Mitsubishi Research Institute DCS
- Think tank
- Management consulting
- IT consulting
