= Uemon Ikeda =

Japanese artist and painter

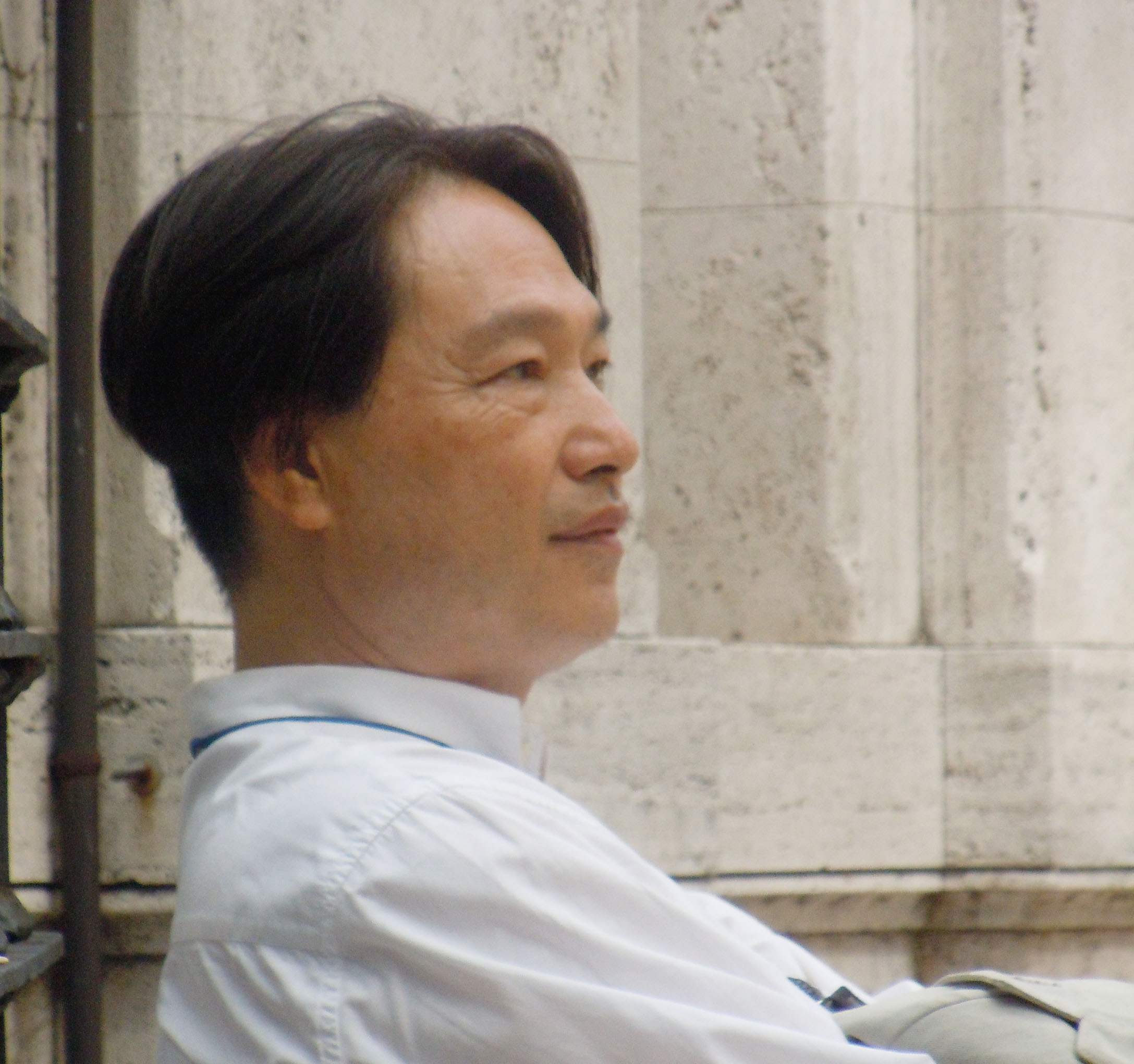
- Born: 1952 (age 73–74); Kobe, Japan
- Known for: Painting

Uemon Ikeda (池田うえもん, Ikeda Uemon; born 1952 in Kobe) is the professional name of Tatsuo Ikeda, a Japanese artist and painter. Uemon Ikeda lives and works in Rome, Italy.

== Career ==
Ikeda moved from Tokyo, Japan to Rome in the 1970s. He studied at Tokyo Metropolitan NishiHigh School. There he attended Venanzo Crocetti's lectures at the Academy of Fine Arts where he graduated in 1977. In the eighties he met Simonetta Lux, who invited him to participate in the collective exhibition named "Simultaneity - New Directions Japanese Contemporary Art" at Palazzo Braschi, (1991).

== Exhibitions ==
In 1989 he had an eponymously named solo exhibition, at the Gallery Lunami (text Masaaki Iseki) in Tokyo, curated by Emiko Namikawa. In 2011 he had an exhibition at TOKI Art Space, Golden Fleece - Jason The beautiful Medea, curated by Noriko Toki. In 1997 he participated at the third festival of art and poetry in Bomarzo Spells. Scenes of art and poetry. NEAR conceived by Lux and Miriam Mirolla, (Museum of Contemporary Arts Laboratory at the University of Tuscia), Palazzo Orsini. On that occasion he met many artists who play an important role in the Italian art world, including Gianfranco Baruchello Fabrizio Crisafulli, Giovanni Di Stefano, Andrea Sheets, Stefano Fontana, Robert Gligorov, Jannis Kounellis, Renato Mambor, Fabio Mauri, Hidetoshi Nagasawa and Achille Perilli.

In 2000 he exhibited in Rome at the Museum of Contemporary Art workshop at La Sapienza University (exhibition) Uemon Ikeda - Tumble and wrote a book: Uemon Ikeda - Simonetta Lux, Acrobazia. In 2005 he exhibited again at the Museum of Contemporary Art Workshop, University of Rome 1 La Sapienza (exhibition) Uemon Ikeda – a boy who wanted to live in the rectangle, curated by Lux.

In 2010 he exhibited at the gallery Hybrida Contemporanea, Rome (exhibition) Jason and the beautiful Medea curated by Emanuela de Notariis. In 2011, The Artist as Rishi appeared at the G. Tucci Museum of Oriental Art, Rome curated by Lori Adragna and Mary Angela Schroth from an idea of Adragna and Enzo Barchi. In 2012 he exhibited at the gallery EMBRICE Post-structures: lines, wires, mazes of Uemon Ikeda curated by Lux and Carlo Severati with Carlo Tomassi: a video performance The Tatsuo Childhood on YouTube and Emma Tagliacollo's interview of Ikeda. He participated at the 13th annual European Day of Jewish Culture that took place on 2 September 2012. The theme was The Spirit of Jewish Humor. For the occasion Ikeda presented an installation featuring spatial geometries with a thread of blue wool and silk depicting the Star of David.

In April 2013 his installation To Have or not to Have at Capitoline Hill was displayed on Earth Day. The project was curated by Francesco Gallo Mazzeo and Studio Marta Bianchi. He joined the retrospective exhibition: Portrait of a City # 2. Art in Rome 1960 - 2001 project that after its first exhibition (November 2012 - April 2013), continues the study of contemporary art in Rome from 1960 to 2001. Ongoing from 16 May until 15 September 2013 to the Museum of Contemporary Art of Rome headquarters on Via Nizza 138 in Rome. On the occasion of the Day of Contemporary Art Oct. 5, 2013 - Installation: Uemon Ikeda. Aerial architectures: lines, wires, web net MAXXI – National Museum of the 21st Century Arts. A great red spider's web, made of wool and silk, was to cloak the museum piazza.

In 2015 he exhibited at Macro La Pelanda - Spazio Factory #RomeSenzatomica - Three Artists for Peace Renato Mambor, Giovanni Albanese, Tatsuo Uemon Ikeda a cura di Guglielmo Gigliotti and Ada Lombardi.

For the 102nd edition of the Nika Exhibition his work was presented at The National Art Center, Tokyo.

In November 2018, after the end of a longlasting and complex restoration of the Hanging Garden of the Royal Palace of Naples, the opening was accompanied by the pathway of a personal site specific installation, designed by the artist and entitled "the Enchanted Garden of the Royal Palace. East of the Sun", curated by Anna Imponente. Numerous students of the academy of fine arts of Naples, coming from different specialty sections, co-operated in the realization of the project consisting of a large star-shaped spider-web running inside the Royal Palace and reaching the Hanging Garden, immediately capturing the look of the involved viewers, collaborators and students.

Among the various declinations of relations between Italy and Japan on the occasion of Japan Week in Venice, 6 September 2019, Uemon Ikeda takes part in the event with an evocative installation "Fragility" by Olimpia de Sanctis - a vault of red thread inspired by Venice and its intrinsic fragility; precarious yet eternal city and above all rooted in the emotional substratum on a planetary level. Coordination and Project Management Studio Marta Bianchi The event was organized by the Italy Japan Foundation, chaired by Ambassador Umberto Vattani, in collaboration with the Municipality of Venice, the support of the Venice International University, the support of the Ca 'Foscari University, and the patronage of the Ministry of Foreign Affairs, of the Italian Embassy in Japan and the Japanese Embassy in Italy, as well as the Municipality of Venice and the Venice Metro on the Island of San Servolo, home to the Venice International University.

Ikeda's work was supported by critics Masaaki Iseki, director of the Tokyo Metropolitan Teien Art Museum, by Simonetta Lux and by Carlos Spartacus. From 2007 to today he collaborates with the Studio Marta Bianchi - InEvoluzionet.
