= Miyazaki at-large district =

Japan House of Councillors constituency

- 宮崎県選挙区
- Parliamentary constituency for the House of Councillors
- Prefecture: Miyazaki
- Electorate: 887,608 (as of September 2022)

Current constituency
- Created: 1947
- Seats: 2
- Councillors: Class of 2019: Makoto Nagamine (LDP); Class of 2022: Shinpei Matsushita (LDP)

Miyazaki at-large district is a constituency in the House of Councillors of Japan, the upper house of the Diet of Japan (national legislature). It currently elects two members to the House of Councillors, one per election. Miyazaki used to be a strictly conservative race, voting for the LDP consistently since 2007.

The LDP has won the election in Miyazaki 5 consecutive times since 2010, however faced a serious challenge from 3 newer options to vote for in 2025. Yamauchi Kanako from the CDP went on to win 1 seat in the 2025 Japanese House of Councillors election, following backlash of LDP candidate Taku Etō in May of 2025. This was due to the remarks he made as nationwide prices surged. He resigned soon after the controversy and stepped down from his position as agricultural minister.
