= Kita-ku, Sakai =

Ward of Sakai, Osaka Prefecture, Japan

Coordinates: 34°33′55.67″N 135°31′1.82″E

Map

Kita-ku in the city

Kita-ku (北区) is a ward of the city of Sakai in Osaka Prefecture, Japan. The ward has an area of 15.58 km^{2} and a population of 154,846. The population density is 9,945 per km^{2}. The name means "North Ward."

The wards of Sakai were established when Sakai became a city designated by government ordinance on April 1, 2006.
