= Centrist Reform Alliance =

Centrist Reform Alliance 中道改革連合 Chūdō Kaikaku Rengō
- Abbreviation: Chūdō; CRA
- Leader: Sō Watanabe
- Founders: Yoshihiko Noda; Tetsuo Saito
- Founded: 15 January 2026
- Dissolved: 17 September 2026 (de facto)
- Merger of: Constitutional Democratic Party of Japan; Komeito
- Succeeded by: Democratic Reform Party; Komeito
- Political position: Centre
- Slogan: 生活者ファースト; Seikatsusha fāsuto ('Ordinary people first')
- Representatives: 1 / 465

Party flag

Website
- craj.jp

The Centrist Reform Alliance (Japanese: 中道改革連合, Hepburn: Chūdō Kaikaku Rengō), abbreviated as Chūdō or CRA, is a centrist moderate political party in Japan. It was the main opposition party in the House of Representatives from February to September 2026, holding 49 seats.

The CRA was formed in January 2026 by the merger of the Constitutional Democratic Party of Japan (CDP) and Komeito in the House of Representatives to challenge the Liberal Democratic Party. It competed in the 2026 general election, where it lost a significant number of seats, with its seat number being reduced from 167 to 49. The CDP and Komeito continued to caucus separately in the House of Councillors and in local elections. After the merger between the parties fell through, the CRA effectively disbanded, with Sō Watanabe remaining for administrative reasons.

== History ==
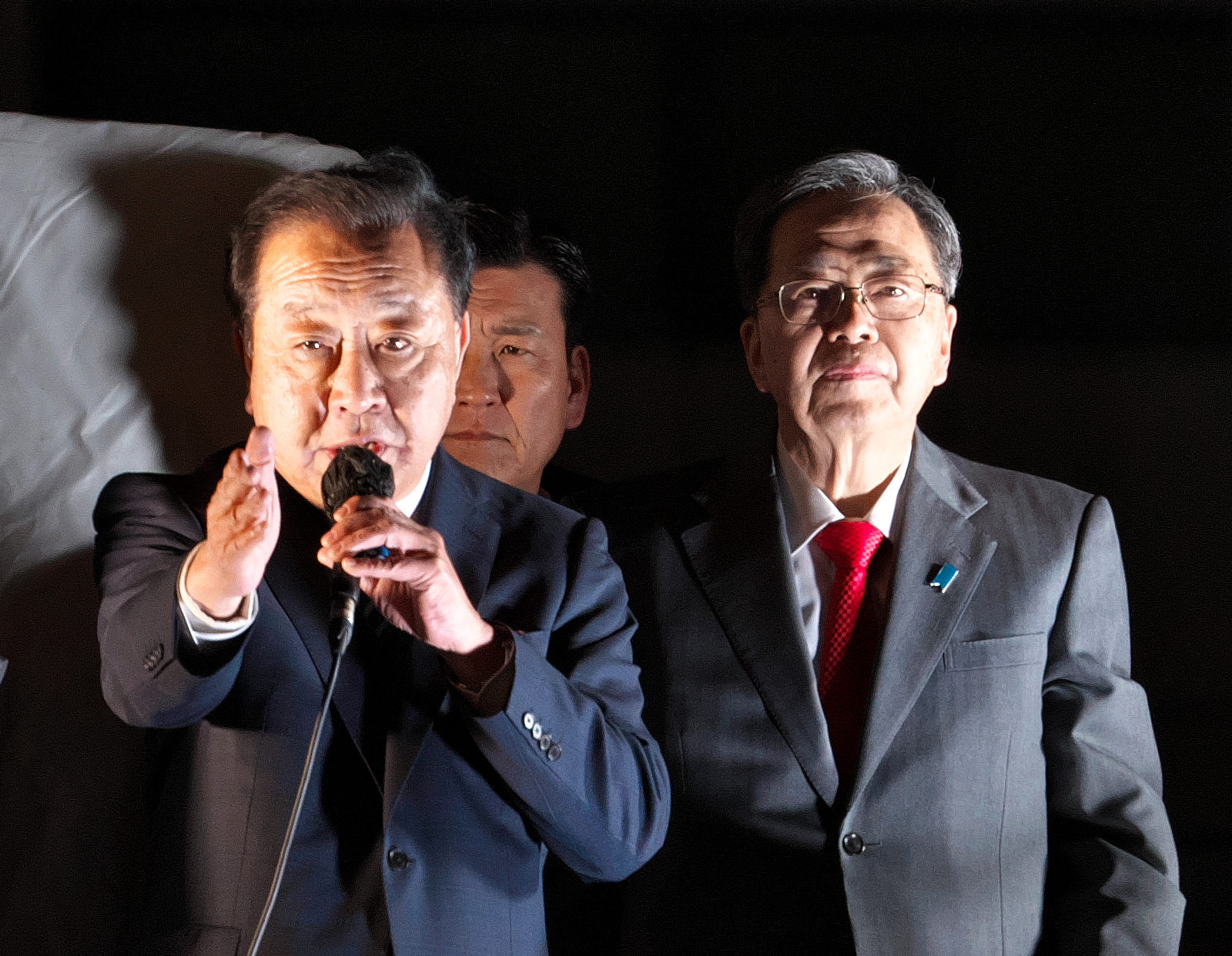
Yoshihiko Noda and Tetsuo Saito gave a street speech for the general election (February 7, 2026)

The party was announced on 15 January 2026 as a centrist merger of the Constitutional Democratic Party of Japan (CDP) and Komeito, amid reports of an early election being called in February 2026. This came after Komeito ended its 26-year coalition with the Liberal Democratic Party (LDP) in October 2025, citing issues like political funding scandals and discomfort with the LDP's shift to the right under Prime Minister Sanae Takaichi. Its establishment was compared to the New Frontier Party that existed from 1994 to 1997. The Democratic Party for the People (DPFP) had additionally been approached by both the CDP and Komeito to participate in the merger, but DPFP leader Yuichiro Tamaki refused offers on 15 January.

On 16 January, CDP leader Yoshihiko Noda and Komeito leader Tetsuo Saito announced the name of the new party, and subsequently informed the Minister of Internal Affairs and Communications of its establishment.

CDP member Kazuhiro Haraguchi additionally announced that he would not join the new party, but would instead turn his existing political organization, the Yukoku Rengo, into a political party. On January 24, Haraguchi and Genzei Nippon leader Takashi Kawamura announced the formation of a new political party, Tax Cuts Japan and Yukoku Alliance.

On 19 January, the party announced its manifesto. In concessions to the Komeito side, the CDP abandoned its longstanding position that the Legislation for Peace and Security was unconstitutional, and dropped its unconditional opposition to nuclear power.

On 20 January, the party announced that 144 of the 148 CDP's House of Representatives legislators would participate in the CRA. Two were set to retire, while two others, including Haraguchi, would not join the CRA. Aoyama, in turn, would run as an unaffiliated candidate. Yoriko Madoka, a DPFP legislator, also planned to participate in the party. The party's merged caucus had 172 seats in the House of Representatives at the time of dissolution. Representatives Ryo Tagaya (Southern Kanto PR Block), who left Reiwa Shinsengumi, and Kunio Arakaki (Okinawa's 2nd district), who left the SDP, also joined the party.

In the 2026 election, the CRA lost a significant number of seats, winning only 49 of them, while the LDP gained seats and secured more than a two-thirds majority of the lower house on its own. 21 CDP-affiliated candidates won seats, down from 144 before, while 28 Komeito-affiliated candidates won seats, up from 21 before. CRA co-presidents Noda and Saito announced their resignation the following day, with Noda saying that the result was "an extremely bitter blow."

On 28 August 2026, CDP leader Shunichi Mizuoka announced that the CDP would not merge with the CRA, effectively collapsing efforts to form a unified party. The following Sunday, the Komeito executive also agreed not to merge with the CRA. On 9 September 2026, the CRA announced that it would disband. Former Komeito members will return to the Komeito. Former CDP members will aim to form a new party with the CDP upper house group, while Sō Watanabe will remain in the CRA as its sole member for several months in order to settle outstanding payments to the private sector using political party subsidies that will be paid. Hirofumi Yoshimura, leader of Nippon Ishin no Kai, criticised this at a press conference on the same day, asking, "Should the one remaining member receive it? They ought to explain the situation to the voters who cast their ballots".

The new party, centred on CDP-aligned members, was named the Democratic Reform Party (民主改革の会, Minshu kaikaku no kai). The departure from the CRA and the formation of the new party were officially announced on 16 September; the new party adopted the CRA's platform, and the leadership team, with Ogawa as leader and Shina as Secretary-General, remained in place.

== Organization ==
Reports alleged that in the House of Councillors, both parties would continue to caucus as separate factions, while in the House of Representatives they would operate together as a single party. CDP leader Yoshihiko Noda and Komeito leader Tetsuo Saito served as co-leaders of the new party until their resignation after the 2026 Japanese general election.

=== Leadership ===
No.	Leader (birth–death)	Constituency	Took office	Left office	Election results
1 (Note: As co-leaders)	Yoshihiko Noda (b. 1957)	Rep for Chiba 14th	15 January 2026	13 February 2026	None
1	Tetsuo Saito (b. 1952)	Rep for Hiroshima 3rd	15 January 2026	13 February 2026	None
2	Junya Ogawa (b. 1971)	Rep for Kagawa 1st	13 February 2026	16 September 2026	2026 Junya Ogawa – 27; Takeshi Shina – 22
3	Sō Watanabe (b. 1977)	Rep for Miyazaki 1st	16 September 2026	Incumbent	

=== Party executive ===
Executive officers as from February to September 2026:

Position	Name
Leader	Junya Ogawa
Deputy Leader	Kanae Yamamoto
Secretary General	Takeshi Shina
Chairman of the Election Strategy Committee	Takeshi Shina
Deputy Secretary General	Hiromasa Nakano
Chairman of the Standing Executive Committee	Makiko Kikuta
Chairman of the Policy Research Council	Mitsunari Okamoto
Chairman of the Diet Affairs Committee	Kazuhiko Shigetoku
Chairman of the Organization Committee	Sō Watanabe
Director of the Executive Office	Sō Watanabe
Chairman of the Public Relations Committee	Shinichi Isa

== Ideology ==
The CRA has been described as centrist. The CRA supports moderate politics, viewing itself as neither conservative or progressive. The party emphasizes its centrist stance, appealing to moderate voters who are disillusioned with the Sanae Takaichi administration. However, political scientist Emma Dalton argues that the CRA was formed based on electoral strategy, not on a shared political ideology, while Jio Kamata finds CRA's strategy to be opportunistic.

Chūdō is the Japanese rendering of the Buddhist term "Middle Way" and is associated with the religious movement Soka Gakkai. Komeito, which serves as Soka Gakkai's political wing, has proclaimed "middle wayism" (中道主義, Chūdō Shugi) in its political platform. Former Komeito leader and CRA co-leader Tetsuo Saito said that the meaning of Chūdō is not to take the midpoint between right and left, but to aim for consensus building among diverse opinions, rather than creating division or conflict.

Saito has claimed that support for social security, an inclusive society, doubling per capita gross domestic product, a realistic diplomatic and security policy, and political and electoral reform, will constitute the backbone of the new party's platform. Specifically, the party denoted five policy pillars: sustainable economic growth, a new social security model, an inclusive society by pursuing gender equality and reducing education opportunity gaps, realistic foreign and defense policies centered on the Japan-US alliance and peace diplomacy, and constant reforms (including transparency in political funds and electoral reforms). The party will pursue a consumption tax cut as well, permanently reducing the consumption tax for foodstuffs to zero. To make up for the revenue shortfall, the party proposes the creation of a sovereign wealth fund.

== Election results ==
=== House of Representatives ===
Election	Leader	Constituency				Party list				Total		Position	Status
Election	Leader	Votes	%	Seats	+/-	Votes	%	Seats	+/-	Seats	+/-	Position	Status
2026	Yoshihiko Noda; Tetsuo Saito	12,209,642	21.63	7 / 289	New	10,438,801	18.23	42 / 176	New	49 / 465	New	2nd	Opposition

== See also ==
- Centrism by country § Japan
- Centrist reformism
- New Frontier Party (Japan)
- Radical centrism
