= Osamu Fujimura =

Japanese politician (born 1949)

- 藤村 修
- Official portrait, 2010

Minister for the Abduction Issue
- In office 24 October 2012 – 26 December 2012
- Prime Minister: Yoshihiko Noda
- Preceded by: Keishu Tanaka
- Succeeded by: Keiji Furuya

Chief Cabinet Secretary
- In office 2 September 2011 – 26 December 2012
- Prime Minister: Yoshihiko Noda
- Preceded by: Yukio Edano
- Succeeded by: Yoshihide Suga

Member of the House of Representatives
- In office 19 July 1993 – 16 November 2012
- Preceded by: Etsuko Sugano
- Succeeded by: Naomi Tokashiki
- Constituency: Osaka 3rd (1993–1996); Osaka 7th (1996–2005); Kinki PR (2005–2009); Osaka 7th (2009–2012)

Personal details
- Born: 3 November 1949 (age 76) Osaka, Japan
- Party: CDP (since 2020)
- Other political affiliations: JNP (1992–1994); NFP (1994–1998); GGP (1998); DPJ (1998–2016); DP (2016–2018); DPP (2018–2020)
- Education: Hiroshima University

Osamu Fujimura (藤村 修, Fujimura Osamu; born 3 November 1949) is a former Japanese politician of the Democratic Party of Japan, who served as Chief Cabinet Secretary under Prime Minister Yoshihiko Noda from 2011 to 2012. He was a member of the House of Representatives from 1993 to 2012.

== Early life and career ==
Osamu Fujimura was born in Osaka on 3 November 1949. He studied engineering at Hiroshima University, where he was a member of the automobile club.

As a student became interested in the plight of orphans from traffic accidents and came in contact with Yoshiomi Tamai. After graduating he began working in the secretariat of the Association for Traffic Accident Orphans, which Tamai founded.

== Political career ==
Fujimura's impetus for going into politics came after Morihiro Hosokawa approached Yoshiomi Tamai about running for the Japan New Party in the 1993 election. Tamai declined but recommended Fujimura to run in his stead. Fujimura was elected to the House of Representatives for the first time from the third district of Osaka Prefecture. Yoshihiko Noda was first elected for the Japan New Party at the same time. Due to subsequent mergers and splits of political parties, Fujimura successively became a member of the New Frontier Party, the "Voice of the People" and the Good Governance Party, before becoming part of the Democratic Party of Japan in 1998. He gradually became a close aide to Yoshihiko Noda.

Fujimura lost his district in the 2005 election but was elected in the proportional block. He regained his district in 2009, which the DPJ won in a landslide. Fujimura became chairman of the Committee on Health, Labour and Welfare in the House of Representatives. When Naoto Kan became prime minister in June 2010, Fujimura was appointed Senior Vice Minister for Foreign Affairs. He was moved to Senior Vice Minister of Health, Labour and Welfare in the September reshuffle. He left to become Deputy Secretary General of the DPJ in June the following year.

In the DPJ leadership election to succeed Naoto Kan in August 2011, Fujimura served as campaign manager for Yoshihiko Noda. When Noda was elected and became prime minister the following month Fujimura was appointed as Chief Cabinet Secretary. He concurrently served as Minister for the Abduction Issue from October 2012.

He lost his seat in the December 2012 election. He resigned along with the rest of the Noda Cabinet later the same month. He joined the Democratic Party for the People, and folded with the majority of the party into the Constitutional Democratic Party of Japan.

House of Representatives (Japan)
Preceded by Naomi Tokashiki	Representative for Osaka 7th district (single-member); 2009–2012	Succeeded by Naomi Tokashiki
Preceded by N/A	Representative for the Kinki proportional representation block 2005–2009	Succeeded by N/A
New district	Representative for Osaka 7th district (single-member); 1996–2005	Succeeded by Naomi Tokashiki
Preceded by Issei Inoue; Ken Harada; Mikio Ōmi; Etsuko Sugano; Kansei Nakano	Representative for Osaka 3rd district 1993–1996; Served alongside: Mikio Ōmi, Kansei Nakano, Issei Inoue, Ken Harada	District eliminated
Preceded by Norihisa Tamura	Chairman of the House of Representatives Committee on Health, Labour and Welfare; 2009–2010	Succeeded by Yoshio Hachiro
Political offices
Preceded by Yukio Edano	Chief Cabinet Secretary; 2011–2012	Succeeded by Yoshihide Suga
Preceded by Ritsuo Hosokawa, Hiroyuki Nagahama	Senior Vice Minister of Health, Labour and Welfare; 2010–2011; Served alongside: Yōko Komiyama	Succeeded by Yōko Komiyama, Kōhei Ōtsuka
Preceded by Kōichi Takemasa, Tetsurō Fukuyama	Senior Vice Minister of Foreign Affairs; 2010; Served alongside: Kōichi Takemasa	Succeeded by Yutaka Banno, Takeaki Matsumoto
