= Chiba 4th district =

Legislative district of Japan

Chiba 4th District
- Parliamentary constituency for the Japanese House of Representatives
- Numbered map of Chiba Prefecture single-member districts
- Prefecture: Chiba
- Proportional District: Minami-Kantō
- Electorate: 463,083 (2021)

Current constituency
- Created: 1994
- Seats: One
- Party: LDP
- Representative: Yūsuke Kashima
- Created from: Chiba's 1st "medium-sized" district
- Municipalities: Parts of Funabashi and Ichikawa cities

Chiba 4th district is a constituency of the House of Representatives in the Diet of Japan, located in Western Chiba. As of 2016, 459,431 eligible voters were registered in the district. In the 2009 and 2012 general elections, the district had the lowest electoral weight throughout Japan at more than two times as many voters as the district with the highest electoral weight, Kōchi-3rd.

Former Prime Minister Yoshihiko Noda represented Chiba 4th district from 2000 until 2024 when he transferred to the newly established Chiba 14th district. Noda initially lost as a candidate for the New Frontier Party by 105 votes to Liberal Democrat Shōichi Tanaka in 1996. Amid the LDP landslide in 2012 that returned them into power, then-PM Noda became a rare DPJ politician who actually increased his share of vote in his constituency.

Before resdistricting, the electoral district covered the city of Funabashi. After 2022 it comprises a part of Funabashi and a part of Ichikawa. Areas of Funabashi that had previously belonged to the 4th were moved to the new 14th district.

Before the electoral reform of 1994, Funabashi was part of Chiba 1st district where four Representatives had been elected by single non-transferable vote.

== List of representatives ==
Representative	Party	Dates	Notes
Shōichi Tanaka	LDP	1996 – 2000	
Yoshihiko Noda	DPJ	2000 – 2016	
Yoshihiko Noda	DP	2016 – 2017	
Yoshihiko Noda	Ind	2017 – 2021	
Yoshihiko Noda	CDP	2021 – 2024	
Hideyuki Mizunuma	CDP	2024 – 2026	
Yūsuke Kashima	LDP	2026 –	

== Election results ==
2026
Party	Candidate	Votes	%	±%
LDP	Yūsuke Kashima	106,236	48.2	▲16.1
Centrist Reform	Hideyuki Mizunuma	71,698	32.5	▼10.8
Sanseitō	Seiko Kudō (elected in S. Kanto PR block)	24,827	11.3	▲4.7
JCP	Rie Tamahori	11,807	5.4	▲0
Genzei–Yukoku	Hiroshi Takahashi	5891	2.7	
Registered electors		407.998		
Turnout			55.26	▲2.68
LDP gain from Centrist Reform				

2024
Party	Candidate	Votes	%	±%
CDP	Hideyuki Mizunuma	90,011	43.3	▼21.2
LDP	Tetsuya Kimura	66,629	32.1	▼3.4
Ishin	Kyōko Amemiya	26,222	12.6	
Sanseitō	Seiko Kudō	13,736	6.6	New
JCP	Kenta Yakama	11,131	5.4	
Turnout			52.58	▼0.11
Registered electors		406,084		
CDP hold				

2021
Party	Candidate	Votes	%	±%
CDP	Yoshihiko Noda	154,412	64.55	▲4.56
LDP	Tetsuya Kimura	84,813	35.45	▲7.34
Majority		70.399	29.10	▼2.38
Turnout			52.69	▲3.28
CDP hold		Swing	▼1.19	

2017
Party	Candidate	Votes	%	±%
Independent	Yoshihiko Noda	131,024	59.59	▲8.90
LDP	Tetsuya Kimura (elected by PR, endorsed by Kōmeitō)	61,804	28.11	▼1.21
JCP	Toshirō Fukatsu	14,955	6.80	▼3.73
Ishin	Hiroshi Satō	12,104	5.50	N/A
Majority		69,220	31.48	
Turnout			49.41	▼3.75
Independent hold		Swing	▲5.06	

2014
Party	Candidate	Votes	%	±%
Democratic	Yoshihiko Noda	119,193	51.69	▼5.59
LDP	Tetsuya Kimura (endorsed by Kōmeitō)	67,600	29.32	▲4.01
JCP	Kazuko Saitō (elected by PR)	24,275	10.53	▲3.00
Independent	Ken'ichi Nishio (endorsed by the Greens)	19,510	8.46	N/A
Majority		51,593	22.37	
Turnout			53.16	▼6.30
Democratic hold		Swing	▼4.80	

2012
Party	Candidate	Votes	%	±%
Democratic	Yoshihiko Noda (endorsed by PNP)	163,334	57.28	▲3.64
LDP	Mikio Fujita (endorsed by NKP)	72,187	25.31	▼2.95
Tomorrow	Yukiko Miyake (endorsed by NPD)	28,187	9.88	N/A
JCP	Kazuko Saitō	21,459	7.53	▼0.09
Majority		91,147	31.97	
Turnout		307,954	59.46	▼3.67
Democratic hold		Swing	▲3.30	

In 2009, Yoshihiko Noda's candidacy was formally supported by the People's New Party, Mikio Fujita by New Komeito.

2009
Party	Candidate	Votes	%	±%
Democratic	Yoshihiko Noda (endorsed by PNP)	162,153	53.64	▲8.75
LDP	Mikio Fujita (endorsed by NKP)	85,425	28.26	▼16.32
Your	Itoko Noyashiki	28,280	9.35	N/A
JCP	Kazuko Saitō	23,050	7.62	▼0.73
Happiness Realization	Kōichirō Yamanaka	3,403	1.13	N/A
Majority		76,728	25.38	
Turnout		307,954	63.13	▼0.24
Democratic hold		Swing	▲12.52	

2005
Party	Candidate	Votes	%	±%
Democratic	Yoshihiko Noda	129,834	44.89	▼10.9
LDP	Mikio Fujita (elected by PR, endorsed by NKP)	128,890	44.58	▲11.7
JCP	Toshinori Niki	24,138	8.35	▼2.9
Independent	Kōji Nagano	6,311	2.18	N/A
Majority		956	0.31	
Turnout		294,777	63.37	▲9.08
Democratic hold		Swing	▼11.3	

2003
Party	Candidate	Votes	%	±%
Democratic	Yoshihiko Noda	135,522	55.8	▲8.5
LDP	Masaru Hasegawa (endorsed by NKP)	80,051	32.9	▼1.9
JCP	Yukiko Tsuga	27,441	11.3	▼6.9
Turnout		249,446	54.29	▲9.08
Democratic hold		Swing	▲5.2	

2000
Party	Candidate	Votes	%	±%
Democratic	Yoshihiko Noda	116,156	47.3	▲15.4
LDP	Ken'ichi Nishio (endorsed by NKP)	76,067	31.0	▼1.0
JCP	Shōji Ishii	44,586	18.2	▲2.0
Liberal League	Yutaka Akimoto	8,899	3.5	N/A
Democratic gain from LDP		Swing	▲8.2	

1996
Party	Candidate	Votes	%	±%
LDP	Shōichi Tanaka	73,792	32.0	
New Frontier	Yoshihiko Noda	73,687	31.9	
Democratic	Takayuki Kojima	45,924	19.9	
JCP	Shin'ichi Maruyama	37,300	16.2	
Turnout		235,653	55.07	
LDP win (new seat)				

House of Representatives (Japan)
Preceded by Tokyo 18th district	Constituency represented by the prime minister 2011 – 2012	Succeeded by Yamaguchi 4th district
