= Osaka 7th district =

Single-member constituency in Japan

Numbered map of Osaka Prefecture single-member districts

'''Osaka 7th district''' (大阪府第7区, ''Osaka-fu dai-nana-ku'', or simply 大阪7区, ''Osaka-nana-ku'') is a single-member constituency of the House of Representatives in the national Diet of Japan. It is located in north-central Osaka Prefecture and covers the cities of Suita and Settsu. In 2012, the district had 352,998 registered eligible voters.

Before the introduction of parallel voting and single-member districts, the area had been part of the five-member Ōsaka 3rd district.

Liberal Democrat Naomi Tokashiki (Nukaga faction) who won one of three seats for the Liberal Democratic Party in Osaka in 2012. The previous incumbent, Osamu Fujimura, Chief Cabinet Secretary in the Noda cabinet, only ranked third – in 2012, the Democratic Party was reduced to third or even fourth party in many of Osaka's electoral districts, and nationwide seven sitting members of the Noda cabinet lost their seat in the House of Representatives. Fujimura had represented the pre-reform 3rd district for the Japan New Party since 1993 and won the new 7th district in 1996. He held onto the seat until the landslide election of 2005 when Tokashiki, then a newcomer in national politics, beat him for the first time. Fujimura regained his district seat in 2009.

== List of representatives ==
Representative	Party	Dates	Notes
Osamu Fujimura	NFP	1996–2005	Joined Kokumin no Koe ("Voice of the People"; ?)→Minseitō ("Democratic Party"; Good Governance Party)→Minshutō ("Democratic Party"; Democratic Party of Japan)
Osamu Fujimura	DPJ	1996–2005	Reelected in the Kinki PR block ("Loss ratio": 85.9%)
Naomi Tokashiki	LDP	2005–2009	Failed reelection in the Kinki PR block ("Loss ratio": 63.4%)
Osamu Fujimura	DPJ	2009–2012	Failed reelection in the Kinki PR block ("Loss ratio": 64.7%)
Naomi Tokashiki	LDP	2012–2021	
Takemitsu Okushita	Ishin	2021–	

== Election results ==
2026
Party	Candidate	Votes	%	±%
Ishin	Takemitsu Okushita	88,242	39.1	▼5.4
LDP	Naomi Tokashiki (elected in Kinki PR block)	78,582	34.9	▲3.8
Sanseitō	Masaru Ishikawa (elected in Kinki PR block)	30,439	13.5	▲4.2
JCP	Tatsuma Kawasoe	28,167	12.5	▼2.6
Registered electors		389,482		
Turnout			60.22	▲3.53
Ishin hold				

2024
Party	Candidate	Votes	%	±%
Ishin	Takemitsu Okushita	95,367	44.54	▼0.80
LDP	Naomi Tokashiki (endorsed by Komeito	66,435	31.03	▼0.67
JCP	Tatsuma Kawasoe	32,368	15.12	▲6.24
Sanseitō	Kazuhiko Ikegami	19,941	9.31	
Turnout		214,111	56.69	▼3.33
Ishin hold				

2021
Party	Candidate	Votes	%	±%
Ishin	Takemitsu Okushita	102,486	45.3	▲9.9
LDP	Naomi Tokashiki	71,592	31.7	▼11.9
CDP	Ryōsuke Nogi	24,952	11.0	
JCP	Tatsuma Kawasoe	20,083	8.9	▼12.1
Reiwa	Hiroki Nishikawa	6,927	3,1	
Turnout			60.02	▲8.21
Ishin gain from LDP				

2017
Party	Candidate	Votes	%	±%
LDP	Naomi Tokashiki	82,337	43.6	▲0.4
Ishin	Takemitsu Okushita	66,780	35.4	▼0.7
JCP	Kumiko Muraguchi	39,602	21.0	▲0.3
Turnout			51.80	▼2.50
LDP hold				

2014
Party	Candidate	Votes	%	±%
LDP	Naomi Tokashiki	81,109	43.2	▲9.9
Ishin	Sayuri Uenishi (won PR seat)	67,719	36.1	▲6.4
JCP	Kumiko Muraguchi	38,928	20.7	▲8.4
Turnout			54.30	
LDP hold				

2012
Party	Candidate	Votes	%	±%
LDP – NK	Naomi Tokashiki	70,361	33.3	
JRP – YP	Sayuri Uenishi (won PR seat)	62,856	29.7	
DPJ – PNP	Osamu Fujimura	45,531	21.5	
JCP	Tae Ishikawa	21,569	10.2	
TPJ – NPD	Yoshihiko Watanabe	10,989	5.2	

2009
Party	Candidate	Votes	%	±%
DPJ (SDP, PNP support)	Osamu Fujimura	124,982	52.9	
LDP (Kōmeitō support)	Naomi Tokashiki	79,289	33.5	
JCP	Masao Komai	29,030	12.3	
HRP	Yoshitaka Mizunuma	3,063	1.3	
Turnout		241,669	69.19	

2005
Party	Candidate	Votes	%	±%
LDP	Naomi Tokashiki	98,151	43.4	
DPJ	Osamu Fujimura (elected by PR)	84,373	37.3	
JCP	Shigeru Ariki	27,573	12.2	
Independent	Katsuya Yamaguchi	16,256	7.2	
Turnout		233,740	67.19	

2003
Party	Candidate	Votes	%	±%
DPJ	Osamu Fujimura	72,643	39.2	
LDP	Issei Inoue	55,234	29.8	
JCP	Sachiko Fujii	28,710	15.5	
"Assembly of Independents"	Shirō Arisawa	19,949	10.8	
Independent	Yoshinobu Sakamoto	8,701	4.7	
Turnout		192,098	55.48	

2000
Party	Candidate	Votes	%	±%
DPJ	Osamu Fujimura	63,455	34.1	
CP	Issei Inoue	52,210	28.1	
JCP	Sachiko Fujii	41,727	22.4	
Independent	Shirō Arisawa	28,712	15.4	

1996
Party	Candidate	Votes	%	±%
NFP	Osamu Fujimura	53,968	31.7	
LDP	Shirō Arisawa	40,572	23.8	
JCP	Sachiko Fujii	39,503	23.2	
DPJ	Masahiro Nakatsukasa	36,439	21.4	
Turnout		176,371	53.74	
