= 2011 Democratic Party of Japan leadership election =

Political party election in Japan

- 29 August 2011
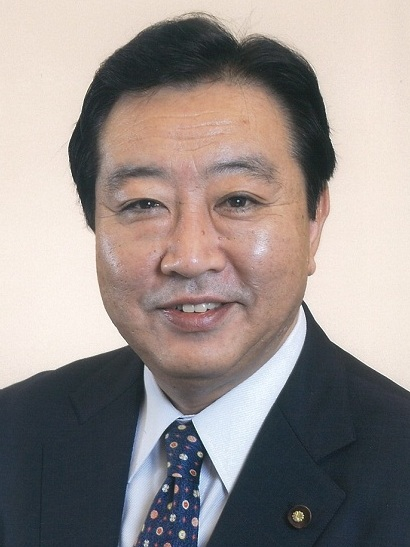

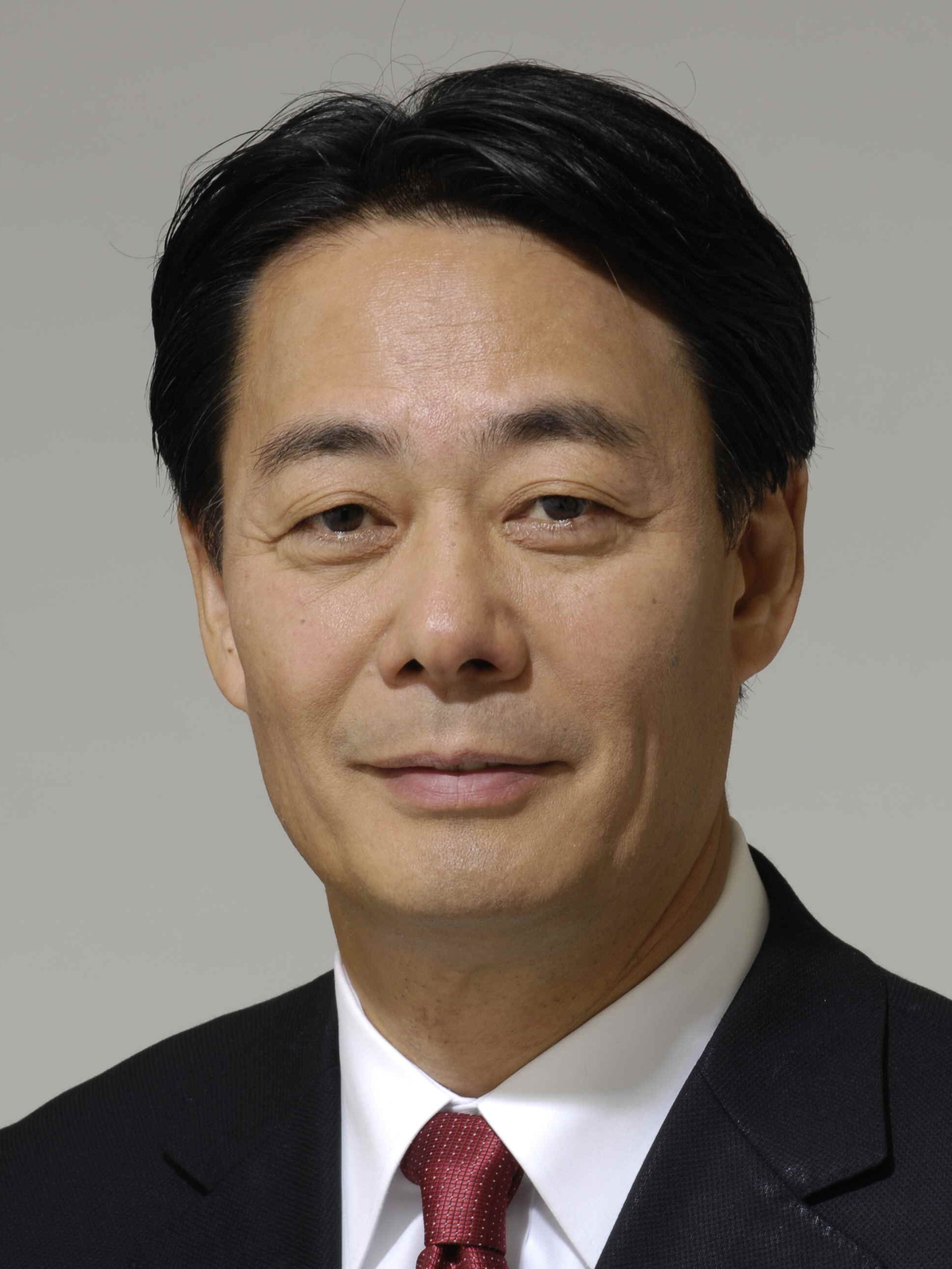

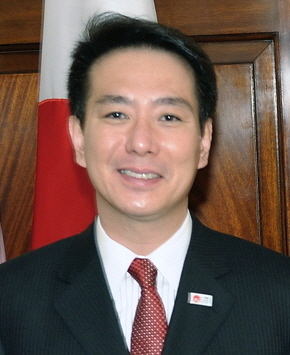

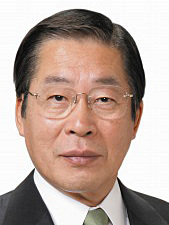

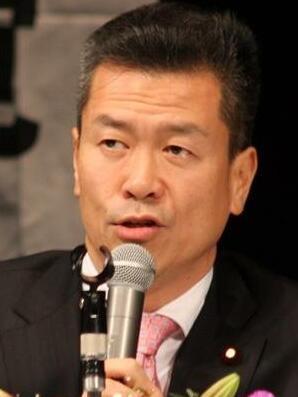
Candidate	Yoshihiko Noda	Banri Kaieda	Seiji Maehara
Leader's seat	Chiba 4th	Tokyo 1st	Kyoto 2nd
First round	102 (25.8%)	143 (36.2%)	74 (18.7%)
Runoff	213 (54.8%)	177 (45.2%)
Candidate	Michihiko Kano	Sumio Mabuchi
Leader's seat	Yamagata 1st	Nara 1st
First round	52 (13.2%)	24 (6.1%)
President before election
Naoto Kan
Elected President
Yoshihiko Noda

The 2011 Democratic Party of Japan leadership election took place on 29 August 2011. The election was held to replace outgoing president and Prime Minister Naoto Kan, who resigned on 26 August.

In a field of five candidates, finance minister Yoshihiko Noda pulled off a come-from-behind victory against economy minister Banri Kaieda. Noda secured support from members who had previously supported Seiji Maehara and Michihiko Kano, delivering him a majority in the runoff. Noda was elected Prime Minister by the Diet on 30 August and formally appointed by Emperor Akihito on 2 September.

== Background ==
Naoto Kan became Prime Minister in June 2010. After losing the upper house elections the following month, he experienced difficulty pursuing his legislative agenda and faced declining ratings. By December, his approval had fallen below 30% and the DPJ was trailing in the polls. Kan's position worsened further after the March 2011 Tōhoku earthquake and tsunami. The government's response, particularly its handling of the Fukushima nuclear accident, was viewed as slow and insufficient. The DPJ suffered losses in the unified local elections the following month.

In June, anti-Kan factions of the party, led by Ichirō Ozawa with the support of Yukio Hatoyama, threatened to join the Liberal Democratic and Komeito opposition in supporting a motion of no confidence to bring Kan down. To defuse the situation and prevent a split in the party, Kan promised to resign in the near future. The motion was defeated by a margin of 293 to 152. On the 27th, he announced that he would resign after the passage of three key bills: a second supplementary budget for the 2011 fiscal year, a bill promoting renewable energy, and a debt financing bill for disaster reconstruction. After negotiations with the LDP, the first was passed in July and the latter two on 26 August, at which time Kan resigned.

== Electoral system ==
Candidates were required to gather endorsements from twenty (maximum 25) of the party's members of the National Diet in order to stand. Of the party's 407 Diet members, 398 were eligible to vote; nine had been temporarily suspended for violating party discipline on the floor of the Diet. (Note: The suspended members were Tamiko Kasahara, Tomotaro Kawashima, Nobuaki Miwa, Kazumasa Okajima, Kazumi Ota, Ichirō Ozawa, Makiko Tanaka, Akira Uchiyama, and Koichiro Watanabe.) If no candidate won more than 50% of votes, a runoff was to be held the same day. Nominations were taken on the 27th and the election held on the 29th.

== Candidates ==
Candidate	Offices held
Banri Kaieda (age 62); Tokyo	Member of the House of Representatives (1993–2005, 2009–); Minister of Economy, Trade and Industry (2011–)
Yoshihiko Noda (age 54); Chiba Prefecture	Member of the House of Representatives (1993–1996, 2000–); Minister of Finance (2010–)
Seiji Maehara (age 49); Kyoto Prefecture	Member of the House of Representatives (1993–); Minister of Land, Infrastructure, Transport and Tourism (2009–10); Minister for Foreign Affairs (2010–11)
Michihiko Kano (age 69); Yamagata Prefecture	Member of the House of Representatives (1976–2005, 2009–); Minister of Agriculture, Forestry and Fisheries (1989–90, 2010–)
Sumio Mabuchi (age 51); Nara Prefecture	Member of the House of Representatives (2003–); Minister of Land, Infrastructure, Transport and Tourism (2010–11)

=== Sponsors ===
Banri Kaieda (25)	Yoshihiko Noda (25)	Seiji Maehara (24)	Michihiko Kano (25)	Sumio Mabuchi (20)
House of Representatives: Hirotaka Akamatsu; Shouzo Azuma; Akio Fukuda; Kazuhiro Haraguchi; Akihiro Hatsushika; Masaaki Itokawa; Hiroshi Kawauchi; Yasuko Komiyama; Yorihisa Matsuno; Osamu Nakagawa; Ikko Nakatsuka; Eiko Okamoto; Ichirō Okunoso; Sakihito Ozawa; Megumu Tsuji; Ikuo Yamahana; House of Councillors: Yukihisa Fujita; Motoyuki Odachi; Toshio Ogawa; Mitsuru Sakurai; Koji Sato; Norio Takeuchi; Ryoko Tani; Kuniko Tanioka; Misako Yasui	House of Representatives: Satoshi Arai; Takako Ebata; Osamu Fujimura; Hiroki Hanasaki; Hiroaki Hashimoto; Shūhei Kishimoto; Yōsuke Kondō; Seishu Makino; Daisuke Matsumoto; Mitsuo Mitani; Tetsuo Morimoto; Yoichiro Morioka; Hiroyuki Moriyama; Masaharu Nakagawa; Hiroshi Ogushi; Masanao Shibahashi; Koichi Takemasa; Yoshio Tezuka; Akashi Uchikoshi; Ryoji Yamada; Tsuyoshi Yamaguchi; Hajime Yatagawa; House of Councillors: Hajime Hirota; Hiroyuki Nagahama; Renhō	House of Representatives: Yoshinobu Achiha; Motohisa Furukawa; Goshi Hosono; Masae Ido; Kenta Izumi; Takashi Kii; Makiko Kikuta; Yoko Komiyama; Takahiro Kuroiwa; Hirobumi Niki; Junya Ogawa; Mai Ohara; Susumu Saito; Mitsu Shimojo; Shoichi Takahashi; Miho Takai; Shu Watanabe; Kazunori Yamanoi; Michiyoshi Yunoki; House of Councillors: Kumiko Hayashi; Daigo Matsuura; Tomoji Nakatani; Katsuya Ogawa; Hisashi Tokunaga	House of Representatives: Hiyohito Hashimoto; Toshikazu Higuchi; Motohisa Ikeda; Katsuyuki Ishida; Hidesaburo Kawamura; Kōki Kobayashi; Nobuhiro Koyama; Daizo Kusuda; Kimiaki Matsuzaki; Yoshikatsu Nakayama; Akihiro Ohata; Atsushi Oshima; Takahiro Sasaki; Takashi Shinohara; Yoshinori Suematsu; Masayo Tanabu; Nobutaka Tsutsui; Miki Wajima; Koichi Yoshida; House of Councillors: Yasue Funayama; Shinkun Haku; Takeshi Maeda; Teruhiko Mashiko; Motohiro Ōno; Kusuo Oshima	House of Representatives: Nobuyuki Fukushima; Toshiro Ishii; Kayoko Isogai; Mari Kushibuchi; Takeshi Miyazaki; Takashi Nagayasu; Kensuke Onishi; Naoto Sakaguchi; Kazumi Sugimoto; Takashi Takai; Tsutomu Takamura; Mamoru Takano; Satoshi Takayama; Makoto Taki; Kimiyoshi Tamaki; Masashige Yoshikawa; House of Councillors: Kenzo Fujisue; Kiyoshige Maekawa; Marutei Tsurunen; Yoshiro Yokomine

=== Withdrew ===
- Sakihito Ozawa, member of the House of Representatives (1993–), Minister of the Environment (2009–10)
- Shinji Tarutoko, member of the House of Representatives (1993–2005, 2009–), candidate in the June 2010 contest

== Contest ==
Seiji Maehara was initially considered the frontrunner, alongside Yoshihiko Noda and Banri Kaieda. He was the most popular candidate with the public and was favoured by younger Diet members. Maehara and Noda were factionally aligned and shared overlapping bases of support. However, Noda was believed to have less baggage and fewer enemies within the party, and more likely to be able to cultivate a working relationship with the opposition LDP.

Ichirō Ozawa and Yoshito Sengoku were the key powerbrokers in the contest; the latter supported Maehara from early on. After announcing his candidacy on the 23rd, Maehara adjusted his messaging in order to also appeal to Ozawa, who was wavering on who to back. Ozawa and Sengoku met the same evening in an attempt to coordinate, but talks failed when Sengoku refused Ozawa's request to be appointed secretary-general in return for supporting Maehara. Ozawa, unable to run himself due to his suspension, began searching for another candidate. He initially passed over Kaieda or Kano since they were also rumoured to be backed by Sengoku, but after failing to convince allies Azuma Koshiishi and Takeo Nishioka to stand, he reluctantly threw his support behind Kaieda since he was also acceptable to Hatoyama. Takao Toshikawa attributed about 100 members to Ozawa's faction in addition to 40 from Hatoyama's faction. In order to secure a majority, they aimed to exploit the divide between Noda and Maehara, and form an alliance with Michihiko Kano in the runoff. He also judged that the Kan faction's decision not to recommend a candidate in the first round would damage Maehara to Noda's benefit, further casting doubt on the outcome.

A Kyodo News survey from August showed Maehara as the most popular candidate among the public with 28% support, compared to 4.8% for Noda. A poll for the Asahi Shimbun on 20–21 August found 39.7% preferred Maehara, followed by 10.1% for Kaieda, 7.2% for Noda, 5.8% for Mabuchi, 2.9% for Sakihito Ozawa, 1.2% for Kano, and 0.4% for Tarutoko. Another Asahi poll on 25–26 August found 40% support for Maehara, 5% each for Kaieda and Kazuhiro Haraguchi, 4% for Noda and Mabuchi, 3% for Ozawa, 1% for Kano, and 0% for Tarutoko.

Both Noda and Maehara stated they would seek a grand coalition with the LDP. Noda advocated raising the consumption tax; Kaieda, Kano, and Mabuchi opposed any rise in the tax and preferred to issue more bonds to raise public funds. Maehara held a middle position, stating that he would focus on promoting growth rather than tax hikes. Noda and Maehara were also considered strong advocates of the U.S.–Japan Alliance and the Trans-Pacific Partnership, while Kaieda took a more pro-China position. Both he and Kano opposed the TPP. All candidates took a softer line on nuclear power than outgoing Prime Minister Kan, but both Kaieda and Maehara supported a gradual phase-out. Noda was considered the most pro-nuclear candidate, calling for shut-down plants to be restarted. Kaieda advocated greater spending on public works to drive recovery from the earthquake and tsunami. Kaieda, Kano, and Mabuchi also supported reviewing Ichirō Ozawa's party suspension, which Maehara opposed. Kaieda stated that the party "needed Mr. Ozawa’s strength to overcome [Japan's] problems".

== Results ==
Prime Minister Kan asked his close ally Toshimi Kitazawa to mediate between the other camps to prevent Ozawa's preferred candidate, Kaieda, from securing victory. He met with Sengoku, secretary-general Katsuya Okada, and Jun Azumi the day before the election, all of whom agreed to coordinate their votes in the event of a runoff ballot. Sengoku and Osamu Fujimura then reached out to Kano and Akihiro Ohata, persuading them that a Kaieda victory would render the Diet ungovernable. Kano agreed, but warned that his faction would not vote for Maehara; Sengoku then suggested he could direct votes to Noda instead.

The Nikkei reported that, on the eve of the election, the Maehara camp expected to receive 70–80 votes and it remained unclear whether he or Noda would place second. They reported that moderate and undecided Diet members coalesced around Noda in the final stage due to antipathy toward Maehara campaign leaders such as Sengoku and movement in Noda's direction from the Kan faction. His support climbed to 90 votes on the 28th, and ultimately totalled 102 on the ballot itself. The Kaieda camp estimated their support at 160 votes, but received only 143.

With the Maehara camp's backing secure for Noda, the runoff was decided by supporters of Kano and Mabuchi. The Kaieda camp reported their difficulty in securing additional votes; approaches to younger, floating members came across as "overbearing". Kaieda's unclear policy proposals, his poor public speaking, and the belief that he was the candidate of Ozawa and Hatoyama were also given as reasons for his failure. Mabuchi told his supporters that he was backing Kaieda in the runoff, but they did not close ranks and a number voted for Noda instead. Kano arranged a system to indicate which way to vote in the runoff: if he removed his jacket after the two candidates' final speeches, he was backing Noda. He indeed removed his jacket and approximately 30 of his supporters followed, delivering Noda victory.

Candidate	First round		Runoff	
Candidate	Votes	%	Votes	%
Banri Kaieda	143	36.2	177	45.2
Yoshihiko Noda	102	25.8	215	54.8
Seiji Maehara	74	18.7		
Michihiko Kano	52	13.2		
Sumio Mabuchi	24	6.1		
Total	395	100.00	392	100.0
Invalid	0		3	
Turnout	395	99.2	395	99.2
Eligible	398		398	
Source: First round, Runoff
