= Hideyuki Mizunuma =

Japanese politician (born 1990)

- 水沼 秀幸
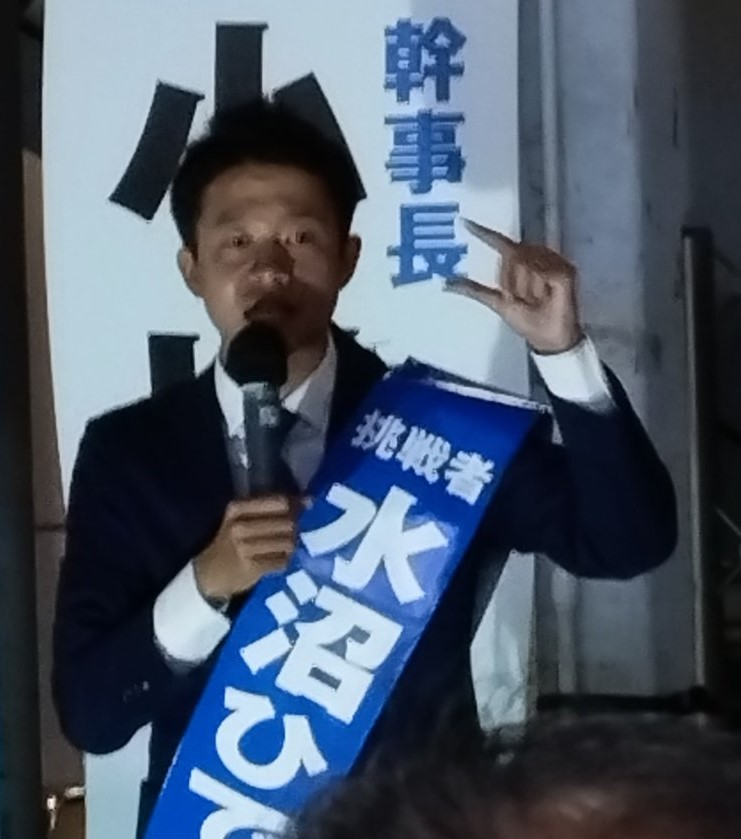
- Mizunuma in 2024

Member of the House of Representatives
- In office 27 October 2024 – 23 January 2026
- Preceded by: Yoshihiko Noda
- Succeeded by: Yusuke Kashima
- Constituency: Chiba 4th

Personal details
- Born: 28 June 1990 (age 36) Funabashi, Chiba, Japan
- Party: CRA (since 2026)
- Other political affiliations: CDP (2024–2026)
- Education: Waseda University

Hideyuki Mizunuma (水沼秀幸, Mizunuma Hideyuki; born 28 June 1990) is a Japanese politician who served as a member of the House of Representatives from 2024 to 2026. He is the vice chairman of the Constitutional Democratic Party in Chiba Prefecture.
