= Naomi Tokashiki =

Japanese politician (born 1962)

- 渡嘉敷 奈緒美
- Official portrait, 2017

Member of the House of Representatives
- Incumbent
- Assumed office 9 February 2026
- Preceded by: Multi-member district
- Constituency: Kinki PR
- In office 17 December 2012 – 14 October 2021
- Preceded by: Osamu Fujimura
- Succeeded by: Takemitsu Okushita
- Constituency: Osaka 7th
- In office 11 September 2005 – 21 July 2009
- Preceded by: Osamu Fujimura
- Succeeded by: Osamu Fujimura
- Constituency: Osaka 7th

Member of the Suginami City Assembly
- In office 1999–2005

Personal details
- Born: 16 July 1962 (age 64) Kyoto, Japan
- Party: Liberal Democratic
- Education: Showa University; Waseda University

Naomi Tokashiki (渡嘉敷 奈緒美, Tokashiki Naomi; born 16 July 1962) is a Japanese politician who is serving in the House of Representatives in the Diet (national legislature) as a member of the Liberal Democratic Party.

== Early life ==
Tokashiki is a native of Kyoto, Kyoto and graduated from Showa University and the business school at Waseda University. Prior to her political career she worked for Shiseido.

== Political career ==
Tokashiki was elected to the House of Representatives for the first time in 2005. Prior to that she served in the local assembly in Suginami, Tokyo. She was defeated in the 2009 House of Representatives election by former MP Osamu Fujimura of the DPJ.

House of Representatives (Japan)
Preceded by Osamu Fujimura	Member of the House of Representatives from Osaka 7th district 2005–2009; 2012–2021	Succeeded by Osamu Fujimura
Preceded by Osamu Fujimura	Member of the House of Representatives from Osaka 7th district 2005–2009; 2012–2021	Succeeded by Takemitsu Okushita
Political offices
Preceded by Masaaki Itokawa; Satoshi Umemura	Parliamentary Secretary for Health, Labour and Welfare; 2012–2013; Served alongside: Tamayo Marukawa	Succeeded by Shuichi Takatori; Kiyomi Akaishi
