= Nobuko Kan =

Japanese essayist (born 1945)

- 菅 伸子
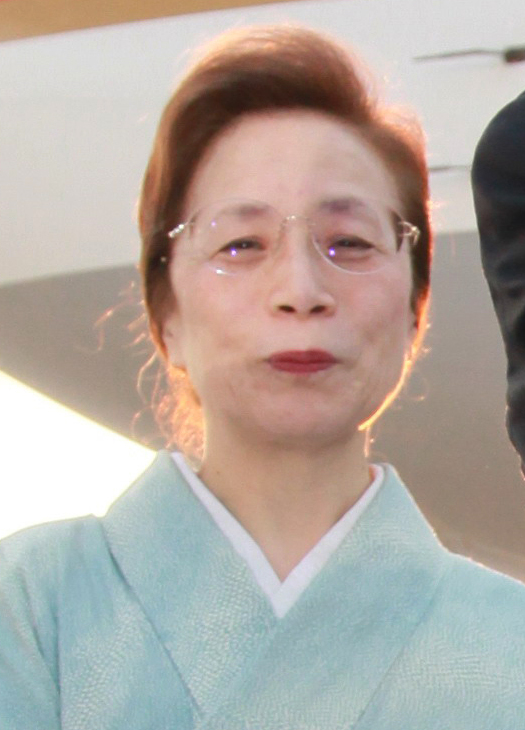

Spouse of the Prime Minister of Japan
- In role 8 June 2010 – 2 September 2011
- Monarch: Akihito
- Prime Minister: Naoto Kan
- Preceded by: Miyuki Hatoyama
- Succeeded by: Hitomi Noda

Personal details
- Born: Nobuko Himei; 3 October 1945 (age 80) Konkō, Okayama, Japan
- Spouse: Naoto Kan (m. 1970)
- Children: 2
- Occupation: Essayist

Nobuko Kan (菅 伸子, Kan Nobuko; born 3 October 1945) is a Japanese essayist and wife of Naoto Kan, who was the Prime Minister of Japan from June 2010 – September 2011.

== Biography ==
Kan was born Nobuko Himei on 3 October 1945, in Konkō, Okayama. Her father and grandfather were doctors and her mother was on the city council. Kan studied at Tsuda University, where she met Naoto Kan. She went on to study at Waseda University so that she could stay in Tokyo with Naoto, and graduated in 1970. They married that winter. However, because they are first cousins, the engagement was met with parental opposition.

Kan campaigned for Naoto while raising their sons, Gentaro and Shinjiro. She would go door to door to talk to people and answer questions for housewives. She also made speeches and has been described by the Irish Times as 'a formidable campaign speaker'.

When magazines spread rumors of Naoto having an affair with a television announcer, Kan famously scolded him for letting his guard down, they brushed the incident off.

During Naoto's time as the Prime Minister of Japan, Nobuko did not want to be called the First Lady, saying that she is simply Naoto's wife. Kan also gained a reputation as a scold when she wrote a book that was surprisingly critical of her husband, talking not only about the occasionally lackluster delivery of his speeches, but also about his inability to cook and lack of fashion sense. Its English title was "What on Earth Will Change in Japan After You Become Prime Minister?". Naoto has called her his toughest critic, and said that he has not read the book. The two regularly debate about politics and have opposing viewpoints on controversial issues like the death penalty.

Some of the things that Naoto had done during his career were at Kan's urging, such as publicly apologizing after the government had distributed blood that was contaminated with AIDS.

== Selected bibliography ==
- Kan, Nobuko (2010). あなたが総理になって、いったい日本の何が変わるの [What on Earth Will Change in Japan After You Become Prime Minister?]. Tokyo: 幻冬舎. ISBN 9784344981737.

Unofficial roles
Preceded by Miyuki Hatoyama	Spouse of the Prime Minister of Japan; 2010–2011	Succeeded by Hitomi Noda
