= Shōichi Tanaka =

Japanese politician (1937–2025)

- 田中 昭一

Member of the House of Representatives
- In office 21 October 1996 – 2 June 2000
- Preceded by: Constituency established
- Succeeded by: Yoshihiko Noda
- Constituency: Chiba 4th

Speaker of the Chiba Prefectural Assembly
- In office May 1995 – July 1996

Member of the Chiba Prefectural Assembly
- In office 1975–1996

Member of the Funabashi City Assembly
- In office 1971–1975

Personal details
- Born: 1 January 1937 Funabashi, Chiba, Japan
- Died: 15 October 2025 (aged 88) Funabashi, Chiba, Japan
- Political party: Liberal Democratic
- Occupation: Farmer

Shōichi Tanaka (Japanese: 田中昭一 Tanaka Shōichi; 1 January 1937 – 15 October 2025) was a Japanese politician. A member of the Liberal Democratic Party, he served in the House of Representatives from 1996 to 2000.

Tanaka died in Funabashi on 15 October 2025, at the age of 88.
