= Hitomi Noda =

Spouse of the Japanese Prime Minister from 2011 to 2012

- 野田 仁実
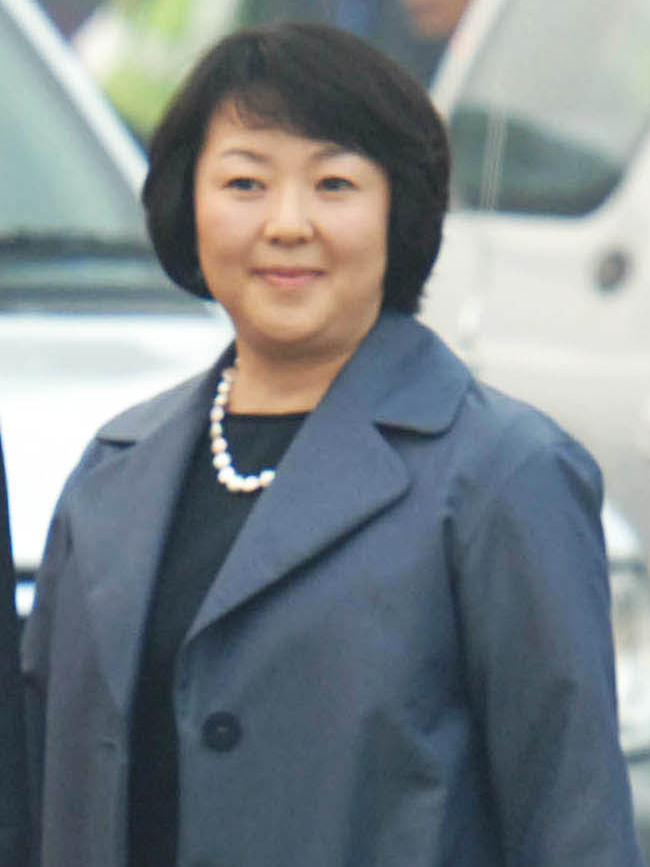

Spouse of the Prime Minister of Japan
- In role 2 September 2011 – 26 December 2012
- Monarch: Akihito
- Prime Minister: Yoshihiko Noda
- Preceded by: Nobuko Kan
- Succeeded by: Akie Abe

Personal details
- Born: Hitomi Kakizoe; June 7, 1963 (age 62) Tokyo, Japan
- Spouse: Yoshihiko Noda (m. 1992)
- Children: 2

Hitomi Noda is the spouse of Yoshihiko Noda and served as the spouse of the prime minister of Japan from 2011 to 2012.

== Personal life ==
She married Yoshihiko Noda in 1992 and she has two sons.

== Official Foreign Visits ==
- In 2012, she visited the United States as the spouse of the Japanese prime minister to attend the program Michelle Obama hosted.
- In 2011, she visited India on a state visit with her husband.

Unofficial roles
Preceded by Nobuko Kan	Spouse of the Prime Minister of Japan; 2011–2012	Succeeded by Akie Abe
