= Mikio Fujita =

Japanese politician

- 藤田 幹雄

Member of the House of Representatives
- In office 11 September 2005 – 16 November 2009
- Constituency: Southern Kanto PR

Personal details
- Born: 11 October 1968 (age 57) Tokyo, Japan
- Party: Liberal Democratic
- Relatives: Arata Takebe (brother-in-law)
- Education: Keio University (BSE)

Mikio Fujita (藤田 幹雄, Fujita Mikio; born 11 October 1968) is a former Japanese politician of the Liberal Democratic Party, who served as a member of the House of Representatives in the Diet (national legislature). A native of Tokyo and graduate of Keio University, he was elected to the House of Representatives for the first time in 2005. He represented the Southern Kanto proportional representation block from 2005 to 2009.
