= Sayuri Uenishi =

Japanese politician and tarento

- 上西 小百合

Member of the House of Representatives
- In office 21 December 2012 – 28 September 2017
- Constituency: Kinki PR

Personal details
- Born: 30 April 1983 (age 43) Habikino, Osaka, Japan
- Party: Independent
- Other political affiliations: JRP (2012–2014); JIP (2014–2016)
- Education: Kobe College

Sayuri Uenishi (上西 小百合) (born April 30, 1983) is a Japanese politician and tarento. She served two terms in the House of Representatives before being expelled from her party for skipping a Diet session, then getting caught in a couple of scandals.

== Early life and education ==
Uenishi was born in Habikino, Osaka on April 30, 1983. She studied at Kobe College. After graduation she worked for a few years for an insurance company and a beauty company before she became interested in politics in 2012.

== Career ==
Uenishi was elected to the House of Representatives during the 2012 Japanese general election. She represented the 4th district of Osaka, and was a member of the Japan Restoration Party. She then became a member of the Japan Innovation Party when the Japan Restoration party merged with them in 2015.

In 2015 Uenishi missed a session during which the Diet voted on the national budget. She said that she was ill, but went out to an izakaya with another lawmaker that night. Toru Hashimoto, one of the leaders of the Japan Innovation Party, expelled her after speaking with her about the matter. A few months later she was caught giving 800,000 yen in campaign funds to her father, who also served as her private secretary. In August 2015 she released an autobiography that included photographs of herself in suggestive poses.

Uenishi tweeted a rude message at the Urawa Red Diamonds soccer team for losing a match in 2017. Urawa fans then responded to her, starting a Twitter argument that culminated in death threats being sent to her office.

At a press conference on September 24, 2017 she announced that she would not run for office during the next election.

In 2018 she decided to become a tarento, and was hired by a production company. She appeared on Mecha-Mecha Iketeru! and London Hearts.
