= Chiba 14th district =

Electoral constituency in Chiba Prefecture, Japan

- Parliamentary constituency for the Japanese House of Representatives
- Numbered map of the Chiba Prefecture single seats
- Prefecture: Chiba
- Proportional District: Southern Kanto
- Electorate: 413,737

Current constituency
- Created: 2022
- Seats: One
- Party: CRA
- Representatives: Yoshihiko Noda
- Municipalities: Narashino and part of Funabashi

Chiba 14th district (千葉県第14区, Chiba-ken dai-ju-yonku or simply 千葉14区, Chiba-ju-yonku) is a single-member constituency of the House of Representatives in the national Diet of Japan located in Chiba Prefecture.

== Areas covered ==
=== Since 2022 ===
- Narashino
- Part of Funabashi

== List of representatives ==
Election	Representative	Party	Notes
2024	Yoshihiko Noda	CDP	
2026	Yoshihiko Noda	CRA	

== Election results ==
=== 2026 ===
2026
Party	Candidate	Votes	%	±%
Centrist Reform	Yoshihiko Noda	99,324	44.98	▼21.42
LDP	Harunobu Nagano (Won PR seat)	86,061	38.97	▲15.42
Sanseitō	Ai Nakamura	25,597	11.59	New
JCP	Kenta Yakama	9,831	4.45	▼0.79
Majority		13,263	6.01	
Registered electors		412,145		
Turnout			54.65	▲0.07
Centrist Reform hold				

=== 2024 ===
2024
Party	Candidate	Votes	%	±%
CDP	Yoshihiko Noda	145,821	66.40	New
LDP	Kyosuke Takahashi	51,723	23.55	New
JCP	Yosuke Sakai	11,505	5.24	New
Reiwa	Misao Redwolf	10,547	4.81	New
Majority		94,098	42.85	
Registered electors		412,495		
Turnout			54.58	
CDP win (new seat)				
