= Naoto Kan =

Prime Minister of Japan from 2010 to 2011

- 菅 直人
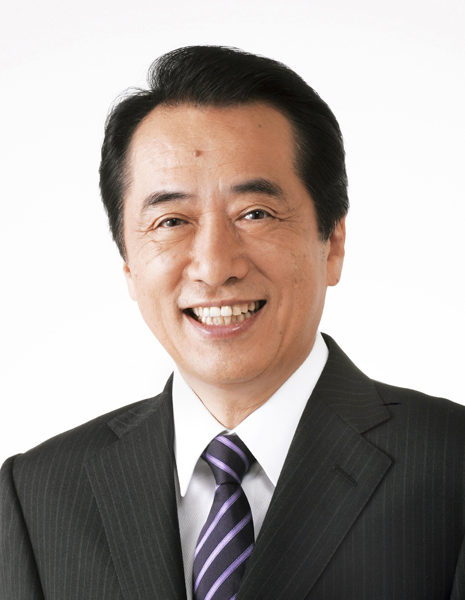
- Official portrait, 2010

Prime Minister of Japan
- In office 8 June 2010 – 2 September 2011
- Monarch: Akihito
- Preceded by: Yukio Hatoyama
- Succeeded by: Yoshihiko Noda

President of the Democratic Party of Japan
- In office 4 June 2010 – 29 August 2011
- Preceded by: Yukio Hatoyama
- Succeeded by: Yoshihiko Noda
- In office 10 December 2002 – 18 May 2004
- Preceded by: Yukio Hatoyama
- Succeeded by: Katsuya Okada
- In office 27 April 1998 – 25 September 1999
- Preceded by: Position established
- Succeeded by: Yukio Hatoyama

Deputy Prime Minister of Japan
- In office 16 September 2009 – 8 June 2010
- Prime Minister: Yukio Hatoyama
- Preceded by: Wataru Kubo (1996)
- Succeeded by: Katsuya Okada (2012)
Ministerial offices
Minister of Finance
In office 6 January 2010 – 8 June 2010
Prime Minister	Yukio Hatoyama
Preceded by	Hirohisa Fujii
Succeeded by	Yoshihiko Noda
Minister of State for Economic and Fiscal Policy
In office 16 September 2009 – 8 June 2010
Prime Minister	Yukio Hatoyama
Preceded by	Yoshimasa Hayashi
Succeeded by	Satoshi Arai
Minister of State in charge of National Strategy
In office 16 September 2009 – 6 January 2010
Prime Minister	Yukio Hatoyama
Preceded by	Position established
Succeeded by	Yoshito Sengoku
Minister of State for Science and Technology Policy
In office 16 September 2009 – 6 January 2010
Prime Minister	Yukio Hatoyama
Preceded by	Seiko Noda
Succeeded by	Tatsuo Kawabata
Minister of Health and Welfare
In office 11 January 1996 – 7 November 1996
Prime Minister	Ryutaro Hashimoto
Preceded by	Chūryō Morii
Succeeded by	Junichiro Koizumi

Member of the House of Representatives; from Tokyo
- In office 17 July 1980 – 9 October 2024
- Preceded by: Kiyoshi Ōno
- Succeeded by: Kaoru Fukuda
- Constituency: 7th district (1980–1996); 18th district (1996–2012); PR block (2012–2017); 18th district (2017–2024)

Personal details
- Born: 10 October 1946 (age 80) Ube, Yamaguchi, Empire of Japan
- Party: Constitutional Democratic (after 2017)
- Other political affiliations: Independent (before 1977); SCA (1977–1978); SDF (1978–1993); NPS (1993–1996); DP (1996–1998); DPJ (1998–2016); DP (2016–2017)
- Spouse: Nobuko Himei (m. 1970)
- Children: 2
- Education: Tokyo Institute of Technology
- Website: Official website
- Kan's voice Kan's New Year's press conference. Recorded 4 January 2011

Naoto Kan (菅 直人, Kan Naoto; born 10 October 1946) is a Japanese former politician who served as Prime Minister of Japan and President of the Democratic Party of Japan (DPJ) from June 2010 to September 2011.

Kan was the first Prime Minister since the resignation of Junichiro Koizumi in 2006 to serve for more than one year, with his predecessors Yukio Hatoyama, Tarō Asō, Yasuo Fukuda, and Shinzo Abe either resigning prematurely or losing an election. On 26 August 2011, Kan announced his resignation. Yoshihiko Noda was elected as his successor.

On 1 August 2012, United Nations Secretary-General Ban Ki-moon announced Kan would be one of the members of the UN high-level panel on the post-2015 development agenda.

Kan would announce his retirement from politics in November 2023. In February 2024 he would publish a memoir reflecting on his time in politics titled 'Fifty Years of Citizen Politics' (市民政治50年, Shimin Seiji 50-nen).

== Early life and education ==
Kan was born in Ube, Yamaguchi, the eldest son of Hisao Kan, the executive director of the glass manufacturing company Central Glass. He graduated in 1970 from the Tokyo Institute of Technology and became a licensed benrishi (patent agent/attorney) in 1971.

== Diet career ==
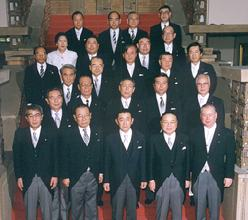
Kan with members of the First Hashimoto Cabinet at the Prime Minister's Official Residence on 11 January 1996.

After graduating from college, Kan worked at a patent office for four years. He actively engaged in civic grassroots movements for years and also served on election campaign staff for Fusae Ichikawa, a women's rights activist.

After having lost in the 1976 and 1979 general elections and 1977 Upper House election, Kan achieved a seat in the lower house in 1980 as a member of the Socialist Democratic Federation. He Later joined the New Party Sakigake. When the party was in coalition with the LDP, Kan was appointed Minister of Health and Welfare in the cabinet of Prime Minister Ryutaro Hashimoto in 1996. While serving in this position he gained national popularity for admitting the government's responsibility for the spread of HIV-tainted blood in the 1980s and directly apologized to victims. His frank action was completely unprecedented and was applauded by the media and the public.

In September of the same year, after having left cabinet, Kan founded the Democratic Party of Japan along with Yukio Hatoyama. In 1998, his image was affected by allegations of an affair, vigorously denied by both parties, with a television newscaster and media consultant, Yūko Tonomoto. After Hatoyama resigned as the leader of the Democratic Party of Japan, Kan again took over the position. In July 2003, the DPJ and the Liberal Party led by Ichirō Ozawa agreed to form a united opposition party to prepare for the general election that was anticipated to take place in the fall.

During the campaign of the election of 2003, the DPJ called the election as the choice of the government between the ruling LDP-bloc and the DPJ, with Kan being presented as the alternative candidate to then Prime Minister Junichiro Koizumi. His face was used as the trademark of the campaign against the LDP.

However, in 2004 Kan was accused of unpaid annuities and again resigned the position of leader. On 10 May 2004, he officially announced his resignation and made the Shikoku Pilgrimage. Later, the Ministry of Health, Labour and Welfare spokesman apologized, saying the unpaid record was due to an administrative error.

In mid-October 2005, Kan, who turned 60 in 2006, proposed the creation of a new political party to be called the "Dankai (baby boomer) Party". The initial intent of the party was to offer places of activity for the Japanese baby boomers – 2.7 million of whom began to retire en masse in 2007.

Kan believes the Japan Self-Defense Forces should play a more prominent role on the international stage.

=== Finance Minister (2010) ===
On 6 January 2010, he was picked by Yukio Hatoyama to be the new finance minister, assuming the post in addition to deputy prime minister. He replaced Hirohisa Fujii as finance minister.

In his first news conference, Kan announced his priority was stimulating growth and took the unusual step of naming a specific dollar-yen level as optimal to help exporters and stimulate the economy: "There are a lot of voices in the business world saying that (the dollar) around ¥95 is appropriate in terms of trade". Hatoyama appeared to rebuke Kan. "When it comes to foreign exchange, stability is desirable and rapid moves are undesirable. The government basically shouldn't comment on foreign exchange," he told reporters.

== Prime Minister (2010–2011) ==
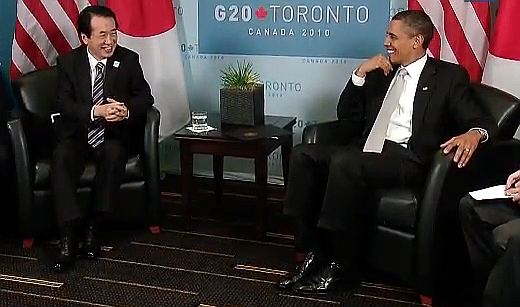
Kan with U.S. president Barack Obama at the 2010 G-20 Toronto summit on 27 June 2010

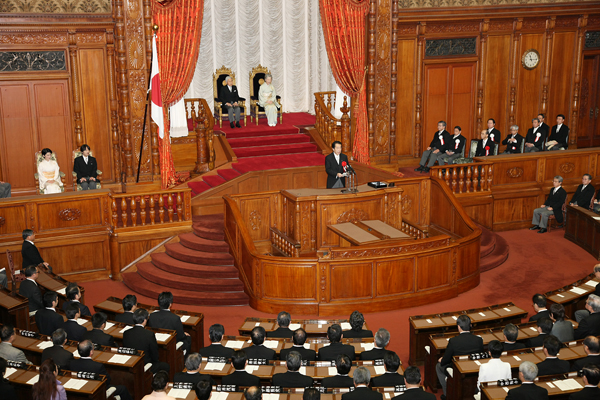
Prime Minister Kan giving the government's speech in front of the assembled lawmakers, in the presence of the Emperor Akihito and the Empress Michiko seated in the Chamber of the House of Councillors of the National Diet (29 November 2010)

On 2 June 2010, Yukio Hatoyama announced his intention to resign as the leader of the Democratic Party of Japan (DPJ) and as prime minister, also saying that he had urged his backer in the party, Ichirō Ozawa, to resign as secretary general. The Cabinet resigned en masse on 4 June. Foreign Minister Katsuya Okada and Land and Transport Minister Seiji Maehara, though once considered to be possible successors to Hatoyama, announced their support for Kan. Kan, at the age of 63, won the leadership of the DPJ with 291 votes to 129, defeating a relatively unknown Ozawa-backed legislator Shinji Tarutoko, 50, who was leading the environmental policy committee in the lower house of the Diet.

Subsequently, on 4 June, Kan was designated prime minister by the Diet. On 8 June, Emperor Akihito formally appointed Kan as the 94th Prime Minister, and the 29th postwar prime minister. His cabinet was formed later on the day.

Kan's approval ratings fell in the month of June after he proposed an increase in the sales tax rate from 5% to 10%. His sales tax increase proposal was opposed by Ichirō Ozawa, amongst others in the DPJ, and the proposal was quickly scaled back by Kan. The botched sales tax increase proposal was partially blamed for the DPJ's disappointing results in the July House of Councillors election, where the DPJ lost its majority and was forced to work with smaller, unaffiliated parties (such as Your Party, the JCP, and the SDP) in order to secure passage of bills in the House of Councillors.

Ozawa challenged Kan's leadership of the DPJ in September. Although it was initially believed that Ozawa had a slight edge among DPJ members of parliament, in the final vote Kan garnered the support of 206 DPJ lawmakers to Ozawa's 200. Local rank-and-file party members and activists overwhelmingly supported Kan, and according to opinion polls the wider Japanese public preferred Kan to Ozawa by as much as a 4:1 ratio.

After the leadership challenge, Kan reshuffled his cabinet, which left many prominent members of the pro-Ozawa faction of the DPJ without important posts in the new cabinet. The cabinet reshuffle also resulted in the promotion of long-time Kan ally Yoshito Sengoku to Chief Cabinet Secretary. Sengoku was labeled by the opposition LDP as the "second" Prime Minister of the Kan cabinet.

=== Foreign policy ===
On 7 September, a Chinese fishing boat captain was arrested by the Japan Coast Guard (JCG) after his trawler had collided with JCG patrol boats in disputed waters near the Senkaku Islands. China protested the arrest, as it claims the islands as part of its sovereign territory, and demanded the unconditional release of the captain. The captain was released on 24 September, after China had cut off all ministerial-level contacts with Japan and threatened further action. The incident brought Sino-Japanese relations to its lowest point since the Koizumi administration.

The Kan government intervened in mid-September to weaken the surging yen by buying U.S. dollars, a move which temporarily relieved Japan's exporters. The move proved popular with stock brokers, Japanese exporters, and the Japanese public. It was the first such move by a Japanese government since 2004. Later, in October, after the yen had offset the intervention and had reached a 15-year high, the Kan cabinet approved a stimulus package worth about 5.1 trillion yen ($62 billion) in order to weaken the yen and fight deflation.

In November, Kan spoke out forcefully in support of South Korea and in harsh criticism of North Korea in the wake of the latter's bombardment of Yeonpyeong, meanwhile ignoring China's public comments which had not yet included denunciation of the North.

=== Fukushima nuclear accident response ===
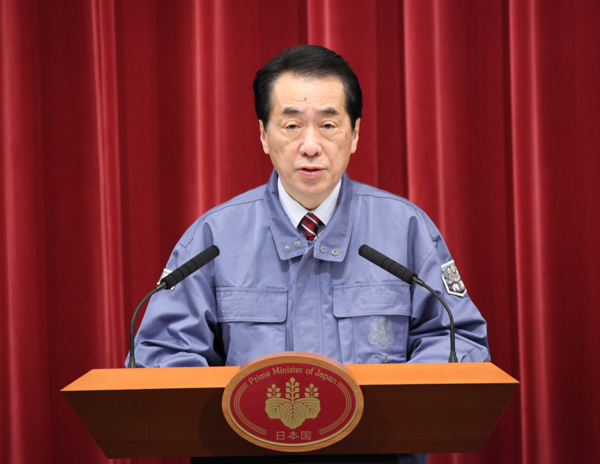
Kan giving a press conference on the day of the Fukushima nuclear accident.

After the earthquake and tsunami in northeastern Japan on the afternoon of March 11, 2011, Kan flew by helicopter to the Fukushima I Nuclear Power Plant early the next morning, and was thereafter heavily involved in efforts to effectively respond to the Fukushima nuclear accident.

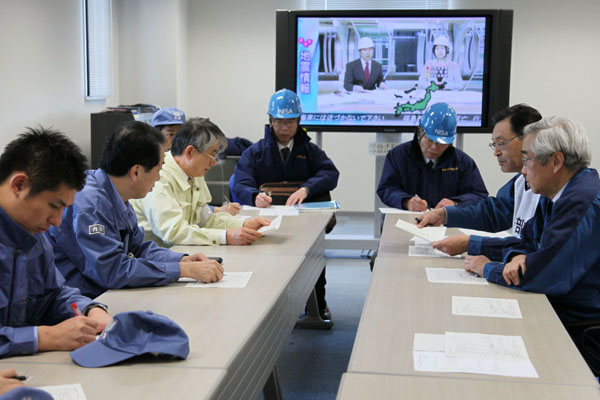
Kan's meeting with TEPCO officials at Fukushima Daiichi Nuclear Power Plant the morning after the 2011 Tōhoku earthquake and tsunami.

Venting from the Fukushima plant began on the morning of 12 March, shortly after Kan's meeting with Tokyo Electric Power Company (TEPCO) management at the plant, and that afternoon the plant suffered its first explosion. That evening, following an order from METI Minister Kaieda to begin pumping seawater into the plant for emergency cooling purposes, Kan expressed concern that the seawater injection plan may lead to re-criticality, in response to which TEPCO directed plant manager Masao Yoshida to stop pumping (an order which Yoshida tacitly ignored). After further briefings on the issue, Kan directed pumping to continue later that evening. Several weeks later, Shinzo Abe circulated information that Kan had ordered pumping to stop, which the Yomiuri Shimbun and other news outlets reported as fact, and opposition leader Sadakazu Tanigaki accused the government of causing the Fukushima meltdowns.

Early in the morning of 15 March, amid rumors that TEPCO intended to abandon the plant and allow a full meltdown that would potentially trigger an evacuation of the entire Kanto region, Kan ordered the establishment of a joint response headquarters between the government and TEPCO, and personally traveled to TEPCO headquarters on half an hour's notice. While this move initially antagonized TEPCO, it was later positively evaluated as improving communications between the plant operator and government agencies such as the Self-Defense Forces and Tokyo Fire Department.

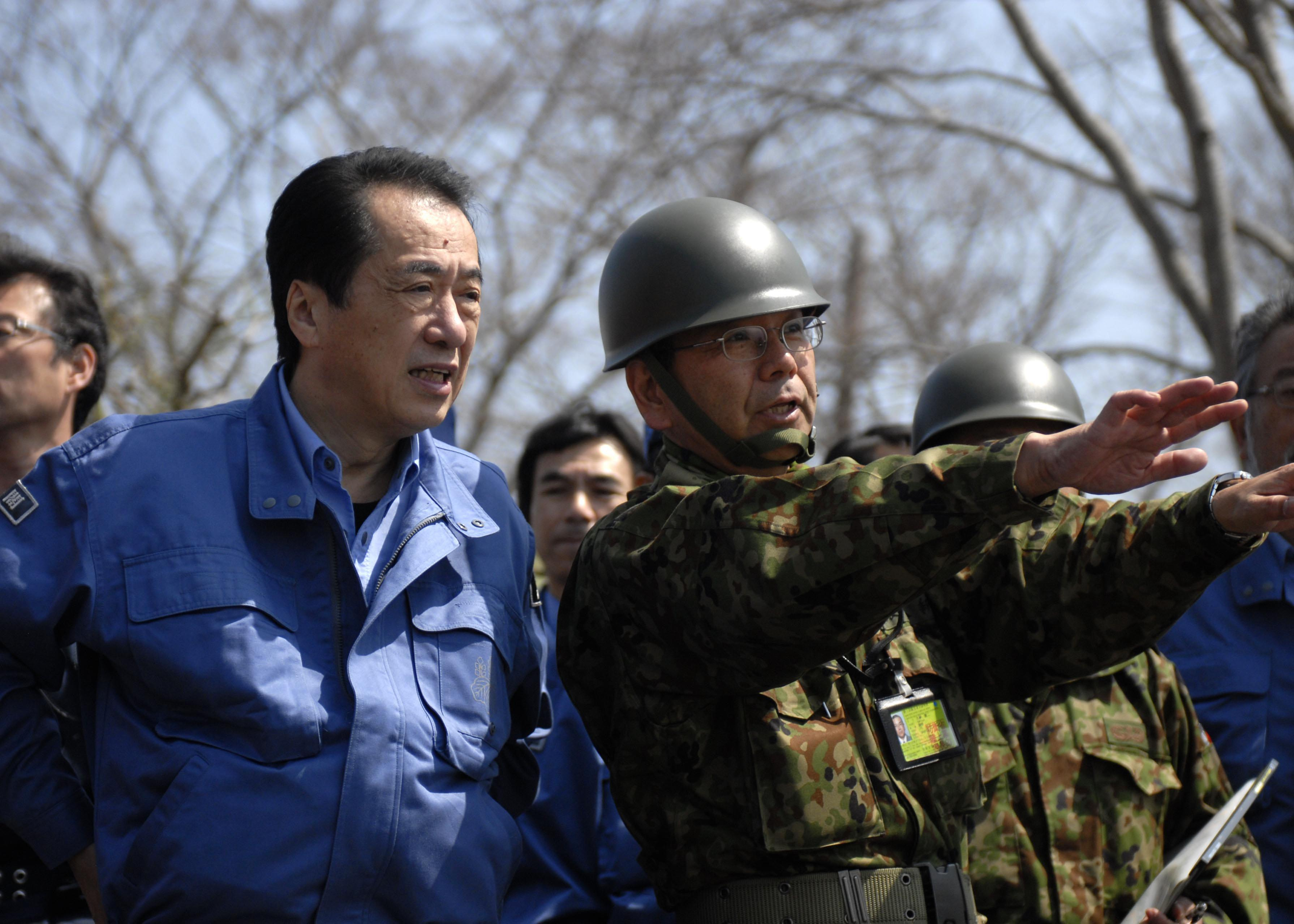
Kan inspects Ishinomaki, one month after the Great East Japan earthquake.

Kan took an increasingly anti-nuclear stance in the months following the Fukushima disaster. In May, he ordered that the aging Hamaoka Nuclear Power Plant be closed over earthquake and tsunami fears, and he said he would freeze plans to build new reactors.

Despite falling popularity, Kan rejected calls to step down while the country continued to suffer from the earthquake, tsunami, and nuclear crises of spring 2011. One year into his premiership on 2 June 2011, Kan proposed his resignation, hours before the Diet put forward a vote of no-confidence. The motion was defeated by 293 to 152, bolstering the Prime Minister's position.

In July 2011, Kan said that Japan must reduce its dependence on nuclear energy, breaking with a decades-old Japanese government drive to build more nuclear power plants in the country. "We must scrap the plan to have nuclear power contribute 53 percent (of electricity supply) by 2030 and reduce the degree of reliance on nuclear power," Kan told a government panel. Kan said Japan should abandon plans to build 14 new reactors by 2030. He wants to "pass a bill to promote renewable energy and questioned whether private companies should be running atomic plants". In August, Kan removed three of Japan's top nuclear energy officials in effort to break ties between government and the atomic industry.

When interviewed in 2012, after resigning as prime minister, Kan said the Fukushima accident made it clear to him that "Japan needs to dramatically reduce its dependence on nuclear power, which supplied 30 percent of its electricity before the crisis, and has turned him into a believer of renewable energy." He said that at one point Japan faced a situation where there was a chance that people might not be able to live in the capital zone including Tokyo and would have to evacuate, and that he was haunted by the specter of an even bigger nuclear crisis forcing tens of millions of people to flee Tokyo and threatening the nation's existence. "If things had reached that level, not only would the public have had to face hardships but Japan's very existence would have been in peril". That convinced Kan to "declare the need for Japan to end its reliance on atomic power and promote renewable sources of energy such solar [sic] that have long taken a back seat in the resource-poor country's energy mix". He told a parliamentary investigation in 2012 that the nuclear industry had "shown no remorse" for the disaster, and was trying to push Japan back to nuclear power.

=== Resignation ===
Kan announced his intention to resign on 10 August 2011. On 26 August, with passage of a debt bill and the renewable energy bill as final conditions, Kan expected "to see his successor in office [within the] week, according to a Kyodo news report, which cited cabinet ministers". At the same time, Seiji Maehara, who had supported Kan in 2010, was reported to have announced his intention to run to succeed Kan. Maehara was seen as the potential DPJ candidate most popular with the voters at the time, but several other cabinet members joined the race, and the election of the DPJ successor was scheduled for 29 August. At that time, Yoshihiko Noda, most recently finance minister, was elected as the new DPJ leader and, as leader of the largest party in the Diet, became prime minister as well.

== Post-premiership ==
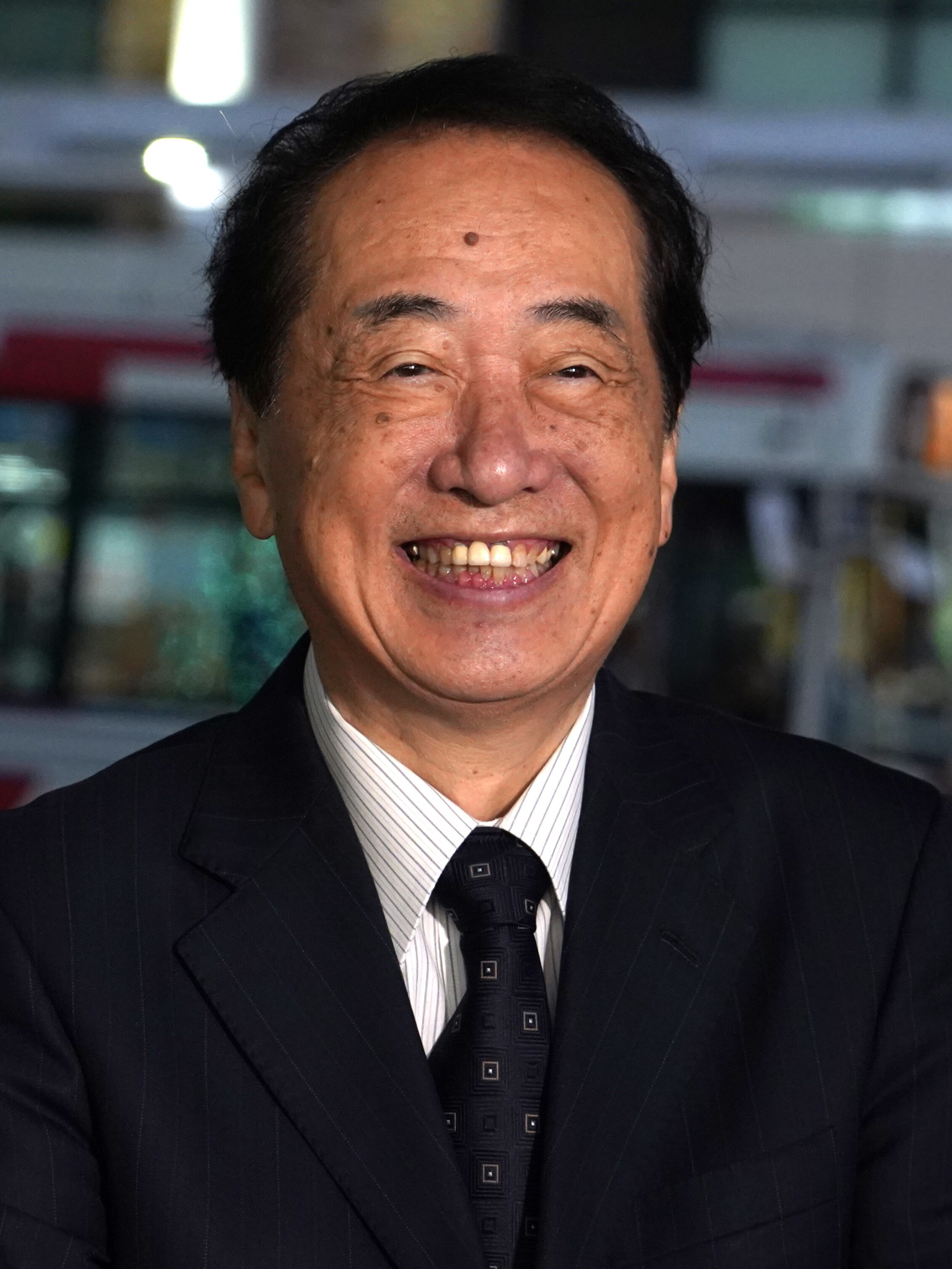
Kan in 2024

During 16 December 2012 Tokyo gubernatorial election, called due to the resignation of incumbent Governor Shintaro Ishihara, the Democratic Party of Japan itself did not endorse any candidate, but Kan supported Kenji Utsunomiya (leftist lawyer), who shared Kan's anti-nuclear stance. Ultimately Utsunomiya came second in the election, losing to Naoki Inose who had been vice-governor under Ishihara from 2007 to 2012, and then acting governor after Ishihara's abrupt resignation.

In the 2012 general election called by Kan's successor Noda, Kan lost his seat in the Tokyo 18th district, but retained a seat in the diet through the proportional representation system. In the 2014 general election, Kan lost his district seat but was again elected through the proportional block. He joined the Constitutional Democratic Party of Japan along with the liberal-leaning members of the Democratic Party following the party split prior to the 2017 general election. In the election, he regained his district seat, defeating the LDP incumbent Masatada Tsuchiya with a margin of 1,046 votes.

In 2023, Kan stated publicly he would not run for a seat in the House of Representatives again. He further said that he would "still probably be involved in politics someway". His term ended when the House was dissolved in October 2024.

On 26 February 2024, Kan published the memoir 'Fifty Years of Citizen Politics' through Chikuma Shobō detailing his life in politics. On 20 March 2024, Japan Business Press published an interview with Kan to promote the memoir. Kan stated in the interview that he was helped in assembling the book by former mayor of Musashino Reiko Matsushito.

It was announced in January 2026 that Kan had developed dementia. A journalist who went to his house and interviewed Kan reported that he had “no recollection of the 2011 earthquake.”

== Personal life ==
Kan married his wife Nobuko in 1970. Nobuko, born in Okayama Prefecture, entered a relationship with the Tokyo-dwelling Kan after entering Tsuda College. As the two are first cousins, the engagement was met with parental opposition. They have two sons, Gentarō and Shinjirō. Gentarō is a social activist and ran unsuccessfully for the House of Representatives in 2003 and 2005. He later served as political secretary to his father and was elected to the Musashino City Council in December 2023. Shinjiro is a veterinarian and works at an animal hospital in Nerima, Tokyo.

Kan is nicknamed "Ira-Kan" (Fretful Kan") due to his reputed short temper. His hobbies were go, shogi and origami. Kan built a machine to calculate the complicated mahjong point system and applied for a patent in 1973.

== In media ==
Kan was portrayed by Shirō Sano in the 2020 film Fukushima 50, and by Fumiyo Kohinata in the 2023 Netflix series The Days (in which his name was changed to Shinji Azuma). Both works portray Kan's role in the Fukushima crisis from a highly critical perspective.

The docu-drama The Seal of the Sun (2016, 90 min.), directed by Futoshi Sato, produced by Kaori Otsuka and executive produced by Tamiyoshi Tachibana, shows how the Prime Minister's office and the field struggled following the five days after the Fukushima nuclear accident. The film delves into the 3.11 Tohoku earthquake/Fukushima disaster from Prime Minister Naoto Kan and his cabinet's perspective. In this interview, executive producer Tachibana discusses why he created the film:

At the time, I was simply a friend, one of his cadets in politics. It was only after the earthquake that I became a real member of his support group. It is not to reproduce the experience of the crisis experienced by Naoto Kan that I produced this film. The media and public opinion, manipulated by the latter, were totally hostile to the Prime Minister, accusing him of having aggravated the accident and amplified the damage. Faced with this rejection, I was plagued by anger and disgust as they led me to make this film to put things in order.

The reactors' accident could, in the worst case, have caused the evacuation of the entire population living within a radius of 250km, including Tokyo, a total of 50 million people. Naoto Kan was the only one to have guessed the extreme gravity of the accident and to have realized that we were one step away from the collapse of Japan. If he had not been Prime Minister, if the crisis had to be managed by another in his place, the country could have been completely destroyed.

Naoto Kan has an important cameo appearance in the 2023 Documentary Film SOS: The San Onofre Syndrome directed by James Heddle, Mary Beth Brangan and Morgan Peterson. On a recent interview producer Mary Beth Brangan stated that it was the Fukushima accident what set her and her life partner James Heddle into the making of that film. The film documents a very special visit prime minister Naoto Kan paid on June 4, 2013 to San Diego to participate in a panel entitled "Fukushima: Ongoing Lessons for California" next to Nuclear Regulatory Commission chair Gregory Jaczko, former NRC Commissioner Peter A. Bradford, and nuclear engineer Arnie Gundersen, where they discussed nuclear power's risks. In his concluding statement Prime Minister Kan stated:

"After Fukushima, my whole mindset about nuclear power has changed 180 degrees... I began to think there is only one way to deal with this risk.... I realized, we need a society that has no nuclear power."

Political offices
Preceded by Chūryō Morii	Minister of Health and Welfare; 1996	Succeeded by Junichiro Koizumi
Preceded by Wataru Kubo	Deputy Prime Minister of Japan; 2009–2010	Succeeded by Katsuya Okada
Preceded by Yoshimasa Hayashi	Minister of State for Economic and Fiscal Policy; 2009–2010	Succeeded by Satoshi Arai
New title	Minister of State in charge of National Strategy; 2009–2010	Succeeded by Yoshito Sengoku
Preceded by Seiko Noda	Minister of State for Science and Technology Policy; 2009–2010	Succeeded by Tatsuo Kawabata
Preceded by Hirohisa Fujii	Minister of Finance; 2010	Succeeded by Yoshihiko Noda
Preceded by Yukio Hatoyama	Prime Minister of Japan; 2010–2011	Succeeded by Yoshihiko Noda
Party political offices
New political party	Leader of the Democratic Party; 1996–1997; Served alongside: Yukio Hatoyama	Succeeded by Himself
Preceded by Yukio Hatoyama	Leader of the Democratic Party; 1997–1998	Succeeded by Himself
New political party	President of the Democratic Party; 1998–1999	Succeeded by Katsuya Okada
Preceded by Tsutomu Hata	Secretary General of the Democratic Party; 2000–2002	Succeeded by Kansei Nakano
Preceded by Yukio Hatoyama	President of the Democratic Party; 2002–2004	Succeeded by Katsuya Okada
Preceded by Yukio Hatoyama	President of the Democratic Party; 2010–2011	Succeeded by Yoshihiko Noda
Diplomatic posts
Preceded by Lee Hsien Loong	Chairperson of APEC; 2010	Succeeded by Barack Obama
