= Yoshihiko Noda =

Prime Minister of Japan from 2011 to 2012

- 野田 佳彦
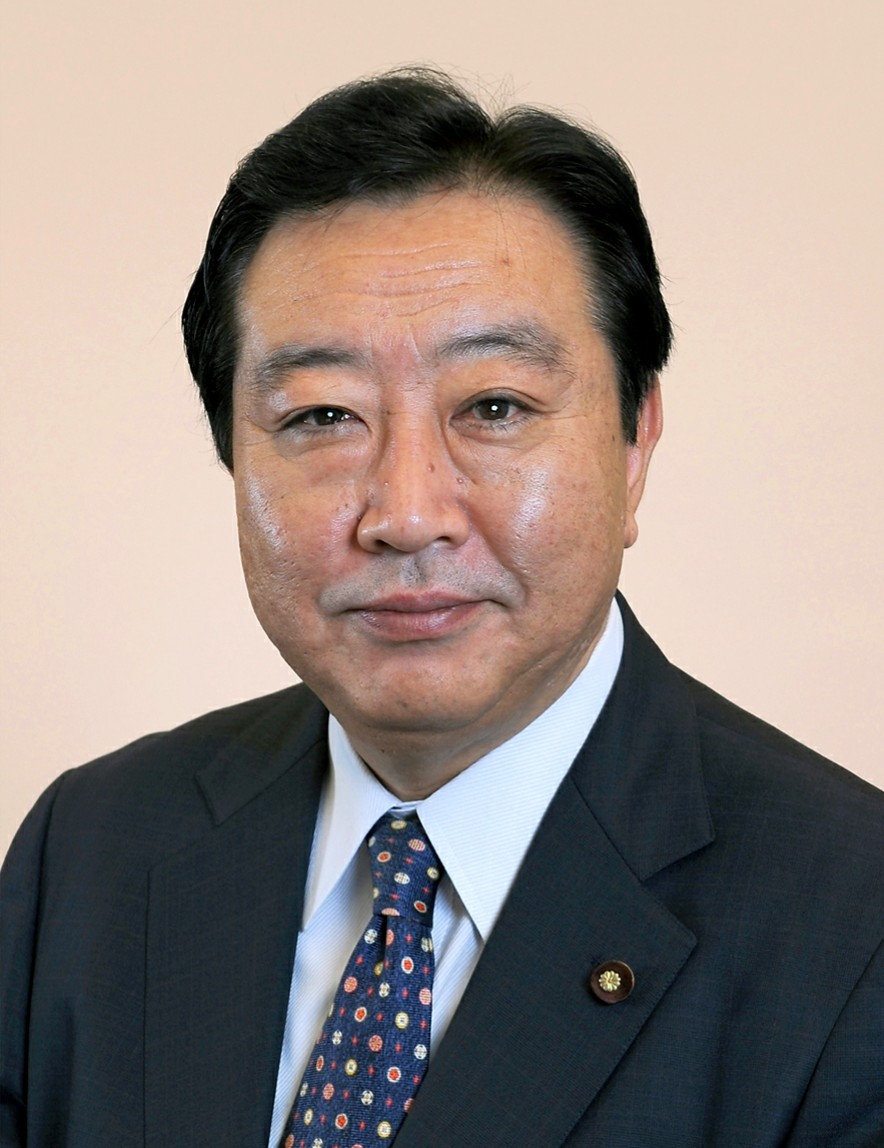
- Official portrait, 2011

Prime Minister of Japan
- In office 2 September 2011 – 26 December 2012
- Monarch: Akihito
- Deputy: Katsuya Okada (Note: From 13 January to 26 December 2012)
- Preceded by: Naoto Kan
- Succeeded by: Shinzo Abe
Ministerial offices
Minister of Finance
In office 8 June 2010 – 2 September 2011
Prime Minister	Naoto Kan
Preceded by	Naoto Kan
Succeeded by	Jun Azumi
Senior Vice Minister of Finance
In office 16 September 2009 – 8 June 2010 Serving with Naoki Minezaki
Minister	Hirohisa Fujii; Naoto Kan
Preceded by	Wataru Takeshita; Masatoshi Ishida
Succeeded by	Motohisa Ikeda; Naoki Minezaki
Party political offices
Co-president of the Centrist Reform Alliance
In office 15 January 2026 – 13 February 2026 Serving with Tetsuo Saito
Preceded by	Office established
Succeeded by	Junya Ogawa
President of the Constitutional Democratic Party
In office 23 September 2024 – 19 January 2026
Preceded by	Kenta Izumi
Succeeded by	Shunichi Mizuoka
Secretary-General of the Democratic Party
In office September 2016 – September 2017
President	Renhō
Preceded by	Yukio Edano
Succeeded by	Atsushi Oshima
President of the Democratic Party of Japan
In office 29 August 2011 – 25 December 2012
Preceded by	Naoto Kan
Succeeded by	Banri Kaieda

Member of the House of Representatives
- Incumbent
- Assumed office 26 June 2000
- Preceded by: Shōichi Tanaka
- Constituency: Chiba 4th (2000–2024); Chiba 14th (2024–present)
- In office 19 July 1993 – 27 September 1996
- Preceded by: Kazuo Eguchi
- Succeeded by: Constituency abolished
- Constituency: Chiba 1st

Member of the Chiba Prefectural Assembly
- In office 23 April 1987 – 5 July 1993
- Constituency: Funabashi City

Personal details
- Born: 20 May 1957 (age 69) Funabashi, Chiba, Japan
- Party: DRP (since 2026)
- Other political affiliations: JNP (1992–1994); NFP (1994–1997); DPJ (1998–2016); DP (2016–2018); Independent (2018–2020); Group of Independents (2018–2019); Social Security (2019); CDP (2020–2026); CRA (2026)
- Spouse: Hitomi Kakizoe (m. 1992)
- Children: 2
- Education: Waseda University (BA)
- Website: Government website
- Noda's voice Noda delivers remarks after being appointed Prime Minister of Japan. Recorded 2 September 2011

Yoshihiko Noda (Japanese: 野田 佳彦, Hepburn: Noda Yoshihiko; born 20 May 1957) is a Japanese politician who served as the Prime Minister of Japan from 2011 to 2012. He has been a member of the House of Representatives since 2000.

Noda entered politics in 1993 as a member of the now-defunct Japan New Party. In 1996, he joined the Democratic Party of Japan (DPJ). After the DPJ won control of the Diet in 2009 general election, Noda was named a senior vice minister of finance in the cabinet of Prime Minister Yukio Hatoyama, and in 2010, was named minister of finance in the cabinet of Prime Minister Naoto Kan. Following Kan's resignation as prime minister, Noda won the ensuing leadership election and was appointed prime minister on 2 September 2011.

Following a severe loss for the DPJ in the December 2012 general election, Noda announced his resignation as party leader, triggering a leadership election that was won by Banri Kaieda. Noda was succeeded as Prime Minister by Shinzo Abe, President of the Liberal Democratic Party, on 26 December 2012.

As the DPJ underwent mergers and reorganizations, Noda left to sit as an independent politician. In 2021, Noda joined the CDP, the primary successor to the DPJ. In 2024, Noda successfully stood for the CDP's party presidential election, defeating incumbent leader Kenta Izumi and former leader Yukio Edano. Weeks after assuming the presidency of the party, the 2024 general election was announced, with the CDP achieving its best result in party history, and the ruling LDP coalition being limited to a minority. After a rout in the 2026 general election, Noda resigned as co-president of the newly-formed Centrist Reform Alliance.

== Early life ==
Noda was born in Funabashi on 20 May 1957, the son of a paratrooper in the Japan Self-Defense Forces. Unlike many prominent Japanese politicians, Noda has no family connections to Nagatachō. His parents were too poor to pay for a wedding reception.

Noda graduated from Chiba Prefectural Funabashi Senior High School in 1975. He graduated from Waseda University with the B.A. degree in Political Science in 1980 and was later accepted into the Matsushita Institute. This institution was founded by Kōnosuke Matsushita (the founder of Panasonic) to groom future civic leaders of Japan. While attending the Matsushita Institute, Noda read household gas meters as a part-time job in his native Chiba Prefecture, partially in order to get to know his future constituents better in preparation for a run for office. He was first elected to the assembly of Chiba Prefecture in 1987 at the age of 29.

== Diet career ==
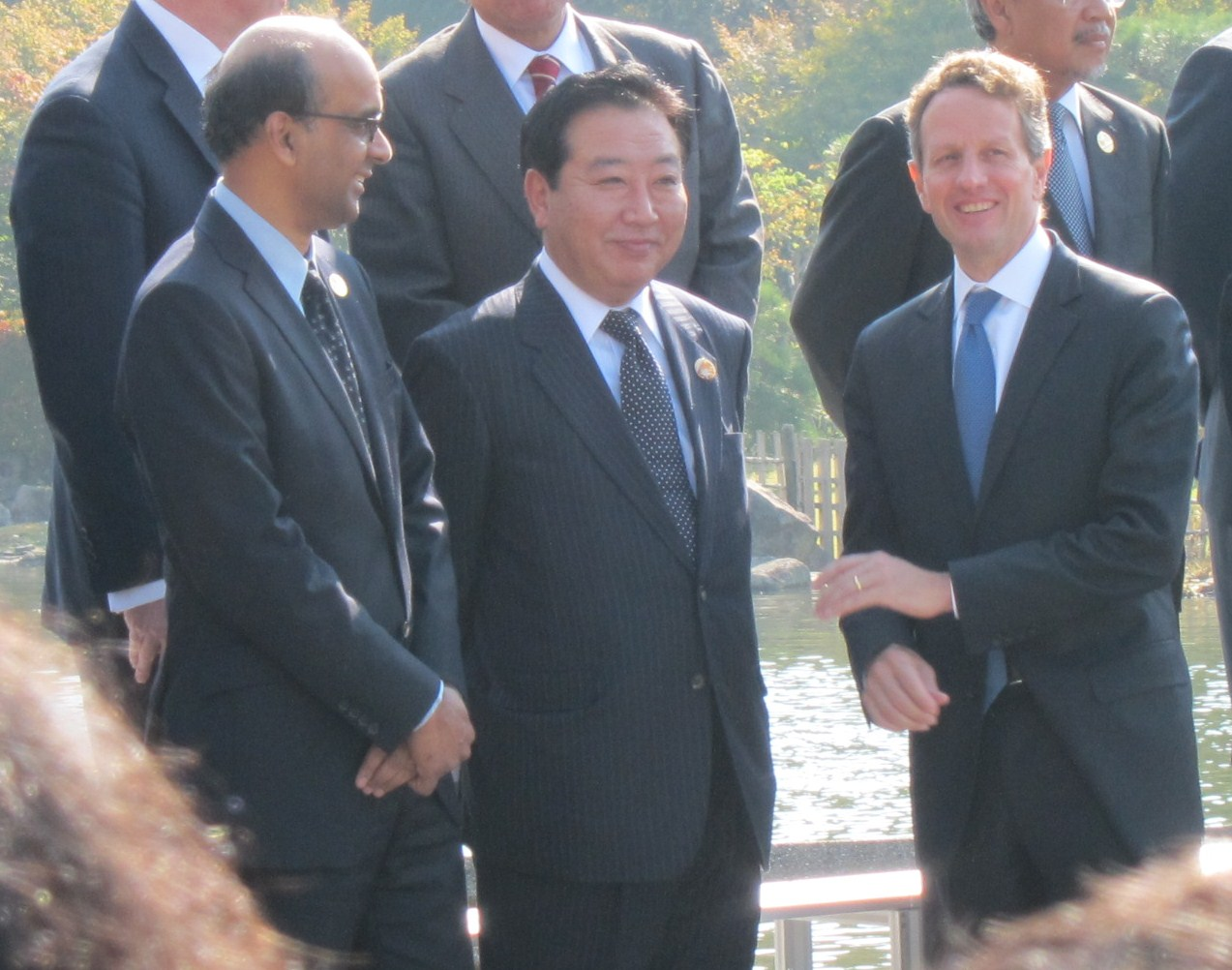
Noda with Singapore Finance Minister Tharman Shanmugaratnam and U.S. Treasury Secretary Timothy Geithner

In 1993, he was elected to the Diet for the first time, as one of four members of Chiba 1st district as a member of the now-defunct Japan New Party. After the multi-member districts were abolished in the 1994 Japanese electoral reform, Noda stood in Chiba 4th district in the 1996 election, but was defeated. He later joined the Democratic Party of Japan (DPJ) and successfully contested Chiba 4th in the 2000 election. As a member of the DPJ, he served as its Diet affairs chief as well as head of the party's public relations office.

In October 2005, Noda criticized Prime Minister Jun'ichirō Koizumi for his position on Japanese class A war criminals as "war criminals". However, Noda supported Koizumi's visit to Yasukuni Shrine.

Noda acted as senior vice finance minister during the premiership of Yukio Hatoyama after the DPJ won control of the Diet in 2009 general election, and was appointed as Minister of Finance by Prime Minister Naoto Kan in June 2010. He was known as a reformist and had led a DPJ intraparty group critical of ex-DPJ powerbroker Ichirō Ozawa. Upon assuming the post of finance minister, Noda, a fiscal conservative, expressed his determination to slash Japan's deficit and rein in gross public debt. In January 2011, for the first time in six years, the finance ministry intervened in the foreign exchange market and spent 2.13 trillion yen to purchase dollars in order to rein in the yen's spiraling appreciation.

== Prime Minister (2011–2012) ==
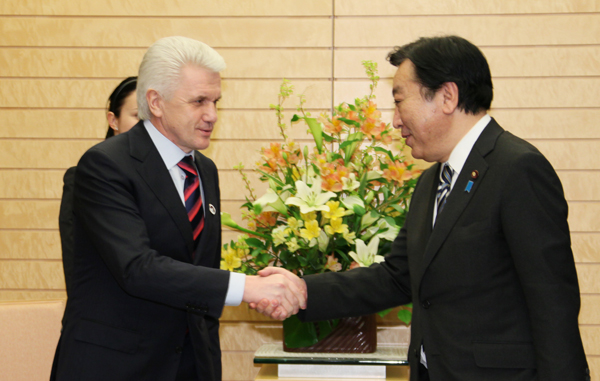
Noda with Volodymyr Lytvyn, Chairman of the Verkhovna Rada (March 9, 2012)

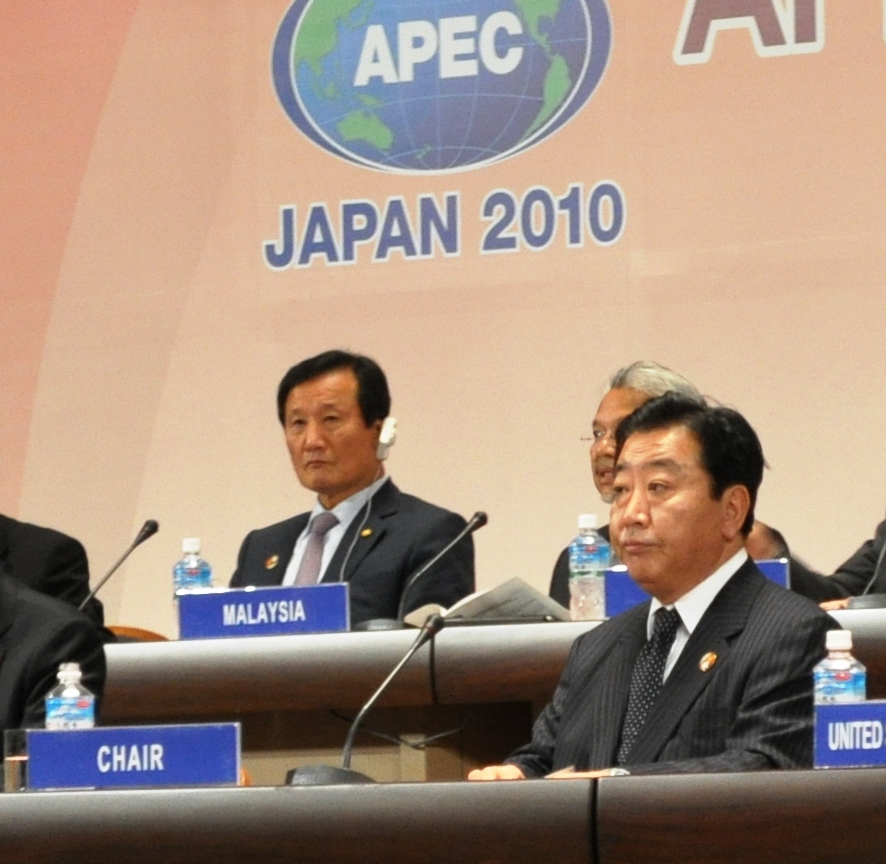
Noda at the 2010 APEC Finance Summit

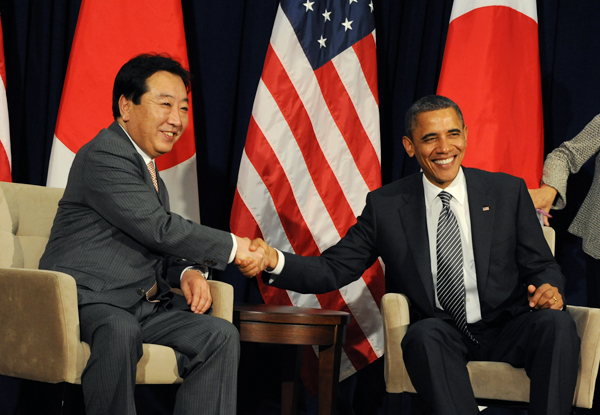
Noda with U.S. President Barack Obama

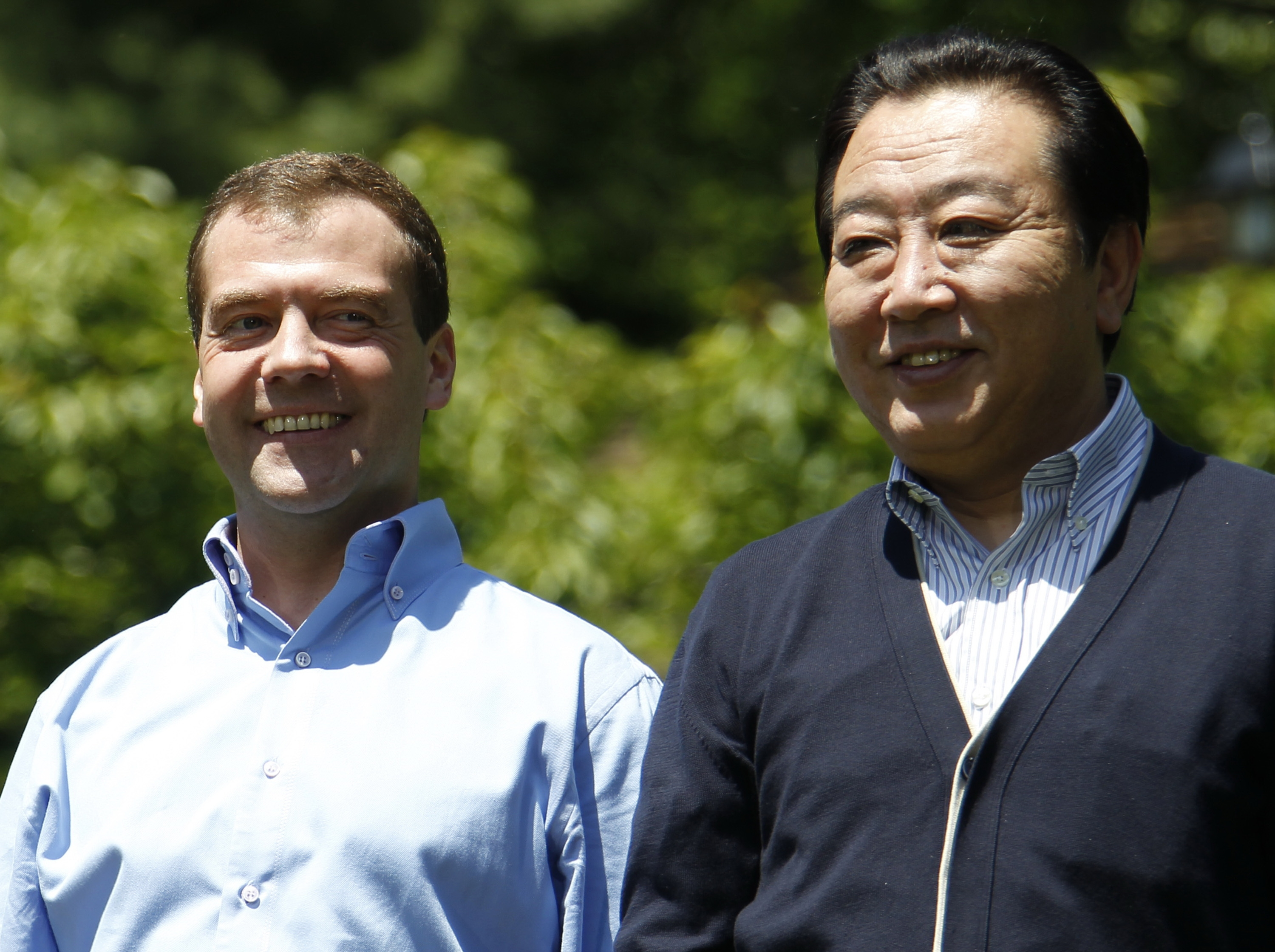
Noda with Prime Minister of Russia Dmitry Medvedev

After Naoto Kan's resignation in August 2011, Noda stood as a candidate in the party election to replace him. He won a runoff vote against Banri Kaieda in the leadership election, making him the presumptive prime minister. He inherited the challenge of the 2011 Tōhoku earthquake and tsunami reconstruction plans.

During the party caucus making the leadership decision, Noda made a 15-minute speech in which he summarized his political career by comparing himself to dojo loach, a kind of bottom-feeding fish. Paraphrasing a poem by Mitsuo Aida, he said, "I'll never be a goldfish in a scarlet robe, but like a loach in muddy waters. I'll work hard for the people, to move politics forward." The "loach speech" was popular among his colleagues and cemented his political reputation at the start of his term.

=== Nuclear policy ===
In his first speech as Prime Minister on 2 September 2011, Noda confirmed that the Japanese government would continue to phase out nuclear power, by not building new nuclear power plants nor extending the life spans of outdated ones. In May 2012, nuclear power plants which were sitting idle in the wake of the Fukushima accident were restarted in order to help Japan's immediate demands for energy, despite protests including hundreds of people.

=== Foreign policy ===
Noda told his foreign policy and was said to have close relations with the United States, and stressed the importance of the US-Japan security alliance in August 2011 speech. On 15 August 2011 —the anniversary of the Surrender of Japan in World War II, he said that Japan's class A war criminals convicted by the Allies were not legally war criminals under his view. As prime minister of Japan, he stated that his position on this issue would follow the standard set by previous administrations, and that he did not wish to alter close relationship with China and South Korea.

==== Participation in Trans-Pacific Partnership negotiations ====
During premiership of Noda, one of his most important initiatives was pursuing the entry of Japan into the negotiations for the Trans-Pacific Partnership, which he announced on 11 November 2011. This proved controversial and was widely discussed in Japanese society.

==== Senkaku Islands ====
The Tokyo Metropolitan Government under Governor Shintaro Ishihara sought to buy the Senkaku Islands, which are claimed by China and Taiwan. Ishihara wished to build facilities on the islands to more obviously claim them as Japanese territory, a move which the national government under Noda regarded as likely to exacerbate tensions with China. On 27 April 2012 the Tokyo government began raising funds from the public to purchase the islands. By September 2012 1.4 billion yen ($17.8 million) had been raised.

On 24 August, Noda went on live television and vowed to appeal to the international community to support Japan's claims to sovereignty over islands at the center of separate disputes with South Korea and China. On 11 September, the Japanese government nationalized its control over Minami-kojima, Kita-kojima, and Uotsuri islands by purchasing them from the Kurihara family for ¥2.05 billion. China's Foreign Ministry objected saying Beijing would not "sit back and watch its territorial sovereignty violated."

=== Consumption tax increase ===
Another major priority of Noda's was his effort to increase Japan's consumption tax from 5% to 10%. During this struggle, Noda said that he "staked his political life" on the passage of the law. The bill passed through the lower house of the diet on 26 June 2012, and passed the upper house on 10 August 2012. On 10 August 2012, Noda survived a no-confidence vote after proposing a five-percent increase in the sales tax. During negotiations for the tax, Noda promised to call an early election "soon". Afterwards, he stated that he had planned to quit as a lawmaker if he had been unable to pass the consumption tax increase.

Noda received praise for passing the consumption tax hike despite intense opposition, but was also criticized for bringing the DPJ closer in substance to its rival LDP, rather than keeping the campaign promises by which it defeated the LDP in 2009. One commentator called him "the best prime minister the LDP never had."

=== Defeat in the 2012 general election ===
On 21 September 2012, Noda won the DPJ's leadership bi-annual election by 818 points out of 1,231. He then said: "I would like to beef up our teamwork so that we can shift the DPJ once again to make it a fighting force that can serve Japan. [I promise to] sweat with all of you to make a vigorous Japan together. The real reform Japan needs is decisive politics when we face issues that need to be decided." His result was seen as more certain after Environment Minister Goshi Hosono stepped back from standing in the election. He defeated former agriculture ministers Michihiko Kano and Hirotaka Akamatsu, as well as former internal affairs minister Kazuhiro Haraguchi.

On 14 November 2012, Noda stated that the diet would be dissolved on 16 November 2012, and the election would be held on 16 December 2012. Given the DPJ's poor figures in the polls, many members of the DPJ were opposed to this, including General Secretary Azuma Koshiishi, and there was talk among some DPJ members of trying to oust Noda before the next election.

The DPJ managed to narrow its polling gap with the LDP prior to the start of the election campaign in December, raising hopes that the DPJ could prevent the LDP from obtaining an outright majority and force a coalition government to be formed. In the wake of the brutal battle surrounding the consumption tax increase, Noda revived the Trans-Pacific Partnership as a campaign issue, making market liberalization the focal point of his campaign strategy.

In the general election, held on 16 December, the LDP enjoyed a resounding victory under the leadership of Shinzo Abe (former prime minister served from 2006 to 2007), winning an outright majority while the DPJ lost around three-fourths of its seats. Noda immediately announced his resignation as president of the DPJ in order to take responsibility for the defeat.

== Post-premiership (2012–present) ==
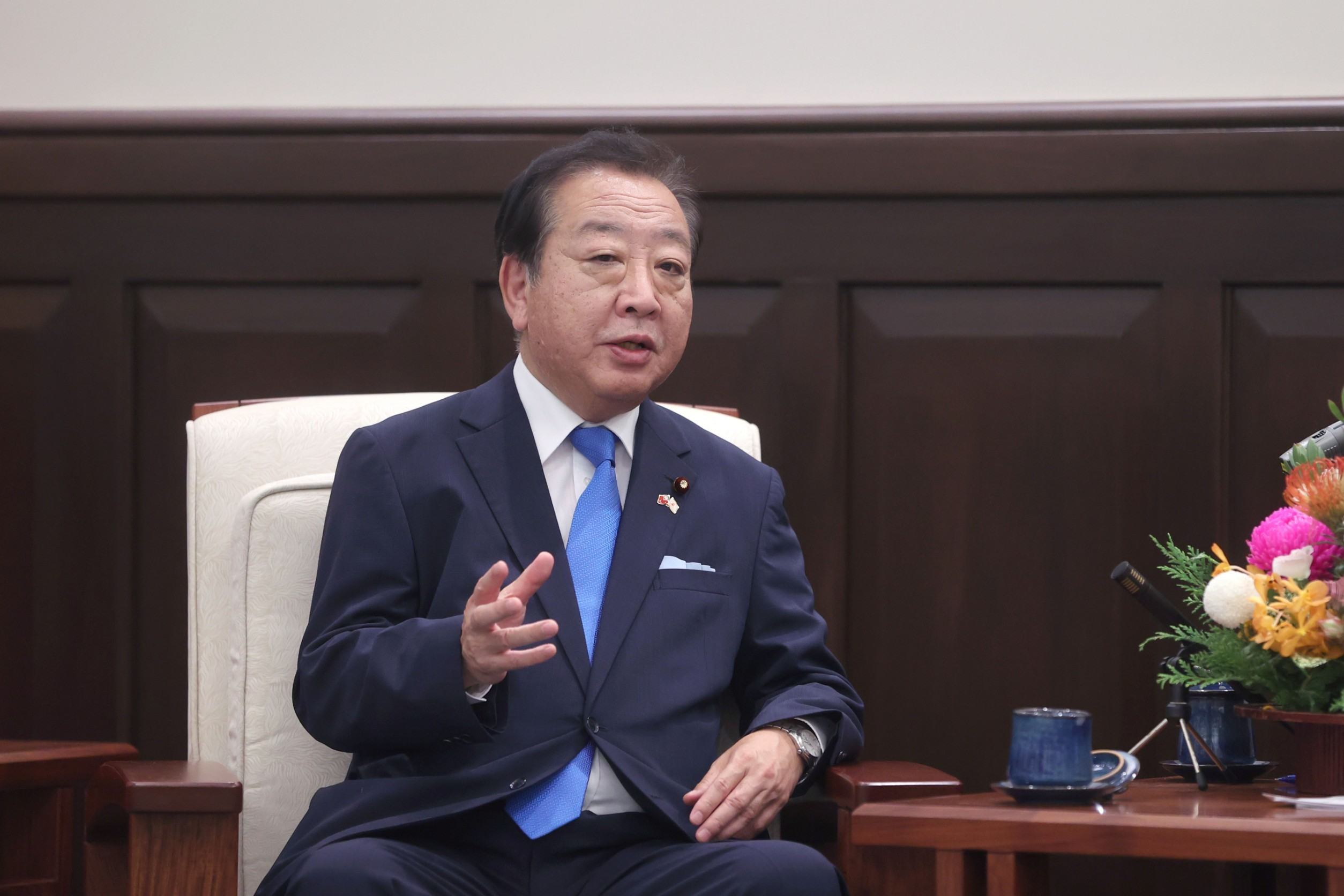
Noda during a visit to Taiwan in August 2024.

In March 2016 the DPJ and the Japan Innovation Party merged to form the new Democratic Party (Minshintō). In September of the same year a protégé of Noda, Renhō, was elected president of the party and Noda was appointed secretary-general. This was controversial within the party as many still blamed Noda for defeat in the 2012 election. Noda and Renhō both resigned from their posts after disastrous results in the July 2017 Tokyo Metropolitan Assembly elections.

After the assassination of Shinzo Abe on 8 July 2022, Noda attended the state funeral of Abe held on 27 September in Nippon Budokan as former prime minister, but most lawmakers of the Constitutional Democratic Party of Japan including his predecessors, Yukio Hatoyama and Naoto Kan were absent. Noda delivered a funeral oration of Abe on 25 October 2022 in the plenary session of the House of Representatives.

In late August 2024, Noda announced his intention to run in the Constitutional Democratic Party presidential election the following month, challenging the incumbent leader Kenta Izumi. He won the election on 23 September, defeating Yukio Edano in a runoff.

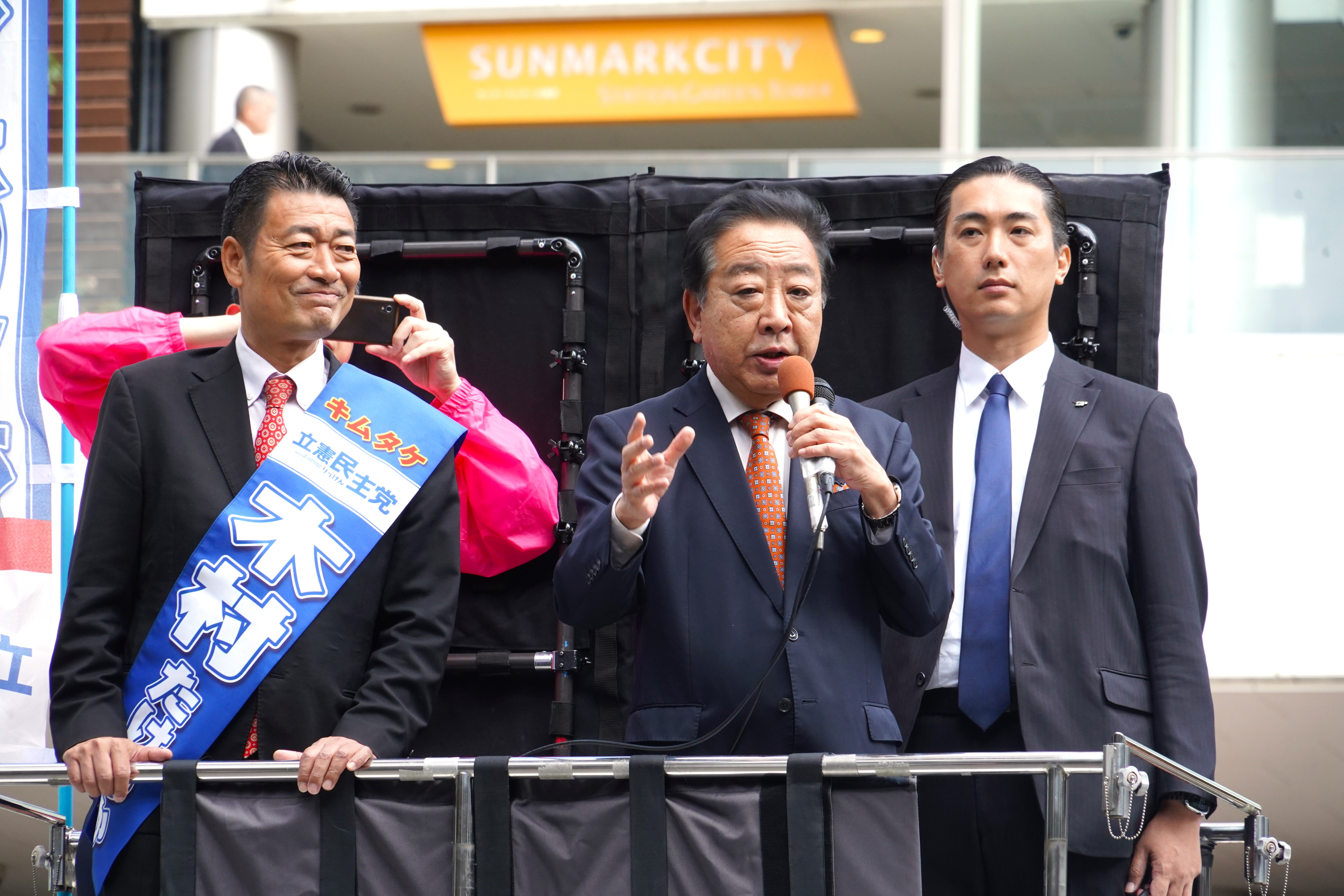
Noda campaigning during the 2024 Japanese general election in October 2024.

=== President of the Constitutional Democratic Party ===
After his election, Noda appointed Akira Nagatsuma, Kiyomi Tsujimoto and Hiroshi Ogushi as his deputies, as well as Junya Ogawa as secretary general and Kazuhiko Shigetoku as chairman of the Policy Research Council. He appointed his Next Cabinet on 30 September 2024.

Under Noda's leadership, the CDP made strong gains in the 2024 Japanese general election on October 27, during which the ruling LDP-Komeito coalition was reduced to a minority government. On 11 November, Noda lost a bid to become prime minister to the LDP's Shigeru Ishiba during an extraordinary session of the Diet.

After a heated argument between US President Trump and Ukrainian President Volodymyr Zelenskyy that took place during a televised meeting on 28 February 2025, Noda described Prime Minister Ishiba's response as "insufficient" adding that "Japan's stance is unclear. I'm dissatisfied."

In the 2025 Japanese House of Councillors election, the party gained 4 seats compared to the previous election in 2019.

On 15 January 2026, Noda and Tetsuo Saito announced that the CDP and Komeito would merge in the lower-house to form a new centrist party named the Centrist Reform Alliance. In the 2026 general election, the CRA collapsed to just 49 seats; he was personally re-elected in Chiba 14th district. Following the election, Noda and Saito resigned as party co-presidents.

== Personal life ==
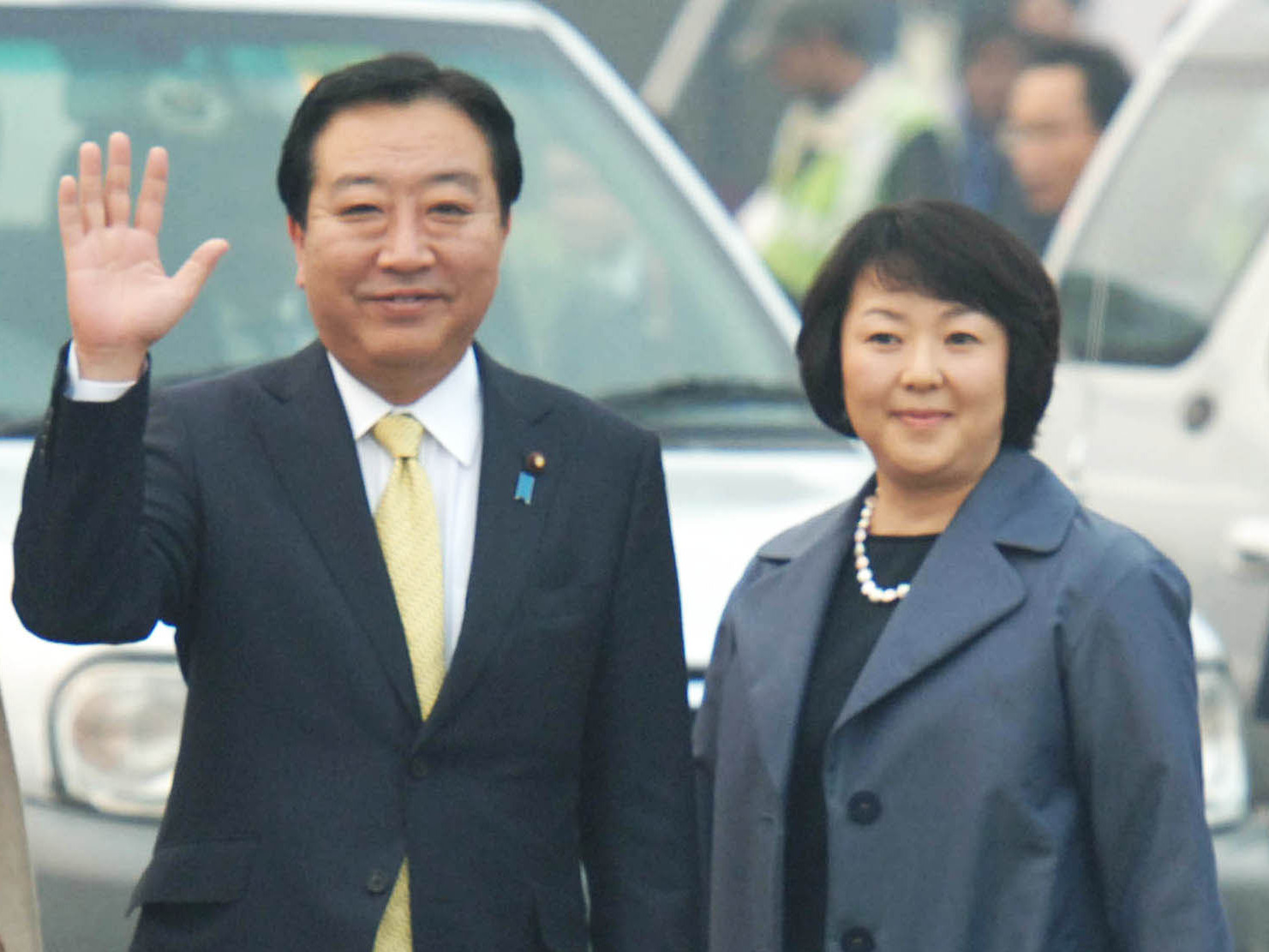
Yoshihiko and his wife Hitomi

Noda has been married to Hitomi since 1992 and has two sons. He has a black belt in judo. His favorite food and drink are ramen and sake. He wrote a book entitled Enemy of the DPJ: Government Change Has a Good Cause.

In an interview with The Washington Post, Noda said he loved watching movies and is a fan of Meryl Streep, who had recently won an Academy Award for her portrayal of the former British prime minister Margaret Thatcher in The Iron Lady. The movie follows Thatcher's life and career as she pushed through a series of economic and administrative reforms despite opposition from her countrymen. Noda also said one of his favorite movies is the 1939 film Mr. Smith Goes to Washington, which tells the story of a U.S. senator who single-handedly fights against political corruption.

Noda is a fan of professional wrestling and has stated that Kenta Kobashi is his favorite wrestler. On 11 May 2013, Noda attended Kobashi's retirement event, Final Burning in Budokan, in Tokyo's Nippon Budokan.

== See also ==
- Noda Cabinet
- Next Cabinet of Yoshihiko Noda

== Notes ==
House of Representatives (Japan)
Preceded by Ken'ichi Ueno	Representative for Chiba's 1st district 1993–1996	Constituency abolished
Preceded by Shōichi Tanaka	Representative for Chiba's 4th district 2000–present	Incumbent
Party political offices
Preceded by Takao Satō	Chief of Diet Affairs of the Democratic Party; 2002–2004	Succeeded by Tatsuo Kawabata
Preceded by Yoshio Hachiro	Chief of Diet Affairs of the Democratic Party; 2005–2006	Succeeded by Kōzō Watanabe
Preceded by Naoto Kan	President of the Democratic Party; 2011–2012	Succeeded by Banri Kaieda
Preceded by Yukio Edano	Secretary General of the Democratic Party; 2016–2017	Succeeded by Atsushi Oshima
Preceded by Kenta Izumi	President of the Constitutional Democratic Party; 2024–2026	Succeeded by Shunichi Mizuoka
Preceded by Office established	Co-president of the Centrist Reform Alliance; 2026–2026	Succeeded by Junya Ogawa
Political offices
Preceded by Naoto Kan	Minister of Finance; 2010–2011	Succeeded by Jun Azumi
Preceded by Naoto Kan	Prime Minister of Japan; 2011–2012	Succeeded by Shinzo Abe
