= University of Shizuoka =

University in Shizuoka City, Shizuoka Prefecture, Japan

Coordinates: 34°59′42″N 138°26′43″E

- 静岡県立大学
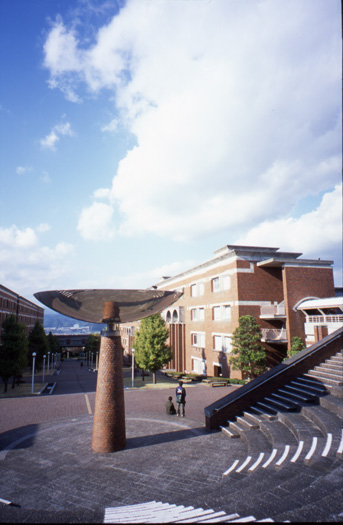
- Yada Campus (now Kusanagi Campus)
- Former names: Shizuoka College of Pharmacy; Shizuoka Women's University; Shizuoka Women's College
- Motto: 創知協働
- Motto in English: Creativity, Knowledge, Cooperation and Diligence
- Type: Public
- Established: April, 1987
- Founder: Terukichi Iwasaki
- Accreditation: Japan University Accreditation Association
- Chairman: Kazuo Oike
- President: Kazuo Oike
- Vice-president: Yasuyuki Imai; Hisao Tomizawa; Yoriko Watanabe; Satoshi Sakai; Kimiko Kobayashi
- Dean: Yoshiyuki Kagawa; Shinji Miura; Yasushi Terao; Hiroaki Yuze; Naoko Ōta; Shigenori Kumazawa; Tomohisa Ishikawa; Shin'ya Konaka; Kenshō Yagi; Ayako Yamada; Kimiko Kobayashi
- Director: Shūichi Yamamoto; Ken'ichirō Todoroki
- Academic staff: 276 (university) (May 1, 2022); 35 (junior college) (April 1, 2022)
- Administrative staff: 87 (university) (May 1, 2022); 14 (junior college) (April 1, 2022)
- Total staff: 363 (university) (May 1, 2022); 49 (junior college) (April 1, 2022)
- Undergraduates: 2,900 (May 1, 2022)
- Postgraduates: 352 (May 1, 2022)
- Doctoral students: 119 (May 1, 2022)
- Other students: 268 (junior college) (April 1, 2022)
- Location: Shizuoka City, Shizuoka Prefecture, Japan
- Campus: urban
- Website: www.u-shizuoka-ken.ac.jp
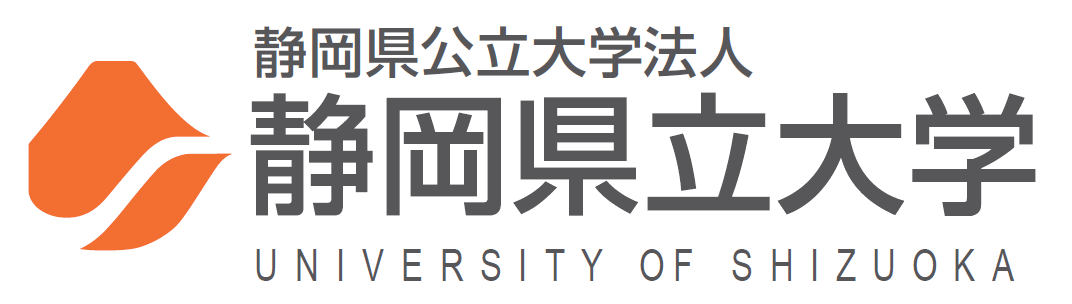

The University of Shizuoka (静岡県立大学, Shizuoka-ken ritsu Daigaku), is a public university in Shizuoka City, Shizuoka Prefecture, Japan.

== Overview ==
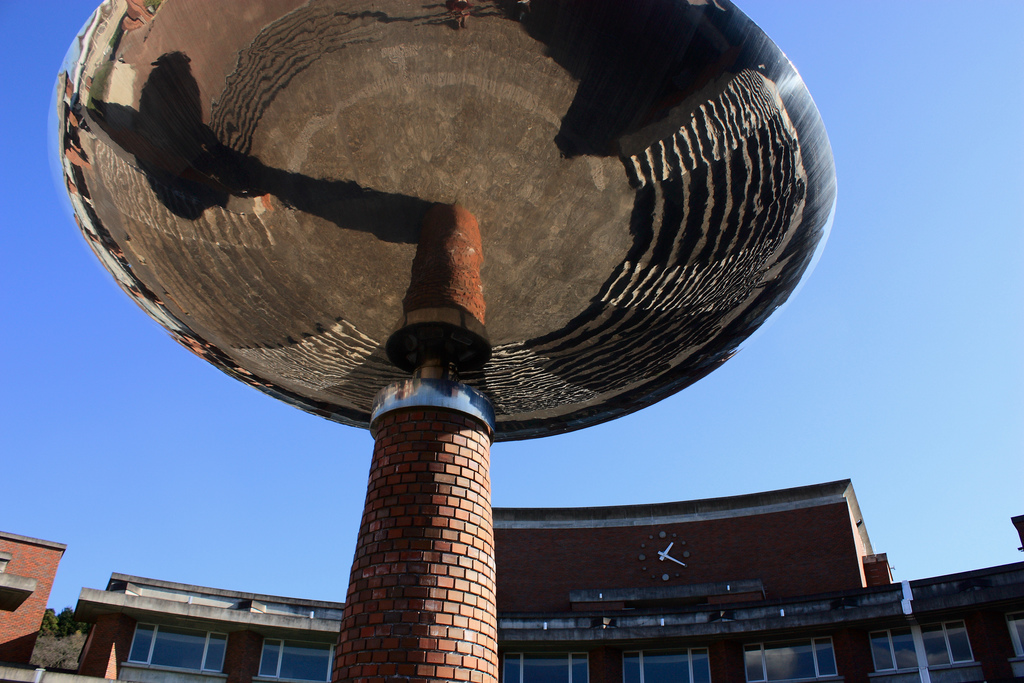
Yada Campus (now Kusanagi Campus)

The University of Shizuoka was created through the amalgamation of three former public universities in 1987 and was expanded to comprise five colleges. These are the School of Pharmaceutical Sciences, the School of Food and Nutritional Sciences, the Faculty of International Relations, the School of Administration and Informatics and the School of Nursing. (Note: In later years, the Faculty of International Relations, University of Shizuoka was renamed the School of International Relations.) (Note: The School of Administration and Informatics, University of Shizuoka was renamed the School of Management and Information in 2010.) In addition to the undergraduate programs offered in the various departments of these colleges, the university also maintains graduate schools consisting of the Graduate School of Pharmaceutical Sciences, the Graduate School of Nutritional and Environmental Sciences, the Graduate School of International Relations, the Graduate School of Administration and Informatics and the Graduate School of Nursing, as well as a variety of research institutes, inter-disciplinary centers and other research centers. (Note: In later years, the Graduate School of Administration and Informatics, University of Shizuoka was renamed the Graduate School of Management and Information.) The university also operates a two-year junior college, which is on a separate campus from the main university.

In 2011, the Graduate School of Management and Information was reorganized into the Graduate School of Management and Information of Innovation. In 2012, the Graduate School of Pharmaceutical Sciences and the Graduate School of Nutritional and Environmental Sciences were merged and reorganized into the Graduate School of Integrated Pharmaceutical and Nutritional Sciences, an educational organization, the Graduate Division of Pharmaceutical Sciences and the Graduate Division of Nutritional and Environmental Sciences, research organizations.

The University of Shizuoka is located in the prefectural capital of Shizuoka. Kusanagi Campus is near Kusanagi Station on the JR Tōkaidō Main Line, six minutes from Shizuoka Station. It is roughly halfway between the town centers of the former cities of Shimizu and Shizuoka (which were merged to form a single city in 2003). It forms an important part of a major cultural and educational complex which also includes Shizuoka Prefectural Central Library and Shizuoka Prefectural Museum of Art.

The Japanese name of the university is Shizuoka-ken ritsu Daigaku (静岡県立大学), which translates literally as "Prefectural University of Shizuoka." Since the English version of the Japanese term prefecture is unfamiliar to many English speakers, the university's English name was simplified to the "University of Shizuoka." This leads to some confusion, in English at least, since another nearby national university has a very similar name in English (that institution is Shizuoka University (静岡大学, Shizuoka Daigaku)).

== History ==
=== Pharmacy school (old school system) ===
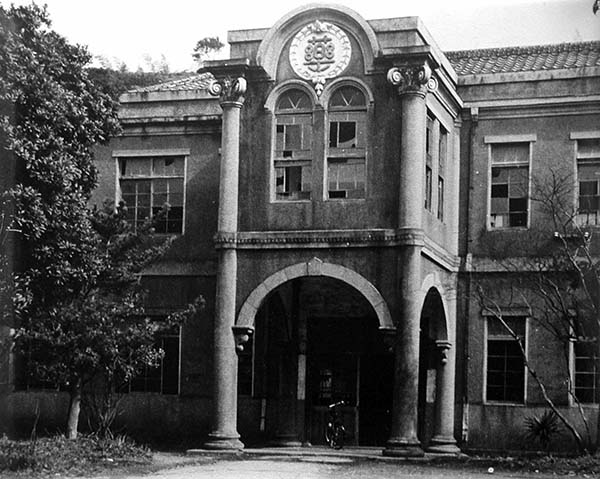
Main Building of Shizuoka Women's School of Pharmacy (Kawarabacho Campus)

Shizuoka Women's School of Pharmacy (静岡女子薬学校, Shizuoka Joshi Yakugakkō) was founded by Terukichi Iwasaki in 1916. It was a pharmacy school (薬学校, yakugakkō) that was an institution of higher education in the Empire of Japan.

In those days, pharmacy schools for women were very rare in the Empire of Japan. Iwasaki believed that higher education for women was important. Iwasaki ran Iwasaki Eye Clinic in Takajōmachi, Shizuoka City, Shizuoka Prefecture, and Shizuoka Women's School of Pharmacy established at this clinic building. Iwasaki became the Principal and was planning to move Shizuoka Women's School of Pharmacy to a new campus in Kawarabachō, Shizuoka City, Shizuoka Prefecture. But Iwasaki died suddenly in 1925.

Kōtarō Shinoda became the Principal in 1926. Shinoda revived Shizuoka Women's School of Pharmacy. Shinoda promoted the construction of the Main Building at Kawarabacho Campus. The Main Building was completed in 1930.

=== Specialized school (old school system) ===
Shizuoka Women's School of Pharmacy was upgraded from a pharmacy school to a specialized school (専門学校, senmongakkō), and Shizuoka Women's College of Pharmacy (静岡女子薬学専門学校, Shizuoka Joshi Yakugaku Senmongakkō) was established in 1945. The specialized school was an institution of higher education in the Empire of Japan. In 1950, Shizuoka Women's College of Pharmacy was coeducational and became Shizuoka College of Pharmacy (静岡薬学専門学校, Shizuoka Yakugaku Senmongakkō).

After the World War II, specialized schools under the old school system were required to transition to universities under the new school system. Shizuoka College of Pharmacy was run by a foundation, but its finances were unstable. To solve this problem, the college was transferred to Shizuoka Prefectural Government. In 1952, Shizuoka College of Pharmacy was transformed from a private specialized school to public specialized school and became Shizuoka Prefectual College of Pharmacy (静岡県立薬学専門学校, Shizuoka-ken ritsu Yakugaku Senmongakkō).

=== University (present-day school system) ===
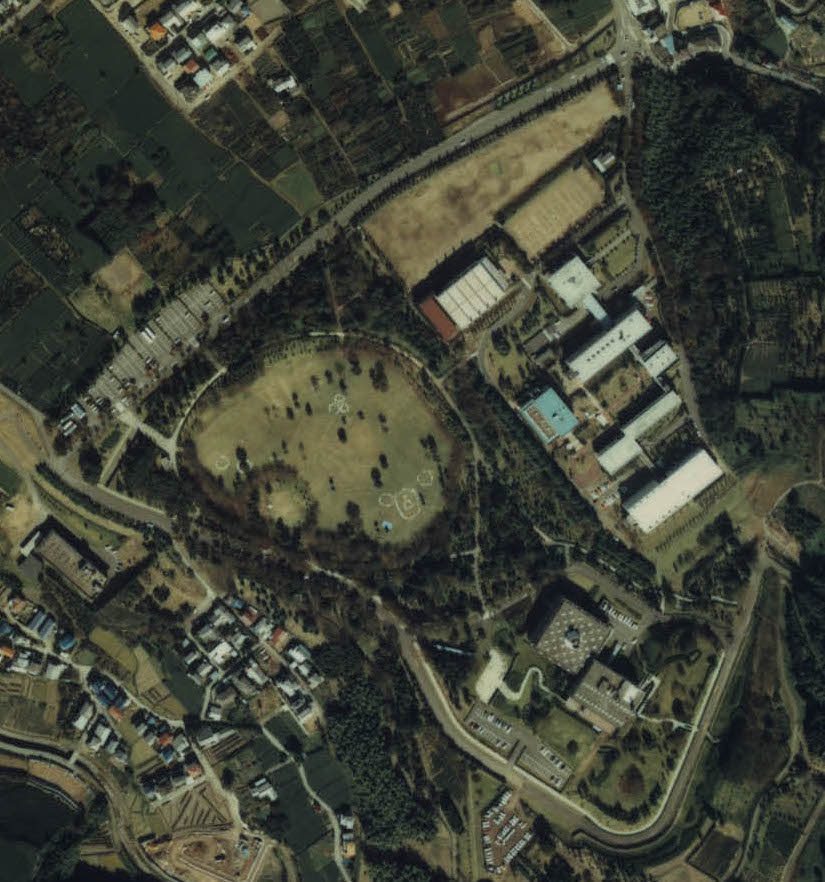
Shizuoka Women's University (Yada Campus, 1983)

Shizuoka Prefectual College of Pharmacy was upgraded from a specialized school to a university (大学, daigaku), and Shizuoka College of Pharmacy (静岡薬科大学, Shizuoka Yakka Daigaku) was established in 1953. On the other hand Shizuoka Women's College (静岡女子短期大学, Shizuoka Joshi Tankidaigaku) was a new junior college (短期大学, tankidaigaku) founded by Shizuoka Prefectual Government in 1951. In addition, Shizuoka Women's University (静岡女子大学, Shizuoka Joshi Daigaku) was a new university founded by Shizuoka Prefectual Government in 1967.

In 1987, Shizuoka College of Pharmacy, Shizuoka Women's University and Shizuoka Women's College were merged to form the University of Shizuoka. In 2000, Hamamatsu Campus of the University of Shizuoka became independent as Shizuoka University of Art and Culture (静岡文化芸術大学, Shizuoka Bunka Geijutsu Daigaku). On April 1, 2007, Shizuoka Prefectural University Corporation was established by Shizuoka Prefectural Government. Until March 31, 2007, the University of Shizuoka had been administered by Shizuoka Prefectural Government, but since April 1, 2007, it has been administered by Shizuoka Prefectural University Corporation. In 2012, the University of Shizuoka absorbed research functions of Shizuoka Research Institute (静岡総合研究機構, Shizuoka Sōgō Kenkyū Kikō). On December 10, 2018, Tasuku Honjo, Advisor to Shizuoka Prefectural University Corporation, received a medal and certificate for Nobel Prize in Physiology or Medicine. (Note: Tasuku Honjo was the Chairman of the Board of Directors, Shizuoka Prefectural University Corporation from April, 2012 to April, 2017. He was inaugurated as Advisor to Shizuoka Prefectural University Corporation in May 2017.)

== Organization ==
=== Under graduate ===
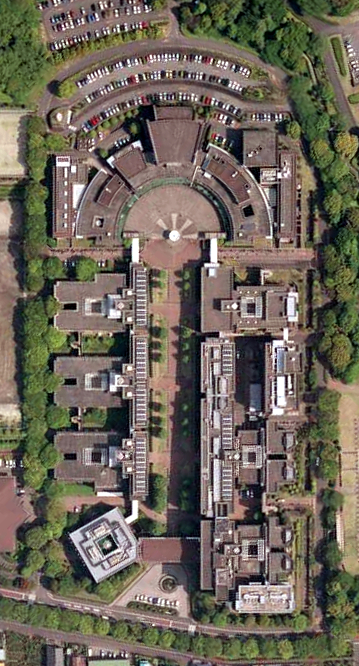
buildings of Yada Campus (now Kusanagi Campus)

- School of Pharmaceutical Sciences
  - Division of Pharmaceutical Sciences
  - Division of Pharmacy
- School of Food and Nutritional Sciences
  - Department of Food Science and Biotechnology
  - Department of Nutrition and Life Sciences
  - Department of Environmental and Life Sciences
- School of International Relations
  - Department of International Relations
  - Department of International Languages and Cultures
- School of Management and Information
  - Department of Management and Information
- School of Nursing
  - Department of Nursing

=== Graduate ===
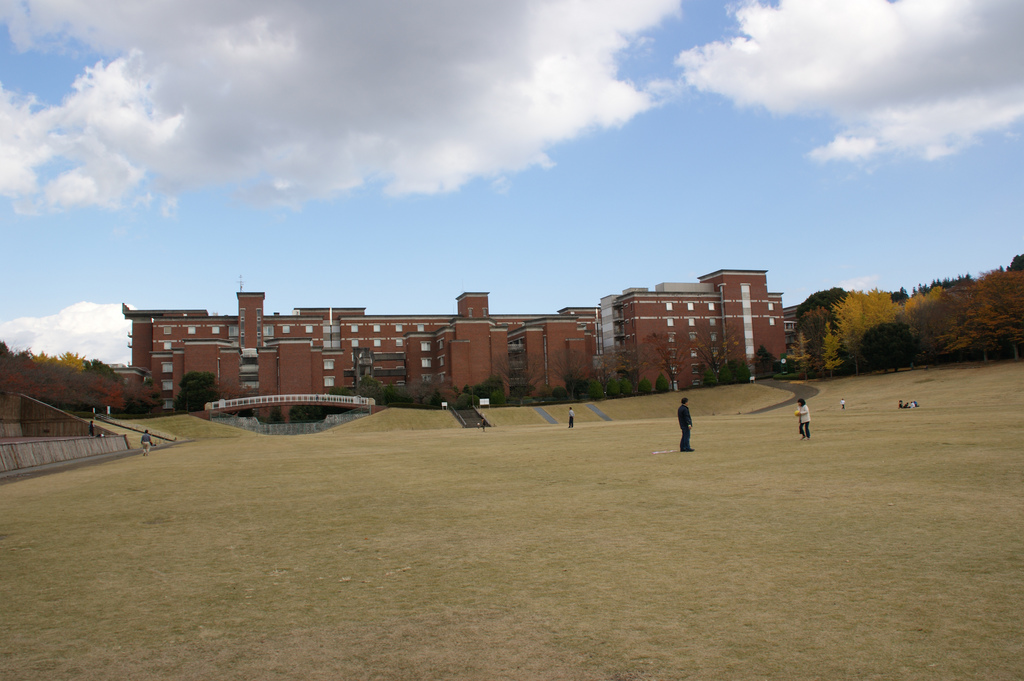
Yada Campus (now Kusanagi Campus)

- Graduate School of Integrated Pharmaceutical and Nutritional Sciences
  - Graduate Program in Pharmacy
  - Graduate Program in Pharmaceutical Sciences
  - Graduate Program in Pharmaceutical and Nutritional Sciences
  - Graduate Program in Food and Nutritional Sciences
  - Graduate Program in Environmental Health Sciences
- Graduate Division of Pharmaceutical Sciences
- Graduate Division of Nutritional and Environmental Sciences
- Graduate School of International Relations
  - Division of International Relations
  - Division of Comparative Culture
- Graduate School of Management and Information of Innovation
  - Division of Management and Information of Innovation
- Graduate School of Nursing
  - Division of Nursing

=== Library ===
- University Library

=== Research institute ===
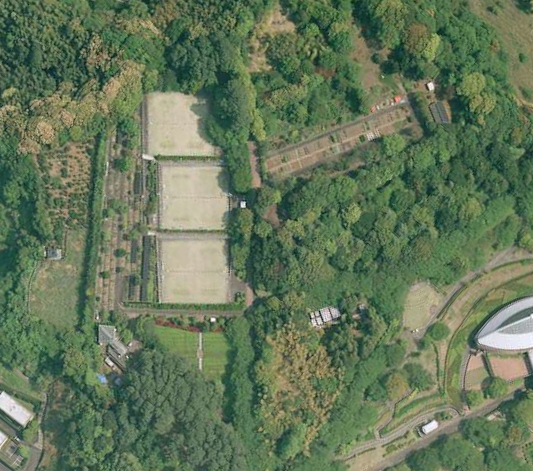
Medicinal Plant Garden, School of Pharmaceutical Sciences (Yada Campus, 2009)

- Health Support Center
- Information Technology Center
- Language and Communication Research Center
- Center for Promotion of Gender Equality
- Global Center for Asian and Regional Research
- Fuji-no-Kuni Center for Future Education
- Institute of Traditional Chinese Medicine, School of Pharmaceutical Sciences
- Medicinal Plant Garden, School of Pharmaceutical Sciences
- Center for Nursing Professional Development, School of Nursing
- Center for Drug Discovery, Graduate Division of Pharmaceutical Sciences
- Center for Pharma-Food Research, Graduate Division of Pharmaceutical Sciences
- Food and Environment Research Center, Graduate Division of Nutritional and Environmental Sciences
- Tea Science Center, Graduate Division of Nutritional and Environmental Sciences
- Center for Korean Studies, Graduate School of International Relations
- Wider Europe Research Center, Graduate School of International Relations
- Center for Global Studies, Graduate School of International Relations
- Center for Regional Management Studies, Graduate School of Management and Information of Innovation
- Center for Health Services Management Studies, Graduate School of Management and Information of Innovation
- Research Center for ICT Innovation, Graduate School of Management and Information of Innovation
- Tourism Research Center, Graduate School of Management and Information of Innovation

=== Administration Offices ===
- Management Strategy Department
- General Affairs Department
- Education Research Promotion Department
- Student Affairs Department

=== Junior college ===
- Department of Dental Hygiene
- Department of Social Welfare
  - Division of Social Welfare
  - Division of Care Welfare
- Department of Child Studies

== Chronology ==
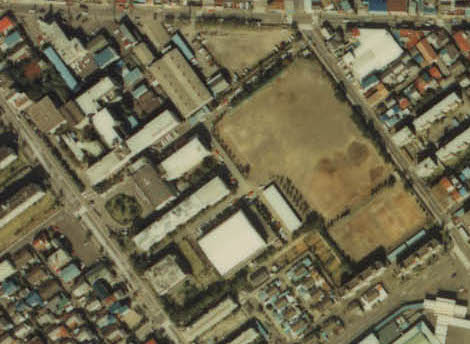
Shizuoka College of Pharmacy (Ojika Campus, 1983)

- 1916 - Shizuoka Women's School of Pharmacy was founded.
- 1945 - Reorganized into Shizuoka Women's College of Pharmacy.
- 1950 - Reorganized into Shizuoka College of Pharmacy.
- 1951 - Shizuoka Women's College was founded.
- 1952 - Reorganized into Shizuoka Prefectual College of Pharmacy.
- 1953 - Reorganized into Shizuoka College of Pharmacy.
- 1967 - Shizuoka Women's University was founded.
- 1987 - University of Shizuoka was founded.

== Chart ==
Shizuoka Research Institute
Shizuoka Women's School of Pharmacy	Shizuoka Women's College of Pharmacy	Shizuoka College of Pharmacy	Shizuoka Prefectual College of Pharmacy	Shizuoka College of Pharmacy
Shizuoka Women's University	University of Shizuoka	University of Shizuoka	University of Shizuoka
Shizuoka Women's College
Shizuoka University of Art and Culture

== Chairmen of the board of directors ==
Chairmen of Shizuoka Prefectural University Corporation
	Name	From	To	Notes
1	Masachika Suzuki	April 1, 2007	March 31, 2011	
2	Hiroshi Takeuchi	April 1, 2011	March 31, 2012	
3	Tasuku Honjo	April 1, 2012	April 30, 2017	
-	(Hiroshi Kitō)	(May 1, 2017)	(March 31, 2018)	(Acting)
4	Kazuo Oike	April 1, 2018	March 31, 2024	
5	Yasuyuki Imai	April 1, 2024	(now)	

== Presidents ==
Presidents of the University of Shizuoka
	Name	From	To	Notes
1	Kōji Uchizono	April 1, 1987	March 31, 1993	
2	Takeshi Hoshi	April 1, 1993	March 31, 1999	
3	Masaaki Hirobe	April 1, 1999	March 31, 2005	
4	Masaru Nishigaki	April 1, 2005	January 31, 2009	
-	(Naohide Kinae)	(February 1, 2009)	(March 9, 2009)	(Acting)
5	Naohide Kinae	March 10, 2009	March 31, 2015	
6	Hiroshi Kitō	April 1, 2015	March 31, 2021	
7	Kazuo Oike	April 1, 2021	March 31, 2024	
8	Yasuyuki Imai	April 1, 2024	(now)	

== Notable alumni and faculty members ==
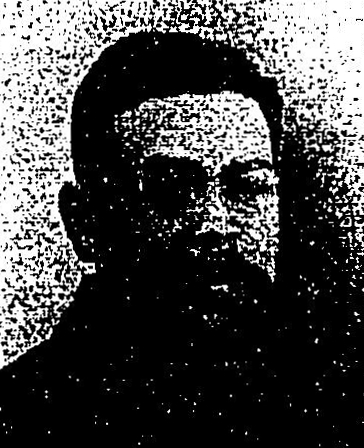
Terukichi Iwasaki (Note: Terukichi Iwasaki was the Principal of Shizuoka Women's School of Pharmacy.)

Etsuo Miyamichi (Note: Etsuo Miyamichi was the President of Shizuoka College of Pharmacy.)

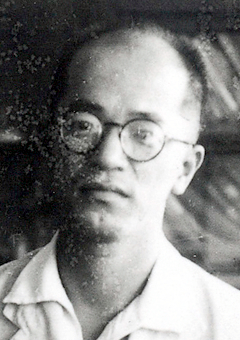
Shōjirō Ueo (Note: Shōjirō Ueo was the President of Shizuoka College of Pharmacy.)

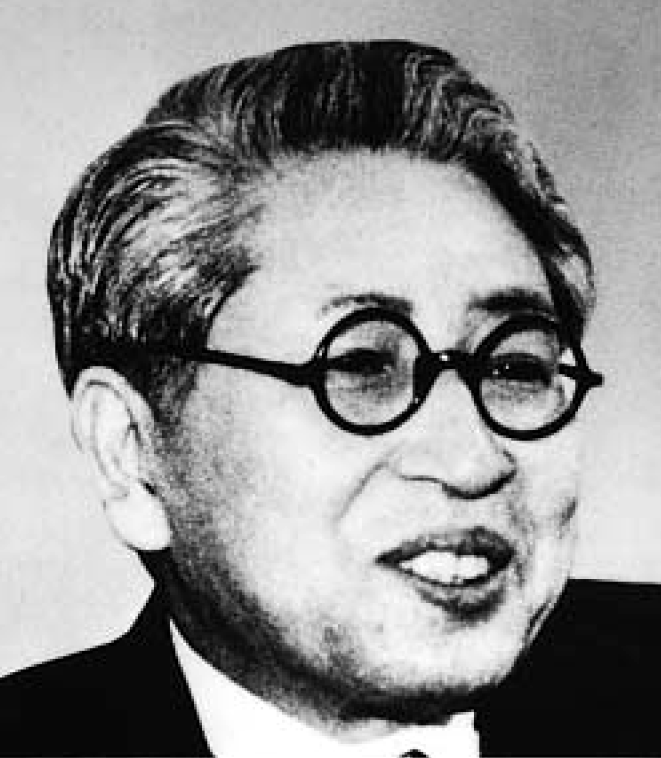
Teiji Ukai (Note: Teiji Ukai was the President of Shizuoka College of Pharmacy.)

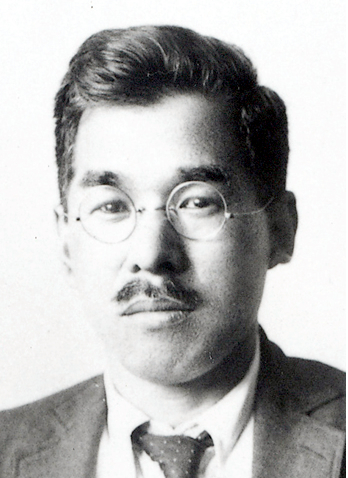
Shigeru Ōsugi (Note: Shigeru Ōsugi was the President of Shizuoka Women's College.)

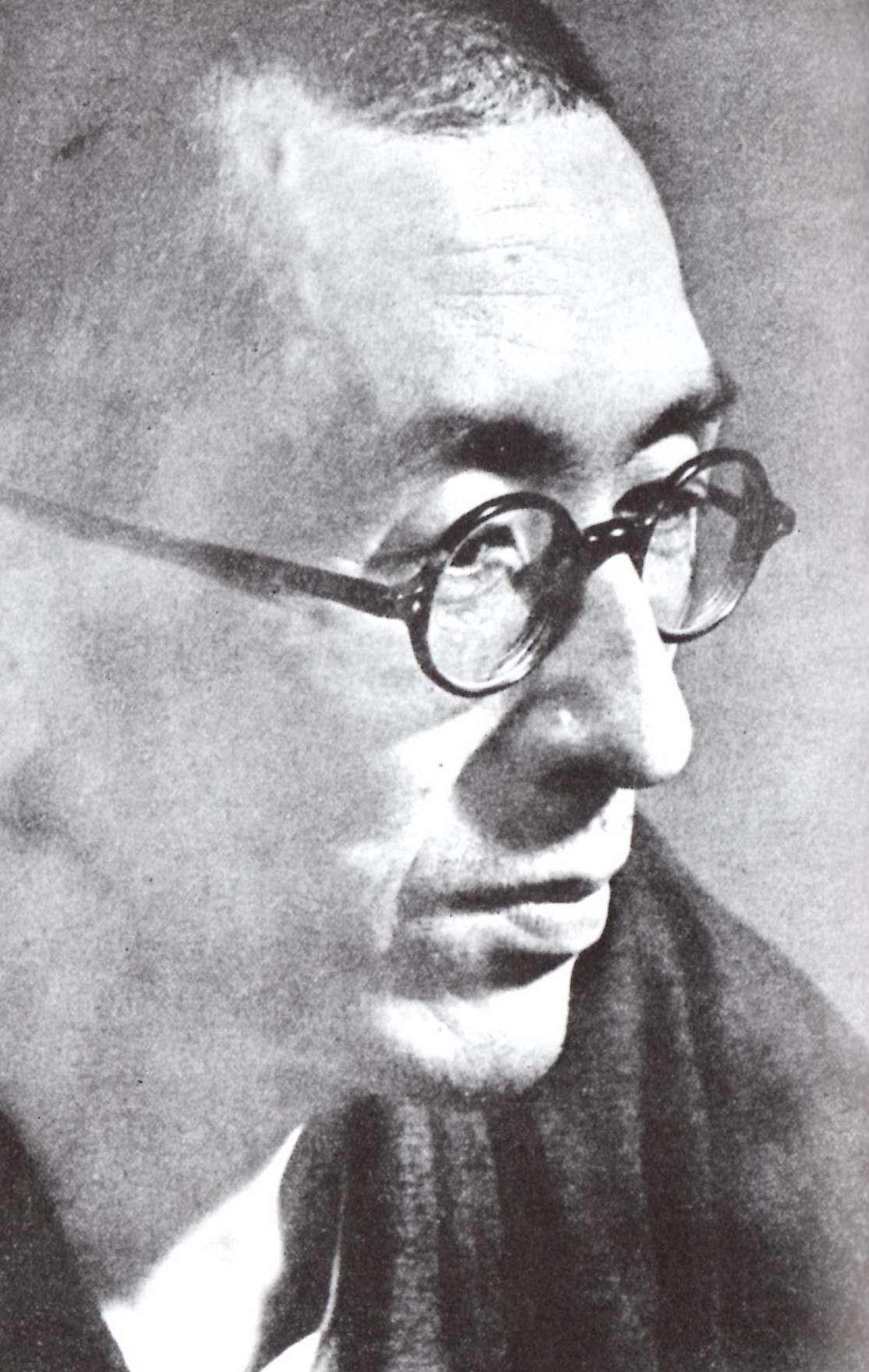
Keisuke Serizawa (Note: Keisuke Serizawa was a faculty of the Department of Home Economics, Shizuoka Women's College.)

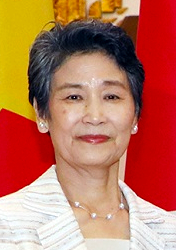
Mariko Suga (Note: Mariko Suga graduated from the School of Home Economics, Shizuoka Women's University.)

Etsurō Honda (Note: Etsurō Honda was the Professor of the School of International Relations, University of Shizuoka.)

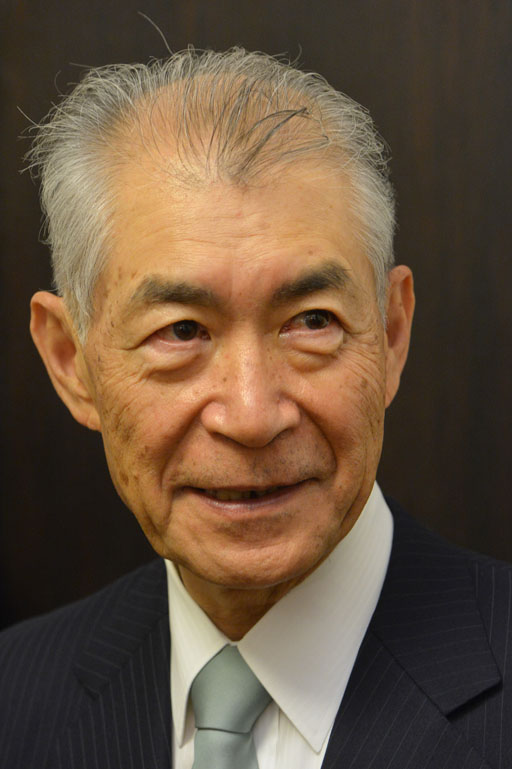
Tasuku Honjo (Note: Tasuku Honjo was the Chairman of the Board of Directors, Shizuoka Prefectural University Corporation.)

Kunihiko Iwasaki (Note: Kunihiko Iwasaki was the Professor of the School of Management and Information, University of Shizuoka.)

Hajime Izumi (Note: Hajime Izumi was the Professor of the School of International Relations, University of Shizuoka.)

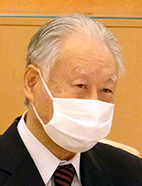
Hiroshi Kitō (Note: Hiroshi Kitō was the President of the University of Shizuoka.)

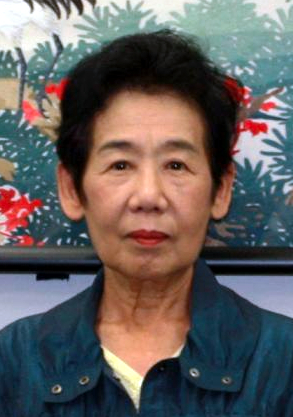
Kazuko Mōri (Note: Kazuko Mōri was the Professor of the School of International Relations, University of Shizuoka.)

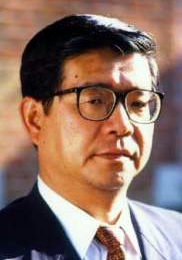
Terumasa Nakanishi (Note: Terumasa Nakanishi was the Professor of the School of International Relations, University of Shizuoka.)

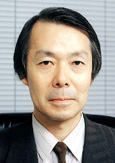
Kazuhisa Ogawa (Note: Kazuhisa Ogawa was the Project Professor of the Global Center for Asian and Regional Research, University of Shizuoka.)

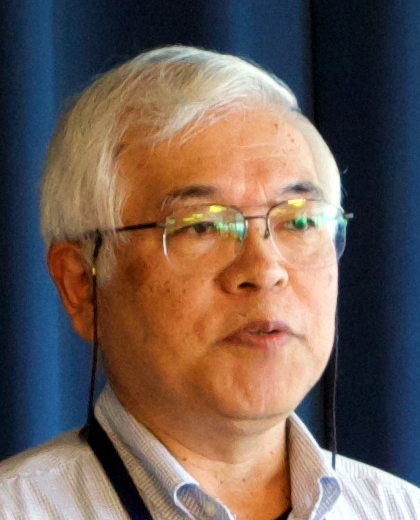
Naoyoshi Suzuki (Note: Naoyoshi Suzuki was the Dean of the School of Management and Information, University of Shizuoka.)

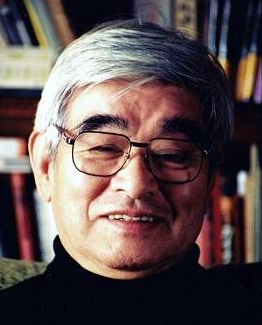
Masao Yamaguchi (Note: Masao Yamaguchi was the Professor of the Graduate School of International Relations, University of Shizuoka.)

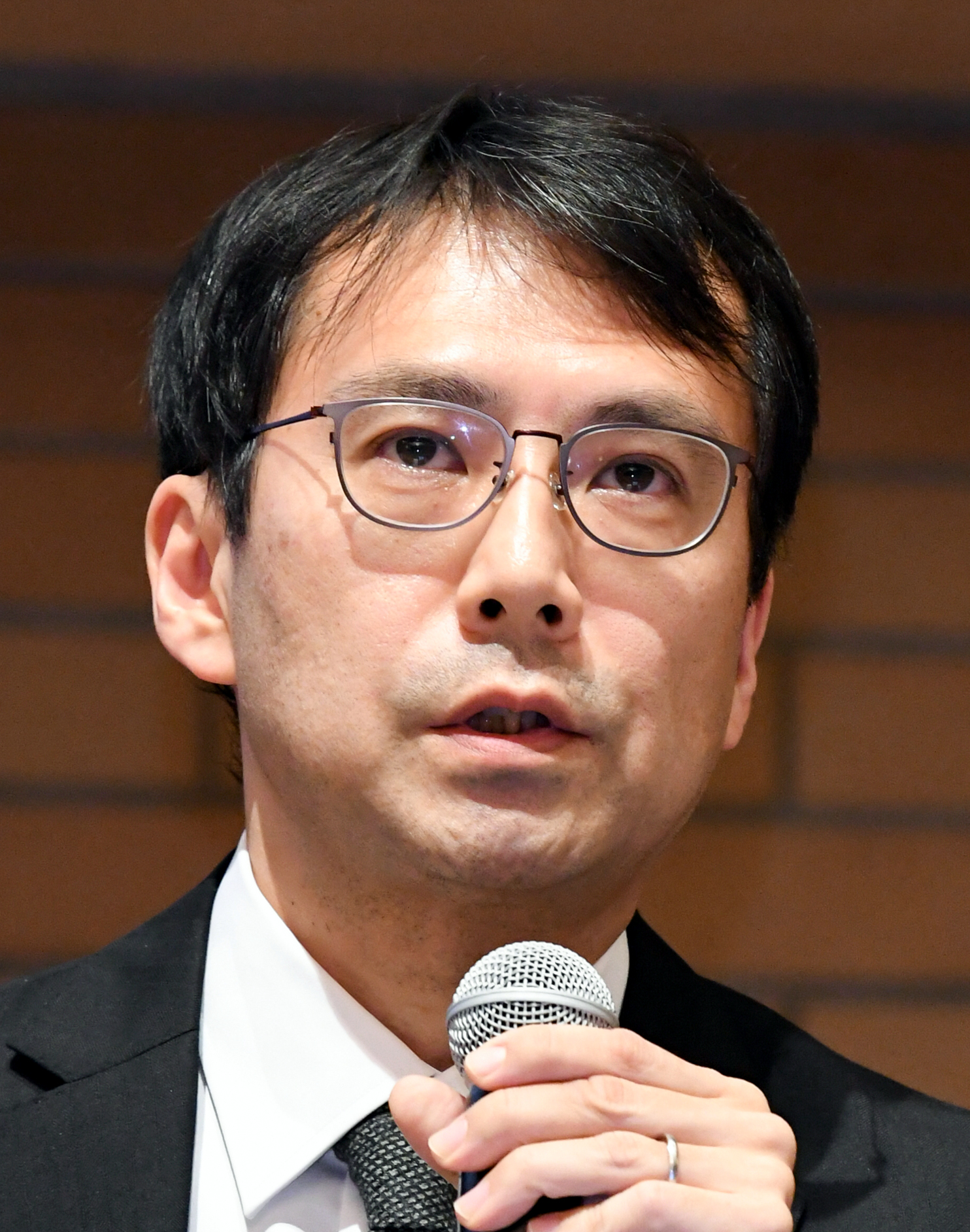
Hikaru Yamashita (Note: Hikaru Yamashita was the Professor of the School of International Relations, University of Shizuoka.)

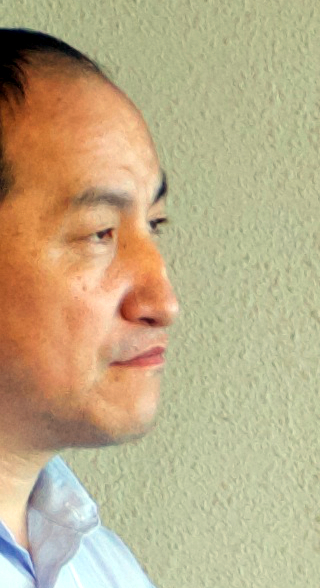
Hiroaki Yuze (Note: Hiroaki Yuze was the Dean of the School of Management and Information, University of Shizuoka.)

== See also ==
- Shizuoka University – a national university in Shizuoka City, Shizuoka Prefecture, Japan
