= Kikue Katayama =

- 片山 菊江
- Born: Kikue Shimizu; 1894; Aichi Prefecture, Empire of Japan
- Died: July 14, 1985 (aged 90–91); National Hospital Organization Tokyo Medical Center, Higashigaoka, Meguro, Tokyo, Japan
- Spouse: Tetsu Katayama (m. 1913)
- Children: 5

Kikue Katayama (片山 菊江, Katayama Kikue; also written as きくゑ; 1894 – 14 July 1985) was the wife of Tetsu Katayama, the 46th Prime Minister of Japan (serving as Spouse of the Prime Minister of Japan). She was from Aichi Prefecture.

== Biography ==
Kikue Katayama was born in 1894 in Aichi Prefecture as the eldest daughter of Tokutarō Shimizu. She graduated from Okazaki Higher Girls' School (now Aichi Prefectural Okazaki Kita Senior High School). In 1913, she married Tetsu Katayama. The couple had two sons and three daughters.

In December 1977, she met with then-Prime Minister Takeo Fukuda, carrying a letter from Tetsu Katayama calling for the conclusion of the Treaty of Peace and Friendship between Japan and China. In 1980, she was invited by Chinese Chairman Hua Guofeng during his visit to Japan as a bereaved family member of a contributor to Japan–China friendship.

She died of acute leukemia on 14 July 1985 at the National Tokyo Second Hospital (now the National Hospital Organization Tokyo Medical Center) in Meguro, Tokyo, at the age of 90.

Preceded by Kiyo Yoshida	Spouse of the Prime Minister of Japan; 24 May 1947 – 10 March 1948	Succeeded by Sumi Ashida
