= List of spouses of prime ministers of Japan =

Spouse of the Prime Minister of Japan
- 内閣総理大臣配偶者
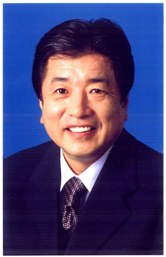
- Incumbent; Taku Yamamoto since 21 October 2025
- Residence: Naikaku Sōri Daijin Kantei (Prime Minister's Official Residence)
- Formation: 22 December 1885; 140 years ago
- First holder: Itō Umeko

This is a list of spouses of prime ministers of Japan.

The media often refers to the spouse of a Japanese prime minister as the "First Lady of Japan" or "First Gentleman of Japan." However, as the prime minister is not head of state but head of government, this differs considerably from its equivalent in the United States (the spouse of the head of state is the Empress of Japan).

The current prime minister, Sanae Takaichi, has been remarried to Taku Yamamoto since 2021; the couple were first married in 2004 and divorced in 2017.

== Role and duties ==
The role of the prime minister's consort is not an official position, and so they are not given a salary or official duties.

== List of spouses ==
No.	Portrait	Name	Tenure began	Tenure ended	Prime minister
1		Itō Umeko 伊藤 梅子; 3 December 1848 – 12 April 1924	22 December 1885	30 April 1888	Itō Hirobumi married in 1866
2		Kuroda Taki 黒田 滝子; 27 September 1863 – 1904	30 April 1888	25 October 1889	Kuroda Kiyotaka married on 10 December 1880
3		Yamagata Tomoko 山縣 友子; 13 June 1851 – 12 September 1893	24 December 1889	6 May 1891	Yamagata Aritomo married in 1868
4		Matsukata Masako 松方 満佐子; 18 April 1845 – 13 September 1920	6 May 1891	8 August 1892	Matsukata Masayoshi married in 1860
(1)		Itō Umeko 伊藤 梅子; 3 December 1848 – 12 April 1924	8 August 1892	31 August 1896	Itō Hirobumi married in 1866
(4)		Matsukata Masako 松方 満佐子; 18 April 1845 – 13 September 1920	18 September 1896	12 January 1898	Matsukata Masayoshi married in 1860
(1)		Itō Umeko 伊藤 梅子; 3 December 1848 – 12 April 1924	12 January 1898	30 June 1898	Itō Hirobumi married in 1866
5		Ōkuma Ayako 大隈 綾子; 28 November 1850 – 28 April 1923	30 June 1898	8 November 1898	Ōkuma Shigenobu married in 1869
–	Vacant		8 November 1898	19 October 1900	Yamagata Aritomo
(1)		Itō Umeko 伊藤 梅子; 3 December 1848 – 12 April 1924	19 October 1900	10 May 1901	Itō Hirobumi married in 1866
6		Katsura Kanako 桂 可那子; 20 February 1875 – 17 August 1940	2 June 1901	7 January 1906	Katsura Tarō married in 1891
–	Vacant		7 January 1906	14 July 1908	Saionji Kinmochi
(6)		Katsura Kanako 桂 可那子; 20 February 1875 – 17 August 1940	14 July 1908	30 August 1911	Katsura Tarō married in 1891
–	Vacant		30 August 1911	21 December 1912	Saionji Kinmochi
(6)		Katsura Kanako 桂 可那子; 20 February 1875 – 17 August 1940	21 December 1912	20 February 1913	Katsura Tarō married in 1891
7		Yamamoto Tokiko 山本 登喜子; 6 June 1880 – 30 March 1933	20 February 1913	16 April 1914	Yamamoto Gonnohyōe married on 28 August 1878
(5)		Ōkuma Ayako 大隈 綾子; 28 November 1850 – 28 April 1923	16 April 1914	9 October 1916	Ōkuma Shigenobu married in 1869
8		Terauchi Taki 寺内 タキ; 18 January 1863 – 4 June 1920	9 October 1916	29 September 1918	Terauchi Masatake married on unknown date
9		Hara Asa 原 淺 1871 – 1923	29 September 1918	4 November 1921	Hara Takashi married in 1908
10		Takahashi Shina 高橋 志な; 4 November 1865 – 31 May 1946	13 November 1921	12 June 1922	Takahashi Korekiyo married in 1890
11		Kiyoko Katō 加藤 喜代子; 25 December 1874 – 20 January 1940	12 June 1922	24 August 1923	Katō Tomosaburō married in 1890
(7)		Yamamoto Tokiko 山本 登喜子; 6 June 1880 – 30 March 1933	2 September 1923	7 January 1924	Yamamoto Gonnohyōe married on 28 August 1878
12		Kiyoura Tōko 清浦 錬子; 24 March 1858 – 6 October 1944	7 January 1924	11 June 1924	Kiyoura Keigo married in 1873
13		Katō Haruji 加藤 春路; 17 March 1864 – December 1942	11 June 1924	28 January 1926	Katō Takaaki married in 1886
14		Tokuko Wakatsuki 若槻 德子; 28 April 1872 – 3 December 1956	28 January 1926	20 April 1927	Wakatsuki Reijirō married in 1892
15		Sute Tanaka 田中 壽天; 24 August 1874 – September 1937	20 April 1927	2 July 1929	Tanaka Giichi married in 1893
16		Natsu Hamaguchi 濱口 夏 1873 – died on unknown date	2 July 1929	14 April 1931	Hamaguchi Osachi married in 1889
(14)		Tokuko Wakatsuki 若槻 德子; 28 April 1872 – 3 December 1956	14 April 1931	13 December 1931	Wakatsuki Reijirō married in 1892
17		Chiyoko Inukai 犬養 千代子; 1865 – 25 August 1952	13 December 1931	15 May 1932	Inukai Tsuyoshi married in 1891
18		Haruko Saitō 齋藤 春子; 10 March 1873 – 14 September 1971	26 May 1932	8 July 1934	Saitō Makoto married on 5 February 1892
–	Vacant		8 July 1934	9 March 1936	Keisuke Okada
19		Shizuko Hirota 廣田 静子; 1885 – 18 May 1946	9 March 1936	2 February 1937	Kōki Hirota married in 1905
20		Hatsu Hayashi 林 初治; 1887 – died on unknown date	2 February 1937	4 June 1937	Senjūrō Hayashi married on unknown date
21		Chiyoko Konoe 近衞 千代子; 11 January 1896 – 15 September 1980	4 June 1937	5 January 1939	Fumimaro Konoe married on unknown date
–	Vacant		5 January 1939	30 August 1939	Hiranuma Kiichirō
22		Mitsuko Abe 阿部 みつ子; 1886 – died on unknown date	30 August 1939	16 January 1940	Nobuyuki Abe married on unknown date
23		Koma Yonai 米内 こま; 1888 – 1941	16 January 1940	22 July 1940	Mitsumasa Yonai married in 1906
(21)		Chiyoko Konoe 近衞 千代子; 11 January 1896 – 15 September 1980	22 July 1940	18 October 1941	Fumimaro Konoe married on unknown date
24		Katsuko Tōjō 東條 かつ子; 8 October 1890 – 29 May 1982	17 October 1941	22 July 1944	Hideki Tojo married on 11 April 1909
25		Kaoruko Koiso 小磯 馨子; 1887 – May 1950	22 July 1944	7 April 1945	Kuniaki Koiso married in 1907
26		Taka Suzuki 鈴木 たか; 4 July 1883 – 23 September 1971	7 April 1945	17 August 1945	Kantarō Suzuki married in 1915
27		Princess Toshiko Higashikuni 稔彦王妃 聡子内親王; 11 May 1896 – 5 March 1978	17 August 1945	9 October 1945	Prince Naruhiko Higashikuni married on 18 May 1915
28		Masako Shidehara 幣原 雅子; 18 December 1881 – July 1956	9 October 1945	22 May 1946	Kijūrō Shidehara married in 1903
29		Kiyo Yoshida 吉田 喜代; 1904 – 2003	22 May 1946	24 May 1947	Shigeru Yoshida married in 1944
30		Kikue Katayama 片山 菊江; 1894 – 1985	24 May 1947	10 March 1948	Tetsu Katayama married in 1913
31		Sumi Ashida 芦田 壽美; 1895 – died on unknown date	10 March 1948	15 October 1948	Hitoshi Ashida married in 1918
(29)		Kiyo Yoshida 吉田 喜代; 1904 – 2003	15 October 1948	10 December 1954	Shigeru Yoshida married in 1944
32		Kaoru Hatoyama 鳩山 薫 21 November 1888 – 15 August 1982	10 December 1954	23 December 1956	Ichirō Hatoyama married on 18 September 1908
33		Ume Ishibashi 石橋 うめ; 1888 – August 1971	23 December 1956	25 February 1957	Tanzan Ishibashi married in November 1912
34		Yoshiko Kishi 岸 良子; 1901 – 1980	25 February 1957	19 July 1960	Nobusuke Kishi married in November 1919
35		Mitsue Ikeda 池田 滿枝; 1913 – 9 January 2001	19 July 1960	9 November 1964	Hayato Ikeda married on unknown date
36		Hiroko Satō 佐藤 寛子; 5 January 1907 – 16 April 1987	9 November 1964	7 July 1972	Eisaku Satō married in 1926
37		Hana Tanaka 田中 はな; 1910 – 1995	7 July 1972	9 December 1974	Kakuei Tanaka married in 1942
38		Mutsuko Miki 三木 睦子; 31 July 1917 – 31 July 2012	9 December 1974	24 December 1976	Takeo Miki married in 1940
39		Mie Fukuda 福田 三枝; 14 February 1912 – 16 September 2013	24 December 1976	7 December 1978	Takeo Fukuda married in 1933
40		Shigeko Ōhira 大平 志げ子; 1916 – 1990	7 December 1978	12 June 1980	Masayoshi Ōhira married on 15 April 1937
41		Sachi Suzuki 鈴木 さち; 1919 – 22 March 2015	12 June 1980	27 November 1982	Zenkō Suzuki married on 2 November 1939
42		Tsutako Nakasone 中曾根 蔦子; 30 October 1921 – 7 November 2012	27 November 1982	6 November 1987	Yasuhiro Nakasone married on 11 February 1945
43		Naoko Takeshita 竹下 直子; 9 September 1926 – 20 September 2010	6 November 1987	3 June 1989	Noboru Takeshita married in 1946
44		Chiyo Uno 宇野 千代; 1 November 1924 – 10 August 2015	3 June 1989	10 August 1989	Sōsuke Uno married on 22 February 1947
45		Sachiyo Kaifu 海部 幸世 born 30 April 1933	10 August 1989	5 November 1991	Toshiki Kaifu married in 1955
46		Yoko Miyazawa 宮澤 庸子; 18 February 1920 — 4 May 2014	5 November 1991	9 August 1993	Kiichi Miyazawa married on 30 November 1943
47		Kayoko Hosokawa 細川 佳代子 born 14 September 1942	9 August 1993	28 April 1994	Morihiro Hosokawa married in 1971
48		Ayako Hata 羽田 綏子 born 1949	28 April 1994	30 June 1994	Tsutomu Hata married on 5 December 1965
49		Yoshie Murayama 村山 ヨシヱ; 28 October 1923 — December 2024	30 June 1994	11 January 1996	Tomiichi Murayama married in 1953
50		Kumiko Hashimoto 橋本 久美子 born 1941	11 January 1996	30 July 1998	Ryutaro Hashimoto married in 1966
51		Chizuko Obuchi 小渕 千鶴子 born 16 August 1940	30 July 1998	5 April 2000	Keizō Obuchi married in 1967
52		Chieko Mori 森 智恵子 born 24 January 1937	5 April 2000	26 April 2001	Yoshirō Mori married in November 1961
–	Vacant		26 April 2001	26 September 2006	Junichirō Koizumi
53		Akie Abe 安倍 昭恵 born 10 June 1962	26 September 2006	26 September 2007	Shinzo Abe married in June 1987
54		Kiyoko Fukuda 福田 貴代子 born 13 January 1944	26 September 2007	24 September 2008	Yasuo Fukuda married in 1966
55		Chikako Asō 麻生 千賀子 born 30 May 1950	24 September 2008	16 September 2009	Tarō Asō married in 1983
56		Miyuki Hatoyama 鳩山 幸 born 28 June 1943	16 September 2009	8 June 2010	Yukio Hatoyama married in 1975
57		Nobuko Kan 菅 伸子 born 3 October 1945	8 June 2010	2 September 2011	Naoto Kan married in 1970
58		Hitomi Noda 野田 仁実 born 7 June 1963	2 September 2011	26 December 2012	Yoshihiko Noda married in 1992
(53)		Akie Abe 安倍 昭恵 born 10 June 1962	26 December 2012	16 September 2020	Shinzo Abe married in June 1987
59		Mariko Suga 菅 真理子 born 28 November 1953	16 September 2020	4 October 2021	Yoshihide Suga married on unknown date
60		Yuko Kishida 岸田 裕子 born 15 August 1964	4 October 2021	1 October 2024	Fumio Kishida married in 1988
61		Yoshiko Ishiba 石破 佳子 born 26 August 1956	1 October 2024	21 October 2025	Shigeru Ishiba married in 1983
62		Taku Yamamoto 山本 拓 born 7 July 1952	21 October 2025	Incumbent	Sanae Takaichi married in 2004; remarried in 2021
