= Akie Abe =

Spouse of the Japanese Prime Minister (2006–2007; 2012–2020)

- 安倍 昭恵
- Akie Abe in 2026

Spouse of the Prime Minister of Japan
- In role 26 December 2012 – 16 September 2020
- Monarchs: Akihito; Naruhito
- Prime Minister: Shinzo Abe
- Preceded by: Hitomi Noda
- Succeeded by: Mariko Suga
- In role 26 September 2006 – 26 September 2007
- Monarch: Akihito
- Prime Minister: Shinzo Abe
- Preceded by: Chieko Mori
- Succeeded by: Kiyoko Fukuda

Personal details
- Born: Akie Matsuzaki; 10 June 1962 (age 64) Tokyo, Japan
- Party: Liberal Democratic Party
- Spouse: Shinzo Abe (m. 1987; died 2022)
- Education: Sacred Heart Professional Training College; Rikkyo University

Akie Abe (安倍 昭恵, Abe Akie; née Matsuzaki; born 10 June 1962) is the widow of Shinzo Abe, who served as Prime Minister of Japan from 2006 to 2007 and again from 2012 to 2020.

== Early life ==
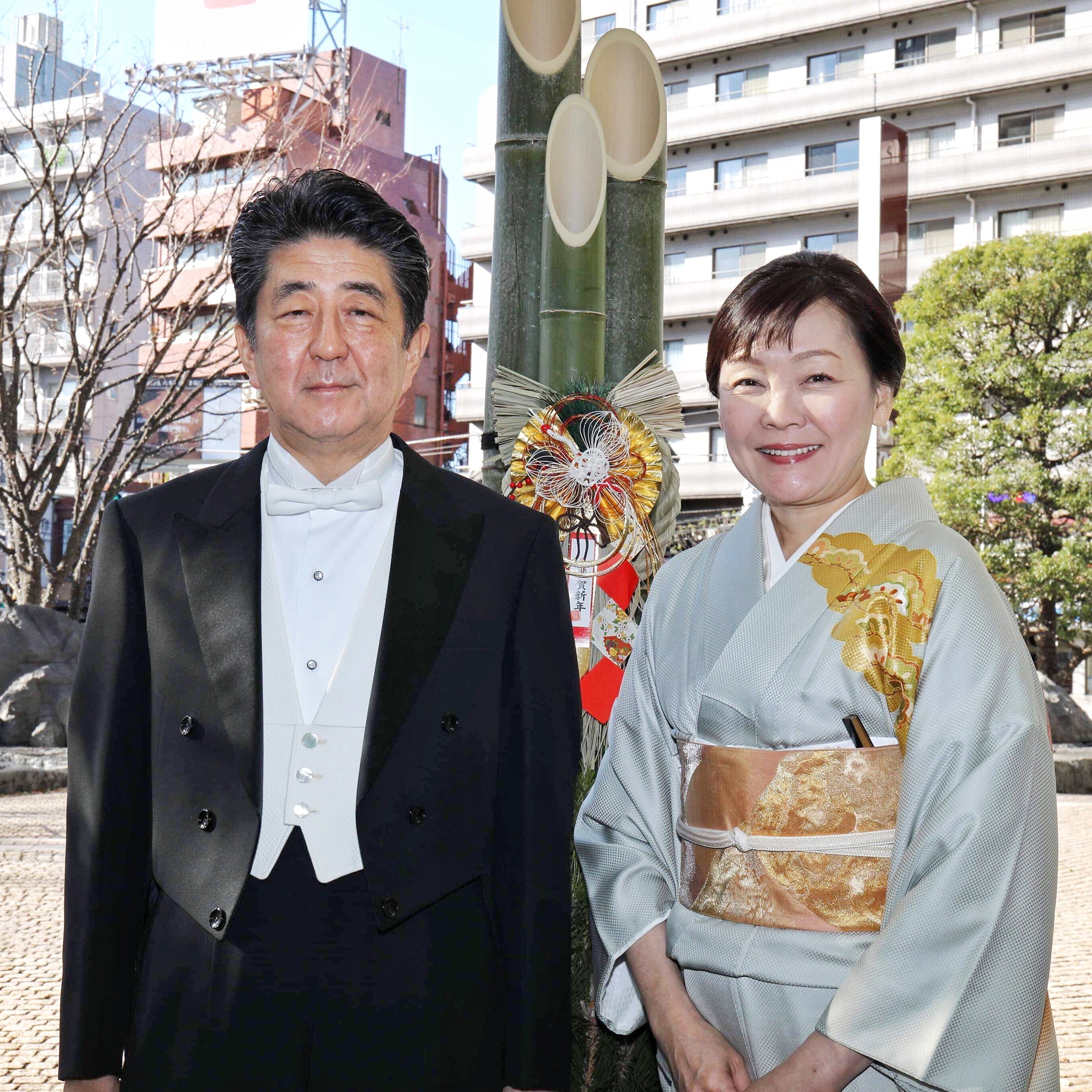
Akie with her husband, 1 January 2020

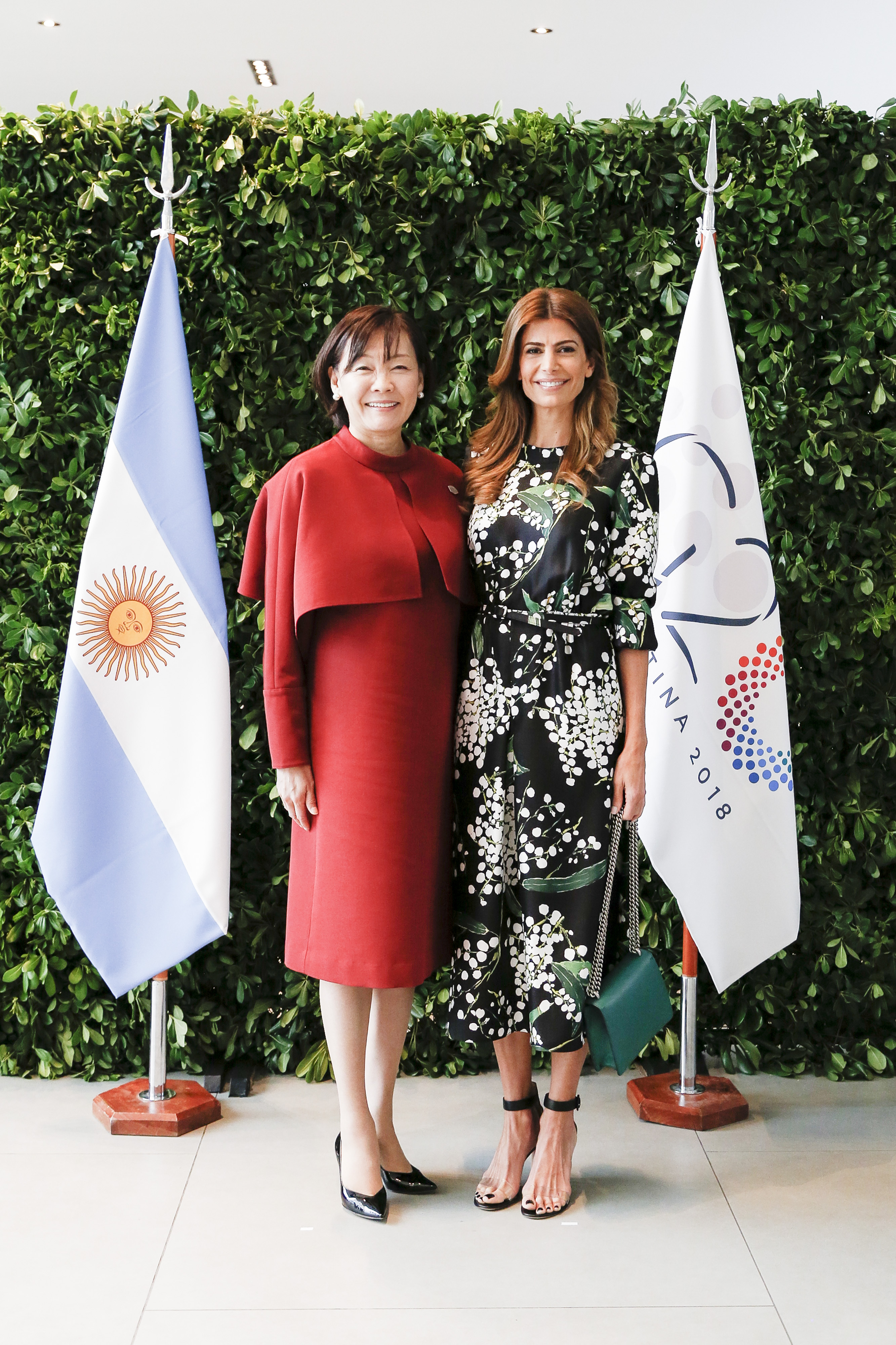
Akie with Juliana Awada, First Lady of Argentina, November 2018

Akie was born Akie Matsuzaki (松崎 昭恵, Matsuzaki Akie). Her father Akio Matsuzaki was president of Morinaga & Co., one of Japan's largest confectionery companies, and her mother belonged to the founding Morinaga family. The Matsuzaki and Morinaga families had close ties since the Meiji era.

She was educated at Sacred Heart School in Tokyo (or Seishin Joshi Gakuin), a Roman Catholic private elementary through high school, then graduated from Sacred Heart Professional Training College. Akie later worked for Dentsu Inc., the world's largest advertising agency, before marrying Shinzo Abe in 1987. The couple had no children, having undergone unsuccessful fertility treatments earlier in their marriage. The two would remain married until Shinzo's assassination on 8 July 2022.

In the late 1990s, Akie worked as a radio disc jockey in her husband's hometown of Shimonoseki. She was popular in the broadcast area and was known by her jockey name, "Akky".

== Public life ==
Following her husband's first stint as prime minister, she opened an organic izakaya in the Kanda district of Tokyo, but was not active in management due to the urging of her mother-in-law. She received a master's degree in Social Design Studies from Rikkyo University in March 2011.

Akie became popularly known as the "domestic opposition party" due to her outspoken views, which often contradicted her husband's. Akie is also known as a supporter of sexual minorities and the LGBT community. On 27 April 2014, she joined the gay pride parade in Tokyo to show her support for broader rights to Japan's LGBT community. In 2015, she was photographed standing in a field of cannabis plants promoting the revival of the cannabis culture in Japan.

While her husband was in office, Akie developed a close relationship with the Moritomo Gakuen kindergarten in Osaka, which is noted for its conservative culture, including requiring students to memorize the Imperial Rescript on Education. Akie was named as honorary principal of Mizuho no Kuni, an elementary school under development by Moritomo Gakuen, but resigned in February 2017 after it was discovered that Moritomo Gakuen had purchased the land for the school from the government for 14% of its appraised value. The Moritomo Gakuen scandal highlighted the complicated role of the prime minister's wife in Japan: although Akie herself was not considered a civil servant, she was supported by a staff of five civil servants seconded from the Ministry of Foreign Affairs and the Ministry of Economy, Trade and Industry, thus implying that her role carries public duties.

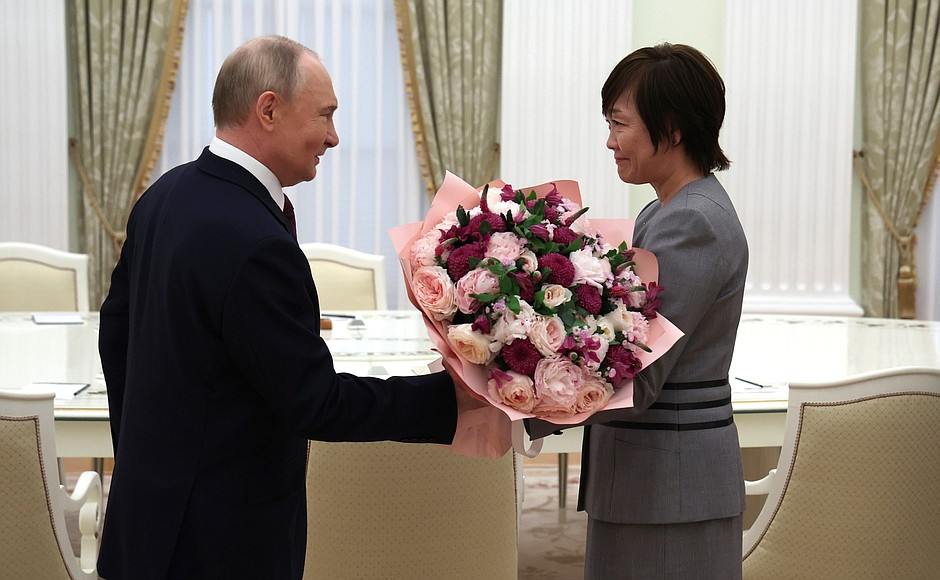
Abe with Russian President Vladimir Putin in Moscow on 29 May 2025

Akie was the first spouse of a Japanese prime minister to actively use social media, and was particularly personally active on Facebook and Instagram, but dramatically reduced her social media activities and changed the style of her posts in the wake of the Moritomo Gakuen scandal.

After Shinzo Abe's assassination, Akie Abe declined the possibility of running as his replacement in Yamaguchi 4th district. She took the lead in supporting Shimonoseki city councilman Shinji Yoshida as a candidate and was at the forefront of his campaign. Yoshida was elected in an April 2023 by-election. In June, Abe became chairwoman of Yoshida's koenkai.

In December 2024, Abe became one of the first foreign officials to meet with U.S. President-elect Donald Trump and his wife Melania Trump over a private dinner at his Mar-a-Lago resort in Florida.

In May 2026, Abe became chairwoman of the Yasukuni Shrine Worshippers' Association (靖国神社崇敬奉賛会, Yasukuni Jinja Sukeihousankai).

Unofficial roles
Vacant Title last held by Chieko Mori	Spouse of the Prime Minister of Japan; 2006–2007	Succeeded by Kiyoko Fukuda
Preceded by Hitomi Noda	Spouse of the Prime Minister of Japan; 2012–2020	Succeeded by Mariko Suga
