= Sacred Heart Professional Training College =

- 聖心女子専門学校
- Type: Private vocational school
- Established: 1908
- Faculty: English, early childhood education
- Location: Minato, Tokyo, Japan
- Website: www.sen-sacred-heart.ac.jp

Sacred Heart Professional Training College (聖心女子専門学校, Seishin Joshi Senmon Gakkō) was a private vocational school in Minato, Tokyo, Japan.

== History ==
The origin of the school was founded in 1908. It was chartered as a vocational school in 1976.

== Courses ==
- English
- Early childhood education

== Notable former students ==
- Akie Abe, wife of Shinzō Abe, the Prime Minister of Japan

== See also ==
- University of the Sacred Heart (Japan)
