= Taku Yamamoto =

Spouse of the Japanese Prime Minister since 2025

- 山本 拓
- Official portrait, 2006

Spouse of the Prime Minister of Japan
- Assumed role 21 October 2025
- Monarch: Naruhito
- Prime Minister: Sanae Takaichi
- Preceded by: Yoshiko Ishiba

Member of the House of Representatives
- In office 9 November 2003 – 14 October 2021
- Preceded by: Takamori Makino
- Succeeded by: Multi-member district
- Constituency: Fukui 2nd (2003–2014); Hokuriku-Shin'etsu PR (2014–2021)
- In office 18 February 1990 – 27 September 1996
- Preceded by: Multi-member constituency
- Succeeded by: Constituency abolished
- Constituency: Fukui at-large

Member of the Fukui Prefectural Assembly
- In office 22 April 1983 – 17 February 1990
- Constituency: Sabae City

Personal details
- Born: Taku Yamamoto; 7 July 1952 (age 74) Sabae, Fukui, Japan
- Party: Liberal Democratic (until 1994; 2000–present)
- Other political affiliations: New Frontier (1994–1996); Independent (1996–2000)
- Spouse: Sanae Takaichi (m. 2004; div. 2017) (m. 2021)
- Children: 3
- Education: Hosei University
- Occupation: Linguist • politician

Taku Yamamoto (Japanese: 山本 拓, Hepburn: Yamamoto Taku; born 7 July 1952), legally Taku Takaichi (高市 拓, Takaichi Taku), is a Japanese former politician of the Liberal Democratic Party who served as a member of the House of Representatives from 1990 to 1996 and again from 2003 to 2021. He is the husband of Sanae Takaichi, who has served as Prime Minister of Japan and President of the Liberal Democratic Party since 2025; thus, he became the first male prime ministerial spouse.

== Political career ==
Yamamoto was a member of the House of Representatives until 2021, when he lost his seat. A native of Sabae, Fukui and graduate of Hosei University. He was elected to the first of his two terms in the assembly of Fukui Prefecture in 1983, and to the House of Representatives for the first time in 1990. After losing his seat in 1996, he ran unsuccessfully for the governorship of Fukui Prefecture in 1999. He was re-elected to the House of Representatives in 2003.

== Personal life ==
He married Sanae Takaichi, a fellow member of the House of Representatives, in 2004. Yamamoto's younger brother served as a parliamentary aide in her office. They agreed to a divorce in July 2017, with Takaichi citing differing political views and aspirations as the reason for the divorce. However, they rekindled their marriage in December 2021, and he adopted Takaichi's surname. She became president of the Liberal Democratic Party and ultimately prime minister of Japan in 2025, the first woman in the roles.

His eldest son, Ken Yamamoto, serves as a prefectural assembly member in Fukui.

=== Health ===
Yamamoto was diagnosed with prostate cancer in 2024 and suffered from a cerebral infarction in 2025, leaving the right side of his body unable to move. Takaichi serves as his carer.

== See also ==
- List of spouses of prime ministers of Japan

House of Representatives (Japan)
Preceded by Toshio Kojima	Chair, Lower House Special Committee on North Korean Abductions and Other Issues; 2007–2008	Succeeded by Takuji Yanagimoto
Preceded by Yuji Yamamoto	Chair, Lower House Committee on Discipline; 2012	Succeeded by Shoichi Kondo
Preceded by Okiharu Yasuoka	Chair, Lower House Special Committee on North Korean Abductions and Other Issues; 2012–2014	Succeeded by Katsuei Hirasawa
Preceded by Okiharu Yasuoka	Chair, Lower House Special Committee on Political Ethics and Election Law; 2014–2016	Succeeded by Koichi Yamamoto
Political offices
Preceded by Mitsuhiro Miyakoshi, Issui Miura	Senior Vice Minister of Agriculture, Forestry and Fisheries; 2006–2007; Served alongside: Masayuki Kunii	Succeeded by Masahiro Imamura, Hiromi Iwanaga
Unofficial roles
Preceded by Yoshiko Ishiba	Spouse of the Prime Minister of Japan; 2025–present	Incumbent
