= Yuko Kishida =

Spouse of the Japanese Prime Minister from 2021 to 2024

- 岸田裕子
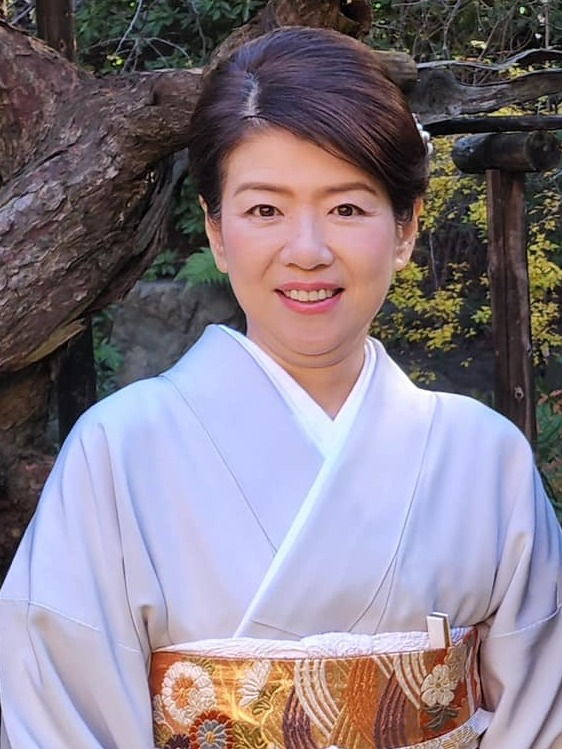
- Kishida in 2023

Spouse of the Prime Minister of Japan
- In role 4 October 2021 – 1 October 2024
- Monarch: Naruhito
- Prime Minister: Fumio Kishida
- Preceded by: Mariko Suga
- Succeeded by: Yoshiko Ishiba

Personal details
- Born: Yuko Wada (和田裕子); 15 August 1964 (age 62) Miyoshi, Hiroshima, Japan
- Spouse: Fumio Kishida (m. 1988)
- Children: 3 (three sons)
- Education: Tokyo Women's Christian University (BA)

Yuko Kishida (岸田 裕子, Kishida Yūko; née Wada; born 15 August 1964) is the wife of the former Prime Minister of Japan, Fumio Kishida.

== Biography ==
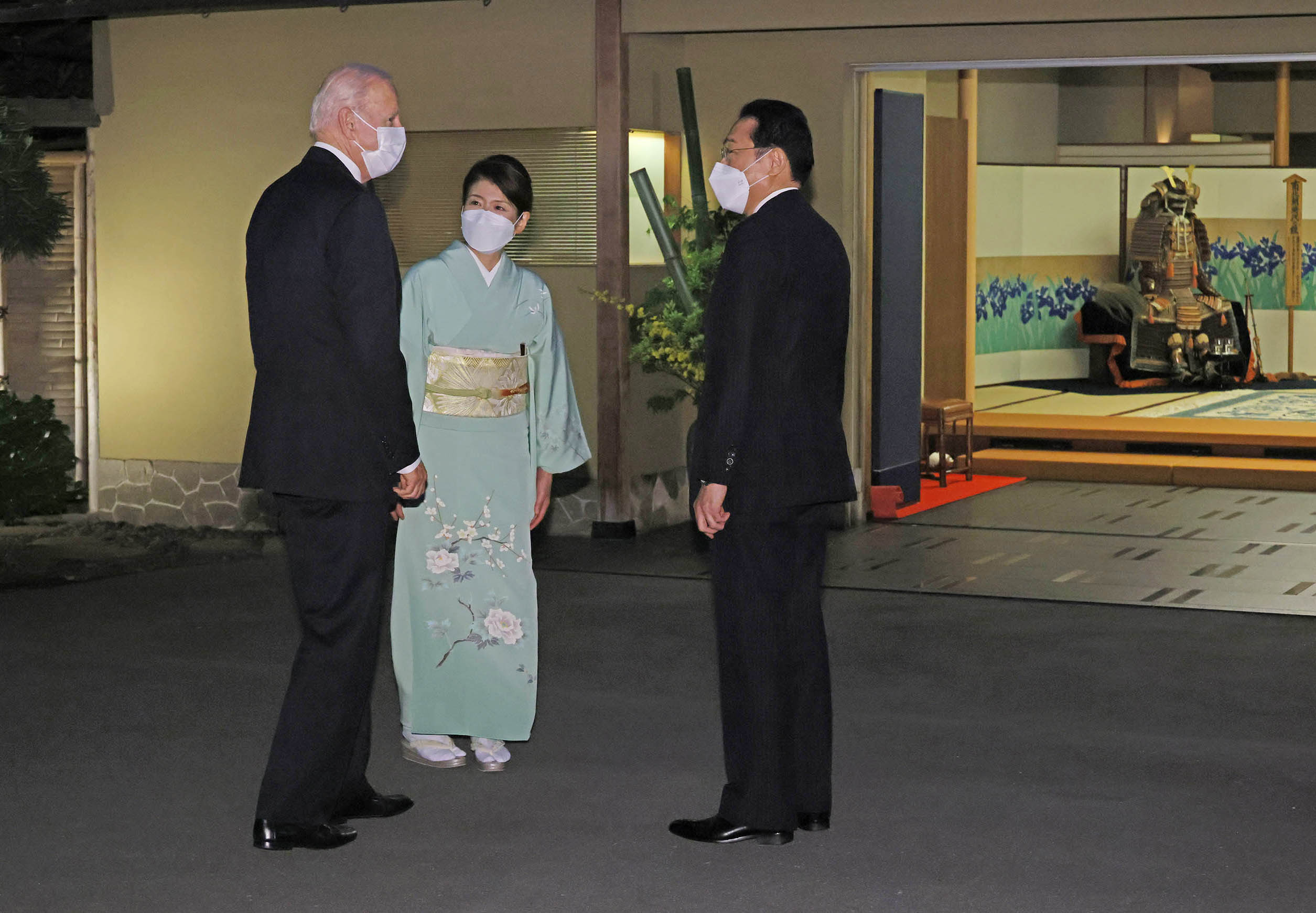
Yuko and Fumio Kishida with U.S. President Joe Biden (May 2022).

Kishida was born in Miyoshi City, Hiroshima Prefecture, as the eldest daughter of Kunijirō Wada, a real estate company owner.

She attended Hiroshima Jogakuin Junior and Senior High School, an integrated junior and senior high school. After graduating from high school, she attended Tokyo Women's Christian University to study Japanese literature. She joined Mazda to work as secretary of vice president Yoshihiro Wada in 1987 after graduating from TWCU. She married Fumio Kishida in 1988 and has three sons with him.

On 4 October 2021, she became the First Lady of Japan because her husband became the 100th Prime Minister of Japan after winning the 2021 Liberal Democratic Party (Japan) leadership election.

=== Solo visit to the United States ===
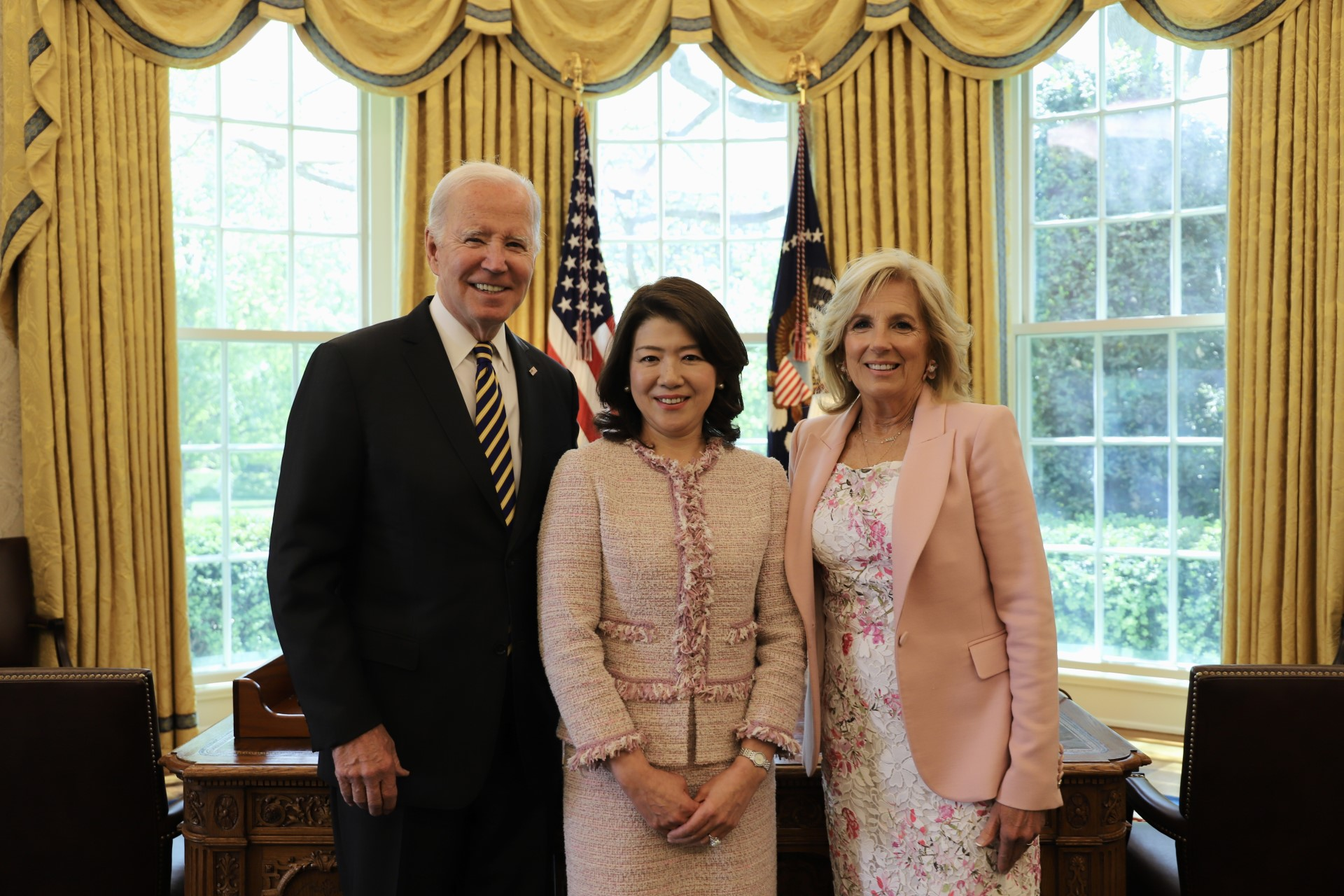
Kishida with Joe and Jill Biden at the Oval Office, the White House (April 2023)

On 17 April 2023, Yuko Kishida traveled solo to the United States at the invitation of the First Lady, Jill Biden, making her the first spouse of a Japanese Prime Minister to have made a solo visit to the United States.

During her visit, Kishida and Jill Biden planted a cherry blossom tree within the White House grounds as a symbol of the enduring friendship between the United States and Japan. Before the planting ceremony, Jill Biden gave Kishida a tour of the White House, including the Oval Office, where she had the opportunity to briefly converse with U.S. President Joe Biden.

Kishida also visited Howard University, a distinguished historically Black university in Washington, D.C. There, she engaged with students who were studying Japanese.

Unofficial roles
Preceded by Mariko Suga	Spouse of the Prime Minister of Japan; 2021–2024	Succeeded by Yoshiko Ishiba
