= Mariko Suga =

Spouse of the Japanese Prime Minister from 2020 to 2021

- 菅 真理子
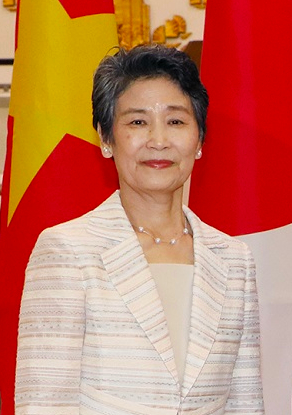
- Suga during a state visit of her husband to Vietnam in 2020

Spouse of the Prime Minister of Japan
- In role 16 September 2020 – 4 October 2021
- Prime Minister: Yoshihide Suga
- Preceded by: Akie Abe
- Succeeded by: Yuko Kishida

Personal details
- Born: November 28, 1953 (age 72) Shimizu, Shizuoka, Japan
- Spouse: Yoshihide Suga
- Children: 3

Mariko Suga (菅 真理子, Suga Mariko; born 28 November 1953) is the wife of the former Prime Minister of Japan, Yoshihide Suga.

== Biography ==
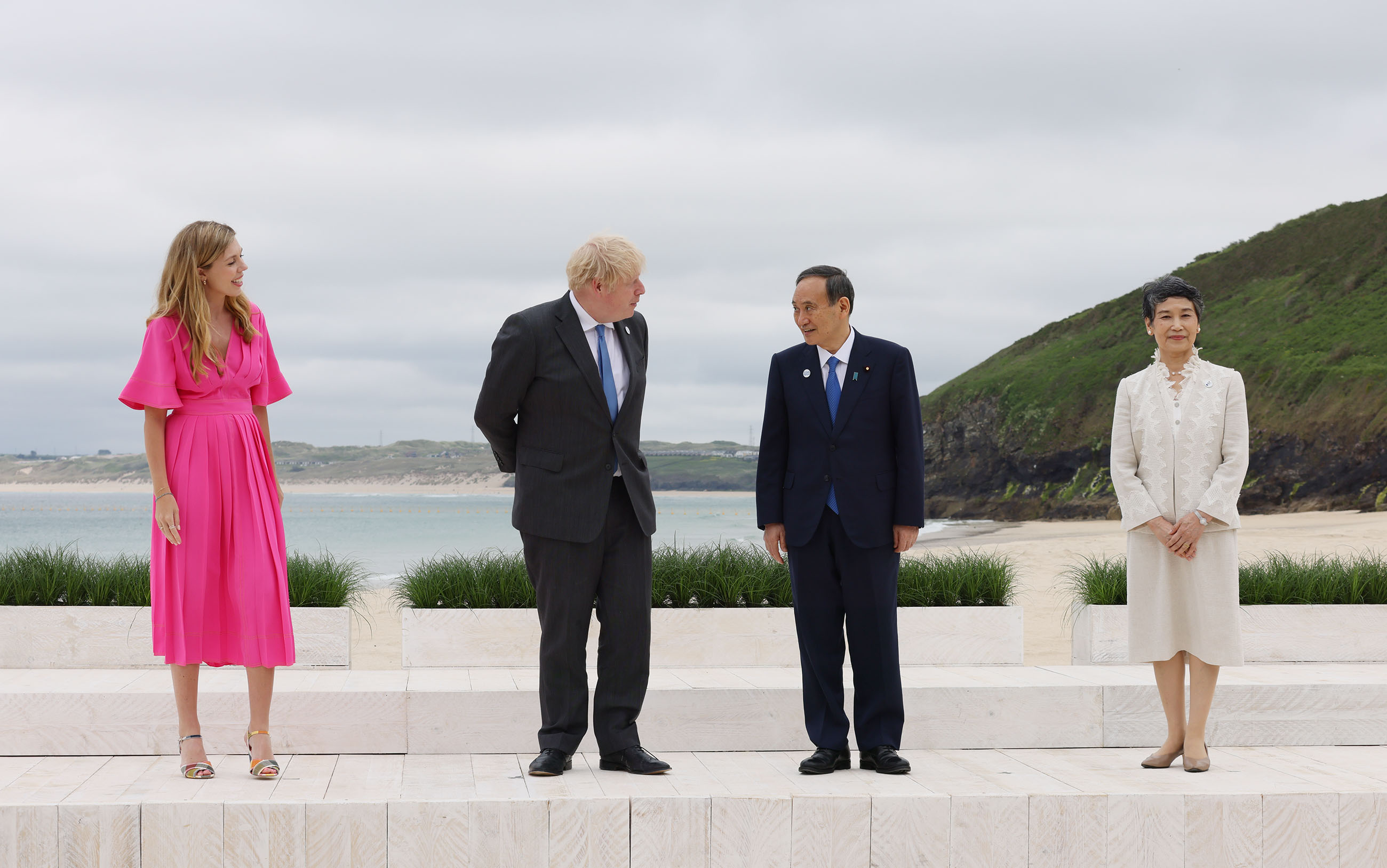
Carrie Johnson, Boris Johnson, Yoshihide Suga and Mariko Suga at Carbis Bay attending the 47th G7 summit in Cornwall, United Kingdom.

Mariko Suga was born on 28 November 1953, in Shimizu, Shizuoka Prefecture, where her family ran a food wholesale business. She attended Shimizu Higashi High School and was a member of its archery club. Afterwards, she studied home economics at Shizuoka Women's University.

Suga worked as a live-in housekeeper in the home of politician Hikosaburo Okonogi. Her younger sister worked for Okonogi as a secretary. During this time, she met and soon married Yoshihide Suga, who was her sister's co-worker, also working as a secretary to Hikosaburo Okonogi. Mariko Suga became a housewife after marrying and the couple had three sons.

Yoshihide Suga subsequently became a Yokohama city councilman in 1987, a member of the House of Representatives in 1996 and rose to prominence as the long-serving Chief Cabinet Secretary under Prime Minister Shinzo Abe from 2012. Yoshihide Suga was appointed Prime Minister to succeed Abe in September 2020 and served until October 2021.

Unofficial roles
Preceded by Akie Abe	Spouse of the Prime Minister of Japan; 2020–2021	Succeeded by Yuko Kishida
