= Mizuho no Kuni Elementary School =

Planned school in Toyonaka, Japan

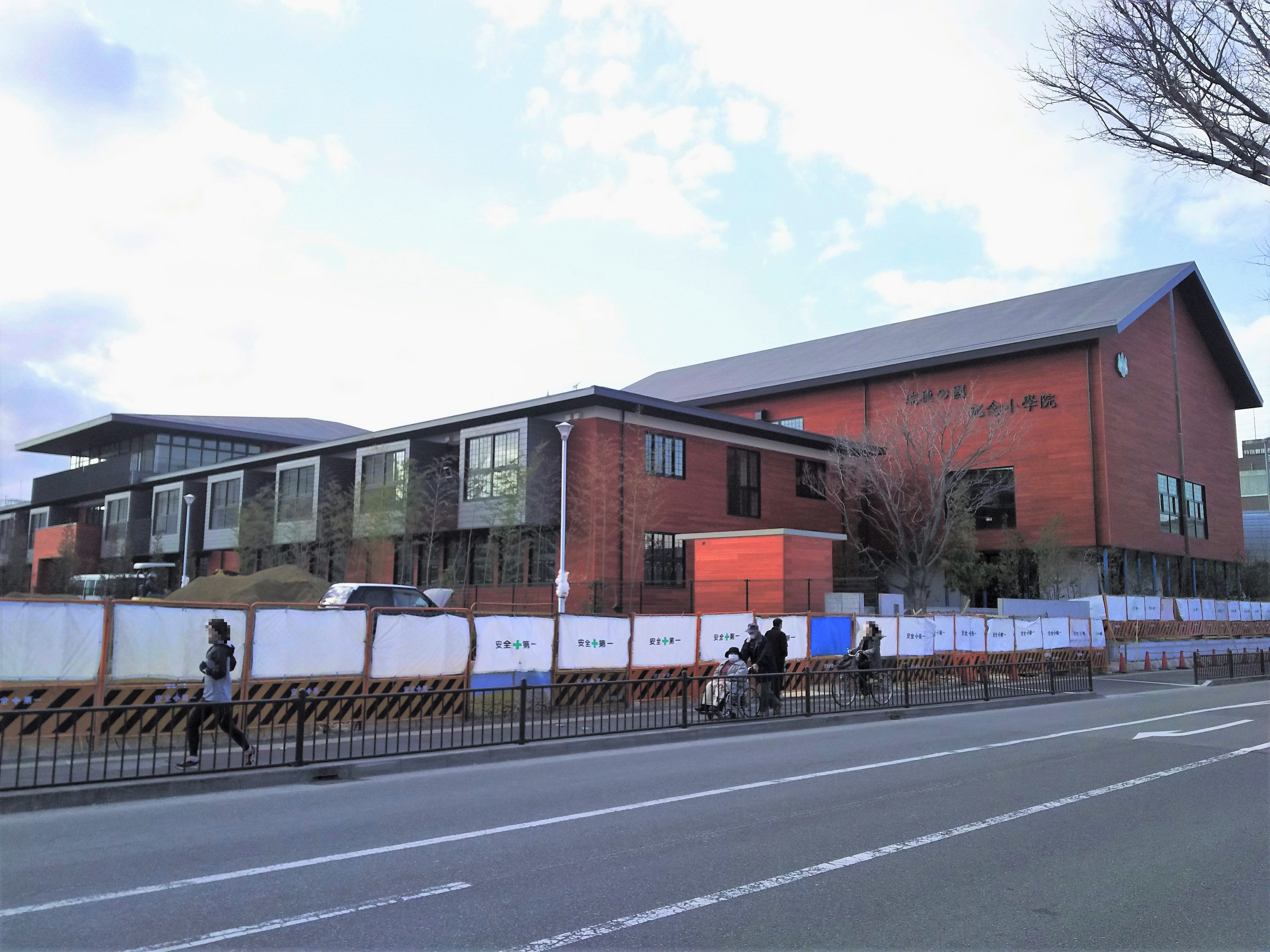
- Under construction

Location
- Toyonaka City, Osaka Prefecture, Japan
- Coordinates: 34°45′18″N 135°28′16″E

Information
- Website: www.mizuhonokuni.ed.jp

Mizuho no Kuni Elementary School (瑞穂の國記念小學院, Mizuho no Kuni Kinenshōgakuin) was going to be a private elementary school to be opened in Toyonaka City, Osaka Prefecture. Its backing corporation has been described as ″ultra-nationalist″. Akie Abe, wife of prime minister Shinzō Abe, was honorary principal but resigned after it was revealed that the school had bought land from the government at only 14% of its real value.

== Background ==
On October 31, 2014, Moritomo Gakuen, a school corporation, applied to the Osaka prefecture for the establishment of an elementary school. The school is about 8700 square meters, with a gymnasium and a three-storey building whose architecture was in meant to evocate the 1701 Shizutani School. The request was accepted on January 27, 2015.

The school corporation, Moritomo Gakuen, bases its education on the 1890 Imperial Rescript on Education. Its president, Yasunori Kagoike, was in the past the Osaka branch leader of Nippon Kaigi, an ultra-conservative political lobby group that includes Shinzō Abe and his wife in its membership as well as more than a dozen members of the Japanese Cabinet. It has been operating a kindergarten called Tsukamoto Yōchien since 1950, where children from three to five are required to sing the Kimigayo every day. A sport event of the kindergarten had pupils with arms raised recitate a text calling Shinzō Abe to do his best, calling Japan to not ″lose″ to other countries in territorial disputes, denouncing Korea and China for giving a bad image to Japan, calling for lies not to be taught in schoolbooks, and celebrating the Legislation for Peace and Security.

When raising funds for the school, Moritomo first called the school "Shinzō Abe Memorial Elementary School", but Abe objected to the use of his name, so the school was named Mizuho no Kuni (″land of fruitful rice ears″, an old name for Japan) instead. The school song was to be ″Aa, seishun no mune no chi wa″, theme of an eponymous 1964 movie by Kenjirō Morinaga.

== Controversy ==
In February 2017, Japanese media revealed that the school had bought its land for ¥134 million, which is only 14% of what the land's estimated value. An adjacent piece of land of similar size was sold at the same time for ¥1.423 billion, also by the government. It has been learned that the government is set to buy back the land, citing that since the school operator gave up on opening the school on March 10.
