= Moritomo Gakuen =

Japanese private school operator

- Native name: 学校法人森友学園
- Romanized name: Gakkō hōjin Moritomo Gakuen
- Founded: August 25, 1952; 73 years ago

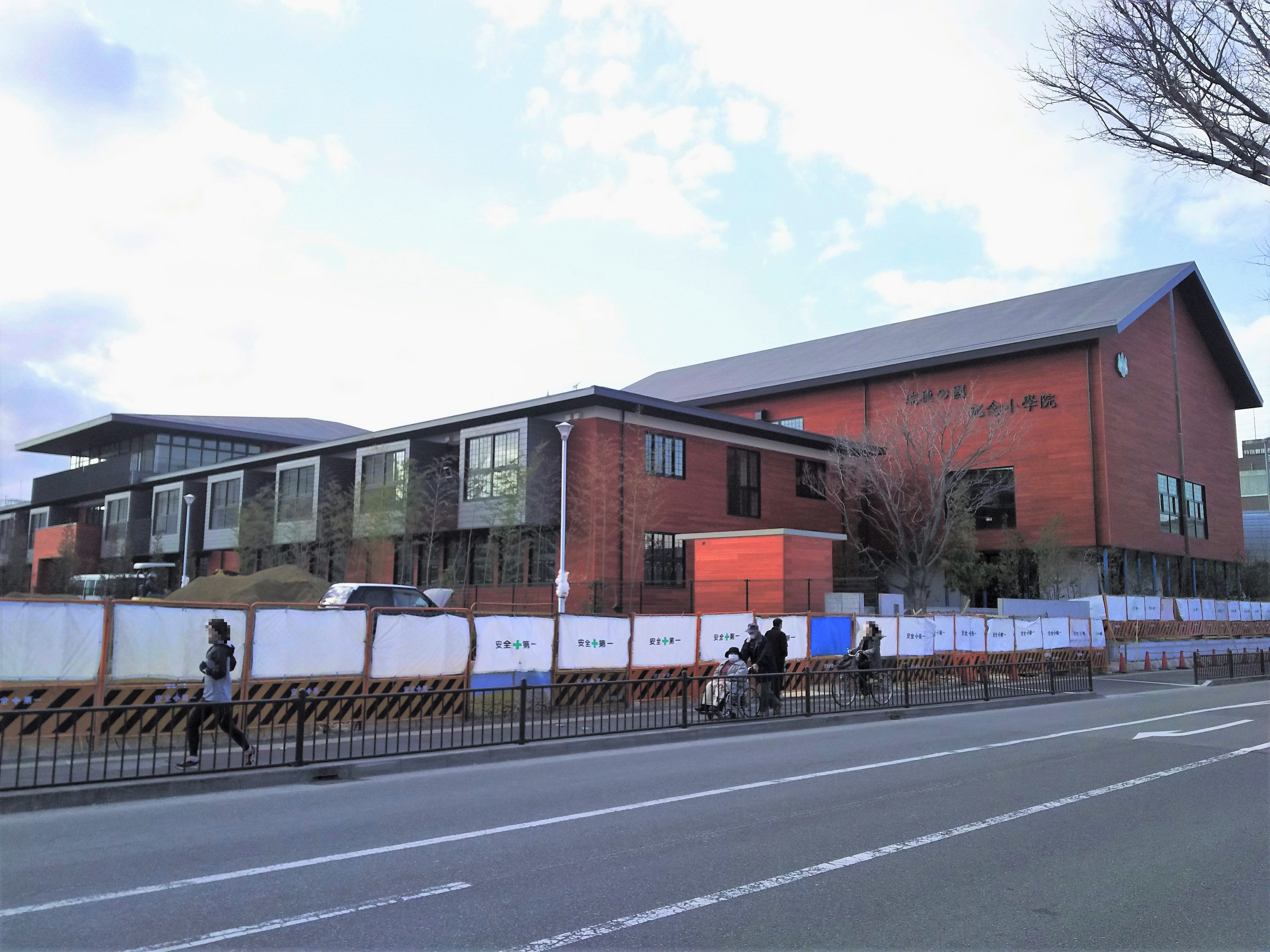
Mizuho no Kuni school under construction

Moritomo Gakuen (学校法人森友学園, Gakkō hōjin Moritomo Gakuen) is a Japanese private school operator, most known for its involvement in a 2017 political scandal implicating former Prime Minister Shinzō Abe and his wife, Akie.

Moritomo Gakuen began as a kindergarten (preschool) operated by Yasunori Kagoike. Kagoike implemented a nationalist curriculum at the school which included daily recitations of the Imperial Rescript on Education, a practice employed at schools in the Empire of Japan from 1890 to 1945. Moritomo Gakuen is controversial about teaching anti-Korean education.

== Elementary school scandal ==
Kagoike sought to expand the kindergarten into a full-fledged Japanese elementary school and applied to buy a parcel of government-owned real estate in 2013, but was turned down as he could not pay a satisfactory price to the government.

In May 2015, he was able to negotiate a 10-year lease for the property provided that the school purchase the property in ten years. The school named Akie Abe as honorary principal of the elementary school, Mizuho no Kuni.

On February 9, 2017, the scandal began when Asahi Shimbun reported that the central government of Japan had sold the 8,770 square metres (94,400 sq ft) property in Toyonaka, Osaka Prefecture, to Moritomo Gakuen for around ¥134 million, about 14% of the land's estimated value. The Ministry of Finance explained that industrial waste (including concrete, wood and plastic) was found on the site and the reduction in the price of the land was to compensate for the estimated cost of cleaning up the waste, approximately ¥819 million, that the school was to bear. The amount of the discount is the major issue in the scandal. How the ministry calculated the cost is not clear. Separately the government paid the school ¥131.76 million to help decontaminate the land, reducing what the government earned to only about ¥2 million. In Diet hearings later that month, the Ministry of Finance explained that all records of the transaction had been destroyed, other than the contract itself, in compliance with government document retention laws which allowed the documents to be designated for retention for less than one year.

As the scandal unfolded, Abe resigned from her position as honorary principal in late February. Prior to her resignation, Moritomo Gakuen removed a message from Akie endorsing the school, praising its nationalistic moral education program.

Osaka prosecutors eventually suspected that Kagoike and his wife had falsified the numbers of teachers and students at the school, and the expected construction costs, when applying for state subsidies. Kagoike and his wife were arrested in July on charges of fraud.

Former Meiji University law professor Lawrence Repeta argued that the scandal was a factor in the timing of the 2017 general election called by Abe.

== Day care center scandal ==
Osaka City filed suit against Moritomo Gakuen in 2017, demanding the return of over ¥61 million of subsidies improperly received in connection with the Koto Moritomo Gakuen day care center in Yodogawa Ward.

== Bankruptcy ==
Moritomo Gakuen filed for civil rehabilitation (bankruptcy restructuring) proceedings in October 2017, seeking to write off around 97% of its approximately ¥3 billion debt burden.
