= Yoshiko Ishiba =

Spouse of the Japanese Prime Minister from 2024 to 2025

- 石破佳子
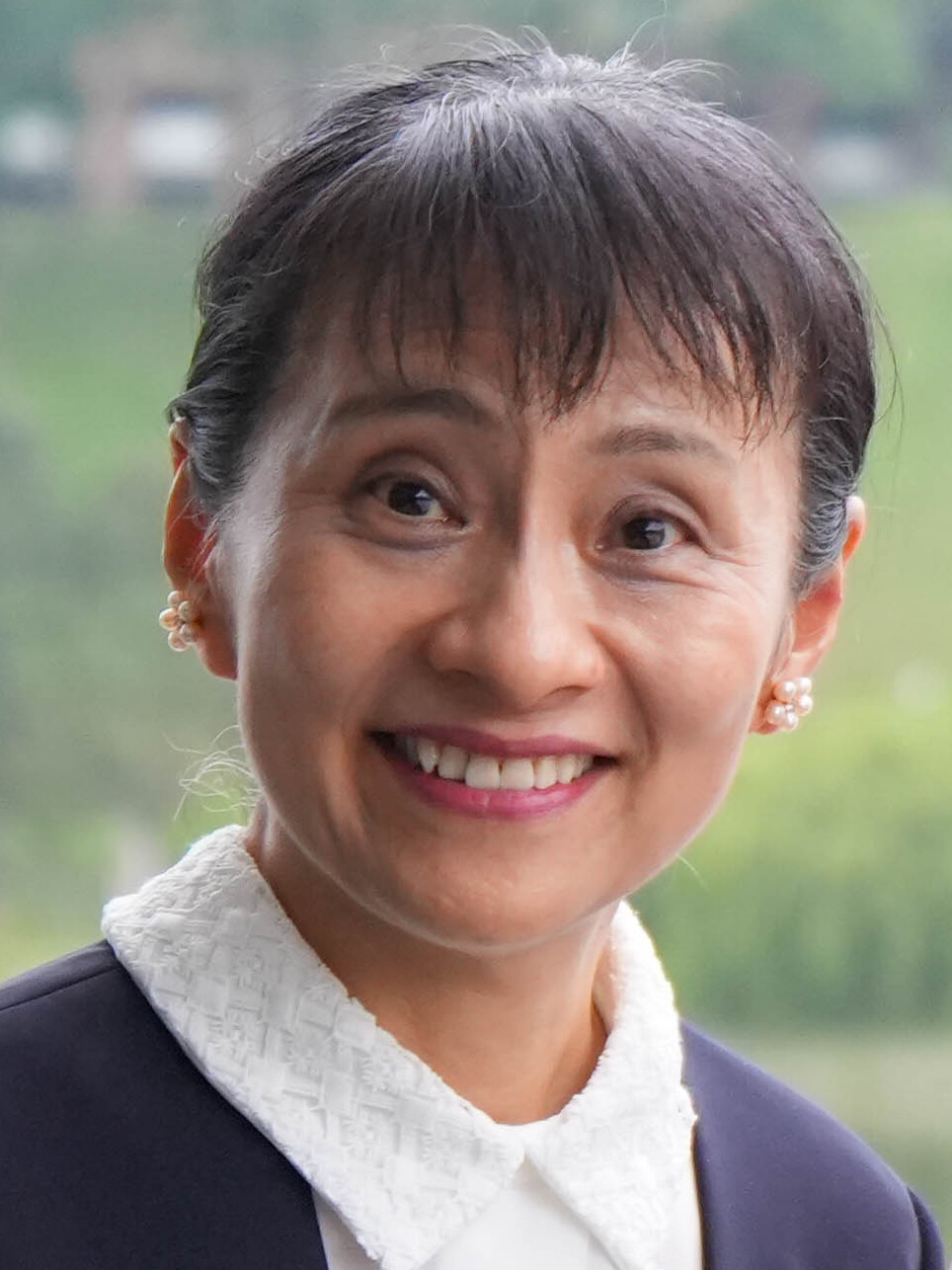
- Ishiba in 2025

Spouse of the Prime Minister of Japan
- In role 1 October 2024 – 21 October 2025
- Monarch: Naruhito
- Prime Minister: Shigeru Ishiba
- Preceded by: Yuko Kishida
- Succeeded by: Taku Yamamoto

Personal details
- Born: Yoshiko Nakamura (中村佳子); 26 August 1956 (age 69) Tokyo, Japan
- Spouse: Shigeru Ishiba (m. 1983)
- Children: 2
- Education: Keio University

Yoshiko Ishiba (Note: Japanese: 石破 佳子 Ishiba Yoshiko) (née Nakamura; born 26 August 1956) is the wife of Shigeru Ishiba, the former prime minister of Japan. She previously worked for Marubeni.

== Biography ==
Ishiba was born in Tokyo, as the second daughter of Akira Nakamura, an employee at Showa Denko.

She attended Joshigakuin Junior and Senior High School, an integrated private junior and senior high school. After graduating from high school, she attended Keio University to study jurisprudence. After graduation, she began working at Marubeni. She married Shigeru Ishiba in 1983 and has two daughters with him.

On 1 October 2024, her husband became the 102nd Prime Minister of Japan after winning the 2024 Liberal Democratic Party presidential election.

== See also ==
- List of spouses of prime ministers of Japan

== Footnotes ==
Unofficial roles
Preceded by Yuko Kishida	Spouse of the Prime Minister of Japan; 2024–2025	Succeeded by Taku Yamamoto
