= Masao Yamaguchi =

Japanese anthropologist

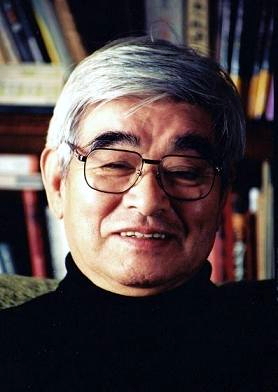
- Born: August 20, 1931; Bihoro, Hokkaidō, Empire of Japan
- Died: March 10, 2013 (aged 81); Mitaka, Tokyo, Japan
- Education: University of Tokyo
- Scientific career
- Fields: Anthropology

Masao Yamaguchi (山口 昌男, Yamaguchi Masao; August 20, 1931 – 10 March 2013) was a Japanese anthropologist.

== Overviews ==
Yamaguchi was born in Bihoro, Hokkaidō. A key figure in the introduction of structural anthropology to Japan, Yamaguchi was also noted for his engagements with political questions such as the Japanese emperor system and assimilation policies. Yamaguchi was also noted as a writer on the concepts of hermaphroditism and the trickster, and performed fieldwork in Asia, Africa, and elsewhere.

== Selected bibliography ==
- 「人類学的思考」("anthropological investigation")
- 「文化と両義性」("culture and duality")
- 「文化の詩学」("The Poetics of Culture")
- 「アフリカの神話的世界」("The African Mythical World")
- 「同化的世界」("An Assimilating World")
- 「知の遠近法」("Perspectives of Knowledge")
- 「仕掛けとしての文化」
- 「文化人類学への招待」("An Invitation to Cultural Anthropology")
- 「同化の民俗学」("The Ethnology of Assimilation")
- 「天皇制の文化人類学」("The Cultural Anthropology of the Emperor System")
- 「「挫折」の昭和史」("A History of Failure in the Showa Period")
- 「「敗者」の精神史」("A Psychological History of Losers')
- 「敗者学のすすめ」("For a study of the losing side")
- 「はみだし（ステップ・アウト）の方法」("Stepping Outside")
- 「内田魯山山脈」
- 「山口昌男ラビリンス」("Yamaguchi Masao Labyrinth")
- 「経営者の精神史」("A Psychological History of the Manager")
