= Opinion polling for the 2021 Japanese general election =

Opinion polling

In the run up to the 2021 Japanese general election, various organisations carried out opinion polling to gauge voting intention. Results of such polls are displayed in this article. The date range for these opinion polls is from the previous general election, held on 22 October 2017 to 31 October 2021.

== Graphical summary ==
The charts below depict party identification polling for the next Japanese general election using a 15-poll moving average.

LDP CDP DP Kōmeitō JCP Japan Innovation Party DPFP SDP LP Reiwa Shinsengumi Kibō no Tō N-Koku

CDP DP Kōmeitō JCP Japan Innovation Party DPFP SDP LP Reiwa Shinsengumi Kibō no Tō N-Koku

== Party identification ==
=== 2021 ===
| Fieldwork date | Polling firm | LDP | CDP | Kōmeitō | JCP | Ishin | DPFP | SDP | Reiwa | N-Koku | Others | No party | Und./ no ans. | Lead |
|---|---|---|---|---|---|---|---|---|---|---|---|---|---|---|
| 31 Oct 2021 | 2021 general election | 34.7 | 20.0 | 12.4 | 7.3 | 14.0 | 4.5 | 1.8 | 3.9 | 1.4 | 1.7 | —N/a | —N/a | 14.7 |
| 23–24 Oct | go2senkyo | 32.2 | 14.8 | 6.1 | 4.9 | 6.9 | 1.1 | 1.0 | 0.6 | 0.3 | | 32.2 | | Tied |
| 22-24 Oct | NHK | 38.6 | 8.0 | 4.3 | 2.9 | 3.5 | 0.8 | 0.7 | 0.8 | 0.2 | 0.2 | 31.4 | 8.5 | 7.2 |
| 19–20 Oct | Mainichi Shimbun | 41 | 14 | 4 | 6 | 6 | 1 | 1 | 2 | 1 | 1 | 23 | | 18 |
| 19–20 Oct | Asahi Shimbun | 34 | 7 | 4 | 3 | 3 | 1 | 0 | 0 | 0 | 1 | 34 | 13 | Tied |
| 16–17 Oct | Kyodo News | 49.1 | 10.4 | 3.1 | 4.7 | 4.3 | | | | | | 18.8 | | 30.3 |
| 16–17 Oct | go2senkyo (Note: Internet Survey excluded) | 31.6 | 11.8 | 4.7 | 5.6 | 4.0 | 1.0 | 1.2 | 0.3 | 0.3 | | 39.4 | | 7.8 |
| 16–17 Oct | ANN | 49.9 | 12.1 | 4.1 | 4.4 | 2.3 | 1.2 | 0.6 | 0.6 | 0.4 | 0.8 | 23.6 | | 26.3 |
| 15–17 Oct | NHK | 38.8 | 6.6 | 3.9 | 2.8 | 2.3 | 1.0 | 0.6 | 0.6 | 0.1 | 0.2 | 36.2 | 6.9 | 2.6 |
| 14–15 Oct | Yomiuri Shimbun | 40 | 6 | 3 | 3 | 3 | 1 | 1 | 0 | | 0 | 38 | 5 | 2 |
| 9–10 Oct | Green Ship | 42.92 | 13.73 | 4.82 | 5.62 | 4.96 | | | | | | 23.23 | | 19.7 |
| 9–10 Oct | FNN-Sankei | 45.3 | 6.4 | 2.4 | 2.5 | 2.6 | 0.5 | 0.5 | 0.3 | 0.1 | 0.2 | 37.1 | 2.1 | 8.2 |
| 9–10 Oct | JNN | 41.5 | 5.7 | 3.1 | 2.3 | 2.5 | 0.7 | 0.5 | 0.3 | 0 | 0.4 | 38.6 | 4.4 | 2.9 |
| 8–10 Oct | NHK | 41.2 | 6.1 | 4.1 | 2.7 | 1.8 | 0.7 | 0.6 | 0.2 | 0.1 | 0.2 | 36.1 | 6.2 | 5.1 |
| 4–5 Oct | Asahi Shimbun | 37 | 5 | 3 | 3 | 2 | 0 | 0 | 0 | 0 | 0 | 40 | 10 | 3 |
| 4–5 Oct | Yomiuri Shimbun | 43 | 7 | 3 | 3 | 2 | 1 | 0 | 0 | | 0 | 36 | 4 | 7 |
| 4–5 Oct | Nikkei-TV Tokyo | 51 | 8 | 4 | 5 | 3 | 1 | | | | | 27 | | 24 |
| 4 Oct | Fumio Kishida assumes office as the Prime Minister and President of the LDP. | | | | | | | | | | | | | |
| 23–25 Sep | Nikkei | 47 | 8 | 3 | 3 | 3 | 1 | | 1 | | | 30 | 4 | 17 |
| 18–19 Sep | ANN | 49.4 | 9.9 | 4.2 | 4.1 | 3.1 | 1.2 | 0.3 | 0.4 | 0.0 | 0.7 | 26.7 | | 22.7 |
| 18–19 Sep | FNN-Sankei | 43.5 | 6.9 | 3.2 | 2.1 | 1.6 | 0.3 | 0.3 | 0.7 | 0.0 | 0.4 | 34.5 | 6.5 | 9 |
| 18 Sep | Mainichi Shimbun | 37 | 10 | 4 | 4 | 5 | 1 | | 2 | | | 34 | | 3 |
| 10–13 Sep | Jiji Press | 26.5 | 3.0 | 5.0 | 2.2 | 1.7 | 0 | 0.2 | 0.2 | 0.2 | | 59.0 | | 32.5 |
| 11–12 Sep | Asahi Shimbun | 37 | 5 | 3 | 3 | 1 | 0 | 0 | 0 | 0 | 0 | 43 | 8 | 6 |
| 10–12 Sep | NHK | 37.6 | 5.5 | 3.6 | 2.9 | 1.1 | 0.2 | 0.6 | 0.4 | 0.2 | 0.3 | 40.2 | 7.4 | 2.6 |
| 9-11 Sep | Nikkei | 48 | 8 | 2 | 3 | 3 | 1 | 0 | 1 | 0 | | 31 | 3 | 17 |
| 4–5 Sep | Yomiuri Shimbun | 36 | 7 | 3 | 3 | 2 | 0 | 0 | 0 | | | 43 | 5 | 7 |
| 3 Sep | Yoshihide Suga announces he will not seek re-election as President of the LDP. | | | | | | | | | | | | | |
| 28 Aug | Mainichi Shimbun | 26 | 10 | 3 | 5 | 8 | 1 | | 2 | | | 42 | | 16 |
| 21–22 Aug | FNN-Sankei | 35.6 | 6.6 | 3.5 | 2.4 | 3.0 | 0.6 | 0.4 | 0.7 | 0.3 | 0.2 | 44.6 | 4.2 | 9.0 |
| 21–22 Aug | ANN | 46.6 | 8.1 | 2.9 | 4.1 | 2.6 | 0.5 | 0.5 | 0.2 | 0.1 | 0.8 | 33.6 | | 13.0 |
| 14–15 Aug | go2senkyo | 29.1 | 11.1 | 4.1 | 5.6 | 3.5 | 0.5 | 0.6 | 0.9 | 0.0 | | 44.5 | | 15.4 |
| 7–9 Aug | Yomiuri-NNN | 32 | 5 | 3 | 3 | 2 | 0 | 0 | 0 | | 0 | 49 | | 17 |
| 7–9 Aug | NHK | 33.4 | 6.4 | 3.7 | 3.3 | 1.7 | 0.8 | 0.5 | 0.2 | 0.2 | 0.3 | 42.8 | 6.4 | 9.4 |
| 6–9 Aug | Jiji Press | 23.7 | 3.9 | 4.5 | 1.3 | 2.0 | 0.3 | 0.2 | 0.2 | 0.0 | | 61.4 | | 37.7 |
| 7–8 Aug | Asahi Shimbun | 32 | 6 | 2 | 3 | 1 | 1 | 0 | 0 | 0 | 0 | 47 | 8 | 15 |
| 7–8 Aug | JNN | 32.4 | 5.4 | 3.5 | 2.1 | 2.8 | 0.6 | 0.2 | 0.6 | 0 | 0.2 | 48.7 | 3.5 | 16.3 |
| 23–25 Jul | Nikkei | 38 | 9 | 4 | 4 | 4 | 1 | | | | | 35 | 3 | 3 |
| 17–18 Jul | ANN | 42.3 | 8.8 | 3.9 | 2.6 | 2.7 | 0.5 | 0.4 | 0.3 | 0.2 | 0.8 | 37.5 | | 4.8 |
| 17–18 Jul | FNN-Sankei | 36.3 | 8.0 | 2.4 | 3.7 | 2.2 | 0.7 | 0.7 | 0.3 | 0.0 | 0.4 | 41.0 | 4.2 | 4.7 |
| 17 Jul | Mainichi Shimbun | 28 | 10 | 4 | 7 | 6 | 1 | 1 | 1 | 0 | 2 | 39 | | 11 |
| 9–12 Jul | Jiji Press | 21.4 | 4.5 | 2.5 | 1.8 | 2.0 | 0.5 | 0.2 | 0.3 | 0.1 | | 63.9 | | 42.5 |
| 10–11 Jul | go2senkyo | 28.6 | 12.0 | 4.5 | 7.1 | 3.2 | 1.1 | 1.1 | 0.4 | 0.1 | | 41.8 | | 13.2 |
| 9-11 Jul | Yomiuri-NNN | 36 | 5 | 4 | 3 | 2 | 1 | 0 | 0 | 0 | 0 | 43 | 5 | 7 |
| 9-11 Jul | NHK | 34.9 | 6.0 | 3.3 | 3.3 | 2.1 | 0.8 | 0.3 | 0.2 | | 0.8 | 41.9 | 6.3 | 7.0 |
| 3–4 Jul | JNN | 33.6 | 6.1 | 3.5 | 3.4 | 2.1 | 0.6 | 0.4 | 0.4 | 0 | 0.3 | 46.1 | 3.6 | 12.5 |
| 25–27 Jun | Nikkei | 43 | 8 | 3 | 4 | 4 | 1 | 1 | 0 | 0 | —N/a | 31 | 4 | 12 |
| 19–20 Jun | ANN | 41.8 | 8.4 | 3.3 | 3.6 | 3.0 | 1.5 | 0.4 | 1.0 | 0.0 | 1.0 | 36.0 | | 5.8 |
| 19–20 Jun | FNN-Sankei | 37.0 | 8.2 | 2.5 | 2.0 | 2.8 | 0.9 | 0.5 | 0.0 | 0.0 | 0.2 | 43.2 | 2.5 | 6.2 |
| 19–20 Jun | Asahi Shimbun | 31 | 6 | 4 | 3 | 2 | 1 | 0 | 0 | 0 | 0 | 45 | 8 | 14 |
| 19 Jun | Mainichi Shimbun | 30 | 10 | 4 | 6 | 6 | 1 | —N/a | 2 | | | 40 | —N/a | 10 |
| 11–14 Jun | Jiji Press | 22.8 | 2.9 | 3.7 | 1.7 | 1.2 | 0.5 | 0.2 | 0.2 | 0.1 | | 63.2 | —N/a | 40.4 |
| 12–13 Jun | go2senkyo | 25.4 | 13.9 | 4.8 | 5.9 | 2.9 | 0.7 | 0.9 | 0.6 | 0.1 | | 44.7 | —N/a | 19.3 |
| 11–13 Jun | NHK | 35.8 | 6.4 | 3.5 | 2.8 | 2.1 | 0.5 | 0.3 | 0.1 | 0.5 | 0 | 40.6 | 7.4 | 4.8 |
| 5–6 Jun | JNN | 34.3 | 5.8 | 3.5 | 2.3 | 2.7 | 0.5 | 0.2 | 0.7 | 0.2 | 0.3 | 43.9 | 5.5 | 10.4 |
| 4–6 Jun | Yomiuri-NNN | 33 | 5 | 3 | 3 | 2 | 0 | 1 | 0 | | 0 | 48 | 4 | 15 |
| 28–30 May | Nikkei | 42 | 8 | 4 | 3 | 4 | 0 | 0 | 1 | 0 | —N/a | 33 | 5 | 9 |
| 15–16 May | go2senkyo | 26.2 | 14.3 | 4.1 | 7.3 | 3.6 | 1.2 | 0.7 | 1.4 | 0.4 | —N/a | 40.7 | —N/a | 14.5 |
| 15–16 May | FNN-Sankei | 35.3 | 7.7 | 3.1 | 1.9 | 3 | 0.8 | 0.3 | 0.3 | 0.1 | —N/a | 44.9 | 2.2 | 9.6 |
| 15–16 May | ANN | 44.9 | 12.2 | 2.6 | 3.7 | 2.8 | 1.0 | 0.6 | 0.2 | 0.5 | 1.2 | 30.3 | | 14.6 |
| 15–16 May | Asahi Shimbun | 30 | 7 | 3 | 2 | 2 | 1 | 0 | 0 | 0 | 0 | 47 | 8 | 17 |
| 15–16 May | Kyodo News | 41.9 | 8.6 | 4.5 | 3.4 | 4.6 | 1.2 | 0.4 | 1 | 0.7 | —N/a | 32.1 | —N/a | 9.8 |
| 8–9 May | JNN | 37.2 | 6.0 | 3.8 | 2.2 | 2.0 | 1.1 | 0 | 0.1 | 0.1 | 1.0 | 42.4 | 4.3 | 5.2 |
| 7–10 May | Jiji Press | 21.4 | 4.4 | 2.6 | 1.5 | 1.9 | 0.5 | 0.2 | 0.2 | 0.2 | —N/a | 64.8 | —N/a | 43.4 |
| 7–9 May | Yomiuri-NNN | 37 | 7 | 2 | 2 | 2 | 1 | 0 | 0 | | 1 | 44 | 4 | 7 |
| 7–9 May | NHK | 33.7 | 5.8 | 2.9 | 3.1 | 1.6 | 0.6 | 0.2 | 0.3 | 0.2 | 0.5 | 43.8 | 7.4 | 10.1 |
| 23–25 Apr | Nikkei | 47 | 9 | 3 | 3 | 4 | 1 | 1 | 1 | 0 | 0 | 29 | 3 | 18 |
| 18 Apr | Mainichi Shimbun | 31 | 11 | 4 | 4 | 8 | 1 | 0 | 2 | 1 | 1 | 36 | —N/a | 5 |
| 17–18 Apr | FNN-Sankei | 39.2 | 5.5 | 3.2 | 2.9 | 3.3 | 0.7 | 0.2 | 0.4 | 0.2 | 0.2 | 38.7 | 4.2 | 0.5 |
| 17–18 Apr | ANN | 45.1 | 9.0 | 3.4 | 3.4 | 3.0 | 0.5 | 1.0 | 1 | 0.1 | 1.6 | 32.4 | —N/a | 12.7 |
| 9–12 Apr | Jiji Press | 22.5 | 4.2 | 3.8 | 1.8 | 1.6 | 0.3 | 0.2 | 0.3 | 0 | —N/a | 62.2 | —N/a | 39.7 |
| 3 Mar – 12 Apr | Asahi Shimbun | 38 | 8 | 4 | 2 | 5 | 1 | 0 | 1 | 0 | —N/a | 41 | 0 | 3 |
| 10–11 Apr | Asahi Shimbun | 35 | 6 | 2 | 3 | 2 | 1 | 0 | 0 | 0 | 0 | 43 | 8 | 8 |
| 9-11 Apr | NHK | 37.4 | 6.3 | 4.1 | 2.7 | 1.5 | 0.7 | 0.3 | 0.3 | —N/a | 0.7 | 39.7 | 6.4 | 2.3 |
| 3–4 Apr | JNN | 35.6 | 4.9 | 3.1 | 2.6 | 1.4 | 0.5 | 0.3 | 0.5 | 0.1 | 0.5 | 47.0 | 3.6 | 11.4 |
| 2–4 Apr | Yomiuri-NNN | 39 | 5 | 3 | 2 | 2 | 0 | 0 | 0 | 0 | 1 | 43 | 4 | 4 |
| 26–28 Mar | Nikkei | 43 | 11 | 4 | 4 | 4 | 1 | 0 | 0 | 0 | 0 | 29 | 4 | 14 |
| 20–21 Mar | Asahi Shimbun | 33 | 5 | 3 | 2 | 2 | 1 | 1 | 0 | 0 | 0 | 46 | 7 | 13 |
| 20–21 Mar | ANN | 43.7 | 10.5 | 3.9 | 4.5 | 2.2 | 1.2 | 0.3 | 0.1 | 0.4 | 1.3 | 31.9 | | 11.8 |
| 13–14 Mar | FNN-Sankei | 40.1 | 6.5 | 4.4 | 2.1 | 2.5 | 1.1 | 0.2 | 0.2 | 0.3 | 0.9 | 39.9 | 3 | 0.2 |
| 6–7 Mar | JNN | 38.3 | 4.8 | 2.0 | 2.4 | 3.1 | 0.9 | 0.3 | 0.5 | 0.4 | 0.3 | 41.4 | 5.5 | 3.1 |
| 5–8 Mar | Jiji Press | 23 | 4.8 | 3.5 | 1.7 | 2.4 | 0.4 | 0.2 | 0.2 | 0.1 | | 62.4 | —N/a | 39.4 |
| 5–7 Mar | NHK | 35.6 | 4.5 | 3.2 | 3.1 | 2.1 | 0.8 | 0.3 | 0.2 | 0.2 | 0.2 | 40.1 | 9.5 | 4.5 |
| 5–7 Mar | Yomiuri-NNN | 40 | 6 | 3 | 2 | 3 | 0 | 1 | 1 | —N/a | 0 | 42 | 3 | 2 |
| 26–28 Feb | Nikkei | 45 | 11 | 2 | 5 | 3 | 1 | | 1 | | | 27 | 4 | 18 |
| 20–21 Feb | FNN-Sankei | 38.6 | 8 | 2.6 | 2.3 | 3.9 | 1 | 0.1 | 0.6 | 0.2 | 0.8 | 39.7 | 2.1 | 1.1 |
| 13–14 Feb | Asahi Shimbun | 33 | 7 | 4 | 3 | 2 | 1 | —N/a | 0 | 0 | 0 | 44 | 6 | 11 |
| 13–14 Feb | ANN | 45.2 | 11.8 | 3.5 | 2.5 | 2.9 | 0.6 | 0.6 | 0.2 | 0 | 1.4 | 31.3 | | 13.9 |
| 6–7 Feb | JNN | 36.7 | 6.2 | 3.7 | 2.4 | 3.1 | 0.7 | 0.3 | 0.4 | 0.3 | 0.6 | 42.3 | 3.2 | 5.6 |
| 5–7 Feb | NHK | 35.1 | 6.8 | 3 | 3 | 2.6 | 0.9 | 0.6 | 0.4 | 0.2 | —N/a | 42.3 | 5.1 | 7.2 |
| 5–7 Feb | Yomiuri-NNN | 37 | 5 | 4 | 2 | 1 | 1 | 1 | 0 | 0 | 0 | 42 | 5 | 5 |
| 4–7 Feb | Jiji Press | 25.5 | 3.8 | 2.4 | 1.6 | 2.1 | 0.6 | 0.4 | 0.3 | 0.2 | —N/a | 61.2 | —N/a | 35.7 |
| 29–31 Jan | Nikkei | 44 | 9 | 5 | 5 | 3 | 1 | | | | | 30 | 2 | 14 |
| 23–24 Jan | FNN-Sankei | 39.1 | 8.9 | 3.6 | 2.5 | 4 | 0.9 | 0.3 | 0.9 | 0.5 | 0.4 | 38.5 | 0.3 | 0.6 |
| 16–17 Jan | ANN | 45.7 | 7.9 | 4.4 | 3.1 | 2.5 | 1.7 | 0.7 | 0.3 | 0.4 | 4.1 | 29.2 | | 16.5 |
| 15–17 Jan | Yomiuri-NNN | 37 | 5 | 3 | 2 | 1 | 1 | 0 | 0 | 0 | 1 | 46 | 3 | 9 |
| 9-11 Jan | NHK | 37.8 | 6.6 | 3 | 2.9 | 1.1 | 0.5 | 0.5 | 0.5 | 0.2 | 0.5 | 40.5 | 6 | 2.7 |
| 8–11 Jan | Jiji Press | 23.7 | 3.1 | 3.9 | 1.7 | 1.6 | 0.5 | 0.8 | 0.2 | 0.1 | —N/a | 62.8 | —N/a | 39.1 |
| 9–10 Jan | JNN | 34.2 | 5.9 | 3.2 | 2.4 | 2.0 | 0.8 | 0.2 | 0.3 | 0.6 | 1.0 | 46.2 | 3.3 | 12.0 |
| 9–10 Jan | Kyodo News | 41.2 | 7.8 | 3.9 | 3.3 | 4.3 | 0.8 | 0.1 | 1.1 | 0.4 | —N/a | 34.6 | —N/a | 6.6 |
| 22 Oct 2017 | 2017 general election | 33.3 | 19.9 | 12.5 | 7.9 | 6.1 | 17.4 (Note: as Kibō no Tō) | 0.8 | —N/a (Note: as Liberal Party) | —N/a | 1.3 | —N/a | —N/a | 13.4 |

=== 2020 ===
| Fieldwork date | Polling firm | LDP | CDP | Kōmeitō | JCP | Ishin | DPFP | SDP | Reiwa | N-Koku | Others | No party | Und./ no ans. | Lead |
|---|---|---|---|---|---|---|---|---|---|---|---|---|---|---|
| 26–27 Dec | Yomiuri-NNN | 38 | 3 | 3 | 2 | 2 | 1 | 0 | 0 | 0 | 1 | 47 | 2 | 9 |
| 25–27 Dec | Nikkei | 42 | 9 | 3 | 3 | 4 | 1 | 1 | | | | 33 | 3 | 9 |
| 19–20 Dec | ANN | 47 | 9.3 | 3.9 | 3.9 | 2.6 | 1.7 | 0.5 | 0.3 | 0 | 1 | 29.8 | | 17.2 |
| 11–13 Dec | NHK | 38.2 | 5.1 | 3.4 | 2.2 | 2.4 | 0.6 | 0.4 | 0.3 | 0.2 | 0.2 | 39.4 | 7.6 | 1.2 |
| 4–7 Dec | Jiji Press | 24.7 | 4.1 | 3.3 | 1.5 | 1.8 | 0.9 | 0.4 | 0.6 | 0.2 | —N/a | 60.3 | | 35.6 |
| 5–6 Dec | JNN | 38.0 | 5.0 | 3.4 | 2.4 | 2.0 | 0.4 | 0.2 | 0.2 | 0.1 | 0.5 | 45.9 | 1.8 | 7.9 |
| 5–6 Dec | Kyodo News | 41.5 | 7.2 | 3.7 | 3.1 | 5.6 | 1.7 | 1 | 1.3 | 0.4 | —N/a | 32.5 | | 9 |
| 4–6 Dec | Yomiuri-NNN | 42 | 5 | 3 | 1 | 2 | 1 | 0 | 0 | 0 | 1 | 40 | 5 | 2 |
| 27–29 Nov | Nikkei | 49 | 6 | 3 | 3 | 4 | 1 | 1 | 1 | | | 30 | 2 | 19 |
| 15 Oct – 17 Nov | Yomiuri-Waseda | 40 | 6 | 4 | 2 | 5 | 0 | 0 | 1 | 1 | 0 | 40 | 2 | Tied |
| 14–15 Nov | Asahi Shimbun | 39 | 6 | 4 | 2 | 2 | 0 | 1 | 0 | 0 | 0 | 40 | 6 | 1 |
| 14–15 Nov | ANN | 48.2 | 9.2 | 3.3 | 3.3 | 3.7 | 0.7 | 0.8 | 0.4 | 0.3 | 1.4 | 28.7 | | 19.5 |
| 6–9 Nov | Jiji Press | 25.7 | 4.1 | 2.6 | 1.5 | 1.7 | 0.2 | 0.3 | 0.3 | 0.2 | —N/a | 61 | | 35.3 |
| 7–8 Nov | JNN | 40.4 | 4.5 | 2.9 | 1.8 | 2.7 | 1.4 | 0.2 | 0.4 | 0.3 | 0.5 | 41.3 | 3.5 | 0.9 |
| 6–8 Nov | NHK | 36.8 | 4.9 | 3.6 | 2.3 | 1.5 | 0.8 | 0.5 | 0.5 | 0.1 | 0.1 | 40 | 9 | 3.2 |
| 6–8 Nov | Yomiuri-NNN | 48 | 4 | 3 | 2 | 3 | 1 | 0 | 0 | —N/a | 1 | 36 | 2 | 12 |
| 23–25 Oct | Nikkei | 45 | 8 | 4 | 4 | 3 | 1 | 0 | 1 | | | 30 | 3 | 15 |
| 17–18 Oct | Asahi Shimbun | 39 | 6 | 3 | 3 | 2 | 0 | 0 | 0 | 0 | 0 | 41 | 6 | 2 |
| 17–18 Oct | ANN | 49.4 | 9 | 4.2 | 3.9 | 3.6 | 0.8 | 0.3 | 0.1 | 0.1 | 0.9 | 27.7 | | 21.7 |
| 16–18 Oct | Yomiuri-NNN | 42 | 4 | 3 | 3 | 2 | 1 | 0 | 1 | —N/a | 1 | 41 | 3 | 1 |
| 9–12 Oct | Jiji Press | 26.4 | 3.8 | 3 | 1.9 | 1 | 0.5 | 0.3 | 0.3 | 0.1 | —N/a | 59.2 | | 32.8 |
| 9-11 Oct | NHK | 37 | 5.8 | 3.2 | 2.6 | 1.6 | 0.5 | 0.4 | | —N/a | 0.1 | 40.3 | 8.5 | 3.3 |
| 3–4 Oct | JNN | 40.7 | 4.5 | 4.0 | 2.4 | 1.9 | 0.4 | 0.4 | 0.3 | 0.0 | 0.3 | 40.8 | 4.4 | 0.1 |
| 21–22 Sep | NHK | 40.8 | 6.2 | 3 | 1.7 | 1.1 | 0.1 | 0.4 | 0.2 | 0.1 | 0.1 | 40 | 6.4 | 0.8 |
| 19–20 Sep | Yomiuri-NNN | 47 | 4 | 3 | 2 | 2 | 1 | 0 | 0 | —N/a | 0 | 37 | 3 | 10 |
| 19–20 Sep | ANN | 53.9 | 9.1 | 3.5 | 3.0 | 2.5 | 0.7 | 0.3 | 0.1 | 0.1 | —N/a | 25.5 | | 28.4 |
| 16–17 Sep | Nikkei | 52 | 7 | 4 | 3 | 3 | 1 | 1 | 1 | | | 24 | 4 | 28 |
| 16–17 Sep | Asahi Shimbun | 41 | 6 | 3 | 2 | 2 | 1 | 0 | 0 | 0 | 0 | 38 | | 3 |
| 16 Sep | Yoshihide Suga assumes office as the Prime Minister and President of the LDP. | | | | | | | | | | | | | |
| 15 Sep | The Constitutional Democratic Party merges with the majority of the Democratic Party For the People as well as some independents. | | | | | | | | | | | | | |
| 5–6 Sep | JNN | 43.2 | 3.5 | 1.1 | 3.2 | 2.2 | 2.3 | 0.3 | 0.3 | 0.1 | 0.6 | 39.5 | 3.7 | 3.7 |
| 2–3 Sep | Mainichi and JNN | 40 | 3 | 3 | 3 | 3 | 1 | 0 | 0 | 0 | 1 | 41 | 8 | 1 |
| 28 Aug | Shinzo Abe announces his intention to resign as Prime Minister and President of the LDP. | | | | | | | | | | | | | |
| 22–23 Aug | ANN | 42.8 | 7.7 | 3.9 | 3.4 | 4.8 | 1.7 | 0.5 | 0.7 | 0.0 | 2.1 | 32.4 | | 10.4 |
| 1–2 Aug | JNN | 32.0 | 4.5 | 1.0 | 3.1 | 3.5 | 2.4 | 0.4 | 0.6 | 0.2 | 0.2 | 47.5 | 4.7 | 15.5 |
| 18–19 Jul | ANN | 40.3 | 8.7 | 4.9 | 3.6 | 3.6 | 1.7 | 0.3 | 1.2 | 0.1 | 1.7 | 33.9 | | 6.4 |
| 18–19 Jul | Asahi Shimbun | 30 | 5 | 3 | 2 | 2 | 1 | 1 | 1 | 0 | 0 | 47 | 8 | 17 |
| 17–19 Jul | Nikkei & TV Tokyo | 35 | 4 | 3 | 2 | 2 | 0 | 0 | 0 | 0 | 0 | 50 | 3 | 15 |
| 17–19 Jul | Kyodo News | 31.9 | 6.3 | 5.2 | 3.5 | 6.3 | 1.5 | 0.5 | 0.9 | 0.5 | 0.3 | 41.5 | 1.6 | 9.6 |
| 18–19 Jul | Mainichi & SSRC | 29 | 9 | 3 | 5 | 10 | 2 | 1 | 3 | 0 | 1 | 36 | —N/a | 7 |
| 10–13 Jul | Jiji Press | 26.0 | 3.3 | 2.8 | 1.3 | 2.2 | 0.6 | 0.2 | 0.7 | 0.2 | —N/a | 60.5 | —N/a | 34.5 |
| 11–12 Jul | go2senkyo & JX | 29.3 | 8.4 | 5.8 | 4.5 | 5.5 | 1.0 | 1.3 | 1.4 | 0.2 | —N/a | 42.6 | —N/a | 13.3 |
| 4–5 Jul | JNN | 35.8 | 5.1 | 3.5 | 2.4 | 3.5 | 0.6 | 0.5 | 0.7 | 0.4 | 1.0 | 42.9 | 3.6 | 7.1 |
| 3–5 Jul | Yomiuri Shimbun | 32 | 5 | 4 | 2 | 4 | 1 | 0 | 1 | 0 | 1 | 46 | 4 | 14 |
| 11–22 Jun | Jiji Press (Note: Mail Survey) | 33.9 | 7.2 | 4.3 | 2.2 | 5.9 | 1.2 | 1.1 | 1.5 | 0.4 | —N/a | 40.8 | —N/a | 6.9 |
| 20–21 Jun | ANN | 43.0 | 9.1 | 3.8 | 4.0 | 6.8 | 0.8 | 0.5 | 1.0 | 0.0 | 3.4 | 27.6 | | 15.4 |
| 20–21 Jun | Kyodo News | 37.3 | 7.6 | 3.4 | 3.1 | 7.4 | 1.5 | 1.2 | 1.4 | 0.5 | 0.3 | 34.2 | 2.1 | 3.1 |
| 20–21 Jun | Asahi Shimbun | 29 | 5 | 3 | 3 | 4 | 1 | 0 | 1 | 0 | 0 | 46 | 8 | 17 |
| 20–20 Jun | Mainichi & SSRC | 31 | 10 | 4 | 6 | 11 | 2 | 1 | 3 | 1 | 1 | 30 | —N/a | 1 |
| 13–14 Jun | go2senkyo & JX | 29.2 | 13.0 | 4.2 | 4.4 | 5.4 | 1.5 | 1.0 | 1.2 | 0.2 | —N/a | 39.8 | —N/a | 10.6 |
| 6–7 Jun | JNN | 34.4 | 6.1 | 3.5 | 2.3 | 3.9 | 1.3 | 0.6 | 1.1 | 0.1 | 0.1 | 43.0 | 3.7 | 8.6 |
| 5–7 Jun | Nikkei & TV Tokyo | 30 | 5 | 3 | 2 | 3 | 0 | 0 | 1 | 0 | 0 | 54 | 1 | 24 |
| 5–7 Jun | Yomiuri Shimbun | 34 | 4 | 3 | 3 | 3 | 1 | 0 | 1 | 0 | 1 | 45 | 5 | 11 |
| 21 May – 1 Jun | Jiji Press | 30.9 | 6.6 | 4.0 | 3.4 | 7.7 | 1.2 | 0.9 | 1.5 | 0.6 | —N/a | 42.0 | —N/a | 11.1 |
| 29–31 May | Kyodo News | 37.4 | 7.2 | 3.0 | 3.0 | 7.3 | 0.9 | 0.4 | 1.7 | 0.3 | 0.3 | 36.4 | 2.1 | 1.0 |
| 23–24 May | Asahi Shimbun | 26 | 5 | 4 | 3 | 4 | 1 | 1 | 0 | 0 | 1 | 48 | 7 | 22 |
| 23–24 May | Mainichi & SSRC | 25 | 12 | 4 | 7 | 11 | 1 | 1 | 1 | 1 | 1 | 36 | —N/a | 11 |
| 16–17 May | go2senkyo & JX | 28.8 | 12.7 | 4.3 | 5.4 | 6.8 | 0.7 | 0.9 | 1.2 | 0.3 | —N/a | 39.1 | —N/a | 10.3 |
| 16–17 May | ANN | 35.5 | 8.7 | 4.2 | 3.9 | 3.8 | 1.9 | 0.8 | 0.4 | 0.4 | 1.5 | 38.9 | | 3.4 |
| 9–10 May | JNN | 35.9 | 6.1 | 4.4 | 2.3 | 3.7 | 0.5 | 0.3 | 0.3 | 0.2 | 0.1 | 40.7 | 5.5 | 4.8 |
| 8–10 May | Nikkei & TV Tokyo | 34 | 3 | 3 | 1 | 4 | 0 | 1 | 1 | 0 | 0 | 50 | 2 | 16 |
| 8–10 May | Kyodo News | 35.1 | 6.9 | 5.3 | 3.2 | 8.7 | 1.2 | 0.7 | 1.5 | 0.2 | 0.4 | 35.5 | 1.3 | 0.4 |
| 8–10 May | Yomiuri Shimbun | 34 | 4 | 4 | 3 | 4 | 1 | 0 | 0 | 0 | 1 | 44 | 3 | 10 |
| 18–19 Apr | Asahi Shimbun | 33 | 5 | 5 | 2 | 3 | 1 | 1 | 1 | 0 | 0 | 43 | 6 | 10 |
| 18–19 Apr | Mainichi Shimbun | 29 | 5 | 5 | 2 | 6 | 1 | 1 | 1 | 1 | 1 | 43 | —N/a | 14 |
| 10–13 Apr | Kyodo News | 33.1 | 7.7 | 3.4 | 3.7 | 5.3 | 1.1 | 0.9 | 2.2 | 0.4 | 0.2 | 39.3 | 2.7 | 6.2 |
| 4 Mar – 13 Apr | Asahi Shimbun | 37 | 9 | 4 | 3 | 3 | 1 | 1 | 1 | 1 | 0 | 38 | 2 | 1 |
| 11–12 Apr | go2senkyo & JX | 29.2 | 9.5 | 2.4 | 6.4 | 6.0 | 1.3 | 1.0 | 1.1 | 0.4 | —N/a | 42.6 | —N/a | 13.4 |
| 11–12 Apr | Yomiuri Shimbun | 34 | 5 | 4 | 3 | 2 | 1 | 0 | 0 | 0 | 0 | 44 | 5 | 10 |
| 10–12 Apr | NHK | 33.3 | 4.0 | 3.3 | 2.9 | 1.6 | 0.5 | 0.6 | 0.5 | 0.2 | 0.7 | 45.3 | 7.3 | 12.0 |
| 8–9 Apr | Mainichi, JNN, & SSRC | 34 | 9 | 3 | 4 | 5 | 1 | 1 | 3 | 1 | 1 | 36 | —N/a | 2 |
| 4–5 Apr | JNN | 34.3 | 5.0 | 4.2 | 3.3 | 3.3 | 1.4 | 0.5 | 0.8 | 0.4 | 0.6 | 41.8 | 4.4 | 7.5 |
| 27–29 Mar | Nikkei & TV Tokyo | 37 | 8 | 4 | 3 | 3 | 1 | 1 | 1 | 0 | 0 | 38 | 3 | 1 |
| 26–28 Mar | Kyodo News | 37.0 | 7.4 | 3.6 | 3.3 | 5.0 | 1.0 | 0.7 | 1.8 | 0.9 | 0.0 | 36.8 | 2.4 | 0.2 |
| 21–22 Mar | ANN | 43.5 | 8.1 | 4.7 | 3.5 | 2.6 | 1.1 | 0.9 | 1.2 | 0.1 | 3.0 | 31.3 | | 12.2 |
| 20–22 Mar | Yomiuri Shimbun | 35 | 5 | 4 | 4 | 1 | 1 | 1 | 1 | 0 | 0 | 44 | 4 | 9 |
| 14–16 Mar | Kyodo News | 40.0 | 9.6 | 3.3 | 3.3 | 4.2 | 1.5 | 1.2 | 2.4 | 1.7 | 0.0 | 31.6 | 1.2 | 8.4 |
| 14–15 Mar | Asahi Shimbun | 36 | 6 | 3 | 3 | 1 | 1 | 0 | 1 | 0 | 0 | 40 | 9 | 4 |
| 14–15 Mar | Mainichi Shimbun | 33 | 9 | 4 | 4 | 4 | 1 | 0 | 1 | 1 | 1 | 40 | —N/a | 7 |
| 6–9 Mar | Jiji Press | 24.0 | 3.5 | 3.5 | 1.6 | 1.3 | 0.4 | 0.5 | 0.7 | 0.1 | —N/a | 62.4 | —N/a | 38.4 |
| 7–8 Mar | JNN | 36.4 | 6.4 | 3.5 | 3.3 | 1.5 | 0.9 | 0.4 | 0.6 | 0.3 | 0.3 | 41.6 | 4.9 | 5.2 |
| 6–8 Mar | NHK | 36.5 | 6.3 | 3.0 | 3.1 | 1.3 | 0.9 | 0.8 | 0.4 | 0.0 | 0.2 | 41.5 | 6.0 | 5.0 |
| 29 Feb – 1 Mar | go2senkyo & JX | 32.0 | 12.3 | 3.5 | 5.4 | 2.8 | 1.2 | 0.9 | 1.3 | 0.5 | —N/a | 40.1 | —N/a | 8.1 |
| 29 Feb – 1 Mar | go2senkyo & JX | 31.6 | 12.1 | 3.5 | 5.3 | 2.8 | 1.2 | 0.9 | 1.2 | 0.4 | 1.5 | 39.5 | —N/a | 7.9 |
| 21–23 Feb | Nikkei & TV Tokyo | 39 | 9 | 4 | 4 | 3 | 2 | 0 | 1 | 0 | 0 | 34 | 3 | 5 |
| 15–16 Feb | go2senkyo & JX | 32.1 | 12.8 | 4.2 | 5.4 | 3.4 | 0.9 | 1.0 | 1.6 | 0.5 | —N/a | 38.2 | —N/a | 6.1 |
| 15–16 Feb | Asahi Shimbun | 34 | 6 | 3 | 3 | 2 | 2 | 0 | 1 | 0 | 0 | 39 | 10 | 5 |
| 15–16 Feb | ANN | 45.4 | 10.2 | 3.8 | 3.4 | 2.7 | 1.6 | 0.4 | 1.1 | 0.7 | 1.1 | 29.6 | | 15.8 |
| 15–16 Feb | Kyodo News | 40.5 | 10.9 | 3.1 | 3.5 | 3.5 | 1.9 | 1.0 | 2.3 | 0.5 | 0.1 | 31.0 | 1.7 | 9.5 |
| 14–15 Feb | Yomiuri Shimbun | 40 | 5 | 3 | 3 | 3 | 1 | 0 | 1 | 0 | 0 | 39 | 5 | 1 |
| 7–9 Feb | NHK | 37.4 | 6.0 | 4.0 | 2.6 | 1.4 | 1.0 | 1.2 | 0.6 | 0.2 | 0.2 | 38.0 | 7.4 | 0.6 |
| 6–9 Feb | Jiji Press | 24.3 | 5.6 | 2.8 | 1.6 | 1.3 | 0.5 | 0.2 | 0.9 | 0.2 | —N/a | 60.6 | —N/a | 36.3 |
| 1–2 Feb | JNN | 38.2 | 4.8 | 2.6 | 3.1 | 1.5 | 0.9 | 0.4 | 1.3 | 0.5 | 0.2 | 41.7 | 4.9 | 3.5 |
| 25–26 Jan | Asahi Shimbun | 34 | 7 | 4 | 3 | 1 | 1 | 0 | 1 | 0 | 0 | 37 | 12 | 3 |
| 24–26 Jan | Nikkei & TV Tokyo | 45 | 10 | 3 | 4 | 2 | 1 | 1 | 1 | 0 | 0 | 30 | 3 | 15 |
| 18–19 Jan | ANN | 45.0 | 8.2 | 4.4 | 4.1 | 2.7 | 2.0 | 0.8 | 1.2 | 0.2 | 1.6 | 29.8 | | 15.2 |
| 18–19 Jan | Mainichi Shimbun | 34 | 8 | 2 | 2 | 3 | 2 | 1 | 1 | 1 | 1 | 40 | —N/a | 6 |
| 17–19 Jan | Yomiuri Shimbun | 41 | 7 | 3 | 3 | 2 | 1 | 0 | 0 | 0 | 0 | 39 | 3 | 2 |
| 11–13 Jan | NHK | 40.0 | 5.4 | 3.4 | 2.9 | 1.6 | 0.9 | 0.7 | 0.2 | 0.2 | 0.2 | 38.5 | 5.9 | 1.5 |
| 10–13 Jan | Jiji Press | 24.9 | 3.3 | 3.4 | 2.6 | 1.0 | 0.9 | 0.7 | 0.5 | 0.2 | —N/a | 60.4 | —N/a | 35.5 |
| 11–12 Jan | go2senkyo & JX | 29.7 | 11.2 | 3.5 | 6.2 | 4.0 | 1.1 | 0.5 | 1.3 | 1.1 | —N/a | 41.4 | —N/a | 11.7 |
| 11–12 Jan | JNN | 38.6 | 5.8 | 3.8 | 2.8 | 2.9 | 1.4 | 0.4 | 0.6 | 0.0 | 0.3 | 38.9 | 4.6 | 0.3 |
| 11–12 Jan | Kyodo News | 43.2 | 6.9 | 2.9 | 4.1 | 4.4 | 1.6 | 1.1 | 2.4 | 0.7 | 0.0 | 31.5 | 1.2 | 11.7 |
| 22 Oct 2017 | 2017 general election | 33.3 | 19.9 | 12.5 | 7.9 | 6.1 | 17.4 | 0.8 | —N/a | —N/a | 1.3 | —N/a | —N/a | 13.4 |

=== 2019 ===
| Fieldwork date | Polling firm | LDP | CDP | DPFP | Kibō | Kōmeitō | JCP | Ishin | SDP | LP | Reiwa | N-Koku | Others | No party | Und./ no ans. | Lead |
|---|---|---|---|---|---|---|---|---|---|---|---|---|---|---|---|---|
| 21–22 Dec | Asahi Shimbun | 34 | 6 | 1 | 0 | 4 | 3 | 2 | 1 | Did not exist | 1 | 1 | 1 | 41 | 5 | 7 |
| 20–22 Dec | Nikkei & TV Tokyo | 41 | 8 | 1 | —N/a | 4 | 5 | 2 | 1 | Did not exist | 1 | 0 | 0 | 35 | 3 | 6 |
| 14–15 Dec | go2senkyo & JX | 31.6 | 12.5 | 0.9 | —N/a | 3.8 | 5.6 | 3.8 | 0.9 | Did not exist | 2.1 | 0.6 | —N/a | 38.2 | —N/a | 6.6 |
| 14–15 Dec | ANN | 45.6 | 9.8 | 1.3 | —N/a | 2.8 | 5.1 | 1.6 | 0.5 | Did not exist | 2.0 | 0.2 | 0.8 | 30.3 | | 15.3 |
| 14–15 Dec | Kyodo News | 36.0 | 10.8 | 1.5 | —N/a | 4.7 | 3.0 | 3.3 | 0.8 | Did not exist | 4.5 | 1.5 | 0.3 | 31.8 | 1.8 | 4.2 |
| 13–15 Dec | Yomiuri Shimbun | 37 | 6 | 0 | —N/a | 3 | 3 | 1 | 0 | Did not exist | 1 | 0 | 0 | 44 | 3 | 7 |
| 6–9 Dec | Jiji Press | 23.0 | 3.8 | 0.6 | —N/a | 3.5 | 2.0 | 2.0 | 0.2 | Did not exist | 0.7 | 0.3 | —N/a | 61.1 | —N/a | 38.1 |
| 9 Oct – 9 Dec | Mainichi & SSRC | 38 | 9 | 1 | —N/a | 4 | 3 | 4 | 0 | Did not exist | 2 | 1 | 1 | 36 | —N/a | 2 |
| 7–8 Dec | JNN | 35.1 | 7.3 | 1.0 | —N/a | 3.1 | 3.5 | 1.9 | 0.8 | Did not exist | 1.0 | 0.4 | 0.4 | 40.8 | 5.0 | 5.7 |
| 6–8 Dec | NHK | 36.1 | 5.5 | 0.9 | —N/a | 2.7 | 3.0 | 1.6 | 0.7 | Did not exist | 0.6 | 0.1 | 0.1 | 41.4 | 7.4 | 5.3 |
| 30 Nov – 1 Dec | Mainichi Shimbun | 36 | 8 | 1 | —N/a | 3 | 4 | 4 | 0 | Did not exist | 2 | 0 | 0 | 35 | —N/a | 1 |
| 23–24 Nov | Kyodo News | 41.8 | 8.7 | 0.9 | —N/a | 4.2 | 3.7 | 3.9 | 0.4 | Did not exist | 2.5 | 1.2 | 0.3 | 30.4 | 2.0 | 11.4 |
| 22–24 Nov | Nikkei & TV Tokyo | 39 | 8 | 1 | —N/a | 4 | 4 | 3 | 1 | Did not exist | 1 | 1 | 0 | 36 | 3 | 3 |
| 16–17 Nov | Asahi Shimbun | 36 | 7 | 1 | 0 | 3 | 4 | 2 | 1 | Did not exist | 1 | 0 | 1 | 37 | 7 | 1 |
| 15–17 Nov | Yomiuri Shimbun | 37 | 7 | 1 | —N/a | 4 | 4 | 1 | 0 | Did not exist | 2 | 1 | 0 | 38 | 4 | 1 |
| 9–10 Nov | go2senkyo & JX | 35.5 | 12.5 | 1.3 | —N/a | 4.3 | 4.4 | 3.2 | 0.9 | Did not exist | 1.0 | 0.8 | —N/a | 36.3 | —N/a | 0.8 |
| 9–10 Nov | ANN | 45.7 | 9.8 | 3.0 | —N/a | 5.3 | 4.2 | 2.1 | 0.6 | Did not exist | 1.1 | 0.5 | 1.2 | 26.5 | | 19.2 |
| 9–10 Nov | JNN | 38.2 | 6.3 | 1.0 | —N/a | 4.7 | 2.5 | 2.8 | 0.5 | Did not exist | 0.9 | 0.4 | 0.3 | 37.2 | 5.2 | 1.0 |
| 8–10 Nov | Jiji Press | 30.1 | 3.1 | 0.2 | —N/a | 3.7 | 2.0 | 1.3 | 0.6 | Did not exist | 0.6 | 0.2 | —N/a | 55.5 | —N/a | 25.4 |
| 8–10 Nov | NHK | 36.8 | 6.3 | 1.4 | —N/a | 3.8 | 3.5 | 2.2 | 0.3 | Did not exist | 1.2 | 0.2 | 0.1 | 37.7 | 6.5 | 0.9 |
| 26–27 Oct | Mainichi Shimbun | 36 | 10 | 1 | —N/a | 3 | 3 | 4 | 1 | Did not exist | 1 | 1 | 0 | 34 | —N/a | 2 |
| 26–27 Oct | Kyodo News | 44.6 | 8.5 | 1.3 | —N/a | 4.2 | 3.6 | 3.6 | 1.1 | Did not exist | 2.1 | 0.8 | 0.1 | 28.9 | 1.2 | 15.7 |
| 25–27 Oct | Nikkei & TV Tokyo | 46 | 7 | 0 | —N/a | 5 | 4 | 4 | 0 | Did not exist | 1 | 1 | 0 | 29 | 2 | 17 |
| 19–20 Oct | Asahi Shimbun | 35 | 6 | 1 | 0 | 5 | 2 | 2 | 0 | Did not exist | 1 | 1 | 1 | 39 | 7 | 4 |
| 19–20 Oct | ANN | 45.6 | 7.8 | 1.8 | —N/a | 4.3 | 4.3 | 2.9 | 1.3 | Did not exist | 0.6 | 0.3 | 1.1 | 30.0 | | 15.6 |
| 18–20 Oct | Yomiuri Shimbun | 42 | 5 | 1 | —N/a | 3 | 3 | 2 | 0 | Did not exist | 1 | 0 | 0 | 38 | 5 | 4 |
| 11–14 Oct | Jiji Press | 27.5 | 5.8 | 0.6 | —N/a | 3.9 | 1.8 | 1.2 | 0.1 | Did not exist | 0.6 | 0.2 | —N/a | 56.0 | —N/a | 28.5 |
| 5–6 Oct | JNN | 40.1 | 8.1 | 1.8 | —N/a | 3.5 | 2.9 | 3.1 | 0.4 | Did not exist | 1.0 | 0.2 | 0.6 | 34.2 | 4.2 | 5.9 |
| 5–6 Oct | Kyodo News | 42.1 | 8.0 | 1.6 | —N/a | 3.8 | 3.0 | 4.7 | 0.7 | Did not exist | 2.1 | 1.2 | 0.0 | 31.9 | 0.9 | 10.2 |
| 14–15 Sep | Asahi Shimbun | 37 | 7 | 1 | 0 | 3 | 3 | 3 | 1 | Did not exist | 1 | 0 | 1 | 35 | 8 | 2 |
| 14–15 Sep | ANN | 46.9 | 7.0 | 1.7 | —N/a | 5.4 | 5.2 | 4.3 | 0.5 | Did not exist | 1.1 | 0.7 | 1.1 | 26.1 | | 20.8 |
| 14–15 Sep | Mainichi Shimbun | 34 | 8 | 1 | —N/a | 5 | 2 | 5 | 0 | Did not exist | 2 | 1 | 1 | 36 | —N/a | 2 |
| 13–15 Sep | Yomiuri Shimbun | 38 | 5 | 1 | —N/a | 5 | 4 | 2 | 0 | Did not exist | 1 | 1 | 0 | 39 | 4 | 1 |
| 11–12 Sep | Nikkei & TV Tokyo | 47 | 7 | 1 | —N/a | 4 | 3 | 2 | 1 | Did not exist | 2 | 1 | 0 | 29 | 3 | 18 |
| 11–12 Sep | Kyodo News | 47.7 | 10.0 | 1.5 | —N/a | 3.3 | 3.1 | 2.8 | 0.9 | Did not exist | 3.4 | 1.1 | 0.1 | 23.9 | 2.2 | 23.8 |
| 6–9 Sep | Jiji Press | 25.9 | 4.1 | 0.6 | —N/a | 3.5 | 2.0 | 1.8 | 0.5 | Did not exist | 0.8 | 0.5 | —N/a | 58.5 | —N/a | 32.6 |
| 7–8 Sep | JNN | 37.9 | 6.5 | 1.2 | —N/a | 2.9 | 3.7 | 4.5 | 0.4 | Did not exist | 0.6 | 0.3 | 0.4 | 38.0 | 3.7 | 0.1 |
| 6–8 Sep | NHK | 37.3 | 7.2 | 0.7 | —N/a | 2.6 | 3.4 | 3.2 | 0.2 | Did not exist | 0.6 | 0.2 | 0.7 | 37.1 | 6.9 | 0.2 |
| 30 Aug – 1 Sep | Nikkei & TV Tokyo | 40 | 8 | 1 | —N/a | 5 | 3 | 4 | 0 | Did not exist | 2 | 1 | 0 | 32 | 2 | 8 |
| 23–25 Aug | Yomiuri Shimbun | 41 | 7 | 1 | —N/a | 4 | 2 | 3 | 0 | Did not exist | 0 | 1 | 0 | 37 | 5 | 4 |
| 17–18 Aug | ANN | 44.3 | 10.0 | 2.1 | —N/a | 3.9 | 4.5 | 5.4 | 1.0 | Did not exist | 0.8 | 0.9 | 1.1 | 26.0 | | 18.3 |
| 17–18 Aug | Kyodo News | 40.9 | 10.0 | 1.4 | —N/a | 5.1 | 4.3 | 3.8 | 0.7 | Did not exist | 4.3 | 1.3 | 0.2 | 26.6 | 1.4 | 14.3 |
| 9–12 Aug | Jiji Press | 28.0 | 5.8 | 0.6 | —N/a | 4.1 | 2.1 | 2.2 | 0.4 | Did not exist | 1.0 | 0.4 | —N/a | 53.4 | —N/a | 25.4 |
| 3–4 Aug | JNN | 37.4 | 7.8 | 0.9 | —N/a | 5.3 | 2.9 | 3.6 | 0.3 | Did not exist | 1.3 | 0.8 | 0.3 | 37.0 | 2.5 | 0.4 |
| 2–4 Aug | NHK | 36.1 | 7.2 | 1.5 | —N/a | 4.0 | 3.0 | 3.8 | 0.8 | Did not exist | 1.2 | 0.2 | 0.2 | 34.8 | 7.1 | 1.3 |
| 26–28 Jul | Nikkei & TV Tokyo | 37 | 11 | 1 | —N/a | 4 | 5 | 5 | 1 | Did not exist | 2 | 1 | 1 | 30 | 2 | 7 |
| 22–23 Jul | Asahi Shimbun | 34 | 10 | 1 | 0 | 5 | 4 | 4 | 1 | Did not exist | 1 | 0 | 1 | 30 | 9 | 4 |
| 22–23 Jul | Kyodo News | 37.0 | 13.5 | 1.7 | —N/a | 4.6 | 5.3 | 6.8 | 0.7 | Did not exist | 2.2 | 1.0 | 0.3 | 25.9 | 1.0 | 11.1 |
| 22–23 Jul | Yomiuri Shimbun | 40 | 12 | 2 | —N/a | 5 | 3 | 5 | 1 | Did not exist | 1 | 1 | 0 | 27 | 4 | 13 |
| 21 Jul | House of Councillors election: Reiwa Shinsengumi and the NHK Party get status as parties. | | | | | | | | | | | | | | | |
| 13–15 Jul | NHK | 34.2 | 6.0 | 1.5 | —N/a | 4.3 | 3.2 | 3.1 | 0.5 | Did not exist | —N/a | Did not exist | 0.5 | 39.1 | 7.7 | 4.9 |
| 13–14 Jul | Asahi Shimbun | 34 | 6 | 1 | 0 | 4 | 5 | 2 | 1 | Did not exist | 1 | Did not exist | 1 | 33 | 12 | 1 |
| 5–8 Jul | Jiji Press | 25.8 | 3.9 | 0.6 | —N/a | 4.1 | 2.6 | 1.8 | 0.3 | Did not exist | —N/a | Did not exist | —N/a | 58.3 | —N/a | 32.5 |
| 6–7 Jul | JNN | 40.0 | 6.8 | 1.5 | —N/a | 4.5 | 2.7 | 3.4 | 0.5 | Did not exist | —N/a | Did not exist | 0.7 | 33.5 | 6.5 | 6.5 |
| 5–7 Jul | NHK | 33.4 | 6.0 | 1.6 | —N/a | 4.8 | 2.9 | 2.3 | 0.5 | Did not exist | —N/a | Did not exist | 1.0 | 39.5 | 8.0 | 6.1 |
| 4–5 Jul | Yomiuri Shimbun | 38 | 6 | 1 | —N/a | 4 | 3 | 3 | 1 | Did not exist | —N/a | Did not exist | 0 | 37 | 7 | 1 |
| 28–30 Jun | NHK | 34.9 | 5.8 | 1.1 | —N/a | 3.8 | 3.4 | 3.0 | 0.6 | Did not exist | —N/a | Did not exist | 0.2 | 38.3 | 8.9 | 3.4 |
| 28–30 Jun | Nikkei & TV Tokyo | 42 | 10 | 1 | 0 | 4 | 4 | 4 | 1 | Did not exist | —N/a | Did not exist | 0 | 33 | 2 | 9 |
| 28–30 Jun | Yomiuri Shimbun | 39 | 5 | 2 | —N/a | 3 | 2 | 2 | 1 | Did not exist | —N/a | Did not exist | 1 | 42 | 3 | 3 |
| 26–27 Jun | Kyodo News | 37.9 | 9.9 | 2.7 | —N/a | 5.1 | 2.9 | 3.7 | 1.5 | Did not exist | —N/a | Did not exist | 0.1 | 32.7 | 3.7 | 5.2 |
| 22–23 Jun | Asahi Shimbun | 37 | 5 | 1 | 0 | 3 | 3 | 2 | 0 | Did not exist | 0 | Did not exist | 1 | 38 | 10 | 1 |
| 21–23 Jun | NHK | 31.6 | 5.7 | 1.1 | —N/a | 4.8 | 3.7 | 2.2 | 0.5 | Did not exist | —N/a | Did not exist | 0.6 | 42.7 | 7.0 | 11.1 |
| 15–16 Jun | Kyodo News | 39.2 | 10.1 | 1.2 | —N/a | 4.3 | 3.2 | 3.9 | 1.6 | Did not exist | —N/a | Did not exist | 0.4 | 33.9 | 2.2 | 5.3 |
| 15–16 Jun | Mainichi Shimbun | 29 | 8 | 1 | —N/a | 3 | 3 | 3 | 1 | Did not exist | —N/a | Did not exist | 1 | 44 | —N/a | 15 |
| 7–10 Jun | Jiji Press | 27.7 | 3.3 | 0.6 | —N/a | 2.6 | 1.8 | 1.2 | 0.3 | Did not exist | —N/a | Did not exist | —N/a | 59.4 | —N/a | 31.7 |
| 7–9 Jun | NHK | 36.7 | 5.1 | 1.2 | —N/a | 3.1 | 2.5 | 2.6 | 0.2 | Did not exist | —N/a | Did not exist | 0.3 | 41.2 | 7.2 | 4.5 |
| 5 Jun | Kibō no Tō loses its legal status as a political party and becomes a political organization. | | | | | | | | | | | | | | | |
| 1–2 Jun | JNN | 40.0 | 4.5 | 0.9 | 0.1 | 3.5 | 2.6 | 1.9 | 0.2 | Did not exist | —N/a | Did not exist | 0.6 | 40.8 | 5.0 | 0.8 |
| 28 May | Shigefumi Matsuzawa resigns as leader of Kibō no Tō; Nariaki Nakayama is elected as leader. | | | | | | | | | | | | | | | |
| 18–19 May | ANN | 45.0 | 9.9 | 1.7 | 0.0 | 5.5 | 3.4 | 3.9 | 1.1 | Did not exist | —N/a | Did not exist | 1.3 | 28.2 | | 16.8 |
| 18–19 May | Asahi Shimbun | 34 | 5 | 1 | 0 | 4 | 2 | 3 | 0 | Did not exist | —N/a | Did not exist | 2 | 37 | 12 | 3 |
| 18–19 May | Kyodo News | 40.4 | 9.8 | 1.0 | 0.2 | 3.9 | 4.1 | 4.1 | 0.8 | Did not exist | —N/a | Did not exist | 0.1 | 33.8 | 1.8 | 6.6 |
| 18–19 May | Mainichi Shimbun | 31 | 8 | 1 | 0 | 5 | 3 | 4 | 0 | Did not exist | —N/a | Did not exist | 1 | 39 | —N/a | 8 |
| 17–19 May | Yomiuri Shimbun | 42 | 4 | 0 | 0 | 4 | 2 | 3 | 0 | Did not exist | —N/a | Did not exist | 1 | 41 | 3 | 1 |
| 10–13 May | Jiji Press | 26.5 | 3.7 | 0.6 | 0.1 | 3.8 | 2.1 | 1.6 | 0.1 | Did not exist | —N/a | Did not exist | —N/a | 59.6 | —N/a | 33.1 |
| 11–12 May | JNN | 40.1 | 6.3 | 0.8 | 0.3 | 3.2 | 2.5 | 2.7 | 0.8 | Did not exist | —N/a | Did not exist | 0.6 | 39.8 | 3.0 | 0.3 |
| 10–12 May | Nikkei & TV Tokyo | 42 | 6 | 1 | 0 | 5 | 3 | 7 | 1 | Did not exist | —N/a | Did not exist | 0 | 36 | 3 | 6 |
| 10–12 May | NHK | 35.2 | 4.8 | 0.7 | 0.0 | 3.1 | 3.2 | 2.9 | 0.6 | Did not exist | —N/a | Did not exist | 0.6 | 40.2 | 8.8 | 5.0 |
| 1–2 May | Kyodo News | 40.9 | 7.8 | 0.9 | 0.1 | 4.2 | 2.3 | 4.3 | 0.3 | Did not exist | —N/a | Did not exist | 0.2 | 37.6 | 1.4 | 3.3 |
| 26–28 Apr | Yomiuri Shimbun | 40 | 4 | 1 | 0 | 3 | 3 | 4 | 0 | Did not exist | —N/a | Did not exist | 0 | 40 | 5 | Tied |
| 26 Apr | The Liberal Party is merged into the Democratic Party For the People. | | | | | | | | | | | | | | | |
| 20–21 Apr | ANN | 43.0 | 10.1 | 1.4 | 0.1 | 3.8 | 5.0 | 4.0 | 0.4 | 0.2 | —N/a | Did not exist | 1.2 | 30.8 | | 12.2 |
| 6 Mar – 15 Apr | Asahi Shimbun | 35 | 7 | 1 | 0 | 4 | 3 | 1 | 1 | 1 | —N/a | Did not exist | 0 | 47 | 0 | 12 |
| 13–14 Apr | Asahi Shimbun | 35 | 7 | 1 | 0 | 3 | 3 | 2 | 1 | 0 | —N/a | Did not exist | 1 | 38 | 9 | 3 |
| 13–14 Apr | Mainichi Shimbun | 30 | 8 | 1 | 0 | 4 | 4 | 3 | 1 | 0 | —N/a | Did not exist | 2 | 42 | —N/a | 12 |
| 5–8 Apr | Jiji Press | 26.7 | 4.3 | 0.6 | 0.1 | 3.9 | 1.9 | 1.3 | 0.1 | 0.2 | —N/a | Did not exist | —N/a | 58.5 | —N/a | 31.8 |
| 6–7 Apr | JNN | 40.2 | 4.7 | 1.4 | 0.0 | 3.8 | 2.8 | 2.1 | 0.8 | 0.2 | —N/a | Did not exist | 0.4 | 39.6 | 4.2 | 0.6 |
| 5–7 Apr | NHK | 37.3 | 5.4 | 0.9 | 0.0 | 4.4 | 2.4 | 1.0 | 0.2 | 0.2 | —N/a | Did not exist | 0.2 | 40.7 | 7.3 | 3.4 |
| 1–2 Apr | Kyodo News | 43.0 | 7.9 | 1.6 | 0.2 | 3.5 | 2.7 | 3.5 | 1.4 | 0.3 | —N/a | Did not exist | 0.0 | 33.9 | 2.0 | 9.1 |
| 1–2 Apr | Yomiuri Shimbun | 38 | 3 | 1 | 0 | 4 | 3 | 2 | 0 | 0 | —N/a | Did not exist | 0 | 42 | 5 | 4 |
| 1 Apr | Reiwa Shinsengumi is founded as a political organization. | | | | | | | | | | | | | | | |
| 22–24 Mar | Nikkei & TV Tokyo | 43 | 7 | 0 | 0 | 3 | 5 | 3 | 0 | 0 | Did not exist | Did not exist | 0 | 34 | 5 | 9 |
| 22–24 Mar | Yomiuri Shimbun | 38 | 4 | 0 | 0 | 4 | 2 | 1 | 1 | 0 | Did not exist | Did not exist | 0 | 44 | 6 | 6 |
| 16–17 Mar | ANN | 45.7 | 10.3 | 1.5 | 0.0 | 4.7 | 4.4 | 1.1 | 0.6 | 0.7 | Did not exist | Did not exist | 1.0 | 30.0 | | 15.7 |
| 16–17 Mar | Asahi Shimbun | 35 | 5 | 1 | 0 | 4 | 3 | 2 | 0 | 0 | Did not exist | Did not exist | 0 | 41 | 9 | 6 |
| 16–17 Mar | Mainichi Shimbun | 32 | 9 | 0 | 0 | 5 | 4 | 2 | 1 | 1 | Did not exist | Did not exist | 0 | 39 | —N/a | 7 |
| 8–11 Mar | Jiji Press | 25.5 | 4.3 | 0.7 | 0.1 | 2.8 | 2.3 | 1.4 | 0.2 | 0.2 | Did not exist | Did not exist | —N/a | 60.7 | —N/a | 35.2 |
| 9–10 Mar | Kyodo News | 38.3 | 10.5 | 0.8 | 0.7 | 4.3 | 3.7 | 2.7 | 0.7 | 0.3 | Did not exist | Did not exist | 0.2 | 35.2 | 2.6 | 3.1 |
| 8–10 Mar | NHK | 36.7 | 5.5 | 1.0 | 0.1 | 3.4 | 2.8 | 1.0 | 1.1 | 0.2 | Did not exist | Did not exist | 0.1 | 40.6 | 7.6 | 3.9 |
| 2–3 Mar | JNN | 38.8 | 5.7 | 1.1 | 0.2 | 3.7 | 2.2 | 1.8 | 0.2 | 0.9 | Did not exist | Did not exist | 0.4 | 40.0 | 5.1 | 1.2 |
| 23–24 Feb | ANN | 44.2 | 9.9 | 0.8 | 0.0 | 4.5 | 4.6 | 1.6 | 1.4 | 0.2 | Did not exist | Did not exist | 0.2 | 32.6 | | 11.6 |
| 22–24 Feb | Yomiuri Shimbun | 35 | 6 | 0 | 0 | 3 | 2 | 1 | 1 | 0 | Did not exist | Did not exist | 0 | 47 | 5 | 12 |
| 16–17 Feb | Asahi Shimbun | 37 | 6 | 1 | 0 | 3 | 2 | 1 | 0 | 0 | Did not exist | Did not exist | 1 | 41 | 8 | 4 |
| 15–17 Feb | Nikkei & TV Tokyo | 42 | 9 | 1 | 0 | 3 | 4 | 1 | 0 | 0 | Did not exist | Did not exist | 0 | 33 | 6 | 9 |
| 9–11 Feb | NHK | 37.1 | 5.7 | 0.6 | 0.0 | 3.3 | 3.1 | 1.2 | 0.4 | 0.2 | Did not exist | Did not exist | 0.1 | 41.5 | 6.7 | 4.4 |
| 8–11 Feb | Jiji Press | 25.4 | 3.4 | 0.3 | 0.1 | 3.3 | 1.8 | 1.0 | 0.6 | 0.3 | Did not exist | Did not exist | —N/a | 61.5 | —N/a | 36.1 |
| 2–3 Feb | JNN | 40.6 | 6.3 | 1.2 | 0.0 | 4.2 | 3.3 | 1.4 | 0.4 | 0.1 | Did not exist | Did not exist | 0.3 | 37.0 | 5.2 | 3.6 |
| 2–3 Feb | Kyodo News | 40.6 | 8.6 | 1.2 | 0.6 | 3.7 | 3.8 | 2.8 | 1.1 | 0.8 | Did not exist | Did not exist | 0.0 | 35.3 | 1.5 | 5.3 |
| 2–3 Feb | Mainichi Shimbun | 31 | 9 | 1 | 0 | 3 | 3 | 3 | 0 | 1 | Did not exist | Did not exist | 1 | 42 | —N/a | 11 |
| 26–27 Jan | ANN | 43.6 | 7.1 | 1.2 | 0.2 | 5.1 | 4.1 | 1.4 | 1.4 | 0.5 | Did not exist | Did not exist | 0.2 | 35.2 | | 8.4 |
| 25–27 Jan | Nikkei & TV Tokyo | 43 | 9 | 1 | 0 | 4 | 4 | 2 | 1 | 0 | Did not exist | Did not exist | 0 | 33 | 4 | 10 |
| 25–27 Jan | Yomiuri Shimbun | 38 | 6 | 1 | 0 | 3 | 2 | 1 | 0 | 0 | Did not exist | Did not exist | 0 | 45 | 4 | 7 |
| 19–20 Jan | Asahi Shimbun | 38 | 7 | 1 | 0 | 3 | 3 | 1 | 0 | 0 | Did not exist | Did not exist | 0 | 38 | 9 | Tied |
| 12–14 Jan | NHK | 35.2 | 6.0 | 1.0 | 0.0 | 5.5 | 2.7 | 0.8 | 0.2 | 0.2 | Did not exist | Did not exist | 0.0 | 42.5 | 5.9 | 7.3 |
| 12–13 Jan | JNN | 37.8 | 5.2 | 0.6 | 0.0 | 3.4 | 2.5 | 1.1 | 0.4 | 0.4 | Did not exist | Did not exist | 0.2 | 43.5 | 4.8 | 5.7 |
| 12–13 Jan | Kyodo News | 36.0 | 9.2 | 1.4 | 0.0 | 2.8 | 2.4 | 2.4 | 0.4 | 0.6 | Did not exist | Did not exist | 0.0 | 43.5 | 1.3 | 7.5 |
| 11–14 Jan | Jiji Press | 26.7 | 4.2 | 0.2 | 0.2 | 2.8 | 1.9 | 1.1 | 0.6 | 0.0 | Did not exist | Did not exist | —N/a | 60.0 | —N/a | 33.3 |
| 22 Oct 2017 | 2017 general election | 33.3 | 19.9 | 17.4 | | 12.5 | 7.9 | 6.1 | 0.8 | —N/a | —N/a | —N/a | 1.3 | —N/a | —N/a | 13.4 |

=== 2018 ===
| Fieldwork date | Polling firm | LDP | CDP | DPFP | DP | Kibō | Kōmeitō | JCP | Ishin | SDP | LP | Others | No party | Und./ no ans. | Lead |
|---|---|---|---|---|---|---|---|---|---|---|---|---|---|---|---|
| 13 Nov – 25 Dec | Asahi Shimbun | 37 | 8 | 1 | Did not exist | 0 | 3 | 3 | 1 | 1 | 1 | 0 | 42 | 3 | 5 |
| 15–16 Dec | ANN | 45.2 | 8.6 | 1.4 | Did not exist | 0.0 | 3.9 | 5.0 | 2.2 | 1.7 | 0.3 | 1.6 | 30.1 | | 15.1 |
| 15–16 Dec | Asahi Shimbun | 35 | 8 | 1 | Did not exist | 0 | 3 | 3 | 1 | 0 | 0 | 1 | 41 | 7 | 6 |
| 15–16 Dec | Kyodo News | 38.6 | 11.5 | 1.4 | Did not exist | 0.2 | 3.8 | 3.4 | 1.4 | 0.5 | 0.8 | 0.1 | 36.1 | 2.2 | 2.5 |
| 15–16 Dec | Mainichi Shimbun | 29 | 10 | 1 | Did not exist | 0 | 4 | 3 | 2 | 0 | 1 | 0 | 43 | —N/a | 14 |
| 14–16 Dec | Nikkei & TV Tokyo | 38 | 9 | 1 | Did not exist | 0 | 4 | 4 | 2 | 1 | 0 | 0 | 37 | 3 | 1 |
| 14–16 Dec | Yomiuri Shimbun | 34 | 8 | 1 | Did not exist | 0 | 4 | 3 | 1 | 0 | 0 | 0 | 46 | 3 | 12 |
| 7–10 Dec | Jiji Press | 21.3 | 4.6 | 1.0 | Did not exist | 0.2 | 3.4 | 1.6 | 0.8 | 0.2 | 0.1 | —N/a | 65.1 | —N/a | 43.8 |
| 17 Oct – 10 Dec | Mainichi & SSRC | 32 | 7 | 1 | Did not exist | 0 | 2 | 3 | 2 | 0 | 0 | 0 | 50 | —N/a | 18 |
| 8–9 Dec | NHK | 34.5 | 7.6 | 0.9 | Did not exist | 0.2 | 3.6 | 3.0 | 0.6 | 0.4 | 0.2 | 0.3 | 41.1 | 7.6 | 6.6 |
| 1–2 Dec | JNN | 39.0 | 6.4 | 1.0 | Did not exist | 0.1 | 3.2 | 2.2 | 0.9 | 0.5 | 0.3 | 0.9 | 41.4 | 4.1 | 2.4 |
| 23–25 Nov | Nikkei & TV Tokyo | 40 | 9 | 1 | Did not exist | 0 | 4 | 3 | 1 | 0 | 0 | 0 | 38 | 4 | 2 |
| 23–25 Nov | Yomiuri Shimbun | 41 | 7 | 0 | Did not exist | 0 | 4 | 2 | 1 | 0 | 0 | 0 | 42 | 3 | 1 |
| 17–18 Nov | ANN | 46.1 | 10.2 | 2.0 | Did not exist | 0.0 | 3.7 | 4.3 | 1.3 | 0.7 | 0.6 | 0.7 | 30.4 | | 15.7 |
| 17–18 Nov | Asahi Shimbun | 36 | 7 | 1 | Did not exist | 0 | 3 | 3 | 1 | 0 | 0 | 1 | 41 | 7 | 5 |
| 17–18 Nov | Mainichi Shimbun | 29 | 12 | 1 | Did not exist | 0 | 5 | 3 | 2 | 0 | 0 | 1 | 41 | —N/a | 12 |
| 9–12 Nov | Jiji Press | 26.8 | 4.3 | 0.6 | Did not exist | 0.1 | 4.0 | 2.4 | 1.0 | 0.2 | 0.2 | —N/a | 58.3 | —N/a | 31.5 |
| 9–11 Nov | NHK | 37.4 | 6.2 | 1.5 | Did not exist | 0.1 | 3.7 | 2.9 | 0.4 | 0.7 | 0.4 | 0.2 | 40.7 | 5.8 | 3.3 |
| 3–4 Nov | JNN | 37.3 | 4.9 | 1.2 | Did not exist | 0.5 | 4.3 | 3.0 | 1.1 | 0.4 | 0.1 | 0.3 | 44.0 | 3.0 | 6.7 |
| 3–4 Nov | Kyodo News | 45.2 | 9.1 | 1.3 | Did not exist | 0.3 | 5.3 | 3.6 | 1.9 | 0.8 | 0.8 | 0.0 | 30.2 | 1.5 | 15.0 |
| 26–28 Oct | Nikkei & TV Tokyo | 40 | 9 | 1 | Did not exist | 0 | 4 | 4 | 1 | 0 | 0 | 0 | 36 | 5 | 4 |
| 26–28 Oct | Yomiuri Shimbun | 37 | 5 | 1 | Did not exist | 0 | 3 | 2 | 1 | 0 | 0 | 0 | 46 | 2 | 9 |
| 20–21 Oct | ANN | 43.2 | 10.4 | 1.4 | Did not exist | 0.0 | 3.1 | 4.5 | 1.2 | 1.0 | 0.0 | 0.4 | 34.8 | | 8.4 |
| 13–14 Oct | Asahi Shimbun | 37 | 6 | 1 | Did not exist | 0 | 2 | 2 | 1 | 0 | 0 | 0 | 40 | 11 | 3 |
| 13–14 Oct | JNN | 38.4 | 5.3 | 1.3 | Did not exist | 0.3 | 3.9 | 2.5 | 1.0 | 0.8 | 0.3 | 0.5 | 42.0 | 3.7 | 3.6 |
| 6–8 Oct | NHK | 36.3 | 6.1 | 0.8 | Did not exist | 0.2 | 3.3 | 2.7 | 0.5 | 0.5 | 0.6 | 0.2 | 41.5 | 7.5 | 5.2 |
| 5–8 Oct | Jiji Press | 27.7 | 4.5 | 0.1 | Did not exist | 0.1 | 2.7 | 1.8 | 0.8 | 1.0 | 0.2 | —N/a | 59.2 | —N/a | 31.5 |
| 6–7 Oct | Mainichi Shimbun | 31 | 11 | 0 | Did not exist | 0 | 4 | 3 | 2 | 1 | 1 | 1 | 40 | —N/a | 9 |
| 2–3 Oct | Kyodo News | 44.8 | 8.7 | 1.0 | Did not exist | 0.5 | 4.4 | 2.2 | 2.6 | 0.8 | 0.6 | 0.0 | 33.0 | 1.4 | 11.8 |
| 2–3 Oct | Nikkei & TV Tokyo | 46 | 8 | 1 | Did not exist | 0 | 4 | 3 | 2 | 0 | 0 | 0 | 33 | 3 | 13 |
| 2–3 Oct | Yomiuri Shimbun | 43 | 5 | 0 | Did not exist | 0 | 3 | 2 | 1 | 0 | 0 | 0 | 42 | 2 | 1 |
| 21–23 Sep | Nikkei & TV Tokyo | 48 | 6 | 1 | Did not exist | 0 | 4 | 3 | 1 | 1 | 0 | 0 | 32 | 4 | 16 |
| 21–23 Sep | Yomiuri Shimbun | 40 | 6 | 1 | Did not exist | 0 | 4 | 2 | 1 | 0 | 0 | 0 | 45 | 3 | 5 |
| 20–21 Sep | Kyodo News | 46.2 | 6.3 | 1.5 | Did not exist | 0.3 | 3.3 | 3.2 | 2.1 | 1.0 | 0.4 | —N/a | 33.4 | 2.3 | 12.8 |
| 20 Sep | Shinzō Abe wins the Liberal Democratic Party leadership election, securing a new 3-year term as leader of the party. | | | | | | | | | | | | | | |
| 15–17 Sep | NHK | 35.8 | 4.8 | 0.7 | Did not exist | 0.1 | 4.1 | 3.0 | 0.3 | 0.5 | 0.2 | 0.2 | 43.0 | 7.4 | 7.2 |
| 15–16 Sep | ANN | 46.6 | 6.7 | 1.5 | Did not exist | 0.1 | 3.9 | 2.8 | 1.9 | 1.5 | 0.6 | 0.9 | 33.5 | | 13.1 |
| 7–10 Sep | Jiji Press | 26.9 | 4.4 | 0.4 | Did not exist | 0.2 | 4.1 | 1.9 | 0.9 | 0.3 | 0.0 | —N/a | 59.2 | —N/a | 32.3 |
| 8–9 Sep | Asahi Shimbun | 40 | 5 | 1 | Did not exist | 0 | 2 | 3 | 1 | 0 | 0 | 0 | 36 | 12 | 4 |
| 1–2 Sep | JNN | 30.5 | 5.5 | 0.5 | Did not exist | 0.0 | 1.8 | 2.8 | 0.8 | 0.8 | 0.2 | 0.8 | 54.2 | 2.2 | 23.7 |
| 1–2 Sep | Mainichi Shimbun | 33 | 9 | 1 | Did not exist | 0 | 3 | 3 | 1 | 1 | 1 | 0 | 40 | —N/a | 7 |
| 25–26 Aug | Kyodo News | 43.8 | 8.8 | 1.5 | Did not exist | 0.7 | 2.3 | 3.2 | 2.6 | 1.3 | 0.8 | | 32.8 | | 11.0 |
| 24–26 Aug | Nikkei & TV Tokyo | 45 | 10 | 1 | Did not exist | 0 | 3 | 3 | 1 | 1 | 0 | | 33 | 3 | 12 |
| 24–26 Aug | Yomiuri Shimbun | 40 | 4 | 1 | Did not exist | 0 | 2 | 2 | 1 | 0 | 0 | 0 | 45 | 3 | 5 |
| 18–19 Aug | ANN | 44.0 | 10.7 | 0.7 | Did not exist | 0.1 | 3.8 | 5.6 | 1.6 | 0.7 | 0.1 | 0.7 | 32.0 | | 12.0 |
| 3–6 Aug | Jiji Press | 27.1 | 4.6 | 0.5 | Did not exist | 0.0 | 3.3 | 2.3 | 0.9 | 0.3 | 0.2 | —N/a | 58.9 | —N/a | 31.8 |
| 4–5 Aug | Asahi Shimbun | 36 | 6 | 1 | Did not exist | 0 | 3 | 4 | 1 | 1 | 0 | 1 | 41 | 6 | 5 |
| 4–5 Aug | JNN | 31.7 | 7.5 | 0.5 | Did not exist | 0.2 | 3.4 | 1.8 | 1.5 | 0.6 | 0.3 | 0.8 | 50.7 | 1.1 | 19.0 |
| 3–5 Aug | NHK | 35.6 | 5.6 | 0.4 | Did not exist | 0.0 | 4.1 | 2.7 | 0.9 | 0.3 | 0.3 | 0.0 | 43.2 | 6.8 | 7.6 |
| 28–29 Jul | Mainchi Shimbun | 30 | 10 | 1 | Did not exist | 1 | 2 | 4 | 2 | 1 | 1 | 1 | 42 | —N/a | 12 |
| 21–22 Jul | ANN | 42.1 | 13.1 | 1.4 | Did not exist | 0.1 | 4.3 | 3.7 | 0.9 | 0.7 | 0.3 | 1.1 | 32.3 | | 9.8 |
| 21–22 Jul | Kyodo News | 41.6 | 12.4 | 0.9 | Did not exist | 0.4 | 2.9 | 3.0 | 2.1 | 0.5 | 0.5 | | 32.8 | | 8.8 |
| 21–22 Jul | Yomiuri Shimbun | 41 | 8 | 0 | Did not exist | 0 | 3 | 3 | 1 | 1 | 0 | 0 | 41 | 2 | Tied |
| 20–22 Jul | Nikkei & TV Tokyo | 38 | 12 | 1 | Did not exist | 0 | 3 | 4 | 2 | 1 | 0 | 0 | 36 | 4 | 2 |
| 14–15 Jul | Asahi Shimbun | 34 | 8 | 1 | Did not exist | 0 | 4 | 3 | 1 | 1 | 0 | 1 | 39 | 8 | 5 |
| 6–9 Jul | Jiji Press | 25.4 | 4.7 | 0.6 | Did not exist | 0.2 | 3.7 | 2.1 | 1.1 | 1.0 | 0.0 | —N/a | 58.2 | —N/a | 32.8 |
| 7–8 Jul | JNN | 29.8 | 8.0 | 0.6 | Did not exist | 0.1 | 3.0 | 3.2 | 1.3 | 1.6 | 0.0 | 0.7 | 50.4 | 1.5 | 20.6 |
| 6–8 Jul | NHK | 38.1 | 7.5 | 0.7 | Did not exist | 0.1 | 2.7 | 3.1 | 0.8 | 0.4 | 0.3 | 0.2 | 39.1 | 7.0 | 1.0 |
| 23–24 Jun | Mainichi Shimbun | 30 | 11 | 0 | Did not exist | 0 | 4 | 2 | 2 | 1 | 0 | 1 | 41 | —N/a | 11 |
| 22–24 Jun | Nikkei & TV Tokyo | 44 | 9 | 0 | Did not exist | 0 | 4 | 4 | 1 | 1 | 0 | 0 | 30 | 6 | 14 |
| 16–17 Jun | ANN | 47.7 | 11.2 | 1.5 | Did not exist | 0.2 | 3.0 | 3.0 | 1.1 | 1.1 | 0.2 | 0.7 | 30.3 | | 17.4 |
| 16–17 Jun | Asahi Shimbun | 34 | 9 | 1 | Did not exist | 0 | 3 | 3 | 1 | 0 | 0 | 1 | 40 | 8 | 6 |
| 15–17 Jun | NTV | 38.9 | 10.2 | 0.4 | Did not exist | 0.3 | 3.4 | 2.9 | 1.9 | 0.8 | 0.0 | 0.0 | 41.1 | 0.1 | 2.2 |
| 15–17 Jun | Yomiuri Shimbun | 38 | 6 | 1 | Did not exist | 0 | 3 | 3 | 0 | 0 | 0 | 0 | 44 | 3 | 6 |
| 8–11 Jun | Jiji Press | 25.8 | 5.2 | 0.6 | Did not exist | 0.1 | 3.8 | 2.0 | 1.1 | 0.4 | 0.1 | —N/a | 58.9 | —N/a | 33.1 |
| 8–10 Jun | NHK | 35.8 | 8.9 | 1.1 | Did not exist | 0.0 | 2.4 | 4.1 | 0.7 | 1.2 | 0.0 | 0.2 | 38.2 | 7.4 | 2.4 |
| 2–3 Jun | JNN | 30.8 | 10.7 | 0.5 | Did not exist | 0.2 | 3.2 | 4.0 | 2.2 | 0.6 | 0.3 | 0.9 | 44.4 | 2.3 | 13.6 |
| 26–27 May | Mainichi Shimbun | 26 | 13 | 1 | Did not exist | 1 | 4 | 4 | 2 | 0 | 1 | 1 | 40 | —N/a | 14 |
| 25–27 May | Nikkei & TV Tokyo | 42 | 12 | 1 | Did not exist | 0 | 4 | 4 | 2 | 1 | 0 | 0 | 30 | 5 | 12 |
| 19–20 May | ANN | 41.4 | 15.2 | 1.5 | Did not exist | 0.7 | 4.1 | 5.7 | 1.6 | 1.3 | 0.4 | 1.2 | 26.9 | | 3.5 |
| 19–20 May | Asahi Shimbun | 36 | 9 | 1 | Did not exist | 0 | 3 | 3 | 1 | 0 | 0 | 0 | 39 | 8 | 3 |
| 18–20 May | NTV | 36.7 | 12.2 | 0.5 | Did not exist | 0.4 | 3.7 | 3.2 | 1.4 | 1.2 | 0.5 | 0.3 | 39.8 | 0.3 | 3.1 |
| 18–20 May | Yomiuri Shimbun | 37 | 7 | 2 | Did not exist | 0 | 4 | 3 | 2 | 0 | 0 | 0 | 42 | 3 | 5 |
| 11–14 May | Jiji Press | 26.8 | 5.0 | 0.6 | Did not exist | 0.2 | 4.4 | 1.7 | 0.7 | 0.4 | 0.2 | —N/a | 57.7 | —N/a | 30.9 |
| 12–13 May | JNN | 30.4 | 8.3 | 0.8 | Did not exist | 0.3 | 3.7 | 2.5 | 1.8 | 0.3 | 0.1 | 0.9 | 49.1 | 1.9 | 18.7 |
| 12–13 May | Kyodo News | 37.1 | 13.3 | 1.1 | Did not exist | 0.7 | 3.7 | 4.5 | 1.5 | 0.8 | 0.7 | | 34.2 | | 2.9 |
| 11–13 May | NHK | 35.9 | 7.9 | 1.1 | Did not exist | 0.1 | 3.5 | 2.3 | 0.7 | 0.3 | 0.3 | 0.3 | 40.4 | 7.3 | 4.5 |
| 7 May | The Democratic Party merges with a majority of Kibō no Tō members to form the Democratic Party For the People. | | | | | | | | | | | | | | |
| 27–29 Apr | Nikkei & TV Tokyo | 40 | 14 | Did not exist | 1 | 0 | 3 | 3 | 2 | 0 | 0 | 0 | 32 | 4 | 8 |
| 14 Mar – 25 Apr | Asahi Shimbun | 33 | 12 | Did not exist | 1 | 1 | 4 | 3 | 2 | 1 | 1 | 0 | 42 | 0 | 9 |
| 21–22 Apr | ANN | 37.6 | 13.6 | Did not exist | 2.9 | 0.4 | 3.1 | 4.1 | 1.9 | 1.6 | 0.5 | 0.2 | 34.1 | | 3.5 |
| 21–22 Apr | Mainichi Shimbun | 29 | 13 | Did not exist | 1 | 1 | 3 | 3 | 2 | 1 | 0 | 2 | 40 | —N/a | 11 |
| 20–22 Apr | Yomiuri Shimbun | 37 | 10 | Did not exist | 2 | 1 | 2 | 3 | 1 | 0 | 0 | 0 | 40 | 3 | 3 |
| 14–15 Apr | Asahi Shimbun | 33 | 10 | Did not exist | 2 | 0 | 4 | 3 | 1 | 0 | 0 | 0 | 40 | 7 | 7 |
| 13–15 Apr | NTV | 33.4 | 9.5 | Did not exist | 1.2 | 0.7 | 4.0 | 3.4 | 2.2 | 0.9 | 0.3 | 0.1 | 44.4 | 0.0 | 1.0 |
| 6–9 Apr | Jiji Press | 25.3 | 5.1 | Did not exist | 0.7 | 0.4 | 3.9 | 2.4 | 1.0 | 0.7 | 0.0 | —N/a | 58.3 | —N/a | 33.0 |
| 7–8 Apr | JNN | 31.7 | 8.8 | Did not exist | 1.8 | 1.1 | 3.1 | 2.4 | 1.8 | 0.1 | 0.1 | 0.8 | 47.3 | 1.1 | 15.6 |
| 6–8 Apr | NHK | 35.4 | 8.5 | Did not exist | 1.4 | 0.3 | 3.5 | 2.9 | 0.8 | 0.5 | 0.3 | 0.2 | 39.2 | 7.0 | 3.8 |
| 31 Mar – 1 Apr | Kyodo News | 39.1 | 14.2 | Did not exist | 0.9 | 1.3 | 3.9 | 3.9 | 2.2 | 0.6 | 0.7 | | 32.0 | | 7.1 |
| 31 Mar – 1 Apr | Yomiuri Shimbun | 36 | 9 | Did not exist | 1 | 0 | 3 | 2 | 1 | 1 | 0 | 0 | 41 | 4 | 5 |
| 24–25 Mar | ANN | 40.6 | 16.2 | Did not exist | 3.7 | 0.9 | 3.8 | 4.9 | 1.1 | 1.3 | 0.3 | 0.8 | 26.4 | | 14.2 |
| 23–25 Mar | Nikkei & TV Tokyo | 40 | 12 | Did not exist | 2 | 1 | 4 | 4 | 1 | 0 | 0 | 0 | 31 | 5 | 9 |
| 17–18 Mar | Asahi Shimbun | 32 | 11 | Did not exist | 1 | 1 | 3 | 3 | 1 | 0 | 0 | 0 | 36 | 12 | 4 |
| 17–18 Mar | Kyodo News | 36.2 | 11.5 | Did not exist | 2.8 | 1.0 | 3.2 | 2.9 | 3.1 | 1.1 | 0.4 | | 36.5 | | 0.3 |
| 17–18 Mar | Mainichi Shimbun | 29 | 13 | Did not exist | 1 | 1 | 3 | 4 | 2 | | | | 39 | —N/a | 10 |
| 16–18 Mar | NTV | 33.3 | 10.3 | Did not exist | 2.0 | 0.9 | 3.7 | 3.9 | 1.3 | 1.7 | 0.5 | 0.7 | 41.7 | 0.1 | 8.4 |
| 9–12 Mar | Jiji Press | 25.2 | 5.3 | Did not exist | 1.2 | 0.5 | 2.9 | 2.6 | 0.8 | 0.6 | 0.1 | —N/a | 58.3 | —N/a | 33.1 |
| 9–11 Mar | NHK | 36.3 | 10.2 | Did not exist | 1.2 | 0.6 | 3.1 | 2.6 | 1.2 | 0.7 | 0.2 | 0.0 | 37.9 | 5.9 | 1.6 |
| 9–11 Mar | Yomiuri Shimbun | 38 | 9 | Did not exist | 1 | 1 | 4 | 3 | 1 | 0 | 0 | 0 | 38 | 3 | Tied |
| 3–4 Mar | JNN | 30.3 | 11.4 | Did not exist | 1.1 | 0.8 | 3.8 | 3.6 | 0.9 | 0.4 | 0.0 | 1.1 | 44.9 | 1.7 | 14.6 |
| 3–4 Mar | Kyodo News | 39.5 | 11.1 | Did not exist | 1.4 | 1.6 | 3.7 | 3.7 | 2.6 | 0.3 | 0.6 | | 34.1 | | 5.4 |
| 24–25 Feb | ANN | 44.9 | 13.3 | Did not exist | 1.5 | 1.1 | 3.7 | 5.4 | 2.3 | 1.8 | 0.1 | 0.5 | 25.4 | | 19.5 |
| 24–25 Feb | Mainichi Shimbun | 35 | 13 | Did not exist | 1 | 0 | 3 | 3 | 3 | 0 | 1 | 1 | 37 | —N/a | 2 |
| 23–25 Feb | Nikkei | 42 | 11 | Did not exist | 2 | 1 | 4 | 2 | 3 | 1 | | | 31 | 4 | 11 |
| 17–18 Feb | Asahi Shimbun | 35 | 10 | Did not exist | 1 | 1 | 3 | 4 | 1 | 1 | 0 | 0 | 38 | 6 | 3 |
| 16–18 Feb | NTV | 36.7 | 11.1 | Did not exist | 2.3 | 1.2 | 4.1 | 4.0 | 1.6 | 1.1 | 0.1 | 0.1 | 37.3 | 0.4 | 0.6 |
| 10–12 Feb | NHK | 38.7 | 8.3 | Did not exist | 1.4 | 0.4 | 2.1 | 2.7 | 1.1 | 0.4 | 0.6 | 0.2 | 36.8 | 7.4 | 1.9 |
| 9–12 Feb | Jiji Press | 28.5 | 4.2 | Did not exist | 0.9 | 0.3 | 3.9 | 1.8 | 1.1 | 0.3 | 0.1 | —N/a | 57.6 | —N/a | 29.1 |
| 10–11 Feb | Kyodo News | 41.2 | 10.9 | Did not exist | 0.9 | 2.0 | 4.0 | 2.7 | 2.9 | 0.7 | 0.7 | | 33.4 | | 7.8 |
| 10–11 Feb | Yomiuri Shimbun | 42 | 9 | Did not exist | 2 | 1 | 3 | 2 | 1 | 0 | 0 | 0 | 36 | 2 | 6 |
| 3–4 Feb | JNN | 32.9 | 10.6 | Did not exist | 1.0 | 0.8 | 3.4 | 2.8 | 1.8 | 0.3 | 0.3 | 0.9 | 43.3 | 1.8 | 10.4 |
| 26–28 Jan | Nikkei | 43 | 9 | Did not exist | 2 | 1 | 2 | 4 | 1 | 0 | 0 | 1 | 32 | 7 | 11 |
| 26–28 Jan | NTV | 31.5 | 13.0 | Did not exist | 1.4 | 1.0 | 3.8 | 2.8 | 1.6 | 1.0 | 0.8 | 0.8 | 41.8 | 0.5 | 10.3 |
| 20–21 Jan | Asahi Shimbun | 39 | 9 | Did not exist | 1 | 1 | 4 | 3 | 1 | 0 | 0 | 1 | 34 | 7 | 5 |
| 20–21 Jan | ANN | 42.3 | 16.6 | Did not exist | 3.0 | 1.2 | 3.6 | 4.8 | 2.0 | 0.9 | 0.2 | 1.1 | 24.3 | | 18.0 |
| 20–21 Jan | Mainichi Shimbun | 30 | 14 | Did not exist | 0 | 2 | 3 | 4 | 2 | 0 | 1 | 0 | 37 | —N/a | 7 |
| 12–15 Jan | Jiji Press | 28.1 | 6.2 | Did not exist | 0.8 | 0.6 | 3.4 | 2.0 | 0.9 | 0.2 | 0.0 | —N/a | 56.0 | —N/a | 27.9 |
| 13–14 Jan | Kyodo News | 38.4 | 12.7 | Did not exist | 1.3 | 1.2 | 2.8 | 3.8 | 2.4 | 0.6 | 0.1 | 0.0 | 35.4 | 1.3 | 3.0 |
| 13–14 Jan | JNN | 33.8 | 11.3 | Did not exist | 1.2 | 0.6 | 3.3 | 3.5 | 1.8 | 0.4 | 0.1 | 0.8 | 41.3 | 1.9 | 7.5 |
| 12–14 Jan | Yomiuri Shimbun | 39 | 8 | Did not exist | 1 | 1 | 4 | 2 | 1 | 1 | 0 | 0 | 40 | 2 | 1 |
| 6–8 Jan | NHK | 38.1 | 9.2 | Did not exist | 1.3 | 1.0 | 2.4 | 3.6 | 1.0 | 0.3 | 0.0 | 0.4 | 36.6 | 6.2 | 1.5 |
| 22 Oct 2017 | 2017 general election | 33.3 | 19.9 | Did not exist | 17.4 | | 12.5 | 7.9 | 6.1 | 0.8 | —N/a | 1.3 | —N/a | —N/a | 13.4 |

=== 2017 ===
| Fieldwork date | Polling firm | LDP | CDP | DP | Kibō | Kōmeitō | JCP | Ishin | SDP | LP | Others | No party | Und./ no ans. | Lead |
|---|---|---|---|---|---|---|---|---|---|---|---|---|---|---|
| 16–17 Dec | Asahi Shimbun | 36 | 9 | 1 | 1 | 3 | 3 | 1 | 0 | 0 | 0 | 36 | 10 | Tied |
| 15–17 Dec | Nikkei & TV Tokyo | 40 | 10 | 1 | 1 | 3 | 4 | 2 | 1 | 0 | 0 | 33 | 4 | 7 |
| 15–17 Dec | NTV | 34.3 | 10.5 | 2.4 | 1.2 | 2.7 | 4.3 | 1.6 | 0.7 | 0.0 | 0.7 | 41.2 | 0.3 | 6.9 |
| 8–11 Dec | Jiji Press | 24.8 | 5.0 | 1.8 | 0.9 | 4.1 | 1.7 | 1.0 | 0.6 | 0.0 | —N/a | 58.7 | —N/a | 33.9 |
| 9–10 Dec | ANN | 42.3 | 14.5 | 2.7 | 1.8 | 5.3 | 3.9 | 2.3 | 0.4 | 0.4 | 0.0 | 26.4 | | 15.9 |
| 8–10 Dec | NHK | 38.1 | 7.9 | 1.8 | 1.4 | 4.1 | 3.5 | 1.5 | 0.6 | 0.2 | 0.1 | 34.1 | 6.9 | 4.0 |
| 8–10 Dec | Yomiuri Shimbun | 40 | 9 | 1 | 2 | 3 | 2 | 1 | 0 | 0 | 0 | 39 | 2 | 1 |
| 18 Oct – 6 Dec | Mainichi & SSRC | 35 | 12 | 1 | 7 | 4 | 3 | 3 | 1 | 0 | 0 | 33 | —N/a | 2 |
| 2–3 Dec | Kyodo News | 37.1 | 12.5 | 1.8 | 3.2 | 2.7 | 3.1 | 2.2 | 1.1 | 0.3 | —N/a | 34.4 | 1.6 | 2.7 |
| 2–3 Dec | JNN | 35.7 | 9.8 | 1.2 | 1.0 | 3.1 | 3.7 | 1.1 | 0.7 | 0.2 | 0.9 | 41.3 | 1.4 | 5.6 |
| 24–26 Nov | Nikkei | 39 | 14 | 1 | 2 | 5 | 3 | 2 | 0 | 0 | | 30 | 3 | 9 |
| 17–19 Nov | NTV | 32.8 | 10.4 | 1.0 | 2.7 | 3.8 | 3.6 | 2.7 | 1.0 | 0.3 | 0.7 | 41.1 | 0.0 | 8.3 |
| 10–13 Nov | Jiji Press | 27.9 | 5.4 | 1.2 | 1.5 | 3.6 | 1.8 | 1.3 | 0.3 | 0.1 | —N/a | 55.0 | —N/a | 27.1 |
| 11–12 Nov | Mainichi Shimbun | 34 | 14 | 0 | 4 | 4 | 3 | 2 | 0 | 0 | 1 | 34 | —N/a | Tied |
| 11–12 Nov | Asahi Shimbun | 37 | 12 | 1 | 3 | 3 | 3 | 2 | 1 | 0 | 1 | 30 | 7 | 7 |
| 11–12 Nov | JNN | 35.6 | 11.0 | 1.9 | 3.4 | 4.0 | 3.4 | 2.9 | 0.8 | 0.2 | 0.3 | 34.9 | 1.6 | 0.7 |
| 10–12 Nov | NHK | 37.1 | 9.6 | 1.3 | 3.2 | 5.2 | 3.1 | 1.1 | 0.6 | 0.1 | 0.2 | 32.4 | 6.1 | 4.7 |
| 4–5 Nov | ANN | 43.7 | 19.9 | 2.2 | 4.4 | 4.3 | 6.1 | 2.7 | 0.8 | 0.3 | 0.3 | 15.3 | | 23.8 |
| 1–2 Nov | Nikkei & TV Tokyo | 44 | 14 | 1 | 4 | 5 | 4 | 3 | 0 | 0 | 0 | 23 | 2 | 21 |
| 1–2 Nov | Yomiuri Shimbun | 42 | 14 | 2 | 5 | 3 | 3 | 2 | 0 | 0 | 0 | 25 | 3 | 17 |
| 23–24 Oct | Asahi Shimbun | 39 | 17 | 0 | 3 | 4 | 3 | 2 | 1 | 0 | 0 | 21 | 10 | 18 |
| 23–24 Oct | Yomiuri Shimbun | 43 | 14 | 1 | 5 | 4 | 3 | 2 | 1 | 0 | 0 | 24 | 3 | 19 |
| 22 Oct 2017 | 2017 general election | 33.3 | 19.9 | —N/a | 17.4 | 12.5 | 7.9 | 6.1 | 0.8 | —N/a | 1.3 | —N/a | —N/a | 13.4 |

== Voting intention (party vote) ==
=== 2021 ===
| Fieldwork date | Polling firm | LDP | CDP | NKP | JCP | Ishin | DPFP | SDP | Reiwa | N-Koku | Oth./ WV | Und./ no ans. | Lead |
|---|---|---|---|---|---|---|---|---|---|---|---|---|---|
| 31 Oct 2021 | 2021 general election | 34.7 | 20.0 | 12.4 | 7.3 | 14.0 | 4.5 | 1.8 | 3.9 | 1.4 | 1.7 | —N/a | 14.7 |
| 23–24 Oct | go2senkyo | 32.0 | 21.3 | 8.4 | 7.6 | 12.3 | 2.4 | 1.4 | 1.6 | 0.9 | 0.8 | 11.3 | 10.7 |
| 23–24 Oct | Kyodo News | 29.9 | 11.6 | | | | | | | | | | 18.3 |
| 19–20 Oct | Asahi Shimbun | 38 | 13 | 7 | 5 | 4 | 2 | 1 | 1 | 1 | 2 | 23 | 25 |
| 16–17 Oct | Kyodo News | 29.6 | 9.7 | 4.7 | 4.8 | 3.9 | 0.7 | 0.5 | 0.5 | 0.1 | | 39.4 | 19.9 |
| 16–17 Oct | go2senkyo | 33.1 | 21.0 | 6.6 | 8.2 | 9.0 | 2.6 | 1.3 | 1.4 | 0.5 | 2.1 | 14.3 | 12.1 |
| 14–15 Oct | Yomiuri Shimbun | 44 | 12 | 6 | 5 | 5 | 1 | 1 | 1 | 0 | 0 | 24 | 32 |
| 8–11 Oct | Jiji Press | 43.6 | 11.8 | 5.9 | 3.2 | 3.6 | 1.6 | 0.5 | 0.3 | 0.4 | | 28.3 | 31.8 |
| 9–10 Oct | Green Ship | 36.3 | 19.0 | 6.3 | 7.3 | 7.9 | 2.1 | 1 | 2 | 1 | 1 | 16.9 | 17.3 |
| 9–10 Oct | FNN-Sankei | 39.1 | 9.5 | 3.6 | 3.2 | 3.4 | 1.0 | 0.6 | 0.4 | 0.1 | 4.1 | 35.0 | 29.6 |
| 9–10 Oct | JNN | 38.3 | 9.8 | 4.8 | 4.0 | 3.3 | 1.4 | 0.4 | 0.4 | 0.1 | 3.8 | 33.7 | 28.5 |
| 4–5 Oct | Asahi Shimbun | 41 | 13 | 5 | 4 | 6 | 2 | 1 | 1 | 1 | 2 | 24 | 28 |
| 4–5 Oct | Yomiuri Shimbun | 48 | 13 | 5 | 3 | 5 | 1 | 0 | 1 | 0 | 1 | 24 | 35 |
| 4–5 Oct | Kyodo News | 44.6 | 14.9 | 5.8 | 2.8 | 7.1 | | | | | | | 29.7 |
| 4–5 Oct | Nikkei | 53 | 11 | 4 | 5 | 5 | 1 | 1 | 1 | | | 20 | 42 |
| 4 Oct | Fumio Kishida assumes office as the Prime Minister and President of the LDP. | | | | | | | | | | | | |
| 23–25 Sep | Nikkei | 52 | 10 | 4 | 4 | 6 | 1 | 1 | 2 | | | 20 | 42 |
| 18–19 Sep | ANN | 42.3 | 9.5 | 3.9 | 4.1 | 2.7 | 1.3 | 0.1 | 0.1 | 0 | 3.3 | 32.7 | 32.8 |
| 18–19 Sep | FNN-Sankei | 44.9 | 9.4 | 3.4 | 2.7 | 3.1 | 0.6 | 0.2 | 0.5 | 0.1 | 4.4 | 30.9 | 35.5 |
| 18 Sep | Mainichi Shimbun | 35 | 14 | 5 | 6 | 7 | 2 | | 2 | | | 28 | 21 |
| 10–13 Sep | Jiji Press | 49.9 | 10.8 | 6.2 | 3.7 | 4.5 | | | | | | 22.5 | 39.1 |
| 11–12 Sep | Asahi Shimbun | 43 | 11 | 6 | 6 | 6 | 2 | 1 | 1 | 0 | 2 | 22 | 32 |
| 9-11 Sep | Nikkei | 53 | 12 | 2 | 5 | 4 | 1 | 0 | 1 | 0 | 0 | 22 | 41 |
| 4–5 Sep | Green Ship | 36.9 | 7.2 | 2.8 | 4.0 | 5.5 | 1.1 | 0.5 | 2.0 | 0.2 | 1.1 | 38.8 | 29.7 |
| 4–5 Sep | Yomiuri Shimbun | 42 | 11 | 4 | 5 | 4 | 1 | 1 | 1 | 0 | 0 | 31 | 31 |
| 3 Sep | Yoshihide Suga announces he will not seek re-election as President of the LDP. | | | | | | | | | | | | |
| 27–29 Aug | Nikkei & TV Tokyo | 43 | 14 | 4 | 5 | 5 | 1 | 0 | 1 | 1 | 0 | 25 | 29 |
| 28 Aug | Mainichi Shimbun | 24 | 14 | 4 | 6 | 8 | 2 | | 2 | | | 37 | 10 |
| 21–22 Aug | ANN | 32.8 | 8.7 | 3.2 | 3.9 | 2.8 | 1.0 | 0.2 | 0.6 | 0.1 | 3.6 | 43.1 | 24.1 |
| 21–22 Aug | FNN-Sankei | 35.6 | 9.8 | 4.1 | 3.7 | 4.6 | 1.2 | 0.4 | 0.7 | 0.5 | 4.5 | 35.0 | 25.8 |
| 14–15 Aug | go2senkyo | 29.7 | 18.4 | 5.7 | 9.6 | 8.5 | 1.5 | 0.6 | 2.1 | 0.4 | | 23.4 | 11.3 |
| 7–9 Aug | Yomiuri-NNN | 37 | 12 | 6 | 5 | 6 | 1 | 1 | 1 | 0 | 0 | 31 | 25 |
| 7–8 Aug | Asahi Shimbun | 35 | 15 | 5 | 6 | 7 | 3 | 0 | 1 | 1 | 1 | 26 | 20 |
| 17–18 Jul | FNN-Sankei | 32.3 | 10.8 | 3.1 | 4.6 | 2.8 | 1.0 | 0.9 | 0.4 | 0.0 | 8.6 | 35.6 | 21.5 |
| 10–11 Jul | go2senkyo | 30.2 | 19.8 | 5.6 | 10.9 | 7.4 | 1.7 | 1.4 | 1.1 | 0.2 | | 21.7 | 10.4 |
| 9-11 Jul | Yomiuri-NNN | 39 | 10 | 6 | 6 | 6 | 2 | 0 | 1 | 0 | 0 | 28 | 29 |
| 25–27 Jun | Nikkei | 41 | 14 | 4 | 4 | 7 | 1 | 1 | 2 | —N/a | —N/a | 27 | 27 |
| 19–20 Jun | FNN-Sankei | 34.0 | 10.1 | 3.3 | 2.5 | 3.9 | 1.0 | 0.5 | 0.2 | 0.3 | 2.8 | 34.6 | 23.9 |
| 19–20 Jun | Asahi | 35 | 14 | 7 | 5 | 7 | 3 | 1 | 2 | 0 | 3 | 23 | 21 |
| 12–13 Jun | go2senkyo | 29.1 | 21.1 | 6.3 | 9.4 | 6.9 | 1.7 | 0.9 | 1.8 | 0.3 | —N/a | 22.6 | 8 |
| 15–16 May | go2senkyo | 29.9 | 20.1 | 5.1 | 9.1 | 8.1 | 2.0 | 1.7 | 2.2 | 0.6 | —N/a | 21.1 | 9.8 |
| 15–16 May | FNN-Sankei | 33 | 10.6 | 4.6 | 2.3 | 4.5 | 0.6 | 0.5 | 0.7 | 0.5 | 2.2 | 40.4 | 22.4 |
| 15–16 May | Asahi Shimbun | 35 | 17 | 5 | 5 | 9 | 2 | 1 | 1 | 1 | 2 | 22 | 18 |
| 3 Mar – 12 Apr | Asahi Shimbun | 46 | 16 | 6 | 5 | 10 | 2 | 1 | 1 | 1 | 2 | 20 | 30 |
| 10–11 Apr | Asahi Shimbun | 40 | 14 | 6 | 6 | 8 | 2 | 1 | 2 | 0 | 2 | 19 | 26 |
| 2–4 April | Yomiuri-NNN | 44 | 13 | 5 | 4 | 5 | 1 | 0 | 1 | 1 | 0 | 25 | 31 |
| 20–21 Mar | Asahi Shimbun | 41 | 14 | 5 | 5 | 8 | 2 | 1 | 2 | 0 | 2 | 20 | 27 |
| 13–14 Feb | Asahi Shimbun | 37 | 16 | 6 | 7 | 8 | 2 | 1 | 2 | 1 | 2 | 18 | 21 |
| 5–7 Feb | Yomiuri-NNN | 41 | 12 | 5 | 3 | 5 | 2 | 1 | 1 | 1 | 0 | 28 | 29 |
| 15–17 Jan | Yomiuri-NNN | 40 | 13 | 5 | 4 | 4 | 2 | 1 | 2 | 1 | 1 | 28 | 27 |

=== 2020 ===
| Fieldwork date | Polling firm | LDP | CDP | Kōmeitō | JCP | Ishin | DPFP | SDP | Reiwa | Kibō | N-Koku | Oth./ WV | Und./ no ans. | Lead |
|---|---|---|---|---|---|---|---|---|---|---|---|---|---|---|
| 25–27 Dec | Nikkei | 41 | 12 | 3 | 4 | 8 | 1 | —N/a | 1 | —N/a | 1 | —N/a | 29 | 29 |
| 4–6 Dec | Yomiuri-NNN | 49 | 9 | 4 | 2 | 7 | 1 | 1 | 1 | —N/a | 1 | 1 | 24 | 40 |
| 27–29 Nov | Nikkei | 48 | 10 | 4 | 3 | 7 | 2 | 1 | 2 | —N/a | 1 | —N/a | 22 | 38 |
| 14–15 Nov | Asahi Shimbun | 45 | 12 | 6 | 4 | 6 | 1 | 1 | 1 | —N/a | 1 | 2 | 21 | 33 |
| 14–15 Nov | ANN | 40.9 | 10.4 | 3.8 | 3.5 | 3.8 | 0.6 | 1 | 0.6 | —N/a | 0.2 | 1.6 | 33.6 | 30.5 |
| 6–8 Nov | Yomiuri-NNN | 54 | 8 | 5 | 4 | 6 | 1 | 0 | 1 | —N/a | 1 | 0 | 20 | 46 |
| 17–18 Oct | Asahi Shimbun | 46 | 12 | 5 | 4 | 9 | 2 | 1 | 2 | —N/a | 1 | 1 | 17 | 34 |
| 16–18 Oct | Yomiuri Shimbun | 47 | 11 | 5 | 3 | 6 | 1 | 1 | 2 | —N/a | 1 | 1 | 14 | 36 |
| 17–18 Oct | ANN | 40.1 | 9.3 | 4.2 | 3.8 | 3.8 | 0.7 | 0.3 | 0.5 | —N/a | 0.1 | 2.0 | 35.2 | 30.8 |
| 19–20 Sep | Yomiuri-NNN | 55 | 8 | 6 | 3 | 6 | 1 | 0 | 1 | —N/a | 0 | —N/a | 20 | 47 |
| 19–20 Sep | ANN | 45.1 | 11.9 | 4.3 | 3.0 | 2.9 | 0.8 | 0.3 | 0.2 | —N/a | 0 | 3.5 | 28 | 33.2 |
| 16–17 Sep | Nikkei | 54 | 10 | 4 | 2 | 6 | 1 | 1 | 2 | —N/a | 1 | —N/a | 18 | 44 |
| 16–17 Sep | Asahi Shimbun | 48 | 12 | 6 | 4 | 8 | 1 | 1 | 2 | —N/a | 1 | 1.0 | 15 | 36 |
| 16 Sep | Yoshihide Suga assumes office as the Prime Minister and President of the LDP. | | | | | | | | | | | | | |
| 18–19 Jul | Asahi Shimbun | 35 | 13 | 6 | 5 | 10 | 3 | 2 | 2 | 1 | 2 | 3 | 18 | 22 |
| 13–14 Jun | go2senkyo | 30.6 | 18.4 | 5.3 | 7.8 | 12.5 | 2.2 | 1.6 | 3.1 | —N/a | 0.6 | —N/a | 17.8 | 12.2 |
| 4 Mar – 13 Apr | Asahi | 44 | 17 | 6 | 6 | 8 | 3 | 2 | 3 | —N/a | 2 | 2 | 7 | 27 |
| 22 Oct 2017 | 2017 general election | 33.3 | 19.9 | 12.5 | 7.9 | 6.1 | N/A | 0.8 | —N/a | 17.4 | 1.3 | —N/a | —N/a | 13.4 |

== Voting intention (district vote) ==
=== 2021 ===
| Fieldwork date | Polling firm | LDP | Kōmeitō | CDP | JCP | Ishin | DPFP | SDP | Reiwa | N-Koku | Oth./ WV | Und./ no ans. | Lead |
|---|---|---|---|---|---|---|---|---|---|---|---|---|---|
| 4–5 Oct | Mainichi Shimbun | 41 | | 34 | | | | | | | —N/a | 24 | 7 |

== Preferred outcome ==
=== 2021 ===
| Fieldwork date | Polling firm | LDP re-election | Change in government | Evenly matched | Government gains seats | Opposition gains seats | Neither / Same as now | Und./ no ans. |
|---|---|---|---|---|---|---|---|---|
| 23–24 Oct | Kyodo News | 34.6 | 11.4 | 49.4 | – | – | – | 4.6 |
| 22–24 Oct | NHK | – | – | – | 24.1 | 30.5 | 38.5 | 6.8 |
| 19–20 Oct | Asahi Shimbun | 46 | 22 | – | – | – | – | 32 |
| 16–17 Oct | Kyodo News | 36.3 | 13.9 | 45.2 | – | – | – | 4.6 |
| 16–17 Oct | go2senkyo | 43.7 | 23.8 | – | – | – | 32.5 | |
| 15–17 Oct | NHK | – | – | – | 25.1 | 30.9 | 39.0 | 5.0 |
| 14–15 Oct | Yomiuri Shimbun | 63 | 24 | – | – | – | – | 13 |
| 9–10 Oct | FNN-Sankei | – | – | – | 22.1 | 35.9 | 36.5 | 5.5 |
| 8–10 Oct | NHK | – | – | – | 25.4 | 28.3 | 40.9 | 5.4 |
| 4–5 Oct | Asahi Shimbun | – | – | – | 17 | 33 | 32 | 18 |
| 18–19 Sep | ANN | – | – | – | 45 | 35 | – | 20 |
| 11–12 Sep | Asahi Shimbun | – | – | – | 19 | 36 | 36 | 9 |
| 10–12 Sep | NHK | – | – | – | 22 | 26 | 47 | 5 |
| 7–8 Aug | Asahi Shimbun | – | – | – | 15 | 37 | 34 | 14 |

== Seat projections ==
=== 2021 ===
Seat projections from analysts (district seats + proportional representation)
| Analysts | Publication/ Newspapers | Fieldwork date | LDP | CDP | Kōmeitō | JCP | Ishin | DPFP | SDP | Reiwa | N-Koku | Ind./ Oth. | Majority |
|---|---|---|---|---|---|---|---|---|---|---|---|---|---|
| Election results | | 31 Oct | 259 (187+72) | 96 (57+39) | 32 (9+23) | 10 (1+9) | 41 (16+25) | 11 (6+5) | 1 (1+0) | 3 (0+3) | 0 (0+0) | 12 (12+0) | 26 |
| Kaoru Matsuda | Iza News | 29 Oct | 239 | 130 | 31 | 16 | 32 | 7 | 1 | 1 | 0 | 8 | 6 |
| FNN-Sankei | —N/a | 23–24 Oct | 237 | 136 | 26 | 17 | 30 | 6 | 2 | 1 | 0 | 10 | 4 |
| Asahi Shimbun | —N/a | 23–24 Oct | 251–279 | 94–120 | 25–37 | 9–21 | 25–36 | 5–12 | 2 | 3 | – | 4–9 | 18–46 |
| Kōichi Kakutani | Shukan Asahi | 19 Oct | 243 (176+67) | 137 (79+58) | 29 (8+21) | 19 (2+17) | 19 (11+8) | 8 (5+3) | 1 (1+0) | 1 (0+1) | – | 7 | 10 |
| Tadaoki Nogami | Shukan Asahi | 19 Oct | 239 (171+68) | 137 (85+52) | 29 (9+20) | 18 (1+17) | 23 (10+13) | 10 (5+5) | 1 (1+0) | 1 (0+1) | – | 7 | 6 |
| Takuma Ohamazaki | —N/a | 18 Oct | 236 (166+70) | 133 (85+48) | 29 (8+21) | 17 (1+16) | 30 (13+17) | 9 (5+4) | 1 (1+0) | – | – | 10 | 3 |
| Hiroshi Miura | Sports Hochi | 18 Oct | 261 (192+69) | 109 (61+48) | 32 (9+23) | 14 (1+13) | 25 (10+15) | 12 (5+7) | 1 (1+0) | 1 (0+1) | – | 10 | 28 |
| Koichi Kakutani | Nikkan Sports | 18 Oct | 243 (176+67) | 137 (79+58) | 29 (8+21) | 19 (2+17) | 19 (11+8) | 8 (5+3) | 2 (1+1) | 1 (0+1) | – | 7 | 10 |
| Kaoru Matsuda | Yukan Fuji | 14 Oct | 244 (175+69) | 128 (82+46) | 29 (8+21) | 17 (1+16) | 27 (10+17) | 10 (5+5) | 1 (1+0) | 1 (0+1) | – | 7 | 11 |
| Masashi Kubota | Shukan Bunshun | 14 Oct | 244 (171+73) | 115 (81+34) | 33 (8+25) | 17 (1+16) | 26 (11+15) | 12 (7+5) | 2 (1+1) | 5 (0+5) | – | – | 11 |
| Tadaoki Nogami | Shukan Post | 12 Oct | 239 (171+68) | 136 (84+52) | 28 (8+20) | 18 (1+17) | 22 (9+13) | 10 (5+5) | 1 (1+0) | 1 (0+1) | – | 10 | 6 |
| Hiroshi Miura | Sunday Mainichi | 12 Oct | 257 (191+66) | 113 (64+49) | 32 (9+23) | 14 (1+13) | 25 (10+15) | 14 (5+9) | 1 (1+0) | 1 (0+1) | – | – | 24 |
| Seats before | | | 276 (210+66) | 110 (48+62) | 29 (8+21) | 12 (1+11) | 10 (3+7) | 8 (6+2) | 1 (1+0) | 1 (0+1) | 1 (1+0) | 9 (9+0) | 43 |

== Preferred prime minister ==
Note: Polls phrase this question as "Who should be leader of the LDP for the next term?" or "Who should be Prime Minister for the next term?", including Opposition Leader Yukio Edano only in the latter case. Because of this, some polls excluded Shinzō Abe (even while he was the incumbent), as he had already been elected as LDP leader three times, the maximum presently allowed under party rules.

=== 2021 ===
| Fieldwork date | Polling firm | LDP | | | | | | | | CDP | Others (Note: Including Toshimitsu Motegi; Katsunobu Katō; Hakubun Shimomura; Yasutoshi Nishimura; and unspecified "Others") | NOT/ UD/NA |
| Fieldwork date | Polling firm | Yoshihide Suga | Shinzo Abe | Shigeru Ishiba | Fumio Kishida | Taro Kono | Shinjirō Koizumi | Seiko Noda | Sanae Takaichi | Yukio Edano | Others | NOT/ UD/NA |
|---|---|---|---|---|---|---|---|---|---|---|---|---|
| 19–20 Oct | Asahi Shimbun | | | | 54 | | | | | 14 | 32 | |
| 4 Oct | Fumio Kishida assumes office as the Prime Minister and President of the LDP. | | | | | | | | | | | |
| 23–25 Sep | Nikkei | | | | 17 | 46 | | 5 | 14 | | | 18 |
| 18–19 Sep | ANN | | | | 18 | 48 | | 7 | 10 | | | 17 |
| 18–19 Sep | FNN-Sankei | | | | 15.2 | 52.6 | | 6.4 | 11.6 | | | 14.2 |
| 18 Sep | Mainichi Shimbun | | | | 13 | 43 | | 6 | 15 | | | 23 |
| 17–18 Sep | Kyodo News | | | | 18.5 | 48.6 | | 3.3 | 15.7 | | | |
| 10–13 Sep | Jiji Press | | | | 14.3 | 31.6 | | 7.2 | 0.9 | | | |
| 11–12 Sep | Asahi Shimbun | | | 16 | 14 | 33 | | 3 | 8 | | 26 | |
| 9-11 Sep | Nikkei | | 6 | 17 | 14 | 27 | 10 | 2 | 7 | | 1 | 16 |
| 4–5 Sep | Kyodo | | | 26.6 | 18.8 | 31.9 | | 4.4 | 4.0 | | 1.8 | |
| 4–5 Sep | Yomiuri Shimbun | | 5 | 21 | 12 | 23 | 11 | 2 | 3 | | 2 | 22 |
| 3 Sep | Yoshihide Suga announces he will not seek re-election as President of the LDP. | | | | | | | | | | | |
| 27–29 Aug | Nikkei & TV Tokyo | 11 | 7 | 16 | 13 | 16 | 9 | 2 | 3 | | 2 | 22 |
| 26 Aug | The dates for the LDP leadership election are formally set. | | | | | | | | | | | |
| 21–22 Aug | FNN-Sankei | 2.5 | 8.6 | 15.5 | 3.5 | 17.9 | 11.4 | 1.1 | 1.5 | 4.3 | 1.8 | 32 |
| 21–22 Aug | ANN | 8 | 8 | 19 | 5 | 15 | 11 | 2 | 3 | | 3 | 26 |
| 7–9 Aug | Yomiuri-NNN | 3 | 10 | 19 | 4 | 18 | 17 | 2 | | | 2 | 24 |
| 7–8 Aug | JNN | 5 | 10 | 20 | 4 | 17 | 12 | 3 | | | 4 | 25 |
| 23–25 Jul | Nikkei | 5 | 6 | 19 | 4 | 19 | 12 | 2 | | 4 | 3 | 26 |
| 17–18 Jul | ANN | 9 | 8 | 20 | 3 | 15 | 8 | 2 | | | 3 | 32 |
| 17–18 Jul | FNN-Sankei | 9.1 | 8.7 | 16 | 3.2 | 18.1 | 8.5 | 0.8 | | 5.5 | 1.4 | 28.4 |
| 9-11 Jul | Yomiuri-NNN | 4 | 11 | 18 | 4 | 20 | 15 | 2 | | | 4 | 22 |
| 3–4 Jul | JNN | 8 | 12 | 16 | 3 | 18 | 12 | 2 | | | 2 | 27 |
| 25–27 Jun | Nikkei | 6 | 9 | 13 | 3 | 23 | 13 | 2 | | 6 | 3 | 22 |
| 19–20 Jun | FNN-Sankei | 10.7 | 8.5 | 16.4 | 2.9 | 19.2 | 8.7 | 1.4 | | 4.4 | 1.7 | 19 |
| 5–6 Jun | JNN | 7 | 12 | 17 | 5 | 19 | 12 | 2 | | | 2 | 24 |
| 28–30 May | Nikkei | 6 | 9 | 14 | 3 | 23 | 11 | 1 | | 6 | 4 | 22 |
| 8–9 May | JNN | 8 | 11 | 16 | 4 | 22 | 12 | 2 | | | 3 | 22 |
| 7–9 May | Yomiuri-NNN | 4 | 11 | 19 | 2 | 23 | 13 | 2 | | | 3 | 22 |
| 23–25 Apr | Nikkei | 4 | 8 | 16 | 5 | 24 | 14 | 2 | | 3 | 3 | 20 |
| 17–18 Apr | ANN | 9 | 7 | 17 | 4 | 20 | 11 | 2 | | | 4 | 26 |
| 3–4 Apr | JNN | 9 | | 20 | 5 | 23 | 15 | 3 | | | 3 | 21 |
| 20–21 Mar | ANN | 9 | 7 | 18 | 3 | 21 | 11 | 2 | | | 3 | 26 |
| 6–7 Mar | JNN | 7 | | 19 | 5 | 28 | 12 | | | | 4 | 22 |
| 5–7 Mar | Yomiuri-NNN | 3 | 9 | 19 | 4 | 26 | 17 | 3 | | | 3 | 18 |
| 20–21 Feb | FNN-Sankei | 4.6 | 6.4 | 16.1 | 3.9 | 22.4 | 13.2 | 1.8 | | 3.8 | 2.4 | 25.6 |
| 13–14 Feb | ANN | 8 | 6 | 17 | 4 | 22 | 13 | 3 | | | 2 | 25 |
| 6–7 Feb | JNN | 8 | | 21 | 4 | 22 | 13 | 3 | | | 3 | 25 |
| 29–31 Jan | Nikkei | 6 | 7 | 16 | 3 | 25 | 13 | 2 | | 5 | 2 | 19 |
| 9–10 Jan | JNN | 9 | | 26 | 4 | 20 | 15 | 2 | | | 2 | 22 |

=== 2020 ===
| Fieldwork date | Polling firm | LDP | | | | | | CDP | Others (Note: Including Sanae Takaichi; Seiko Noda; Toshimitsu Motegi; Katsunobu Katō; Hakubun Shimomura; Yasutoshi Nishimura; and unspecified "Others") | NOT/ UD/NA |
| Fieldwork date | Polling firm | Yoshihide Suga | Shinzō Abe | Shigeru Ishiba | Fumio Kishida | Tarō Kōno | Shinjirō Koizumi | Yukio Edano | Others | NOT/ UD/NA |
|---|---|---|---|---|---|---|---|---|---|---|
| 5–6 Dec | JNN | 14 | | 23 | 6 | 17 | 15 | | 6 | 19 |
| 7–8 Nov | JNN | 16 | | 20 | 6 | 18 | 14 | | 6 | 21 |
| 3–4 Oct | JNN | 20 | | 20 | 7 | 19 | 12 | | 4 | 18 |
| 16 Sep | Yoshihide Suga assumes office as the Prime Minister and President of the LDP. | | | | | | | | | |
| 5–6 Sep | JNN | 48 | | 27 | 6 | | | | 0 | 16 |
| 29–30 Aug | Nikkei | 11 | | 28 | 6 | 15 | 14 | 3 | 0 | 21 |
| 28 Aug | Shinzo Abe announces his intention to resign as Prime Minister and President of the LDP. | | | | | | | | | |
| 22–23 Aug | ANN | 4 | 11 | 27 | 4 | 9 | 15 | | 2 | 28 |
| 15–16 Aug | go2senkyo | 5.4 | 14.6 | 26.2 | 3.8 | 13.0 | 10.0 | 4.5 | 22.5 | |
| 1–2 Aug | JNN | 4 | 12 | 28 | 4 | 10 | 14 | | 3 | 27 |
| 18–19 Jul | ANN | 3 | 13 | 29 | 4 | 7 | 13 | | 3 | 28 |
| 17–19 Jul | Nikkei | 4 | 12 | 26 | 5 | 9 | 15 | 5 | 3 | 21 |
| 4–5 Jul | JNN | 4 | 14 | 33 | 5 | 10 | 12 | | 2 | 21 |
| 20–21 Jun | ANN | 4 | 12 | 29 | 4 | 7 | 14 | | 3 | 27 |
| 13–14 Jun | go2senkyo | 3.7 | 18.4 | 29.6 | 4 | 5.8 | 9.4 | 6 | 23 | |
| 6–7 Jun | JNN | 4 | 13 | 28 | 5 | 8 | 15 | | 3 | 26 |
| 5–7 Jun | Nikkei | 3 | 14 | 23 | 4 | 8 | 15 | 6 | 2 | 24 |
| 23–24 May | Asahi | 3 | | 31 | 4 | 9 | 15 | | 7 (Note: "Don't know" and "No answer" combined) | 31 |
| 16–17 May | ANN | 3 | 11 | 25 | 4 | 7 | 14 | | 5 | 31 |
| 9–10 May | JNN | 5 | 17 | 23 | 6 | 7 | 14 | | 3 | 25 |
| 8–10 May | Kyodo | 1.5 | 15.5 | 12.7 | 2.6 | 4.4 | 8.4 | 3.4 | 2.2 | 49.3 |
| 10–13 Apr | Kyodo | 3.1 | 16.8 | 18 | 2.5 | 3.8 | 7.2 | 4.1 | 1.9 | 42.6 |
| 4 Mar – 13 Apr | Asahi | 6 | | 24 | 6 | 7 | 13 | 6 | 0 | 38 |
| 10–13 Apr | Kyodo | 1.1 | 17.8 | 20.9 | 3.8 | 4.1 | 10.6 | 4 | 2.7 | 35 |
| 4–5 Apr | JNN | 4 | 14 | 25 | 5 | 7 | 16 | | 4 | 25 |
| 27–29 Mar | Nikkei | 4 | 16 | 22 | 4 | 7 | 13 | 6 | 1 | 26 |
| 21–22 Mar | ANN | 4 | 16 | 28 | 6 | 6 | 11 | | 3 | 26 |
| 7–8 Mar | JNN | 4 | 15 | 28 | 6 | 6 | 15 | | 2 | 25 |
| 15–16 Feb | Asahi | 5 | | 25 | 6 | 8 | 14 | | 10 | 32 |
| 15–16 Feb | Kyodo | 2.1 | 13.4 | 22.6 | 3.9 | 5.4 | 12 | 5.7 | 3.9 | 31 |
| 1–2 Feb | JNN | 6 | 16 | 24 | 6 | 8 | 14 | | 3 | 24 |
| 18–19 Jan | Mainichi | | 22 | 19 | 2 | | 19 | | 0 | 0 |
| 11–12 Jan | Kyodo | 4.5 | 13.1 | 18.2 | 3.5 | 6.9 | 11.8 | 4.6 | 1.1 | 36.3 |
| 11–12 Jan | JNN | 5 | 17 | 25 | 5 | 9 | 16 | | 3 | 22 |

== Cabinet approval/disapproval ratings ==
=== 2021 ===
| Fieldwork date | Polling firm | Prime Minister | Approve | Disapprove | Und. / no answer |
|---|---|---|---|---|---|
| 23–24 Oct | go2senkyo | Fumio Kishida | 38.8 | 31.2 | 30 |
| 16–17 Oct | go2senkyo | Fumio Kishida | 38.5 | 27.0 | 34.5 |
| 16–17 Oct | Kyodo News | Fumio Kishida | 55.9 | 32.8 | 11.3 |
| 16–17 Oct | ANN | Fumio Kishida | 43.4 | 28.3 | 28.3 |
| 15–17 Oct | NHK | Fumio Kishida | 45.6 | 27.9 | 26.5 |
| 9–10 Oct | Green Ship | Fumio Kishida | 43.2 | 32.4 | 24.4 |
| 9–10 Oct | FNN-Sankei | Fumio Kishida | 63.2 | 27.4 | 9.3 |
| 9–10 Oct | JNN | Fumio Kishida | 58.6 | 34.8 | 6.6 |
| 8–10 Oct | NHK | Fumio Kishida | 49.1 | 24.3 | 26.5 |
| 4–5 Oct | Asahi Shimbun | Fumio Kishida | 45 | 20 | 35 |
| 4–5 Oct | Yomiuri Shimbun | Fumio Kishida | 56 | 27 | 18 |
| 4–5 Oct | Mainichi Shimbun | Fumio Kishida | 49 | 40 | 11 |
| 4–5 Oct | Kyodo News | Fumio Kishida | 55.7 | 23.7 | 20.6 |
| 4–5 Oct | Nikkei-TV Tokyo | Fumio Kishida | 59 | 25 | 16 |
| 4 Oct | Fumio Kishida assumes office as the Prime Minister and President of the LDP. | | | | |
| 23–25 Sep | Nikkei | Yoshihide Suga | 38 | 51 | 11 |
| 18–19 Sep | ANN | Yoshihide Suga | 29.4 | 49.6 | 21.0 |
| 18–19 Sep | FNN-Sankei | Yoshihide Suga | 42.3 | 52.2 | 5.5 |
| 18 Sep | Mainichi Shimbun | Yoshihide Suga | 37 | 55 | 8 |
| 10–13 Sep | Jiji Press | Yoshihide Suga | 33.4 | 47.5 | 19.1 |
| 11–12 Sep | Asahi Shimbun | Yoshihide Suga | 30 | 51 | 19 |
| 10–12 Sep | NHK | Yoshihide Suga | 30 | 50 | 20 |
| 9-11 Sep | Nikkei | Yoshihide Suga | 36 | 56 | 8 |
| 4–5 Sep | Green Ship | Yoshihide Suga | 34.6 | 54.1 | 11.3 |
| 4–5 Sep | Yomiuri Shimbun | Yoshihide Suga | 31 | 57 | 12 |
| 3 Sep | Yoshihide Suga announces he will not seek re-election as President of the LDP. | | | | |
| 28 Aug | Mainichi Shimbun | Yoshihide Suga | 26 | 66 | 8 |
| 27–29 Aug | Nikkei & TV Tokyo | Yoshihide Suga | 34 | 56 | 10 |
| 21–22 Aug | FNN-Sankei | Yoshihide Suga | 32.1 | 61.3 | 6.6 |
| 21–22 Aug | ANN | Yoshihide Suga | 25.8 | 48.7 | 25.5 |
| 14–16 Aug | Kyodo News | Yoshihide Suga | 31.8 | 50.6 | 17.6 |
| 14–15 Aug | go2senkyo | Yoshihide Suga | 26.3 | 49.9 | 23.9 |
| 7–9 Aug | Yomiuri-NNN | Yoshihide Suga | 35 | 54 | 10 |
| 7–9 Aug | NHK | Yoshihide Suga | 28.8 | 51.5 | 19.7 |
| 6–9 Aug | Jiji Press | Yoshihide Suga | 29.0 | 48.3 | 22.7 |
| 7–8 Aug | Asahi Shimbun | Yoshihide Suga | 28 | 53 | 19 |
| 7–8 Aug | JNN | Yoshihide Suga | 32.6 | 63.4 | 4.0 |
| 23–25 Jul | Nikkei | Yoshihide Suga | 34 | 57 | 9 |
| 17–18 Jul | Kyodo News | Yoshihide Suga | 35.9 | 49.8 | 14.3 |
| 17–18 Jul | ANN | Yoshihide Suga | 29.6 | 46.1 | 24.3 |
| 17–18 Jul | Asahi Shimbun | Yoshihide Suga | 31 | 49 | 20 |
| 17–18 Jul | FNN-Sankei | Yoshihide Suga | 39.0 | 55.5 | 5.5 |
| 17 Jul | Mainichi Shimbun | Yoshihide Suga | 30 | 62 | 9 |
| 9–12 Jul | Jiji Press | Yoshihide Suga | 29.3 | 49.8 | 20.9 |
| 10–11 Jul | go2senkyo | Yoshihide Suga | 27.9 | 46.6 | 25.4 |
| 9-11 Jul | Yomiuri-NNN | Yoshihide Suga | 37 | 53 | 10 |
| 9-11 Jul | NHK | Yoshihide Suga | 33.3 | 46.0 | 20.8 |
| 3–4 Jul | JNN | Yoshihide Suga | 42.7 | 54.2 | 3.0 |
| 25–27 Jun | Nikkei | Yoshihide Suga | 43 | 50 | 7 |
| 19–20 Jun | Kyodo News | Yoshihide Suga | 44.0 | 42.2 | 13.8 |
| 19–20 Jun | ANN | Yoshihide Suga | 32.4 | 42.7 | 24.9 |
| 19–20 Jun | FNN-Sankei | Yoshihide Suga | 43.4 | 51.6 | 5 |
| 19–20 Jun | Asahi Shimbun | Yoshihide Suga | 34 | 42 | 24 |
| 19 Jun | Mainichi Shimbun | Yoshihide Suga | 34 | 55 | 11 |
| 11–14 Jun | Jiji Press | Yoshihide Suga | 33.1 | 44.2 | 22.7 |
| 12–13 Jun | go2senkyo | Yoshihide Suga | 28.9 | 45.7 | 25.4 |
| 11–13 Jun | NHK | Yoshihide Suga | 36.7 | 44.8 | 18.5 |
| 5–6 Jun | JNN | Yoshihide Suga | 38.9 | 58.4 | 2.7 |
| 4–6 Jun | Yomiuri-NNN | Yoshihide Suga | 37 | 50 | 13 |
| 28–30 May | Nikkei | Yoshihide Suga | 40 | 50 | 10 |
| 22 May | Mainichi Shimbun | Yoshihide Suga | 31 | 59 | 10 |
| 15–16 May | FNN-Sankei | Yoshihide Suga | 43 | 52.8 | 4.2 |
| 15–16 May | ANN | Yoshihide Suga | 35.6 | 45.9 | 18.5 |
| 15–16 May | Asahi Shimbun | Yoshihide Suga | 33 | 47 | 20 |
| 15–16 May | Kyodo News | Yoshihide Suga | 41.1 | 47.3 | 11.6 |
| 7–10 May | Jiji Press | Yoshihide Suga | 32.2 | 44.6 | 23.2 |
| 8–9 May | JNN | Yoshihide Suga | 40 | 57 | 3 |
| 7–9 May | Yomiuri-NNN | Yoshihide Suga | 43 | 46 | 11 |
| 7–9 May | NHK | Yoshihide Suga | 35 | 43 | 22 |
| 23–25 Apr | Nikkei | Yoshihide Suga | 47 | 44 | 9 |
| 18 Apr | Mainichi Shimbun | Yoshihide Suga | 40 | 51 | 9 |
| 17–18 Apr | FNN-Sankei | Yoshihide Suga | 41.9 | 52.3 | 5.8 |
| 17–18 Apr | ANN | Yoshihide Suga | 36.2 | 37.4 | 26.4 |
| 9–12 Apr | Jiji Press | Yoshihide Suga | 36.6 | 37.7 | 25.7 |
| 3 Mar – 12 Apr | Asahi Shimbun | Yoshihide Suga | 42 | 48 | 10 |
| 10–11 Apr | Asahi Shimbun | Yoshihide Suga | 40 | 39 | 21 |
| 9-11 Apr | NHK | Yoshihide Suga | 43.9 | 38 | 18.1 |
| 3–4 Apr | JNN | Yoshihide Suga | 44.4 | 52.7 | 3.0 |
| 2–4 Apr | Yomiuri-NNN | Yoshihide Suga | 47 | 40 | 13 |
| 26–28 Mar | Nikkei | Yoshihide Suga | 45 | 46 | 9 |
| 20–21 Mar | Asahi Shimbun | Yoshihide Suga | 40 | 39 | 21 |
| 20–21 Mar | Kyodo News | Yoshihide Suga | 42.1 | 41.5 | 16.4 |
| 20–21 Mar | ANN | Yoshihide Suga | 36.6 | 38.7 | 24.7 |
| 13–14 Mar | FNN-Sankei | Yoshihide Suga | 51.4 | 42.8 | 5.8 |
| 5–8 Mar | Jiji Press | Yoshihide Suga | 35 | 41 | 24 |
| 6–7 Mar | JNN | Yoshihide Suga | 42.7 | 53.2 | 4.2 |
| 5–7 Mar | NHK | Yoshihide Suga | 40.3 | 36.5 | 23.2 |
| 5–7 Mar | Yomiuri-NNN | Yoshihide Suga | 48 | 42 | 10 |
| 26–28 Feb | Nikkei | Yoshihide Suga | 44 | 48 | 8 |
| 20–21 Feb | FNN-Sankei | Yoshihide Suga | 51.5 | 43.2 | 5.3 |
| 14 Feb | Mainichi Shimbun | Yoshihide Suga | 38 | 51 | 11 |
| 13–14 Feb | Asahi Shimbun | Yoshihide Suga | 34 | 43 | 23 |
| 13–14 Feb | ANN | Yoshihide Suga | 36.2 | 41 | 22.8 |
| 6–7 Feb | JNN | Yoshihide Suga | 40.8 | 55.9 | 3.3 |
| 5–7 Feb | NHK | Yoshihide Suga | 37.6 | 43.6 | 18.8 |
| 5–7 Feb | Yomiuri-NNN | Yoshihide Suga | 39 | 44 | 17 |
| 4–7 Feb | Jiji Press | Yoshihide Suga | 34.8 | 42.8 | 22.4 |
| 29–31 Jan | Nikkei | Yoshihide Suga | 43 | 50 | 7 |
| 23–24 Jan | Asahi Shimbun | Yoshihide Suga | 33 | 45 | 22 |
| 23–24 Jan | FNN-Sankei | Yoshihide Suga | 52.3 | 45 | 2.7 |
| 17 Jan | Mainichi Shimbun | Yoshihide Suga | 33 | 57 | 10 |
| 16–17 Jan | ANN | Yoshihide Suga | 34.8 | 42.5 | 22.7 |
| 15–17 Jan | Yomiuri-NNN | Yoshihide Suga | 39 | 49 | 12 |
| 9-11 Jan | NHK | Yoshihide Suga | 39.5 | 40.7 | 19.8 |
| 8–11 Jan | Jiji Press | Yoshihide Suga | 34.2 | 39.7 | 26.1 |
| 9–10 Jan | Kyodo News | Yoshihide Suga | 41.3 | 42.8 | 15.9 |
| 9–10 Jan | JNN | Yoshihide Suga | 41 | 55.9 | 3.1 |

=== 2020 ===
| Fieldwork date | Polling firm | Prime Minister | Approve | Disapprove | Und. / no answer |
|---|---|---|---|---|---|
| 26–27 Dec | Yomiuri-NNN | Yoshihide Suga | 45 | 43 | 12 |
| 25–27 Dec | Nikkei | Yoshihide Suga | 42 | 48 | 10 |
| 19–20 Dec | Asahi Shimbun | Yoshihide Suga | 39 | 35 | 26 |
| 19–20 Dec | ANN | Yoshihide Suga | 38.4 | 39.6 | 22 |
| 13 Dec | Mainichi Shimbun | Yoshihide Suga | 40 | 49 | 11 |
| 11–13 Dec | NHK | Yoshihide Suga | 42.4 | 36 | 21.6 |
| 4–7 Dec | Jiji Press | Yoshihide Suga | 43.1 | 26.6 | 30.3 |
| 5–6 Dec | JNN | Yoshihide Suga | 55.2 | 41.1 | 3.7 |
| 5–6 Dec | Kyodo News | Yoshihide Suga | 50.3 | 32.8 | 16.9 |
| 4–6 Dec | Yomiuri-NNN | Yoshihide Suga | 61 | 27 | 12 |
| 27–29 Nov | Nikkei | Yoshihide Suga | 58 | 32 | 10 |
| 15 Oct – 17 Nov | Yomiuri-Waseda | Yoshihide Suga | 66 | 20 | 14 |
| 14–15 Nov | Asahi Shimbun | Yoshihide Suga | 56 | 20 | 24 |
| 14–15 Nov | ANN | Yoshihide Suga | 55.9 | 22.5 | 21.6 |
| 6–9 Nov | Jiji Press | Yoshihide Suga | 48.3 | 19.6 | 32.1 |
| 8 Nov | Mainichi Shimbun | Yoshihide Suga | 57 | 36 | 7 |
| 7–8 Nov | JNN | Yoshihide Suga | 66.9 | 28.3 | 4.9 |
| 6–8 Nov | NHK | Yoshihide Suga | 55.6 | 19 | 25.4 |
| 6–8 Nov | Yomiuri-NNN | Yoshihide Suga | 69 | 22 | 9 |
| 23–25 Oct | Nikkei | Yoshihide Suga | 63 | 26 | 11 |
| 17–18 Oct | Asahi Shimbun | Yoshihide Suga | 53 | 22 | 25 |
| 17–18 Oct | ANN | Yoshihide Suga | 56.1 | 19.8 | 24.1 |
| 16–18 Oct | Yomiuri-NNN | Yoshihide Suga | 67 | 21 | 12 |
| 9–12 Oct | Jiji Press | Yoshihide Suga | 51.2 | 15.6 | 33.2 |
| 9-11 Oct | NHK | Yoshihide Suga | 55.1 | 19.5 | 25.4 |
| 3–4 Oct | JNN | Yoshihide Suga | 70.7 | 24.2 | 5.1 |
| 21–22 Sep | NHK | Yoshihide Suga | 62.4 | 12.8 | 24.7 |
| 19–20 Sep | Yomiuri-NNN | Yoshihide Suga | 74 | 14 | 12 |
| 19–20 Sep | ANN | Yoshihide Suga | 62.3 | 16.3 | 21.4 |
| 16–17 Sep | Nikkei | Yoshihide Suga | 74 | 17 | 9 |
| 16–17 Sep | Asahi Shimbun | Yoshihide Suga | 65 | 13 | 22 |
| 16 Sep | Yoshihide Suga assumes office as the Prime Minister and President of the LDP.. | | | | |
| 28 Aug | Shinzo Abe announces his intention to resign as Prime Minister and President of the LDP. | | | | |
| 1–2 Aug | JNN | Shinzo Abe | 35.5 | 62.2 | 2.4 |
| 18–19 Jul | ANN | Shinzo Abe | 34.4 | 48.3 | 17.3 |
| 18–19 Jul | Asahi Shimbun | Shinzo Abe | 33 | 50 | 17 |
| 17–19 Jul | Nikkei & TV Tokyo | Shinzo Abe | 43 | 50 | 7 |
| 17–19 Jul | Kyodo News | Shinzo Abe | 38.8 | 48.5 | 12.7 |
| 18–19 Jul | Mainichi & SSRC | Shinzo Abe | 32 | 60 | 8 |
| 10–13 Jul | Jiji Press | Shinzo Abe | 35.1 | 46.2 | 18.7 |
| 11–12 Jul | go2senkyo & JX | Shinzo Abe | 26.3 | 48.2 | 25.5 |
| 4–5 Jul | JNN | Shinzo Abe | 38.2 | 59.8 | 2 |
| 3–5 Jul | Yomiuri Shimbun | Shinzo Abe | 39 | 52 | 9 |
| 11–22 Jun | Jiji Press | Shinzo Abe | 40.3 | 59.1 | 0.6 |
| 20–21 Jun | ANN | Shinzo Abe | 33.7 | 49.6 | 16.7 |
| 20–21 Jun | Kyodo News | Shinzo Abe | 36.7 | 49.7 | 13.6 |
| 20–21 Jun | Asahi Shimbun | Shinzo Abe | 31 | 52 | 17 |
| 20–20 Jun | Mainichi & SSRC | Shinzo Abe | 36 | 56 | 8 |
| 13–14 Jun | go2senkyo & JX | Shinzo Abe | 25 | 51.2 | 23.8 |
| 6–7 Jun | JNN | Shinzo Abe | 39.1 | 59.2 | 1.7 |
| 5–7 Jun | Nikkei & TV Tokyo | Shinzo Abe | 38 | 51 | 11 |
| 5–7 Jun | Yomiuri Shimbun | Shinzo Abe | 40 | 50 | 10 |
| 21 May – 1 Jun | Jiji Press | Shinzo Abe | 38.1 | 61.3 | 0.6 |
| 29–31 May | Kyodo News | Shinzo Abe | 39.4 | 45.4 | 15.2 |
| 23–24 May | Asahi Shimbun | Shinzo Abe | 29 | 52 | 19 |
| 23–24 May | Mainichi & SSRC | Shinzo Abe | 27 | 64 | 9 |
| 16–17 May | go2senkyo & JX | Shinzo Abe | 24.9 | 48.8 | 26.3 |
| 16–17 May | ANN | Shinzo Abe | 32.8 | 48.5 | 18.7 |
| 9–10 May | JNN | Shinzo Abe | 47.3 | 50.8 | 1.9 |
| 8–10 May | Nikkei & TV Tokyo | Shinzo Abe | 49 | 42 | 9 |
| 8–10 May | Kyodo News | Shinzo Abe | 41.7 | 43 | 15.3 |
| 8–10 May | Yomiuri Shimbun | Shinzo Abe | 42 | 48 | 10 |
| 18–19 Apr | Asahi Shimbun | Shinzo Abe | 41 | 41 | 18 |
| 18–19 Apr | Mainichi Shimbun | Shinzo Abe | 41 | 42 | 17 |
| 10–13 Apr | Kyodo News | Shinzo Abe | 40.4 | 43 | 16.6 |
| 4 Mar – 13 Apr | Asahi Shimbun | Shinzo Abe | 42 | 48 | 10 |
| 11–12 Apr | go2senkyo & JX | Shinzo Abe | 26.9 | 46.5 | 26.6 |
| 11–12 Apr | Yomiuri Shimbun | Shinzo Abe | 42 | 47 | 11 |
| 10–12 Apr | NHK | Shinzo Abe | 39 | 37.9 | 23.1 |
| 8–9 Apr | Mainichi, JNN, & SSRC | Shinzo Abe | 44 | 42 | 14 |
| 4–5 Apr | JNN | Shinzo Abe | 43.3 | 52.7 | 4 |
| 27–29 Mar | Nikkei & TV Tokyo | Shinzo Abe | 48 | 42 | 10 |
| 26–28 Mar | Kyodo News | Shinzo Abe | 45.5 | 38.8 | 15.7 |
| 21–22 Mar | ANN | Shinzo Abe | 39.8 | 38.6 | 21.6 |
| 20–22 Mar | Yomiuri Shimbun | Shinzo Abe | 48 | 40 | 12 |
| 14–16 Mar | Kyodo News | Shinzo Abe | 49.7 | 38.1 | 12.8 |
| 14–15 Mar | Asahi Shimbun | Shinzo Abe | 41 | 38 | 21 |
| 14–15 Mar | Mainichi Shimbun | Shinzo Abe | 43 | 38 | 19 |
| 6–9 Mar | Jiji Press | Shinzo Abe | 39.3 | 38.8 | 21.9 |
| 7–8 Mar | JNN | Shinzo Abe | 48.7 | 47.5 | 3.8 |
| 6–8 Mar | NHK | Shinzo Abe | 42.7 | 40.6 | 16.7 |
| 29 Feb – 1 Mar | go2senkyo & JX | Shinzo Abe | 37.4 | 45.1 | 17.5 |
| 29 Feb – 1 Mar | go2senkyo & JX | Shinzo Abe | 42.2 | 47.9 | 9.9 |
| 21–23 Feb | Nikkei & TV Tokyo | Shinzo Abe | 46 | 47 | 7 |
| 15–16 Feb | go2senkyo & JX | Shinzo Abe | 41.2 | 49.1 | 9.7 |
| 15–16 Feb | Asahi Shimbun | Shinzo Abe | 39 | 40 | 21 |
| 15–16 Feb | ANN | Shinzo Abe | 39.8 | 42.2 | 18 |
| 15–16 Feb | Kyodo News | Shinzo Abe | 41 | 46.1 | 12.9 |
| 14–15 Feb | Yomiuri Shimbun | Shinzo Abe | 47 | 41 | 12 |
| 7–9 Feb | NHK | Shinzo Abe | 44.6 | 37.4 | 18 |
| 6–9 Feb | Jiji Press | Shinzo Abe | 38.6 | 39.8 | 21.6 |
| 1–2 Feb | JNN | Shinzo Abe | 49.8 | 46.8 | 3.4 |
| 25–26 Jan | Asahi Shimbun | Shinzo Abe | 38 | 41 | 21 |
| 24–26 Jan | Nikkei & TV Tokyo | Shinzo Abe | 48 | 45 | 7 |
| 18–19 Jan | ANN | Shinzo Abe | 45.4 | 35.7 | 18.9 |
| 18–19 Jan | Mainichi Shimbun | Shinzo Abe | 41 | 37 | 22 |
| 17–19 Jan | Yomiuri Shimbun | Shinzo Abe | 52 | 37 | 11 |
| 11–13 Jan | NHK | Shinzo Abe | 43.5 | 37.7 | 18.8 |
| 10–13 Jan | Jiji Press | Shinzo Abe | 40.4 | 37 | 22.6 |
| 11–12 Jan | go2senkyo & JX | Shinzo Abe | 43.9 | 43 | 13.1 |
| 11–12 Jan | JNN | Shinzo Abe | 52.1 | 44.8 | 3.1 |
| 11–12 Jan | Kyodo News | Shinzo Abe | 49.3 | 36.7 | 14 |

=== 2019 ===
| Fieldwork date | Polling firm | Prime Minister | Approve | Disapprove | Und. / no answer |
|---|---|---|---|---|---|
| 21–22 Dec | Asahi Shimbun | Shinzo Abe | 38 | 42 | 20 |
| 20–22 Dec | Nikkei & TV Tokyo | Shinzo Abe | 50 | 41 | 9 |
| 14–15 Dec | go2senkyo & JX | Shinzo Abe | 44.03 | 45.12 | 10.86 |
| 14–15 Dec | ANN | Shinzo Abe | 40.9 | 40.6 | 18.5 |
| 14–15 Dec | Kyodo News | Shinzo Abe | 42.7 | 43.0 | 14.3 |
| 13–15 Dec | Yomiuri Shimbun | Shinzo Abe | 48 | 40 | 12 |
| 6–9 Dec | Jiji Press | Shinzo Abe | 40.6 | 35.3 | 24.1 |
| 9 Oct – 9 Dec | Mainichi & SSRC | Shinzo Abe | 44 | 35 | 19 |
| 7–8 Dec | JNN | Shinzo Abe | 49.1 | 47.7 | 3.1 |
| 6–8 Dec | NHK | Shinzo Abe | 44.5 | 36.6 | 18.9 |
| 30 Nov – 1 Dec | Mainichi Shimbun | Shinzo Abe | 42 | 35 | 21 |
| 23–24 Nov | Kyodo News | Shinzo Abe | 48.7 | 38.1 | 13.2 |
| 22–24 Nov | Nikkei & TV Tokyo | Shinzo Abe | 50 | 40 | 9 |
| 16–17 Nov | Asahi Shimbun | Shinzo Abe | 44 | 36 | 20 |
| 15–17 Nov | Yomiuri Shimbun | Shinzo Abe | 49 | 36 | 15 |
| 9–10 Nov | go2senkyo & JX | Shinzo Abe | 42.88 | 33.75 | 23.38 |
| 9–10 Nov | ANN | Shinzo Abe | 44.4 | 34.3 | 21.3 |
| 9–10 Nov | JNN | Shinzo Abe | 54.3 | 42.4 | 3.3 |
| 8–10 Nov | Jiji Press | Shinzo Abe | 48.5 | 29.4 | 22.1 |
| 8–10 Nov | NHK | Shinzo Abe | 47.4 | 34.6 | 18.0 |
| 26–27 Oct | Mainichi Shimbun | Shinzo Abe | 48 | 30 | 19 |
| 26–27 Oct | Kyodo News | Shinzo Abe | 54.1 | 34.5 | 11.4 |
| 25–27 Oct | Nikkei & TV Tokyo | Shinzo Abe | 57 | 36 | 8 |
| 19–20 Oct | Asahi Shimbun | Shinzo Abe | 45 | 32 | 23 |
| 19–20 Oct | ANN | Shinzo Abe | 45.4 | 33.6 | 21.0 |
| 18–20 Oct | Yomiuri Shimbun | Shinzo Abe | 55 | 34 | 11 |
| 11–14 Oct | Jiji Press | Shinzo Abe | 44.2 | 33.0 | 22.8 |
| 5–6 Oct | JNN | Shinzo Abe | 54.9 | 42.4 | 2.7 |
| 5–6 Oct | Kyodo News | Shinzo Abe | 53.0 | 34.2 | 12.8 |
| 14–15 Sep | Asahi Shimbun | Shinzo Abe | 48 | 31 | 21 |
| 14–15 Sep | ANN | Shinzo Abe | 52.0 | 27.9 | 20.1 |
| 14–15 Sep | Mainichi Shimbun | Shinzo Abe | 50 | 28 | 21 |
| 13–15 Sep | Yomiuri Shimbun | Shinzo Abe | 53 | 35 | 11 |
| 11–12 Sep | Nikkei & TV Tokyo | Shinzo Abe | 59 | 33 | 8 |
| 11–12 Sep | Kyodo News | Shinzo Abe | 55.4 | 25.7 | 18.9 |
| 6–9 Sep | Jiji Press | Shinzo Abe | 43.1 | 34.1 | 22.8 |
| 7–8 Sep | JNN | Shinzo Abe | 57.0 | 38.7 | 4.2 |
| 6–8 Sep | NHK | Shinzo Abe | 47.5 | 32.6 | 19.9 |
| 30 Aug – 1 Sep | Nikkei & TV Tokyo | Shinzo Abe | 58 | 33 | 9 |
| 23–25 Aug | Yomiuri Shimbun | Shinzo Abe | 58 | 30 | 12 |
| 17–18 Aug | ANN | Shinzo Abe | 48.1 | 32.4 | 19.5 |
| 17–18 Aug | Kyodo News | Shinzo Abe | 50.3 | 34.6 | 15.1 |
| 9–12 Aug | Jiji Press | Shinzo Abe | 47.0 | 30.8 | 22.2 |
| 3–4 Aug | JNN | Shinzo Abe | 60.1 | 37.0 | 2.8 |
| 2–4 Aug | NHK | Shinzo Abe | 48.5 | 30.8 | 20.7 |
| 26–28 Jul | Nikkei & TV Tokyo | Shinzo Abe | 52 | 38 | 10 |
| 22–23 Jul | Asahi Shimbun | Shinzo Abe | 42 | 35 | 23 |
| 22–23 Jul | Kyodo News | Shinzo Abe | 48.6 | 38.2 | 13.2 |
| 22–23 Jul | Yomiuri Shimbun | Shinzo Abe | 53 | 36 | 11 |
| 21 Jul | House of Councillors election | | | | |
| 13–15 Jul | NHK | Shinzo Abe | 45 | 33 | 22 |
| 13–14 Jul | Asahi Shimbun | Shinzo Abe | 42 | 34 | 24 |
| 5–8 Jul | Jiji Press | Shinzo Abe | 43.1 | 31.0 | 25.9 |
| 6–7 Jul | JNN | Shinzo Abe | 58.7 | 36.9 | 4.4 |
| 5–7 Jul | NHK | Shinzo Abe | 45.4 | 33.2 | 21.5 |
| 4–5 Jul | Yomiuri Shimbun | Shinzo Abe | 51 | 33 | 16 |
| 28–30 Jun | NHK | Shinzo Abe | 45 | 31 | 24 |
| 28–30 Jun | Nikkei & TV Tokyo | Shinzo Abe | 56 | 36 | 8 |
| 28–30 Jun | Yomiuri Shimbun | Shinzo Abe | 53 | 36 | 10 |
| 26–27 Jun | Kyodo News | Shinzo Abe | 47.6 | 44.1 | 8.3 |
| 22–23 Jun | Asahi Shimbun | Shinzo Abe | 45 | 33 | 22 |
| 21–23 Jun | NHK | Shinzo Abe | 42 | 34 | 24 |
| 15–16 Jun | Kyodo News | Shinzo Abe | 47.6 | 38.1 | 14.3 |
| 15–16 Jun | Mainichi Shimbun | Shinzo Abe | 40 | 37 | 21 |
| 7–10 Jun | Jiji Press | Shinzo Abe | 44.9 | 31.5 | 23.6 |
| 7–9 Jun | NHK | Shinzo Abe | 47.9 | 32.0 | 20.0 |
| 1–2 Jun | JNN | Shinzo Abe | 59.1 | 36.9 | 3.9 |
| 18–19 May | ANN | Shinzo Abe | 47.0 | 32.5 | 20.5 |
| 18–19 May | Asahi Shimbun | Shinzo Abe | 45 | 32 | 23 |
| 18–19 May | Kyodo News | Shinzo Abe | 50.5 | 36.2 | 13.3 |
| 18–19 May | Mainichi Shimbun | Shinzo Abe | 43 | 31 | 23 |
| 17–19 May | Yomiuri Shimbun | Shinzo Abe | 55 | 32 | 12 |
| 10–13 May | Jiji Press | Shinzo Abe | 44.7 | 31.1 | 24.2 |
| 11–12 May | JNN | Shinzo Abe | 57.4 | 40.3 | 2.4 |
| 10–12 May | Nikkei & TV Tokyo | Shinzo Abe | 55 | 35 | 10 |
| 10–12 May | NHK | Shinzo Abe | 47.6 | 32.3 | 20.1 |
| 1–2 May | Kyodo News | Shinzo Abe | 51.9 | 31.3 | 16.8 |
| 26–28 Apr | Yomiuri Shimbun | Shinzo Abe | 54 | 31 | 14 |
| 20–21 Apr | ANN | Shinzo Abe | 45.0 | 33.0 | 22.0 |
| 6 Mar – 15 Apr | Asahi Shimbun | Shinzo Abe | 43 | 45 | 12 |
| 13–14 Apr | Asahi Shimbun | Shinzo Abe | 44 | 32 | 24 |
| 13–14 Apr | Mainichi Shimbun | Shinzo Abe | 41 | 37 | 21 |
| 5–8 Apr | Jiji Press | Shinzo Abe | 43.0 | 34.3 | 22.7 |
| 6–7 Apr | JNN | Shinzo Abe | 53.4 | 43.4 | 3.2 |
| 5–7 Apr | NHK | Shinzo Abe | 47.4 | 34.6 | 18.1 |
| 1–2 Apr | Kyodo News | Shinzo Abe | 52.8 | 32.4 | 14.8 |
| 1–2 Apr | Yomiuri Shimbun | Shinzo Abe | 53 | 32 | 14 |
| 22–24 Mar | Nikkei & TV Tokyo | Shinzo Abe | 48 | 42 | 10 |
| 22–24 Mar | Yomiuri Shimbun | Shinzo Abe | 50 | 35 | 15 |
| 16–17 Mar | ANN | Shinzo Abe | 43.2 | 36.1 | 20.7 |
| 16–17 Mar | Asahi Shimbun | Shinzo Abe | 41 | 37 | 22 |
| 16–17 Mar | Mainichi Shimbun | Shinzo Abe | 39 | 41 | 19 |
| 8–11 Mar | Jiji Press | Shinzo Abe | 39.0 | 36.4 | 24.6 |
| 9–10 Mar | Kyodo News | Shinzo Abe | 43.3 | 40.9 | 15.8 |
| 8–10 Mar | NHK | Shinzo Abe | 42.0 | 36.0 | 22.0 |
| 2–3 Mar | JNN | Shinzo Abe | 52.3 | 44.3 | 3.4 |
| 23–24 Feb | ANN | Shinzo Abe | 41.8 | 36.7 | 21.5 |
| 22–24 Feb | Yomiuri Shimbun | Shinzo Abe | 49 | 40 | 11 |
| 16–17 Feb | Asahi Shimbun | Shinzo Abe | 41 | 38 | 21 |
| 15–17 Feb | Nikkei & TV Tokyo | Shinzo Abe | 51 | 42 | 7 |
| 9–11 Feb | NHK | Shinzo Abe | 43.7 | 37.4 | 18.9 |
| 8–11 Feb | Jiji Press | Shinzo Abe | 42.4 | 34.5 | 23.1 |
| 2–3 Feb | JNN | Shinzo Abe | 52.8 | 44.3 | 2.9 |
| 2–3 Feb | Kyodo News | Shinzo Abe | 45.6 | 41.1 | 13.3 |
| 2–3 Feb | Mainichi Shimbun | Shinzo Abe | 38 | 39 | 22 |
| 26–27 Jan | ANN | Shinzo Abe | 41.0 | 37.9 | 21.1 |
| 25–27 Jan | Nikkei & TV Tokyo | Shinzo Abe | 53 | 37 | 10 |
| 25–27 Jan | Yomiuri Shimbun | Shinzo Abe | 49 | 38 | 13 |
| 19–20 Jan | Asahi Shimbun | Shinzo Abe | 43 | 38 | 19 |
| 12–14 Jan | NHK | Shinzo Abe | 42.5 | 35.1 | 22.5 |
| 12–13 Jan | JNN | Shinzo Abe | 50.8 | 45.5 | 3.6 |
| 12–13 Jan | Kyodo News | Shinzo Abe | 43.4 | 42.3 | 14.3 |
| 11–14 Jan | Jiji Press | Shinzo Abe | 43.5 | 35.1 | 21.4 |

=== 2018 ===
| Fieldwork date | Polling firm | Prime Minister | Approve | Disapprove | Und. / no answer |
|---|---|---|---|---|---|
| 13 Nov – 25 Dec | Asahi Shimbun | Shinzo Abe | 46 | 46 | 8 |
| 15–16 Dec | ANN | Shinzo Abe | 40.0 | 40.6 | 19.4 |
| 15–16 Dec | Asahi Shimbun | Shinzo Abe | 40 | 41 | 19 |
| 15–16 Dec | Kyodo News | Shinzo Abe | 42.4 | 44.1 | 13.5 |
| 15–16 Dec | Mainichi Shimbun | Shinzo Abe | 37 | 40 | 21 |
| 14–16 Dec | Nikkei & TV Tokyo | Shinzo Abe | 47 | 44 | 9 |
| 14–16 Dec | Yomiuri Shimbun | Shinzo Abe | 47 | 43 | 10 |
| 7–10 Dec | Jiji Press | Shinzo Abe | 38.9 | 38.7 | 22.4 |
| 17 Oct – 10 Dec | Mainichi & SSRC | Shinzo Abe | 31 | 42 | 24 |
| 8–9 Dec | NHK | Shinzo Abe | 41.3 | 37.8 | 20.9 |
| 1–2 Dec | JNN | Shinzo Abe | 52.8 | 44.3 | 2.9 |
| 24 Oct – 30 Nov | Nikkei | Shinzo Abe | 35 | 33 | 32 |
| 23–25 Nov | Nikkei & TV Tokyo | Shinzo Abe | 51 | 38 | 11 |
| 23–25 Nov | Yomiuri Shimbun | Shinzo Abe | 53 | 36 | 11 |
| 17–18 Nov | ANN | Shinzo Abe | 44.3 | 36.4 | 19.3 |
| 17–18 Nov | Asahi Shimbun | Shinzo Abe | 43 | 34 | 23 |
| 17–18 Nov | Mainichi Shimbun | Shinzo Abe | 41 | 38 | 20 |
| 9–12 Nov | Jiji Press | Shinzo Abe | 42.3 | 38.2 | 19.5 |
| 9–11 Nov | NHK | Shinzo Abe | 45.6 | 36.8 | 17.6 |
| 3–4 Nov | JNN | Shinzo Abe | 51.0 | 47.0 | 2.0 |
| 3–4 Nov | Kyodo News | Shinzo Abe | 47.3 | 39.5 | 13.2 |
| 26–28 Oct | Nikkei & TV Tokyo | Shinzo Abe | 48 | 42 | 9 |
| 26–28 Oct | Yomiuri Shimbun | Shinzo Abe | 49 | 41 | 10 |
| 20–21 Oct | ANN | Shinzo Abe | 39.3 | 40.1 | 20.6 |
| 13–14 Oct | Asahi Shimbun | Shinzo Abe | 40 | 40 | 20 |
| 13–14 Oct | JNN | Shinzo Abe | 51.7 | 45.6 | 2.7 |
| 6–8 Oct | NHK | Shinzo Abe | 42.3 | 39.8 | 17.9 |
| 5–8 Oct | Jiji Press | Shinzo Abe | 41.9 | 36.1 | 22 |
| 6–7 Oct | Mainichi Shimbun | Shinzo Abe | 37 | 40 | 20 |
| 2–3 Oct | Kyodo News | Shinzo Abe | 46.5 | 38.2 | 15.3 |
| 2–3 Oct | Nikkei & TV Tokyo | Shinzo Abe | 50 | 42 | 9 |
| 2–3 Oct | Yomiuri Shimbun | Shinzo Abe | 50 | 39 | 10 |
| 21–23 Sep | Nikkei & TV Tokyo | Shinzo Abe | 55 | 39 | 5 |
| 21–23 Sep | Yomiuri Shimbun | Shinzo Abe | 50 | 41 | 9 |
| 20–21 Sep | Kyodo News | Shinzo Abe | 47.4 | 40.0 | 12.6 |
| 15–17 Sep | NHK | Shinzo Abe | 42.1 | 38.7 | 19.2 |
| 15–16 Sep | ANN | Shinzo Abe | 39.4 | 38.7 | 21.9 |
| 7–10 Sep | Jiji Press | Shinzo Abe | 41.7 | 36.6 | 21.7 |
| 8–9 Sep | Asahi Shimbun | Shinzo Abe | 41 | 38 | 21 |
| 1–2 Sep | JNN | Shinzo Abe | 46.2 | 52.0 | 1.8 |
| 1–2 Sep | Mainichi Shimbun | Shinzo Abe | 37 | 41 | 20 |
| 25–26 Aug | Kyodo News | Shinzo Abe | 40.3 | 44.3 | 15.4 |
| 24–26 Aug | Nikkei & TV Tokyo | Shinzo Abe | 48 | 42 | 10 |
| 24–26 Aug | Yomiuri Shimbun | Shinzo Abe | 50 | 40 | 10 |
| 18–19 Aug | ANN | Shinzo Abe | 38.8 | 44.6 | 16.6 |
| 3–6 Aug | Jiji Press | Shinzo Abe | 38.5 | 38.9 | 22.6 |
| 4–5 Aug | Asahi Shimbun | Shinzo Abe | 38 | 41 | 21 |
| 4–5 Aug | JNN | Shinzo Abe | 43.8 | 54.0 | 2.3 |
| 3–5 Aug | NHK | Shinzo Abe | 41.4 | 40.6 | 18.0 |
| 28–29 Jul | Mainchi Shimbun | Shinzo Abe | 37 | 44 | 18 |
| 21–22 Jul | ANN | Shinzo Abe | 38.2 | 45.6 | 16.2 |
| 21–22 Jul | Kyodo News | Shinzo Abe | 43.4 | 41.8 | 14.8 |
| 21–22 Jul | Yomiuri Shimbun | Shinzo Abe | 45 | 45 | 10 |
| 20–22 Jul | Nikkei & TV Tokyo | Shinzo Abe | 45 | 47 | 8 |
| 14–15 Jul | Asahi Shimbun | Shinzo Abe | 38 | 43 | 19 |
| 6–9 Jul | Jiji Press | Shinzo Abe | 37.0 | 40.9 | 22.1 |
| 7–8 Jul | JNN | Shinzo Abe | 43.1 | 55.8 | 1.3 |
| 6–8 Jul | NHK | Shinzo Abe | 44.1 | 38.8 | 17.1 |
| 23–24 Jun | Mainichi Shimbun | Shinzo Abe | 36 | 40 | 22 |
| 22–24 Jun | Nikkei & TV Tokyo | Shinzo Abe | 52 | 42 | 6 |
| 16–17 Jun | ANN | Shinzo Abe | 39.4 | 44.5 | 16.1 |
| 16–17 Jun | Asahi Shimbun | Shinzo Abe | 38 | 45 | 17 |
| 16–17 Jun | Kyodo News | Shinzo Abe | 44.9 | 43.2 | 11.9 |
| 15–17 Jun | NTV | Shinzo Abe | 39.4 | 41.9 | 18.7 |
| 15–17 Jun | Yomiuri Shimbun | Shinzo Abe | 45 | 44 | 11 |
| 8–11 Jun | Jiji Press | Shinzo Abe | 35.5 | 43.4 | 21.1 |
| 8–10 Jun | NHK | Shinzo Abe | 37.8 | 43.5 | 18.6 |
| 2–3 Jun | JNN | Shinzo Abe | 39.0 | 59.1 | 2.1 |
| 26–27 May | Mainichi Shimbun | Shinzo Abe | 31 | 48 | 19 |
| 25–27 May | Nikkei & TV Tokyo | Shinzo Abe | 42 | 53 | 5 |
| 19–20 May | ANN | Shinzo Abe | 34.1 | 51.1 | 14.8 |
| 19–20 May | Asahi Shimbun | Shinzo Abe | 36 | 44 | 20 |
| 18–20 May | NTV | Shinzo Abe | 32.4 | 50.6 | 17.0 |
| 18–20 May | Yomiuri Shimbun | Shinzo Abe | 42 | 47 | 11 |
| 11–14 May | Jiji Press | Shinzo Abe | 38.1 | 43.0 | 18.9 |
| 12–13 May | JNN | Shinzo Abe | 40.6 | 57.7 | 1.7 |
| 12–13 May | Kyodo News | Shinzo Abe | 38.9 | 50.3 | 10.8 |
| 11–13 May | NHK | Shinzo Abe | 37.8 | 43.5 | 18.7 |
| 27–29 Apr | Nikkei & TV Tokyo | Shinzo Abe | 43 | 51 | 7 |
| 14 Mar – 25 Apr | Asahi Shimbun | Shinzo Abe | 36 | 56 | 8 |
| 21–22 Apr | ANN | Shinzo Abe | 29.0 | 55.2 | 15.8 |
| 21–22 Apr | Mainichi Shimbun | Shinzo Abe | 30 | 49 | 20 |
| 20–22 Apr | Yomiuri Shimbun | Shinzo Abe | 39 | 53 | 8 |
| 14–15 Apr | Asahi Shimbun | Shinzo Abe | 31 | 52 | 17 |
| 13–15 Apr | NTV | Shinzo Abe | 26.7 | 53.4 | 20.0 |
| 6–9 Apr | Jiji Press | Shinzo Abe | 38.4 | 42.6 | 19 |
| 7–8 Apr | JNN | Shinzo Abe | 40.0 | 58.4 | 1.7 |
| 6–8 Apr | NHK | Shinzo Abe | 37.7 | 44.5 | 17.8 |
| 31 Mar – 1 Apr | Kyodo News | Shinzo Abe | 42.4 | 47.5 | 10.1 |
| 31 Mar – 1 Apr | Yomiuri Shimbun | Shinzo Abe | 42 | 50 | 8 |
| 24–25 Mar | ANN | Shinzo Abe | 32.6 | 54.9 | 12.5 |
| 23–25 Mar | Nikkei & TV Tokyo | Shinzo Abe | 42 | 49 | 9 |
| 17–18 Mar | Asahi Shimbun | Shinzo Abe | 31 | 48 | 21 |
| 17–18 Mar | Kyodo News | Shinzo Abe | 38.7 | 48.2 | 13.1 |
| 17–18 Mar | Mainichi Shimbun | Shinzo Abe | 33 | 47 | 19 |
| 16–18 Mar | NTV | Shinzo Abe | 30.3 | 53.0 | 16.7 |
| 9–12 Mar | Jiji Press | Shinzo Abe | 39.3 | 40.4 | 17.6 |
| 9–11 Mar | NHK | Shinzo Abe | 43.8 | 38.1 | 18.1 |
| 9–11 Mar | Yomiuri Shimbun | Shinzo Abe | 48 | 42 | 9 |
| 3–4 Mar | JNN | Shinzo Abe | 49.3 | 48.9 | 1.9 |
| 3–4 Mar | Kyodo News | Shinzo Abe | 48.1 | 39.0 | 12.9 |
| 24–25 Feb | ANN | Shinzo Abe | 44.3 | 41.7 | 14.0 |
| 24–25 Feb | Mainichi Shimbun | Shinzo Abe | 45 | 32 | 20 |
| 23–25 Feb | Nikkei | Shinzo Abe | 56 | 36 | 8 |
| 17–18 Feb | Asahi Shimbun | Shinzo Abe | 44 | 37 | 19 |
| 16–18 Feb | NTV | Shinzo Abe | 44.0 | 37.3 | 18.7 |
| 10–12 Feb | NHK | Shinzo Abe | 46.4 | 34.3 | 19.3 |
| 9–12 Feb | Jiji Press | Shinzo Abe | 48.7 | 31.9 | 19.4 |
| 10–11 Feb | Kyodo News | Shinzo Abe | 50.8 | 36.9 | 12.3 |
| 10–11 Feb | Yomiuri Shimbun | Shinzo Abe | 54 | 36 | 9 |
| 3–4 Feb | JNN | Shinzo Abe | 50.6 | 46.8 | 2.6 |
| 26–28 Jan | Nikkei | Shinzo Abe | 55 | 37 | 8 |
| 26–28 Jan | NTV | Shinzo Abe | 36.9 | 43.8 | 19.2 |
| 20–21 Jan | Asahi Shimbun | Shinzo Abe | 45 | 33 | 22 |
| 20–21 Jan | ANN | Shinzo Abe | 40.1 | 42.3 | 17.6 |
| 20–21 Jan | Mainichi Shimbun | Shinzo Abe | 44 | 38 | 16 |
| 12–15 Jan | Jiji Press | Shinzo Abe | 46.6 | 33.6 | 19.8 |
| 13–14 Jan | Kyodo News | Shinzo Abe | 49.7 | 36.6 | 13.7 |
| 13–14 Jan | JNN | Shinzo Abe | 54.6 | 43.9 | 1.5 |
| 12–14 Jan | Yomiuri Shimbun | Shinzo Abe | 54 | 35 | 11 |
| 6–8 Jan | NHK | Shinzo Abe | 45.7 | 37.0 | 17.3 |

=== 2017 ===
| Fieldwork date | Polling firm | Prime Minister | Approve | Disapprove | Und. / no answer |
|---|---|---|---|---|---|
| 16–17 Dec | Asahi Shimbun | Shinzo Abe | 41 | 38 | 21 |
| 15–17 Dec | Nikkei & TV Tokyo | Shinzo Abe | 50 | 40 | 10 |
| 15–17 Dec | NTV | Shinzo Abe | 37.8 | 45.3 | 16.9 |
| 8–11 Dec | Jiji Press | Shinzo Abe | 42.6 | 36.1 | 21.3 |
| 9–10 Dec | ANN | Shinzo Abe | 43.7 | 39.6 | 16.7 |
| 8–10 Dec | NHK | Shinzo Abe | 49 | 35 | 16 |
| 8–10 Dec | Yomiuri Shimbun | Shinzo Abe | 53 | 36 | 11 |
| 18 Oct – 6 Dec | Mainichi & SSRC | Shinzo Abe | 40 | 41 | 18 |
| 2–3 Dec | Kyodo News | Shinzo Abe | 47.2 | 40.4 | 12.4 |
| 2–3 Dec | JNN | Shinzo Abe | 52.7 | 45.7 | 1.6 |
| 24–26 Nov | Nikkei | Shinzo Abe | 52 | 39 | 9 |
| 17–19 Nov | NTV | Shinzo Abe | 41.1 | 41.4 | 17.5 |
| 10–13 Nov | Jiji Press | Shinzo Abe | 45.4 | 37.1 | 17.5 |
| 11–12 Nov | Mainichi Shimbun | Shinzo Abe | 46 | 36 | 15 |
| 11–12 Nov | Asahi Shimbun | Shinzo Abe | 44 | 39 | 17 |
| 11–12 Nov | JNN | Shinzo Abe | 53.1 | 45.8 | 1.1 |
| 10–12 Nov | NHK | Shinzo Abe | 46 | 35 | 19 |
| 4–5 Nov | ANN | Shinzo Abe | 44.2 | 41.5 | 14.3 |
| 1–2 Nov | Nikkei & TV Tokyo | Shinzo Abe | 54 | 38 | 7 |
| 1–2 Nov | Yomiuri Shimbun | Shinzo Abe | 52 | 40 | 7 |
| 1–2 Nov | Kyodo News | Shinzo Abe | 49.5 | 38.3 | 12.2 |
| 23–24 Oct | Asahi Shimbun | Shinzo Abe | 42 | 39 | 19 |
| 23–24 Oct | Yomiuri Shimbun | Shinzo Abe | 52 | 37 | 10 |

== See also ==
- Opinion polling for the 2024 Japanese general election
