= Opinion polling for the 2024 Japanese general election =

In the run up to the 2024 Japanese general election, various organisations carried out opinion polling to gauge voting intention. Results of such polls are displayed in this article. The date range for these opinion polls is from the previous general election, held on 31 October 2021 to 27 October 2024.

== Graphical summary ==
LOESS curve of the party identification polling for the next Japanese general election with a 7-day average

== Party identification ==
=== 2024 ===
Fieldwork date	Polling firm	Sample size	LDP	CDP	Ishin	Komei	JCP	DPFP	Reiwa	DIY	SDP	NHK	Others	No party	Und./ no ans.	Lead
27 Oct	Election results	53.84% (Note: Election turnout.)	26.7	21.2	9.4	10.9	6.2	11.3	7	3.4	1.7	0	2.1 (Note: Conservative Party of Japan: 2.1%)	–	–	5.5
19–20 Oct	Kyodo News	1,262	31.8	15.4	5.4	4.2	2.5	5.4	4	1.6	1.1	0.5	0.5	21.1	6.5	10.7
18–20 Oct	NHK	2,524	31.3	9.2	3.4	4.4	2.9	2.3	1.9	1.1	0.6	0.1	1.1	34.8	6.9	3.5
12–14 Oct	NHK	2,515	35.1	8.4	3	3.7	2.5	1.6	1.4	0.6	0.5	0	1.1	34.4	7.9	0.7
12–13 Oct	Senkyo.com/JX	982	33.2	13.5	4.9	3.5	5.5	2.2	1.7	1.2	1.2	0	–	33	–	0.2
11–14 Oct	Jiji Press	1,172	18.9	4.6	2.2	4	1.5	1.2	1.5	0.4	0.3	–	–	62.2	3.2	43.3
11–12 Oct	Kyodo News	1,264	37.7	12.6	4.9	5.1	2.7	3	2	0.8	0.5	0.5	1.2	21.1	7.9	16.6
9 Oct	The House of Representatives is dissolved. A general election is called for 27 October 2024.															
5–6 Oct	JNN	1,019	33.9	11.7	3.9	2.2	2	1.5	0.9	0.8	0.4	–	0.8	37.1	4.8	3.2
5–6 Oct	ANN	1,024	40.8	12.4	3.3	3.6	4.8	1.1	1.9	0.7	0.3	–	1.5	25.2	4.4	15.6
3 Oct	Mainichi/SSRC	2,061	29	10	4	2	1	3	2	1	–	–	–	45	3	16
1–2 Oct	Nikkei/TV Tokyo	784	41	11	5	3	3	1	2	–	–	–	1	29	3	12
1–2 Oct	Kyodo News	1,102	42.3	11.7	5.4	4.1	4	3.9	2.5	1.1	0.4	–	4.9 (Note: Others: 3.4%; Free Education For All: 1.5%)	18.6	1.1	23.7
1–2 Oct	Asahi	1,178	33	6	2	3	1	2	1	1	–	–	1	42	8	9
1–2 Oct	Yomiuri/NNN	1,095	38	7	3	3	2	1	1	–	1	–	–	40	3	2
1 Oct	Shigeru Ishiba succeeds Fumio Kishida as Prime Minister of Japan. The Ishiba Cabinet is formed.															
28 Sep	Keiichi Ishii succeeds Natsuo Yamaguchi as President of Komeito.															
27 Sep	Shigeru Ishiba is elected President of the LDP.															
23 Sep	Yoshihiko Noda is elected President of the CDP.															
21–22 Sep	ANN	1,012	39.8	10.8	4.8	3.9	3.8	1.5	1.6	0.4	1	–	1.4 (Note: Others: 1.3%; Free Education For All: 0.1%)	26.8	4.1	13
21 Sep	SSRC	2,044	25	10	6	2	2	2	3	1	–	–	1	49	–	24
14–15 Sep	Senkyo.com/JX	992	32.5	14.2	4.7	2.8	5.3	0.8	1.1	0.8	0.7	0.3	–	36.7	–	4.2
14–15 Sep	Sankei/FNN	1,012	30.6	7.5	2.5	2.5	1.7	0.9	1.2	0.3	0.4	0.2	0.1 (Note: Free Education For All: 0.1%)	46.9	5.2	16.3
14–15 Sep	Asahi	1,070	28	7	2	2	1	1	–	–	–	–	1	48	10	20
13–15 Sep	Yomiuri/NNN	1,040	31	5	3	2	2	1	1	1	1	–	–	48	4	17
13–15 Sep	Nikkei/TV Tokyo	902	37	9	5	3	4	2	2	–	1	–	1	34	3	3
6–9 Sep	Jiji Press	1,170	21.1	4	2.3	2.7	1.3	0.9	0.4	0.2	0.3	–	0.1 (Note: Free Education For All: 0.1%)	64.1	2.6	43
7–8 Sep	JNN	1,011	31	5.3	2.3	2.4	1.7	1.2	1.3	0.5	0.2	–	1.2 (Note: Others: 0.6%; Free Education For All: 0.6%)	48.6	4.3	17.6
6–8 Sep	NHK	1,220	31.3	6.6	3	2.3	2.6	1	0.7	0.1	0.6	0.2	0.5	45.3	5.7	14
24–25 Aug	SSRC	1,752	23	9	5	2	2	3	3	1	–	–	1	51	–	28
24–25 Aug	Asahi	1,058	26	7	2	3	2	1	1	–	–	–	1	50	7	24
24–25 Aug	ANN	1,015	39.1	11	4.2	3.8	3.2	1.7	2.1	0.5	0.7	–	0.7	29.4	3.6	9.7
23–25 Aug	Yomiuri/NNN	1,056	30	6	3	2	1	1	2	–	–	–	–	48	7	18
21–22 Aug	Nikkei/TV Tokyo	595	36	8	7	2	2	3	2	–	–	–	1	34	4	2
17–19 Aug	Kyodo News	1,064	36.7	12.3	8.5	4.2	4.2	2.8	3.3	2.3	1	0.5	0.7 (Note: Others: 0.6%; Free Education For All: 0.1%)	17.8	5.7	18.9
17–18 Aug	Senkyo.com/JX	987	29.5	13.3	5.5	3.1	3	0.8	1.2	1.2	0.2	0.6	0.1 (Note: Free Education For All: 0.1%)	41.4	–	11.9
14 Aug	Fumio Kishida announces he will not seek re-election as President of the LDP.															
5 Aug	Nikkei 225 decline															
2–5 Aug	Jiji Press	1,194	19.9	3.7	1.8	2.2	1.3	1	0.7	0.4	0.2	–	0.1 (Note: Free Education For All: 0.1%)	65.5	3.2	45.6
3–4 Aug	JNN	1,010	27.1	5.2	3.7	2.3	2.6	2	1.4	0.6	0.4	–	0.9	48.1	5.7	21
2–4 Aug	NHK	1,199	29.9	5.2	2.4	3.3	2.6	0.8	0.8	0.3	0.5	0.1	0.3	45.7	8.1	15.8
26–28 Jul	Nikkei/TV Tokyo	792	32	10	6	5	3	2	2	1	1	–	1	35	3	3
20–21 Jul	Sankei/FNN	1,033	25.1	6.1	2.6	2.8	4.1	1.3	2.7	1	0.5	–	–	51.1	2.7	26
20–21 Jul	Kyodo News	1,035	33.1	10.1	6.6	3	3.2	4.7	3.3	0.3	0.8	0.1	2.8 (Note: Others: 2%; Free Education For All: 0.8%)	30	2	3.1
20–21 Jul	Mainichi	1,020	21	14	8	4	5	4	5	–	–	–	–	33	6	12
20–21 Jul	SSRC	2,044	20	7	6	3	2	4	3	1	–	–	1	54	–	34
19–21 Jul	Yomiuri/NNN	1,031	24	5	5	3	2	1	1	–	1	–	–	54	4	30
13–14 Jul	Senkyo.com/JX	987	25.9	12.2	4.9	3.5	7.2	1	1.2	1.3	1	0.7	0.1 (Note: Free Education For All: 0.1%)	40.9	–	15
13–14 Jul	ANN	1,012	35.2	9.5	5.5	4.7	4	2.1	1.7	0.4	0.6	–	1.6	31.4	3.3	3.8
5–8 Jul	Jiji Press	1,160	16	6.3	2.7	2.5	2.3	0.8	0.9	0.3	0.4	–	–	64.1	3.7	48.1
6–7 Jul	JNN	1,021	24.1	7.4	4.3	2.6	2.1	1.6	3.4	0.6	0.6	–	1 (Note: Others: 0.6%; Free Education For All: 0.4%)	47.8	4.5	23.7
5–7 Jul	NHK	1,211	28.4	5.2	3.6	3.1	2.6	2.1	0.8	0.2	0.2	–	0.6	47.2	6	18.8
28–30 Jun	Nikkei/TV Tokyo	838	31	9	9	3	4	2	2	1	–	–	1	33	–	2
22–23 Jun	SSRC	2,043	18	10	6	2	2	3	2	1	1	–	1	52	2	34
22–23 Jun	Mainichi	1,057	18	17	8	4	6	4	5	1	1	–	–	32	4	14
22–23 Jun	Kyodo News	1,056	26.5	11.7	7.2	2	3.4	2.7	5.1	1	0.2	0.3	3.2 (Note: Others: 2.1%; Free Education For All: 1.1%)	34.8	1.9	8.3
21–23 Jun	Yomiuri/NNN	1,023	25	6	6	3	2	2	2	–	–	–	1	47	6	22
15–16 Jun	Senkyo.com/JX	984	22.3	16.2	6.2	3.4	6	1.8	2.1	0.9	1	0.1	0.3 (Note: Free Education For All: 0.3%)	39.7	–	17.4
15–16 Jun	Sankei/FNN	1,013	25.5	8.1	4.4	2.6	2.1	1.5	2.3	0.3	0.5	–	1.5 (Note: Others: 1.2%; Free Education For All: 0.3%)	47.9	3.3	22.4
15–16 Jun	ANN	1,026	30.7	12.6	7.8	4.2	3.9	2.2	2.9	0.2	0.4	–	2	30.1	3	0.6
7–10 Jun	Jiji Press	1,240	16.4	4.4	2.4	3.4	1.6	1	0.9	0.2	0.1	–	–	66.8	2.8	50.4
7–9 Jun	NHK	1,192	25.5	9.5	3.6	2.4	3	1.1	1.4	0.2	0.3	0.3	0.5	44	8.1	18.5
1–2 Jun	JNN	1,008	23.8	7.3	4.3	3.1	3	2.3	2	1	0.2	–	1	48.2	3.8	24.4
24–26 May	Nikkei/TV Tokyo	813	27	12	9	5	3	2	2	1	–	–	1	33	5	6
18–19 May	Mainichi	1,093	17	20	10	3	7	3	5	2	1	–	–	28	4	8
18–19 May	ANN	1,045	32.5	12.9	5.9	4.8	3.2	1.4	2.1	0.6	0.9	–	1.7	30	4	2.5
17–19 May	Yomiuri/NNN	1,033	27	7	4	3	2	1	3	1	–	–	1	46	5	19
11–13 May	Kyodo News	1,055	24.7	12.7	7.4	3.4	4.9	4.5	3	0.7	0.7	0.4	0.4 (Note: Free Education For All: 0.4%)	32.3	4.9	7.6
11–12 May	Senkyo.com/JX	976	23.5	17.8	4.8	3.3	6.1	0.7	1.5	0.7	0.5	0.6	0.1 (Note: Free Education For All: 0.1%)	40.3	–	16.8
10–13 May	Jiji Press	1,260	15.7	5.1	2.1	2.6	1.2	0.9	0.8	0.8	0.4	–	0.2 (Note: Free Education For All: 0.2%)	66.9	3.3	51.2
10–12 May	NHK	1,202	27.5	6.6	4.5	3.1	3	1.1	1.2	0.2	0.7	–	1.1	44.3	6.7	16.8
4–5 May	JNN	1,013	23.4	10.2	4.6	2.9	2.9	2.3	1.8	0.3	0.2	–	1.4 (Note: Others: 1.2%; Free Education For All: 0.2%)	46.9	3.1	23.5
29–30 Apr	Nikkei/TV Tokyo	876	29	13	8	4	4	2	3	1	–	–	1	33	2	4
28 Apr	2024 Japan by-elections															
20–21 Apr	Mainichi	1,032	20	15	9	3	6	4	6	–	–	–	–	28	9	8
19–21 Apr	Yomiuri/NNN	1,035	24	5	4	3	2	1	3	1	–	–	1	51	5	27
13–15 Apr	Kyodo News	1,049	25.1	10.9	8.1	3.5	2.5	2.3	4.5	1.7	0.6	0.5	0.9 (Note: Free Education For All: 0.9%)	35.2	4.2	10.1
13–14 Apr	ANN	1,037	36	9.3	6.4	3.3	4.5	2.3	2.3	0.4	0.3	–	1.4	29.4	4.7	6.6
13–14 Apr	Senkyo.com/JX	981	24.7	15.4	4.4	2.7	5.7	1.4	1.5	0.5	0.7	0.3	0.2 (Note: Free Education For All: 0.2%)	42.5	–	17.8
5–8 Apr	Jiji Press	1,200	15.3	3.8	3.5	3.6	1.6	0.7	1.2	0.7	0.3	–	–	66.9	2.4	51.6
5–7 Apr	NHK	1,204	28.4	6.5	4.7	4	2.4	1.5	1.7	0.5	0.5	0.1	0.5	41.3	8	12.9
30–31 Mar	JNN	1,036	25	6.1	4.3	2.1	2.8	0.7	0.8	0.8	0.4	–	1.5 (Note: Others: 1.4%; Free Education For All: 0.1%)	52.9	2.6	27.9
22–24 Mar	Nikkei/TV Tokyo	925	28	11	9	3	4	3	4	1	1	–	–	34	2	6
22–24 Mar	Yomiuri/NNN	1,020	23	8	5	3	2	2	2	–	–	–	1	51	3	28
16–17 Mar	ANN	1,031	35.5	11.1	7.5	3.2	4	1.4	3.7	0.8	0.8	–	1.3	25.9	4.8	9.6
16–17 Mar	SSRC	2,044	16	9	8	2	2	4	4	1	1	–	1	53	–	37
16–17 Mar	Senkyo.com/JX	983	23.6	13.6	6.8	3.7	6.6	1.4	2.6	0.6	0.3	0.4	0.2 (Note: Free Education For All: 0.2%)	40.1	–	16.5
16–17 Mar	Mainichi	997	17	13	10	3	7	4	6	–	–	–	–	34	6	17
16–17 Mar	Asahi	1,065	22	6	4	3	3	1	4	–	–	–	–	56	1	34
8–11 Mar	Jiji Press	1,160	17.7	4.7	3.6	2.8	1.6	1	1.6	0.3	0.3	–	–	64.8	1.6	47.1
9–10 Mar	Kyodo News	1,043	24.5	10.1	8.9	4.1	4.7	3.1	4.3	0.9	0.4	0.1	1.5 (Note: Free Education For All: 1.5%)	31.3	6.1	6.8
8–11 Mar	NHK	1,206	28.6	6.8	3.8	3.1	2.8	1.2	2.5	0.4	0.6	–	0.7	42.4	7	13.8
24–25 Feb	ANN	1,034	35.2	11.9	7.4	2.8	4.5	2.2	2.3	0.8	0.9	–	1.3	26.4	4.3	8.8
23–25 Feb	Nikkei/TV Tokyo	867	25	9	8	6	3	4	3	1	1	–	1	36	3	11
17–18 Feb	SSRC	2,043	16	9	10	2	3	4	3	1	–	–	1	50	1	34
17–18 Feb	Mainichi	1,024	16	16	13	3	7	5	6	1	–	–	–	28	5	12
17–18 Feb	Senkyo.com/JX	991	23.3	12.9	6.5	3.9	6	1.5	2.3	0.6	0.6	0.5	0.1 (Note: Free Education For All: 0.1%)	41.8	–	18.5
16–18 Feb	Yomiuri/NNN	1,083	24	5	4	4	2	2	2	–	–	–	–	52	5	28
10–12 Feb	NHK	1,215	30.5	6.7	3.1	3.2	2.1	1.3	1.1	0.7	0.2	0.1	0.6	44	6.4	13.5
9–12 Feb	Jiji Press	1,180	16.3	4.1	3.3	3.6	2.4	0.4	0.9	0.3	0.3	–	–	64.7	3.7	48.4
27–28 Jan	JNN/Mainichi	1,049	23	14	9	3	8	4	7	2	–	–	–	27	3	4
26–28 Jan	Nikkei/TV Tokyo	969	31	8	7	4	5	4	4	1	–	–	1	32	3	1
21 Jan	SSRC	2,052	20	8	8	2	3	3	3	1	–	–	1	49	2	29
20–21 Jan	ANN	1,007	34.6	8.1	8.4	4.2	6.3	1.4	2.1	0.6	0.2	0.1	1.1	29.4	3.5	5.2
19–21 Jan	Yomiuri/NNN	1,074	25	5	5	3	2	2	3	–	–	–	0	48	7	23
19 Jan	Dissolution of Kōchikai, Shisuikai and Seiwakai factions of the LDP.															
18 Jan	Tomoko Tamura succeeds Kazuo Shii as Chairperson of the JCP.															
13–14 Jan	Senkyo.com/JX	996	30.2	12.9	7.2	3	5.5	1	1.5	0.9	0.4	0.3	–	37	–	6.8
12–14 Jan	NHK	1,212	30.9	5.3	3.9	3.4	1.9	0.8	1.8	0.4	0.3	0.2	0.7	45	5.4	14.1
6–7 Jan	JNN	1,209	29.1	5.5	4.8	2.2	2.1	2.2	2.6	0.5	0.7	0.1	0.7 (Note: Others: 0.6%; Free Education For All: 0.1%)	47.2	2.3	18.1
1 Jan	2024 Noto earthquake															
31 Oct 2021	2021 general election	55.97%	34.7	20.0	14.0	12.4	7.3	4.5	3.9	–	1.8	1.4	1.7	–	–	14.7

=== 2023 ===
Fieldwork date	Polling firm	Sample size	LDP	CDP	Ishin	Komei	JCP	DPFP	Reiwa	DIY	SDP	NHK	Others	No party	Und./ no ans.	Lead
16–17 Dec	JNN/Mainichi	1,080	17	14	13	3	5	4	7	2	1	–	–	31	3	14
16–17 Dec	Senkyo.com/JX	990	23.9	11.6	6.5	3.7	5.3	1	2.4	1	0.8	0.3	0.3 (Note: Free Education For All: 0.3%)	43.1	–	19.2
16–17 Dec	ANN	1,011	37.1	9.9	6.1	2.3	4.6	2.1	2.0	0.3	0.6	0.1	2.2 (Note: Others: 2.1%; Free Education For All: 0.1%)	29.5	3.2	7.6
16–17 Dec	Kyodo News	1,018	26	9.3	12	3	3.3	5.9	3.2	1.4	1.3	0.3	1.8 (Note: Free Education For All: 1.8%)	29.1	3.4	3.1
15–17 Dec	Yomiuri/NNN	1,069	28	5	5	3	2	1	2	1	–	–	1	48	4	20
15–16 Dec	Nikkei/TV Tokyo	729	30	9	12	3	3	2	4	1	1	–	1	32	2	2
8–11 Dec	Jiji Press	1,188	18.3	4.4	3.2	2.8	1.9	1.1	1.5	0.4	0.3	–	–	62.5	3.6	44.2
8–10 Dec	NHK	1,212	29.5	7.4	4	3.2	2.6	2.1	1.7	0.4	0.3	0.1	0.2	43.3	5.1	13.8
8 Dec	Slush fund scandal															
3 Dec	SSRC	2,047	19	7	9	2	2	4	4	1	–	–	1	49	–	30
25–26 Nov	ANN	1,015	38.4	8.3	6.3	3.9	3.3	1.5	2.6	0.7	0.2	0.1	1.8	29.7	3.2	8.7
24–26 Nov	Nikkei/TV Tokyo	869	34	8	8	4	3	3	2	2	–	–	1	30	5	4
18–19 Nov	Mainichi	1,032	24	9	14	3	6	5	7	2	–	–	–	26	4	2
17–19 Nov	Yomiuri/NNN	1,067	28	5	7	2	1	2	2	1	–	–	1	48	3	20
11–12 Nov	Senkyo.com/JX	993	28	12	7.6	3.4	5.4	2.1	1.8	0.5	0.7	0.2	–	38.3	–	10.3
10–12 Nov	NHK	1,224	37.7	4.7	4	3.4	2.6	0.9	1.4	0.9	0.2	0.1	0.7	38.5	4.8	0.8
5 Nov	SSRC	1,511	20	7	10	3	3	3	4	1			2	47	–	27
28–29 Oct	ANN	1,019	38.3	10.9	6.6	3.9	3.6	2.3	1.7	0.6	0.9	0.1	1.9	23.6	5.6	14.7
27–29 Oct	Nikkei/TV Tokyo	852	32	9	9	5	4	3	3	1	1	–	1	30	4	2
22 Oct	October 2023 Japan by-elections															
14–15 Oct	Mainichi	1,030	23	11	13	4	4	5	5	3	–	–	–	27	5	4
14–15 Oct	Senkyo.com/JX	991	28.7	11.9	8.2	4.3	4.6	2	1.4	1.9	0.5	0.2	–	36.2	–	7.5
13–15 Oct	Yomiuri/NNN	1,022	30	4	7	4	2	1	1	1	–	–	–	27	23	3
7–9 Oct	NHK	1,219	36.2	5.3	4.9	2.5	2.5	1.2	0.3	0.5	0.5	0.1	0.6	40	5.4	3.8
6–9 Oct	Jiji Press	1,176	21	3.1	3.9	3.1	1.7	1.4	1.1	0.2	0.3	–	–	61.1	3.1	40.1
1 Oct	SSRC	1,505	21	7	12	2	2	3	3	2	1	–	1	46	–	25
30 Sep – 1 Oct	JNN	1,208	31.6	5.1	5.5	2.4	2.7	1.4	1.2	0.7	0.3	–	1.3	45.7	2.1	14.1
23–24 Sep	ANN	1,018	41	7.8	9.5	2.7	2.9	2.5	1.9	0.5	0.6	0.3	2.1	24.8	3,4	16.2
16–17 Sep	Mainichi	1,030	26	11	13	2	5	5	5	3	1	–	–	25	4	1
13–14 Sep	Nikkei/TV Tokyo	749	38	6	11	4	5	3	3	1	–	–	1	24	3	14
13–14 Sep	Yomiuri/NNN	1,088	31	4	6	3	3	3	1	1	–	–	–	41	5	10
13 Sep	Second Reshuffle of Kishida Cabinet															
9–10 Sep	Senkyo.com/JX	995	27.7	12.1	8.3	3.8	4.7	1.5	2.3	1.7	1	0.2	–	36.6	–	8.9
8–10 Sep	NHK	1,236	34.1	4	5.8	2.2	2.3	1.9	0.9	1	0.4	0.2	–	42.8	4.4	8.7
3 Sep	SSRC	1,509	24	7	12	3	3	3	3	1	1	–	–	42	–	18
2–3 Sep	JNN	1,219	32.4	4.9	6.1	2.8	2.2	1.3	1	1.4	0.5	0.1	0.5	43.4	3.4	11.5
25–27 Aug	Nikkei/TV Tokyo	847	38	5	10	4	2	2	3	1	–	–	–	33	2	5
25–27 Aug	Yomiuri/NNN	1,033	30	3	6	3	3	3	3	–	–	–	–	44	3	14
19–20 Aug	Kyodo News	1,049	35.8	8.7	11.4	3.6	3.5	4.4	4.8	0.6	0.7	0.5	0.9	22.5	2.6	13.3
19–20 Aug	ANN	1,010	39.4	6.7	10.3	3.9	3.5	2.5	2	0.6	0.4	0.3	2	25.6	2.8	13.8
12–13 Aug	Senkyo.com/JX	997	29	9.9	9.5	2.6	5.8	1.6	2.2	1.6	0.4	0.2	–	37.1	–	8.1
11–13 Aug	NHK	1,223	34.1	4.7	4.8	3.4	2.7	1.4	1.4	0.2	0.7	0.1	0.2	39.2	7	5.1
6 Aug	SSRC	1,509	23	8	13	2	2	2	3	1	–	–	0	44	2	21
5–6 Aug	JNN	1,206	30.5	4.6	6.7	2.5	2.1	1.7	3	0.7	0.4	0.4	0.3	43.6	3.5	13.1
28–30 Jul	Nikkei/TV Tokyo	904	36	6	10	4	6	3	3	1	–	–	–	27	4	9
22–23 Jul	Mainichi	1,022	24	9	16	4	6	4	7	3	–	1	–	25	1	1
21–23 Jul	Yomiuri/NNN	1,052	33	4	9	2	2	2	2	1	–	–	–	42	3	9
15–16 Jul	Senkyo.com/JX	997	29.8	9.6	9.9	2.9	4.7	1.2	1.8	1.6	0.7	0.5	–	37.2	–	7.4
14–16 Jul	Kyodo News	1,034	30.1	8.7	10.6	5.9	2.9	3	3.2	0.9	0.5	0.5	0	32.5	1.2	2.4
8–9 Jul	ANN	1,023	42	7.1	10	3.9	2	1.9	2	0.6	0.4	0.5	2.1	24.5	3	7.5
7–10 Jul	Jiji Press	1,184	23.6	3.2	5.2	3.6	1.5	0.8	1.7	0.9	0.2	–	–	56.8	2.5	33.2
7–9 Jul	NHK	1,218	34.2	5.1	5.6	3.9	2.1	1.1	0.7	0.7	0.6	0.3	0.4	38.7	6.8	4.5
2 Jul	SSRC	1,501	25	8	11	3	3	3	3	1	1	–	1	41	–	16
23–25 Jun	Nikkei/TV Tokyo	913	34	9	12	3	3	3	3	2	–	–	–	27	4	7
23–25 Jun	Yomiuri/NNN	1,018	34	4	6	3	1	2	2	1	–	–	–	40	7	6
17–18 Jun	Senkyo.com/JX	993	30.1	9.9	8.4	4.9	5.9	1.3	1.4	1.3	0.8	0.3	–	35.6	–	5.5
10–11 Jun	ANN	1,021	41.5	8.0	8.7	3.9	4.8	1.5	1.6	1.1	0.3	0.5	1.3	23.6	3.2	17.9
9–11 Jun	NHK	1,208	34.7	4.1	6.2	3.5	2.2	1.2	0.9	0.9	0.6	0.2	0.4	38.6	6.5	3.9
4–5 Jun	JNN	1,202	32.7	4.3	7.9	3.9	2.5	2.1	1.4	0.9	0.4	0.2	0.8	39.3	3.6	6.6
4 Jun	SSRC	1,502	25	7	12	3	3	3	3	1	–	1	–	41	–	16
27–28 May	Kyodo News	1,052	40.9	8.8	12.6	4.5	3.6	2.1	3.5	0.7	0.4	0.2	–	19.8	2.9	21.1
26–28 May	Nikkei/TV Tokyo	928	37	8	13	3	2	2	1	1	1	–	–	29	3	8
20–21 May	Yomiuri/NNN	1,061	38	5	7	2	3	1	2	1	–	–	–	37	4	1
20–21 May	Mainichi	1,053	28	9	17	4	6	3	4	–	–	–	–	24	5	4
19–21 May	49th G7 summit in Hiroshima															
13–14 May	Senkyo.com/JX	1,000	30.6	10.3	8.4	4.2	5.3	1.8	1.9	1.5	0.9	0.3	–	34.8	–	4.2
13–14 May	ANN	1,028	41.6	7.4	9.8	4.4	4.2	1.9	1.2	0.9	0.3	0.4	0.9	23.7	3.3	17.9
12–15 May	Jiji News	1,228	24.4	4.2	5.9	3.9	1.4	0.7	0.7	0.5	0.3	0.1	–	54.8	3.1	24.4
12–14 May	NHK	1,225	36.5	4.2	6.7	2.4	2.0	1.1	0.8	0.5	0.4	–	0.3	38.9	6.1	2.4
29–30 Apr	Kyodo News	1,046	39.4	7.6	12.2	3.4	3.8	2	3.2	1.2	1.1	0.5	0.6	23.4	1.6	16
28–30 Apr	Nikkei/TV Tokyo	816	43	9	13	4	3	1	2	1	–	–	–	21	2	22
23 Apr	April 2023 Japan by-elections															
15–16 Apr	Senkyo.com/JX	992	32.6	10.6	7.4	4.5	6.3	1.1	1.4	1.2	0.5	0.4	–	34.1	–	1.5
15–16 Apr	ANN	1,054	43.7	7.1	8	2.8	3.9	2	1.2	0.7	0.5	0.5	2.1	22.3	5.3	21.4
14–16 Apr	Yomiuri/NNN	1,071	34	4	6	3	2	2	1	1	–	–	1	41	3	7
15 Apr	Attempted assassination of Fumio Kishida															
7–9 Apr	NHK	1,232	36	5.3	4.1	3.2	2.1	1.3	1	0.4	0.6	0.2	0.2	34	11.5	2
24–26 Mar	Nikkei/TV Tokyo	927	43	8	8	4	3	2	3	1	–	–	–	24	4	19
18–19 Mar	ANN	1,008	42.6	7.4	5.7	4.0	2.9	1.6	1.7	0.7	0.6	0.3	0.8	27.9	3.8	14.7
18–19 Mar	Mainichi	1,034	25	11	11	4	5	4	4	2	–	–	–	30	4	5
17–19 Mar	Yomiuri/NNN	1,001	35	5	3	3	2	2	1	1	–	1	–	42	5	7
11–13 Mar	Kyodo News	1,057	40.6	9.6	7.2	6.7	3.4	3.5	2.8	1.9	0.4	0.3	0.4	22	1.2	18.6
10–13 Mar	Jiji Press	1,198	23.3	3.5	2.9	3.4	1.3	0.7	0.9	1.2	0.3	0.1	–	61	1.4	37.7
11–12 Mar	Senkyo.com/JX	994	31.5	11.4	6.2	3.9	4.8	1.5	1.1	1.5	1.2	0.3	–	36.5	–	5
10–12 Mar	NHK	1,227	36.3	5.5	3.7	3.7	3.1	1.4	0.6	0.1	0.4	0.3	0.2	38.5	6.2	2.2
5 Mar	SSRC	3,072	28	8	9	3	3	3	2	1	–	1	–	41	–	13
24–26 Feb	Nikkei/TV Tokyo	819	39	9	8	4	3	2	2	–	–	–	–	27	6	12
18–19 Feb	ANN	1,011	42.3	8.5	6.2	3.7	3.4	1.9	1.4	0.7	0.5	0.5	1.7	23.9	5.3	18.4
17–19 Feb	Yomiuri/NNN	1,044	35	6	4	4	2	1	1	2	–	1	–	39	5	4
11–13 Feb	Kyodo News	1,060	38.2	8.5	8.7	4.1	5	3.1	1.8	1.3	0.9	0.6	0.8	24.8	2.2	13.4
11–12 Feb	Senkyo.com/JX	986	32.5	12.1	5.8	4.3	5.5	1.9	1	1	1.1	0.3	–	34.6	–	2.1
10–12 Feb	NHK	1,229	38	5.4	4.1	3.3	2.7	1.3	0.9	0.6	0.4	0.1	0.2	35.3	7.7	2.7
5 Feb	SSRC	3,076	27	8	9	3	4	4	2	1	1	1	–	40	–	13
4–5 Feb	JNN	1,167	31.7	6.4	4.2	2	2.3	1.8	1.1	0.9	0.6	0.2	0.4	45.1	3.3	13.4
28–29 Jan	Kyodo News	1,044	38.3	9.6	10.5	4	4	2.2	3	1.6	0.4	1.2	1.1	22.1	2	16.2
27–29 Jan	Nikkei/TV Tokyo	940	42	8	6	4	2	3	2	1	–	1	–	27	4	15
21–22 Jan	Mainichi	1,059	26	13	11	4	5	4	2	3	–	–	–	29	3	3
21–22 Jan	ANN	1,024	43.8	9.8	6.2	3.6	3.3	1.7	1.4	0.7	0.8	0.1	0.7	24.9	3	18.9
13–16 Jan	Jiji Press	1,210	24.6	2.5	3.6	3.4	1.8	1.5	0.7	0.7	0.1	0.4	–	58.7	2	34.1
14–15 Jan	Senkyo.com/JX	996	30.2	12.9	7.2	3	5.5	1	1.5	0.9	0.4	0.3	–	37	–	6.8
13–15 Jan	Yomiuri/NNN	1,072	36	6	3	3	2	1	1	1	–	1	–	41	5	5
7–9 Jan	NHK	1,250	38.9	5.7	3.4	3	2.5	1	0.8	0.7	0.6	0.2	0.2	36.7	6.4	2.2
8 Jan	SSRC	3,069	25	8	9	2	3	3	3	1	–	1	–	44	–	19
7–8 Jan	JNN	1,225	32.1	5.4	3.7	3.6	2.6	2	0.9	0.4	0.2	0.3	0.5	44.7	3.6	12.6
31 Oct 2021	2021 general election	55.97%	34.7	20.0	14.0	12.4	7.3	4.5	3.9	–	1.8	1.4	1.7	–	–	14.7

=== 2022 ===
Fieldwork date	Polling firm	Sample size	LDP	CDP	Ishin	Komei	JCP	DPFP	Reiwa	DIY	SDP	NHK	Others	No party	Und./ no ans.	Lead
23–25 Dec	Nikkei/TV Tokyo	947	40	7	9	2	4	2	2	1	–	1	–	29	3	11
17–18 Dec	Senkyo.com/JX	994	28.4	12.9	6.9	4	5.6	1.7	1.7	1.9	0.4	0.2	–	36.2	–	7.8
17–18 Dec	Kyodo News	1,051	40.1	9.2	9.5	3.9	3.4	3.2	2.5	1.6	0.7	0.4	1.6	22.3	1.6	17.8
17–18 Dec	ANN	1,015	43.5	9.2	6.2	3.5	4.2	2.8	1.9	0.9	0.8	0.2	0.7	23.2	2.9	20.3
17–18 Dec	SSRC	3,061	23	9	8	2	3	3	3	1	1	1	–	45	–	22
9–12 Dec	Jiji Press	1,228	22.8	5.5	3.8	3.7	1.8	1.4	0.8	1	0.2	0.2	–	55.7	3.1	32.9
9–11 Dec	NHK	1,234	35.5	7.3	4.1	3.1	2.8	1.5	1.1	0.4	0.3	0.3	0.2	37.3	6.3	1.8
3–4 Dec	JNN	1,227	32	5.6	5	2.6	2.9	0.8	1.4	1	0.4	0.2	0.1	45.8	2.2	13.8
2–4 Dec	Yomiuri/NNN	1,069	33	6	6	3	2	1	1	1	–	–	–	42	5	9
26–27 Nov	Kyodo News	1,035	34.7	9.5	12.3	4.5	3.8	3.8	1.9	1	0.8	0.7	1.4	24.8	0.8	9.9
25–27 Nov	Nikkei/TV Tokyo	1,030	40	10	8	3	4	2	2	2	1	1	–	26	1	14
19–20 Nov	SSRC	3,069	25	9	9	3	3	3	2	1	1	1	–	42	1	17
19–20 Nov	ANN	1,021	43.1	10.1	7.6	2.8	3.7	2.1	1.7	0.8	0.8	0.3	1	23.6	2.4	19.5
12–13 Nov	Senkyo.com/JX	995	28.1	15.7	6.3	2.3	5.3	1.7	1.3	1.7	0.9	0.4	–	36.2	–	8.1
11–14 Nov	Jiji Press	1,234	22.8	4.8	2.8	3.7	2	0.6	0.6	0.6	0.2	0.3	–	58.9	2.7	36.1
11–13 Nov	NHK	1,236	37.1	7	4.4	2.3	3.2	1.2	0.6	0.4	0.5	0.3	0.3	35.7	6.9	1.4
5–6 Nov	JNN	1,213	33.7	6.2	6.7	2.6	2.4	2	1.4	0.5	0.3	0.2	0.6	39.7	3.7	6
4–6 Nov	Yomiuri/NNN	1,049	33	6	5	4	3	1	1	1	–	–	–	43	3	10
29–30 Nov	Kyodo News	1,049	41.7	9.5	9.5	3.6	3.1	2.6	2.5	2.2	0.8	1	1.6	19.6	2.3	22.1
28–30 Nov	Nikkei/TV Tokyo	929	41	7	9	4	3	2	2	1	1	1	–	28	3	13
22–23 Nov	SSRC	3,072	23	7	8	3	3	2	3	1	1	1	–	42	6	19
15–16 Oct	Senkyo.com/JX	987	28.3	13.4	6.7	3.3	5.7	1.3	0.6	1.3	0.8	0.5	–	38.1	–	9.8
15–16 Oct	ANN	1,058	44.5	10	7.4	3.4	3.3	2	1.6	1.7	0.9	0.5	1.4	19.9	3.4	24.6
8–10 Oct	NHK	1,247	36.9	5.6	3.7	3	2.7	1.1	0.6	0.4	0.3	0.2	0.3	38.4	6.7	1.5
7–10 Oct	Jiji Press	1,266	23.5	3.6	4	2.9	1.9	1.1	0.7	0.6	0.4	0.3	–	58.9	2.1	35.4
8–9 Oct	Kyodo News	1,067	34.1	10.7	12.6	3.5	4.8	2.6	3.1	2.6	0.6	0.1	–	24.2	1.1	9.9
1–2 Oct	Yomiuri/NNN	1,089	40	5	5	3	2	2	1	1	1	–	–	37	3	3
17–18 Sep	Senkyo.com/JX	997	29.6	11.7	7.8	3.6	5	1.1	1.9	1.2	1.2	0.2	–	36.6	–	7
17–18 Sep	Kyodo News	1,049	39.3	9.9	9.8	3.5	4.3	2.9	2.3	1.8	1.2	0.7	0.9	21	2.4	18.3
17–18 Sep	ANN	1,013	43.8	10.3	6.5	3.4	3.6	1.4	1.6	0.5	0.6	0.1	1.4	23.1	3.7	20.7
17–18 Sep	Mainichi/SSRC	1,064	23	10	13	4	5	4	5	2	1	1	1	29	2	6
16–18 Sep	Nikkei/TV Tokyo	957	37	10	10	4	4	2	3	1	1	–	–	26	2	11
9–12 Sep	Jiji Press	1,238	22.4	4	3.4	3.4	2.3	1.3	0.7	0.7	0.2	0.2	–	59.1	2.3	36.7
9–11 Sep	NHK	1,255	36.2	4.8	5.1	2.9	2.5	2.1	1.5	1.6	0.4	0.4	0.2	34.9	7.4	1.3
3–4 Sep	JNN	1,218	34	5.5	6.3	4.4	1.8	1.4	1.3	1.3	0.6	0.6	0.6	37.2	5	3.2
2–4 Sep	Yomiuri/NNN	1,075	40	5	6	2	3	1	1	1	–	–	–	37	4	3
20–21 Aug	Mainichi/SSRC	965	29	10	13	2	5	4	4	4	1	1	1	25	1	4
20–21 Aug	ANN	1,016	44.9	8.3	8.3	3.1	4.5	2.4	1.4	1.4	0.6	0.6	1	20.3	3.2	24.6
13–14 Aug	Senkyo.com/JX	1,005	29	12.4	7	4	5.8	1.2	2.3	1.9	0.8	0.3	–	35.4	–	6.4
10–11 Aug	Kyodo News	1,052	40.6	10.2	11.3	5.4	3.8	3	2.8	1.6	0.5	0.7	0.9	16.6	2.6	24
10–11 Aug	Nikkei/TV Tokyo	907	46	9	13	3	2	3	2	1	1	–	1	15	2	31
10–11 Aug	Yomiuri/NNN	1,095	35	6	5	3	3	1	2	2	–	–	–	37	4	2
10 Aug	First Reshuffle of Kishida Cabinet															
5–8 Aug	Jiji Press	1,200	24.3	4.8	4.5	2.8	1.8	1.3	1.2	0.6	0.2	0.4	–	56.3	1.8	32
6–7 Aug	JNN	1,162	35.2	6.1	6.3	3.8	3.4	1.7	2	–	1	0.3	1.3	34.7	4.2	0.5
5–7 Aug	Yomiuri/NNN	1,035	38	6	5	3	3	1	1	2	1	1	–	36	3	2
5–7 Aug	NHK	1,223	36.1	5.5	6	2.7	3.4	1.5	1	0.9	0.4	0.5	0.6	34.3	7.2	1.8
30–31 Jul	Kyodo News	1,050	41	7	11.8	4.8	3.8	2.5	2.3	2.6	2.3	0.3	–	19.6	2	21.4
29–31 Jul	Nikkei/TV Tokyo	985	43	7	10	5	3	2	1	1	1	1	–	24	2	19
15–18 Jul	Jiji Press	1,224	26.5	4.1	4.5	3.8	1.3	1.9	1.6	1.3	0.5	0.2	–	51.6	2.7	25.1
16–18 Jul	NHK	1,216	38.4	5.3	6.5	4.4	3	1.6	1.4	0.9	0.6	0.9	0.1	29.6	7.3	8.8
16–17 Jul	Senkyo.com/JX	998	36.7	11	6.9	4.1	5.1	1.1	1.9	1.4	1.4	0.6	–	29.8	–	6.9
16–17 Jul	Mainichi/SSRC	1,031	34	8	15	4	3	3	5	4	1	1	1	20	1	14
16–17 Jul	ANN	1,008	45.1	7.5	10.1	4	3.4	2.6	2.3	0.9	0.6	0.5	1.3	14.8	6,9	30.3
11–12 Jul	Yomiuri/NNN	1,109	44	6	8	5	2	1	2	2	1	–	–	25	3	19
10 Jul	2022 House of Councillors election	52.05%	34.4	12.8	14.8	11.7	6.8	6.0	4.4	3.3	2.4	2.4	1.1	3.0	–	19.6
8 Jul	Assassination of Shinzo Abe															
2–3 Jul	JNN	1,198	35.4	6	4.5	3	3.4	0.6	1.7	–	0.6	0.4	0.8	37	6.6	1.6
1–3 Jul	NHK	2,035	35.6	5.8	5.4	4.8	4	1.4	0.5	–	0.3	0.5	1	31.3	9.5	4.3
24–26 Jun	NHK	2,049	35.6	6	4.8	4.6	2.6	1.3	0.5	–	0.7	0.2	1.4	33.7	8.5	1.9
22–23 Jun	Yomiuri/NNN	1,585	37	6	6	5	2	1	1	–	–	–	1	35	6	2
18–19 Jun	ANN	1,043	42.4	8.9	6.6	4.5	4.3	1.9	1.2	–	0.2	0.4	–	25.9	3.7	16.5
18 Jun	Mainichi/SSRC	995	34	7	13	6	6	3	3	–	1	2	–	20	5	14
17–19 Jun	NHK	2,035	38.4	5.1	3.7	4.3	2.7	0.8	0.4	–	0.5	0.3	0.7	34.1	8.8	4.3
17–19 Jun	Nikkei/TV Tokyo	912	45	7	8	4	3	2	1	–	–	–	1	25	3	20
11–13 Jun	Kyodo News	1,051	46.5	8.3	8	4.6	3.1	1.4	2.6	–	0.7	0.3	0.6	22	1.9	24.5
11–12 Jun	Senkyo.com/JX	983	35.5	10.7	5.7	4.9	6.1	1.6	0.6	–	0.3	0.2	–	34.4	–	1.1
10–13 Jun	Jiji Press	1,234	27.2	3.9	3.1	4.2	2.3	0.6	0.3	–	0.4	0.3	–	53.2	4.5	26
10–12 Jun	NHK	1,994	40.1	5.9	4.0	2.9	2.6	1.3	0.8	–	0.5	0.3	0.7	33.1	8.1	7
4–5 Jun	JNN	1,207	38	4.6	5	3.3	1.7	1.4	1.1	–	0.5	0.3	–	37.1	7	0.9
3–5 Jun	Yomiuri/NNN	1,485	43	4	5	3	2	1	1	–	–	–	–	38	3	5
27–29 May	Nikkei/TV Tokyo	935	51	7	6	3	2	2	–	–	–	–	–	23	6	28
21–22 May	ANN	1,035	49.3	6.8	6	3.3	3.5	2.4	1.7	–	0.5	–	–	24.8	1.7	24.5
21–22 May	Kyodo News	1,048	47.6	8.7	8.1	4.3	2.5	2.1	2	–	0.7	0.6	1.4	20.1	1.9	27.5
21 May	Mainichi/SSRC	1,041	37	8	11	3	4	3	3	–	–	1	–	28	2	9
13–16 May	Jiji Press	1,254	29.5	2.7	3	3.9	1.8	1	0.5	–	0.4	0.1	–	54.1	3	24.6
14–15 May	Senkyo.com/JX	995	32.0	11.7	7.1	4.6	5	1.4	1.1	–	0.4	–	–	36.8	–	4.8
13–15 May	Yomiuri/NNN	1,052	42	4	3	3	2	1	–	–	–	–	–	37	6	5
7–8 May	JNN	1,223	37.3	5.6	4.5	3.4	1.7	1.1	0.2	–	0.3	0.1	–	41.4	4.4	4.1
6–8 May	NHK	1,214	39.8	5	3.5	2.7	2.7	1.2	0.5	–	0.4	0.1	0.3	36.2	7.6	3.6
23 Apr	Mainichi/SSRC	1,018	35	7	10	3	4	4	2	–	1	1	–	31	2	4
22–24 Apr	Nikkei/TV Tokyo	905	48	7	7	3	3	2	1	–	1	–	–	26	2	22
16–17 Apr	Senkyo.com/JX	995	35.1	11.9	6.5	3.4	5.5	1.3	1.4	–	0.6	0	–	34.3	–	0.8
16–17 Apr	ANN	1,014	46	9.3	5.4	3.4	4.3	1.5	1	–	0.7	0.1	1.6	26.7	–	19.3
16–17 Apr	Kyodo News	1,067	46.1	8.5	9	3.4	3.4	1.6	1.8	–	0.3	2	0.9	20.1	2.9	26
8–10 Apr	NHK	1,235	38.9	5.2	3.6	3	2.5	1.5	0.2	–	0.4	–	0.6	36.7	7.5	2.2
1–3 Apr	Yomiuri/NNN	1,072	41	5	5	4	2	2	1	–	1	–	–	35	4	6
25–27 Mar	Nikkei/TV Tokyo	976	49	6	7	3	3	1	2	–	–	–	–	24	5	25
19–20 Mar	ANN	1,008	47.1	7.8	6.4	2.9	4.6	2.3	0.6	–	0.4	0.2	–	26.9	0.8	20.2
19–20 Mar	Kyodo News	1,053	47.3	9.4	13.4	3.6	3.1	2.7	2.5	–	0.3	0.5	0.6	14.3	2.3	33
19 Mar	Mainichi/SSRC	1,040	34	9	12	2	3	4	2	–	1	1	–	30	2	4
12–13 Mar	Senkyo.com/JX	1,001	34.7	12.9	8.8	3.7	4.4	1.4	0.6	–	0.6	0.1	–	32.9	–	1.8
11–14 Mar	Jiji Press	1,226	26.7	4.3	3.8	4.4	1.6	1.2	0.6	–	0.5	0.2	–	54	2.7	27.3
11–13 Mar	NHK	1,223	38.4	5.9	4.5	3.8	2.3	1	0.6	–	0.7	0.2	0.2	35.5	7	2.9
5–6 Mar	JNN	1,229	38.1	6.9	6.4	2.8	3.2	1.4	0.3	–	0.3	0.3	–	34.6	5.7	3.5
4–6 Mar	Yomiuri/NNN	1,063	40	5	7	4	3	2	–	–	–	–	–	36	3	4
25–27 Feb	Nikkei/TV Tokyo	992	46	7	8	4	2	2	2	–	–	–	–	26	3	20
19–20 Feb	Kyodo News	1,054	48.4	8	12.6	4	2.4	2.4	1.8	–	0.9	0.7	–	15.3	3.5	33.1
19–20 Feb	ANN	1,008	47.1	8.6	7	4	3	1.9	1.2	–	0.5	–	–	25.9	0.8	21.2
19 Feb	Mainichi/SSRC	1,050	35	8	16	3	4	4	3	–	1	1	–	25	–	10
12–13 Feb	Senkyo.com/JX	1,004	33.9	10.1	9.8	3.7	5.1	0.7	0.8	–	0.3	0.3	–	35.3	–	1.4
11–14 Feb	Jiji Press	1,256	26	4.8	3.8	3.5	1.3	1	0.5	–	0.2	–	–	57.4	1.5	31.4
11–13 Feb	NHK	1,240	41.5	7.3	5.2	3.5	2.2	1	0.6	–	0.3	0.1	0.3	31	6.9	10.5
5–6 Feb	JNN	1,205	39.3	5.2	7.3	2.7	2.1	1.6	0.6	–	0.1	0.2	–	37	3.9	2.3
4–6 Feb	Yomiuri/NNN	1,071	40	5	7	3	2	1	1	–	–	–	–	34	7	6
28–30 Jan	Nikkei/TV Tokyo	958	46	8	10	2	4	2	1	–	–	–	–	24	3	22
22–23 Jan	ANN	1,025	45.1	9.6	8.6	3.8	3.9	1.7	1	–	0.4	0.1	–	25.2	0.6	19.9
22–23 Jan	Kyodo News	1,059	44.2	13.1	12.5	4.1	3.8	2.5	1.6	–	0.8	1	0.6	14.3	1.5	29.9
22 Jan	Mainichi/SSRC	1,061	30	9	18	3	3	4	4	–	–	1	–	25	3	5
15–16 Jan	Senkyo.com/JX	~1,000	32.8	12.3	9.6	4.9	5.7	0.6	1.2	–	1	0.3	–	31.6	–	1.2
14–16 Jan	Yomiuri/NNN	1,057	41	5	6	3	2	2	–	–	–	–	–	35	6	6
8–10 Jan	NHK	1,219	41.1	5.4	5.8	2.8	2.6	1	0.3	–	0.2	–	0.3	34	6.3	7.1
7–10 Jan	Jiji Press	1,292	25.6	4	4.3	3	1.6	0.7	0.8	–	0.4	0.2	–	57.4	2	31.8
8–9 Jan	JNN	1,215	39.6	5.5	7.6	3.8	2	1.1	0.7	–	0.6	0.2	–	35.8	3.1	3.8
31 Oct 2021	2021 general election	55.97%	34.7	20.0	14.0	12.4	7.3	4.5	3.9	–	1.8	1.4	1.7	–	–	14.7

=== 2021 ===
Fieldwork date	Polling firm	Sample size	LDP	CDP	Ishin	Komei	JCP	DPFP	Reiwa	SDP	NHK	Others	No party	Und./ no ans.	Lead
24–26 Dec	Nikkei/TV Tokyo	947	43	10	13	4	4	2	–	–	–	–	20	3	23
18–19 Dec	Asahi	1,318	36	8	7	3	2	1	1	–	–	–	34	8	2
18–19 Dec	ANN	1,032	41	11.6	10.1	3.8	4	2.1	0.6	0.6	0.3	–	25.1	0.8	15.9
18–19 Dec	Kyodo News	1,065	43.8	11.6	12.5	3.4	4.3	2	1.6	0.8	0.2	0.5	17.9	1.4	25.9
18 Dec	Mainichi/SSRC	1,023	27	11	22	4	5	3	4	–	1	–	22	1	5
11–12 Dec	Senkyo.com/JX	~1,000	27.8	12.8	11.6	4.3	5.4	1.9	1.1	1.0	0.1	–	33.9	–	6.1
10–12 Dec	NHK	1,190	34.9	8.7	7.3	3.1	2.9	1.7	0.5	0.8	0.1	0.3	32.3	7.4	2.6
3–5 Dec	Yomiuri/NNN	1,088	41	7	8	3	2	1	1	–	–	1	32	4	9
20–21 Nov	ANN	1,031	42	11.4	11.1	4.6	4.3	1.2	0.8	0.4	0.3	–	23.5	0.4	18.5
13–14 Nov	Senkyo.com/JX	~1,000	31.1	11	9.6	5.4	7.6	1.6	1.1	1.4	0.2	–	31	–	0.1
10–11 Nov	Kyodo News	520	42.7	10.7	13	7.4	3.9	2.7	2.9	0.6	0.2	–	13.6	2.3	29.1
10–11 Nov	Nikkei/TV Tokyo	852	44	9	13	5	2	2	2	–	–	–	20	3	24
10 Nov	The Second Kishida Cabinet is formed.														
5–8 Nov	Jiji Press	1,270	27.2	5.4	4.7	3.5	1.8	0.8	0.6	0.4	0.1	–	53.1	2.4	25.9
6–7 Nov	JNN	1,225	35.9	9.3	9.8	4.9	3.1	1.9	1.6	0.3	0.5	–	29	3.7	6.9
5–7 Nov	NHK	1,208	39.5	8.2	7.3	4	2.1	1.2	0.6	0.2	0.2	0.5	28.6	7.8	10.9
1–2 Nov	Yomiuri/NNN	1,107	39	11	10	4	2	2	2	1	–	–	26	3	13
31 Oct 2021	2021 general election	55.97%	34.7	20.0	14.0	12.4	7.3	4.5	3.9	1.8	1.4	1.7	–	–	14.7

== Voting intention (party vote) ==
LOESS curve of the voter intention polling for the next Japanese general election with a 7-day average.

=== 2024 ===
Fieldwork date	Polling firm	Sample size	LDP	CDP	Ishin	Komei	JCP	DPFP	Reiwa	DIY	SDP	NHK	Others	None/Und.	No ans.	Lead
27 Oct	Election results	53.84%	26.7	21.2	9.4	10.9	6.2	11.3	7	3.4	1.7	0	2.1 (Note: Conservative Party of Japan: 2.1%)	–	–	5.5
19–20 Oct	Kyodo News	1,262	22.6	14.1	5.8	5.1	2.7	6.1	3.9	1.3	1.4	0.3	0.6	35.4 (Note: Undecided: 32.3%; None: 3.1%)	0.7	12.8
12–13 Oct	Senkyo.com/JX	982	30.8	23.4	8.7	3.9	7.6	3.5	2.6	0.6	1.6	0.2	3.7	13.4	–	7.4
11–14 Oct	Jiji Press	1,172	26.1	10.1	4.3	5.2										
11–12 Oct	Kyodo News	1,264	26.4	12.4	4.8	6.4	3.2	3.3	1.4	1.3	0.3	0.6	1.2	36.9 (Note: Undecided: 33.2%; None: 3.7%)	1.8	10.5
9 Oct	The House of Representatives is dissolved. A general election is called for 27 October 2024.															
5–6 Oct	JNN	1,019	35.6	18.8	7.6	4.9	3.4	2.6	2.5	1.5	0.4	–	5.7	17	–	16.8
5–6 Oct	ANN	1,024	31	14	3	3	5	2	1	1	–	–	2	39 (Note: Undecided/no answer: 36%; None: 3%)		8
1–2 Oct	Nikkei/TV Tokyo	784	40	15	8	4	2	2	4	1	–	1	2 (Note: Others: 1%; Free Education For All: 1%)	13	9	25
1–2 Oct	Kyodo News	1,102	38.4	16.5	7.8	3.6	3.8	3.5	2.2	1	0.9	0.5	3.8 (Note: Others: 2.7%; Free Education For All: 1.1%)	18	–	20.4
1–2 Oct	Asahi	1,178	36	16	9	5	3	4	2	2	–	–	3 (Note: Others: 2%; Free Education For All: 1%)	20	–	16
1–2 Oct	Yomiuri/NNN	1,095	39	12	7	4	3	2	4	1	1	–	2 (Note: Others: 1%; Free Education For All: 1%)	19	6	20
1 Oct	Shigeru Ishiba succeeds Fumio Kishida as Prime Minister of Japan. The Ishiba Cabinet is formed.															
21 Sep	SSRC	2,044	26	16	8	3	3	3	3	–	–	–	–	35	–	9
14–15 Sep	Senkyo.com/JX	992	33.6	23.3	6.9	4	7.6	1.9	2	1.2	0.5	0.4	2.2 (Note: Others: 2.1%; Free Education For All: 0.1%)	16.4	–	10.3
14–15 Sep	Sankei/FNN	1,012	33	12.3	6	3.7	2.9	1.6	1.9	1.4	0.2	0.2	1.9 (Note: Others: 1.7%; Free Education For All: 0.2%)	31.7	3.2	1.3
14–15 Sep	Asahi	1,070	37	16	9	4	3	3	3	1	–	–	2	22	–	15
13–15 Sep	Nikkei/TV Tokyo	902	42	12	6	3	3	3	4	1	1	–	1	14	10	28
13–15 Sep	Yomiuri/NNN	1,040	35	12	8	4	2	3	3	1	1	–	1 (Note: Free Education For All: 1%)	18	12	17
24–25 Sep	SSRC	1,752	25	14	8	3	3	4	3	1	–	–	1	37	–	12
24–25 Aug	Asahi	1,058	32	15	10	5	3	4	4	2	1	–	5 (Note: Others: 3%; Free Education For All: 2%)	19	–	13
23–25 Aug	Yomiuri/NNN	1,056	34	12	10	4	3	3	4	1	1	–	1	20	9	14
21–22 Aug	Nikkei/TV Tokyo	595	39	11	10	3	3	3	3	–	1	–	2 (Note: Others: 1%; Free Education For All: 1%)	17	9	22
17–19 Aug	Kyodo News	1,064	37.1	15.2	8.4	3.5	4.1	3	3.8	2.3	0.9	0.8	1.2 (Note: Others: 0.8%; Free Education For All: 0.4%)	19.7	–	17.4
17–18 Aug	Senkyo.com/JX	987	32	19.5	10.7	3.9	5.9	1.7	2.1	1.2	0.7	0.1	3.8 (Note: Others: 3.5%; Free Education For All: 0.3%)	18.3	–	12.5
14 Aug	Fumio Kishida announces he will not seek re-election as President of the LDP.															
26–28 Jul	Nikkei/TV Tokyo	792	30	13	11	5	4	3	3	1	1	–	1	18	9	12
20–21 Jul	SSRC	2,044	20	11	8	3	3	4	3	1	1	–	2	44	–	24
20–21 Jul	Kyodo News	1,035	30.5	14.6	9	4	3	5.9	3	0.4	1.2	0.2	3.3 (Note: Others: 2.1%; Free Education For All: 1.2%)	24.9	–	5.9
19–21 Jul	Yomiuri/NNN	1,031	27	12	11	4	3	3	4	1	1	–	2 (Note: Others: 1%; Free Education For All: 1%)	21	12	6
13–14 Jul	Senkyo.com/JX	987	24.8	18.8	10.8	4.7	10	2.5	2.1	1.2	1.4	0.2	3.6 (Note: Others: 3.4%; Free Education For All: 0.2%)	19.7	–	5.1
28–30 Jun	Nikkei/TV Tokyo	838	31	14	10	3	3	3	4	1	1	–	–	18	11	13
22–23 Jun	SSRC	2,043	17	17	9	3	4	4	3	1	1	–	2	40	–	23
22–23 Jun	Kyodo News	1,056	23.1	13.5	9.6	2.6	4.7	2.9	4.4	0.9	0.3	0.6	3.5 (Note: Others: 2%; Free Education For All: 1.5%)	33.9	–	10.8
21–23 Jun	Yomiuri/NNN	1,023	29	14	10	5	4	3	6	1	1	–	1	19	9	10
15–16 Jun	Senkyo.com/JX	984	22	23.7	10.1	4.3	9.1	2.7	3.8	0.7	1.5	0.2	3.6 (Note: Others: 3.5%; Free Education For All: 0.1%)	18.4	–	1.7
1–2 Jun	JNN	1,008	24.2	16.9	10.3	5.4	5.5	5.1	4	1.7	0.8	–	1.5 (Note: Others: 0.7%; Free Education For All: 0.8%)	24.6	–	0.4
24–26 May	Nikkei/TV Tokyo	813	24	16	13	6	4	3	5	2	1	–	1	16	9	8
17–19 May	Yomiuri/NNN	1,033	27	15	10	5	3	2	5	1	1	–	2 (Note: Others: 1%; Free Education For All: 1%)	20	9	7
11–13 May	Kyodo News	1,055	20.9	15.4	9.3	4.2	5.4	5	4	0.4	0.8	0.2	3 (Note: Others: 2.6%; Free Education For All: 0.4%)	31.4	–	10.5
11–12 May	Senkyo.com/JX	976	17.8	27.3	12.2	5.1	8.6	2	3.1	0.7	0.4	0.2	3.5 (Note: Others: 3.4%; Free Education For All: 0.1%)	19.1	–	8.2
29–30 Apr	Nikkei/TV Tokyo	876	28	18	9	5	3	3	4	2	–	1	1	18	8	10
28 Apr	2024 Japan by-elections															
19–21 Apr	Yomiuri/NNN	1,035	26	10	10	4	4	3	6	1	1	–	2 (Note: Others: 1%; Free Education For All: 1%)	24	8	2
13–14 Apr	Senkyo.com/JX	981	23.1	21.2	13	3.9	8.3	1.7	3.1	0.9	1.3	0.2	4 (Note: Others: 3.5%; Free Education For All: 0.5%)	19.3	–	1.9
22–24 Mar	Nikkei/TV Tokyo	925	28	14	13	3	4	4	5	1	1	–	1 (Note: Free Education For All: 1%)	17	9	11
16–17 Mar	SSRC	2,044	13	14	12	3	3	5	4	1	1	–	4 (Note: Others: 3%; Free Education For All: 1%)	41	–	27
16–17 Mar	Senkyo.com/JX	983	19.1	18.9	13.2	4.8	10.7	3.2	4.4	0.9	0.4	0	3.7 (Note: Others: 3.5%; Free Education For All: 0.2%)	20.8	–	1.7
23–25 Feb	Nikkei/TV Tokyo	867	26	12	11	7	3	5	5	1	1	1	1	20	8	6
17–18 Feb	SSRC	2,043	14	12	14	2	4	4	5	1	1	–	2	41	–	27
17–18 Feb	Senkyo.com/JX	991	20.3	20	13.6	5.2	9.1	2.3	3.8	0.9	1.2	0.1	3.2 (Note: Others: 3%; Free Education For All: 0.2%)	20.2	–	0.1
26–28 Jan	Nikkei/TV Tokyo	969	30	13	11	4	5	4	5	2	1	1	1 (Note: Free Education For All: 1%)	17	8	13
21 Jan	SSRC	2,052	18	12	11	3	4	3	4	1	1	–	2	38	–	20
13–14 Jan	Senkyo.com/JX	996	24.8	16.5	15.2	4.8	6.3	2.9	3.1	1.2	1.1	0.1	4.1 (Note: Others: 3.7%; Free Education For All: 0.4%)	19.9	–	4.9
31 Oct 2021	2021 general election	55.97%	34.7	20.0	14.0	12.4	7.3	4.5	3.9	–	1.8	1.4	1.7	–	–	14.7

=== 2023 ===
Fieldwork date	Polling firm	Sample size	LDP	CDP	Ishin	Komei	JCP	DPFP	Reiwa	DIY	SDP	NHK	Others	None/Und.	No ans.	Lead
16–17 Dec	Senkyo.com/JX	990	18.5	18.1	13.7	5.9	9.6	2.4	4.1	1.3	1.1	0.1	4.3 (Note: Others: 3.4%; Free Education For All: 0.9%)	20.8	–	2.3
15–16 Dec	Nikkei/TV Tokyo	729	27	13	16	3	3	3	5	2	1	–	1 (Note: Free Education For All: 1%)	16	10	11
8 Dec	Slush fund scandal															
3 Dec	SSRC	2,047	19	10	12	3	4	4	5	1	1	–	3 (Note: Others: 2%; Free Education For All: 1%)	38	–	19
24–26 Nov	Nikkei/TV Tokyo	869	33	12	12	4	3	3	4	2	1	–	1	16	9	17
11–12 Nov	Senkyo.com/JX	993	24.3	16.4	13.7	4.9	8.4	3.2	2.7	0.9	1.6	0.6	3.9	19.3	–	5
5 Nov	SSRC	1,511	19	10	14	3	3	5	5	1	1	–	3	37	–	18
27–29 Oct	Nikkei/TV Tokyo	852	29	10	13	5	4	5	4	2	–	–	–	17	11	12
14–15 Oct	Senkyo.com/JX	991	28.5	15.4	14.8	5.3	8.1	3.2	2.2	1.6	1.1	0.2	2.6	16.9	–	11.6
13–15 Oct	Yomiuri/NNN	1,022	33	7	12	6	3	2	2	1	–	–	–	26	6	7
1 Oct	SSRC	1,505	21	10	15	2	3	4	4	2	1	–	2	36	–	15
13–14 Sep	Kyodo News	1,046	33.8	10	13	6.4	3	4.6	3.9	1.5	0.3	0.4	2.5	20.6	–	13.2
13–14 Sep	Nikkei/TV Tokyo	749	37	9	16	4	4	5	5	2	–	–	1	9	8	21
13–14 Sep	Yomiuri/NNN	1,088	32	7	13	5	3	4	3	2	–	1	–	25	5	7
9–10 Sep	Senkyo.com/JX	995	26.2	16.3	15.1	5.4	6.7	2.8	3	1.3	1.9	0.5	3	17.7	–	8.5
3 Sep	SSRC	1,509	21	9	16	4	4	4	3	1	–	–	1	35	–	14
25–27 Aug	Nikkei/TV Tokyo	847	35	9	15	5	3	3	4	1	–	–	–	18	8	17
12–13 Aug	Senkyo.com/JX	997	25.5	15.6	17.1	4.4	8.9	2.4	3.3	1.7	0.8	0.6	2.1	17.6	–	7.9
6 Aug	SSRC	1,509	20	10	16	2	3	5	4	1	1	–	1	37	–	17
28–30 Jul	Nikkei/TV Tokyo	904	33	9	16	4	5	3	5	2	–	–	–	13	8	17
21–23 Jul	Yomiuri/NNN	1,052	34	8	15	4	3	3	4	2	–	–	–	19	7	15
15–16 Jul	Senkyo.com/JX	997	28.8	14.5	16.8	4	8.3	2	2.6	1.2	0.9	0.8	2.7	17.4	–	11.4
2 Jul	SSRC	1,501	21	10	15	3	3	4	3	1	1	–	1	35	–	14
23–25 Jun	Nikkei/TV Tokyo	913	34	11	14	3	3	3	5	3	1	1	–	14	8	20
23–25 Jun	Yomiuri/NNN	1,018	38	9	13	5	3	3	5	2	–	–	–	15	6	23
17–18 Jun	Senkyo.com/JX	993	28.5	14.6	16.2	6.4	8.1	2	1.7	1.6	0.9	0.8	2.2	16.9	–	11.6
17–18 Jun	Kyodo News	1,044	34.4	8.2	16.8	3.7	3.8	4.1	1.9	1.4	0.8	0.1	1.9	22.9	–	11.5
10–11 Jun	ANN	1,021	32.6	7.7	10.4	4.4	5.1	1.9	2.1	0.7	0.2	0.4	0.5	34 (Note: Undecided/no answer: 31.1%; Do not vote: 2.9%)		1.4
4 Jun	SSRC	1,502	21	9	15	3	4	4	3	1	1	1	1	37	–	16
26–28 May	Nikkei/TV Tokyo	928	36	10	16	3	3	2	3	2	1	1	–	14	9	20
20–21 May	Yomiuri/NNN	1,061	41	8	13	3	3	2	4	2	1	1	–	14	7	27
19–21 May	49th G7 summit in Hiroshima															
13–14 May	Senkyo.com/JX	1,000	30.2	14.3	18.8	4.4	6.3	3	3	1.6	0.9	1.1	3	13.4	–	11.4
15–16 Apr	Senkyo.com/JX	992	32.3	13.8	15.4	5.6	8.7	2.6	2	1.4	1.1	0.5	2.1	14.4	–	16.9
15 Apr	Attempted assassination of Fumio Kishida															
11–12 Mar	Senkyo.com/JX	994	31	17.3	12.2	5.3	7.6	1.9	2.4	1.8	1.3	0.2	3.2	15.7	–	13.7
11–12 Feb	Senkyo.com/JX	986	31.7	14.9	12.6	5.1	7.3	3.4	2	1.9	1.1	0.4	3.1	16.3	–	15.4
14–15 Jan	Senkyo.com/JX	996	28.3	17.4	11.9	5.2	7.7	2	2.3	1.1	0.9	0.6	3.1	19.4	–	8.9
31 Oct 2021	2021 general election	55.97%	34.7	20.0	14.0	12.4	7.3	4.5	3.9	–	1.8	1.4	1.7	–	–	14.7

=== 2022 ===
Fieldwork date	Polling firm	Sample size	LDP	CDP	Ishin	Komei	JCP	DPFP	Reiwa	DIY	SDP	NHK	Others	None/Und.	No ans.	Lead
17–18 Dec	Senkyo.com/JX	994	27.2	18.1	12.3	5.4	9.1	2.3	2.2	1.9	0.9	0.6	2.7	17.3	–	9.1
12–13 Nov	Senkyo.com/JX	995	27.7	19.6	12.6	4.1	8	2.3	2.2	1.5	1.2	0.4	3.6	16.7	–	8.1
15–16 Oct	Senkyo.com/JX	987	27.5	17.1	13.1	5.2	10.1	2.1	1.5	1.8	1	0.6	3.6	16.3	–	10.4
17–18 Sep	Senkyo.com/JX	997	25.8	17.3	14.5	5.5	7.5	2.4	2.9	1.4	1.7	0.6	2.8	17.6	–	8.2
13–14 Aug	Senkyo.com/JX	1,005	27.4	17.4	13.1	5.2	8.4	2.9	3.7	2.1	1.5	0.7	3.2	14.5	–	10
10 Jul	2022 House of Councillors election	52.05%	34.4	12.8	14.8	11.7	6.8	6.0	4.4	3.3	2.4	2.4	1.1	3.0	–	19.6
8 Jul	Assassination of Shinzo Abe															
22–23 Jun	Yomiuri/NNN	1,585	36	8	10	6	3	2	2	1	1	1	–	23	7	13
18–19 Jun	ANN	1,043	33.1	8.5	7.3	5.4	4.8	2	1.2	–	0.6	0.4	1.7	35 (Note: Undecided/no answer: 31%; Do not vote: 4%)		1.9
17–19 Jun	Nikkei/TV Tokyo	912	43	8	10	6	3	2	2	–	1	1	1	17	6	26
11–13 Jun	Kyodo News	1,051	39.7	9.7	9.9	5.8	3.7	1.8	1.7	–	0.8	0.3	1.1	25.5		14.2
11–12 Jun	Senkyo.com/JX	983	36.1	16	12.6	6.3	7.9	2.8	1.8	0.7	0.7	0.8	1.8 (Note: Happiness Realization Party: 0.2%; Kunimori Conservative Party: 0.2%; Ishin Seito Shimpu: 0%; First no Kai: 0.2%; Others: 1.2%)	12.3	–	20.1
3–5 Jun	Yomiuri/NNN	1,485	45	7	9	4	4	3	2	–	1	1	–	17	8	28
27–29 May	Nikkei/TV Tokyo	935	50	7	8	4	3	2	2	–	0	0	1	15	8	35
21–22 May	ANN	1,035	35.1	6.4	7.3	4.1	3.6	1.7	1.4	–	0.6	0.1	1.7	38 (Note: Undecided/no answer: 35.4%; Do not vote: 2.6%)		2.9
21–22 May	Kyodo News	1,048	44	10	8.7	4.7	3.5	2.4	1.9	–	0.2	0.6	1.5	22.5		21.5
13–16 May	Jiji Press	1,254	38.5	6.1	6.3	5.5	2.6	1.5	2	–	1	–	–	36.7	–	1.8
14–15 May	Senkyo.com/JX	995	34.5	17	14.8	6.5	6.8	2.9	1.7	–	1	0.5	1.5	12.7	–	17.5
13–15 May	Yomiuri/NNN	1,052	44	8	10	5	2	3	1	–	–	–	–	18	8	26
25 Apr	Asahi	1,892	43	14	17	5	4	3	2	–	1	–	–	11		26
16–17 Apr	Senkyo.com/JX	995	33.3	15.5	13.7	5.6	7.9	2.8	1.8	–	1.2	1.1	1.9	15.2	–	17.8
16–17 Apr	ANN	1,014	33.9	9.2	7.3	3.3	4.8	1.6	0.9	–	0.7	0	1.3	37 (Note: Undecided/no answer: 34.1%; Do not vote: 2.9%)		3.1
16–17 Apr	Kyodo News	1,067	41.9	8.7	10.9	4.6	3.6	1.4	1.6	–	0.3	1.6	0.7	24.7		17.2
8–11 Apr	Jiji Press	1,226	37.4	7	8.6	3.8	2.4	2.1	1.7	–	0.2	0.5	–	34.9	–	2.5
19–20 Mar	ANN	1,008	35.1	8.5	6.7	3.5	5.2	2.4	0.8	–	0.5	0.1	0.4	36.8 (Note: Undecided/no answer: 34.5%; Do not vote: 2.3%)		1.7
19–20 Mar	Kyodo News	1,053	42.1	9.5	13.3	3.8	3.7	2.5	2.2	–	0.4	0.7	1.1	20.7		21.4
12–13 Mar	Senkyo.com/JX	1,001	31.2	19.1	17.8	5.4	6	2.3	1.2	–	0.8	0.8	2.3	13.2	–	12.1
19–20 Feb	ANN	1,008	36.3	8.3	8.2	4.3	2.7	1.7	1.1	–	0.8	0.1	0.5	36 (Note: Undecided/no answer: 34%; Do not vote: 2%)		0.3
19–20 Feb	Kyodo News	1,054	42.7	9.2	13.5	4.2	2	3.1	2.4	–	0.7	0.8	1.5	19.9		22.8
12–13 Feb	Senkyo.com/JX	1,004	32.5	13.9	19.2	5.3	6.5	2.5	1.5	–	1	0.9	3.1	13.6	–	13.3
4–6 Feb	Yomiuri/NNN	1,071	41	9	14	4	3	2	2	–	1	1	–	18	6	23
22–23 Jan	ANN	1,025	33.8	9.8	9.3	3.7	4.5	1.7	1.2	–	0.5	0.2	0.1	35.2 (Note: Undecided/no answer: 32.3%; Do not vote: 2.9%)		1.4
22–23 Jan	Kyodo News	1,059	38.3	15.3	13.5	4.5	3.8	2.4	1.5	–	0.9	0.8	0.8	18.2		20.1
15–16 Jan	Senkyo.com/JX	~1,000	32.8	17.7	16.7	5.8	5.9	2	1.5	–	1.6	0.7	1.5	13.9	–	15.1
14–16 Jan	Yomiuri/NNN	1,057	42	9	14	4	3	3	1	–	1	–	–	16	6	26
31 Oct 2021	2021 general election	55.97%	34.7	20.0	14.0	12.4	7.3	4.5	3.9	–	1.8	1.4	1.7	–	–	14.7

=== 2021 ===
Fieldwork date	Polling firm	Sample size	LDP	CDP	Ishin	Komei	JCP	DPFP	Reiwa	SDP	NHK	Others	None/Und.	No ans.	Lead
11–12 Dec	Senkyo.com/JX	~1,000	25.2	18.3	22.9	5.5	6.3	3	2.4	0.9	1.4	1.6	12.6	–	2.3
13–14 Nov	Senkyo.com/JX	~1,000	30.2	17.3	18.4	6.2	8.6	2.9	1.5	1.1	1.1	1.7	11.1	–	11.8
31 Oct 2021	2021 general election	55.97%	34.7	20.0	14.0	12.4	7.3	4.5	3.9	1.8	1.4	1.7	–	–	14.7

== Voting intention (district vote) ==
=== 2024 ===
Fieldwork date	Polling firm	Sample size	LDP	Komei	CDP	Ishin	JCP	DPFP	Reiwa	DIY	SDP	NHK	Others	None/Und.	No ans.	Lead
19–20 Oct	Kyodo News	1,262	24.6		33.2								–	42.2		9
11–12 Oct	Kyodo News	1,264	28.5		22.9								–	46.6	2	20.1
3 Oct	Mainichi/SSRC	2,061	25		26								–	48	1	22

== Preferred outcome ==
=== 2024 ===
Fieldwork date	Polling firm	Sample size	LDP–Komei coalition	LDP–Komei–Ishin coalition	Close result	Change of regime	Und./ no ans.
19–20 Oct	Kyodo News	1,262	24.8	–	49.7	20.5	5
11–14 Oct	Jiji Press	1,172	45.3	–	–	27.5	27.2
11–12 Oct	Kyodo News	1,264	27.1 (Note: Clear government win: 27.1%)	–	50.7	15.1 (Note: Clear opposition win: 15.1%)	7.1
9 Oct	The House of Representatives is dissolved. A General election is called for 27 October 2024.						
5–6 Oct	JNN	1,019	49	–	–	37	14
5–6 Oct	Sankei/FNN	1,014	53.1	–	–	35.3	11.6
5–6 Oct	ANN	1,024	38	–	–	38	24
1–2 Oct	Asahi	1,178	48	–	–	23 (Note: CDP-led coalition: 23%)	29
1–2 Oct	Yomiuri/NNN	1,095	53	–	–	29	18
1 Oct	Shigeru Ishiba succeeds Fumio Kishida as Prime Minister of Japan. The Ishiba Cabinet is formed.						
21–22 Sep	ANN	1,012	42	–	–	41	18
21 Sep	SSRC	2,044	16	12	–	27 (Note: CDP-led coalition: 19%; Another regime: 8%)	43
14–15 Sep	Asahi	1,070	48	–	–	27 (Note: CDP-led coalition: 27%)	25
13–15 Sep	Yomiuri/NNN	1,040	48	–	–	36	16
7–8 Sep	JNN	1,011	44	–	–	37	19
24–25 Aug	SSRC	1,752	16	13	–	26 (Note: CDP-led coalition: 18%; Another regime: 8%)	44
24–25 Aug	ANN	1,015	42	–	–	40	17
23–25 Aug	Yomiuri/NNN	1,056	51	–	–	33	16
14 Aug	Fumio Kishida announces he will not seek re-election as President of the LDP.						
3–4 Aug	JNN	1,010	41	–	–	42	17
26–28 Jul	Nikkei/TV Tokyo	792	60 (Note: LDP-Komei coalition: 24%; LDP-Komei coalition with reduced majority: 36%)	–	–	27	13
20–21 Jul	Sankei/FNN	1,033	39.3	–	–	46	14.7
20–21 Jul	Kyodo News	1,035	21.9 (Note: Clear government win: 21.9%)	–	51.2	21.9 (Note: Clear opposition win: 21.9%)	5
20–21 Jul	SSRC	2,044	15	13	–	26 (Note: CDP-led coalition: 16%; Another regime: 10%)	46
19–21 Jul	Yomiuri/NNN	1,031	44	–	–	37	19
13–14 Jul	ANN	1,012	38	–	–	43	18
5–8 Jul	Jiji Press	1,160	36.3	–	–	39.3	24.4
6–7 Jul	JNN	1,021	38	–	–	47	15
28–30 Jun	Nikkei/TV Tokyo	838	61 (Note: LDP-Komei coalition: 21%; LDP-Komei coalition with reduced majority: 40%)	–	–	26	13
22–23 Jun	SSRC	2,043	13	13	–	30 (Note: CDP-led coalition: 21%; Another regime: 9%)	44
22–23 Jun	Mainichi	1,057	11	15	–	53 (Note: CDP-led coalition: 33%; Another regime: 20%)	21
21–23 Jun	Yomiuri/NNN	1,023	46	–	–	42	12
15–16 Jun	Sankei/FNN	1,013	43.7	–	–	43.9	12.4
15–16 Jun	ANN	1,026	34	–	–	49	17
1–2 Jun	JNN	1,008	39	–	–	48	13
24–26 May	Nikkei/TV Tokyo	813	60 (Note: LDP-Komei coalition: 19%; LDP-Komei coalition with reduced majority: 41%)	–	–	27	13
18–19 May	ANN	1,045	39	–	–	52	9
17–19 May	Yomiuri/NNN	1,033	42	–	–	42	16
10–13 May	Jiji Press	1,260	33.2	–	–	43.9	22.9
11–12 May	Senkyo.com/JX	976	21.1 (Note: Clear government win: 21.1%)	–	39.2	25.9 (Note: Clear opposition win: 25.9%)	13.8
4–5 May	JNN	1,013	34	–	–	48	18
29–30 Apr	Nikkei/TV Tokyo	876	63 (Note: LDP-Komei coalition: 20%; LDP-Komei coalition with reduced majority: 43%)	–	–	28	9
28 Apr	2024 Japan by-elections						
20–21 Apr	Mainichi	1,032	24	–	–	62	14
13–15 Apr	Kyodo News	1,049	17.7 (Note: Clear government win: 17.7%)	–	50.5	23.8 (Note: Clear opposition win: 23.8%)	8
30–31 Mar	JNN	1,036	32	–	–	42	26
16–17 Mar	ANN	1,031	38	–	–	46	17

== Seat projections ==
Color key: Exit poll

Seat projections from analysts (district seats + proportional representation)
Analysts	Publication/ Newspapers	Fieldwork date	LDP	CDP	Ishin	Komei	JCP	DPFP	Reiwa	DIY	SDP	CPJ	Ind./ Oth.	LDP Majority	Gov.	Opp.	Gov. Majority
Election results		27 Oct 2024	191 (132+59)	148 (104+44)	38 (23+15)	24 (4+20)	8 (1+7)	28 (11+17)	9 (0+9)	3 (0+3)	1 (1+0)	3 (1+2)	12 (12+0)	–42	215	250	–18
NHK		27 Oct 2024	153–219	128–191	28–45	21–35	7–10	20–33	6–14	0–4	1	1–4	9–17	–	174–254	200–319	–
JNN		27 Oct 2024	181	159	35	27	10	27	7	3	1	–	15	–52	208	257	–25
Kaoru Matsuda	Zakzak	24 Oct 2024	203 (144+59)	144 (99+45)	38 (19+19)	25 (6+19)	11 (1+10)	19 (6+13)	6 (0+6)	3 (0+3)	1 (1+0)	3 (1+2)	12 (12+0)	–30	228	237	–5
Masashi Kubota	Shūkan Bunshun	23 Oct 2024	197 (136+61)	153 (109+44)	42 (20+22)	25 (6+19)	12 (1+11)	11 (4+7)	6 (0+6)	2 (0+2)	1 (1+0)	5 (1+4)	11 (11+0)	–36	222	243	–11
Mainichi		22–23 Oct 2024	171–225	126–177	29–40	23–29	7–9	23–29	6–7	0–1	1	–	11–23 (Note: Others: 1–6; Independents: 10–17)	–	194–254	203–287	–
JNN		22–23 Oct 2024	~195	~138	<43	<32	<10	>11	–	–	1–2	>5	–	–	<227	~232	–
Sankei/FNN		19–20 Oct 2024	~196	~148	<43	~22	>10	~22	>3	–	–	–	–	–	~218	~247	–17
Asahi		19–20 Oct 2024	200 (Note: LDP-Independents: 5 (5+0)) (144+56)	138 (97+41)	38 (19+19)	25 (5+20)	12 (1+11)	21 (7+14)	11 (0+11)	2 (0+2)	1 (1+0)	–	17 (Note: Others: 3 (1+2); Independents: 14 (14+0)) (15+2)	–33	225	240	–8
Hiroshi Miura	BS11	18 Oct 2024	235 (170+65)	118 (77+41)	38 (13+25)	29 (8+21)	9 (0+9)	12 (5+7)	5 (0+5)	1 (0+1)	2 (1+1)	2 (1+1)	14 (14+0)	2	264	201	31
Masashi Kubota	Shūkan Bunshun	18 Oct 2024	204 (135+69)	145 (106+39)	45 (23+22)	28 (6+22)	11 (1+10)	11 (4+7)	6 (0+6)	1 (0+1)	1 (1+0)	–	13 (Note: Independents: 13 (13+0)) (13+0)	–29	232	233	–1
Yomiuri/NNN	Nikkei	15–16 Oct 2024	231 (Note: LDP-Independents: 5 (5+0)) (167+64)	130 (85+45)	32 (17+15)	30 (7+23)	12 (1+11)	12 (5+7)	6 (0+6)	1 (0+1)	2 (1+1)	4 (1+3)	5 (5+0)	–2	261	204	28
Mainichi/JNN		15–16 Oct 2024	203–250	117–163	28–34	24–29	5–6	13–20	6	0	1	–	12–14	–	227–279	182–244	–
Tadaoki Nogami	Nikkan Gendai	15 Oct 2024	202 (Note: LDP-Independents: 4 (4+0)) (148+54)	150 (99+51)	49 (21+28)	28 (8+20)	10 (1+9)	11 (4+7)	4 (0+4)	1 (0+1)	2 (1+1)	1 (0+1)	7 (7+0)	–31	230	235	–3
Hiroshi Miura	BS Prime News	15 Oct 2024	228–258	98–117	44–46	24–32	10	–	–	–	–	–	–	–	257	208	24
Masahiko Hisae	BS Prime News	15 Oct 2024	230	130	45	28	10	–	–	–	–	–	–	–3	258	207	25
Hiroshi Miura	Sports Hochi	14 Oct 2024	229	116	47	29	10	12	5	0	2	1	14	–4	258	207	25
Tadaoki Nogami	AERA (only district seats)	13 Oct 2024	153	91	23	6	0	5	0	0	1	1	9	–	159	130	–
Koichi Kakutani	AERA (only district seats)	13 Oct 2024	152	85	23	8	1	4	0	0	1	1	14	–	160	129	–
Kaoru Matsuda	Zakzak	9 Oct 2024	226 (165+61)	122 (79+43)	45 (19+26)	29 (8+21)	11 (1+10)	11 (4+7)	5 (0+5)	2 (0+2)	1 (1+0)	2 (1+1)	11 (11+0)	–7	255	210	22
Hiroshi Miura	Sunday Mainichi	8 Oct 2024	234 (166+68)	112 (74+38)	43 (17+26)	30 (9+21)	10 (1+9)	12 (5+7)	5 (0+5)	0 (0+0)	2 (1+1)	1 (1+0)	16 (Note: Free Education For All: 2 (1+1); Independents: 14 (14+0)) (15+1)	1	264	201	31
Tadaoki Nogami	Nikkan Gendai	6 Oct 2024	202 (147+55)	148 (97+51)	54 (26+28)	25 (5+20)	10 (1+9)	12 (5+7)	4 (0+4)	0 (0+0)	2 (1+1)	1 (0+1)	7 (7+0)	–31	227	238	–6
Masashi Kubota	Shūkan Bunshun	3 Oct 2024	219 (147+72)	131 (94+37)	50 (24+26)	25 (6+19)	10 (1+9)	11 (4+7)	6 (0+6)	0 (0+0)	1 (1+0)	–	12 (Note: Free Education For All: 1 (1+0); Independents: 11 (11+0)) (12+0)	–14	244	221	11
Kaoru Matsuda	Zakzak	27 May 2024	205 (149+56)	151 (102+49)	45 (20+25)	25 (5+20)	10 (1+9)	10 (5+5)	6 (0+6)	4 (0+4)	1 (1+0)	2 (0+2)	6 (Note: Free Education For All: 1 (1+0); Independents: 5 (5+0)) (6+0)	–28	230	235	–3
Tadaoki Nogami	Nikkan Gendai	5 May 2024	184 (133+51)	161 (114+47)	58 (25+33)	23 (3+20)	11 (1+10)	10 (5+5)	6 (0+6)	1 (0+1)	2 (1+1)	–	9 (Note: Free Education For All: 3 (1+2); Independents: 6 (6+0)) (7+2)	–49	207	258	–26
2021 general election		31 Oct 2021	259 (187+72)	96 (57+39)	41 (16+25)	32 (9+23)	10 (1+9)	11 (6+5)	3 (0+3)	–	1 (1+0)	–	12 (12+0)	26	291	174	58

== Preferred prime minister ==
=== After the LDP presidential election ===
Fieldwork date	Polling firm	Sample size	Ishiba LDP	Noda CDP	NOT/ UD/NA
19–20 Oct 2024	Kyodo News	1,262	47.2	29.5	23.3
11–12 Oct 2024	Kyodo News	1,264	47.2	24.3	28.5

=== After the call of LDP presidential election ===
LOESS curve of the polling for the 2024 LDP leadership election with a 7-day average since the election was called. Note that the approval ratings of Liberal Democratic Party Supporters are omitted from the graph.

(Figures in parentheses are approval ratings of Liberal Democratic Party supporters)

Fieldwork date	Polling firm	Sample size	Shigeru Ishiba	Sanae Takaichi	Shinjirō Koizumi	Yoshimasa Hayashi	Takayuki Kobayashi	Toshimitsu Motegi	Yōko Kamikawa	Taro Kono	Katsunobu Katō	Others	NOT/ UD/NA
27 Sep 2024	LDP presidential election	695,536	(29.12)	(29.30)	(16.63)	(7.50)	(5.10)	(3.75)	(4.73)	(2.15)	(1.72)	–	–
21–22 Sep 2024	ANN	1,012	31	15	20	3	3	2	5	5	1	–	15
21 Sep 2024	SSRC	2,044	26 (24)	17 (29)	14 (23)	3	3	1	5	4	1	–	26 (24)
20–21 Sep 2024	Nippon TV/JX	1,007	(31)	(28)	(14)	(5)	(6)	(2)	(6)	(2)	(1)	–	(5)
15–16 Sep 2024	Kyodo News	N/A	(23.7)	(27.7)	(19.1)	(6.3)	(5.2)	(1.8)	(5.1)	(3.8)	(1.7)	–	(5.6)
14–15 Sep 2024	go2senkyo/JX	992	31	16.7	17	4.5	3.1	1.7	7	3.6	0.6	–	14.6
14–15 Sep 2024	Sankei/FNN	1,012	25.6 (24.1)	12.5 (16.3)	21.9 (29.4)	3.5 (3.8)	3 (3.6)	1.6 (3)	5.5 (3.6)	4.6 (5.2)	0.2 (0.3)	–	21.6 (10.7)
14–15 Sep 2024	Yomiuri/NNN	1,500	(26)	(25)	(16)	(5)	(6)	(2)	(6)	(3)	(1)	–	(9)
14–15 Sep 2024	Asahi	1,070	32	17	24	4	3	1	3	3	0	–	13
13–15 Sep 2024	Yomiuri/NNN	1,040	27	13	21	2	2	2	5	6	1	–	20 (Note: None of these: 8%; Don't know: 12%)
13–15 Sep 2024	Nikkei/TV Tokyo	902	26	16	20	5	3	2	6	5	1	–	16
12 Sep 2024	Nippon TV/JX	1,022	(25)	(22)	(19)	(5)	(5)	(3)	(9)	(3)	(1)	–	(9)
12 Sep 2024	Nomination period closes. Official campaign period begins.												
7–8 Sep 2024	JNN	1,011	23.1 (24.1)	9.2 (11.7)	28.5 (34.5)	1.8 (2.8)	2.8 (2.6)	2.1 (2.9)	6.1 (5.9)	6.4 (6.7)	0.5 (0.8)	3.6 (2) (Note: Shigeharu Aoyama: 2,4% (0.9%); Ken Saitō: 0.6% (0.5%); Seiko Noda: 0.6% (0%))	15.9 (6)
6–9 Sep 2024	Jiji Press	1,170	24.2 (27.1)	8.5 (12.1)	25.5 (35.6)	1.4	2.9	1.4	2.1	4.9 (3.6)	0.3	–	27.8 (Note: None of these: 12.0%; Don't know: 15.8%)
6–8 Sep 2024	NHK	1,220	27.8	9.3	22.6	1.9	3.6	1.7	4.2	6.1	0.7	3.8 (Note: Shigeharu Aoyama: 2,4%; Seiko Noda: 1.4%)	18.3 (Note: None of these: 6.5%)
3–4 Sep 2024	Nippon TV/JX	1,019 (Note: Among members or allies of LDP.)	(28)	(17)	(18)	(4)	(5)	(2)	(7)	(3)	(2)	(4) (Note: Shigeharu Aoyama: (3%); Seiko Noda: (1%))	(10)
31 Aug – 1 Sep 2024	go2senkyo	1,000	16.5 (28.6)	7.5 (11.8)	11.6 (17.6)	0.7	1.3	0.7	2.9	4.3	0.2	3.7 (Note: Shigeharu Aoyama: 2.7%; Seiko Noda: 0.7%; Ken Saitō: 0.3%)	50.6
24–25 Aug 2024	SSRC	1,752	23	11	16	2	5	1	5	5	–	5 (Note: Others: 3%; Seiko Noda: 2%; Ken Saitō: 0%)	28
24–25 Aug 2024	Asahi	1,058	21	8	21	1	5	2	6	6	1	1 (Note: Seiko Noda: 1%)	28 (Note: None of these: 22%)
24–25 Aug 2024	ANN	1,015	27	9	23	1	6	1	6	6	–	1	19
24–25 Aug 2024	Mainichi	950	29	13	16	1	7	1	6	5	1	1 (Note: Ken Saitō: 1%)	20 (Note: None of these: 12%; Undecided and Don't know: 7%; No answer: 1%)
24–25 Aug 2024	Sankei/FNN	N/A	21.6	10.8	22.4	1.0	3.6	1.3	4.2	7.7	0.6	3.1 (Note: Shigeharu Aoyama: 1.6%; Seiko Noda: 1.3%; Ken Saitō: 0.2%)	23.7
23–25 Aug 2024	Yomiuri/NNN	1,056	22	10	20	1	5	2	6	7	1	1 (Note: Seiko Noda: 1%)	25 (Note: None of these: 10%)
21–22 Aug 2024	Nikkei/TV Tokyo	N/A	18	11	23	2	8	1	6	7	1	2 (Note: Seiko Noda: 1%; Ken Saitō: 1%)	–
17–19 Aug 2024	Kyodo News	1,064	25.3	10.1	19.6	–	3.7	–	7.6	9.7	–	–	–
17–18 Aug 2024	go2senkyo/JX	987	29.1	12.6	14.7	–	5.7	2.0	6.2	5.8	–	7.6 (Note: Seiko Noda: 2.4%; Others: 5.2%)	16.4

=== Before the call of LDP presidential election ===
LOESS curve of the polling for the 2024 LDP leadership election with a 7-day average.

Fieldwork date	Polling firm	Sample size	Shigeru Ishiba	Shinjirō Koizumi	Taro Kono	Sanae Takaichi	Yoshihide Suga	Yōko Kamikawa	Fumio Kishida	Seiko Noda	Toshimitsu Motegi	Yoshimasa Hayashi	Katsunobu Katō	Others	NOT/ UD/NA
19 Aug 2024	LDP presidential election is called for 27 September.														
14 Aug 2024	Fumio Kishida announces he will not seek re-election as President of the LDP.														
3–4 Aug 2024	JNN	1,010	23.1	14.5	7.1	7	4.8	6.9	6.4	0.7	0.9	0.4	0.8	0.8 (Note: Takayuki Kobayashi: 0.8%)	26.6
26–28 Jul 2024	Nikkei/TV Tokyo	792	24	15	5	8	5	6	6	2	1	2	–	4 (Note: Yūko Obuchi: 1%; Takayuki Kobayashi: 1%)	24
20–21 Jul 2024	Sankei/FNN	1,033	24.7	12.1	7.0	7.5	5.4	4.8	4.1	1.4	0.9	1.2	0.4	0.1 (Note: Takayuki Kobayashi: 0.1%)	30.4 (Note: None of these: 21.8%)
20–21 Jul 2024	Kyodo News	1,035	28.4	12.7	9	10.4	–	8.2	7.5	1.1	2.5	0.7	0.7	1.1 (Note: Takayuki Kobayashi: 0.7%; Another MP: 0.4%)	17.7
20–21 Jul 2024	SSRC	2,044	17	12	4	7	7	5	6	–	–	–	–	9 (Note: Another government politician: 2%; An opposition politician: 7%)	33
19–21 Jul 2024	Yomiuri/NNN	1,031	25	15	8	6	6	4	6	2	1	1	–	1 (Note: Takayuki Kobayashi: 1%)	25 (Note: None of these: 13%)
13–14 Jul 2024	ANN	1,012	27	18	6	6	4	6	4	2	1	–	1	1	24
6–7 Jul 2024	JNN	1,021	24	16.6	9.3	5.8	5.8	4.9	2.7	1.4	0.9	1.5	0.8	0.8 (Note: Takayuki Kobayashi: 0.8%)	25.5
22–23 Jun 2024	SSRC	2,043	18	11	5	5	7	5	5	–	–	–	–	9 (Note: Another government politician: 3%; An opposition politician: 6%)	35
22–23 Jun 2024	Mainichi	1,057	20	7	5	9	6	8	5	–	1	–	–	–	39
22–23 Jun 2024	Kyodo News	1,056	26.2	12.1	7.8	6.8	–	7.8	6.6	2.4	2.4	1	0.9	1.9	25.1
21–23 Jun 2024	Yomiuri/NNN	1,023	23	15	6	7	8	6	6	3	1	1	1	1 (Note: Takayuki Kobayashi: 1%)	22 (Note: None of these: 11%)
15–16 Jun 2024	Senkyo.com/JX	984	23.2	9.9	4.8	8.5	–	8.6	7.8	–	0.9	2.4	–	8	25.9
15–16 Jun 2024	Sankei/FNN	1,013	16.4	14.6	8.4	6.3	5.8	5.6	4.3	0.9	0.4	0.4	0.3	1.7 (Note: Kenta Izumi (CDP): 1.7%)	35.3 (Note: None of these: 27.7%)
15–16 Jun 2024	ANN	1,026	23	18	8	6	5	7	3	3	1	–	–	1	25
18–19 May 2024	ANN	1,045	23	18	7	6	5	9	4	1	1	–	–	1	25
17–19 May 2024	Yomiuri/NNN	1,033	22	16	10	7	6	7	4	1	2	2	–	2 (Note: Yūko Obuchi: 2%)	21 (Note: None of these: 11%)
4–5 May 2024	JNN	1,013	24.2	14.1	8.4	6.1	7	7.8	4.5	1.8	0.3	0.9	1.4	8.2	15.3
13–14 Apr 2024	ANN	1,037	21	18	8	6	5	9	5	2	1	–	–	1	24
22–24 Mar 2024	Yomiuri/NNN	1,020	22	15	8	5	6	9	7	1	1	1	–	2 (Note: Yūko Obuchi: 2%)	23 (Note: None of these: 15%)
16–17 Mar 2024	ANN	1,031	22	18	9	6	5	11	4	2	1	–	–	1	21
16–17 Mar 2024	SSRC	2,044	17	11	6	6	6	8	3	–	–	–	–	8 (Note: Another government politician: 2%; An opposition politician: 6%)	35
8–11 Mar 2024	Jiji Press	1,160	18.6	12.1	6.4	4.7	5.7	5.9	2.3	0.9	0.4	1.1	0.1	1.4 (Note: Yūko Obuchi: 0.7%; Yasutoshi Nishimura: 0.4%; Kōichi Hagiuda: 0.3%)	40.4
9–10 Mar 2024	Kyodo News	1,043	22.2	15.4	7.9	8.3	–	10.8	4.9	1.8	0.9	0.5	–	2.8 (Note: Yasutoshi Nishimura: 0.3%; Another MP: 2.5%)	24.5
24–25 Feb 2024	ANN	1,034	23	17	9	6	4	11	2	3	1	–	–	1 (Note: Yasutoshi Nishimura: 1%)	34
17–18 Feb 2024	SSRC	2,043	17	10	7	6	7	10	3	–	–	–	–	7 (Note: Another government politician: 2%; An opposition politician: 5%)	33
17–18 Feb 2024	Mainichi	1,024	25	9	7	9	–	12	1	2	1	–	–	–	34
16–18 Feb 2024	Yomiuri/NNN	1,083	21	17	10	6	4	8	4	2	2	–	–	2 (Note: Yūko Obuchi: 2%)	12
26–28 Jan 2024	Nikkei/TV Tokyo	969	22	15	10	7	7	5	3	2	2	3	–	3 (Note: Yūko Obuchi: 2%; Another MP: 1%)	17
21 Jan 2024	SSRC	2,052	17	12	7	7	9	5	4	–	–	–	5	3 (Note: Taro Yamamoto (Reiwa): 3%)	32
20–21 Jan 2024	ANN	1,007	23	19	9	7	6	5	4	2	1	–	–	2 (Note: Yasutoshi Nishimura: 1%; Another MP: 1%)	24
16–17 Dec 2023	ANN	1,011	23	19	11	7	4	6	3	1	1	–	–	2 (Note: Yasutoshi Nishimura: 1%; Another MP: 1%)	23
16–17 Dec 2023	Kyodo News	1,018	25.7	15.9	13.2	6.2	–	5.9	5.2	2.4	1.3	3.9	–	2.7 (Note: Yasutoshi Nishimura: 1.2%; Another MP: 1.5%)	17.6
15–17 Dec 2023	Yomiuri/NNN	1,069	20	17	12	7	8	4	4	2	2	2	–	1 (Note: Yūko Obuchi: 1%)	23 (Note: None of these: 11%; No answer: 12%)
15–16 Dec 2023	Nikkei/TV Tokyo	729	21	19	12	7	5	4	3	1	1	3	–	1 (Note: Yūko Obuchi: 1%; Another MP: 0%)	23
8–11 Dec 2023	Jiji Press	2,000	15	16	8.8	5	6.2	3.1	1.6	–	–	–	–	1	40.3
25–26 Nov 2023	ANN	1,015	17	19	13	7	6	4	4	2	1	–	–	1 (Note: Yasutoshi Nishimura: 1%; Another MP: 0%)	26
24–26 Nov 2023	Nikkei/TV Tokyo	869	16	15	13	9	5	2	4	2	1	3	–	3 (Note: Yūko Obuchi: 2%; Kōichi Hagiuda: 1%)	26
18–19 Nov 2023	Asahi	1,086	15	16	13	8	–	–	7	–	1	1	–	–	36
11–12 Nov 2023	Sankei/FNN	N/A	18.2	16	11.9	5.4	4.2	4.3	2.5	–	–	–	–	5.2	32.3
3–5 Nov 2023	Kyodo News	1,040	20.2	14.1	14.2	10	–	–	5.7	3.1	2.3	2.4	–	5.8 (Note: Yūko Obuchi: 2.3%; Yasutoshi Nishimura: 2.1%; Another MP: 1.4%)	22.2
23–24 Sep 2023	ANN	1,018	18	15	14	5	7	–	5	3	3	–	–	3 (Note: Yasutoshi Nishimura: 2%; Another MP: 1%)	22
19–20 Aug 2023	Kyodo News	1,049	18.5	11.9	13.5	7	–	–	10.2	1.6	2	3.7	–	3 (Note: Yasutoshi Nishimura: 1.4%; Another MP: 1.6%)	28.6
8–9 Jul 2023	ANN	1,023	15	16	13	5	10	–	10	2	–	–	–	3 (Note: Yasutoshi Nishimura: 2%; Another MP: 1%)	27
4 Jun 2023	SSRC	1,502	4	4	9	4	4	–	19	–	–	–	–	7 (Note: Taro Yamamoto (Reiwa): 2%; Hirofumi Yoshimura (Ishin): 2%; Tōru Hashimoto (Ishin): 1%; Yuriko Koike (Ind.): 1%; Yuichiro Tamaki (DPFP): 1%)	49
3–4 Dec 2022	JNN	1,227	11	–	19	5	7	–	6	2	2	1	–	–	39
19–20 Nov 2022	Mainichi/SSRC	3,069	5.9	4	14.7	4.7	4.4	–	15.8	–	–	–	–	6.4 (Note: Tōru Hashimoto (Ishin): 2.1%; Hirofumi Yoshimura (Ishin): 1.9%; Taro Yamamoto (Reiwa): 1.4%)	17
17–18 Sep 2022	SSRC	642	5.1	2.1	13.6	5.1	3.4	–	10.3	–	–	–	–	8 (Note: Tōru Hashimoto (Ishin): 4.7%; Taro Yamamoto (Reiwa): 3.3%)	20.9

== Cabinet approval/disapproval ratings ==

=== 2024 ===
Fieldwork date	Polling firm	Sample size	Prime Minister	Approve	Disapprove	Und. / no answer	Lead
19–20 Oct	Asahi	N/A	Shigeru Ishiba	33	39	28	6
19–20 Oct	Kyodo News	1,262	Shigeru Ishiba	41.4	40.4	18.2	1
18–20 Oct	NHK	2,524	Shigeru Ishiba	41.3	35.3	23.4	6
12–14 Oct	NHK	2,515	Shigeru Ishiba	44.2	32.2	23.6	12
12–13 Oct	Senkyo.com/JX	982	Shigeru Ishiba	42.9 (Note: Strongly approve: 13%; Approve on balance: 29.9%)	29.5 (Note: Disapprove on balance: 12.3%; Completely disapprove: 17.2%)	27.5	13.4
11–14 Oct	Jiji Press	1,172	Shigeru Ishiba	28	30.1	41.9	11.8
11–12 Oct	Kyodo News	1,264	Shigeru Ishiba	42	36.7	21.3	5.3
9 Oct	The House of Representatives is dissolved. A general election is called for 27 October 2024.						
5–6 Oct	JNN	1,019	Shigeru Ishiba	51.6	46.5	1.9	5.1
5–6 Oct	Sankei/FNN	1,014	Shigeru Ishiba	53.3	35.8	10.9	17.5
5–6 Oct	ANN	1,024	Shigeru Ishiba	42.3	32.3	25.4	10
3 Oct	Mainichi/SSRC	2,061	Shigeru Ishiba	46	37	16	9
1–2 Oct	Nikkei/TV Tokyo	784	Shigeru Ishiba	51	37	12	14
1–2 Oct	Kyodo News	1,102	Shigeru Ishiba	50.7	28.9	20.4	21.8
1–2 Oct	Asahi	1,178	Shigeru Ishiba	46	30	24	16
1–2 Oct	Yomiuri/NNN	1,095	Shigeru Ishiba	51	32	17	19
1 Oct	Shigeru Ishiba succeeds Fumio Kishida as Prime Minister of Japan. The Ishiba Cabinet is formed.						
25 Sep – 1 Oct	Morning Consult	N/A	Fumio Kishida	21.3	59.4	19.3	38.1
21–22 Sep	ANN	1,012	Fumio Kishida	25.7	56.8	17.4	31.1
21 Sep	SSRC	2,044	Fumio Kishida	20	65	16	45
14–15 Sep	Senkyo.com/JX	992	Fumio Kishida	21.1 (Note: Strongly approve: 4.8%; Approve on balance: 16.3%)	50.3 (Note: Disapprove on balance: 23.4%; Completely disapprove: 26.9%)	28.5	21.8
14–15 Sep	Sankei/FNN	1,012	Fumio Kishida	25.7	69.1	5.2	43.4
13–15 Sep	Yomiuri/NNN	1,040	Fumio Kishida	25	63	11	38
13–15 Sep	Nikkei/TV Tokyo	902	Fumio Kishida	27	65	8	38
7–8 Sep	JNN	1,011	Fumio Kishida	34.3	60.6	5.1	26.3
6–9 Sep	Jiji Press	1,170	Fumio Kishida	18.7	57.5	23.8	33.7
6–8 Sep	NHK	1,220	Fumio Kishida	20.2	59.9	19.9	39.7
24–25 Aug	SSRC	1,752	Fumio Kishida	19	67	14	48
24–25 Aug	Mainichi	950	Fumio Kishida	23	71	6	48
24–25 Aug	Asahi	1,058	Fumio Kishida	23	62	15	39
24–25 Aug	ANN	1,015	Fumio Kishida	20.3	62.5	17.2	42.2
24–25 Aug	Sankei/FNN	N/A	Fumio Kishida	26.1	70.1	3.8	44
23–25 Aug	Yomiuri/NNN	1,056	Fumio Kishida	24	63	13	39
21–22 Aug	Nikkei/TV Tokyo	595	Fumio Kishida	28	66	7	38
17–19 Aug	Kyodo News	1,064	Fumio Kishida	26.1	67.4	6.5	41.3
17–18 Aug	Senkyo.com/JX	987	Fumio Kishida	24.7 (Note: Strongly approve: 6.9%; Approve on balance: 17.8%)	49.1 (Note: Disapprove on balance: 18.9%; Completely disapprove: 30.2%)	26.2	24.4
14 Aug	Fumio Kishida announces he will not seek re-election as President of the LDP.						
5 Aug	Nikkei 225 decline						
3–4 Aug	JNN	1,010	Fumio Kishida	31	66.4	2.6	35.4
2–4 Aug	NHK	1,199	Fumio Kishida	24.9	55.1	20	30.2
26–28 Jul	Nikkei/TV Tokyo	792	Fumio Kishida	28	64	8	36
20–21 Jul	Sankei/FNN	1,033	Fumio Kishida	25.1	68.9	6	43.8
20–21 Jul	Kyodo News	1,035	Fumio Kishida	24.6	60.7	14.7	36.1
20–21 Jul	Mainichi	1,020	Fumio Kishida	21	73	6	52
20–21 Jul	Asahi	1,035	Fumio Kishida	26	61	13	35
20–21 Jul	SSRC	2,044	Fumio Kishida	19	66	15	47
19–21 Jul	Yomiuri/NNN	1,031	Fumio Kishida	25	62	13	37
13–14 Jul	Senkyo.com/JX	987	Fumio Kishida	20 (Note: Strongly approve: 4.9%; Approve on balance: 15.1%)	54.8 (Note: Disapprove on balance: 20.7%; Completely disapprove: 34.1%)	25.2	29.6
13–14 Jul	ANN	1,012	Fumio Kishida	20.2	61.4	18.4	41.2
5–8 Jul	Jiji Press	1,160	Fumio Kishida	15.5	58.4	26.1	32.3
6–7 Jul	JNN	1,021	Fumio Kishida	26.9	71.5	1.6	44.6
5–7 Jul	NHK	1,211	Fumio Kishida	24.9	56.8	18.2	31.9
28–30 Jun	Nikkei/TV Tokyo	838	Fumio Kishida	25	67	8	42
22–23 Jun	SSRC	2,043	Fumio Kishida	17	71	12	54
22–23 Jun	Mainichi	1,057	Fumio Kishida	17	77	6	60
22–23 Jun	Kyodo News	1,056	Fumio Kishida	22.2	62.4	15.4	40.2
21–23 Jun	Yomiuri/NNN	1,023	Fumio Kishida	23	64	13	41
15–16 Jun	Senkyo.com/JX	984	Fumio Kishida	19.4 (Note: Strongly approve: 4.5%; Approve on balance: 14.9%)	58.1 (Note: Disapprove on balance: 20.1%; Completely disapprove: 38%)	22.5	35.6
15–16 Jun	Sankei/FNN	1,013	Fumio Kishida	31.2	64.4	4.4	33.2
15–16 Jun	ANN	1,026	Fumio Kishida	19.1	62.4	18.5	43.3
7–10 Jun	Jiji Press	1,240	Fumio Kishida	16.4	57	26.6	30.4
7–9 Jun	NHK	1,192	Fumio Kishida	21.4	60.2	18.4	38.8
30 May – 5 Jun	Morning Consult	N/A	Fumio Kishida	13	72	15	57
1–2 Jun	JNN	1,008	Fumio Kishida	25.1	71.6	3.3	46.5
24–26 May	Nikkei/TV Tokyo	813	Fumio Kishida	28	67	5	39
18–19 May	ANN	1,045	Fumio Kishida	20.7	60.8	18.5	40.1
18–19 May	Mainichi	1,093	Fumio Kishida	20	74	6	54
17–19 May	Yomiuri/NNN	1,033	Fumio Kishida	26	63	11	37
11–13 May	Kyodo News	1,055	Fumio Kishida	24.2	62.6	13.2	38.4
10–13 May	Jiji Press	1,260	Fumio Kishida	19	56	25	31
11–12 May	Senkyo.com/JX	976	Fumio Kishida	19.8 (Note: Strongly approve: 4.6%; Approve on balance: 15.2%)	58.3 (Note: Disapprove on balance: 21%; Completely disapprove: 37.3%)	21.9	36.4
10–12 May	NHK	1,202	Fumio Kishida	23.9	54.6	21.5	30.7
1–7 May	Morning Consult	N/A	Fumio Kishida	15	71	14	56
4–5 May	JNN	1,013	Fumio Kishida	29.8	67.9	2.3	38.1
29–30 Apr	Nikkei/TV Tokyo	876	Fumio Kishida	26	69	5	43
28 Apr	2024 Japan by-elections						
20–21 Apr	Mainichi	1,032	Fumio Kishida	22	74	4	52
19–21 Apr	Yomiuri/NNN	1,035	Fumio Kishida	25	66	9	41
13–15 Apr	Kyodo News	1,049	Fumio Kishida	23.8	62.1	14.1	38.3
13–14 Apr	Senkyo.com/JX	981	Fumio Kishida	25.7 (Note: Strongly approve: 5.6%; Approve on balance: 20.1%)	50.4 (Note: Disapprove on balance: 18.5%; Completely disapprove: 31.9%)	23.9	24.7
13–14 Apr	ANN	1,037	Fumio Kishida	26.3	51.7	22	25.4
5–8 Apr	Jiji Press	1,200	Fumio Kishida	16.6	59.4	24	35.4
5–7 Apr	NHK	1,204	Fumio Kishida	23	58.2	18.8	35.2
28 Mar – 3 Apr	Morning Consult	N/A	Fumio Kishida	16	70	14	54
30–31 Mar	JNN	1,036	Fumio Kishida	22.8	75	2.2	52.2
22–24 Mar	Nikkei/TV Tokyo	925	Fumio Kishida	26	66	8	40
22–24 Mar	Yomiuri/NNN	1,020	Fumio Kishida	25	62	13	37
16–17 Mar	Senkyo.com/JX	983	Fumio Kishida	23.6 (Note: Strongly approve: 4.7%; Approve on balance: 18.9%)	58.8 (Note: Disapprove on balance: 20.4%; Completely disapprove: 38.4%)	17.6	35.2
16–17 Mar	ANN	1,031	Fumio Kishida	20.9	61.1	18	40.2
16–17 Mar	SSRC	2,044	Fumio Kishida	16	73	11	57
16–17 Mar	Mainichi	997	Fumio Kishida	17	77	6	60
16–17 Mar	Asahi	1,065	Fumio Kishida	22	67	11	45
8–11 Mar	Jiji Press	1,160	Fumio Kishida	18	57.4	24.6	39.4
9–10 Mar	Kyodo News	1,043	Fumio Kishida	20.1	64.4	15.5	44.3
8–10 Mar	NHK	1,206	Fumio Kishida	24.9	57	18.1	32.1
24–25 Feb	ANN	1,034	Fumio Kishida	20.6	59.7	19.7	39.1
23–25 Feb	Nikkei/TV Tokyo	867	Fumio Kishida	25	67	8	42
17–18 Feb	Mainichi	1,024	Fumio Kishida	14	82	4	68
17–18 Feb	SSRC	2,043	Fumio Kishida	14	74	12	60
17–18 Feb	Senkyo.com/JX	991	Fumio Kishida	19.5 (Note: Strongly approve: 5%; Approve on balance: 14.5%)	59.7 (Note: Disapprove on balance: 20%; Completely disapprove: 39.7%)	20.8	38.9
16–18 Feb	Yomiuri/NNN	1,083	Fumio Kishida	24	61	15	37
10–12 Feb	NHK	1,215	Fumio Kishida	25.1	58.2	16.7	33.1
9–12 Feb	Jiji Press	1,180	Fumio Kishida	16.9	60.4	22.7	37.7
3–4 Feb	Kyodo News	1,055	Fumio Kishida	24.5	58.9	16.6	34.4
27–28 Jan	Mainichi	1,049	Fumio Kishida	21	72	7	51
26–28 Jan	Nikkei/TV Tokyo	969	Fumio Kishida	27	66	7	39
21 Jan	SSRC	2,052	Fumio Kishida	19	70	11	51
20–21 Jan	ANN	1,007	Fumio Kishida	20.4	61.3	18.3	40.9
19–21 Jan	Yomiuri/NNN	1,074	Fumio Kishida	24	61	15	37
19 Jan	Dissolution of Kōchikai, Shisuikai and Seiwakai factions of the LDP.						
13–14 Jan	Senkyo.com/JX	987	Fumio Kishida	28.3 (Note: Strongly approve: 6.5%; Approve on balance: 21.8%)	42.6 (Note: Disapprove on balance: 21.4%; Completely disapprove: 21.2%)	29.1	13.5
13–14 Jan	Kyodo News	1,056	Fumio Kishida	27.3	57.5	15.2	30.2
12–14 Jan	NHK	1,212	Fumio Kishida	26.4	55.5	18.1	29.1
6–7 Jan	JNN	1,209	Fumio Kishida	27.1	70.4	2.5	42.9
1 Jan	2024 Noto earthquake						

=== 2023 ===
Fieldwork date	Polling firm	Sample size	Prime Minister	Approve	Disapprove	Und. / no answer	Lead
16–17 Dec	Mainichi	1,080	Fumio Kishida	16	79	5	63
16–17 Dec	Senkyo.com/JX	990	Fumio Kishida	17.5 (Note: Strongly approve: 5.4%; Approve on balance: 12.1%)	60.8 (Note: Disapprove on balance: 20.9%; Completely disapprove: 39.9%)	21.7	39.1
16–17 Dec	ANN	1,011	Fumio Kishida	21.3	60.4	18.3	39.1
16–17 Dec	Kyodo News	1,018	Fumio Kishida	22.3	65.4	12.3	43.1
15–17 Dec	Yomiuri/NNN	1,069	Fumio Kishida	25	63	12	38
15–16 Dec	Nikkei/TV Tokyo	729	Fumio Kishida	26	68	6	42
8–11 Dec	Jiji Press	1,188	Fumio Kishida	17.1	58.2	24.7	33.5
8–10 Dec	NHK	1,212	Fumio Kishida	23.2	57.5	19.3	34.3
6–12 Dec	Morning Consult	N/A	Fumio Kishida	16	73	11	57
8 Dec	Slush fund scandal						
3 Dec	SSRC	2,047	Fumio Kishida	17	71	11	54
2–3 Dec	JNN	1,213	Fumio Kishida	28.9	68	3.1	39.1
25–26 Nov	ANN	1,015	Fumio Kishida	26.1	54.2	19.7	28.1
24–26 Nov	Nikkei/TV Tokyo	869	Fumio Kishida	30	62	8	32
15–21 Nov	Morning Consult	N/A	Fumio Kishida	16	71	13	55
18–19 Nov	Asahi	1,086	Fumio Kishida	25	65	10	40
18–19 Nov	Mainichi	1,032	Fumio Kishida	21	74	5	53
17–19 Nov	Yomiuri/NNN	1,067	Fumio Kishida	24	62	14	38
11–12 Nov	Senkyo.com/JX	993	Fumio Kishida	23.4 (Note: Strongly approve: 5.4%; Approve on balance: 18%)	48.8 (Note: Disapprove on balance: 19.9%; Completely disapprove: 28.9%)	27.7	21.1
10–12 Nov	NHK	1,224	Fumio Kishida	29	52	19	23
5 Nov	SSRC	1,511	Fumio Kishida	19	67	14	48
3–5 Nov	Kyodo News	1,040	Fumio Kishida	28.3	56.7	15	28.4
28–29 Oct	ANN	1,019	Fumio Kishida	26.9	51.8	21.3	24.9
27–29 Oct	Nikkei/TV Tokyo	852	Fumio Kishida	33	59	8	26
14–15 Oct	Mainichi	1,030	Fumio Kishida	25	68	7	43
14–15 Oct	Senkyo.com/JX	991	Fumio Kishida	27.3 (Note: Strongly approve: 6.1%; Approve on balance: 21.2%)	42.5 (Note: Disapprove on balance: 15.6%; Completely disapprove: 26.9%)	30.2	12.3
14–15 Oct	Kyodo News	1,026	Fumio Kishida	32.3	52.5	15.2	20.2
13–15 Oct	Yomiuri/NNN	1,022	Fumio Kishida	34	49	17	15
6–9 Oct	Jiji Press	1,176	Fumio Kishida	26.3	46.3	27.4	18.9
7–9 Oct	NHK	1,219	Fumio Kishida	36.3	43.6	20.2	7.3
1 Oct	SSRC	1,505	Fumio Kishida	23	64	13	41
30 Sep – 1 Oct	JNN	1,208	Fumio Kishida	39.6	57.8	2.6	18.2
23–24 Sep	ANN	1,018	Fumio Kishida	30.7	48.3	21	17.6
16–17 Sep	Mainichi	1,030	Fumio Kishida	25	68	7	43
13–14 Sep	Kyodo News	1,046	Fumio Kishida	39.8	39.7	20.5	0.1
13–14 Sep	Nikkei/TV Tokyo	749	Fumio Kishida	42	51	6	9
13–14 Sep	Yomiuri/NNN	1,088	Fumio Kishida	35	50	15	15
13 Sep	Second Reshuffle of Kishida Cabinet						
9–10 Sep	Senkyo.com/JX	995	Fumio Kishida	30.2 (Note: Strongly approve: 7.1%; Approve on balance: 23.1%)	41 (Note: Disapprove on balance: 15.6%; Completely disapprove: 25.4%)	28.7	10.8
8–10 Sep	NHK	1,236	Fumio Kishida	36.3	43	20.6	6.7
3 Sep	SSRC	1,509	Fumio Kishida	25	63	12	38
2–3 Sep	JNN	1,219	Fumio Kishida	38.7	58.1	3.2	19.4
30 Aug – 5 Sep	Morning Consult	N/A	Fumio Kishida	25	63	12	38
26–27 Aug	Mainichi	1,039	Fumio Kishida	26	68	6	42
25–27 Aug	Nikkei/TV Tokyo	847	Fumio Kishida	42	50	8	8
25–27 Aug	Yomiuri/NNN	1,033	Fumio Kishida	35	50	15	15
19–20 Aug	Kyodo News	1,049	Fumio Kishida	33.6	50	16.4	16.4
19–20 Aug	ANN	1,010	Fumio Kishida	33.4	45.9	20.7	12.5
16–22 Aug	Morning Consult	N/A	Fumio Kishida	23	63	14	40
12–13 Aug	Senkyo.com/JX	997	Fumio Kishida	25.4 (Note: Strongly approve: 4.8%; Approve on balance: 20.6%)	45.3 (Note: Disapprove on balance: 20.2%; Completely disapprove: 25.1%)	29.4	15.9
11–13 Aug	NHK	1,223	Fumio Kishida	33.4	44.8	21.7	11.4
9–15 Aug	Morning Consult	N/A	Fumio Kishida	23	64	13	41
6 Aug	SSRC	1,509	Fumio Kishida	22	66	11	44
5–6 Aug	JNN	1,206	Fumio Kishida	37.1	58.7	4.2	21.6
26 Jul – 1 Aug	Morning Consult	N/A	Fumio Kishida	23	65	12	42
28–30 Jul	Nikkei/TV Tokyo	904	Fumio Kishida	40	51	9	11
22–23 Jul	Mainichi	1,022	Fumio Kishida	28	65	7	37
21–23 Jul	Yomiuri/NNN	1,052	Fumio Kishida	35	52	13	17
15–16 Jul	Senkyo.com/JX	997	Fumio Kishida	30.1 (Note: Strongly approve: 7.6%; Approve on balance: 22.5%)	41.6 (Note: Disapprove on balance: 16.8%; Completely disapprove: 24.8%)	28.4	11.5
14–16 Jul	Kyodo News	1,034	Fumio Kishida	34.3	48.6	17.1	15
12–18 Jul	Morning Consult	N/A	Fumio Kishida	25	62	13	37
8–9 Jul	ANN	1,023	Fumio Kishida	34.5	42.5	23	8
7–10 Jul	Jiji Press	1,184	Fumio Kishida	30.8	39.3	29.9	8.5
7–9 Jul	NHK	1,218	Fumio Kishida	38.2	40.6	21.3	2.4
5–11 Jul	Morning Consult	N/A	Fumio Kishida	27	60	13	33
2 Jul	SSRC	1,501	Fumio Kishida	26	59	15	33
23–25 Jun	Nikkei/TV Tokyo	913	Fumio Kishida	39	51	10	12
23–25 Jun	Yomiuri/NNN	1,018	Fumio Kishida	41	44	15	3
17–18 Jun	Kyodo News	1,044	Fumio Kishida	40.8	41.6	17.6	0.8
17–18 Jun	Mainichi	1,029	Fumio Kishida	33	58	9	25
17–18 Jun	Senkyo.com/JX	993	Fumio Kishida	34.2 (Note: Strongly approve: 7.5%; Approve on balance: 26.7%)	38.7 (Note: Disapprove on balance: 17.7%; Completely disapprove: 21%)	27.1	4.5
14–20 Jun	Morning Consult	N/A	Fumio Kishida	25	60	15	35
10–11 Jun	ANN	1,021	Fumio Kishida	36.9	37.7	25.4	0.8
9–11 Jun	NHK	1,208	Fumio Kishida	43	37.2	19.9	5.8
4 Jun	SSRC	1,502	Fumio Kishida	31	54	15	23
3–4 Jun	JNN	1,202	Fumio Kishida	46.7	48.3	5	1.6
24–30 May	Morning Consult	N/A	Fumio Kishida	34	53	13	19
27–28 May	Asahi	1,130	Fumio Kishida	46	42	12	4
27–28 May	Kyodo News	1,052	Fumio Kishida	47	35.9	17.1	11.1
26–28 May	Nikkei/TV Tokyo	928	Fumio Kishida	47	44	9	3
20–21 May	Yomiuri/NNN	1,061	Fumio Kishida	56	33	11	23
20–21 May	Mainichi	1,053	Fumio Kishida	45	46	9	1
19–21 May	49th G7 summit in Hiroshima						
13–14 May	Senkyo.com/JX	1,000	Fumio Kishida	37 (Note: Strongly approve: 7.8%; Approve on balance: 29.2%)	32.9 (Note: Disapprove on balance: 16.8%; Completely disapprove: 16.1%)	30.1	4.1
13–14 May	ANN	1,028	Fumio Kishida	41.3	33.6	25.1	7.7
12–15 May	Jiji Press	1,228	Fumio Kishida	38.2	31.8	30	6.4
12–14 May	NHK	1,225	Fumio Kishida	46.4	30.9	22.7	15.5
10–16 May	Morning Consult	N/A	Fumio Kishida	31	54	15	23
29–30 Apr	Kyodo News	1,046	Fumio Kishida	46.6	35.5	17.9	11.1
28–30 Apr	Nikkei/TV Tokyo	816	Fumio Kishida	52	40	8	12
15–16 Apr	Senkyo.com/JX	992	Fumio Kishida	37 (Note: Strongly approve: 9.5%; Approve on balance: 27.5%)	32.7 (Note: Disapprove on balance: 14.7%; Completely disapprove: 18%)	30.2	4.3
15–16 Apr	ANN	1,054	Fumio Kishida	45.3	34.6	20.2	10.7
14–16 Apr	Yomiuri/NNN	1,071	Fumio Kishida	47	37	17	10
15 Apr	Attempted assassination of Fumio Kishida						
7–9 Apr	NHK	1,232	Fumio Kishida	42	35.2	22.8	6.8
24–26 Mar	Nikkei/TV Tokyo	927	Fumio Kishida	48	44	7	4
18–19 Mar	ANN	1,008	Fumio Kishida	35.1	39	25.9	3.9
18–19 Mar	Asahi	1,304	Fumio Kishida	40	50	10	10
18–19 Mar	Mainichi	1,034	Fumio Kishida	33	59	8	26
17–19 Mar	Yomiuri/NNN	1,001	Fumio Kishida	42	43	15	1
15–21 Mar	Morning Consult	N/A	Fumio Kishida	24	62	14	38
11–13 Mar	Kyodo News	1,057	Fumio Kishida	38.1	43.5	18.4	5.4
11–12 Mar	Senkyo.com/JX	994	Fumio Kishida	30.8 (Note: Strongly approve: 7.3%; Approve on balance: 23.5%)	42.4 (Note: Disapprove on balance: 20.3%; Completely disapprove: 22.1%)	26.7	11.6
10–13 Mar	Jiji Press	1,198	Fumio Kishida	29.9	40.9	29.2	11
10–12 Mar	NHK	1,227	Fumio Kishida	41.4	40.2	18.4	1.2
5 Mar	SSRC	3,072	Fumio Kishida	25	61	14	36
24–26 Feb	Nikkei/TV Tokyo	819	Fumio Kishida	43	49	8	6
18–19 Feb	ANN	1,011	Fumio Kishida	29.5	44.8	25.7	15.3
17–19 Feb	Yomiuri/NNN	1,044	Fumio Kishida	41	47	12	6
15–21 Feb	Morning Consult	N/A	Fumio Kishida	24	63	13	39
11–13 Feb	Kyodo News	1,060	Fumio Kishida	33.6	47.7	18.7	14.1
11–12 Feb	Senkyo.com/JX	986	Fumio Kishida	28.1 (Note: Strongly approve: 6.3%; Approve on balance: 21.8%)	43.3 (Note: Disapprove on balance: 18.4%; Completely disapprove: 24.9%)	28.6	14.7
10–12 Feb	NHK	1,229	Fumio Kishida	35.7	40.9	23.4	5.2
5 Feb	SSRC	3,076	Fumio Kishida	23	65	12	42
4–5 Feb	JNN	1,167	Fumio Kishida	35.5	62.2	2.3	26.7
28–29 Jan	Kyodo News	1,044	Fumio Kishida	33.4	49.9	16.7	16.5
27–29 Jan	Nikkei/TV Tokyo	940	Fumio Kishida	39	54	7	15
21–22 Jan	Mainichi	1,059	Fumio Kishida	27	66	7	39
21–22 Jan	ANN	1,024	Fumio Kishida	28.1	47.5	24.4	19.4
13–16 Jan	Jiji Press	1,210	Fumio Kishida	26.5	43.6	29.9	13.7
14–15 Jan	Senkyo.com/JX	996	Fumio Kishida	28.3 (Note: Strongly approve: 6.5%; Approve on balance: 21.8%)	42.6 (Note: Disapprove on balance: 18.4%; Completely disapprove: 24.9%)	29.1	13.5
13–15 Jan	Yomiuri/NNN	1,072	Fumio Kishida	39	47	14	8
7–9 Jan	NHK	1,250	Fumio Kishida	32.7	44.7	22.6	12
8 Jan	SSRC	3,069	Fumio Kishida	25	63	12	38
7–8 Jan	JNN	1,225	Fumio Kishida	37.4	59.4	3.2	22
4–10 Jan	Morning Consult	N/A	Fumio Kishida	23	64	13	41

=== 2022 ===
Fieldwork date	Polling firm	Sample size	Prime Minister	Approve	Disapprove	Und. / no answer	Lead
23–25 Dec	Nikkei/TV Tokyo	947	Fumio Kishida	35	57	8	22
17–18 Dec	Senkyo.com/JX	994	Fumio Kishida	28.1 (Note: Strongly approve: 5.5%; Approve on balance: 22.6%)	46.7 (Note: Disapprove on balance: 20.6%; Completely disapprove: 26.1%)	25.2	18.6
17–18 Dec	Kyodo News	1,051	Fumio Kishida	33.1	51.5	15.4	18.4
17–18 Dec	ANN	1,015	Fumio Kishida	31.1	43.3	25.6	12.2
17–18 Dec	SSRC	3,061	Fumio Kishida	24	64	12	40
7–13 Dec	Morning Consult	N/A	Fumio Kishida	24	62	14	38
9–12 Dec	Jiji Press	1,228	Fumio Kishida	29.2	42.5	28.3	13.3
9–11 Dec	NHK	1,234	Fumio Kishida	36.3	43.5	20.2	7.2
3–4 Dec	JNN	1,227	Fumio Kishida	34.2	61.9	3.9	27.7
2–4 Dec	Yomiuri/NNN	1,069	Fumio Kishida	39	52	9	13
26–27 Nov	Kyodo News	1,035	Fumio Kishida	33.1	51.6	15.3	18.5
25–27 Nov	Nikkei/TV Tokyo	1,030	Fumio Kishida	37	55	8	18
19–20 Nov	SSRC	3,069	Fumio Kishida	27	59	14	32
19–20 Nov	ANN	1,021	Fumio Kishida	30.5	44.7	24.8	14.2
11–14 Nov	Jiji Press	1,234	Fumio Kishida	27.7	43.5	28.8	14.7
12–13 Nov	Asahi	1,365	Fumio Kishida	37	51	12	14
12–13 Nov	Senkyo.com/JX	995	Fumio Kishida	23.9 (Note: Strongly approve: 5.5%; Approve on balance: 18.4%)	49.5 (Note: Disapprove on balance: 21.8%; Completely disapprove: 27.7%)	26.5	23
11–13 Nov	NHK	1,236	Fumio Kishida	32.6	46	21.4	13.4
9–15 Nov	Morning Consult	N/A	Fumio Kishida	22	63	15	41
5–6 Nov	JNN	1,213	Fumio Kishida	39.6	57.7	2.7	18.1
4–6 Nov	Yomiuri/NNN	1,049	Fumio Kishida	36	50	14	14
29–30 Oct	Kyodo News	1,049	Fumio Kishida	37.6	44.8	17.6	7.2
28–30 Oct	Nikkei/TV Tokyo	929	Fumio Kishida	42	49	9	7
22–23 Oct	SSRC	3,072	Fumio Kishida	26	62	13	36
15–16 Oct	Senkyo.com/JX	987	Fumio Kishida	27.4 (Note: Strongly approve: 6.7%; Approve on balance: 20.7%)	44.7 (Note: Disapprove on balance: 20%; Completely disapprove: 24.7%)	28	16.7
15–16 Oct	ANN	1,058	Fumio Kishida	33.1	40.9	26	7.8
12–18 Oct	Morning Consult	N/A	Fumio Kishida	24	62	14	38
8–10 Oct	NHK	1,247	Fumio Kishida	37.5	43	19.5	5.5
8–9 Oct	Kyodo News	1,067	Fumio Kishida	35	48.3	16.7	13.3
7–10 Oct	Jiji Press	1,266	Fumio Kishida	27.4	43.9	28.7	15.2
5–11 Oct	Morning Consult	N/A	Fumio Kishida	24	62	14	38
1–2 Oct	Yomiuri/NNN	1,089	Fumio Kishida	45	46	9	1
17–18 Sep	Senkyo.com/JX	997	Fumio Kishida	29.5 (Note: Strongly approve: 6.4%; Approve on balance: 23.1%)	41.7 (Note: Disapprove on balance: 20%; Completely disapprove: 21.7%)	28.9	12.2
17–18 Sep	Kyodo News	1,049	Fumio Kishida	40.2	46.5	13.3	6.3
17–18 Sep	ANN	1,013	Fumio Kishida	36.3	40.9	22.8	4.6
17–18 Sep	Mainichi/SSRC	1,064	Fumio Kishida	29	64	7	35
16–18 Sep	Nikkei/TV Tokyo	957	Fumio Kishida	43	49	8	6
10–11 Sep	Asahi	1,462	Fumio Kishida	41	47	12	6
9–12 Sep	Jiji Press	1,238	Fumio Kishida	32.3	40	27.7	7.7
9–11 Sep	NHK	1,255	Fumio Kishida	40.4	40.1	19.5	0.3
7–13 Sep	Morning Consult	N/A	Fumio Kishida	28	59	13	31
3–4 Sep	JNN	1,218	Fumio Kishida	48.1	48.3	3.6	0,2
2–4 Sep	Yomiuri/NNN	1,075	Fumio Kishida	50	41	9	9
27–28 Aug	Asahi	998	Fumio Kishida	47	39	14	8
20–21 Aug	Mainichi/SSRC	965	Fumio Kishida	36	54	10	18
20–21 Aug	ANN	1,016	Fumio Kishida	43.7	32.7	23.6	11
13–14 Aug	Senkyo.com/JX	1,005	Fumio Kishida	35.4 (Note: Strongly approve: 8.8%; Approve on balance: 26.6%)	34.8 (Note: Disapprove on balance: 20%; Completely disapprove: 21.7%)	29.9	0.6
10–11 Aug	Kyodo News	1,052	Fumio Kishida	54.1	28.2	17.7	25.9
10–11 Aug	Nikkei/TV Tokyo	907	Fumio Kishida	57	35	8	22
10–11 Aug	Yomiuri/NNN	1,095	Fumio Kishida	51	34	14	17
10 Aug	First Reshuffle of Kishida Cabinet						
5–8 Aug	Jiji Press	1,200	Fumio Kishida	44.3	28.5	27.2	15.8
6–7 Aug	JNN	1,162	Fumio Kishida	57.5	39.3	3.2	18.2
5–7 Aug	Yomiuri/NNN	1,035	Fumio Kishida	57	32	11	25
5–7 Aug	NHK	1,223	Fumio Kishida	46.4	27.9	25.8	18.5
30–31 Jul	Kyodo News	1,050	Fumio Kishida	51	29.5	19.5	21.5
29–31 Jul	Nikkei/TV Tokyo	985	Fumio Kishida	58	32	10	26
16–18 Jul	NHK	1,216	Fumio Kishida	59.4	21.1	19.6	38.3
16–17 Jul	Senkyo.com/JX	998	Fumio Kishida	49.6 (Note: Strongly approve: 13.9%; Approve on balance: 35.7%)	22.3 (Note: Disapprove on balance: 12.3%; Completely disapprove: 10%)	28.1	21.5
16–17 Jul	Mainichi/SSRC	1,031	Fumio Kishida	52	37	11	15
16–17 Jul	ANN	1,008	Fumio Kishida	53.6	22.7	23.7	30.9
15–18 Jul	Jiji Press	1,224	Fumio Kishida	49.9	20	30.1	29.9
11–12 Jul	Yomiuri/NNN	1,109	Fumio Kishida	65	24	11	41
10 Jul	2022 Japanese House of Councillors election						
8 Jul	Assassination of Shinzo Abe						
2–3 Jul	JNN	1,198	Fumio Kishida	60.4	34.7	4.9	25.7
1–3 Jul	NHK	2,035	Fumio Kishida	53.5	26.6	19.9	26.9
24–26 Jun	NHK	2,049	Fumio Kishida	50.2	26.6	23.1	23.6
22–23 Jun	Yomiuri/NNN	1,585	Fumio Kishida	57	28	15	29
18 Jun	Mainichi/SSRC	995	Fumio Kishida	48	44	8	4
18–19 Jun	ANN	1,043	Fumio Kishida	49	26.7	24.3	22.3
17–19 Jun	NHK	2,035	Fumio Kishida	54.7	24.8	20.5	29.9
17–19 Jun	Nikkei/TV Tokyo	912	Fumio Kishida	60	32	8	28
14–21 Jun	Morning Consult	N/A	Fumio Kishida	41	41	18	0
11–13 Jun	Kyodo News	1,051	Fumio Kishida	56.9	26.9	16.2	30
11–12 Jun	Senkyo.com/JX	983	Fumio Kishida	47.9 (Note: Strongly approve: 12.5%; Approve on balance: 35.4%)	22.6 (Note: Disapprove on balance: 12.7%; Completely disapprove: 9.9%)	29.5	18.4
10–13 Jun	Jiji Press	1,234	Fumio Kishida	48.7	22	29.3	19.4
10–12 Jun	NHK	1,994	Fumio Kishida	58.8	23.1	18.1	35.7
8–14 Jun	Morning Consult	N/A	Fumio Kishida	42	42	16	0
4–5 Jun	JNN	1,207	Fumio Kishida	64.5	31.6	3.9	32.9
3–5 Jun	Yomiuri/NNN	1,485	Fumio Kishida	64	26	10	38
27–29 May	Nikkei/TV Tokyo	935	Fumio Kishida	66	23	11	43
21–22 May	ANN	1,035	Fumio Kishida	51	22	27	24
21–22 May	Kyodo News	1,048	Fumio Kishida	61.5	21.8	16.7	39.7
21 May	Mainichi/SSRC	1,041	Fumio Kishida	53	37	10	16
13–16 May	Jiji Press	1,254	Fumio Kishida	50.8	19.2	30	20.8
14–15 May	Senkyo.com/JX	995	Fumio Kishida	48.8 (Note: Strongly approve: 12.3%; Approve on balance: 36.5%)	18.2 (Note: Disapprove on balance: 9.8%; Completely disapprove: 8.4%)	32.9	15.9
13–15 May	Yomiuri/NNN	1,052	Fumio Kishida	63	23	14	40
6–8 May	NHK	1,214	Fumio Kishida	55.4	22.5	22.2	32.9
23 Apr	Mainichi/SSRC	1,018	Fumio Kishida	50	34	16	16
22–24 Apr	Nikkei/TV Tokyo	905	Fumio Kishida	64	27	9	37
16–17 Apr	Senkyo.com/JX	995	Fumio Kishida	45.6 (Note: Strongly approve: 9.9%; Approve on balance: 35.7%)	22.1 (Note: Disapprove on balance: 12.3%; Completely disapprove: 9.8%)	32.3	13.3
16–17 Apr	ANN	1,014	Fumio Kishida	51.9	21.7	26.4	25.5
16–17 Apr	Kyodo News	1,067	Fumio Kishida	58.7	23.1	18.2	35.6
8–10 Apr	NHK	1,235	Fumio Kishida	53	22.7	24.3	28.7
1–3 Apr	Yomiuri/NNN	1,072	Fumio Kishida	59	29	12	30
25–27 Mar	Nikkei/TV Tokyo	976	Fumio Kishida	61	27	12	34
19–20 Mar	ANN	1,008	Fumio Kishida	47.8	26.3	25.9	21.5
19–20 Mar	Kyodo News	1,053	Fumio Kishida	60.1	21.9	18	38.2
19 Mar	Mainichi/SSRC	1,040	Fumio Kishida	48	38	14	10
12–13 Mar	Senkyo.com/JX	1,001	Fumio Kishida	42.5 (Note: Strongly approve: 10.7%; Approve on balance: 31.8%)	22.7 (Note: Disapprove on balance: 12.9%; Completely disapprove: 9.8%)	34.9	7.6
11–14 Mar	Jiji Press	1,226	Fumio Kishida	50.2	21.1	28.7	21.5
11–13 Mar	NHK	1,223	Fumio Kishida	53.1	25.2	21.7	27.9
4–6 Mar	Yomiuri/NNN	1,063	Fumio Kishida	57	28	15	29
25–27 Feb	Nikkei/TV Tokyo	992	Fumio Kishida	55	31	14	24
19–20 Feb	Kyodo News	1,054	Fumio Kishida	56.6	27.4	16	29.2
19–20 Feb	ANN	1,008	Fumio Kishida	46.5	25.1	28.4	18.1
19 Feb	Mainichi/SSRC	1,050	Fumio Kishida	45	46	9	1
12–13 Feb	Senkyo.com/JX	1,004	Fumio Kishida	38.6 (Note: Strongly approve: 7.8%; Approve on balance: 30.8%)	27.5 (Note: Disapprove on balance: 15%; Completely disapprove: 12.5%)	33.9	4.7
11–14 Feb	Jiji Press	1,256	Fumio Kishida	43.4	25.3	31.3	12.1
11–13 Feb	NHK	1,240	Fumio Kishida	53.5	27.3	19.2	26.2
4–6 Feb	Yomiuri/NNN	1,071	Fumio Kishida	58	28	14	30
28–30 Jan	Nikkei/TV Tokyo	958	Fumio Kishida	59	30	11	29
22–23 Jan	ANN	1,025	Fumio Kishida	51.5	23.2	25.3	26.2
22–23 Jan	Kyodo News	1,059	Fumio Kishida	55.9	25.2	18.9	30.7
22 Jan	Mainichi/SSRC	1,061	Fumio Kishida	52	36	12	16
15–16 Jan	Senkyo.com/JX	~1,000	Fumio Kishida	49.2 (Note: Strongly approve: 11.8%; Approve on balance: 37.4%)	17.6 (Note: Disapprove on balance: 9%; Completely disapprove: 8.6%)	33.2	16
14–16 Jan	Yomiuri/NNN	1,057	Fumio Kishida	66	22	12	44
8–10 Jan	NHK	1,219	Fumio Kishida	56.8	20	23.1	33.7
7–10 Jan	Jiji Press	1,292	Fumio Kishida	51.7	18.7	29.6	22.1

=== 2021 ===
Fieldwork date	Polling firm	Sample size	Prime Minister	Approve	Disapprove	Und. / no answer	Lead
24–26 Dec	Nikkei/TV Tokyo	947	Fumio Kishida	65	26	9	39
18–19 Dec	Asahi	1,318	Fumio Kishida	49	23	28	21
18–19 Dec	ANN	1,032	Fumio Kishida	51.3	24.7	24	26.6
18–19 Dec	Kyodo News	1,065	Fumio Kishida	60	22.7	17.3	37.3
18 Dec	Mainichi/SSRC	1,023	Fumio Kishida	54	36	10	18
11–12 Dec	Senkyo.com/JX	~1,000	Fumio Kishida	38.6 (Note: Strongly approve: 9.3%; Approve on balance: 29.3%)	28 (Note: Disapprove on balance: 14.8%; Completely disapprove: 13.2%)	33.4	5.2
10–12 Dec	NHK	1,190	Fumio Kishida	50.3	26.1	23.5	24.2
3–5 Dec	Yomiuri/NNN	1,088	Fumio Kishida	62	22	16	40
20–21 Nov	ANN	1,031	Fumio Kishida	45.5	26.1	28.4	17.1
13–14 Nov	Senkyo.com/JX	~1,000	Fumio Kishida	43 (Note: Strongly approve: 11.2%; Approve on balance: 31.8%)	26.1 (Note: Disapprove on balance: 13.1%; Completely disapprove: 13%)	30.9	12.1
10–11 Nov	Kyodo News	1,040	Fumio Kishida	60.5	23	16.5	37.5
10–11 Nov	Nikkei/TV Tokyo	852	Fumio Kishida	61	27	12	34
10 Nov	The Second Kishida Cabinet is formed.						
5–8 Nov	Jiji Press	1,270	Fumio Kishida	47.1	21.3	31.6	15.5
5–7 Nov	NHK	1,208	Fumio Kishida	52.8	25.3	21.9	27.5
1–2 Nov	Yomiuri/NNN	1,107	Fumio Kishida	56	29	15	27

== See also ==
- Opinion polling for the 2026 Japanese general election
- Opinion polling for the 2021 Japanese general election
