= Sophia Fukuoka Junior and Senior High School =

Coordinates: 33°34′19″N 130°23′10″E

- 上智福岡中学高等学校

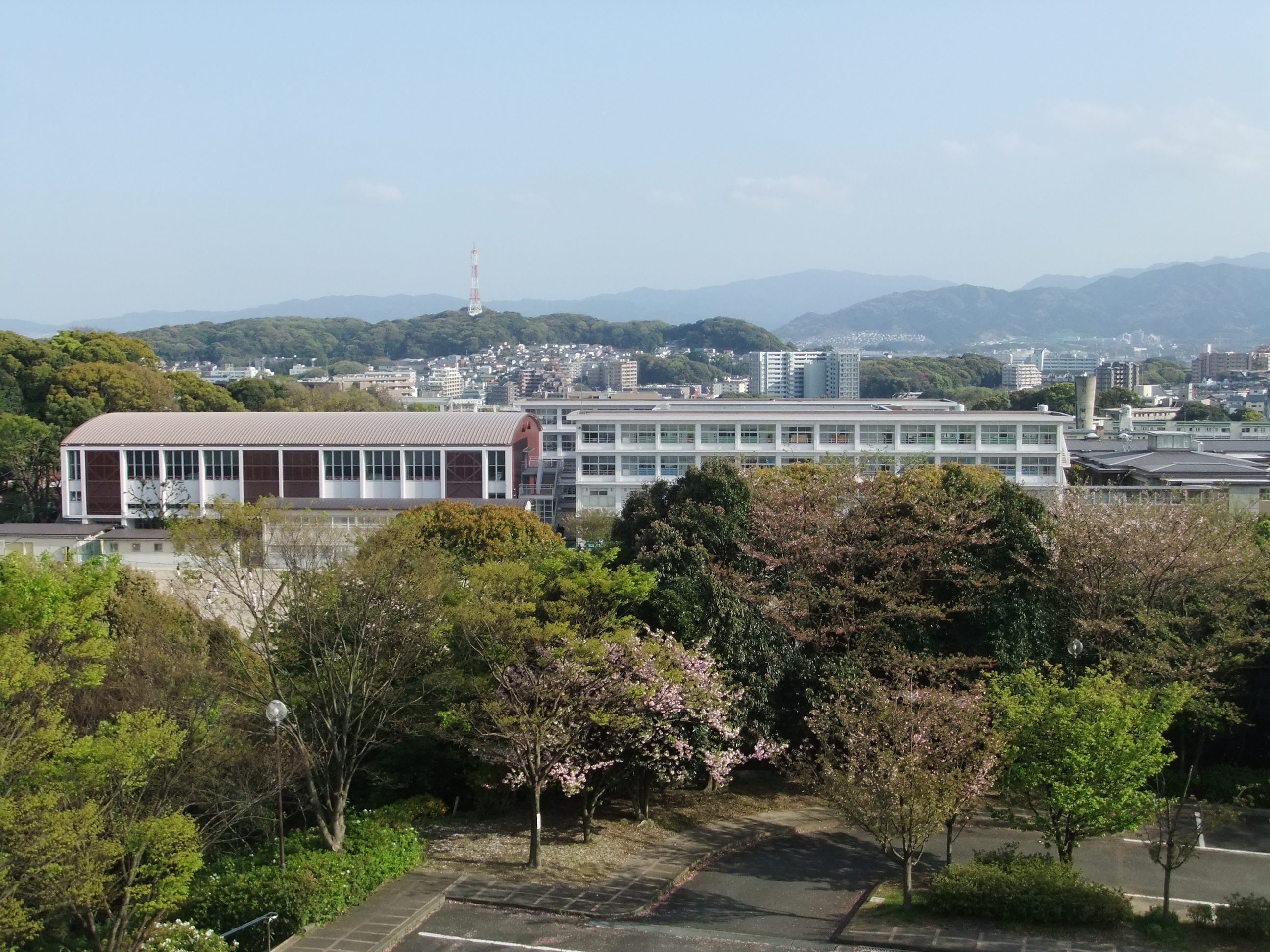
- The school in 2013

Location
- Terunigoku 1 Chūō-ku, Fukuoka, Fukuoka Prefecture 810-0032

Information
- Mottoes: Men and women for and with others Lux Veritatis (Light of Truth)
- Denomination: Jesuit, Catholic
- Established: 1932; 94 years ago
- Status: Junior and senior high school
- Gender: Coeducational
- Affiliation: Sophia University
- Founder: Paris Foreign Missions Society
- Former name: Fukuoka Theological Seminary
- Website: www.sophia-fukuoka.ed.jp

Sophia Fukuoka Junior and Senior High School (上智福岡中学高等学校, Jōchi Fukuoka chūgaku kōtō gakkō) is located in Chūō-ku, Fukuoka. Founded by the Catholic diocese as a seminary school in 1932 and undergoing several name changes, it has been managed by the Jesuits since 1983. It took its present name in 2010 when it became affiliated with Sophia University.

== History ==
The school traces its origin to 1932 when a bishop from the Paris Foreign Missions Society opened Fukuoka Christian Theological Seminary for the Roman Catholic Diocese of Fukuoka. In 1934 upon recognition by the prefect governor of Fukuoka it was named Hirao Academy. In 1936 it was renamed Taisei Junior High School. In 1946 the Catholic Marian Association took charge of the school. In 1948 the high school opened and in 1951 the Taizon Academy School Corporation was formed. In 1959 the junior high school closed. In 1969 the Fukuoka Diocese again took control of the school, and moved it to its present location in 1974.

In 1983 the Society of Jesus assumed management of the school and began an expansion program, reopening the middle school the following year. An exchange program with Auckland, New Zealand, began in 1989. By 1991 the middle and high school systems were integrated. In 2010 an educational alliance was signed with Sophia University and the next year the school was renamed Sophia Fukuoka Junior and Senior High School. In 2012 the school began to admit girls, from the first year level.

== School life ==
The educational philosophy follows that of the Jesuits: always seek the greater good and be men and women for and with others. The eagle, the symbol of Sophia University, is on the shield along with the words Lux Veritatis ("light of truth") and the English name "SOPHIA FUKUOKA."

The school colors are dark blue, deep red, and golden yellow. The school song since 2011 has been "Wagame Sophia's Eagle" with music and lyrics by Mitsuru Arai. Until the school name was changed in 2011 the song was "Taizon Academy School Song."

Sponsored sports include, for boys only, handball, soccer, softball, and basketball; for girls, volleyball; for boys and girls, Kendo, field, tennis, table tennis, badminton, and judo.

Within a network of Jesuit schools, Sophia shares initiatives based on the educational philosophy of educating "men and women for and with others." Seven participants from five Jesuit Schools in Fukuoka, Sydney, Hong Kong, Jakarta, and Manila have participated in a shared life for one week. Sophia also participates in the AFS student exchange programs, recently with Iceland, the Netherlands, and Austria.

Also Sophia has been supporting Colégio de Santo Inácio de Loiola in Timor-Leste. A sister school relationship was established with St. Joseph's High School, Timor-Leste, in 1997, but it seems the school has encountered difficulty with the government, for its political activism.

=== Sister schools (Jesuit affiliation) ===
- Sophia University (Chiyoda Ward, Tokyo)
- Sophia University Junior College Department (Hadano City, Kanagawa Prefecture)
- Elisabeth University of Music (Hiroshima- shi, Hiroshima Prefecture)
- Eiko Gakuen, Kamakura City (Kanagawa Prefecture)
- Rokko Junior and Senior High School (Hyogo kobe city)
- Hiroshima Academy Junior and Senior High School (Hiroshima-shi Hiroshima)

The above schools have Jesuits as their sponsors. In 2016 the Sophia College Corporation was formed with the University and other Jesuit schools to maximize the impact of the Jesuit and Ignatian charism amid a declining number of Jesuits. One way of reaching out is through teacher workshops, while school administrations and management remain intact.

=== Staged at the school ===
The TV drama "What is family?" by Fukuoka Broadcasting (FBS), shooting in July 2001 with nationwide broadcasting on 24 hour TV in Japan ( Nippon TV series). Cast: Shunsuke Osaka, Ken Tanaka, Hitomi Takahashi, Hiroshi Fuse, Mami Nomura, Hanayobu Yamamoto, Yutaro Imai, and Yoko Komon. Students from the school appeared as extras.

== Transport and environs ==
Transport: Nearest train station 15 minutes on foot from Fukuoka City Subway Nanakami Line "Sakurazaka Station." Nearest bus stop a one-minute walk from the Nishitetsu bus stop "Sophia Fukuoka Nakakoe." Only high school students may come to school by bicycle.

Environs: Fukuoka Municipal Zoo and Botanical Garden; Fukuoka Tsubo Elementary School with kindergarten through high school.

== Prominence ==
=== Alumni ===
- Masahiro Noda (SF writer, translator, Japan telework adviser)
- Toshinori Fukabori (Catholic bishop of Takamatsu)
- Tachibana Yoichi (jazz pianist)
- Kutaro Kurita (regional Talent, personality, 41st Century)
- Ruka Fukuoka (Fukuoka Broadcasting announcer)
- Shiro Tamura (Representative Director and President of Azusa-cho)
- Kenichi Hamano (Open Source Education, School Director of Linux Academy)
- Kaoru Tsu (baritone singer)
- Takeuchi Masato (Shikihiko Theater Company)

=== Teachers and staff ===
- Yotaro Oyanagi (writer, professor at former Kyushu Bunka Kaikyo Junior College)
- Robert M. Flynn (writer, Progress-in English)
- Akio Akimoto (Jesuit Association of Japan District Manager, Rokko Academy Principal / President)

== Gallery ==
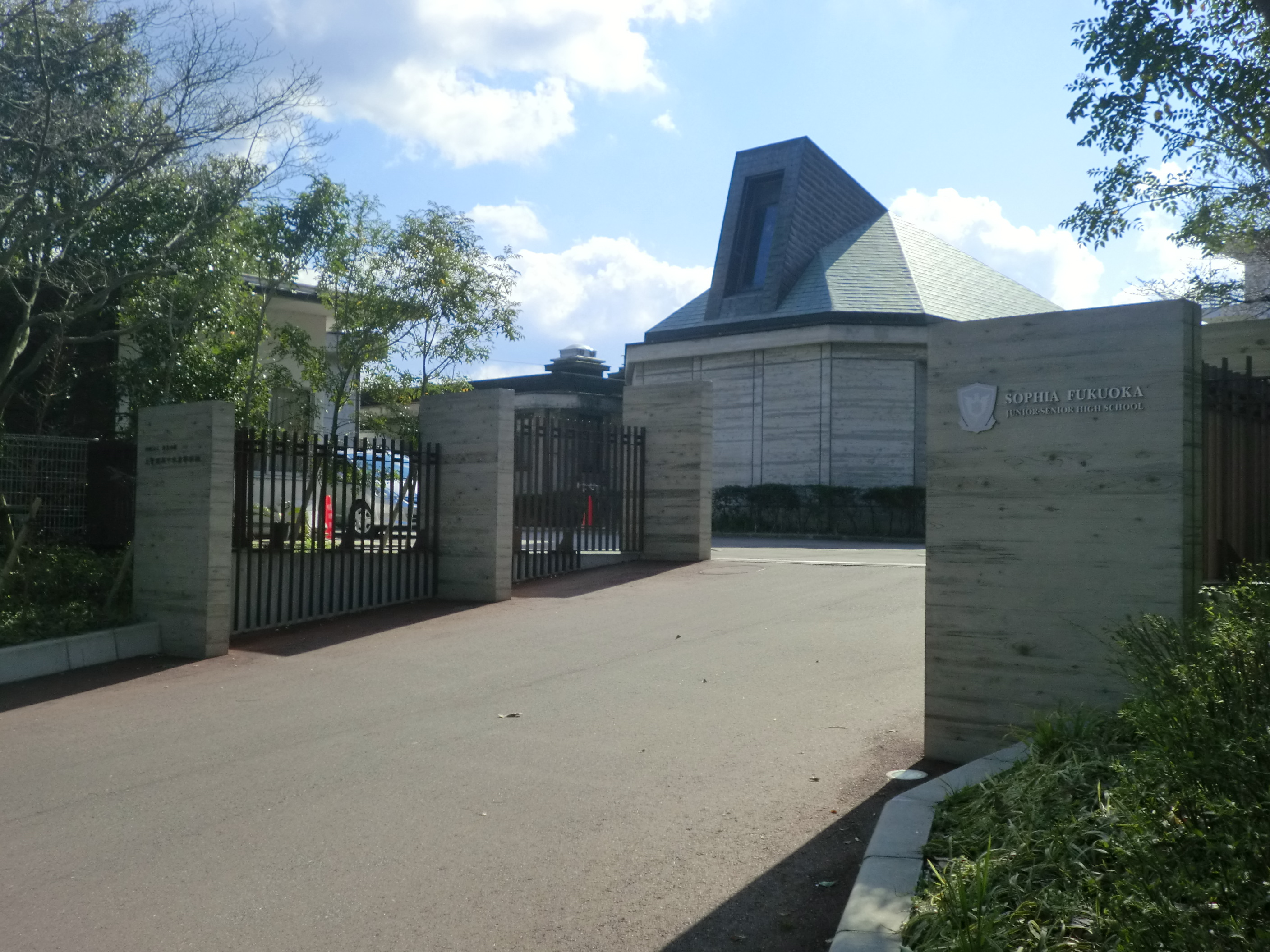
Entrance to school

Alternative view

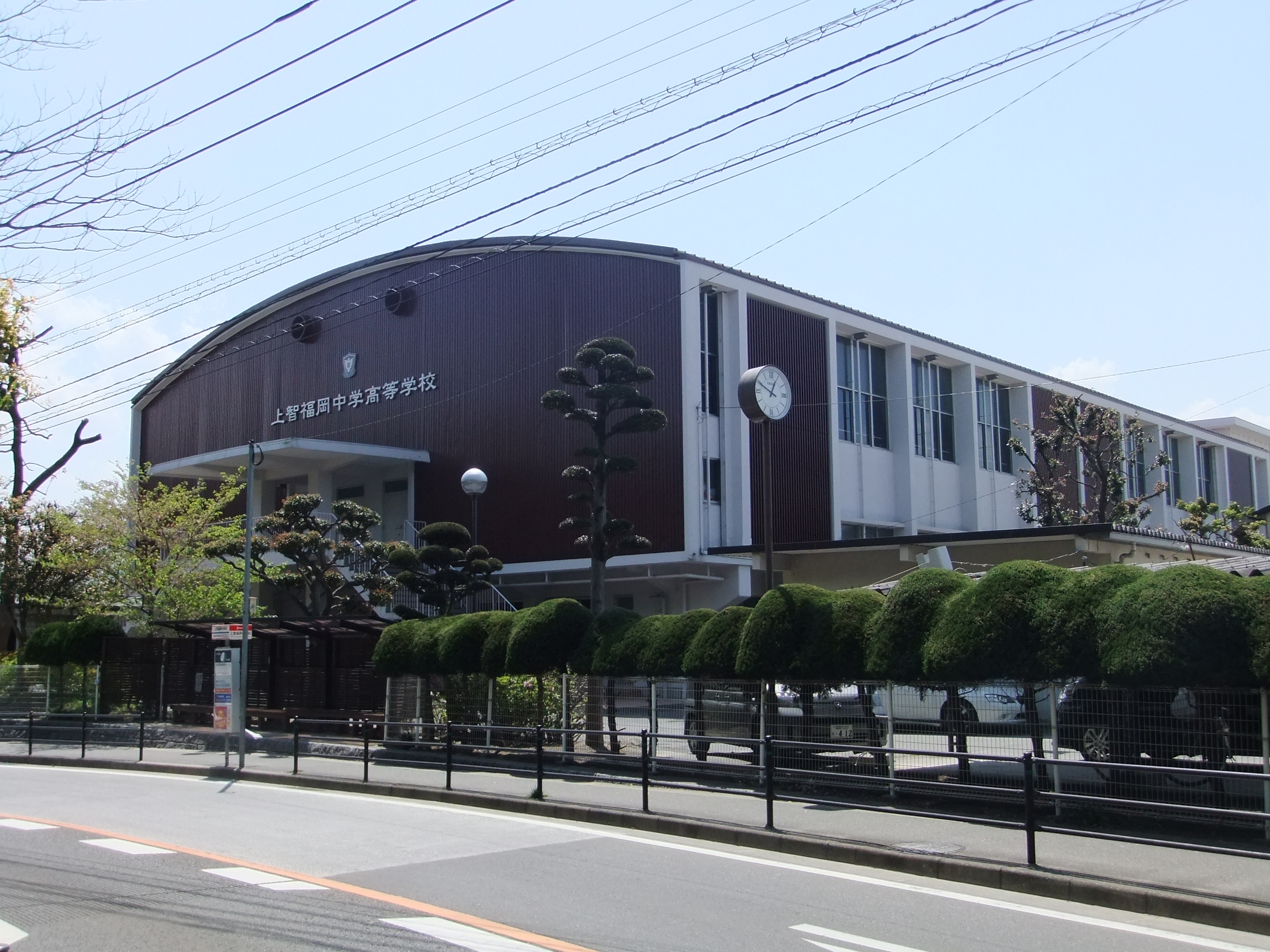
Main school building

View from outside

== See also ==
- Catholic Church in Japan
- Education in Japan
- List of Jesuit schools
