= George H. Minamiki =

Japanese American theologian and educator

George Hisaharu Minamiki, SJ (Japanese: 南木 久治 ジョージ) (みなみき ひさはる ジョージ; 1919–2002) was a Japanese-American Catholic theologian and educator. He was the first Nisei ordained a Jesuit priest and authored a significant work regarding the Chinese Rites controversy. He served as the second headmaster of Hiroshima Academy and was a language professor at the University of Notre Dame for over 20 years.

== Early life and education ==
George Hisaharu Minamiki was born in Downtown Los Angeles in 1917, to Issei parents from Yamaguchi Prefecture. His father was Asanoshin Minamiki, the 14th-generation head of a family of rural landowners, and his mother was Tsuru Minamiki (née Renkon), who had trained as a healthcare worker with the Japanese Red Cross in Yanai.

The family operated a boarding house on Wall Street, in the Los Angeles Flower District. Fr. Minamiki's mother Tsuru and sisters Margaret, Genevieve, and Marie worked in the floral and garment industries. Fr. Minamiki attended Maryknoll School on Hewitt Street, near Little Tokyo, graduating from Loyola High School in 1936, and Loyola University (now Loyola Marymount University) in 1941.

On December 7, 1941, the Empire of Japan attacked Pearl Harbor. Pursuant to Executive Order 9066, in 1942, Fr. Minamiki, his mother and siblings, were subject to internment at Manzanar War Relocation Center. His father had been in Japan looking after the family estate when war broke out, and became permanently estranged from the family in Los Angeles.

== Jesuit career ==
Fr. Minamiki joined the Society of Jesus in 1945 and was sent to the East Coast for his novitiate. In 1946, he returned to the California Province and studied at Mount Saint Michael in Spokane, Washington before being assigned to the Japanese Mission in Kobe, Japan in 1949, teaching English and religion at Rokko Gakuin (六甲学院).

Fr. Minamiki completed his theological studies at Alma College in California, (now the Jesuit School of Theology of Santa Clara), and was ordained a priest at the Jesuit Seminary in Los Gatos, California in 1954.

Fr. Minamiki then traveled to France for his tertianship, returning to Japan in 1956. After a year of language studies in Yokosuka, he resumed teaching at Eiko Gakuen in Kamakura, and then the newly established Hiroshima Gakuin. He officially joined the Japan Province of the Society of Jesus in 1962 and served as the second headmaster of Hiroshima Gakuin from 1962 to 1966, helping to establish the high school's academic program and reputation.

=== University of Notre Dame ===
Returning to the United States, Fr. Minamiki joined the faculty of the University of Notre Dame as a Japanese instructor. He was awarded a PhD in Liturgy in 1977, defending his dissertation on the Chinese Rites controversy. In 1985, this work was published under the title, The Chinese Rites Controversy: From Its Beginning to Modern Times.

At Notre Dame, Fr. Minamiki received the Sheedy Excellence in Teaching Award in 1988 and the Madden Award for Excellence in Teaching Freshmen in 1991. He served for more than 20 years as the coordinator of Notre Dame's Year-In-Japan program, until his retirement as professor emeritus in 1992. At that time, the Notre Dame Japan Club established the Minamiki Endowed Scholarship Fund.

== Death ==
Fr. Minamiki suffered a heart attack and died in 2002 at Los Angeles International Airport, on his way back to his campus residence in South Bend, Indiana. He was 82 and had just concluded a visit with his last surviving sibling and her children and grandchildren in Los Angeles.

A memorial service was held for his family at Loyola Marymount University and his cremated remains were placed in the crypt of St. Ignatius, on the campus of Sophia University in Tokyo. A tree was dedicated to his memory, and a memorial plaque was installed on the campus of Notre Dame.

== Bibliography ==
- Minamiki, George (1985). The Chinese rites controversy: From its beginning to modern times. Loyola University Press. ISBN 978-0-8294-0457-9.
