= Masanobu Ogura =

Japanese politician

- 小倉 將信
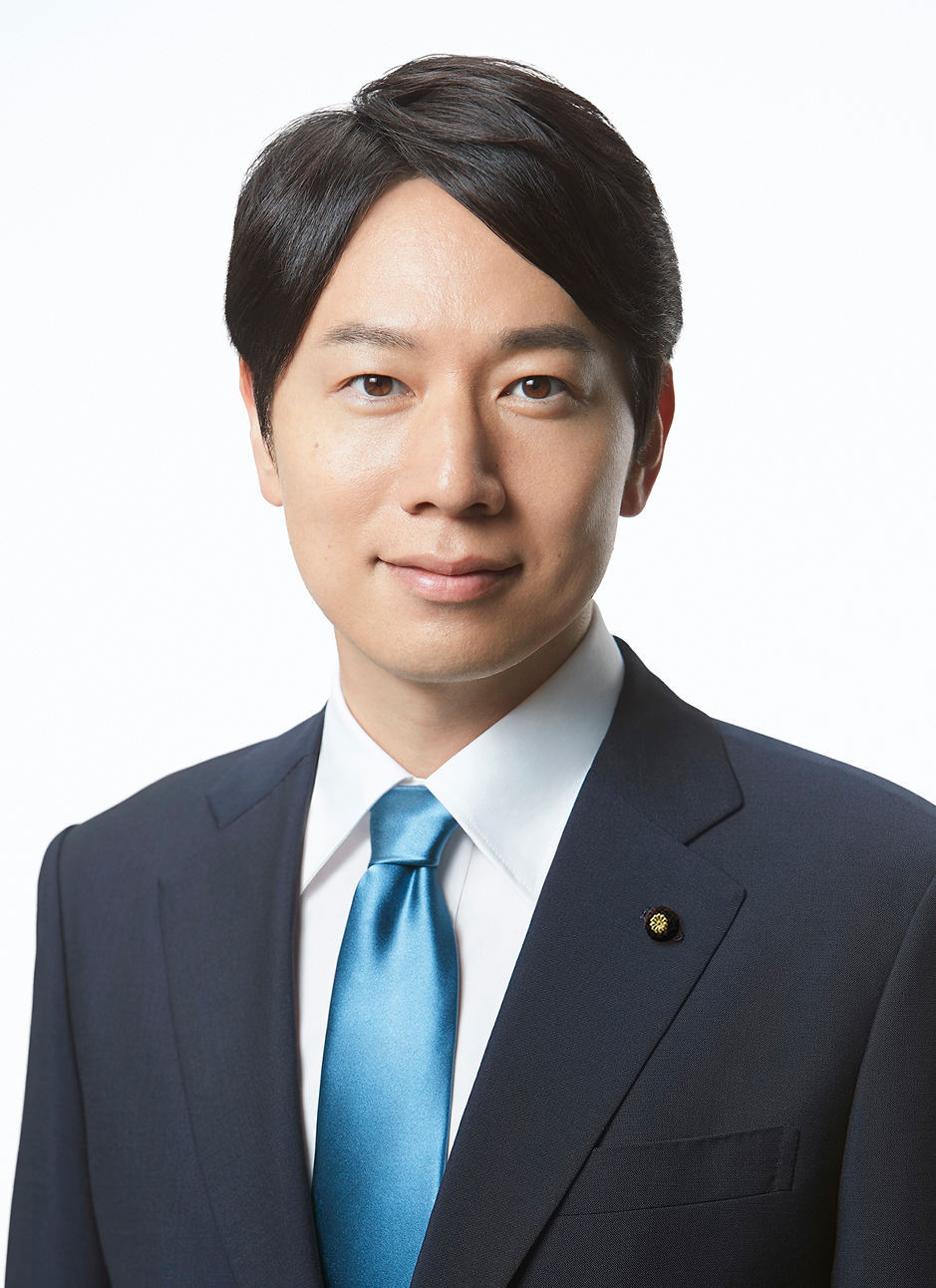
- Official portrait, 2021

Minister of State for Special Missions Child Policy, Youth Empowerment
- In office 1 April 2023 – 13 September 2023
- Prime Minister: Fumio Kishida
- Preceded by: Office established
- Succeeded by: Ayuko Kato

Minister of State for Special Missions Declining Birthrate, Gender Equality
- In office 10 August 2022 – 13 September 2023
- Prime Minister: Fumio Kishida
- Preceded by: Office established
- Succeeded by: Ayuko Kato

Member of the House of Representatives
- In office 16 December 2012 – 9 October 2024
- Preceded by: Mari Kushibuchi
- Succeeded by: Shunsuke Ito
- Constituency: Tokyo 23rd

Personal details
- Born: 30 May 1981 (age 44) Tama, Tokyo, Japan
- Party: Liberal Democratic
- Education: Eiko Gakuen
- Alma mater: University of Tokyo; Oxford University

Masanobu Ogura (小倉將信, Ogura Masanobu; born May 30, 1981) is a former Japanese politician. He served as a member of the House of Representatives belonging to the Liberal Democratic Party. He served in the Second Kishida Cabinet and previously serving in the Second Kishida Cabinet (First Reshuffle) both times as Cabinet Office Minister of State for Special Missions.

== Biography ==
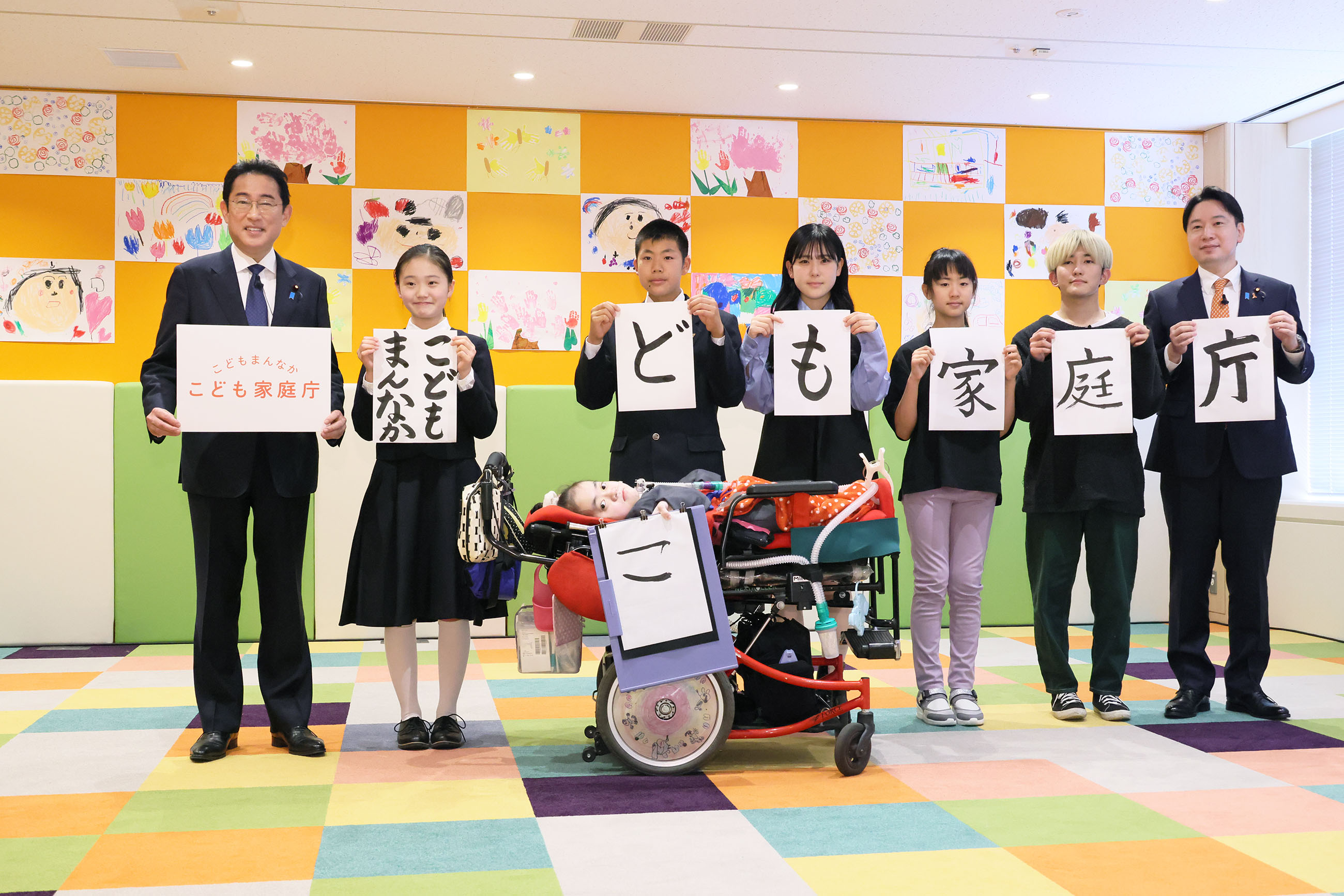
Ogura (far right) at the launch of the Children and Families Agency in 2023

Masanobu Ogura was born in Tokyo on 30 May 1981. After attending Eiko Gakuen Junior and Senior High School, he graduated from the University of Tokyo in 2004 and joined the Bank of Japan. He graduated from Oxford University in 2009 with an MA in Financial Economics.

In July 2011, he retired from the Bank of Japan. In November of the same year, he was appointed as the head of the Tokyo 23 Ward Branch of the House of Representatives through a public offering by the Tokyo Metropolitan Federation of the Liberal Democratic Party.

He ran in the 46th House of Representatives general election in December 2012 and defeated the incumbent of the Democratic Party of Japan, Banri Kushibuchi, and Shunsuke Ito (Kousuke Ito's son) of the Japan Restoration Party, and was elected for the first time.

In the 47th House of Representatives general election in December 2014, he defeated Kushibuchi and Ito again and was re-elected. On August 7, 2017, he was appointed Parliamentary Vice-Minister for Internal Affairs and Communications in the 3rd Abe Cabinet in the 3rd Reshuffle.

He was elected to the 48th House of Representatives in October 2017.
