= Koichiro =

- Gender: Male

Origin
- Origin: Japanese
- Meaning: Different meanings depending on the kanji used

Kōichirō, Koichiro, Kouichirou or Kohichiroh is a masculine Japanese given name.

== Written forms ==
- 晃一郎, "clear, one, son"
- 光一郎, "light, one, son"
- 弘一郎, "vast, one, son"
- 鴻一郎, "prosperous, one, son"
- 紘一郎, "large, one, son"
- 浩一郎, "vigorous, one, son"
- 耕一郎, "till, one, son"
- 航一郎, "navigate, one, son"
- 倖一郎, "happiness, one, son"
- 孝一郎, "filial piety, one, son"
- 興一朗, "entertain, one, serene"
- 紘一朗, "large, one, serene"
- こういちろう in hiragana
- コウイチロウ in katakana

=== People ===
- Kōichirō Asakai (朝海 浩一郎; 1906–1995), Japanese politician
- Kōichirō Genba (玄葉 光一郎; born 1964), Japanese politician
- Koichiro Harada (原田 耕一郎; born 1941), Japanese mathematician
- Koichiro Hirayama (平山 紘一郎; born 1946), Japanese sport wrestler
- Kōichirō Hoshino (星野 倖一郎), Japanese manga artist
- Koichiro Ichimura (市村 浩一郎; born 1964), Japanese politician
- Koichiro Katafuchi (片渕 浩一郎; born 1975), Japanese footballer
- Koichiro Kawano (河野 晃一郎; born 1981), Japanese golfer
- Koichiro Kimura (木村 浩一郎; 1969–2014), Japanese mixed martial artist
- Koichiro Koga (古賀 幸一郎; born 1984), Japanese volleyball player
- Kōichirō Matsuura (松浦 晃一郎; born 1937), Japanese diplomat
- Koichiro Mitani (三谷 浩一郎; born 1968), Japanese judoka
- Kōichirō Morioka (森岡 紘一朗; born 1985), Japanese racewalker
- Koichiro Nishi (西 興一朗; born 1979), Japanese actor
- Kōichirō Nishikawa (西川 公一郎; born 1949), Japanese particle physicist
- Koichiro Shima (嶋 浩一郎; born 1968), Japanese creative director
- Koichiro Shimizu (清水 鴻一郎; born 1946), Japanese surgeon and politician
- Kōichirō Tomita (冨田 弘一郎; 1925–2006), Japanese astronomer
- Kōichirō Uno (宇能 鴻一郎; born 1934), Japanese writer
- Kōichirō Yasunaga (安永 航一郎,; born 1962), Japanese manga artist

Koichirō or Koichirou (written: 小一郎) is a separate given name, though it may be romanized the same way. Notable people with the name include:

- Kawada Koichiro (川田 小一郎; 1836–1896), Japanese businessman and banker
- Tachibana Koichirō (立花 小一郎; 1861–1929), Japanese general

== Fictional characters ==
- Kōichirō Endo (遠藤 耕一郎), a character in the tokusatsu series Megaranger
- Kōichirō Kashima (鹿島 耕一郎), a character in the manga series All Out!!
- Koichirō Marito (鞠戸 孝一郎), a character in the anime series Aldnoah.Zero
- Kouichiro Sako (佐古 浩一郎), a character in the anime series Stratos 4
- Kōichirō Tanba (丹波 光一郎), a character in the manga series Ace of Diamond
