= Sophia University =

Private Catholic university in Tokyo, Japan

- 上智大学
- Motto: Lux Veritatis (Latin) 真理の光 (Japanese); Shinri no Hikari (Romaji)
- Motto in English: Light of Truth
- Type: Private research university
- Established: 1913; 113 years ago
- Founder: Society of Jesus
- Religious affiliation: Catholic Church (Jesuit)
- Academic affiliations: AALAU, IAU, IFCU
- Chancellor: Sali Augustine
- President: Yoshiaki Terumichi
- Faculty: 1,509 (2022/23)
- Administrative staff: 293
- Students: 13,437 (2022/23)
- Undergraduates: 12,080 (2022/23)
- Postgraduates: 1,357 (2022/23)
- Location: Chiyoda-ku, Tokyo, Japan; 35°41′03″N 139°43′55″E
- Campus: 11 acres (4.5 ha); Urban
- Alma Mater song: Sophia
- Colors: Maroon
- Nickname: Sophians
- Mascots: Sophian-kun (ソフィアン君, maroon eagle)
- Website: www.sophia.ac.jp/eng/

Sophia University (Japanese: 上智大学, Hepburn: Jōchi Daigaku; Latin: Universitas Sedis Sapientiae) is a private Jesuit research university in Tokyo, Japan. Founded in 1913 by the Jesuits, it was granted university status in 1928, becoming the first Catholic university in Japan. Sophia University has 12,080 undergraduate students and 1,357 postgraduate students. The university has 9 undergraduate faculties and 10 graduate schools, with over 13,900 students in total.

Sophia University has international students from 77 countries and exchange agreements with 400 universities in 81 countries. As of 2022, foreign students constituted approximately 9% of the student body.

Sophia's alumni are commonly referred to as "Sophians", among whom include the 79th Prime Minister of Japan, Morihiro Hosokawa, several members of the Japanese National Diet, several foreign statesmen (including Carlos Holmes Trujillo, Mukhriz Mahathir, and Li Linsi), and a number of actors and musicians in the Japanese film and music industries.

== Origins of the university name ==
The name of the university is traced to letters of correspondence between two of the three founders of what would become Sophia University, Fr. James Rockliff, SJ and Fr. Hermann Hoffmann, SJ. The Japanese term 上智 ("higher wisdom" or "supreme wisdom", Jōchi) was the equivalent of the Latin word sapientia, which means wisdom. According to Catholic Church tradition, the term sapientia refers to one of the Church's devotional titles for the Blessed Virgin Mary, "the Seat of Wisdom".

When Joseph Eylenbosch, SJ began teaching Greek at the university in April 1924, he thought that the Japanese term jōchi was the equivalent of the Greek term σοφία (sofia). Afterwards, the students had proposed that the school be known as Sophia University.

Fr. Hoffmann, SJ, who was serving as University President at that time, initially opposed the proposal. However, he soon accepted the idea and submitted the proposal to Rome for the approval.

The English-language, peer-reviewed academic journal Monumenta Nipponica, which was first published in 1938, identified itself as being published by Sophia University. The use of Sophia as the university name then became firmly established in Japan and overseas.

== History ==
=== Early history ===
The origins of Sophia University could be traced to 1549 when Saint Francis Xavier, a prominent member and co-founder of the Society of Jesus, arrived in Japan to spread Christianity. In his letters to his fellow Jesuits, he had expressed hopes of establishing a university in Japan.

During the so-called Kirishitan period of Japanese history, the Catholic Church had been responsible for establishing and administering educational institutions in Japan called Collegios and Seminarios, serving as bridges between the East and West.

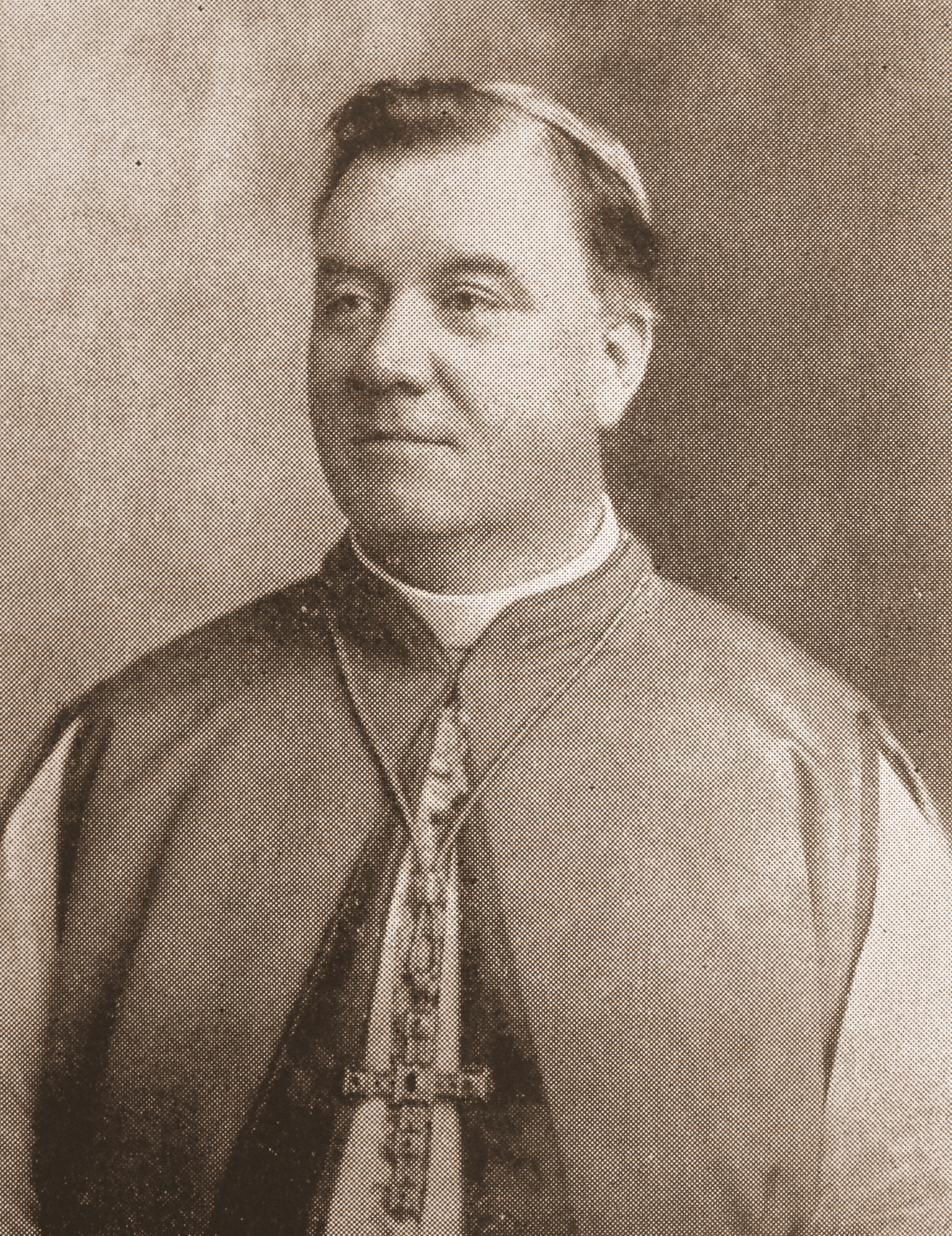
William H. O'Connell had been appointed as a special ambassador of the Vatican to Japan.

The establishment of the university only began to take place more than 400 years from St. Francis Xavier's arrival in Japan. In 1903, three Jesuit priests from Europe came to Japan to continue the missionary work of the Church and to help establish Sophia University. One of the founders, Fr. Joseph Dahlmann, SJ from Germany, who had come to Japan via India, had listened to the requests of Catholics in the country, who expressed their desires to construct a Catholic university to serve as the cultural and spiritual base of the Church's missionary operations in Japan.

Dahlmann heeded the requests and sent a proposal to the then-Bishop of Rome, Pope Pius X, at the Holy See in Rome. In 1905, Dahlmann was granted a private audience with the Pope, who promised to assign the Society of Jesus to create and administer a Catholic university in Japan. In Dahlmann's Latin memoirs regarding the encounter with Pius, he recounted that he spoke as follows: "Habebitis collegium in Japonica, magnam universitatem (in English: "You (plural) will have in Japan a college that is a great university".).

On that same year, the then-Bishop of Portland, Maine in the United States, William H. O'Connell, was appointed by the Pope to serve as a special ambassador of the Vatican to Emperor Meiji in Japan. O'Connell was also tasked to survey the situation in Japan. When he was granted an audience with Emperor Meiji, he had ascertained the education policy directions of the Japanese Ministry of Education, and reported to officials at the Holy See regarding the possible establishment of a Catholic university in Japan.

At the 25th General Congregation of the Society of Jesus in held in Rome in September 1906, Pius X issued a formal written statement to the Jesuits to establish a Catholic university in Japan. Thus, the delegates at the Congregation voted unanimously in favour of the Pope's commands, and the first concrete steps were taken to prepare a university institution in the East.

=== Founding ===
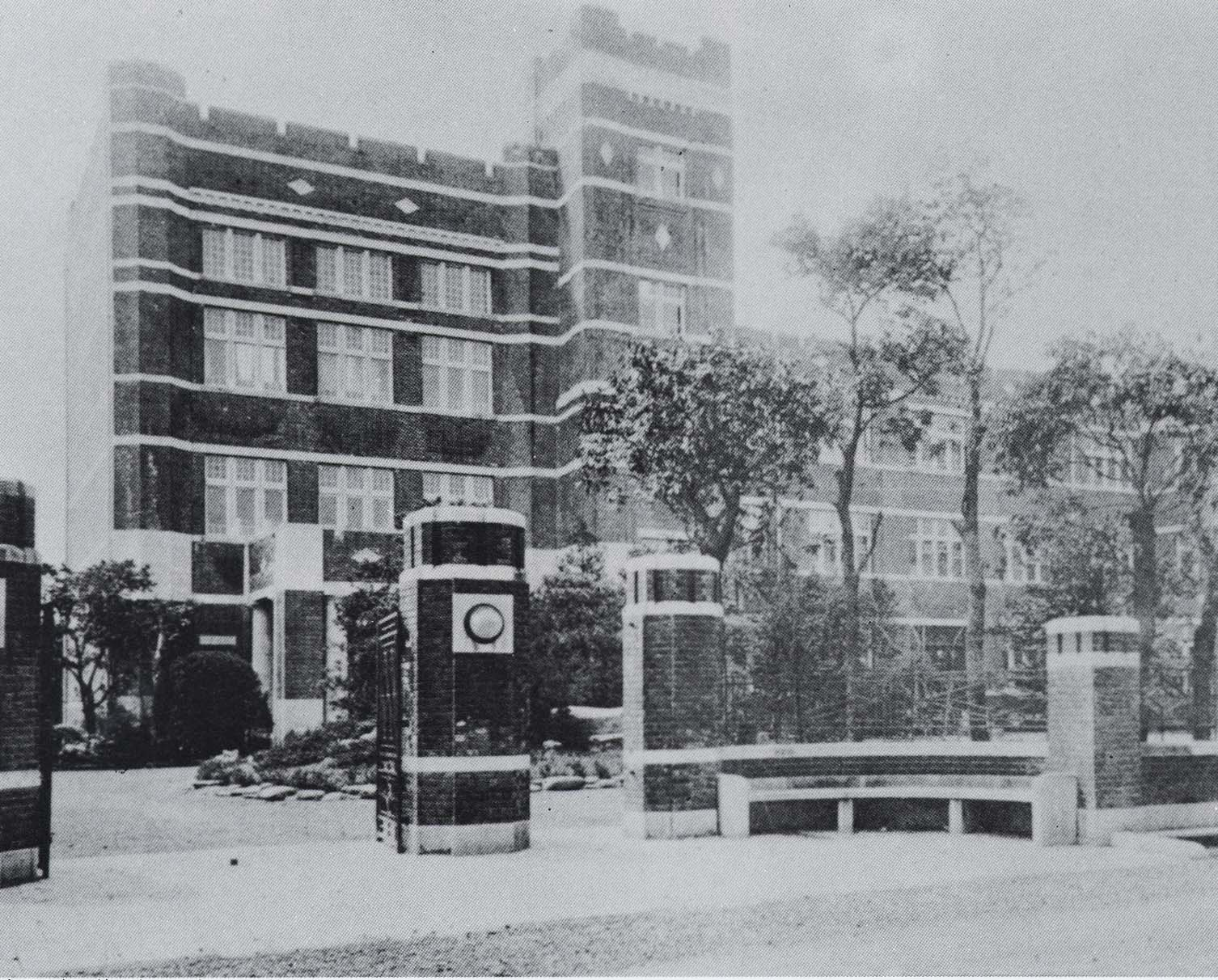
An academic building at Sophia University, a year after its establishment.

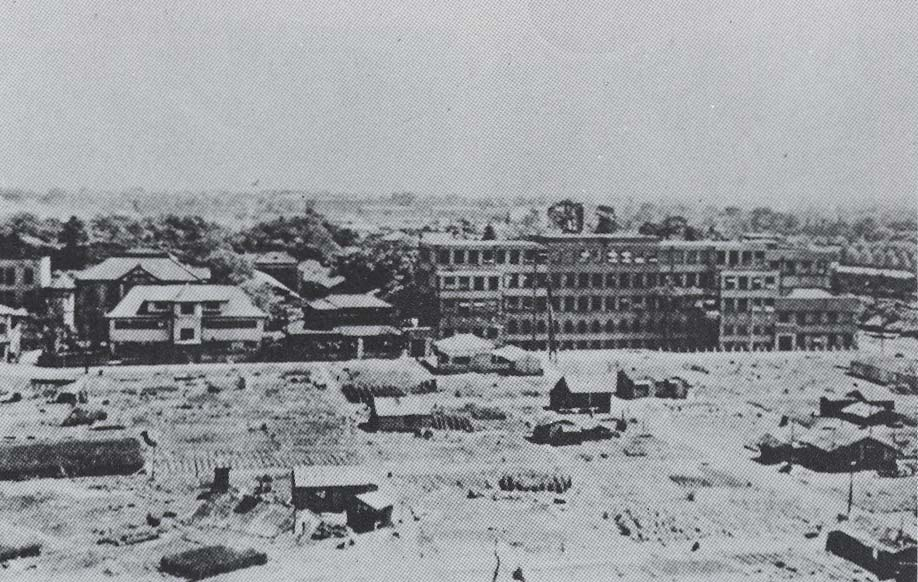
Sophia University in 1945.

Sophia University was founded by Jesuits in 1913. It opened with departments of German Literature, Philosophy and Commerce, headed by its founder Fr. Hermann Hoffmann, SJ (1864–1937) as its first official president.

In 1932, a small group of Sophia University students refused to salute the war dead at Yasukuni Shrine in the presence of a Japanese military attache, saying it violated their religious beliefs. The military attache was withdrawn from Sophia as a result of this incident, damaging the university's reputation in the eyes of the government of the Japanese Empire. The Archbishop of Tokyo intervened in the standoff by permitting Catholic students to salute the war dead, after which many Sophia students, as well as Hermann Hoffmann himself, participated in rites at Yasukuni. The Congregation for the Evangelization of Peoples later issued the Pluries Instanterque in 1936, which encouraged Catholics to attend Shinto shrines as a patriotic gesture; the Vatican re-issued this document after the war in 1951. Hermann Heuvers served as the university's second president from 1937 until 1941.

=== Post-war growth ===
Sophia University continued to grow as it increased the number of academic departments, faculty members and students, in addition to advancing its international focus by establishing an exchange program. Many of its students studied at Georgetown University in the United States as early as 1935. Sophia's junior college was established in 1973, followed by the opening of Sophia Community College in 1976.

=== 21st century ===
With the founding of the Faculty of Liberal Arts in 2006, Sophia University presently holds 27 departments in its eight faculties. Its current president is Yoshiaki Terumichi. Toshiaki Koso serves as head of its board of directors. Since 2008, the Global Leadership Program was started for students from four Jesuit universities in East Asia: Ateneo de Manila University in the Philippines, Fu Jen Catholic University in Taiwan, Sogang University in South Korea, and Sophia University in Japan. In 2016 the university reached out to the four Jesuit junior-senior high schools in Japan, joining them in the Sophia College Corporation to help them pass on the Jesuit charism to their lay faculty through workshops and other assistance. These schools are Sophia-Fukuoka, Eiko Gakuen, Hiroshima Gakuin, and Rokko School.

In 2019, Pope Francis visited Sophia University as a part of his 2019 pastoral tour. This was the first time in 38 years that a pope visited Sophia University.

== Campuses ==
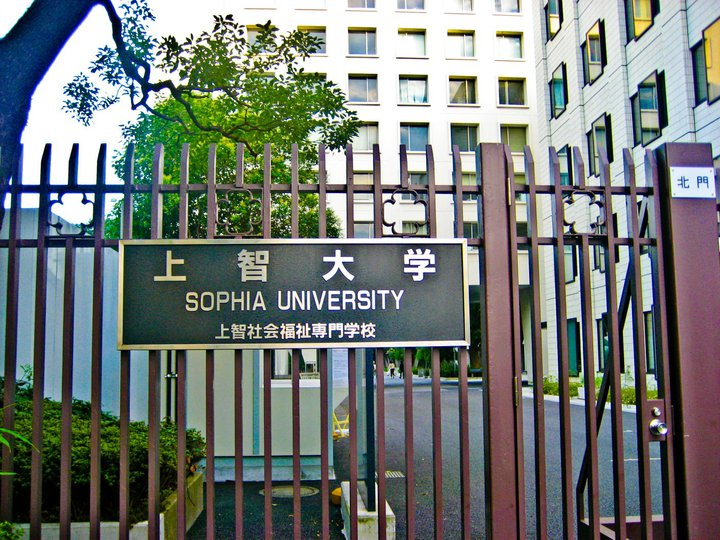
Sophia University

Sophia's main campus at Yotsuya is urban, consisting of roughly 25 large, modern buildings in the center of Tokyo. The majority of Sophia's 10,000 undergraduate students spend nearly all their time here. The faculties of Theology, Humanities, Law, Foreign Studies, Economics, Liberal Arts, and Science and Technology have their home here, as do the main library, cafeteria, gymnasium, chapel, bookstore, and offices. In April 2006, the Faculty of Comparative Culture, which had been located at the smaller Ichigaya campus, moved to the main Yotsuya campus and changed its name to the Faculty of Liberal Arts. Nearly all of Sophia's foreign exchange and most of international students study at the FLA.

Students of Department of Nursing, Faculty of Human Sciences, starting from their second year, and students of the Course of Midwifery, commute to Mejiro Seibo campus at Shinjuku. Mejiro Seibo campus was originally the campus of Seibo College, before it merged with Sophia University, and the department has retained connection to the nearby Seibo Hospital.

The Tokyo office of the Council on International Educational Exchange, the student exchange organisation, which oversees roughly half of the international students, is also based on the main Yotsuya Campus. The Shakujii (Tokyo) campus housed the Faculty of Theology. The Hadano campus in Kanagawa Prefecture is home to the Sophia Junior College, as well as a number of seminar halls and athletics complexes.

=== List of campuses ===
- Yotsuya Campus (Chiyoda Ward, Tokyo)
- Mejiro Seibo Campus (Shinjuku Ward, Tokyo)
- Shakuji Campus (Nerima Ward, Tokyo)
- Hadano Campus (Hadano City, Kanagawa)
- Osaka Satellite Campus (Osaka City, Osaka)

== International cooperation ==
Sophia University has international partnership agreements with 396 institutions in 81 countries. Some of Sophia's partner universities include Georgetown University, Yale University, University of Hong Kong, Sogang University, and LMU Munich. It also maintains nine overseas bases serving as liaisons between the Sophia School Corporation and overseas localities.

- Luxembourg Office (ルクセンブルクオフィス)
- ASEAN Hub Centre in Bangkok (ASEANハブセンター)
- China Liaison Offices in Beijing and Shanghai (中国連絡処)
- Cologne Office (ケルンオフィス)
- Los Angeles Office (ロスアンゼルスオフィス)
- New York Office (ニューヨークオフィス)

== Sophia School Corporation ==
Established in 1911, the Sophia School Corporation (学校法人上智学院, Gakko Hojin Jochi Gakuin) is a public interest corporation established under the Private School Act (Act no. 270 of 1945) for the purpose of establishing a private school. The Sophia School Corporation serves as the operator of Sophia University and other Jesuit-affiliated schools in Japan, managing a total of seven schools. It was established in 1951.

Academic Institutions Under the Sophia School Corporation
Higher Education Institutions	Secondary Education Institutions
Sophia University (Chiyoda Ward, Tokyo)	Eiko Gakuen Junior and Senior High School (Kamakura City, Kanagawa)
Sophia University Junior College Division (Hadano City, Kanagawa)	Rokko Junior and Senior High School (Kobe City, Hyogo)
	Hiroshima Gakuin Junior and Senior High School (Hiroshima City, Hiroshima)
	Sophia-Fukuoka Junior and Senior High School (Fukuoka City, Fukuoka)

== Academics ==
The university has nine undergraduate faculties with 29 departments as well as 10 graduate schools with 25 programmes. With over 14,021 students as of 2017, the university provides academic opportunities for students from Japan and overseas to study in Japan. Sophia also possesses a wide-variety of English-taught academic programmes such as those provided by the Faculty of Liberal Arts (FLA). English programmes are also provided by the Faculty of Science and Technology (FST) through two programmes and the Green Science Program, provided by the Department of Materials and Life Sciences, and the Green Engineering Program, provided by the Department of Engineering and Applied Sciences.

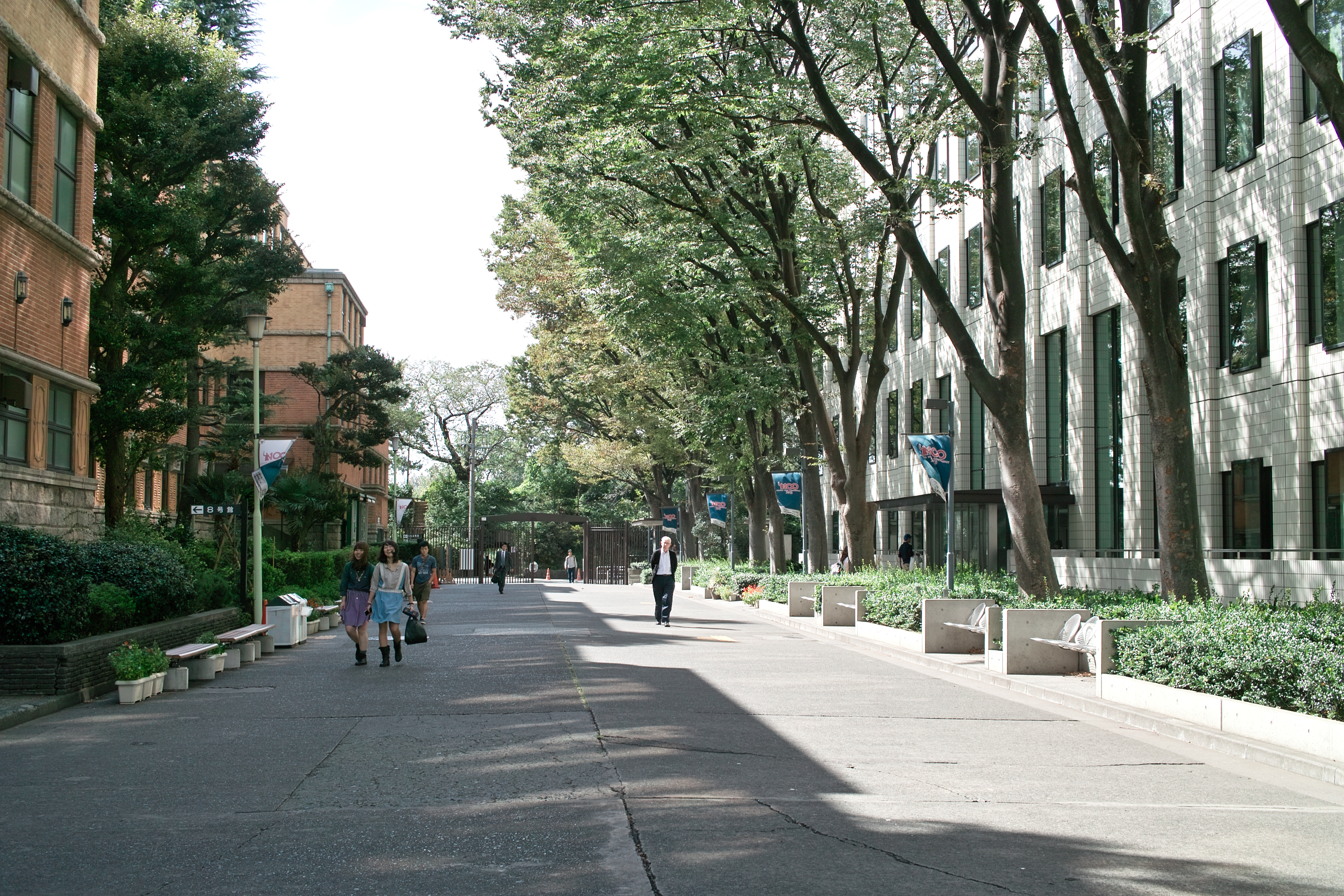
Photograph of the Sophia University Yotsuya Campus in Chiyoda, Tokyo.

=== Undergraduate faculties and departments ===
- Faculty of Theology
- Faculty of Humanities
- Faculty of Human Science
- Faculty of Law
- Faculty of Economics
- Faculty of Foreign Studies
- Faculty of Global Studies
- Faculty of Liberal Arts
- Faculty of Science and Engineering

Sophia University undergraduate faculties and departments
Faculty of Theology	Faculty of Humanities	Faculty of Human Sciences	Faculty of Law	Faculty of Economics	Faculty of Foreign Studies	Faculty of Global Studies	Faculty of Science and Technology	Faculty of Liberal Arts
Department of Theology	Department of Philosophy	Department of Education	Department of Law	Department of Economics	Department of English Studies	Department of Global Studies	Department of Materials and Life Sciences	Department of Liberal Arts
	Department of History	Department of Psychology	Department of International Legal Studies	Department of Management	Department of German Studies		Department of Engineering and Applied Sciences	
	Department of Japanese Literature	Department of Sociology	Department of Legal Studies of the Global Environment		Department of French Studies		Department of Information and Communication Sciences	
	Department of English Literature	Department of Social Services			Department of Hispanic Studies			
	Department of German Literature	Department of Nursing			Department of Russian Studies			
	Department of French Literature				Department of Luso-Brazilian Studies			
	Department of Journalism							

==== Academic programmes taught in English ====
In addition to most courses of study taught almost entirely in Japanese, Sophia has a variety of academic programmes and courses taught in English. The Faculty of Liberal Arts (FLA), the Green Science and Engineering courses in the Faculty of Science and Technology (FST), and the Sophia Program for Sustainable Futures (SPSF).

===== Courses taught in the Faculty of Liberal Arts =====
- International Business and Economics (IBE)
- Comparative Culture
- Social Studies

===== English courses taught in the Faculty of Science and Technology =====
- Green Science programme (offered by the Department of Materials and Life Sciences)
- Green Engineering programme (offered by the Department of Engineering and Applied Sciences)

===== Courses taught in the Sophia Program for Sustainable Futures =====
Sophia Program for Sustainable Futures (SPSF)
Departments and affiliated undergraduate faculties	Years of implementation
Department of Economics (Faculty of Economics)	September 2020
Department of Education (Faculty of Human Sciences)	September 2020
Department of Sociology (Faculty of Human Sciences)	September 2020
Department of Global Studies (Faculty of Global Studies)	September 2020
Department of Journalism (Faculty of Humanities)	September 2021
Department of Management (Faculty of Economics)	September 2022

===== Graduate schools and programmes =====
- Graduate School of Science and Technology
- Graduate School of Global Environmental Studies
- Graduate School of Economics
- Graduate School of Human Sciences
- Graduate School of Law
- Graduate School of Theology
- Graduate School of Applied Religious Studies
- Graduate School of Humanities
- Graduate School of Global Studies
- Graduate School of Languages and Linguistics

== University academic research ==
Sophia University is a comprehensive research university with 9 undergraduate faculties with 10 graduate schools located on a single campus in Chiyoda, Tokyo.

As a research institution, the university established the Sophia Research Organisation (SRO) in April 2005 in order to promote and facilitate interdisciplinary and organisational research activities. The SRO possesses two research divisions: the Research Institutes Division and the Project Research Division. The university also has affiliated Research Organisations.

Simultaneously, Sophia's Centre for Research Promotion and Support provides additional support to general research activities and strengthens the a three-way collaboration initiative among industries, government, and academia. The Intellectual Property Rights Committee, established in 2005, ensures smooth collaborative support among the three individual groups and examines the inventions and intellectual properties of the researchers affiliated with Sophia University.

To assist with academic research and learning, Sophia currently has a total of 3 libraries and an affiliated library, possessing in total more than 1.15 million books and 12,570 journal titles.

=== Sophia University libraries ===
- Sophia University Central Library (上智大学中央図書館)
- Law School Library (法科大学院図書室)
- Mejiro Seibo Campus Library (目白聖母キャンパス図書室)

=== Affiliated library ===
- Kirishitan Bunko Library (キリシタン文庫)

Sophia University academic research
Academic Research Support	Research Institutes Division	Project Research Division	Affiliated research organisations
Sophia Research Organisation	Institute for Christian Culture	Nanotechnology Research Centre	Kirishitan Bunko Library
Centre for Research Promotion and Support	Institute for Medieval Thought	Centre for Islamic Studies	Monumenta Nipponica
Intellectual Property Rights Committee	Iberoamerican Institute	Sustainable Energy Research Centre	Sophia Asia Centre for Research and Human Development
Sophia Science and Technology Liaison Office (SLO)	Linguistic Institute for International Communication	Research and Development Centre for CAE Technologies Applied for Next-Generation Transport Aircraft Design	Institute for Grief Care
	Institute of Global Concern	Microwave Science Research Centre	Semiconductor Research Institute
	Institute of Comparative Culture	Water-Scarce Society Information and Research Centre	Sophia University Institute of Bioethics
	European Institute	Sophia Institute for Human Security	Human Resource Centre for International Cooperation
	Institute of Asian, African, and Middle Eastern Studies		Institute of International Relations
	Institute of American and Canadian Studies		
Institute of Media, Culture, and Journalism
Institute for Studies of the Global Environment

List of select research journals/publications and affiliations
Research journals/publications	Affiliations
Monumenta Nipponica	
AGLOS Journal of Area-Based Global Studies	Graduate School of Global Studies
Cosmopolis (コスモポリス)	Graduate School of Global Studies
Sophia Discussion Paper Series	Faculty of Economics Graduate School of Economics
Sophia Business Case Series	Faculty of Economics Graduate School of Economics
Sophia Economic Review (上智経済論集)	Faculty of Economics Graduate School of Economics
Sophia Linguistica	Sophia Linguistic Institute for International Communication
Ibero-American Studies (イベロアメリカ研究)	Ibero-American Institute
Encontros Lusófonos	Ibero-American Institute
ILA: Investigaciones Latinoamericanas (ラテンアメリカ研究)	Ibero-American Institute
LAMS: Latin American Monograph Series (ラテンアメリカ・モノグラフ・シリーズ)	Ibero-American Institute
Sophia Journal of Asian, African, and Middle Eastern Studies	Institute of Asian, African, and Middle Eastern Studies
Occasional Papers (Monograph Series)	Institute of Asian, African, and Middle Eastern Studies
SOIAS Research Paper Series	Sophia Organization for Islamic Area Studies

== Student life ==
=== School festival ===
The name of the school festival is Sophia Festival (ソフィア祭) and is held every year between October 31 and November 3. "Sophians Contest", where contestants are chosen for both appearance and spreading social awareness, and other events are held. In addition, volunteers from school clubs and departments make and sell curry rice, naan, and other snacks, and famous individuals are invited to the campus to hold lectures.

=== Cultural activities ===
Many clubs are active under Cultural/Academic Alliance, Music Activities Committee, Theatrical Activities Committee, and Hobby Club Alliance. Those include 19 cultural clubs, 10 musical clubs, and 8 theatrical clubs. In addition, there are many unorganized groups, including Catholic organizations, such as Catholic Student Association, SAfro FAmily, Sophia Choir, etc. Angles is a student-run academic journal in the Department of English Studies.

=== Sports ===
Sophia University does not have a preferential admission system for high school students with sport track, however, the university supports students with excellent results in individual sports.

Sophia University - Nanzan University Inter-University Athletic Tournament or "Johnan" (上南戦) has been held since 1960 to strengthen bonds between Catholic universities, with the participation from all sports clubs. Since 14th Tournament in 1974, it has been treated as a major event in the university. 61st and 62nd Tournaments were cancelled during the COVID-19 pandemic, with 63rd being first held in 2022 after the pandemic, with Sophia winning 17-15 against Nanzan.

Since 2010, Sophia University and Sogang University have held an athletic and cultural exchange event called Sogang-Sophia Festival of Exchange (SOFEX).

Around 40 clubs are organized under the Sophia University Athletic Association. Those include:

- The Golden Eagles, an American football club, which was founded in 1969, and is currently a member of the Kantoh Collegiate Football Association, Division 2, Block B. They generally practice in the Sanadabori field, but during the rainy days they practice on the other premises or run around the Akasaka Palace. They are exclusively cheered by the Lollipoppers cheerleading team, which is not affiliated with the Athletic Association. The Lollipoppers practice outside the campus.
- The Ōendan is composed of a male lead section, a brass section, and "Eagles" cheerleading section. The Ōendan cheers for all sports clubs except for the Golden Eagles. Cheerleading section exercises in the underground Judo hall or in public facilities outside the campus.
- The Karate Club has included three winners in the All Japan Koshiki Karate Tournanment.
- The Baseball Club is currently a member of the Tohto University Baseball League Division 3.
- The Junko Baseball Club is a member of the Tohto University Junko Baseball League Division 3.
- The Women's Baseball Club is a member of the Kanto University Women's Baseball League.
- The Tennis Club is a member of the Kanto Inter-collegiate Tennis Fenderation. The Men's section is in Division 4, and Women's section is in Division 5.
- The Soccer Club is a member of the Tokyo University Football Association, Division 1. They practice on the Sanadabori field.
- The Rugby Club is a member of the Japan East Rugby Football Union, League 1. They practice on the Sanadabori field.
- The Men's Basketball Club is a member of the Kanto College Basketball Federation, Division 3.

==== Sanadabori field ====
Baseball, Junko Baseball, Women's Baseball, American Football, Ground Hockey, Soccer, Rugby, Lacrosse, and Track and Field Clubs practice on the Sanadabori field adjacent to the Yotsuya campus. However, the field is owned and managed by the Tokyo Metropolitan Government and is open to the public on weekends and holidays, which means Sophian clubs do not have priority use rights.

=== Student housing and dormitories ===
Sophia University has student housing options and dormitories scattered throughout Tokyo. Events and various programmes are also organised by students and housing staff for the benefit of the housing community all year round.

List of Student Dormitories:

- Sophia Soshigaya International House (Male/Female)
- Sophia-Arrupe International Residence (Male/Female)
- Sophia Edogawa Men's Dormitory (Male)

Sophia University has a group of designated and recommended dormitories, which are owned and operated by various private housing companies.

List of Designated Dormitories Owned by Private Companies:

- Sophia Higashi Nakano Dormitory (Female) (Nakano Ward, Tokyo)
- Sophia Kasai International House (Female) (Edogawa Ward, Tokyo)
- Student House Luxlass (Male/Female) (Shinjuku Ward, Tokyo)

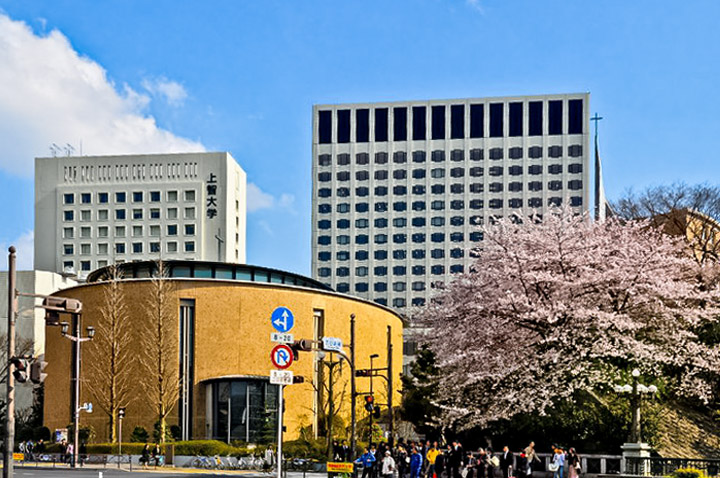
Sophia University, Yotsuya Campus, Tokyo, Japan.

== Academic rankings ==
University rankings
Global
THE	General	1501+
QS	General	951-1000

Regional
THE Asia (Asia version)	General	601+
QS Asia (Asia version)	General	=212

National

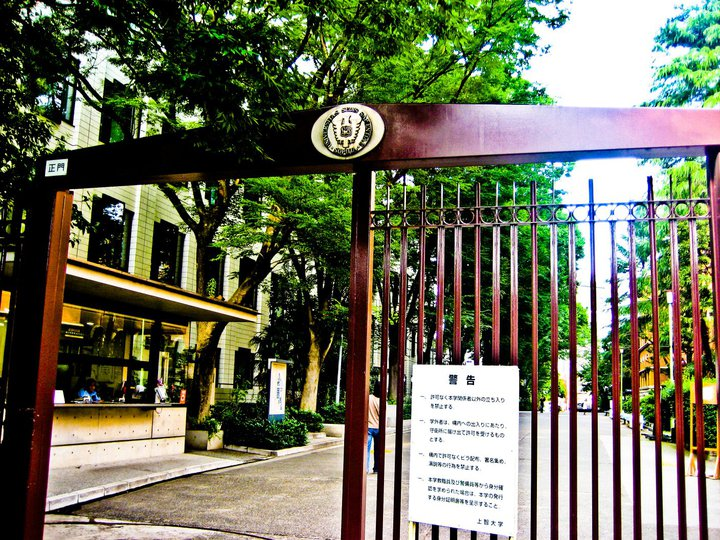
Sophia University.

There are several rankings below related to Sophia University.

=== University rankings ===
==== Japanese university rankings ====
According to the Times Higher Education 2021 Japan University Rankings, Sophia University is ranked 18th in the nation. Sophia is the fourth largest liberal arts university in the country.

==== Global/regional university rankings ====
According to the 2023 QS World University Rankings, Sophia University is ranked 801–1000. In the 2021 QS rankings, Sophia was 181st in Asia and the 28th in Japan. Its 2021 Times Higher Education Impact Ranking, which assesses universities against the United Nations Sustainable Development Goals (UN SDGs), is 601–800.

=== Alumni rankings ===
Alumni of Sophia have good employment prospects in Japanese industries. According to the Weekly Economist's 2010 rankings and the PRESIDENT's article on 2006/10/16, graduates from Sophia have the eighth best employment rate in 400 major companies, and the average graduate salary is the sixth best in Japan.

=== Popularity and selectivity ===
Admission to Sophia is highly selective and competitive. As such it is considered one of the top private universities along with Keio University and Waseda University. Typical acceptance rate is 34%. Its entrance difficulty is considered one of the toughest along with Waseda and Keio among 730 private universities.

== Overseas partner institutions ==
Sophia University has student and academic exchange agreements with 387 overseas partner universities in 81 countries and regions as of June 2021.

List of External University Agreements and Affiliations:

- Association of Southeast and East Asian Catholic Colleges and Universities (ASEACCU)
- Comprehensive Agreement on Cooperation with Kwansei Gakuin University
- Global 5 University Collaboration Agreement (with Waseda University, Akita International University, International Christian University, Ritsumeikan Asia Pacific University)
- Comprehensive Agreement on Cooperation with International Christian University
- Member of the Catholic University Institute for Christian Culture

== Notable faculty ==
- Father Peter Milward, SJ, emeritus professor of English Literature
- Gregory Clark, former professor of economics; currently a Japan Times contributor
- Kuniko Inoguchi, former professor of law, and Permanent Representative of Japan to the Conference on Disarmament in Geneva
- Jun-ichi Nishizawa, electronic engineer, inventor and specially-appointed professor;
- Sadako Ogata, former professor of political science, and former United Nations High Commissioner for Refugees; former President of the Japan International Cooperation Agency

== Notable alumni ==
=== Politics ===
- Morihiro Hosokawa, 79th Prime Minister of Japan
- Toshitsugu Saito, 65th and 66th Japanese Defence Minister
- Koichiro Genba, former Japanese Foreign Minister
- Seiko Noda, former Minister-in-charge of Measures against Declining Birthrate
- Kuniko Inoguchi, Japan's first Minister of State for Gender Equality and Social Affairs
- Denny Tamaki, 8th Governor of Okinawa
- Takuya Hirai, former Minister for Digital Transformation
- Carlos Holmes Trujillo, former Foreign Minister and Defence Minister of Colombia
- Rizal Ramli, former Finance Minister of Indonesia
- Yukari Sato, economist and LDP Member of the House of Representatives
- Shoichi Kondo, DPJ Member of the House of Representatives and former Senior Vice Minister for the Environment
- Li Linsi, Chinese diplomat, educator, diplomatic consultant to Chiang Kai-shek
- Mukhriz Mahathir, 11th and 13th Menteri Besar of Kedah, Malaysia
- Benigno Aquino III, 15th President of the Philippines
- Antolin Oreta III, incumbent Member of the Philippine House of Representatives from Malabon's Lone District and former Mayor of Malabon and Vice Mayor of Malabon

=== Academia ===
- Ruben Habito, associate professor at Southern Methodist University
- Yuya Kiuchi, sport and pop culture scholar at Michigan State University
- Fidel Nemenzo, mathematician, chancellor of University of the Philippines Diliman
- Junko Shigemitsu, theoretical physicist, emerita professor at Ohio State University
- Kyouichi Tachikawa, historian
- Takayuki Tatsumi, American literature scholar at Keio University
- Dominique Turpin, Dean & President of IMD, Switzerland
- Shōichi Watanabe, English scholar

=== Business ===
- Hassan Jameel, President and Vice Chairman of Abdul Latif Jameel
- Johnny Kitagawa, founder and CEO of Johnny & Associates
- Shawn Layden, President & CEO of Sony Interactive Entertainment America
- Peer Schneider, co-founder and SVP/Publisher at IGN Entertainment
- Shuzo Shiota, CEO and president of Polygon Pictures

=== Media and literature ===
- Jake Adelstein, journalist, consultant, and author of Tokyo Vice
- Beni Arashiro, singer
- Yoshitaka Asama, screenwriter and film director
- Benjamin Fulford, investigative journalist
- Vernon Grant, first American cartoonist to introduce manga concepts to English-language readers
- Boyé Lafayette De Mente, author on Japanese culture ('54)
- Desiree Lim, Malaysian-born Canadian independent film director, producer, and screenwriter
- Kōichi Mashimo, anime director, founder of studio Bee Train
- Toru Minegishi, video game composer
- Ken-ichi Suzuki, songwriter, singer and bassist (Ningen Isu)
- Yuriko Nishiyama, manga writer, including Harlem Beat
- Maureen Wartski, author, including A Boat to Nowhere and Yuri's Brush with Magic
- Robert Whiting, author on Japanese culture, including The Chrysanthemum and the Bat and You Gotta Have Wa about Japanese baseball
- Yūki Yamato, Japanese screenwriter and director
- Tadatoshi Fujimaki, Manga artist and creator of Kuroko's Basketball
- Anna Sawai, New Zealand-born Japanese actress, singer, and dancer
- Koichiro Shima, creative director
- Sumire Uesaka, voice actress and singer

=== Others ===
- Agnes Chan, singer and ambassador of the Japan Committee for UNICEF
- Kurara Chibana, Miss Japan 2006 and first Runner-up at Miss Universe 2006
- Tina Chow, model and jewellery designer
- Bruce Frantzis, Taoist Master, USA
- Yū Hayami, actress, singer
- Carrie Ann Inaba, American dancer, choreographer, actress, and singer
- Hisashi Inoue, author
- Maiko Itai, Miss Universe Japan 2010 winner
- Crystal Kay, singer
- Stephen Kim Sou-hwan, Korean Roman Catholic cardinal and Archbishop of Seoul
- Peter Shirayanagi, Japanese Roman Catholic cardinal and Archbishop of Tokyo
- Saori Kumi, author
- Alan Merrill, a 1960s Group Sounds pioneer gaijin tarento and later composer of the classic song "I Love Rock N Roll"
- Osamu Mizutani, high school teacher, famous for his book "Yomawari Sensei" and his efforts to redress delinquents
- Father Adolfo Nicolás, S.J., Superior General of the Society of Jesus
- Hikaru Nishida, actress, Japanese drama
- Judy Ongg, singer/actor
- Zomahoun Idossou Rufin, a gaijin tarento, philanthropist and diplomat who has been Benin's Ambassador to Japan and the Philippines
- Emyli, singer
- George Takei, Japanese-American actor most famous for his role as Star Trek's Mr. Sulu
- Tadashi Yamamoto, Founder of the Japan Center for International Exchange and the Shimoda Conference
- Michelle van Eimeren, Miss Universe Australia 1994

== See also ==
- Education in Japan
- Catholic Education
- Japanese Educational System
- History of the Catholic Church in Japan
- List of Jesuit sites
- Society of Jesus (Jesuits) in Japan
- Catholic Church in Japan
- Christianity in Japan
- List of Jesuit Educational Institutions
