= Shigemitsu =

- Gender: Male

Origin
- Origin: Japanese
- Meaning: Different meanings depending on the kanji used

Shigemitsu (written: 茂光 or 重光) is a masculine Japanese given name. Notable people with the name include:

- Shigemitsu Dandō (團藤 重光) (1913–2012), Japanese judge and academic
- Shigemitsu Egawa (江川 重光) (born 1966), Japanese footballer
- Shigemitsu Sudo (須藤 茂光) (born 1956), Japanese footballer

Shigemitsu (written: 重光) is also a Japanese surname. Notable people with the surname include:

- Akio Shigemitsu (重光 昭夫) (born 1955), Japanese-South Korean businessman
- Junko Shigemitsu (born 1949), Japanese-American physicist
- Mamoru Shigemitsu (重光 葵) (1887–1957), Japanese diplomat, politician and war criminal
- Takaki Shigemitsu (重光 貴葵) (born 1983), Japanese footballer
