= Brian Bond =

British military historian (1936–2025)

Brian James Bond (17 April 1936 – 2 June 2025) was a British military historian and professor emeritus of military history at King's College London.

== Early life and education ==
The son of Edward Herbert Bond and his wife, Olive Bessie Sartin, Bond was born in Marlow, Buckinghamshire, where he attended Sir William Borlase's Grammar School from 1947 to 1954. He was raised in Buckinghamshire where his father was the gardener for the military historian Sir Basil Liddell Hart. Hart took a great interest in the boy and encouraged his academic interests. From 1952 to 1954, Bond served in the Royal Artillery, being commissioned a second lieutenant in the British Army. In 1959, he took an honours degree in history at Worcester College, Oxford and then went on to take his Master of Arts degree in war studies at King's College London in 1962. He married Madeleine Joyce Carr in 1962.

== Academic career ==
Bond's first academic post in 1961 was as lecturer in history at the University of Exeter. In 1962, he moved to become lecturer in history at the University of Liverpool, where he remained for four years. In 1966, he became lecturer in war studies at King's College London. He was promoted to reader in war studies in 1978, professor of military history in 1986, and professor emeritus in 2001.

Bond served as visiting professor at the University of Western Ontario in 1972–73 and was visiting lecturer at the U.S. Naval War College in 1972–74. He was made a Fellow of King's College London in 1996 and served as Liddell Hart Lecturer. He was visiting fellow at Brasenose College, Oxford in 1992–93 and, in 2000, was visiting fellow at All Souls College, Oxford and Lees Knowles Lecturer at Cambridge University.

Bond served as a member of council of the Society for Army Historical Research and as President of the British Commission for Military History.

== Death ==
Bond died on 2 June 2025, at the age of 89.

== Honours ==
- Named a Society for Army Historical Research Fellow, 2023

== Published works ==
- Victorian military campaigns edited by Brian Bond. London: Hutchinson, [1967].
- Mapledurham House, the historic home of the Blount family: official guide: history and description of contents. Derby: English Life Publications, 1968.
- The Victorian army and the Staff College, 1854–1914, London: Eyre Methuen, 1972.
- Chief of staff: the diaries of Lieutenant General Sir Henry Pownall, edited by Brian Bond. London: Leo Cooper, 1972–1974.
- France and Belgium, 1939–1940 London: Davis-Poynter, 1975; Second edition under the title Britain, France and Belgium, 1939–1940 Oxford: Brassey's, 1990.
- War and society: a yearbook of military history edited by Brian Bond and Ian Roy. 2 volumes. London: Croom Helm, 1975–1977; New York: Holmes & Meier, 1975–1977.
- Liddell Hart: a study of his military thought. London: Cassell, 1977; New Brunswick: Rutgers University Press, 1977; Aldershot: Gregg Revivals in association with Department of War Studies, King's College London, 1991.
- British military policy between the two world wars, Oxford: Clarendon Press; New York: Oxford University Press, 1980
- War and society in Europe, 1870–1970 [Leicester]: Leicester University Press, in association with Fontana Paperbacks, 1983; London: Fontana Paperbacks, 1984; New York: St. Martin's Press, 1983; Stroud: Sutton, 1998.
- Staff officer: the diaries of Walter Guinness (first Lord Moyne), 1914–1918, edited by Brian Bond and Simon Robbins. London: Leo Cooper, 1987.
- The First World War and British military history, edited by Brian Bond. Oxford: Clarendon Press, 1991.
- Fallen stars: eleven studies of twentieth century military disasters, edited by Brian Bond. London: Brassey's Naval Annual (UK), 1991.
- The pursuit of victory: from Napoleon to Saddam Hussein, Oxford: Oxford University Press, 1996, 1998.
- The nature of future conflict: implications for force development by Brian Holden Reid ... [et al.]; edited by Brian Bond and Mungo Melvin. The Occasional Papers. Strategic and Combat Studies Institute, no. 36. Camberley: Strategic and Combat Studies Institute, 1998.
- Look to your front: studies in the First World War by the British Commission for Military History; Brian Bond et al. Staplehurst: Spellmount, 1999.
- Haig: a reappraisal 70 years on, edited by Brian Bond and Nigel Cave. London: Leo Cooper, 1999.
- Haig: a reappraisal 80 years on, edited by Brian Bond and Nigel Cave. Barnsley, Pen and Sword Books, 2009.
- The battle of France and Flanders 1940: sixty years on, edited by Brian Bond and Michael D. Taylor. Barnsley: Leo Cooper, 2001.
- The unquiet Western Front: Britain's role in literature and history. Cambridge: Cambridge University Press, 2002.
- The British General Staff: reform and innovation c.1890-1939, edited by David French and Brian Holden Reid in honour of: Brian Bond. London: Frank Cass, 2002.
- British and Japanese military leadership in the Far Eastern War, 1941–1945, edited by Brian Bond and Kyouichi Tachikawa. London: Frank Cass, 2004.
- The war memoirs of Earl Stanhope, General Staff Officer in France, 1914–1918 by Lieutenant Colonel Earl Stanhope, edited by Brian Bond. Brighton: Tom Donovan Editions, 2006.
- Military historian: My part in the birth and development of War Studies 1966-2016, Solihull, West Midlands: Helion and Company, 2018.
