= Pedro Arrupe Training Center for Leaders and Educators =

Coordinates: 52°9′14.58″N 21°12′42.21″E

Pedro Arrupe Training Center for Leaders and Educators Centrum Kształcenia Liderów i Wychowawców im. Pedro Arrupe
- Abbreviation: Arrupe Center
- Established: 1997; 29 years ago
- Headquarters: 04-984 Warsaw, Olecko 30 Poland
- Region served: Worldwide
- Director: Wojciech Żmudziński
- Affiliations: Jesuit, Catholic
- Staff: Seven, and forty trainers
- Website: ArrupeCenter

Pedro Arrupe Training Center for Leaders and Educators (Arrupe Center) was founded by the Society of Jesus in 1997 to train teachers according to the principles of Ignatian Pedagogy and multiculturalism. Headquartered in Warsaw, Poland, its work has extended to formation of leaders of NGOs and of educational institutions throughout Poland and abroad.
