= Kyōichi =

- Gender: Male

Origin
- Origin: Japanese
- Meaning: Different meanings depending on the kanji used

Kyōichi, Kyoichi or Kyouichi (written: 恭一, 教一, 強一 or 京一) is a masculine Japanese given name. Notable people with the name include:

- Kyoichi Inoue (井上 強一; born 1935), Japanese aikidoka
- Kyoichi Katayama (片山 恭一; born 1959), Japanese writer
- Kyoichi Kijima (木嶋 恭一; born 1951), Japanese academic
- Kyoichi Mori (森 恭一), Japanese whale watcher
- Kyōichi Sawada (沢田 教一; 1936–1970), Japanese photographer
- Kyouichi Tachikawa (立川 京一; born 1966), Japanese historian
