= Taiichirō Nishikawa =

Japanese politician (1942–2026)

- 西川 太一郎
- Official portrait, 2002

Mayor of Arakawa
- In office 15 November 2004 – 13 November 2024
- Preceded by: Shikō Fujisawa
- Succeeded by: Gaku Takiguchi

Member of the House of Representatives
- In office 19 July 1993 – 10 October 2003
- Preceded by: Kazuko Yoshida
- Succeeded by: Midori Matsushima
- Constituency: Tokyo 6th (1993–1996); Tokyo 14th (1996–2003)

Member of the Tokyo Metropolitan Assembly
- In office 23 July 1977 – 2 July 1993
- Constituency: Arakawa Ward

Personal details
- Born: 27 May 1942 Arakawa, Tokyo, Japan
- Died: 5 July 2026 (aged 84) Arakawa, Tokyo, Japan
- Party: Independent (after 2003)
- Other political affiliations: NLC (1977–1986); LDP (1986–1993); JRP (1993–1994); NFP (1994–1998); LP (1998–2000); NCP (2000–2003)
- Education: Waseda University (BCom); Seigakuin University
- Occupation: Civil servant

Taiichirō Nishikawa (Japanese: 西川太一郎 Nishikawa Taiichirō; 27 May 1942 – 5 July 2026) was a Japanese politician. A member of multiple political parties, he served in the House of Representatives from 1993 to 2003.

Nishikawa died in Tokyo on 5 July 2026, at the age of 84.
