= Tokyo 23rd district =

Electoral district in Tokyo, Japan

Tokyo 23rd District
- 東京都第23区
- Parliamentary constituency for the Japanese House of Representatives
- Prefecture: Tokyo
- Proportional District: Tokyo
- Electorate: 262,390 (as of 1 September 2022)

Current constituency
- Created: 1994
- Seats: One
- Party: LDP
- Representative: Shinichirō Kawamatsu

Tokyo 23rd Ward (東京都第23区, Tokyo dai-ni-jusan-ku) is an electoral district in the Japanese House of Representatives. The district was established in 1994 at the introduction of the single member constituency system.

== Areas covered ==
=== Current district ===
As of 12 January 2023, the areas that are covered by this district are as follows:

- Machida

As part of the 2022 reapportionments, the remaining sections of Tama were given to the new 30th district. As a result of this the 23rd district became the only district in Western Tokyo to be composed of a single municipality.

=== Areas 2017–2022 ===
Between the first redistricting in 2017 and the second redistricting in 2022, the areas covered by this district were as follows:

- Machida
- Parts of Tama
  - Sekido 5 (excluding 1-8 & 13-31), Sekido 6, Kaitori, Gouda, Wada, Mogusa, Ochikawa, Higashiterakata, Sakuragaoka 1-4, Hijirigaoka 1 (1-24, 35, Excluding 44), Umabikizawa 1-2, Sannoshita, Nakazawa, Karakida, Suwa 1-6, Nagayama 1-7, Kaitori 1-5, Toyogaoka 1-6, Ochiai 1-6 Chome, Tsurumaki 1-6, Minamino 1-3, Higashi Terakata 3, Wada 3, Atago 1-4

As part of the 2017 redistricting, part of Tama was transferred to the 21st district.

=== Areas from before 2017 ===
From the districts creation in 1994 and its first redistricting in 2017, the areas covered by this district were as follows:

- Machida
- Tama

== Elected representatives ==
Representative	Party	Years served	Notes
Kosuke Ito	LDP	1996 – 2009	Lost re-election in the 2009 general election. He initially intended to run again as an independent in 2012, after the Liberal Democratic nomination was given to Masanobu Ogura. However, he withdrew his candidacy to support the candidacy of his son, Shunsuke Ito, who was running for the Japan Restoration Party.
Mari Kushibuchi	DPJ	2009 – 2012	Lost re-election in the 2012 general election. She was later chosen to replace Tarō Yamamoto in the Tokyo PR district after he resigned, since she had been the next highest Reiwa Shinsengumi member in the 2021 general election. She currently serves in the seat as a co-representative with Akiko Oishi at the recommendation of Yamamoto.
Masanobu Ogura	LDP	2012 – 2024	
Shunsuke Ito	CDP	2024 – 2026	
Shinichirō Kawamatsu	LDP	2026 –	

== Election results ==
‡ - Also ran in the Tokyo PR district

‡‡ - Also ran in the Tokyo PR district and won.

2026
Party	Candidate	Votes	%	±%
LDP	Shinichirō Kawamatsu	92,171	45.3	▲7.8
Centrist Reform	Shunsuke Ito	69,908	34.4	▼14.7
Sanseitō	Yūki Funami	22,326	11.0	
JCP	Yūichi Ikegawa	19,111	9.4	
Registered electors		361,249		
Turnout			57.79	▲2.08
LDP gain from Centrist Reform				

2024
Party	Candidate	Votes	%	±%
CDP	Shunsuke Ito (PR incumbent)	111,851	59.03	▲10.28
LDP	Osamu Yoshiwara (incumbent)	71,154	37.55	▼11.20
Mintsuku	AI Mayor	6,475	3.42	
Registered electors		361,197		
Turnout		189,480	55.71	▼2.66

2021
Party	Candidate	Votes	%	±%
LDP	Masanobu Ogura^{‡} (incumbent) (endorsed by Komeito)	133,206	51.3	▲6.3
CDP	Shunsuke Ito^{‡‡} (incumbent - Tokyo PR) (endorsed by Reiwa Shinsengumi and the SDP Tokyo branch)	126,732	48.8	New
Registered electors		458,998		
Turnout		268,055	58.4	▲2.6
LDP hold		Swing	▲5.1	

2017
Party	Candidate	Votes	%	±%
LDP	Masanobu Ogura^{‡} (incumbent) (endorsed by Komeito)	110,522	45.0	▲3.8
Kibō no Tō	Shunsuke Ito^{‡}	76,450	31.1	New
JCP	Ryosuke Matsumura	58,929	24.0	▲10.2
Registered electors		455,437		
Turnout		254,088	55.8	▼0.2
LDP hold		Swing	▲7.4	

2014
Party	Candidate	Votes	%	±%
LDP	Masanobu Ogura^{‡} (incumbent) (endorsed by Komeito)	104,709	41.2	▲11.0
Democratic	Mari Kushibuchi^{‡} (endorsed by Greens Japan)	63,706	25.0	▲2.9
Restoration	Shunsuke Ito^{‡}	50,836	20.0	▼0.5
JCP	Ryosuke Matsumura	35,166	13.8	▲6.5
Registered electors		466,399		
Turnout		261,370	56.0	▼8.3
LDP hold		Swing	▲8.0	

2012
Party	Candidate	Votes	%	±%
LDP	Masanobu Ogura^{‡} (endorsed by Komeito)	87,192	30.2	▼4.9
Democratic	Mari Kushibuchi^{‡} (endorsed by the PNP)	63,969	22.1	▼32.3
Restoration	Shunsuke Ito^{‡}	59,166	20.5	New
Your	Tetsuya Shirakawa	39,676	13.7	New
JCP	Ryosuke Matsumara	21,006	7.3	▼1.7
Tomorrow	Takashi Ishii^{‡}	18,125	6.3	New
Registered electors		463, 214		
Turnout		297,800	64.3	▼4.5
LDP gain from Democratic		Swing	▼12.3	

2009
Party	Candidate	Votes	%	±%
Democratic	Mari Kushibuchi^{‡}	168,346	54.4	▲18.3
LDP	Kosuke Ito^{‡} (incumbent) (endorsed by Komeito)	108,528	35.1	▼19.6
JCP	Yoshiyasu Furuhashi	27,699	9.0	▼0.2
Happiness Realization	Youhei Matsuo	4,885	1.6	New
Registered electors		461,006		
Turnout		317,080	68.8	▲0.8
Democratic gain from LDP		Swing	▲12.3	

2005
Party	Candidate	Votes	%	±%
LDP	Kosuke Ito^{‡} (incumbent)	162,351	54.7	▲6.2
Democratic	Eiko Ishige^{‡} (incumbent - Tokyo PR)	107,136	36.1	▼6.2
JCP	Tomohide Murotani	27,232	9.2	0.0
Registered electors		445,766		
Turnout		302,898	68.0	▲6.9
LDP hold		Swing	▲7.6	

2003
Party	Candidate	Votes	%	±%
LDP	Kosuke Ito^{‡} (incumbent)	126,221	48.5	▲8.9
Democratic	Eiko Ishige^{‡‡} (incumbent - Tokyo PR)	110,266	42.3	▲7.9
JCP	Junichiro Imamura	23,943	9.2	▼5.1
Registered electors		437,355		
Turnout		267,268	61.1	▼1.8
LDP hold		Swing	▲5.1	

2000
Party	Candidate	Votes	%	±%
LDP	Kosuke Ito^{‡} (incumbent)	100,271	39.6	▲1.2
Democratic	Eiko Ishige^{‡‡} (incumbent - Tokyo PR)	87,232	34.4	▲14.0
JCP	Yoko Sato	36,113	14.3	▼4.1
Liberal	Akihisa Nagao^{‡}	20,986	8.3	New
Independent	Mitsuyoshi Tsukahara	6,172	2.4	New
Liberal League	Yutaka Yamaguchi	2,570	1.0	▼0.7
Registered electors		413,515		
Turnout		266,518	62.9	▲5.0
LDP hold		Swing		

1996
Party	Candidate	Votes	%	±%
LDP	Kosuke Ito^{‡} (incumbent - former Tokyo 11th district)	85,035	38.4	New
New Frontier	Maki Kitasato	46,821	21.1	New
Democratic	Junjiro Sase^{‡}	45,182	20.4	New
JCP	Hajime Kurosawa	40,870	18.4	New
Liberal League	Yoshio Minemura^{‡}	3,686	1.7	New
Registered electors		393,558		
Turnout		227,791	57.9	N/A
LDP win (new seat)				
