= Tokyo 14th district =

Japanese House of Representatives constituency

Tokyo 14th District
- Parliamentary constituency for the Japanese House of Representatives
- Numbered map of inner Tokyo single-member districts
- Prefecture: Tokyo
- Proportional District: Tokyo

Current constituency
- Created: 1994
- Seats: One
- Party: LDP
- Representative: Midori Matsushima
- Wards: Sumida and parts of Edogawa

Tokyo's 14th district is a single-member electoral district of the Japanese House of Representatives, the lower house of the national National Diet.

It has been held by Midori Matsushima from the Liberal Democratic Party since 2012.

== Areas covered ==
=== Current district ===
As of 20 January 2023, the areas covered by this district are as follows:

- Sumida
- Edogawa
  - Chūō 4, Matsushima 1-4, Higashi Komatsugawa 1-4, Nishi Komatsugawa, Okinomiya, Kamiishiki 1-3, Honisshiki 1-3, within the jurisdiction of the central ward office
  - Within the Komatsugawa and Koiwa offices

As part of the 2022 redistricting, the areas of Taitō were given back to the 2nd district, Arakawa was given to the new 29th district and the district gained parts of Edogawa from the 16th and 17th districts.

=== Areas 2017–2022 ===
From the first redistricting in 2017 until the second redistricting in 2022, the areas covered by this district were as follows:

- Parts of Taitō
  - Higashi-Ueno 6, Shitaya 2 (13-1-5, 14-24, 14-15-24), Iriya 1 (1-3, 9-14, 21-28, 32 and 33) Iriya 2 1-33, Matsugaya 1-4, Nishi-Asakusa 2-3, Asakusa 2 (13-27), Asakusa 3-7, Senzoku 1, Senzoku 2 (1-32), Senzoku 3-4, Imado 1/2, Higashi-Asakusa 1/2, Hashiba 1/2 ,Kiyokawa 1/2, Nihon Tsutsumi 1, Nihon Tsutsumi 2 (1-35)
- Sumida
- Arakawa

As part of the 2017 redistricting, parts of Taitō were transferred from the 2nd district.

=== Areas from before 2017 ===
From the creation of the district in 1994 and the first redistricting in 2017, the areas covered by this district were as follows:

- Sumida
- Arakawa

== Elected representatives ==
| Representative | Party | Years served | Notes |
|---|---|---|---|
| Taiichirō Nishikawa | NFP | 1996 – 2000 | |
| Taiichirō Nishikawa | NCP | 2000 – 2003 | |
| Midori Matsushima | LDP | 2003 – 2009 | |
| Taketsuka Kimura | DPJ | 2009 – 2012 | |
| Midori Matsushima | LDP | 2012 – | |

== Election results ==
2026
| Party | Candidate | Votes | % | ±% |
|---|---|---|---|---|
| LDP | Midori Matsushima | 109,892 | 50.23 | ▲13.88 |
| DPP | Takanori Chonan | 49,312 | 22.54 | ▼2.96 |
| Reiwa | Mari Kushibuchi | 20,647 | 9.44 | ▼2.70 |
| Sanseitō | Tan Yu | 19,925 | 9.11 | ▲4.22 |
| JCP | Tsutomu Hara | 20,987 19,007 | 8.69 | ▼1.37 |
| Turnout | | 218,783 | 56.91 | ▲3.28 |
| LDP hold | | | | |

2024
| Party | Candidate | Votes | % | ±% |
|---|---|---|---|---|
| LDP | Midori Matsushima | 75,862 | 36.3 | ▼7.0 |
| DPP | Nana Itō | 53,211 | 25.5 | |
| Reiwa | Mari Kushibuchi (elected by PR) | 25,328 | 12.1 | |
| Ishin | Kayo Saitō | 21,628 | 10.4 | ▼9.3 |
| JCP | Tsutomu Hara | 20,987 | 10.1 | |
| Sanseitō | Yasurō Ooka | 10,210 | 4.9 | |
| Independent | Kikuo Ootsuka | 1,481 | 0.7 | ▼0.4 |
| Turnout | | | 53.63 | ▼2.33 |
| LDP hold | | | | |

2021
| Party | Candidate | Votes | % | ±% |
|---|---|---|---|---|
| LDP | Midori Matsushima | 108,681 | 43.3 | ▼3.6 |
| CDP | Taketsuka Kimura | 80,932 | 32.2 | |
| Ishin | Emi Nishimura | 49,517 | 19.7 | |
| Independent | Kazunori Yanamoto | 5,845 | 2.3 | |
| Independent | Hideyuki Takemoto | 3,364 | 1.3 | |
| Independent | Kikuo Ootsuka | 2,772 | 1.1 | ▼0.5 |
| Turnout | | | 55.96 | ▲4.18 |
| LDP hold | | | | |
