= Mari Kushibuchi =

Japanese politician (born 1967)

- 櫛渕 万里
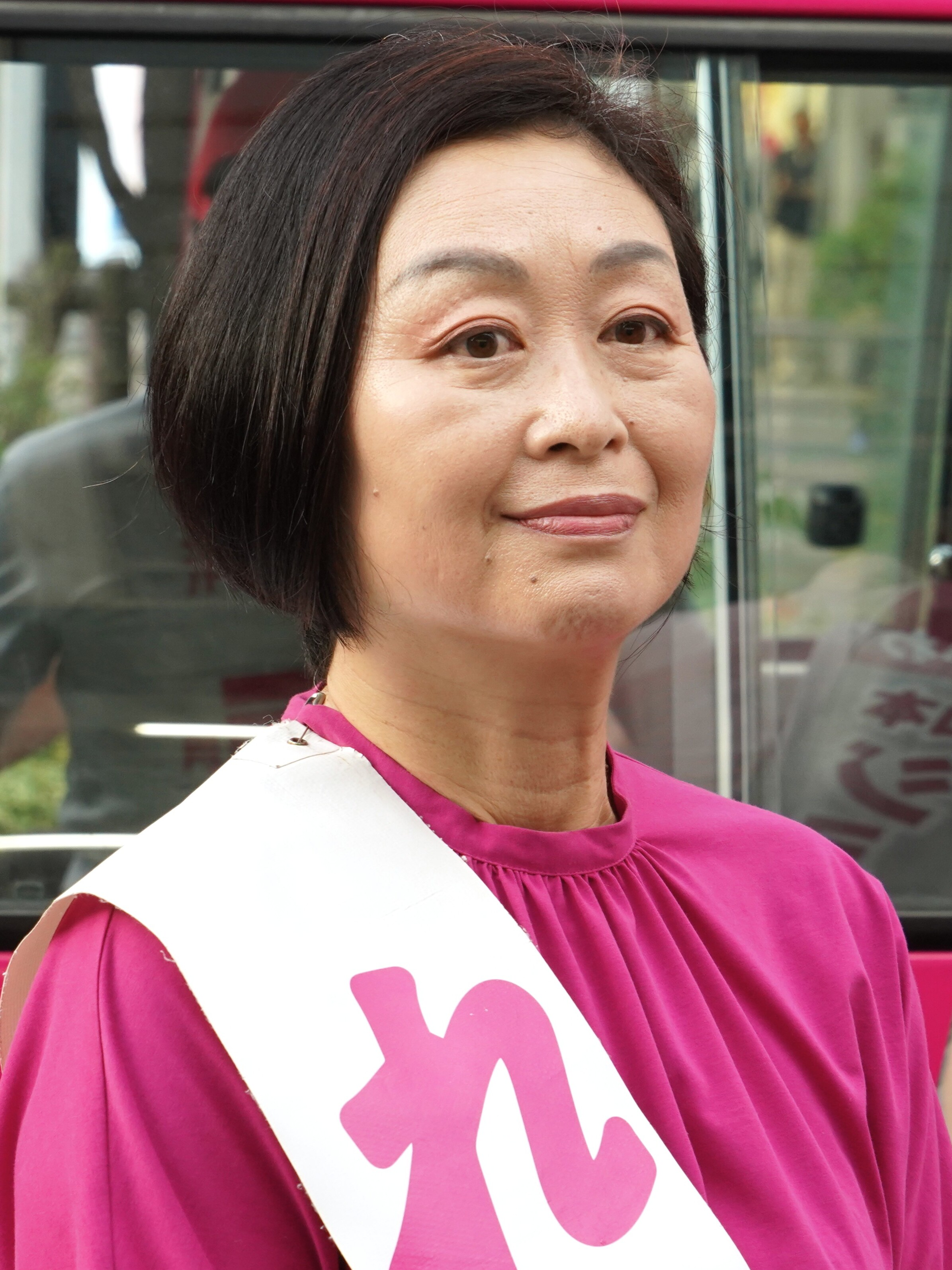
- Kushibuchi in 2025

Member of the House of Representatives
- In office 28 April 2022 – 23 January 2026
- Preceded by: Taro Yamamoto
- Succeeded by: Multi-member district
- Constituency: Tokyo PR
- In office 30 August 2009 – 16 November 2012
- Preceded by: Kosuke Ito
- Succeeded by: Masanobu Ogura
- Constituency: Tokyo 23rd

Personal details
- Born: 15 October 1967 (age 58) Numata, Gunma, Japan
- Party: Unaffiliated
- Other political affiliations: DPJ (2006–2016); DP (2016–2017); KnT (2017–2020); Reiwa Shinsengumi (2020–2026)
- Education: Rikkyo University

Mari Kushibuchi (櫛渕 万里, Kushibuchi Mari; born 15 October 1967) is a Japanese politician.

Kushibuchi sailed on the Peace Boat for the first time in 1990, and later joined the associated nongovernmental organization as an executive. In 2009, she contested her first House of Representatives election and won Tokyo's 23rd district for the Democratic Party of Japan. She succeeded incumbent Kōsuke Itō. Kushibuchi lost her 2012 reelection bid to Masanobu Ogura. Following the 2022 resignation of Tarō Yamamoto, Kushibuchi returned to the House of Representatives via proportional representation, this time as a member of Reiwa Shinsengumi.

On 1 June 2023, she was suspended from participating in the Diet for 10 days for "irregular behavior" in the lower chamber, which involved holding up a sheet of paper calling the no-confidence motion against Finance Minister Shun'ichi Suzuki a farce, while standing on the rostrum.

In the 2026 Japanese general election for the House of Representatives, held on February 8, 2026, Kushibuchi ran in Tokyo 14th district but lost. Following her defeat, she stepped down as co-leader of the party and assumed the role of deputy secretary-general. On 9 July 2026, alongside Taro Yamamoto's resignation as party leader of Reiwa Shinsengumi, Kushibuchi also left the party.
