= Seibo College =

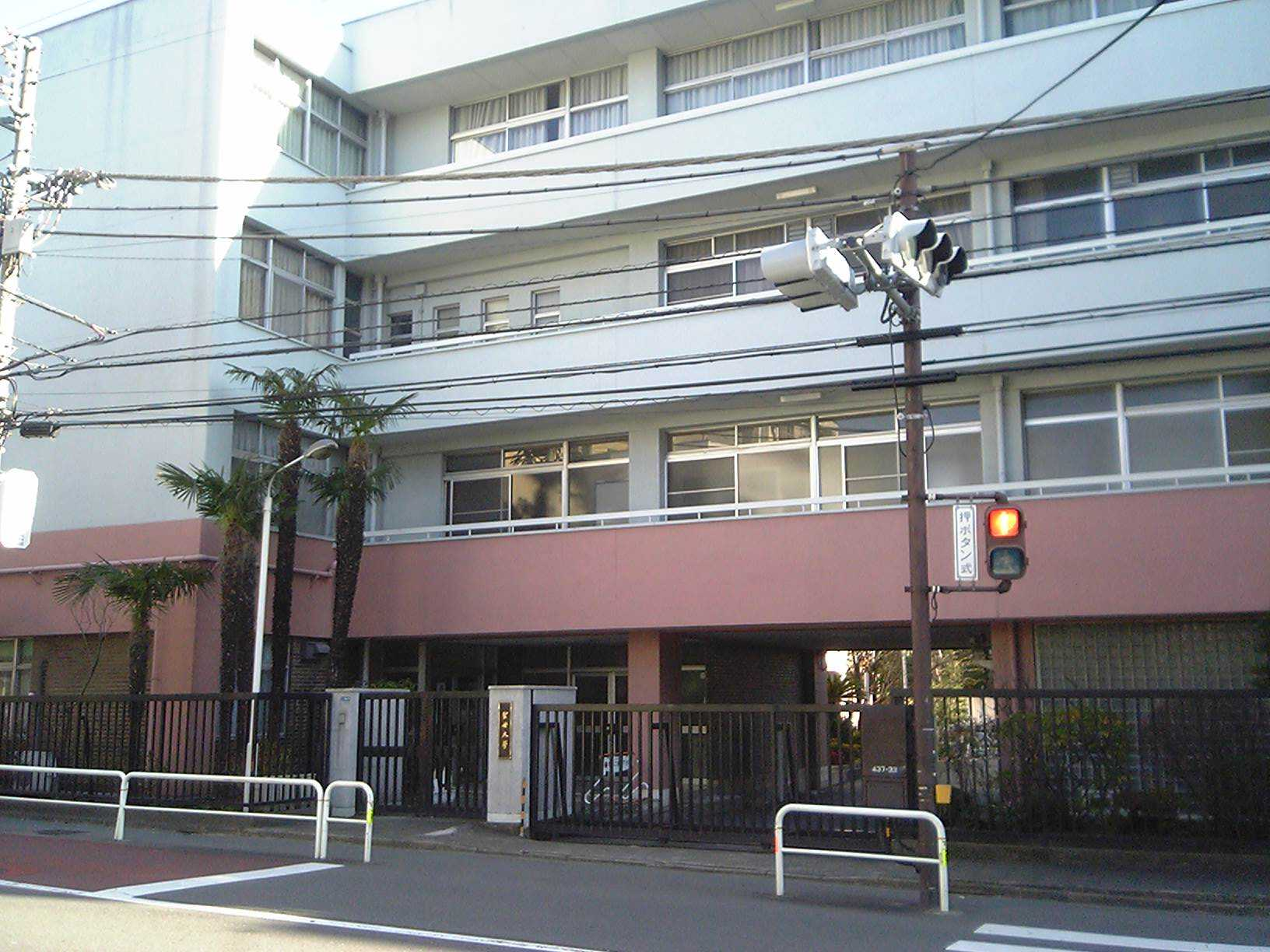
Seibo College

Seibo College (聖母大学, Seibo daigaku) was a private university in Shinjuku, Tokyo, Japan. The predecessor of the school was founded in 1948, and it was chartered as a junior college two years later. It became a four-year college in 2004. The school closed in 2014 and merged with the Sophia University. It was affiliated with the Seibo Hospital.
