= Koichiro Shima =

Japanese creative director

Koichiro Shima (嶋 浩一郎, Shima Kōichirō; born November 2, 1968) is a Japanese creative director and Co-CEO of the Hakuhodo Kettle.

== Career ==
He graduated Sophia University and started working in a corporate communication department at Hakuhodo in 1993. He was on loan to The Asahi Shimbun. He was an editorial director of “SEVEN”, which was a newspaper for younger readers sold at Starbucks and such. He was the chief editor of “Kokoku”, published by Hakuhodo from 2002 to 2004. He launched “Japan Booksellers’ Award” in 2004, currently a board member of the NPO Japan Booksellers’ Award committee. He founded the Hakuhodo Kettle in 2006.

He was involved in 50 years anniversary collaboration of Weekly Shonen Sunday and Weekly Shonen Magazine, KDDI, Itochu Corporation, “MOTTAINAI” ad campaign. Also, he was the chief editor of the culture magazine “Kettle” and an area news site “Akasaka Economic Press”. He has published “How Koichiro Shima Makes Ideas”, “The Planning Skills”, “This Tweet Better Be Memorized”, and “Editing Method That Activates People and Sell Goods – How to Make Brand ‘Media’".

== Works ==
- How Koichiro Shima Makes Ideas (Discover 21, 2007)
- The Planning Skills (Shoeisha, 2009)
- Editing Method That Activates People and Sell Goods – How to Make Brand ‘Media' (Seibundo Shinkosha, 2010)
- This Tweet better be memorized (Kodansha, 2010)
- Why You Come Up with Ideas in Book Stores (Shodensha, 2013)
