= Shunsuke Osaka =

Japanese former actor and singer (born 1982)

- 大坂 俊介
- Born: 6 June 1982 (age 44); Kanagawa Prefecture
- Occupations: Actor; singer
- Agent: 7teen Group
- Height: 178 cm (5 ft 10 in)

Shunsuke Osaka (大坂 俊介, Ōsaka Shunsuke; born 6 June 1982) is a Japanese former actor and singer. He is a former member of Johnny's Jr. He is a formerly represented with 7teen Group.

== Television appearances ==
=== Variety programmes/music programmes ===
Years	Title	Network	Notes
1995–98	Music Station	EX	Mainly as a back dancer of his senior groups such as KinKi Kids and V6. First appearance by Johnny's Jr. alone was 1997.
1996–98	Ai Love Junior	TX	
1997–98	Music Jump	NHK BS2	
1997	Mecha-Mecha Iketeru! SP "Okamura Offer ga Kimashita Series"	CX	
1997–98	Show-Men J	ABC	
1998–99	8-Jida J	EX	
1998	Gyu! To Dakishimetai!	NTV	

=== Dramas ===
Year	Title	Role	Network	Notes
1998	Harmonia: Kono Ai no Hate	Takeshi Higashino	NTV	
1998	Boys Be... Jr.	Etsuo	NTV	Episode 2 "Kimi to Hisokani Ishin Denshin!"; lead role
1998	Boys Be... Jr.	Masaki	NTV	Episode 6 "Imitation Couple"
1998	Boys Be... Jr.		NTV	Episode 7 "Ojama De Couple 5×5"
1998	Boys Be... Jr.		NTV	Episode 10 "Ike Teru Otoko Dai Kaizō Keikaku"
1998	Boys Be... Jr.	Takuya	NTV	Episode 11 "Hajimete no Giwaku!?"
2000	Ashita o Dakishimete	Hiroshi Ishida	NTV	
	Kazoku Ttenani?		FBS	
	Okoru Sōdan Shitsuchō: Ōoka Tamon no Jiken Nisshi		TBS	Co-starred with Monta Mino
	Watashi no Atama no Naka no Keshi Gomu: Another Letter		GyaO	

=== Documentary dramas ===
Date	Title	Role	Network
29 Oct 2009	Rubicon no Ketsudan	Tetsuya Yamaguchi	TX

== Stage ==
Dates	Title	Support	Co-stars	Location	Notes
	Princess Knight				Gekidan Star Cast performance; written and directed by Kanameshi Hoshi
	Eikoku Shōnenen				
	Decadance				
	Oinari Asakusa Ginko Monogatari		Nobuko Miyamoto		
	Mori Haikiteiru				
20–25 Jun 2006	Boys Review	Fuji Television		Tokyo Art Theater	
21–22 Oct 2006	Kazuhiro Teranishi Enshutsu ni Yoru Rōdoku Series Dai 1-dan –Ryunosuke Akutagawa o Yomu–		Sanyo Kanda, Takeshi Shinuchi	Nozomi Training School	
27–28 Jan 2007	Cross Sense		Toshiki Kashu, Shogen, Yujiro Shirakawa		Sponsored by Nippon TV
Jul–Aug 2007	The Sound of Music				As Rolf
23–27 Jul 2009	Shinjuku Midnight Baby	Yūkan Fuji, Sankei Shimbun, Sankei Sports, FujiSankei Business i., Goma Books	Issei Ishida, Misaki Saijo	Theatre Sunmall	Special appearance to commemorate the 15th anniversary of his entertainment career.

== Films ==
Date	Title	Notes	Ref.
	Heavens Door: Satsujin Shōkōgun		
	Jū Nana-sai		
2008	Urisen: Shinjuku Midnight Baby	Lead role	
12 Sep 2009	Daydream	Published and distributed by Art Port	
2010	Re:Play-Girls	As Jitsuhara (suicide guide)	

== Discography ==
Dates	Title	Location	Notes
29 Sep – 9 Oct 2006	Jacques Brel is Alive and Well and Living in Paris	Sunshine Theater	Co-starred with Mayo Kawasaki, Saori Mine, Chisa Yokoyama
	Hatsukoi		New song announcement
24 Sep 2006	59th Hadano Tobacco Festival Special Stage		
	39th Summer Jazz	Hibiya Public Hall	Lead role; organized by the Japan Musician Association
14 Jan 2007	Popular Music Festival in Hibiya	Hibiya Public Hall	Lead role; organized by the Japan Musician Association
26 Nov 2007	Toshima Public Hall Charity Concert		Guest appearance; sponsored by 7teen Group, Ishihara Corporation
