= Midori Matsushima =

Japanese politician (1956–present)

- 松島 みどり
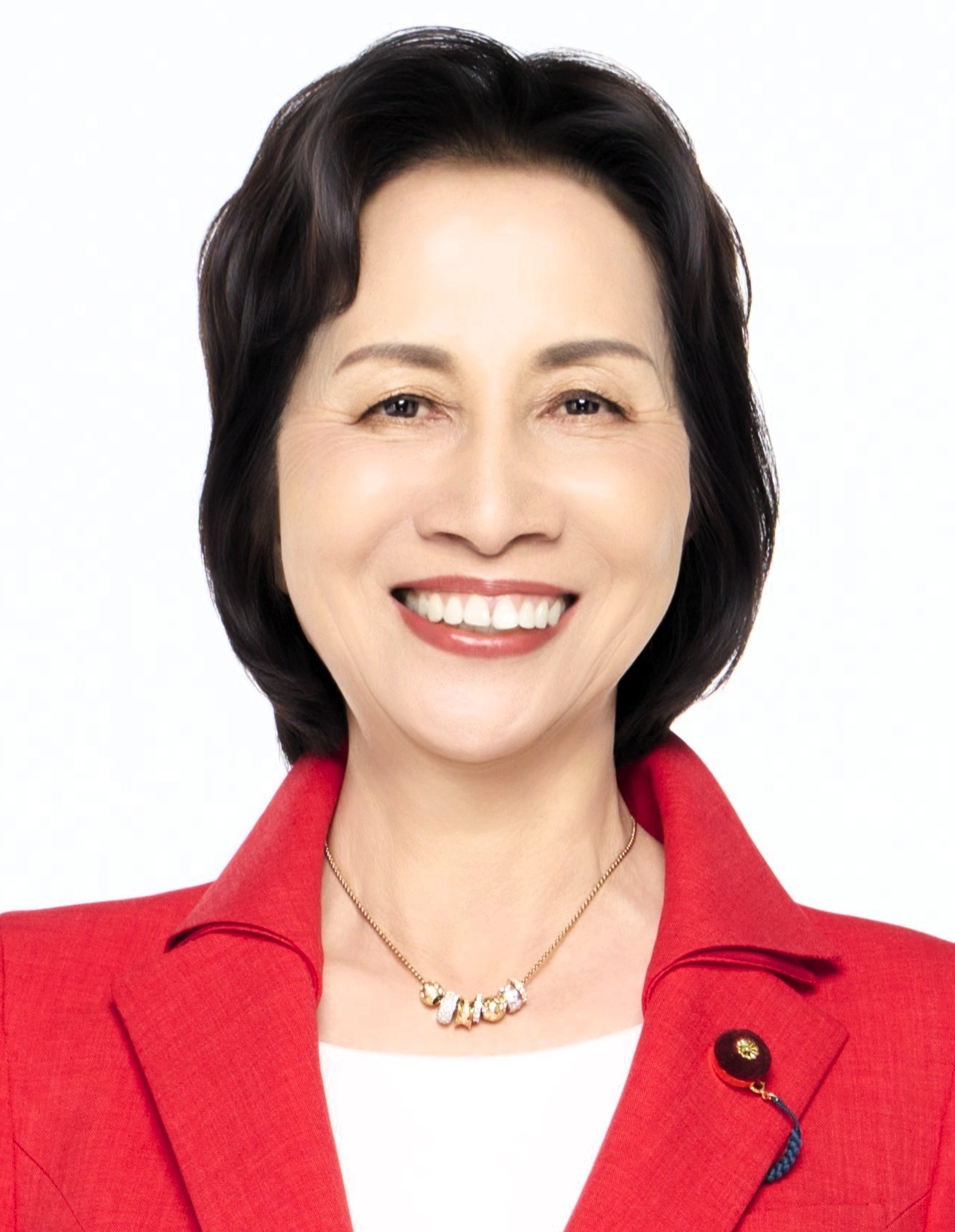
- Official portrait, 2025

Special Advisor to the Prime Minister (in charge of Foreign Nationals Policy)
- In office 21 October 2025 – 17 September 2026 Serving with Takahiro Inoue, Takashi Endo, Yoshimasa Uno, Sadamasa Oue
- Prime Minister: Sanae Takaichi
- Preceded by: Akihisa Nagashima; Masafumi Mori; Wakako Yata

Minister of Justice
- In office 3 September 2014 – 20 October 2014
- Prime Minister: Shinzo Abe
- Preceded by: Sadakazu Tanigaki
- Succeeded by: Yōko Kamikawa

Member of the House of Representatives
- Incumbent
- Assumed office 19 December 2012
- Preceded by: Taketsuka Kimura
- Constituency: Tokyo 14th
- In office 26 June 2000 – 21 July 2009
- Preceded by: Multi-member district
- Succeeded by: Taketsuka Kimura
- Constituency: Tokyo PR (2000–2003); Tokyo 14th (2003–2009)

Personal details
- Born: Midori Baba; 15 July 1956 (age 70) Toyonaka, Osaka, Japan
- Party: LDP (since 1995)
- Education: University of Tokyo
- Occupation: Reporter • Politician

Midori Matsushima (Japanese: 松島 みどり, Hepburn: Matsushima Midori; born 15 July 1956) also known by her legal name Midori Baba (馬場 みどり, Baba Midori) is a Japanese politician. She served as Japan's Minister of Justice in 2014, later resigning in the same year after an allegation of violating electoral laws by distributing paper fans to voters.

== Overview ==
Matsushima, hailing from Hyogo Prefecture and an alumnus of the University of Tokyo, initially worked for the Japanese national newspaper Asahi Shimbun from 1980 to 1995. Following an unsuccessful election attempt in 1996, she was elected to the House of Representatives for the first time in 2000, and subsequently re-elected in 2003 and 2005. She served as a member of the House of Representatives for the Liberal Democratic Party, representing Tokyo's 14th district in the Diet (national legislature) seven times.

== Resignation ==
Midori Matsushima resigned from her position as Japan's Minister of Justice in October 2014 due to allegations of violating election laws. Specifically, she was said to have distributed paper fans (uchiwa) with her name and image at a local festival, which was alleged to constitute a form of bribery under Japanese election law. This controversy led to significant political pressure, ultimately resulting in her resignation. Matsushima was cleared in January 2015 when the charges were dropped.

Political offices
Preceded by Sadakazu Tanigaki	Minister of Justice; 2014	Succeeded by Yōko Kamikawa
