= Hiroshima Academy Junior and Senior High School =

Hiroshima Gakuin Junior and Senior High School
- Japanese: 広島学院中学校・高等学校

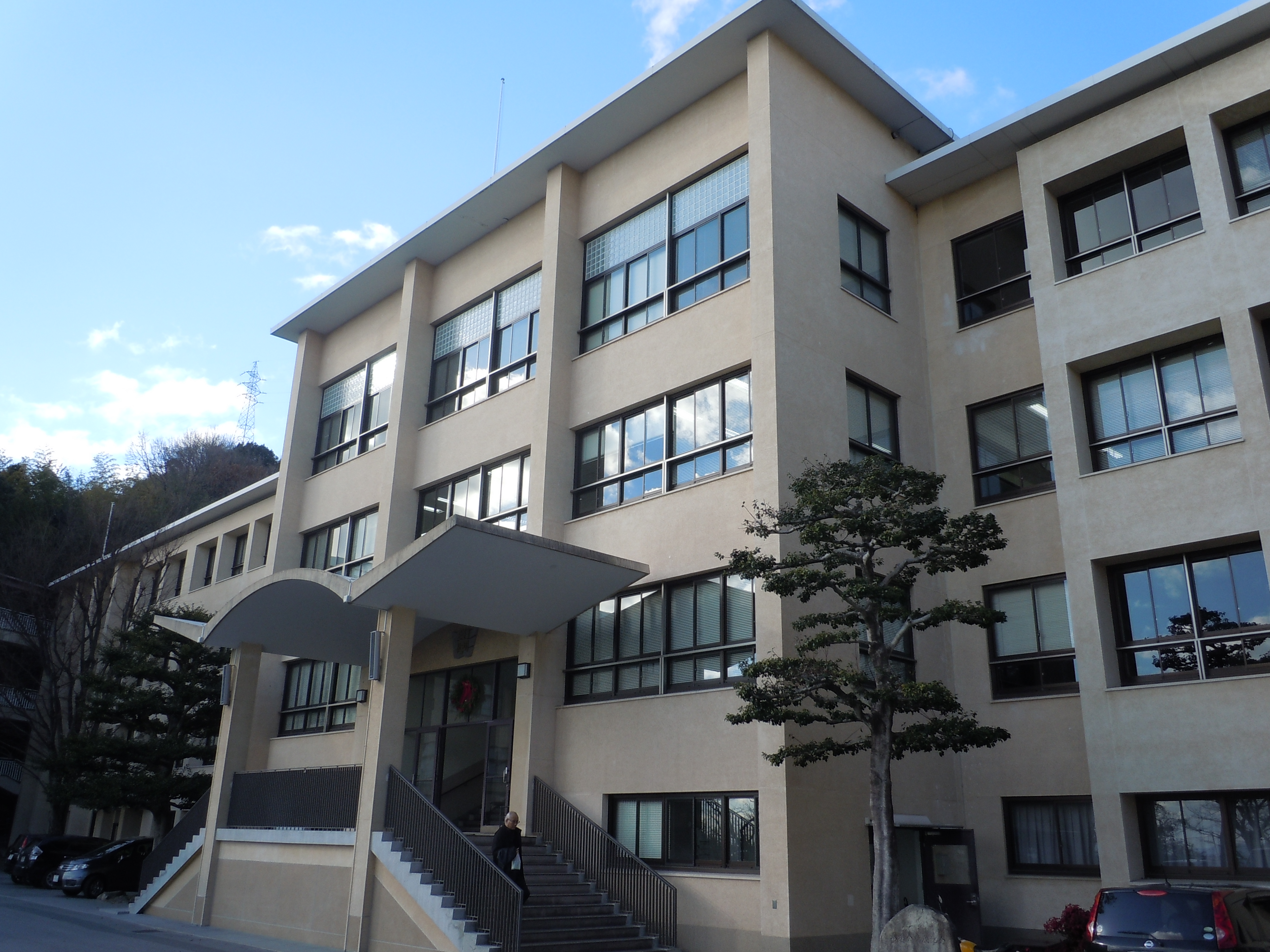

Location
- Hiroshima City, Hiroshima Prefecture; Japan; 34°23′39″N 132°24′29″E

Information
- Type: Private secondary school
- Religious affiliation: Catholicism
- Denomination: Jesuits
- Established: 1956; 70 years ago
- Principal: Yusuke Abe
- Gender: Boys
- Mascot: Gakumon
- Publication: Furoshiki
- Affiliation: Sophia University
- Website: www.hiroshimagakuin.ed.jp

Hiroshima Gakuin Junior and Senior High School (Japanese: 広島学院中学校・高等学校), is a private Catholic integrated middle and high school for boys, located in Hiroshima City, in the Hiroshima Prefecture, Japan. The school was established by the Jesuits in 1956.

== History ==
In 1956 the Society of Jesus established this as its third junior-senior high school in Japan. The school follows the broad objectives of Ignatian pedagogy, personal care for each student as an individual, and teamwork. It pursues the objective of training "men for and with others."

== Activities ==
The mountaineering club has done well in national tournaments and won the inter-high crown in 2007 and 2008. Other national prize-winning clubs at the school are for chemistry, computer programming (2008), and for Shogi. Also, in 2013 four medalists from the school brought home the gold medal from the International Biology Olympiad in Switzerland, where 240 students from 62 countries or regions worldwide participated.

== See also ==
- List of schools in Japan
- List of Jesuit schools
