= Shunsuke Ito (politician) =

Japanese politician (born 1979)

- 伊藤 俊輔
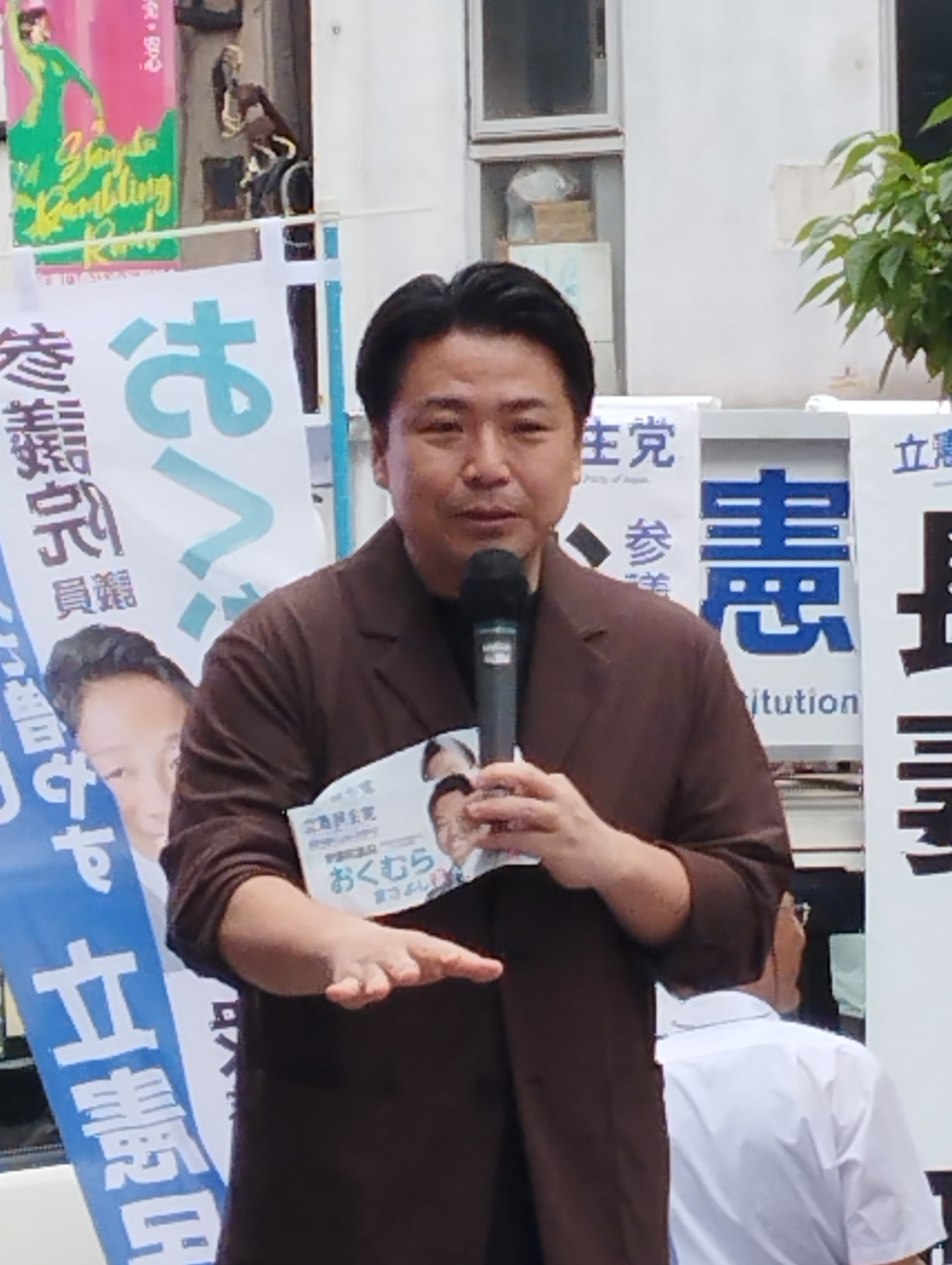
- Ito in 2025

Member of the House of Representatives
- In office 23 October 2017 – 23 January 2026
- Preceded by: Multi-member district
- Succeeded by: Shinichirō Kawamatsu
- Constituency: Tokyo PR (2017–2024); Tokyo 23rd (2024–2026)

Personal details
- Born: 5 August 1979 (age 46) Machida, Tokyo, Japan
- Party: CRA (since 2026)
- Other political affiliations: JRP (2012–2014); JIP 2014 (2014–2016); JIP 2016 (2016–2017); KnT (2017–2018); DPP (2018–2019); Independent (2019–2020); CDP (2020–2026)
- Parent: Kosuke Ito (father)
- Education: Chuo University

Shunsuke Ito (伊藤俊輔, Itō Shunsuke; born 5 August 1979) is a Japanese politician who served as a member of the House of Representatives from 2017 to 2026. He is the son of Kosuke Ito.
