= Junko Shigemitsu =

Japanese-American physicist

Junko Shigemitsu (born 1949) is a Japanese-American physicist known for her use of lattice gauge theory and lattice QCD to calculate predicted values for decay constants and other physical quantities. She is a professor emerita of physics at Ohio State University.

== Education and career ==
Shigemitsu graduated from Sophia University in 1973, and completed her Ph.D. at Cornell University in 1978, under the supervision of John Kogut. After postdoctoral research at the Institute for Advanced Study and Brown University, she joined the Ohio State University faculty as an assistant professor in 1982. She was promoted to associate professor in 1987, and full professor in 1992.

== Recognition ==
In 2000, Shigemitsu was named a Fellow of the American Physical Society (APS), after a nomination from the APS Division of Particles and Fields, "for her contributions to determining properties of the Standard Model using the methods of Lattice Gauge Theory". Ohio State University named her a distinguished scholar in 2011, and in 2014 Fermilab named her a Ben Lee Fellow.
