= Kosuke Ito (politician) =

Japanese politician

- 伊藤 公介
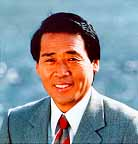

Director-General of the National Land Agency
- In office 7 November 1996 – 11 September 1997
- Prime Minister: Ryutaro Hashimoto
- Preceded by: Kazumi Suzuki
- Succeeded by: Hisaoki Kamei

Member of the House of Representatives
- In office 18 February 1990 – 21 July 2009
- Preceded by: Teruhisa Ishiwatari
- Succeeded by: Mari Kushibuchi
- Constituency: Tokyo 11th (1990–1996); Tokyo 23rd (1996–2009)
- In office 22 June 1980 – 2 June 1986
- Preceded by: Yukihisa Haseo
- Succeeded by: Teruhisa Ishiwatari
- Constituency: Tokyo 11th
- In office 5 December 1976 – 7 September 1979
- Preceded by: Constituency established
- Succeeded by: Emi Iwasa
- Constituency: Tokyo 11th

Personal details
- Born: 23 October 1941 (age 84) Takatō, Nagano, Japan
- Party: LDP (1986–2012)
- Other political affiliations: Independent (1972–1976); NLC (1976–1986); JRP (2012–2014)
- Children: Shunsuke Ito
- Education: Hosei University; Ohio State University

Kosuke Ito (伊藤 公介, Itō Kōsuke; born 23 October 1941) is a retired Japanese politician of the Liberal Democratic Party (LDP), a member of the House of Representatives in the Diet (national legislature). A native of Takatō, Nagano and graduate of Hosei University, he studied abroad in Berlin and then at Ohio State University. He was elected to the House of Representatives for the first time in 1976 as an independent and later joined the New Liberal Club, which later merged with the LDP.

House of Representatives (Japan)
Preceded by Kiyoshi Ozawa	Chair, Lower House Committee on Judicial Affairs; 1991	Succeeded by Takujiro Hamada
Preceded by Hideo Usui	Chair, Lower House Committee on Education; 1991–1993	Succeeded by Shōichi Watanabe
Preceded by Tarō Asō	Chair, Lower House Committee on Foreign Affairs; 1993	Succeeded by Naoto Kan
Preceded by Tsutomu Kawara	Chair, Lower House Committee on Fundamental National Policies; 2004	Succeeded by Yuya Niwa
Political offices
Preceded by Kazumi Suzuki	Head of the National Land Agency; 1996–1997	Succeeded by Hisaoki Kamei
