= Kyouichi Tachikawa =

Japanese historian

Kyouichi Tachikawa (立川 京一, Tachikawa Kyōichi; born 1966) is a Japanese historian specializing in international politics military history, specifically French Indochina. He was born in the Tokyo. He is a graduate of the Sophia University foreign language department. As of 1999, he lectures part-time at Sophia University and at Caritas Junior College. Currently he is working as a researcher for the Japanese Ministry of Defense where he does research on military history.

== Works ==
- The Second World War and French Indochina 第二次世界大戦とフランス領インドシナ——「日仏協力」の研究』（彩流社, 2000年）
- （石津朋之・道下徳成・塚本勝也）エア・パワー——その理論と実践（シリーズ軍事力の本質1）』（芙蓉書房, 2005年）(co-editor)
- マイケル・シャラー （五味俊樹・原口幸司・山崎由紀）『アジアにおける冷戦の起源——アメリカの対日占領』（木鐸社, 1996年）(co-translator)
- デイヴィッド・J・バーカソン （池内光久）『カナダの旗の下で——第二次世界大戦におけるカナダ軍の戦い』（彩流社, 2003年）(co-translator)
