= Rokko Junior and Senior High School =

Coordinates: 34.7281°N 135.2269°E

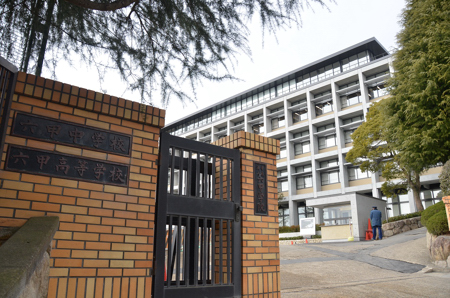
- Kobe City, Hyōgo Prefecture; Japan

Information
- Type: Private secondary school
- Religious affiliation: Catholicism
- Denomination: Jesuits
- Established: 1937; 89 years ago
- Gender: Boys
- Enrollment: 1,100
- Website: www.rokkogakuin.ed.jp/public_html/eng/index.html

Rokko Junior and Senior High School is a private Catholic secondary school for boys located in Kobe City, Hyōgo Prefecture, Japan. Founded by the Jesuits in 1937, it was the first Jesuit secondary school in Japan. The school offers an integrated middle and high school education for boys and does not recruit at the high school level.

== Academics and activities ==
Total enrollment is approximately 1,100 students.

There is no examination for admission to high school except to fill vacancies.

== See also ==
- Education in Kobe
- List of Jesuit schools
