= Ignatian Pedagogical Paradigm =

The Ignatian pedagogical paradigm is a way of learning and a method of teaching taken from the Spiritual Exercises of Ignatius of Loyola. It is based in St. Ignatius Loyola's Spiritual Exercises, and takes a holistic view of the world.

The three main elements are Experience, Reflection, and Action. A pre-learning element, Context, and a post-learning element, Evaluation, are also necessary for the method's success, bringing the total to five elements. Ignatian pedagogy uses this dynamic five-step method along with an Ignatian vision of the human and the world to "accompany the learner in their growth and development."

The Ignatian pedagogical paradigm is also used in spiritual retreats and learning experiences as an active means of developing and questioning one's own conscience, as well as in making sound and conscientious decisions.

== History of the Ignatian pedagogical paradigm ==
The Ignatian pedagogical paradigm (IPP) is over 450 years old. In 1599, the first official version of the method was published in Ratio Studiorum (Latin for "plan of studies")(Ratio), although the method was not called the "Ignatian pedagogical paradigm" in Ratio. Still, the basic method was present. In the ensuing centuries, Jesuit institutions of learning around the world have adopted the methods laid out in Ratio and refined by others through the years.

== The Ignatian pedagogical paradigm ==
=== Context ===
The context in which the learner finds himself or herself is important. This is partly the real circumstances of a student's life which include family, peers, social situations, the educational institution, politics, economics, cultural climate, the church situation, media, music and so on.

The socio-economic, political and cultural contexts must not be forgotten, as these can seriously affect their growth as a person for others. Cultures of poverty usually negatively affect expectations about success; oppressive political regimes usually discourage open inquiry. These and many other factors may stifle the freedom encouraged by Ignatian pedagogy.

As mentioned above, the institutional environment of the learning center is part of the context.

Prior learning is part of the context. Points of view and insights acquired from earlier study or spontaneously acquired from their environment are part of the context. Their feelings and attitudes regarding the subject matter also form part of the real context for learning.

=== Experience ===
"The learning experience is expected to move beyond rote knowledge to the development of the more complex learning skills of understanding, application, analysis, synthesis, and evaluation. . . .We use the term experience to describe any activity in which in addition to a cognitive grasp of the matter being considered, some sensation of an affective nature is registered by the student. . . .In his pedagogy, Ignatius highlights the affective/evaluative stage of the learning process because he is conscious that in addition to letting one 'sense and taste,' i.e., deepen one's experience, affective feelings are motivational forces that move one's understanding to action and commitment."

Learners gather and recollect their own experiences in order to understand what they know already in terms of facts, feelings, values, insights and intuitions they bring to the current study.

=== Reflection ===
This is the fundamental key to the paradigm. This is how the student makes the learning experience their own and obtains the meaning of the learning experience for herself and for others.

Reflection means thoughtful reconsideration of subject matter, an experience, an idea, a purpose or a spontaneous reaction, that its significance may be more fully grasped. Reflection is how meaning becomes apparent in human experience. Memory, understanding, imagination and feelings are used to perceive meaning and value in the subject matter, and to discover connections with other forms of knowledge and activity, and to understand its implications in the further search for truth and liberty. Ignatian learning cannot stop at experience. It would lack the component of reflection where meaning and significance arise, and where integration of that meaning translates into competence, conscience and compassion. The student considers what the material means to him or her, and personally appropriates it.

=== Action ===
Action means the learner's internal state – that is: attitudes, priorities, commitments, habits, values, ideals, and growth – flowing out into actions for others. Ignatius Loyola sought not just to serve God but to excel in such service, to do even more than what is required. "Ignatius does not seek just any action or commitment. Rather, while respecting human freedom, he strives to encourage decision and commitment for the magis, the better service of God and our sisters and brothers.

Jesuit education is not meant to end in mere personal satisfaction. It is meant to move the learner to act.

The goal is not merely to educate the mind, but to change the person into a better, more caring human with a developed conscience.

=== Evaluation ===
Periodic evaluation of the learner's growth is essential. In the paradigm, it measures more than intellectual success, artistic talent, or athletic ability. Evaluation is to assess those things, but it is also to produce an awareness of the real needs yet unmet, as well as to understand the learner's own personal and moral growth.

== See also ==
- Ignatius of Loyola
- Society of Jesus
- Catholicism
