= Eiko Gakuen =

Private secondary school in Tamanawa, Kamakura, Kanagawa Prefecture, Japan

- Japanese: 栄光学園中学高等学校

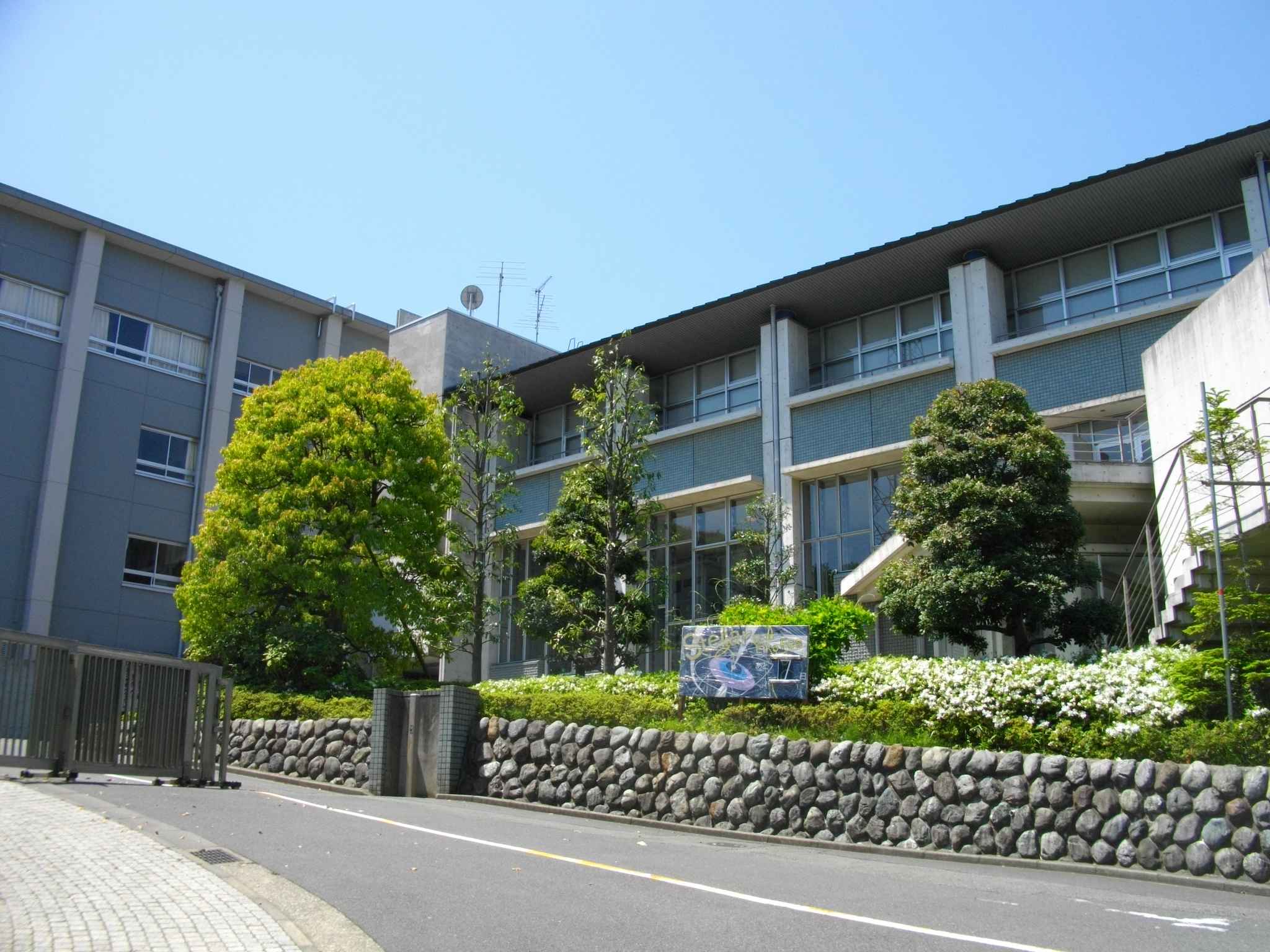

Location
- Oboe, Kamakura, Kanagawa Prefecture; Japan
- Coordinates: 35°21′25″N 139°31′13″E

Information
- Type: Private secondary school
- Motto: Latin: Ad maiorem Dei gloriam (For the greater glory of God)
- Religious affiliation: Catholicism
- Denomination: Jesuits
- Patron saint: Aloysius Gonzaga
- Established: 1947; 79 years ago
- Gender: Boys
- Enrollment: 1,080
- Affiliation: Sophia Academy Corporation
- Website: www.ekh.jp

Eiko Gakuen (Japanese: 栄光学園中学高等学校, romanized: Eiko Gakuen Chūgaku Kōtōgakkō) is a private Catholic junior and senior high school for boys, located in Tamanawa, Kamakura, in the Kanagawa Prefecture of Japan.

The school was founded in 1947 by the Society of Jesus. The school's patron saint is the Jesui Aloysius Gonzaga, and the motto is taken from that of the Jesuits: Latin: Ad maiorem Dei gloriam, translated as "for the greater glory of God."

== Education ==
There is heavy emphasis on learning and discipline. Ethics class is compulsory but religious and biblical studies are optional.

== See also ==
- List of schools in Japan
- List of Jesuit schools
