= Ryo Tagaya =

Japanese politician

- 多ケ谷 亮

Member of the House of Representatives
- In office 5 November 2021 – 23 January 2026
- Preceded by: Kimie Hatano
- Succeeded by: Joji Yamamoto
- Constituency: Southern Kanto PR

Personal details
- Born: 25 November 1968 (age 57) Shinjuku, Tokyo, Japan
- Party: CRA (since 2026)
- Other political affiliations: PLF (2012); TPJ (2012–2013); LP (2013–2016); DP (2016–2017); KnT (2017–2020); Reiwa (2020–2026)
- Children: 2
- Education: Kokugakuin University
- Occupation: Business manager • Politician

Ryo Tagaya (多ケ谷亮; born 25 November 1968) is a Japanese politician who served as a member of the House of Representatives, in Japan's National Diet, from 2021 to 2026. He represented the Southern Kanto proportional representation block.

Tagaya was previously a member of Reiwa Shinsengumi, a left-wing populist opposition party led by Tarō Yamamoto. The party is known for progressive stances, including strong criticism of Israel's actions in Gaza and pro-Palestinian positions. In early January 2026, Tagaya participated in a parliamentary delegation visit to Israel, where he met with Prime Minister Benjamin Netanyahu. This action drew significant backlash from within Reiwa Shinsengumi and its supporters, who viewed it as inconsistent with the party's anti-war line, especially amid the Israel-Gaza conflict. As a result, he left the party.

Following his departure, Tagaya joined the Centrist Reform Alliance. The alliance endorsed him as a candidate for Chiba's 11th district in the 2026 Japanese general election.
