= Takashi Takai =

Japanese politician (born 1969)

- 高井 崇志
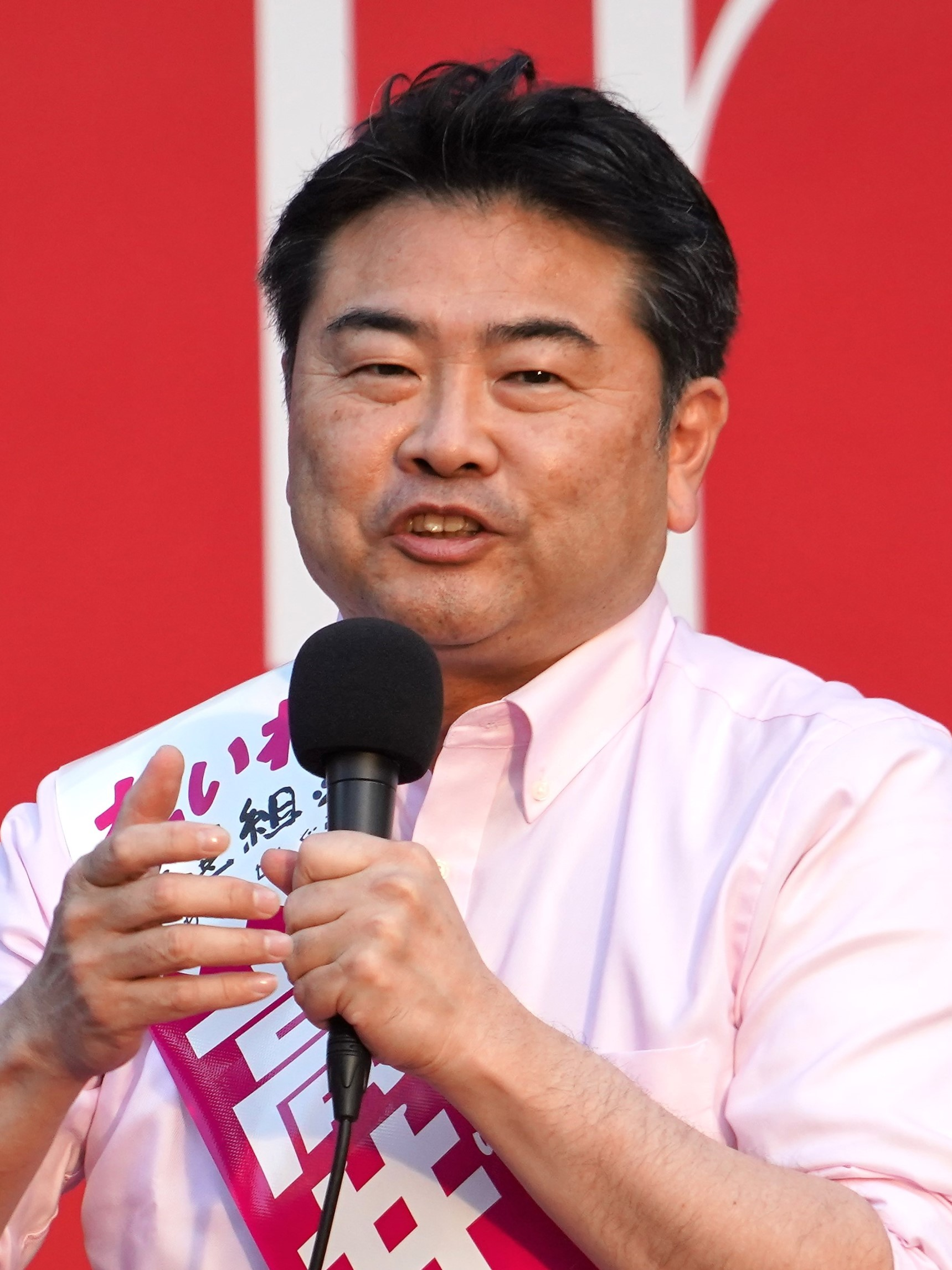
- Takai in 2022, in front of Shibuya Station

Secretary-General of Reiwa Shinsengumi
- In office 6 December 2021 – 16 February 2026
- Leader: Taro Yamamoto
- Preceded by: Position established
- Succeeded by: Joji Yamamoto

Member of the House of Representatives
- In office 28 October 2024 – 23 January 2026
- Preceded by: Hideaki Takahashi
- Succeeded by: Multi-member district
- Constituency: Northern Kanto PR
- In office 14 December 2014 – 31 October 2021
- Preceded by: Masayoshi Yoshino
- Succeeded by: Seiki Soramoto
- Constituency: Chūgoku PR
- In office 31 August 2009 – 16 December 2012
- Preceded by: Katsunobu Katō
- Succeeded by: Toshiko Abe
- Constituency: Chūgoku PR

Personal details
- Born: 26 September 1969 (age 57) Hakodate, Hokkaido, Japan
- Party: Reiwa Shinsengumi (since 2021)
- Other political affiliations: DPJ (2005–2013); Independent (2013–2014); JIP (2014–2016); DP (2016–2017); CDP (2017–2020); Independent (Note: Caucused with the DPP) (2020–2021)
- Education: Faculty of Economics, University of Tokyo
- Website: takaitakashi.com

Takashi Takai (高井 崇志, Takai Takashi; born 26 September 1969) is a Japanese politician and former bureaucrat who currently serves as a member of the House of Representatives for the Kita-Kantō PR block. He formerly served on two other occasions in the House of Representatives. He formerly served as secretary-general of Reiwa Shinsengumi, and has twice previously been elected to the House of Representatives. He is currently a deputy secretary-general of Reiwa Shinsengumi. Having previously been a member of the CDP, he was expelled in 2020 after having been found to have broken COVID-19 rules by visiting a sex parlor.

== Early life ==
Takai was born in Hakodate, Hokkaido Prefecture. He stated on Sun Television that he "grew up frugally... we were not a wealthy family. But I grew up happy with my younger brother." His father moved repeatedly due to transferring jobs, and he moved elementary school four times. Influenced by reading "Summer of Bureaucrats" by Saburo Shiroyama, he aspired to enter civil service after school.

After finishing primary school, he entered the Faculty of Economics at the University of Tokyo. His thesis was titled "NTT Separation and Division". After writing it, he became interested primarily in telecommunications administration. He soon after passed the class 1 National Civil Service Examination and entered the Ministry of Posts and Telecommunications. He was assigned to the Telecommunications Authority.

== Politics ==
After briefly opting to study abroad at University of Münster in Germany and then serving as Deputy Chief of Nagaoka Post Office in Niigata, he returned to work in the MPT for several more years in and around Japan. After being relocated to Okayama, he became the secretary to Satsuki Eda, who represented Okayama for nearly twenty years in the House of Councillors.

He was selected by the Democratic Party to contest Okayama against Toranosuke Katayama in the 2007 House of Councilors election in 2005, but declined. Yumiko Himei went on to win against Katayama. He instead ran for mayor of Okayama, but lost. He left the Democratic Party briefly after the election.

When the Democratic Party called for candidates before the 2009 election, Takai expressed interest and was selected to run in Okayama's first district. He came close to defeating long-time incumbent Ichiro Aisawa, but was defeated. Having been placed on the proportional block as a candidate, he was nevertheless elected to the Diet.

On 26 August 2011, Prime Minister Naoto Kan announced his resignation from the prime ministership and as head of the Democratic Party. He was one of Sumio Mabuchi's sponsors, who finished last in the 2011 Democratic Party leadership election.

In the landslide of 2012, he ran against in Okayama's 1st. He failed to win again, however, and was defeated by over thirty points. Due to the wide margin of defeat, he was not revived on the proportional block, leaving him without a seat.

In May 2013, he left the Democratic Party. In June 2013, he was sponsored by the Democratic Party, SDP, and Green Wind to run as an independent in Okayama in an effort to defend the seat he declined in 2005. He lost by over thirty points, reflecting the national attitude that was heavily in favor of the LDP. He failed again later that year to run for mayor of Okayama.

He joined the Japan Innovation Party following the merger of Kenji Eda's Unity Party into the party. He ran with the party in Okayama's 1st district again. He lost by a slightly slimmer margin of twenty points, and was revived proportionally, having been ranked first on the proportional list for the party. When the JIP merged with the Democratic Party of Japan to form the 2016 variant of the Democratic Party, he joined.

When the Democratic Party effectively merged with Kibō no Tō for the 2017 election, Takai initially indicated his want to secure endorsement of the new party. However, on 2 October, Yukio Edano launched the Constitutional Democratic Party. Takai determined that Yuriko Koike's acceptance of security legislation and overall conservative tone did not match his ideology, and he later called Edano to announce he would join the CDP. A day later, it was announced that Tō would field Hiromi Hachiya, an LDP prefectural assembly member, in Okayama's 1st. Takai announced later that day that he would be the CDP candidate for the district. Although he lost to Aizawa again, it was by eighteen percent, the closest margin since 2009. He also managed to beat Hachiya out for second by a wide margin, and ultimately was revived on the proportional block yet again, securing another term in the Diet.

In April 2020, after Japan had declared a national emergency due to the COVID-19 pandemic, it was reported that Takai had visited sex parlors in Tokyo. He submitted his resignation on the 14th, but the CDP did not accept it, and instead expelled him from the party.

=== Post-CDP and Reiwa ===
On 27 October, he joined the DPP caucus in the House of Representatives.

It was announced shortly before the 2021 general election that Takai would run in Shiga's 3rd district, as part of just a few Reiwa Shinsengumi SMD candidates thanks to the opposition coordination heralded by Yukio Edano. He also switched to Reiwa in the Diet. He received just under 10% of the vote, and his election deposit was forfeited. He did not get revived proportionally.

He became Secretary-General of Reiwa Shinsengumi in December 2021.

In April 2022, it was announced Takai would be fielded in the national proportional block ahead of the 2022 Japanese House of Councillors election. In the election in June, he was not elected, having been eighth out of the nine candidates Reiwa Shinsengumi placed on the nationwide block. He did not win one of the two seats that went to the party.

On 7 October 2024, it was announced that he would be fielded for the 2024 election in Saitama's 13th district. He managed to win 12.34% of the vote on election day, placing ahead of the Nippon Ishin no Kai candidate by a percent and having his deposit returned. He was also placed on the top of the list in the North Kanto PR block. As Reiwa won 7.2% of the vote and placed above Nippon Ishin no Kai by .5 proportionally, they were entitled to one seat on the block which was filled by Takai. Reiwa managed to triple their seat count as a whole.

As Reiwa holds a batch of deciding votes in the post-2024 election Diet, Takai has become an important figure, particularly with Yamamoto currently in the House of Councilors. On political reform, he stated that he felt both the opposition submitted and LDP submitted bill on reform were "insufficient". Reiwa currently holds the deciding vote for the political reform battles.

Takai lost his seat in the February 2026 general election, in which Reiwa was reduced to only one seat in the House of Representatives. Takai was subsequently demoted to deputy secretary general.
