= Left-wing populism =

Political ideology

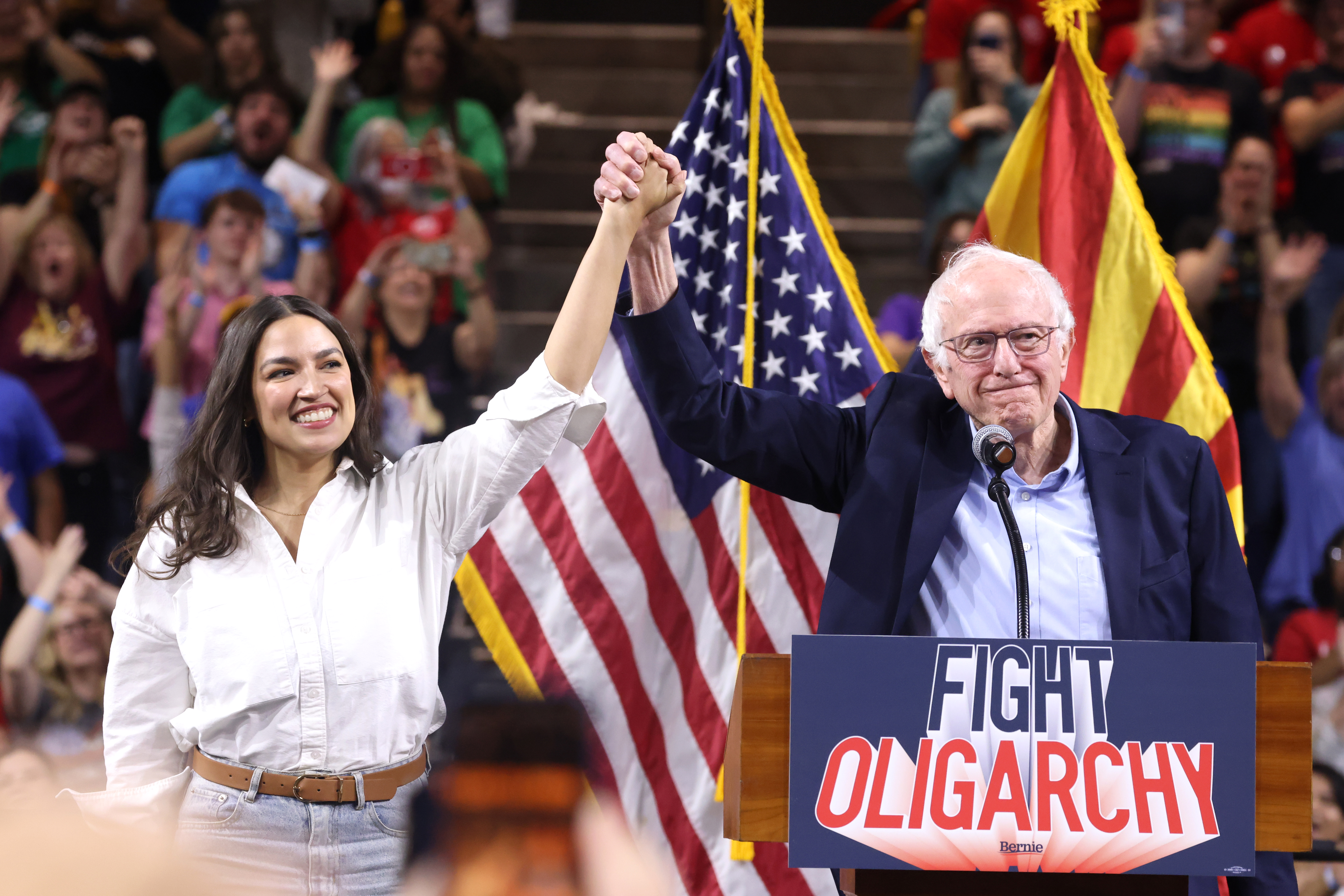
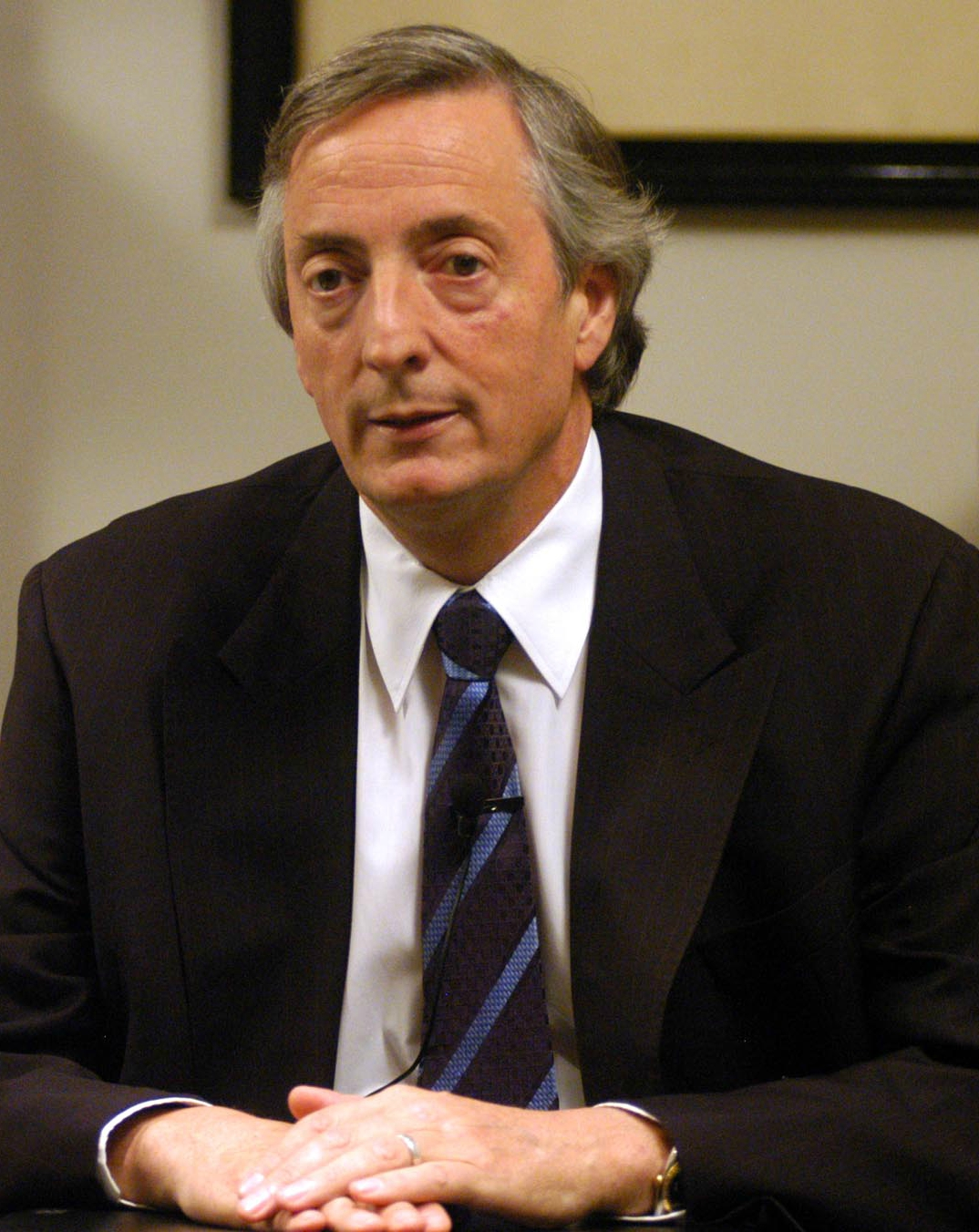
From left to right, top to bottom:
- US Congresswoman Alexandria Ocasio-Cortez (left) and Senator Bernie Sanders (right)
- Former Argentine President Néstor Kirchner
- Former Mexican President Andrés Manuel López Obrador
- French Politician Jean-Luc Mélenchon

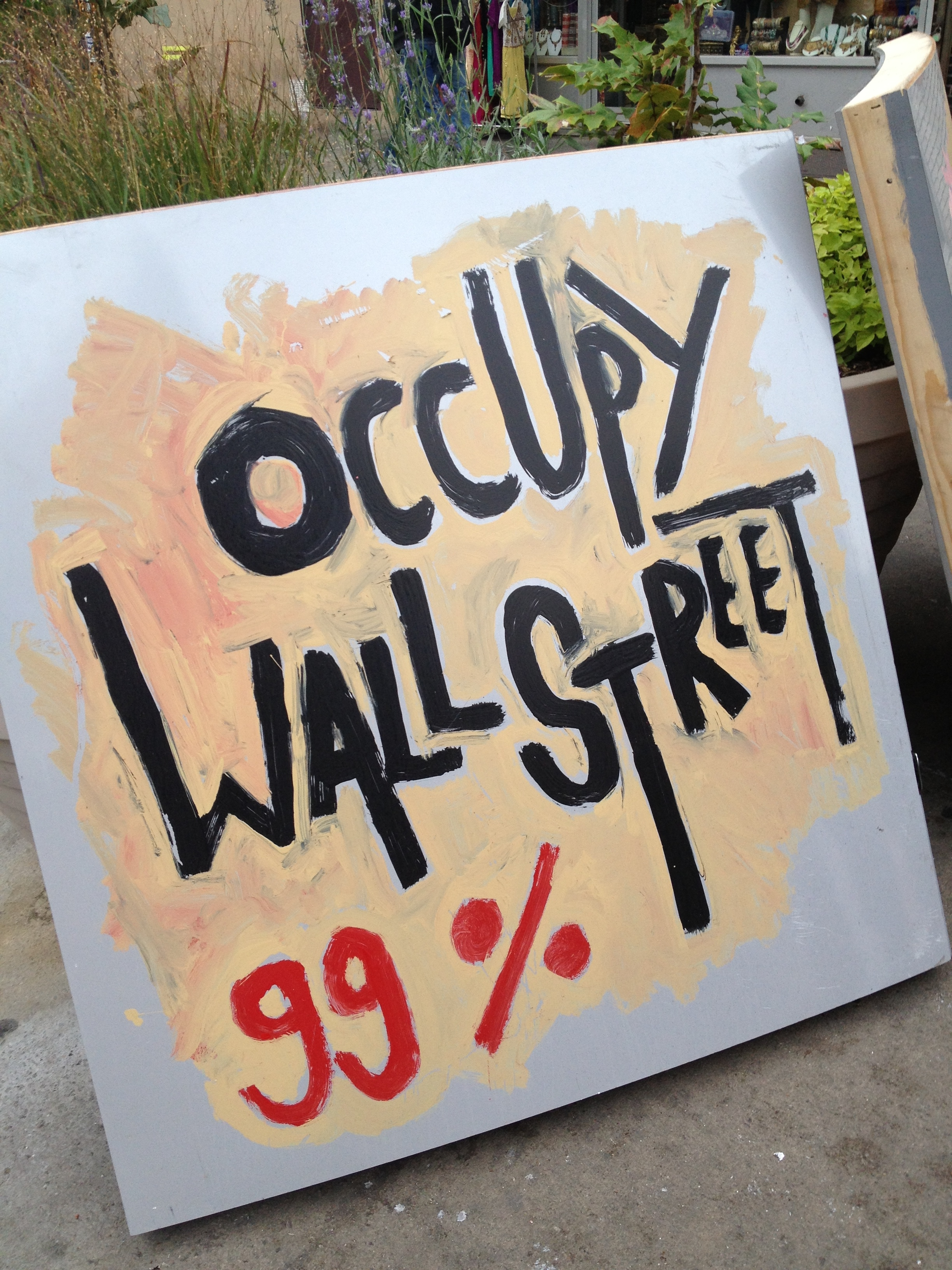
An Occupy Wall Street sign with the 99% slogan, a left-wing populist movement

Left-wing populism (Note: Also known as economic populism, leftist populism, and social populism.) is a political ideology that combines left-wing politics with populist rhetoric and themes. Its rhetoric often includes elements of anti-elitism, opposition to the Establishment, and speaking for the masses against economic monopolies. Recurring themes for left-wing populists include economic democracy, social justice, and skepticism of globalization.

Criticism of capitalism and globalization is linked to unpopular United States military operations, especially those in the Middle East. The populist left seeks to not exclude others horizontally, relying on egalitarian ideals. Some scholars also speak of nationalist left-wing populist movements, a feature exhibited by the Sandinista Revolution in Nicaragua or the Bolivarian Revolution in Venezuela. Unlike right-wing populists, left-wing populist parties tend to support minority rights, as well as an idea of nationality that is not delimited by cultural or ethnic particularism. Bernie Sanders and Alexandria Ocasio-Cortez, self-described democratic socialists, are examples of modern left-wing populist politicians in the United States. With the rise of Syriza and Podemos during the European debt crisis, there has been increased debate on new left-wing populism in Europe.

Traditionally, left-wing populism has been associated with the socialist movement; since the 2010s, there has been a movement close to left-wing populism in the left-liberal camp, some of which are considered social democratic positions. In the 2020s, left-liberal economic populism appealing to the working class has been prominent in some countries, such as with Lee Jae-myung of South Korea.

== By country ==
=== Africa ===
==== Nigeria ====
Peter Obi, a businessman and outsider politician running with the Labour Party in the 2023 Nigerian presidential election, was seen as a populist politician, gaining the support of much of Nigeria's youth. Before running for President, Obi took part in the End SARS movement, which sought to disband Nigeria's Special Anti-Robbery Squad, or SARS due to its connection to the criminal underworld and its excessive use of force. SARS was disbanded in 2020. Obi's presidential campaign in 2022 and 2023 constantly ran on issues such as economic development, fighting corruption, moving beyond ethnic politics, which have dominated Nigeria going back to its founding, and promoting criminal justice reform. Obi sought to challenge the traditional two-party system, led by the centrist and Buharist All Progressives Congress on one side, and the center-right, nationalist, and conservative-liberal Peoples Democratic Party.

==== South Africa ====
Julius Malema, the former leader of the African National Congress Youth League, broke away from the center-left African National Congress to form the Economic Freedom Fighters (EFF). The EFF are notable for their extreme black nationalism, which has been accused by critics of including anti-Asian racism, anti-White racism, and antisemitism. This also includes radical economic reforms inspired by Marxism-Leninism, including land reform without compensation. The EFF is also extremely anti-West, to the point of actively trying to support Russia's invasion and occupation in Ukraine and has denied the well documented war crimes committed by Russia, as well as the Belt and road initiative within Africa itself. However, the EFF is not socially conservative. In fact, voters for the EFF are the mostly likely of all voters in South Africa to support same-sex marriage, which has been legal since 2006.

In the run-up to the 2024 South African general election, former president Jacob Zuma has formed his own political party, uMkhonto we Sizwe. Named after the former paramilitary wing of the ANC of the same name, Zuma has been trying to position himself as supporting a more legitimate version of the ANC. MK, as Zuma's party is also known, calls for deporting illegal immigrants to South Africa, land reform without compensation, and opposition to same-sex marriage, the latter making it in opposition to the ANC on that one particular issue.

==== Zimbabwe ====
Former prime minister Robert Mugabe and his ZANU–PF party are seen as populist by many observers. Mugabe's ideology combined African nationalism with socialist economics and a broad-based appeal to the people. The most notably policies of ZANU–PF are their land reforms.

=== Americas ===
==== Argentina ====
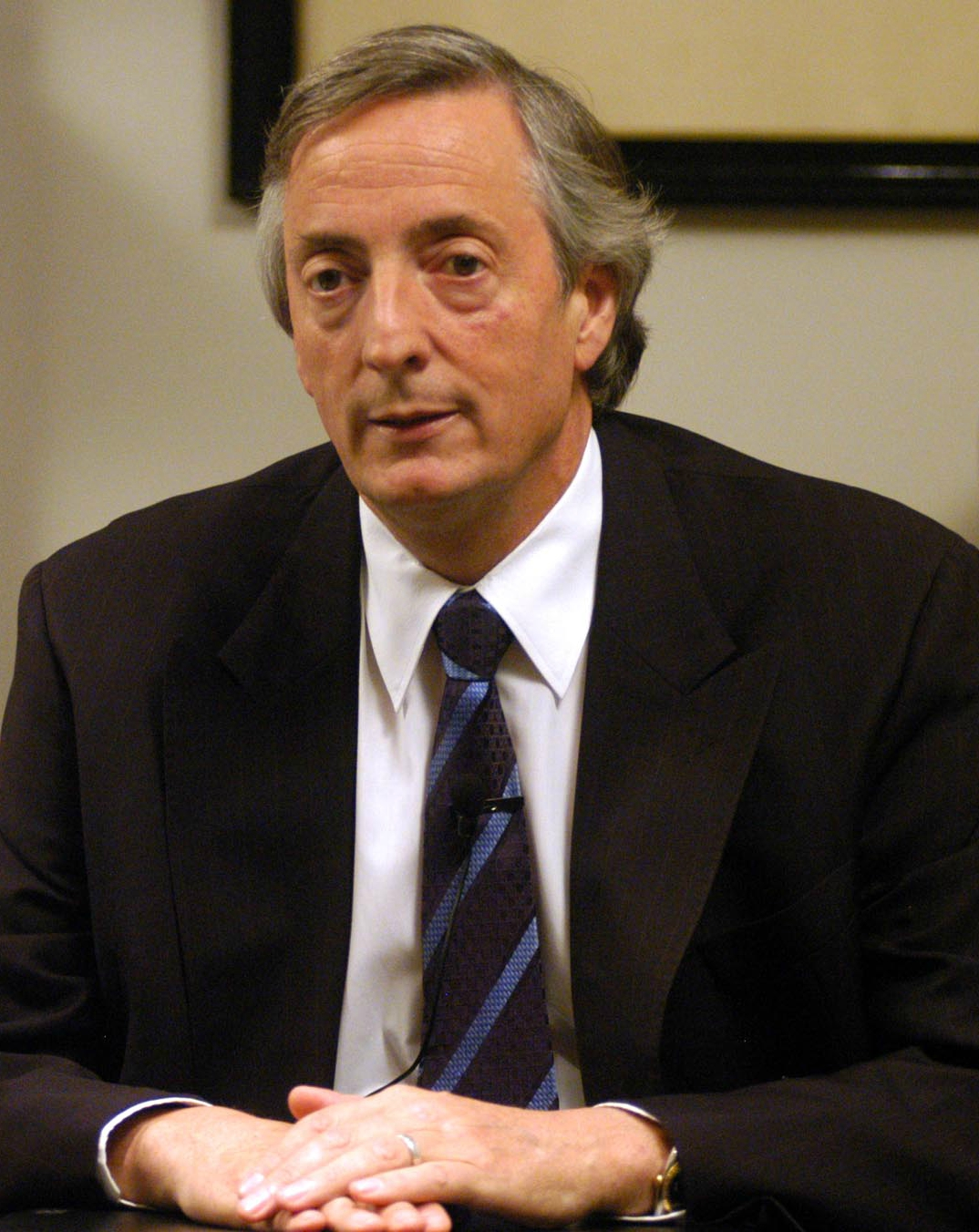
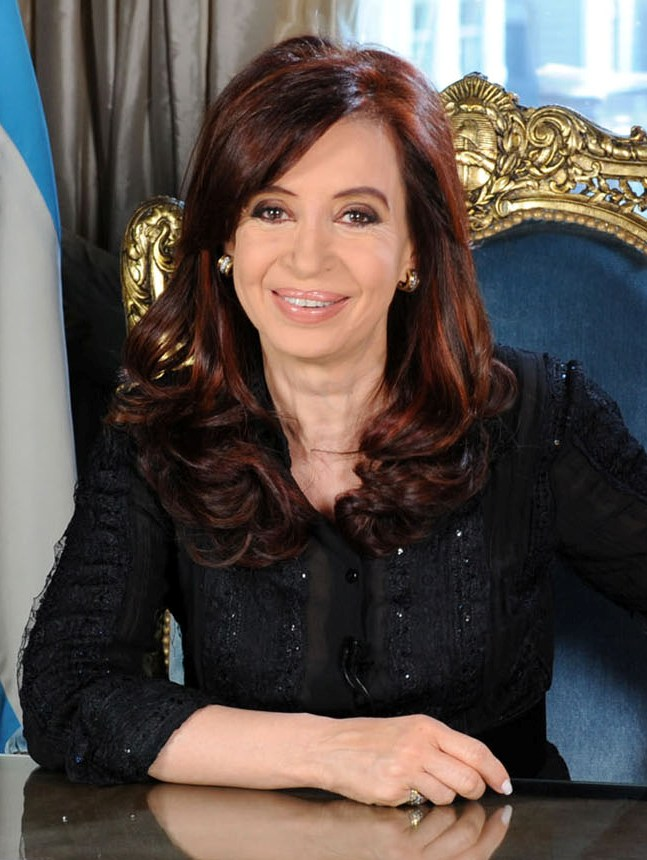
Néstor Kirchner (left) and Cristina Fernández de Kirchner (right) served as Presidents of Argentina from 2003–2007 and 2007–2015.

Cristina Fernández de Kirchner (the President of Argentina from 2007 to 2015) and her husband Néstor Kirchner were said to practice Kirchnerism, a variant of Peronism that was often mentioned alongside other Pink tide governments in Latin America. During Cristina Fernández de Kirchner's time in office, she spoke against certain free trade agreements, such as the proposed Free Trade Area of the Americas. Her administration was characterized by tax increases, especially on agricultural exports during the late 2000s commodities boom, Argentina's main export, in order to fund social programs such as the PROGRESAR university scholarships, the universal allocation per child subsidy (commonly referred to as AUH in Argentina, Asignación Universal por Hijo), a means-tested benefit to families with children who qualified for the subsidy, and progressive social reforms such as the recognition of same-sex marriage.

==== Bolivia ====
The leadership of Siles Zuazo practised left-wing populism as well as that of former socialist President Evo Morales.

==== Brazil ====
Lulism is a pragmatic centre-left ideology to the extent that it is called "socialist neoliberalism", but it appeals to a progressive, common-class image and also has populist elements in terms of popular mobilization.

==== Canada ====
The New Democratic Party (NDP) is considered to be left-wing populist, especially regarding anti-elitism and minority rights. Party leader Avi Lewis of the Lewis Family holds left populist views.

==== Ecuador ====
Rafael Correa, the former President of Ecuador, has stressed the importance of a "populist discourse" and has integrated technocrats to work within this context for the common Ecuadorians. Correa has blamed foreign non-governmental organizations for exploiting the indigenous people in the conflict between the indigenous peoples and the government.

==== Mexico ====
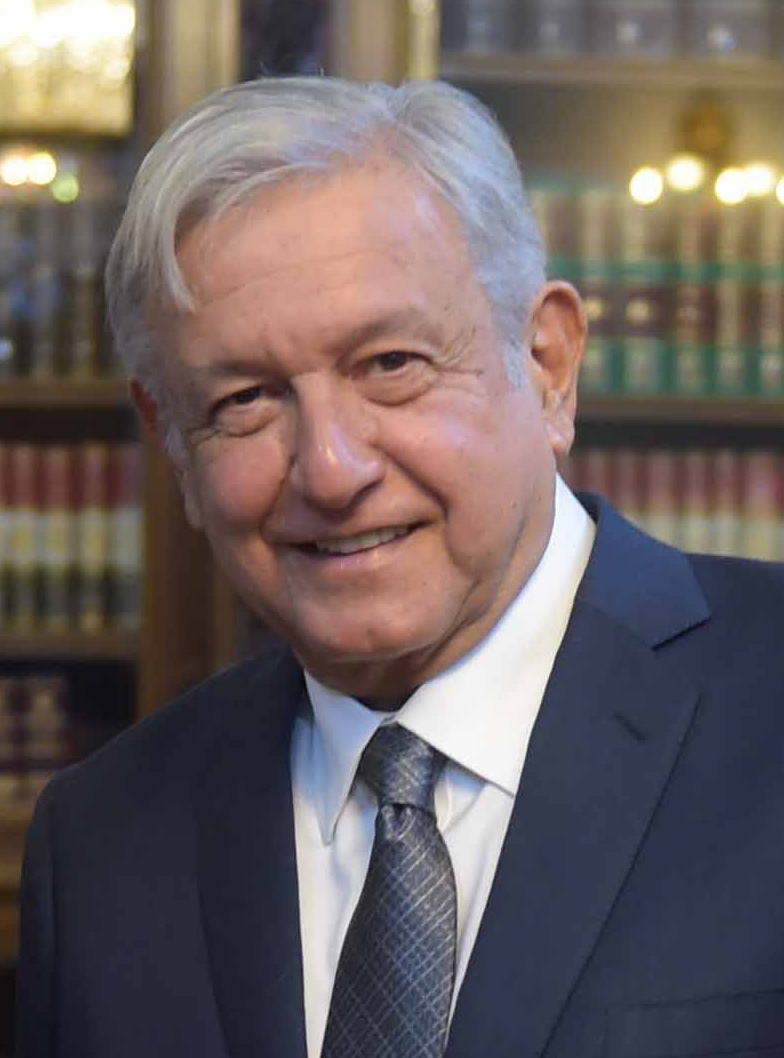
Andrés Manuel López Obrador in 2018

Former President of Mexico, Andrés Manuel López Obrador (or AMLO for short), and his party, the Morena, are considered left-wing populist in nature. AMLO has been a politician in Mexico for over three decades. He has been described as many different things, including centre-left, progressive, a left-wing populist, social democratic, and economically nationalist.

==== United States ====
During the 1890s and 1900s, the People's Party (United States), commonly known as the Populists, was a political party that grew out of a broad, economically left-wing movement, agrarian in nature but formed out of a "coalition of farmers, laborers, and middle-class activists" during a period of intensive labor unrest and economic transformation in the United States. Concerned that the two major American political parties were too beholden to corporate interests and hence inimical to reform, this coalition gave rise to the People's Party by 1892. They cast themselves in opposition to big business, particularly the banks and gold standard, and the political establishment controlled by them. It advocated for government intervention in the economy, such as the government ownership of railroads.

Huey Long, the Great Depression-era Governor-turned-Senator of Louisiana, was one of the first modern American left-wing populists in the United States. He advocated for wealth redistribution under his Share Our Wealth plan, which had its roots in the classical left-wing populist movement of Jacksonian democracy, which is related to the radical movement.

Bernie Sanders and Alexandria Ocasio-Cortez, self-described democratic socialists, are examples of modern left-wing populist politicians. Sanders and Ocasio-Cortez's populist message tend to place the people in opposition to big business and the very wealthy. Ocasio-Cortez's Democratic primary victory over the establishment Democratic Caucus Chair Joe Crowley, a 10-term incumbent, was widely seen as the biggest upset victory in the 2018 midterm election primaries. The Nation magazine described Ocasio-Cortez as a "new rock star" who was "storming the country on behalf of insurgent populists". Elizabeth Warren is also mentioned as a representative left-wing or liberal populist, and Warren is sometimes evaluated as a social democrat. Joe Biden is usually classified as a political moderate, but his economic policies occasionally have attracted the populist moniker. Sherrod Brown has also been cited as a "left-wing progressive" and populist.

==== Venezuela ====
The presidency of Hugo Chávez resembled a combination of folk wisdom and charismatic leadership with doctrinaire socialism. Chávez's anti-establishment stance helped him win the 1998 Venezuelan presidential election. His closeness to Cuba caused problems for Venezuela's relationship with the US. The relationship further soured due to the failed 2002 coup attempt, for which Chávez blamed the US and the CIA. His foreign policy opposed the US and, in a speech before the United Nations General Assembly, he said that George W. Bush was "the devil himself" and that he had left a "smell of sulphur" in the Assembly chamber. He was admired by progressives and popular among his own people, especially the poor. George W. Bush openly supported the Venezuelan opposition, but Barack Obama scaled back the support after his election.

=== Asia ===
==== Israel ====
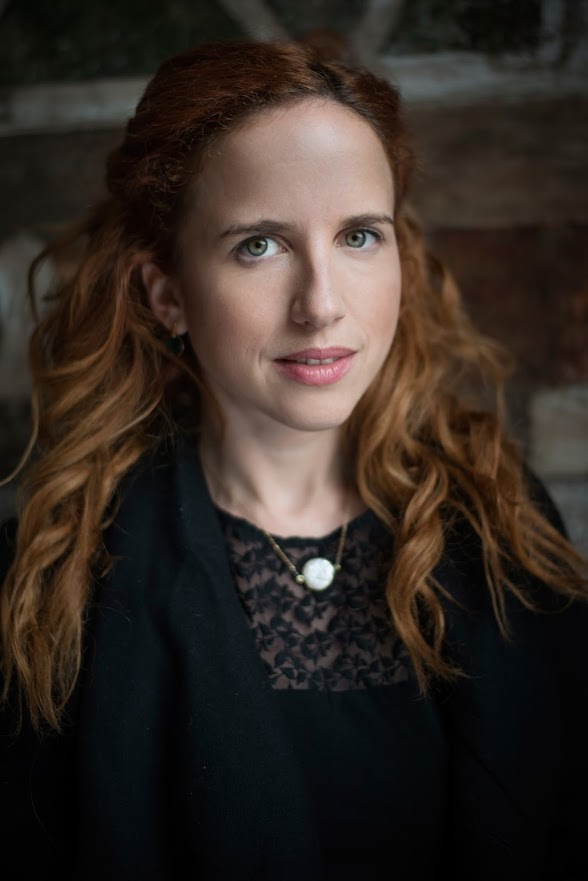
Stav Shaffir in 2015. She was an activist involved in Israel's social justice movement and broadly seen as a left-wing progressive firebrand.

Stav Shaffir is a politician who was traditionally associetated with the more left-wing and populistic elements of Israeli politics, especially issues of environmentalism, social justice, and a strongly pro-peace stance to the Israeli-Palestinian conflict. She initially got her start in Israeli politics as one of the three leaders, alongside Daphni Leef and Itzik Shmuli, of the 2011 social justice protests. Shaffir became particularly well known for her debate with Likud MK Miri Regev over housing prices on the Israeli television program Erev Hadash. She would go on to discuss the protest movement on tours to the United States, alongside pro-peace Labor Zionist Amos Oz, serving as a keynote speaker for Jewish-American organizations like JStreet.

In 2012, Shaffir joined the Israeli Labor Party. She became a member of the Israeli Knesset after the 2013 Israeli legislative election. She became famous for being the MK with the lowest net worth, owning nothing more than her apartment and a car. She worked with the socially liberal, secular, and liberal Zionist party Hatnua, eventually forming the Zionist Union, which would also run in the 2015 Israeli legislative election. By that time, however, she had left and become the leader of the Green Movement, later renamed to the Green Party in 2019. For the September 2019 Israeli legislative election, Shaffir organized various parties together to form the Democratic Union coalition. However, after the 2020 Israeli legislative election, Shaffir lost her seat. During her tenure as MK from 2013 to 2020, Shaffir worked on issues from social justice to defunding West Bank settlements, and from government transparency efforts to LGBT rights.

Yesh Atid is a radical centrist or liberal party. In Israeli politics, "liberal" is not particularly a concept that is distinguished by left or right, but Yesh Atid is evaluated that it has a left-wing populist element in part. They criticize elitism that causes political corruption and demand a position on material redistribution. However, Yesh Atid has an element of economic liberalism simultaneously.

Former Aluf in the IDF Yair Golan has promoted views supporting Leftist Zionism, a two-state solution with Israel keeping some of the settlement blocs, but opposition to total annexation of the West Bank, full separation of synagogue and state as well as ending the marriage monopoly by the Chief Rabbinate, opposing corruption, supporting the 2023 judicial reform protests, supporting LGBTQ+ rights, and creating a fairer economy for all Israelis.

==== Japan ====
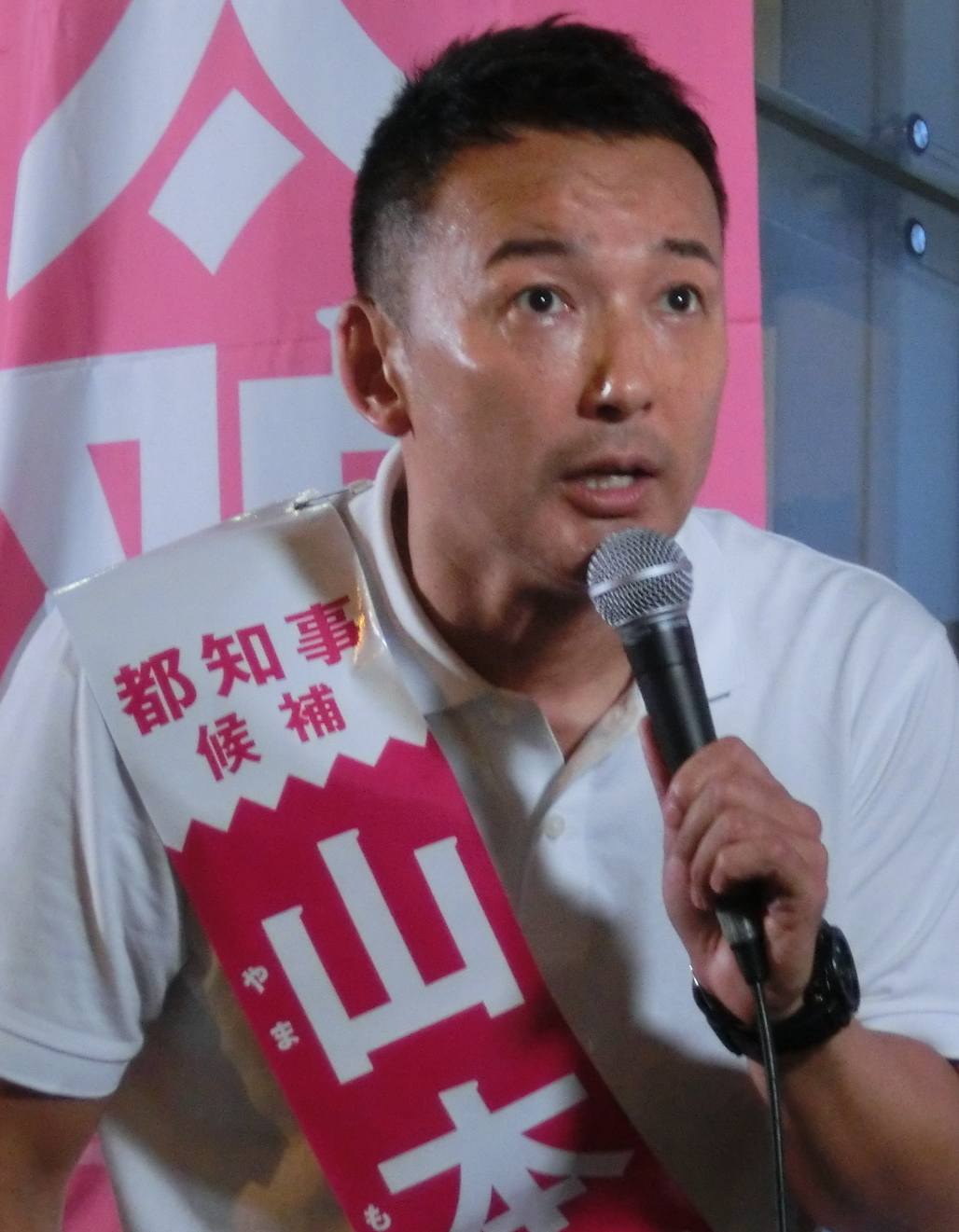
Tarō Yamamoto in 2020. He is mentioned as a (left-wing) liberal-populist.

Reiwa Shinsengumi, led by Joji Yamamoto and founded by Taro Yamamoto, is a representative Japanese left-wing populist movement. While the party uses anti-establishment rhetoric, they are sometimes called "liberal populist". According to experts, Taro Yamamoto used a simple message to spotlight single individuals left behind, including people struggling with poverty or non-permanent employment, who used to devote themselves to radical conservatism.

Reiwa Shinsengumi is also called a "progressive populist", because they are not rooted in the traditional Japanese socialist or Labor movement, but are culturally and economically progressive, representing marginalized young people and minorities.

==== South Korea ====
South Korea's leftist political party, the Progressive Party, advocates direct democracy, anti-neoliberalism and anti-imperialism. They support a national liberalist foreign policy hostile to Japan.

Lee Jae-myung, one of DPK's major politicians, has been mentioned as a "populist" in some media outlets. Lee Jae-myung pledged to implement the world's first universal basic income system if elected in the 2022 South Korean presidential election but said he would not pay for it if the people opposed it. South Korea's right-wing politician Hong Joon-pyo saw Lee Jae-myung in September 2021 and accused him of being "Chávez of Gyeonggi Province". However, there is controversy in South Korea as to whether Lee Jae-myung can be viewed as a "left-wing populist" in the context of the United States or Europe. He once said he was "conservative" and suggested policies far from general left-wing populism in the United States and Europe, partially insisting on economic liberal policies such as deregulating companies on some issues. In addition, he showed a somewhat conservative tendency on some social agendas. In addition, Kim Hyun-jong, the head of the International Trade Special Division at the Lee Jae-myung Camp, met with Henry Kissinger, and Henry Kissinger gave Lee Jae-myung a handwritten autograph called "Good wishes". In addition, Lee Jae-myung's political orientation was somewhat ambiguous, so conservative journalist Dong-A Ilbo denied that he was a left-wing politician, while South Korea's far-left organization Workers' Solidarity evaluated him as a social democratic. (However, another South Korean left-wing undongkwon group denied that Lee Jae-myung is not a social democratic.) Lee is also a staunch supporter of free trade, unlike ordinary economic populists.

=== Europe ===
==== France ====
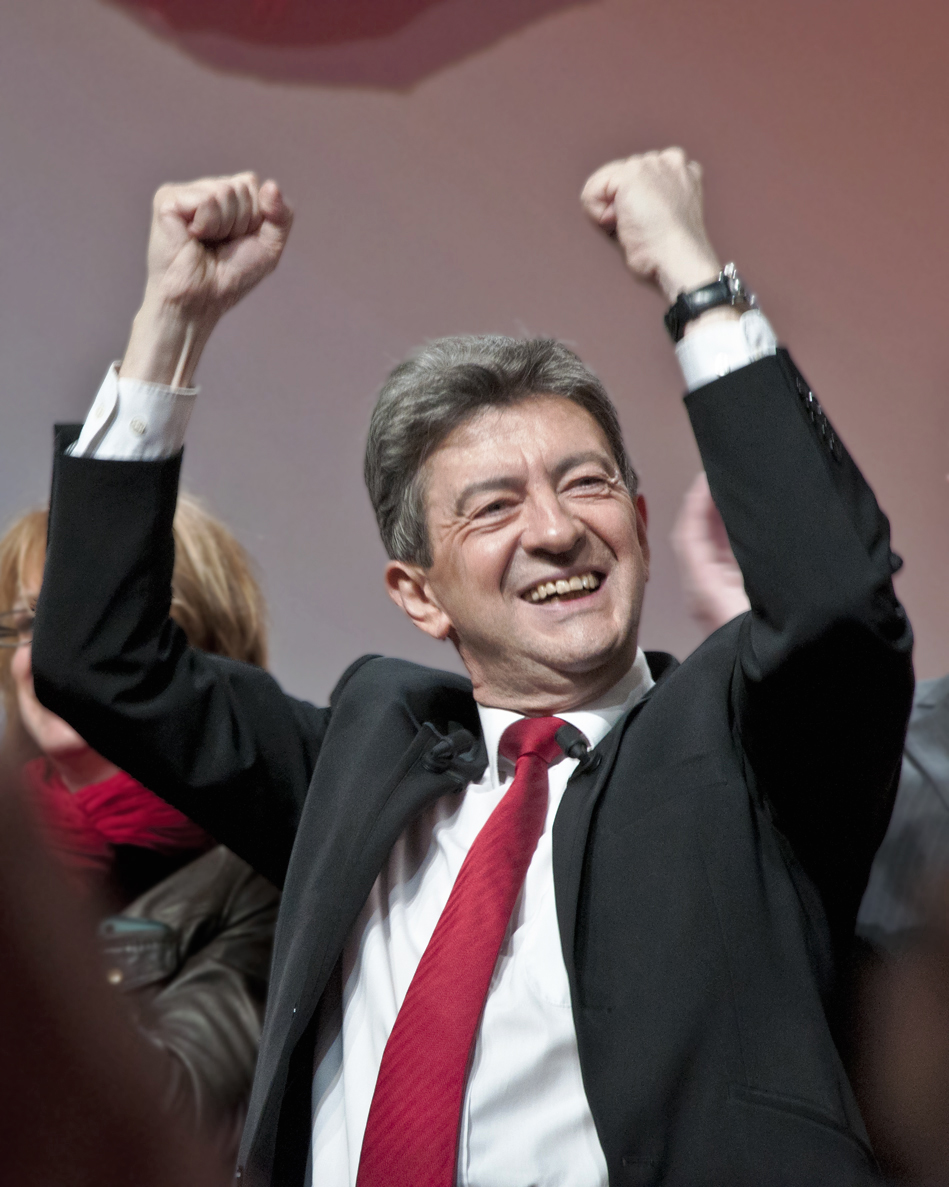
Jean-Luc Mélenchon, founder and leader of La France Insoumise

France has a long tradition of left-wing populism. During the French Revolution, the Hébertists, founded by Jacques Hébert in 1791, were a radical faction within the Society of the Friends of the Rights of Man and of the Citizen, a Jacobin group leading France during the Reign of Terror. They were most known for their militant opposition to the more moderate leadership of Georges Danton and supported dechristianization. They were also supportive of sending Louis XVI to the guillotine. Eventually, the Committee of Public Safety threatening, eventually charging Hébert with conspiracy and sending him to the guillotine.

In the modern day, La France Insoumise, or "France Unbowed" is a left-wing populist, democratic socialist, and eco-socialist party. The party is led by its founder, the populist firebrand Jean-Luc Mélenchon.

==== Germany ====
The Party of Democratic Socialism was explicitly studied under left-wing populism, especially by German academics. The party was formed after the reunification of Germany, and it was similar to right-wing populists in that it relied on anti-elitism and media attention provided by charismatic leadership. The party competed for the same voter base with the right-wing populists to some extent, although it relied on a more serious platform in Eastern Germany. This was limited by anti-immigration sentiments preferred by some voters, although the lines were, for example, crossed by Oskar Lafontaine, who used a term previously associated with the Nazi Party, Fremdarbeiter ('foreign workers'), in his election campaign in 2005. The PDS merged into the Left Party in 2007. The Left Party is also viewed as a left-wing populist party, but it is not the basis of the party as a whole.

==== Greece ====
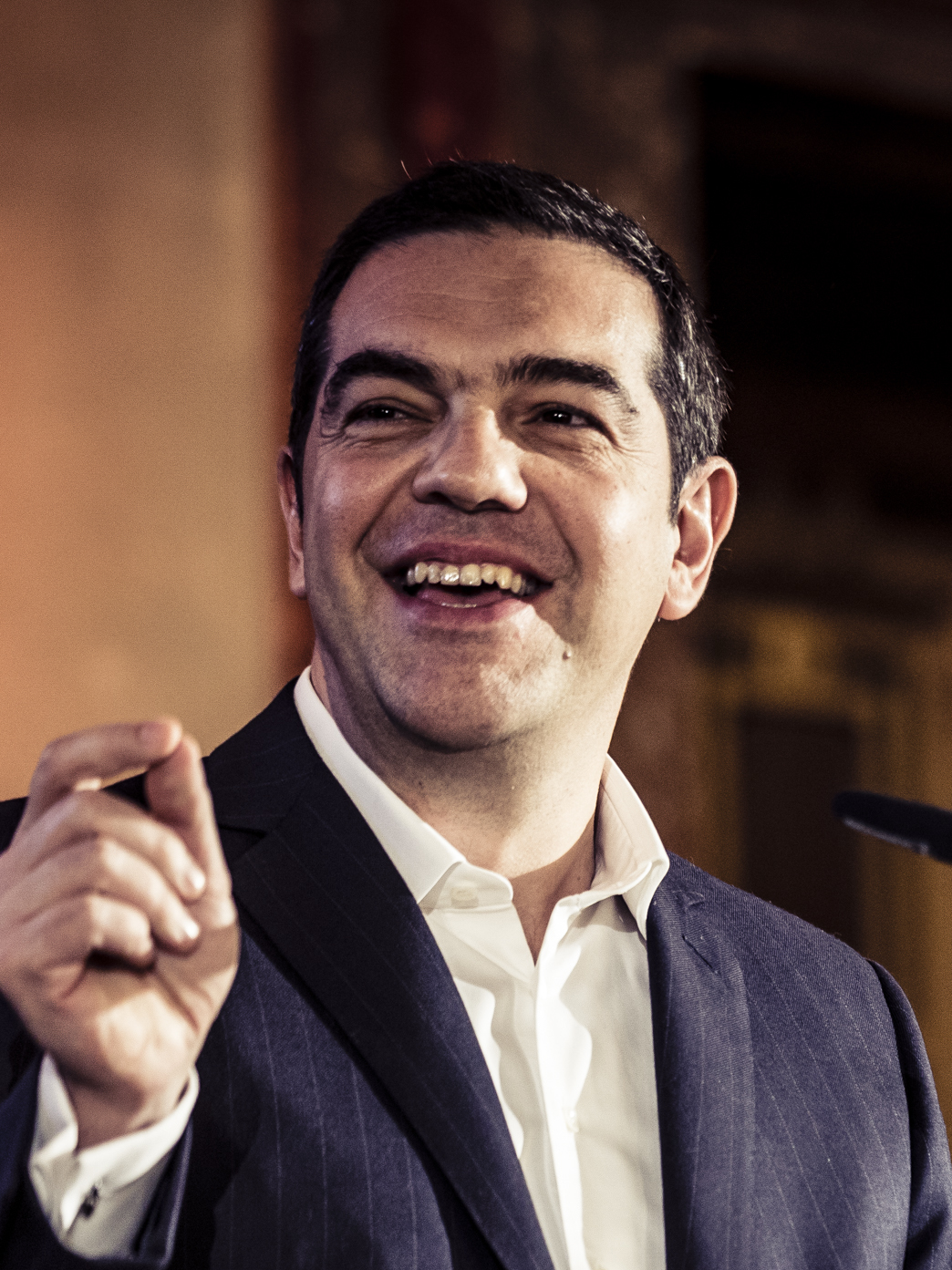
Alexis Tsipras of the Greek Syriza party

Syriza, which became the largest party since January 2015 elections, has been described as a left-wing populist party after its platform incorporated most demands of the popular movements in Greece during the government-debt crisis. Populist traits in Syriza's platform include the growing importance of "the People" in their rhetoric and "us/the people against them/the establishment" antagonism in campaigning. On immigration and LGBT rights, Syriza is inclusionary. Syriza itself does not accept the label "populist".

==== Ireland ====
Sinn Féin is generally considered an Irish republican, Irish nationalist, democratic socialist, and left-leaning populist political party.

==== Italy ====
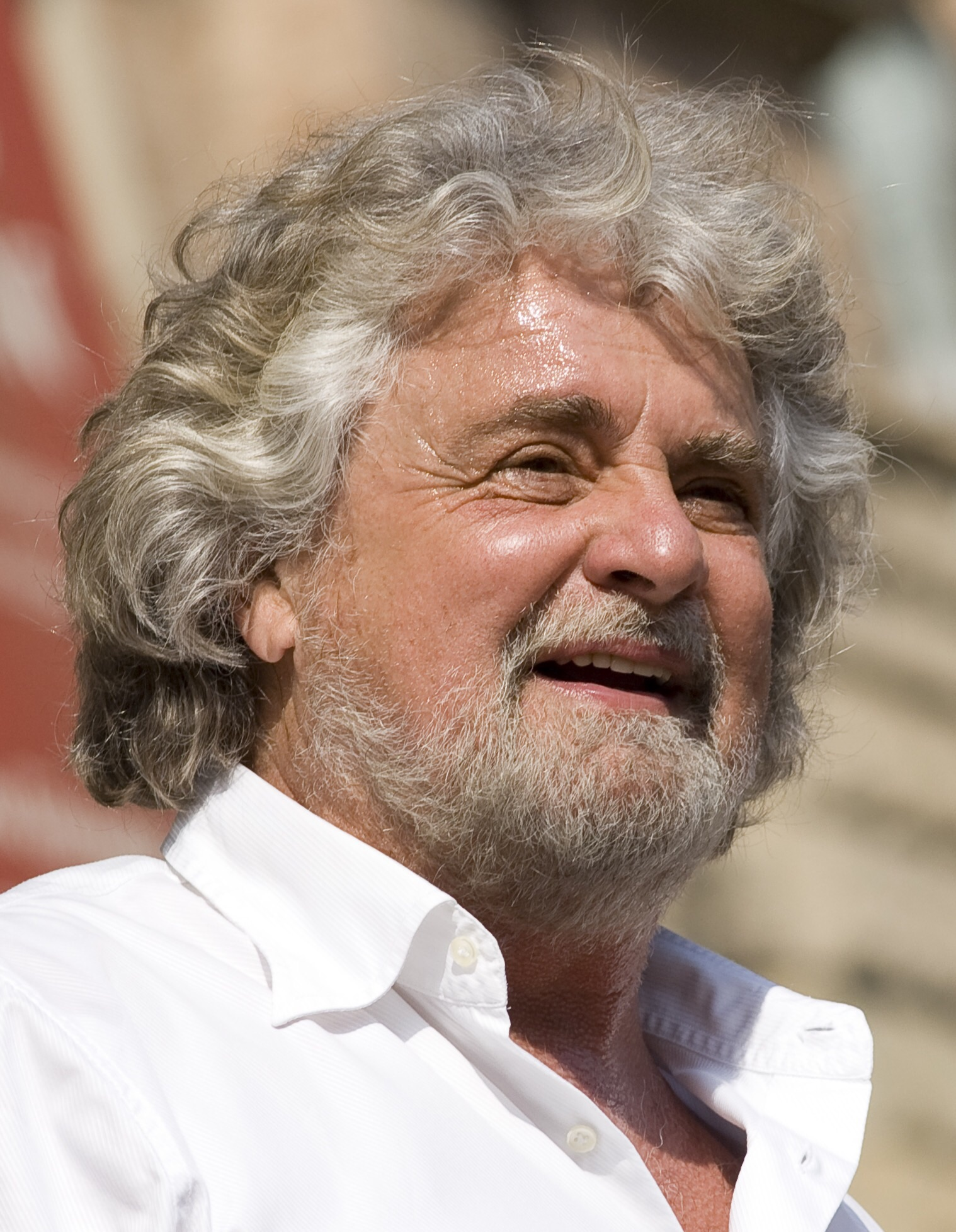
Beppe Grillo, founder of the M5S, generally considered a big tent populist party with some left-wing tendencies

The Italian Five Star Movement (M5S), which became the largest party in the 2018 general election, has often been described as a big tent populist party, but sometimes also as a left-wing populist movement; the "five stars", which are a reference to five critical issues for the party, are public water, sustainable transport, sustainable development, right to Internet access, and environmentalism, typical proposals of left-wing populist parties. However, despite its background in left-wing politics, the M5S has often expressed right-wing views on immigration.

In September 2019, the M5S formed a government with the centre-left Democratic Party (PD) and the left-wing Free and Equal (LeU), with Giuseppe Conte at its head. The government has been sometimes referred to as a left-wing populist cabinet.

Since 2021, when Conte assumed the leadership of the party, the M5S shifted towards more stable and consistent left-wing positions.

==== Netherlands ====
The Socialist Party has run a left-wing populist platform after dropping its communist course in 1991. Although some have pointed out that the party has become less populist over the years, it still includes anti-elitism in its recent election manifestos. It opposes what it sees as the European superstate.

==== Romania ====
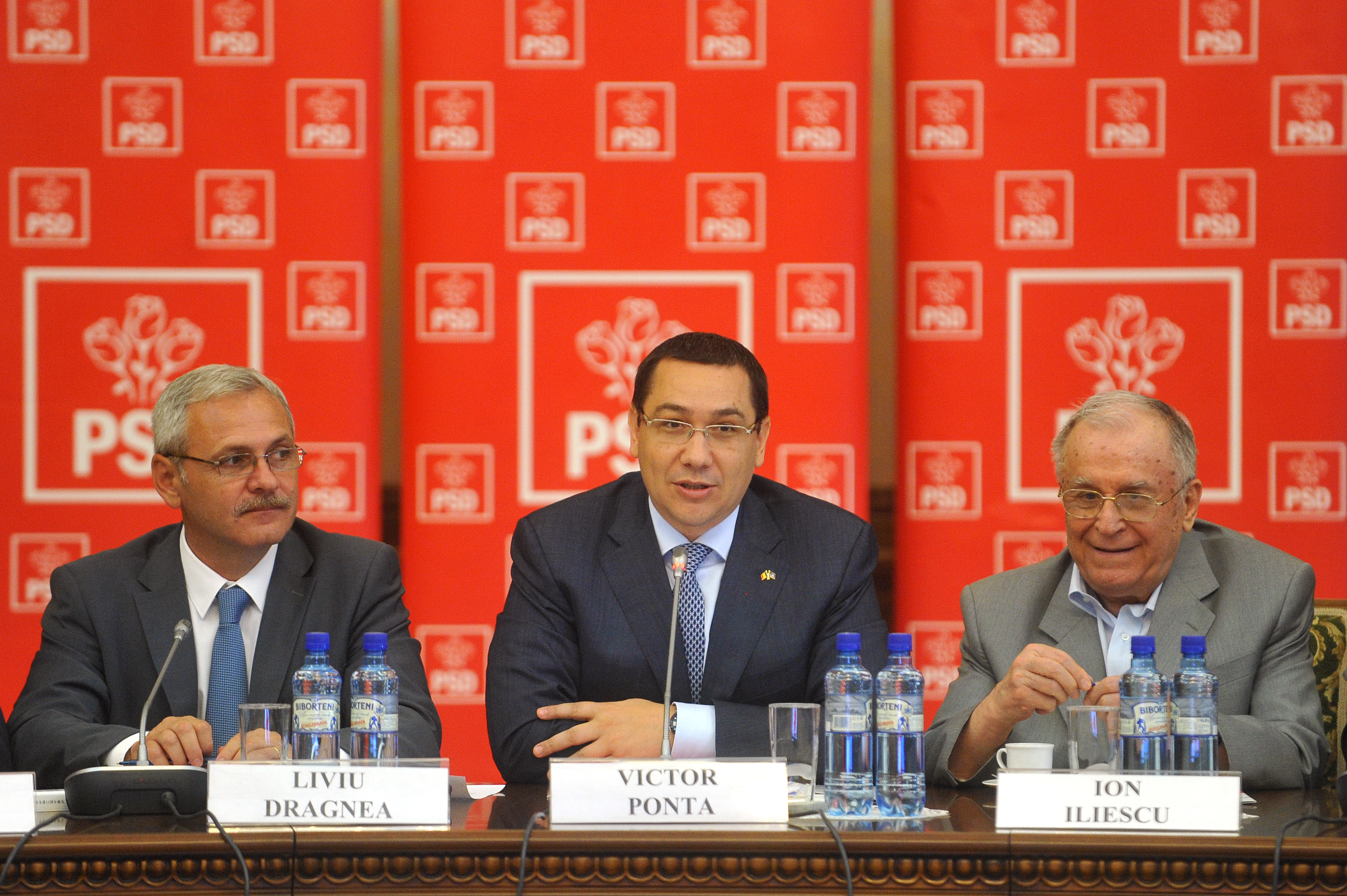
From the left to the right: Liviu Dragnea, Victor Ponta and Ion Iliescu

Since its foundation, the Social Democratic Party (PSD) has been described as left-wing populist and left-wing nationalist. Political analyst Radu Magdin described the PSD as a big tent catch-all pragmatic party with a strong populist rhetoric. Under the leadership of Victor Ponta and Liviu Dragnea, PSD was also sovereigntist.

==== Spain ====
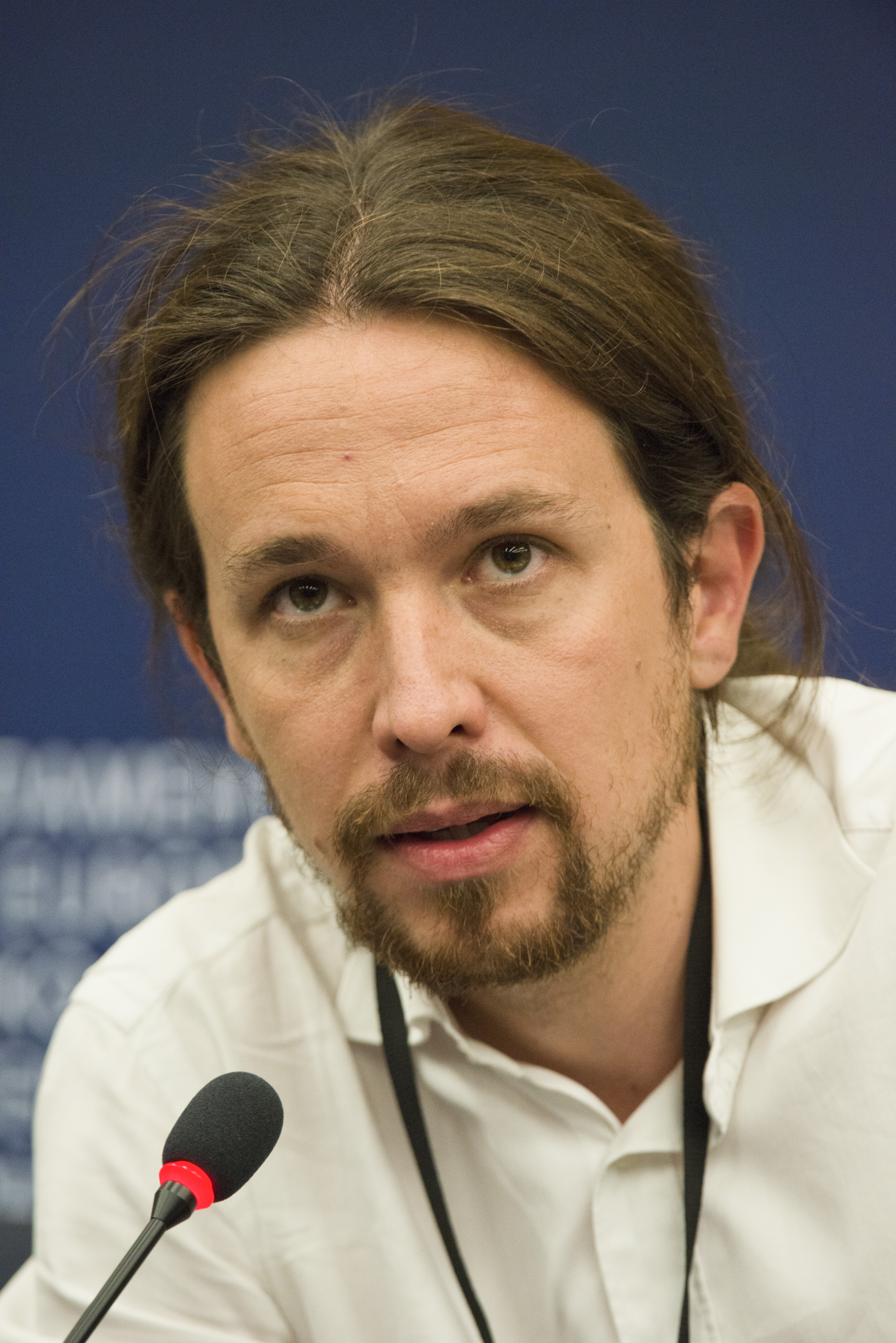
Pablo Iglesias, leader of Podemos

The left-wing populist party Podemos achieved 8% of the national vote in the 2014 European Parliament election. Due to avoiding nativist language typical of right-wing populists, Podemos can attract left-wing voters disappointed with the political establishment without taking sides in the regional political struggle. In the 2015 election for the national parliament, Podemos reached 20.65% of the vote and became the third largest party in the parliament after the conservative People's Party with 28.71% and the Spanish Socialist Workers' Party with 22.02%. In the new parliament, Podemos holds 69 out of 350 seats, which has resulted in the end of the traditional two-party system in Spain. In a November 2018 interview with Jacobin, Íñigo Errejón argues that Podemos requires a new "national-popular" strategy to win more elections.

==== Ukraine ====
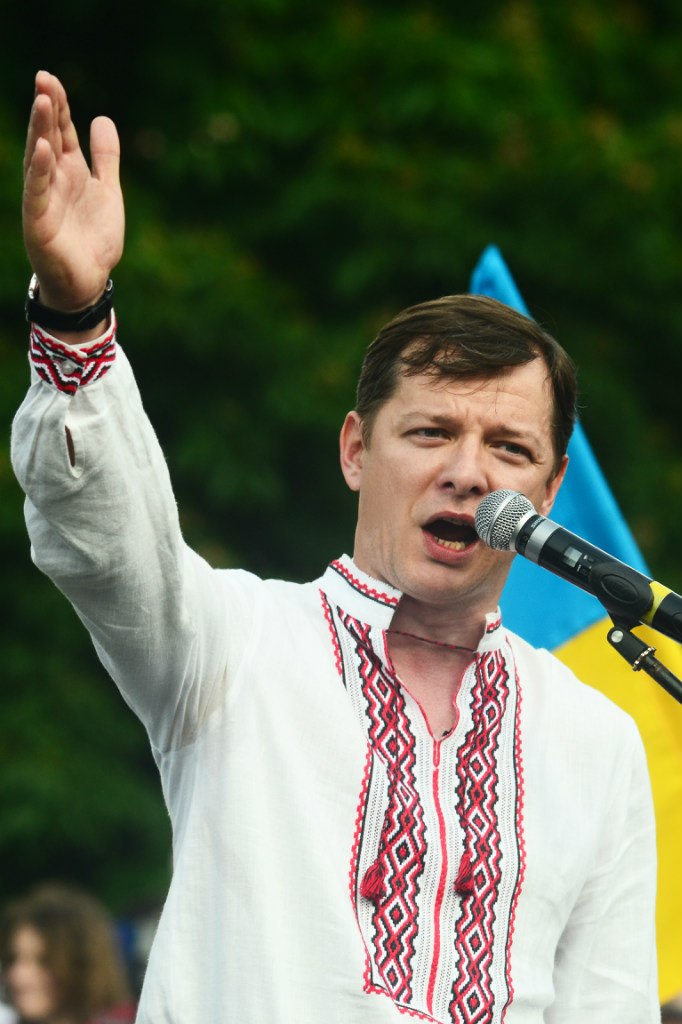
Oleh Liashko, leader of the Radical Party of Oleh Liashko

In contemporary Ukrainian politics, the Radical Party of Oleh Liashko is generally speaking considered a left-wing populist party with anti-oligarch and left-wing nationalist stances. The party is also considered social democratic, and supports Ukraine's ascension into NATO and the European Union. Batkivshchyna is also sometimes considered to be a left-wing populist and more mainstream National Democrat and pro-European party.

Not all Ukrainian left-wing populists oppose Russian influence, however. In 1993, the Communist Party of Ukraine was founded by Petro Symonenko, a former apparatchik of the Ukrainian Soviet Socialist Republic. Generally, the party is a continuation of the Soviet-era Communist Party of Ukraine, the same one which oversaw the implementation of the Holodomor. The party primarily opposed decommunization laws. Some critics say the party is not really communist but rather a kind of conservative pro-Russian party with the aesthetic of Soviet communism and the Soviet Union. The party has similar views to the Communist Party of the Russian Federation. Following the Revolution of Dignity, the Communist Party of Ukraine lost popular support outside the far east due to its pro-Yanukovych stance, especially after it voted for the anti-protest laws, which were universally seen as a major step in democratic backsliding by many Ukrainians. The role of the Communist Party of Ukraine in financing Donbas separatist movements and the Donetsk and Luhansk People's Republic has been disputed, with credible reports of the party providing some materiel support to the Russian backed separatists, though this is denied by the CPU. After showing support for Putin following Russia's unprovoked invasion of Ukraine in 2022, the Communist Party of Ukraine, alongside other pro-Soviet or pro-Putin political parties, were banned by the Ukrainian government.

== Left-wing populist political parties ==
=== Active left-wing populist parties or parties with left-wing populist factions ===
==== Represented in national legislatures ====
- Albania – Socialist Party of Albania
- Argentina – Union for the Homeland
- Australia – Australian Greens
- Belgium – Workers' Party of Belgium
- Bulgaria – Bulgarian Socialist Party
- Bolivia – Movement for Socialism
- Belarus — Belaya Rus
- Brazil – Workers' Party, Communist Party of Brazil, Socialism and Liberty Party
- Chile – Broad Front (factions), Chile Digno
- Colombia – Alternative Democratic Pole, Colombia Humana
- Cyprus – Progressive Party of Working People
- Denmark – Red–Green Alliance, Inuit Ataqatigiit, Republic
- Dominican Republic – Dominican Liberation Party (factions)
- Ecuador – Citizen Revolution Movement
- Europe – Party of the European Left, European Left Alliance for the People and the Planet
- Finland – Left Alliance
- France – La France Insoumise
- Germany – The Left
- Greece – Syriza
- Haiti – Platfòm Pitit Desalin
- Honduras – Libertad y Refundación (Libre)
- India – Communist Party of India (Marxist), Communist Party of India
- Indonesia – Indonesian Democratic Party of Struggle
- Ireland – Northern Ireland – Sinn Féin, People Before Profit–Solidarity
- Italy – Democratic Party (factions), Five Star Movement (factions)
- Japan – Reiwa Shinsengumi
- Kosovo – Vetëvendosje
- Luxembourg – The Left
- Mexico – Morena, Labor Party
- Mongolia – Mongolian People's Party
- Netherlands – Socialist Party
- Nicaragua – Sandinista National Liberation Front
- Norway – Red Party
- Paraguay – Guasú Front
- Peru – Free Peru
- Portugal – Left Bloc
- Romania – Social Democratic Party
- Russia – Communist Party of the Russian Federation (factions), For a New Socialism
- San Marino – United Left, Active Citizenship
- Serbia – Socialist Party of Serbia, Movement of Socialists
- South Africa – Economic Freedom Fighters
- South Korea - Progressive Party
- Spain – Podemos, Más Madrid, United Left, Comuns
- Sri Lanka - National People's Power
- Sweden – Left Party
- Taiwan – Taiwan People's Party
- Turkey – Peoples' Democratic Party, Workers' Party of Turkey
- United States – Democratic Party (factions), Democratic Socialists of America
- Venezuela – United Socialist Party of Venezuela
- Zimbabwe – ZANU–PF

==== Not represented in national legislatures ====
- Austria – Communist Party of Austria
- Chile – Equality Party, Progressive Party
- Czechia – Communist Party of Bohemia and Moravia, The Left
- Estonia – Estonian United Left Party
- Finland – Communist Party of Finland
- Georgia – Georgian Labour Party
- Germany – Sahra Wagenknecht Alliance - Reason and Justice
- Greece – Popular Unity
- India – Samajwadi Party, Rashtriya Janata Dal, Trinamool Congress
- Indonesia – Just and Prosperous People's Party, New Labour Party
- Italy – Communist Refoundation Party, Democracy and Autonomy, Power to the People
- Iran – People's Mujahedin of Iran
- Malaysia – Socialist Party of Malaysia
- Namibia – Namibian Economic Freedom Fighters
- Poland – No notable left-populist party represented either in the Sejm or extra-parliamentarily. Formerly notably Self-Defence (largely defunct; re-registered in 2021 but webpage defunct as of 2026), though dissolved in 2012 following leader Andrzej Lepper's controversial death. Self-Defence offshoots exist, but all are minor, many remain officially registered but inactive in practice:
  - Self-Defence (minor offshoot; webpage defunct as of 2026)
  - Self-Defence Rebirth (minor offshoots; multiple parties registered under this name, some defunct or not officially registered)
  - Peasants' Party (minor offshoot; webpage defunct as of 2020)
  - Social Movement (minor offshoot; webpage defunct as of 2016)
  - Slavic Union (related minor Russophilic party)
- Russia – Patriots of Russia, Left Bloc, Left Front, Russian Socialist Movement
- Serbia – Party of the Radical Left
- Slovakia – Socialists.sk
- Taiwan – New Power Party
- Turkey – Patriotic Party (Turkey)
- Ukraine – Communist Party of Ukraine
- United Kingdom – Scottish Socialist Party, Northern Independence Party, Workers Party of Britain

== See also ==
- Chantal Mouffe
- Chavismo
- Democratic socialism
- Equalitarianism
- Ernesto Laclau
- Jacobin (politics)
- Kirchnerism
- Lulism
- Lumpenproletariat
- Left-liberalism
  - Classical radicalism
  - Left-libertarianism
- Left-wing nationalism
- Narodniks
- Neopopulism
- New Left
- Pink tide
- Popular socialism
- Post-capitalism
- Post-neoliberalism
- Progressivism
  - Economic progressivism
  - Progressive liberalism
- Redwashing
- Right-wing populism
- Social democracy
- Socialism of the 21st century
- Welfare state
