= Kusuo Oshima =

Japanese politician

- 大島 九州男
- Oshima in 2018

Member of the House of Councillors
- Incumbent
- Assumed office 18 January 2023
- Preceded by: Hakase Suidobashi
- Constituency: National PR
- In office 29 July 2007 – 28 July 2019
- Constituency: National PR

Member of the Nōgata City Council
- In office 1991–2003

Personal details
- Born: 11 June 1961 (age 65) Nōgata, Fukuoka, Japan
- Party: Reiwa Shinsengumi (since 2020)
- Other political affiliations: Independent (1991–2003); DPJ (2003–2016); DP (2016–2018); DPP (2018–2020)
- Education: Nihon University

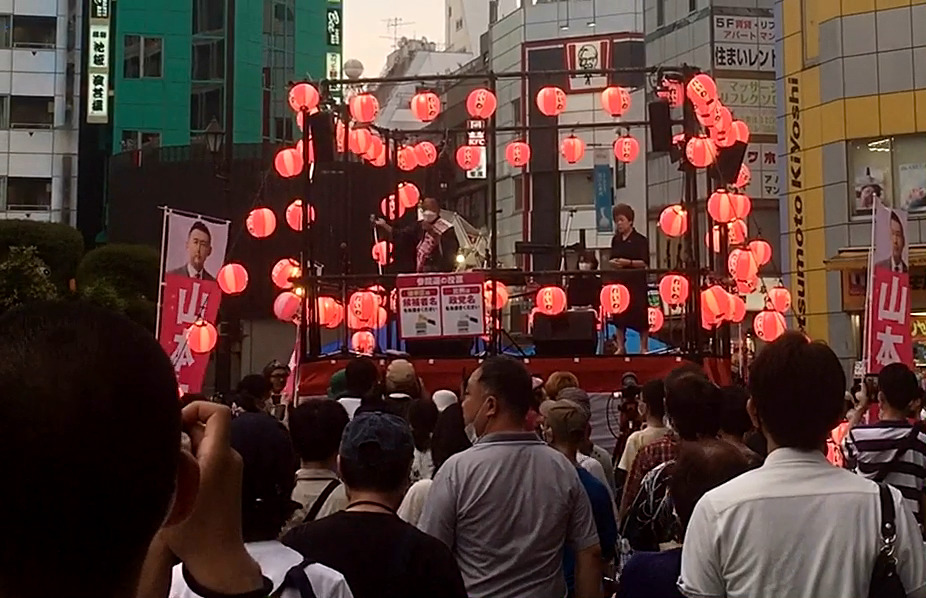
Kusuo Oshima (left) and a sign language interpreter (right) at a political rally in Ikebukuro, 2022

Kusuo Oshima (大島 九州男, Ōshima Kusuo; born June 11, 1961) is a Japanese politician of the Democratic Party of Japan, a member of the House of Councillors in the Diet (national legislature). A native of Nogata, Fukuoka and graduate of Nihon University, he served in the city assembly of Nogata. After two unsuccessful runs for the House of Representatives in 2003 and 2005, he was elected to the House of Councillors for the first time in 2007.
