= Daisuke Tenbata =

Japanese politician

- 天畠 大輔
- Tenbata in 2022

Member of the House of Councillors
- Incumbent
- Assumed office 26 July 2022
- Constituency: National PR

Personal details
- Born: 29 December 1981 (age 44) Kure, Hiroshima, Japan
- Party: Reiwa Shinsengumi
- Education: Japan Lutheran College; Ritsumeikan University

Daisuke Tenbata (born 29 December 1981) is a Japanese politician and a researcher. He was awarded PhD from Ritsumeikan University in 2019. A member of Reiwa Shinsengumi, he has been an incumbent in the House of Councilors since 2022 as part of the proportional representation block. He developed a severe disability at the age of 14 due to a medical malpractice incident, and refers to himself as 'the most severely physically disabled researcher in Japan.'
