= Akiko Ōishi =

Japanese politician born 1977

Akiko Oishi
- 大石 晃子
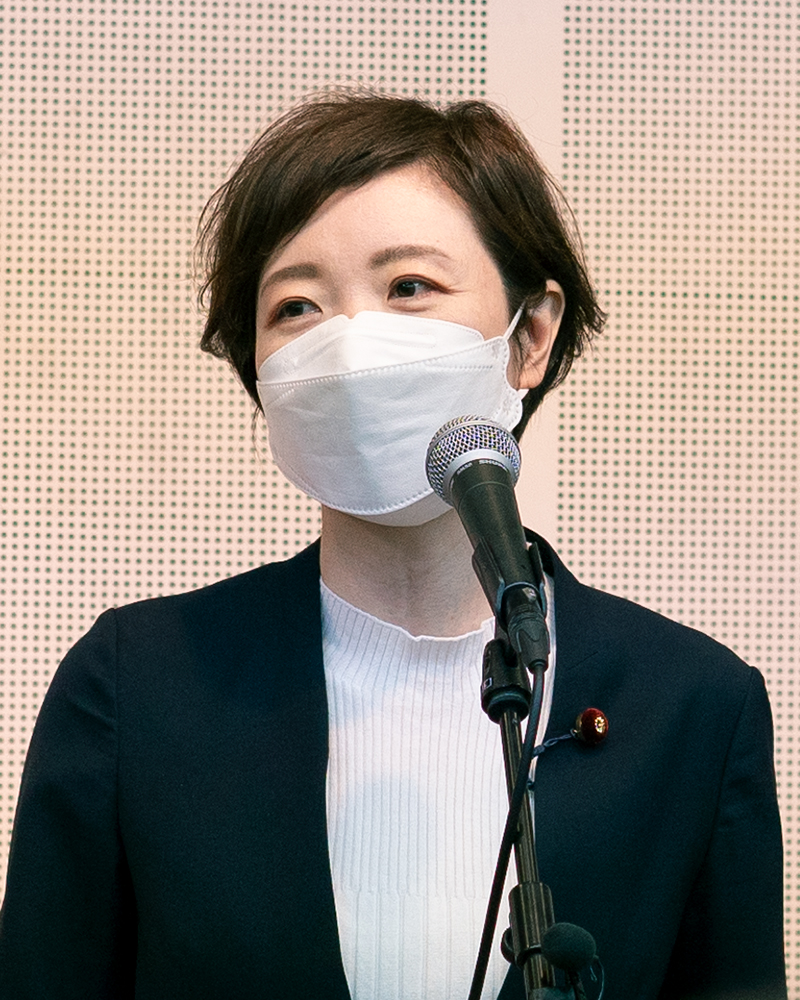
- Oishi in 2020

Member of the House of Representatives
- In office 5 November 2021 – 23 January 2026
- Constituency: Kinki PR

Personal details
- Born: 27 May 1977 (age 49) Osaka, Japan
- Party: Independent
- Other political affiliations: Reiwa Shinsengumi (2020–2026)
- Education: Osaka University (MEng)

Akiko Ōishi (Japanese: 大石 晃子, Hepburn: Ōishi Akiko; born 27 May 1977) is a Japanese politician. A former member of Reiwa Shinsengumi, she served as a member of the House of Representatives for the Kinki proportional representation block from 2021 to 2026. She was a co-representative and policy council chairperson of Reiwa Shinsengumi until her resignation on 9 July 2026.

== Career ==
Oishi graduated from Osaka City Shiokusa Elementary School, Osaka Prefectural Kitano High School, and Osaka University Faculty of Engineering. She completed a master's degree in environmental engineering at Osaka University Graduate School of Engineering. In 2002, she joined the Osaka Prefectural Office.

On 21 February 2020, Taro Yamamoto, the representative of the Reiwa Shinsengumi, announced that he would field Oishi in Osaka's 5th district for the next House of Representatives election. She finished third in the single-seat constituency behind Toru Kunishige of the New Komeito Party and Takeshi Miyamoto of the Japanese Communist Party, but in the proportional Kinki bloc, where there were multiple candidates, she ranked lowest out of 28 seats, at 28th place, and Reiwa Shinsengumi won one seat. However, Oishi, who had the highest sekihairitsu among the five people ranked first on the list, secured her seat and was elected for the first time. She was a member of the Budget Committee of the House of Representatives.

On 18 December 2022, she ran for the Reiwa Shinsengumi representative election in a joint campaign with Mari Kushibuchi, but lost to Taro Yamamoto. The following day, Yamamoto nominated Oishi and Kushibuchi as party co-representatives.

In April 2025, Oishi received wide-spread press coverage in Japan for calling for the abolition of the consumption tax and stating that Shigeru Ishiba should resign rather than visit the United States to discuss tariffs during a Diet session. This was met by heckling from LDP members.

She resigned as co-representative of Reiwa Shinsengumi on 9 July 2026 alongside the resignation of then-party leader Taro Yamamoto.
