= Hakase Suidobashi =

Japanese comedian (born 1962)

- 水道橋 博士
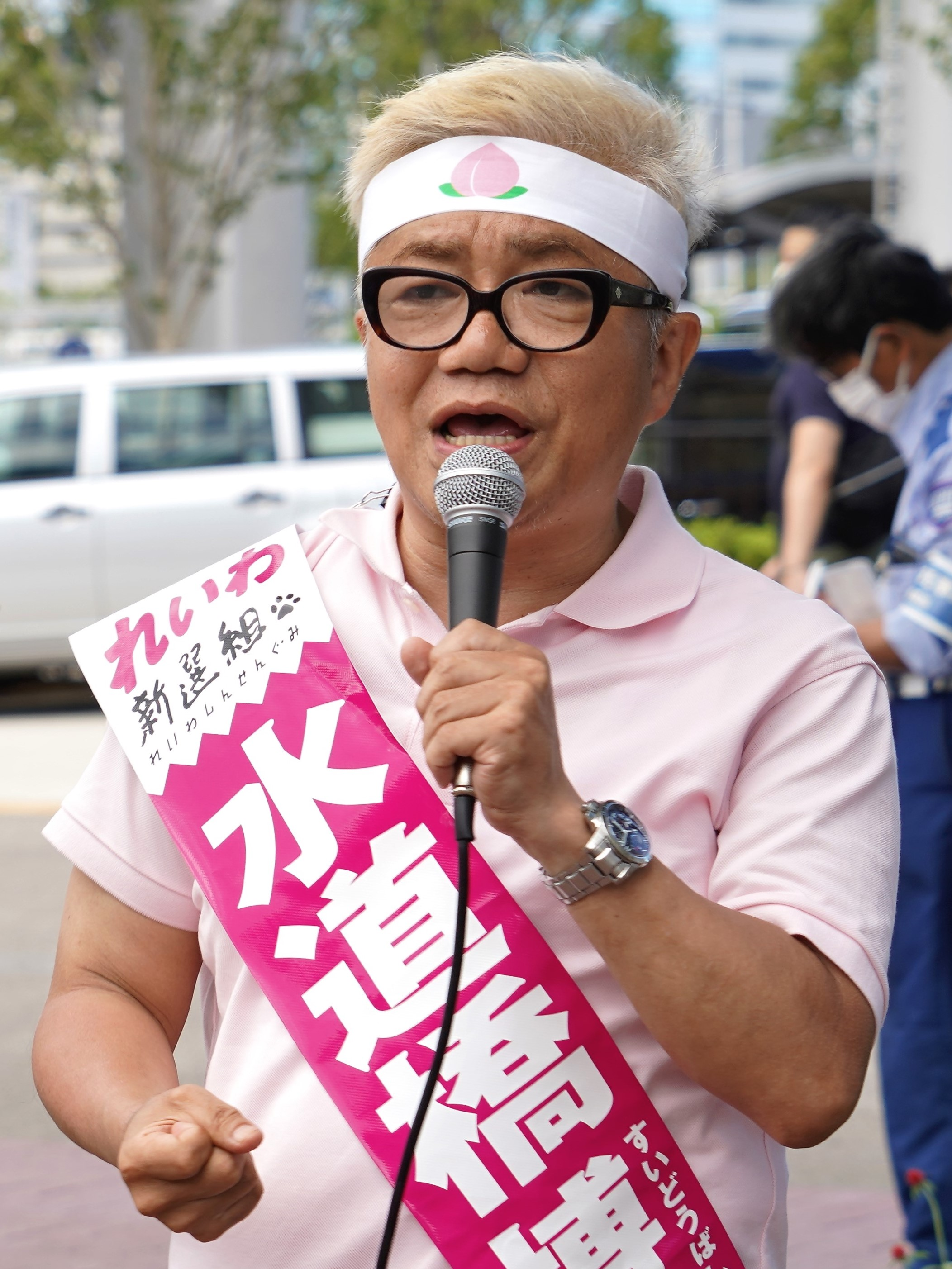
- Suidobashi in 2022

Member of the House of Councillors
- In office 26 July 2022 – 16 January 2023
- Preceded by: Multi-member district
- Succeeded by: Kusuo Oshima
- Constituency: National PR

Personal details
- Born: Masayoshi Ono; 18 August 1962 (age 64) Kurashiki, Okayama, Japan
- Party: Reiwa Shinsengumi
- Education: The Elementary and Junior High School Attached to the Faculty of Education, Okayama University; Okayama Prefectural Kurashiki Seiryo High School; Meiji University School of Business
- Occupation: Comedian, politician
- Other name: Hakase (博士)
- Years active: 1987–
- Agent: Office Kitano
- Known for: Ojisans Eleven; Hei! Say! A Board of Education; Presat!
- Height: 1.61 m (5 ft 3 in)

Hakase Suidobashi (水道橋 博士, Suidōbashi Hakase; born 18 August 1962 in Kurashiki, Okayama, Japan) is a Japanese comedian who is a member of the comedy duo Asakusa Kid. His real name is Masayoshi Ono (小野 正芳, Ono Masayoshi).

Suidobashi is represented with Office Kitano.

He is also a manzai comedian, commentator, and a writer in magazine columns and essays.

== Filmography ==
=== TV series ===
==== Current appearances ====
Year	Title	Network	Notes
	Jōhō Live: Miyaneya	YTV	Monday commentator
2013	Hou-dou-ryouku	KSB	
	Presat!	THK	Main commentator, later presenter
	Contact Cafe C	NBN	Presenter
	Tetsujin no Kokuhaku	NBN	Narrator
	Shittoku Chizu-chō	NHK E	

==== Former appearances ====
Year	Title	Network	Notes
2006	Nekketsu! Heisei Kyōiku Gakuin	Fuji TV	
2007	Hakase mo Shiranai Nippon no Ura	Miranca	
2009	Hakase no Ijō na Teidan	MXTV	
2009	Keiko Kojima: Kirakira	TBS Radio	Friday partner
2010	Sōgō Shinryō-i Doctor G	NHK BShi, later NHK TV	
	Takajin no Money	TV Osaka	
	Nippon Dandy	MXTV	Friday Dandy
	Hakase Suidobashi no 80-nen Dai Densetsu	Kayo Pops Channel	
	Endan	NotTV	
	TV o Homeru Yes TV	NotTV	

==== As a guest ====
Year	Title	Network
2011	Kira Kira Afro	TV Osaka
2012	Masahiko Ueyanagi: Gogoban!	NBS
	Himitsu no Kenmin Show	YTV
	Asaichi	NHK TV

=== Radio ===
Title	Network	Notes
Suppin!	NHK Radio 1	Thursday personality

=== TV Dramas ===
Year	Title	Role	Network
1999	Furuhata Ninzaburō	Goro Owada	Fuji TV

=== Films ===
Year	Title	Role	Notes	Ref.
2013	Why Don't You Play in Hell?	Cop		
2015	Love & Peace	Commentator		
2023	September 1923	Hideyoshi Hasegawa		

== Bibliography ==
=== Books ===
Year	Title
1995	Hakase Suidobashi no Ijōna Aijō: Matawa Watashi wa Ikanishite Shinpai Suru no o Tomete Fūzoku to AV o Aisuru yō ni Natta ka
2005	Hongyō: Tarento Hon 50-satsu Dotō no Home-goroshi!
2006	Hakase no Ijōna Kenkō
2007	Kinniku Baka no Kabe: Hakase no Ijōna Kenkō Part 2
2012	Gei hito Shunjū

=== Serials ===
Title
Hakase Suidobashi no Chinchin Nikki
Hakase Suidobashi ga Kataru Hakase no Hanashi
Hakase Suidobashi no Meruma Junpō
