= Ayumi Yasutomi =

Japanese economist

Ayumi Yasutomi (安冨 歩, Yasutomi Ayumi; born March 22, 1963) is a Japanese economist and politician. She is a professor at the Institute of Advanced Studies on Asia at the University of Tokyo. Yasutomi came out as a transgender woman in 2014.

== Education ==
Yasutomi graduated from Kyoto University in 1991 with a degree in economics and continued to graduate with a PhD in 1997 on the financial history of Manchuria.

== Career ==
Yasutomi's first tenured post was as a Visiting Research Associate at the London School of Economics, 1996–7. In 1997 Yasutomi was employed as assistant professor at Nagoya University until moving to the University of Tokyo in 2000. In 2009, Yasutomi was promoted to Professor, after holding several assistant professor roles within the university.

She is a specialist in the economics of Manchuria, whose research received a Nikkei Economics Culture Award. Other research interests include the socio-ecology of East Asia, theoretical economics, population dynamics, harassment theory, Peter Drucker and the thoughts of Confucius.

== Politics ==
In July 2018 Yasutomi ran as a candidate in the mayoral elections for Higashimatsuyama, near Tokyo. She lost to the current candidate Koichi Morita by a margin of 12,000 votes. In Yasutomi's campaign agenda, her main priority was a focus on bringing an end to child abuse. In 2019, Yasutomi was one of ten candidates from the new Reiwa Shinsengumi party to stand for election to the House of Councillors.

The film Reiwa Uprising was made about Yasutomi's attempt to be elected and was screened at the Tokyo Film Festival in 2019.

== See also ==
- List of transgender people
- Deirdre McCloskey
