= Yasuhiko Funago =

Japanese politician

- 舩後 靖彦
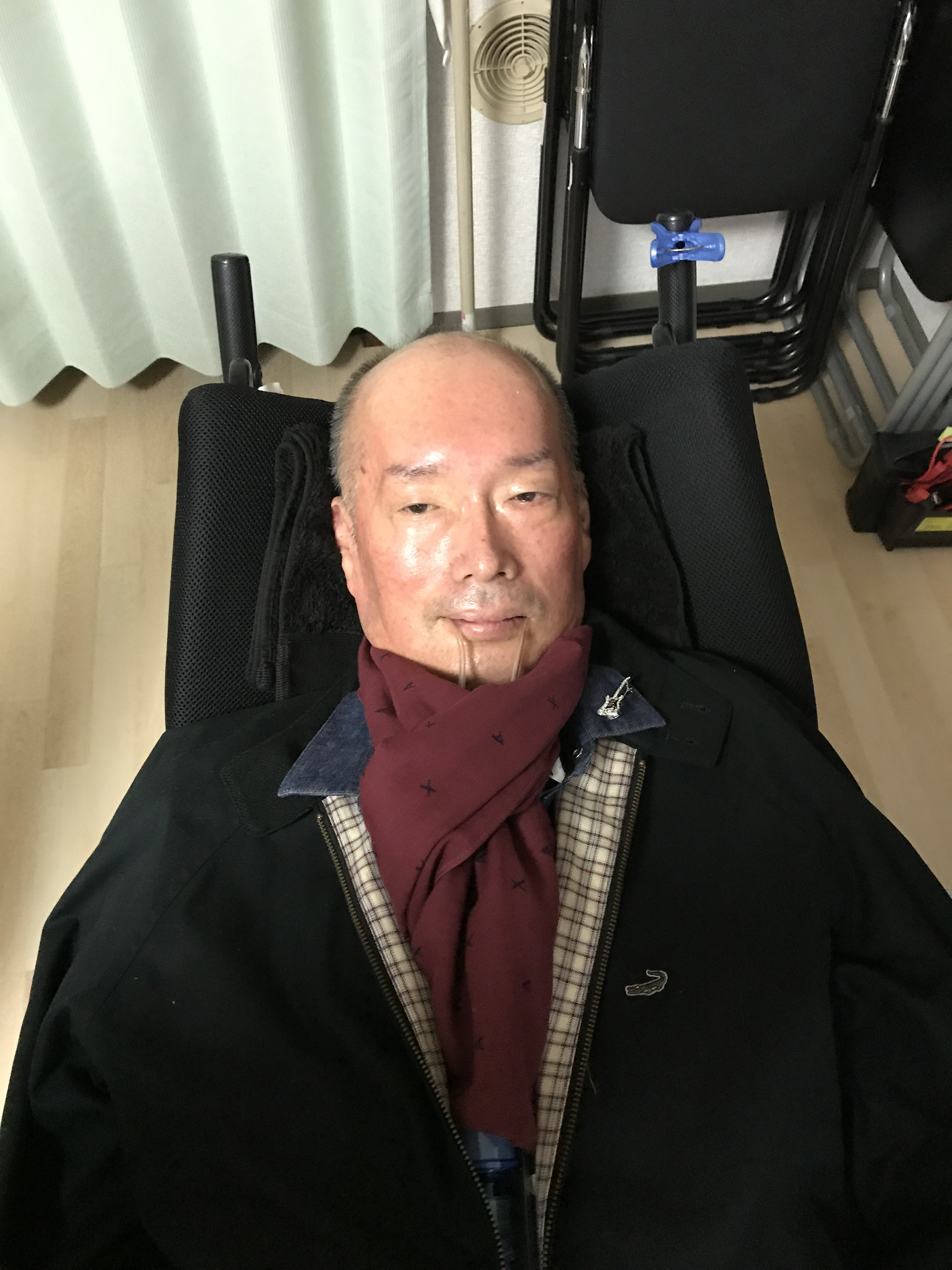
- Funago in 2019

Member of the House of Councillors
- In office 29 July 2019 – 28 July 2025
- Constituency: National PR

Personal details
- Born: 4 October 1957 (age 68) Gifu City, Gifu, Japan
- Party: Reiwa Shinsengumi
- Education: Takushoku University

Yasuhiko Funago (舩後靖彦, Funago Yasuhiko; born 4 October 1957) is a Japanese politician and former member of the House of Councillors. He and fellow councillor Eiko Kimura became the first people with severe disabilities elected to Japan's National Diet in 2019. He is a member of the Reiwa Shinsengumi.

ALS has caused him to lose much of his mobility, requiring a full-time caregiver.

== Early life ==
Funago was born in Gifu City, Gifu Prefecture. He moved to Chiba City, Chiba Prefecture when he was 10 years old and attended Chiba Minami Prefectural High School. After graduating high school, he studied under the Faculty of Political Science and Economics at Takushoku University.

Although he originally wanted to become a professional musician, Funago became an employee of Sakata Watch Trading Co., Ltd. after graduating university in 1982. A few years later, at the age of 28, he married.
