= Taro Yamamoto =

Japanese politician and former actor

- 山本 太郎
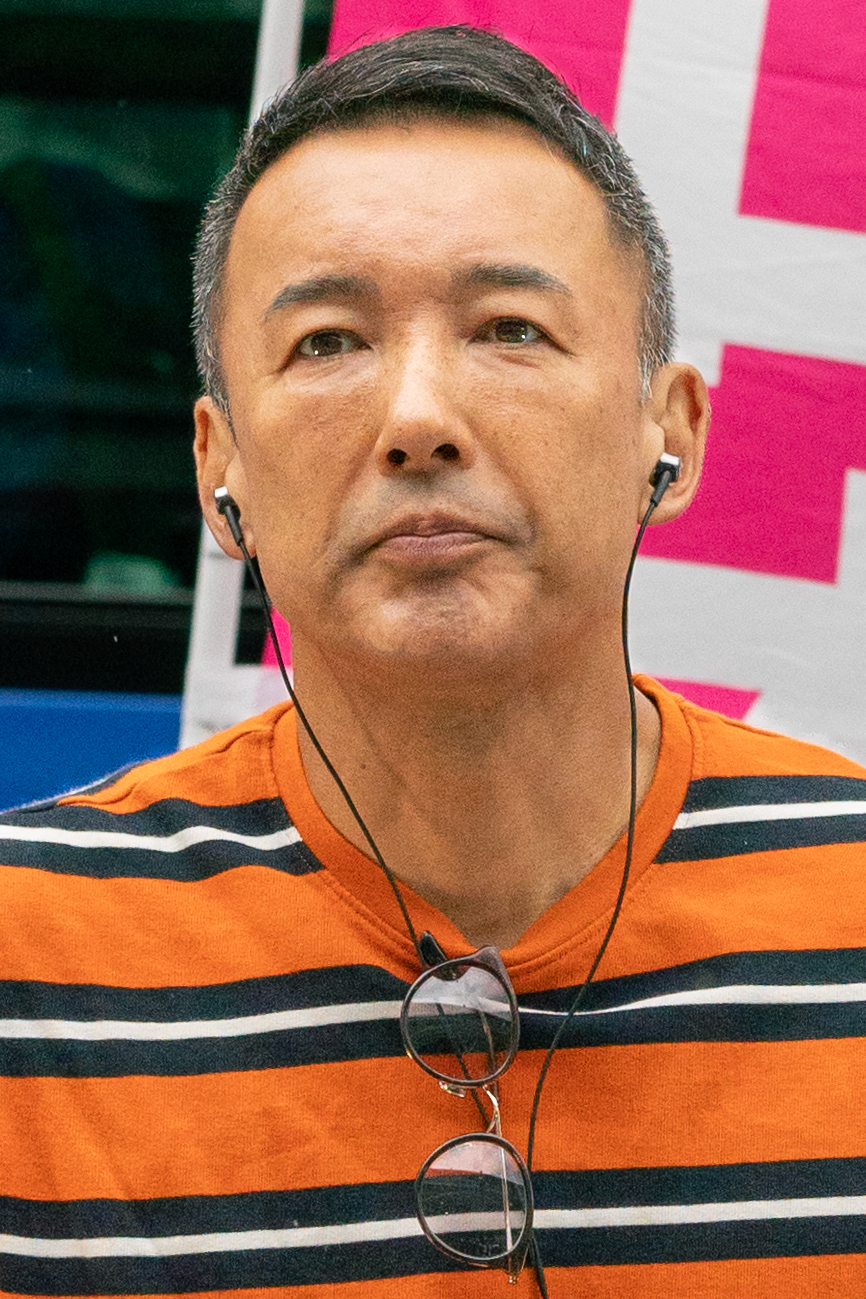
- Yamamoto in 2025

Leader of Reiwa Shinsengumi
- In office 1 April 2019 – 10 July 2026
- Preceded by: Position established
- Succeeded by: Joji Yamamoto

Member of the House of Councillors
- In office 25 July 2022 – 21 January 2026
- Preceded by: Toshio Ogawa
- Succeeded by: Vacant
- Constituency: Tokyo at-large
- In office 21 July 2013 – 21 July 2019
- Preceded by: Tamayo Marukawa
- Succeeded by: Ayaka Shiomura
- Constituency: Tokyo at-large

Member of the House of Representatives
- In office 31 October 2021 – 15 April 2022
- Preceded by: Multi-member district
- Succeeded by: Mari Kushibuchi
- Constituency: Tokyo PR

Personal details
- Born: 24 November 1974 (age 51) Takarazuka, Hyōgo, Japan
- Party: Reiwa Shinsengumi (since 2019)
- Other political affiliations: Independent (2011–2014); People's Life (2014–2016); Liberal (2016–2019)
- Occupation: Politician

Tarō Yamamoto (山本 太郎, Yamamoto Tarō; born 24 November 1974) is a Japanese politician and former actor, who is the founder and former leader of the anti-establishment political party Reiwa Shinsengumi. Yamamoto served in the House of Councillors representing Tokyo until his resignation in 2026, and previously served in the House of Representatives from 2021 to 2022. He unsuccessfully ran in the 2020 Tokyo gubernatorial election as a candidate under Reiwa.

== Early life and acting career ==
Yamamoto was born in Takarazuka, Hyogo; his father died shortly after his birth, and he and his two older sisters were raised by their mother, who sold Persian carpets. He said in his speech that when he was called to the principal's office when he was 11 years old and asked about his future dream, he answered, "Prime Minister".

Yamamoto began his career as a television personality in 1990, appearing in dramas such as Futarikko (1996–97) and Shinsengumi! (2004). He appeared in dozens of films, including Battle Royale (2000) and Moon Child (2003), winning a Blue Ribbon Award for Best Supporting Actor for the latter. He continued appearing in films and television until 2013.

== Political career ==
=== Independent (2011–2014) ===
Yamamoto entered politics after the Fukushima nuclear meltdown in March 2011. He announced that he "would no longer be a silent accomplice of the terrorist nation Japan", and became a protester in the anti-nuclear movement. He resigned from his talent agency some time later in order to focus on activism. Yamamoto, a resident of Tokyo, flew to Saga Prefecture in July and attempted, along with a local citizens' group, to enter the governor's office to protest the restart of a power plant. He chanted phrases such as, "Protect our children!", "We don't need nuclear energy!" and "Come out, Governor!". He did not get an audience with the governor, but said he was glad that he came. The scene was broadcast on television, and the Saga District Public Prosecutors Office considered pressing charges against Yamamoto. Following the incident, in early 2012, Yamamoto led a petition campaign in Tokyo to hold a referendum that would bar Tokyo Electric Power Company from continuing to run nuclear facilities.

He attempted to run for a seat in the House of Representatives during the 2012 general election, but placed second in the Tokyo 8th district and did not win a seat. He then ran an independent campaign (endorsed by the New Socialist Party) to be elected to the House of Councillors in the 2013 election, and was elected on 21 July. He was supported in the election by the People's Life Party, Social Democratic Party and Greens Japan.

On 31 October 2013, Yamamoto handed a political letter to the Emperor Akihito at a non-political garden party. The letter was immediately passed on to the chamberlain. Whether the letter was read by the Emperor is unknown. The letter reportedly contained his complaints about the handling of the nuclear disaster. The Huffington Post reported that the action may have violated the Constitution of Japan, since the Emperor is not allowed to involve himself in political issues. The Japanese Communist Party chairman Kazuo Shii inferred that Yamamoto "didn't understand the Constitution". Various political leaders expressed their anger and disappointment in Yamamoto's alleged abuse of his legislative position, as well as Takeshi Kitano, who called the incident "somewhat of an insult". However, the manga artist Yoshinori Kobayashi supported Yamamoto's actions. On 8 November, Yamamoto received an official reprimand from the Speaker of the House of Councillors, Masaaki Yamazaki. It was also announced that he will be banned from any kind of imperial events during his entire term.

In December 2013, he promised he would mobilize a million people to lay siege to the National Diet in protest of the State Secrecy Law. In the 19th Tokyo gubernatorial election held in February 2014, he didn't support any specific candidate, and called for supporting candidates that oppose nuclear power.

=== People's Life Party (PLP) (2014–2016) ===
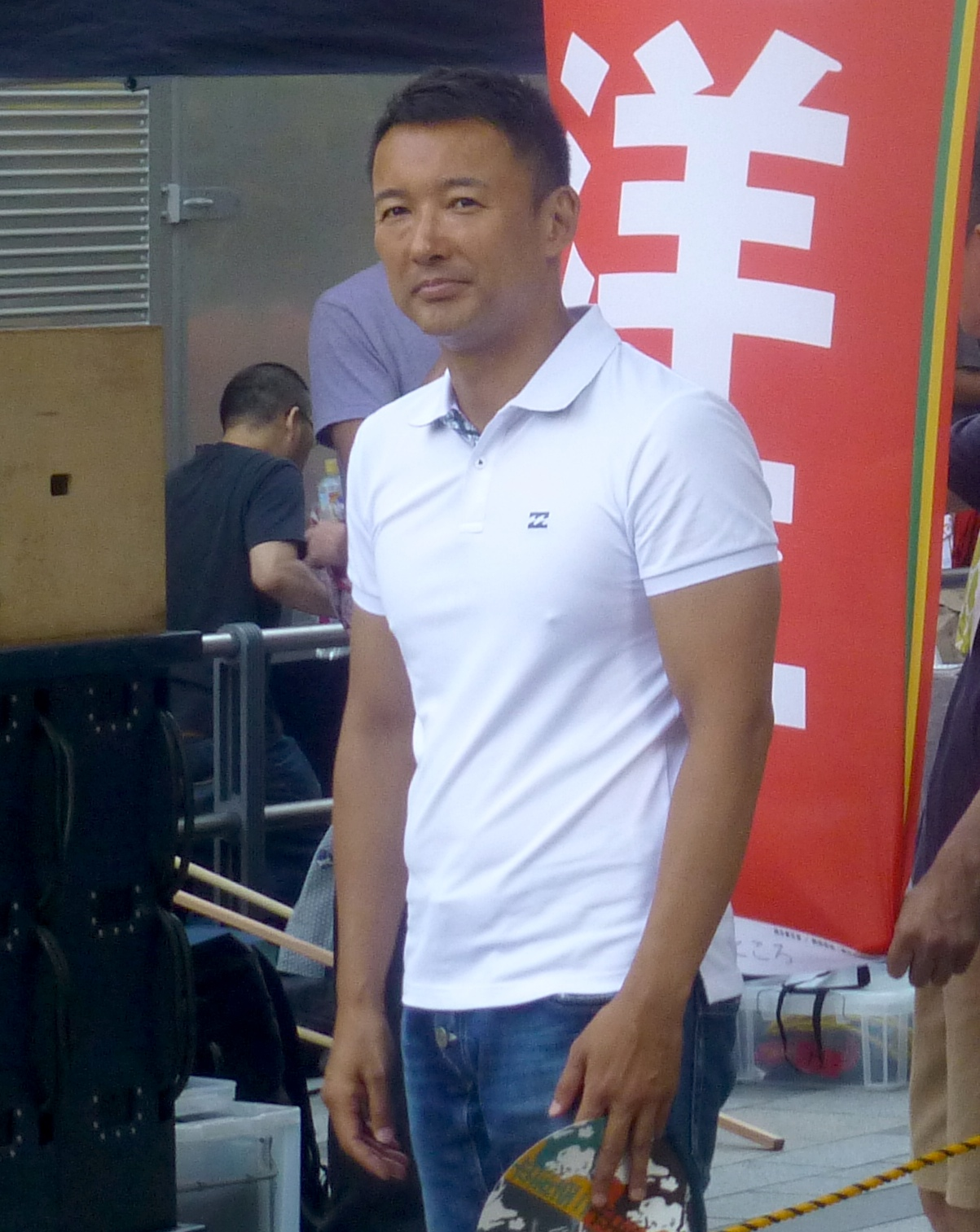
Yamamoto in July 2016

In the 2014 Japanese general election, the People's Life Party (PLP) lost seats and was in danger of losing its qualification as a political party. After the election, Yamamoto joined the party, and the party name was changed to "People's Life Party & Taro Yamamoto and Friends."

In September 2015, in a vote of security-related bills of the House of Councillors plenary session, he voted while wearing mourning garb and a rosary, and gestured to offer incense to Prime Minister Shinzo Abe and the Liberal Democratic Party.

Tarō Yamamoto giving a speech in Shimbashi, 2018

=== Liberal Party (2016–2019) ===
In October 2016, the People's Life Party & Taro Yamamoto and Friends was renamed to Liberal Party in preparation of the upcoming general election in 2017. The party went into the election as an informal bloc, and most of its members chose to either run under the Kibō no Tō banner or as independents.

In April 2019, the Liberal Party officially dissolved and merged into the Democratic Party for the People. However, Yamamoto announced his intentions before the merger to form a new group, named Reiwa Shinsengumi.

=== Reiwa Shinsengumi (2019–present) ===
In the first election the party contested, Yamamoto lost his seat in the House of Councillors after switching his electoral district from Tokyo to the party's National PR list, but he led his party to win 4.55% of the vote and two seats in the House of Councillors. Both of the candidates who won — Yasuhiko Funago and Eiko Kimura — were elected from the nationwide proportional bloc, and both were the first people with severe disabilities to be elected to the parliament.

In June 2020, Yamamoto announced his candidacy for the 2020 Tokyo gubernatorial election. His campaign was mainly based around a pledge to cancel the 2020 Summer Olympics, and to also establish a 100,000 yen direct cash relief handout program as a part of Tokyo's response to the COVID-19 pandemic. Yamamoto came in third place in the election, winning 657,277 votes, or 10.72% of the vote.

At the 2021 general election, Yamamoto won a seat in the House of Representatives running on the Tokyo PR list. His party won three seats, up from the one it held. It won seats in Tokyo, which was won by Yamamoto himself, the South Kanto proportional block, won by Ryo Tagaya, and the Kinki proportional block, which is held by Akiko Ōishi. The party also extensively co-operated with opposition parties, forming a four group pact with the Constitutional Democratic Party, Japanese Communist Party, and Social Democratic Party. Yamamoto also withdrew from running for Tokyo's 8th district and opted to run for Tokyo's proportional block as a result, leaving the 8th to the CDP's Harumi Yoshida. Reiwa Shinsengumi also withdrew seven candidates as part of the pact, meaning over 40% of its planned slate would end up not running.

Yamamoto resigned his seat in the House of Representatives in April 2022, and announced his intention to increase his party's representation in the House of Councillors. He was replaced in the lower house by Mari Kushibuchi. Yamamoto won his seat, along with Reiwa gaining three councilors from 2019, leading to a total of 5 councilors after Reiwa won 4.37% of the vote. Two other councilors were elected from the nationwide proportional block.

In 2023, Liberal Democratic Party lawmakers physically held Yamamoto back as he attempted to fling himself at members desks to block an anti-refugee bill in the House of Councilors. The melee lasted several minutes, with the scene being reported on by numerous news outlets.

During the campaign period for the 2025 Japanese House of Councillors election, a video was posted on 18 July with him standing outside of DiverCity Tokyo Plaza in Odaiba, Minato, Tokyo, cosplaying as Quattro Bajeena from Mobile Suit Zeta Gundam as he introduced one of the party's candidates, voice actress Maya Okamoto as she explained how she is campaigning for office to fight for the abolishment and/or reduction of the invoice system in place since 2023. However four days later, Bandai Namco Filmworks, the owners of the Sunrise studio and the Gundam series stated that they didn't give permission from the party to use their character and that they do not support any political candidate.

On 21 January 2026, Yamamoto resigned from the House of Councillors after he was diagnosed with multiple myeloma, a hematologic cancer. He stated he would continue as party leader with a reduced workload. On 9 July 2026, he resigned as leader of Reiwa following a speeding violation.

== Filmography ==
Year	Title	Role	Notes
1996	That's Cunning! Shijō Saidai no Sakusen?	Kimura Kenji	
1998	Love Letter		
1999	Big show! Hawaii ni utaeba		
2000	Battle Royale	Shogo Kawada	
2001	Hashire! Ichiro		
2001	Rain of Light		
2001	Go	Tawake	
2001	Genji: A Thousand-Year Love		
2002	Through the Night		
2003	Moon Child	Toshi	
2003	Get Up!	Taro	
2003	The Boat to Heaven		
2004	Shinsengumi!	Harada Sanosuke	
2004	Akai tsuki	Makita Shoichi	
2004	A Day on the Planet		
2004	Izo		
2005	Princess Raccoon	Ostrich Monk	
2005	Under the Same Moon		
2009	Kaiji	Jōji Funai	
2010	Kamen Rider × Kamen Rider OOO & W Featuring Skull: Movie War Core (Skull: Message for Double)	Seiichiro Matsui	
2011	My Way	Noda	
