= Faculty of Economics, University of Tokyo =

Faculty of Economics Graduate School of Economics
- 経済学部・経済学研究科
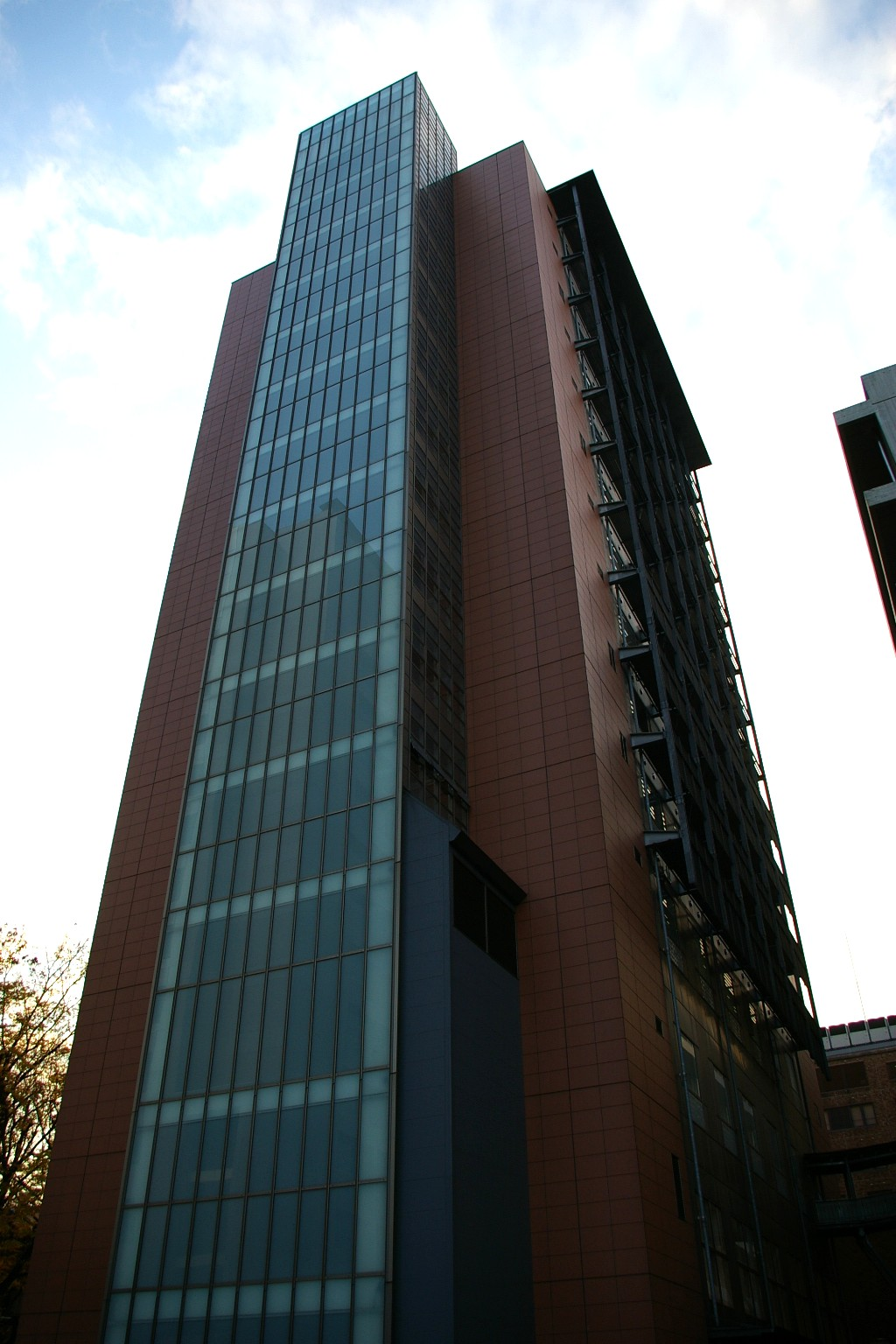
- Graduate School of Economics Building
- Established: 1908 (as part of the Faculty of Law); 1919 (as an independent faculty)
- Affiliations: University of Tokyo
- Dean of Faculty: Taiji Furusawa
- Location: Tokyo, Japan
- Website: https://www.e.u-tokyo.ac.jp/index-e.html

The Faculty of Economics is one of the ten constituent faculties of the University of Tokyo. Its affiliated graduate school is the Graduate School of Economics, and they operate as one organisation in practice. It is located on the main Hongo Campus in Bunkyo, Tokyo.

== History ==
Records show that economics was taught at the university as early as in 1878. The Faculty of Economics was established in 1919, following the separation of the Department of Economics, created in 1908 from the Department of Political Science at the Faculty of Law, and the Department of Commerce, established in 1909.

== Organisation ==
=== Undergraduate ===
Senior division undergraduates who wish to study economics are matriculated into one of the following departments after the shingaku sentaku.

- Economics
- Management
- Finance

=== Postgraduate ===
About a third of the postgraduate student body consists of international students.

- Economics
  - Economics
  - Statistics
  - Area Studies
  - Economic History
- Management
  - Management
  - Quantitative Finance

=== Research centres ===
- University of Tokyo Market Design Center (UTMD)
- Center for International Research on the Japanese Economy (CIRJE)
- Center for Advanced Research in Finance (CARF)
- Management Education and Research Center (MERC)
- Center for Research and Education in Program Evaluation (CREPE)
- Center for Real Estate Innovation (CREI)
