= Active Citizenship =

Active Citizenship Cittadinanza Attiva
- Founded: 2012
- Dissolved: 15 November 2012
- Political position: Left-wing
- Grand Councillors: 9 / 60

Active Citizenship (Italian: Cittadinanza Attiva) was a left-wing political and electoral alliance in San Marino, formed to contest the 2012 general election. It comprises

- United Left (SU, democratic socialist),
- Civic 10.
