= Eiko Kimura =

Japanese politician (born 1965)

- 木村 英子

Member of House of Councillors
- Incumbent
- Assumed office 29 July 2019
- Constituency: National PR

Personal details
- Born: 11 May 1965 (age 61) Yokohama, Kanagawa, Japan
- Party: Reiwa Shinsengumi

Eiko Kimura (木村 英子, Kimura Eiko; born May 11, 1965) is a Japanese politician and current member of the House of Councillors. She and fellow councillor Yasuhiko Funago became the first people with severe disabilities elected to Japan's National Diet in 2019. She currently serves on the Land and Transport and Fundamental National Policies committees as well as the Special Committee on Official Development Assistance and Related Matters. She is a member of the Reiwa Shinsengumi.

== Early life ==
Kimura was born in Yokohama, Japan on May 11, 1965. She became tetraplegic after falling from a baby walker as a child and injuring her cervical vertebrae. She also has cerebral palsy and is unable to move anything below her neck other than her right hand. She grew up in a care home and attended the Hiratsuka School for Children with Disabilities, graduating in 1984. She decided to live independently when she was 19, and moved to Kunitachi, Tokyo. She knew very little about life outside of the care home, where she mostly interacted with other people with disabilities. This separation from non-disabled people inspired her work and, later, her run for office. Her husband was one of the volunteers who supported her after she moved to Tokyo. They married when she was 24 and had a son together.

== Career ==
Kimura began advocating for disability rights in her 30s, and founded Jiritsu Station Tsubasa, an organization that helps people with disabilities live independently. She has also written two books, one about Jiritsu Station Tsubasa and the other about the Sagamihara stabbings.

She ran for the House of Councillors in 2019 as a member of the Reiwa Shinsengumi and was elected to office alongside Yasuhiko Funago, another politician of her party with severe disabilities. The Diet chambers were renovated to accommodate both of their wheelchairs, adding a ramp and removing three seats. Kimura and Funago have called for social welfare services for people with disabilities to be reformed so that they can be accompanied by caregivers outside of their homes. Kimura also advocates better integrating people with disabilities into Japanese society after her experiences at the care home she grew up in and Hiratsuka School.
