= Joji Yamamoto =

Japanese politician and activist

- 山本 譲司
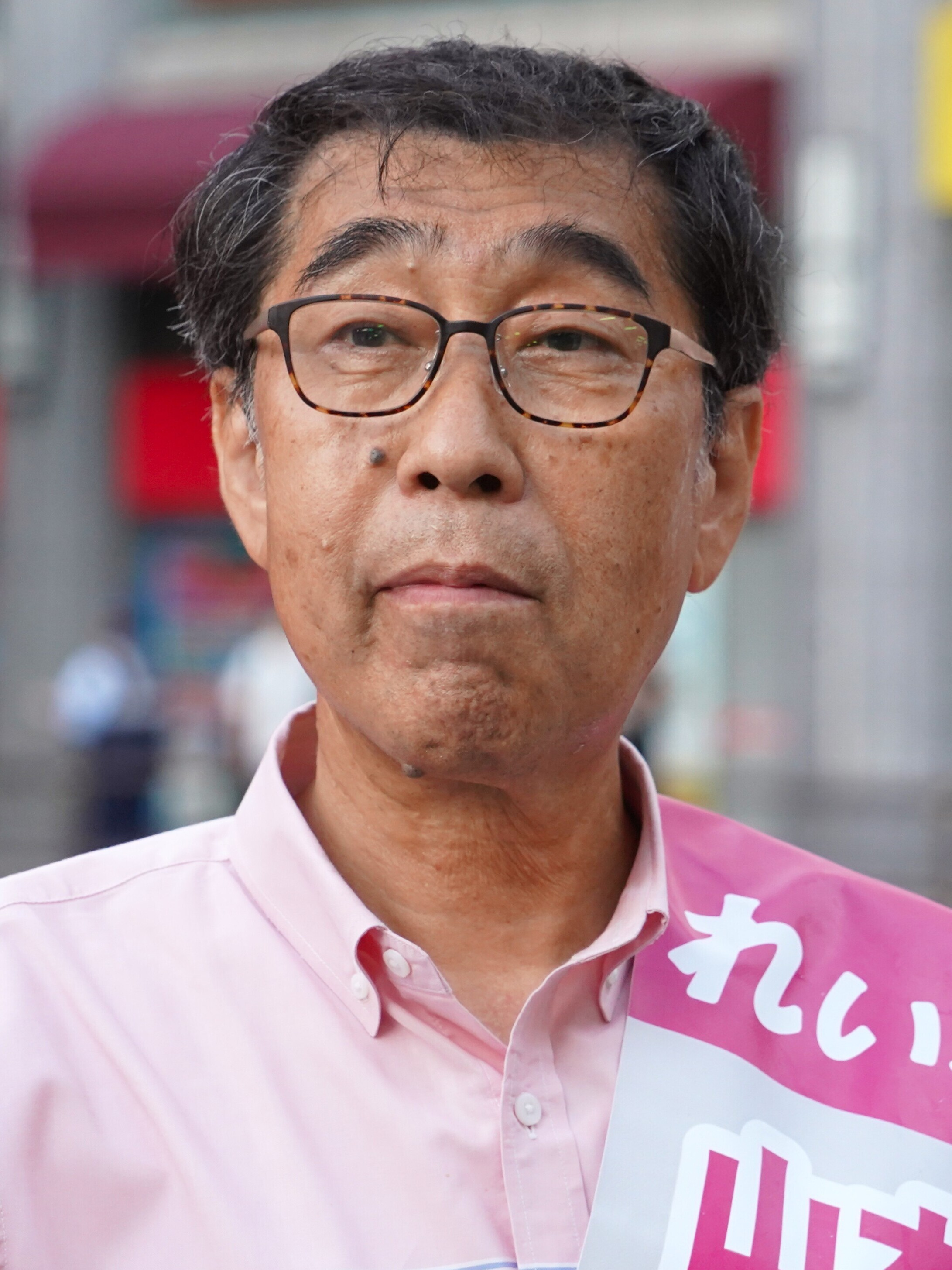
- Yamamoto in 2025

Leader of Party of Life
- Incumbent
- Assumed office 31 July 2026
- Preceded by: Taro Yamamoto

Member of the House of Representatives
- Incumbent
- Assumed office 13 February 2026
- Preceded by: Ryo Tagaya
- Constituency: Southern Kanto PR
- In office 20 October 1996 – 8 September 2000
- Preceded by: Constituency established
- Succeeded by: Etsuko Kawada
- Constituency: Tokyo 21st

Member of the Tokyo Metropolitan Assembly
- In office 2 July 1989 – 20 October 1996
- Constituency: Tachikawa

Personal details
- Born: 20 September 1962 (age 64) Sapporo, Hokkaido, Japan
- Party: Party of Life (since 2025)
- Other political affiliations: Independent (until 1996; 2000–2025); DP (1996–1998); DPJ (1998–2000)
- Education: Waseda University
- Occupation: Journalist • Activist • Politician

Jōji Yamamoto (Japanese: 山本 譲司, Hepburn: Yamamoto Jōji; born 20 September 1962) is a Japanese politician, journalist and care worker who is the leader of the anti-establishment political party Party of Life (formerly named Reiwa Shinsengumi). He is a member of the House of Representatives and a former member of the Tokyo Metropolitan Assembly.

As a social activist, he serves as a director of the rehabilitation and protection corporation "Doho-kai," a steering committee member of the "Life Reconstruction Counseling Center" of the Prisoner Support Organization, and a director of the Tokyo Rehabilitation and Protection Employment Support Providers Organization.

After his election in the 2026 general election, he was appointed secretary general of Reiwa Shinsengumi. On 31 July 2026, Yamamoto was elected leader of Reiwa Shinsengumi following the resignation of Taro Yamamoto (no relation).
