= Party of Life (Japan) =

Political party in Japan

Party of Life いのちの党
- Leader: Joji Yamamoto
- Co-Leader: Daisuke Tenbata
- Secretary-General: Takashi Takai
- Founder: Taro Yamamoto
- Founded: 1 April 2019
- Split from: Liberal Party
- Headquarters: 4F, Oshida Bldg. 2-5-20 Kojimachi, Chiyoda-ku, Tokyo
- Ideology: Progressivism; Left-wing populism
- Political position: Left-wing
- Colors: Pink
- Slogan: 「日本を守る」とは、「あなたを守る」ことから始まる; Nihon wo mamoru to wa anata wo mamoru kotokara hajimaru ("Protecting Japan starts with protecting you")
- Senators: 5 / 248
- Representatives: 1 / 465
- Prefectural assembly members: 0 / 2,644
- Municipal assembly members: 54 / 29,135

Website
- inochinoto.jp (in Japanese)

The Party of Life (Japanese: いのちの党, Hepburn: Inochi no Tō) is a progressive and left-wing populist political party in Japan founded by actor-turned-politician Taro Yamamoto in April 2019. The party was formed by left-wing members of the Liberal Party who opposed its merger with the Democratic Party for the People. The party won more than 4% of the vote after contesting the House of Councillors election in July 2019, gaining two seats only about three and a half months after the formation of the party.

Until August 2026, the party was named Reiwa Shinsengumi (れいわ新選組) after the current era name Reiwa and the Shinsengumi of the Bakumatsu period.

== History ==
=== Founding ===
Former logo

Taro Yamamoto, a member of the House of Councillors for Tokyo, founded the party on 1 April 2019. This was with the intent of standing multiple candidates, including himself, in the upcoming House of Councillors election later in the year. On 10 April, Yamamoto held a press conference and announced the party's platform.

=== 2019 House of Councillors election ===
The party stood multiple candidates in the 2019 House of Councillors election. The party won 2.2 million votes in the national PR block, exceeding the 2% threshold needed to be recognised as a political party, and securing two seats. Nearly one million votes were cast for Yamamoto personally; however, because the party had nominated Yasuhiko Funago and Eiko Kimura, both of whom have disabilities, (Note: Funago with ALS and Kimura with cerebral palsy) ahead of him in the party list, Yamamoto did not win a seat. The National Diet Building was adapted to allow barrier-free access for wheelchair users.

Notable party members include university professor Ayumi Yasutomi and former deputy representative of the North Korean abduction liaison Toru Hasuike.

=== 2020 Tokyo gubernatorial election ===
Yamamoto was one of the 22 candidates participating in the 2020 Tokyo gubernatorial election, coming in third place with 10.72% of the votes. The party promises included a direct cash handout programme due to the COVID-19 pandemic.

=== 2021 Japanese general election ===
Yamamoto joined with the leaders of the Constitutional Democratic Party, Japanese Communist Party, and Social Democratic Party in running a joint opposition coalition based on common policy goals. Yamamoto, who had been formerly running in Tokyo's 8th district, withdrew to run in the Tokyo PR block to avoid vote splitting against the CDP's Harumi Yoshida. The withdrawal came following pushback from local residents, who were hesitant to vote for Yamamoto, a "parachute candidate," over Yoshida, who had been active within the community for many years prior. The party further withdrew 7 candidates as part of the joint platform to avoid vote splitting between the opposition parties, accounting for 40% of Reiwa Shinsengumi's planned slate of candidates.

There were 20 other candidates besides Yamamoto running under the Reiwa Shinsengumi banner, including Takashi Takai, who was expelled from the Constitutional Democratic Party of Japan after ignoring COVID-19 state of emergency laws. Takai was at that moment Reiwa Shinsengumi's only sitting legislator, formerly elected on the CDP list for the Chūgoku proportional representation block. Takai ran for Shiga Prefecture's 3rd District but was not elected. Reiwa ultimately won three seats in the House of Representatives, electing Yamamoto, Akiko Oishi, and Hayato Kinoshita.

=== 2022 House of Councillors election ===
Yamamoto announced his resignation from the House of Representatives seat to which he was elected in 2021 general election, and contested in Tokyo metropolitan constituency for the House of Councillors. Reiwa gained three seats in the election, bringing their total to five: Yamamoto winning a seat in Tokyo, along with two other candidates, Daisuke Tenbata and Hakase Suidobashi, who took up seats in the nationwide proportional representation block.

=== 2024 Japanese general election ===
Reiwa Shinsengumi won nine seats in the 2024 Japanese general election, tripling their seat count in the House of Representatives and winning 6.98% of the proportional representation vote.

=== 2025 House of Councillors election ===
Reiwa Shinsengumi won a total of six seats in the election, up one from 2019.

On 21 January 2026, Yamamoto resigned from the House of Councillors after being diagnosed with multiple myeloma. He stated he would continue as party leader with a reduced workload.

=== 2026 Japanese general election ===
In the 2026 election, Reiwa Shinsengumi ran just 18 candidates. The party was reduced to one seat in the House of Representatives, down from nine, and achieved just under three percent of the vote, down four points from 2024. This is the party's worst result since its formation.

=== 2026 leadership changes ===
On 3 July 2026, the party announced that then-leader Taro Yamamoto had received a speeding ticket in October 2025 during a business trip. Yamamoto was fined ¥90,000 in Ōita Prefecture for driving 149 km/h (93 mph) in an 80 km/h (50 mph) zone, 69 km/h over the limit. His driver's license was suspended for 90 days.

On 9 July 2026, Taro Yamamoto made announced his resignation as party leader of Reiwa Shinsengumi. His stated reason was health issues and the "inexcusable" speeding incident. Yamamoto also announced the resignation of other members of party leadership from their positions, including co-party leader Akiko Oishi and Secretary-General Joji Yamamoto. Oishi also announced her intention to leave the party. A leadership election was scheduled for 31 July 2026 with campaigning to begin on 17 July 2026. It was also determined that the party's name would be changed after the election, with Taro Yamamoto stating that he did not want to stand in the way of the party as “a relic of the past.”

On 31 July 2026, Joji Yamamoto was elected as new party leader of Reiwa Shinsengumi.

== Ideology and policies ==
Reiwa Shinsengumi has been described as progressive, left-wing populist, and sits on the left of the left–right political spectrum. Some scholars classify the party's views as radical left-wing, while others refer to the party as centre-left. The party is sometimes considered as liberal, progressive populist, "liberal-populist", or fiscal populist. Eder-Ramsauer and Matsutani describe Reiwa Shinsengumi as an eclectic left-wing populist party that blends emancipatory radical democratic politics with an openness to communitarian ideas whilst opposing neoliberalism. Ulv Hanssen points out that the ideological stance that drives the party's populism is anti-neoliberal, a repudiation of neoliberal populism. On the other hand, Axel Klein, who takes an ideational approach, writes that the party does not meet the criteria that define (left) populism.

The party's platform emphasizes inclusivity and progressive social values, along with left-wing economic policies such as raising the minimum wage and raising taxes on the wealthy. The party's top policy priorities include reducing or abolishing the consumption tax, strengthening progressive corporate taxation, raising the government-subsidized minimum wage to ¥1,500 per hour, forgiving student loan repayments, and expanding social welfare in general. The party has made the Green New Deal its policy platform and believes a big government role is needed to solve problems. Kamata writes that the party's economic policies are more radical than those of other Japanese political parties. They use a populist and anti-establishment message to attract youngers and urban voters who tend to be left-wing and socially progressive leanings.

The party takes a similar stance to the Japanese Communist Party including in its advocacy of pacifism in East Asia and its stance against the use of nuclear power. Sam Bidwell describes the party as a fusion of the anti-nuclear movement and pacifist traditions of the Japanese leftist with the social progressivism and demagogic style of the Western leftist. The party's manifesto states that it is necessary to focus on "exclusively defence-oriented policy" and "peaceful diplomacy" in order to contribute to peace in East Asia, and reiterates its opposition to nuclear weapons and supports peace in its security policy. The party has defended Palestine and taken part in protests against Israel.

The party is variously described as being anti-austerity, anti-establishment, and anti-nuclear power as well as supporting animal welfare, minority rights, and economic interventionism, and the main supporters of this party are also left-liberals.

According to their "Emergency Policies" document, the party supports reducing carbon emissions as fast as possible, reducing emissions by 70% by 2030 and reaching net-zero emissions by 2050, eradicating tuition fees and university debt, and providing free childcare, school lunches, afterschool activities, and medical expenses for children under 18.

The party is also notable for its activism outside of the Diet, including in street protests. Lawmakers such as Akiko Oishi and Mari Kushibuchi have been active in pro-Palestine street demonstrations.

== Controversy ==
The party attracted controversy ahead of the 2024 Japanese general election when Chinese Consul General Xue Jian in Osaka endorsed them. The incident lead to widespread backlash and led to several calls for Xue to be expelled on the grounds of illegal foreign interference in an election.

== Leader ==
No.	Name (Birth–death)	Constituency / title	Term of office		Election results	Image
No.	Name (Birth–death)	Constituency / title	Took office	Left office	Election results	Image
Split from: a part of Liberal Party (2016)
1	Taro Yamamoto (b. 1974)	Councillor for Tokyo (21 July 2013 – 21 July 2019; 25 July 2022 – 21 January 2026); Rep for Tokyo PR block (31 October 2021 – 15 April 2022)	1 April 2019	10 July 2026	2019 Unopposed 2022 Taro Yamamoto – 8.83; Mari Kushibuchi and Akiko Oishi – 4.36; Tsunehira Furuya – 3.81 2025 Taro Yamamoto – 17.04; Ai Yahata – 5.14; Naoto Sakaguchi – 3.64; Ikki Shinohara - 2.45; Mitsuaki Aoyagi - 1.78	
2	Joji Yamamoto (b. 1962)	Rep for Southern Kanto PR (13 February 2026 – present); Rep for Tokyo 21st (20 October 1996 – 8 September 2000); Member of the Tokyo Metropolitan Assembly for Tachikawa (2 July 1989 – 20 October 1996)	31 July 2026	Incumbent	2026 Joji Yamamoto – 15.59; Naoto Sakaguchi – 3.15; Reiko Ishii - 2.30	

== Election results ==
=== House of Representatives ===
Election	Leader	Candidates	Seats			Position	Constituency votes		PR Block votes		Government
Election	Leader	Candidates	No.	±	Share	Position	Number	%	Number	%	Government
2021	Taro Yamamoto	21	3 / 465	new	0.6%	7th	248,280	0.43%	2,215,648	3.86%	Opposition
2024	Taro Yamamoto	35	9 / 465	▲6	1.9%	▲6th	425,445	0.78%	3,805,060	6.98%	Opposition
2026	Taro Yamamoto	18	1 / 465	▼8	0.2%	▼8th	255,496	0.45%	1,672,499	2.92%	Opposition

=== House of Councillors ===
Election	Leader	Candidates	Seats		Nationwide		Prefecture		Status
Election	Leader	Candidates	Total	Won	Votes	%	Votes	%	Status
2019	Taro Yamamoto	10	2 / 245	2 / 124	2,280,252	4.6	214,438	0.4	Opposition
2022	Taro Yamamoto	14	5 / 248	3 / 125	2,319,157	4.4	989,716	1.9	Opposition
2025	Taro Yamamoto	24	6 / 248	3 / 125	3,879,914	6.6	1,881,606	3.2	Opposition

=== Tokyo gubernatorial ===
Election	Candidate	Votes	%	Finishing place	Result
2020	Taro Yamamoto	657,277	10.72	3rd	Lost

=== Tokyo prefectural ===
Election	Leader	Votes	%	Seats
2021	Taro Yamamoto	37,299	0.80	0 / 127
2025	Taro Yamamoto	46,743	0.88	0 / 127
